= 2008 Ford 400 =

Race details
- Race 36 of 36 in the 2008 NASCAR Sprint Cup Series
- Homestead-Miami Speedway
- Date: November 16, 2008
- Location: Homestead–Miami Speedway, Homestead, Florida
- Course: Permanent racing facility
- Course length: 1.5 miles (2.4 km)
- Distance: 267 laps, 400.5 mi (644.542 km)
- Weather: Temperatures reaching up to 77.9 °F (25.5 °C); wind speeds up to 17.1 miles per hour (27.5 km/h)
- Average speed: 129.472 miles per hour (208.365 km/h)

Pole position
Driver	David Reutimann	Michael Waltrip Racing
- Time: 31.462

Most laps led
Driver	Carl Edwards	Roush Fenway Racing
- Laps: 157

Winner
No. 99	Carl Edwards	Roush Fenway Racing

Television in the United States
- Network: ABC
- Announcers: Dale Jarrett, Andy Petree, Jerry Punch

The 2008 Ford 400, a 400.5 miles (644.5 km) race, was the concluding event of the 2008 NASCAR Sprint Cup season along with the 2008 Chase for the Sprint Cup, and decides the Sprint Cup Champion for the 2008 season, this race was historic for being the race where Jimmie Johnson became the second driver (after Cale Yarborough) to win the Sprint Cup title three years in a row. The 267-lap race on the 1.5 miles (2.4 km) track was held on November 16 at Homestead–Miami Speedway in Homestead, Florida. ABC covered the race beginning at 3 PM EST and MRN along with Sirius Satellite Radio had radio coverage starting at that same time.

The race also served as the final event of NASCAR Championship Weekend, which also includes the Craftsman Truck Series Ford 200 and Nationwide Series Ford 300 races on Friday and Saturday of that weekend, also serving as the season finales for those series as well.

== Background ==
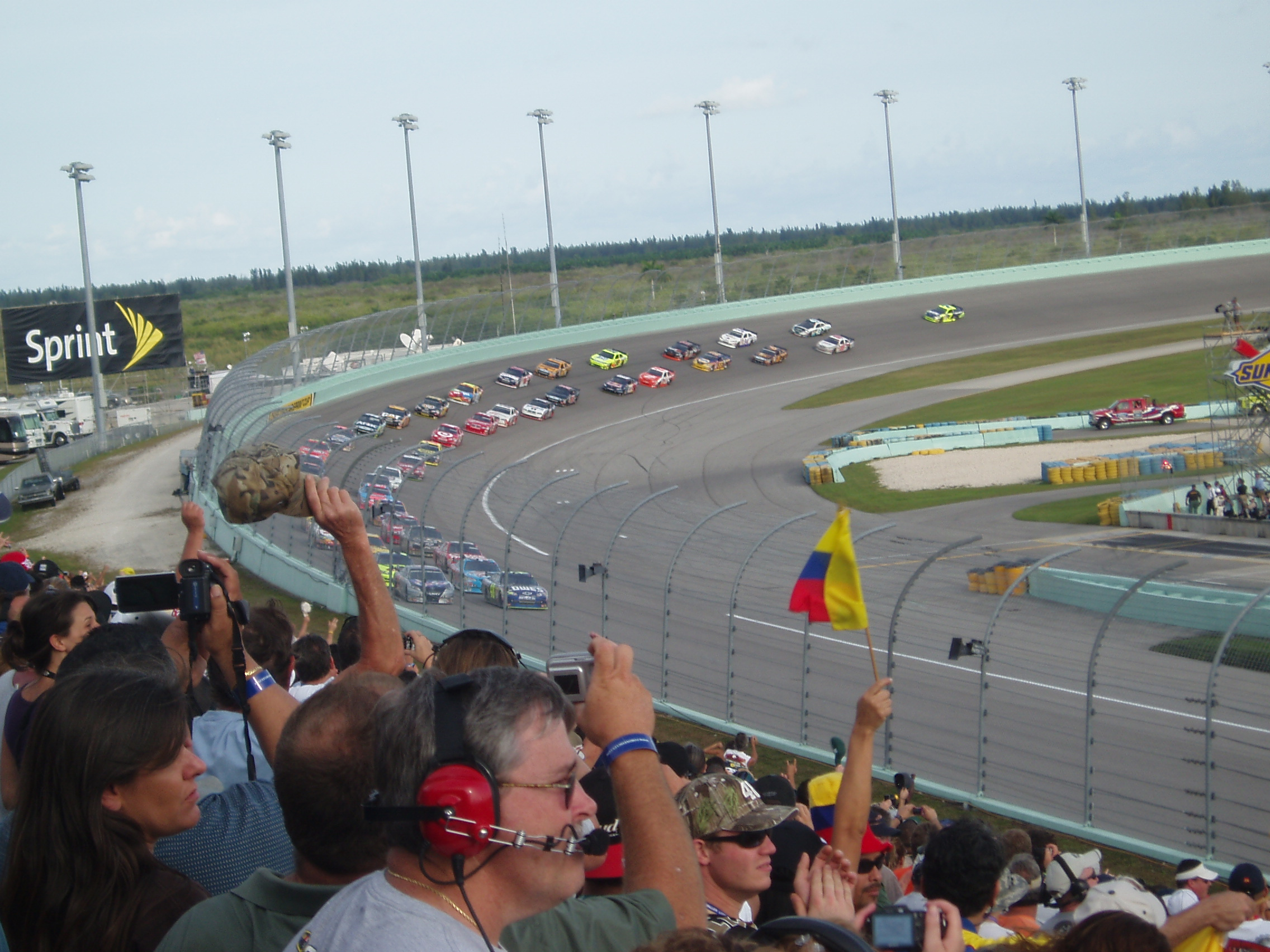
Homestead–Miami Speedway, the track where the race was held.

Homestead–Miami Speedway is a motor racing track located in Homestead, Florida. The track, which has several configurations, has promoted several series of racing, including NASCAR, the IndyCar Series, the Grand-Am Rolex Sports Car Series and the Championship Cup Series.

From 2002 until 2019, Homestead–Miami Speedway hosted the final race of the season in all three of NASCAR's series: the Sprint Cup Series, Nationwide Series and Craftsman Truck Series. Ford Motor Company sponsored all three of the season-ending races; the races had the names Ford 400, Ford 300 and Ford 200, respectively, and the weekend was marketed as NASCAR Championship Weekend. The Nationwide Series had held its season-ending races at Homestead from 1995 until 2019.

== Pre-Race News ==
- All Jimmie Johnson had to do to clinch the 2008 Chase for the Sprint Cup Championship is one of the following as he will start the race per the Top 35 Owners Points rule:
  1. Finish 36th without leading a lap;
  2. Finish 37th and lead at least one lap;
  3. Finish 39th and lead the most laps in the race;
- In an interview during the pre-race for the Checker O'Reilly Auto Parts 500 this past week, NASCAR chairman Brian France stated that he isn't certain any of the USA's "Big Three" automakers (General Motors, Chrysler and Ford Motor Company) would continue their involvement in NASCAR while in these current tough economic times, but should their funding of race teams suffer due to the crisis in the credit markets, stock car racing would remain a viable, healthy sport.
- Brian Vickers (#84) and Scott Speed (#83) will swap cars for this race in an attempt to put the #84 back in the top 35 in owner points. Earlier, Mark Martin was to have driven the #84 Team Red Bull Toyota, but that move was nixed by General Motors executives. Martin, who will move to the #5 Hendrick Motorsports Chevrolet next season, ran his last race for Dale Earnhardt, Inc. last week in the #8 Chevy, and Aric Almirola will drive that car full-time in 2009. In the end, the #84 finished the season 35th in points.
- DEI will merge with Chip Ganassi Racing for the 2009 season and will be renamed Earnhardt Ganassi Racing with Felix Sabates, run Chevrolets and have Almirola (#8), Martin Truex Jr. (#1), Juan Pablo Montoya (#42) and one other driver for the #41 car to be announced. As a result, DEI's #15 (driven by Paul Menard, who moves to Yates Racing in 2009) and #01 (for Regan Smith) along with Ganassi's #40 team will close.

== Qualifying ==
Surprises were abound in the qualifying session, as David Reutimann won his first pole position in his career. Regan Smith wrapped up the Rookie of the Year award as Sam Hornish Jr. failed to make the field. Jimmie Johnson started 30th and Carl Edwards would start at fourth.

Results 1-Carl Edwards

2-Kevin Harvick

3-Jamie Mcmurray

4-Jeff Gordon

5-Clint Bowyer

6-Kasey Kahne

8-Travis Kvapil

9-Tony Stewert

10-Martin Truex Jr

Aftermath

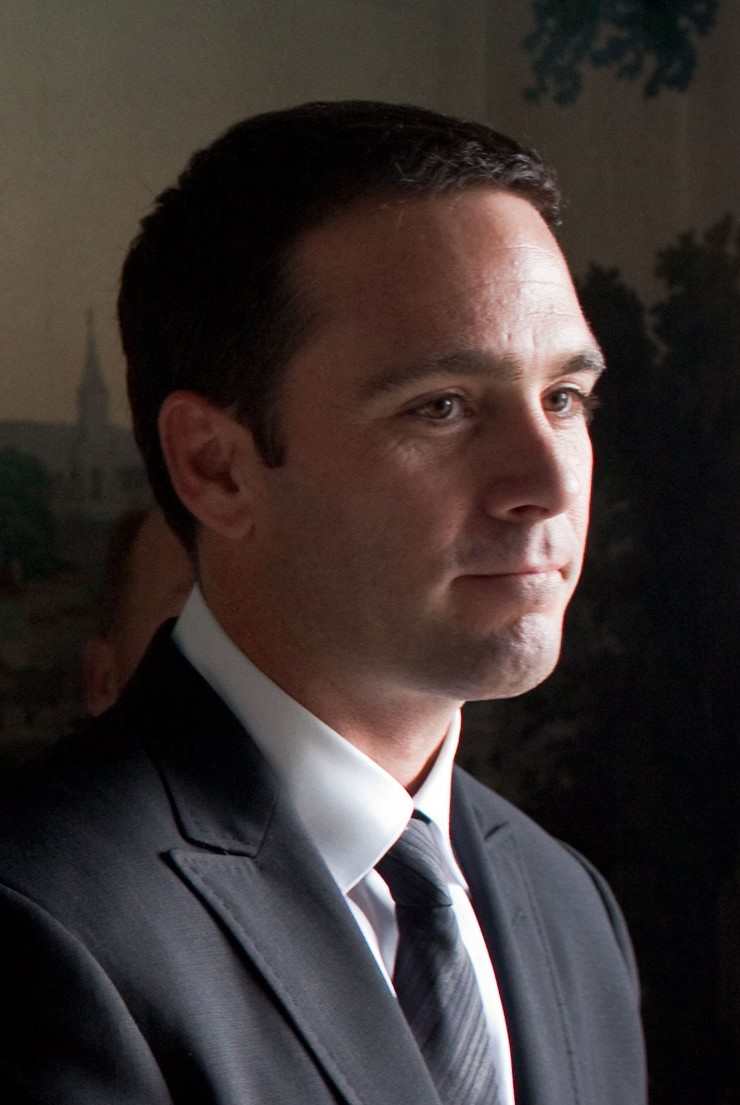
Jimmie Johnson won the championship, after finishing 15th in the race

With a 15th-place finish, Jimmie Johnson made history as he became just the second Sprint Cup driver to win three titles in a row. The response from NASCAR fans was phenomenal, as he won many accolades and was celebrated worldwide after his championship victory. Jimmie ended up beating 2nd place Carl Edwards by a total of 69 points.

Failed to Qualify: Sam Hornish Jr. (#77), Ken Schrader (#96), Max Papis (#13)
