= NASCAR Championship Weekend =

Tournament information
- Sport: Auto racing
- Location: Homestead-Miami Speedway, Homestead, Florida (2002-2019; 2026-present); Phoenix Raceway, Avondale, Arizona (2020-2025)
- Established: 2002 (as Ford Championship Weekend)
- Format: Championship
- Host: NASCAR
- Teams: NASCAR Cup Series; NASCAR O'Reilly Auto Parts Series; NASCAR Craftsman Truck Series

Since 2002, NASCAR's top three racing series have closed their season with a weekend designed to crown each series' champion, officially known as NASCAR Championship Weekend.

Since the championship race weekend was first run in 2002, it has been conducted at two tracks. The first, longest serving, and current track to host the weekend is Homestead-Miami Speedway, located in Homestead, Florida. From 2020 until 2025, the weekend was held at Phoenix Raceway in Avondale, Arizona.

== History ==
The Ford Championship Weekend logo

Prior to 2002, all three of NASCAR's major series ended their seasons at different tracks. From 1995 until 2001, only the then-Busch Series had run its final race at Homestead; NASCAR had begun racing there when the track opened as the Homestead Motorsports Complex that same year.

The Truck Series, which added Homestead to its full schedule in 1996 and ran an early season race at the track, had traditionally closed its season in the western United States. Although several tracks had received this distinction, Phoenix had been the most frequent host to the season finale.

The then-Winston Cup series had added Homestead to its schedule for 1999, but had (save for a 9/11 related postponement) run its final race at Atlanta Motor Speedway since 1987.

The races are run over three consecutive days, with the Truck Series running on Friday, the second tier series race on Saturday, and the Cup Series on Sunday. When the races were initially run at Homestead, the Truck Series ran for 200 miles, the Busch/Nationwide/Xfinity Series race for 300 miles, and the Cup race for 400 miles. At Phoenix, those distances were set at 150 miles, 200 miles, and 312 miles/500 kilometers.

After each race, an official ceremony is conducted in victory lane where the final points leader in each series is given his championship trophy.

In 2016, NASCAR adopted a championship format that is similar in function to one used by the National Hot Rod Association. After every three races, every driver below a certain threshold would be eliminated from championship contention. Once the third set of eliminations was made, four drivers would remain. The highest placing driver among those four in the final race, regardless of position, would become the champion.

This format was in place until 2025. For 2026, NASCAR abandoned this championship format in favor of a return to its previous championship format. In this format, the drivers that managed to qualify for the championship competed to be the one with the highest point total at the end of the season, and thus win the championship.

=== Pre-playoff history ===
Prior to 2004, when the first Chase for the Nextel Cup was conducted, all three series' championships were decided over the course of the entire season. The driver that was able to accumulate the most points over the course of the season was declared champion. However, the old system had the chance that one driver would be so dominant over the course of the season that he would clinch the championship before the final race; this was especially the case during the era of Cup Series drivers running the full season in the second national series in addition to the entire Cup schedule, as the championship was clinched six times prior to the finale before the now-O'Reilly Auto Parts Series adopted its own playoff format.

In the pre-playoff era, there were a total of four occasions where a series points leader entering the race did not end it as champion. The first two occurrences happened during the Ford 200 Truck Series race. In 2003, Brendan Gaughan crashed out of the event late, finished 29th, and fell from first to fourth in the standings while Travis Kvapil won the championship. In 2007, Ron Hornaday Jr. and Mike Skinner were separated by 29 points going into the race, but points leader Skinner had a problem with one of his truck's tires and axles and finished 35th. Hornaday finished seventh and won the title by 54 points. In 2010, 46 points separated first place Denny Hamlin, second place Jimmie Johnson, and third place Kevin Harvick in the Sprint Cup standings. At various times in the Ford 400 each driver held the points lead, but in the end Johnson clinched his fifth consecutive Sprint Cup championship by finishing second in the race. Hamlin fell to second place, 39 points behind Johnson, with his 14th-place finish. Harvick finished 3rd in both the race and the points, 41 points behind Johnson. In 2011, Tony Stewart entered the race three points behind Carl Edwards for the Sprint Cup lead. Stewart won the Ford 400 with Edwards finishing second and the points race ended in a tie. However, due to Stewart holding more victories than Edwards over the course of the season (Stewart's win gave him five while Edwards only won once), Stewart won the tiebreaker and became series champion for a third time.

== Television and radio coverage ==
=== Current ===
The Truck Series race is carried by Fox Sports, which has the exclusive rights to air Truck Series events. The race is aired on Fox Sports 1, which has aired the event since 2013; under its previous branding, Speed Channel, it aired the race from 2003 until 2012.

The O'Reilly Auto Parts Series race is carried by CW Sports, which has been the exclusive home to the second tier series since 2025.

NBC Sports, under the terms of the current broadcasting contract, has had the broadcast rights to the Cup Series race since 2015.

=== Previous ===
When Championship Weekend began, the Truck Series race was carried by ESPN2 as ESPN retained the rights to the series after losing its NASCAR broadcast rights following the 2000 season. Speed Channel took over all rights beginning in 2003; the network became Fox Sports 1 in August 2013.

When Homestead first received a Cup Series race in 1999, NBC struck a deal to televise both it and the pre-existing race in the then-Busch Series, which had launched in 1995 and was previously covered by CBS and ESPN. When the 2001 television contract took effect, NBC kept the rights to the Cup Series event and shared the second-tier race with its then-cable partner, TNT.

As part of the 2007 television contract, ESPN took over exclusive coverage of what was still the Busch Series and thus aired every race in that series over the course of the season on either ESPN, ESPN2, or ABC. ESPN also had rights to the Cup Series race during this time, airing many of the same races that NBC and TNT had been airing during the previous contract (with the exception of the races TNT decided to keep for itself during the summer months).

== Race results ==
As noted above, final races were run at Homestead–Miami Speedway from 2002 until 2019 and at Phoenix Raceway from 2020.

=== Truck Series ===
Original season format

| Year | Race winner | Team | Series champion | Team | Notes |
|---|---|---|---|---|---|
| 2002 | Ron Hornaday Jr. | Xpress Motorsports | Mike Bliss | Xpress Motorsports | |
| 2003 | Bobby Hamilton | Bobby Hamilton Racing | Travis Kvapil | Xpress Motorsports | Kvapil won the championship after NASCAR reviewed and upheld a black flag given to Ted Musgrave for attempting to pass Kvapil under caution. Had the penalty been reversed, Musgrave would have been granted a sixth-place finish and won the championship over seventh-place Kvapil. He is also the second Truck Series former Rookie of the Year to win the Championship. |
| 2004 | Kasey Kahne | Ultra Motorsports | Bobby Hamilton | Bobby Hamilton Racing | Hamilton became the first owner/driver to win a Truck Series Championship. |
| 2005 | Todd Bodine | Germain Racing | Ted Musgrave | Ultra Motorsports | Musgrave's championship was Dodge's last in the Truck Series; the company pulled out of most NASCAR competition following the 2012 season, by which time the Ram Trucks brand had replaced Dodge's on its line of trucks. |
| 2006 | Mark Martin | Roush Racing | Todd Bodine | Germain Racing | Bodine won Toyota's first NASCAR championship. |
| 2007 | Johnny Benson Jr. | Bill Davis Racing | Ron Hornaday Jr. | Kevin Harvick, Inc. | This was Hornaday's third Truck title and his first since 1998. |
| 2008 | Todd Bodine | Germain Racing | Johnny Benson Jr. | Bill Davis Racing | Last championship conducted under Craftsman's original title sponsorship. |
| 2009 | Kevin Harvick | Kevin Harvick, Inc. | Ron Hornaday Jr. | Kevin Harvick, Inc. | Hornaday had clinched the series points title following the Lucas Oil 150 at Phoenix. Hornaday's fourth and final championship. First Camping World Truck Series champion. |
| 2010 | Kyle Busch | Kyle Busch Motorsports | Todd Bodine | Germain Racing | Bodine had clinched the series points title following the Lucas Oil 150 at Phoenix; this was his second and final championship. Busch won the series owner's championship for his team with his victory. |
| 2011 | Johnny Sauter | ThorSport Racing | Austin Dillon | Richard Childress Racing | Dillon became the youngest NASCAR top series champion ever. First season under current NASCAR points system. He is also the third Truck Series former Rookie of the Year to win the championship. |
| 2012 | Cale Gale | Eddie Sharp Racing | James Buescher | Turner Motorsports | |
| 2013 | Kyle Busch | Kyle Busch Motorsports | Matt Crafton | ThorSport Racing | Crafton won the Championship by simply starting the race. |
| 2014 | Bubba Wallace | Kyle Busch Motorsports | Matt Crafton | ThorSport Racing | Crafton became the first driver in NCWTS history to win consecutive championships. |
| 2015 | Matt Crafton | ThorSport Racing | Erik Jones | Kyle Busch Motorsports | Jones became the youngest champion in NCWTS history. Last season under normal points format, as the NCWTS adopted a Chase format in 2016. He is also the first Rookie champion in the history of the series therefore also winning the Rookie of the Year that season as well. |

==== Playoff era ====
Highest finishing driver among four eligible for championship wins series championship.

| Year | Race winner | Team | Series champion | Team | Championship Runners-Up | Notes |
|---|---|---|---|---|---|---|
| 2016 | William Byron | Kyle Busch Motorsports | Johnny Sauter | GMS Racing | Matt Crafton, ThorSport Racing; Christopher Bell, Kyle Busch Motorsports; Timothy Peters, Red Horse Racing | Sauter becomes the fourth Truck Series former Rookie of the Year to win the championship. |
| 2017 | Chase Briscoe | Brad Keselowski Racing | Christopher Bell | Kyle Busch Motorsports | Johnny Sauter, GMS Racing; Austin Cindric, Brad Keselowski Racing; Matt Crafton, ThorSport Racing | |
| 2018 | Brett Moffitt | Hattori Racing Enterprises | Brett Moffitt | Hattori Racing Enterprises | Johnny Sauter, GMS Racing; Justin Haley, GMS Racing; Noah Gragson, Kyle Busch Motorsports | |
| 2019 | Austin Hill | Hattori Racing Enterprises | Matt Crafton | ThorSport Racing | Stewart Friesen, Halmar Friesen Racing; Ross Chastain, Niece Motorsports; Brett Moffitt, GMS Racing | Crafton was the first Truck Series Champion to win the Championship without winning a race in the season he won the Championship in. Championship is Crafton's third as a driver. ThorSport Racing ties Hendrick Motorsports for most championships as a Truck Series team with three. Camping World temporarily rebranded series under its Gander Brand. |
| 2020 | Sheldon Creed | GMS Racing | Sheldon Creed | GMS Racing | Brett Moffitt, GMS Racing; Zane Smith, GMS Racing; Grant Enfinger, ThorSport Racing | |
| 2021 | Chandler Smith | Kyle Busch Motorsports | Ben Rhodes | ThorSport Racing | Matt Crafton, ThorSport Racing; John Hunter Nemechek, Kyle Busch Motorsports; Zane Smith, GMS Racing | ThorSport Racing wins its fourth Truck Series championship, setting a new team record. |
| 2022 | Zane Smith | Front Row Motorsports | Zane Smith | Front Row Motorsports | Ty Majeski, ThorSport Racing; Ben Rhodes, ThorSport Racing; Chandler Smith, Kyle Busch Motorsports | Front Row Motorsports' first championship in NASCAR. Last Camping World Truck Series champion. |
| 2023 | Christian Eckes | McAnally–Hilgemann Racing | Ben Rhodes | ThorSport Racing | Corey Heim, Tricon Garage; Carson Hocevar, Niece Motorsports; Grant Enfinger, GMS Racing | Eckes' fourth win of the season. Rhodes' second championship, and fifth overall for ThorSport Racing. First champion crowned under return of Craftsman sponsorship to the Truck Series. |
| 2024 | Ty Majeski | ThorSport Racing | Ty Majeski | ThorSport Racing | Grant Enfinger, CR7 Motorsports; Christian Eckes, McAnally–Hilgemann Racing; Corey Heim, Tricon Garage | Majeski wins first championship; ThorSport wins sixth Truck Series championship. |
| 2025 | Corey Heim | Tricon Garage | Corey Heim | Tricon Garage | Kaden Honeycutt, Halmar Friesen Racing; Ty Majeski, ThorSport Racing; Tyler Ankrum, McAnally–Hilgemann Racing | Tricon Garage wins first ever Truck Series championship. Three-time champion Matt Crafton retires following the race. |

==== Chase era ====
Leader in points at the end of the Chase is the series champion.

| Year | Race winner | Team | Series champion | Team | Notes |
|---|---|---|---|---|---|
| 2026 | Kaden Honeycutt | Tricon Garage | Kaden Honeycutt | Tricon Garage | First champion under Chase format. Last championship under Craftsman title sponsorship. |

=== Busch/Nationwide/Xfinity/O'Reilly Auto Parts series ===
| Year | Race winner | Team | Series champion | Team | Notes |
|---|---|---|---|---|---|
| 2002 | Scott Wimmer | Bill Davis Racing | Greg Biffle | Roush Racing | Biffle had clinched the series points championship following the Bashas' Supermarkets 200 at Phoenix. |
| 2003 | Kasey Kahne | Akins Motorsports | Brian Vickers | Hendrick Motorsports | Vickers, at the time, was the youngest driver to win the series championship at 20 years old. |
| 2004 | Kevin Harvick | Kevin Harvick, Inc. | Martin Truex Jr. | Chance 2 Motorsports | Truex clinched the 2004 series championship following the BI-LO 200 at Darlington. In 2005, he became the first driver to win consecutive series championships since his car owner Dale Earnhardt Jr. accomplished the feat in 1998 and 1999. |
| 2005 | Ryan Newman | Penske Racing | Martin Truex Jr. | Chance 2 Motorsports | Truex clinched the 2004 series championship following the BI-LO 200 at Darlington. In 2005, he became the first driver to win consecutive series championships since his car owner Dale Earnhardt Jr. accomplished the feat in 1998 and 1999. |
| 2006 | Matt Kenseth | Roush Racing | Kevin Harvick | Kevin Harvick, Inc./Richard Childress Racing | Harvick had clinched the series championship following the Dollar General 300 at Charlotte. He had previously won the series championship in 2001. |
| 2007 | Jeff Burton | Richard Childress Racing | Carl Edwards | Roush Fenway Racing | Edwards had clinched the series championship following the O'Reilly Challenge at Texas. Last Busch Series champion. |
| 2008 | Carl Edwards | Roush Fenway Racing | Clint Bowyer | Richard Childress Racing | First Nationwide Series Champion. |
| 2009 | Kyle Busch | Joe Gibbs Racing | Kyle Busch | Joe Gibbs Racing | Busch's championship was the first for Toyota in Nationwide Series. |
| 2010 | Kyle Busch | Joe Gibbs Racing | Brad Keselowski | Penske Racing | Keselowski had clinched the championship after the O'Reilly Challenge at Texas. Dodge's first and only Nationwide Series championship. Last season that Cup Series drivers were allowed to compete full time in multiple series and earn points. |
| 2011 | Brad Keselowski | Penske Racing | Ricky Stenhouse Jr. | Roush Fenway Racing | First season under current NASCAR points system. |
| 2012 | Regan Smith | JR Motorsports | Ricky Stenhouse Jr. | Roush Fenway Racing | Smith's first win in the Nationwide Series. |
| 2013 | Brad Keselowski | Penske Racing | Austin Dillon | Richard Childress Racing | Dillon made history by becoming the first driver to win the championship without winning a race. |
| 2014 | Matt Kenseth | Joe Gibbs Racing | Chase Elliott | JR Motorsports | Elliott had clinched the championship following the DAV 200 at Phoenix, making him the first driver to do so under the current points format. He broke Brian Vickers' record for youngest series champion and Austin Dillon's record for youngest ever NASCAR champion by winning title at age 18. Last Nationwide Series champion. |
| 2015 | Kyle Larson | HScott Motorsports | Chris Buescher | Roush Fenway Racing | First Xfinity Series champion. Last season under normal points system; the Xfinity Series adopted a Chase system in 2016. |

==== Playoff era ====
Highest finishing driver among eligible drivers for championship wins series championship.

| Year | Race winner | Team | Series champion | Team | Championship Runners-Up | Notes |
|---|---|---|---|---|---|---|
| 2016 | Daniel Suárez | Joe Gibbs Racing | Daniel Suárez | Joe Gibbs Racing | Elliott Sadler, JR Motorsports; Justin Allgaier, JR Motorsports; Erik Jones, Joe Gibbs Racing | Suárez becomes the first driver of Mexican descent to win a NASCAR top three series championship. |
| 2017 | Cole Custer | Stewart Haas Racing | William Byron | Hendrick Motorsports | Elliott Sadler, JR Motorsports; Justin Allgaier, JR Motorsports; Daniel Hemric, Richard Childress Racing | |
| 2018 | Tyler Reddick | JR Motorsports | Tyler Reddick | JR Motorsports | Cole Custer, Stewart Haas Racing; Christopher Bell, Joe Gibbs Racing; Daniel Hemric, Richard Childress Racing | Reddick becomes first driver in Xfinity Series history to win championships in back to back years with two different teams. |
| 2019 | Tyler Reddick | Richard Childress Racing | Tyler Reddick | Richard Childress Racing | Justin Allgaier, JR Motorsports; Christopher Bell, Joe Gibbs Racing; Cole Custer, Stewart Haas Racing | Reddick becomes first driver in Xfinity Series history to win championships in back to back years with two different teams. |
| 2020 | Austin Cindric | Team Penske | Austin Cindric | Team Penske | Justin Allgaier, JR Motorsports; Justin Haley, Kaulig Racing; Chase Briscoe, Stewart–Haas Racing | |
| 2021 | Daniel Hemric | Joe Gibbs Racing | Daniel Hemric | Joe Gibbs Racing | Austin Cindric, Team Penske; Noah Gragson, JR Motorsports; A. J. Allmendinger, Kaulig Racing | Hemric's championship race win was also his first career race victory in NASCAR's top three series. |
| 2022 | Ty Gibbs | Joe Gibbs Racing | Ty Gibbs | Joe Gibbs Racing | Noah Gragson, JR Motorsports; Josh Berry, JR Motorsports; Justin Allgaier, JR Motorsports | The morning following Gibbs' championship victory, his father Coy died. |
| 2023 | Cole Custer | Stewart–Haas Racing | Cole Custer | Stewart–Haas Racing | Sam Mayer, JR Motorsports; Justin Allgaier, JR Motorsports; John Hunter Nemechek, Joe Gibbs Racing | Stewart–Haas Racing's first Xfinity Series championship. |
| 2024 | Riley Herbst | Stewart–Haas Racing | Justin Allgaier | JR Motorsports | Austin Hill, Richard Childress Racing; A.J. Allmendinger, Kaulig Racing; Cole Custer, Stewart–Haas Racing | Allgaier's first championship comes on his eighth attempt in playoff era. Stewart–Haas Racing does not win the championship in its final season, they did however earn their final win in NASCAR as Herbst won the race, the team announced its dissolution earlier in the season. |
| 2025 | Jesse Love | Richard Childress Racing | Jesse Love | Richard Childress Racing | Connor Zilisch, JR Motorsports; Carson Kvapil, JR Motorsports; Justin Allgaier, JR Motorsports | Final Xfinity Series champion. Zilisch does not win championship despite recording ten victories during season. |

==== Chase era ====
Leader in points at the end of the Chase is champion.

| Year | Race winner | Team | Series champion | Team | Notes |
|---|---|---|---|---|---|
| 2026 | Brandon Jones | Joe Gibbs Racing | Justin Allgaier | JR Motorsports | First O’Reilly Auto Parts Series champion; first second tier series Chase champion. |

=== Cup Series ===
Championships from 2002 and 2003 were conducted under original Cup Series format, where the leader in points at the end of the entire season would be declared the champion. From 2004 until the adoption of the NASCAR Playoffs, the leader at the end of the Chase for the Cup would be declared champion.

| Year | Race winner | Team | Series champion | Team | Notes | Report |
|---|---|---|---|---|---|---|
| 2002 | Kurt Busch | Roush Racing | Tony Stewart | Joe Gibbs Racing | Stewart's first championship and the final Winston Cup title for Pontiac as they pulled out of NASCAR following the 2003 season. | Report |
| 2003 | Bobby Labonte | Joe Gibbs Racing | Matt Kenseth | Roush Racing | Kenseth clinched the Winston Cup championship at the Pop Secret Microwave Popcorn 400 at Rockingham. Last season under previous points format, last Winston Cup champion. Labonte's last win as a full-time Cup Series driver. | Report |
| 2004 | Greg Biffle | Roush Racing | Kurt Busch | Roush Racing | Busch won the first Chase for the Nextel Cup. Biffle was the second of two drivers outside the Chase to win a Chase race in 2004. | Report |
| 2005 | Greg Biffle | Roush Racing | Tony Stewart | Joe Gibbs Racing | Stewart is the only driver in NASCAR history to win a Cup Series championship under the original points format and the Chase format. | Report |
| 2006 | Greg Biffle | Roush Racing | Jimmie Johnson | Hendrick Motorsports | Biffle's second win in this race as a non-Chase driver. | Report |
| 2007 | Matt Kenseth | Roush Fenway Racing | Jimmie Johnson | Hendrick Motorsports | Johnson was the last Nextel Cup champion in 2007 and the first Sprint Cup champion in 2008. In 2009, he surpassed Cale Yarborough's record for most consecutive championships and tied his teammate, Jeff Gordon, for third-most championships with four. In 2010, his championship made him the third driver to win at least five championships, joining Richard Petty and Dale Earnhardt who each recorded seven. | Report |
| 2008 | Carl Edwards | Roush Fenway Racing | Jimmie Johnson | Hendrick Motorsports | Johnson was the last Nextel Cup champion in 2007 and the first Sprint Cup champion in 2008. In 2009, he surpassed Cale Yarborough's record for most consecutive championships and tied his teammate, Jeff Gordon, for third-most championships with four. In 2010, his championship made him the third driver to win at least five championships, joining Richard Petty and Dale Earnhardt who each recorded seven. | Report |
| 2009 | Denny Hamlin | Joe Gibbs Racing | Jimmie Johnson | Hendrick Motorsports | Johnson was the last Nextel Cup champion in 2007 and the first Sprint Cup champion in 2008. In 2009, he surpassed Cale Yarborough's record for most consecutive championships and tied his teammate, Jeff Gordon, for third-most championships with four. In 2010, his championship made him the third driver to win at least five championships, joining Richard Petty and Dale Earnhardt who each recorded seven. | Report |
| 2010 | Carl Edwards | Roush Fenway Racing | Jimmie Johnson | Hendrick Motorsports | Johnson was the last Nextel Cup champion in 2007 and the first Sprint Cup champion in 2008. In 2009, he surpassed Cale Yarborough's record for most consecutive championships and tied his teammate, Jeff Gordon, for third-most championships with four. In 2010, his championship made him the third driver to win at least five championships, joining Richard Petty and Dale Earnhardt who each recorded seven. | Report |
| 2011 | Tony Stewart | Stewart–Haas Racing | Tony Stewart | Stewart–Haas Racing | Stewart became the first Owner–driver since Alan Kulwicki in 1992 to win a Cup championship. Stewart's third championship. Race concluded with Stewart and Carl Edwards tied in the final standings; Stewart won the championship by virtue of a tiebreaker, as he won five races while Edwards only won once. | Report |
| 2012 | Jeff Gordon | Hendrick Motorsports | Brad Keselowski | Penske Racing | Penske's first ever NASCAR Cup championship. Dodge's first championship since Richard Petty in 1975; this was also their only one in their return to NASCAR competition as well as their last, as Chrysler decided to pull out after twelve seasons. | Report |
| 2013 | Denny Hamlin | Joe Gibbs Racing | Jimmie Johnson | Hendrick Motorsports | Third win at Homestead by a non-Chase driver. Johnson's sixth championship. | Report |

==== Championship Round era ====
Highest finishing driver among four eligible for championship wins series championship.

| Year | Race winner | Team | Series champion | Team | Championship Runners-Up | Notes | Report |
|---|---|---|---|---|---|---|---|
| 2014 | Kevin Harvick | Stewart–Haas Racing | Kevin Harvick | Stewart–Haas Racing | Ryan Newman, Richard Childress Racing; Denny Hamlin, Joe Gibbs Racing; Joey Logano, Team Penske | Team owner Tony Stewart becomes the second owner-driver after Lee Petty to win championships as both a driver and an owner with Harvick's championship. | Report |
| 2015 | Kyle Busch | Joe Gibbs Racing | Kyle Busch | Joe Gibbs Racing | Kevin Harvick, Stewart–Haas Racing; Martin Truex Jr., Furniture Row Racing; Jeff Gordon, Hendrick Motorsports | Kyle Busch wins Toyota's first Cup Series championship. Busch only ran 25 races in 2015 after suffering a broken leg in the Xfinity Series race at Daytona in February; NASCAR issued him a waiver to allow him to compete in the Playoffs as long as he was in the top 30 in series points after the fall Richmond race and had won enough events to secure a wild card berth. Jeff Gordon retired from full-time competition following the race after twenty-three seasons. | Report |
| 2016 | Jimmie Johnson | Hendrick Motorsports | Jimmie Johnson | Hendrick Motorsports (7) | Kyle Busch, Joe Gibbs Racing; Carl Edwards, Joe Gibbs Racing; Joey Logano, Team Penske | Johnson's record-tying seventh and final championship. Edwards retired following the race. | Report |
| 2017 | Martin Truex Jr. | Furniture Row Racing | Martin Truex Jr. | Furniture Row Racing | Kyle Busch, Joe Gibbs Racing; Kevin Harvick, Stewart–Haas Racing; Brad Keselowski, Team Penske | Martin Truex Jr.'s first Cup Series championship. Furniture Row's only Cup Series championship. | Report |
| 2018 | Joey Logano | Team Penske | Joey Logano | Team Penske | Kyle Busch, Joe Gibbs Racing; Kevin Harvick, Stewart Haas Racing; Martin Truex Jr., Furniture Row Racing | All three races saw one of the Championship 4 drivers win both the race and championship. Brett Moffitt in the Truck Series, Tyler Reddick in the Xfinity Series, and Joey Logano in the Cup Series. | Report |
| 2019 | Kyle Busch | Joe Gibbs Racing | Kyle Busch | Joe Gibbs Racing (2) | Denny Hamlin, Joe Gibbs Racing; Kevin Harvick, Stewart Haas Racing; Martin Truex Jr., Joe Gibbs Racing | Kyle Busch becomes the only other active Cup Series driver with more than one Championship. | Report |
| 2020 | Chase Elliott | Hendrick Motorsports | Chase Elliott | Hendrick Motorsports | Denny Hamlin, Joe Gibbs Racing; Brad Keselowski, Team Penske; Joey Logano, Team Penske | Elliott and his father Bill become the third father-son pairing to win the Cup, joining Lee and Richard Petty and Ned and Dale Jarrett. Seven-time champion Jimmie Johnson retires from full-time racing after the event. | Report |
| 2021 | Kyle Larson | Hendrick Motorsports | Kyle Larson | Hendrick Motorsports | Martin Truex Jr., Joe Gibbs Racing; Denny Hamlin, Joe Gibbs Racing; Chase Elliott, Hendrick Motorsports | Larson tied Tony Stewart's record of five victories during the Chase/Playoffs. The victory was his tenth of the season, making him the first driver since Jimmie Johnson in 2007 to record double-digit victories in a single season. | Report |
| 2022 | Joey Logano | Team Penske | Joey Logano | Team Penske (2) | Christopher Bell, Joe Gibbs Racing; Ross Chastain, Trackhouse Racing; Chase Elliott, Hendrick Motorsports | Logano recorded his fourth win of the season to win the championship. He joined Kyle Busch as only the second active driver with multiple Cup Series championships. Elliott's No. 9 car did not contend for the owner's championship; Hendrick's No. 5 car, driven by Larson, was instead part of the owner's Championship 4. | Report |
| 2023 | Ross Chastain | Trackhouse Racing | Ryan Blaney | Team Penske | Kyle Larson, Hendrick Motorsports; Christopher Bell, Joe Gibbs Racing; William Byron, Hendrick Motorsports | Blaney finishes second in the race, marking the first time since the Championship Round was introduced that the Cup Series champion did not also win the race. Team Penske wins third Cup Series championship with third different driver (Keselowski, Logano). 2014 champion Kevin Harvick retires following the race. | Report |
| 2024 | Joey Logano | Team Penske | Joey Logano | Team Penske (3) | Ryan Blaney, Team Penske; Joey Logano, Team Penske; Tyler Reddick, 23XI Racing; William Byron, Hendrick Motorsports | Team Penske joins Hendrick Motorsports and Junior Johnson & Associates as the only teams to win three consecutive Cup Series championships. First time in Playoff Era that Joe Gibbs Racing does not qualify for Championship Round. 2017 champion Martin Truex Jr. retires following the race. Two-time champion team Stewart–Haas Racing ceases operations after the event. | |
| 2025 | Ryan Blaney | Team Penske | Kyle Larson | Hendrick Motorsports | Chase Briscoe, Joe Gibbs Racing; William Byron, Hendrick Motorsports; Denny Hamlin, Joe Gibbs Racing | Larson finishes third in championship race. He joins Jeff Gordon and Jimmie Johnson as drivers who have won multiple Cup Series championships while driving for Hendrick Motorsports. | |

==== Second Chase era ====
| Year | Race winner | Team | Series champion | Team | Notes |
|---|---|---|---|---|---|
| 2026 | Ryan Blaney | Penske Racing | Kyle Larson | Hendrick Motorsports | Larson becomes first driver since Jimmie Johnson to win consecutive championships; Johnson won his fifth consecutive championship in 2010. |

== See also ==
- NASCAR Cup Series Championship Race
- NASCAR O'Reilly Auto Parts Series Championship Race
- NASCAR Craftsman Truck Series Championship Race
