= 2018 Ford EcoBoost 400 =

Race details
- Race 36 of 36 in the 2018 Monster Energy NASCAR Cup Series
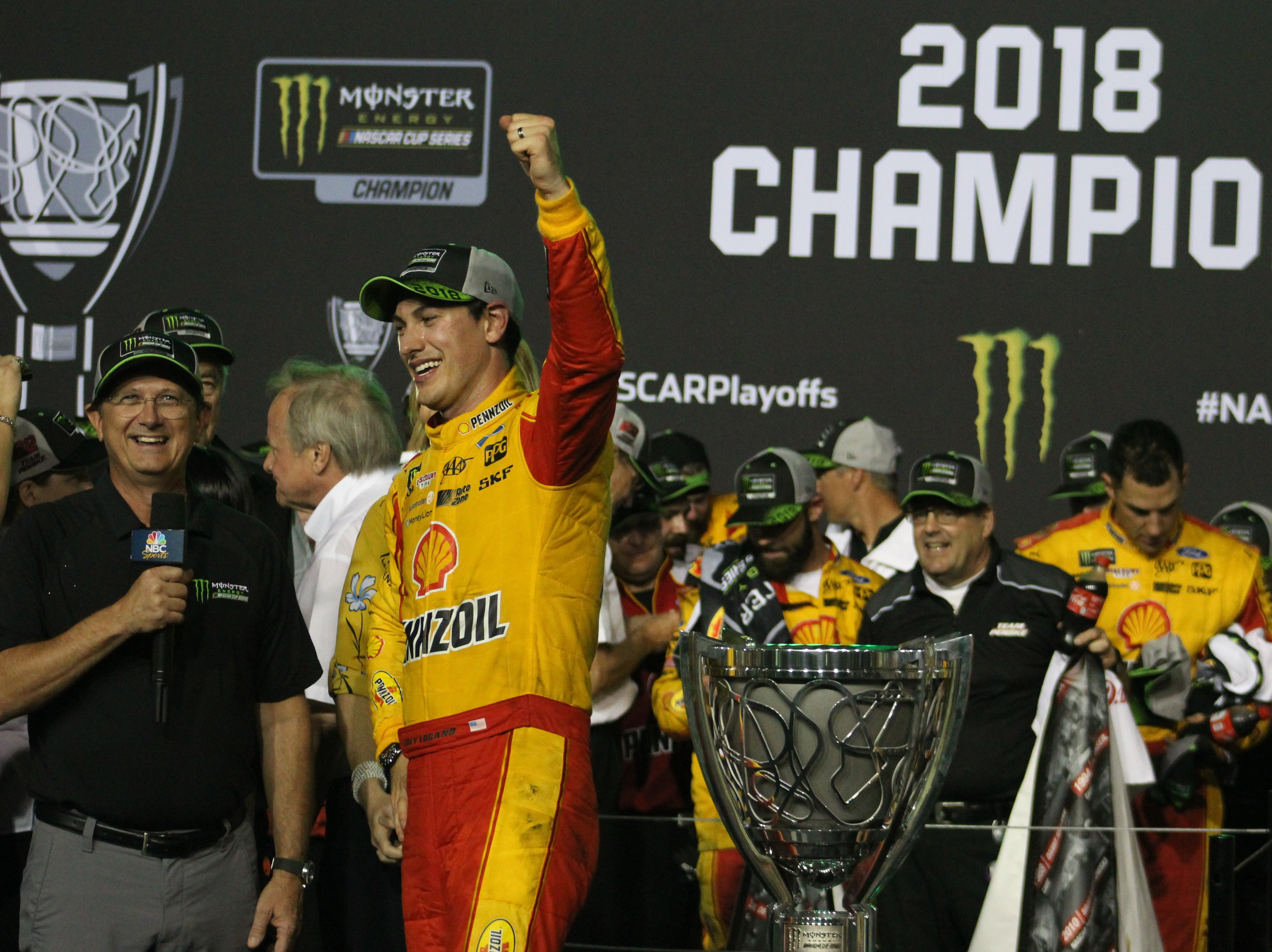
- Date: November 18, 2018
- Location: Homestead–Miami Speedway in Homestead, Florida
- Course: Permanent racing facility
- Course length: 1.5 miles (2.4 km)
- Distance: 267 laps, 400.5 mi (640.8 km)
- Average speed: 133.056 miles per hour (214.133 km/h)

Pole position
Driver	Denny Hamlin	Joe Gibbs Racing
- Time: 31.059

Most laps led
Driver	Joey Logano	Team Penske
- Laps: 80

Winner
No. 22	Joey Logano	Team Penske

Television in the United States
- Network: NBC
- Announcers: Rick Allen, Jeff Burton, Steve Letarte and Dale Earnhardt Jr.
- Nielsen ratings: 2.5 (Overnight)

Radio in the United States
- Radio: MRN
- Booth announcers: Joe Moore, Jeff Striegle and Rusty Wallace
- Turn announcers: Dave Moody (1 & 2) and Mike Bagley (3 & 4)

The 2018 Ford EcoBoost 400 was a Monster Energy NASCAR Cup Series race that was held on November 18, 2018, at Homestead–Miami Speedway in Homestead, Florida. Contested over 267 laps on the 1.5 mile (2.4 km) oval, it was the 36th and final race of the 2018 Monster Energy NASCAR Cup Series season. Joey Logano won the race, claiming his first Cup Series championship.

== Report ==
=== Background ===
Homestead–Miami Speedway, the track where the race was held.

Homestead–Miami Speedway is a motorsport track located in Homestead, Florida. The track, which has several configurations, has promoted several series of racing, including NASCAR, the IndyCar Series, the Grand-Am Rolex Sports Car Series and the Championship Cup Series.

From 2002 to 2019, Homestead–Miami Speedway hosted the final race of the season in all three of NASCAR's series: the Cup Series, the Xfinity Series, and the Camping World Truck Series. Ford Motor Company sponsored all three of the season-ending races, under the names Ford EcoBoost 400, Ford EcoBoost 300, and Ford EcoBoost 200, respectively. The weekend itself was marketed as Ford Championship Weekend. The Xfinity Series held its season-ending races at Homestead from 1995 until 2020, when it was moved to Phoenix Raceway, along with NASCAR's other two series.

==== Championship drivers ====
Joey Logano was the first of the four drivers to clinch a spot in the Championship 4, winning the first race of the Round of 8 at Martinsville.

Kyle Busch clinched the second spot in the Championship 4 based on points at the Phoenix race when Ricky Stenhouse Jr. crashed out of the race and finished 33rd. Busch had to finish at least 33rd to be locked in on points. He later clinched a playoff berth anyway by winning the race.

Martin Truex Jr. clinched the third spot in the Championship 4 based on points.

Kevin Harvick clinched the final spot based on points after his Texas win was encumbered after a spoiler violation.

==== Entry list ====
No.	Driver	Team	Manufacturer
00	Landon Cassill (i)	StarCom Racing	Chevrolet
1	Jamie McMurray	Chip Ganassi Racing	Chevrolet
2	Brad Keselowski	Team Penske	Ford
3	Austin Dillon	Richard Childress Racing	Chevrolet
4	Kevin Harvick (CC)	Stewart–Haas Racing	Ford
6	Matt Kenseth	Roush–Fenway Racing	Ford
9	Chase Elliott	Hendrick Motorsports	Chevrolet
10	Aric Almirola	Stewart–Haas Racing	Ford
11	Denny Hamlin	Joe Gibbs Racing	Toyota
12	Ryan Blaney	Team Penske	Ford
13	Ty Dillon	Germain Racing	Chevrolet
14	Clint Bowyer	Stewart–Haas Racing	Ford
15	Ross Chastain (i)	Premium Motorsports	Chevrolet
17	Ricky Stenhouse Jr.	Roush–Fenway Racing	Ford
18	Kyle Busch (CC)	Joe Gibbs Racing	Toyota
19	Daniel Suárez	Joe Gibbs Racing	Toyota
20	Erik Jones	Joe Gibbs Racing	Toyota
21	Paul Menard	Wood Brothers Racing	Ford
22	Joey Logano (CC)	Team Penske	Ford
23	J. J. Yeley (i)	BK Racing	Ford
24	William Byron (R)	Hendrick Motorsports	Chevrolet
31	Ryan Newman	Richard Childress Racing	Chevrolet
32	Matt DiBenedetto	Go Fas Racing	Ford
34	Michael McDowell	Front Row Motorsports	Ford
37	Chris Buescher	JTG Daugherty Racing	Chevrolet
38	David Ragan	Front Row Motorsports	Ford
41	Kurt Busch	Stewart–Haas Racing	Ford
42	Kyle Larson	Chip Ganassi Racing	Chevrolet
43	Bubba Wallace (R)	Richard Petty Motorsports	Chevrolet
47	A. J. Allmendinger	JTG Daugherty Racing	Chevrolet
48	Jimmie Johnson	Hendrick Motorsports	Chevrolet
51	B. J. McLeod (i)	Rick Ware Racing	Ford
66	Timmy Hill (i)	MBM Motorsports	Toyota
72	Corey LaJoie	TriStar Motorsports	Chevrolet
78	Martin Truex Jr. (CC)	Furniture Row Racing	Toyota
88	Alex Bowman	Hendrick Motorsports	Chevrolet
95	Regan Smith	Leavine Family Racing	Chevrolet
97	Tanner Berryhill	Obaika Racing	Toyota
99	Kyle Weatherman	StarCom Racing	Chevrolet
Official entry list

== First practice ==
Martin Truex Jr. was the fastest in the first practice session with a time of 31.035 seconds and a speed of 173.997 mph (280.021 km/h).

Pos	No.	Driver	Team	Manufacturer	Time	Speed
1	78	Martin Truex Jr.	Furniture Row Racing	Toyota	31.035	173.997
2	18	Kyle Busch	Joe Gibbs Racing	Toyota	31.160	173.299
3	14	Clint Bowyer	Stewart–Haas Racing	Ford	31.218	172.828
Official first practice results

== Qualifying ==
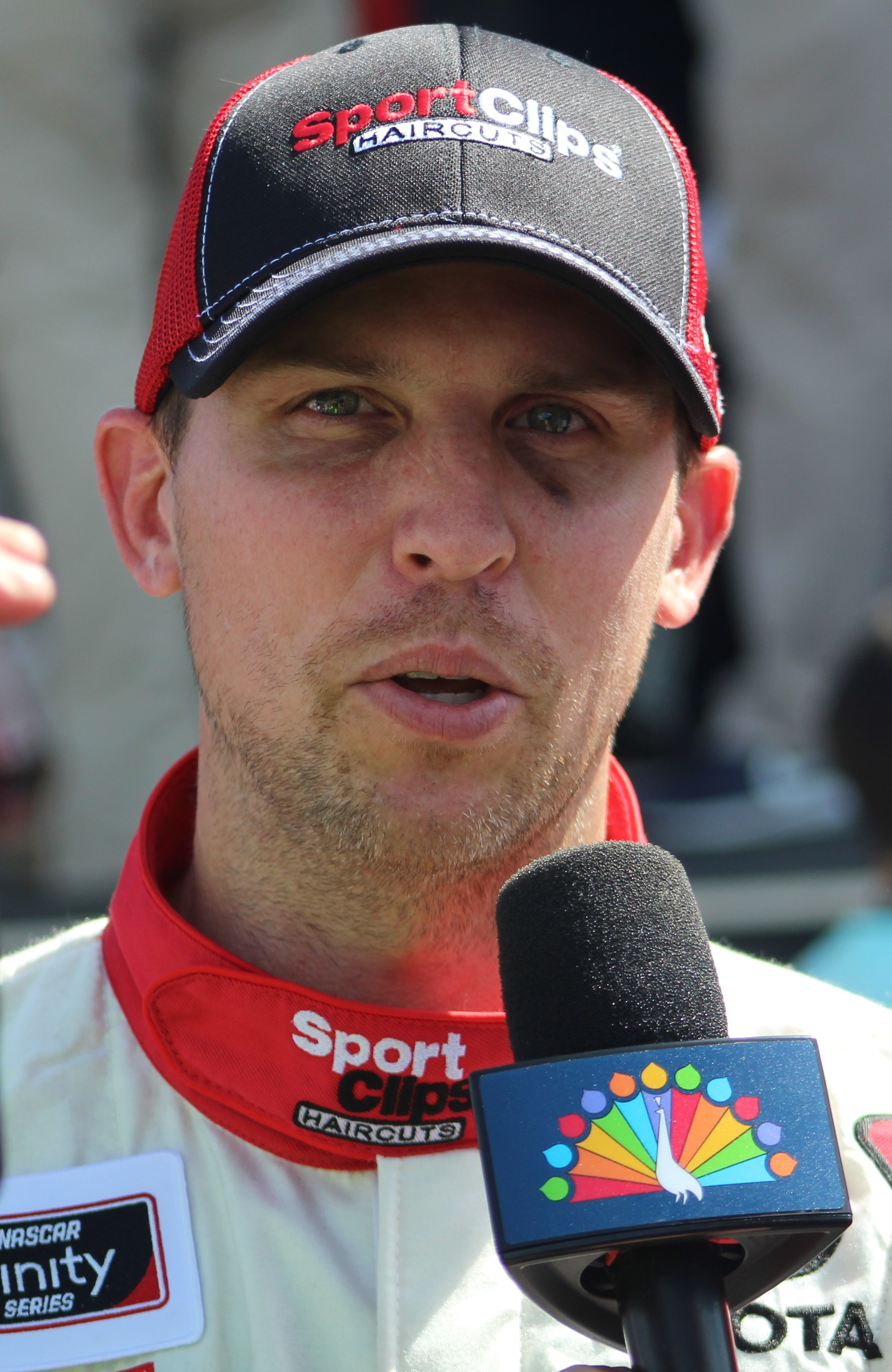
Denny Hamlin scored the pole position.

Denny Hamlin scored the pole for the race with a time of 31.059 and a speed of 173.863 mph (279.805 km/h).

=== Qualifying results ===
Pos	No.	Driver	Team	Manufacturer	R1	R2	R3
1	11	Denny Hamlin	Joe Gibbs Racing	Toyota	31.112	31.243	31.059
2	18	Kyle Busch (CC)	Joe Gibbs Racing	Toyota	30.920	31.112	31.102
3	78	Martin Truex Jr. (CC)	Furniture Row Racing	Toyota	31.013	31.045	31.117
4	2	Brad Keselowski	Team Penske	Ford	31.031	31.139	31.136
5	22	Joey Logano (CC)	Team Penske	Ford	30.949	31.122	31.148
6	41	Kurt Busch	Stewart–Haas Racing	Ford	31.088	31.165	31.298
7	20	Erik Jones	Joe Gibbs Racing	Toyota	31.301	31.028	31.303
8	31	Ryan Newman	Richard Childress Racing	Chevrolet	31.113	31.258	31.317
9	17	Ricky Stenhouse Jr.	Roush–Fenway Racing	Ford	31.215	31.147	31.322
10	10	Aric Almirola	Stewart—Haas Racing	Ford	31.250	31.221	31.331
11	42	Kyle Larson	Chip Ganassi Racing	Chevrolet	31.283	31.293	31.390
12	4	Kevin Harvick (CC)	Stewart–Haas Racing	Ford	31.259	31.182	31.406
13	88	Alex Bowman	Hendrick Motorsports	Chevrolet	31.187	31.299	—
14	9	Chase Elliott	Hendrick Motorsports	Chevrolet	31.225	31.301	—
15	12	Ryan Blaney	Team Penske	Ford	31.051	31.345	—
16	3	Austin Dillon	Richard Childress Racing	Chevrolet	31.231	31.351	—
17	6	Matt Kenseth	Roush–Fenway Racing	Ford	31.296	31.359	—
18	19	Daniel Suárez	Joe Gibbs Racing	Toyota	31.135	31.395	—
19	48	Jimmie Johnson	Hendrick Motorsports	Chevrolet	31.291	31.404	—
20	47	A. J. Allmendinger	JTG Daugherty Racing	Chevrolet	31.369	31.476	—
21	1	Jamie McMurray	Chip Ganassi Racing	Chevrolet	31.288	31.482	—
22	21	Paul Menard	Wood Brothers Racing	Ford	31.224	31.511	—
23	43	Bubba Wallace (R)	Richard Petty Motorsports	Chevrolet	31.371	31.574	—
24	34	Michael McDowell	Front Row Motorsports	Ford	31.360	31.633	—
25	38	David Ragan	Front Row Motorsports	Ford	31.393	—	—
26	14	Clint Bowyer	Stewart–Haas Racing	Ford	31.427	—	—
27	37	Chris Buescher	JTG Daugherty Racing	Chevrolet	31.536	—	—
28	24	William Byron (R)	Hendrick Motorsports	Chevrolet	31.616	—	—
29	32	Matt DiBenedetto	Go Fas Racing	Ford	31.672	—	—
30	95	Regan Smith	Leavine Family Racing	Chevrolet	31.818	—	—
31	13	Ty Dillon	Germain Racing	Chevrolet	31.830	—	—
32	00	Landon Cassill	StarCom Racing	Chevrolet	31.962	—	—
33	23	J. J. Yeley (i)	BK Racing	Ford	32.297	—	—
34	72	Corey LaJoie	TriStar Motorsports	Chevrolet	32.335	—	—
35	99	Kyle Weatherman	StarCom Racing	Chevrolet	32.355	—	—
36	51	B. J. McLeod (i)	Rick Ware Racing	Ford	32.842	—	—
37	97	Tanner Berryhill	Obaika Racing	Toyota	33.138	—	—
38	66	Timmy Hill (i)	MBM Motorsports	Toyota	33.414	—	—
39	15	Ross Chastain (i)	Premium Motorsports	Chevrolet	0.000	—	—
Official qualifying results

== Practice (post-qualifying) ==
=== Second practice ===
Joey Logano was the fastest in the second practice session with a time of 31.838 seconds and a speed of 169.609 mph (272.959 km/h).

Pos	No.	Driver	Team	Manufacturer	Time	Speed
1	22	Joey Logano	Team Penske	Ford	31.838	169.609
2	10	Aric Almirola	Stewart–Haas Racing	Ford	31.916	169.194
3	11	Denny Hamlin	Joe Gibbs Racing	Toyota	32.049	168.492
Official second practice results

=== Final practice ===
Joey Logano was the fastest in the final practice session with a time of 31.450 seconds and a speed of 171.701 mph (276.326 km/h).

Pos	No.	Driver	Team	Manufacturer	Time	Speed
1	22	Joey Logano	Team Penske	Ford	31.450	171.701
2	78	Martin Truex Jr.	Furniture Row Racing	Toyota	31.656	170.584
3	2	Brad Keselowski	Team Penske	Ford	31.685	170.428
Official final practice results

== Race ==
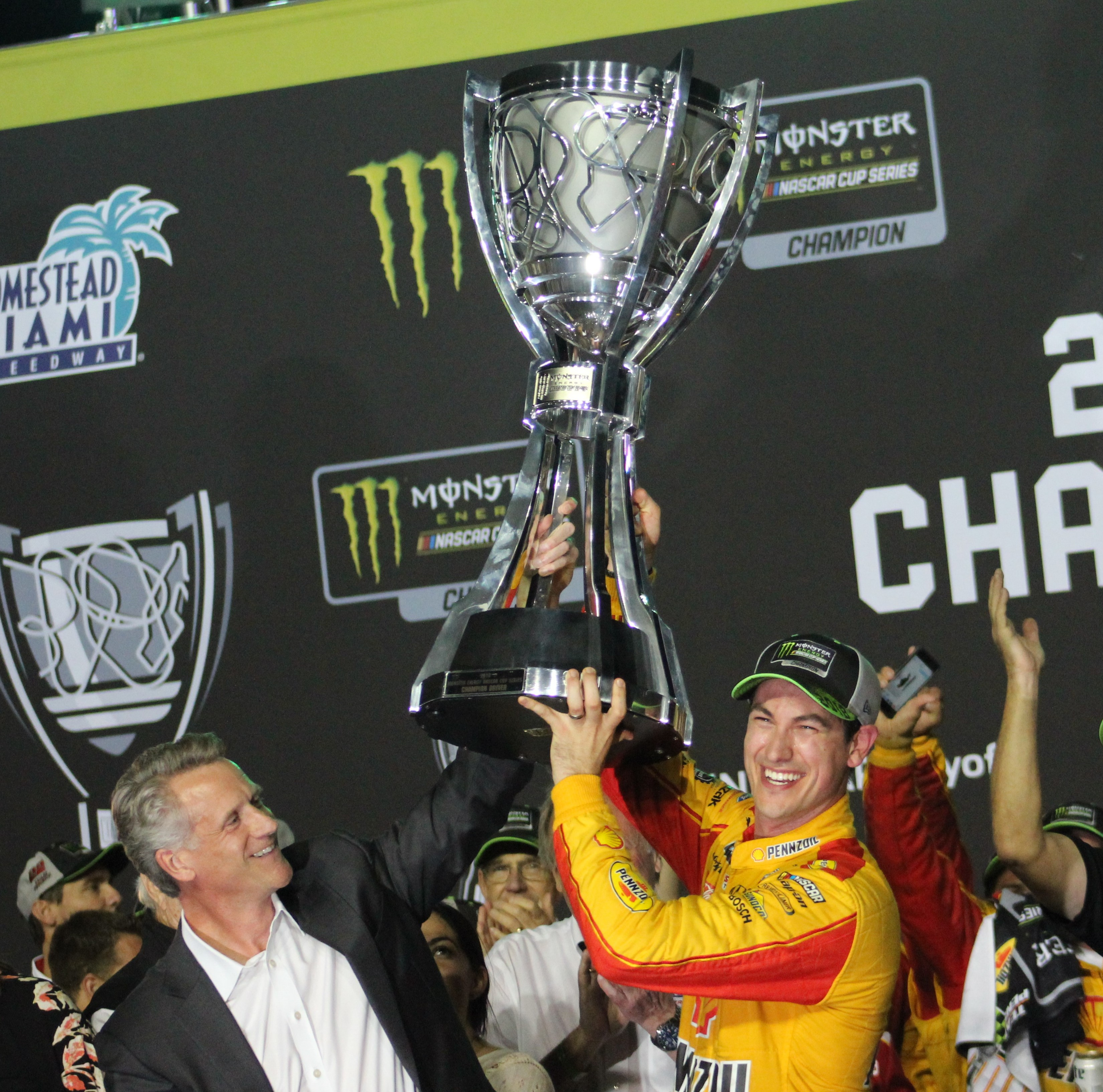
Joey Logano won the race and his first Cup Series championship title.

Note: Joey Logano, Kevin Harvick, Martin Truex Jr., and Kyle Busch were not eligible for stage points in this race because of their participation as the Championship 4 drivers.

=== Stage Results ===
Stage 1 Laps: 80

Pos	No	Driver	Team	Manufacturer	Points
1	4	Kevin Harvick (CC)	Stewart–Haas Racing	Ford	0
2	42	Kyle Larson	Chip Ganassi Racing	Chevrolet	9
3	18	Kyle Busch (CC)	Joe Gibbs Racing	Toyota	0
4	22	Joey Logano (CC)	Team Penske	Ford	0
5	78	Martin Truex Jr. (CC)	Furniture Row Racing	Toyota	0
6	11	Denny Hamlin	Joe Gibbs Racing	Toyota	5
7	10	Aric Almirola	Stewart–Haas Racing	Ford	4
8	20	Erik Jones	Joe Gibbs Racing	Toyota	3
9	2	Brad Keselowski	Team Penske	Ford	2
10	41	Kurt Busch	Stewart–Haas Racing	Ford	1
Official stage one results

Stage 2 Laps: 80

Pos	No	Driver	Team	Manufacturer	Points
1	42	Kyle Larson	Chip Ganassi Racing	Chevrolet	10
2	4	Kevin Harvick (CC)	Stewart–Haas Racing	Ford	0
3	22	Joey Logano (CC)	Team Penske	Ford	0
4	78	Martin Truex Jr. (CC)	Furniture Row Racing	Toyota	0
5	10	Aric Almirola	Stewart–Haas Racing	Ford	6
6	18	Kyle Busch (CC)	Joe Gibbs Racing	Toyota	0
7	41	Kurt Busch	Stewart–Haas Racing	Ford	4
8	11	Denny Hamlin	Joe Gibbs Racing	Toyota	3
9	48	Jimmie Johnson	Hendrick Motorsports	Chevrolet	2
10	14	Clint Bowyer	Stewart–Haas Racing	Ford	1
Official stage two results

=== Final Stage Results ===
Stage 3 Laps: 107

Pos	Grid	No	Driver	Team	Manufacturer	Laps	Points
1	5	22	Joey Logano (CC)	Team Penske	Ford	267	40
2	3	78	Martin Truex Jr. (CC)	Furniture Row Racing	Toyota	267	35
3	12	4	Kevin Harvick (CC)	Stewart–Haas Racing	Ford	267	34
4	2	18	Kyle Busch (CC)	Joe Gibbs Racing	Toyota	267	33
5	4	2	Brad Keselowski	Team Penske	Ford	267	34
6	17	6	Matt Kenseth	Roush–Fenway Racing	Ford	267	31
7	14	9	Chase Elliott	Hendrick Motorsports	Chevrolet	267	30
8	26	14	Clint Bowyer	Stewart–Haas Racing	Ford	267	30
9	10	10	Aric Almirola	Stewart–Haas Racing	Ford	267	38
10	6	41	Kurt Busch	Stewart–Haas Racing	Ford	267	32
11	16	3	Austin Dillon	Richard Childress Racing	Chevrolet	267	26
12	1	11	Denny Hamlin	Joe Gibbs Racing	Toyota	267	33
13	11	42	Kyle Larson	Chip Ganassi Racing	Chevrolet	267	43
14	19	48	Jimmie Johnson	Hendrick Motorsports	Chevrolet	267	25
15	8	31	Ryan Newman	Richard Childress Racing	Chevrolet	267	22
16	9	17	Ricky Stenhouse Jr.	Roush–Fenway Racing	Ford	267	21
17	15	12	Ryan Blaney	Team Penske	Ford	267	20
18	21	1	Jamie McMurray	Chip Ganassi Racing	Chevrolet	267	19
19	20	47	A. J. Allmendinger	JTG Daugherty Racing	Chevrolet	266	18
20	25	38	David Ragan	Front Row Motorsports	Ford	266	17
21	23	43	Bubba Wallace (R)	Richard Petty Motorsports	Chevrolet	266	16
22	31	13	Ty Dillon	Germain Racing	Chevrolet	266	15
23	27	37	Chris Buescher	JTG Daugherty Racing	Chevrolet	266	14
24	28	24	William Byron (R)	Hendrick Motorsports	Chevrolet	266	13
25	22	21	Paul Menard	Wood Brothers Racing	Ford	265	12
26	29	32	Matt DiBenedetto	Go Fas Racing	Ford	264	11
27	7	20	Erik Jones	Joe Gibbs Racing	Toyota	264	13
28	24	34	Michael McDowell	Front Row Motorsports	Ford	263	9
29	13	88	Alex Bowman	Hendrick Motorsports	Chevrolet	263	8
30	18	19	Daniel Suárez	Joe Gibbs Racing	Toyota	262	7
31	32	00	Landon Cassill (i)	StarCom Racing	Chevrolet	262	0
32	33	23	J. J. Yeley (i)	BK Racing	Ford	261	0
33	39	15	Ross Chastain (i)	Premium Motorsports	Chevrolet	259	0
34	34	72	Corey LaJoie	TriStar Motorsports	Chevrolet	259	3
35	36	51	B. J. McLeod (i)	Rick Ware Racing	Ford	256	0
36	35	99	Kyle Weatherman	StarCom Racing	Chevrolet	256	1
37	38	66	Timmy Hill (i)	MBM Motorsports	Toyota	254	0
38	37	97	Tanner Berryhill	Obaika Racing	Toyota	254	1
39	30	95	Regan Smith	Leavine Family Racing	Chevrolet	240	1
Official race results

=== Race statistics ===
- Lead changes: 22 among 7 different drivers
- Cautions/Laps: 5 for 26
- Red flags: 0
- Time of race: 3 hours, 0 minutes and 36 seconds
- Average speed: 133.056 miles per hour (214.133 km/h)

== Media ==
=== Television ===
NBC covered the race on the television side. Rick Allen, Jeff Burton, Steve Letarte and Dale Earnhardt Jr. had the call in the booth for the race. Dave Burns, Parker Kligerman, Marty Snider and Kelli Stavast reported from pit lane during the race. While the race itself aired on NBC, NBCSN aired NBCSN NASCAR Hot Pass, a simultaneous live feed dedicated to each of the Championship drivers, with commentary by Leigh Diffey and Dale Jarrett. Also, three different angles from in-car cameras and a track map tracked the driver's position and changes throughout the field.

NBC
Booth announcers	Pit reporters
Lap-by-lap: Rick Allen; Color-commentator: Jeff Burton; Color-commentator: Steve Letarte; Color-commentator: Dale Earnhardt Jr.	Dave Burns; Parker Kligerman; Marty Snider; Kelli Stavast

=== Radio ===
MRN had the radio call for the race, which was simulcast on SiriusXM's NASCAR Radio.

MRN
Booth announcers	Turn announcers	Pit reporters
Lead announcer: Joe Moore; Announcer: Jeff Striegle; Announcer: Rusty Wallace	Turns 1 & 2: Dave Moody; Turns 3 & 4: Mike Bagley	Alex Hayden; Winston Kelley; Steve Post; Kim Coon

== Standings after the race ==
	Pos	Driver	Points
	1	Joey Logano	5,040
1	2	Martin Truex Jr.	5,035 (–5)
1	3	Kevin Harvick	5,034 (–6)
2	4	Kyle Busch	5,033 (–7)
2	5	Aric Almirola	2,354 (–2,686)
1	6	Chase Elliott	2,350 (–2,690)
1	7	Kurt Busch	2,350 (–2,690)
	8	Brad Keselowski	2,343 (–2,697)
1	9	Kyle Larson	2,299 (–2,741)
1	10	Ryan Blaney	2,298 (–2,742)
	11	Denny Hamlin	2,285 (–2,755)
	12	Clint Bowyer	2,272 (–2,768)
	13	Austin Dillon	2,245 (–2,795)
	14	Jimmie Johnson	2,242 (–2,798)
	15	Erik Jones	2,220 (–2,820)
	16	Alex Bowman	2,204 (–2,836)
Official driver's standings

Manufacturers' Championship standings

Pos	Manufacturer	Points
1	Ford	1,310
2	Toyota	1,286 (–24)
3	Chevrolet	1,187 (–123)
Official manufacturers' standings

- Note: Only the first 16 positions are included for the driver standings.

Previous race: 2018 Can-Am 500	Monster Energy NASCAR Cup Series; 2018 season	Next race: 2019 Daytona 500
