= 2004 Ford 400 =

Race details
- Race 36 of 36 in the 2004 NASCAR Nextel Cup Series
- 2004 Ford 400 program cover
- Date: November 21, 2004
- Location: Homestead Miami Speedway, Homestead, Florida
- Course: Permanent racing facility
- Course length: 1.5 miles (2.414 km)
- Distance: 271 laps, 406.5 mi (654.198 km)
- Scheduled distance: 267 laps, 400.5 mi (644.542 km)
- Weather: Temperatures averaging about 73.3 °F (22.9 °C); wind speeds reaching up to 10.2 miles per hour (16.4 km/h)
- Average speed: 105.623 miles per hour (169.984 km/h)

Pole position
Driver	Kurt Busch	Roush Racing
- Time: 30.114

Most laps led
Driver	Greg Biffle	Roush Racing
- Laps: 117

Winner
No. 16	Greg Biffle	Roush Racing

Television in the United States
- Network: NBC
- Announcers: Allen Bestwick, Benny Parsons, & Wally Dallenbach Jr.

The 2004 Ford 400 was a NASCAR Nextel Cup Series race held on November 21, 2004 at Homestead–Miami Speedway in Homestead, Florida. Contested over 271 laps on the 1.5-mile (2.4-kilometre) speedway, it was the 36th and final race of the 2004 NASCAR Nextel Cup Series season. Greg Biffle won the race and Kurt Busch won the championship, both driving for Roush Racing. This was the last race without Kyle Busch until the 2011 AAA Texas 500.

== Background ==
Homestead–Miami Speedway is a motor racing track located in Homestead, Florida. The track, which has several configurations, has promoted several series of racing, including NASCAR, the IndyCar Series, the Grand-Am Rolex Sports Car Series and the Championship Cup Series.

From 2002 to 2019, Homestead–Miami Speedway hosted the final race of the season in all three of NASCAR's series: the Sprint Cup Series, Xfinity Series and the Camping World Truck Series. Ford Motor Company sponsors all three of the season-ending races; the races have the names Ford 400, Ford 300 and Ford 200, respectively, and the weekend is marketed as Ford Championship Weekend.

== Entry list ==
#	Driver	Team	Make	Sponsor
0	Mike Bliss	Haas CNC Racing	Chevrolet	NetZero
00	Kenny Wallace	Michael Waltrip Racing	Toyota	Aaron's
1	Martin Truex Jr.	Dale Earnhardt, Inc.	Chevrolet	Enterprise Rent-A-Car
01	Joe Nemechek	MBV Motorsports	Chevrolet	U.S. Army
2	Rusty Wallace	Penske-Jasper Racing	Ford	Miller Lite
02	Hermie Sadler	SCORE Motorsports	Chevrolet	Drive for Diversity, Sam Bass
4	Mike Wallace	Morgan–McClure Motorsports	Chevrolet	Lucas Oil
5	Terry Labonte	Hendrick Motorsports	Chevrolet	Kellogg's
6	Mark Martin	Roush Racing	Ford	Viagra
06	Travis Kvapil	Penske-Jasper Racing	Dodge	Mobil 1, Jasper Engines & Transmissions
8	Dale Earnhardt Jr.	Dale Earnhardt, Inc.	Chevrolet	Budweiser
9	Kasey Kahne	Evernham Motorsports	Dodge	Dodge Dealers, UAW
09	Johnny Sauter	Phoenix Racing	Dodge	Miccosukee Gaming & Resorts
10	Scott Riggs	MBV Motorsports	Chevrolet	Valvoline
11	J. J. Yeley	Joe Gibbs Racing	Chevrolet	Vigoro, The Home Depot
12	Ryan Newman	Penske-Jasper Racing	Dodge	Alltel
13	Greg Sacks	Sacks Motorsports	Ford	ARC Dehooker, Vita Coco
14	John Andretti	ppc Racing	Ford	VB, APlus at Sunoco
15	Michael Waltrip	Dale Earnhardt, Inc.	Chevrolet	NAPA Auto Parts
16	Greg Biffle	Roush Racing	Ford	National Guard, Subway
17	Matt Kenseth	Roush Racing	Ford	DeWalt
18	Bobby Labonte	Joe Gibbs Racing	Pontiac	Interstate Batteries
19	Jeremy Mayfield	Evernham Motorsports	Dodge	Dodge Dealers, UAW
20	Tony Stewart	Joe Gibbs Racing	Toyota	Home Depot
21	Ricky Rudd	Wood Brothers Racing	Ford	Motorcraft, U.S. Air Force
22	Scott Wimmer	Bill Davis Racing	Dodge	Caterpillar
23	Shane Hmiel	Bill Davis Racing	Dodge	Bill Davis Racing
24	Jeff Gordon	Hendrick Motorsports	Chevrolet	DuPont
25	Brian Vickers	Hendrick Motorsports	Chevrolet	GMAC Financial Services
29	Kevin Harvick	Richard Childress Racing	Chevrolet	GM Goodwrench
30	Jeff Burton	Richard Childress Racing	Chevrolet	America Online
31	Robby Gordon	Richard Childress Racing	Chevrolet	Cingular Wireless
32	Bobby Hamilton Jr.	PPI Motorsports	Chevrolet	Tide
36	Boris Said	MB2 Motorsports	Chevrolet	USG Durock
37	Kevin Lepage	R&J Racing	Dodge	Carter's Royal Dispos-all
38	Elliott Sadler	Robert Yates Racing	Ford	M&M's
40	Sterling Marlin	Chip Ganassi Racing	Dodge	Lone Star Steakhouse & Saloon, Coors Light
41	Casey Mears	Chip Ganassi Racing	Dodge	Target
42	Jamie McMurray	Chip Ganassi Racing	Dodge	Texaco, Havoline
43	Jeff Green	Petty Enterprises	Dodge	Chex Party Mix
45	Kyle Petty	Petty Enterprises	Ford	Georgia-Pacific, Brawny
48	Jimmie Johnson	Hendrick Motorsports	Chevrolet	Lowe's
49	Ken Schrader	BAM Racing	Dodge	Schwan's Home Service
50	Todd Bodine	Arnold Motorsports	Dodge	Arnold Development Companies
51	Tony Raines	Competitive Edge Motorsports	Chevrolet	Consort Hair Care for Men
70	Larry Foyt	BAM Racing	Dodge	BAM Racing
72	Kirk Shelmerdine	Kirk Shelmerdine Racing	Ford	Freddie B's
75	Mike Garvey	Haefele Racing	Dodge	Jani-King
77	Brendan Gaughan	Penske-Jasper Racing	Dodge	Kodak, Jasper Engines & Transmissions
80	Carl Long	Hover Motorsports	Ford	Adesa Impact
88	Dale Jarrett	Robert Yates Racing	Ford	UPS
89	Morgan Shepherd	Shepherd Racing Ventures	Ford	Racing With Jesus, Red Line Oil
93	Geoff Bodine	GIC–Mixon Motorsports	Chevrolet	Global Industrial Contractors
97	Kurt Busch	Roush Racing	Ford	Sharpie, Irwin Industrial Tools
98	Randy LaJoie	Mach 1 Motorsports	Ford	Mach One Inc.
99	Carl Edwards	Roush Racing	Ford	Roush Racing

== Qualifying ==
Qualifying took place on November 19, 2004. During Casey Mears' warmup lap, Mears would lose the back end of his car in the middle of Turns 3 and 4, slamming the back end into the wall and destroying the car. Mears would not be able to complete a lap in qualifying, so the No. 41 team took a provisional because the team was in the Top 35 in owner's points. However, they would have to start in the back because they had to bring in a backup car. The No. 93 of Geoff Bodine would also not run qualifying laps, this time due to unspecified reasons and would withdraw from the event.

Pos.	#	Driver	Make	Team	Time	Avg. Speed (mph)
1	97	Kurt Busch	Ford	Roush Racing	30.114	179.319
2	16	Greg Biffle	Ford	Roush Racing	30.116	179.307
3	12	Ryan Newman	Dodge	Penske-Jasper Racing	30.152	179.093
4	9	Kasey Kahne	Dodge	Evernham Motorsports	30.186	178.891
5	24	Jeff Gordon	Chevrolet	Hendrick Motorsports	30.215	178.719
6	18	Bobby Labonte	Chevrolet	Joe Gibbs Racing	30.245	178.542
7	21	Ricky Rudd	Ford	Wood Brothers Racing	30.336	178.006
8	20	Tony Stewart	Chevrolet	Joe Gibbs Racing	30.360	177.866
9	29	Kevin Harvick	Chevrolet	Richard Childress Racing	30.370	177.807
10	2	Rusty Wallace	Dodge	Penske-Jasper Racing	30.387	177.708
11	6	Mark Martin	Ford	Roush Racing	30.405	177.602
12	0	Mike Bliss	Chevrolet	Haas CNC Racing	30.425	177.486
13	23	Shane Hmiel	Dodge	Bill Davis Racing	30.436	177.421
14	25	Brian Vickers	Chevrolet	Hendrick Motorsports	30.471	177.218
15	38	Elliott Sadler	Ford	Robert Yates Racing	30.475	177.194
16	8	Dale Earnhardt, Jr.	Chevrolet	Dale Earnhardt, Inc.	30.491	177.101
17	77	Brendan Gaughan	Dodge	Penske-Jasper Racing	30.497	177.067
18	42	Jamie McMurray	Dodge	Chip Ganassi Racing	30.504	177.026
19	01	Joe Nemechek	Chevrolet	MBV Motorsports	30.522	176.922
20	19	Jeremy Mayfield	Dodge	Evernham Motorsports	30.529	176.881
21	22	Scott Wimmer	Dodge	Bill Davis Racing	30.531	176.869
22	99	Carl Edwards	Ford	Roush Racing	30.535	176.846
23	14	John Andretti	Ford	ppc Racing	30.535	176.846
24	15	Michael Waltrip	Chevrolet	Dale Earnhardt, Inc.	30.595	176.499
25	10	Scott Riggs	Chevrolet	MBV Motorsports	30.601	176.465
26	06	Travis Kvapil	Dodge	Penske-Jasper Racing	30.642	176.229
27	88	Dale Jarrett	Ford	Robert Yates Racing	30.667	176.085
28	4	Mike Wallace	Chevrolet	Morgan–McClure Motorsports	30.671	176.062
29	32	Bobby Hamilton, Jr.	Chevrolet	PPI Motorsports	30.719	175.787
30	17	Matt Kenseth	Ford	Roush Racing	30.723	175.764
31	43	Jeff Green	Dodge	Petty Enterprises	30.742	175.656
32	36	Boris Said	Chevrolet	MB2 Motorsports	30.758	175.564
33	31	Robby Gordon	Chevrolet	Richard Childress Racing	30.766	175.518
34	13	Greg Sacks	Dodge	Sacks Motorsports	30.801	175.319
35	1	Martin Truex, Jr.	Chevrolet	Dale Earnhardt, Inc.	30.812	175.256
36	02	Hermie Sadler	Chevrolet	SCORE Motorsports	30.814	175.245
37	00	Kenny Wallace	Chevrolet	Michael Waltrip Racing	30.849	175.046
38	40	Sterling Marlin	Dodge	Chip Ganassi Racing	30.850	175.040
Provisionals
39	48	Jimmie Johnson (Note: Qualified for the race due to being in the top-35 placings of the owners' championship.)	Chevrolet	Hendrick Motorsports	30.852	175.029
40	30	Jeff Burton	Chevrolet	Richard Childress Racing	30.866	174.950
41	41	Casey Mears	Dodge	Chip Ganassi Racing	0.000	0.000
42	5	Terry Labonte (Note: Labonte qualified for the race through the past champion's provisional.)	Chevrolet	Hendrick Motorsports	31.318	172.425
43	49	Ken Schrader	Dodge	BAM Racing	31.076	173.768
Failed to qualify
44	45	Kyle Petty	Dodge	Petty Enterprises	30.896	174.780
45	09	Johnny Sauter	Dodge	Phoenix Racing	31.037	173.986
46	75	Mike Garvey	Dodge	Haefele Racing	31.040	173.969
47	51	Tony Raines	Chevrolet	Competitive Edge Motorsports	31.083	173.728
48	37	Kevin Lepage	Dodge	R&J Racing	31.134	173.444
49	50	Todd Bodine	Dodge	Arnold Motorsports	31.254	172.778
50	11	J. J. Yeley	Chevrolet	Joe Gibbs Racing	31.365	172.166
51	70	Larry Foyt	Dodge	BAM Racing	31.485	171.510
52	98	Randy LaJoie	Ford	Mach 1 Motorsports	31.604	170.864
53	89	Morgan Shepherd	Dodge	Shepherd Racing Ventures	31.705	170.320
54	72	Kirk Shelmerdine	Ford	Kirk Shelmerdine Racing	32.185	167.780
55	80	Carl Long	Ford	Hover Motorsports	32.319	167.084
WD	93	Geoffrey Bodine (Note: Bodine did not run a lap during qualifying, and later withdrew from the race.)	Chevrolet	GIC–Mixon Motorsports	0.000	0.000

== Race recap ==
This race was known as the deciding race of the 2004 Nextel Cup championship and the inaugural Chase for the Nextel Cup, in which five drivers were still mathematically alive for the championship. Points leader Kurt Busch came into the event with an 18-point margin ahead of Jimmie Johnson, who earned the most wins in 2004, while Jeff Gordon, Dale Earnhardt Jr. and veteran Mark Martin were also in contention, with 82 points covering the quintet. At the start of lap 1, Hermie Sadler got turned sideways while Mike Bliss was spun around but Johnson survived the wreck in the following caution. On lap 93, Busch told his crew on the radio that he had a flat right front tire. As Busch came out of the access road off of turn 4 leading to the pits, he lost the right front wheel. As the wheel came off, he almost hit the yellow barrels on the entrance of pit road; the caution came out as the wheel rolled down the front stretch. With 3 laps to go, race leader Ryan Newman made some contact and lost the right side of his tire, causing a caution and subsequent green–white–checkered finish. At the restart, Greg Biffle held off the hard charging Hendrick teams of Johnson and Gordon for the race lead and took the checkered flag to win the race. Having finished in fifth place, Busch won the championship by just eight points over Johnson – the closest championship-winning margin at the time. (Note: This was surpassed by the 2011 NASCAR Sprint Cup Series, where Tony Stewart and Carl Edwards finished tied on points and Stewart won the championship on races won.)

== Race results ==
Fin	St	#	Driver	Make	Team	Sponsor	Laps	Led	Status	Pts	Winnings
1	2	16	Greg Biffle	Ford	Roush Racing	National Guard, Subway	271	117	running	190	$314,850
2	39	48	Jimmie Johnson	Chevrolet	Hendrick Motorsports	Lowe's	271	0	running	170	$231,705
3	5	24	Jeff Gordon	Chevrolet	Hendrick Motorsports	DuPont	271	0	running	165	$208,708
4	8	20	Tony Stewart	Chevrolet	Joe Gibbs Racing	Home Depot	271	34	running	165	$167,003
5	1	97	Kurt Busch	Ford	Roush Racing	Sharpie, Irwin Industrial Tools	271	4	running	160	$130,650
6	17	77	Brendan Gaughan	Dodge	Penske-Jasper Racing	Kodak, Jasper Engines & Transmissions	271	0	running	150	$102,000
7	18	42	Jamie McMurray	Dodge	Chip Ganassi Racing	Texaco, Havoline	271	0	running	146	$88,950
8	10	2	Rusty Wallace	Dodge	Penske-Jasper Racing	Miller Lite	271	26	running	147	$110,983
9	7	21	Ricky Rudd	Ford	Wood Brothers Racing	Motorcraft, U.S. Air Force	271	0	running	138	$90,806
10	9	29	Kevin Harvick	Chevrolet	Richard Childress Racing	GM Goodwrench	271	0	running	134	$99,728
11	11	6	Mark Martin	Ford	Roush Racing	Viagra	271	8	running	135	$67.950
12	6	18	Bobby Labonte	Chevrolet	Joe Gibbs Racing	Interstate Batteries	271	10	running	132	$100,133
13	21	22	Scott Wimmer	Dodge	Bill Davis Racing	Caterpillar	271	0	running	124	$86,175
14	22	99	Carl Edwards	Ford	Roush Racing	Roush Racing	271	0	running	121	$91,867
15	25	10	Scott Riggs	Chevrolet	MBV Motorsports	Valvoline	271	0	running	118	$84,712
16	38	40	Sterling Marlin	Dodge	Chip Ganassi Racing	Lone Star Steakhouse & Saloon, Coors Light	271	0	running	115	$91,925
17	24	15	Michael Waltrip	Chevrolet	Dale Earnhardt, Inc.	NAPA Auto Parts	271	0	running	112	$89,881
18	14	25	Brian Vickers	Chevrolet	Hendrick Motorsports	GMAC Financial Services	271	0	running	109	$65,225
19	30	17	Matt Kenseth	Ford	Roush Racing	DeWalt	271	0	running	106	$104,203
20	23	14	John Andretti	Ford	ppc Racing	VB, APlus at Sunoco	271	0	running	103	$55,150
21	29	32	Bobby Hamilton, Jr.	Chevrolet	PPI Motorsports	Tide	271	0	running	100	$79,500
22	37	00	Kenny Wallace	Chevrolet	Michael Waltrip Racing	Aaron's	271	0	running	97	$52,800
23	16	8	Dale Earnhardt, Jr.	Chevrolet	Dale Earnhardt, Inc.	Budweiser	271	0	running	94	$100,703
24	27	88	Dale Jarrett	Ford	Robert Yates Racing	UPS	270	0	running	91	$86,717
25	43	49	Ken Schrader	Dodge	BAM Racing	Schwan's Home Service	269	0	running	88	$55,500
26	41	41	Casey Mears	Dodge	Chip Ganassi Racing	Target	268	0	running	85	$68,575
27	19	01	Joe Nemechek	Chevrolet	MBV Motorsports	U.S. Army	267	0	running	82	$73,375
28	32	36	Boris Said	Chevrolet	MB2 Motorsports	USG Durock	266	0	transmission	79	$51,575
29	33	31	Robby Gordon	Chevrolet	Richard Childress Racing	Cingular Wireless	266	0	running	76	$86,552
30	3	12	Ryan Newman	Dodge	Penske-Jasper Racing	Alltel	264	72	crash	78	$107,017
31	42	5	Terry Labonte	Chevrolet	Hendrick Motorsports	Kellogg's	264	0	running	70	$81,100
32	35	1	Martin Truex, Jr.	Chevrolet	Dale Earnhardt, Inc.	Enterprise Rent-A-Car	251	0	tire	67	$50,750
33	28	4	Mike Wallace	Chevrolet	Morgan–McClure Motorsports	Lucas Oil	247	0	wheel bearing	64	$54,480
34	15	38	Elliott Sadler	Ford	Robert Yates Racing	M&M's	232	0	running	61	$89,183
35	20	19	Jeremy Mayfield	Dodge	Evernham Motorsports	Dodge Dealers, UAW	231	0	running	58	$69,039
36	40	30	Jeff Burton	Chevrolet	Richard Childress Racing	America Online	231	0	running	55	$57,935
37	31	43	Jeff Green	Dodge	Petty Enterprises	Chex Party Mix	223	0	engine	52	$75,975
38	4	9	Kasey Kahne	Dodge	Evernham Motorsports	Dodge Dealers, UAW	192	0	crash	49	$73,400
39	26	06	Travis Kvapil	Dodge	Penske-Jasper Racing	Mobil 1, Jasper Engines & Transmissions	163	0	crash	46	$49325
40	12	0	Mike Bliss	Chevrolet	Haas CNC Racing	NetZero	145	0	crash	43	$49,100
41	13	23	Shane Hmiel	Dodge	Bill Davis Racing	Bill Davis Racing	115	0	crash	40	$48,910
42	34	13	Greg Sacks	Dodge	Sacks Motorsports	ARC Dehooker, Vita Coco	3	0	overheating	37	$48,605
43	36	02	Hermie Sadler	Chevrolet	SCORE Motorsports	Drive for Diversity, Sam Bass	0	0	crash	34	$48,630
Failed to qualify
44		45	Kyle Petty	Dodge	Petty Enterprises	Georgia-Pacific, Brawny					
45		09	Johnny Sauter	Dodge	Phoenix Racing	Miccosukee Gaming & Resorts					
46		75	Mike Garvey	Dodge	Haefele Racing	Jani-King					
47		51	Tony Raines	Chevrolet	Competitive Edge Motorsports	Consort Hair Care for Men					
48		37	Kevin Lepage	Dodge	R&J Racing	Carter's Royal Dispos-all					
49		50	Todd Bodine	Dodge	Arnold Motorsports	Arnold Development Companies					
50		11	J. J. Yeley	Chevrolet	Joe Gibbs Racing	Vigoro, The Home Depot					
51		70	Larry Foyt	Dodge	BAM Racing	BAM Racing					
52		98	Randy LaJoie	Ford	Mach 1 Motorsports	Mach One Inc.					
53		89	Morgan Shepherd	Dodge	Shepherd Racing Ventures	Racing With Jesus, Red Line Oil					
54		72	Kirk Shelmerdine	Ford	Kirk Shelmerdine Racing	Freddie B's					
55		80	Carl Long	Ford	Hover Motorsports	Adesa Impact					
WD		93	Geoffrey Bodine	Chevrolet	GIC–Mixon Motorsports	Global Industrial Contractors					

== Race statistics ==
- Time of race: 3:50:55
- Average speed: 105.623 miles per hour (169.984 km/h)
- Pole speed: 179.319 miles per hour (288.586 km/h)
- Cautions: 14 for 79 laps
- Margin of victory: 0.342 seconds
- Lead changes: 14
- Percent of race run under caution: 29.2%
- Average green flag run: 12.8 laps
