= NASCAR Cup Series at Homestead–Miami Speedway =

Auto race held at Homestead, United States

Season Finale 400

NASCAR Cup Series
- Venue: Homestead–Miami Speedway
- Location: Homestead, Florida, United States
- First race: 1999
- Distance: 400.5 miles (644.542 km)
- Laps: 267; Stage 1: 80; Stage 2: 85; Final stage: 102
- Previous names: Pennzoil 400 (1999–2000); Pennzoil Freedom 400 (2001); Ford 400 (2002–2011); Ford EcoBoost 400 (2012–2019); Dixie Vodka 400 (2020–2022); 4EVER 400 presented by Mobil 1 (2023); Straight Talk Wireless 400 (2024–2025)
- Most wins (driver): Tony Stewart, Greg Biffle, Denny Hamlin (3)
- Most wins (team): Joe Gibbs Racing (9)
- Most wins (manufacturer): Ford (9)

Circuit information
- Surface: Asphalt
- Length: 1.5 mi (2.4 km)
- Turns: 4

The Season Finale 400 is a NASCAR Cup Series race held at Homestead–Miami Speedway in Homestead, Florida since 1999.

Ryan Blaney is the defending winner of the event.

== History ==
The NASCAR Cup Series Championship logo.

The inaugural race was held in 1999 in mid-November as the second to last race of the Cup series the season behind the NAPA 500 and where it would remain that way as the second to third final race of the season until 2002. In 2002, the race was made the final race in the NASCAR Cup Series season, a position it would hold until 2019, during which it was also the final race of the NASCAR Cup Series playoffs from 2004 to 2019. As the season finale, it was also part of the NASCAR Championship Weekend, which consisted of two other races: the Ford EcoBoost 200 (now the Baptist Health 200) for the NASCAR Craftsman Truck Series and the Ford EcoBoost 300 (now the Hard Rock Bet 300) for the NASCAR O'Reilly Auto Parts Series.

In 2020, the race was moved from November to March after the Folds of Honor QuikTrip 500 at Atlanta Motor Speedway, meaning it no longer served as the championship race. The fall race at Phoenix Raceway, which had been the second-to-last race of the season, became the new championship race for the Cup Series. However, due to the COVID-19 pandemic, the 2020 race ended up being postponed from the original March 15 date to June 14, 2020. In 2021, the race was held in late February as the third race of the season. In 2022, the race was moved again from February to October as the third-to-last race of the season. In 2025, the race was and was later moved to a mid-to-late March date as the sixth race of the season.

Ford ended their title sponsorship of this race and the Xfinity and Truck Series races at Homestead-Miami after they were moved from the last races of the season to March. Dixie Vodka became the title sponsor of the Cup Series race at Homestead-Miami in 2020 and remained for the next two years. In 2023, Mobil 1 became the title sponsor of this race and they decided to name the race in tribute to their driver, Kevin Harvick, as it was his final season as a full-time NASCAR driver. Straight Talk Wireless was announced as the title sponsor from 2024–2025 as part of a new deal with NASCAR.

On May 5, 2025, it was announced that Homestead would become the championship race in 2026, replacing Phoenix. The Straight Talk Wireless sponsorship moved to the spring Phoenix race. The race was named as the Season Finale 400.

=== Specific races ===
- 1999: Rookie Tony Stewart wins the inaugural event, and sets the record for most wins by a rookie in the modern era with his 3rd win, with Dale Jarrett clinching the 1999 Winston Cup Championship.
- 2000: Stewart made it 2-for-2 as he won the race, with his teammate Bobby Labonte clinching the 2000 Winston Cup Championship.
- 2001: Bill Elliott's 41st career win snapped his 226-race winless streak, the longest streak in between race wins, dating back to the 1994 Mountain Dew Southern 500 at Darlington.
- 2002: In the final race on the old configuration, Kurt Busch drove to his 4th win in a rain-delayed event, and Stewart won his 1st title.
- 2003: In the first on a newly reconfigured track, Bobby Labonte's win was marked by a flat tire for leader Bill Elliott on the last lap. In the final race with Winston sponsorship, Labonte took what would become the final win in his Hall of Fame Career.
- 2007: Last race with the fourth-generation car. Matt Kenseth leads 214 of the 267 laps to score the final win before the COT went full-time in 2008, while Johnson goes back to back. It was also the last race Cup series race under Nextel sponsorship.
- 2016: In the last points-paying race in any of NASCAR's national touring series to be run as a single segment, Jimmie Johnson passes Kyle Larson in overtime to win the race, as well as his record-tying seventh (and last) series championship.

== Past winners ==
Year	Date	No.	Driver	Team	Manufacturer	Race distance		Race time	Average speed (mph)	Report	Ref
Year	Date	No.	Driver	Team	Manufacturer	Laps	Miles (km)	Race time	Average speed (mph)	Report	Ref
Second 1.5 mile layout (6 degree corner banking)
1999	November 14	20	Tony Stewart	Joe Gibbs Racing	Pontiac	267	400.5 (644.542)	2:51:14	140.335	Report	
2000	November 12	20	Tony Stewart	Joe Gibbs Racing	Pontiac	267	400.5 (644.542)	3:08:30	127.480	Report	
2001	November 11	9	Bill Elliott	Evernham Motorsports	Dodge	267	400.5 (644.542)	3:24:36	117.449	Report	
2002	November 17	97	Kurt Busch	Roush Racing	Ford	267	400.5 (644.542)	3:26:20	116.462	Report	
Current 1.5 mile layout (18 to 20 degree progressive corner banking)
2003	November 16	18	Bobby Labonte	Joe Gibbs Racing	Chevrolet	267	400.5 (644.542)	3:25:37	116.868	Report	
2004	November 21	16	Greg Biffle	Roush Racing	Ford	271*	406.5 (654.198)	3:50:55	105.623	Report	
2005*	November 20	16	Greg Biffle	Roush Racing	Ford	267	400.5 (644.542)	3:02:50	131.932	Report	
2006	November 19	16	Greg Biffle	Roush Racing	Ford	268*	402 (646.956)	3:12:23	125.375	Report	
2007	November 18	17	Matt Kenseth	Roush Fenway Racing	Ford	267	400.5 (644.542)	3:02:12	131.888	Report	
2008	November 16	99	Carl Edwards	Roush Fenway Racing	Ford	267	400.5 (644.542)	3:05:36	129.472	Report	
2009	November 22	11	Denny Hamlin	Joe Gibbs Racing	Toyota	267	400.5 (644.542)	3:06:18	126.986	Report	
2010	November 21	99	Carl Edwards	Roush Fenway Racing	Ford	267	400.5 (644.542)	3:09:50	126.585	Report	
2011	November 20	14	Tony Stewart	Stewart–Haas Racing	Chevrolet	267	400.5 (644.542)	3:29:00	114.976	Report	
2012	November 18	24	Jeff Gordon	Hendrick Motorsports	Chevrolet	267	400.5 (644.542)	2:48:56	142.245	Report	
2013	November 17	11	Denny Hamlin	Joe Gibbs Racing	Toyota	267	400.5 (644.542)	3:03:52	130.693	Report	
2014	November 16	4	Kevin Harvick	Stewart–Haas Racing	Chevrolet	267	400.5 (644.542)	3:16:31	122.28	Report	
2015	November 22	18	Kyle Busch	Joe Gibbs Racing	Toyota	267	400.5 (644.542)	3:02:23	131.755	Report	
2016	November 20	48	Jimmie Johnson	Hendrick Motorsports	Chevrolet	268*	402 (646.956)	3:07:10	128.869	Report	
2017	November 19	78	Martin Truex Jr.	Furniture Row Racing	Toyota	267	400.5 (644.542)	3:02:11	131.9	Report	
2018*	November 18	22	Joey Logano	Team Penske	Ford	267	400.5 (644.542)	3:00:36	133.056	Report	
2019	November 17	18	Kyle Busch	Joe Gibbs Racing	Toyota	267	400.5 (644.542)	2:48:47	142.654	Report	
2020	June 14*	11	Denny Hamlin	Joe Gibbs Racing	Toyota	267	400.5 (644.542)	3:08:06	127.751	Report	
2021	February 28*	24	William Byron	Hendrick Motorsports	Chevrolet	267	400.5 (644.542)	3:12:45	124.669	Report	
2022	October 23	5	Kyle Larson	Hendrick Motorsports	Chevrolet	267	400.5 (644.542)	3:05:24	129.612	Report	
2023	October 22	20	Christopher Bell	Joe Gibbs Racing	Toyota	267	400.5 (644.542)	3:11:54	125.221	Report	
2024	October 27	45	Tyler Reddick	23XI Racing	Toyota	267	400.5 (644.542)	3:05:44	129.379	Report	
2025	March 23	5	Kyle Larson	Hendrick Motorsports	Chevrolet	267	400.5 (644.542)	3:02:13	131.876	Report	
2026	November 8	12	Ryan Blaney	Team Penske	Ford	267	400.5 (644.542)	3:00:00	133.5	Report	
2027	November 14									Report	

=== Notes ===
- 2004–2019, 2026: Races were held as the NASCAR Cup Series Championship Race.
- 2020: Race postponed from March 22 due to the COVID-19 pandemic.
- 2021: Race moved from February 21 to February 28 after the February 28 race at Auto Club Speedway was cancelled and replaced with Daytona Road Course on February 21.

=== Multiple winners (drivers) ===
# of wins	Driver	Years won
3	Tony Stewart	1999, 2000, 2011
3	Greg Biffle	2004, 2005, 2006
3	Denny Hamlin	2009, 2013, 2020
2	Carl Edwards	2008, 2010
2	Kyle Busch	2015, 2019
2	Kyle Larson	2022, 2025

=== Multiple winners (teams) ===
# of wins	Team	Years won
9	Joe Gibbs Racing	1999, 2000, 2003, 2009, 2013, 2015, 2019, 2020, 2023
7	Roush Fenway Racing	2002, 2004–2008, 2010
5	Hendrick Motorsports	2012, 2016, 2021, 2022, 2025
2	Stewart–Haas Racing	2011, 2014
2	Team Penske	2018, 2026

=== Manufacturer wins ===
# of wins	Manufacturer	Years won
9	Ford	2002, 2004–2008, 2010, 2018, 2026
8	Chevrolet	2003, 2011, 2012, 2014, 2016, 2021, 2022, 2025
8	Toyota	2009, 2013, 2015, 2017, 2019, 2020, 2023, 2024
2	Pontiac	1999, 2000
1	Dodge	2001

Previous race: Xfinity 500	NASCAR Cup Series; Season Finale 400	Next race: Wheatley Vodka Clash (exhibition); Daytona 500 (points)
