= 2014 Ford EcoBoost 400 =

Race details
- Race 36 of 36 in the 2014 NASCAR Sprint Cup Series
- Date: November 16, 2014
- Location: Homestead–Miami Speedway; Homestead, Florida
- Course: Permanent racing facility
- Course length: 1.5 miles (2.4 km)
- Distance: 267 laps, 400.5 mi (644.542 km)
- Weather: Sunny with a temperature of 81 °F (27 °C); wind out of the ESE at 10 miles per hour (16 km/h)
- Average speed: 122.280 mph (196.791 km/h)

Pole position
Driver	Jeff Gordon	Hendrick Motorsports
- Time: 29.876

Most laps led
Driver	Jeff Gordon	Hendrick Motorsports
- Laps: 161

Winner
No. 4	Kevin Harvick	Stewart–Haas Racing

Television in the United States
- Network: ESPN & MRN
- Announcers: Allen Bestwick, Dale Jarrett and Andy Petree (Television); Joe Moore and Jeff Striegle (Booth); Dave Moody (1 & 2) and Mike Bagley (3 & 4) (Turns) (Radio)
- Nielsen ratings: 3.1/7 (Final); 2.9/6 (Overnight); 5.223 Million viewers

The 2014 Ford EcoBoost 400 was a NASCAR Sprint Cup Series stock car race held on November 16, 2014, at Homestead–Miami Speedway in Homestead, Florida. Contested over 267 laps, it was the 36th and final race of the 2014 NASCAR Sprint Cup Series season, and the tenth and final race of the Chase for the Sprint Cup. This race marked the final NASCAR broadcast for ESPN, ending an eight-year stint covering the sport; as well as the final NASCAR broadcast for Allen Bestwick, who had covered the sport since 1986. He would remain with ESPN and ABC calling IndyCar races the following season. Kevin Harvick held off Ryan Newman to score the victory and score his first ever championship. Chevrolet clinched its twelfth consecutive manufacturers championship. Newman was second while Brad Keselowski, Paul Menard, and Jamie McMurray rounded out the top five. The top rookies of the race were Kyle Larson (13th), Justin Allgaier (15th), and Austin Dillon (25th).

== Report ==
The layout of Homestead–Miami Speedway, where the race was held.

=== Background ===
Homestead–Miami Speedway is a motor racing track located in Homestead, Florida. The track, which has several configurations, has promoted several series of racing, including NASCAR, the IRL IndyCar Series, the Grand-Am Rolex Sports Car Series, and the Championship Cup Series. From 2002 to 2019, Homestead–Miami Speedway hosted the final race of the season in all three of NASCAR's series: the Sprint Cup Series, Xfinity Series, and the Camping World Truck Series. Ford Motor Company sponsored all three of the season-ending races, under the names Ford EcoBoost 400, Ford EcoBoost 300, and Ford EcoBoost 200, respectively. The weekend itself was marketed as Ford Championship Weekend. The Xfinity Series (then known as the Nationwide Series) held its season-ending races at Homestead from 1995 until 2020, when it was moved to Phoenix Raceway, along with NASCAR's other two series.

This was the final NASCAR race for driver Marcos Ambrose, who returned to V8 Supercars in his native Australia the following season. It was also the final NASCAR race for crew chief Steve Letarte, who would leave Hendrick Motorsports, where he had worked since he was 16, and move to the broadcast booth for NBC Sports in 2015. After four decades of being a crew chief and winning races in four decades, Jimmy Fennig retired from the sport after the checked flag flew. “Racing is what makes him tick and the competition,’‘ Matt Kenseth said of Fennig. “It’s hard to argue that Jimmy isn’t one of the best crew chiefs in the garage. There’s not many people that have been in the sport as long as he has and remained relevant and competitive as long as he has. I’ll never forget when we won the Daytona 500 in 2012 and he was smiling and said, ‘The last time I was here was 25 years ago with Bobby Allison – that was the last time I won the Daytona 500.’ When you think about that and all the changes that this sport has had with technology and the cars and engineering and all that stuff compared to where we started, it really says something about somebody that's still that competitive today.” “Jimmy somehow finds more time in the day and finds a way to work harder than almost anybody I’ve ever met," Carl Edwards said. "He cares as much or more about winning than anyone I’ve ever been around, so to me Jimmy has been a huge positive influence on me and my driving and he’s a friend.’’

=== Entry list ===
Forty-three drivers were entered for the race.

No.	Driver	Team	Manufacturer
1	Jamie McMurray	Chip Ganassi Racing	Chevrolet
2	Brad Keselowski (PC2)	Team Penske	Ford
3	Austin Dillon (R)	Richard Childress Racing	Chevrolet
4	Kevin Harvick (CC)	Stewart–Haas Racing	Chevrolet
5	Kasey Kahne	Hendrick Motorsports	Chevrolet
7	Michael Annett (R)	Tommy Baldwin Racing	Chevrolet
9	Marcos Ambrose	Richard Petty Motorsports	Ford
10	Danica Patrick	Stewart–Haas Racing	Chevrolet
11	Denny Hamlin (CC)	Joe Gibbs Racing	Toyota
13	Casey Mears	Germain Racing	Chevrolet
14	Tony Stewart (PC3)	Stewart–Haas Racing	Chevrolet
15	Clint Bowyer	Michael Waltrip Racing	Toyota
16	Greg Biffle	Roush Fenway Racing	Ford
17	Ricky Stenhouse Jr.	Roush Fenway Racing	Ford
18	Kyle Busch	Joe Gibbs Racing	Toyota
20	Matt Kenseth (PC5)	Joe Gibbs Racing	Toyota
21	Trevor Bayne (i)	Wood Brothers Racing	Ford
22	Joey Logano (CC)	Team Penske	Ford
23	Alex Bowman (R)	BK Racing	Toyota
24	Jeff Gordon (PC6)	Hendrick Motorsports	Chevrolet
26	Cole Whitt (R)	BK Racing	Toyota
27	Paul Menard	Richard Childress Racing	Chevrolet
31	Ryan Newman (CC)	Richard Childress Racing	Chevrolet
32	Blake Koch (i)	Go FAS Racing	Ford
33	Brian Scott	Richard Childress Racing	Chevrolet
34	David Ragan	Front Row Motorsports	Ford
36	Reed Sorenson	Tommy Baldwin Racing	Chevrolet
38	David Gilliland	Front Row Motorsports	Ford
40	Landon Cassill (i)	Hillman–Circle Sport	Chevrolet
41	Kurt Busch (PC4)	Stewart–Haas Racing	Chevrolet
42	Kyle Larson (R)	Chip Ganassi Racing	Chevrolet
43	Aric Almirola	Richard Petty Motorsports	Ford
47	A. J. Allmendinger	JTG Daugherty Racing	Chevrolet
48	Jimmie Johnson (PC1)	Hendrick Motorsports	Chevrolet
51	Justin Allgaier (R)	HScott Motorsports	Chevrolet
55	Brian Vickers	Michael Waltrip Racing	Toyota
66	Brett Moffitt	Identity Ventures Racing	Toyota
78	Martin Truex Jr.	Furniture Row Racing	Chevrolet
83	J. J. Yeley (i)	BK Racing	Toyota
88	Dale Earnhardt Jr.	Hendrick Motorsports	Chevrolet
95	Michael McDowell	Leavine Family Racing	Ford
98	Josh Wise	Phil Parsons Racing	Chevrolet
99	Carl Edwards	Roush Fenway Racing	Ford
Official entry list

Key	Meaning
(R)	Rookie
(i)	Ineligible for points
(PC#)	Past champions provisional
(CC)	Chase Contender

== Practice and qualifying ==
Brad Keselowski was the fastest in the first practice session with a time of 30.167 and a speed of 179.004 mph (288.079 km/h). Jeff Gordon won the pole with a new track record time of 29.876 and a speed of 180.747 mph (290.884 km/h). “I'm really excited about the pole. I don't know that I've ever been on the pole here and to get the 200th for Hendrick is cool," said Gordon. I think the way we are looking at this weekend is we want to close out the season the absolute best we can. It has been a tremendous season. The No. 24 team has been incredible this year. We are disappointed that we aren't in this thing for the championship, but that's not going to stop us from trying to go out to win the pole and win the race." “This is going to be a race that you are going to go through some changing conditions,” said Kevin Harvick of the 400 miles that wait on Sunday. “Today was really about trying to get a solid starting spot. And we were able to do that with my Budweiser team. Just really proud of my guys. We had a really good day today. Just got to keep doing what we have to do and see where it all falls on Sunday." “A buddy of mine once said it isn't where you start, it is where you stop. We have got half of them beat to start, we'll keep digging with the Caterpillar Chevrolet. We just struggled there a little bit." Ryan Newman said of his qualifying effort. Kevin Harvick was the fastest in the second practice session with a time of 30.845 and a speed of 175.069 mph (281.746 km/h). Brian Scott blew his engine early in the session and started from the rear since this change took place post-qualifying. Ryan Newman had to replace the front splitter after hitting a piece of debris. Jimmie Johnson was the fastest in the final practice session with a time of 30.822 and a speed of 175.200 mph (281.957 km/h).

=== Qualifying ===
Pos	No.	Driver	Team	Manufacturer	R1	R2	R3
1	24	Jeff Gordon	Hendrick Motorsports	Chevrolet	29.894	30.100	29.876
2	41	Kurt Busch	Stewart–Haas Racing	Chevrolet	29.881	29.802	29.895
3	20	Matt Kenseth	Joe Gibbs Racing	Toyota	30.043	30.098	29.951
4	2	Brad Keselowski	Team Penske	Ford	29.795	30.013	30.001
5	4	Kevin Harvick (CC)	Stewart–Haas Racing	Chevrolet	29.832	30.013	30.009
6	15	Clint Bowyer	Michael Waltrip Racing	Toyota	30.096	30.110	30.068
7	18	Kyle Busch	Joe Gibbs Racing	Toyota	30.020	30.105	30.087
8	11	Denny Hamlin (CC)	Joe Gibbs Racing	Toyota	29.989	30.098	30.109
9	22	Joey Logano (CC)	Team Penske	Ford	29.836	30.136	30.124
10	78	Martin Truex Jr.	Furniture Row Racing	Chevrolet	29.964	30.068	30.156
11	88	Dale Earnhardt Jr.	Hendrick Motorsports	Chevrolet	30.204	30.100	30.280
12	48	Jimmie Johnson	Hendrick Motorsports	Chevrolet	30.140	30.006	30.563
13	55	Brian Vickers	Michael Waltrip Racing	Toyota	30.295	30.167	—
14	51	Justin Allgaier (R)	HScott Motorsports	Chevrolet	30.168	30.178	—
15	99	Carl Edwards	Roush Fenway Racing	Ford	30.227	30.201	—
16	27	Paul Menard (Note: Paul Menard started from the rear for unapproved adjustments.)	Richard Childress Racing	Chevrolet	30.257	30.202	—
17	9	Marcos Ambrose (Note: Marcos Ambrose started from the rear for unapproved adjustments.)	Richard Petty Motorsports	Ford	30.260	30.205	—
18	43	Aric Almirola	Richard Petty Motorsports	Ford	30.241	30.235	—
19	1	Jamie McMurray	Chip Ganassi Racing	Chevrolet	30.144	30.235	—
20	16	Greg Biffle	Roush Fenway Racing	Ford	30.163	30.256	—
21	31	Ryan Newman (CC)	Richard Childress Racing	Chevrolet	30.057	30.296	—
22	17	Ricky Stenhouse Jr.	Roush Fenway Racing	Ford	30.162	30.344	—
23	5	Kasey Kahne	Hendrick Motorsports	Chevrolet	30.252	30.375	—
24	3	Austin Dillon (R)	Richard Childress Racing	Chevrolet	30.085	30.392	—
25	47	A. J. Allmendinger	JTG Daugherty Racing	Chevrolet	30.298	—	—
26	21	Trevor Bayne	Wood Brothers Racing	Ford	30.314	—	—
27	42	Kyle Larson (R)	Chip Ganassi Racing	Chevrolet	30.315	—	—
28	14	Tony Stewart	Stewart–Haas Racing	Chevrolet	30.333	—	—
29	13	Casey Mears	Germain Racing	Chevrolet	30.390	—	—
30	33	Brian Scott (Note: Brian Scott started from the rear for changing engines post-qualifying.)	Richard Childress Racing	Chevrolet	30.476	—	—
31	34	David Ragan	Front Row Motorsports	Ford	30.489	—	—
32	10	Danica Patrick	Stewart–Haas Racing	Chevrolet	30.496	—	—
33	40	Landon Cassill	Hillman-Circle Sport LLC	Chevrolet	30.622	—	—
34	83	J. J. Yeley	BK Racing	Toyota	30.629	—	—
35	38	David Gilliland	Front Row Motorsports	Ford	30.672	—	—
36	36	Reed Sorenson	Tommy Baldwin Racing	Chevrolet	30.745	—	—
37	98	Josh Wise	Phil Parsons Racing	Chevrolet	30.760	—	—
38	95	Michael McDowell	Leavine Family Racing	Ford	30.773	—	—
39	7	Michael Annett (R)	Tommy Baldwin Racing	Chevrolet	30.877	—	—
40	32	Blake Koch	Go FAS Racing	Ford	30.882	—	—
41	23	Alex Bowman (R)	BK Racing	Toyota	30.934	—	—
42	26	Cole Whitt (R)	BK Racing	Toyota	31.009	—	—
43	66	Brett Moffitt	Identity Ventures Racing	Toyota	31.069	—	—

== Race ==
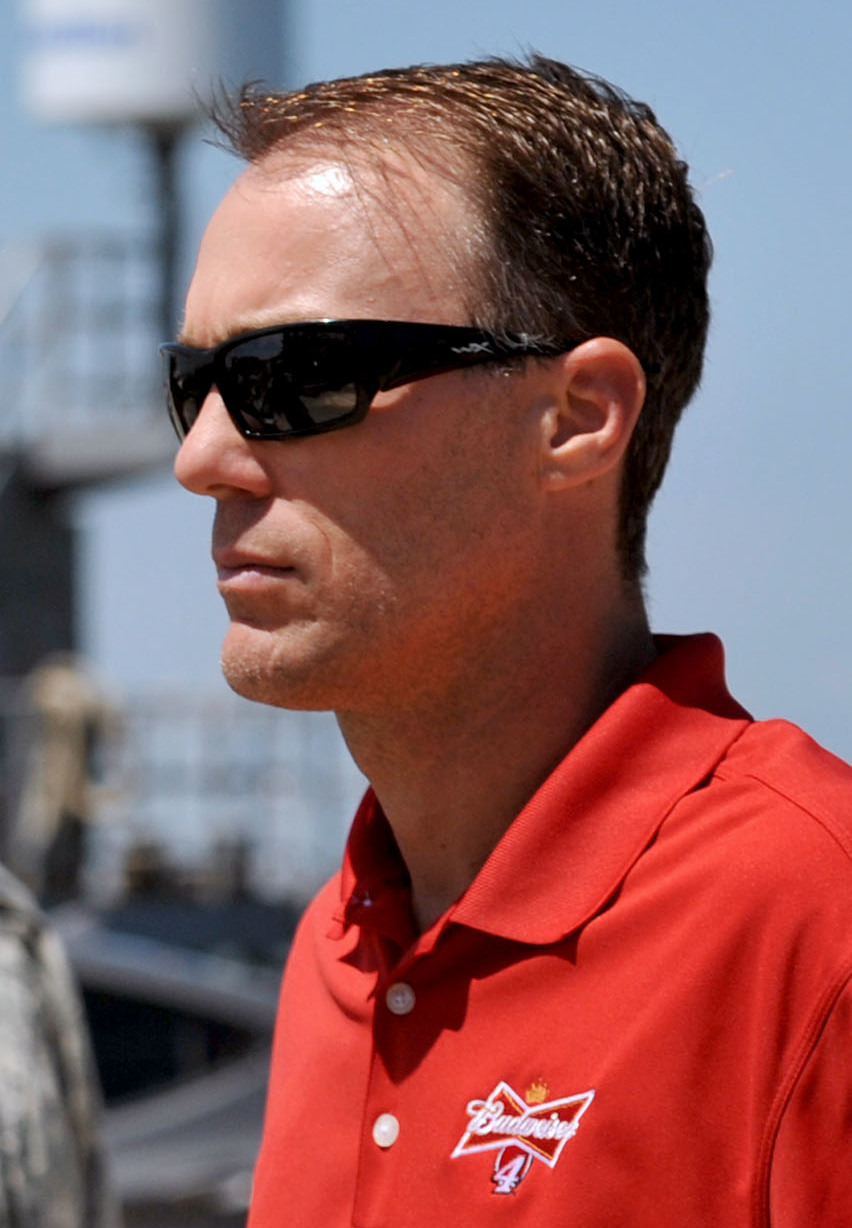
Kevin Harvick won the race and his first Cup Series championship title.

The race was scheduled to begin at 3:17 p.m. Eastern time, but the cars didn't begin rolling off pit road until 3:19 p.m. The race started eight minutes late at 3:25 p.m. with Jeff Gordon leading the field to the green. With 22 entries in the field, Chevrolet clinched their 38th manufacturers championship and twelfth consecutive. "Winning the Manufacturers' championship is one of the goals we set at the beginning of every season," Jim Campbell, U.S. vice president, Performance Vehicles and Motorsports, said. "This championship is the result of great teamwork by the owners, drivers, crew chiefs, crews and technical partners. Special thanks to the Chevrolet powertrain team, along with the engine shops at Hendrick Motorsports and Earnhardt-Childress Racing for delivering the right combination of power, fuel economy, and reliability throughout the entire season. Congratulations to everyone who has made this special achievement possible for Chevrolet." The first caution of the race flew on lap eleven for a cable coming off the catch fence near the start/finish line. Blake Koch stayed out to lead a lap before pitting. Kurt Busch beat Gordon off pit road to assume the lead. The race restarted on lap 15. Kevin Harvick pushed Gordon to the lead and then slingshotted around him to take the lead himself. Jeff Gordon took the lead back on lap 26. The second caution of the race flew on lap 58 after Brett Moffitt had smoke billowing from his car. The race restarted on lap 64 and Denny Hamlin shot to the lead. Gordon took the lead back from Hamlin on lap 66. The third caution of the race flew on lap 86 after Brett Moffitt slammed the wall in turn 2. The race restarted on lap 91. The fourth caution of the race flew on lap 116 after Alex Bowman scraped the wall in turn 2. Kyle Busch was running fifth when he broke the rear-end axle when his car was dropped off the jack. The race restarted on lap 121. Gordon and Harvick swapped the lead back and forth the next three laps until Kevin muscled his way to the lead on lap 124. The fifth caution of the race flew on lap 155 after A. J. Allmendinger slapped the wall in turn 3. Jeff Gordon retook the lead after beating off Denny Hamlin and Kevin Harvick off pit road. The race restarted on lap 161. The sixth caution of the race flew on lap 162 after Greg Biffle slammed the wall in turn 3. The race restarted on lap 166 and Denny Hamlin retook the lead. Tony Stewart, who was running 28th a lap down, took his car to the garage with 82 laps to go. This ended his streak of 15 consecutive seasons of winning at least one race. The seventh caution of the race flew with 74 laps to go when Marcos Ambrose, making his final NASCAR start, slammed the wall in turn 3. The race restarted with 69 laps to go. The eighth caution of the race flew with 61 laps to go after Trevor Bayne, in his final race with the Wood Brothers, blew a tire on the backstretch. The race restarted with 55 laps to go and Denny Hamlin took back the lead. Debris on the backstretch brought out the ninth caution of the race with 47 laps to go. Jeff Gordon beat Hamlin off pit road to retake the lead. The race restarted with 42 laps to go. The tenth caution of the race flew with 32 laps to go after A. J. Allmendinger slammed the wall rear first in turn 1. The race restarted with 25 laps to go. Debris in turn 2 brought out the eleventh caution with 20 laps to go. The race restarted with 15 laps to go and Denny Hamlin took back the lead. With 13 laps to go, J. J. Yeley and Blake Koch wrecked hard in turn 3. That brought out the twelfth caution. The race restarted with nine laps to go. Kevin Harvick took the lead with eight laps to go. Debris in turn 1 brought out the 13th caution of the race with six laps to go. The race restarted with three laps to go and Kevin Harvick took both the victory and the championship. “I was just holding the pedal down and hoping for the best,’’ Harvick said. "This new format has been so stressful. I’m going to go sleep for a week."’ “We didn't have quite enough,” Newman said. “That's disappointing, but like I said, it was an awesome team effort, and I think, again, this is a great racetrack to have a race like this, and I thought there was some amazing passing, and we don't get that at every racetrack.” Jeff Gordon's tenth-place finish moved him past Mark Martin for the second-most top ten finishes in NASCAR history.

=== Post–race ===
During the race, NASCAR ordered Chad Knaus and members of Hendrick Motorsports to report to the NASCAR hauler after the race. Knaus would not face any penalties for putting in a wheel spacer. “It’s really not a big deal,’’ Robin Pemberton said. “We were trying to clarify what went on. I’m not going to get into the weeds on (the rule), but sometimes if you thought you had an issue with a wheel stud or something mechanical like that, you may need to put a spacer on to get some clean threads for the lug nuts. I have no idea (why they wanted it on), that’s not our question. It really is such a minute deal. It’s fine. Everything is good.’’

== Race results ==
Pos	No.	Driver	Team	Manufacturer	Laps	Points
1	4	Kevin Harvick (CC)	Stewart–Haas Racing	Chevrolet	267	43 ^{nb}
2	31	Ryan Newman (CC)	Richard Childress Racing	Chevrolet	267	42 ^{nb}
3	2	Brad Keselowski	Team Penske	Ford	267	41
4	27	Paul Menard	Richard Childress Racing	Chevrolet	267	40
5	1	Jamie McMurray	Chip Ganassi Racing	Chevrolet	267	39
6	20	Matt Kenseth	Joe Gibbs Racing	Toyota	267	38
7	11	Denny Hamlin (CC)	Joe Gibbs Racing	Toyota	267	37 ^{nb}
8	15	Clint Bowyer	Michael Waltrip Racing	Toyota	267	36
9	48	Jimmie Johnson	Hendrick Motorsports	Chevrolet	267	35
10	24	Jeff Gordon	Hendrick Motorsports	Chevrolet	267	36
11	41	Kurt Busch	Stewart–Haas Racing	Chevrolet	267	34
12	5	Kasey Kahne	Hendrick Motorsports	Chevrolet	267	32
13	42	Kyle Larson (R)	Chip Ganassi Racing	Chevrolet	267	31
14	88	Dale Earnhardt Jr.	Hendrick Motorsports	Chevrolet	267	30
15	51	Justin Allgaier (R)	HScott Motorsports	Chevrolet	267	29
16	22	Joey Logano (CC)	Team Penske	Ford	267	28 ^{nb}
17	78	Martin Truex Jr.	Furniture Row Racing	Chevrolet	267	27
18	10	Danica Patrick	Stewart–Haas Racing	Chevrolet	267	26
19	43	Aric Almirola	Richard Petty Motorsports	Ford	267	25
20	13	Casey Mears	Germain Racing	Chevrolet	267	24
21	95	Michael McDowell	Leavine Family Racing	Ford	267	23
22	17	Ricky Stenhouse Jr.	Roush Fenway Racing	Ford	267	22
23	55	Brian Vickers	Michael Waltrip Racing	Toyota	267	21
24	36	Reed Sorenson	Tommy Baldwin Racing	Chevrolet	267	20
25	3	Austin Dillon (R)	Richard Childress Racing	Chevrolet	267	19
26	26	Cole Whitt (R)	BK Racing	Toyota	267	18
27	9	Marcos Ambrose	Richard Petty Motorsports	Ford	267	17
28	33	Brian Scott	Richard Childress Racing	Chevrolet	267	16 ^{op}
29	40	Landon Cassill	Hillman–Circle Sport	Chevrolet	267	15 ^{op}
30	34	David Ragan	Front Row Motorsports	Ford	267	14
31	38	David Gilliland	Front Row Motorsports	Ford	267	13
32	98	Josh Wise	Phil Parsons Racing	Chevrolet	267	12
33	23	Alex Bowman (R)	BK Racing	Toyota	264	11
34	99	Carl Edwards	Roush Fenway Racing	Ford	263	10
35	7	Michael Annett (R)	Tommy Baldwin Racing	Chevrolet	263	9
36	66	Brett Moffitt	Identity Ventures Racing	Toyota	262	8
37	83	J. J. Yeley	BK Racing	Toyota	254	7 ^{op}
38	32	Blake Koch	Go FAS Racing	Ford	254	6 ^{op}
39	18	Kyle Busch	Joe Gibbs Racing	Toyota	246	5
40	47	A. J. Allmendinger	JTG Daugherty Racing	Chevrolet	235	4
41	16	Greg Biffle	Roush Fenway Racing	Ford	220	3
42	21	Trevor Bayne	Wood Brothers Racing	Ford	204	2 ^{op}
43	14	Tony Stewart	Stewart–Haas Racing	Chevrolet	182	1

Notes regarding points (See Championship Points for explanation):
nb - Driver and owner are not eligible for any of the three NASCAR bonus points (three for winning, one for leading a lap, one for leading the most laps) as they are a Championship Four driver and team.
op - Driver did not declare for Sprint Cup Series driver points. Points listed are owner points only, used by NASCAR for bonus money programs and provisional starting positions.

=== Race statistics ===
- 18 lead changes among different drivers
- 13 cautions for 52 laps
- Time of race: 3:16:31
- Kevin Harvick won his fifth race in 2014

=== Final season standings ===
Drivers' Championship standings

	Pos	Driver	Points
3	1	Kevin Harvick	5,043
1	2	Ryan Newman	5,042 (-1)
2	3	Denny Hamlin	5,037 (-6)
2	4	Joey Logano	5,028 (-15)
	5	Brad Keselowski	2,361 (-2,682)
	6	Jeff Gordon	2,348 (-2,695)
	7	Matt Kenseth	2,334 (-2,709)
2	8	Dale Earnhardt Jr.	2,301 (-2,742)
	9	Carl Edwards	2,288 (-2,755)
2	10	Kyle Busch	2,285 (-2,758)
2	11	Jimmie Johnson	2,274 (-2,769)
2	12	Kurt Busch	2,263 (-2,780)
2	13	A. J. Allmendinger	2,260 (-2,783)
2	14	Greg Biffle	2,247 (-2,796)
	15	Kasey Kahne	2,234 (-2,809)
	16	Aric Almirola	2,195 (-2,848)

Manufacturers' Championship standings

Pos	Manufacturer	Points
1	Chevrolet	1,619
2	Ford	1,571 (-48)
3	Toyota	1,444 (-175)

- Note: Only the first sixteen positions are included for the driver standings.

== Note ==
Previous race: 2014 Quicken Loans Race for Heroes 500	Sprint Cup Series; 2014 season	Next race: 2015 Daytona 500
