= 2012 Ford EcoBoost 400 =

Race details
- Race 36 of 36 in the 2012 NASCAR Sprint Cup Series
- Date: November 18, 2012
- Location: Homestead–Miami Speedway, Homestead, Florida
- Course: Permanent racing facility
- Course length: 1.5 miles (2.4 km)
- Distance: 267 laps, 400.5 mi (644.542 km)
- Weather: Clear with the air temperature around 77 °F (25 °C); wind out of the NNW at 8 miles per hour (13 km/h).

Pole position
Driver	Joey Logano	Joe Gibbs Racing
- Time: 30.672

Most laps led
Driver	Kyle Busch	Joe Gibbs Racing
- Laps: 191

Winner
No. 24	Jeff Gordon	Hendrick Motorsports

Television in the United States
- Network: ESPN
- Announcers: Allen Bestwick, Dale Jarrett and Andy Petree

The 2012 Ford EcoBoost 400 was a NASCAR Sprint Cup Series race held on November 18, 2012 at Homestead–Miami Speedway in Homestead, Florida. Contested over 267 laps, it was the thirty-sixth in the 2012 NASCAR Sprint Cup Series, as well as the final race in the ten-race Chase for the Sprint Cup, which ends the season. Jeff Gordon of Hendrick Motorsports won the race, his second win of the season and Hendrick's first win at Homestead, while Clint Bowyer finished second and Ryan Newman finished third. This race was also notable for Brad Keselowski winning his first Sprint Cup Championship.

== Report ==
=== Background ===
Homestead–Miami Speedway is one of ten intermediate tracks to hold NASCAR races. The race was held on the standard track at Homestead; a four-turn oval track that is 1.5 miles (2.4 km) long. The track's turns are banked from 18 to 20 degrees, while the front stretch, the location of the finish line, is banked at three degrees. The back stretch, opposite of the front, also has a three degree banking. The racetrack has seats for 65,000 spectators.

Heading into the final race of the season, Brad Keselowski was leading the Drivers' Championship with 2,371 points while Jimmie Johnson was second with 2,351 points, twenty points behind Keselowski. A maximum of 48 points were available for the final race. Behind Keselowski and Johnson in the Drivers' Championship, Kasey Kahne was third with 2,321 points, three points ahead of Clint Bowyer and twelve ahead of Denny Hamlin in fourth and fifth. Matt Kenseth with 2,297 was four points ahead of Greg Biffle, as Kevin Harvick with 2,285 points, was one point ahead of Tony Stewart and twenty-five ahead of Martin Truex Jr. Jeff Gordon and Dale Earnhardt Jr. was eleventh and twelfth with 2,256 and 2,211 points, respectively.

Chevrolet had already secured the Manufacturers' champions, and entered the race on 240 points, thirty-three points ahead of Toyota with 203 points, with a maximum of nine points available at the Ford EcoBoost 400. Ford was third with 170 points, seventeen ahead of Dodge. Stewart was the race's defending winner, after his victory at the 2011 race.

=== Entry list ===
- (R) denotes rookie driver.
- (i) denotes driver who is ineligible for series driver points.
- (CC) denotes chase contender

No.	Driver	Team	Manufacturer
1	Jamie McMurray	Earnhardt Ganassi Racing	Chevrolet
2	Brad Keselowski (CC)	Penske Racing	Dodge
5	Kasey Kahne (CC)	Hendrick Motorsports	Chevrolet
6	Ricky Stenhouse Jr. (i)	Roush Fenway Racing	Ford
9	Marcos Ambrose	Richard Petty Motorsports	Ford
10	David Reutimann	Tommy Baldwin Racing	Chevrolet
11	Denny Hamlin (CC)	Joe Gibbs Racing	Toyota
13	Casey Mears	Germain Racing	Ford
14	Tony Stewart (CC)	Stewart–Haas Racing	Chevrolet
15	Clint Bowyer (CC)	Michael Waltrip Racing	Toyota
16	Greg Biffle (CC)	Roush Fenway Racing	Ford
17	Matt Kenseth (CC)	Roush Fenway Racing	Ford
18	Kyle Busch	Joe Gibbs Racing	Toyota
19	Mike Bliss (i)	Humphrey Smith Racing	Toyota
20	Joey Logano	Joe Gibbs Racing	Toyota
21	Trevor Bayne (i)	Wood Brothers Racing	Ford
22	Sam Hornish Jr. (i)	Penske Racing	Dodge
23	Scott Riggs	R3 Motorsports	Chevrolet
24	Jeff Gordon (CC)	Hendrick Motorsports	Chevrolet
26	Josh Wise (R)	Front Row Motorsports	Ford
27	Paul Menard	Richard Childress Racing	Chevrolet
29	Kevin Harvick (CC)	Richard Childress Racing	Chevrolet
30	David Stremme	Swan Racing	Toyota
31	Jeff Burton	Richard Childress Racing	Chevrolet
32	Ken Schrader	FAS Lane Racing	Ford
33	Stephen Leicht (R)	Circle Sport	Chevrolet
34	David Ragan	Front Row Motorsports	Ford
36	Dave Blaney	Tommy Baldwin Racing	Chevrolet
37	J. J. Yeley	Max Q Motorsports	Chevrolet
38	David Gilliland	Front Row Motorsports	Ford
39	Ryan Newman	Stewart–Haas Racing	Chevrolet
42	Juan Pablo Montoya	Earnhardt Ganassi Racing	Chevrolet
43	Aric Almirola	Richard Petty Motorsports	Ford
47	Bobby Labonte	JTG Daugherty Racing	Toyota
48	Jimmie Johnson (CC)	Hendrick Motorsports	Chevrolet
51	Regan Smith	Phoenix Racing	Chevrolet
55	Mark Martin	Michael Waltrip Racing	Toyota
56	Martin Truex Jr. (CC)	Michael Waltrip Racing	Toyota
78	Kurt Busch	Furniture Row Racing	Chevrolet
79	Reed Sorenson (i)	Go Green Racing	Ford
83	Landon Cassill	BK Racing	Toyota
87	Joe Nemechek (i)	NEMCO Motorsports	Toyota
88	Dale Earnhardt Jr. (CC)	Hendrick Motorsports	Chevrolet
91	Jason Leffler (i)	Humphrey Smith Racing	Toyota
93	Travis Kvapil	BK Racing	Toyota
98	Michael McDowell	Phil Parsons Racing	Ford
99	Carl Edwards	Roush Fenway Racing	Ford
Official Entry list

== Results ==
=== Qualifying ===
Grid	No.	Driver	Team	Manufacturer	Time	Speed
1	20	Joey Logano*	Joe Gibbs Racing	Toyota	30.672	176.056
2	9	Marcos Ambrose	Richard Petty Motorsports	Ford	30.797	175.342
3	2	Brad Keselowski (CC)	Penske Racing	Dodge	30.841	175.092
4	99	Carl Edwards	Roush Fenway Racing	Ford	30.857	175.001
5	43	Aric Almirola	Richard Petty Motorsports	Ford	30.877	174.887
6	15	Clint Bowyer (CC)	Michael Waltrip Racing	Toyota	30.901	174.752
7	56	Martin Truex Jr. (CC)	Michael Waltrip Racing	Toyota	30.920	174.644
8	18	Kyle Busch	Joe Gibbs Racing	Toyota	30.934	174.565
9	55	Mark Martin	Michael Waltrip Racing	Toyota	30.954	174.452
10	48	Jimmie Johnson (CC)	Hendrick Motorsports	Chevrolet	31.020	174.081
11	17	Matt Kenseth (CC)	Roush Fenway Racing	Ford	31.038	173.980
12	5	Kasey Kahne (CC)	Hendrick Motorsports	Chevrolet	31.040	173.969
13	16	Greg Biffle (CC)*	Roush Fenway Racing	Ford	31.047	173.930
14	1	Jamie McMurray	Earnhardt Ganassi Racing	Chevrolet	31.069	173.807
15	24	Jeff Gordon (CC)	Hendrick Motorsports	Chevrolet	31.081	173.740
16	88	Dale Earnhardt Jr. (CC)	Hendrick Motorsports	Chevrolet	31.129	173.472
17	22	Sam Hornish Jr. (i)	Penske Racing	Dodge	31.194	173.110
18	27	Paul Menard	Richard Childress Racing	Chevrolet	31.200	173.077
19	39	Ryan Newman	Stewart–Haas Racing	Chevrolet	31.216	172.988
20	21	Trevor Bayne (i)	Wood Brothers Racing	Ford	31.275	172.662
21	42	Juan Pablo Montoya	Earnhardt Ganassi Racing	Chevrolet	31.279	172.640
22	30	David Stremme	Swan Racing	Toyota	31.293	172.563
23	29	Kevin Harvick (CC)	Richard Childress Racing	Chevrolet	31.296	172.546
24	51	Regan Smith*	Phoenix Racing	Chevrolet	31.303	172.507
25	98	Michael McDowell	Phil Parsons Racing	Ford	31.909	172.474
26	78	Kurt Busch	Furniture Row Racing	Chevrolet	31.347	172.265
27	6	Ricky Stenhouse Jr. (i)	Roush Fenway Racing	Ford	31.376	172.106
28	13	Casey Mears	Germain Racing	Ford	31.385	172.057
29	19	Mike Bliss	Humphrey Smith Racing	Toyota	31.417	171.881
30	83	Landon Cassill	BK Racing	Toyota	31.440	171.756
31	36	Dave Blaney	Tommy Baldwin Racing	Chevrolet	31.442	171.745
32	47	Bobby Labonte	JTG Daugherty Racing	Toyota	31.454	171.679
33	31	Jeff Burton	Richard Childress Racing	Chevrolet	31.463	171.630
34	34	David Ragan	Front Row Motorsports	Ford	31.472	171.581
35	14	Tony Stewart (CC)	Stewart–Haas Racing	Chevrolet	31.490	171.483
36	26	Josh Wise (R)	Front Row Motorsports	Ford	31.497	171.445
37	10	David Reutimann	Tommy Baldwin Racing	Chevrolet	31.538	171.222
38	93	Travis Kvapil	BK Racing	Toyota	31.610	170.832
39	37	J. J. Yeley	Max Q Motorsports	Chevrolet	31.623	170.762
40	38	David Gilliland	Front Row Motorsports	Ford	31.641	170.664
41	11	Denny Hamlin (CC)* **	Joe Gibbs Racing	Toyota	31.755	170.052
42	32	Ken Schrader*	FAS Lane Racing	Ford	31.863	169.476
43	23	Scott Riggs	R3 Motorsports	Chevrolet	31.636	170.692
Failed to Qualify
	79	Reed Sorenson	Go Green Racing	Ford	31.713	170.277
	33	Stephen Leicht (R)	Circle Sport	Chevrolet	31.754	170.057
	91	Jason Leffler	Humphrey Smith Racing	Toyota	31.758	170.036
	87	Joe Nemechek	NEMCO Motorsports	Toyota	31.838	169.609
Official Starting grid

* - Joey Logano, Greg Biffle, Regan Smith, and Denny Hamlin had to start at the rear of the field because of going to backup cars.

** - Made the field via owners points.

=== Race results ===
Pos	Car	Driver	Team	Manufacturer	Laps Run	Points
1	24	Jeff Gordon (CC)	Hendrick Motorsports	Chevrolet	267	47
2	15	Clint Bowyer (CC)	Michael Waltrip Racing	Toyota	267	42
3	39	Ryan Newman	Stewart–Haas Racing	Chevrolet	267	42
4	18	Kyle Busch*	Joe Gibbs Racing	Toyota	267	42
5	16	Greg Biffle (CC)	Roush Fenway Racing	Ford	267	39
6	56	Martin Truex Jr. (CC)	Michael Waltrip Racing	Toyota	267	39
7	43	Aric Almirola	Richard Petty Motorsports	Ford	267	37
8	29	Kevin Harvick (CC)	Richard Childress Racing	Chevrolet	267	36
9	78	Kurt Busch	Furniture Row Racing	Chevrolet	267	35
10	88	Dale Earnhardt Jr. (CC)	Hendrick Motorsports	Chevrolet	267	34
11	27	Paul Menard	Richard Childress Racing	Chevrolet	267	33
12	99	Carl Edwards	Roush Fenway Racing	Ford	267	32
13	9	Marcos Ambrose	Richard Petty Motorsports	Ford	267	32
14	20	Joey Logano	Joe Gibbs Racing	Toyota	267	30
15	2	Brad Keselowski (CC)	Penske Racing	Dodge	266	29
16	55	Mark Martin	Michael Waltrip Racing	Toyota	266	28
17	14	Tony Stewart (CC)	Stewart–Haas Racing	Chevrolet	266	27
18	17	Matt Kenseth (CC)	Roush Fenway Racing	Ford	266	27
19	31	Jeff Burton	Richard Childress Racing	Chevrolet	266	25
20	1	Jamie McMurray	Earnhardt Ganassi Racing	Chevrolet	266	24
21	5	Kasey Kahne (CC)	Hendrick Motorsports	Chevrolet	266	24
22	22	Sam Hornish Jr. (i)	Penske Racing	Dodge	266	0
23	21	Trevor Bayne	Wood Brothers Racing	Ford	266	0
24	11	Denny Hamlin (CC)	Joe Gibbs Racing	Toyota	266	20
25	47	Bobby Labonte	JTG Daugherty Racing	Toyota	265	19
26	93	Travis Kvapil	BK Racing	Toyota	265	18
27	83	Landon Cassill	BK Racing	Toyota	265	17
28	42	Juan Pablo Montoya	Earnhardt Ganassi Racing	Chevrolet	264	16
29	13	Casey Mears	Germain Racing	Ford	264	15
30	51	Regan Smith	Phoenix Racing	Chevrolet	264	14
31	34	David Ragan	Front Row Motorsports	Ford	263	13
32	36	Dave Blaney	Tommy Baldwin Racing	Chevrolet	263	12
33	38	David Gilliland	Front Row Motorsports	Ford	262	11
34	10	David Reutimann	Tommy Baldwin Racing	Chevrolet	261	10
35	37	J. J. Yeley	Max Q Motorsports	Chevrolet	261	9
36	48	Jimmie Johnson (CC)	Hendrick Motorsports	Chevrolet	224	9
37	32	Ken Schrader	FAS Lane Racing	Ford	219	7
38	30	David Stremme	Swan Racing	Toyota	183	6
39	6	Ricky Stenhouse Jr. (i)	Roush Fenway Racing	Ford	157	0
40	26	Josh Wise (R)	Front Row Racing	Ford	38	4
41	98	Michael McDowell	Phil Parsons Racing	Ford	34	3
42	23	Scott Riggs	R3 Motorsports	Chevrolet	23	2
43	19	Mike Bliss (i)	Humphrey Smith Racing	Toyota	16	0
Official Race results

* - led the most laps

== Standings after the race ==
Drivers' Championship standings

Pos	Driver	Points
1	Brad Keselowski	2400
2	Clint Bowyer	2361
3	Jimmie Johnson	2360
4	Kasey Kahne	2345
5	Greg Biffle	2332

Manufacturers' Championship standings

Pos	Manufacturer	Points
1	Chevrolet	249
2	Toyota	213
3	Ford	174
4	Dodge	156

- Note: Only the first twelve positions are included for the driver standings.

Previous race: 2012 AdvoCare 500	Sprint Cup Series; 2012 season	Next race: 2013 Daytona 500
