= Championship Cup Series =

US motorcycle road racing sanctioning body

The Championship Cup Series (CCS) is an American motorcycle racing sanctioning body. The American Sportbike Racing Association LLC (ASRA) is the parent company of CCS.

Headquartered in Fort Worth, Texas, CCS has been in operation since 1984, founded by Roger Edmondson in Asheville, North Carolina. It is currently owned and operated by Kevin Elliott. CCS is one of the largest club level racing organizations in the U.S., operating more than 60 sanctioned events each year at most of the nation's premier motorsports road-course facilities.

CCS operates as multiple regions throughout the country, divided mostly by geography for both ease of administration and to allow participants to focus on one championship series for the region that is closest to them, which obviates the need for them to travel all over the country in pursuit of a championship. Doing so would make the pursuit of championships biased towards those racers who have the time and finances to travel widely.

CCS also partners with many other organizations to provide track days, practice dates, and additional racing classes (e.g., USGPRU) during their event weekends.

== Participants ==
=== Hobbyists ===
CCS is generally considered a "club racing" or "sportsman" body, connoting that most (but not all) participants race in the series as a hobby, at their own expense, and usually incur a net financial cost rather than profit from their participation, spending thousands of dollars a year out-of-pocket while doing so. Thus, most participants (with notable exceptions) participate in club level events in the pursuit of their hobby rather than in an attempt to create a professional career.

CCS management has stated that it seeks to keep participation affordable and to reduce the influence of financial resources on competitive outcomes. Regardless, all motorsports are equipment expensive and by their very nature they afford an advantage to participants who can afford to purchase better equipment, support, and more opportunities to practice.

=== Entry Level Racing ===
In addition to being a venue for hobbyists to pursue their passion, club racing is seen by many as an entry path to top-level professional series, such as AMA; in fact, the AMA itself allows club racing experience in certain organizations, such as CCS, to count as credit towards obtaining an AMA racing license. While most CCS club racers spend several thousand dollars of their own money each year to pursue their hobby, there are an elite few racers who are actually able to make a living by entering CCS and other club races selectively and, through a combination of talent, dedication, training, practice, and financial investment, are able to consistently win races with purses that are sufficient to offset their expenses and provide them with a living. While club racing is a hobby for most participants, it is a vocation for these elite few racers.

=== International Representation ===
Although CCS is an American organization, there are many international racers in the ranks, including immigrants to the U.S. as well as racers from overseas who participate in club racing activities in the hopes of accumulating enough experience to earn an AMA license as well as sponsorship from a professional racing team that participates in AMA.

== Non-Racer Participation ==
Overall, the number of people at a given CCS event who are not there to race often equals the number of race participants, due to the requirement for a large amount of support staff (for CCS's operations and the participants). There are often also spectators at CCS events.

=== CCS Officials ===
CCS brings a team of professionals and volunteers to help administer each event, including race officials, track marshals, corner workers, administrators, etc. They also receive support from the events' venues, including safety workers, track management, gate attendants, etc. It takes 40-50 people to properly staff a normal event and as many as 70 to work a road course like Road America.

=== Vendors ===
CCS events usually see multiple track-side vendors, including tires from the major race-tire manufacturers' brands, performance parts vendors, technical service providers (suspension experts, engine tuners, equipment maintenance, etc.), track-side photographers, and concessions.

=== Support Staff ===
Many racers bring professional or volunteer support staff with them, including mechanics and "go-fers" to help with everything from mechanical repairs to putting-on/taking-off tire warmers and pit-stands.

=== Fans ===
Although not a major professional series, CCS events attract the friends and families of participants, former or currently injured racers, and local motorsports or motorcycling enthusiasts.

== CCS Aims ==
As published on their website, CCS aims to "... offer a professional racing environment for beginning and seasoned riders alike - all centered around increasing the 'fun factor' in a safety-conscious atmosphere."

=== Safety ===
Because of this stated purpose, CCS takes safety very seriously. All aspects of CCS events are designed and conducted in an attempt to maximize safety, and the official rule book is written accordingly. This includes everything from race start procedures and racing qualification requirements to spectator observation rules and off-track regulations. CCS brings with it an array of professional employees and volunteers to ensure that all events are conducted in strict accordance with their published rules and safety regulations, the venues' regulations, municipal ordinances, generally accepted motorsports safety best practices, and common sense.

=== Fun ===
CCS advertises itself as, "...the leader in Sportsman level motorcycle road racing...," which is likely true given the number of events, classes, and entries that they record each season. CCS aims to meet this goal by helping competition, which they attempt to do by attenuating the financial commitment required to participate, minimizing the correlation between finances and championship potential (in so far as that is possible in motorsports), minimizing the complexities involved with getting started, easing the administrative burden of continued participation, by establishing rules that foster competition, and by mitigating the inherent dangers of the sport as much as is realistic.

== Rules ==
=== Rulebook ===
The CCS Official Rulebook can be found on their website, at http://www.ccsracing.us. Before each season, the CCS Rules Committee makes changes based on the previous year's experience as well as input and change requests from racers and race teams.

=== Classes ===
The CCS classes are SuperSport, SuperBike, SuperTwins, GrandPrix, Thunderbike, Formula 40, and GT. The classes correspond to a variety of different criteria, including general machine type, rider demographics (e.g., age), etc. They also have different rules for the allowable modifications to equipment, such as how much and what types of engine work may be performed, tire types allowed, fuel types, etc. Each class is further broken down by the size of the bike, which is primarily defined by engine size/displacement. For example, within SuperSport there are categories for LightWeight, MiddleWeight, HeavyWeight, and Unlimited, each of which corresponds to a limit in engine size.

The ASRA Pro Series offers a professional level of competition. Classes include: SportBike, SuperBike, SuperStock, ThunderBike.

The Team & Solo Challenge Series is an endurance series. Two or more riders participate on one bike for approximately 200 miles during a 3-4 hour race. Solo competitors race the entire event alone.

The CCS, starting in 2015, sanctions the Daytona 200 motorcycle event.

=== Scoring ===
CCS uses an advanced software package to facilitate scoring and operations. The operations system, RaceWurx, is developed by Bitgeist Corporation out of Miami, FL and the timing system is manufactured by Westhold Corporation of Santa Clara, CA. Racers receive the use of an electronic transponder device when they register for a race. They then affix that transponder to the machine to be raced. When on the track, the transponder works with a hardware beacon and software system that records racers lap times, position, and other data, and feeds it to the race officials software system, which then allows the officials to know in real-time what is happening with the race. Participants benefit as well from the system due to faster posting of results, reduced error rates, and the ability to interface with the system in read-only mode to see current lap times, position, and other data. A racer's performance in an individual event gives that rider points, which are added to the rider's performance history. The aggregate number of points as well as a mathematically derived performance index are used by CCS to determine championship winners in RaceWurx as a given season progresses.

=== Amateur vs. Expert ===
Each class is run in Amateur and Expert classes, which correspond to the riders' previous experience and accomplishments. All riders begin as Amateurs upon receiving their race license for the first time, and after they have raced for sufficient time to gain sufficient experience, and have had a sufficient level of success, they will be promoted to Expert. Promotion from Amateur to Expert is determined by CCS's points system. A rider can easily be identified as being Amateur or Expert not only by his lap times, but also by the background of his bike's number plates, which should be yellow for Amateurs and white for Experts.

=== Regions ===
In order to ease administration and to allow racers to compete for a championship without having to travel nationwide, CCS runs its events in different regions across the country. They also run certain venue-specific championships, as well as a few national series (some of which are under the auspices of the [ASRA] entity). Some of the regions and championships are administered by independent subsidiaries or are sponsored in exchange for promotional rights by an additional organization. Naturally, each regions holds events in the affiliated motorsports facilities that are located in their respective geographies.

The regions include:

- Loudon Road Racing Series (NorthEast Region)
- Mid-Atlantic Region
- CCS South (Texas Region)
- South East Region
- CCS Florida
- TrackAddix Great Plains Region
- Mid West Region
- Road Race South West Region

In addition to there being championship titles for each class in each region, and overall champions for each region, there are slight differences in operations between the regions. For example, some regions have all day practice on the Saturday of a typical two-day event weekend, with all of the races occurring on that Sunday, whereas other regions have some practice and some races on both days of an event weekend. Other differences include variations in registration fees and rules, differences in individual event trophy procedures, and so on; however, all regions generally conform to the CCS Official Rulebook.

Awards are also given for the Blackhawk Farms Raceway Track Championships, and the Summit Point Motorsports Park Track Championships.

=== Equipment ===
Besides having to comply with the various limitations of a particular class, motorcycles must meet other criteria to be allowed to compete in CCS sanctioned events. Requirements include safety modifications (such as safety wiring of crucial fasteners), homologation, proper display of race numbers, and so on. Also counted in the Equipment category is the riders' personal gear, such as leathers, helmets, back protectors, boots, and gloves.

=== Championship Titles ===
Championship Titles can be won for each class within each region. For each class within each region, there is a title for the top Amateur and the top Expert. There is also an Overall Champion title for each region, again for both Amateur and Expert. Class and Overall Champions within regions are determined by CCS's points system. At the beginning of each season, each region holds and awards banquet to recognize the various champions for the previous year.

Although there is no overall CCS champion (across regions), CCS does hold an annual Race of Champions in the Fall (towards the end of the racing season in most regions) at Daytona International Speedway. That in and of itself acts as a sort of proxy overall CCS championship.
