= 1988 NASCAR Busch Grand National North Series =

2nd season of the NASCAR Busch Grand National North Series

Seasons
- ← 1987 1989 →

The 1988 NASCAR Busch Grand National North Series, also known as the Busch North Series, was the 2nd season of the series. The title was won by Jamie Aube, his first in the series.

== Schedule and results ==
The 1988 season included 25 individual races, although Oxford Plains Speedway hosted 7 races and Darlington Raceway, Dover Downs International Speedway, Jennerstown Speedway, and Star Speedway hosted 2 races each. Multiple events were in combination with the NASCAR Busch Series.

Date	Name	Racetrack	Location	Winner
February 13	Goody's 300	Daytona International Speedway	Daytona Beach, Florida	Bobby Allison
March 5	Goodwrench 200	North Carolina Motor Speedway	Rockingham, North Carolina	Mark Martin
March 26	Country Squire Homes 200	Darlington Raceway	Darlington, South Carolina	Geoffrey Bodine
May 7	Pennsylvania 300	Pennsylvania International Raceway	Nazareth, Pennsylvania	Rick Mast
May 15	Busch North 150	Monadnock Speedway	Winchester, New Hampshire	Pete Silva
May 22	Diet Coke 100	Oxford Plains Speedway	Oxford, Maine	Mike Rowe
May 29	Snap-On Tools 100	Oxford Plains Speedway	Oxford, Maine	Mike Rowe
June 4	Budweiser 200	Dover Downs International Speedway	Dover, Delaware	Bobby Hillin Jr.
June 11	Burger King 100	Oxford Plains Speedway	Oxford, Maine	Dale Shaw
June 17	Thomas Chevrolet 100	Jennerstown Speedway	Jennerstown, Pennsylvania	Kelly Moore
June 18	Murry Ford 150	Central PA Speedway	Clearfield, Pennsylvania	Kelly Moore
June 25	Bud 150	Star Speedway	Epping, New Hampshire	Larry Caron
July 2	Busch North 100	Shangri-La Motor Speedway	Owego, New York	Pete Silva
July 10	Oxford 250	Oxford Plains Speedway	Oxford, Maine	Dick McCabe
July 22	B.J. Maurer Ford 150	Jennerstown Speedway	Jennerstown, Pennsylvania	Jamie Aube
July 31	Busch Twin 100's	Thompson Speedway	Thompson, Connecticut	Bobby Dragon
August 6	Kroger 200	Indianapolis Raceway Park	Clermont, Indiana	Morgan Shepherd
August 20	Miller Twin 100's	Oxford Plains Speedway	Oxford, Maine	Robbie Crouch
August 29	Sunoco 150	Riverside Park Speedway	Agawam, Massachusetts	Bobby Dragon
September 3	Gatorade 200	Darlington Raceway	Darlington, South Carolina	Harry Gant
September 10	Commonwealth 200	Richmond International Raceway	Richmond, Virginia	Harry Gant
September 17	Grand National 200	Dover Downs International Speedway	Dover, Delaware	Michael Waltrip
September 25	Rowe Ford 100	Oxford Plains Speedway	Oxford, Maine	Dick McCabe
October 1	Rowe Ford 100	Oxford Plains Speedway	Oxford, Maine	Mike Rowe
October 9	Busch 150	Star Speedway	Epping, New Hampshire	Bobby Dragon

== Full Drivers' Championship ==
(key) Bold – Pole position awarded by time. Italics – Pole position set by owner's points. * – Most laps led.

Note: due to missing information, some finishes marked as not running may not be accurate - their final status is not definitively known.

Pos	Driver	DAY	CAR	DAR	NZH	MND	OXF	OXF	DOV	OXF	JEN	CNB	EPP	TIO	OXF	JEN	TMP	IRP	OXF	RPS	DAR	RCH	DOV	OXF	OXF	EPP	Pts
1	Jamie Aube				11	6	5	3	16	3	11	3	8	14	14	1*	7	20	4	4		11	18	2	4	4	2752
2	Dick McCabe	21				13	4	10		5	2	6	2	3	1	8	**20**	19	7	**7**			33	1*	2	3	2716
3	Dale Shaw	43	19	27	16	**11**	26	2*	33	1*	16	4	3	2	20	3	3	25	5	3	37	18	19	23	3	2	2689
4	Chuck Bown			24	24	3	22	20		15	3	9	6	4	10	9	10		17	2			13	5	11	**5**	2575
5	Kelly Moore		32	36		4	3	**12**	7	30	**1***	**1**	**4**	**17**	**2***	**5**	14	**10**	10	11		31	29	**29**	**14**	17	2569
6	Joe Bessey				38	15	27	22	19	16	6	23	5	13	21	12	12	27	16	16		21	24	17	9	15	2251
7	Stub Fadden					2	13	13		11	5	10	18	8	12	6	23		18	10				11	6	8	2231
8	Jimmy Burns					8	18	14		10	4	13	11	5	25	7	13		20	19				22	23	10	2120
9	Pete Silva				36	1*	8	29		31	21	5	DNQ	1*	33	21	2	34	35	DNQ				16	33	7	2117
10	Larry Caron					19	34	24		38	15	2*	1*	21	5	2	9		12	5				39	35	6	2086
11	Bob Healey					7	32	27		26	8	7	23	7	45	17	8		22	12				28	12	14	1985
12	Joey Kourafas					5	7	11	18	2	18	20	24	23	9		6		36	24				9	8		1918
13	Bobby Gada					10	25	30		34	12	14	12	16	44	13	26		15	13				20	22	DNQ	1866
14	Larry Cates					DNQ	DNQ	32		23	10	19	13	12	DNQ	19	16	36	23	DNQ				13	21	16	1833
15	Bobby Dragon						24			9					4	4	1*		11	1*		22		4	5	1*	1709
16	Bruce Haley					24	36	21		22	26	16	19		27	24	25		8	6				8	10	9	1668
17	Leo Poirier					21	DNQ			DNQ	7	8	15	18	22	14	DNQ			8				31	18	18	1590
18	Jeff Spraker					22	DNQ	DNQ			24	15		22	DNQ	10	19		31	DNQ				37	34	13	1365
19	Gary Pulcifer						DNQ	37		18	22	DNQ	16		DNQ	23	18		37	20				24	28		1325
20	Randy LaJoie					20	23	6		**33**	27		14	DNQ	3		5		3	14							1316
21	Butch Chadbourne					DNQ		DNQ		DNQ			22	10	DNQ		21		25	15				25	32	20	1226
22	Aaron Bennett					12	DNQ	DNQ		21	13	11	17	11		16	DNQ										1214
23	Gregg Lessard					23	30				19	DNQ	10	6	DNQ		17			21						23	1090
24	Brian Weber										17	22	DNQ	20		20	22	31	30	DNQ					29	DNQ	1022
25	Billy Clark					9	**6**	7		32					15									21	37	19	1016
26	Dave Davis		39			16	33	28	36						DNQ		15		29							DNQ	922
27	Dave Bath						DNQ	DNQ		29			9	19	DNQ				19	DNQ							811
28	Gary Caron						DNQ			DNQ			DNQ		DNQ					18				DNQ		11	810
29	Bob Brunell					14	DNQ	DNQ			23	21				18								DNQ			676
30	Robbie Crouch							DNQ					7		18				**1***			35					590
31	David Smith					18	31	DNQ		28			20		DNQ												530
32	Dave Lind				17	DNQ			22						DNQ		24										437
33	Larry Brolsma				26				17					15			DNQ										434
34	J. C. Marsh						21	23		27										DNQ				35	36	DNQ	434
35	Alan Strobridge							DNQ		DNQ			DNQ		DNQ					DNQ							432
36	Mike Maietta														DNQ									26	16	24	430
37	Darren Bernier						DNQ	DNQ		19			21		6												421
38	Ed Ferree										9	12				15											383
39	Lloyd Gillie										14	18	DNQ		DNQ												376
40	Jeff Fuller																11		28	17							348
41	Ed Lavoie																			22				DNQ		DNQ	346
42	Brad Smales										25	17		9													338
43	Dave Bushley																			23				36		21	288
44	Norm Gevais						DNQ	25		DNQ																	285
45	Del Thompson					17	DNQ								DNQ												246
46	Ray Lee							DNQ							DNQ		DNQ										228
47	Tim Brackett																							27	40		194
48	Bill Gratton				37						DNQ			DNQ													180
49	Jimmy Spencer																4										160
50	Jeff Kazmierski														DNQ												143
51	Tim Bender																			9							138
52	Davey Allison															11											130
53	Pete Fiandaca																									12	127
54	Buzzie Bezanson																								17		124
55	Dave Rezendes								14																		121
56	Dale Earnhardt										20																103
57	Dana Patten															22											97
58	Mike Weeden																									22	97
	Mike Rowe						1*	1		37					16				2					3	1*		
	Kenny Robbins						11	15		12					23				33					18	24		
	Leland Kengas						2	5		7					41				14					32	39		
	Ron Moon						12	9		4					30				39					38	13		
	Bobby Babb Jr.						20	18		35					36				13					12	26		
	Dale Verrill						15	8		8					DNQ				6					7	27		
	Bob Gerry						29	26		17					DNQ				24					10	30		
	George Babb						14	34		14									38					6	38		
	Jon Lizotte						35	35		39					34									30	25		
	Albert Hammond						19	17		13					DNQ				9					14			
	Tracy Gordon							31		20					DNQ				32					15	7		
	Jim Field						28	36							DNQ				27					19	19		
	Dave Dion						38	4		6					42												
	Reggie Gammon						10	33		25					DNQ									33			
	Larry Pottle						37	38		36									34								
	Dave Kimball						17			24					DNQ				21								
	Jeff Stevens						9	16							47												
	Jay Currier						16	19							DNQ												
	Richard Tibbets							DNQ							DNQ				26						31		
	George Coolidge																								15		
	Morgan Shepherd														17												
	Sam Sessions																								20		
	Steve Knowlton														26												
	Mike Johnson														32												
	Bruce Kane																							34			
	Bobby Gahan														39												
	Bob Ailes														DNQ												
	Geoffrey Bodine																DNQ										
	Ed Champagne														DNQ												
	Terry Clattenburg														DNQ												
	Roger Godin														DNQ												
	Kevin Heath														DNQ												
	Glen Josselyn														DNQ												
	Roger Laperle														DNQ												
	George Libby														DNQ												
	Jim McCallum																DNQ										
	Barney McRae														DNQ												
	Steve Nelson														DNQ												
	Paul Richardson														DNQ												
	Kenny Wilkenson														DNQ												

== See also ==
- 1988 NASCAR Winston Cup Series
- 1988 NASCAR Busch Series
- 1988 NASCAR Winston West Series
