= 1987 NASCAR Busch Grand National North Series =

1st season of the NASCAR Busch Grand National North Series

Seasons
- ← none 1988 →

The 1987 NASCAR Busch Grand National North Series was the 1st season of the series. The title was won by Joey Kourafas, making him the inaugural champion in what is now the ARCA Menards Series East.

== Schedule and results ==
The 1987 season included 23 individual races, although multiple tracks hosted multiple races, with Oxford Plains Speedway having 6 dates and Darlington Raceway, Seekonk Speedway, and Dover Downs International Speedway having 2 dates each. Multiple events were in combination with the NASCAR Busch Series.

Date	Name	Racetrack	Location	Winner
March 28	Country Squire Homes 200	Darlington Raceway	Darlington, South Carolina	Dale Earnhardt
April 26	Diet Coke 100	Oxford Plains Speedway	Oxford, Maine	Billy Clark
May 3	Busch North 150	Seekonk Speedway	Seekonk, Massachusetts	Chuck Bown
May 25	Miller American 100	Oxford Plains Speedway	Oxford, Maine	Bruce Haley
May 30	Budweiser 200	Dover Downs International Speedway	Dover, Delaware	Mark Martin
June 6	Kroger NASCAR 200	Indianapolis Raceway Park	Clermont, Indiana	Larry Pearson
June 11	Murray's Ford 150	Central PA Speedway	Clearfield, Pennsylvania	Bobby Dragon
June 12	Thomas Chevrolet 150	Jennerstown Speedway	Jennerstown, Pennsylvania	Kelly Moore
June 19	Hancock Lumber 100	Oxford Plains Speedway	Oxford, Maine	Kelly Moore
July 1	Bud 150	Star Speedway	Epping, New Hampshire	Mike Weeden
July 12	Oxford 250	Oxford Plains Speedway	Oxford, Maine	Jamie Aube
July 14	Busch/Stafford 125	Stafford Motor Speedway	Stafford Springs, Connecticut	Tommy Houston
July 18	Delia Pontiac 100	Holland International Speedway	Holland, New York	Dale Shaw
August 1	Busch North 150	Shangri-La Speedway	Owego, New York	Jimmy Spencer
August 15	7-Up 100	Oxford Plains Speedway	Oxford, Maine	Dale Shaw
August 28	Coca-Cola 125	Unity Raceway	Unity, Maine	Ralph Nason
September 5	Gatorade 200	Darlington Raceway	Darlington, South Carolina	Harry Gant
September 13	Busch Empire 100	Spencer Speedway	Williamson, New York	Joey Kourafas
September 19	Grand National 200	Dover Downs International Speedway	Dover, Delaware	Rick Mast
September 26	Busch Seekonk 150	Seekonk Speedway	Seekonk, Massachusetts	Richard Martin
October 10	All-Pro Auto Parts 300	Charlotte Motor Speedway	Concord, North Carolina	Harry Gant
October 12	Big Three Ford Dealers 100	Oxford Plains Speedway	Oxford, Maine	Chuck Bown
October 24	AC-Delco 200	North Carolina Motor Speedway	Rockingham, North Carolina	Morgan Shepherd

== Full Drivers' Championship ==
(key) Bold – Pole position awarded by time. Italics – Pole position set by owner's points. * – Most laps led.
Note: only the final points of the top 25 were recorded. Due to missing information, some finishes marked as not running may not be accurate - their final status is not definitively known.

Pos	Driver	DAR	OXF	SEE	OXF	DOV	IRP	CNB	JEN	OXF	EPP	OXF	STA	HOL	TIO	OXF	UNI	DAR	SPE	DOV	SEE	CLT	OXF	CAR	Pts
1	Joey Kourafas		8	3	12	33		9	3	7	3	3	3	9	3	3	2		**1***	34	5	41	39		2530
2	Chuck Bown		6	1*	15	29		7	12	3	2	42	2	7	7	11	5		4	22	**4**		1*		2525
3	Bobby Dragon	32	7	15	8	9		1*	9	12	7	33	8	5	2	9	11	10	3	13	3	9	6		2459
4	Kelly Moore		20	9	9		18	10	**1***	1*	8	12	5	3	8	21	3		11	7	16		7		2406
5	Billy Clark		**1***		3			4	2	**2**	14	**6***	6	**4***	5	**20**	9		9		7		4		2280
6	Dick McCabe		4	2	27			15	16	16	15	4	10	6	6	4	8		2		11		8		2228
7	Mike Weeden		32	8	24		23	6	4	9	1*	15	14	12	4	5	13		6		25		32	38	2221
8	Dale Shaw				25			3	19	38	11	9	9	1	18	1	4		14		2		24		1998
9	Larry Caron		36	6	30			5	5	28	10	DNQ	7	10	13	39	7		17	36	17		19		1904
10	Bob Healey		35	14	34			14	7	21	13	DNQ	17	11	11	10	16		8		19		27		1857
11	Greg Lessard		10	11	29	18		22	8	37		DNQ	12	17	12	19	10				22				1613
12	Dave Davis		11	18	19		32	11	18	14	19	34	20		22	31	17			35			31		1573
13	Stub Fadden		21	10	6			8	11	10	5	26				29			5				5		1446
14	Ron Moon		9	13	14			20			**22**	DNQ	18		9	18	12		16		15				1344
15	Jimmy Spencer							2	6		18	41	4	2	1*								29		1252
16	Bruce Haley		2	7	1					8		19				6							20		1115
17	Pete Silva		37	**12**	32			**18**	14	34	16	DNQ				23	**15***				24		38		1098
18	Don Kreitz Jr.		22	23	23		10	16	20		20	8													936
19	Bob Johnson							21	15		17			13	16				15				26		930
20	Mike Rowe		24	16						11	4	DNQ	11			16	14								923
21	Lloyd Gillie			17	22			12	17	25		DNQ	15	16		26									876
22	Dana Patten							17	13	20	6	DNQ						32						22	839
23	Ralph Nason			4						35	25						1								641
24	Jeff Stevens		3		**2***					5		38				2							2		581
25	Dave Dion		12		13					6		2				7							15		571
	Jimmy Burns		15		16					4		DNQ				33	6						18		
	Leland Kangas		13		7					17		10				25							33		
	Reggie Gamon		19		11					19		DNQ				28							**11**		
	Jon Lizotte		17		36					23		DNQ				14							10		
	Leo Cleary			22							24	25	22								8				
	George Babb		14		31					32		DNQ				22							35		
	Bob Gerry		21		27					36		DNQ				30							36		
	Joe Bessey									22		DNQ				15					10		13		
	J. C. Marsh		5		10					15		DNQ				32									
	Buzzie Bezanson		18		5							37				8*									
	Albert Hammond		26		17					13		DNQ				12									
	Dale Verrill		30		26							DNQ				13							30		
	Tom Quinney		29		33					18		DNQ											22		
	Darren Bernier		31		28							27				37									
	Bob Glass		28	24	37							DNQ				36									
	Randy LaJoie												13							10			3		
	Norm Gervais							13	10	29															
	Brian Weber			26									16		15										
	Kenny Robbins				20					30		DNQ											16		
	Martin Leblanc									33	12	DNQ				34									
	Art Clark													8					12						
	Brad Smales														14				7						
	Robbie Crouch				4							29													
	Joe Cerullo			20																	14				
	Randy MacDonald											21							20						
	Carroll Ryder		23		18							DNQ													
	Jack Matava										21		21												
	Tracy Gordon									24		DNQ											21		
	Bobby Allison							19								27									
	Mike Johnson											28											23		
	Dave Lebrecque		34							27		DNQ													
	Bobby Babb Jr.									31		31													
	Gale Ellis				38																		34		
	Jamie Aube											1													
	Tommy Houston												1*												
	Richard Martin																				1				
	Bugs Stevens			5																					
	Steven Humphery																				6				
	Bub Bilodeau										9														
	Mike Maietta											DNQ											9		
	Jimmy Rosenfield																				9				
	John Julicher																		10						
	Paul Mauceri														10										
	Tom Akoury																				12				
	Jim Field											DNQ											12		
	Dan Mason																		13						
	John Tripp											DNQ									13				
	George Skora													14											
	Greg Stewart																						14		
	Mike Wrobel													15											
	Rob Moroso		16																						
	Dan Bezanson											DNQ				17									
	Jay Caron														17										
	Ricky Craven											17													
	Mike MacKenzie																						17		
	John Deminck																		18						
	David Smith																18								
	Steven Sprague																				18				
	Rick Wylie													18											
	Dave Bushley																19								
	Roger Godin			19																					
	George Kent Jr.														**19**										
	Tom Richards																		19						
	Reggie Ruggiero											DNQ	**19**												
	John Thurber													19											
	Richard Caparco																				20				
	Eldon King													20											
	Ed Spencer Jr.														20										
	Darryl Bobzin																		21						
	Norm Holden																				21				
	Alan Strobridge												DNQ		21										
	Norm Walden			21																					
	Daniel Solomon																				23				
	Doug Averill											DNQ				24									
	Bobby Gahan											24													
	Bob Brunell		25									DNQ													
	Bruce Kane																						25		
	Dave Lind			25																					
	Howie Lane									26		DNQ													
	Steve Woodcock																						28		
	Gary Bellefleur Jr.		33									DNQ													
	Ryan Karkos				35							DNQ													
	Rusty Wallace															35									
	Harvey Sprague											DNQ											37		
	Larry Pottle															38									
	Craig Hill									39		DNQ													
	Morgan Shepherd											39													
	Yvon Bedard											40													

== See also ==
- 1987 NASCAR Winston Cup Series
- 1987 NASCAR Winston West Series
