= Brian Weber =

American racing driver (born 1966)

- Born: November 12, 1966 (age 59); Long Island, New York, U.S.

NASCAR O'Reilly Auto Parts Series career
- 20 races run over 4 years
- Best finish: 50th (2002)
- First race: 1988 Kroger 200 (Indianapolis)
- Last race: 2003 Goulds Pumps/ITT Industries 200 (Nazareth)
Wins	Top tens	Poles
0	0	0

NASCAR FedEx Freight Truck Series career
- 3 races run over 2 years
- Best finish: 70th (2012)
- First race: 2010 Missouri-Illinois Dodge Dealers Ram Tough 200 (Gateway)
- Last race: 2012 Lucas Oil 150 (Phoenix)
Wins	Top tens	Poles
0	0	0

ARCA Menards Series career
- 2 races run over 1 year
- Best finish: 72nd (2026)
- First race: 2026 JR & CO. 150 (Iowa)
- Last race: 2026 Bush's Best 200 (Bristol)
Wins	Top tens	Poles
0	0	0

ARCA Menards Series East career
- 19 races run over 4 years
- Best finish: 19th (2026)
- First race: 1987 Busch North 150 (Seekonk)
- Last race: 2026 Bush's Best 200 (Bristol)
Wins	Top tens	Poles
0	0	0
- Statistics up to date as of September 26, 2026.

Brian Weber (born November 12, 1966) is an American professional stock car racing driver. He last competed part-time in the ARCA Menards Series East, driving the No. 13 Toyota for Integrity Autosports.

== Racing career ==
Weber made his debut in the then NASCAR Busch Grand National Series in 1988, driving his self-owned No. 04 Buick at Indianapolis Raceway Park, where he would finish 31st with an engine issue.

Weber would not return to the series until 2001, when he once again drove for his own team, this time for Jay Robinson Racing at Watkins Glen International, where he would finish 39th after not starting due to an engine issue. For the following year, Weber would field his own team, driving the No. 84 and 8 Chevrolets, in select events, starting with Bristol Motor Speedway, where he would finish 25th, twelve laps down. He would replicate this finish at Nazareth Speedway later in the year. He would return in 2003, although he only made five starts, with a best finish of 25th at Gateway International Raceway.

After not competing in NASCAR for the next six years, Weber would make his NASCAR Camping World Truck Series debut at New Hampshire Motor Speedway, driving the No. 00 Chevrolet for Daisy Ramirez, where he would finish 34th due to an overheating issue. He would make another start for Ramirez at Phoenix International Raceway, this time in the No. 01 truck, where he would finish eight laps down in 25th. Weber would return in 2012, driving for Mike Harmon Racing in the No. 74 Chevrolet for two events, failing to qualify at Rockingham Speedway, and finishing 26th at Phoenix due to a rear gear failure.

After not competing in NASCAR between 2013 and 2022, Weber announced on March 6, 2023, that he would return to the now NASCAR Xfinity Series, driving the No. 66 Ford for MBM Motorsports at that weekend's event at Phoenix. He was replaced during practice by Timmy Hill, and ultimately failed to make the race. He has indicated that 2023 would be his final year of racing competition.

On March 5, 2026, it was announced that Weber would run the first two races of the ARCA Menards Series East season, driving the No. 13 Toyota for Integrity Autosports.

== Motorsports results ==
=== NASCAR ===
(key) (Bold – Pole position awarded by qualifying time. Italics – Pole position earned by points standings or practice time. * – Most laps led.)

==== Xfinity Series ====
NASCAR Xfinity Series results
Year	Team	No.	Make	1	2	3	4	5	6	7	8	9	10	11	12	13	14	15	16	17	18	19	20	21	22	23	24	25	26	27	28	29	30	31	32	33	34	NXSC	Pts	Ref
1988	Brian Weber	04	Buick	DAY	HCY	CAR	MAR	DAR	BRI	LNG	NZH	SBO	NSV	CLT	DOV	ROU	LAN	LVL	MYB	OXF	SBO	HCY	LNG	IRP; 31	ROU	BRI	DAR	RCH	DOV	MAR	CLT	CAR	MAR					87th	70	
2001	Jay Robinson Racing	49	Ford	DAY	CAR	LVS	ATL	DAR	BRI	TEX	NSH	TAL	CAL	RCH	NHA	NZH	CLT	DOV	KEN	MLW	GLN; 39	CHI	GTY	PPR	IRP	MCH	BRI	DAR	RCH	DOV	KAN	CLT	MEM	PHO	CAR	HOM		137th	46	
2002	Brian Weber Racing	84	Chevy	DAY	CAR	LVS	DAR	BRI; 25	TEX					NHA; 36	NZH; 25	CLT		NSH; 43		MLW; 40	DAY	CHI; 39	GTY; 39	PPR; 33	IRP; 29	MCH	BRI	DAR; 36	RCH	DOV	KAN	CLT; DNQ	MEM	ATL	CAR; 40	PHO	HOM	50th	714	
2002	Brian Weber Racing	8	Chevy							NSH; 31	TAL	CAL	RCH; DNQ				DOV; 41		KEN; DNQ																			50th	714	
2003	Brian Weber Racing	84	Chevy	DAY	CAR; 43	LVS	DAR; 38	BRI; 43	TEX	TAL	NSH	CAL	RCH	GTY; 25	NZH; 27	CLT	DOV; DNQ	NSH; DNQ	KEN	MLW	DAY	CHI	NHA	PPR	IRP	MCH	BRI	DAR	RCH	DOV	KAN	CLT	MEM	ATL	PHO	CAR	HOM	116th	117	
2023	MBM Motorsports	66	Ford	DAY	CAL	LVS	PHO; RP^{†}	ATL	COA	RCH	MAR	TAL	DOV	DAR	CLT	PIR	SON	NSH	CSC	ATL	NHA	POC	ROA	MCH	IRC	GLN	DAY	DAR	KAN	BRI	TEX	ROV	LVS	HOM	MAR	PHO		N/A	0	
^{†} – Replaced by Timmy Hill before qualifying.

==== Camping World Truck Series ====
NASCAR Camping World Truck Series results
Year	Team	No.	Make	1	2	3	4	5	6	7	8	9	10	11	12	13	14	15	16	17	18	19	20	21	22	23	24	25	NCWTC	Pts	Ref
2010	Daisy Ramirez Motorsports	00	Chevy	DAY	ATL	MAR	NSH	KAN	DOV	CLT	TEX	MCH	IOW	GTY	IRP	POC	NSH	DAR	BRI	CHI	KEN	NHA; 34	LVS	MAR	TAL	TEX			121st	0	
2010	Daisy Ramirez Motorsports	01	Chevy																								PHO; 25	HOM	121st	0	
2012	Mike Harmon Racing	74	Chevy	DAY	MAR	CAR; DNQ	KAN	CLT	DOV	TEX	KEN	IOW	CHI	POC	MCH	BRI	ATL	IOW	KEN	LVS	TAL	MAR	TEX	PHO; 26	HOM				70th	18	

=== ARCA Menards Series ===
(key) (Bold – Pole position awarded by qualifying time. Italics – Pole position earned by points standings or practice time. * – Most laps led.)

ARCA Menards Series results
Year	Team	No.	Make	1	2	3	4	5	6	7	8	9	10	11	12	13	14	15	16	17	18	19	20	21	22	23	AMSC	Pts	Ref
2007	Brian Weber & Associates Racing	89	Chevy	DAY; DNQ	USA	NSH	SLM	KAN	WIN	KEN	TOL	IOW	POC	MCH	BLN	KEN	POC	NSH	ISF	MIL	GTW	DSF	CHI	SLM	TAL	TOL	N/A	0	
2026	Integrity Autosports	13	Toyota	DAY	PHO	KAN	TAL	GLN	TOL	MCH	POC	BER	ELK	CHI	LRP	IRP	IOW; 17	ISF	MAD	DSF	SLM	BRI; 19	KAN				72nd	52	

==== ARCA Menards Series East ====
ARCA Menards Series East results
Year	Team	No.	Make	1	2	3	4	5	6	7	8	9	10	11	12	13	14	15	16	17	18	19	20	21	22	23	24	25	AMSEC	Pts	Ref
1987	Brian Weber	84	Buick	DAR	OXF	SEE; 26	OXF	DOV	IRP	CNB	JEN	OXF	EPP	OXF	STA; 16	HOL	TIO; 15	OXF	UNI	DAR	SPE	DOV	SEE	CLT	OXF	CAR			NA	NA	
1988	Brian Weber	84	Buick	DAY	CAR	DAR	NZH	MND	OXF	OXF	DOV	OXF	JEN; 17	CNB; 22	EPP; DNQ	TIO; 20	OXF	JEN; 20	TMP; 22		OXF; 30	RPS; DNQ	DAR	RCH	DOV	OXF	OXF; 29	EPP; DNQ	24th	1022	
1988	Brian Weber	04	Buick																	IRP; 31									24th	1022	
1989	Mike Swaim	84	Buick	DAY	CAR	MAR	OXF	NZH	MND	OXF	DOV	OXF	JEN	EPP	HOL	OXF	JEN	OXF	IRP	TMP; 24	OXF; 33	RPS; 19	OXF; 34	RCH	DOV	EPP			35th	388	
1996	Unknown	84	Pontiac	DAY	LEE	JEN	NZH	HOL	NHA	TIO	BEE	TMP	NZH	NHA	STA	GLN	EPP	RPS	LEE	NHA	NHA	BEE	TMP	LRP; DNQ					NA	0	
2026	Integrity Autosports	13	Toyota	HCY; 20	CAR; 11	NSV	TOL	IRP	FRS	IOW; 17	BRI; 19																		19th	109	

=== SMART Modified Tour ===
SMART Modified Tour results
Year	Car owner	No.	Make	1	2	3	4	5	6	7	8	9	10	11	12	13	14	SMTC	Pts	Ref
2021	N/A	76	N/A	CRW	FLO; 16	SBO; 13	FCS; 10	CRW; 17	DIL; 16	CAR; 11	CRW; 16	DOM; 12	PUL; 20	HCY; 20	ACE			11th	155	
2022	Brian Weber	01	Troyer	FLO; 20	SNM; 23	CRW; 20	SBO; 20	FCS; 15	CRW; 22	NWS; 33	NWS; 24	CAR; 12	DOM	HCY; 16	TRI; 15	PUL; 14		15th	133	
2023	Brian Weber	01	Troyer	FLO; 22	CRW; 23	SBO; 17	HCY; 29	FCS; 20	CRW	ACE; 22	CAR; 16	PUL	TRI; 23	SBO	ROU; 15			20th	182	
2024	Brian Weber	01	Troyer	FLO	CRW	SBO	TRI	ROU	HCY; 23	FCS	CRW	JAC	CAR	CRW	DOM	SBO	NWS	60th	18	
