= Mike Rowe (racing driver) =

American racing driver (born 1950)

- Born: August 19, 1950 (age 76); Turner, Maine, U.S.

NASCAR O'Reilly Auto Parts Series career
- 9 races run over 5 years
- Best finish: 62nd (1991)
- First race: 1986 Oxford 250 (Oxford)
- Last race: 1992 NE Chevy 250 (Loudon)
Wins	Top tens	Poles
0	1	0

ARCA Menards Series East career
- 111 races run over 9 years
- Best finish: 2nd (1990)
- First race: 1987 Diet Coke 100 (Oxford)
- Last race: 2002 Burnham Boilers 200 (Lime Rock)
- First win: 1988 Diet Coke 100 (Oxford)
- Last win: 1991 Busch 150 (Monadnock)
Wins	Top tens	Poles
8	45	0
- Statistics up to date as of June 9, 2026.

Mike Rowe (born August 19, 1950) is an American stock car racing driver from Turner, Maine and has the most wins of any Maine driver in Maine racing history. He currently competes part-time on the Pro All Stars Series Super Late model tour. He is a three-time winner of the Oxford 250.
