= Pro All Stars Series =

Governing body of stock car racing in US and Canada

Pro All Star Series
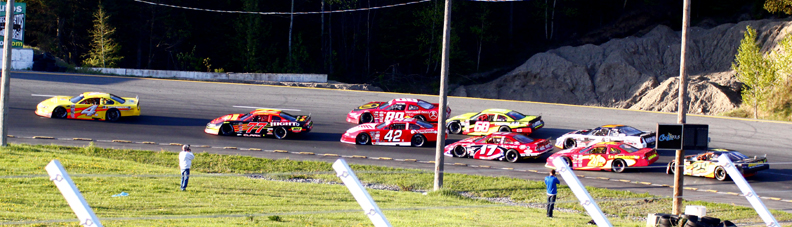
- Category: Stock cars
- Country: Canada; United States
- Inaugural season: 2001
- Drivers' champion: North – D.J. Shaw; National - Derek Griffith; Modifieds - Spencer Morse
- Official website: Pro All Star Series

The Pro All Stars Series is a stock car racing governing body active in the United States of America and Canada. The series started in 2001 and now sanctions various series including North, South, and National Super Late Model tours and a New England Modified tour.

== History ==
The Pro All Stars Series started with the PASS North Pro Stock in 2001. The class was founded by former stockcar racer Tom Mayberry. The series was a successor to the Northeast Pro Stock Association and International Pro Stock Challenge. The first race was held on 20 May 2001 at Lee USA Speedway. Jim McCallum qualified his car on pole position. Dale Shaw beat his 32 rivals that qualified for the race over 150 laps, with 45 total cars attempting. Ben Rowe won six out of ten races in the season. But due to steady top five finishes Sam Sessions was the first series champion. Rowe won the next two titles in the series.

For 2004 a new raceclass was introduced. A 'touring style' modified racing series started at White Mountain Motorsports Park with ten drivers starting the race. PASS regular Ben Rowe won the first race of the series. A further two years later PASS founded the Super Late Model Touring Series South. The series, founded in 2006, was based in North Carolina but also raced on tracks in South Carolina, Virginia and other southern states. This series kept SLM/PLM racing alive through these years in the mid south until it was disbanded in 2018.

Not all ventures of the Pro All Stars Series were highly successful. The PASS Outlaw Late Model series existed for three seasons. The championship was introduced as a breeding ground for new drivers before growing into the Super Late Models. The 2008 season saw very small grids. Nine drivers started the race at Speedway 95, twelve drivers started the race at Riverside Speedway. Mayberry stated that the 2008 financial crisis and the fact that other local tracks added the outlaw late model class contributed to the small field in the PASS Outlaw Late Models. Therefore Mayberry decided to cancel the season after two races. The PASS Late Model Truck Series was also short lived. The trucks were a support category to the PASS South Super Late Models on short tracks throughout North Carolina. With only six drivers at Southern National Raceway Park the PASS organisation decided to cancel the series with one round at Greenville-Pickens Speedway remaining.

In late 2012 Mayberry bought the historic Oxford Plains Speedway. The track changed its focus from American Canadian Tour Late Model sanctioning to the PASS Super Late Model sanctioning. This also affected the showcase race at Oxford Plains, the Oxford 250. As of 2013 the race run under PASS rules and is a point-scoring race for the PASS North and National championships.

New for 2022 is a big block super series (NESS) that is attempting to bring big block super modifieds back to life in the New England region since other series have moved out with dwindling car counts.

== Champions ==
Year	North	South	National	Modified	Northeast LMS	Pro Late Model	Sportsman	Northwest SLM	Outlaw	Trucks
2001	(Maine) Sam Sessions									
2002	(Maine) Ben Rowe									
2003	(Maine) Ben Rowe									
2004	(Maine) Johnny Clark			(Maine) Mark Lucas						
2005	(Maine) Ben Rowe			(Maine) Wayne Allard						
2006	(Maine) Johnny Clark	(Maine) Mike Rowe		(Maine) Chris Staples					(Massachusetts) Derek Ramstrom	
2007	(Maine) Ben Rowe	(Texas) Ryan Lawler		(Maine) Chris Staples			(Maine) Dan McKeage		(Massachusetts) Jimmy Rosenfield	
2008	(Maine) Johnny Clark	(Nevada) Alex Haase	(Maine) Cassius Clark	(Maine) Mark Lucas			(Maine) Ricky Morse		(Maine) Mike Harnish	
2009	(Maine) Johnny Clark	(Maine) Ben Rowe	(Maine) Ben Rowe	(Maine) Scott Grant			(Maine) Carey Martin			(North Carolina) Grand Davidson
2010	(Maine) Johnny Clark	(California) Preston Peltier	(California) Preston Peltier	(New Hampshire) Andy Shaw			(Maine) Dan McKeage			
2011	(Maine) Johnny Clark	(North Carolina) Ryan Blaney	(Maine) Ben Rowe	(New Hampshire) Andy Shaw			(Maine) Carey Martin			
2012	(Maine) Travis Benjamin	(North Carolina) Kyle Grissom	(North Carolina) Jay Fogleman	(New Hampshire) Andy Shaw		(South Carolina) Austin Leitner	(Maine) Carey Martin			
2013	(Maine) Cassius Clark	(North Carolina) Jay Fogleman	(North Carolina) Jay Fogleman	(Maine) Scott Alexander		(North Carolina) Trevor Noles	(Maine) Carey Martin	(Washington (state)) Garrett Evans		
2014	(New Hampshire) D.J. Shaw	(North Carolina) Tyler Church	(Maine) Ben Rowe	(New Hampshire) Andy Shaw	(Maine) Bradley Babb	(North Carolina) Walker Yates	(Maine) Joe Pastore			
2015	(Maine) Mike Rowe	(North Carolina) Tate Fogleman	(Maine) Joey Doiron	(New Hampshire) Andy Shaw		(North Carolina) Kodie Conner				
2016	(New Hampshire) D.J. Shaw	(North Carolina) Matt Craig	(Maine) Ben Rowe	(Maine) Ryan Robbins						
2017	(Maine) Travis Benjamin	(North Carolina) Matt Craig	(Maine) Ben Rowe	(Maine) Ben Tinker						
2018	(New Hampshire) D.J. Shaw	(North Carolina) Matt Craig	(New Hampshire) Derek Griffith	(Maine) Ben Tinker						
2019	(New Hampshire) D.J. Shaw		(Maine) Mike Hopkins	(Maine) Spencer Morse						
2020	(New Hampshire) D.J. Shaw			(Maine) Tyler King						
2021	(Maine) Johnny Clark		(New Hampshire) Derek Griffith	(Maine) Max Cookson						
2022	(Massachusetts) Ryan Kuhn		(New Hampshire) D.J. Shaw	(Maine) Garrett Lamb						
2023	(Maine) Max Cookson		(Maine) Max Cookson	(Maine) Brandon Varney						

== See also ==
- ACT
- ASA
- ASA Midwest Tour
- CARS Tour
- CRA
- CRA Super Series
- SRL Southwest Tour
