= Dave Dion =

American racing driver (born 1943)

- Born: November 30, 1943 (age 82); Hudson, New Hampshire, U.S.

NASCAR Cup Series career
- 12 races run over 5 years
- Best finish: 45th (1980)
- First race: 1978 Mason-Dixon 500 (Dover)
- Last race: 1983 Richmond 400 (Richmond)
Wins	Top tens	Poles
0	1	0

NASCAR O'Reilly Auto Parts Series career
- 9 races run over 7 years
- Best finish: 81st (1991)
- First race: 1986 Oxford 250 (Oxford)
- Last race: 1995 Meridian Advantage 200 (Nazareth)
Wins	Top tens	Poles
0	2	0

ARCA Menards Series East career
- 235 races run over 20 years
- Best finish: 1st (1996)
- First race: 1987 Diet Coke 100 (Oxford)
- Last race: 2006 New Hampshire 125 (Loudon)
- First win: 1992 True Value 250 (Oxford)
- Last win: 2005 Fisher Snow Plows 150 (Oxford)
Wins	Top tens	Poles
13	127	9
- Statistics up to date as of June 9, 2026.

Dave Dion (born November 30, 1943) is an American former professional stock car racing driver who has previously competed in the NASCAR Winston Cup Series, and the NASCAR Busch Series.

Dion has also competed in series such as the NASCAR Busch North Series, where he won the championship in 1996, the ACT Pro Stock Tour, the ACT Late Model Tour, the PASS North Super Late Model Series, and the World Series of Asphalt Stock Car Racing.

== Motorsports career results ==
=== NASCAR ===
(key) (Bold - Pole position awarded by qualifying time. Italics - Pole position earned by points standings or practice time. * – Most laps led.)

==== Winston Cup Series ====
NASCAR Winston Cup Series results
Year	Team	No.	Make	1	2	3	4	5	6	7	8	9	10	11	12	13	14	15	16	17	18	19	20	21	22	23	24	25	26	27	28	29	30	31	NWCC	Pts	Ref
1978	Dave Dion	28	Ford	RSD	DAY	RCH	CAR	ATL	BRI	DAR	NWS	MAR	TAL	DOV; 40	CLT	NSV	RSD	MCH	DAY	NSV															65th	256	
1978	Dave Dion	29	Ford																		POC; 38	TAL	MCH	BRI	DAR	RCH; 26	DOV; 28	MAR	NWS	CLT	CAR	ATL	ONT		65th	256	
1979	Dave Dion	29	Ford	RSD	DAY	CAR	RCH; 19	ATL	NWS	BRI	DAR	MAR	TAL	NSV	DOV	CLT	TWS	RSD	MCH	DAY	NSV	POC	TAL	MCH	BRI	DAR	RCH	DOV							74th	191	
1979	Junior Miller	95	Chevy																										MAR; 26	CLT	NWS	CAR	ATL	ONT	74th	191	
1980	Dave Dion	29	Ford	RSD	DAY	RCH	CAR	ATL	BRI	DAR	NWS	MAR	TAL	NSV	DOV	CLT	TWS	RSD	MCH	DAY	NSV	POC; 17	TAL	MCH	BRI	DAR	RCH; 9	DOV; 14	NWS	MAR; 31	CLT	CAR	ATL	ONT	45th	441	
1981	Dave Dion	29	Ford	RSD	DAY	RCH	CAR	ATL	BRI	NWS	DAR	MAR	TAL	NSV	DOV	CLT	TWS	RSD	MCH	DAY	NSV	POC	TAL	MCH	BRI	DAR	RCH; 28	DOV	MAR	NWS	CLT	CAR	ATL	RSD	94th	79	
1983	Dave Dion	29	Ford	DAY	RCH; 30	CAR	ATL	DAR	NWS; DNQ	MAR	TAL	NSV	DOV	BRI	CLT	RSD	POC	MCH	DAY	NSV	POC	TAL	MCH	BRI	DAR	RCH	DOV	MAR	NWS	CLT	CAR	ATL	RSD		91st	73	

==== Busch Series ====
NASCAR Busch Series results
Year	Team	No.	Make	1	2	3	4	5	6	7	8	9	10	11	12	13	14	15	16	17	18	19	20	21	22	23	24	25	26	27	28	29	30	31	NBSC	Pts	Ref
1986	Dave Dion	29	Ford	DAY	CAR	HCY	MAR	BRI	DAR	SBO	LGY	JFC	DOV	CLT	SBO	HCY	ROU	IRP	SBO	RAL	OXF; 3	SBO	HCY	LGY	ROU	BRI	DAR	RCH	DOV	MAR	ROU	CLT	CAR	MAR	131st	0	
1987	Dave Dion	29	Ford	DAY	HCY	MAR	DAR	BRI	LGY	SBO	CLT	DOV	IRP	ROU	JFC	OXF; 2	SBO	HCY	RAL	LGY	ROU	BRI	JFC	DAR	RCH	DOV	MAR	CLT	CAR	MAR					103rd	0	
1988	Dave Dion	29	Ford	DAY	HCY	CAR	MAR	DAR	BRI	LNG	NZH	SBO	NSV	CLT	DOV	ROU	LAN	LVL	MYB	OXF; 42	SBO	HCY	LNG	IRP	ROU	BRI	DAR	RCH	DOV	MAR	CLT	CAR	MAR		N/A	0	
1990	Dave Dion	29	Ford	DAY	RCH	CAR	MAR	HCY	DAR	BRI	LAN	SBO	NZH	HCY	CLT	DOV	ROU	VOL	MYB	OXF; 41	NHA; 33	SBO	DUB	IRP	ROU	BRI	DAR	RCH	DOV	MAR	CLT	NHA	CAR	MAR	86th	104	
1991	Dave Dion	29	Ford	DAY	RCH	CAR	MAR	VOL	HCY	DAR	BRI	LAN	SBO	NZH	CLT	DOV	ROU	HCY	MYB	GLN	OXF; 25	NHA	SBO	DUB	IRP	ROU	BRI	DAR	RCH	DOV	CLT	NHA; 35	CAR	MAR	81st	146	
1992	Dave Dion	29	Ford	DAY	CAR	RCH	ATL	MAR	DAR	BRI	HCY	LAN	DUB	NZH	CLT	DOV	ROU	MYB	GLN	VOL	NHA	TAL	IRP	ROU	MCH	NHA; 36	BRI	DAR	RCH	DOV	CLT	MAR	CAR	HCY	129th	55	
1995	Dave Dion	29	Ford	DAY	CAR	RCH	ATL	NSV	DAR	BRI	HCY	NHA; DNQ	NZH; 22	CLT	DOV	MYB	GLN	MLW	TAL	SBO	IRP	MCH	BRI	DAR	RCH	DOV	CLT	CAR	HOM						125th	0	
