= Dick McCabe (racing driver) =

American racing driver (born 1947)

- Born: October 6, 1947 (age 79); Kennebunkport, Maine, U.S.
- Achievements: 1992 Busch North Series Champion; 1993 Busch North Series Champion; 1981 Molson Tour Champion; 1982 Molson Tour Champion
- Awards: 1988 Busch North Series Most Popular Driver; New England Auto Racers Hall of Fame (2002)

NASCAR O'Reilly Auto Parts Series career
- 20 races run over 11 years
- Best finish: 58th (1988)
- First race: 1984 Goody's 300 (Daytona)
- Last race: 1994 NE Chevy 250 (Loudon)
- First win: 1988 Oxford 250 (Oxford)
Wins	Top tens	Poles
1	4	0

Dick McCabe (born October 6, 1947) is an American stock car racing driver. Now retired, he is known to most major NASCAR fans as a NASCAR Busch Series winner, but he won the Molson Tour championship twice and the NASCAR Busch North Series championship twice. His nickname was the "Irish Angel." He retired from racing in 1995. He was inducted in the New England Auto Racers Hall of Fame in 2002.

== Accomplishments before major NASCAR ==
McCabe built his first racecar, a 1936 Chevy 6-cylinder "Bomber" coupe at the age of fourteen, and sneaked his way into a number of races. McCabe joined the NASCAR North (a regional racing series) in 1976, where he competed against Stub Fadden, Beaver and Bobby Dragon, and Robbie Crouch. McCabe won the NASCAR North Championship in 1981, then repeated in the folloeing year, when he set the NASCAR North record for the most top-ten finishes in a season. It was also during this period that he became the Oxford Plains Open Champion for four consecutive years from 1981 to 1984.

McCabe also ran a side business during this time as a bait salesman, McCabe would drive his 18-wheel dump truck twelve hours a day to pick up and sell bait to fisherman. His business often appeared on his cars.

McCabe moved Busch North Series, where he again won back to back championships, in 1992 and 1993. The 1993 season was extra special, because McCabe won track and Busch North Championships in the inaugural season at NHIS.

== Busch Series career ==
As he was competing in the North Series, McCabe followed a common trend among most North drivers in running a part-time Busch Series schedule. McCabe made his debut in 1984 at Daytona, where he started 36th but finished 11th.

McCabe returned in 1985, when he ran the No. 80 McCabe Bait Pontiac to a twelfth-place run in his return to Daytona. It was his only start in that year. McCabe made his Busch debut at Oxford Plains Speedway in 1986, earning his first career top-ten start, a ninth, but an early engine failure left him 43rd in the field. He started twelfth in the No. 0, the following year at Oxford Plains, and had a fourth-place finish, his first career top-ten.

McCabe made four starts in 1988. After a twenty-first-place finish at Daytona, McCabe qualified seventh at Oxford, and led 102 laps en route to his first career Busch Series victory. McCabe also added a nineteenth at IRP before finishing 33rd at Dover.

McCabe returned to action for one race in 1989, starting last Richmond, before engine problems sidelined him to 26th. He made two starts the next year, finishing 26th at Oxford and finished 43rd at Loudon after a crash.

Despite a 38th place in his season debut at Oxford, McCabe recovered by piloting his No. 0 in both NHIS races to two top-ten finishes in 1991. He was ninth in the July race and tenth in the October race.

McCabe started off 1992 by qualifying for the outside pole at Nazareth Speedway. However, he was wrecked in that race early and finished 35th. He had a twelfth place finish at Loudon that same year.

McCabe's two races in 1993 included his debut at Watkins Glen International, racing home to a 15th place. However, McCabe only completed eighteen laps at New Hampshire before falling out of the race and to a 44th place finish.

McCabe made his last start in 1994, qualifying 38th and then finished 34th after a mid-race accident.

Sporting positions
Preceded by Ricky Craven	NASCAR Busch North Series champion 1992, 1993	Succeeded by Dale Shaw
Preceded by Beaver Dragon	NASCAR Molson Tour champion 1981, 1982	Succeeded by Robbie Crouch
