= Chuck Bown =

American racing driver (born 1954)

- Born: February 22, 1954 (age 72); Portland, Oregon, U.S.
- Achievements: 1990 NASCAR Busch Series Champion; 1976 NASCAR Winston West Series Champion
- Awards: 1977 NASCAR Winston West Series Most Popular Driver; West Coast Stock Car Hall of Fame (2009)

NASCAR Cup Series career
- 73 races run over 16 years
- Best finish: 38th (1979)
- First race: 1972 Winston Western 500 (Riverside)
- Last race: 1996 Coca-Cola 600 (Charlotte)
Wins	Top tens	Poles
0	4	1

NASCAR O'Reilly Auto Parts Series career
- 187 races run over 11 years
- Best finish: 1st (1990)
- First race: 1986 Goody's 300 (Daytona)
- Last race: 1999 Textilease/Medique 300 (South Boston)
- First win: 1986 Oxford 250 (Oxford)
- Last win: 1993 Advance Auto Parts 500 (Martinsville)
Wins	Top tens	Poles
11	73	11

NASCAR FedEx Freight Truck Series career
- 35 races run over 2 years
- Best finish: 9th (1997)
- First race: 1997 Chevy Trucks Challenge (Orlando)
- Last race: 1998 Sam's Town 250 (Las Vegas)
Wins	Top tens	Poles
0	13	1

ARCA Menards Series East career
- 39 races run over 4 years
- Best finish: 2nd (1987)
- First race: 1987 Diet Coke 100 (Oxford)
- Last race: 1992 True Value 250 (Oxford)
- First win: 1987 Busch North 150 (Seekonk)
- Last win: 1987 Big Three Ford Dealers 100 (Oxford)
Wins	Top tens	Poles
2	24	0

ARCA Menards Series West career
- 109 races run over 9 years
- Best finish: 1st (1976)
- First race: 1970 Race 12 (Medford)
- Last race: 1980 Los Angeles Times 500 (Ontario)
- First win: 1976 Winston Evergreen 150 (Evergreen)
- Last win: 1977 Winston Portland 100 (Portland)
Wins	Top tens	Poles
3	58	7
- Statistics up to date as of August 23, 2026.

Richard Charles Bown Jr. (born February 22, 1954) is an American former race car driver who competed in various levels in NASCAR. He won two NASCAR championships; the 1976 NASCAR Winston West Series championship and the 1990 NASCAR Busch Series championship. His last ride came in 1999. He lives with his wife in Asheboro, North Carolina. He is the older brother of former fellow NASCAR competitor Jim Bown and son of former competitor Dick Bown.

== 1970s ==
Bown made his NASCAR debut in 1972 in the Winston Cup Series. At the age of seventeen, he ran the Winston Western 500 at Riverside International Raceway the No. 27 Plymouth owned by his father Dick. Bown started 22nd but finished 32nd that day after crashing on lap 88. Bown made two more starts in the No. 27 that year, with his best finish being fourteenth at the second Riverside race.

In 1973, Bown returned to the Winston Cup Series driving his father's No. 03 Dodge, finishing in the top-ten for the first time in his career at the Tuborg 400 at Riverside. In 1974, Bown again competed in the three California races on the Winston Cup Series schedule, the two events at Riverside as well as at Ontario Motor Speedway. His best finish was 20th. In 1976, Bown began driving for Gerald Cracker, driving the No. 01 Chevrolet in four races, and the No. 03 at Riverside, where he had his best finish. Bown was named the Most Popular Driver of the Year in the NASCAR Winston West Series in 1977. In 1979, Bown drove Jim Testa's No. 68 Buick and Chevrolet in seven Winston Cup events. He scored a seventh place finish in the Daytona 500 and a sixth place finish in the Firecracker 400. He drove eleven races for the next two years for different owners, but did not reach the top-ten.

== 1986–1993 ==
In 1986, Bown returned to NASCAR, running in the Busch Series. His first start came at the Goody's 300, where he started 28th but finished 40th after wrecking his No. 67 Buick early in the race. He made his only other start of the year at the Oxford 250 at Oxford Plains Speedway, where he's started thirteenth and won his first career Busch race. The following season, Bown ran three races in the No. 7/56 Pontiac, but did not finish a race.

In 1989, Bown ran his first full season in Busch driving the No. 63 Pontiac at Lanier Speedway and at South Boston Speedway. He finished the season with five top-fives and twelve top-tens wound up ninth in the championship standings. The following year, Bown won six races and four poles. He had a total of thirteen top-fives and won the Busch Series championship over Jimmy Hensley by two-hundred points. That same season, he returned to the Cup series, running three races in the No. 97 Pontiac for Tex Powell, his best finish 23rd at the Atlanta Journal 500.

In 1991, Bown won three times and garnered four poles, but dropped fourth in the Busch Series points. He made one Winston Cup start driving Cale Yarborough's No. 66 Pontiac at North Wilkesboro Speedway where he finished 26th. The following season, Bown failed to win a race and had only five top-five finishes, and dropped to eleventh in the standings. In 1993, Bown won his final career pole at Richmond International Raceway and won his final race at Martinsville Speedway. He recorded five top-fives and thirteen top-tens en route to a fourth-place points finish. He made one Winston Cup start driving the Roulo Brothers' No. 39 Chevrolet at Phoenix, finishing 24th.

== Final years ==
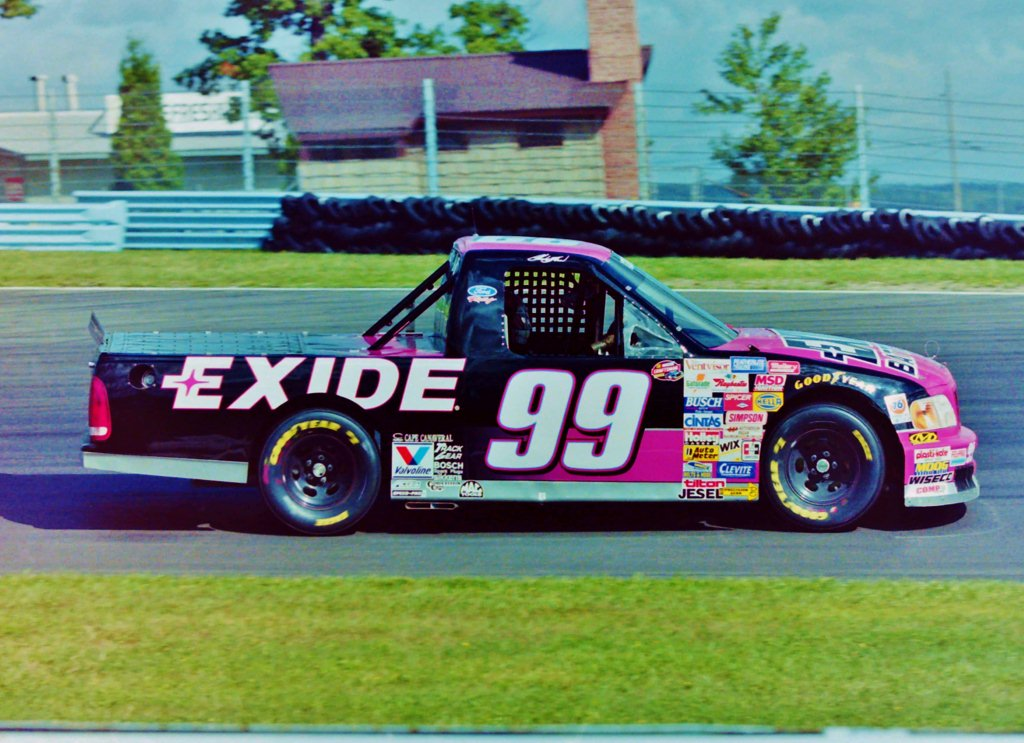
Bown's 1997 truck

In 1994, Bown moved back up to the Cup Series, driving the No. 12 Ford Thunderbird for Bobby Allison. He won the pole for the Food City 500, setting a new track record. He was seriously injured in a wreck at Pocono Raceway which sidelined him for the season.

Bown returned to racing in 1995 in four Busch races, finishing ninth at Charlotte Motor Speedway in the No. 05 Key Motorsports Ford. He competed in nine Cup races in the No. 32 Chevrolet Monte Carlo for Active Motorsports, his best finish a 21st at Charlotte. In 1996, Bown drove for a variety of teams in the Busch Series, his best finish 21st at Darlington Raceway. He drove the Sadler Brothers Racing' No. 95 Ford in three Winston Cup Series events but only finished one race.

In 1997, Bown began racing in the Craftsman Truck Series, driving the No. 99 Ford F-150 for Roush Racing. Despite not winning a race, he had four top-fives and finished ninth in the standings. The next season, Bown qualified on the pole at the season opener at Walt Disney World Speedway, but finished 25th. After that race, he was released from Roush due to downsizing. He moved to the No. 57 CSG Motorsports Ford driving in six events before being released. He ended the season driving the No. 67 Chevrolet Silverado in a pair of races, finishing seventeenth at Phoenix.

In 1999, Bown returned to Hensley to drive their No. 63 Chevrolet. Despite a seventh-place finish at Charlotte, Bown was released from the team halfway into the season, and soon retired.

== Motorsports career results ==
=== NASCAR ===
(key) (Bold – Pole position awarded by qualifying time. Italics – Pole position earned by points standings or practice time. * – Most laps led.)

==== Winston Cup Series ====
NASCAR Winston Cup Series results
Year	Team	No.	Make	1	2	3	4	5	6	7	8	9	10	11	12	13	14	15	16	17	18	19	20	21	22	23	24	25	26	27	28	29	30	31	NWCC	Pts	Ref
1972	Bown Racing	27	Plymouth	RSD; 32	DAY	RCH												RSD; 14	TWS	DAY	BRI	TRN	ATL	TAL	MCH	NSV	DAR	RCH	DOV	MAR	NWS	CLT	CAR	TWS	69th	636.75	
1972	Bown Racing	27W	Plymouth				ONT; 33	CAR	ATL	BRI	DAR	NWS	MAR	TAL	CLT	DOV	MCH																		69th	636.75	
1973	Bown Racing	03	Dodge	RSD; 29	DAY	RCH	CAR	BRI	ATL	NWS	DAR	MAR	TAL	NSV	CLT	DOV	TWS	RSD; 10	MCH	DAY	BRI	ATL	TAL	NSV	DAR	RCH	DOV	NWS	MAR	CLT	CAR				73rd		
1974	Bown Racing	03	Dodge	RSD; 35	DAY	RCH	CAR	BRI	ATL	DAR	NWS	MAR	TAL	NSV	DOV	CLT																			93rd	2.7	
1974	Bown Racing	03W	Dodge														RSD; 20	MCH	DAY	BRI	NSV	ATL	POC	TAL	MCH	DAR	RCH	DOV	NWS	MAR	CLT	CAR			93rd	2.7	
1974	Bown Racing	03W	Plymouth																														ONT; 39		93rd	2.7	
1975	Bown Racing	03W	Dodge	RSD; 27	DAY	RCH	CAR	BRI	ATL	NWS	DAR	MAR	TAL	NSV	DOV	CLT																			57th	319	
1975	Bown Racing	03	Dodge														RSD; 34	MCH	DAY	NSV	POC	TAL	MCH	DAR	DOV	NWS							ONT; 38		57th	319	
1975	Bown Racing	26	Chevy																								MAR; 26	CLT; 12	RCH	CAR	BRI	ATL			57th	319	
1976	Gerald Craker	03	Dodge	RSD; 16	DAY	CAR	RCH	BRI	ATL	NWS	DAR	MAR	TAL	NSV	DOV	CLT																			49th	481	
1976	Gerald Craker	01	Chevy														RSD; 19	MCH	DAY	NSV	POC	TAL	MCH	BRI	DAR	RCH	DOV	MAR; 28	NWS	CLT	CAR	ATL; 31	ONT; 19		49th	481	
1977	Gerald Craker	01	Chevy	RSD; 13	DAY	RCH	CAR	ATL	NWS	DAR	BRI	MAR	TAL	NSV	DOV	CLT	RSD; 25	MCH	DAY	NSV	POC	TAL	MCH	BRI	DAR	RCH	DOV	MAR	NWS	CLT	CAR	ATL	ONT; 39		60th	258	
1978	Johnny Ray	77	Chevy	RSD	DAY	RCH	CAR	ATL; 30	BRI	DAR; 30	NWS	MAR; 24	TAL; 33	DOV	CLT	NSV	RSD	MCH	DAY	NSV	POC	TAL	MCH	BRI	DAR	RCH	DOV	MAR	NWS	CLT	CAR	ATL	ONT		56th	301	
1979	Testa Racing	68	Buick	RSD	DAY; 7	CAR	RCH	ATL; 16	NWS	BRI	DAR	MAR; 23	TAL; DNQ	NSV	DOV	CLT; 40	TWS	RSD	MCH	DAY; 6	NSV	POC	TAL	MCH	BRI	DAR; 17	RCH	DOV	MAR						38th	523	
1979	Testa Racing	68	Chevy																											CLT; 33	NWS	CAR	ATL	ONT	38th	523	
1980		47	Chevy	RSD; 36																															51st	329	
1980	Testa Racing	68	Olds		DAY; 35	RCH	CAR	ATL	BRI	DAR	NWS	MAR	TAL	NSV	DOV	CLT	TWS	RSD																	51st	329	
1980	Halpern Enterprises	02	Olds																MCH; 31	DAY; 37	NSV														51st	329	
1980	Halpern Enterprises	02	Chevy																			POC; 35	TAL	MCH	BRI						CLT; 25	CAR	ATL		51st	329	
1980	RahMoc Enterprises	75	Chevy																							DAR; 11	RCH	DOV	NWS	MAR					51st	329	
1980	Kieper Racing	93	Dodge																															ONT; 27	51st	329	
1981	Ulrich Racing	99	Buick	RSD	DAY	RCH	CAR	ATL	BRI	NWS	DAR	MAR	TAL	NSV	DOV	CLT; 39	TWS	RSD	MCH	DAY	NSV	POC	TAL	MCH	BRI	DAR	RCH	DOV	MAR	NWS	CLT				67th		
1981	Bown Racing	16	Buick																													CAR; 28	ATL; 15	RSD	67th		
1990	Tex Racing	97	Chevy	DAY	RCH	CAR	ATL	DAR	BRI	NWS	MAR	TAL	CLT	DOV	SON	POC	MCH	DAY	POC	TAL	GLN	MCH	BRI	DAR	RCH	DOV	MAR	NWS	CLT; 24	CAR		ATL; 23			50th	276	
1990	Tex Racing	97	Olds																												PHO; 24				50th	276	
1991	Tex Racing	72	Olds	DAY; DNQ	RCH	CAR	ATL; DNQ	DAR	BRI	NWS	MAR	TAL	CLT	DOV	SON	POC	MCH	DAY	POC	TAL	GLN	MCH	BRI	DAR	RCH	DOV	MAR								76th	85	
1991	Cale Yarborough Motorsports	66	Pontiac																									NWS; 26	CLT	CAR	PHO	ATL			76th	85	
1992	Donlavey Racing	90	Ford	DAY	CAR	RCH	ATL	DAR	BRI	NWS	MAR	TAL	CLT	DOV	SON	POC	MCH	DAY	POC	TAL	GLN	MCH; DNQ	BRI	DAR	RCH	DOV	MAR	NWS	CLT	CAR	PHO	ATL			NA	-	
1993	Roulo Brothers Racing	39	Chevy	DAY	CAR	RCH	ATL	DAR	BRI	NWS	MAR	TAL	SON	CLT	DOV	POC	MCH	DAY	NHA	POC	TAL	GLN	MCH	BRI	DAR	RCH	DOV	MAR	NWS	CLT	CAR	PHO; 24	ATL		71st	91	
1994	Bobby Allison Motorsports	12	Ford	DAY; 23	CAR; 25	RCH; 17	ATL; 41	DAR; 12	**BRI**; 23	NWS; 35	MAR; 7	TAL; 27	SON; 21	CLT; 13	DOV; 21	POC; 39	MCH	DAY	NHA	POC	TAL	IND	GLN	MCH	BRI	DAR	RCH	DOV	MAR	NWS	CLT	CAR	PHO	ATL	42nd	1211	
1995	Active Motorsports	32	Chevy	DAY	CAR	RCH	ATL	DAR; 39	BRI; 31	NWS; DNQ	MAR; DNQ	TAL	SON	CLT; 21	DOV; 33	POC; 29	MCH; 24	DAY; 29	NHA; 40	POC	TAL; 37	IND	GLN	MCH	BRI	DAR	RCH	DOV	MAR	NWS	CLT	CAR	PHO	ATL	43rd	618	
1996	Sadler Brothers Racing	95	Ford	DAY; DNQ	CAR	RCH	ATL; 40	DAR; DNQ	BRI; DNQ	NWS	MAR	TAL; 25	SON	CLT; 42	DOV	POC	MCH	DAY	NHA	POC	TAL	IND	GLN	MCH	BRI	DAR	RCH	DOV	MAR	NWS	CLT	CAR	PHO	ATL	53rd	168	

===== Daytona 500 results =====
Year	Team	Manufacturer	Start	Finish
1979	Testa Racing	Buick	28	7
1980	Testa Racing	Oldsmobile	15	35
1991	Tex Racing	Chevrolet	DNQ	
1994	Bobby Allison Motorsports	Ford	37	23
1996	Sadler Brothers Racing	Ford	DNQ	

==== Busch Series ====
NASCAR Busch Series results
Year	Team	No.	Make	1	2	3	4	5	6	7	8	9	10	11	12	13	14	15	16	17	18	19	20	21	22	23	24	25	26	27	28	29	30	31	32	NBGNC	Pts	Ref
1986	Quint Boisvert	67	Buick	DAY; 40	CAR	HCY	MAR	BRI	DAR	SBO	LGY	JFC	DOV	CLT	SBO	HCY	ROU	IRP	SBO	RAL																95th	43	
1986	Quint Boisvert	67	Pontiac																		OXF; 1*	SBO	HCY	LGY	ROU	BRI	DAR	RCH	DOV	MAR	ROU	CLT	CAR	MAR		95th	43	
1987	Quint Boisvert	56	Pontiac	DAY	HCY	MAR	DAR	BRI	LGY	SBO	CLT	DOV; 29	IRP	ROU	JFC											DOV; 22	MAR	CLT	CAR	MAR						77th		
1987	Quint Boisvert	7	Pontiac													OXF; 42	SBO	HCY	RAL	LGY	ROU	BRI	JFC	DAR	RCH											77th		
1988	Quint Boisvert	56	Pontiac	DAY	HCY	CAR	MAR	DAR; 24	BRI	LNG																										52nd	306	
1988	Quint Boisvert	7	Pontiac								NZH; 24	SBO	NSV	CLT	DOV	ROU	LAN	LVL	MYB	OXF; 10	SBO	HCY	LNG	IRP	ROU	BRI	DAR	RCH								52nd	306	
1988	Quint Boisvert	1	Pontiac																										DOV; 13	MAR	CLT	CAR	MAR			52nd	306	
1989	HVP Motorsports	63	Pontiac	DAY; 32	CAR; 23	MAR; 8	HCY; 19	DAR; 18	BRI; 13	NZH; 23	SBO; 8	**LAN**; 20	NSV; 8	CLT; 23	DOV; 6	ROU; 26	LVL; 5*	VOL; 3	MYB; 28	**SBO**; 3*	HCY; 29	DUB; 2*	IRP; 8*	ROU; 15	BRI; 23	DAR; 36	RCH; 34	DOV; 6	MAR; 8	CLT; 22	CAR; 30	MAR; 5				9th	3349	
1990	HVP Motorsports	63	Pontiac	DAY; 21	RCH; 6	CAR; 12	MAR; 10	**HCY**; 3	DAR; 13	BRI; 10	**LAN**; 1*	SBO; 1	NZH; 3	**HCY**; 1*	CLT; 17	DOV; 8	ROU; 1*	**VOL**; 5	MYB; 9	OXF; 1*	NHA; 3	SBO; 2*	DUB; 2	IRP; 4	ROU; 1*	BRI; 17	DAR; 13	RCH; 21	DOV; 12	MAR; 17	CLT; 13	NHA; 24	CAR; 18	MAR; 27		1st	4372	
1991	HVP Motorsports	63	Pontiac	DAY; 33	RCH; 12	CAR; 36	MAR; 7	**VOL**; 10	HCY; 17	DAR; 11	BRI; 10	LAN; 5	SBO; 12	NZH; 1*	CLT; 25	DOV; 19	ROU; 25	**HCY**; 11	**MYB**; 1*	GLN; 7	OXF; 12	NHA; 2	SBO; 16	DUB; 1*	IRP; 4*	ROU; 5	**BRI**; 8	DAR; 17	RCH; 29	DOV; 17	CLT; 23	NHA; 2	CAR; 42	MAR; 2		4th	3922	
1992	HVP Motorsports	63	Pontiac	DAY; 32	CAR; 35	RCH; 9	ATL; 41	MAR; 3	DAR; 27	BRI; 12	HCY; 3	LAN; 2	DUB; 18	NZH; 4	CLT; 38	DOV; 23	ROU; 19	MYB; 9	GLN; 7	VOL; 8	NHA; 24	TAL; 12	IRP; 24	ROU; 27	MCH; 15	NHA; 22	BRI; 2	DAR; 28	RCH; 14	DOV; 10		MAR; 24		HCY; 7		11th	3580	
1992	HVP Motorsports	63	Chevy																												CLT; 12		CAR; 6			11th	3580	
1993	HVP Motorsports	63	Pontiac	DAY; 13	CAR; 10	RCH; 18	DAR; 12	BRI; 25	HCY; 8	ROU; 6	MAR; 5	NZH; 6		DOV; 16	MYB; 12	GLN; 6	MLW; 17	TAL; 26	IRP; 22		NHA; 27	BRI; 5		**RCH**; 14	DOV; 23	ROU; 3*		MAR; 1		HCY; 2						4th	3532	
1993	HVP Motorsports	63	Chevy										CLT; 8							MCH; 10			DAR; 20				CLT; 8		CAR; 13		ATL; 36					4th	3532	
1995	Key Motorsports	05	Ford	DAY	CAR	RCH	ATL	NSV	DAR	BRI	HCY	NHA	NZH	CLT	DOV	MYB	GLN	MLW	TAL	SBO	IRP	MCH	BRI	DAR	RCH; 38	DOV	CLT; 9	CAR; 30								59th	306	
1995	Group III Racing	18	Ford																										HOM; 39							59th	306	
1996	Day Enterprise Racing	16	Pontiac	DAY; 28	CAR																															51st	629	
1996	Key Motorsports	05	Ford			RCH; 31																														51st	629	
1996	Bobby Jones Racing	50	Ford				ATL; DNQ	NSV; 27	DAR; 21	BRI; 37	HCY; 23	NZH	CLT																							51st	629	
1996	Bown Racing	51	Chevy											DOV; 26	SBO	MYB	GLN	MLW	NHA	TAL	IRP; 32	MCH	BRI	DAR	RCH	DOV	CLT	CAR	HOM							51st	629	
1998	Bown Racing	51	Chevy	DAY	CAR	LVS	NSV	DAR	BRI	TEX	HCY	TAL	NHA	NZH	CLT	DOV	RCH	PPR	GLN	MLW	MYB	CAL	SBO	IRP	MCH	BRI	DAR	RCH	DOV	CLT	GTY	CAR; DNQ	ATL			NA	-	
1998	Martin Motorsports	92	Chevy																															HOM; DNQ		NA	-	
1999	HVP Motorsports	63	Chevy	DAY; 11	CAR; 24	LVS; 25	ATL; 40	DAR; 17	TEX; 23	NSV; 40	BRI; 31	TAL; 25	CAL; 35	NHA; 18	RCH; 29	NZH; 31	CLT; 7	DOV; 41	SBO; 22	GLN	MLW	MYB	PPR	GTY	IRP	MCH	BRI	DAR	RCH	DOV	CLT	CAR	MEM	PHO	HOM	38th	1370	

==== Craftsman Truck Series ====
NASCAR Craftsman Truck Series results
Year	Team	No.	Make	1	2	3	4	5	6	7	8	9	10	11	12	13	14	15	16	17	18	19	20	21	22	23	24	25	26	27	NCTC	Pts	Ref
1997	Roush Racing	99	Ford	WDW; 12	TUS; 9	HOM; 3	PHO; 8	POR; 27	EVG; 14	I70; 3	NHA; 10	TEX; 4	BRI; 9	NZH; 7	MLW; 10	LVL; 22	CNS; 26	HPT; 20	IRP; 12	FLM; 12	NSV; 7	GLN; 34	RCH; 8	MAR; 16	SON; 14	MMR; 14	CAL; 16	PHO; 2	LVS; 9		9th	3320	
1998	Roush Racing	99	Ford	**WDW**; 25*																											33rd	927	
1998	CSG Motorsports	57	Ford		HOM; 12	PHO; 23	POR; 15	EVG; 20	I70; 22	GLN; 16	TEX	BRI	MLW	NZH	CAL	PPR	IRP	NHA	FLM	NSV	HPT	LVL	RCH	MEM	GTY	MAR	SON	MMR			33rd	927	
1998	Don VanDenBos	67	Chevy																										PHO; 17	LVS; 30	33rd	927	

== Awards ==
Bown was inducted in the West Coast Stock Car Hall of Fame in 2009 along with Wayne Spears, Doug George, and Rick Carelli.

Sporting positions
Preceded by Rob Moroso	NASCAR Busch Series Champion; 1990	Succeeded by Bobby Labonte
Preceded by Ray Elder	NASCAR Winston West Series Champion; 1976	Succeeded by Bill Schmitt
