= Ricky Craven =

American stock car racing driver and commentator

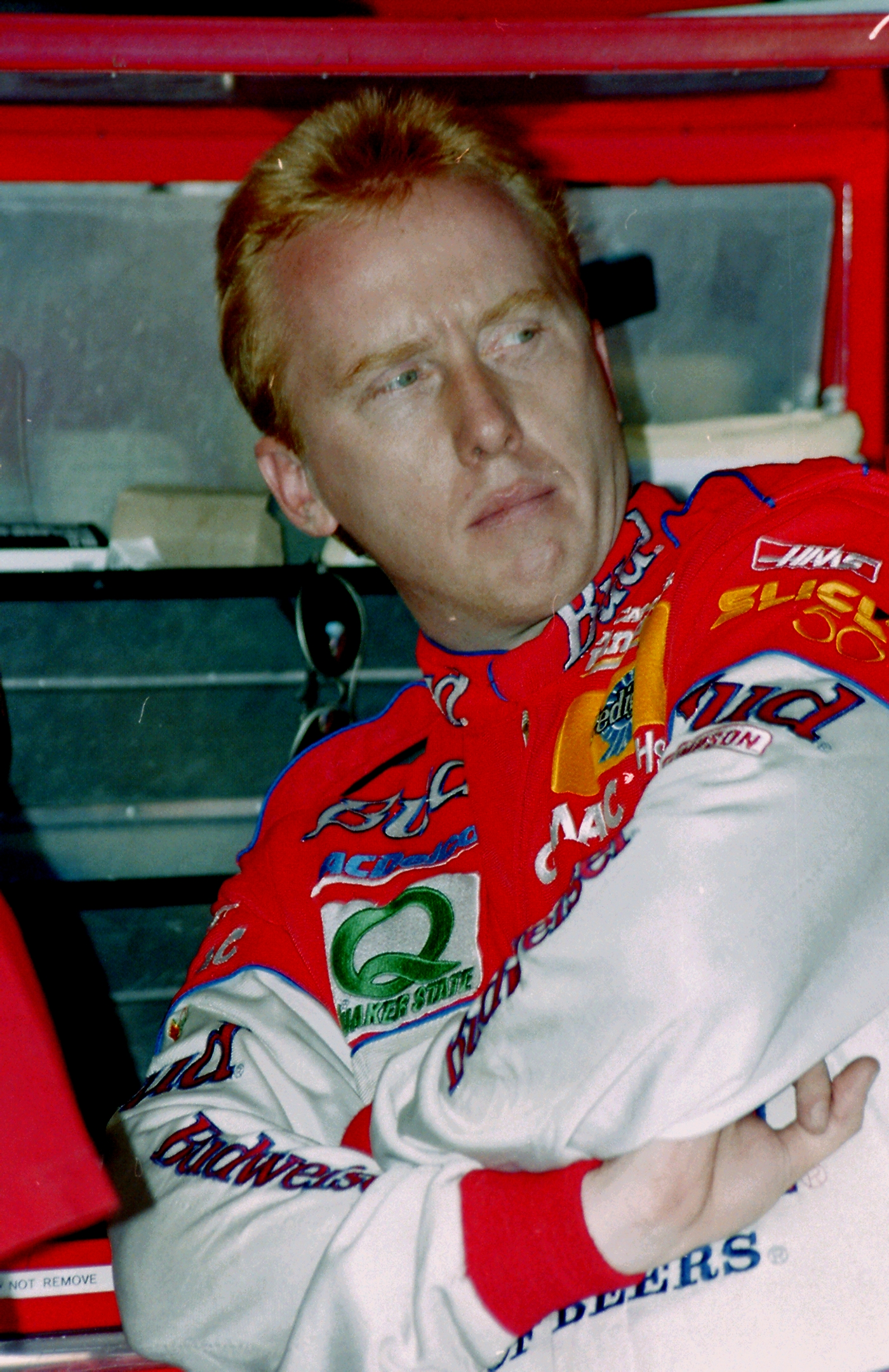
- Craven in 1997
- Born: Richard Allen Craven; May 24, 1966 (age 60); Newburgh, Maine, U.S.
- Achievements: 1991 Busch North Series Champion
- Awards: 1981 Unity Raceway Rookie of the Year; 1990 Busch North Series Rookie of the Year; 1990, 1991 Busch North Series Most Popular Driver; 1992 Busch Series Rookie of the Year; 1995 Winston Cup Series Rookie of the Year

NASCAR Cup Series career
- 278 races run over 11 years
- Best finish: 15th (2002)
- First race: 1991 AC Delco 500 (Rockingham)
- Last race: 2004 EA Sports 500 (Talladega)
- First win: 2001 Old Dominion 500 (Martinsville)
- Last win: 2003 Carolina Dodge Dealers' 400 (Darlington)
Wins	Top tens	Poles
2	41	6

NASCAR O'Reilly Auto Parts Series career
- 142 races run over 14 years
- Best finish: 2nd (1993, 1994)
- First race: 1986 Oxford 250 (Oxford)
- Last race: 2006 Goody's 250 (Martinsville)
- First win: 1991 True Value 250 (Oxford)
- Last win: 1994 Meridian Advantage 200 (Nazareth)
Wins	Top tens	Poles
4	57	7

NASCAR FedEx Freight Truck Series career
- 26 races run over 2 years
- Best finish: 14th (2005)
- First race: 2004 Sylvania 200 Presented By Lowe's (Loudon)
- Last race: 2005 Ford 200 (Homestead)
- First win: 2005 Kroger 200 (Martinsville)
Wins	Top tens	Poles
1	9	0
- Statistics up to date as of December 2, 2012.

Richard Allen Craven (born May 24, 1966) is an American stock car racing analyst and former driver. Prior to his broadcasting duties, he was a NASCAR driver who won in four different series—the ARCA Menards Series, and the three national series.

Craven occasionally served as a pit reporter when NASCAR aired on TBS in the mid-1990s. He is perhaps most well known for winning the 2003 Carolina Dodge Dealers 400, beating Kurt Busch in the closest finish in Cup Series history at the time. A margin of victory, 0.002 seconds, only tied by Jimmie Johnson and Clint Bowyer in April 2011 at Talladega with Jimmie coming out on top. It stood for more than twenty years until Kyle Larson bested Chris Buescher by a margin of 0.001 seconds at Kansas in May of 2024.

== Racing career ==
=== Beginnings ===
Craven began racing at the age of 15 at Unity Raceway, winning twice as well as the Rookie of the Year award. The next year, he won 12 feature events and the track championship. In 1984, Craven raced at Wiscasset Speedway in the Late Model Division; in this year he won the track championship along with the Rookie of the Year title. After that, he began running in the American Canadian Tour, where he had rampant success. In 1986, he made his NASCAR debut at Oxford Plains Speedway in his own No. 12, finishing 25th after suffering an engine failure. Four years later, he began running the Busch North Series, winning the Rookie of the Year award. In 1991, he was named the champion in that series, winning ten times in the No. 25 Chevrolet, with two of those ten wins in "combination" races with the Busch Grand National Series, including the prestigious Oxford 250. In addition, he made his Winston Cup debut at Rockingham, starting and finishing 34th for Dick Moroso. He moved to the Busch Series full-time in 1992 in the No. 99 Chevy for Bill Papke, and once again was named Rookie of the Year. In 1993 and 1994, he finished 2nd to Steve Grissom and David Green, respectively, in the championship standings. On October 9, 1994, Craven would serve as a pit reporter for TBS's broadcast of that year's Mello Yello 500, serving as a precursor to his broadcasting career.

=== 1995–1998 ===
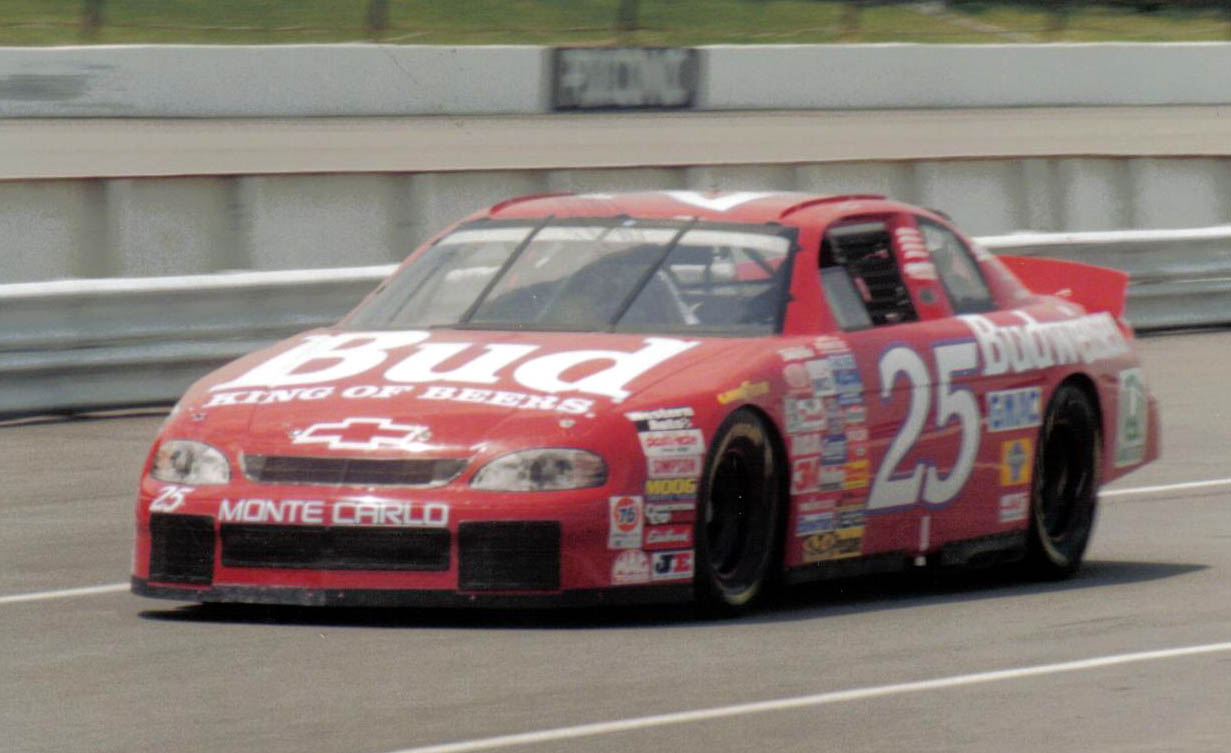
Craven's 1997 race car

In 1995, Craven teamed up with Larry Hedrick Motorsports and Kodiak to run for Winston Cup Rookie of the Year. Craven qualified for all 31 races, finished in the Top 10 four times, and defeated Robert Pressley for the top rookie award. For his efforts, he was rewarded with a partial ownership share in the team. He began 1996 with three consecutive Top 10 finishes and his first career pole. He was 4th in points before the Winston Select 500, during which he was involved in a multi-car wreck. On lap 130, his car was launched into the air and impacted with the catch fence above the wall before being thrown back onto the track and hit by another car. This crash was similar to Jimmy Horton's barrel roll in 1993 where he cleared the track. Craven's flip completely sheared the catchfence off the turn, and NASCAR threw a lengthy red flag to make repairs. He walked away, but fell to 20th in points and only had one Top 5 finish and one pole for the rest of the season

At the end of the year, Craven left Hedrick to drive the No. 25 Budweiser Chevy for Hendrick Motorsports. Craven finished in the Top 5 in the first two races of the season. He finished 3rd in the 1997 Daytona 500 behind his teammates Terry Labonte in second and Jeff Gordon in first, giving Hendrick Motorsports a 1-2-3 sweep of the Daytona 500. While practicing for the inaugural Interstate Batteries 500, Craven crashed hard into the wall. He missed two races due to a concussion suffered from the wreck. Upon his return, he won the Winston Open and finished a then-career-best 19th in points with a total of $1,139,860 in winnings for 1997. After the 1998 season started, the side effects of the concussion began to appear, and Craven was diagnosed with post-concussion syndrome, and was forced to miss several races until he recovered. He returned at his home track at New Hampshire International Speedway later that year, where he won the pole. After four races, he was released from Hendrick, and did not return until the final three races of the season, filling in for Ernie Irvan at MB2 Motorsports.

=== 1999–2006 ===
For 1999, Craven signed on to drive the No. 58 Ford Taurus for Scott Barbour's SBIII Motorsports, a brand new team in NASCAR. He did not finish any better than 19th while driving the car, although he did score the team a Winston West Series win in the California 200, and after he failed to qualify for the Coca-Cola 600, he was replaced by Loy Allen Jr. Several weeks later, he signed up with another new team Midwest Transit Racing, replacing rookie Dan Pardus in the No. 50 and finished the season with them. Craven returned to the team in 2000 but after failing to qualify for four of the first nine races of the season, the team switched to a part-time schedule. Following this decision, Craven had four Top 20 finishes but finished 44th in points.

In January the next year, it was announced that Craven would replace Scott Pruett in PPI Motorsports's No. 32 Tide Ford. He won the pole in the summer race at Michigan International Speedway, and in the Old Dominion 500 at Martinsville Speedway, he held off Dale Jarrett for his first career Winston Cup win. In 2002, he won two poles, scored nine Top 10 finishes, and finished a career-best 15th in points. In 2003, his team switched from Ford to Pontiac, providing the No. 32 car with a factory-backed engine program. In the Carolina Dodge Dealers 400 at Darlington Raceway, he battled Kurt Busch for the win, defeating him by .002 seconds in what was voted in December 2009 as the "Finish of the 2000s" in the Sprint Cup Series. In that race, he became the last person to win in a Pontiac. Craven failed to win races again that season and dropped twelve spots in the points standings. After he did not post a single Top 10 finish three-quarters of the way through 2004, he was replaced by Bobby Hamilton Jr., and only returned to run at New Hampshire Motor Speedway, his home track. His last Cup start was the 2004 EA Sports 500 at Talladega, where he drove in a development car for Joe Gibbs Racing, the No. 11 Chevrolet.

In 2005, Craven moved to the Craftsman Truck Series to drive the No. 99 Ford for Roush Racing. Craven was second in points after nine races, and there was talk about him being promoted to Mark Martin's No. 6 Nextel Cup ride for 2006. However, a brutal stretch of finishes led to a free fall in the point standings, and it was announced that he would be gone from Roush at the end of the year. Craven did win at Martinsville Speedway late in the year, and finished fourteenth in points.

Craven's final NASCAR start came at the Goody's 250 at Martinsville in the Busch Series for FitzBradshaw Racing in 2006. He finished 39th after the brakes failed on his No. 14 Dodge.

=== Retirement from racing ===
He eventually retired and worked for ESPN and Yahoo! Sports as a NASCAR analyst. In January 2019, he departed ESPN after 12 full years with the network to work for Fox. Craven later left Fox at the conclusion of the 2020 season to pursue a new Ricky Craven Motorsports venture. He previously owned a motorsports dealership by that name in Belfast, Maine. In 2025 he bought Speedway 95 in Hermon, Maine, which he renamed Ricky Craven Speedway.

== Personal life ==
Craven graduated from Hampden Academy in Hampden, Maine.

== Motorsports career results ==
=== NASCAR ===
(key) (Bold – Pole position awarded by qualifying time. Italics – Pole position earned by points standings or practice time. * – Most laps led.)

==== Winston Cup Series ====
NASCAR Nextel Cup Series results
Year	Team	No.	Make	1	2	3	4	5	6	7	8	9	10	11	12	13	14	15	16	17	18	19	20	21	22	23	24	25	26	27	28	29	30	31	32	33	34	35	36	NNCC	Pts	Ref
1991	Moroso Racing	20	Olds	DAY	RCH	CAR	ATL	DAR	BRI	NWS	MAR	TAL	CLT	DOV	SON	POC	MCH	DAY	POC	TAL	GLN	MCH	BRI	DAR	RCH	DOV	MAR	NWS	CLT	CAR; 34	PHO	ATL								82nd	61	
1995	Larry Hedrick Motorsports	41	Chevy	DAY; 16	CAR; 16	RCH; 38	ATL; 12	DAR; 42	BRI; 29	NWS; 33	MAR; 18	TAL; 17	SON; 25	CLT; 10	DOV; 22	POC; 26	MCH; 33	DAY; 22	NHA; 31	POC; 25	TAL; 26	IND; 31	GLN; 10	MCH; 7	BRI; 32	DAR; 18	RCH; 29	DOV; 22	MAR; 35	NWS; 21	CLT; 25	CAR; 8	PHO; 24	ATL; 30						24th	2883	
1996	Larry Hedrick Motorsports	41	Chevy	DAY; 13	CAR; 3	RCH; 17	ATL; 12	DAR; 3	BRI; 9	NWS; 7	**MAR**; 12	TAL; 36	SON; 31	CLT; 37	DOV; 14	POC; 17	MCH; 29	DAY; 22	**NHA**; 26	POC; 20	TAL; 19	IND; 34	GLN; 36	MCH; 18	BRI; 21	DAR; 42	RCH; 28	DOV; 35	MAR; 26	NWS; 22	CLT; 5	CAR; 22	PHO; 34	ATL; 35						20th	3078	
1997	Hendrick Motorsports	25	Chevy	DAY; 3	CAR; 5	RCH; 14	ATL; 35	DAR; 40	TEX	BRI	MAR; 22	SON; 39	TAL; 27	CLT; 37	DOV; 13	POC; 16	MCH; 18	CAL; 9	DAY; 37	NHA; 16	POC; 18	IND; 16	GLN; 17	MCH; 12	BRI; 13	DAR; 31	RCH; 18	NHA; 5	DOV; 41	MAR; 8	CLT; 25	TAL; 6	CAR; 3*	PHO; 43	ATL; 39					19th	3108	
1998	Hendrick Motorsports	50	Chevy	DAY; 14	CAR; 10	LVS; 27	ATL; 34	DAR	BRI	TEX	MAR	TAL	CAL	CLT	DOV	RCH	MCH	POC	SON	**NHA**; 29	POC; 41	IND; 17	GLN; 35	MCH	BRI	NHA	DAR	RCH	DOV	MAR	CLT	TAL								46th	907	
1998	MB2 Motorsports	36	Pontiac																														DAY; QL^{†}	PHO; 30	CAR; 37	ATL; 25				46th	907	
1999	SBIII Motorsports	58	Ford	DAY; 26	CAR; 22	LVS; 39	ATL; 42	DAR; 37	TEX; 27	BRI; 41	MAR; 43	TAL; 27	CAL; 34	RCH; 19	CLT; DNQ	DOV; 31	MCH	POC	SON																					41st	1513	
1999	Midwest Transit Racing	50	Chevy																	DAY; 43	NHA; 13	POC	IND; 34	GLN	MCH; 30	BRI; 42	DAR	RCH	NHA; 43	DOV; 40	MAR; 24	CLT; 43	TAL	CAR; 41	PHO; 30	HOM; 32	ATL; DNQ			41st	1513	
2000	Midwest Transit Racing	50	Chevy	DAY; DNQ	CAR; DNQ	LVS; 40	ATL	DAR; DNQ	BRI; DNQ	TEX	MAR; 31	TAL; 29	CAL	RCH; 40	CLT; 42	DOV	MCH; DNQ	POC	SON	DAY; 29	NHA; 17	POC	IND; 41	GLN	MCH; 37	BRI; DNQ	DAR	RCH; 26	NHA; 36	DOV	MAR; 20	CLT; DNQ	TAL; 30	CAR; 15	PHO; 18	HOM; DNQ	ATL; 30			44th	1175	
2001	PPI Motorsports	32	Ford	DAY; 23	CAR; 5	LVS; 41	ATL; 13	DAR; 27	BRI; 23	TEX; 27	MAR; 28	TAL; 15	CAL; 41	RCH; 43	CLT; 31	DOV; 4	MCH; 35	POC; 43	SON; 16	DAY; 33	CHI; 21	NHA; 38	POC; 10	IND; 9	GLN; 35	**MCH**; 2	BRI; 38	DAR; 18	RCH; 11	DOV; 26	KAN; 21	CLT; 35	MAR; 1*	TAL; 24	PHO; 8	CAR; 12	HOM; 30	ATL; 38	NHA; 38	21st	3379	
2002	PPI Motorsports	32	Ford	DAY; 17	**CAR**; 5	LVS; 31	ATL; 5	**DAR**; 41	BRI; 13	TEX; 14	MAR; 30	TAL; 18	CAL; 37	RCH; 9	CLT; 3	DOV; 7	POC; 14	MCH; 15	SON; 19	DAY; 23	CHI; 20	NHA; 21	POC; 17	IND; 33	GLN; 34	MCH; 17	BRI; 16	DAR; 14	RCH; 21	NHA; 6	DOV; 9	KAN; 38	TAL; 15	CLT; 36	MAR; 7	ATL; 21	CAR; 9	PHO; 34	HOM; 24	15th	3888	
2003	PPI Motorsports	32	Pontiac	DAY; 26	CAR; 4	LVS; 36	ATL; 12	DAR; 1	BRI; 15	TEX; 21	TAL; 4	MAR; 27	CAL; 15	RCH; 38	CLT; 38	DOV; 8	POC; 10	MCH; 15	SON; 21	DAY; 43	CHI; 25	NHA; 21	POC; 40	IND; 17	GLN; 28	MCH; 40	BRI; 8	DAR; 8	RCH; 30	NHA; 38	DOV; 40	TAL; 8	KAN; 41	CLT; 19	MAR; 32	ATL; 35	PHO; 38	CAR; 39	HOM; 29	27th	3334	
2004	PPI Motorsports	32	Chevy	DAY; 23	CAR; 35	LVS; 25	ATL; 22	DAR; 36	BRI; 22	TEX; 28	MAR; 16	TAL; 43	CAL; 18	RCH; 26	CLT; 24	DOV; 16	POC; 34	MCH; 29	SON; 16	DAY; 38	CHI; 38	NHA; 38	POC; 20	IND; 24	GLN; 32	MCH; 35	BRI; 34	CAL	RCH	NHA; 17	DOV									34th	2086	
2004	Joe Gibbs Racing	11	Chevy																													TAL; 30	KAN	CLT	MAR	ATL	PHO	DAR	HOM	34th	2086	
^{†} - Qualified for Ernie Irvan

===== Daytona 500 =====
Year	Team	Manufacturer	Start	Finish
1995	Larry Hedrick Motorsports	Chevrolet	14	16
1996	Larry Hedrick Motorsports	Chevrolet	36	13
1997	Hendrick Motorsports	Chevrolet	40	3
1998	Hendrick Motorsports	Chevrolet	32	14
1999	SBIII Motorsports	Ford	28	26
2000	Midwest Transit Racing	Chevrolet	DNQ	
2001	PPI Motorsports	Ford	18	23
2002	PPI Motorsports	Ford	43	17
2003	PPI Motorsports	Pontiac	25	26
2004	PPI Motorsports	Chevrolet	28	23

==== Busch Series ====
NASCAR Busch Series results
Year	Team	No.	Make	1	2	3	4	5	6	7	8	9	10	11	12	13	14	15	16	17	18	19	20	21	22	23	24	25	26	27	28	29	30	31	32	33	34	35	NBSC	Pts	Ref
1986	Craven Racing	12	Chevy	DAY	CAR	HCY	MAR	BRI	DAR	SBO	LGY	JFC	DOV	CLT	SBO	HCY	ROU	IRP	SBO	RAL	OXF; 25	SBO	HCY	LGY	ROU	BRI	DAR	RCH	DOV	MAR	ROU	CLT	CAR	MAR					122nd	0	
1987	Craven Racing	09	Buick	DAY	HCY	MAR	DAR	BRI	LGY	SBO	CLT	DOV	IRP	ROU	JFC	OXF; 17	SBO	HCY	RAL	LGY	ROU	BRI	JFC	DAR	RCH	DOV	MAR	CLT	CAR	MAR									95th	-	
1990	Craven Racing	25	Pontiac	DAY	RCH	CAR	MAR	HCY	DAR	BRI	LAN	SBO	NZH	HCY	CLT	DOV	ROU	VOL	MYB	OXF; 34												**NHA**; 4	CAR	MAR					65th	258	
1990	Craven Racing	28	Pontiac																		NHA; 42	SBO	DUB	IRP	ROU	BRI	DAR	RCH	DOV	MAR	CLT								65th	258	
1991	Craven Racing	2	Chevy	DAY	RCH; 14	CAR								NZH; 19	CLT	DOV	ROU	HCY	MYB	GLN																			40th	782	
1991	Craven Racing	85	Chevy				MAR; 26	VOL	HCY	DAR	BRI	LAN	SBO								NHA; 40																		40th	782	
1991	Craven Racing	28	Chevy																			OXF; 1*	SBO	DUB	IRP	ROU	BRI	DAR	RCH	DOV	CLT								40th	782	
1991	Craven Racing	25	Chevy																													**NHA**; 1*	CAR						40th	782	
1991	Craven Racing	20	Chevy																															MAR; 32					40th	782	
1992	J&J Racing	99	Chevy	DAY; 13	CAR; 8	RCH; 15	ATL; 30	**MAR**; 15	DAR; 19	BRI; 22	HCY; 18	LAN; 11	DUB; 24	NZH; 10	CLT; 16	DOV; 14	ROU; 23	MYB; 10	GLN; 24	VOL; 12	NHA; 12	TAL; 21	IRP; 18	ROU; 7	MCH; 13	NHA; 9	BRI; 21	DAR; 25	RCH; 18	DOV; 19	CLT; 15	MAR; 20	CAR; 25	HCY; 29					14th	3456	
1993	J&J Racing	99	Chevy	DAY; 22	CAR; 14	RCH; 6	DAR; 27	BRI; 19	HCY; 2	ROU; 28	MAR; 3	NZH; 8	CLT; 25	DOV; 8	MYB; 13	GLN; 37	MLW; 10	TAL; 10	IRP; 7	MCH; 6	NHA; 8	BRI; 6	**DAR**; 9	RCH; 28	DOV; 2	ROU; 2	CLT; 26	MAR; 3	CAR; 10	HCY; 4	ATL; 15								2nd	3593	
1994	RC Racing	2	Chevy	DAY; 35	CAR; 24	RCH; 7	ATL; 17	MAR; 12	DAR; 14	HCY; 1*	BRI; 15	ROU; 5	NHA; 22	NZH; 1*	CLT; 11	**DOV**; 5	MYB; 3	GLN; 7	MLW; 10	SBO; 21	TAL; 32	HCY; 7	IRP; 6	MCH; 23	BRI; 4	DAR; 8	RCH; 24	DOV; 3	CLT; 8	MAR; 8	CAR; 3								2nd	3679	
1995	RC Racing	2	Chevy	DAY	CAR	RCH	ATL	NSV	DAR; 26	BRI	HCY	NHA; DNQ	NZH	CLT	DOV; 3	MYB	GLN; 3	MLW	TAL	SBO	IRP	MCH; 4	BRI	DAR; 34	RCH	DOV; 28*	CLT; 39	CAR	HOM; DNQ										43rd	761	
1996	RC Racing	2	Chevy	DAY	CAR; 4	RCH	ATL	NSV	DAR; 4	BRI	HCY	NZH	CLT	DOV; 2	SBO	MYB	GLN; 16	MLW	NHA	TAL	IRP	**MCH**; 5	BRI; 31	DAR; 6	RCH	**DOV**; 5*	CLT; 20	CAR; 3	HOM; 21										29th	1503	
1997	RC Racing	2	Chevy	DAY	CAR; 6	RCH	ATL	LVS	DAR; 15	HCY	TEX	BRI	NSV	TAL	NHA	NZH	CLT; 39	DOV; 16	SBO	GLN	MLW; 37	MYB	GTY; 32	IRP	MCH	BRI	DAR; 10	RCH	DOV; 28	CLT; 41	CAL	CAR; 3	HOM						43rd	1063	
1998	RC Racing	2	Chevy	DAY	CAR	LVS	NSV	DAR	BRI	TEX	HCY	TAL	NHA	NZH	CLT	DOV	RCH	PPR	GLN; 9	MLW	MYB	CAL	SBO	IRP	MCH; 25	BRI; 22	DAR	RCH	DOV; 9	CLT; 37	GTY	CAR; 43	ATL	HOM					57th	547	
1999	Innovative Motorsports	47	Chevy	DAY	CAR	LVS	ATL	DAR	TEX	NSV	BRI	TAL	CAL	NHA	RCH	NZH	CLT	DOV	SBO	GLN	MLW	MYB	PPR	GTY	IRP	MCH; DNQ	BRI	DAR	RCH	DOV	CLT	CAR	MEM	PHO	HOM				NA	-	
2000	RC Racing	32	Chevy	DAY	CAR	LVS	ATL	DAR	BRI; 7	TEX	NSV	TAL	CAL	RCH																									63rd	490	
2000	RC Racing	23	Chevy												NHA; 34	CLT	DOV	SBO	MYB	GLN	MLW	NZH	PPR	GTY	IRP		BRI; 18	DAR	RCH	DOV									63rd	490	
2000	Team Rensi Motorsports	25	Chevy																							MCH; 24													63rd	490	
2000	Emerald Performance Group	19	Chevy																												CLT; DNQ	CAR; 42	MEM	PHO; DNQ	HOM; 39				63rd	490	
2004	Richard Childress Racing	29	Chevy	DAY	CAR	LVS	DAR	BRI	TEX	NSH	TAL	CAL	GTY	RCH	NZH	CLT	DOV	NSH	KEN	MLW	DAY	CHI; 11	NHA	PPR	IRP	MCH	BRI	CAL	RCH	DOV	KAN	CLT	MEM	ATL	PHO	DAR	HOM		106th	130	
2006	Fitz Motorsports	14	Dodge	DAY	CAL	MXC	LVS	ATL	BRI	TEX	NSH	PHO	TAL	RCH	DAR	CLT	DOV	NSH	KEN	MLW	DAY	CHI	NHA	MAR; 39	GTY	IRP	GLN	MCH	BRI	CAL	RCH	DOV	KAN	CLT	MEM	TEX	PHO	HOM	139th	46	

==== Craftsman Truck Series ====
NASCAR Craftsman Truck Series results
Year	Team	No.	Make	1	2	3	4	5	6	7	8	9	10	11	12	13	14	15	16	17	18	19	20	21	22	23	24	25	NCTC	Pts	Ref
2004	Morgan-Dollar Motorsports	47	Chevy	DAY	ATL	MAR	MFD	CLT	DOV	TEX	MEM	MLW	KAN	KEN	GTW	MCH	IRP	NSH	BRI	RCH	NHA; 31	LVS	CAL	TEX	MAR	PHO	DAR	HOM	105th	70	
2005	Roush Racing	99	Ford	DAY; 4	CAL; 3	ATL; 18	MAR; 2	GTY; 10	MFD; 8	CLT; 10	DOV; 7	TEX; 13	MCH; 33	MLW; 21	KAN; 13	KEN; 13	MEM; 27	IRP; 25	NSH; 24	BRI; 32	RCH; 20	NHA; 11	LVS; 23	MAR; 1*	ATL; 9	TEX; 21	PHO; 32	HOM; 21	14th	2976	

==== Winston West Series ====
NASCAR Winston West Series results
Year	Team	No.	Make	1	2	3	4	5	6	7	8	9	10	11	12	13	14	NWWSC	Pts	Ref
1999	SBIII Motorsports	58	Ford	TUS	LVS; 23	PHO	CAL; 1	PPR	MMR	IRW	EVG	POR	IRW	RMR	LVS	MMR	MOT	44th	279	

Sporting positions
Preceded by Jamie Aube	NASCAR Busch North Series champion 1991	Succeeded by Dick McCabe
Achievements
Preceded by Jeff Burton	NASCAR Winston Cup Series Rookie of the Year; 1995	Succeeded by Johnny Benson Jr.
Preceded by Jeff Gordon	NASCAR Busch Series Rookie of the Year; 1992	Succeeded by Hermie Sadler
