= Martin Truex =

Martin Truex may refer to:

- Martin Truex Sr. (1958–2025), American racing driver
- Martin Truex Jr. (born 1980), American racing driver and Monster Energy NASCAR Cup Series champion

== See also ==
- Truex, surname
