= Bobby Dragon =

American racing driver (born 1946)

- Born: January 11, 1946 (age 80); Milton, Vermont, U.S.

NASCAR O'Reilly Auto Parts Series career
- 25 races run over 8 years
- Best finish: 55th (1986)
- First race: 1986 Budweiser 200 (Bristol)
- Last race: 1995 Lysol 200 (Watkins Glen)
Wins	Top tens	Poles
0	6	0

ARCA Menards Series East career
- 248 races run over 17 years
- Best finish: 3rd (1987)
- First race: 1987 Country Squire Homes 200 (Darlington)
- Last race: 2004 MBNA America 150 (Dover)
- First win: 1987 Murray's Ford 150 (Central PA)
- Last win: 1997 Nazareth 100 (Nazareth)
Wins	Top tens	Poles
14	115	0
- Statistics up to date as of January 28, 2025.

Bobby Dragon (born January 11, 1946) is an American former stock car racing driver. He competed in such series as the NASCAR Busch Series, NASCAR Busch Grand National North Series, and what is now the American Canadian Tour.

== Racing career ==
Dragon began racing in the late 1960s, driving late models and modifieds, winning many championships over the years. Dragon competed in what is now the American Canadian Tour, winning 17 races between 1979 and 1985. Dragon made his NASCAR Busch Grand National Series debut in 1986. He attempted eight races in the No. 71 Buick, making the field in seven of them. He ran seven more races the following year, in addition to running nearly the entire NASCAR Busch Grand National North Series, where he would win a race. Dragon ran a handful of NASCAR Busch Series races between 1988 and 1995, finishing a career high fourth in a race at Oxford Plains Speedway in 1988. He also continued competing in the Busch North series, running races between the late 1980s and 2004, where he competed full time for the first time. Dragon won 14 races in the series, as well as finishing in the top-ten 115 times. Dragon was inducted into the New England Auto Racers Hall of Fame in 2009 and the Vermont Sports Hall of Fame in 2015. Bobby and his brother Beaver were inducted into the Living Legends of Auto Racing Hall of Fame in 2018.
