= Dale Shaw =

American racing driver (born 1964)

- Born: Dale Shaw; April 9, 1964 (age 62); Center Conway, New Hampshire, U.S.

NASCAR O'Reilly Auto Parts Series career
- 45 races run over 13 years
- Best finish: 36th (1988)
- First race: 1986 Oxford 250 (Oxford)
- Last race: 1999 Textilease/Medique 300 Presented by Advance Auto Parts (South Boston)
Wins	Top tens	Poles
0	9	0

NASCAR FedEx Freight Truck Series career
- 1 race run over 1 year
- Best finish: 110th (2001)
- First race: 2001 New England 200 (Loudon)
- Last race: 2001 New England 200 (Loudon)
Wins	Top tens	Poles
0	0	0

Dale Shaw (born April 9, 1964) is an American former stock car racing driver. Shaw competed in 45 NASCAR O'Reilly Auto Parts Series races between 1987 and 1999, achieving nine top-ten finishes. He also competed in 270 ARCA Menards Series East races between 1987 and 2005, winning 19 races and reaching the top-ten 139 times. He also won the series' 1994 title, doing so without winning a single race, making him the only driver to do so in NASCAR history (at the time he won the title, the series was known as the Busch East Series) until Austin Dillon won the then-Nationwide Series title in 2013.

== Motorsports career results ==
=== NASCAR ===
(key) (Bold – Pole position awarded by qualifying time. Italics – Pole position earned by points standings or practice time. * – Most laps led.)

==== Busch Series ====
NASCAR Busch Series results
Year	Team	No.	Make	1	2	3	4	5	6	7	8	9	10	11	12	13	14	15	16	17	18	19	20	21	22	23	24	25	26	27	28	29	30	31	32	NBSC	Pts	Ref
1986	Shaw Racing	60	Chevy	DAY	CAR	HCY	MAR	BRI	DAR	SBO	LGY	JFC	DOV	CLT	SBO	HCY	ROU	IRP	SBO	RAL	OXF; 14	SBO	HCY	LGY	ROU	BRI	DAR	RCH	DOV	MAR	ROU	CLT	CAR	MAR		128th		
1987	Shaw Racing	60	Chevy	DAY	HCY	MAR	DAR	BRI	LGY	SBO	CLT	DOV	IRP	ROU	JFC	OXF; 9	SBO	HCY	RAL	LGY	ROU	BRI	JFC	DAR	RCH	DOV	MAR	CLT	CAR	MAR						100th		
1988	Shaw Racing	60	Pontiac	DAY; 43	HCY	CAR; 19	MAR	DAR; 27	BRI	LNG	NZH; 16	SBO	NSV	CLT	DOV; 33	ROU	LAN	LVL	MYB	OXF; 20	SBO	HCY	LNG	IRP; 25	ROU	BRI	DAR; 37	RCH; 18	DOV; 19	MAR	CLT	CAR	MAR			36th	756	
1989	Shaw Racing	60	Pontiac	DAY	CAR	MAR	HCY	DAR	BRI	NZH; 10	SBO	LAN	NSV	CLT	DOV	ROU	LVL	VOL	MYB	SBO	HCY	DUB	IRP	ROU	BRI	DAR	RCH	DOV	MAR	CLT	CAR	MAR				76th	134	
1990	Shaw Racing	60	Pontiac	DAY	RCH	CAR	MAR	HCY	DAR	BRI	LAN	SBO	NZH	HCY	CLT	DOV	ROU	VOL	MYB	OXF; 43	NHA; DNQ	SBO	DUB	IRP	ROU	BRI	DAR	RCH	DOV	MAR	CLT	NHA	CAR	MAR		110th	34	
1991	Mountain Racing	09	Pontiac	DAY	RCH; 33	CAR	MAR	VOL	HCY	DAR	BRI	LAN	SBO	NZH	CLT	DOV	ROU	HCY	MYB	GLN	OXF; 31	NHA; 17	SBO	DUB	IRP	ROU	BRI	DAR	RCH	DOV	CLT					69th	280	
1991	Mountain Racing	60	Pontiac																													NHA; 43	CAR	MAR		69th	280	
1992	Shaw Racing	60	Pontiac	DAY	CAR	RCH	ATL	MAR	DAR	BRI	HCY	LAN	DUB	NZH	CLT	DOV	ROU	MYB	GLN	VOL	NHA; 25	TAL	IRP	ROU	MCH	NHA; 34	BRI	DAR	RCH	DOV	CLT	MAR	CAR	HCY		89th	149	
1994	Boisvert Racing	7	Pontiac	DAY	CAR	RCH	ATL	MAR	DAR	HCY	BRI	ROU	NHA; 14	NZH; 30	CLT	DOV	MYB	GLN; 13	MLW	SBO	TAL	HCY	IRP	MCH	BRI	DAR	RCH	DOV	CLT	MAR	CAR					N/A	N/A	
1995	Boisvert Racing	7	Pontiac	DAY	CAR	RCH	ATL	NSV	DAR	BRI	HCY	NHA; 18	NZH; 26	CLT	DOV	MYB	GLN; 39	MLW	TAL	SBO	IRP	MCH	BRI	DAR	RCH	DOV	CLT	CAR	HOM							N/A	N/A	
1996	Shaw Racing	60	Pontiac	DAY	CAR	RCH	ATL	NSV	DAR	BRI	HCY	NZH; 36	CLT	DOV	SBO	MYB	GLN	MLW	NHA	TAL	IRP	MCH	BRI	DAR	RCH	DOV	CLT	CAR	HOM							N/A	N/A	
1997	Porter Racing	48	Ford	DAY; 30																																39th	1258	
1997	Porter Racing	84	Ford																														HOM; 39			39th	1258	
1997	Phoenix Racing	4	Chevy		CAR	RCH	ATL	LVS	DAR	HCY	TEX	BRI	NSV	TAL	NHA; 10	NZH; 5	CLT	DOV	SBO; 2	GLN	MLW; 8	MYB; 35	GTY; 3	IRP; 24	MCH; 10	BRI; 42	DAR; 31	RCH; 6	DOV; 34	CLT; DNQ	CAL	CAR				39th	1258	
1998	Porter Racing	48	Ford	DAY; DNQ	CAR; DNQ	LVS; 39	NSV	DAR	BRI	TEX	HCY	TAL	NHA	NZH	CLT	DOV	RCH	PPR	GLN	MLW	MYB	CAL														95th	116	
1998	Shaw Racing	06	Ford																				SBO; 31	IRP	MCH	BRI	DAR	RCH	DOV	CLT	GTY	CAR	ATL	HOM		95th	116	
1999	Shaw Racing	7	Ford	DAY	CAR	LVS	ATL	DAR	TEX	NSV	BRI	TAL	CAL	NHA	RCH	NZH; 44	CLT	DOV																		117th	67	
1999	Shoemaker Racing	64	Chevy																SBO; 32	GLN	MLW	MYB	PPR	GTY	IRP	MCH	BRI	DAR	RCH	DOV	CLT	CAR	MEM	PHO	HOM	117th	67	

==== Craftsman Truck Series ====
NASCAR Craftsman Truck Series results
Year	Team	No.	Make	1	2	3	4	5	6	7	8	9	10	11	12	13	14	15	16	17	18	19	20	21	22	23	24	NCTC	Pts	Ref
2001	Troxell Racing	93	Chevy	DAY	HOM	MMR	MAR	GTY	DAR	PPR	DOV	TEX	MEM	MLW	KAN	KEN	NHA; 33	IRP	NSH	CIC	NZH	RCH	SBO	TEX	LVS	PHO	CAL	110th	64	
