= Gresham Motorsports Park =

Motorsports venue in the United States

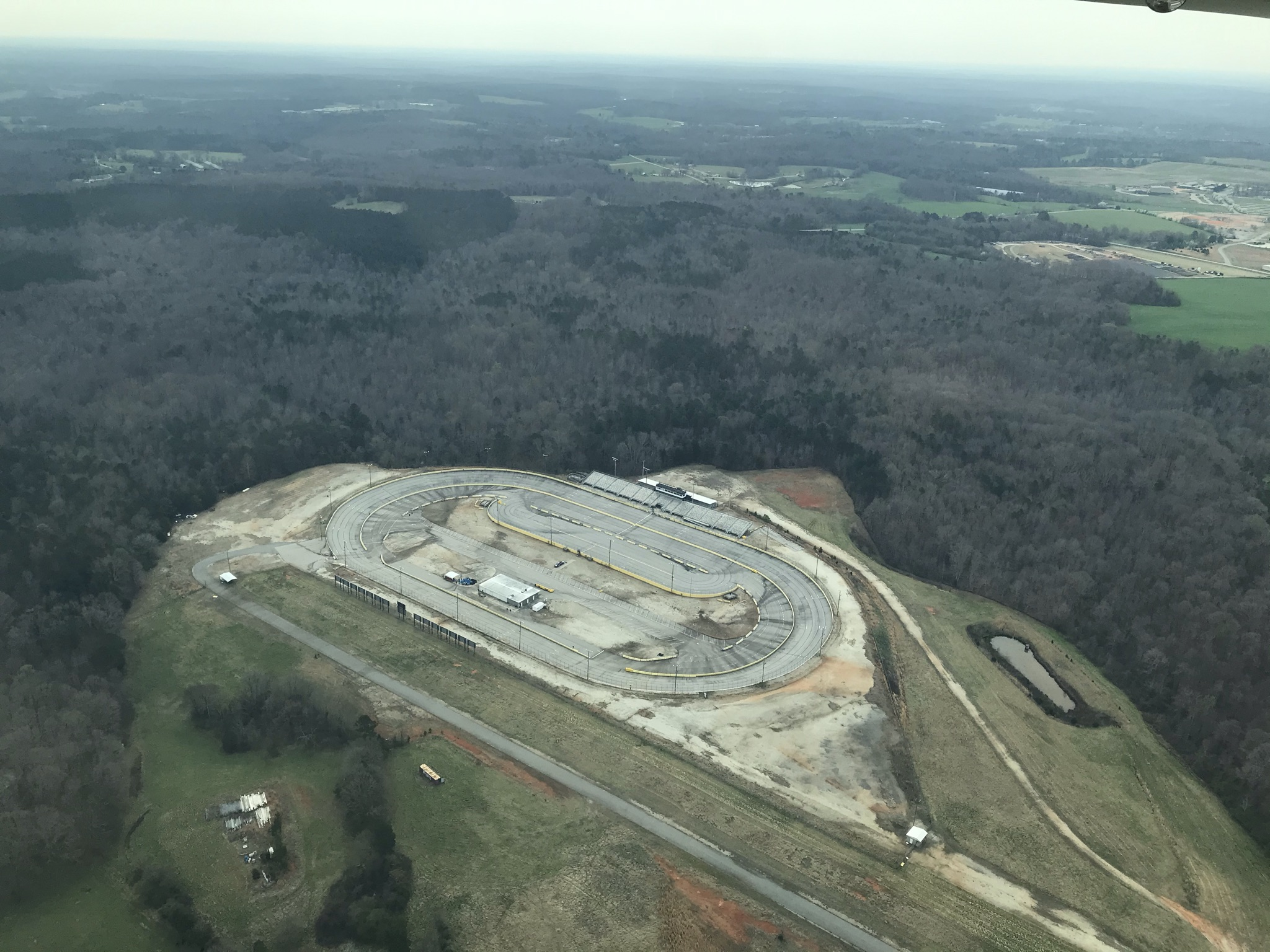
- Gresham Motorsports Park in 2021
- Location: Jefferson, Georgia, United States
- Coordinates: 34°10′0″N 83°33′9″W
- Opened: 1967; 2020 (one race event only)
- Closed: 2014
- Former names: Peach State Speedway (1990s); Jefco Speedway (1967–1989)
- Major events: NASCAR K&N Pro Series East (2010–2012); X-1R Pro Cup Series (1997–2007, 2010); ASA National Tour (1998–1999); NASCAR Southeast Series (1991–1996); NASCAR Busch Grand National Series (1986–1987); NASCAR Grand National Series (1968–1969)

Oval (1967–2014, 2020)
- Surface: Asphalt
- Length: 0.500 mi (0.805 km)
- Turns: 4
- Banking: 12°

Gresham Motorsports Park (formerly Jefco Speedway, Georgia International Speedway and Peach State Speedway) is a 0.500 mi (0.805 km) paved oval auto racing track in Jefferson, Georgia. The track opened in 1967, named Jefco Speedway. Tom Pistone won the inaugural event, a NASCAR Late Model Sportsman race. Two NASCAR Grand National races were held at the track in 1968 and 1969, won by Cale Yarborough and Bobby Isaac. Since 1983, the track has held the World Crown 300 for late model stock cars. The track was renamed Peach State Speedway in the early 1990s. The circuit was renamed and extensively renovated in 2009. NASCAR started running NASCAR K&N Pro Series East from 2010 to 2012.

== NASCAR results ==
NASCAR Grand National Series races were held in 1968 and 1969. NASCAR Busch Grand National Series races were held in 1986 and 1987.

=== Grand National/Cup ===
Season	Date	Winning driver	Car	Length	Average Speed
1968	November 3	Cale Yarborough	Mercury	100 miles (160 km)	77.737 mph (125.106 km/h)
1969	November 3	Bobby Isaac	Dodge	100 miles (160 km)	85.106 mph (136.965 km/h)

=== Busch Series ===
Season	Date	Winning driver	Car	Length	Average Speed
1986	May 10	Darrell Waltrip	Chevrolet	100 miles (160 km)	85.776 mph (138.043 km/h)
1987	July 5	Larry Pearson	Chevrolet	100 miles (160 km)	75.869 mph (122.099 km/h)
1987	August 30	Larry Pearson	Chevrolet	100 miles (160 km)	74.969 mph (120.651 km/h)

== Films ==
The track (then going by the name Georgia International Speedway) was used in filming some parts of the 1982 Six Pack comedy-drama film directed by Daniel Petrie and starring Kenny Rogers, Diane Lane, Erin Gray, Anthony Michael Hall, and Barry Corbin. Some local Jefferson teens were used as extras in the film.
