= ARCA Menards Series East =

American auto racing series

- Category: Stock car racing
- Country: United States
- Inaugural season: 1987
- Manufacturers: Chevrolet · Ford · Toyota
- Engine suppliers: Ilmor (ARCA Ilmor 396); Roush-Yates (RYR Spec); Chevrolet (350 small block, SB2); Dodge (R5P6); Ford (351 Windsor)
- Tire suppliers: General Tire
- Drivers' champion: Tristan McKee
- Makes' champion: Chevrolet
- Teams' champion: Pinnacle Racing Group
- Official website: ARCA Racing

The ARCA Menards Series East (formerly known by other names) is an American regional stock car racing series owned and operated by the Automobile Racing Club of America (ARCA) and the National Association for Stock Car Auto Racing (NASCAR).

Races are held at oval tracks ranging from 1/3 to 1 mile (0.54–1.61 km) in length and on two road courses, 1.53 and 2.45 miles (2.46 and 3.94 km) in length. Most races are stand-alone events (i.e. not in conjunction with other NASCAR touring series), but there are three race weekends that are in combination with the NASCAR Cup Series.

Many of the ARCA Menards Series East drivers on the series are gaining experience with the hopes of moving up to one of the major NASCAR series, however some of the drivers are right at home in the series and have no plans of moving on. The series is not only developmental for drivers (including Joey Logano, Martin Truex Jr., Ricky Craven, Mike McLaughlin, Austin Dillon, Trevor Bayne, Brian Ickler, Ricky Carmichael and Ryan Truex), but for crew members (such as Greg Zipadelli and Marc Puchalski) and officials, as well.

The other regional division at the Grand National level of ARCA is the Menards Series West.

== History ==
The series' logo from 2007 on back.

The series' logo in 2008 and 2009.

Formed as the NASCAR Busch Grand National North Series in 1987, the series originally raced primarily in the Northeastern United States, including Maine, New Hampshire, Vermont, Massachusetts, New York, New Jersey, Connecticut, and Pennsylvania. Drivers in the series could compete in combination races with then named Busch Grand National Series (now O'Reilly Auto Parts Series) that were held at various tracks over the years, including but not limited to Daytona International Speedway, Nazareth Speedway, Watkins Glen International and New Hampshire Motor Speedway. Combination races were on the schedule until 2001. In 2002, a big crash occurred at the Glen that saw many cars spinning through the esses on lap one, along with Troy Williams actually overturning over the guardrail. No one was hurt.

In 1994, it became the first NASCAR-sanctioned series to have a winless season champion when Dale Shaw won the then-Busch Grand National North Series championship without winning a single race all year. This happened again in 2025 when rookie Isaac Kitzmiller pulled off the same feat. The series had the distinction of being the only NASCAR series in which this had happened until 2013, when Austin Dillon won the Nationwide Series championship the same way. Matt Crafton and Andrés Pérez de Lara would also do this in the Truck Series in 2019 and ARCA Menards Series in 2024 respectively.

Over the next 18 years from 1987, the series extended its reach and added races in Delaware and Virginia. The series name was changed to Busch East for the 2006 season after a race was added in Greenville-Pickens Speedway in South Carolina. Races were added in South Boston, Virginia, and Nashville, Tennessee for 2007 to continue the push South and West, as well as East-West combination races at the Iowa Speedway in Newton, IA and Elko Speedway in Elko, MN. The 2008 schedule had the series running races in 8 states up and down the East coast. (Connecticut, Delaware, Iowa, New Hampshire, New York, Ohio, South Carolina, Tennessee and Virginia)

In 2012, NASCAR unified the rules of the NASCAR K&N Pro Series Invitational and North/East Series to a many rules package. A pre-season invitational race known as the Toyota All-Star Race was also added to pit the best drivers from both series head-to-head.

For 2013 NASCAR made several rule changes including giving teams the option of using "special" engines and a composite body to reduce the cost of competing in the K&N Series. The "spec" engine has become fairly popular, but the old style steel bodies are still preferred over the composite bodies by most teams.

On December 16, 2007, NASCAR announced that Camping World would take over as title sponsor of both series in the Grand National Division.

Starting in 2010, the names of both the East and West series were both sponsored by K&N Engineering and the East Series was named the K&N Pro Series East. In 2011, NASCAR lowered the age maximum across each of its regional touring series to 30.

In 2020, the series became part of the ARCA Menards Series banner and was renamed to the ARCA Menards Series East.

== Tracks ==
ARCA Menards Series East tracks in 2026
Points paying races

== Television broadcasting ==
Since 2024, the races have been streamed on FloRacing.

== ARCA Menards Series East cars ==
=== General ===
As part of NASCAR's unification of the two Camping World Series in 2003, the cars can be either a 105-inch (2,700 mm, which had been used in the former Busch Grand National East) or 110-inch (2,800 mm, which had been used in the former Winston West) wheelbase. Cambered/off-set rear ends are not allowed.

Currently, the series requires the use of a Five Star bodies composite body that started in the 2015 season, currently the 2013 Chevrolet SS, Ford Fusion, or Toyota Camry, as well as the Ford Mustang. Since the 2007 debut of the new chassis at the Cup and 2010 debut at the second-tier level, many ARCA East and West cars are former Cup or Xfinity cars.

Teams have an option of building their own engines or they may run a specification engine, similar to what is used at many short tracks. Both engines are V8, pushrod, 12:1 compression motors. "Built" motors are built to team specifications using any configuration of pieces as long as it still meets NASCAR specifications. The spec engine is built using NASCAR-approved pieces that may be purchased from an approved supplier. The engines may be purchased as a kit or pre-assembled. All of the spec pieces are individually encrypted with a barcode for verification and tracking purposes and can be checked during the inspection process with an encryption reader. NASCAR has a specification supplier for the series-specification engine.

When the series first started, the cars ran a V6 engine with a maximum 274 cu in (4,490 cm^{3}) displacement and no compression limit. In the early/mid 1990s the V8 engine with a 9.5:1 compression and maximum 358 cu in (5,870 cm^{3}) displacement was introduced to the series as an alternative to the V6 engines. Due to the decrease in popularity of the V6, it was phased out for the 1999 season. When the East and West series rules were combined, the compression ratio changed to 12:1.

Menards Series cars use Sunoco racing fuel, NASCAR's specification fuel. For races run with national series, the cars run an E15 blend since the national series uses such fuels. The cars use radial tires. Along with the rest of ARCA and NASCAR's international series, the Menards Series have General Tire as their exclusive tire supplier.

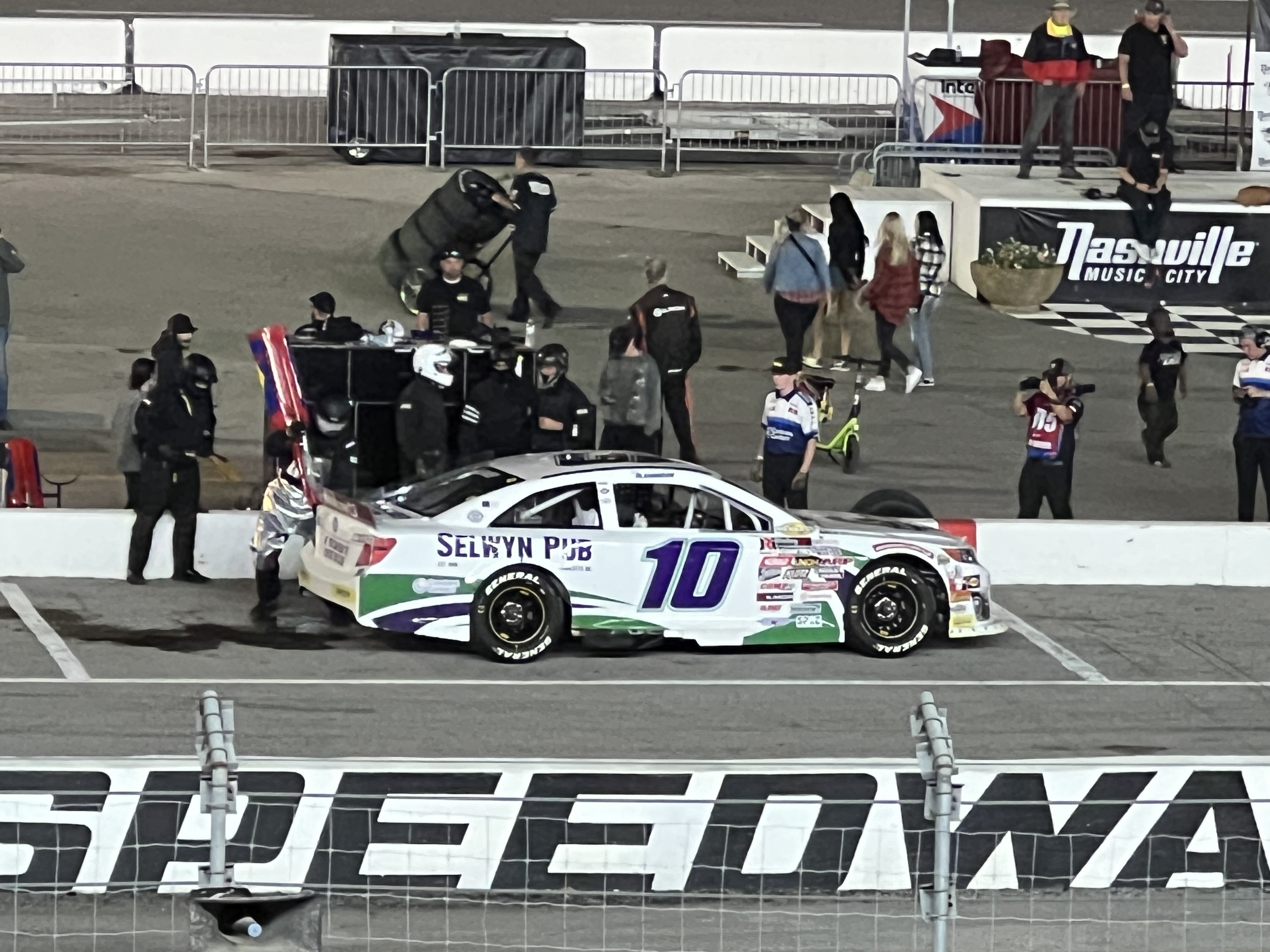
A current gen ARCA stock car.

On November 4, 2014 at the SEMA Show in Las Vegas, NASCAR president Mike Helton unveiled a new body style for the K&N Pro Series based on the NASCAR Cup Series Gen 6 models. The new body, developed with Five Star Race Car Bodies, is constructed of a composite laminate blend and designed with easily replaceable body panels, expected to shrink the costs of fabrication dramatically. The body style is eligible for use in both Menards Series competition and ARCA Racing Series competition, replacing the old Gen 4-style steel bodies after 2015, and the then-current one-piece composite body after 2016. The Ford Mustang was introduced in 2022 and has been used alongside the Fusion.

=== Specifications ===
- Engine displacement: 358 cu in (5.8 L) Pushrod V8.
- Transmission: 4 speed Manual.
- Weight: 3,300 lb (1,497 kg) Minimum (without driver).
- Power output: ~650 hp (485 kW) unrestricted.
- Fuel: Sunoco Leaded or Unleaded gasoline.
- Fuel capacity: 22 U.S. gallons (83.2 L).
- Fuel delivery: Carburetion.
- Compression ratio: 12:1.
- Aspiration: Naturally aspirated.
- Carburetor size: 390 cu ft/min (184 L/s) 4-barrel.
- Wheelbase: 105 in (2667 mm)/ 110 in (2794 mm).
- Steering: Power, recirculating ball.

== Seasons ==
Year	Champion	Most Popular Driver	Rookie of the Year
1987	Joey Kourafas	Chuck Bown	
1988	Jamie Aube	Dick McCabe	
1989	Jamie Aube (2)	Jamie Aube	Ron Lamell
1990	Jamie Aube (3)	Ricky Craven	Ricky Craven
1991	Ricky Craven	Ricky Craven (2)	Tony Hirschman Jr.
1992	Dick McCabe	Mike McLaughlin	Curtis Markham
1993	Dick McCabe (2)	Mike McLaughlin (2)	Andy Santerre
1994	Dale Shaw	Andy Santerre	Jerry Marquis
1995	Kelly Moore	Mike Stefanik	Brandon Butler
1996	Dave Dion	Brandon Butler	Brad Leighton
1997	Mike Stefanik	Mike Stefanik (2)	Tracy Gordon
1998	Mike Stefanik (2)	Mike Stefanik (3)	Jeff Taylor
1999	Brad Leighton	Dave Dion	Mike Bruno
2000	Brad Leighton (2)	Brad Leighton	Mike Johnson
2001	Mike Olsen	Mike Olsen	Brian Hoar
2002	Andy Santerre	Andy Santerre	Robbie Harrison
2003	Andy Santerre (2)	Andy Santerre (2)	Ryan Moore
2004	Andy Santerre (3)	Mike Stefanik (4)	Ryan Seaman
2005	Andy Santerre (4)	Andy Santerre (3)	Sean Caisse
2006	Mike Olsen (2)	Matt Kobyluck	Rubén Pardo
2007	Joey Logano	Jeffrey Earnhardt	Joey Logano
2008	Matt Kobyluck	Ricky Carmichael	Austin Dillon
2009	Ryan Truex	Steve Park	Ryan Truex
2010	Ryan Truex (2)	Ryan Truex	Bubba Wallace
2011	Max Gresham	Chase Elliott	Alex Bowman
2012	Kyle Larson	Chase Elliott (2)	Kyle Larson
2013	Dylan Kwasniewski	Ben Kennedy	Jesse Little
2014	Ben Rhodes	Ben Rhodes	Ben Rhodes
2015	William Byron	Rico Abreu	William Byron
2016	Justin Haley	Austin Theriault	Hunter Baize
2017	Harrison Burton		Chase Purdy
2018	Tyler Ankrum		Tyler Ankrum
2019	Sam Mayer		Sam Mayer
2020	Sam Mayer (2)		Ty Gibbs
2021	Sammy Smith		Sammy Smith
2022	Sammy Smith (2)		Leland Honeyman
2023	William Sawalich		William Sawalich
2024	William Sawalich (2)		Connor Zilisch
2025	Isaac Kitzmiller		Austin Vaughn
2026	Tristan McKee		Max Reaves

- Bold driver indicates that he/she has won at least 1 NASCAR Cup Series championship.
- Italicized driver indicates that he/she has won at least 1 NASCAR Xfinity Series championship.
- Bold and italicized driver indicates he/she has won both a NASCAR Xfinity Series and a NASCAR Camping World Truck Series championship (at least 1 of each).

== All-time win table ==
A total of 136 different drivers have scored wins in the series with Kelly Moore having the most with 27, followed by Brad Leighton who has 24 wins.

All figures correct as of the Bush's Best 200 at Bristol Motor Speedway (September 17, 2026).

Key
*	ARCA Menards Series East champion
#	Driver is competing full-time in the 2026 season
°	Driver is competing part-time in the 2026 season
^	Driver has been inducted into the NASCAR Hall of Fame

Rank	Driver	Wins
1	Kelly Moore*	27
2	Brad Leighton	24
3	Andy Santerre	23
4	Dale Shaw	19
5	Matt Kobyluck	16
6	Bobby Dragon	14
7	Dave Dion	13
8	Ricky Craven	12
8	Mike Stefanik	12
8	Tracy Gordon	12
11	Ted Christopher	10
11	Brett Moffitt	10
13	Jamie Aube	9
13	Sam Mayer	9
15	Mike Rowe	8
15	Dick McCabe	8
15	Robbie Crouch	8
15	Joe Bessey	8
15	Todd Gilliland	8
15	Sammy Smith*	8
21	Mike McLaughlin	7
21	Jerry Marquis	7
21	Tom Carey Jr.	7
21	Mike Johnson	7
21	Eddie MacDonald	7
21	Sean Caisse	7
21	William Sawalich*	7
28	Mike Olson	6
28	Dale Quarterley	6
28	Bubba Wallace	6
28	Corey LaJoie	6
28	Ty Gibbs	6
33	Bryan Wall	5
33	Martin Truex Jr.	5
33	Joey Logano	5
33	Ryan Truex	5
33	Sergio Peña	5
33	Dylan Kwasniewski	5
33	Austin Hill	5
33	Ben Rhodes	5
33	Harrison Burton	5
33	Max Reaves	5
43	Stub Fadden	4
43	Butch Leitzinger	4
43	Brian Ickler	4
43	Max Gresham	4
43	Scott Heckert	4
43	Kyle Benjamin	4
43	Tyler Ankrum	4
43	Connor Zilisch	4
43	Tristan McKee*	4
52	Joey Kourafas	3
52	Steve Park	3
52	Matt DiBenedetto	3
52	Daniel Suárez	3
52	Cole Custer	3
52	William Byron	3
52	Chase Cabre	3
52	Will Rodgers	3
52	Brent Crews	3
61	Billy Clark	2
61	Chuck Bown	2
61	Jimmy Spencer	2
61	Pete Silva	2
61	Larry Caron	2
61	Tom Bolles	2
61	Ryan Moore	2
61	Kyle Larson	2
61	Ben Kennedy	2
61	Brandon Jones	2
61	Tyler Dippel	2
61	Justin Haley	2
61	Austin Cindric	2
61	Spencer Davis	2
61	Noah Gragson	2
61	Rubén García Jr.	2
61	Derek Kraus	2
61	Luke Fenhaus	2
61	Brenden Queen	2
81	Bruce Haley	1
81	Mike Weeden	1
81	Tommy Houston	1
81	Ralph Nason	1
81	Richard Martin	1
81	Ken Bouchard	1
81	Bobby Gada	1
81	Tony Hirschman	1
81	Brian Ross	1
81	Ken Schrader	1
81	Martin Truex	1
81	John Preston	1
81	Glenn Sullivan	1
81	Keith Lamell	1
81	Tony Rosati	1
81	Jeff Fuller	1
81	Kip Stockwell	1
81	Rick Fuller	1
81	Kim Baker	1
81	Dennis Demers	1
81	Dennis Doyle	1
81	Joey McCarthy	1
81	Brian Hoar	1
81	Byron Chew	1
81	Tim Andrews	1
81	Rubin Pardo	1
81	Rogelio Lopez	1
81	Austin Dillon	1
81	Trevor Bayne	1
81	Aric Almirola	1
81	Peyton Sellers	1
81	Kyle Busch	1
81	Andrew Ranger	1
81	Ty Dillon	1
81	Nelson Piquet Jr.	1
81	Chase Elliott	1
81	Cole Conley	1
81	Tyler Reddick	1
81	Brandon Gdovic	1
81	Ryan Gifford	1
81	Jesse Little	1
81	Rico Abreu	1
81	Dillon Bassett	1
81	Chad Finchum	1
81	Ronnie Bassett Jr.	1
81	Travis Miller	1
81	Anthony Alfredo	1
81	Brandon McReynolds	1
81	Tanner Gray	1
81	Max McLaughlin	1
81	Max Gutierrez	1
81	Taylor Gray	1
81	Jake Finch	1
81	Jesse Love	1
81	Gio Ruggiero	1
81	Kaden Honeycutt	1
81	Carson Brown	1

== See also ==
- ARCA Menards Series
- ARCA Menards Series West
- List of NASCAR series
- List of auto racing tracks in the United States
