= Oxford Plains Speedway =

3/8 mile racetrack in Oxford, Maine, USA

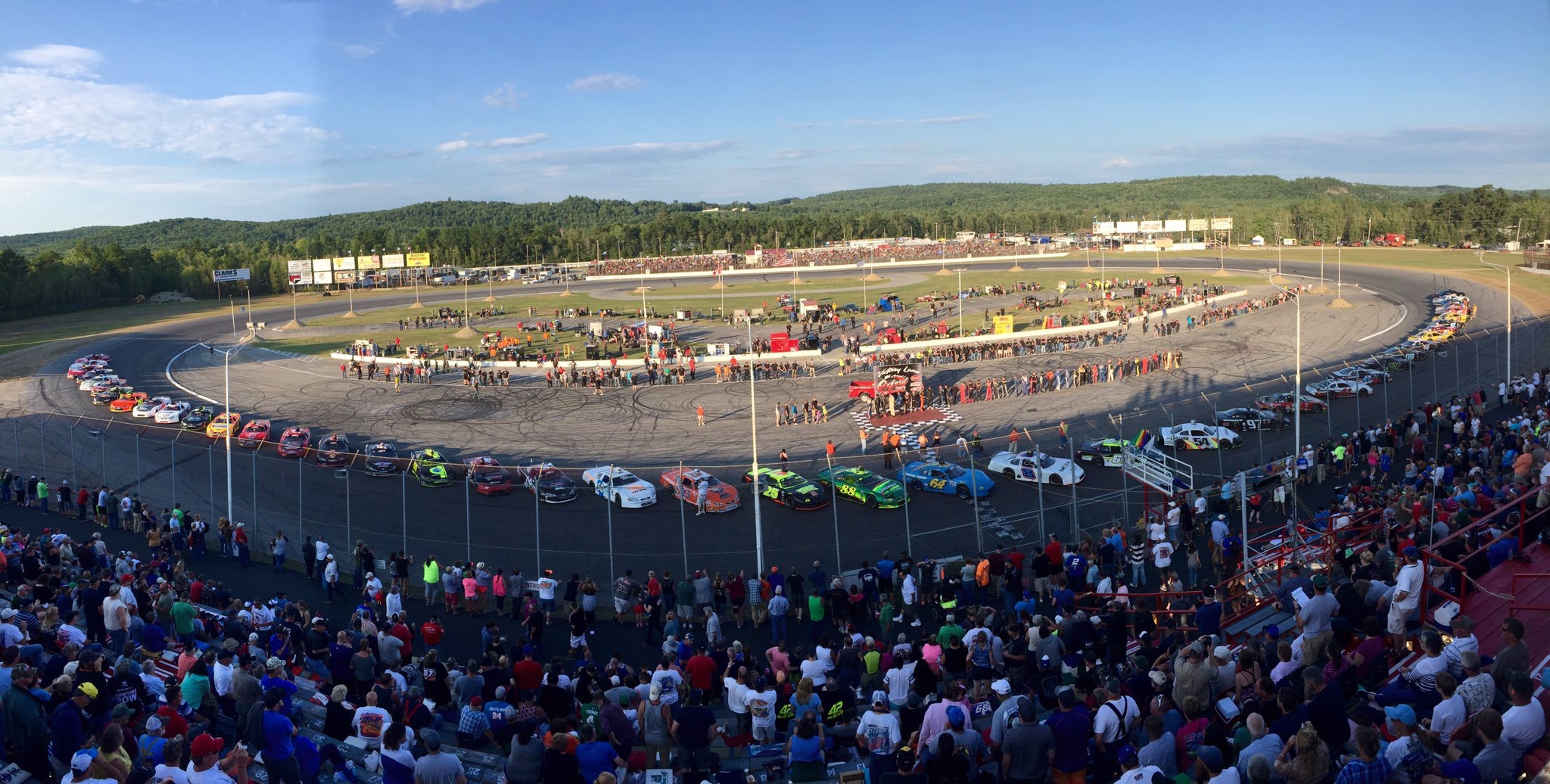
- Location: 877 Route 26; Oxford, Maine
- Coordinates: 44°9′13.70″N 70°29′4.45″W
- Capacity: 14,000
- Owner: Tom Mayberry (2012–present)
- Opened: 1950
- Major events: Current: NASCAR Whelen Modified Tour (1985–1988, 1991, 2026); American Canadian Tour (1980–1985, 2006–2012, 2015–2016, 2018–present); Former: NASCAR K&N Pro Series East (1987–1992, 2005); NASCAR Busch Grand National Series (1986–1988, 1990–1991); NASCAR Grand National Series (1966–1968)
- Website: http://www.oxfordplains.com
- Surface: Asphalt
- Length: 0.604 km (0.375 mi)
- Banking: 0° (straightaways); 9° (corners)

Oxford Plains Speedway is a 0.375 mi (0.604 km) racetrack located in Oxford, Maine. Known as "Maine’s Superspeedway," it hosts short-track racing tournaments and other events. The speedway is the largest spectator facility in the state of Maine, with seating for 14,000 people.

== Track operations ==
The speedway has the largest seating capacity of any sporting venue in Maine. The main race held there is the Bar Harbor Bank & Trust Oxford 250, which has run under various sanctions over the years; in the early 1990s, the race was a combination race between the NASCAR Busch Series and NASCAR Busch North Series, but it later became an American Canadian Tour Late Model race, and now a Pro All Star Series Super Late Model race. The 250 green flag lap race has often featured stars from NASCAR's three national series, even when it was not an Xfinity championship race in the early 1990s, as it is currently held during the NASCAR late-summer off week. Among the NASCAR stars who have raced the annual Oxford 250 are 17 drivers who have won NASCAR Cup Series majors, with eleven of them Sprint Cup Series champions, and five of those are now NASCAR Hall of Fame members.

The track is well known for its wide-open turns. It hosted three NASCAR Cup Series races between 1966 and 1968, with three of them won by Bobby Allison and the other by Richard Petty.

The speedway is also known around Maine for yearly hosting several Pro All Star Series races during the season, and for its motor mayhem events that include smokey doughnut shows, spectator drags, jack and jill races, enduros, and formally had the ramp jump that has been discontinued for safety reasons. The track offers racing twice weekly during the season. The Wednesday night Oxford Acceleration Series offers five divisions including Outlaws, Rebels, Sport Trucks, Cruisers and Ladies divisions. Saturday night Oxford Championship Series divisions include the headlining Super Late Models with Street Stocks, Bandits, Figure 8s as well as regional divisions that include Legends, North East Classic Lites, the Wicked Good Vintage Racing Association and the Pro All Star Series Modifieds.

== History ==
Construction of a new $35,000 racetrack in Oxford began on April 10, 1950 when bulldozers began demolition of foliage on the side of State Route 26 with Damon Brothers Lumber. The operator of the lumber company, George Damon, also served as President of the Pine State Stock Car Racing Association (PSSCRA). The sawmill in Norway, Maine would create the lumber necessary for the 600-foot (180 m) long grandstand, which would have capacity for 5,000 attendees, becoming the second-largest in the state. The track would be an oval of clay and gravel and have heavy banking for race car drivers. The new track would also have lights so night racing could be held. Damon was confident that the new track would be ready to open on May 30.

By May 26, the track was in place, along with the new grandstand and parking lot for 1,000 cars. Crews worked to finish the track for the opening race on May 27, 1950. Local time trials on May 21 found that the surface was dusty and an oil company was called in to help treat the surface to eliminate the dust. Officials from the PSSCRA, who sponsored the races that weekend, invited racers from several local groups to participate the races. The opening weekend would include four qualifying heat, a consolation race, two semi-final races and the main event.

The stadium held The Monsters of Rock Festival, featuring Van Halen, Scorpions, Dokken, Metallica and Kingdom Come on June 25, 1988. A show scheduled for the previous day was cancelled. The show brought in an estimated 40,000 people to the racetrack and caused traffic jams along Maine Route 26 to the Maine Turnpike.

The following week, the Grateful Dead performed, on two consecutive nights, at the racetrack on July 2–3, 1988, with Little Feat as their opening act, bringing in an estimated 140,000 people. Following traffic and crowd issues with the two concerts, the town of Oxford voted create a town ordinance to restrict crowd sizes at events in town to a maximum of 25,000 people.

In late 2012, the owner Bill Ryan sold the speedway to current owner Tom Mayberry. Since then there has been a change in the direction of the speedway, it no longer sanctions ACT-type Late Models as a weekly division, instead turning to Tom Mayberry's PASS (Pro All Star Series) Super Late Models which now serve as the weekly headliner. The Pro All Stars Series Super Late Model and Modified tours also make several stops at Oxford Plains during the racing season. The Oxford 250 is now a PASS Super Late Model race, with drivers across the continent who participate in Super Late Models under PASS, NASCAR, Champion Racing Association, Spears Southwest Tour, and other top Super Late Model series to use the same car they use in their home series, as most tracks with Super Late Models use a single set of rules for car specification.

In 2018, the American Canadian Tour made its return to Oxford Plains after an absence in 2017 with Eddie MacDonald sweeping both the events. ACT returned in 2019 with the Pro All Star Series and Oxford Plains season opener in May along with the Saturday night race before Oxford 250 Sunday in August. The Oxford 250 night before event will also feature Modified stock car racing from the Tri Track Modified Series.

== Super Late Model Track Championship ==
Year	Name	Number	Points
2013	T.J. Brackett	61	637
2014	T.J. Brackett	61	730
2015	Tim Brackett	60	822
2016	Tim Brackett	60	898
2017	Alan Tardiff	9T	830
2018	Gabe Brown	47	774
2019	Curtis Gerry	7G	835
2020	David Farrington Jr.	23	507
2021	David Farrington Jr.	23	939
2022	Max Cookson	39	846
2023	Max Cookson	39	684
2024	Trevor Sanborn	44	1646
2025	Scott McDaniel	14	1474
2026	Mike Rowe	24	1851

== Annual Oxford 250 Champions ==
Year	Name	Hometown	Winnings
1974	Joey Kourafas	Sharon, Massachusetts	$4,500
1975	Dave Dion	Hudson, New Hampshire	$4,500
1976	Butch Lindley	Greenville, South Carolina	$6,375
1977	Don Biederman	Oakville, Ontario	$6,000
1978	Bob Pressley	Asheville, North Carolina	$7,050
1979	Tom Rosati	Agawam, Massachusetts	$10,000
1980	Geoff Bodine	Chemung, New York	$11,200
1981	Geoff Bodine (2)	Chemung, New York	$21,400
1982	Mike Barry	Bolton, Vermont	$16,000
1983	Tommy Ellis	Richmond, Virginia	$21,150
1984	Mike Rowe	Turner, Maine	$26,475
1985	Dave Dion (2)	Hudson, New Hampshire	$26,600
1986	Chuck Bown	Portland, Oregon	$28,950
1987	Jamie Aube	North Ferrisburg, Vermont	$31,100
1988	Dick McCabe	Kennebunkport, Maine	$34,100
1989	Jamie Aube (2)	North Ferrisburg, Vermont	$35,075
1990	Chuck Bown (2) ^{NXS}	Portland, Oregon	$51,872
1991	Ricky Craven ^{NXS}	Newburgh, Maine	$50,025
1992	Dave Dion (3)	Hudson, New Hampshire	$37,150
1993	Junior Hanley	Campbellville, Ontario	$40,475
1994	Derek Lynch	Norwood, Ontario	$33,975
1995	Dave Whitlock	Petrolia, Ontario	$52,150
1996	Larry Gelinas	Scarborough, Maine	$50,000
1997	Mike Rowe (2)	Turner, Maine	$39,800
1998	Ralph Nason	Unity, Maine	$46,400
1999	Ralph Nason (2)	Unity, Maine	$42,700
2000	Ralph Nason (3)	Unity, Maine	$31,900
2001	Gary Drew	Windham, Maine	$35,400
2002	Scott Robins	Dixfield, Maine	$36,900
2003	Ben Rowe	Turner, Maine	$34,700
2004	Ben Rowe(2)	Turner, Maine	$29,700
2005	Mike Rowe (3)	Turner, Maine	$26,000
2006	Jeremie Whorff	Bath, Maine	$36,600
2007	Roger Brown	Lancaster, New Hampshire	$35,800
2008	Kevin Harvick	Bakersfield, California	$37,300
2009	Eddie MacDonald	Rowley, Massachusetts	$35,300
2010	Eddie MacDonald (2)	Rowley, Massachusetts	$29,800
2011	Kyle Busch	Las Vegas, Nevada	$31,800
2012	Joey Polewarczyk Jr.	Hudson, New Hampshire	$45,500
2013	Travis Benjamin	Morrill, Maine	$33,500
2014	Travis Benjamin (2)	Morrill, Maine	$27,300
2015	Glen Luce	Turner, Maine	$30,100
2016	Wayne Helliwell Jr.	Dover, New Hampshire	$29,500
2017	Curtis Gerry	Waterboro, Maine	$35,200
2018	Andrew (Bubba) Pollard	Senoia, Georgia	$28,000
2019	Travis Benjamin (3)	Morrill, Maine	$29,100
2020	Johnny Clark	Farmingdale, Maine	$32,676
2021	Cassius Clark	Farmington, Maine	$31,800
2022	Cole Butcher	Porter's Lake, Nova Scotia	$25,900
2023	Cole Butcher (2)	Porter's Lake, Nova Scotia	$27,700
2024	Jeff Taylor	Farmington, Maine	$26,700
2025	Austin Teras	Gray, Maine	$37,500
2026	Brandon Barker	Windham, Maine	
