= ARCA races at Lime Rock Park =

ARCA Menards Series races at Lime Rock Park

ARCA Menards Series
- Venue: Lime Rock Park
- Location: Lakeville, Connecticut, United States

Circuit information
- Surface: Asphalt
- Length: 1.530 mi (2.462 km)
- Turns: 7

Stock car racing events in the ARCA Menards Series have been held at Lime Rock Park, in Lakeville, Connecticut during numerous seasons and times of year since 1993.

== Current race ==
Lime Rock Park ARCA 100
ARCA Menards Series
- Venue: Lime Rock Park
- Location: Lakeville, Connecticut, United States
- First race: 2025
- Distance: 100.5 mi (161.74 km)
- Laps: 68
- Previous names: Lime Rock Park 100 (2025)
- Most wins (driver): Thomas Annunziata (2)
- Most wins (team): Nitro Motorsports (2)
- Most wins (manufacturer): Toyota (2)

Circuit information
- Surface: Asphalt
- Length: 1.530 mi (2.462 km)
- Turns: 7

The Lime Rock Park ARCA 100 is a race in the ARCA Menards Series that takes place at Lime Rock Park in Lakeville, Connecticut. The race was introduced for the 2025 season and would be held the same weekend as the NASCAR Craftsman Truck Series' LiUNA! 150. Thomas Annunziata is the defending race winner, winning in both runnings of the event.

=== History ===
On September 27, 2024, the 2025 schedule released announcing a race at Lime Rock. The event would mark the first time the series would compete in Connecticut, adding Lime Rock as the 181st different track in ARCA history. After spinning in the first lap, Thomas Annunziata would earn his first career victory. Annunziata also won in 2026.

=== Past winners ===
Year	Date	No.	Driver	Team	Manufacturer	Race Distance		Race Time	Average Speed (mph)	Report	Ref
Year	Date	No.	Driver	Team	Manufacturer	Laps	Miles (km)	Race Time	Average Speed (mph)	Report	Ref
2025	June 28	70	Thomas Annunziata	Nitro Motorsports	Toyota	68	104.040 (167.436)	1:24:1	71.547	Report	
2026	July 10	70	Thomas Annunziata	Nitro Motorsports	Toyota	68	104.040 (167.436)	1:21:1	74.173	Report	

== Former ARCA East race ==
K&N 100
ARCA Menards Series East
- Venue: Lime Rock Park
- Location: Lakeville, Connecticut, United States
- First race: 1993
- Last race: 2010
- Distance: 100.5 mi (161.74 km)
- Laps: 66
- Previous names: Lime Rock 50 (1993); GMC Trucks 200 (1994); Dodge Dealers 200 (1995, 2000); Dodge Dealers 200K (1996–1999); Burnham Boilers 200 (2001–2003); Busch North 200 (2004); Burnham Hydronics 200 (2005); Mohegan Sun 200 (2006, 2009); Mohegan Sun NASCAR Busch East 200 (2007); Mohegan Sun NASCAR Camping World 200 (2008); K&N 100 (2010)
- Most wins (driver): Butch Leitzinger; Matt Kobyluck (3)
- Most wins (team): Leitzinger Racing; Kobyluck Enterprises (3)
- Most wins (manufacturer): Chevrolet (10)

Circuit information
- Surface: Asphalt
- Length: 1.530 mi (2.462 km)
- Turns: 7

The K&N 100 was a race in the ARCA Menards Series East that took place at Lime Rock Park in Lakeville, Connecticut. Andrew Ranger was the final winner of the event.

=== Past winners ===
Year	Date	No.	Driver	Team	Manufacturer	Race Distance		Race Time	Average speed (mph)	Report	Ref
Year	Date	No.	Driver	Team	Manufacturer	Laps	Miles (km)	Race Time	Average speed (mph)	Report	Ref
1993	October 16	52	Ken Schrader	N/A	Chevrolet	50	76.500 (123.115)	0:54:19	84.504	Report	
1994	October 15	91	Butch Leitzinger	Leitzinger Racing	Ford	82	125.460 (201.908)	1:38:57	75.616	Report	
1995	November 4	91	Butch Leitzinger	Leitzinger Racing	Ford	83	126.990 (204.371)	1:37:20	78.202	Report	
1996	October 12	91	Butch Leitzinger	Leitzinger Racing	Ford	87*	133.110 (214.220)	2:03:10	64.844	Report	
1997	October 18	13	Ted Christopher	James Lestorti	Chevrolet	82	125.460 (201.908)	1:48:55	69.113	Report	
1998	October 17	51	Mike Stefanik	Mike Greci	Chevrolet	82	125.460 (201.908)	1:46:53	72.420	Report	
1999	October 16	77	Bryan Wall	N/A	Ford	84*	128.520 (206.833)	1:39:17	77.669	Report	
2000	October 14	77	Bryan Wall	N/A	Ford	82	125.460 (201.908)	1:47:28	70.046	Report	
2001	October 13	32	Dale Quarterley	1/4 Ley Racing	Chevrolet	82	125.460 (201.908)	1:42:18	73.584	Report	
2002	October 26	30	Dennis Doyle	N/A	Chevrolet	63*	96.390 (155.125)	1:45:00	55.080	Report	
2003	October 11	32	Dale Quarterley	1/4 Ley Racing	Chevrolet	82	125.460 (201.908)	1:47:57	69.739	Report	
2004	May 29	35	Brad Leighton	N/A	Ford	82	125.460 (201.908)	1:48:37	69.304	Report	
2005	October 1	40	Matt Kobyluck	Kobyluck Enterprises	Chevrolet	82	125.460 (201.908)	1:45:58	69.645	Report	
2006	September 30	12	Rubén Pardo	FitzContreras Racing	Dodge	82	125.460 (201.908)	1:41:56	73.845	Report	
2007	August 18	40	Matt Kobyluck	Kobyluck Enterprises	Chevrolet	82	125.460 (201.908)	2:01:24	62.007	Report	
2008	August 16	40	Matt Kobyluck	Kobyluck Enterprises	Chevrolet	82	125.460 (201.908)	1:15:48	99.309	Report	
2009	August 15	00	Ryan Truex	Michael Waltrip Racing	Toyota	86*	131.580 (211.757)	1:40:18	78.712	Report	
2010	July 3	35	Andrew Ranger	NDS Motorsports	Chevrolet	66	100.980 (162.512)	1:14:06	80.162	Report	

- Note: 1996, 1999, and 2009 race extended due to green–white–checker finish.

Previous race: Ashley Furniture 150	ARCA Menards Series; Lime Rock Park ARCA 100	Next race: JR & CO. 150
