= Oxoboxo River, Connecticut =

Census-designated place in Connecticut, United States

- Census-designated place
- Location in New London County, Connecticut

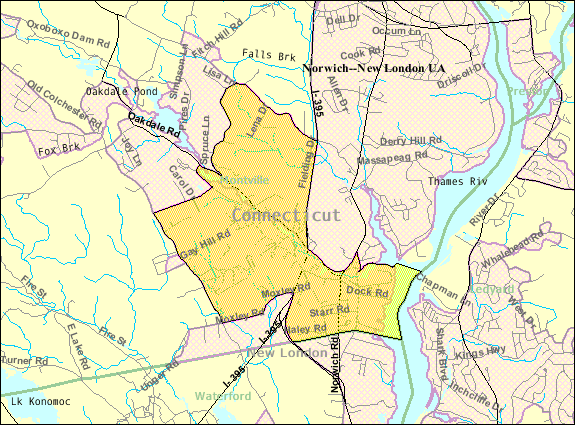
- Census Bureau map of the CDP
- Coordinates: 41°26′23″N 72°07′08″W
- Country: United States
- State: Connecticut
- County: New London
- Town: Montville

Area
  - Total: 4.5 sq mi (11.6 km^{2})
  - Land: 4.2 sq mi (11.0 km^{2})
  - Water: 0.23 sq mi (0.6 km^{2})
- Elevation: 138 ft (42 m)

Population (2020)
  - Total: 2,955
  - Density: 696/sq mi (269/km^{2})
- Time zone: UTC−5 (Eastern (EST))
  - Summer (DST): UTC−4 (EDT)
- ZIP code: 06382
- Area code: 860
- FIPS code: 09-58520
- GNIS feature ID: 2377849

Oxoboxo River (/ˈɑːksoʊˌbɑːksoʊ/) is a census-designated place (CDP) in the town of Montville in New London County, Connecticut, United States. The population was 2,938 at the 2000 census, 3,165 at the 2010 census, and 2,955 at the 2020 census. The statistical area encompasses the town center of Montville, as well as the adjacent villages of Palmertown and Uncasville. The name of the statistical area is from the river of the same name running through the CDP.

The U.S. Postal Service includes the entire area of the CDP in ZIP code 06382, for which the USPS uses "Uncasville" as the place name. The Uncasville ZIP code also encompasses the Mohegan reservation, including the Mohegan Sun casino complex, and other parts of Montville.

== Geography ==
The CDP takes its name from the Oxoboxo River, a tributary of the Thames River that flows through the CDP. According to the United States Census Bureau, the CDP has a total area of 11.6 km^{2} (4.5 mi^{2}), of which 11.0 km^{2} (4.3 mi^{2}) is land and 0.6 km^{2} (0.2 mi^{2}) (5.1%) is water.

== Demographics ==
=== 2020 census ===
As of the 2020 census, Oxoboxo River had a population of 2,955. The median age was 49.9 years. 16.3% of residents were under the age of 18 and 25.5% of residents were 65 years of age or older. For every 100 females there were 94.9 males, and for every 100 females age 18 and over there were 95.0 males age 18 and over.

92.7% of residents lived in urban areas, while 7.3% lived in rural areas.

There were 1,442 households in Oxoboxo River, of which 19.7% had children under the age of 18 living in them. Of all households, 39.7% were married-couple households, 26.4% were households with a male householder and no spouse or partner present, and 25.4% were households with a female householder and no spouse or partner present. About 37.7% of all households were made up of individuals and 17.7% had someone living alone who was 65 years of age or older.

There were 1,549 housing units, of which 6.9% were vacant. The homeowner vacancy rate was 1.5% and the rental vacancy rate was 7.1%.

Racial composition as of the 2020 census
Race	Number	Percent
White	2,399	81.2%
Black or African American	93	3.1%
American Indian and Alaska Native	52	1.8%
Asian	84	2.8%
Native Hawaiian and Other Pacific Islander	5	0.2%
Some other race	89	3.0%
Two or more races	233	7.9%
Hispanic or Latino (of any race)	220	7.4%

=== 2000 census ===
As of the census of 2000, there were 2,938 people, 1,245 households, and 776 families residing in the CDP. The population density was 266.3/km^{2} (689.6/mi^{2}). There were 1,356 housing units at an average density of 122.9/km^{2} (318.3/mi^{2}). The racial makeup of the CDP was 90.50% White, 1.60% African American, 1.29% Native American, 2.55% Asian, 1.09% from other races, and 2.96% from two or more races. Hispanic or Latino of any race were 3.51% of the population.

There were 1,245 households, out of which 26.3% had children under the age of 18 living with them, 46.0% were married couples living together, 11.5% had a female householder with no husband present, and 37.6% were non-families. 31.6% of all households were made up of individuals, and 12.6% had someone living alone who was 65 years of age or older. The average household size was 2.34 and the average family size was 2.95.

In the CDP, the population was spread out, with 23.0% under the age of 18, 7.3% from 18 to 24, 28.5% from 25 to 44, 24.6% from 45 to 64, and 16.7% who were 65 years of age or older. The median age was 40 years. For every 100 females, there were 102.1 males. For every 100 females age 18 and over, there were 99.2 males.

The median income for a household in the CDP was $43,714, and the median income for a family was $51,987. Males had a median income of $37,775 versus $29,028 for females. The per capita income for the CDP was $23,310. About 5.3% of families and 6.4% of the population were below the poverty line, including 10.5% of those under age 18 and 6.6% of those age 65 or over.

== Education ==
The census-designated place, along with the rest of Montville Town, is in Montville School District.
