= 2009 NASCAR Camping World East Series =

23rd season of NASCAR's Camping World East Series

Seasons
- ← 2008 2010 →

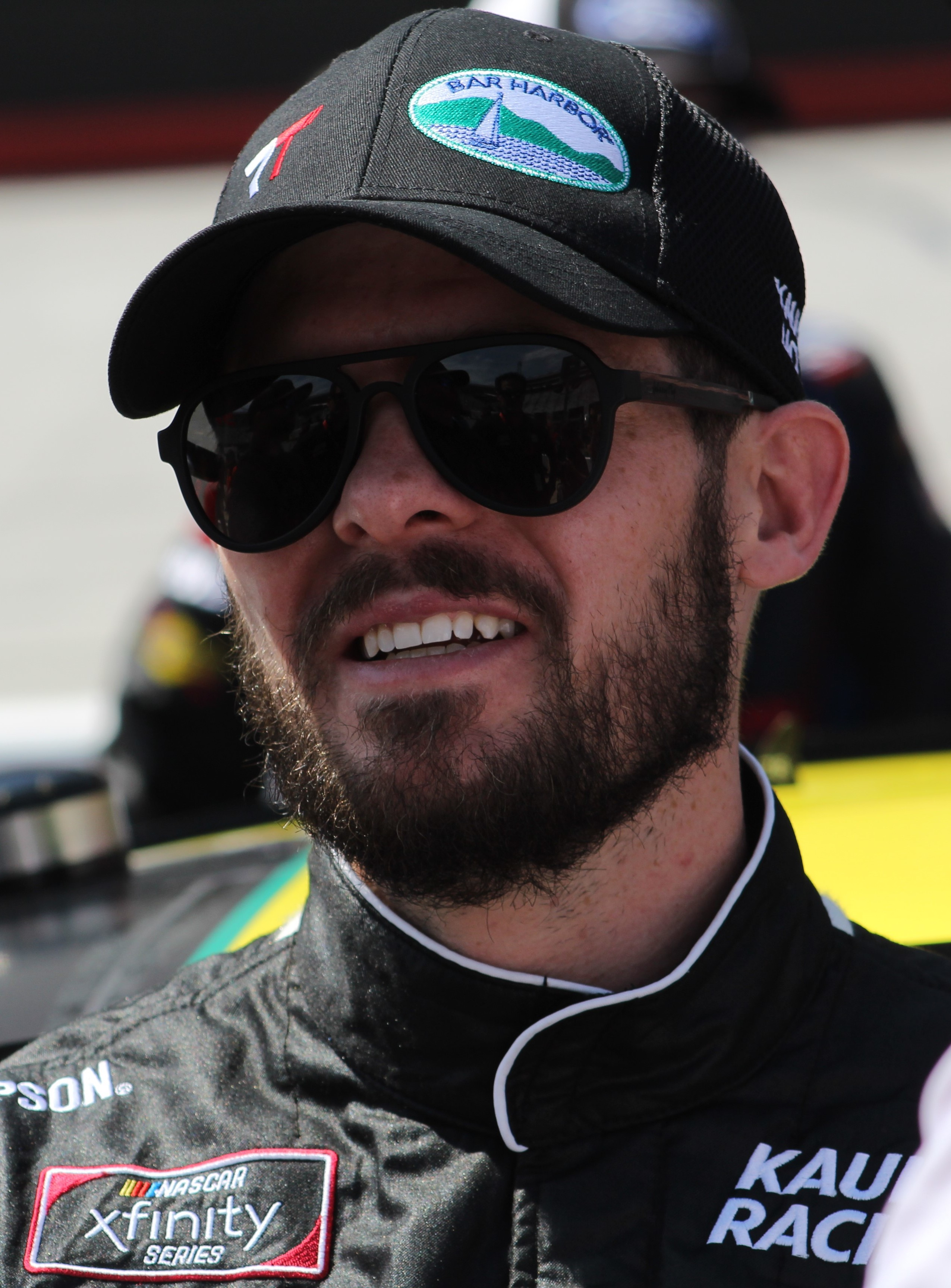
Ryan Truex, the 2009 Camping World East Series champion, pictured in 2018, was the first of his two consecutive titles.

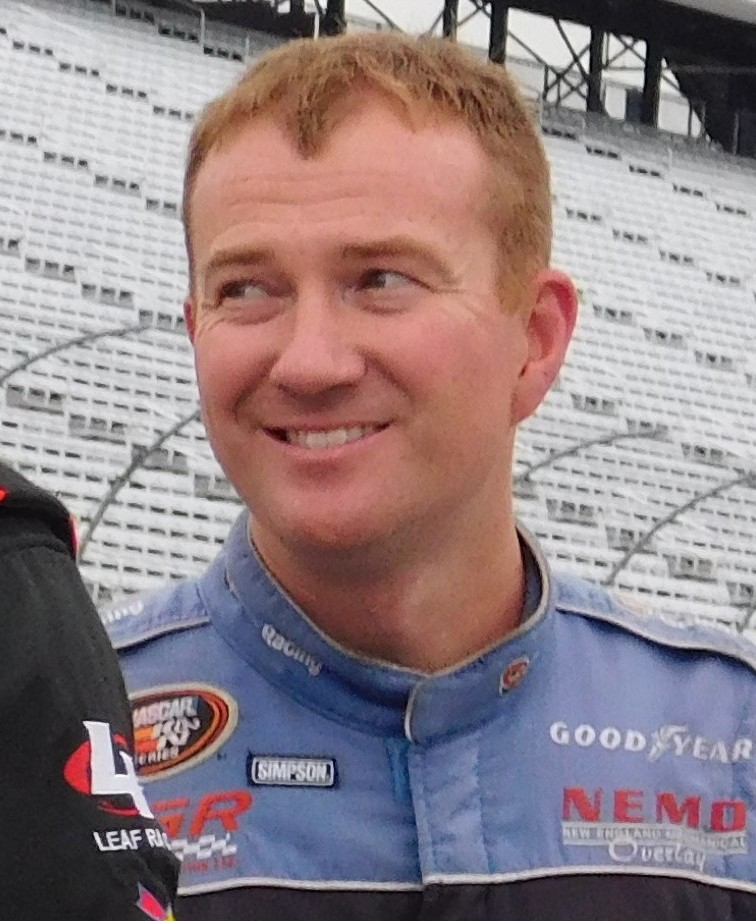
Eddie MacDonald, pictured in 2017, finished second in the championship behind Truex by 34 points.

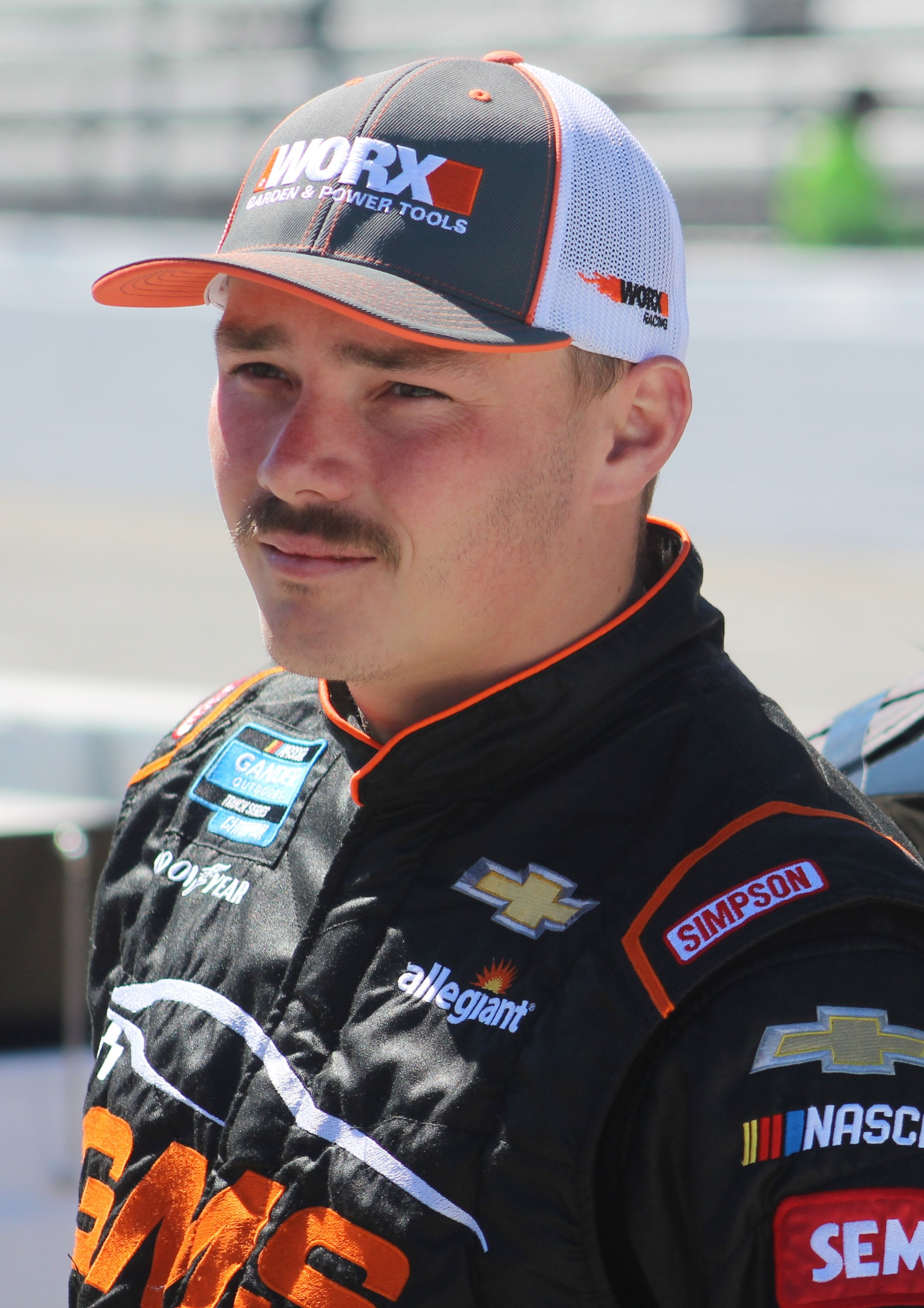
Brett Moffitt, pictured in 2019, driving the No. 44 car for Andy Santerre, finished third in the championship.

The 2009 NASCAR Camping World East Series was the 23rd season of the Camping World East Series, a touring series sanctioned by NASCAR. Matt Kobyluck entered the season as the defending drivers' champion. Ryan Truex won the championship, 34 points in front of Eddie MacDonald.

This was the last season for the East Series with the Camping World title sponsorship. Because Camping World decided to be the title sponsor for the NASCAR Truck Series starting in 2009, they did not renew their title sponsorship of NASCAR's East and West Series after their contract for that ended at the end of the 2009 season. (So, they sponsored all three series for that year only.) K&N Filters became the new title sponsor for the East and West Series starting in 2010.

== Schedule ==
The schedule was announced on December 24, 2008 with eleven races at ten different tracks. The series lost three tracks from last year's schedule (Stafford Motor Speedway, Music City Motorplex and Mansfield Motorsports Park) but gains one new track for this season (Tri-County Motor Speedway). The Tennessee State Fairgrounds was initially on the schedule but changes in management of the track (new management decided to eliminate NASCAR sanction) resulted in the loss of the event.

For the fourth year in a row, the regular season began at Greenville-Pickens Speedway on April 11. The series made its first appearance at Tri-County Motor Speedway two weeks later on April 25 before heading to Iowa for the series' third appearance at Iowa Speedway. The Iowa race was a combination East/West race where drivers from both series will compete against each other. Drivers are awarded points based on their finishing position against drivers in their series. (i.e. Highest finishing driver in the East gets first place points and the highest finishing driver in the West gets first place points)

Traditional stops at New Hampshire Motor Speedway, Thompson International Speedway, Adirondack International Speedway, and Lime Rock Park fill up the bulk of the summer schedule before the regular season finale at Dover International Speedway on September 25.

On March 16, 2009, NASCAR announced that Speed Channel would broadcast each race as part of a one-hour special that would air on Thursdays at 3 p.m. ET.

The 2009 season Toyota All-Star Showdown was held on January 30, 2010, and was televised on Speed Channel.

No.	Race title	Track	Date	TV
1	NASCAR Home Tracks 150 presented by Kevin Whitaker Chevrolet	Greenville-Pickens Speedway, Greenville, South Carolina	April 11	Speed
2	NASCAR Camping World Series East-Tri-County 150	Tri-County Motor Speedway, Granite Falls, North Carolina	April 25	Speed
3	Long John Silver's 200	Iowa Speedway, Newton, Iowa	May 17	Speed
4	South Boston 150	South Boston Speedway, South Boston, Virginia	May 30	Speed
5	Tioga Downs Casino 125	Watkins Glen International, Watkins Glen, New York	June 6	Speed
6	Heluva Good! Summer 125	New Hampshire Motor Speedway, Loudon, New Hampshire	June 26	Speed
7	Pepsi Full Fender Frenzy 100	Thompson International Speedway, Thompson, Connecticut	July 11	Speed
8	The Edge Hotel 150 presented by Casella Waste Systems	Adirondack International Speedway, New Bremen, New York	August 1	Speed
9	Mohegan Sun 200	Lime Rock Park, Lakeville, Connecticut	August 15	Speed
10	Heluva Good! Fall 125	New Hampshire Motor Speedway, Loudon, New Hampshire	September 18	Speed
11	Sunoco 150	Dover International Speedway, Dover, Delaware	September 25	Speed
	2009 Toyota All-Star Showdown ^{2}	Toyota Speedway at Irwindale, Irwindale, California	January 30, 2010	Speed

^{1} All races will air tape-delayed on Speed Channel on Thursdays at 3pm ET ^{2} Non-points event. This race airs live on Speed Channel.

== 2009 Series Races ==
=== NASCAR Home Tracks 150 presented by Kevin Whitaker Chevrolet ===
The NASCAR Home Tracks 150 presented by Kevin Whitaker Chevrolet was held at Greenville-Pickens Speedway on April 11.

Brian Ickler is hoping to use the NASCAR Camping World Series East as a launching pad. Performances like Saturday night at historic Greenville Pickens Speedway certainly don’t hurt his cause, as Ickler led nearly every lap from start to finish in winning the season-opening.

Ickler recorded his fourth career NASCAR Camping World Series East victory and seventh NASCAR Camping World Series victory overall.

Veteran Jody Lavender scored a career-best second-place finish, while Eddie MacDonald finished third. Josh Richards and Brett Moffitt, both making their first career NASCAR starts, rounded out the top five.

Ickler qualified second behind pole position winner Moffitt. A multi-car accident in Turn 1 on the start of the race caused a lengthy red flag before the end of the first lap. NASCAR decided to reset the lineup of the field with the exception of those cars involved in the accident and do a complete restart of the event. Several cars came into the pits to repair damage and would have to start at the rear of the field since they were considered to have pitted before the initial green flag. On the second attempt at the start, Ickler got the jump on Moffitt and quickly began to pull away from the field.

MacDonald, restarting on the outside of the front row, briefly took the lead by a nose on two restarts. Each time however, Ickler erased the lead and pulled out to a commanding lead. Ickler led four times for 146 laps. In addition, the victory gave Ickler a secured spot in the postseason NASCAR Toyota All-Star Showdown - a spot reserved for winners of the NASCAR Camping World Series events in 2009.

Official Results
Finish	Start	Car #	Driver	Hometown	Car	Laps	Reason Out
1	2	15	Brian Ickler	San Diego, Calif.	Chevrolet	150	
2	13	88	Jody Lavender	Hartsville, S.C.	Chevrolet	150	
3	3	71	Eddie MacDonald	Rowley, Mass.	Chevrolet	150	
4	17	52	Josh Richards	Shinnston, W.Va.	Chevrolet	150	
5	1	44	Brett Moffitt	Grimes, Iowa	Chevrolet	150	
6	9	03	Patrick Long	Oak Park, Calif.	Chevrolet	150	
7	4	35	Steve Park	East Northport, N.Y.	Chevrolet	150	
8	8	40	Matt Kobyluck	Uncasville, Conn.	Chevrolet	150	
9	12	38	Alan Tardiff	Windham, Maine	Chevrolet	150	
10	6	18	Matt DiBenedetto	Grass Valley, Calif.	Toyota	150	
11	20	17	Jason Patison	Corona, Calif.	Chevrolet	150	
12	7	4	Dakoda Armstrong	New Castle, Ind.	Chevrolet	149	
13	22	39	Dustin Delaney	Mayfield, N.Y.	Chevrolet	149	
14	5	00	Ryan Truex	Mayetta, N.J.	Toyota	149	
15	10	7	Ryan Duff	Hazard, KY	Chevrolet	148	
16	24	50	Todd Peck	Glenville, Pa.	Chevrolet	148	
17	18	37	Alex Kennedy	Aztek, NM	Chevrolet	146	
18	23	58	Richard Gould	North Brunswick, N.J.	Chevrolet	142	
19	19	16	Jonathan Smith	Beacon Fals, Conn.	Chevrolet	137	Vibration
20	28	10	Matt Kurzejewski	Mansfield, Pa.	Dodge	132	Accident
21	26	30	Jeff Anton	Russell, Mass.	Chevrolet	131	Accident
22	16	94	Kristin Bumbera	Sealy, Texas	Dodge	110	Accident
23	27	63	John Salemi	Nashua, N.H.	Chevrolet	108	Oil Line
24	14	23	Jarit Johnson	El Cajon, Calif.	Dodge	107	Overheating
25	15	12	Jesus Hernandez	Fresno, Calif.	Dodge	55	Accident
26	21	26	Scott Bouley	Thomaston, Conn.	Chevrolet	43	Rear End
27	25	72	Jason Cochran	Marion, N.C.	Chevrolet	34	Brakes
28	11	11	Tom Hessert III	Cherry Hill, N.J.	Ford	0	Accident
29	29	1	Dominick Casola	Holmdel, N.J.	Ford	0	Accident

Fastest Qualifier: Brett Moffitt, Time: 20.691 Seconds, Speed: 86.994 mph (140.003 km/h)

Time of Race: 1 hrs., 22 mins, 9 seconds

Margin of Victory: 0.951 Seconds

Average race speed: 54.778 mph (88.157 km/h)

Cautions: Laps 11-13; 45-48; 99-103; 106-111; 113-118; 129-132; 135-141; 144-146. 8 for 38 laps.

Lead changes: 6 changes involving 2 drivers

Lap Leaders: Ickler 1-48, MacDonald 49, Ickler 50-111, MacDonald 112, Ickler 113-118, MacDonald 119-120, Ickler 121-150.

Total Laps Lead: Brian Ickler 146, Eddie MacDonald 4

Did not Qualify: None

Top 10 Driver Points: Brian Ickler 190, Jody Lavender 170, Eddie MacDonald 170, Josh Richards 160, Brett Moffitt * 155, Patrick Long 150, Steve Park 146, Matt Kobyluck 142, Alan Tardiff 138, Matt DiBenedetto 134

=== NASCAR Camping World Series East-Tri-County 150 ===
The NASCAR Camping World Series East-Tri-County 150 was held at Tri-County Motor Speedway on April 25.

Matt DiBenedetto took just two starts to find Victory Lane.

The 17-year-old Grass Valley, Calif., driver passed Austin Dillon on a back-and-forth battle following a green-white-checkered finish to Saturday night’s Tri-County 150 to earn his first career NASCAR Camping World Series East victory.

DiBenedetto, a Joe Gibbs Racing development driver, and Dillon, a Richard Childress Racing development driver, swapped the lead six times over the second half of the race. The event was stretched to 165 laps due to a pair of late cautions. DiBenedetto led four times for 75 laps, while Dillon led three times for 15 laps.

On the final restart, Dillon got the jump from the second spot to take the lead. DiBenedetto, however, was able to nose underneath as they came to the white flag and took the lead going into Turn 1 of the final lap.

Rookie Alan Tardiff earned his first Coors Light Pole Award earlier in the day and brought home his best finish with a third-place run. Jody Lavender took over the points lead with a fourth-place finish, while Patrick Long rounded out the top five.

Official Results
Finish	Start	Car #	Driver	Team	Laps	Points/Bonus Points	Reason Out
1	3	18	Matt DiBenedetto	Toyota	165	190/10	
2	4	3	Austin Dillon	Chevrolet	165	175/5	
3	1	38	Alan Tardiff *	Chevrolet	165	170/5	
4	10	88	Jody Lavender	Chevrolet	165	160	
5	9	03	Patrick Long	Chevrolet	165	155	
6	2	9	Trevor Bayne	Chevrolet	165	150	
7	7	4	Dakoda Armstrong *	Chevrolet	165	146	
8	16	7	Ryan Duff	Chevrolet	165	142	
9	15	39	Dustin Delaney	Chevrolet	165	138	
10	6	40	Matt Kobyluck	Chevrolet	165	139/5	
11	22	17	Jason Patison	Chevrolet	165	130	
12	8	71	Eddie MacDonald	Chevrolet	165	127	
13	19	52	Kyle Fowler	Chevrolet	165	124	
14	21	37	Alex Kennedy	Chevrolet	165	121	
15	13	35	Steve Park	Chevrolet	165	118	
16	20	00	Ryan Truex *	Toyota	165	115	
17	14	29	Ryan Gifford	Chevrolet	165	112	
18	11	63	John Salemi	Chevrolet	165	109	
19	24	12	Antonio Pérez	Dodge	164	106	
20	23	61	Dominick Casola *	Chevrolet	164	103	
21	12	72	Jason Cochran *	Chevrolet	164	100	
22	17	16	Jonathan Smith	Chevrolet	163	97	
23	5	44	Brett Moffitt *	Chevrolet	162	94	
24	26	94	Kristin Bumbera *	Dodge	162	91	
25	25	10	Matt Kurzejewski *	Dodge	147	88	Accident
26	18	23	Jarit Johnson *	Chevrolet	130	85	Engine

Fastest Qualifier: Alan Tardiff *, 86.946 mph (139.926 km/h), 16.562 seconds

Time of Race: 1 hour 8 minutes 43 seconds

Margin of Victory: .340 seconds

Average Speed: 90.833 mph (146.182 km/h)

Lead changes: 8 among 4 drivers

Cautions: 8 for 43 laps

Lap Leaders: A. Tardiff 1-16; M. Kobyluck 17-75; M. DiBenedetto 76-101; A. Dillon 102-113; M. DiBenedetto 114-146; A. Dillon 147; M. DiBenedetto 148-162; A. Dillon 163-164; M. DiBenedetto 165

Laps Lead: Matt DiBenedetto 75, Matt Kobyluck 59, Alan Tardiff * 16, Austin Dillon 15

Standings: 1. J. Lavender, 330; 2. M. DiBenedetto, 324; 3. A. Tardiff, 308; 4. P. Long, 305; 5. E. MacDonald, 297; 6. M. Kobyluck, 281; 7. D. Armstrong, 273; 8. S. Park, 264; 9. D. Delaney, 262; 10. R. Duff, 260

Did not Qualify: None

== See also ==
- 2009 NASCAR Sprint Cup Series
- 2009 NASCAR Nationwide Series
- 2009 NASCAR Camping World Truck Series
- 2009 ARCA Re/Max Series
- 2009 NASCAR Camping World West Series
- 2009 NASCAR Whelen Modified Tour
- 2009 NASCAR Whelen Southern Modified Tour
- 2009 NASCAR Canadian Tire Series
- 2009 NASCAR Corona Series
- 2009 NASCAR Mini Stock Series
