= Montville High School =

Montville High School may be:

- Montville High School (Connecticut) in Montville, Connecticut
- Montville Township High School in Montville, New Jersey
