= Charles Comstock =

Charles Comstock may refer to:

- Charles C. Comstock, American businessman and politician from Michigan
- Charles W. Comstock, American attorney and judge
