= General Tire 100 =

General Tire 100 may refer to several ARCA Menards Series races:

- General Tire 100, a race at Daytona International Speedway, held in 2020
- General Tire 100 at The Glen, a race at Watkins Glen International, first held in 1993
