= Music City 150 =

ARCA race at Nashville Fairgrounds Speedway

ARCA Menards Series East
- Venue: Nashville Fairgrounds Speedway
- Location: Nashville, Tennessee
- First race: 1992
- Distance: 89.400 mi (143.875 km)
- Laps: 150
- Previous names: Nashville 200 (1992); Music City 150 (2007, 2024-present); Strutmasters.com 150 presented by Dollar General (2008); Troop Aid 200 (2015); Music City 200 (2016–2020, 2022–2023); Crosley Record Pressing 200 (2021); Music City 150 (2024–2025)
- Most wins (driver): Sammy Smith; Max Reaves (2)
- Most wins (team): Joe Gibbs Racing (4)
- Most wins (manufacturer): Chevrolet (7)

Circuit information
- Length: 0.596 mi (0.959 km)
- Turns: 4

The Music City 150, (currently called the Cook Out Music City 150 for sponsorship reasons) is an 89.4-mile (143.9 km) annual ARCA Menards Series East race held at the Nashville Fairgrounds Speedway in Nashville, Tennessee. The event has been part of the ARCA Menards Series and ARCA Menards Series East (previously the NASCAR Busch and Camping World East Series) schedules and has come and gone from both throughout its history. It was originally held in 1992 in what was then known as the ARCA SuperCar Series, brought back in 2007 and 2008 as an East Series race, brought back in 2015 as an ARCA Racing (later Menards) Series race, and then moved back to the East Series after NASCAR's acquisition of ARCA.

== History ==
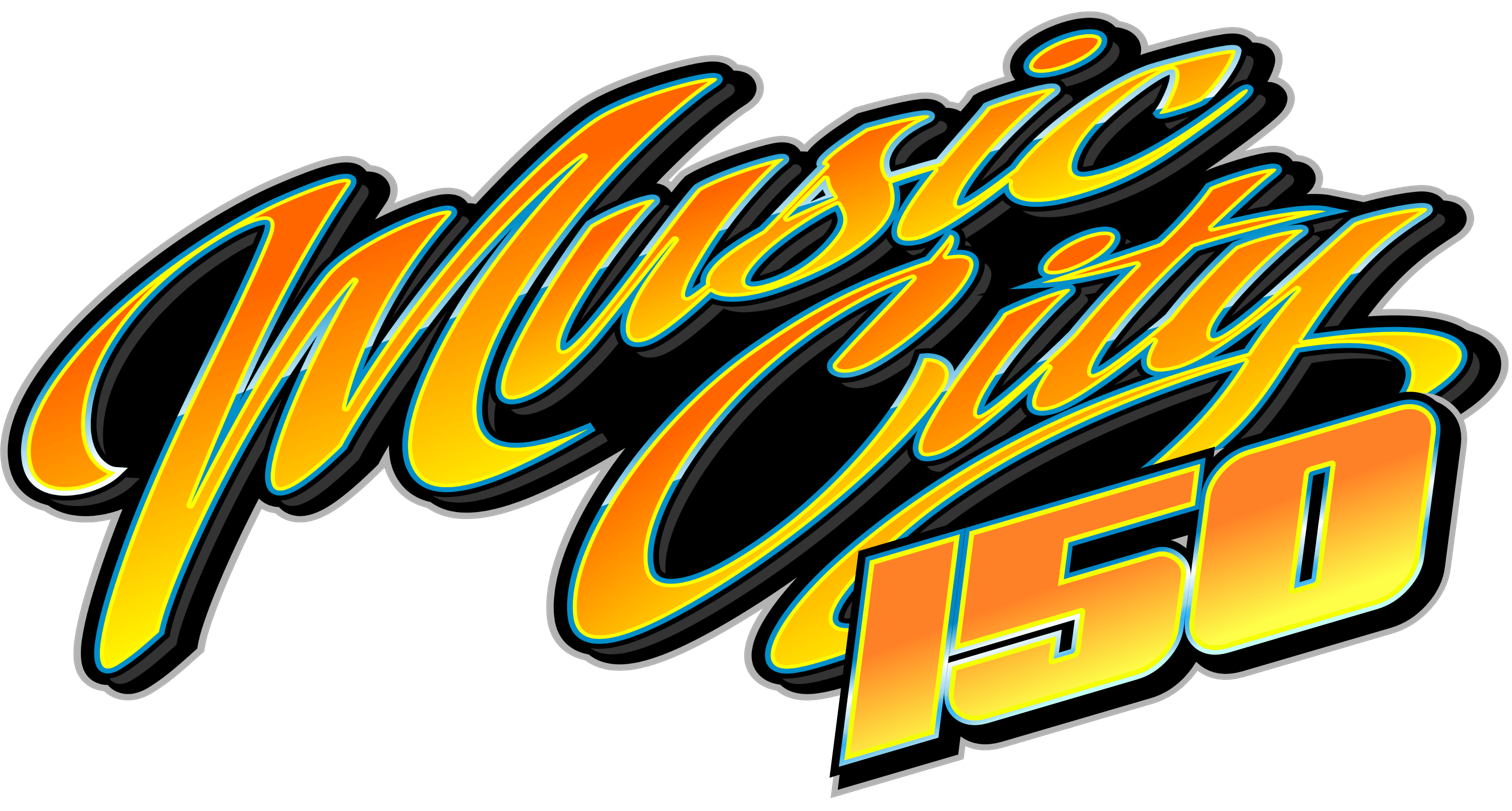
In years when the race was 150 laps in length and did not have a title sponsor, it was known as the Music City 150.

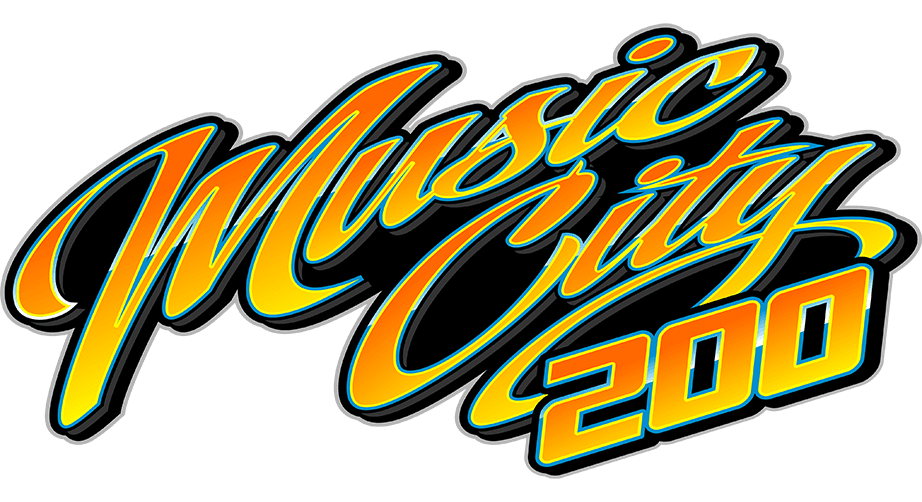
In years when the race was 200 laps in length and did not have a title sponsor, it was known as the Music City 200.

ARCA first raced at the Nashville Fairgrounds Speedway in 1992 and that year the race was won by David Green. The race did not return to the schedule in 1993 and would not return again until 2015.

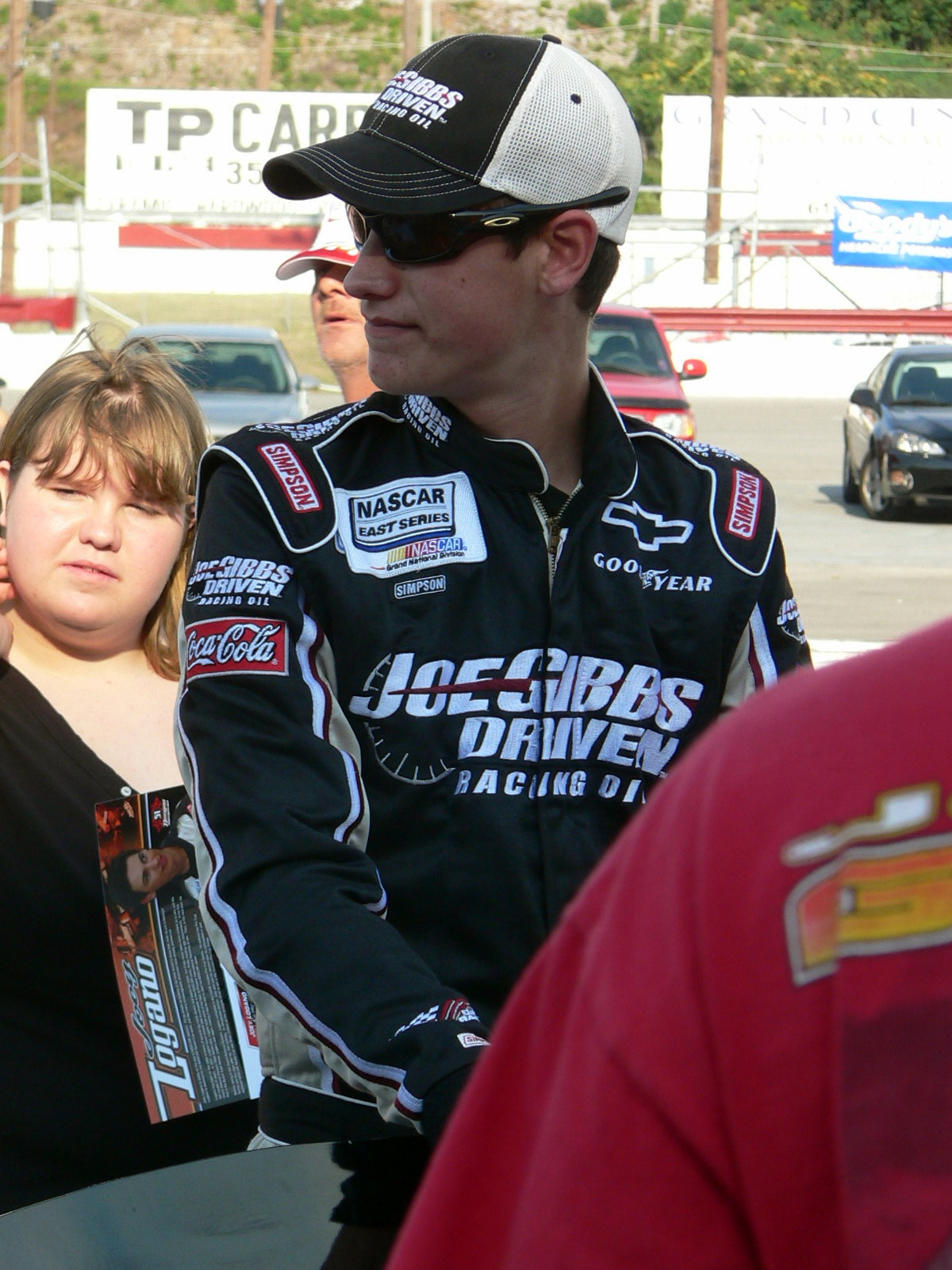
Future NASCAR Cup Series champion Joey Logano interacting with fans before competing in this race in 2007, which he finished second in, behind Rogelio López. He was 17 years old at the time.

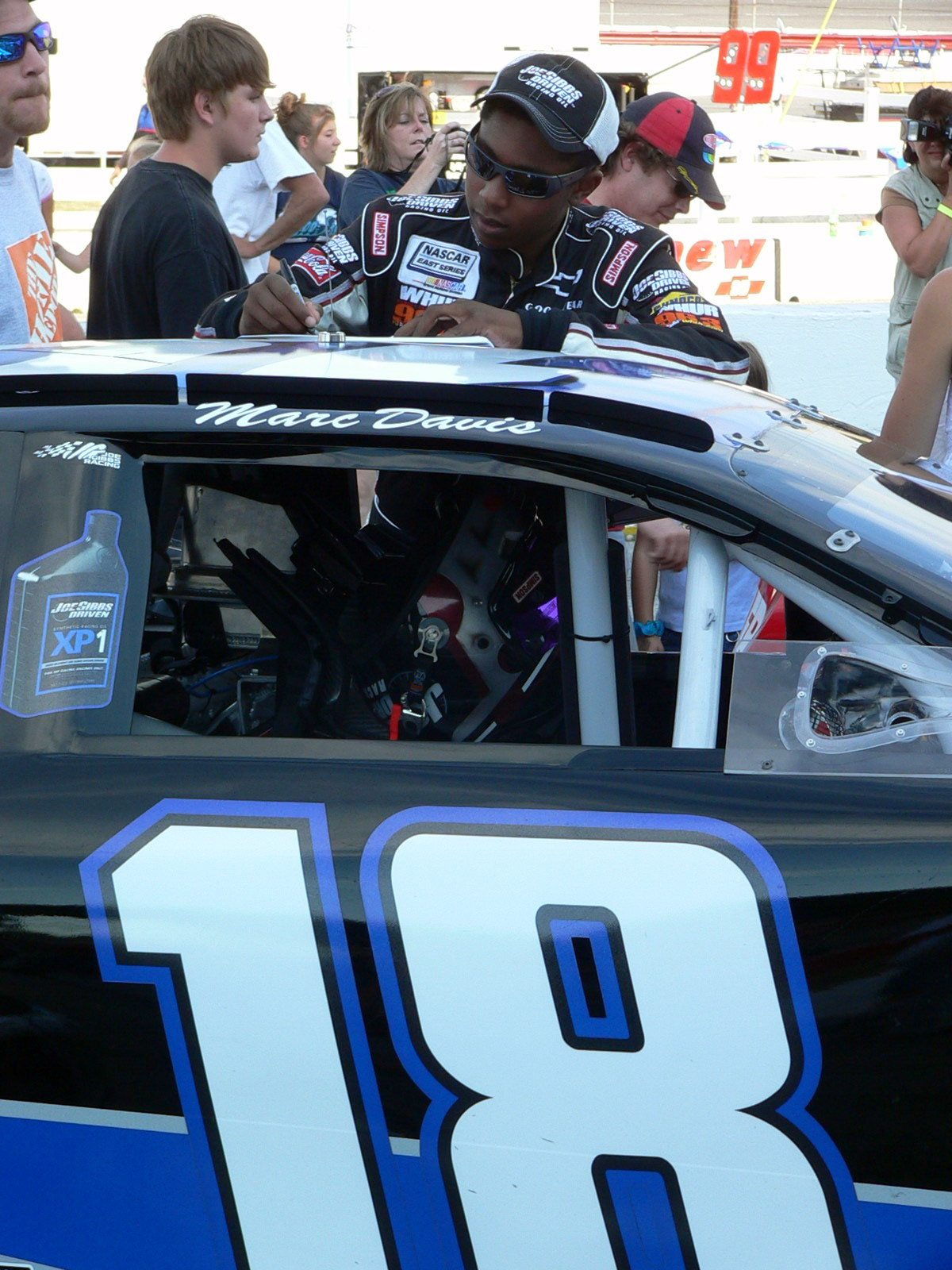
Marc Davis, Logano's teammate at Joe Gibbs Racing, signing autographs before the 2007 race, which he finished third in, behind López and Logano.

During its first stint on the East Series schedule in 2007 and 2008, the race was 150 laps instead of the 200 laps that it has had in all the other years it has been run. Rogelio López and Matt Kobyluck won the two East Series races held at the track in 2007 and 2008, respectively.

The race was a late addition to the 2020 ARCA Menards Series East schedule. The rest of the races on the schedule had been announced a month earlier. However, due to the COVID-19 pandemic, the 2020 race ended up being cancelled. It was not rescheduled for another date later in the season. Unlike some of the other cancelled races on the East Series schedule, it was not replaced by another race at a different track.

Crosley Brands became the title sponsor of the race in 2021. They did not return in 2022 and another title sponsor was not found, and as a result, the race went back to the name it has had in the years it has not had a title sponsor, the Music City 200.

In the 2024 race, the race returned to being 150 laps in length.

For the 2026 race, the race continued to be 150 laps in length.

== Past winners ==
=== ARCA Menards Series ===
Year	Date	No.	Driver	Team	Manufacturer	Race Distance		Race Time	Average speed (mph)	Report	Ref
Year	Date	No.	Driver	Team	Manufacturer	Laps	Miles	Race Time	Average speed (mph)	Report	Ref
1992	July 4	39	David Green	Roulo Brothers Racing	Chevrolet	200	119.200 (191.834)	N/A	88.043	Report	
1993 – 2014	Not held										
2015	April 11	23	Grant Enfinger	GMS Racing	Chevrolet (2)	200	119.200 (191.834)	1:27:43	81.529	Report	
2016	April 9	6	Josh Williams	Josh Williams Motorsports	Chevrolet (3)	200	119.200 (191.834)	1:29:41	79.745	Report	
2017	April 8	51	Chad Finley	Chad Finley Racing	Chevrolet (4)	200	119.200 (191.834)	2:06:11	59.549	Report	
2018	April 7	41	Zane Smith	MDM Motorsports	Toyota	200	119.200 (191.834)	1:30:21	79.2	Report	
2019	May 5	15	Christian Eckes	Venturini Motorsports	Toyota (2)	200	119.200 (191.834)	1:14:34	95.893	Report	

=== ARCA Menards Series East ===
Year	Date	No.	Driver	Team	Manufacturer	Race Distance		Race Time	Average speed (mph)	Report	Ref
Year	Date	No.	Driver	Team	Manufacturer	Laps	Miles	Race Time	Average speed (mph)	Report	Ref
2007	July 22	03	Rogelio López	Dave Davis Motorsports	Chevrolet	150	89.400 (143.875)	1:22:39	64.9	Report	
2008	July 19	40	Matt Kobyluck	Mohegan Sun Racing	Chevrolet (2)	150	89.400 (143.875)	1:12:52	73.614	Report	
2009 – 2019	Not held										
2020	May 2	Cancelled due to the COVID-19 pandemic									
2021	May 8	18	Sammy Smith	Joe Gibbs Racing	Toyota	200	119.200 (191.834)	1:18:13	91.438	Report	
2022	May 7	18	Sammy Smith	Kyle Busch Motorsports	Toyota (2)	200	119.200 (191.834)	1:31:12	78.421	Report	
2023	May 13	28	Luke Fenhaus	Pinnacle Racing Group	Chevrolet (3)	205*	122.180 (196.624)	1:24:52	86.380	Report	
2024	May 11	18	William Sawalich	Joe Gibbs Racing	Toyota (3)	150	89.400 (143.875)	1:17:20	69.362	Report	
2025	May 4	18	Max Reaves	Joe Gibbs Racing	Toyota (4)	150	89.400 (143.875)	1:06:37	80.52	Report	
2026	May 2	18	Max Reaves (2)	Joe Gibbs Racing	Toyota (5)	150	89.400 (143.875)			Report	

- Note: 2023 race extended due to green–white–checker finish.

Previous race: Rockingham ARCA Menards Series East 125	ARCA Menards Series East; Music City 150	Next race: Owens Cornings 200
