= John Trumbull Robinson =

American attorney

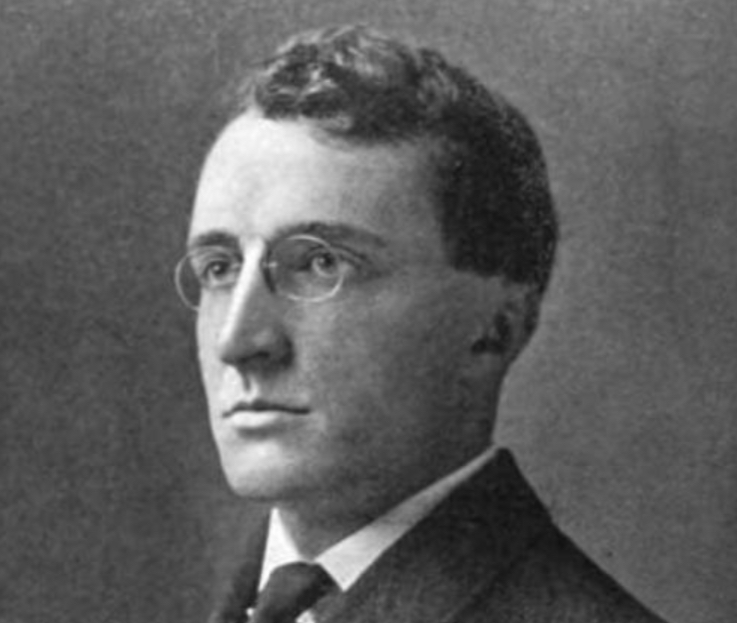

United States Attorney for the District of Connecticut
- In office 1908–1912
- President: Theodore Roosevelt; William Howard Taft
- Preceded by: Francis Hubert Parker
- Succeeded by: Frederick A. Scott

Personal details
- Born: April 25, 1871 Hartford, Connecticut, US
- Died: November 27, 1937 (aged 66)
- Party: Republican
- Spouse: Gertrude Doolittle Coxe
- Children: 2
- Education: Yale

John Trumbull Robinson (April 25, 1871 – November 27, 1937) was an American attorney who served as the United States Attorney for the District of Connecticut under two presidents.

== Early life ==
John Trumbull Robinson, was born to Henry C. and Eliza Trumbull Robinson, on April 25, 1871, in Hartford, Connecticut. His father traced his ancestry from his father’, David Franklin Robinson, to Thomas Robinson who came to Guilford from England in 1667, and from his mother, Anne Seymour Robinson, to William Brewster (one of the Pilgrims who landed at Plymouth in 1620), Richard Treat (a patentee of the Connecticut charter), and to Governor John Webster. His mother descended from William Bradford. His father served as the mayor of Hartford Connecticut.

He graduated from Hartford Public High School in 1889, from Yale University in 1893, and received his legal education by studying law in his father's office.

== Career ==
He was admitted to the Connecticut bar in 1896. His whole life was spent in Hartford with work, civic activities, and a variety of social interests, all of which by nature he entered into with zest and enjoyment. He was chairman of the Republican town committee from 1903 to 1906 and served as the executive secretary to Governor George P. McLean between 1901 and 1903. He was a delegate to the Republican national convention in 1904 and from 1908 to 1912 he was United States attorney for the District of Connecticut. Later in his life he was president of the Hartford County Bar Association.

== Personal life ==
On April 25, 1905, he married Gertrude Doolittle Coxe of Utica, New York, a daughter of Judge Alfred Conkling Coxe Sr.

He died November 27, 1937.
