= Matt Kobyluck =

Native American racing driver and developer (born 1970)

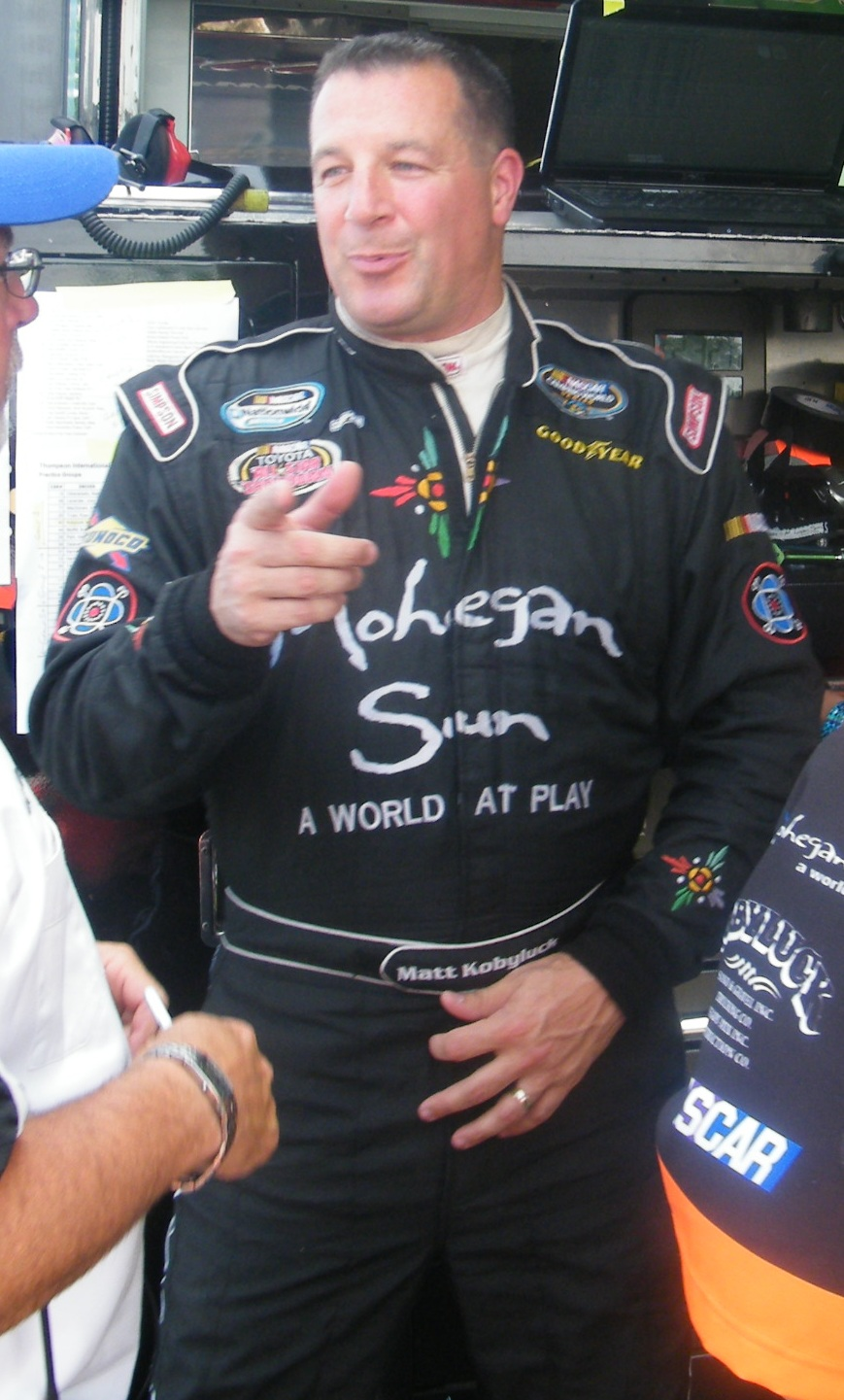
- Kobyluck in 2009
- Born: February 19, 1970 (age 56) Oakdale, Connecticut, U.S.

NASCAR K&N Pro Series East
- Years active: 1998–2010
- Starts: 178
- Wins: 16
- Poles: 7
- Best finish: 1st in 2008

Championship titles
- 2008: NASCAR Camping World East Series

Awards
- 2006, 2008: Toyota All-Star Showdown winner

NASCAR O'Reilly Auto Parts Series career
- 4 races run over 3 years
- Best finish: 119th (2006)
- First race: 2004 Siemens 200 (Loudon)
- Last race: 2006 Zippo 200 (Watkins Glen)
Wins	Top tens	Poles
0	0	0
- Statistics up to date as of March 11, 2014.

Matt Kobyluck (born February 19, 1970) is an American former stock car racing driver who competed in the NASCAR K&N Pro Series East, a regional stepping-stone series to NASCAR's national divisions. Kobyluck, who celebrated his tenth season in the NCWS East in 2008, was one of the few drivers left that competed under the old Busch North Series banner, and was the only driver of Native American descent competing in the series. He was the 2008 season champion.

== Career ==
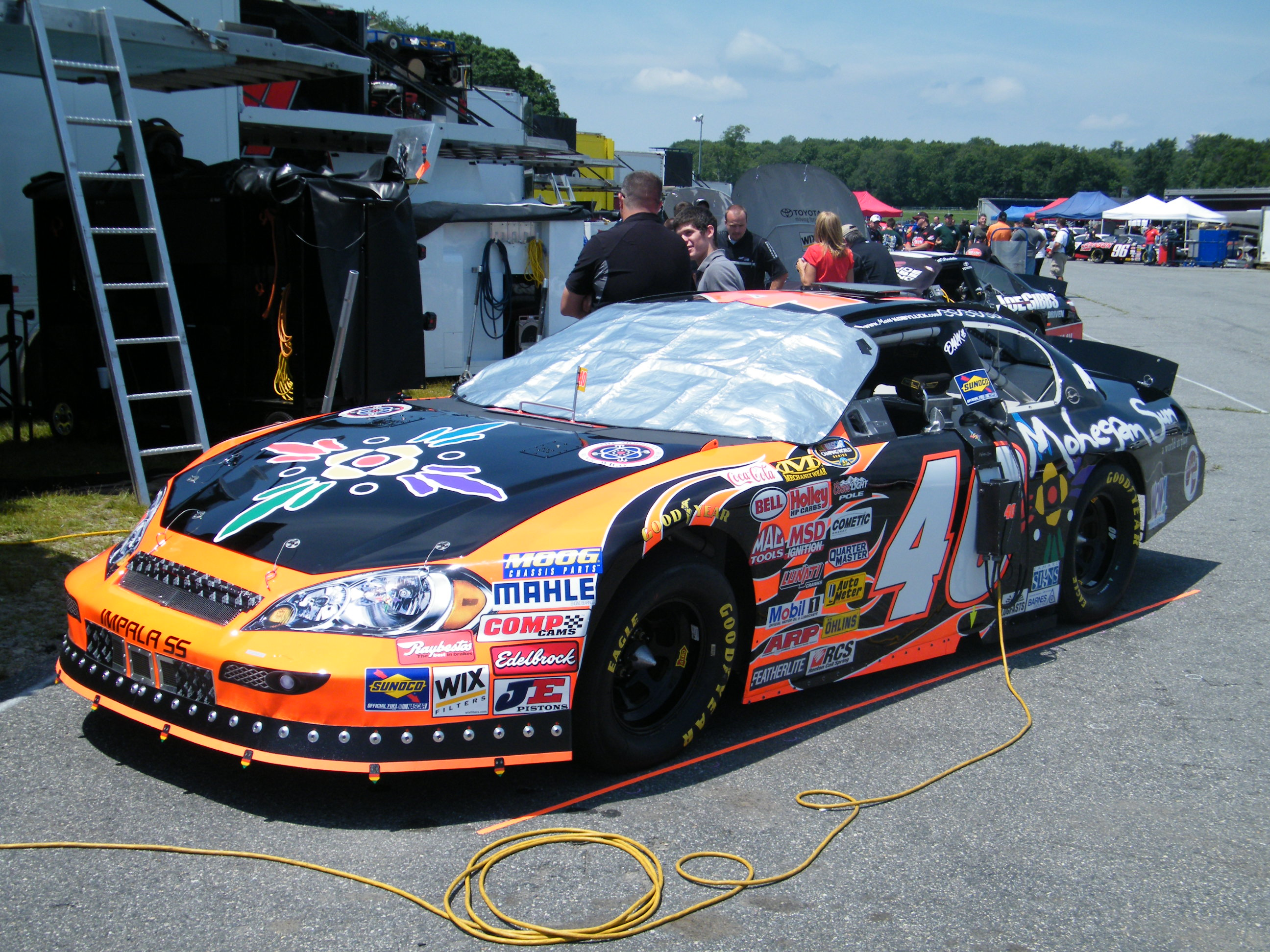
Kobyluck's 2009 car

Kobyluck began his career in 1993 driving in the popular Late Model division at Waterford Speedbowl in his home state of Connecticut. There, he posted numerous wins, top-five, and top-ten finishes – proving his ability to maneuver around the tight confines of a 3/8 mile bullring. His ease behind the wheel caught the attention of fellow competitors, and before long, he was asked to add to his already demanding schedule by piloting a car in the Modified division. His continued success left Kobyluck looking for new challenges.

In 1997, the Uncasville native moved on to Stafford Motor Speedway’s Pro Stock division. The demanding ½-mile track proved to be the challenge Kobyluck needed as he looked forward to NASCAR’s premier regional series – the NASCAR Camping World East Series (then called the Busch North Series). An accident that occurred during one of his races at Stafford in 1998 put those plans on hold temporarily as Kobyluck recovered from extensive injuries he sustained in the crash. By August of that year, ahead of the doctor’s recovery schedule, Kobyluck’s determination and strength enabled him to get back behind the wheel and pursue his dream. That fall, with Mohegan Sun Casino on board, Matt made his NASCAR Camping World Series debut at New Hampshire Motor Speedway.

Kobyluck took on a full NASCAR Camping World Series East schedule in 1999 and has since started more than 150 races with 14 wins, over 50 top-fives, and 80 top-ten finishes. He also won the prestigious NASCAR Toyota All-Star Showdown in 2006.

Kobyluck came close to winning the East Series championship in 2002 when the series title came down to the last race at Lime Rock Park when Andy Santerre beat him out by a mere nine points. He has finished in the top-five in season ending points for the last three years, and in the top-ten for last six years.

In September 2008, Kobyluck clinched the 2008 NASCAR Camping World Series Championship with a third-place finish at Dover International Speedway. Kobyluck became the first Native American to win a championship in the series. Kobyluck then finished off his 2008 season in January 2009 by winning a second Toyota All-Star Showdown.

Kobyluck is also the president of a large construction, site development, and trucking company based in Connecticut.

== Motorsports career results ==
=== NASCAR ===
(key) (Bold – Pole position awarded by qualifying time. Italics – Pole position earned by points standings or practice time. * – Most laps led.)

==== Busch Series ====
NASCAR Busch Series results
Year	Team	No.	Make	1	2	3	4	5	6	7	8	9	10	11	12	13	14	15	16	17	18	19	20	21	22	23	24	25	26	27	28	29	30	31	32	33	34	35	NBSC	Pts	Ref
2004	Kobyluck Enterprises	40	Chevy	DAY	CAR	LVS	DAR	BRI	TEX	NSH	TAL	CAL	GTY	RCH	NZH	CLT	DOV	NSH	KEN	MLW	DAY	CHI	NHA; 34	PPR	IRP	MCH	BRI	CAL	RCH	DOV; DNQ	KAN	CLT	MEM	ATL	PHO	DAR	HOM		132nd	61	
2005	Kobyluck Enterprises	50	Chevy	DAY	CAL	MXC	LVS	ATL	NSH	BRI	TEX	PHO	TAL	DAR	RCH	CLT	DOV	NSH	KEN	MLW	DAY	CHI	NHA	PPR	GTY	IRP	GLN; 35	MCH	BRI	CAL	RCH	DOV	KAN	CLT	MEM	TEX	PHO	HOM	132nd	58	
2006	Kobyluck Enterprises	04	Chevy	DAY	CAL	MXC	LVS	ATL	BRI	TEX	NSH	PHO	TAL	RCH	DAR	CLT	DOV	NSH	KEN	MLW	DAY	CHI	NHA; 39	MAR	GTY	IRP	GLN; 42	MCH	BRI	CAL	RCH	DOV	KAN	CLT	MEM	TEX	PHO	HOM	119th	83	

==== K&N Pro Series East ====
NASCAR K&N Pro Series East results
Year	Team	No.	Make	1	2	3	4	5	6	7	8	9	10	11	12	13	14	15	16	17	18	19	20	NKNPSEC	Pts	Ref
1998	Kobyluck Enterprises	40	Chevy	LEE	RPS	NHA	NZH	HOL	GLN	STA	NHA	DOV	STA; DNQ	NHA; 33	GLN	EPP	JEN	NHA; 30	THU	TMP; 32	BEE	LRP		51st	274	
1999	Kobyluck Enterprises	40	Chevy	LEE; 20	RPS; 22	NHA; 20	TMP; 35	NZH	HOL; 23	BEE; 14	JEN; 21	GLN	STA; 19	NHA; 31	NZH; 14	STA; 24	NHA; 36	GLN; 35	EPP; 26	THU; 16	BEE; 25	NHA; 17	LRP; 15	21st	1695	
2000	Kobyluck Enterprises	40	Chevy	LEE; 14	NHA; 19	SEE; 9	HOL; 9	BEE; 27	JEN; 19	GLN	STA; 14	NHA; 10	NZH	STA; 10	WFD; 16	GLN; 30	EPP; 22	TMP; 14	THU; 10	BEE; 29	NHA; 40	LRP; 32		15th	1806	
2001	Kobyluck Enterprises	40	Chevy	LEE; 23	NHA; 19	SEE; 11	HOL; 15	BEE; 12	EPP; 20	STA; 21	WFD; 19	BEE; 12	TMP; 35	NHA; 4	STA; 12	**SEE**; 9	GLN; 4	NZH; 1*	THU; 24	BEE; 10	DOV; 7	STA; 9	LRP; 8	11th	2485	
2002	Kobyluck Enterprises	40	Chevy	LEE; 5	NHA; 5	NZH; 2	SEE; 1	BEE; 2	STA; 23	HOL; 4	WFD; 23	TMP; 14	NHA; 3	STA; 2	GLN; 6	**ADI**; 2	THU; 17	BEE; 7	NHA; 9	DOV; 1	STA; 5	LRP; 6		2nd	2835	
2003	Kobyluck Enterprises	40	Chevy	LEE; 15	STA; 4	ERI; 4	BEE; 7	STA; 13	HOL; 3	TMP; 4	NHA; 38	**WFD**; 24	SEE; 14	GLN; 22	ADI; 5	BEE; 7	THU; 4	NHA; 28	STA; 4	LRP; 12*				10th	2233	
2004	Kobyluck Enterprises	40	Chevy	LEE; 7	TMP; 10	LRP; 28	SEE; 3	STA; 3	HOL; 6	ERI; 9	WFD; 3	NHA; 28	ADI; 1	GLN; 4	NHA; 26	DOV; 11								7th	1781	
2005	Kobyluck Enterprises	40	Chevy	**STA**; 1*	HOL; 3	ERI; 3	**NHA**; 19	**WFD**; 1*	ADI; 1*	STA; 20	DUB; 2	OXF; 3	NHA; 33	DOV; 8	**LRP**; 1	TMP; 5								3rd	1980	
2006	Kobyluck Enterprises	40	Chevy	GRE; 4	STA; 2*	HOL; 10	TMP; 1*	ERI; 6	NHA; 35	**ADI**; 24*	WFD; 1*	NHA; 40	DOV; 4	**LRP**; 2*										5th	1551	
2007	Kobyluck Enterprises	40	Chevy	GRE; 21	ELK; 9	IOW; 17	SBO; 1	STA; 3	NHA; 6	TMP; 2	NSH; 12	ADI; 10*	**LRP**; 1*	MFD; 2	NHA; 33	DOV; 21								4th	1840	
2008	Kobyluck Enterprises	40	Chevy	GRE; 22	IOW; 8	SBO; 5	GLN; 1	NHA; 3*	TMP; 7	NSH; 1	ADI; 1	**LRP**; 1*	MFD; 2	NHA; 3	DOV; 3	STA; 7								1st	2126	
2009	Kobyluck Enterprises	40	Chevy	GRE; 8	TRI; 10	IOW; 7	SBO; 11	GLN; 2	NHA; 11	TMP; 6	ADI; 5	LRP; 17	NHA; 4*	DOV; 15										6th	1567	
2010	Kobyluck Enterprises	40	Chevy	GRE; 15	SBO; 5	IOW; 12	MAR; 4	NHA; 12	LRP; 18	LEE; 7	GRE; 5	NHA; 23	DOV; 23											10th	1290	

==== Camping World West Series ====
NASCAR Camping World West Series results
Year	Team	No.	Make	1	2	3	4	5	6	7	8	9	10	11	12	13	NCWWSC	Pts	Ref
2003	Kobyluck Enterprises	40	Chevy	PHO; 23	LVS; 17	CAL	MAD	TCR	EVG	IRW	S99	RMR	DCS	PHO	MMR		35th	209	
2004	Kobyluck Enterprises	40	Chevy	PHO; 3	MMR	CAL	S99	EVG	IRW	S99	RMR	DCS	PHO	CNS	MMR	IRW	47th	165	
2005	Kobyluck Enterprises	40	Chevy	PHO; 7	MMR	PHO	S99	IRW	EVG	S99	PPR	CAL	DCS	CTS	MMR		41st	146	
2006	Kobyluck Enterprises	40	Chevy	PHO; 3	PHO; 30*	S99	IRW	SON	DCS	IRW	EVG	S99	CAL; 25	CTS	AMP		30th	336	
2007	Kobyluck Enterprises	40	Chevy	CTS	PHO; 36	AMP	ELK	IOW	CNS	SON	DCS	IRW	MMP	EVG	CSR	AMP	75th	55	
2008	Kobyluck Enterprises	40	Chevy	AAS	PHO; 10	CTS	IOW	CNS	SON	IRW	DCS	EVG	MMP	IRW	AMP	AAS	55th	134	

Sporting positions
Preceded by Joey Logano	NASCAR Camping World East Series champion 2008	Succeeded by Ryan Truex
