= ARCA races at Watkins Glen =

ARCA Menards Series races at Watkins Glen International

ARCA Menards Series
- Venue: Watkins Glen International
- Location: Watkins Glen, New York, United States

Circuit information
- Surface: Asphalt
- Length: 2.454 mi (3.949 km)
- Turns: 8

Stock car racing events in the ARCA Menards Series have been held at Watkins Glen International, in Watkins Glen, New York during numerous seasons and times of year since 1993.

== ARCA Menards Series ==
General Tire 100 at The Glen
ARCA Menards Series
- Venue: Watkins Glen International
- Location: Watkins Glen, New York, United States
- Corporate sponsor: General Tire
- First race: 2001
- Distance: 100.4 miles (161.578 km)
- Laps: 41
- Previous names: BetOnUSA.com 150 (2001); Clean Harbors 100 at The Glen (2021); General Tire Delivers 100 (2022)
- Most wins (manufacturer): Toyota (4)

Circuit information
- Surface: Asphalt
- Length: 2.454 mi (3.949 km)
- Turns: 8

The General Tire 100 at The Glen is an ARCA Menards Series race held annually at Watkins Glen International, on the 2.45-mile (3.94 km) road course.

=== History ===
In 2001, the ARCA Racing Series had their own race at Watkins Glen, which was won by John Finger. It was the only race they ran there before their merger with NASCAR.

In 2020, with the ARCA Menards Series East race being off the schedule, the race returned to the Main Series for their event. The event would be later canceled due to the COVID-19 pandemic. In 2021, Clean Harbors took over the naming rights and since 2022, General Tire has sponsored the race.

=== Past winners ===
Year	Date	No.	Driver	Team	Manufacturer	Race distance		Race time	Average speed (mph)
Year	Date	No.	Driver	Team	Manufacturer	Laps	Miles (km)	Race time	Average speed (mph)
2001	July 7	03	John Finger	Racer Carol Enterprises	Ford	62	151.9 (244.459)	1:42:07	89.251
2002 - 2019	Not held								
2020	August 14	Cancelled due to the COVID-19 pandemic							
2021	August 6	20	Corey Heim	Venturini Motorsports	Toyota	41	100.4 (161.578)	1:05:32	91.968
2022	August 19	81	Brandon Jones	Joe Gibbs Racing	Toyota (2)	41	100.4 (161.578)	1:17.10	78.104
2023	August 18	20	Jesse Love	Venturini Motorsports (2)	Toyota (3)	41	100.4 (161.578)	1:13.39	83.829
2024	September 13	28	Connor Zilisch	Pinnacle Racing Group	Chevrolet	41	100.4 (161.578)	0:56:30	106.673
2025	August 8	77	Tristan McKee	Spire Motorsports	Chevrolet (2)	41	100.4 (161.578)	1:06:36	90.495
2026	May 8	17	Kaden Honeycutt	Cook Racing Technologies	Toyota (4)	41	100.4 (161.578)	1:06:4	90.27

== ARCA Menards Series East ==
Great Outdoors RV Superstore 100
ARCA Menards Series East
- Venue: Watkins Glen International
- Location: Watkins Glen, New York, United States
- First race: 1993
- Last race: 2020
- Distance: 100.4 miles (161.578 km)
- Laps: 41
- Previous names: Fisher Snow Plows 125 (1993); Watkins Glen 125 (1994); Burnham Boilers 150 (1995-1997); Pepsi 150 (1998–1999); TheGlen.com sponsored by Pepsi (2000); Little Trees 150 presented by Pepsi (2001); Little Trees 150 (2002); Mohegan Sun 150 presented by Pepsi (2003–2004); East 125 at The Glen (2008); Tioga Downs Casino 125 at The Glen (2009); Bully Hill Vineyards 125 (2014–2015); Bully Hill Vineyards 100 (2016); Finger Lakes Wine Country 100 (2017); Great Outdoors RV Superstore 100 (2018–2019)
- Most wins (manufacturer): Chevrolet (10)

Circuit information
- Surface: Asphalt
- Length: 2.454 mi (3.949 km)
- Turns: 8

The Great Outdoors RV Superstore 100 was an ARCA Menards Series East race held annually at Watkins Glen International, on the 2.45-mile (3.94 km) road course. It was previously a part of the NASCAR East Series schedule until 2020 when the series was merged with ARCA and was moved to the ARCA Menards Series schedule.

=== History ===
The NASCAR Busch North Series had run at Watkins Glen from 1993 until 2004. The series, now known as the NASCAR Camping World East Series, returned to track four years later in 2008 and 2009, but the race was removed from the schedule again after that. However, after a five-year absence, the East Series returned to the Glen once again in 2014. After the unification of NASCAR's East (and West) Series and the ARCA Menards Series, the race moved to the ARCA Menards Series schedule starting in 2020. The race also became a part of the ARCA Menards Series Sioux Chief Showdown, a series of ten races within the season which features teams and drivers from the ARCA Menards Series East (the renamed NASCAR K&N Pro Series East) and ARCA Menards Series West (the renamed NASCAR K&N Pro Series West) as well competing for an additional championship.

The 2020 race ended up being cancelled and moved to the Daytona Road Course due to the COVID-19 pandemic. The race there was held on the same day (Saturday, August 14), that the Watkins Glen race would have been on. It would be removed from the East schedule and put on the Main schedule.

=== Past winners ===
Year	Date	No.	Driver	Team	Manufacturer	Race distance		Race time	Average speed (mph)
Year	Date	No.	Driver	Team	Manufacturer	Laps	Miles (km)	Race time	Average speed (mph)
1993	June 6	71	Bobby Dragon	Andover Racing	Chevrolet	51	125 (201.168)	1:21:56	91.501
1994	June 5	91	Butch Leitzinger	Butch Leitzinger Racing	Ford	51	125 (201.168)	1:23:25	89.874
1995	August 12	1	Joe Bessey	Bessey Motorsports	Pontiac	62	151.9 (244.459)	2:00:34	79.593
1996	August 10	44	Andy Santerre	Andy Santerre Racing	Chevrolet (2)	62	151.9 (244.459)	2:02:56	74.138
1997	August 9	13	Ted Christopher	Lestorti Racing	Chevrolet (3)	64*	157 (252.667)	2:22:09	66.184
1998	August 8	10	Kim Baker	Kim Baker Racing	Chevrolet (4)	62	151.9 (244.459)	2:16:01	67.006
1999	August 14	77	Bryan Wall	John Wall Racing	Ford (2)	54*	132 (212.433)	1:42:58	77.393
2000	August 12	44	Andy Santerre (2)	Andy Santerre Racing (2)	Chevrolet (5)	56*	137 (220.48)	1:48:52	75.615
2001	August 11	44	Tom Carey, Jr.	Andy Santerre Racing (3)	Chevrolet (6)	62	151.9 (244.459)	1:42:42	88.744
2002	August 10	77	Bryan Wall (2)	John Wall Racing (2)	Ford (3)	70*	172 (276.807)	2:17:12	75
2003	August 9	13	Ted Christopher (2)	Lestorti Racing (2)	Chevrolet (7)	41*	100.6 (161.900)	1:46:44	56.468
2004	August 14	35	Brad Leighton	NDS Motorsports	Ford (4)	62	151.9 (244.459)	2:04:56	72.951
2005 - 2007	Not held								
2008	June 8	40	Matt Kobyluck	Kobyluck Enterprises	Chevrolet (8)	55	134.8 (216.935)	1:55:10	70.203
2009	June 6	00	Ryan Truex	Michael Waltrip Racing	Toyota	54	132.3 (212.916)	2:07:55	62.056
2010 - 2013	Not held								
2014	August 8	34	Scott Heckert	Turner Scott Motorsports	Chevrolet (9)	53*	130 (209.215)	1:33:56	82.942
2015	August 7	34	Scott Heckert (2)	HScott Motorsports	Chevrolet (10)	51	125 (201.168)	1:48:19	69.214
2016	August 5	39	Austin Cindric	Martin-McClure Racing	Toyota (2)	41	100.4 (161.578)	1:06:32	90.586
2017	August 4	7	Will Rodgers	Jefferson Pitts Racing	Ford (5)	42*	103 (165.762)	1:14:07	83.301
2018	August 3	1	Brett Moffitt	Hattori Racing Enterprises	Toyota (3)	41	100.4 (161.578)	1:16:48	78.477
2019	August 2	1	Max McLaughlin	Hattori Racing Enterprises (2)	Toyota (4)	34*	83.436 (134.266)	1:09:56	71.468

- 1999: Race shortened due to time constraints.
- 2000, 2003 and 2019: Race shortened due to rain.
- 1997, 2002, 2014 and 2017: Race extended due to a NASCAR Overtime finish.

Previous race: Alabama Manufactured Housing 200	ARCA Menards Series; General Tire 100 at The Glen	Next race: Owens Corning 200
