= Francis Hubert Parker =

American attorney (1850–1927)

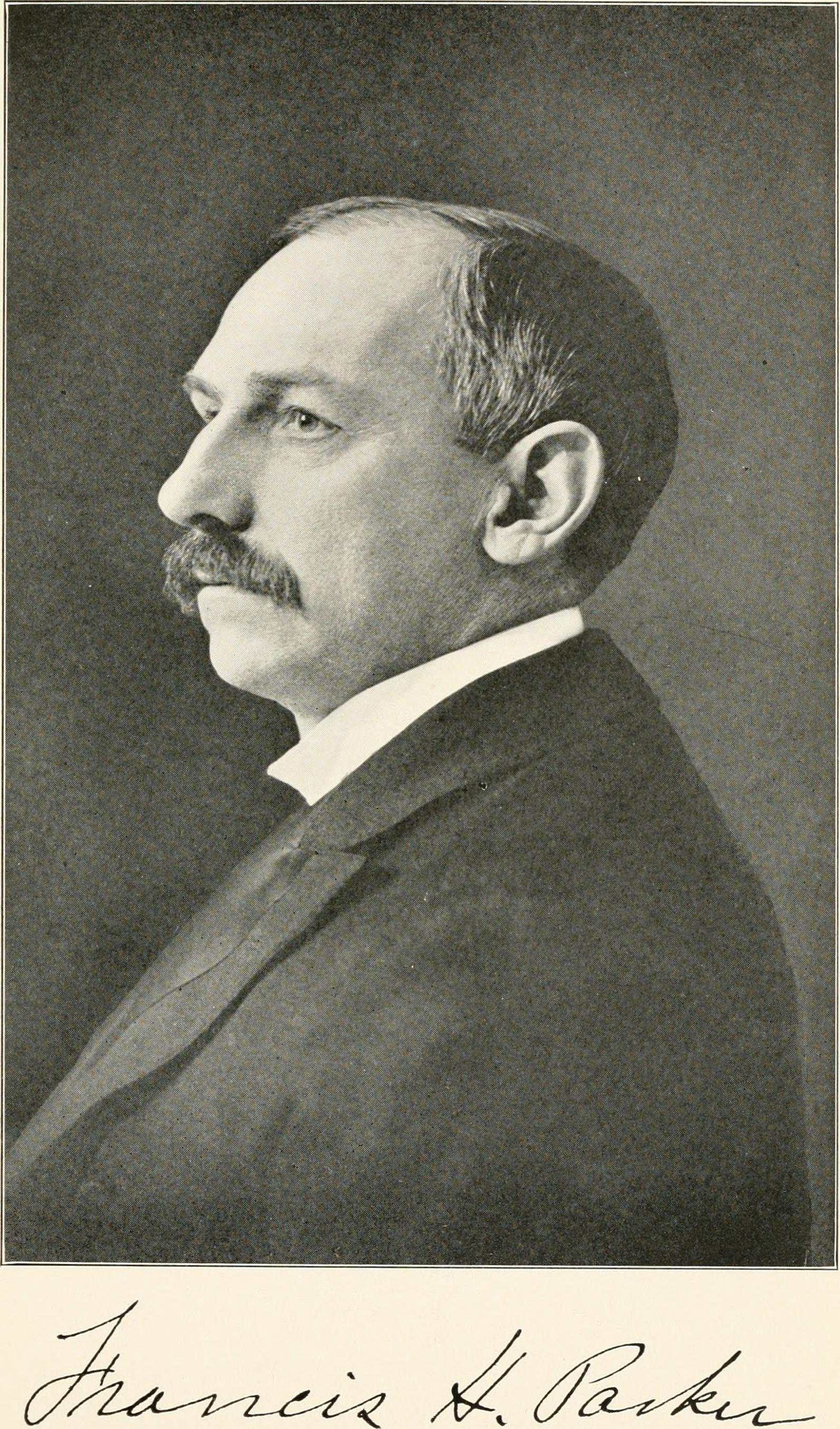

United States Attorney for the District of Connecticut
- In office 1900–1908
- President: William McKinley; Theodore Roosevelt
- Preceded by: Charles W. Comstock
- Succeeded by: John T. Robinson

Connecticut General Assembly
- In office 1878–1882
- In office 1909–1911

Personal details
- Born: September 23, 1850 East Haddam, Connecticut, U.S.
- Died: February 9, 1927 (aged 76) East Haddam, Connecticut, U.S.
- Party: Republican
- Spouse: Adelaide Leeds Parker
- Education: Wesleyan University (1874); Yale Law School (1876)

Francis Hubert Parker (September 23, 1850 – February 9, 1927) was an American attorney and judge who served as the United States Attorney for the District of Connecticut under two presidents.

== Biography ==
Francis H. Parker was born in East Haddam, Connecticut on September 23, 1850, to Oziah H. and Maria Ayers Parker. He graduated from Wesleyan University in 1874 and from Yale Law School in 1876. After graduation he began to practice law in Hartford, Connecticut. He represented East Haddam in the General Assembly in 1878 and 1880. He served as the prosecuting attorney for Hartford from 1887 to 1891. He unsuccessfully campaigned for state senate in 1894 and between 1898 and 1900, he served as a referee in bankruptcy court for the district of Hartford. He resigned to accept the appointment of United States attorney for Connecticut. He retired in 1908 and served once more in the General Assembly in 1909, this time representing Hartford. He moved back to East Haddam in 1925 where he died on February 10, 1927. Parker was a delegate to several Republican conventions, and was chairman of the Hartford Republican town Committee from 1895 to 1900, trustee of the Meriden School for Boys from 1898 to 1900, chairman of the Connecticut Historical Society for over twenty years, and president of the Hartford County Bar Association from 1921 to 1925.
