= Charles W. Comstock =

American attorney and judge (1858–1917)

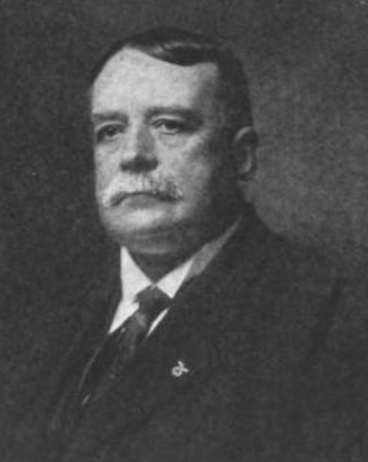

United States Attorney for the District of Connecticut
- In office 1896–1900
- President: Grover Cleveland; William McKinley
- Preceded by: George P. McLean
- Succeeded by: Francis H. Parker

Judge of Connecticut Probate Courts for Montville
- In office 1889–1896

Personal details
- Born: Charles Whipple Comstock; October 9, 1857 Montville, Connecticut, US
- Died: May 8, 1917 (aged 59) Montville, Connecticut, US
- Party: Democratic

Charles Whipple Comstock (October 9, 1858 – May 8, 1917) was an American attorney and judge who served as the United States Attorney for the District of Connecticut under two presidents.

== Early life ==
Charles Whipple Comstock was born on October 9, 1857, in Montville, Connecticut, to Nathan Strickland and Caroline Mary (Whipple) Comstock. His father's side descended from Reverend John Rogers (the martyr) and that side of the family emigrated to America in the mid 16th century from England. On his mother's side he descended from Governor William Bradford of the Mayflower. His father was a farmer and merchant, leading Charles to attend public schools and Norwich Free Academy.

== Legal career ==
Instead of College he wanted to go into law therefore he began studying under Lafayette S. Foster, and in 1881 he passed the bar and began practicing law in Norwich. He would work with Charles F. Thayer the former mayor of Norwich and George Parsons. In 1913 he had and won his first case before the United States Supreme Court in Robbins- Pattenson v Central Vermont Railroad.

=== United States Attorney ===
During President Cleveland's second term in office, he appointed Charles to be US Attorney for the district of Connecticut, a position he held for four years.

=== Judgeship ===
He had previously served as a probate judge in Montville from 1889 to 1896.

=== Politics ===
In 1914 he was in the race to be the Democratic nominee for Governor of Connecticut. He spent years working with the Democrats attending multiple Democratic National Conventions. He died on May 8, 1917.

== Masonry ==
He was a 32nd degree Freemason.
