= Frederick A. Scott =

American politician and attorney (1866–1957)

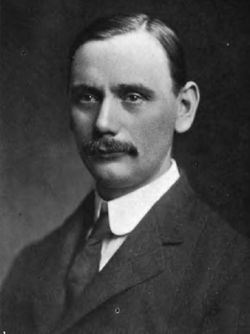

Connecticut General Assembly
- In office 1905–1912

United States Attorney for the District of Connecticut
- In office April 15, 1912 – 1915
- President: William Howard Taft; Woodrow Wilson
- Preceded by: John T. Robinson
- Succeeded by: Thomas J. Spellacy

Personal details
- Born: November 8, 1866 Plymouth, Connecticut
- Died: April 24, 1957 (aged 90) Hartford, Connecticut
- Party: Republican
- Education: Yale (1889); Yale Law School (1891)

Frederick A. Scott (November 8, 1866 – April 24, 1957) was an American attorney who served as the United States Attorney for the District of Connecticut under two presidents of the United States. He also served as the speaker of the house of the Connecticut House of Representatives.

== Early life and education ==
Frederick A. Scott was born in Plymouth on November 8, 1866 to Walter H. and Sarah (Granniss) Scott. He was educated in public schools and graduated Hartford Public High School in 1885. He then went on to Yale which he graduated in 1889 and Yale Law School which he graduated cum laude in 1891.

== Career ==
Scott was admitted to the bar in June 1891 and would be an attorney in Hartford for over 50 years. He was the director of the public library and would work as a clerk in the Connecticut Senate and the Connecticut House of Representatives. He was first elected to the State House of Representatives in 1905, served as Speaker of the House in 1911, and later Bills Clerk of the House and was appointed Statute Revision Commissioner in 1929. He also served as U.S. District Attorney for the State of Connecticut under President Taft and Wilson.
