= Toyota All-Star Showdown =

Former all-star event

The SRL All-Star Showdown is a Super Late Model championship event at Irwindale Speedway, originally held from the 2006-2010 seasons as a non-championship NASCAR event for lower-level series, and since the 2020 motorsport season, revived by the circuit was a Super Late Model event for the SRL Southwest Tour.

The original format from the 2003-2011 seasons were sanctioned by NASCAR. The revived event, which the track and the Southwest Tour still recognise continually, continues to be held at Irwindale. In 2022 and 2023, the race was held on the Saturday of NASCAR's Busch Light Clash at the Coliseum in nearby Los Angeles. The 2024 race was postponed by weather and moved to May 16–18.

== 2006 format ==
In 2006, the Showdown was a two-race card, as it had been throughout its brief history. One was for drivers in the AutoZone Elite Division, comprising the Northwest, Southeast, Southwest, and Midwest divisions. The other was for drivers in the Grand National Division, which was made up of the Busch East and AutoZone West Divisions.

The top 15 drivers in points in each of the two Grand National series comprised the field for that division's race for a total of 30, while the top 10 drivers in points in each of the four Elite series set the field for that division's race, or 40 in total.

On Friday night, the fields were split in half and the drivers competed in qualifying races (akin to the Gatorade Duel) to determine the starting lineup for the following night's main event. The drivers with the worst position in their respective division's standings started at the front of the field, and the lineups were filled by alternating the series. (For example, a Northwest driver followed by a Southeast driver followed by a Southwest driver followed by a Midwest driver.)

Drivers in the first race took the inside lanes for the Saturday main event, while those in the second race took the outside lane. All drivers entered automatically qualified for the main race.

== 2007 format ==
The 2007 Showdown was held October 19–20, again at Irwindale Speedway, with a new two-day format.

The first race became a 150-lap Super Late Model race held on the Friday night, with any Super Late Model racer who races in a NASCAR Whelen All-American Series track eligible for the event.

The Grand National race featured major changes:

- The race is 250 laps (held in 3 segments of 100, 100, and 50 laps with 10-minute breaks in between – the only time cars are allowed to change tires except for flats or damage) and features a 40-car starting field.
- Top 15 drivers in both Grand National divisions invited and receive bonus money.
- Any driver approved by NASCAR to race in this division at tracks of one-half mile or greater may attempt this race. (Previously, only the top 15 in each division was eligible.)
- Only exempt cars automatically qualified for the race.
- Exemptions were awarded on the following (Any Grand National team may help these champions in other cars obtain a ride):
  - Any Grand National race winner in 2007.
  - All NASCAR Regional Series champions for 2007
    - Busch East Series
    - NASCAR West Series
    - Whelen Modified Tour
    - Whelen Southern Modified Tour
    - Canadian Tire Series
    - Corona Series leader as of September 2 (Due to the race being before the NCS season ends; this problem was resolved with the 2008 season by moving the race to January 2009)
    - Whelen All-American Series National Champion
- These exempt drivers (minimum seven) will be added with the top cars from Friday qualifying to form a 30-car starting field.
- A 50-lap last chance qualifier will establish the final ten cars for Saturday's 250-lap feature.

The format change was required because the Elite Division is no longer in place. NASCAR disbanded the division after the 2006 season.

== 2008 season format ==
A major criticism of the format was that because of the All-Star Showdown date, it could result in the race being held before certain major races (such as the ones at Phoenix International Raceway on Sprint Cup weekend) could be held before the Showdown. NASCAR had a problem with the Corona Series still in progress before the Showdown.

Thus, NASCAR moved the race to January 2009 for the 2008 season champions, allowing the entire NASCAR season for regional racing to finish before running the Showdown.

The 2008 season format will remain the same, with the Camping World East and West, Whelen Modified, Southern Modified, and All-American National, Canadian Tire, and Corona Series champions, and also race winners from the Camping World East and West series entered in the race.

The 150-lap late model race on Friday continues.

Rain interrupted the Showdown and forced all three races to be run on Saturday; however, only the Camping World Series race was run to its conclusion, with the race going past 10:30 pm.

Although Joey Logano crossed the finish line first, he was penalized by NASCAR for rough driving after an incident with Peyton Sellers on the last lap, and dropped to 40th place. Matt Kobyluck, who crossed the finish line in second place was awarded the victory and became the first 2-time winner of the event.

The Late Model race, a 75-lap race intended to run before the Camping World feature, was run afterwards, and hit the 40-minute time limit at 55 laps. The 150-lap Super Late Model race, intended for Friday, was run as a race that was after the Late Model race, and only ran until the 12:15 am curfew, which meant just 15 laps.

== 2009 season format ==
The 2009 season's All-Star Showdown is set for January 30, 2010, again at Irwindale.

All race winners during both Camping World Series regional tours, in addition to the Series Champions of both Camping World Series, both Whelen Modified Tours, Canadian Tire Series, and Mexico Series, and the top five in the Whelen All-American Series National Standings (all must be state champions – new for the 2009 season; in previous years, it was only the National Champion), will be awarded exemptions to advance to the feature. Qualifying, provisionals for Camping World Series regulars based on the 2009 results, and top drivers in the qualifying race will determine the starting order.

For the 2009 season version, the Super Late Model race (100 laps) will have the top five NASCAR Whelen All-American Series state champions automatically qualified. The Late Model race (75 laps) will continue.

Nick Joanides, the 2009 Late Model and Super Late Model division champion in the same season was the only driver entered in all three series, including the Camping World Series race where he won the Coca-Cola Move of the Race award.

== 2010 season format ==
The 2010 NASCAR season concludes with the All-Star Showdown for January 29, 2011, again at Irwindale.

The format again will carry the 225-lap K&N Pro Series (the new name for the Grand National Division for the 2010 season) race as the feature, with two 100-lap segments and a 25-lap final segment.

All K&N Pro Series race winners, both regional series champions, and champions of the Canadian Tire Series, Corona Mexico Series, and Whelen All-American Series are invited.

For the 2010 season version, the Super Late Model race (75 laps) will have the top five NASCAR Whelen All-American Series state champions automatically qualified. The Late Model race (50 laps) will continue. Both the Super Late Model (25 laps) and Late Models (20 laps) will have qualification determined by heat races.

== 2020 SRL Format ==
The Spears SRL Southwest Tour, a Super Late Model tour, revived the race in 2020. It features three divisions for the SRL, the Super Late Models, which run to rules of most short tracks that run the class and notable Super Late Model special races such as the Snowball Derby, Anderson 400, and All American 400 in Nashville, the Pro Late Models, which are a different configuration than the more familiar NASCAR-spec Late Models run on the East Coast, and Modifieds, which differ from their Northeastern counterparts.

The Super Late Model race is 200 laps with a controlled caution around the halfway point for tire and refueling. The Pro Late Model is 100 laps. The Modified race is 75 laps.

The race has been run in early February in 2020-2022, and is scheduled in 2023 to be run in mid-January as part of the SRL's national Super Late Model tour with races in Alabama, Missouri, Michigan, and Florida, most notably the Rattler 250 in Kinston, AL.

In 2024, the race was scheduled again for Busch Clash weekend in Los Angeles, but was postponed to May because of expected inclement weather.

== Winners ==
NOTE: From 2008 to 2011, under the NASCAR format, the race was run in January of the ensuing year of the season listed, similar to the NFL Playoffs. Entry forms for this race since the 2008 season race (held January 2009) specifically state this is a 2008 NASCAR season race. Also, the Late Model and Super Late Model races are also run under the previous season's rules and regulations and do not count towards the track's new season, as the new season for these series does not start until late March or early April. As such, the January 2011 races are 2010 season events, and NASCAR lists the January 2010 race as part of the 2009 season.

=== K&N Pro Series ===
By NASCAR season

- 2011: Jason Bowles
- 2010: Joey Logano
- 2009: Matt Kobyluck^{1}
- 2008: Matt Kobyluck
- 2007: Joey Logano
- 2006: Matt Kobyluck
- 2005: David Gilliland^{2}
- 2004: Mike Johnson
- 2003: Austin Cameron

^{1}Joey Logano was disqualified for intentionally crashing leader Peyton Sellers in the final lap to pass Sellers to win the race.

^{2}Mike Olsen was disqualified for illegal right-side wheels that were wider and lighter than what is approved by NASCAR.

=== Super Late Models ===
By NASCAR season, 2006-09

- 2023: Jacob Gomes
- 2022: Derek Thorn
- 2021: Preston Peltier (176 laps - time constraints)
- 2020: Derek Thorn (first under revival of SRL Southwest Tour)
- 2010: Ryan Partridge
- 2009: Rip Michaels – (65 laps – time constraints)
- 2008: Travis Thirkettle – 15 laps because of 12:15 am curfew
- 2007: Greg Pursley (first under new Late Model format)
- 2006: Tim Schendel (last with old NASCAR Elite Division cars)
- 2005: Auggie Vidovich
- 2004: Eric Holmes
- 2003: Ron Breese Jr.

=== Pro Late Models ===
By NASCAR season, 2008-10

- 2023: Linny White (55 laps - time constraints)
- 2022: Dylan Cappello
- 2021: Jeremy Doss
- 2010: Sean Woodside
- 2009: Tim Huddleston
- 2008: Mike Johnson (55 laps – time constraints)

=== Modifieds ===
- 2023: Travis Thirkettle
- 2022: Travis Thirkettle
- 2021: Jeremy Doss
- 2020: Travis Thirkettle
