= Montville, Connecticut =

- Town
- Town of Montville
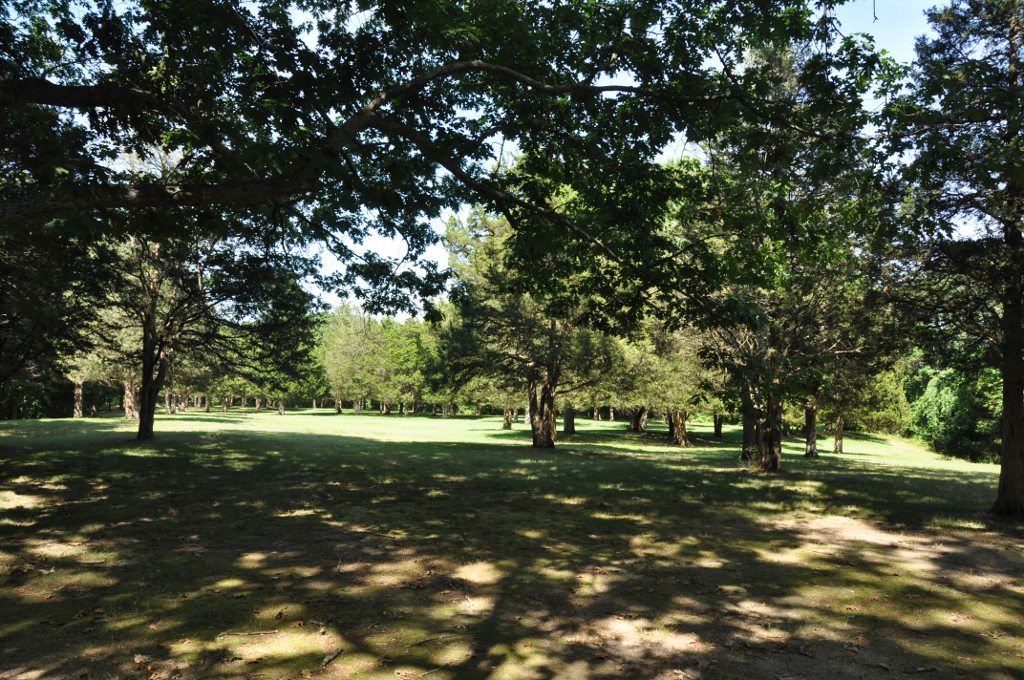
- Fort Shantok, on the Mohegan reservation

- Seal

- Coordinates: 41°27′50″N 72°09′20″W
- Country: United States
- U.S. state: Connecticut
- County: New London
- Region: Southeastern CT
- Incorporated: 1786

Government
  - Type: Mayor-council
  - Mayor: Leonard Bunnell (D)

Area
  - Total: 44.2 sq mi (114.4 km^{2})
  - Land: 42.0 sq mi (108.7 km^{2})
  - Water: 2.2 sq mi (5.8 km^{2})
- Elevation: 1,099 ft (335 m)

Population (2020)
  - Total: 18,387
  - Density: 438.1/sq mi (169.2/km^{2})
- Time zone: UTC−5 (EST)
  - Summer (DST): UTC−4 (EDT)
- ZIP Codes: 06353, 06370, 06382
- Area codes: 860/959
- FIPS code: 09-48900
- GNIS feature ID: 0213464
- Website: www.montville-ct.org

Montville is a town in New London County, Connecticut, United States. The town is part of the Southeastern Connecticut Planning Region. The population was 18,387 at the 2020 census.

The villages of Chesterfield, Mohegan, Oakdale, and Uncasville are located within the town; the latter two have their own ZIP Codes. Town residents often identify with these villages more than the Town of Montville as a whole. The Mohegan Sun casino resort is located in the village of Uncasville.

== History ==
In the 17th century, when English settlers arrived, southeastern Connecticut was the scene of rivalry between the Pequot people, the dominant Native American group in the New London area, and the newly independent Mohegan. The latter became friendly to the English. For defense against the Pequot, the Mohegan sachem Uncas had established a fortified village on a promontory above the Thames River within what is now the town of Montville. The Mohegan village, now known as Fort Shantok, was protected on the inland side by palisades first built in about 1636 at the time of the Pequot War, rebuilt during wars with the Narragansett people c. 1653–1657, and rebuilt again at the time of King Philip's War (1675–1676).

When the boundaries of New London (then called "Pequot") were first defined in 1646, the Oxoboxo River formed the northern boundary. Parts of the modern town of Montville lying south of the river were included in New London, while the area north of the river was treated as Mohegan land. Over time the settlers assumed control of the Mohegan lands. The first grants were made by Uncas in 1658 to Richard Houghton and James Rogers, consisting of valuable farms along the river. Some Mohegan grants were gifts of friendship or by fair trade, while others were openly fraudulent. By 1703 the area between the Oxoboxo River and Norwich (now part of the town of Montville) was annexed by New London.

In 1786 Montville was separated from New London and incorporated as a separate Town. Before incorporation, it was known as the North Parish of New London. In 1819 the adjacent Town of Salem was formed from parts of the towns of Montville, Lyme, and Colchester. The name "Montville" signifies "mountain village".

=== National Register of Historic Places ===
Four properties in town are listed on the National Register of Historic Places:

- Bridge No. 1860 on Massapeag Side Road (Route 433) over Shantok Brook, Fort Shantok SP (added August 29, 1993)
- Fort Shantok Archeological District (added April 20, 1986)
- Raymond-Bradford Homestead on Raymond Hill Road (added May 16, 1982)
- Uncasville School, which now serves as the Montville Town Hall, at 310 Norwich-New London Turnpike (added March 23, 2001)

== Geography ==
According to the United States Census Bureau, the town has a total area of 44.2 square miles (114.4 km^{2}), of which 42.0 square miles (108.7 km^{2}) is land and 2.2 square miles (5.8 km^{2}), or 5.06%, is water.

=== Principal communities ===
- Chesterfield
- Kitemaug
- Massapeag
- Mohegan
- Oakdale
- Oxoboxo River
- Palmertown
- Uncasville

Town residents often identify with these villages more than the Town of Montville as a whole. The center of Oakdale is small, consisting of only a few private residences and the post office. The Mohegan Sun casino resort is often referred to as being in Uncasville, although the village is three miles to the south. The Mohegan refer to Uncasville as it is named for a prominent sachem of theirs from the 17th century.

== Demographics ==
Historical population
Census	Pop.	Note	%±
1820	1,951		—
1850	1,848		—
1860	2,141		15.9%
1870	2,495		16.5%
1880	2,664		6.8%
1890	2,344		−12.0%
1900	2,395		2.2%
1910	2,894		20.8%
1920	3,411		17.9%
1930	3,970		16.4%
1940	4,135		4.2%
1950	4,766		15.3%
1960	7,759		62.8%
1970	15,662		101.9%
1980	16,455		5.1%
1990	16,673		1.3%
2000	18,546		11.2%
2010	19,571		5.5%
2020	18,387		−6.0%
U.S. Decennial Census

As of the census of 2000, there were 18,546 people, 6,426 households, and 4,678 families residing in the town. The population density was 441.4 inhabitants per square mile (170.4/km^{2}). There were 6,805 housing units at an average density of 162.0 per square mile (62.5/km^{2}). The racial makeup of the town was 86.03% White, 5.49% African American, 1.46% Native American, 1.89% Asian, 0.04% Pacific Islander, 2.23% from other races, and 2.86% from two or more races. Hispanic or Latino of any race were 5.45% of the population.

There were 6,426 households, out of which 34.7% had children under the age of 18 living with them, 58.6% were married couples living together, 9.9% had a female householder with no husband present, and 27.2% were non-families. 21.3% of all households were made up of individuals, and 7.4% had someone living alone who was 65 years of age or older. The average household size was 2.63 and the average family size was 3.05.

In the town, the population was spread out, with 23.6% under the age of 18, 8.5% from 18 to 24, 34.2% from 25 to 44, 22.8% from 45 to 64, and 10.8% who were 65 years of age or older. The median age was 36 years. For every 100 females, there were 117.2 males. For every 100 females age 18 and over, there were 119.7 males.

The median income for a household in the town was $55,086, and the median income for a family was $61,643. Males had a median income of $40,922 versus $30,206 for females. The per capita income for the town was $22,357. About 3.1% of families and 4.1% of the population were below the poverty line, including 4.3% of those under age 18 and 4.5% of those age 65 or over.

Part of Montville is also treated by the U.S. Census Bureau as a census-designated place called Oxoboxo River.

== American Indians ==
The Mohegan Native American Tribal Nation has been a presence in this area of Connecticut since the 16th century, and descended from indigenous cultures in the area for thousands of years. In the seventeenth century, the colony of Connecticut granted them a 700-acre (2.8 km^{2}) reservation, located north of the present-day village of Uncasville. Although the reservation is within the borders of the town of Montville, the tribe is federally recognized as a sovereign nation not subject to local or state laws. In addition to operating the Mohegan Sun, a casino resort that opened in 1996, the tribal nation also provides educational programs about their nation's heritage and history.

== Residents of Chinese descent ==
Since at least the 1990s, people of Chinese descent have moved into the area drawn either by the work available at Mohegan Sun and the rising prices in the Northeast's Chinatowns. Their presence, the subject of an exhibition that travelled from the Lyman Allyn Museum in New London to New York City's Museum of Chinese in America, has sparked at least one allegedly racist incident.

== Education ==
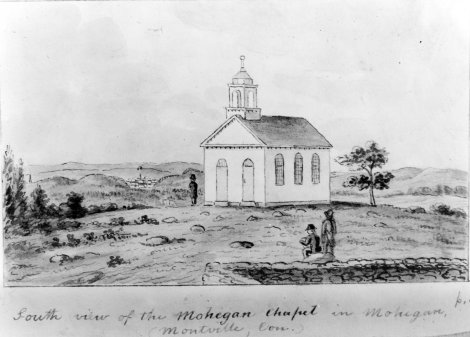
South View of Mohegan Chapel, Monhegan in Montville, a sketch by John Warner Barber for his Historical Collections of Connecticut (1836). According to the Connecticut Historical Society, the chapel was constructed in 1831 with funds from "benevolent ladies in Norwich, Hartford and New London" as a church for Mohegan and white residents of the reservation in Montville.

Public schools in Montville are overseen by Montville Public Schools, the town's public school system, operated by a board that includes nine elected members and two high school student representatives. The school system operates a regular high school, an alternative high school, a middle school, and three elementary schools.

Montville High School serves grades 9 through 12. Enrollment is approximately 800 students.

The town is also home to private boarding school St. Thomas More School, known for its basketball program.

== Economy ==
=== Power plant ===
NRG Energy Inc., based in La Jolla, California, operates an oil and natural gas-powered electricity generating plant in Montville, labeled by environmentalists as one of the "Sooty Six", the dirtiest power plants in the state. The plant was required to install pollution controls to comply with the state's 2002 power plant pollution law. In June 2006 the company proposed building a new type of coal-powered plant on the site for $1.6 billion.

In return for building the plant, the company demanded that the state guarantee NRG long-term contracts for buying the electricity it generates and pick NRG's proposal over other plans for building new power plants in the state. At the time of NRG's proposal, only 18 plants in the world and two in North America used the Integrated Gasification Combined-Cycle technology which the company suggested. Contracts were to be awarded by the DPUC in early 2007. The company said the new plant could open in 2012. NRG Energy announced plans on August 5, 2013, to add fuel cells, solar and biomass conversion to the plant

== Notable people ==
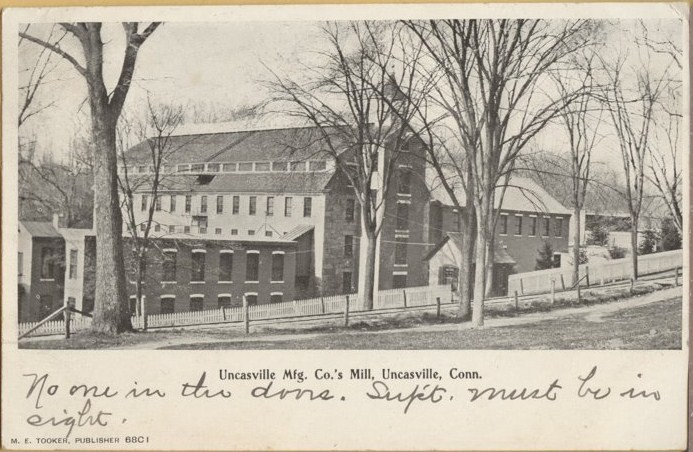
Uncasville Mfg. Co. mill, c. 1906

- George Miller Beard (1839–1883), neurologist who coined the term "neurasthenia" in 1869
- Charles W. Comstock (1857–1917), United States Attorney for the District of Connecticut and former Connecticut Judge
- Sidney E. Frank (1919–2006), billionaire businessman who promoted Grey Goose vodka and Jägermeister
- Ned Hanlon (1857–1937), member of the Baseball Hall of Fame
- James Hillhouse (1754–1832), real estate developer who constructed significant areas of New Haven. He was a congressman, U.S. senator and, for many years, treasurer of Yale University
- David Jewett (1772–1842), 19th Century naval commander
- Samson Occom (1723–1792), Mohegan minister and preacher
- Oliver Hillhouse Prince (1787–1837), represented Georgia in the U.S. Senate for less than a year

== Politics ==
Voter Registration and Party Enrollment as of October 25, 2005
Party	Active Voters	Inactive Voters	Total Voters	Percentage
Democratic	2,613	80	2,693	27.69%
Republican	1,517	70	1,587	16.32%
Unaffiliated	5,142	286	5,428	55.81%
Minor parties	16	1	17	0.17%
Total	9,288	437	9,725	100%
