= Oxoboxo River =

River in the United States of America

Oxoboxo River Oxoboxo Brook
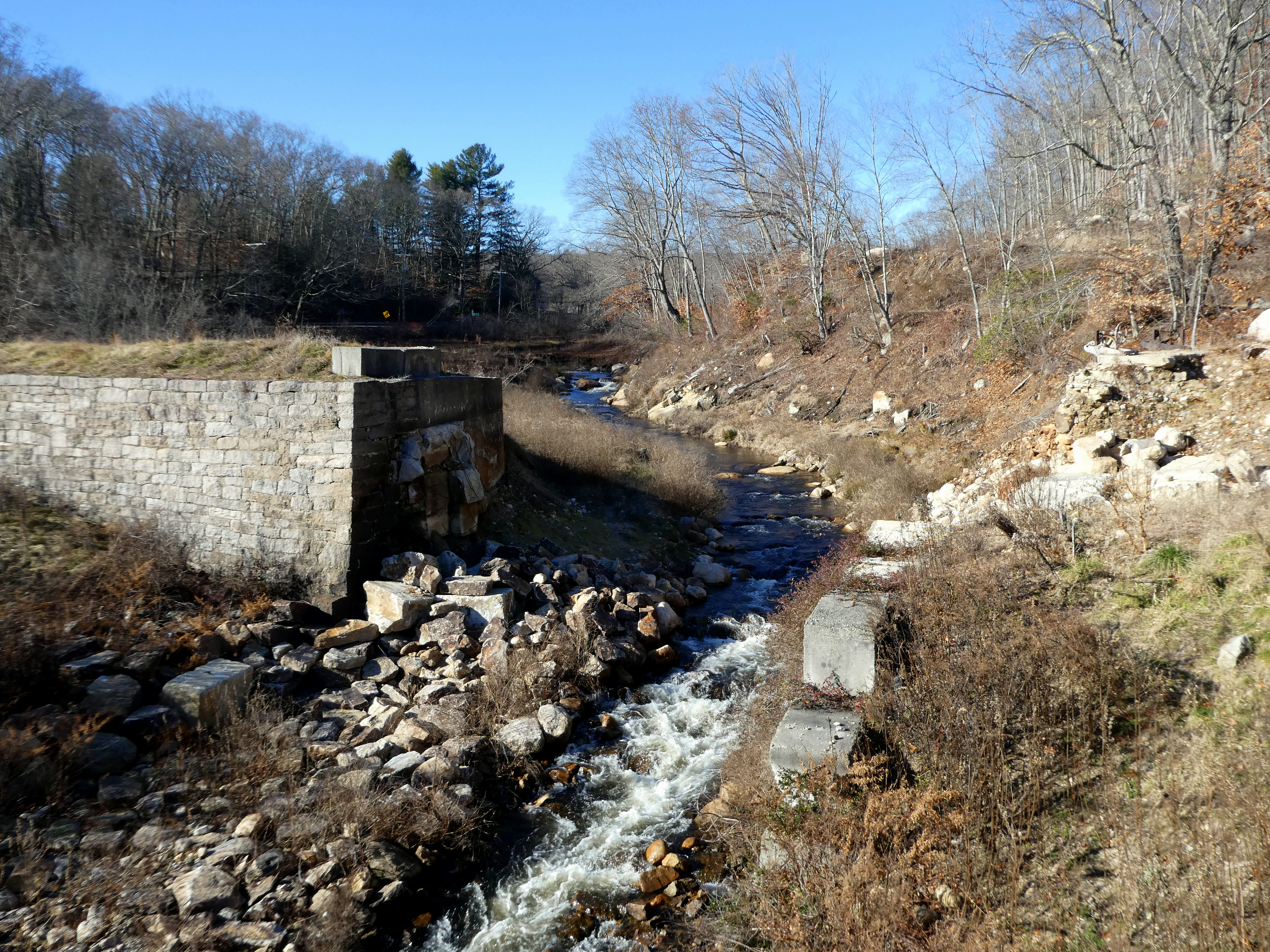
- Remains of a dam on the Oxoboxo River in Uncasville

Location
- Country: United States
- State: Connecticut
- Counties: New London

Physical characteristics
- Source: Oxoboxo Lake
  - location: Montville, Connecticut, United States
- Mouth: Thames River
  - location: Montville, New London County, Connecticut, United States
- Length: 6 mi (9.7 km)
- Basin size: 6,768 acres (2,739 ha)

The Oxoboxo River, /ˈɑːksoʊˌbɑːksoʊ/ shown on federal maps as Oxoboxo Brook, is a tributary of the Thames River in New London County, Connecticut. It flows roughly 6 miles (9.7 km) in a southeasterly direction from its source at Oxoboxo Lake to its confluence with the Thames. It has a watershed of 6,768 acres (27.39 km^{2}), 87% of which is in the town of Montville.

The Oxoboxo was an important source of water power during English colonial settlement and 19th-century European-American industrial development in Montville. Colonists built the first sawmill on the river in 1653. As of the 1880s, the river supplied power for 15 cotton, woolen, and paper mills, most of which had dams. The river's source, Oxoboxo Lake, is a natural lake whose size and elevation have been increased by damming. The earliest dam at Oxoboxo Lake was constructed in the 17th century; it has been rebuilt and increased in height several times since, reaching its current elevation in the 1880s. A dam adjacent to Connecticut Route 32 in Uncasville was removed in 2020 during redevelopment of the Uncasville Mill, which it formerly powered.

The name was derived from Algonquian languages of the area, which had terms for the river and lake. Other historical names for the stream and alternative spellings of "Oxoboxo" include Abscubogset, Absubogsuck, Cochikuack Brook, Cokichiwake, Cokikuak, Cuchickuwock, Okeshoksee, Okseboksce, Oxopaugsuck, Oxyboxy, and Sawmill Brook. Many are transliterations of the feature name in the Mohegan and other Algonquian languages of historical Native American tribes in the area.

== See also ==
- List of rivers of Connecticut
