= Uncasville, Connecticut =

Village in Montville, Connecticut, United States

Uncasville
- Village; Part of Montville
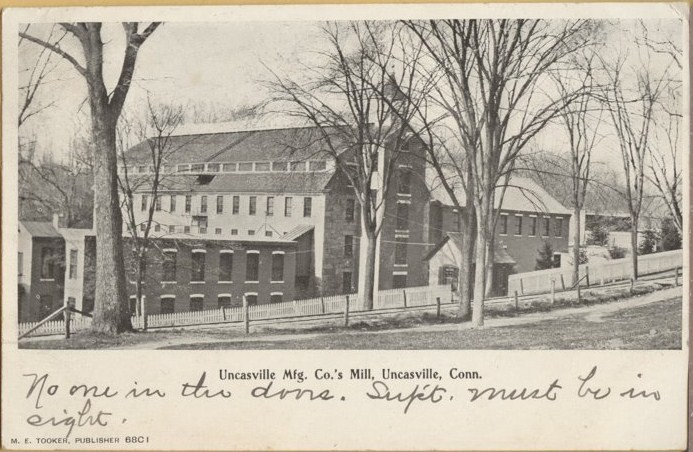
- Uncasville Mill in 1906

- Location within Connecticut Location within the United States
- Coordinates: 41°26′04″N 72°06′35″W
- Country: United States
- State: Connecticut
- County: New London
- Town: Montville
- Time zone: UTC-5 (Eastern (EST))
  - Summer (DST): UTC-4 (EDT)
- ZIP Code: 06382
- Area codes: 860 / 959

Uncasville is a village in the town of Montville, Connecticut, United States. It is located in southeastern Montville, at the mouth of the Oxoboxo River where it flows into the Thames River. The name is now applied more generally to all of the east end of Montville, which is the area served by the Uncasville ZIP Code (06382).

In 1994, the federal government officially recognized the Mohegan Indian Tribe of Connecticut, which had historically occupied this area as part of its traditional territory. That year Congress passed the Mohegan Nation (Connecticut) Land Claim Settlement Act. The Act authorized the United States to take land into trust in northeastern Montville for the Mohegan tribe's use as a reservation. Since gaining a reservation, in 1996 the tribe developed the Mohegan Sun casino resort. It has also built the Mohegan Sun Arena on their land. The Mohegan are one of the Native American peoples who speak Algonquian languages.

== History ==
Uncasville was named by English colonists for Uncas, the 17th-century Mohegan sachem who became their ally. The Mohegan, originally part of the Algonquian-speaking Pequot people, became independent through the 17th and 18th centuries. They allied with English colonists during the Pequot War of 1637. Uncas established a fortified village for defense, now known as Fort Shantok, on an elevated site next to the Thames River. He later welcomed English colonists to the Mohegan lands.

The European-American brothers John and Arthur Schofield established the first woolen mill in the United States in Uncasville. Their carding and spinning mill, dependent on water power, was located at the mouth of the Oxoboxo River. The Uncasville Manufacturing Corporation operated on the river into the early 20th century, as shown in the postcard image above.

In the 1950s, the Olin Mathieson Chemical Corporation established a large manufacturing facility in the Sandy Desert section in northeastern Montville. In 1961, it formed a joint venture, the United Nuclear Corporation, with Mallinckrodt Corporation of America, and Nuclear Development Corporation of America. They started with a total of 1400 employees, producing nuclear reactor fuel components for the United States Navy nuclear program. The site was near Trading Cove. Some parts of the program ended by 1976. After United Nuclear ceased its operations about 1990, the site was cleaned up of environmental hazards, decommissioned, and released for unrestricted use. The village designated this as a redevelopment area.

During the colonial period, agents had sold traditional lands originally occupied by the Mohegan people and reserved for them by the colony; they became landless. European Americans assumed they would assimilate to the more numerous majority. In the 20th century the Mohegan reorganized and sought federal recognition through the formal administrative process, submitting thorough documentation to prove their community and cultural continuity despite the lack of land. At the same time, beginning in the 1970s, they pursued a land claim against Connecticut for having been deprived illegally of their traditional lands.

In 1994, the U.S. Department of the Interior granted federal recognition to the Mohegan tribe. Several months later, the U.S. Congress passed the Mohegan Nation (Connecticut) Land Claim Settlement Act. It authorized the United States to take into trust the United Nuclear site for use as Mohegan reservation lands; with this, the law extinguished any other Mohegan land claims in Connecticut. In exchange, Congress approved the tribe undertaking gambling operations at the reservation site.

With its own reservation, the Mohegan developed gaming operations to generate revenue for tribal welfare. They opened the Mohegan Sun casino on October 12, 1996, near the former Fort Shantok site above the Thames River. It has since been expanded into a large resort with hotels and other facilities.

== Geography ==
Uncasville village is located in southeastern Montville near the confluence of the Oxoboxo and Thames rivers. All of eastern Montville, located on the western shore of the Thames, is served by the Uncasville ZIP code, 06382, and is also known as Uncasville. The U.S. Census Bureau treats Uncasville village as part of the Oxoboxo River census-designated place. The Mohegan Sun resort is about 3 miles (4.8 km) north of Uncasville village.

== Mohegan Sun ==
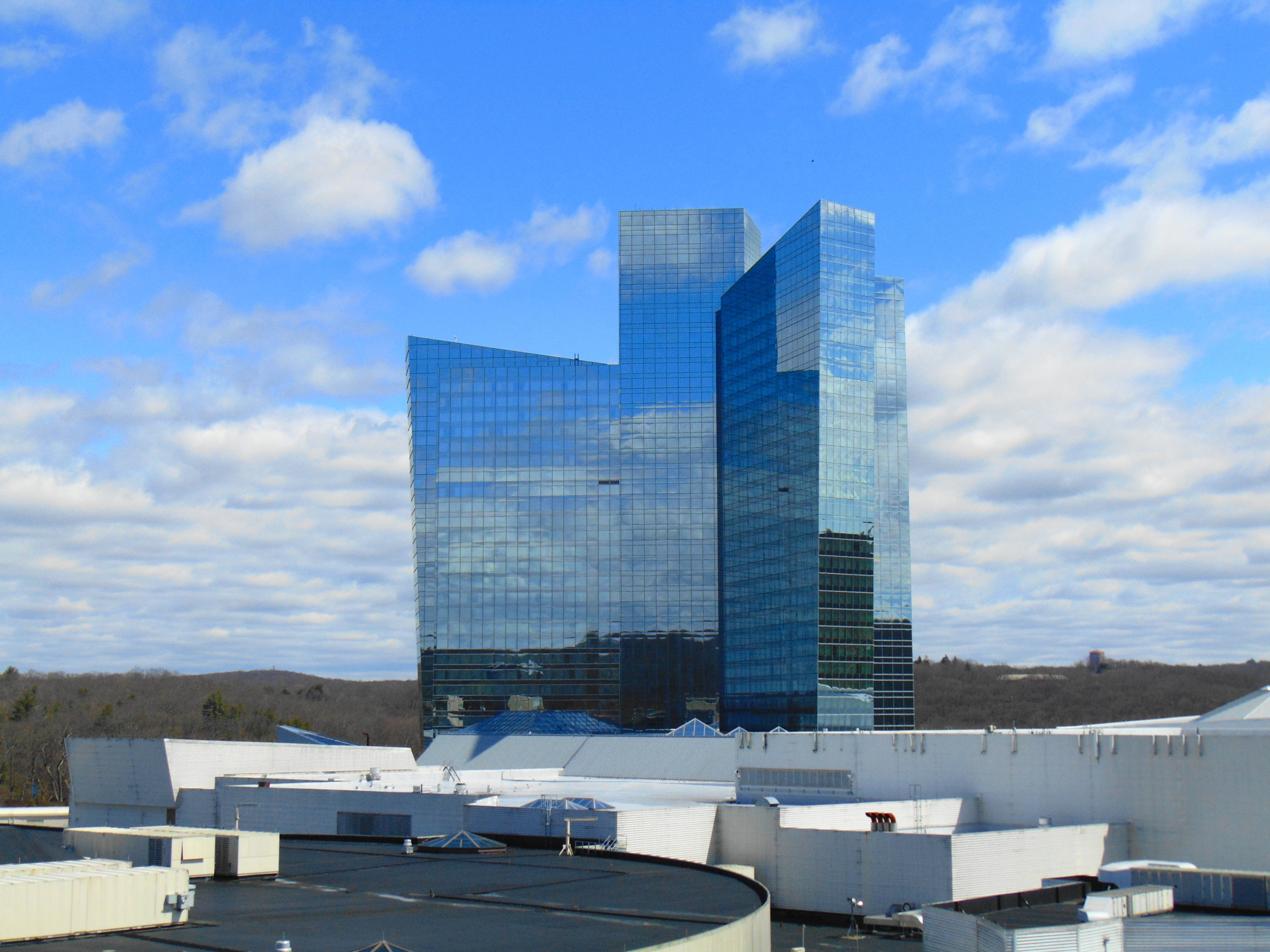
Sky Tower at Mohegan Sun

The Mohegan Sun casino in Uncasville, established in 1996, has become one of the largest casinos in the world. It has more than 250,000 square feet (23,000 m^{2}). The associated resort complex includes a luxury hotel, entertainment theater, and around 50 restaurants and 35 stores.

The Mohegan Sun Arena, located in the complex, hosts concerts and live sporting events. It can hold 10,000 people. It was the home court of the Connecticut Sun of the Women's National Basketball Association until the team's relocation to Houston.

== Notable person ==
- Melissa Tantaquidgeon Zobel, Mohegan historian
