= Montville High School (Connecticut) =

Location
- 800 Old Colchester Road; Oakdale, Connecticut 06370; United States
- Coordinates: 41°27′27″N 72°09′49″W

Information
- Type: Public
- School district: Montville Public Schools
- CEEB code: 070599
- NCES School ID: 090258000495
- Teaching staff: 53.20 (on FTE basis)
- Grades: 9 to 12
- Enrollment: 491 (2024–2025)
- Student to teacher ratio: 9.23
- Colors: Orange and black
- Athletics conference: Eastern Connecticut Conference
- Mascot: Wolves
- Website: www.montvilleschools.org/1/home

Montville High School is located in Oakdale, Connecticut and serves all communities belonging to the Montville School District. The student population comprises grades 9–12 and is typically about 800 students. The school is located near Leonard J. Tyl Middle School.

== Notable attendees ==
- Doug DuBose, American football player
- Leopoldo A. Quintas, U.S. Army lieutenant general
