= Montville Public Schools =

School district in Connecticut, United States

Address
- 800 Old Colchester Road Montville, Connecticut 06370 United States

District information
- Type: Public
- Grades: Pre-K-12

Montville Public Schools is the school district of Montville, Connecticut, United States.

== Schools ==
- Montville High School
- Leonard J. Tyl Middle School
- Mohegan Elementary School
- Dr. Charles E. Murphy Elementary School
- Oakdale Elementary School

== Mohegan Elementary School ==
Mohegan Elementary School is located at 49 Golden Rd, Montville, CT 06382.

It was opened in 1959 as a K-8 grade school for students who occupied the lands that had formerly comprised the Mohegan Reservation and its immediate surrounding area. The school was expanded in 1966 to accommodate the growth of the community. Mohegan Elementary School became a K-6 grade school in 1963. With the opening of Tyl Middle School in 1992, Mohegan then became a K-5 grade school.

A map of the school and the surrounding area
