= Irwindale Event Center =

Motorsport track in the United States

Irwindale Speedway & Event Center
“House of Drift”, “LA’s 1/2 Mile Super Speedway”
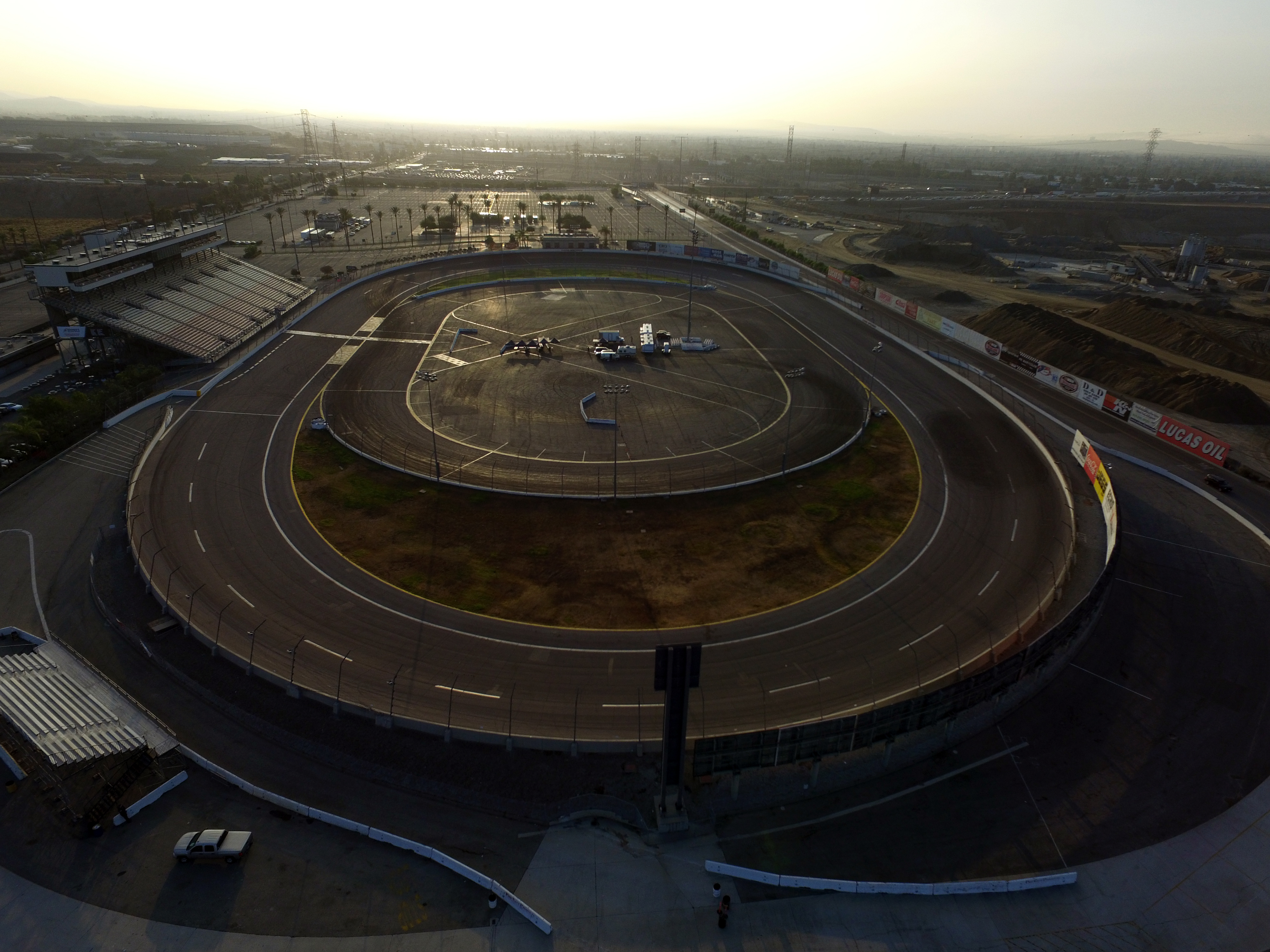
- Irwindale Speedway in 2016
- Location: Irwindale, California
- Coordinates: 34°6′34″N 117°59′17″W
- Capacity: 6,500 without portable seating
- Owner: Lindom Properties, Arcadia
- Operator: Tim Huddleston
- Opened: March 27, 1999; 27 years ago
- Closed: December 21, 2024; 22 months ago
- Former names: Irwindale Event Center (2012–2017); Toyota Speedway at Irwindale (2008–2011); Irwindale Speedway (1999–2007, 2018–2024)
- Major events: SRL Southwest Tour; Toyota All-Star Showdown (2006–2010, 2020–2024); ARCA Menards Series West; West Series races at Irwindale (1999–2011, 2014–2017, 2019–2024); Global Rallycross (2013); NASCAR Southwest Series (1999–2006); ASA National Tour (2001–2002)
- Website: http://www.irwindalespeedway.com

Oval (1999–2024)
- Surface: Asphalt
- Length: 0.500 mi (0.804 km)
- Turns: 4
- Banking: 6°, 9°, 12° (progressive)

The Irwindale Speedway & Event Center (informally "The House of Drift" ) was a motorsports facility in Irwindale, California, United States. It operated from 1999 to 2024 with banked, paved 1/2- and 1/3-mile oval tracks and a 1/8-mile drag strip.

It opened on March 27, 1999, as Irwindale Speedway. From 2008 until 2011, its official name was Toyota Speedway at Irwindale.

The track was primarily used for NASCAR races such as ARCA Menards Series West and Whelen All-American Series events until 2011, when NASCAR dropped the track from its schedule. The company that managed the track, Irwindale Speedway LLC, filed Chapter 7 bankruptcy on February 13, 2012.

In 2013, the track re-opened as the Irwindale Event Center, and hosted a Whelen All-American Series venue. Starting around 2015, the Formula D Championship Series held sold-out events at the venue. In 2015, plans were made to demolish the racetrack and build an outlet mall on the site. On August 9, 2017, Team 211 Entertainment CEO Jim Cohan announced plans to stop operating the track in January 2018. On December 29, 2017, track operations were taken over by Tim Huddleston, a former Irwindale Late Model driver and track champion, and K&N West team owner Bob Bruncatti.

On October 29, 2024, it was announced that the speedway and the drag strip would close the following December 21.

== History ==
=== 1999–2012 ===
Construction began in March 1998 on Irwindale's 6,500-seat grandstand and 1/2- and 1/3-mile ovals. Irwindale Speedway hoped to fill the void in the Los Angeles Basin left by the closures of the famed Riverside International Raceway, Ontario Motor Speedway and Saugus Speedway. The $7-million project was completed March 1999 and held its inaugural races on March 27, 1999. During the first practice session for a sprint car race, driver Casey Diemert hit the wall, flipped his car from turn 3 to turn 4, and died of head and neck injuries. Two other drivers would die while racing at the track: Keith Cowherd, a 1999 Speed Truck Challenge race, and John Baker during a 2002 NASCAR Featherlite Southwest Series race.

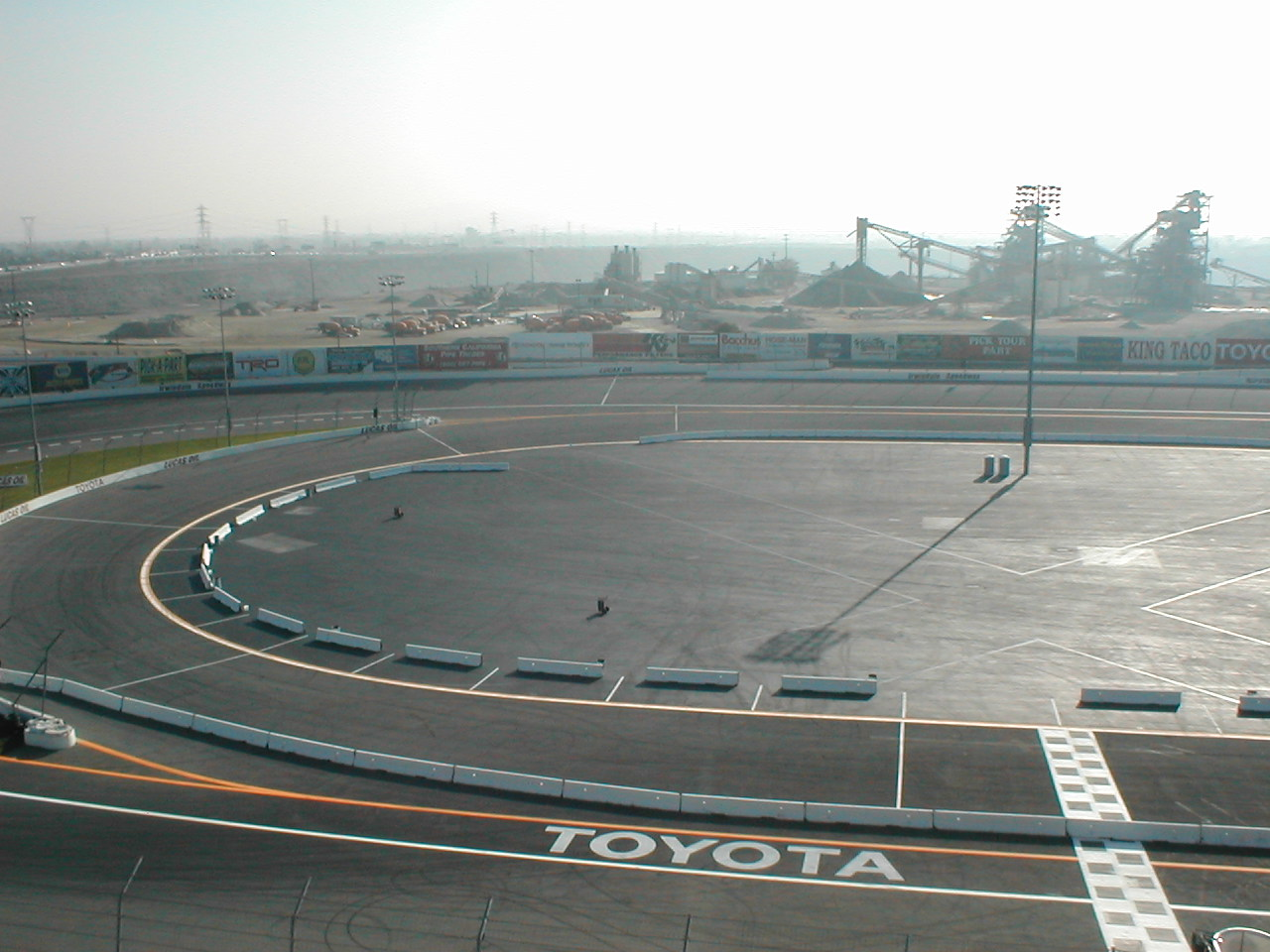
Irwindale Speedway as it was prepared for the 2006 Toyota All-Star Showdown

From 2003 to 2010, the main 1/2-mile oval hosted the NASCAR Toyota All-Star Showdown. In this event, the top 30 drivers in the NASCAR K&N Pro Series and the top 40 drivers in the NASCAR Whelen All-American Series come from their respective regional tours to compete in a "best-of-the-best" race. The races were televised live on the Speed Channel. It was also the home of the Turkey Night Grand Prix race, a Thanksgiving midget car racing tradition in southern California since 1934, when the race debuted at Gilmore Stadium. Among the 2005 participants were Tony Stewart, Jason Leffler, and J. J. Yeley. It was also seen in an episode of Malcolm in the Middle, titled "Stock Car Races", also used in the opening scene of the pilot episode of Fastlane and in Episode 25 of Fear Factor Season 3.

In 2012, Irwindale Speedway LLC, the management group that ran the track, filed for Chapter 7 bankruptcy on the same day track management canceled the 2012 racing season.

In the paperwork filed at the United States Bankruptcy Court, Central District, it shows that Irwindale Speedway LLC owed creditors $331,773.11. The largest amount is $150,000 owed on a personal-injury claim.

Irwindale Speedway LLC owed Nu-Way Industries Inc., the company that owns the property where the track and offices are built, $55,000 in rent.

Irwindale Speedway LLC has two more outstanding personal injury claims with unknown values. There is also a debt of $8,093.51 owed to the city of Irwindale Police Department, $16,379.58 owed to the Golden State Water Company and $1,437.50 owed to the San Gabriel Valley Tribune for advertising.

=== 2013–2017 ===
In late 2012, Jim Cohan, who ran the LA Driving Experience at the track was able to secure funding to re-open the speedway under his management. In September 2013, the property housing the Irwindale Event Center was purchased by Irwindale Outlet Partners, LLC for $22 million. The lease for the Irwindale Event Center continued on a year-by-year basis. In March 2015, plans were made to demolish Irwindale Speedway and replace it with Irwindale Outlet Center, an outlet mall, but the closure has been delayed. The track is currently running the 2017 season. On August 9, 2017, Cohan made an announcement in an e-mailed statement saying that the track was closing down officially in January 2018.

=== 2018–2024 ===
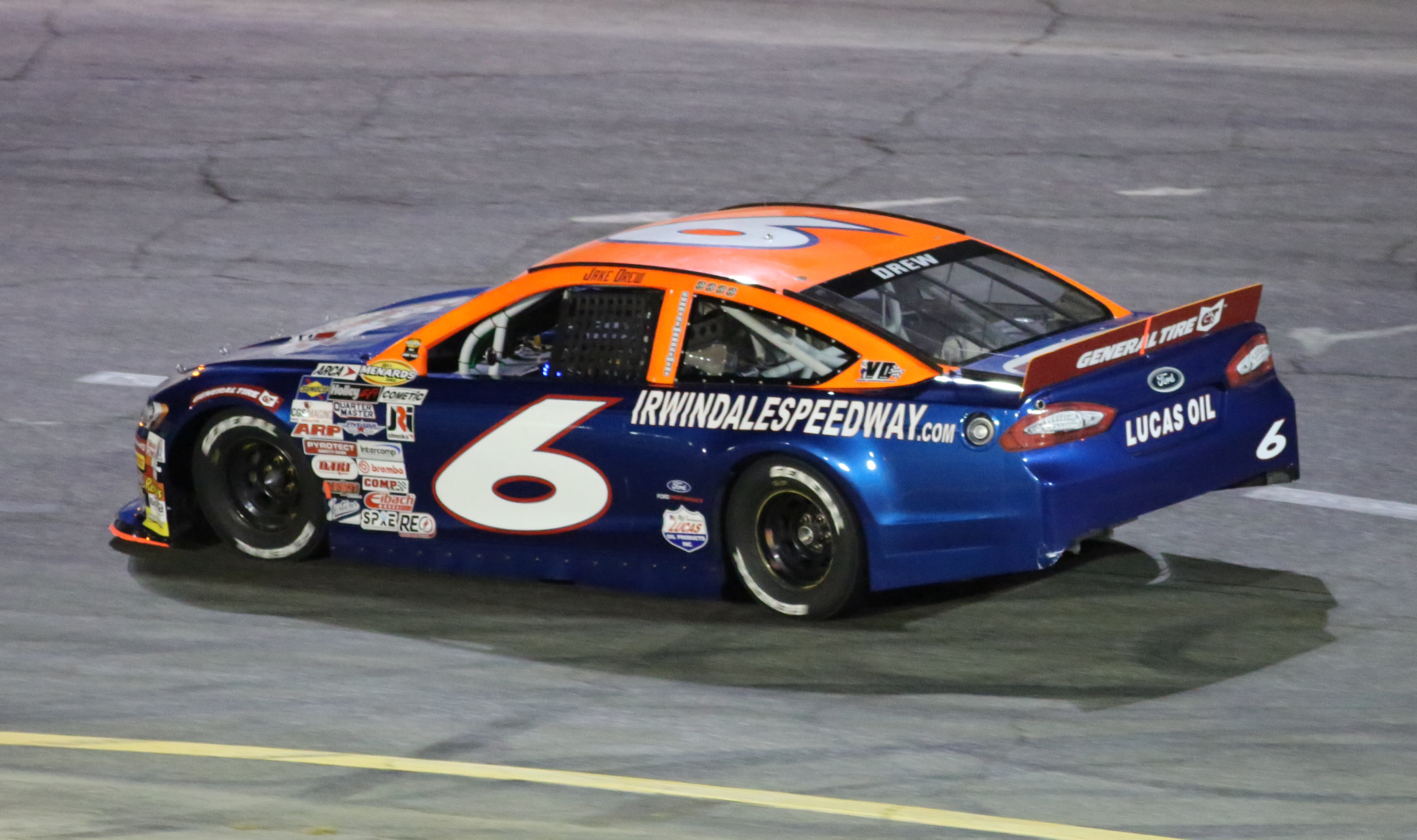
Jake Drew's No. 6 Irwindale Speedway sponsored car.

On December 29, 2017, it was announced that the track would not close in January 2018 as former Irwindale Late Model racer and track champion Tim Huddleston took over management of the speedway to have it remain open. In February 2020 Irwindale's famous All-Star Showdown returned to the track following a ten-year hiatus. The track remained open without spectators during the COVID-19 pandemic founding its own streaming service IrwindaleSpeedway.tv operated by Low Budget TV. In June 2021 fans returned to the track. At the 2024 West Coast Stock Car Motorsports Hall of Fame 150, a post-race incident happened when Sean Hingorani was caught on the hot mic swearing at owner Tim Huddleston.

=== Closing ===
On October 29, 2024, Huddleston officially announced that the speedway and drag-strip track would permanently close on December 21, 2024.

== Drag strip ==
The 1/8-mile drag racing strip opened on September 29, 2001. In 2003, in cooperation with local law enforcement, Irwindale Speedway opened its own dragstrip and hosts legal drag races for street-legal cars, trucks, and motorcycles. The dragstrip is proud to extinguish the "nowhere else to go" excuse used by illegal street racers, and local police often hand out flyers to offenders for free entry into drag races at the dragstrip to promote safe racing and has re-opened. The drag strip closed on December 21, 2024.

== The House of Drift ==
The venue was also known for drifting events. It hosted D1 Grand Prix's first overseas event in 2003, drawing a sell-out crowd of 10,000, breaking the record of 8,700. It became the series regular opening round in February. It also hosted a non-championship event in December and has hosted events in the domestic Formula D series. The venue had been expanded to accommodate 15,000 spectators. The circuit was regarded as one of the most popular courses for crowds and drivers despite the unforgiving concrete wall which drivers usually brush through with their rear bumpers. Because of its popularity, the circuit was nicknamed the House of Drift.

== Record ==
The 2003 Guinness Book of World Records lists the fastest-ever top speed of a radio-controlled car as 111 mph (178.63 km/h) set by Cliff Lett of Associated Electrics. Lett, a Team Associated professional driver and one of the designers and developers of the aforementioned RC10, set the record with a heavily modified Associated RC10L3 touring car at Irwindale Speedway on January 13, 2001.

== See also ==
- List of sports venues with the name Toyota
- West Coast Stock Car Hall of Fame
