= Apple Barrel 125 =

American stock car race

NASCAR K&N Pro Series East
- Venue: New Hampshire Motor Speedway
- Location: Loudon, New Hampshire, U.S
- Corporate sponsor: (none)
- First race: 1990
- Last race: 2019 (one of the NHMS races only)
- Distance: 74.06 (119.188 km)
- Laps: 70
- Previous names: Peak Antifreeze 125 (1990); New Hampshire Lottery Twin 125's (1991–1992); ADAP Doubleheader (1991); Auto Palace 150 (1992); TriState Megabucks Twin 125's (1993); Auto Palace / Slick 50 150 (1993–1994); New Hampshire 75 (1993); Tri-State Megabucks Twin 125's (1994–1996); NASCAR Doubleheader 125 (1994); Auto Palace 150 by Slick 50 (1995); NYNEX Yellow Pages NASCAR Doubleheader (1995); Stanley 100 (1996); Pennzoil 150 (1996); Pennzoil / VIP Discount Auto 125 (1996); United States Cellular 100 (1997); Pennzoil / VIP Discount Auto Tripleheader (1997–1998); Pennzoil / Replacement Auto Parts 125 (1997); CMT 100 (1997); Gumout Long Life Formula 100 (1998); Pennzoil / Replacement Auto Parts 100 (1998–1999); Farm Aid on CMT Doubleheader (1998); Busch 100 (1999); Pennzoil / VIP Discount Auto 100 (1999); New Hampshire 100 (1999); Busch 125 (2000, 2002); ThatLook.com 100 (2000); New Hampshire 125 (2000, 2002–2003, 2006, 2010–2011); CVS Pharmacy 125 Presented by Bayer (2001); New England 125 (2001–2007, 2010–2011); Siemens 125 (2004); Sylvania 125 Presented by Lowe's (2004–2005); Aubuchon Hardware 125 presented by Hardwarestore.com (2007); Heluva Good! 125 (2008); Heluva Good! Fall 125 (2008–2009); Heluva Good! Summer 125 (2009); G-Oil 100 (2012); North American Power 100 (2013); Granite State 100 (2014); United Site Services 70 (2015–2019); Apple Barrel 125 (2018-present)

Circuit information
- Surface: Asphalt
- Length: 1.058 mi (1.703 km)
- Turns: 4

The Apple Barrel 125 was a NASCAR K&N Pro Series East race held annually at New Hampshire Motor Speedway.

The track held a second race in the month of September, the Apple Barrel 125, for two years in 2018 and 2019. For the 2020 season, the track was reduced back down to one race, which was this one, and the United Site Services 70, the original race at the track that was run in July each year, was dropped.

In 1996, 2000, 2013 and 2014, the United Site Services 70 (in July) was a 105.8-mile (170.3 km) race. From 2015 through 2019, the race was 70 laps 74.06 miles (119.19 km) long. The Apple Barrel 125 has always been a 125-mile (201 km)-long event.

== Past winners ==
Year	Date	No.	Driver	Team	Manufacturer	Race distance		Race time	Average speed (mph)
Year	Date	No.	Driver	Team	Manufacturer	Laps	Miles (km)	Race time	Average speed (mph)
1990	September 2	51	Mike McLaughlin	Greci Motorsports	Oldsmobile	125	132.2 (212.755)	1:30:24	87.78
1991	April 14	9	Joe Bessey	Joe Bessey Motorsports	Oldsmobile (2)	125	132.2 (212.755)	1:36:59	81.818
1991	August 25	25	Ricky Craven	Craven Racing	Chevrolet	150	158.7 (255.402)	1:27:34	108.74
1992	May 3	51	Mike McLaughlin (2, 3)	Greci Motorsports (2, 3)	Oldsmobile (3, 4)	125	132.2 (212.755)	1:37:02	81.776
1992	September 20	51	Mike McLaughlin (2, 3)	Greci Motorsports (2, 3)	Oldsmobile (3, 4)	150	158.7 (255.402)	1:39:28	97.073
1993	May 2	41	Jamie Aube	Mountain Racing	Chevrolet (2)	125	132.2 (212.755)	1:25:27	92.861
1993	July 10	51	Mike McLaughlin (4)	Greci Motorsports (4)	Oldsmobile (5)	150	158.7 (255.402)	1:38:23	96.839
1993	August 7	47	Kelly Moore (1, 2)	Richard Moore Racing (1, 2)	Chevrolet (3, 4)	75	79.4 (127.781)	0:54:02	88.112
1994	April 17	47	Kelly Moore (1, 2)	Richard Moore Racing (1, 2)	Chevrolet (3, 4)	125	132.2 (212.755)	1:34:52	83.629
1994	July 9	56	Martin Truex Sr.	Blount Seafood Racing	Oldsmobile (6)	150	158.7 (255.402)	1:54:16	83.331
1994	September 25	97	Joe Bessey (2)	Joe Bessey Motorsports (2)	Chevrolet (5)	125	132.2 (212.755)	1:30:50	87.358
1995	April 9	09	Mike Stefanik	Mountain Racing (2)	Oldsmobile (7)	125	132.2 (212.755)	1:27:40	90.513
1995	July 8	20	Ricky Craven (2)	Craven Racing (2)	Chevrolet (6)	125*	132.2 (212.755)	1:37:00	81.804
1995	September 24	1	Joe Bessey (3)	Joe Bessey Motorsports (3)	Chevrolet (7)	125	132.2 (212.755)	1:25:11	93.152
1996	June 2	09	Steve Park	Mountain Racing (3)	Oldsmobile (8)	125	132.2 (212.755)	1:37:00	81.804
1996	July 12	55	Brad Leighton	Grizco Racing	Chevrolet (8)	100	105.8 (170.268)	1:02:00	102.387
1996	September 7	60	Dale Shaw	Ocean Spray Racing	Chevrolet (9)	150	158.7 (255.402)	1:38:41	96.049
1996	September 8	13	Ted Christopher	Lestorti Racing	Chevrolet (10)	125	132.2 (212.755)	1:29:34	88.593
1997	May 10	29	Dave Dion	Dave Dion Racing	Ford	103*	110.1 (177.188)	1:10:50	92.307
1997	May 31	60	Dale Shaw (2)	Ocean Spray Racing (2)	Pontiac	105*	111.1 (178.798)	1:14:44	89.149
1997	July 12	15	Jerry Marquis	O'Connor Racing	Chevrolet (11)	125	132.2 (212.755)	1:21:36	97.243
1997	September 13	13	Ted Christopher (2)	Lestorti Racing (2)	Chevrolet (12)	100	105.8 (170.268)	1:04:58	97.712
1998	May 9	47	Kelly Moore (3, 4)	Richard Moore Racing (3, 4)	Pontiac (2, 3)	100	105.8 (170.268)	0:59:11	107.026
1998	July 11	47	Kelly Moore (3, 4)	Richard Moore Racing (3, 4)	Pontiac (2, 3)	100	105.8 (170.268)	1:13:03	86.899
1998	August 2	60	Dale Shaw (3)	Dale Shaw	Ford (2)	100	105.8 (170.268)	1:12:55	87.058
1998	August 29	13	Ted Christopher (3)	Marsh Racing	Chevrolet (13)	100	105.8 (170.268)	1:15:43	83.839
1999	May 8	55	Brad Leighton (2)	Grizco Racing (2)	Chevrolet (14)	103*	110.1 (177.188)	1:14:45	87.471
1999	July 10	44	Andy Santerre	Andy Santerre Racing	Chevrolet (15)	100	105.8 (170.268)	0:59:24	106.869
1999	August 1	42	Tom Carey, Jr.	Kevin Banning	Chevrolet (16)	100	105.8 (170.268)	1:05:49	96.45
1999	September 18	55	Brad Leighton (3, 4)	Grizco Racing (3, 4)	Chevrolet (17, 18)	101*	106.9 (172.038)	1:18:23	81.796
2000	May 13	55	Brad Leighton (3, 4)	Grizco Racing (3, 4)	Chevrolet (17, 18)	125	132.2 (212.755)	1:37:31	81.271
2000	July 8	56	Martin Truex Jr.	SeaWatch Racing	Chevrolet (19)	101*	106.9 (172.038)	1:20:45	79.399
2000	September 16	44	Andy Santerre (2)	Andy Santerre Racing (2)	Chevrolet (20)	131*	138.6 (223.055)	1:34:17	88.201
2001	May 12	13	Ted Christopher (4)	Lestorti Racing (3)	Chevrolet (21)	125	132.2 (212.755)	1:13:09	108.476
2001	July 21	55	Brad Leighton (5, 6, 7)	Grizco Racing (5, 6, 7)	Chevrolet (22, 23, 24)	125	132.2 (212.755)	1:18:43	100.845
2002	May 11	55	Brad Leighton (5, 6, 7)	Grizco Racing (5, 6, 7)	Chevrolet (22, 23, 24)	130*	137.5 (221.349)	1:42:30	80.511
2002	July 20	55	Brad Leighton (5, 6, 7)	Grizco Racing (5, 6, 7)	Chevrolet (22, 23, 24)	125	132.2 (212.755)	1:21:52	96.926
2002	September 14	14	Tracy Gordon	Tracy Gordon	Chevrolet (25)	137*	144.9 (233.193)	1:31:15	95.307
2003	July 19	56	Martin Truex Jr. (2)	SeaWatch Racing (2)	Chevrolet (26)	125	132.2 (212.755)	1:28:03	90.119
2003	September 13	35	Brad Leighton (8)	NDS Motorsports	Ford (3)	128*	135.4 (217.905)	1:30:43	89.569
2004	July 24	32	Dale Quarterley	Dale Quarterley Racing	Chevrolet (27)	125	132.2 (212.755)	1:25:31	92.087
2004	September 20	6	Andy Santerre (3)	Joe Bessey Motorsports (4)	Chevrolet (28)	125	132.2 (212.755)	1:58:32	68.757
2005	July 15	55	Mike Stefanik (2)	Grizco Racing (8)	Chevrolet (29)	125	132.2 (212.755)	1:22:31	95.435
2005	September 16	35	Ted Christopher (5)	NDS Motorsports (2)	Ford (4)	119*	125.9 (202.616)	1:36:57	77.329
2006	July 14	61	Mike Olsen	Mike Olsen Racing	Chevrolet (30)	125	132.2 (212.755)	1:32:11	85.428
2006	September 16	47	Kelly Moore (5)	Richard Moore Racing (5)	Chevrolet (31)	104*	110.0 (177.027)	1:34:40	69.211
2007	June 29	20	Joey Logano (1, 2)	Joe Gibbs Racing (1, 2)	Chevrolet (32, 33)	126*	132.49 (213.221)	2:00:55	66.149
2007	September 14	20	Joey Logano (1, 2)	Joe Gibbs Racing (1, 2)	Chevrolet (32, 33)	125	132.2 (212.755)	1:17:01	103.003
2008	June 27	71	Eddie MacDonald (1, 2)	Grimm Racing (1, 2)	Chevrolet (34, 35)	127*	134.0 (215.652)	1:39:31	81.011
2008	September 13	71	Eddie MacDonald (1, 2)	Grimm Racing (1, 2)	Chevrolet (34, 35)	125	132.2 (212.755)	1:25:14	93.097
2009	June 26	18	Matt DiBenedetto	Joe Gibbs Racing (3)	Toyota	125	132.2 (212.755)	1:31:01	87.182
2009	September 18	71	Eddie MacDonald (3)	Grimm Racing (3)	Chevrolet (36)	99*	104.7 (168.498)	1:18:16	80.296
2010	June 25	00	Ryan Truex (1, 2)	Michael Waltrip Racing (1, 2)	Toyota (2, 3)	125	132.2 (212.755)	1:28:21	89.813
2010	September 17	00	Ryan Truex (1, 2)	Michael Waltrip Racing (1, 2)	Toyota (2, 3)	136*	143.8 (231.423)	1:52:29	76.752
2011	July 15	18	Max Gresham	Joe Gibbs Racing (4)	Toyota (4)	125	132.2 (212.755)	1:41:32	78.152
2011	September 23	00	Brett Moffitt	Michael Waltrip Racing (3)	Toyota (5)	78*	82.5 (132.770)	0:54:12	91.355
2012	September 22	6	Kyle Larson	Rev Racing	Toyota (6)	100	105.8 (170.268)	1:20:29	78.873
2013	September 21	00	Cole Custer	Ken Schrader Racing	Chevrolet (37)	105*	109.122 (175.614)	1:42:38	64.944
2014	July 11	97	Jesse Little	Team Little Racing	Chevrolet (38)	100	105.8 (170.268)	1:24:42	74.947
2015	July 17	9	William Byron	HScott Motorsports	Chevrolet (39)	70	74.06 (119.188)	0:43:12	102.861
2016	July 16	41	Corey LaJoie	Ranier Racing with MDM	Chevrolet (40)	72*	76.176 (122.593)	0:50:45	90.006
2017	July 15	16	Todd Gilliland	Bill McAnally Racing	Toyota (7)	70	74.06 (119.188)	0:39:45	111.789
2018	July 21	17	Tyler Ankrum	DGR-Crosley	Toyota (8)	70	74.06 (119.188)	0:35:33	124.996
2018	September 22	74	Brandon McReynolds	Visconti Motorsports	Chevrolet (41)	129*	136.482 (219.646)	1:21:38	100.313
2019	July 19	4	Chase Cabre	Rev Racing (2)	Toyota (9)	70	74.06 (119.188)	0:43:12	102.861
2019	September 21	54	Ty Gibbs	DGR-Crosley (2)	Toyota (10)	125	132.25 (212.835)	1:16:53	103.208
2020	Not held								

- 1995 (1 of 3), 2005 (1 of 2), 2011 (1 of 2): race shortened due to rain.
- 1997 (2 of 4), 1999 (2 of 4), 2000 (2 of 3), 2002 (2 of 3), 2007 (1 of 2), 2008 (1 of 2), 2010 (1 of 2), 2013, 2016 and 2018 (1 of 2): race extended due to overtime.
- 2006 (1 of 2): race shortened due to time constraints.
- 2009 (1 of 2): race shortened due to rain/darkness.
- 2020: Race cancelled due to the COVID-19 pandemic.
