= Ward Burton =

American racing driver

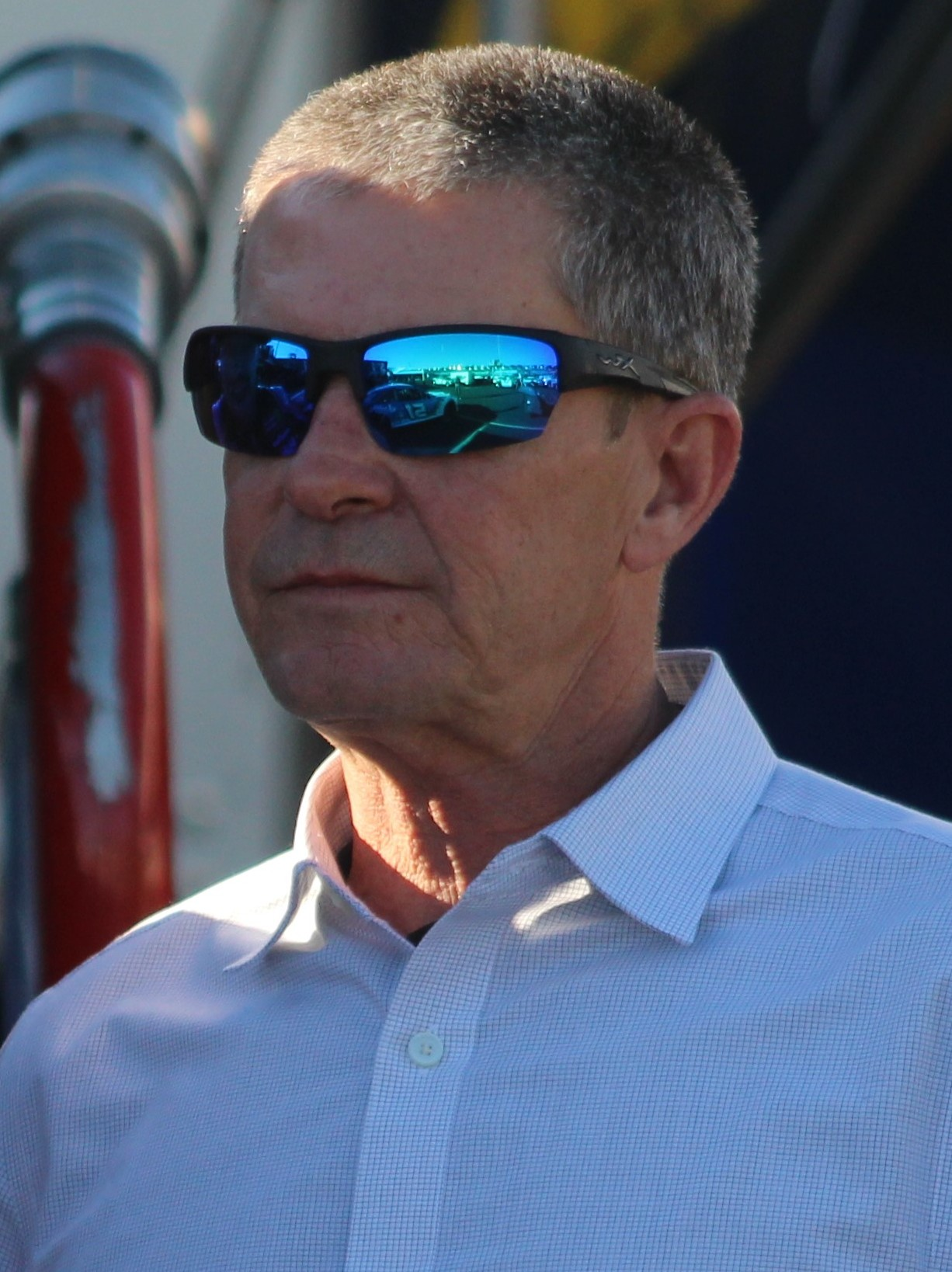
- Burton in 2019
- Born: John Edward Burton III; October 25, 1961 (age 65); South Boston, Virginia, U.S.
- Achievements: 2002 Daytona 500 Winner; 2001 Southern 500 Winner; Led Busch Series in poles in 1993

NASCAR Cup Series career
- 375 races run over 13 years
- Best finish: 9th (1999)
- First race: 1994 Pontiac Excitement 400 (Richmond)
- Last race: 2007 Subway 500 (Martinsville)
- First win: 1995 AC Delco 400 (Rockingham)
- Last win: 2002 New England 300 (Loudon)
Wins	Top tens	Poles
5	82	7

NASCAR O'Reilly Auto Parts Series career
- 161 races run over 10 years
- Best finish: 6th (1993)
- First race: 1990 Pontiac 200 (Richmond)
- Last race: 2007 Carfax 250 (Michigan)
- First win: 1992 Goodwrench 200 (Rockingham)
- Last win: 1993 Slick 50 300 (Atlanta)
Wins	Top tens	Poles
4	50	7

NASCAR FedEx Freight Truck Series career
- 1 race run over 1 year
- Best finish: 59th (2012)
- First race: 2012 NextEra Energy Resources 250 (Daytona)
Wins	Top tens	Poles
0	1	0
- Statistics up to date as of April 17, 2013.

John Edward Burton III (born October 25, 1961) is an American former professional stock car racing driver. He has five career wins in the NASCAR Winston Cup Series, including the 2002 Daytona 500 and the 2001 Southern 500. A member of the Burton racing family, he is the older brother of fellow NASCAR driver and NASCAR on NBC broadcaster Jeff Burton, the father of current NASCAR O'Reilly Auto Parts Series driver Jeb Burton, and the uncle of current O'Reilly Auto Parts Series driver Harrison Burton. He currently operates the Ward Burton Wildlife Foundation, a conservation and sportsmans' organization.

== NASCAR career ==
=== NASCAR Busch Series career ===
Burton began his NASCAR Busch Series career in the 1990 season and competed full-time for four seasons. In his first season, he had 23 starts with three top-ten finishes, ending the season in 21st place. His results improved steadily over the next three years. For his second season, he had 29 starts with two top-five finishes and ten top-ten finishes, completing the season in eighteenth place.

Burton's third season in 1992 brought his first win on February 29 at Rockingham in the No. 27 Gwaltney car owned by Alan Dillard. He completed the season in eighth place overall with one win, three top-five finishes and ten top-ten finishes. His final full-time season in 1993 brought three more wins, nine top-fives, and ten top-tens, ending up in sixth place in the final points standings. In 1995, Burton started driving for Buz McCall in the No. 95 Caterpillar Inc. Chevrolet after John Tanner was released. He drove for Bill Davis Racing in 1996 for eight starts in the No. 22 MBNA-sponsored Pontiac. Burton did not start another Busch Series race until 1999 when he ran five more races for Bill Davis with a sponsorship from Siemens. He accumulated three top-five and five top-ten finishes including a second-place finish at Dover. He also ran one race for Innovative Motorsports and their No. 47 Chevrolet.

In 2000, Burton ran five more races for Davis with sponsorship from Polaris Inc. and one race with Innovative Motorsports. He then ran two races in 2001 for Tommy Baldwin Jr.'s new team with Pillsbury sponsorship.

On January 2, 2007, Brewco Motorsports announced Burton would drive the No. 27 Kleenex Ford Fusion in the Busch Series in 2007. Burton was to drive twenty races for Brewco Motorsports and Kleenex, beginning with the Orbitz 300 at Daytona International Speedway. He was released late in the season.

=== NASCAR Cup career ===
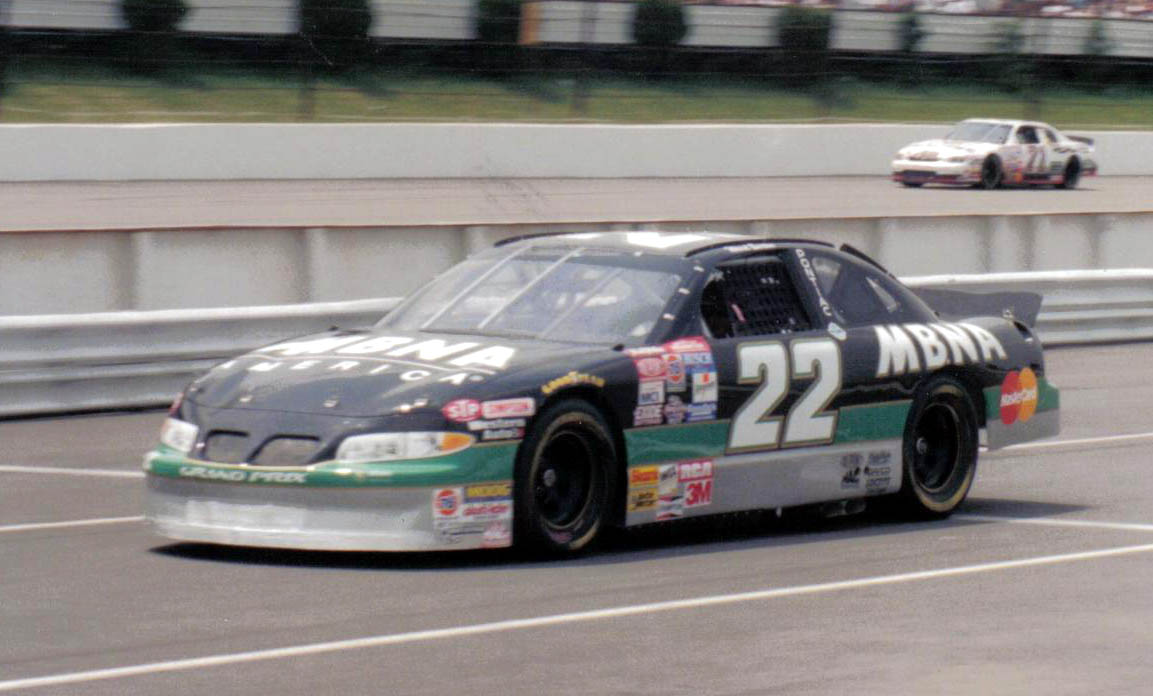
Burton's 1997 MBNA racecar

=== 1994–1999 ===
Burton moved up to the Winston Cup Series in 1994. He ran 26 of 31 races in the No. 31 Hardee's Chevy for A.G. Dillard Motorsports, winning his first career pole at Charlotte Motor Speedway and finishing 35th in the standings. He returned to the No. 31 ride in 1995 but he was released on August 20, one day after finishing sixth at Michigan. The next weekend at Bristol, he moved to the No. 22 Bill Davis Racing MBNA Pontiac after 21 races, and he won the AC-Delco 400 at Rockingham toward the end of that season. Caterpillar became the new primary sponsor for the car in 1999, when he picked up a career high ninth place points finish, with six top-five finishes and sixteen top-ten finishes. He scored three second place finishes that season, at Las Vegas, Darlington and Rockingham, and on all three occasions brother Jeff won the race.

=== 2000–2007 ===
In the 2000 season, he won the Mall.com 400 at Darlington Raceway and had seventeen top-ten finishes to finish tenth in the final points standings. Bill Davis Racing switched to Dodge in the next season, when he won the Southern 500 at Darlington Raceway and had ten top-ten finishes to finish fourteenth in the final points standings. Burton had also led the most laps in that year's Daytona 500 but retired after 173 laps after having been involved in the Big One.

In the 2002 Daytona 500, Burton drove among the lead cars and was among the lead pack late in the race. However, he took the lead because Sterling Marlin, who was in front of him at the time, climbed out of his car and tried to fix a damaged right-front fender during a red flag, drawing a penalty as repairs are prohibited during red flag conditions except for non-points paying races. As Marlin was sent to the back of the field at the restart, Burton inherited the lead and maintained it, holding off Elliott Sadler and Geoff Bodine for the win.

He also won the New England 300 at New Hampshire but due to numerous mechanical failures, he fell to 25th in the point standings, but after his win in Loudon, however, 2002 would mark the first and only time in his career that he would win multiple races in a single season. At Bristol, he was involved in a wreck where Dale Earnhardt Jr. bumped into him, and sent him spinning into the wall. Burton responded by throwing his heel pads at Earnhardt's car. 2003 was a season of poorer finishes for Burton. He only had four top-tens, and he left Bill Davis Racing with four races left in the season to begin driving the No. 0 NetZero Pontiac for Haas CNC Racing. He finished the season 21st in the final points standings.

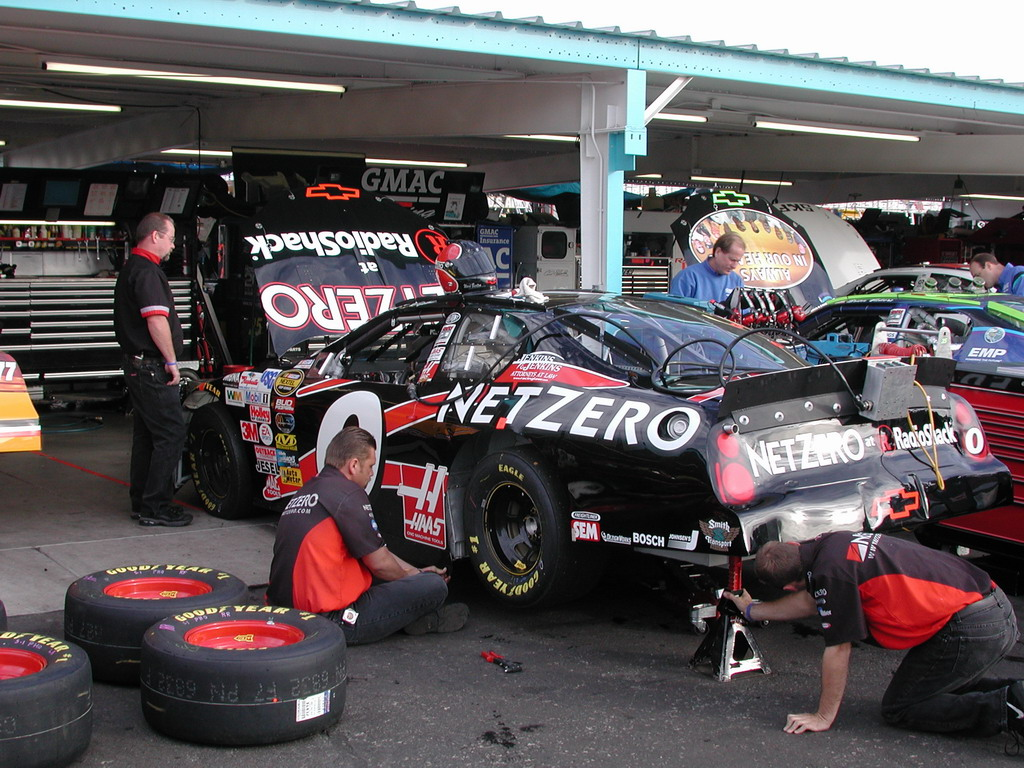
Burton's crew working on his 2004 car

In the 2004 season, Burton raced Haas CNC Racing's No. 0 NetZero HiSpeed car to three top-ten finishes but was released from the team with two races left in the season. He spent the next two seasons as a free agent. He returned to the Nextel Cup Series late in the 2006 season, driving the No. 4 Lucas Oil Chevrolet for Morgan–McClure Motorsports. His first race with the team was the Subway 500 at Martinsville Speedway on October 22, 2006. He started 35th and finished 26th as the last car on the lead lap. On November 5, 2006 at Texas Motor Speedway in his next driving opportunity, he started 37th and finished 25th. On December 12, Burton signed with Morgan-McClure Motorsports to drive the No. 4 car full-time in 2007. That year, his performance was lackluster, posting a best finish of fourteenth. On November 12, he was released from Morgan-McClure Motorsports so that the team could "evaluate performance." Morgan-McClure closed up shop shortly afterward.

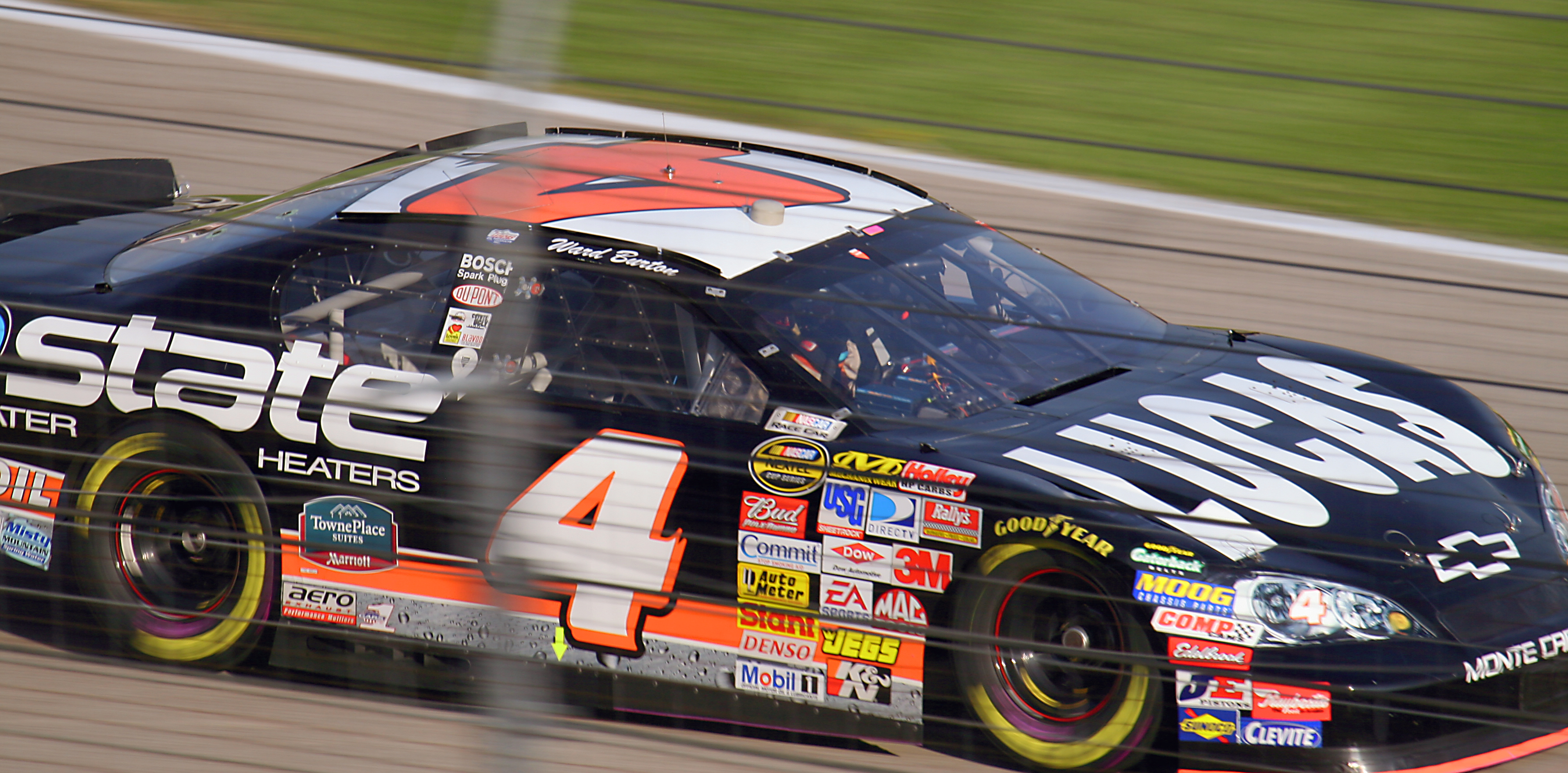
Burton's No. 4 car in 2007

Following his release, Burton did not officially retire; however, it was not until 2012 that he returned to NASCAR, signing with Hillman Racing to run in the season-opening Camping World Truck Series race at Daytona International Speedway, as well as selected races later in the year as a teammate to his son Jeb.

Burton joined Turner Scott Motorsports as a driver coach for the team starting in 2013, where he assisted with driver development for the Nationwide and Camping World Truck Series teams. However, just prior to the start of the 2014 season, the primary sponsor of the team defaulted on a payment, and the team was shut down.

== Virginia Board of Game and Inland Fisheries ==
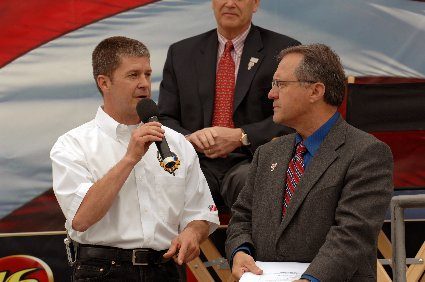
Burton (left) in 2007

On November 1, 2005, then Virginia Governor Mark Warner appointed Burton to the Virginia Board of Wildlife Resources. As a resident of Halifax County, Virginia, Burton assumed the seat on the board for Virginia's 5th Congressional District that was formerly held by C. Wilson McNeely, IV, who resigned after six years of service.

Burton, an avid sportsman and conservationist, is the founder and president of the Ward Burton Wildlife Foundation, and he has been a spokesperson for Virginia's 34 state parks since 2003.

=== Further achievements in conservation ===
- The Governor's Environmental Excellence Award, 2008.
- Honorary co-leader of the Virginia Museum of Natural History in Martinsville fundraising efforts.
- Partner with the Natural Resources Conservation Service to create awareness for the need to protect and create additional wetlands in America.
- Involved with the 4-H clubs in Alabama and Virginia through PSAs and assisting 4-H clubs to conduct wildlife enhancement programs on Foundation land.

== Personal life ==
Burton was born in Danville, Virginia but considers South Boston, Virginia his hometown. In January 1990, Burton married a young widow named Tabitha Conner (née Throckmorton). Burton and Tabitha, have three children: Sarah (Tabitha's daughter whom Burton adopted), Jeb, and Ashton. His nephew is Alexander Burton. He owns several thousand acres of hunting land in rural Virginia close to his hometown of South Boston, Virginia. He also has a home in Nags Head, North Carolina.

Burton's family ancestry can be traced back through Colonial Virginia where the landing of his earliest ancestor Richard Burton came over to the Jamestown Colony. He currently serves as a member of the Board of Directors for the Patrick Henry Memorial Foundation in Brookneal, Virginia.

== Motorsports career results ==
=== NASCAR ===
(key) (Bold – Pole position awarded by qualifying time. Italics – Pole position earned by points standings or practice time. * – Most laps led.)

==== Nextel Cup Series ====
NASCAR Nextel Cup Series results
Year	Team	No.	Make	1	2	3	4	5	6	7	8	9	10	11	12	13	14	15	16	17	18	19	20	21	22	23	24	25	26	27	28	29	30	31	32	33	34	35	36	NNCC	Pts	Ref
1994	A.G. Dillard Motorsports	31	Chevy	DAY; DNQ	CAR; DNQ	RCH; 35	ATL; 40	DAR; 21	BRI; 25	NWS; DNQ	MAR; 16	TAL; DNQ	SON; 36	CLT; 37	DOV; 37	POC; 42	MCH; 29	DAY; 36	NHA; 42	POC; 2	TAL; DNQ	IND; 31	GLN; 24	MCH; 29	BRI; 36	DAR; 34	RCH; 25	DOV; 27	MAR; 35	NWS; 18	**CLT**; 41	CAR; 9	PHO; 21	ATL; 41						35th	1971	
1995	A.G. Dillard Motorsports	31	Chevy	DAY; 15	CAR; 9	RCH; 22	ATL; DNQ	DAR; 25	BRI; 21	NWS; 24	MAR; 25	TAL; 32	SON; 21	CLT; 41	DOV; 38	POC; 19	MCH; 18	DAY; 35	NHA; 39	POC; 11	TAL; 20	IND; 35	GLN; 19	MCH; 6																22nd	2926	
1995	Bill Davis Racing	22	Pontiac																						BRI; 34	DAR; 4	RCH; 11	DOV; 21	MAR; 21	NWS; DNQ	CLT; 7	CAR; 1	PHO; 42	ATL; 5						22nd	2926	
1996	Bill Davis Racing	22	Pontiac	DAY; 26	CAR; 41	RCH; 13	ATL; 15	**DAR**; 38	BRI; 33	NWS; DNQ	MAR; DNQ	TAL; 27	SON; 10	CLT; 11	DOV; 16	POC; 35	MCH; 35	DAY; 41	NHA; 25	POC; 22	TAL; 33	IND; 36	GLN; 32	MCH; 35	BRI; 8	DAR; 40	RCH; 37	DOV; 7	MAR; DNQ	NWS; DNQ	CLT; 7	CAR; 17	PHO; 22	ATL; 12						33rd	2411	
1997	Bill Davis Racing	22	Pontiac	DAY; 8	CAR; 23	RCH; 24	ATL; 12	DAR; 18	TEX; 7	BRI; 18	MAR; 18	SON; 10	TAL; 42	CLT; 36	DOV; 34	POC; 38*	MCH; 35	CAL; 28	DAY; 26	NHA; 36	POC; 15	IND; 19	GLN; 41	MCH; 28	BRI; 17	DAR; 27	RCH; 7	NHA; 23	DOV; 22	**MAR**; 7	CLT; 8	TAL; DNQ	CAR; 26	PHO; 42	ATL; 9					24th	2987	
1998	Bill Davis Racing	22	Pontiac	DAY; 25	CAR; 11	LVS; 18	ATL; 24	DAR; 11	BRI; 17	TEX; 15	MAR; 28	TAL; 8	CAL; 12	CLT; 34	DOV; 29	RCH; 19	**MCH**; 8	POC; 24	SON; 40	NHA; 23	**POC**; 34	IND; 34	GLN; 21	MCH; 37	BRI; 37	NHA; 31	DAR; 12	RCH; 28	DOV; 33	MAR; 11	CLT; 2	TAL; 30	DAY; 7	PHO; 14	CAR; 7	ATL; 14				16th	3352	
1999	Bill Davis Racing	22	Pontiac	DAY; 24	CAR; 28	LVS; 2	ATL; 8	DAR; 8	TEX; 16	BRI; 9	MAR; 27	TAL; 32	CAL; 6	RCH; 9	CLT; 8	DOV; 22	MCH; 4	POC; 29	SON; 35	DAY; 7	NHA; 15	POC; 40	IND; 6	GLN; 43	**MCH**; 43	BRI; 9	DAR; 2	RCH; 34	NHA; 8	DOV; 11	MAR; 13	CLT; 5	TAL; 4	CAR; 2	PHO; 13	HOM; 14	ATL; 11			9th	4062	
2000	Bill Davis Racing	22	Pontiac	DAY; 8	CAR; 3	LVS; 23	ATL; 8	DAR; 1*	BRI; 3	TEX; 14	MAR; 11	TAL; 10	CAL; 6	RCH; 6	CLT; 13	DOV; 8	MCH; 6	POC; 27	SON; 21	DAY; 7	NHA; 18	POC; 28	IND; 28	GLN; 22	MCH; 9	BRI; 11	DAR; 6	RCH; 8	NHA; 30	DOV; 40	MAR; 43	CLT; 10	TAL; 22	CAR; 8	PHO; 12	HOM; 39	ATL; 3			10th	4152	
2001	Bill Davis Racing	22	Dodge	DAY; 35*	CAR; 16	LVS; 21	ATL; 11	DAR; 12	BRI; 5	TEX; 21	MAR; 22	TAL; 33	CAL; 42	RCH; 21	CLT; 9	DOV; 14	MCH; 38	POC; 40	SON; 6	DAY; 4	CHI; 20	NHA; 20	POC; 38	IND; 6	GLN; 41	MCH; 33	BRI; 12	DAR; 1	RCH; 12	DOV; 33	KAN; 41	CLT; 3	MAR; 3	TAL; 21	PHO; 13	CAR; 6	HOM; 13	ATL; 5	NHA; 42	14th	3846	
2002	Bill Davis Racing	22	Dodge	DAY; 1	CAR; 13	LVS; 21	ATL; 7	DAR; 31	BRI; 25	TEX; 43	MAR; 14	TAL; 15	CAL; 18	**RCH**; 30*	CLT; 42	DOV; 37	POC; 33	MCH; 42	SON; 40	DAY; 9	CHI; 41	NHA; 1	POC; 14	IND; 30	GLN; 20	MCH; 29	BRI; 37	DAR; 6	RCH; 8	NHA; 38	DOV; 43	KAN; 43	TAL; 10	CLT; 33	MAR; 5*	ATL; 16	CAR; 40	PHO; 19	HOM; 12	25th	3362	
2003	Bill Davis Racing	22	Dodge	DAY; 38	CAR; 18	LVS; 25	ATL; 18	DAR; 29	BRI; 33	TEX; 12	TAL; 7	MAR; 25	CAL; 21	RCH; 11	CLT; 10	DOV; 37	POC; 8	MCH; 30	SON; 16	DAY; 30	CHI; 19	NHA; 25	POC; 19	IND; 26	GLN; 6	MCH; 14	BRI; 13	DAR; 19	RCH; 15	NHA; 39	DOV; 29	TAL; 14	KAN; 21	CLT; 28	MAR; 18					21st	3550	
2003	Haas CNC Racing	0	Pontiac																																	ATL; 13	PHO; 41	CAR; 18	HOM; 32	21st	3550	
2004	Haas CNC Racing	0	Chevy	DAY; 17	CAR; 9	LVS; 26	ATL; 13	DAR; 18	BRI; 28	TEX; 32	MAR; 22	TAL; 40	CAL; 10	RCH; 20	CLT; 16	DOV; 19	POC; 17	MCH; 30	SON; 24	DAY; 40	CHI; 19	NHA; 29	POC; 31	IND; 39	GLN; 37	MCH; 30	BRI; 18	CAL; 31	RCH; 40	NHA; 25	DOV; 37	TAL; 10	KAN; 30	CLT; 19	MAR; 28	ATL; 30	PHO; 40	DAR	HOM	32nd	2929	
2006	Morgan-McClure Motorsports	4	Chevy	DAY	CAL	LVS	ATL	BRI	MAR	TEX	PHO	TAL	RCH	DAR	CLT	DOV	POC	MCH	SON	DAY	CHI	NHA	POC	IND	GLN	MCH	BRI	CAL	RCH	NHA	DOV	KAN	TAL	CLT	MAR; 26	ATL	TEX; 25	PHO; 28	HOM; DNQ	53rd	252	
2007	Morgan-McClure Motorsports	4	Chevy	DAY; DNQ	CAL; DNQ	LVS; 43	ATL; DNQ	BRI; 18	MAR; DNQ	TEX; DNQ	PHO; 36	TAL; 36	RCH; 35	DAR; DNQ	CLT; DNQ	DOV; 41	POC; 33	MCH; DNQ	SON; DNQ	NHA; 43	DAY; DNQ	CHI; 41	IND; 14	POC; 43	GLN; DNQ	MCH; 20	BRI; 33	CAL; DNQ	RCH; DNQ	NHA; 41	DOV; DNQ	KAN; DNQ	TAL; DNQ	CLT; 43	MAR; 38	ATL; DNQ	TEX; DNQ	PHO; DNQ	HOM	47th	939	

===== Daytona 500 =====
Year	Team	Manufacturer	Start	Finish
1994	A.G. Dillard Motorsports	Chevrolet	DNQ	
1995	A.G. Dillard Motorsports	Chevrolet	21	15
1996	Bill Davis Racing	Pontiac	13	26
1997	Bill Davis Racing	Pontiac	17	8
1998	Bill Davis Racing	Pontiac	9	25
1999	Bill Davis Racing	Pontiac	18	24
2000	Bill Davis Racing	Pontiac	6	8
2001	Bill Davis Racing	Dodge	10	35
2002	Bill Davis Racing	Dodge	19	**1**
2003	Bill Davis Racing	Dodge	17	38
2004	Haas CNC Racing	Chevrolet	19	17
2007	Morgan-McClure Motorsports	Chevrolet	DNQ	

==== Busch Series ====
NASCAR Busch Series results
Year	Team	No.	Make	1	2	3	4	5	6	7	8	9	10	11	12	13	14	15	16	17	18	19	20	21	22	23	24	25	26	27	28	29	30	31	32	33	34	35	NBGNC	Pts	Ref
1990	Sam Ard Racing	5	Buick	DAY	RCH; 15	CAR; 27	MAR; 17	HCY	DAR; 30	BRI; 18			NZH; 30						MYB; 31	OXF	NHA					BRI; 30		RCH; 24						MAR; 21					21st	2271	
1990	Falcon Racing	9	Chevy								LAN; 13	SBO; 26		HCY; 12	CLT	DOV	ROU; 13	VOL; 25				SBO; 6	DUB; 7	IRP	ROU; 16						CLT; 7	NHA; 27	CAR; 22						21st	2271	
1990	Sam Ard Racing	5	Chevy																								DAR; 40												21st	2271	
1990		65	Pontiac																										DOV; 40	MAR									21st	2271	
1991	Henderson Motorsports	75	Olds	DAY; DNQ	RCH; 34	CAR; 26	MAR; 9	VOL; 24	HCY		BRI; 29			NZH; 12		DOV; 4	ROU; 13																						18th	3145	
1991	Henderson Motorsports	75	Chevy							DAR; 33					CLT; 9																								18th	3145	
1991	Henderson Motorsports	75	Buick									LAN; 10	SBO; 29																										18th	3145	
1991	A.G. Dillard Motorsports	27	Buick															HCY; 15	MYB; 8	GLN; 22	OXF; 14	NHA; 34	SBO; 18	DUB; 26	**IRP**; 26	ROU; 17	BRI; 15	DAR; 36	RCH; 9	DOV; 3	**CLT**; 12*	NHA; 22	CAR; 24	MAR; 6					18th	3145	
1992	A.G. Dillard Motorsports	27	Chevy	DAY; 3																		TAL; 30			MCH; 28														8th	3648	
1992	A.G. Dillard Motorsports	27	Buick		CAR; 1	RCH; 27	ATL; 37	MAR; 19	DAR; 7	BRI; 18	HCY; 7	LAN; 21	DUB; 9	NZH; 17	CLT; 6	DOV; 6	ROU; 12	MYB; 7	GLN; 15	VOL; 19	NHA; 22		IRP; 13	ROU; 8		NHA; 39	BRI; 5	DAR; 11	RCH; 11	DOV; 21	CLT; 16	MAR; 16	CAR; 18	HCY; 21					8th	3648	
1993	A.G. Dillard Motorsports	2	Chevy	DAY; 21									CLT; 11			GLN; 3		TAL; 22	IRP; 4	MCH; 24	NHA; 25		DAR; 23		DOV; 30	ROU; 25	CLT; 7		**CAR**; 2		ATL; 1*								6th	3413	
1993	A.G. Dillard Motorsports	2	Buick		CAR; 24	RCH; 32	DAR; 4	**BRI**; 17	HCY; 16	ROU; 1*	MAR; 1*	NZH; 3*		**DOV**; 35	**MYB**; 2		MLW; 19					BRI; 24		RCH; 22				MAR; 17		HCY; 12									6th	3413	
1995	American Equipment Racing	95	Chevy	DAY	CAR	RCH	ATL	NSV	DAR	BRI	HCY	NHA; 13	NZH	CLT; 11	DOV; 31	MYB	GLN	MLW	TAL; 36	SBO; 5	IRP; 8	MCH; 8	BRI	DAR; 3	RCH	DOV; 12	CLT; 38	CAR; 4	HOM; 31										31st	1389	
1996	Fred Turner Racing	22	Pontiac	DAY; DNQ	CAR	RCH	ATL; 8	NSV	DAR; 10	BRI	HCY	NZH	CLT; 10	DOV	SBO	MYB	GLN	MLW	NHA	TAL	IRP	MCH; 12	BRI	DAR; 19	RCH; 16	DOV; 14	CLT; 41	CAR; DNQ	HOM										47th	919	
1998	Michael Waltrip Racing	14	Ford	DAY	CAR	LVS	NSV	DAR	BRI	TEX	HCY	TAL	NHA	NZH	CLT	DOV	RCH	PPR	GLN	MLW	MYB	CAL	SBO	IRP	MCH	BRI	DAR	RCH; DNQ	DOV	CLT	GTY	CAR	ATL	HOM					NA	–	
1999	Bill Davis Racing	02	Pontiac	DAY	CAR	LVS	ATL	DAR	TEX	NSV	BRI	TAL	CAL; DNQ	NHA	RCH	NZH	CLT	DOV; 2	SBO	GLN	MLW	MYB	PPR	GTY	IRP	MCH; 4	BRI	**DAR**; 4			CLT; 6	CAR	MEM	PHO	HOM; 10				53rd	851	
1999	Innovative Motorsports	47	Chevy																										RCH; 32	DOV									53rd	851	
2000	Bill Davis Racing	22	Pontiac	DAY	CAR; DNQ	LVS	ATL	DAR	BRI	TEX	NSV	TAL	CAL; 34	RCH	NHA	CLT; 34	DOV	SBO	MYB	GLN	MLW	NZH	PPR	GTY	IRP	MCH; 4	BRI				CLT; 12	CAR; 5	MEM	PHO	HOM				54th	724	
2000	Innovative Motorsports	48	Chevy																									DAR; 5	RCH	DOV									54th	724	
2001	Tommy Baldwin Racing	5	Chevy	DAY	CAR	LVS	ATL	DAR	BRI	TEX	NSH	TAL	CAL	RCH	NHA	NZH	CLT	DOV	KEN	MLW	GLN	CHI	GTY	PPR	IRP	MCH	BRI	DAR	RCH	DOV	KAN	CLT; 8	MEM	PHO	CAR	HOM; 7			70th	288	
2007	Brewco Motorsports	27	Ford	DAY; 32	CAL; 34	MXC	LVS; 15	ATL; 21	BRI; 27	NSH	TEX; 21	PHO; 20	TAL; 8	RCH; 25	DAR; 21	CLT; 19	DOV; 17	NSH	KEN	MLW	NHA; 16	DAY; 19	CHI; 22	GTY	IRP	CGV	GLN	MCH; 35	BRI	CAL	RCH	DOV	KAN	CLT	MEM	TEX	PHO	HOM	40th	1555	

==== Camping World Truck Series ====
NASCAR Camping World Truck Series results
Year	Team	No.	Make	1	2	3	4	5	6	7	8	9	10	11	12	13	14	15	16	17	18	19	20	21	22	NCWTC	Pts	Ref
2012	Hillman Racing	27	Chevy	DAY; 8	MAR	CAR	KAN	CLT	DOV	TEX	KEN	IOW	CHI	POC	MCH	BRI	ATL	IOW	KEN	LVS	TAL	MAR	TEX	PHO	HOM	59th	36	

Achievements
Preceded by Michael Waltrip	Daytona 500 Winner; 2002	Succeeded by Michael Waltrip
Preceded by Bobby Labonte	Southern 500 Winner; 2001	Succeeded by Jeff Gordon
