= 2003 Ford 300 =

Race details
- Map of Speedway
- Date: November 15, 2003
- Official name: 2003 Ford 300
- Location: Homestead–Miami Speedway in Homestead, Florida
- Course: Oval
- Course length: 1.5 miles (2.4 km)
- Distance: 200 laps, 300 mi (482.803 km)
- Average speed: 121.376 mph (195.336 km/h)

Pole position
Driver	Greg Biffle	Evans Motorsports
- Time: 30.437

Most laps led
Driver	Jamie McMurray	Phoenix Racing
- Laps: 77

Winner
No. 38	Kasey Kahne	Akins Motorsports

Television in the United States
- Network: NBC
- Announcers: Allen Bestwick, Kurt Busch, Benny Parsons

The 2003 Ford 300 was the 34th and final race of the 2003 NASCAR Busch Series and the 9th iteration of this event. The race was held at Homestead–Miami Speedway in Homestead, Florida. The race had six drivers contend for the Busch Series championship. Greg Biffle won the pole while Jamie McMurray led the most laps but it was Kasey Kahne taking home his first ever win of his whole NASCAR career. In the championship battle, Brian Vickers won the championship, his first and only in the Busch Series at the age of 20 years old becoming the youngest driver to ever win the Busch Series Championship until Chase Elliott broke the record in 2014 at the age of 18.

== Background ==
Homestead–Miami Speedway is a motor racing track located in Homestead, Florida. The track, which has several configurations, has promoted several series of racing, including NASCAR, the IndyCar Series, the WeatherTech SportsCar Championship series, and the Championship Cup Series.

From 2002 to 2019, Homestead–Miami Speedway hosted the final race of the season in all three of NASCAR's series as Ford Championship Weekend: the NASCAR Cup Series, NASCAR Xfinity Series, and the NASCAR Camping World Truck Series. The races currently have the names Dixie Vodka 400, Contender Boats 250, and Baptist Health 200, respectively.

=== Championship battle ===
The race had six drivers contend for the 2003 NASCAR Busch Series championship with those six being Ron Hornaday Jr., Brian Vickers, Scott Riggs, Bobby Hamilton Jr., David Green, and Jason Keller. All were looking for their first Busch Series title except for Green who was the 1994 Busch Series champion. The points lead had also changed a total of 17 times over the 33 races including the points lead changing 7 times over the last 8 races.

Brian Vickers was the points leader coming into the race looking to become the youngest Busch Series champion in its history at 20 years old. Vickers had spent the last two seasons driving for his father Clyde Vickers before he got the call to drive the No. 5 car that was previously driven and currently owned by Rick Hendrick's son Ricky Hendrick. Both Vickers and Ricky would become close to one another during the season. David Green was 22 points behind in 2nd and was looking to become the 6th driver in Busch Series history to win multiple championships alongside drivers Jack Ingram, Sam Ard, Larry Pearson, Randy LaJoie, and Dale Earnhardt Jr. Ron Hornaday was 39 points back in 3rd and was looking for his first Busch Series title after he had won two Craftsman Truck Series titles in 1996 and 1998. Jason Keller was 70 points back in 4th and was looking for his first Busch Series title after he finished in the top 5 in points over the last 3 seasons with points finishes of 2nd in 2000, 3rd in 2001, and 2nd in 2002. Scott Riggs was 85 points back in 5th and coming into the last race at Rockingham, he was the points leader. But Riggs hit the wall during the race and ended up not finishing the race which took him from first all the way back to 5th in the standings. During the season, the championship battle looked like it was gonna have 5 drivers contend until Bobby Hamilton Jr. came in, who was 369 points out of the lead after the 24th race at Bristol, and had built up enough consistency including two wins in the final 10 races at Memphis and Phoenix to be able to contend for the championship. Hamilton Jr. was 89 points back in 6th and was looking to shock everyone and win the championship.

=== Championship standings entering the race ===
1. **Brian Vickers**, 4507 points
2. **David Green**, –22
3. **Ron Hornaday Jr.**, –39
4. **Jason Keller**, –70
5. **Scott Riggs**, –85
6. **Bobby Hamilton Jr.**, –89
7. Scott Wimmer, –494
8. Johnny Sauter, –536
9. Kasey Kahne, –583
10. Stacy Compton, –714

Bold indicates drivers mathematically eligible for the 2003 NASCAR Busch Series championship

=== Entry list ===
- **(R)** denotes rookie driver
- **(CC#)** denotes championship contender and where they rank in the standings

No.	Driver	Team/Owner	Manufacturer
00	Jason Leffler	Haas CNC Racing	Chevrolet
0	Gus Wasson	Davis Motorsports	Chevrolet
1	Jamie McMurray	Phoenix Racing	Dodge
02	Hermie Sadler	SCORE Motorsports	Ford
2	Ron Hornaday Jr. **(CC3)**	Richard Childress Racing	Chevrolet
4	Mike Wallace	Biagi Brothers Racing	Chevrolet
5	Brian Vickers **(CC1)**	Hendrick Motorsports	Chevrolet
7	Greg Biffle	Evans Motorsports	Chevrolet
8	Martin Truex Jr.	Chance 2 Motorsports	Chevrolet
9	Morgan Shepherd	Victory in Jesus Racing	Ford
10	Scott Riggs **(CC5)**	ppc Racing	Ford
12	Tim Fedewa	FitzBradshaw Racing	Chevrolet
14	Casey Atwood	FitzBradshaw Racing	Chevrolet
15	Jon Wood	ppc Racing	Ford
16	Larry Gunselman	Day Enterprises Racing	Chevrolet
17	Matt Kenseth	Reiser Enterprises	Ford
18	Coy Gibbs **(R)**	Joe Gibbs Racing	Chevrolet
19	Casey Mears	Braun Racing	Dodge
20	Mike Bliss	Joe Gibbs Racing	Chevrolet
21	Kevin Harvick	Richard Childress Racing	Chevrolet
23	Scott Wimmer	Bill Davis Racing	Chevrolet
25	Bobby Hamilton Jr. **(CC6)**	Team Rensi Motorsports	Ford
26	Chad Blount **(R)**	Carroll Racing	Dodge
27	Chase Montgomery **(R)**	Brewco Motorsports	Pontiac
28	Brad Baker	Gary Baker Racing	Dodge
29	Johnny Sauter	Richard Childress Racing	Chevrolet
30	David Stremme **(R)**	Braun Racing	Dodge
31	Dave Blaney	Marsh Racing	Ford
33	Damon Lusk **(R)**	BACE Motorsports	Chevrolet
35	Elliott Sadler	Team Rensi Motorsports	Ford
36	Steve Grissom	DCT Motorsports	Chevrolet
37	David Green **(CC2)**	Brewco Motorsports	Pontiac
38	Kasey Kahne	Akins Motorsports	Ford
39	Clint Vahsholtz	Jay Robinson Racing	Ford
44	Mike Harmon	GIC-Mixon Motorsports	Chevrolet
46	Ashton Lewis Jr.	Lewis Motorsports	Chevrolet
48	Carlos Contreras	Innovative Motorsports	Chevrolet
49	Tammy Jo Kirk	Jay Robinson Racing	Ford
51	Stan Boyd	Ware Racing Enterprises	Chevrolet
56	Regan Smith **(R)**	Mac Hill Motorsports	Chevrolet
57	Jason Keller **(CC4)**	ppc Racing	Ford
59	Stacy Compton	ST Motorsports	Chevrolet
61	Justin Ashburn	Day Enterprises Racing	Chevrolet
73	Jason Schuler	Havill-Spoerl Racing	Ford
77	Derek Hayes	Moy Racing	Ford
79	Joe Aramendia	Aramendia Motorsports	Chevrolet
80	Mark Green	Montgomery Motorsports	Pontiac
82	Randy LaJoie	FitzBradshaw Racing	Chevrolet
87	Joe Nemechek	NEMCO Motorsports	Chevrolet
89	Wally Dallenbach Jr.	Reiser Enterprises	Ford
92	Jeff Green	Herzog-Jackson Motorsports	Chevrolet
99	Michael Waltrip	Michael Waltrip Racing	Chevrolet
Official Entry List

== Qualifying ==
Greg Biffle won the pole for the last race of the year with a time of 30.437 and a speed of 177.416 mph.

=== Starting Grid ===
Grid	No.	Driver	Team	Manufacturer
1	7	Greg Biffle	Evans Motorsports	Chevrolet
2	25	Bobby Hamilton Jr.	Team Rensi Motorsports	Ford
3	38	Kasey Kahne	Akins Motorsports	Ford
4	21	Kevin Harvick	Richard Childress Racing	Ford
5	1	Jamie McMurray	Phoenix Racing	Dodge
6	5	Brian Vickers	Hendrick Motorsports	Chevrolet
7	30	David Stremme (R)	Braun Racing	Dodge
8	87	Joe Nemechek	NEMCO Motorsports	Chevrolet
9	8	Martin Truex Jr.*	Chance 2 Motorsports	Chevrolet
10	31	Dave Blaney	Marsh Racing	Ford
11	59	Stacy Compton	ST Motorsports	Chevrolet
12	37	David Green	Brewco Motorsports	Pontiac
13	02	Hermie Sadler	SCORE Motorsports	Ford
14	00	Jason Leffler	Haas CNC Racing	Chevrolet
15	35	Elliott Sadler	Team Rensi Motorsports	Ford
16	33	Damon Lusk (R)	BACE Motorsports	Chevrolet
17	2	Ron Hornady*	Richard Childress Racing	Chevrolet
18	4	Mike Wallace	Biagi Brothers Racing	Chevrolet
19	56	Regan Smith (R)	Mac Hill Motorsports	Chevrolet
20	10	Scott Riggs	ppc Racing	Ford
21	29	Johnny Sauter	Richard Childress Racing	Chevrolet
22	46	Ashton Lewis	Lewis Motorsports	Chevrolet
23	15	Jon Wood	ppc Racing	Ford
24	99	Michael Waltrip	Michael Waltrip Racing	Chevrolet
25	17	Matt Kenseth	Reiser Enterprises	Ford
26	92	Jeff Green	Herzog-Jackson Motorsports	Chevrolet
27	19	Casey Mears	Braun Racing	Dode
28	20	Mike Bliss	Joe Gibbs Racing	Chevrolet
29	0	Gus Wasson	Davis Motorsports	Chevrolet
30	57	Jason Keller	ppc Racing	Ford
31	80	Mark Green	Montgomery Motorsports	Pontiac
32	89	Wally Dallenbach Jr.	Reiser Enterprises	Ford
33	48	Carlos Contreras	Innovative Motorsports	Chevrolet
34	14	Casey Atwood	FitzBradshaw Racing	Chevrolet
35	26	Chad Blount (R)	Carroll Racing	Dodge
36	12	Tim Fedewa	FitzBradshaw Racing	Chevrolet
37	23	Scott Wimmer	Bill Davis Racing	Dodge
38	18	Coy Gibbs (R)	Joe Gibbs Racing	Chevrolet
39	27	Chase Montgomery (R)	Brewco Motorsports	Pontiac
40	77	Derek Hayes	Moy Racing	Ford
41	49	Tammy Jo Kirk	Jay Robinson Racing	Ford
42	16	Larry Gunselman	Day Enterprises Racing	Chevrolet
43	36	Steve Grissom	DCT Motorsports	Chevrolet
Failed to Qualify, driver changes, or withdrew
44	9	Morgan Shepherd	Victory in Jesus Racing	Ford
45	73	Jason Schuler	Havill-Spoerl Racing	Ford
46	39	Clint Vahsholtz	Jay Robinson Racing	Ford
47	61	Justin Ashburn	Day Enterprises Racing	Chevrolet
48	44	Mike Harmon	GIC-Mixon Motorsports	Chevrolet
49	51	Stan Boyd	Ware Racing Enterprises	Chevrolet
50	79	Joe Aramendia	Aramendia Motorsports	Chevrolet
51	28	Brad Baker	Gary Baker Racing	Dodge
WD	82	Randy LaJoie	FitzBradshaw Racing	Chevrolet
Official Starting Grid

* - Ron Hornaday and Martin Truex Jr. both had to start at the rear of the field with Hornaday having a backup car and Truex having an engine change.

== Race ==
At the start, Greg Biffle got off to a great start and took the lead from Bobby Hamilton Jr. by at least 3 car lengths. But the first caution flew on the same lap that ended one of the championship contenders' hopes. In turn 3, Scott Riggs got bumped from behind by Jon Wood, who was making his 2nd Busch Series start, which sent Riggs spinning and Ashton Lewis hit Wood from behind sending Wood spinning. Riggs hit the outside wall rear side first before the car came back down across the track where he was hit again by both FitzBradshaw Racing cars in Casey Atwood and Tim Fedewa. Riggs' car suffered a lot of damage which ended his hopes of winning the Busch Series title and took him in a complete nosedive from first in the standings all the way down to 6th in the standings in just two races. Biffle led the first lap of the race coming back to the caution flag. The race restarted on lap 9. On that same lap, another problem occurred for another of the championship contenders with that being David Green. Green's right rear tire went flat which slowed him down causing him to lose positions after he restarted in 9th and almost caused him to spin in turns 3 and 4 where he saved it and was able to nurse it to pit road the next lap. But things got worse for Green as he was black flagged for not using the turns 3 & 4 access road to get to pit road and had to do a pass through which would put green 2 laps down in 40th. Meanwhile, Bobby Hamilton Jr. battled Greg Biffle for the lead. Hamilton Jr. battled with Biffle for the lead for multiple laps until lap 31 when Hamilton Jr. finally took the lead from Biffle. On lap 34, the second caution came out for debris. Hamilton Jr. won the race off of pit road and led the field back to green on lap 40. By around lap 70, Bobby Hamilton Jr. had a challenger for the lead in Jamie McMurray. On lap 72, McMurray took the lead. Hamilton Jr. was also only 25 points behind Brian Vickers for the Championship in second place in the standings. At around lap 90, Scott Riggs got back on the track attempting to finish the race. But after about 2 laps, Riggs decided to retire from the race. Around lap 95, green flag pitstops began. During that time, Brian Vickers came in and had damage to the left front of his car from contact with another car and wanted to tape it up but didn't. On lap 104, Jamie McMurray came down pit road giving the lead to Ashton Lewis. Lewis decided to come to pit road but went too fast through the access road in turns 3 and 4 and ended up turning up to the grass and spinning out near pit road entrance on the apron off of turn 4. While Lewis spun, something flew out of his car which got Derek Hayes rear ended by Matt Kenseth turning Hayes around on lap 105 and bringing out the 3rd caution of the race. The caution would be a very bad break for Brian Vickers since he came down pit road and never got his car taped up and another championship contender in Ron Hornaday was the leader as the caution came out. But for Hornaday, he was planning to pit around that time but couldn't because pit road was closed for the caution and he believed his car ran out of fuel. But he was able to hold his position until he came to pit road. When the caution flew, Hornaday was the new leader in points just 38 points above Brian Vickers. But that eventually switched as Vickers took it back 25 above Hornaday after Hornaday pitted. Vickers would be one lap down in 20th as the race restarted on lap 118 with Jamie McMurray as the new leader. The points began to get closer as Hornaday was only 13 behind Vickers and David Green moved to third in the standings 25 behind Vickers as Hamilton Jr. moved to 4th only 41 back by lap 123.

=== Final laps ===
On lap 124, Kasey Kahne challenged Jamie McMurray for the lead. But Kahne could not pass McMurray for the lead. On lap 141, Greg Biffle's right front tire exploded which put debris on the track bringing out the 4th caution of the race. Vickers was the first car one lap down at the time which meant he got his lap back. Vickers would eventually get the left front taped up under the caution. The race restarted on lap 148 with Matt Kenseth as the new leader. David Green was in 22nd place the second car one lap down and on the restart, Green got past Dave Blaney who was in front of him and he then passed the next lapped car that started in front of Green and Blaney in David's brother Jeff Green and wanted to stay in front of them to get the free pass if a caution came out. Lucky for Green, as soon as he passed those cars to be the first car one lap down, the 5th caution came out when rookie David Stremme lost control of his car in turn 1 and spun which meant Green got his lap back. The race restarted with 47 laps to go. With 44 to go, Jamie McMurray took the lead from Kenseth. With 35 laps to go, Jamie McMurray's chances of winning vanished when a tire went flat on his car and had to pit giving the lead back to Kenseth. Kenseth already had his mirror full with Kasey Kahne all over his rear bumper. With 31 to go, David Green had moved up to 2nd in the standings over Hornaday and was only 13 behind Brian Vickers. Unfortunetly for Kenseth, his chances of winning also vanished with 28 laps to go when his car all of a sudden lost power handing the lead to Kasey Kahne, who was looking for his first ever win in NASCAR. On the next lap, the 6th and final caution flew when Scott Wimmer's engine blew. The race restarted with 21 laps to go with Kasey Kahne as the leader. Behind Kahne was another young driver in Martin Truex Jr. who was also looking for his first win in NASCAR making his 15th Busch Series start and his 6th start for his owner Dale Earnhardt Jr. But Truex could not catch Kahne for the lead. Meanwhile, the points battle began to get tight in the closing laps of the race. It eventually was going to come down to between Brian Vickers and David Green. Green had cut the points margin to 14 with around 15 to go. Kasey Kahne stayed out in front and Kahne would win the race scoring his first ever NASCAR win in his 54th Busch Series start. Martin Truex Jr., Bobby Hamilton Jr., Jason Leffler, and Ashton Lewis rounded out the top 5 while Kevin Harvick, Mike Bliss, Casey Mears, David Green, and Michael Waltrip rounded out the top 10. David Green finished 9th but it was unfortunately not enough as Brian Vickers would win the NASCAR Busch Series Championship. Vickers beat Green by 14 points, Ron Hornaday by 46 points, Bobby Hamilton Jr. by 49 points, Jason Keller by 109, and Scott Riggs by 175. Vickers was the youngest Busch Series champion at 20 years old and would hold that record until an 18 year old Chase Elliott broke that record in 2014.

=== Aftermath ===
After this season, many drivers haven't come close the level they had in 2003. Kasey Kahne, Brian Vickers, and Scott Riggs all moved up to the Cup Series in 2004 with Kahne driving for Evernham Motorsports, Vickers moving up with Hendrick, and Riggs driving for MBV Motorsports. Kahne had a solid career in the Cup Series driving for five different owners Ray Evernham, Richard Petty, Dietrich Mateschitz, Rick Hendrick, and Bob Leavine scoring 18 career Cup wins with Evernham, Petty, Mateschitz, and Hendrick before retiring in 2018. Vickers would move up to Hendrick driving the No. 25 car with Ricky being the owner of the car all while Ricky was the owner of the No. 5 Busch Series car for a 19 year old driver named Kyle Busch. Vickers would become a journey man driver in the Cup Series after spending just three seasons at Hendrick Motorsports while also dealing with the tragic loss of Ricky in the 2004 Hendrick Motorsports aircraft crash in October at Stuart, Virginia near Martinsville. Vickers scored that first win for Hendrick in his 107th start at Talladega in the Fall of 2006 in very controversial fashion after he took out both his teammate Jimmie Johnson and Dale Earnhardt Jr. on the final lap. Vickers dedicated the win to Ricky. Vickers would score 3 wins in the Cup Series for three different owners in Hendrick, Mateschitz, and Michael Waltrip before retiring in 2016. Scott Riggs never scored a win in the Cup Series as he drove for MBV and Ray Evernham from 2004 to 2007 before becoming a journey man driver and retiring in 2013. Bobby Hamilton Jr. drove in the first 23 races of the 2004 Busch Series season before going up to the Cup Series driving the No. 32 car for PPI Motorsports from 2004 to 2005 not scoring a single top 10. Ron Hornaday went full time in 2004 again for Richard Childress finishing 4th in points before he decided to go back to full time racing in the Truck Series for Kevin Harvick's team Kevin Harvick Inc. from 2005–2011 winning two more championships in 2007 and 2009 and ran two more full time seasons from 2012–2013 with NTS Motorsports before retiring in 2014 with the most Truck Series championship titles in its history with 4. Jason Keller and David Green stayed in the Busch Series with Keller retiring in 2010 and Green retiring in 2013. Martin Truex Jr. became arguably the most successful out of all of them. Truex would go full-time in the Busch Series from 2004 to 2005 driving for Chance 2 Motorsports in the No. 8 car, except for the 2004 season opening race at Daytona where Truex drove the No. 81 since Earnhardt Jr. was driving the No. 8 for that race, scoring a combined 12 wins in those two years and winning the Busch Series championship in both seasons. Truex would move up to the Cup Series full-time in 2006 driving the No. 1 for Dale Earnhardt Inc. and has scored 34 career wins with four different owners with those being Teresa Earnhardt, Michael Waltrip, Barney Visser, and Joe Gibbs including a Cup Series title in 2017 with Visser. Truex would retire after the 2024 season. The Busch Series never saw a championship battle this close until 2013, then named the Nationwide Series, in a tense championship battle between Austin Dillon and Sam Hornish Jr. with Dillon beating Hornish by 3 points.

== Race results ==
Pos	Car	Driver	Team	Manufacturer	Laps Run	Laps Led	Status	Points
1	38	Kasey Kahne	Akins Motorsports	Ford	200	29	running	180
2	8	Martin Truex Jr.	Chance 2 Motorsports	Chevrolet	200	0	running	170
3	25	Bobby Hamilton Jr.	Team Rensi Motorsports	Ford	200	41	running	170
4	00	Jason Leffler	Haas CNC Racing	Chevrolet	200	0	running	160
5	46	Ashton Lewis	Lewis Motorsports	Ford	200	0	running	155
6	21	Kevin Harvick	Richard Childress Racing	Chevrolet	200	0	running	150
7	20	Mike Bliss	Joe Gibbs Racing	Chevrolet	200	0	running	146
8	19	Casey Mears	Braun Racing	Dodge	200	0	running	142
9	37	David Green	Brewco Motorsports	Pontiac	200	0	running	138
10	99	Michael Waltrip	Michael Waltrip Racing	Chevrolet	200	0	running	134
11	5	Brian Vickers	Hendrick Motorsports	Chevrolet	200	0	running	130
12	29	Johnny Sauter	Richard Childress Racing	Chevrolet	200	0	running	127
13	7	Greg Biffle	Evans Motorsports	Chevrolet	200	30	running	129
14	30	David Stremme (R)	Braun Racing	Dodge	200	0	running	121
15	2	Ron Hornaday	Richard Childress Racing	Chevrolet	200	2	running	123
16	15	Dave Blaney	Marsh Racing	Ford	200	0	running	115
17	48	Carlos Contreras	Innovative Motorsports	Chevrolet	200	0	running	112
18	33	Damon Lusk (R)	BACE Motorsports	Chevrolet	200	0	running	109
19	87	Joe Nemechek	NEMCO Motorsports	Chevrolet	200	0	running	106
20	1	Jamie McMurray	Phoenix Racing	Chevrolet	199	77	running	113
21	59	Stacy Compton	ST Motorsports	Chevrolet	199	77	running	100
22	15	Jon Wood	ppc Racing	Ford	199	0	running	97
23	4	Mike Wallace	Biagi Brothers Racing	Chevrolet	199	0	running	94
24	57	Jason Keller	ppc Racing	Ford	199	0	running	91
25	89	Wally Dallenbach Jr.	Reiser Enterprises	Ford	199	0	running	88
26	80	Mark Green	Montgomery Motorsports	Pontiac	199	0	running	85
27	92	Jeff Green	Herzog-Jackson Motorsports	Chevrolet	198	0	running	82
28	56	Regan Smith (R)	Mac Hill Motorsports	Chevrolet	198	0	running	79
29	02	Hermie Sadler	SCORE Motorsports	Ford	197	0	running	76
30	36	Steve Grissom	DCT Motorsports	Chevrolet	195	0	engine	73
31	18	Coy Gibbs (R)	Joe Gibbs Racing	Chevrolet	195	0	running	70
32	49	Tammy Jo Kirk	Jay Robinson Racing	Ford	194	0	running	67
33	27	Chase Montgomery (R)	Brewco Motorsports	Pontiac	194	0	running	64
34	0	Gus Wasson	Davis Motorsports	Chevrolet	192	0	running	61
35	77	Derek Hayes	Moy Racing	Ford	191	0	running	58
36	35	Elliott Sadler	Team Rensi Motorsports	Ford	183	0	engine	55
37	26	Chad Blount (R)	Carroll Racing	Dodge	172	0	transmission	52
38	17	Matt Kenseth	Reiser Enterprises	Ford	171	21	electrical	54
39	23	Scott Wimmer	Bill Davis Racing	Chevrolet	171	0	engine	46
40	16	Larry Gunselman	Day Enterprises Racing	Chevrolet	148	0	handling	43
41	10	Scott Riggs	ppc Racing	Ford	28	0	crash	40
42	12	Tim Fedewa	FitzBradshaw Racing	Chevrolet	18	0	crash	37
43	14	Casey Atwood	FitzBradshaw Racing	Chevrolet	0	0	crash	34
Official Race results

== Standings ==
Place	Driver	Points/Behind
1	**Brian Vickers**	**4637**
2	Davis Green	–14
3	Ron Hornaday	–46
4	Bobby Hamilton Jr.	–49
5	Jason Keller	–109
6	Scott Riggs	–175
7	Kasey Kahne	–533
8	Johnny Sauter	–539
9	Scott Wimmer	–578
10	Mike Bliss	–705

Bold indicates driver won the 2003 Busch Series Championship

Previous race: 2003 Target House 200	NASCAR Busch Series; 2003 season	Next race: 2004 Hershey's Kisses 300
