= Mike Olsen =

American racing driver (born 1968)

- Born: February 8, 1968 (age 58); North Haverhill, New Hampshire, U.S.
- Achievements: 2001 NASCAR Busch North Series Champion; 2006 NASCAR Busch East Series Champion

NASCAR Cup Series career
- 1 race run over 1 year
- 2012 position: 51st
- Best finish: 51st (2012)
- First race: 2012 Sylvania 300 (Loudon)
Wins	Top tens	Poles
0	0	0

NASCAR O'Reilly Auto Parts Series career
- 11 races run over 5 years
- Best finish: 72nd (1997)
- First race: 1996 Meridian Advantage 200 (Nazareth Speedway)
- Last race: 2000 Econo Lodge 200 (Nazareth Speedway)
Wins	Top tens	Poles
0	0	0

NASCAR FedEx Freight Truck Series career
- 3 races run over 2 years
- Best finish: 82nd (2001)
- First race: 2001 New England 200 (New Hampshire International Speedway)
- Last race: 2008 Camping World RV Rental 200 (New Hampshire Motor Speedway)
Wins	Top tens	Poles
0	0	0
- Statistics up to date as of September 23, 2012.

Mike Olsen (born February 8, 1968) is an American stock car racing driver. He is a two-time champion of the now ARCA Menards Series East. He has also competed in all three NASCAR national touring series.

== Personal life ==
Olsen was born February 8, 1968, and is a native of North Haverhill, New Hampshire. He is the grandson of famed New England racer Stub Fadden.

== Career ==
Olsen is a two-time champion of the NASCAR Busch North Series, winning the championship in 2001 and 2006. He began racing in the series in 1989, and competed in 288 events in the series between then and 2009, scoring six career wins. His sponsor for the majority of his time in the series was Little Trees air fresheners. After the season, he was flagged as the winner of the 2005 Toyota All-Star Showdown over David Gilliland, but in post-race inspection it was discovered that illegal right-side wheels were installed on his car. Olsen was disqualified as a result, with Gilliland being declared the winner.

Olsen competed in eleven NASCAR Busch Series events between 1996 and 2000, with the majority being combination races between the Busch and Busch North series; his best finish in Busch Series competition was eighteenth at Watkins Glen International in 1997. Olsen also made three starts in the NASCAR Craftsman Truck Series, with two coming in 2001 and one in 2008; his best finish in the series is 29th.

After several years off from NASCAR competition, Olsen returned to the track in 2012, competing in the NASCAR K&N Pro Series West at Portland International Raceway; he started 30th in the thirty-car field and finished 24th. In September of that year, Olsen made his debut in NASCAR's top series, the Sprint Cup Series, at New Hampshire Motor Speedway in the Sylvania 300, driving the No. 32 Ford for FAS Lane Racing; he finished 33rd in the event, which he stated was likely to be his one and only race in the series. This is the last time Olsen ran in a NASCAR-sanctioned event.

== Motorsports career results ==
=== NASCAR ===
(key) (Bold – Pole position awarded by qualifying time. Italics – Pole position earned by points standings or practice time. * – Most laps led.)

==== Sprint Cup Series ====
NASCAR Sprint Cup Series results
Year	Team	No.	Make	1	2	3	4	5	6	7	8	9	10	11	12	13	14	15	16	17	18	19	20	21	22	23	24	25	26	27	28	29	30	31	32	33	34	35	36	NSCC	Pts	Ref
2012	FAS Lane Racing	32	Ford	DAY	PHO	LVS	BRI	CAL	MAR	TEX	KAN	RCH	TAL	DAR	CLT	DOV	POC	MCH	SON	KEN	DAY	NHA	IND	POC	GLN	MCH	BRI	ATL	RCH	CHI	NHA; 33	DOV	TAL	CLT	KAN	MAR	TEX	PHO	HOM	51st	11	

==== Busch Series ====
NASCAR Busch Series results
Year	Team	No.	Make	1	2	3	4	5	6	7	8	9	10	11	12	13	14	15	16	17	18	19	20	21	22	23	24	25	26	27	28	29	30	31	32	NBGNC	Pts	Ref
1990	Olsen Racing	61	Buick	DAY	RCH	CAR	MAR	HCY	DAR	BRI	LAN	SBO	NZH	HCY	CLT	DOV	ROU	VOL	MYB	OXF; DNQ	NHA	SBO	DUB	IRP	ROU	BRI	DAR	RCH	DOV	MAR	CLT	NHA	CAR	MAR		N/A	0	
1996	Olsen Racing	61	Pontiac	DAY	CAR	RCH	ATL	NSV	DAR	BRI	HCY	NZH; 21	CLT	DOV	SBO	MYB	GLN	MLW	NHA	TAL	IRP	MCH	BRI	DAR	RCH	DOV	CLT	CAR	HOM							NC^{2}	0	
1997	Olsen Racing	61	Chevy	DAY	CAR; DNQ	RCH; 39	ATL	LVS	DAR	HCY; 31	TEX; DNQ	BRI	NSV	TAL	NHA; 29	NZH; 26	CLT	DOV	SBO	GLN	MLW	MYB	GTY	IRP	MCH	BRI	DAR		DOV	CLT	CAL	CAR; DNQ	HOM			72nd	268	
1997	Olsen Racing	16	Chevy																									RCH; 29								72nd	268	
1998	Olsen Racing	61	Chevy	DAY	CAR	LVS	NSV	DAR	BRI	TEX	HCY	TAL	NHA; DNQ	NZH; 25	CLT	DOV	RCH; DNQ	PPR	GLN	MLW	MYB	CAL	SBO	IRP	MCH	BRI	DAR	RCH	DOV	CLT	GTY	CAR	ATL	HOM		NC^{2}	0	
1999	Olsen Racing	61	Chevy	DAY	CAR	LVS	ATL	DAR	TEX	NSV	BRI	TAL	CAL	NHA	RCH	NZH; DNQ	CLT	DOV	SBO																	NC^{2}	0	
1999	Olsen Racing	81	Chevy																	GLN; 18	MLW	MYB	PPR	GTY	IRP	MCH	BRI	DAR	RCH	DOV	CLT	CAR	MEM	PHO	HOM	NC^{2}	0	
2000	Innovative Motorsports	30	Chevy	DAY	CAR	LVS	ATL	DAR	BRI	TEX	NSV	TAL	CAL	RCH	NHA; 26	CLT	DOV	SBO	MYB																	99th	85	
2000	Olsen Racing	61	Chevy																	GLN; 42	MLW	NZH; 27	PPR	GTY	IRP	MCH	BRI	DAR	RCH	DOV	CLT	CAR	MEM	PHO	HOM	99th	85	

Olsen had a best finish in the series of 18th and mostly ran for his self-owned team. He DNQ’d often.

==== Craftsman Truck Series ====
NASCAR Craftsman Truck Series results
Year	Team	No.	Make	1	2	3	4	5	6	7	8	9	10	11	12	13	14	15	16	17	18	19	20	21	22	23	24	25	26	27	NCTC	Pts	Ref
1998		62	Chevy	WDW	HOM	PHO	POR	EVG	I70	GLN	TEX	BRI	MLW	NZH	CAL	PPR	IRP	NHA	FLM	NSV	HPT	LVL	RCH	MEM	GTY	MAR; DNQ	SON	MMR	PHO	LVS	116th	43	
2001	Green Light Racing	07	Chevy	DAY	HOM	MMR	MAR	GTY	DAR	PPR	DOV	TEX	MEM	MLW	KAN	KEN	NHA; 29	IRP	NSH	CIC	NZH; 30	RCH	SBO	TEX	LVS	PHO	CAL				82nd	149	
2008	SS-Green Light Racing	0	Chevy	DAY	CAL	ATL	MAR	KAN	CLT	MFD	DOV	TEX	MCH	MLW	MEM	KEN	IRP	NSH	BRI	GTW	NHA; 32	LVS	TAL	MAR	ATL	TEX	PHO	HOM			117th	0	

==== Camping World East Series ====
NASCAR Camping World East Series results
Year	Team	No.	Make	1	2	3	4	5	6	7	8	9	10	11	12	13	14	15	16	17	18	19	20	21	22	23	24	NCWEC	Pts	Ref
1989	Olsen Racing	61	Buick	DAY	CAR	MAR	OXF; 30	NZH	MND; 17	OXF; 16	DOV	OXF; 41	JEN; 14	EPP; 16	HOL; 9	OXF; 17	JEN; 12	OXF; 27	IRP	TMP; 26	OXF; 22	RPS; 11	OXF; 30	RCH	DOV	EPP		14th	1662	
1990	Olsen Racing	61	Buick	DAY	RCH	CAR	MAR	OXF; 31	NZH	OXF; 20	DOV	JEN; 25	EPP; 11	MND; DNQ	OXF	NHA	HOL; 14	OXF; 16	IRP	OXF; 17	TMP; 16	RPS; 14	NHA; 33	TMP; 16	DOV	EPP; 12	NHA	17th	1375	
1991	Olsen Racing	61	Buick	DAY	RCH	CAR	NHA; 18	OXF; 28	NZH	MND; 13	OXF; 10	TMP; 15	HOL; 19	JEN; 22	EPP; 24	STA; 15	OXF	NHA	FLE; 11	OXF; 14	TMP; 29	NHA; 25	RPS; 15	TMP; 31	DOV	EPP; 16	NHA	18th	1691	
1992	Olsen Racing	61	Buick	DAY	CAR	RCH	NHA	NZH	MND	OXF	DOV	LEE	JEN	OXF; 18	NHA	OXF; 21	HOL	EPP; 11	NHA	RPS; 15	OXF; 22	NHA; 26	EPP; 17					28th	767	
1993	Olsen Racing	61	Buick	LEE; 16	NHA; 38	MND; 25	NZH	HOL; 17	GLN; 9	JEN; 25	STA; 7	GLN	NHA; 15	WIS; 5	NHA; 25	NHA	RPS; 3	TMP; 22	WMM; 10	LEE; 9	EPP; 27	LRP; 16						15th	1828	
1994	Olsen Racing	61	Buick	NHA; 18	NHA	MND; 8	NZH	SPE	HOL; 10	GLN; 34	JEN	EPP	GLN	NHA; 27	WIS; 3	STA	TMP	MND; 13	WMM; 9		LEE; 17	NHA; 29	LRP					22nd	1381	
1994	Mitchell Racing	33	Pontiac																	RPS; 9								22nd	1381	
1995	Olsen Racing	61	Buick	DAY	NHA	LEE; 5	JEN	NHA	NZH	HOL	BEE; 26	TMP	GLN	NHA	TIO	MND	GLN	EPP	RPS	LEE	STA	BEE	NHA; 19	TMP	LRP; 23			43rd	504	
1996	Olsen Racing	61	Pontiac	DAY	LEE; 12	JEN; 16	NZH; 21	HOL; 20	NHA; 12	TIO; 9	**BEE**; 9	TMP; 14	NZH; 11	NHA; 29	STA; 26	GLN; 30	EPP; 25	RPS; 16	LEE; 18	NHA; 14	NHA; 21	BEE; 8	TMP; 18	LRP; 27				15th	2126	
1997	Olsen Racing	61	Pontiac	DAY	LEE; 15	JEN; 8	NHA; 9		HOL; 10	NHA; 10	STA; 9	BEE; 8	TMP; 31	NZH; 31	TIO; 8	NHA; 9	STA; 12	THU; 20	GLN; 6	EPP; 8	RPS; 24	BEE; 7	TMP; 6	NHA; 15	LRP; 6			9th	2558	
1997	Olsen Racing	61	Chevy					NZH; 26																				9th	2558	
1998	Olsen Racing	61	Pontiac	LEE; 6	RPS; 25	NHA; 26		HOL; 13	GLN	STA; 5	NHA; 5	DOV; 20	STA; 11	NHA; 39	GLN; 9	EPP; 9	JEN; 4	NHA; 9	THU; 14	TMP; 30	BEE; 16	LRP; 21						9th	2061	
1998	Olsen Racing	61	Chevy				NZH; 25																					9th	2061	
1999	Olsen Racing	61	Pontiac	LEE; 2		NHA; 7												GLN; 13										4th	2424	
1999	Olsen Racing	61	Chevy		RPS; 26		TMP; 5	NZH; DNQ	HOL; 2	**BEE**; 2*	JEN; 24		STA; 11	NHA; 16	NZH; 5	STA; 21	NHA; 33		EPP; 24	THU; 7	BEE; 8	NHA; 5	LRP; 2					4th	2424	
1999	Olsen Racing	81	Chevy									GLN; 18																4th	2424	
2000	Olsen Racing	61	Chevy	LEE; 4	NHA; 12	SEE; 4	HOL; 4	BEE; 2	JEN; 6	GLN; 42	STA; 17	NHA; 28	NZH; 27	STA; 19	WFD; 7	GLN; 5	EPP; 11	TMP; 12	THU; 7	BEE; 10	NHA; 7	LRP; 3						5th	2376	
2001	Olsen Racing	61	Chevy	LEE; 3	NHA; 10	SEE; 4	**HOL**; 2*	BEE; 1	EPP; 1*	STA; 7	WFD; 13	BEE; 5	TMP; 2	NHA; 12	STA; 2	SEE; 5	GLN; 14	NZH; 6	**THU**; 4*	BEE; 2	DOV; 18	STA; 11	LRP; 5					1st	3031	
2002	Olsen Racing	61	Chevy	LEE; 2*	NHA; 9	NZH; 9	**SEE**; 11	BEE; 25	STA; 29	HOL; 15	WFD; 8*	TMP; 22	NHA; 15	STA; 11	GLN; 10	ADI; 7	**THU**; 1*	BEE; 9*	NHA; 5	DOV; 15	STA; 25	LRP; 8						10th	2446	
2003	Olsen Racing	61	Chevy	LEE; 10	STA; 27	ERI; 9	BEE; 23	STA; 6	HOL; 4	TMP; 7	NHA; 6	WFD; 11	SEE; 8	GLN; 9	ADI; 4	**BEE**; 1*	THU; 14*	NHA; 19	STA; 23	LRP; 14								9th	2271	
2004	Olsen Racing	61	Chevy	LEE; 8	TMP; 8	LRP; 3	SEE; 2	STA; 4	HOL; 2	ERI; 3*	WFD; 4	**NHA**; 8	ADI; 3	GLN; 19	NHA; 30	DOV; 9												2nd	1933	
2005	Olsen Racing	61	Chevy	STA; 7	HOL; 12	ERI; 7	NHA; 7	WFD; 4	ADI; 5	STA; 5	DUB; 4	OXF; 6	NHA; 13	DOV; 13	LRP; 2	TMP; 3												4th	1933	
2006	Olsen Racing	61	Chevy	**GRE**; 3	STA; 3	HOL; 3	TMP; 6	**ERI**; 1	NHA; 1	ADI; 3	WFD; 4	NHA; 9	DOV; 5	LRP; 3														1st	1823	
2007	Olsen Racing	61	Chevy	GRE; 7	ELK; 4	IOW; 12	SBO; 7	STA; 2	NHA; 11	TMP; 3	NSH; 30	ADI; 22	LRP; 9	MFD; 12	NHA; 18	DOV; 15												6th	1721	
2008	Olsen Racing	61	Chevy	GRE	IOW	SBO	GLN	NHA; 7	TMP	NSH	ADI	LRP; 5	MFD	NHA; 7	DOV													26th	574	
2008	Olsen Racing	16	Chevy													STA; 12												26th	574	
2009	Olsen Racing	61	Chevy	GRE	TRI	IOW	SBO	GLN	NHA; 13	TMP	ADI	LRP; 5	NHA	DOV														37th	279	

==== K&N Pro Series West ====
NASCAR K&N Pro Series West results
Year	Team	No.	Make	1	2	3	4	5	6	7	8	9	10	11	12	13	14	15	NKNPSWC	Pts	Ref
2012	NDS Motorsports	53	Dodge	PHO	LHC	MMP	S99	IOW	BIR	LVS	SON	EVG	CNS	IOW	PIR; 24	SMP	AAS	PHO	80th	20	

^{*} Season still in progress
^{1} Ineligible for series points
^{2} Competed only in companion events with Busch North Series as BNS driver and ineligible for Busch Series points

Sporting positions
Preceded by Andy Santerre	NASCAR Busch East Series Champion; 2006	Succeeded by Joey Logano
Preceded by Brad Leighton	NASCAR Busch North Series Champion; 2001	Succeeded by Andy Santerre
