= Brad Leighton =

American racing driver

- Born: June 12, 1962 (age 64) Center Harbor, New Hampshire, U.S.

NASCAR Busch North Series
- Years active: 1995–2009
- Starts: 164
- Wins: 24
- Poles: 5
- Best finish: 1st in 1999–2000

Championship titles
- 1999–2000: NASCAR Busch North Series

NASCAR O'Reilly Auto Parts Series career
- 5 races run over 2 years
- Best finish: 100th (1997)
- First race: 1997 United States Cellular 200 (Loudon)
- Last race: 1999 Kroger 200 (IRP)
Wins	Top tens	Poles
0	0	0

Brad Leighton (born June 12, 1962) is an American former stock car racing driver. He competed in five career Busch Series events in his career.

Leighton made his career debut at New Hampshire International Speedway in May 1997, running the No. 5 Chevy owned by Terry Labonte.He started the race in 30th and only managed to move to 27th by the end of the day after a late crash. However, Leighton did lead one lap—an impressive stat in his first career start.

In 1999, Leighton made four more starts, all for BACE Motorsports. In his season debut, he finished 34th at Nazareth Speedway despite fatigue. He was last at Watkins Glen due to transmission failure, 37th at Milwaukee and 36th at IRP. Not only was Milwaukee the only race he finished in 1999, it was the site of his best career start, at 23rd.

Leighton's poor results, however, led to his lack of a ride for 2000, and he has not raced in the Busch Series since. He however had had a productive career in the Busch North Series, winning back-to-back championships in 1999 and 2000.

== Motorsports career results ==
=== NASCAR ===
(key) (Bold – Pole position awarded by qualifying time. Italics – Pole position earned by points standings or practice time. * – Most laps led.)

==== Busch Series ====
NASCAR Busch Series results
Year	Team	No.	Make	1	2	3	4	5	6	7	8	9	10	11	12	13	14	15	16	17	18	19	20	21	22	23	24	25	26	27	28	29	30	31	32	NBSC	Pts
1997	Labonte Motorsports	5	Chevy	DAY	CAR	RCH	ATL	LVS	DAR	HCY	TEX	BRI	NSV	TAL	NHA; 27	NZH	CLT	DOV	SBO	GLN	MLW	MYB	GTY	IRP	MCH	BRI	DAR	RCH	DOV	CLT	CAL	CAR	HOM			100th	79
1999	BACE Motorsports	33	Chevy	DAY	CAR	LVS	ATL	DAR	TEX	NSV	BRI	TAL	CAL	NHA	RCH	NZH; 34	CLT	DOV	SBO	GLN; 43	MLW; 37	MYB	PPR	GTY	IRP; 36	MCH	BRI	DAR	RCH	DOV	CLT	CAR	MEM	PHO	HOM	108th	107

Sporting positions
Preceded by Mike Stefanik	NASCAR Busch North Series champion 1999, 2000	Succeeded by Mike Olsen
Preceded by Mike Rowe	American-Canadian Tour champion 1995	Succeeded by Series ended
