= Innovative Motorsports =

Former NASCAR team

- Owner: George DeBidart
- Base: Charlotte, North Carolina
- Series: Winston Cup, Busch Series, Craftsman Truck Series
- Race drivers: Andy Santerre, Mike McLaughlin, Chad Little, Kenny Wallace, Shane Hmiel, Robert Huffman, Hank Parker Jr.
- Manufacturer: Chevrolet, Toyota
- Opened: 1998
- Closed: 2005

Career
- Drivers' Championships: 0
- Race victories: 2

Innovative Motorsports (IMI) is a former NASCAR team. It was owned by George DeBidart and began racing in the Busch North Series in the mid-1990s, before moving to the Busch Series in 1998.

== Winston Cup ==
Innovative ran four Cup races during its tenure. Using the No. 98 Chevy purchased from Michael Waltrip Racing, Kenny Wallace ran the Pepsi 400, the Tropicana 400, the Brickyard 400, and the Sirius at the Glen. His best finish was 29th.

=== Car No. 98 results ===
Year	Driver	No.	Make	1	2	3	4	5	6	7	8	9	10	11	12	13	14	15	16	17	18	19	20	21	22	23	24	25	26	27	28	29	30	31	32	33	34	35	36	NWCC	Pts
2002	Kenny Wallace	98	Chevy	DAY	CAR	LVS	ATL	DAR	BRI	TEX	MAR	TAL	CAL	RCH	CLT	DOV	POC	MCH	SON	DAY; 42	CHI; 29	NHA	POC	IND; 32	GLN; 36	MCH	BRI	DAR	RCH	NHA	DOV	KAN	TAL	CLT	MAR	ATL	CAR	PHO	HOM	54th	240

== Busch Series ==
=== Car No. 47 history ===
Innovative debuted on the Busch Circuit at the 1998 NAPA Auto Parts 300. Andy Santerre was the driver of the car, the No. 47 Monro Muffler and Brake Chevrolet Monte Carlo, and finished 25th. Santerre was the driver for the whole season, grabbing two top-tens, a pole at Richmond, and NASCAR Busch Series Rookie of the Year honors. The next season, Santerre suffered a broken leg in a crash at Daytona, and missed half of the year. Elliott Sadler filled in for him, posting two top-ten finishes. Santerre returned and won his first career race at Pikes Peak International Raceway. Santerre struggled making the field, and was released. Hermie Sadler finished the year, his best finish a 22nd at Phoenix.

Sadler took over the car full-time in 2000, as it was renumbered the No. 30 and receiving sponsorship from Little Trees. Sadler struggled making races as well, and would soon be released. Chad Little replaced him, but when his performance didn't improve over Sadler's, Sadler came back to finish the year, and posted a seventh-place run at Pikes Peak.

After the team did not run in 2001, it returned in 2002 as the No. 47 with rookie Shane Hmiel driving with sponsorship from Mike's Hard Lemonade. Hmiel had two poles, eight top-tens and a sixteenth-place points finish, finishing behind Scott Riggs and Johnny Sauter for Rookie of the Year. The team closed after that.

==== Car No. 47 results ====
Year	Driver	No.	Make	1	2	3	4	5	6	7	8	9	10	11	12	13	14	15	16	17	18	19	20	21	22	23	24	25	26	27	28	29	30	31	32	33	34	Owners	Pts
1998	Andy Santerre	47	Chevy	DAY; 25	CAR; 25	LVS; 26	NSV; 16	DAR; 37	BRI; 11	TEX; 19	HCY; 29	TAL; 38	NHA; 17	NZH; 34	CLT; DNQ	DOV; 37	RCH; 43	PPR; 22	GLN; 12	MLW; 23	MYB; 13	CAL; 34	SBO; 15	IRP; 29	MCH; 36	BRI; 16	DAR; 20	RCH; 10	DOV; 38	CLT; DNQ	GTY; 4	CAR; 23	ATL; 21	HOM; 40				26th	2609
1999	Andy Santerre	47	Chevy	DAY; 42														DOV; DNQ	SBO; DNQ	GLN; 30	MLW; 13	MYB; DNQ	PPR; 1	GTY; 19	IRP; 35		BRI; 13	DAR; DNQ										31st	2238
1999	Mike Swaim Jr.	47	Chevy		CAR; 40																																	31st	2238
1999	Elliott Sadler	47	Chevy			LVS; 7	ATL; 42	DAR; 35	TEX; 42	NSV; 16	BRI; DNQ	TAL	CAL; 5	NHA; 15	RCH; 35	NZH; 12	CLT; 28																					31st	2238
1999	Ricky Craven	47	Chevy																							MCH; DNQ												31st	2238
1999	Ward Burton	47	Chevy																										RCH; 32									31st	2238
1999	Hermie Sadler	47	Chevy																											DOV; 42	CLT; DNQ	CAR; DNQ	MEM; 23	PHO; 22	HOM; 30			31st	2238
2000	Hermie Sadler	30	Chevy	DAY; 14	CAR; 20	LVS; DNQ	ATL; DNQ	DAR; 41	BRI; DNQ												MLW; 17	NZH; 11	PPR; 7	GTY; 27	IRP; 17	MCH; 36		DAR; 31		DOV; 27		CAR; 24	MEM; 23	PHO; 30	HOM; 42			34th	2256
2000	Chad Little	30	Chevy							TEX; DNQ		TAL; DNQ	CAL; 12	RCH; DNQ		CLT; 31	DOV; DNQ																					34th	2256
2000	Philip Morris	30	Chevy								NSV; DNQ							SBO; 28	MYB; 36								BRI; 40		RCH; 42		CLT; 32							34th	2256
2000	Mike Olsen	30	Chevy												NHA; 26																							34th	2256
2000	Butch Leitzinger	30	Chevy																	GLN; 2																		34th	2256
2002	Shane Hmiel	47	Pontiac	DAY; 5							TAL; 21										DAY; 34																	21st	3416
2002	Shane Hmiel	47	Chevy		CAR; 36	LVS; 42	DAR; 19	BRI; 10	TEX; 26	NSH; 19		CAL; 23	RCH; 21	NHA; 4	NZH; 19	CLT; 31	DOV; 33	NSH; 9	KEN; 19	MLW; 6		CHI; 23	GTY; 26	PPR; 24	IRP; 39	MCH; 25	BRI; 24	DAR; 29	RCH; 28	DOV; 10	KAN; 14	CLT; 10	MEM; 11	ATL; 20	CAR; 8	PHO; 41	HOM; 16	21st	3416
2003	Regan Smith	47	Chevy	DAY	CAR	LVS	DAR	BRI	TEX	TAL	NSH	CAL	RCH	GTY	NZH	CLT	DOV	NSH	KEN	MLW	DAY	CHI	NHA	PPR; 40	IRP	MCH	BRI	DAR	RCH	DOV	KAN	CLT	MEM	ATL	PHO	CAR	HOM	121st	0

=== Car No. 48 history ===
The second Innovative car made its debut in 2000 at Daytona with Mike McLaughlin, sponsored by Goulds Pumps. He wrecked and finished 26th. McLaughlin struggled through the course of the season, and had six top-tens en route to a 24th-place points finish. Just before the 2001 season, McLaughlin quit the team for Joe Gibbs Racing, and was replaced by Kenny Wallace. Wallace had two poles as well as a victory in North Carolina Speedway, finishing 10th in points. After Stacker 2 came on as a sponsor, Wallace improved to seventh in points in 2002 and had thirteen top-tens, but did not win. After the No. 47 team closed its doors, Hmiel moved to the 48 and had ten top-tens and was in eighth in points, when he was suspended by NASCAR for violating its drug policy. Jeff Green, Todd Bodine, Carlos Contreras, Randy LaJoie, and Kerry Earnhardt finished out the year for the team.

==== Car No. 48 results ====
Year	Driver	No.	Make	1	2	3	4	5	6	7	8	9	10	11	12	13	14	15	16	17	18	19	20	21	22	23	24	25	26	27	28	29	30	31	32	33	34	Owners	Pts	Ref
2000	Mike McLaughlin	48	Chevy	DAY; 26	CAR; 15	LVS; 43	ATL; 21	DAR; 33	BRI; 42	TEX; 40	NSV; 2	TAL; 14	CAL; 41	RCH; 25	NHA; 33	CLT; 32	DOV; 10	SBO; 24	MYB; 30	GLN; 5	MLW; 28	NZH; 34	PPR; 8	GTY; 36	IRP; 34	MCH; 5	BRI; 28		RCH; 30	DOV; 34	CLT; 39	CAR; 16	MEM; 24	PHO; 15	HOM; 31			23rd	2845	
2000	Ward Burton	48	Chevy																									DAR; 5										23rd	2845	
2001	Kenny Wallace	48	Chevy	DAY; 8	CAR; 4	LVS; 24	ATL; 19	DAR; 4	BRI; 5	TEX; 43	NSH; 36	TAL; 10	CAL; 38	RCH; 8	NHA; 5	NZH; 32	CLT; 30	DOV; 12	KEN; 35	MLW; 16	GLN; 11	CHI; 14	GTY; 6	PPR; 9	IRP; 11	MCH; 22	BRI; 3	DAR; 18	RCH; 23	DOV; 2	KAN; 25	CLT; 32	MEM; 21	PHO; 10	CAR; 1	HOM; 25		12th	3799	
2002	Kenny Wallace	48	Chevy	DAY; 10	CAR; 12	LVS; 8	DAR; 5	BRI; 6	TEX; 25	NSH; 11		CAL; 14	RCH; 17	NHA; 26	NZH; 12	CLT; 12	DOV; 7	NSH; 6	KEN; 9	MLW; 18		CHI; 28	GTY; 19	PPR; 13	IRP; 5	MCH; 18	BRI; 6	DAR; 11	RCH; 10	DOV; 9	KAN; 22	CLT; 22	MEM; 19	ATL; 18	CAR; 9	PHO; 30	HOM; 24	8th	4078	
2002	Kenny Wallace	48	Pontiac								TAL; 9										DAY; 35																	8th	4078	
2003	Shane Hmiel	48	Pontiac	DAY; 17						TAL; 3											DAY; 10																	13th	3866	
2003	Shane Hmiel	48	Chevy		CAR; 35	LVS; 12	DAR; 13	BRI; 7	TEX; 3		NSH; 14	CAL; 8	RCH; 8	GTY; 13	NZH; 19	CLT; 38	DOV; 13	NSH; 34	KEN; 19	MLW; 18		CHI; 16	NHA; 15	PPR; 14	IRP; 4*	MCH; 9	BRI; 4	DAR; 28	RCH; 10									13th	3866	
2003	Jeff Green	48	Chevy																											DOV; 39		CLT; 24						13th	3866	
2003	Todd Bodine	48	Chevy																												KAN; 29			ATL; 18		CAR; 19		13th	3866	
2003	Randy LaJoie	48	Chevy																														MEM; 30					13th	3866	
2003	Kerry Earnhardt	48	Chevy																																PHO; 25			13th	3866	
2003	Carlos Contreras	48	Chevy																																		HOM; 17	13th	3866	

==== Car No. 30 results ====
Year	Driver	No.	Make	1	2	3	4	5	6	7	8	9	10	11	12	13	14	15	16	17	18	19	20	21	22	23	24	25	26	27	28	29	30	31	32	33	34	Owners	Pts	Ref
2001	Christian Fittipaldi	30	Chevy	DAY	CAR	LVS	ATL	DAR	BRI	TEX	NSH	TAL	CAL	RCH	NHA	NZH	CLT	DOV	KEN	MLW	GLN	CHI	GTY	PPR	IRP	MCH	BRI	DAR	RCH	DOV	KAN	CLT	MEM	PHO	CAR	HOM; 39			46	
2002	Christian Fittipaldi	30	Chevy	DAY	CAR	LVS	DAR	BRI	TEX	NSH	TAL	CAL	RCH; DNQ	NHA	NZH	CLT; DNQ	DOV	NSH	KEN	MLW	DAY	CHI	GTY; 35	PPR	IRP	MCH	BRI	DAR	RCH	DOV	KAN; 43	CLT	MEM; QL^{†}	ATL	CAR	PHO	HOM			
2002	Chad Chaffin	30	Chevy																														MEM; 42							

== Craftsman Truck Series ==
In 2004, Innovative closed its Busch teams, and signed with Toyota to field entries in the Craftsman Truck Series, the No. 12 driven by Robert Huffman and the No. 21 driven by Hank Parker Jr. Huffman, a rookie, had six top-tens, but failed to finish nine races and ended up twenty-third in points. Parker Jr. had four top-tens and finished 17th in points. Due to a lack of funding, Innovative closed up for good at the end of the season, with Huffman's team being sold to Darrell Waltrip Motorsports, and Parker's team to Capital Motorsports.

=== Truck No. 12 Results ===
Year	Team	No.	Make	1	2	3	4	5	6	7	8	9	10	11	12	13	14	15	16	17	18	19	20	21	22	23	24	25	NCTS	Pts
2004	Robert Huffman	12	Toyota	DAY; 36	ATL; 29	MAR; 34	MFD; DNQ	CLT; 16	DOV; 11	TEX; 28	MEM; 16	MLW; 36	KAN; 24	KEN; 10	GTW; 27	MCH; 9	IRP; 23	NSH; 8	BRI; 32	RCH; 6	NHA; 32	LVS; 31	CAL; 17	TEX; 29	MAR; 10	PHO; 31	DAR; 9	HOM; 35	25th	2363

=== Truck No. 21 Results ===
Year	Team	No.	Make	1	2	3	4	5	6	7	8	9	10	11	12	13	14	15	16	17	18	19	20	21	22	23	24	25	NCTS	Pts
2004	Hank Parker, Jr.	21	Toyota	DAY; 18	ATL; 33	MAR; 12	MFD; 19	CLT; 22	DOV; 3	TEX; 23	MEM; 12	MLW; 17	KAN; 21	KEN; 22	GTW; 5	MCH; 29	IRP; 15	NSH; 15	BRI; 6	RCH; 20	NHA; 9	LVS; 21	CAL; 15	TEX; 13	MAR; 31	PHO; 23	DAR; 35	HOM; 17	17th	2737
