= Andy Santerre =

American race car driver and team owner

- Born: September 7, 1968 (age 58); Cherryfield, Maine, U.S.
- Achievements: 2002, 2003, 2004, 2005 NASCAR Busch North Series Champion
- Awards: 1998 NASCAR Busch Series Rookie of the Year

NASCAR O'Reilly Auto Parts Series career
- 68 races run over 9 years
- Best finish: 20th (1998)
- First race: 1993 NE Chevy 250 (New Hampshire)
- Last race: 2002 Stacker 2 200 (Nazareth)
- First win: 1999 NAPA Autocare 250 (Pikes Peak)
Wins	Top tens	Poles
1	7	1

NASCAR FedEx Freight Truck Series career
- 1 race run over 1 year
- Best finish: 88th (2000)
- First race: 2000 Bully Hill Vineyards 150 (Watkins Glen)
Wins	Top tens	Poles
0	0	0

Anthony Lee Santerre (born September 7, 1968) is an American former stock car racing driver. He competed in the NASCAR Busch Series and was a four-time champion of the NASCAR Busch North Series.

== Personal life ==
At the age of 19, Santerre was diagnosed with Guillain–Barré syndrome, which had him hospitalized for several months.

== Busch Series and Craftsman Truck Series career ==
Andy Santerre made his Busch debut in 1993, driving for his own No. 15 O'Connor Buick team. He ran his first and only race of the year at NHIS, starting the race in 11th position and finishing the race in 14th.

Santerre made two starts in 1994. He ran the No. 51 Chevy at Nazareth and finished 18th. The next time out, running the No. 1 Primetime Van Oldsmobile Cutlass Supreme, Santerre set his best qualifying effort to that point of eighth in the field at Watkins Glen International. However, he only ran four laps and finished 39th with transmission problems.

All three of those races, however, were combination Busch North-Busch Grand National Series races, a procedure popular in NASCAR until the Winston West and Busch North Series were combined into a single rules package, to increase car counts in regional races.

Santerre made a Busch Series start in 1996 while earning points a Busch North driver, when he drove the No. 35 Ford for Mike Laughlin Jr. at Daytona. He started deep in the pack in 40th, but had a 22nd-place finish.

Santerre made his official Busch Series debut in a one-off appearance in 1997. All Busch Series finishes through 1996 for Santerre were 'combination races' with the Busch North Series. Once again driving for Laughlin, Santerre started the No. 45 Hunters Specialties Chevy at New Hampshire. He started 16th and upped his position by one to 15th. Also, Santerre led his first lap of Busch Series competition during a green flag pit cycle.

Santerre, after numerous wins in the Busch North Series, moved South in 1998, where he would win Rookie of the Year with Innovative Motorsports. However, despite the award, it was still a tough season. Santerre's best finishes were a 4th at Gateway and a tenth at Richmond. He had a pole at Richmond and finished 20th in overall points, despite missing two races.

Santerre began 1999 with a broken leg at Daytona, and was not able to return to the No. 47 Chevy for 16 races, returning with a 30th at the Glen. Yet, just three races later, Santerre took control late in the race at Pikes Peak. Leading seventeen laps, earned his first career victory. Despite this, Santerre was released four races later.

Santerre ran seventeen races in 2000, sharing a ride Kenny Wallace in the No. 25 Lance Snacks Chevy for Team Rensi Motorsports. His best finish was at Pikes Peak, where he had a third-place finish. He also tallied on three other top-tens. Also in 2000, Santerre made his only career Craftsman Truck Series start. Driving the No. 57 Whelen Ford, Santerre made the 2000 Watkins Glen race. Once again, Santerre made a good debut. He started 21st, ran on the lead lap and finished 16th.

In 2001, Santerre ran 13 races for three teams. Running for the No. 01 EJP team, the No. 11 Channellock team and the No. 31 Whelen team. For the third straight year, the No. 11 Chevy at Pikes Peak recorded Santerre's best finish of the year of 13th place. Overall, Santerre had four top-20 finishes.

Santerre made his last two starts in 2002. He earned a 38th at New Hampshire and 36th at Nazareth. At that point, Santerre dropped all Busch Series racing and went back to the North Series.

== Busch North Series / East Series career ==
Santerre stayed in the Charlotte area, and based his Busch North team in the middle of Charlotte, becoming a four-time champion of the Busch North Series, holding the record for most series championships, and winning them consecutively from 2002 to 2005.

At the end of the 2005 season, Santerre stepped out of the car and concentrated on managing Grizco Racing, a Busch East Series team owned by Steve and Peg Griswold, which became Andy Santerre Motorsports. With driver Sean Caisse, the team finished second to Mike Olsen, the grandson of popular Northeastern driver Stub Fadden, in the 2006 Busch East Championship. Caisse also drew the attention of Kevin Harvick, who signed him to a driver development contract.

In 2007, Caisse was joined by Jeffrey Earnhardt, son of Kerry Earnhardt and grandson of Dale Earnhardt, to race in a second Santerre Camping World East car under NASCAR's new rule reducing the minimum age in the Grand National and Whelen Modified divisions to 16. Caisse won four races and finished second in points to champion and rookie of the year Joey Logano. Earnhardt would place fifth in the standings. Caisse and Earnhardt would move on from Andy Santerre Motorsports to pursue other opportunities.

In 2008, Richard Childress' grandson and RCR development driver 17-year-old Austin Dillon signed on to drive the No. 3 Garage Equipment Supply Chevrolet for Andy Santerre Motorsports.

After running his own team in the Camping World East/K&N Pro Series East series for several years, Santerre spent two years as competition director for Rev Racing, and in 2012 joined Hattori Racing Enterprises in that position. After the 2012 season, he accepted a non-racing job offer in his native Maine, announcing his semi-retirement from racing activities.

== Motorsports career results ==
=== NASCAR ===
(key) (Bold – Pole position awarded by qualifying time. Italics – Pole position earned by points standings or practice time. * – Most laps led.)

==== Busch Series ====
NASCAR Busch Series results
Year	Team	No.	Make	1	2	3	4	5	6	7	8	9	10	11	12	13	14	15	16	17	18	19	20	21	22	23	24	25	26	27	28	29	30	31	32	33	34	NBSC	Pts
1993	Charles O'Connor	15	Buick	DAY	CAR	RCH	DAR	BRI	HCY	ROU	MAR	NZH	CLT	DOV	MYB	GLN	MLW	TAL	IRP	MCH	NHA; 14	BRI	DAR	RCH	DOV	ROU	CLT	MAR	CAR	HCY	ATL							93rd	121
1994	H&H Motorsports	51	Chevy	DAY	CAR	RCH	ATL	MAR	DAR	HCY	BRI	ROU	NHA	NZH; 18	CLT	DOV	MYB																					82nd	155
1994	Team Goewey	1	Olds															GLN; 39	MLW	SBO	TAL	HCY	IRP	MCH	BRI	DAR	RCH	DOV	CLT	MAR	CAR							82nd	155
1996	Laughlin Racing	35	Ford	DAY; 22	CAR	RCH	ATL	NSV	DAR	BRI	HCY	NZH	CLT	DOV	SBO	MYB	GLN	MLW	NHA	TAL	IRP	MCH	BRI	DAR	RCH	DOV	CLT	CAR	HOM									88th	97
1997	Laughlin Racing	45	Chevy	DAY	CAR	RCH	ATL	LVS	DAR	HCY	TEX	BRI	NSV	TAL	NHA; 15	NZH	CLT	DOV	SBO	GLN	MLW	MYB	GTY	IRP	MCH	BRI	DAR	RCH	DOV	CLT	CAL	CAR	HOM					85th	118
1998	Innovative Motorsports	47	Chevy	DAY; 25	CAR; 25	LVS; 26	NSV; 16	DAR; 37	BRI; 11	TEX; 19	HCY; 29	TAL; 38	NHA; 17	NZH; 34	CLT; DNQ	DOV; 37	RCH; 43	PPR; 22	GLN; 12	MLW; 23	MYB; 13	CAL; 34	SBO; 15	IRP; 29	MCH; 36	BRI; 16	DAR; 20	**RCH**; 10	DOV; 38	CLT; DNQ	GTY; 4	CAR; 23	ATL; 21	HOM; 40				20th	2598
1999	Innovative Motorsports	47	Chevy	DAY; 42	CAR	LVS	ATL	DAR	TEX	NSV	BRI	TAL	CAL	NHA	RCH	NZH	CLT	DOV; DNQ	SBO; DNQ	GLN; 30	MLW; 13	MYB; DNQ	PPR; 1	GTY; 19	IRP; 35	MCH	BRI; 13	DAR; DNQ	RCH	DOV	CLT	CAR	MEM	PHO				57th	702
1999	Labonte Motorsports	44	Chevy																																HOM; DNQ			57th	702
2000	Team Rensi Motorsports	25	Chevy	DAY	CAR	LVS; 30	ATL	DAR	BRI	TEX; 20	NSV; 15	TAL	CAL; 21	RCH	NHA; 6	CLT	DOV; 39	SBO; 10	MYB; 19	GLN; 27	MLW; 14	NZH; 23	PPR; 3	GTY	IRP; 10	MCH	BRI	DAR	RCH	DOV	CLT	CAR	MEM; 32	PHO	HOM			34th	1498
2001	Santerre-Reece Motorsports	01	Chevy	DAY	CAR; 23	LVS	ATL	DAR	BRI; 31	TEX	NSH; 33	TAL	CAL	RCH	NHA; 27	NZH	CLT	DOV	KEN	MLW	GLN; 18	CHI																44th	928
2001	HighLine Performance Group	11	Chevy																				GTY; 16	PPR; 13	IRP; 17	MCH	BRI	DAR	RCH	DOV								44th	928
2001	Marsh Racing	31	Chevy																												KAN; 32	CLT	MEM	PHO; 42	CAR	HOM; 38		44th	928
2002	Santerre Racing	01	Chevy	DAY	CAR	LVS	DAR	BRI	TEX	NSH	TAL	CAL	RCH	NHA; 38	NZH; 36	CLT	DOV	NSH	KEN	MLW	DAY	CHI	GTY	PPR	IRP	MCH	BRI	DAR	RCH	DOV	KAN	CLT	MEM	ATL	CAR	PHO	HOM	96th	104

==== Craftsman Truck Series ====
NASCAR Craftsman Truck Series results
Year	Team	No.	Make	1	2	3	4	5	6	7	8	9	10	11	12	13	14	15	16	17	18	19	20	21	22	23	24	NCTC	Pts
2000	Santerre Racing	57	Ford	DAY	HOM	PHO	MMR	MAR	PIR	GTY	MEM	PPR	EVG	TEX	KEN	GLN; 16	MLW	NHA	NZH	MCH	IRP	NSV	CIC	RCH	DOV	TEX	CAL	88th	115

Sporting positions
Preceded by Mike Olsen	NASCAR Busch North Series champion 2002, 2003, 2004, 2005	Succeeded by Mike Olsen
Achievements
Preceded by Steve Park	NASCAR Nationwide Series Rookie of the Year; 1998	Succeeded by Tony Raines
