= 2016 Ford EcoBoost 300 =

Race details
- Map of Speedway
- Date: November 19, 2016
- Official name: 2016 Ford EcoBoost 300
- Location: Homestead-Miami Speedway in Homestead, Florida
- Course: Oval
- Course length: 1.5 miles (2.4 km)
- Distance: 200 laps, 300 mi (482.803 km)
- Weather: Clear
- Average speed: 116.445 mph (187.400 km/h)

Pole position
Driver	Daniel Suárez	Joe Gibbs Racing
- Time: 31.779

Most laps led
Driver	Daniel Suárez	Joe Gibbs Racing
- Laps: 133

Winner
No. 19	Daniel Suárez	Joe Gibbs Racing

Television in the United States
- Network: NBCSN
- Announcers: Rick Allen, Jeff Burton, Steve Letarte

The 2016 Ford EcoBoost 300 was a NASCAR Xfinity Series race held at Homestead-Miami Speedway in Homestead, Florida on November 19, 2016. The race was the 33rd and final race of the 2016 NASCAR Xfinity Series season and the 22nd iteration of the event. Daniel Suárez would dominate the whole race winning the pole, leading the most laps at 133, and winning the race which would all culminate in him winning the 2016 NASCAR Xfinity Series championship. Suárez became the first Mexican born driver to win a NASCAR championship in the top 3 series.

== Background ==
Homestead–Miami Speedway is a motor racing track located in Homestead, Florida. The track, which has several configurations, has promoted several series of racing, including NASCAR, the IndyCar Series, the WeatherTech SportsCar Championship series, and the Championship Cup Series.

From 2002 to 2019, Homestead–Miami Speedway had hosted the final race of the season in all three of NASCAR's series as Ford Championship Weekend: the NASCAR Cup Series, NASCAR Xfinity Series, and the NASCAR Camping World Truck Series. The races currently have the names Dixie Vodka 400, Contender Boats 250, and Baptist Health 200, respectively.

=== Championship battle ===
This was the first year the NASCAR Xfinity Series had the playoff format where only four drivers can win the Championship in the end. The four drivers that would contend for the Xfinity Series championship would be Elliott Sadler, Justin Allgaier, Daniel Suárez, and Erik Jones. Jones would be the only rookie to compete for the Championship. Allgaier was the only winless driver to compete for the Championship. All four drivers would get in by points.

=== Entry list ===
- (R) denotes rookie driver
- (i) denotes driver who is ineligible for series driver points
- (CC) denotes championship contender

#	Driver	Team	Make
0	Garrett Smithley (R)	JD Motorsports	Chevrolet
01	Ryan Preece (R)	JD Motorsports	Chevrolet
1	Elliott Sadler (CC)	JR Motorsports	Chevrolet
2	Austin Dillon (i)	Richard Childress Racing	Chevrolet
3	Ty Dillon	Richard Childress Racing	Chevrolet
4	Ross Chastain	JD Motorsports	Chevrolet
5	Cole Custer (i)	JR Motorsports	Chevrolet
6	Bubba Wallace	Roush Fenway Racing	Ford
07	Ray Black Jr. (R)	SS-Green Light Racing	Chevrolet
7	Justin Allgaier (CC)	JR Motorsports	Chevrolet
10	Matt DiBenedetto (i)	TriStar Motorsports	Toyota
11	Blake Koch	Kaulig Racing	Chevrolet
13	Brandon Hightower	MBM Motorsports	Dodge
14	Cole Whitt (i)	TriStar Motorsports	Toyota
15	Travis Kvapil (i)	Rick Ware Racing	Ford
16	Ryan Reed	Roush Fenway Racing	Ford
18	Matt Tifft (i)	Joe Gibbs Racing	Toyota
19	Daniel Suárez (CC)	Joe Gibbs Racing	Toyota
20	Erik Jones (R) (CC)	Joe Gibbs Racing	Toyota
22	Ryan Blaney (i)	Team Penske	Ford
24	Corey LaJoie	JGL Racing	Toyota
25	Josh Reaume	Rick Ware Racing	Chevrolet
28	Dakoda Armstrong	JGL Racing	Toyota
33	Brandon Jones (R)	Richard Childress Racing	Chevrolet
39	Ryan Sieg	RSS Racing	Chevrolet
40	Timmy Hill	MBM Motorsports	Toyota
42	Kyle Larson (i)	Chip Ganassi Racing	Chevrolet
44	J. J. Yeley	TriStar Motorsports	Toyota
46	Jordan Anderson	Precision Performance Motorsports	Chevrolet
48	Brennan Poole (R)	Chip Ganassi Racing	Chevrolet
51	Jeremy Clements	Jeremy Clements Racing	Chevrolet
52	Joey Gase	Jimmy Means Racing	Chevrolet
62	Brendan Gaughan	Richard Childress Racing	Chevrolet
70	Dexter Stacey	Derrike Cope Racing with JP Motorsports	Chevrolet
74	Mike Harmon	Mike Harmon Racing	Dodge
77	Ryan Ellis	Obaika Racing	Chevrolet
78	B. J. McLeod (R)	B. J. McLeod Motorsports	Ford
86	Brandon Brown (i)	Brandonbilt Motorsports	Chevrolet
88	Alex Bowman	JR Motorsports	Chevrolet
89	Morgan Shepherd	Shepherd Racing Ventures	Chevrolet
90	Mario Gosselin	King Autosport	Chevrolet
93	David Starr	RSS Racing	Chevrolet
97	Josh Bilicki	Obaika Racing	Chevrolet
98	Aric Almirola (i)	Biagi-DenBeste Racing	Ford
99	Jeff Green	B. J. McLeod Motorsports	Ford
Official Entry List

== Qualifying ==
Daniel Suárez won the pole with a time of 31.779 and a speed of 169.924 mph.

Grid	No.	Driver	Team	Manufacturer	Time	Speed
1	19	Daniel Suárez (CC)	Joe Gibbs Racing	Toyota	31.779	169.924
2	1	Elliott Sadler (CC)	JR Motorsports	Chevrolet	31.812	169.747
3	20	Erik Jones (R) (CC)	Joe Gibbs Racing	Toyota	31.850	169.545
4	22	Ryan Blaney (i)	Team Penske	Ford	32.031	168.587
5	2	Austin Dillon (i)	Richard Childress Racing	Chevrolet	32.039	168.545
6	7	Justin Allgaier (CC)	JR Motorsports	Chevrolet	32.120	168.120
7	42	Kyle Larson (i)	Chip Ganassi Racing	Chevrolet	32.127	168.083
8	88	Alex Bowman	JR Motorsports	Chevrolet	32.270	167.338
9	6	Bubba Wallace	Roush Fenway Racing	Ford	32.284	167.266
10	33	Brandon Jones (R)	Richard Childress Racing	Chevrolet	32.330	167.028
11	3	Ty Dillon	Richard Childress Racing	Chevrolet	32.337	166.991
12	11	Blake Koch	Kaulig Racing	Chevrolet	32.514	166.082
13	16	Ryan Reed	Roush Fenway Racing	Ford	32.311	167.126
14	62	Brendan Gaughan	Richard Childress Racing	Chevrolet	32.324	167.059
15	98	Aric Almirola (i)	Biagi-DenBeste Racing	Ford	32.386	166.739
16	14	Cole Whitt (i)	TriStar Motorsports	Toyota	32.465	166.333
17	48	Brennan Poole (R)	Chip Ganassi Racing	Chevrolet	32.472	166.297
18	5	Cole Custer	JR Motorsports	Chevrolet	32.528	166.011
19	44	J. J. Yeley	TriStar Motorsports	Toyota	32.537	165.965
20	4	Ross Chastain	JD Motorsports	Chevrolet	32.635	165.467
21	24	Corey LaJoie	JGL Racing	Toyota	32.752	164.875
22	46	Jordan Anderson (i)	Precision Performance Motorsports	Chevrolet	32.761	164.830
23	39	Ryan Sieg	RSS Racing	Chevrolet	32.763	164.820
24	10	Matt DiBenedetto (i)	TriStar Motorsports	Toyota	32.948	163.895
25	28	Dakoda Armstrong	JGL Racing	Toyota	32.952	163.875
26	01	Ryan Preece (R)	JD Motorsports	Chevrolet	32.960	163.835
27	51	Jeremy Clements	Jeremy Clements Racing	Chevrolet	33.186	162.719
28	0	Garrett Smithley (R)	JD Motorsports	Chevrolet	33.267	162.323
29	78	B. J. McLeod (R)	B. J. McLeod Motorsports	Ford	33.334	161.997
30	07	Ray Black Jr. (R)	SS-Green Light Racing	Chevrolet	33.392	161.715
31	86	Brandon Brown (i)	Brandonbilt Motorsports	Chevrolet	33.433	161.517
32	40	Timmy Hill (i)	MBM Motorsports	Toyota	33.471	161.334
33	52	Joey Gase	Jimmy Means Racing	Chevrolet	33.547	160.968
34	13	Brandon Hightower*	MBM Motorsports	Dodge	33.694	160.266
35	15	Travis Kvapil (i)*	Rick Ware Racing	Ford	33.707	160.204
36	90	Mario Gosselin*	King Autosport	Chevrolet	33.726	160.114
37	97	Josh Bilicki*	Obaika Racing	Chevrolet	33.951	159.053
38	25	Josh Reaume*	Rick Ware Racing	Chevrolet	34.026	158.702
39	18	Matt Tifft (i)*	Joe Gibbs Racing	Toyota	—	—
40	99	Jeff Green**	B. J. McLeod Motorsports	Ford	33.743	160.033
Failed to Qualify, Withdrew, or Driver Changes
41	93	David Starr	RSS Racing	Chevrolet	33.716	160.161
42	89	Morgan Shepherd	Shepherd Racing Ventures	Chevrolet	33.861	159.476
43	74	Mike Harmon	Mike Harmon Racing	Dodge	34.099	158.362
44	70	Dexter Stacey	Derrike Cope Racing	Chevrolet	34.191	157.936
45	77	Ryan Ellis	Obaika Racing	Chevrolet	34.276	157.545
Official Starting Grid

* – Qualified via owners points.

** – Qualified via past champions.

== Race ==
Pole sitter Daniel Suárez led the first lap of the race. The first caution did not take long as it came out on lap 4 when Brandon Hightower spun in turn 1. The race restarted on lap 8 of the race. On lap 23, Kyle Larson took the lead from Suárez. On lap 24, the second caution flew when Ryan Reed spun in turn 2. Kyle Larson won the race off of pit road and he led the field back to the restart on lap 33. Justin Allgaier was the new leader for the Championship. But Suárez passed Allgaier and eventually on lap 36, Suárez took the lead. Soon green flag pitstops began on lap 78. On lap 80, Daniel Suárez went on pit road handing the lead to Justin Allgaier. Allgaier pitted on lap 81 giving the lead to Ryan Sieg. Sieg eventually pitted and Kyle Larson was the new leader after everything cycled through. On lap 89, the third caution flew for oil on the track. The race restarted on lap 96. On the restart, Ty Dillon took the lead from Kyle Larson. On lap 100, Daniel Suárez took the lead. On lap 114, Ty Dillon took the lead back. On lap 125, the 4th caution flew when Brennan Poole spun off of turn 2. During the green flag run, Erik Jones brushed the wall with the front of his car having a hole in it and he got his car taped up for the restart. Suárez won the race off of pit road and he led the field to the restart on lap 132. On lap 137, the 5th caution flew for a 3 car crash on the backstretch. It started when Ryan Reed had a flat right rear tire after he brushed the wall in turns 3 and 4 and he ended up spinning down the backstretch. Behind Reed, Jeremy Clements attempted to get slowed down but was run into from behind by Jordan Anderson giving both cars heavy damage and catching Anderson's car on fire. The red flag was displayed for a short bit to clean up the mess. Aric Almirola did not pit and he led the field to the restart on lap 144. On the restart, Suárez immeadietly passed him for the lead. Eventually, the top 4 had all four Championship contenders in it and all four broke away from the pack.

=== Final laps ===
With 49 laps to go, Justin Allgaier took the lead from Suárez. While he took the lead, Elliott Sadler hit the turn 2 wall which dropped him back one spot. With 44 to go, Erik Jones took the lead. With 42 to go, the 6th caution flew for debris. Daniel Suárez won the race off of pit road but Aric Almirola and Ryan Blaney did not pit and Almirola led the field to the restart with 37 to go. Suárez immeadietly passed Almirola for the lead. Soon Suárez had built a sizeable lead over Erik Jones and Justin Allgaier but Jones reeled in Suárez with around 16 to go and was all over his rear bumper. But Jones hit the wall with 15 to go causing him to lose momentum. He closed in on Suárez again but hit the wall again two laps later. Jones was closing in on Suárez again when the 7th and final caution flew with 10 laps to go when Ray Black Jr. spun off of turn 4. This put pressure on crews to make the perfect stop for their driver. Everyone took four tires but Sadler's team took two tires and they won the race off of pit road putting them in front of the Championship 4. Allgaier's crew had a mess up as the jackman slipped going to the left side of the car which lost Allgaier two spots in the process. Cole Whitt stayed out and he led to the field to the restart with 3 laps to go. He quickly stacked up the field including Allgaier and Jones who were behind Whitt and Sadler took the lead. Suárez immeadietly went to Sadler's outside and Suárez was the new leader with 3 laps to go. Sadler tried to catch Suárez but couldn't and Daniel Suárez won the race and the NASCAR Xfinity Series Championship. Behind them, Alex Bowman crashed on the front stretch after contact with Bubba Wallace. Suárez became the first Mexican born driver to win a NASCAR Championship in the top 3 Series of Trucks, Xfinity, and Cup. This would be his first and only Championship. Ty Dillon, Elliott Sadler, Ryan Blaney, and Austin Dillon rounded out the top 5 while Justin Allgaier, Kyle Larson, Brendan Gaughan, Erik Jones, and Aric Almirola rounded out the top 10.

== Race results ==
Pos	Car	Driver	Team	Manufacturer	Laps Run	Laps Led	Status	Points
1	19	Daniel Suárez (CC)	Joe Gibbs Racing	Toyota	200	133	running	40
2	3	Ty Dillon	Richard Childress Racing	Chevrolet	200	17	running	40
3	1	Elliott Sadler (CC)	JR Motorsports	Chevrolet	200	1	running	38
4	22	Ryan Blaney (i)	Team Penske	Ford	200	0	running	0
5	2	Austin Dillon (i)	Richard Childress Racing	Chevrolet	200	0	running	0
6	7	Justin Allgaier (CC)	JR Motorsports	Chevrolet	200	6	running	35
7	42	Kyle Larson (i)	Chip Ganassi Racing	Chevrolet	200	23	running	0
8	62	Brendan Gaughan	Richard Childress Racing	Chevrolet	200	0	running	33
9	20	Erik Jones (R) (CC)	Joe Gibbs Racing	Toyota	200	3	running	32
10	98	Aric Almirola (i)	Biagi-DenBeste Racing	Ford	200	9	running	0
11	6	Bubba Wallace	Roush Fenway Racing	Ford	200	0	running	30
12	39	Ryan Sieg	RSS Racing	Chevrolet	200	1	running	30
13	44	J. J. Yeley	TriStar Motorsports	Toyota	200	0	running	28
14	88	Alex Bowman	JR Motorsports	Chevrolet	200	0	running	27
15	33	Brandon Jones (R)	Richard Childress Racing	Chevrolet	200	0	running	26
16	16	Ryan Reed	Roush Fenway Racing	Ford	200	0	running	25
17	5	Cole Custer (i)	JR Motorsports	Chevrolet	200	0	running	0
18	14	Cole Whitt (i)	TriStar Motorsports	Toyota	200	3	running	0
19	28	Dakoda Armstrong	JGL Racing	Toyota	199	0	running	22
20	11	Blake Koch	Kaulig Racing	Chevrolet	199	0	running	21
21	01	Ryan Preece (R)	JD Motorsports	Chevrolet	199	0	running	20
22	4	Ross Chastain	JD Motorsports	Chevrolet	199	0	running	19
23	86	Brandon Brown (i)	Brandonbilt Motorsports	Chevrolet	198	0	running	0
24	51	Jeremy Clements	Jeremy Clements Racing	Chevrolet	198	0	running	17
25	18	Matt Tifft (i)	Joe Gibbs Racing	Toyota	197	0	running	0
26	15	Travis Kvapil (i)	Rick Ware Racing	Ford	196	1	running	0
27	48	Brennan Poole (R)	Chip Ganassi Racing	Chevrolet	196	0	running	14
28	07	Ray Black Jr. (R)	SS-Green Light Racing	Chevrolet	195	0	running	13
29	0	Garrett Smithley (R)	JD Motorsports	Chevrolet	195	0	running	12
30	13	Brandon Hightower	MBM Motorsports	Dodge	195	0	running	11
31	78	B. J. McLeod (R)	B. J. McLeod Motorsports	Ford	195	0	running	10
32	99	Jeff Green	B. J. McLeod Motorsports	Ford	194	0	running	9
33	25	Josh Reaume	Rick Ware Racing	Chevrolet	193	0	running	8
34	97	Josh Bilicki	Obaika Racing	Chevrolet	189	0	running	7
35	24	Corey LaJoie	JGL Racing	Toyota	167	0	oil leak	6
36	46	Jordan Anderson (i)	Precision Performance Motorsports	Chevrolet	134	0	crash	0
37	52	Joey Gase	Jimmy Means Racing	Chevrolet	87	0	ignition	4
38	90	Mario Gosselin	King Autosport	Chevrolet	49	0	overheating	3
39	40	Timmy Hill (i)	MBM Motorsports	Toyota	43	3	brakes	0
40	10	Matt DiBenedetto (i)	TriStar Motorsports	Toyota	2	0	vibration	0
Official Race results

Previous race: 2016 Ticket Galaxy 200	NASCAR Xfinity Series; 2016 season	Next race: 2017 PowerShares QQQ 300
