= NASCAR Busch Series at Pikes Peak International Raceway =

NASCAR stock car race

ITT Industries & Goulds Pumps Salute to the Troops 250

NASCAR Busch Series
- Venue: Pikes Peak International Raceway
- Location: Fountain, Colorado, United States
- Corporate sponsor: ITT Industries; Goulds Pumps
- First race: 1998
- Last race: 2005
- Distance: 250 miles (402.336 km)
- Laps: 250
- Previous names: Lycos.com 250 (1998); NAPA Autocare 250 (1999-2001); NetZero 250 (2002); TrimSpa Dream Body 250 presented by Dodge (2003); Goulds Pumps / ITT Industries Salute to the Troops 250 (2004); ITT Industries & Goulds Pumps Salute to the Troops 250 (2005)
- Most wins (manufacturer): Chevrolet (5)

Circuit information
- Surface: Asphalt
- Length: 1.0 mi (1.6 km)
- Turns: 4

Stock car races in the now-NASCAR O'Reilly Auto Parts Series were held at Pikes Peak International Raceway, in Fountain, Colorado between 1998 to 2005, when the owners of PPIR, International Speedway Corporation, closed the facility. Following the closure of the track, the race was replaced the following season with the Goody's 250 at Martinsville Speedway, another ISC-owned track, only for it to be replaced with NAPA Auto Parts 200 in Circuit Gilles Villeneuve in Montreal, Canada in 2007.

== Past winners ==
Year	Date	Driver	Team	Manufacturer	Race Distance		Race Time	Average Speed (mph)	Report	Ref
Year	Date	Driver	Team	Manufacturer	Laps	Miles (km)	Race Time	Average Speed (mph)	Report	Ref
1998	June 14	Matt Kenseth	Reiser Enterprises	Chevrolet	250	250 (402.336)	2:25:52	102.834	Report	
1999	July 24	Andy Santerre	Innovative Motorsports	Chevrolet	250	250 (402.336)	2:23:19	104.663	Report	
2000	July 22	Jeff Green	ppc Racing	Chevrolet	250	250 (402.336)	2:06:40	118.421	Report	
2001	July 28	Jeff Purvis	Richard Childress Racing	Chevrolet	250	250 (402.336)	2:04:50	120.16	Report	
2002	July 27	Hank Parker Jr.	Welliver-Jesel Motorsports	Dodge	250	250 (402.336)	2:12:20	113.350	Report	
2003	July 26	Scott Wimmer	Bill Davis Racing	Chevrolet	250	250 (402.336)	2:17:43	108.919	Report	
2004	July 31	Greg Biffle	Roush Racing	Ford	250	250 (402.336)	2:19:57	107.181	Report	
2005	July 23	David Green	Brewco Motorsports	Ford	250	250 (402.336)	2:17:21	109.210	Report	
