= NASCAR O'Reilly Auto Parts Series at Homestead–Miami Speedway =

Annual NASCAR O'Reilly Auto Parts Series race at Homestead-Miami Speedway

O'Reilly Auto Parts 300

NASCAR O'Reilly Auto Parts Series
- Venue: Homestead–Miami Speedway
- Location: Homestead, Florida, United States
- Corporate sponsor: O'Reilly Auto Parts
- First race: 1995
- Distance: 300 miles (480 km)
- Laps: 200; Stages 1/2: 45 each Final stage: 110
- Previous names: Jiffy Lube Miami 300 (1995–1998); HotWheels.com 300 (1999); Miami 300 (2000); GNC Live Well 300 (2001); Ford 300 (2002–2011); Ford EcoBoost 300 (2012–2019); Hooters 250 (2020 I); Contender Boats 250 (2020 II–2021); Contender Boats 300 (2022–2023); Credit One NASCAR Amex Credit Card 300 (2024); Hard Rock Bet 300 (2025)
- Most wins (driver): Joe Nemechek (3)
- Most wins (team): Joe Gibbs Racing (6)
- Most wins (manufacturer): Chevrolet (16)

Circuit information
- Surface: Asphalt
- Length: 1.5 mi (2.4 km)
- Turns: 4

The O'Reilly Auto Parts 300 is a NASCAR O'Reilly Auto Parts Series race held at Homestead–Miami Speedway since the track's inauguration in 1995. For much of its history, it was the final race of the second national series' season with exception of one-off emergency races in 2020, a one-off change in 2021, and held in March in 2025.

Brandon Jones is the defending winner.

== History ==
The race at Homestead was added to the then-Busch Series calendar in 1995, and was immediately positioned as the final event of the series' season. Through the 2001 season, the Busch Series was the only one of NASCAR's three major series to end its season at the track. The NASCAR Craftsman Truck Series began racing at the track in 1996 with an early season date, while the NASCAR Cup Series placed the series on its 1999 schedule and gave it the penultimate race date on its schedule.

In 2002, NASCAR began having its season ending weekend at Homestead, with all three series crowning their respective champions at the end of the weekend. The 300 mile event was run on Saturday of that weekend, and carried sponsorship from Ford Motor Company until 2019.

In 2020, the race date was changed to early spring as part of a schedule realignment. Due to the COVID-19 pandemic, the race was moved to June and changed from a single 300-mile race to two races combined for a total distance of 501 miles, replacing a date at Iowa Speedway. Hooters assumed naming rights for the first race, while Contender Boats, a local boat manufacturer, sponsored the second, a Dash 4 Cash event. The Sunday race was originally named the 2020Census.gov 300 as the United States Census was going on at the time of the initially scheduled date.

For the 2021 season, the race was originally announced as reverting to its original 300-mile distance with Contender Boats returning as title sponsor, but it instead remained at 250 miles with 167 laps and the Contender Boats 250 race name.

In 2024, Credit One Bank became the title sponsor of the race and in 2025, the race was held in March and Hard Rock Bet became the title sponsor of the race, replacing Credit One Bank. The 2025 event would also be the first Dash 4 Cash event of the year.

On May 5, 2025, it was announced that Homestead would become the championship race in 2026, replacing Phoenix. Since O'Reilly Auto Parts took over the naming rights for the series, the race was dubbed as the O'Reilly Auto Parts 300.

== Past winners ==
Year	Date	No.	Driver	Team	Manufacturer	Race Distance		Race Time	Average Speed (mph)	Report	Ref
Year	Date	No.	Driver	Team	Manufacturer	Laps	Miles (km)	Race Time	Average Speed (mph)	Report	Ref
1995	November 5	32	Dale Jarrett	Dale Jarrett	Ford	200	300 (482.803)	3:16:28	92.229	Report	
1996	November 3	88	Kevin Lepage	Lepage Racing	Chevrolet	200	300 (482.803)	2:32:04	119.158	Report	
1997	November 9	87	Joe Nemechek*	NEMCO Motorsports	Chevrolet	200	300 (482.803)	2:39:26	112.9	Report	
1998	November 15	9	Jeff Burton	Roush Racing	Ford	200	300 (482.803)	2:18:53	129.605	Report	
1999	November 13	87	Joe Nemechek	NEMCO Motorsports	Chevrolet	200	300 (482.803)	2:24:28	124.596	Report	
2000	November 11	24	Jeff Gordon	JG Motorsports	Chevrolet	200	300 (482.803)	2:23:29	125.45	Report	
2001	November 10	87	Joe Nemechek	NEMCO Motorsports	Chevrolet	200	300 (482.803)	2:16:10	132.191	Report	
2002	November 16	23	Scott Wimmer	Bill Davis Racing	Pontiac	200	300 (482.803)	2:25:42	123.542	Report	
2003	November 15	38	Kasey Kahne	Akins Motorsports	Ford	200	300 (482.803)	2:28:18	121.376	Report	
2004	November 20	29	Kevin Harvick	Richard Childress Racing	Chevrolet	202*	303 (487.631)	2:45:22	110.482	Report	
2005*	November 19	39	Ryan Newman	Penske Racing	Dodge	200	300 (482.803)	2:24:41	124.41	Report	
2006	November 18	17	Matt Kenseth	Roush Racing	Ford	200	300 (482.803)	2:22:16	126.523	Report	
2007*	November 17	29	Jeff Burton	Richard Childress Racing	Chevrolet	200	300 (482.803)	2:39:59	112.512	Report	
2008	November 15	60	Carl Edwards	Roush Fenway Racing	Ford	200	300 (482.803)	2:33:24	117.34	Report	
2009	November 21	18	Kyle Busch	Joe Gibbs Racing	Toyota	200	300 (482.803)	2:21:49	126.924	Report	
2010	November 20	18	Kyle Busch	Joe Gibbs Racing	Toyota	200	300 (482.803)	2:42:32	110.747	Report	
2011	November 19	22	Brad Keselowski	Penske Racing	Dodge	200	300 (482.803)	2:30:47	119.377	Report	
2012	November 17	5	Regan Smith	JR Motorsports	Chevrolet	200	300 (482.803)	2:19:44	128.817	Report	
2013	November 16	48	Brad Keselowski	Penske Racing	Ford	200	300 (482.803)	2:45:06	109.025	Report	
2014*	November 15	20	Matt Kenseth	Joe Gibbs Racing	Toyota	206*	309 (497.287)	2:40:36	115.442	Report	
2015	November 21	42	Kyle Larson	HScott Motorsports	Chevrolet	200	300 (482.803)	2:20:20	128.266	Report	
2016	November 19	19	Daniel Suárez	Joe Gibbs Racing	Toyota	200	300 (482.803)	2:34:34	116.455	Report	
2017	November 18	00	Cole Custer	Stewart–Haas Racing	Ford	200	300 (482.803)	2:12:13	136.14	Report	
2018	November 17	9	Tyler Reddick	JR Motorsports	Chevrolet	200	300 (482.803)	2:08:06	140.515	Report	
2019	November 16	2	Tyler Reddick	Richard Childress Racing	Chevrolet	200	300 (482.803)	2:31:49	118.564	Report	
2020	June 13*	20	Harrison Burton	Joe Gibbs Racing	Toyota	167	250.5 (403.140)	2:06:34	118.752	Report	
2020	June 14*	98	Chase Briscoe	Stewart–Haas Racing	Ford	177*	265.5 (427.280)	2:15:52	117.247	Report	
2021	February 27*	2	Myatt Snider	Richard Childress Racing	Chevrolet	179*	268.5 (432.108)	2:30:59	103.72	Report	
2022	October 22	9	Noah Gragson	JR Motorsports	Chevrolet	200	300 (482.803)	2:24:08	124.884	Report	
2023	October 21	1	Sam Mayer	JR Motorsports	Chevrolet	200	300 (482.803)	2:34:29	116.517	Report	
2024	October 26	21	Austin Hill	Richard Childress Racing	Chevrolet	200	300 (482.803)	2:20:23	128.220	Report	
2025	March 22	7	Justin Allgaier	JR Motorsports	Chevrolet	201*	301.5 (485.217)	2:32:56	118.287	Report	
2026	November 7	20	Brandon Jones	Joe Gibbs Racing	Toyota	200	300 (482.803)	2:28:12	121.457	Report	
2027	November 13									Report	

=== Notes ===
- 2016–2019, 2026: Races were held as the NASCAR O'Reilly Auto Parts Series Championship Race.
- 2004, 2014, 2020 II, 2021, & 2025: Races extended due to NASCAR overtime.
- 2020: Race postponed from March 21 due to COVID-19 pandemic; event format changed to twin 250-mile races due to Iowa Speedway's cancellation.
- 2021: Race moved from February 20 due to scheduling changes triggered by Auto Club Speedway's cancellation.

=== Track configuration notes ===
- 1995–1996: Rectangular oval
- 1997–2002: True oval; low banking
- 2003–present: True oval; steep, progressive banking

=== Multiple winners (drivers) ===
# Wins	Driver	Years won
3	Joe Nemechek	1997, 1999, 2001
2	Jeff Burton	1998, 2007
2	Kyle Busch	2009, 2010
2	Brad Keselowski	2011, 2013
2	Matt Kenseth	2006, 2014
2	Tyler Reddick	2018, 2019

=== Multiple winners (teams) ===
# Wins	Team	Years won
6	Joe Gibbs Racing	2009, 2010, 2014, 2016, 2020 (1 of 2), 2026
5	Richard Childress Racing	2004, 2007, 2019, 2021, 2024
5	JR Motorsports	2012, 2018, 2022, 2023, 2025
3	NEMCO Motorsports	1997, 1999, 2001
3	Roush Fenway Racing	1998, 2006, 2008
3	Penske Racing	2005, 2011, 2013
2	Stewart–Haas Racing	2017, 2020 (1 of 2)

=== Manufacturer wins ===
# Wins	Make	Years won
16	(United States) Chevrolet	1996, 1997, 1999–2001, 2004, 2007, 2012, 2015, 2018, 2019, 2021–2025
8	(United States) Ford	1995, 1998, 2003, 2006, 2008, 2013, 2017, 2020 (1 of 2)
6	(Japan) Toyota	2009, 2010, 2014, 2016, 2020 (1 of 2), 2026
2	(United States) Dodge	2005, 2011
1	(United States) Pontiac	2002

Previous race: National Debt Relief 250	NASCAR O'Reilly Auto Parts Series; O'Reilly Auto Parts 300	Next race: United Rentals 300
