= List of NASCAR Manufacturers' champions =

Car manufacturers' award scheme

The NASCAR Manufacturers' Championship is awarded by NASCAR to the most successful manufacturer over a season, as determined by a points system based on race results. The Manufacturers' Championship was first awarded in 1952, to Hudson.

Different car make/engine combinations are considered to be different manufacturers for the purposes of the Championship. Up to the 2013 season, the Manufacturers' Championship points were calculated by adding points scored in each race by the highest finishing driver for that manufacturer. The winning manufacturer earns nine points, while the second-highest finishing manufacturer earns six points. The third-highest manufacturer earns four points, and the fourth-highest three points. For the 2014 season, NASCAR made the decision to mirror the points structure of the Owners' Championships. Under this system, the highest finishing driver for each manufacturer earns the same number of points the representing team earned during the race, including bonus points for wins and laps led.

== History ==
Dozens of vehicle manufacturers have had cars in one of the three top NASCAR series since the inception of the Manufacturers' Championship title, only nine have won a title. To date, all but Toyota have been American-owned companies.

=== Championship winners (totals) ===
Manufacturer	Total Wins	Cup Wins	NOAPS Wins	Truck Wins
Chevrolet	84	44	28	12
Ford	24	17	4	3
Toyota	22	4	4	14
Buick	5	2	3	–
Dodge	5	2	0	3
Pontiac	5	1	4	–
Hudson	3	3	–	–
Oldsmobile	3	1	2	–
Plymouth	1	1	–	–
Chrysler	0	0	–	–
Mercury	0	0	0	–

Active in 2026

== Manufacturer representation ==
In the beginning, teams received little support from the car companies themselves, but by the mid-1960s, teams began creating partnerships with American manufacturers to provide factory support. Chrysler, Ford and General Motors were the primary, if not only, competitors for much of NASCAR's history. Plymouth achieved some success during the 1960s, but abandoned the sport in 1977. In the next decade, Ford's Mercury brand left, as did Chrysler's remaining brand in Dodge. General Motors had been using four different brands in NASCAR up to 1991, but within three years, Buick and Oldsmobile were no longer represented on the grid. Pontiac survived until 2004, leaving only Chevrolet as the lone General Motors division. In 2007 when Japanese manufacturer Toyota joined, it became the first new manufacturer since 1971. Chrysler's Dodge brand returned after a 15-year hiatus in 2001, but departed after 2012, leaving just Chevrolet, Ford and Toyota.

Manufacturer	Make	Model	Cup years	NOAPS Years	Truck years
Alfa Romeo (Italy)	Alfa Romeo	Giulietta	1962		
American Motors (United States)	Nash	Ambassador	1949-1956		
American Motors (United States)	Nash	Rambler	1956		
American Motors (United States)	Nash	Unknown model	1961		
American Motors (United States)	Rambler	Unknown model	1957		
American Motors (United States)	Hudson	Hornet	1949-1956		
American Motors (United States)	AMC	Matador	1971–1978		
American Motors (United States)	AMC	Javelin	1971		
Aston Martin (United Kingdom)	Aston Martin	Unknown model	1953		
Austin-Healey (United Kingdom)	Austin-Healey	A70 Hereford	1951		
Austin-Healey (United Kingdom)	Austin-Healey	Unknown model	1954, 1958		
Austin-Healey (United Kingdom)	Austin-Healey	Sprite	1961–1962		
Chrysler (United States)	DeSoto	Unknown model	1952, 1959		
Chrysler (United States)	Dodge	Unknown model	1951-1952		
Chrysler (United States)	Dodge	Coronet	1953–1957, 1965–1968		
Chrysler (United States)	Dodge	440	1964		
Chrysler (United States)	Dodge	Charger/Charger Daytona	1966–1977, 2005–2007	2005–2007	
Chrysler (United States)	Dodge	Magnum	1978–1980		
Chrysler (United States)	Dodge	Mirada	1981–1984		
Chrysler (United States)	Dodge	Ram			2000–2013, 2026
Chrysler (United States)	Dodge	Intrepid	2001–2004	2003–2004	
Chrysler (United States)	Dodge	Avenger	2007 (COT)		
Chrysler (United States)	Dodge	Charger R/T	2008–2012	2008–2010	
Chrysler (United States)	Dodge	Challenger		2010-2018	
Chrysler (United States)	Chrysler	Unknown model	1949-1953		
Chrysler (United States)	Chrysler	300	1954–1956		
Chrysler (United States)	Chrysler	Imperial	1981–1985		
Chrysler (United States)	Plymouth	Belvedere	1959–1967		
Chrysler (United States)	Plymouth	Road Runner/Superbird	1968–1977		
Chrysler (United States)	Plymouth	Savoy	1949-		
Chrysler (United States)	Plymouth	Valiant	1960		
Citroën (France)	Citroën	ID 19	1958		
Ford Motor Company (United States)	Ford	F-Series			2000–present
Ford Motor Company (United States)	Ford	Fairlane	1955–1959, 1966–1967		
Ford Motor Company (United States)	Ford	Fusion	2006–2018	2006–2010	
Ford Motor Company (United States)	Ford	Galaxie	1960–1966		
Ford Motor Company (United States)	Ford	Mustang	1971, 2019–present	2010–present	
Ford Motor Company (United States)	Ford	Taurus	1998–2005	1998–2005	
Ford Motor Company (United States)	Ford	Torino/Torino Talladega	1968–1977		
Ford Motor Company (United States)	Ford	Thunderbird	1959–1961, 1977–1997		
Ford Motor Company (United States)	Ford	Unknown model	1949-1954		
Ford Motor Company (United States)	Meteor (Canada)	Unknown model	1953		
Ford Motor Company (United States)	Mercury	Monterey	1949–1962		
Ford Motor Company (United States)	Mercury	Marauder	1963–1966		
Ford Motor Company (United States)	Mercury	Comet/Cyclone	1966–1967		
Ford Motor Company (United States)	Mercury	Cyclone/Montego	1968–1979		
Ford Motor Company (United States)	Mercury	Cougar	1970s-1980		
Ford Motor Company (United States)	Lincoln	Unknown model	1949–1955, 1957		
Ford Motor Company (United States)	Edsel	Unknown model	1959		
General Motors (United States)	Buick	Regal	1981–1985, 1988–1992		
General Motors (United States)	Buick	Century	1976–1980		
General Motors (United States)	Buick	Gran Sport	1970s		
General Motors (United States)	Buick	LeSabre	1986–1987		
General Motors (United States)	Buick	Somerset	1980s		
General Motors (United States)	Buick	Unknown model	1949-1958		
General Motors (United States)	Cadillac	Unknown model	1949–1952, 1954-1955		
General Motors (United States)	Chevrolet	Unknown model	1950-		
General Motors (United States)	Chevrolet	Bel Air	1955–1958		
General Motors (United States)	Chevrolet	Chevelle/Malibu	1964–1982		
General Motors (United States)	Chevrolet	Chevelle Laguna	1973–1977		
General Motors (United States)	Chevrolet	Corvair	1961		
General Motors (United States)	Chevrolet	Corvette (C1)	1960-1963		
General Motors (United States)	Chevrolet	Impala	1979–1980, 2010–2012	2009–2012	
General Motors (United States)	Chevrolet	Impala SS (COT)	2007–2009		
General Motors (United States)	Chevrolet	Lumina	1989–1994		
General Motors (United States)	Chevrolet	Monte Carlo/SS	1971–1988, 1995–2007	1999–2008	
General Motors (United States)	Chevrolet	Silverado			2000–present
General Motors (United States)	Chevrolet	SS	2013–2017		
General Motors (United States)	Chevrolet	Camaro	1971	2013–present	
General Motors (United States)	Chevrolet	Camaro ZL1	2018–present		
General Motors (United States)	Chevrolet	Beretta	1980s		
General Motors (United States)	Oldsmobile	88	1949–1960		
General Motors (United States)	Oldsmobile	Cutlass/Cutlass Supreme/442	1960s–1994		
General Motors (United States)	Oldsmobile	Delta 88	1986–1987		
General Motors (United States)	Pontiac	Unknown model	1950-1951		
General Motors (United States)	Pontiac	Chieftain	1956-1958		
General Motors (United States)	Pontiac	Catalina	1959–1963		
General Motors (United States)	Pontiac	Firebird	1970-1971		
General Motors (United States)	Pontiac	Grand Prix	1981–2004	1983–2004	
General Motors (United States)	Pontiac	Le Mans	1970s		
General Motors (United States)	Pontiac	Tempest	1960s		
General Motors (United States)	Pontiac	GTO	1960s		
Goliath-Werke Borgward & Co. (Germany)	Goliath	1100	1958		
Jaguar (United Kingdom)	Jaguar	XK120	1953–1954, 1956		
Kaiser-Frazer (United States)	Henry	J	1949–1954		
MG (United Kingdom)	MG	T-Type	1954		
MG (United Kingdom)	MG	MGA	1960–1963		
Morgan Motor Company (United Kingdom)	Morgan	Morgan +4	1954		
Packard (United States)	Packard	Unknown model	1950–1956		
Porsche (Germany)	Porsche	356	1953–1954		
Renault (France)	Renault	Unknown model	1958		
Studebaker (United States)	Studebaker	Unknown model	1949–1959, 1961-1962		
Toyota (Japan)	Toyota	Camry	2007–present	2007–2018	
Toyota (Japan)	Toyota	Supra		2019–present	
Toyota (Japan)	Toyota	Tundra			2004–present
Leyland Motors (United Kingdom)	Triumph	Unknown model	1960		
Tucker (United States)	Tucker	Sedan	1950		
Volkswagen (Germany)	Volkswagen	Beetle	1953		
Willys (United States)	Willys	Unknown model	1952–1954		

== Cup Series ==
=== Results by season ===
Season	Manufacturer	Wins	Notes
1952	Hudson	27	
1953	Hudson	22	
1954	Hudson	17	
1955	Oldsmobile	10	Chrysler had 27 wins, but lost the points title
1956	Ford	14	Chrysler had 22 wins, but lost the points title
1957	Ford	26	
1958	Chevrolet	25	
1959	Chevrolet	16	Ford also had 16 wins, but lost the points title
1960	Chevrolet	13	Ford had 15 wins, but lost the points title
1961	Chevrolet	11	Pontiac had 30 wins, but lost the points title
1962	Pontiac	22	Pontiac's only manufacturers' title
1963	Ford	23	
1964	Ford	30	
1965	Ford	48	Ford ran unopposed most of the season due to a boycott by Chrysler Corporation
1966	Ford	10	Plymouth had 31 wins and Dodge had 18; mostly due to running season unopposed since Ford dropped out mid season, both lost the points title
1967	Ford	10	Plymouth had 31 wins, but lost the points title
1968	Ford	21	
1969	Ford	26	
1970	Dodge	17	Plymouth and Dodge cars ran unopposed most of season after Ford dropped out, had 21 wins, but lost the points title
1971	Plymouth	22	
1972	Chevrolet	10	
1973	Chevrolet	7	Mercury had 11 wins, but lost the points title
1974	Chevrolet	12	
1975	Dodge	14	Dodge's second and last manufacturers' title
1976	Chevrolet	13	
1977	Chevrolet	21	
1978	Chevrolet	10	Oldsmobile had 11 wins, but lost the points title
1979	Chevrolet	18	
1980	Chevrolet	22	
1981	Buick	22	
1982	Buick	25	
1983	Chevrolet	15	
1984	Chevrolet	21	
1985	Chevrolet	14	Ford also had 14 wins, but lost the points title
1986	Chevrolet	18	
1987	Chevrolet	15	
1988	Chevrolet	8	Ford had 9 wins, but lost the points title
1989	Chevrolet	13	
1990	Chevrolet	13	
1991	Chevrolet	11	
1992	Ford	16	Ford's first manufacturers' title in 23 seasons
1993	Chevrolet	9	Pontiac had 11 wins, but lost the points title
1994	Ford	20	
1995	Chevrolet	21	
1996	Chevrolet	17	
1997	Ford	19	
1998	Chevrolet	16	
1999	Ford	13	
2000	Ford	14	
2001	Chevrolet	16	
2002	Ford	14	
2003	Chevrolet	19	
2004	Chevrolet	22	
2005	Chevrolet	17	
2006	Chevrolet	23	
2007	Chevrolet	26	Modern Era record for wins in a season
2008	Chevrolet	11	
2009	Chevrolet	11	
2010	Chevrolet	18	Won championship after the 2010 Pepsi Max 400
2011	Chevrolet	18	
2012	Chevrolet	15	The Team Penske No. 2 Dodge driven by Brad Keselowski won the drivers' championship
2013	Chevrolet	17	
2014	Chevrolet	20	
2015	Chevrolet	15	
2016	Toyota	16	Chevrolet's 13-season streak ended as Toyota won its first manufacturers' title
2017	Toyota	16	
2018	Ford	19	Ford's first manufacturers' title in 16 seasons
2019	Toyota	19	Won championship after the 2019 Bluegreen Vacations 500
2020	Ford	18	Won championship after the 2020 Xfinity 500
2021	Chevrolet	19	Won championship after the 2021 Xfinity 500
2022	Chevrolet	19	Won championship after the 2022 Xfinity 500
2023	Chevrolet	18	Won championship after the 2023 Xfinity 500
2024	Chevrolet	15	Won championship after the 2024 Xfinity 500
2025	Chevrolet	15	
2026	Toyota	18	Toyota's first championship since 2019. Won championship after the 2026 Freeway Insurance 500

== O'Reilly Auto Parts Series ==
=== Results by season ===
Season	Manufacturer	Wins	Notes
1982	Pontiac	21	
1983	Oldsmobile	13	Pontiac had 18 wins, but lost the points title
1984	Pontiac	18	
1985	Pontiac	19	
1986	Pontiac	20	
1987	Chevrolet	9	
1988	Buick	18	
1989	Buick	15	
1990	Buick	11	
1991	Oldsmobile	10	
1992	Chevrolet	9	Oldsmobile had 10 wins, but lost the points title
1993	Chevrolet	11	
1994	Chevrolet	20	
1995	Ford	14	First win for a non-GM manufacturer
1996	Chevrolet	18	
1997	Chevrolet	20	
1998	Chevrolet	23	
1999	Chevrolet	24	
2000	Chevrolet	23	
2001	Chevrolet	19	
2002	Ford	16	
2003	Chevrolet	19	
2004	Chevrolet	21	
2005	Chevrolet	14	
2006	Chevrolet	22	
2007	Chevrolet	22	
2008	Toyota	20	
2009	Toyota	15	
2010	Toyota	15	
2011	Ford	13	
2012	Chevrolet	13	
2013	Ford	14	Toyota also had 14 wins, but lost the points title
2014	Chevrolet	15	
2015	Chevrolet	11	Ford and Toyota also had 11 wins, but lost the points title
2016	Toyota	19	
2017	Chevrolet	12	Toyota also had 12 wins, but lost the points title
2018	Chevrolet	15	
2019	Chevrolet	10	Toyota had 13 wins, but lost the points title
2020	Chevrolet	10	Ford had 15 wins, but lost the points title
2021	Chevrolet	16	
2022	Chevrolet	24	
2023	Chevrolet	17	
2024	Chevrolet	18	
2025	Chevrolet	26	
2026	Chevrolet	29	

== Truck Series ==
=== Results by season ===
Season	Manufacturer	Wins	Notes
1995	Chevrolet	16	
1996	Chevrolet	18	
1997	Chevrolet	16	
1998	Chevrolet	15	
1999	Ford	12	
2000	Ford	12	
2001	Dodge	15	
2002	Chevrolet	11	
2003	Dodge	13	
2004	Dodge	11	Toyota enters the series
2005	Chevrolet	9	
2006	Toyota	12	First win by an international manufacturer in any series
2007	Toyota	13	
2008	Toyota	13	
2009	Toyota	14	
2010	Toyota	15	
2011	Chevrolet	15	
2012	Chevrolet	12	
2013	Toyota	14	
2014	Toyota	18	
2015	Toyota	14	
2016	Toyota	14	
2017	Toyota	12	
2018	Chevrolet	11	
2019	Toyota	12	
2020	Chevrolet	10	
2021	Toyota	15	
2022	Toyota	12	
2023	Chevrolet	14	
2024	Chevrolet	12	
2025	Toyota	14	
2026	Ford	11	
