= Stafford 150 =

NASCAR K&N Pro Series East
- Venue: Stafford Motor Speedway
- Location: Stafford Springs, Connecticut; United States
- Corporate sponsor: Stafford
- First race: 1987–2008 (Busch North Series); 2016 (K&N Pro Series East)
- Last race: 2016
- Distance: 75 miles (120.721 km)
- Laps: 150
- Previous names: Busch / Stafford 125 (1987); Carquest 150 (1991–2003); Aubuchon Hardware 150 (2004–2005); TSI Harley Davidson 150 (2006); 17th Annual TSI Harley Davidson 150 (2007); Carquest Fall Final 150 (2008); Stafford 150 (2016) --- Former second races Stafford 150 (1997); NASCAR 150 (1998–2000, 2002); ASB / NASCAR 150 (2001); New England Dodge Dealers 150 (2003); TSI Harley Davidson 150 (2005) --- Former third races Carquest Fall Final (2001–2003)

Circuit information
- Surface: Pavement
- Length: 0.5 mi (0.80 km)
- Turns: 4

The Stafford 150 was a NASCAR K&N Pro Series East race held annually at Stafford Motor Speedway.

== History ==
The race was scheduled to be 150 laps, 75 mi (121 km), but was extended to 153 laps, 79 mi (127 km) due to NASCAR overtime.

== Past winners ==
Year	Date	Driver	Team	Manufacturer	Race distance		Race time	Average speed (mph)
Year	Date	Driver	Team	Manufacturer	Laps	Miles	Race time	Average speed (mph)
1987	July 14	Tommy Houston	Steve Arndt	Buick	82*	41 (65.983)	–	–
1988 – 1990	Not held							
1991	June 28	Mike Stefanik	Wright Pearson Racing	Pontiac	150	75 (120.721)	1:22:02	49.022
1992	Not held							
1993	June 18	Mike McLaughlin	Greci Motorsports	Oldsmobile	150	75 (120.721)	1:06:56	67.003
1994	July 29	Keith Lamell	Lamell Lumber Racing	Buick (2)	164*	82 (131.966)	1:18:30	57.325
1995	September 8	Tom Bolles	Edward Bolles	Chevrolet	157*	78.5 (126.333)	1:19:36	59.171
1996	July 26	Andy Santerre	Andy Santerre Racing	Chevrolet	150	75 (120.721)	1:25:26	52.673
1997	June 6	Jerry Marquis	O'Connor Racing	Chevrolet	150	75 (120.721)	1:10:13	64.087
1997	July 25	Andy Santerre (2)	Andy Santerre Racing (2)	Chevrolet	150	75 (120.721)	1:14:11	60.661
1998	July 3	Rick Fuller	Kistner Motorsports	Chevrolet	162*	81 (130.356)	1:13:49	65.839
1998	July 24	Mike Stefanik (2)	Greci Motorsports (2)	Chevrolet	152*	76 (122.310)	1:01:04	74.673
1999	July 2	Brad Leighton	Grizco Racing	Chevrolet	154*	77 (123.919)	1:34:13	49.036
1999	July 23	Dennis Demers	Dennis Demers Racing	Chevrolet	150	75 (120.721)	1:17:07	58.353
2000	June 30	Ted Christopher	Lestorti Racing	Chevrolet	150	75 (120.721)	1:16:14	59.029
2000	July 28	Mike Johnson	Albert Johnson	Ford	155*	77.5 (124.724)	1:15:54	61.625
2001	June 22	Kelly Moore	Richard Moore Racing	Chevrolet	150	75 (120.721)	1:25:56	52.376
2001	July 27	Martin Truex Jr.	SeaWatch Racing	Chevrolet	150	75 (120.721)	1:27:02	51.704
2001	September 30	Brad Leighton (2)	Grizco Racing (2)	Chevrolet	150	75 (120.721)	0:58:24	75.758
2002	June 21	Kelly Moore (2)	Richard Moore Racing (2)	Chevrolet	150	75 (120.721)	1:06:53	69.353
2002	July 26	Dale Shaw		Chevrolet	153*	76.5 (123.114)	1:10:22	65.23
2002	September 29	Mike Johnson (2)	Albert Johnson (2)	Ford (2)	150	75 (120.721)	1:21:35	55.158
2003	May 9	Martin Truex Jr. (2)	SeaWatch Racing (2)	Chevrolet	150	75 (120.721)	1:12:09	62.37
2003	June 20	Tom Carey Jr.	Doyle Racing	Chevrolet	150	75 (120.721)	1:09:03	65.017
2003	October 5	Mike Johnson (3)	Albert Johnson (3)	Ford (3)	150	75 (120.721)	1:18:54	56.998
2004	June 18	Kelly Moore (3)	Richard Moore Racing (3)	Chevrolet	150	75 (120.721)	0:59:35	75.524
2005	June 17	Matt Kobyluck	Matt Kobyluck Racing	Chevrolet	150	75 (120.721)	1:00:26	74.462
2005	August 10	Ryan Moore	Richard Moore Racing (3)	Chevrolet	150	75 (120.721)	1:09:21	64.888
2006	June 16	Sean Caisse	Andy Santerre Racing (3)	Chevrolet	150	75 (120.721)	1:37:35	46.114
2007	June 8	Eddie MacDonald	LaChance Racing	Chevrolet	150	75 (120.721)	1:12:36	61.983
2008	October 12	Peyton Sellers	Andy Santerre Racing (4)	Chevrolet	150	75 (120.721)	1:09:50	64.439
2009 - 2015	Not held							
2016	June 17	Noah Gragson	Jefferson Pitts Racing	Ford (4)	153*	79 (127.138)	1:09:36	65.948

- 1987: Race shortened to 82 laps, 41 miles (66.0 km) due to rain.
- 1994–1995, 1998 (2 of 2), 1999 (1 of 2), 2000 (1 of 2), 2002 (1 of 3) and 2016: Race extended due to an overtime finish.
