= Andy Petree Racing =

Stock car auto racing team

Jackson Bros. Motorsports Leo Jackson Motorsports Andy Petree Racing
- Owner(s): Richard Jackson (1985–1989); Leo Jackson (1985–1996); Andy Petree (1996–2004)
- Base: North Carolina
- Series: Winston Cup, Busch Series, Craftsman Truck Series
- Manufacturer: Oldsmobile, Chevrolet
- Opened: 1985
- Closed: 2004

Career
- Drivers' Championships: 0
- Race victories: 12

Andy Petree Racing (APR) was a NASCAR team that won 12 races. Originally formed in 1985 as Jackson Bros. Motorsports, its ownership changed hands several times over the years, with three different owners from its beginning to its closure in 2004. The team was based out of North Carolina, and was always a steady competitor for the win despite never winning a championship.

== Beginnings ==
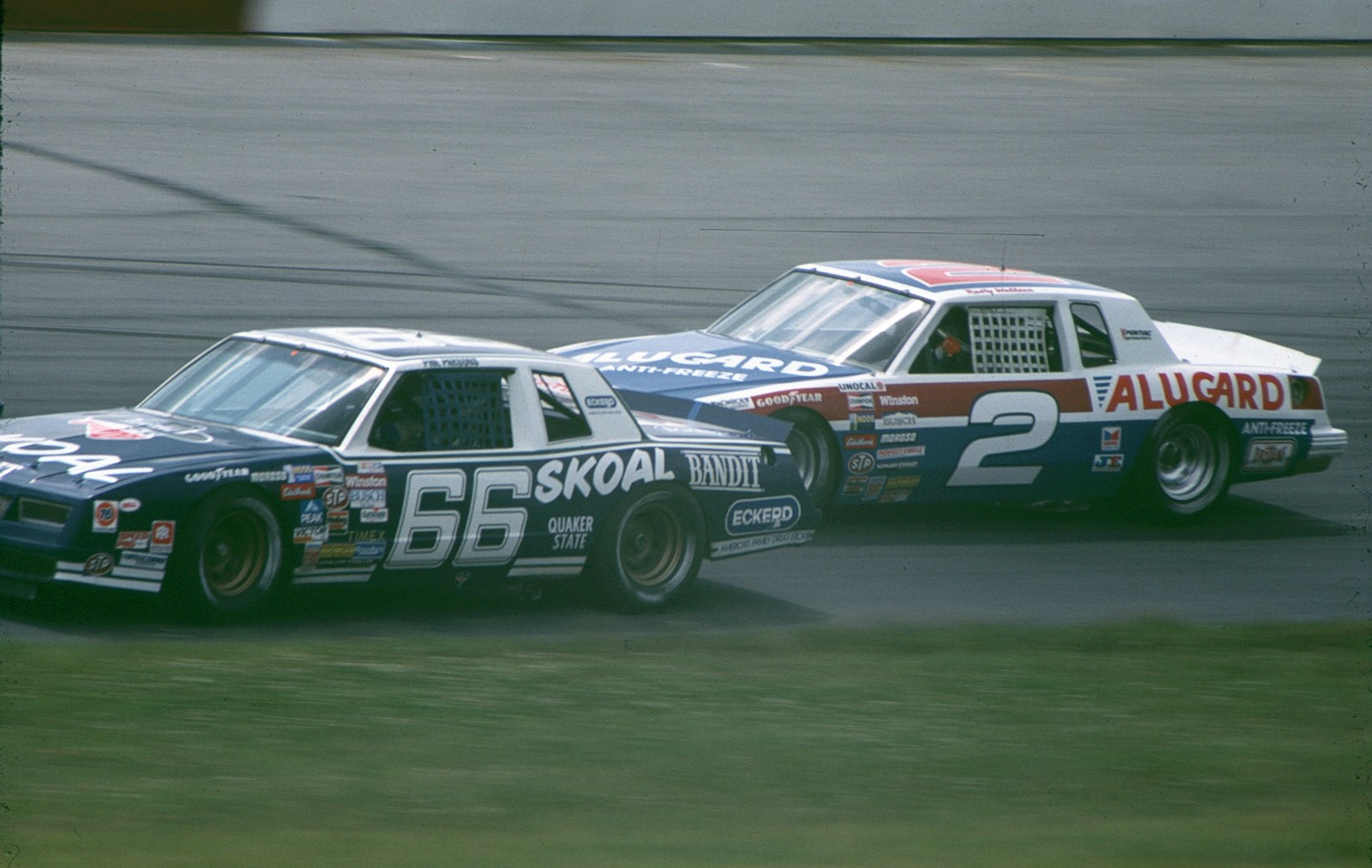
Jackson Motorsports No. 66 in 1985

The team was formed in 1985 by brothers Leo and Richard Jackson. At the Daytona 500 that year, the team entered the No. 55 and No. 66 cars, sponsored by U.S. Smokeless Tobacco Company through its Copenhagen and Skoal brands and driven by another pair of brothers, Benny Parsons and his brother Phil. Benny finished 31st and Phil finished 29th, both suffering engine failure. Phil ran fourteen races with the team that year and posted three top 10s while splitting time with another ride, and Benny ran fourteen races as well and had six top 10 finishes running a limited schedule. The two returned for 1986, when BP had four top tens and won the team's first pole position. Phil ran a limited schedule himself and had five top-tens. After Benny left at the end of the year, his brother moved from the No. 66 to the No. 55. In his first year with the No. 55, Phil Parsons finished a then career-high fourth at Martinsville and finished 14th in points. The No. 66 ran only one race that year, with IndyCar driver Tom Sneva running at Daytona before dropping out with engine failure. In 1988, Parsons improved to a ninth-place finish in points, with the highlight of his year coming with his victory at the Winston 500 despite running out of fuel earlier in the race. In 1989 the team returned to a two-car operation, signing Harry Gant away from Mach 1 Racing with the Skoal sponsorship coming with him. The Jacksons also traded numbers with Mach 1 owner Hal Needham and ran the No. 33 alongside the No. 55. Gant won early in the season at Darlington and finished seventh in points, while Parsons, despite additional sponsorship from Crown Petroleum, only had three top-tens and dropped to 21st in points. At the end of the year, Parsons left for Morgan–McClure Motorsports.

== 1990–1996 ==
In 1990, Richard Jackson splintered from the team to form his own operation, taking the equipment for the No. 55 with him. The newly renamed Leo Jackson Motorsports still held onto the No. 33 and Gant who won at Pocono but finished 17th in points that year. Phil Parsons also returned to the team briefly following his release from Morgan-McClure, pulling substitute duty for Gant at Bristol. 1991 was much better for Gant, as he finished 3rd in points and won four consecutive races late in the season, which began a "Life Begins at 51" campaign because Gant was the oldest winner in the history of the sport. He followed that up with his final two career wins in 1992 and a fourth-place finish in points. In 1993 & 1994, he didn't win but had a pole each year as well as an eleventh-place finish in points in 1993. During his retirement year in 1994, LJM began grooming his replacement, Robert Pressley, who ran three races for the team in the No. 54 sponsored by Manheim Auctions. His best finish was 31st. He moved to the No. 33 full-time in 1995, where he posted a tenth-place at Bristol, and finished runner-up to Ricky Craven for Rookie of the Year. 1996 was a struggle for Pressley and the team, when Pressley was running decently before having to miss the first race at Dover (he was replaced by Greg Sacks). Around this time, Jackson was contemplating retirement and began looking to sell the team. His buyer was his crew chief at the time, Andy Petree. After one race as an owner, he released Pressley and had Todd Bodine finish out the year for him.

== 1997–2001 ==
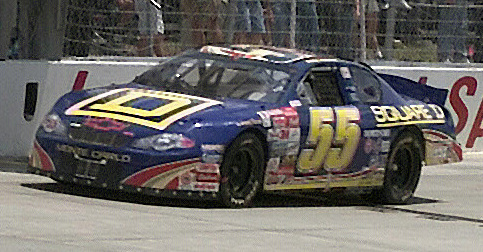
Bobby Hamilton in the No. 55 at Dover in 2001

For 1997, Petree selected Ken Schrader to be his driver. Having won four Cup races, Schrader was solid all season long, as he won the pole for both Loudon races and finished tenth in the points standings. 1998 saw about the same result, with eight finishes of ninth or better, and two more pole positions. APR also expanded to a multi-car operation briefly, fielding the No. 55 Oakwood Homes-sponsored Chevy driven by Hut Stricklin in the Pepsi 400. The team became a multi-car full-time in 1999, with Kenny Wallace signing to drive the No. 55 car with a sponsorship from Square D. The year was "up and down" for Wallace, as he posted a career-best second-place finish at Loudon, but could only muster a 22nd-place points finish. Meanwhile, in the No. 33 team, NASCAR's community was shocked when long-time sponsor Skoal announced it would no longer continue its association with the No. 33. After the team signed Oakwood Homes to be a full-time sponsor for the car, Schrader announced he would leave to pursue other opportunities. After a long search, APR decided to hire Joe Nemechek to pilot the car. While he didn't visit victory lane at all in 2000, he did have three top fives and the first top 25 points finish of his career. After nailing just one top 10 that year, Wallace announced he would leave for Eel River Racing. Wallace finished second at the Winston 500 at Talladega, pushing Dale Earnhardt to the win. It was Earnhardt's last victory before his death the following February in the Daytona 500. It wasn't long before Bobby Hamilton was named to handle the driving chores. When the 2000 season came to an end, APR fielded an unprecedented third team, the No. 35 for Geoff Bodine at Atlanta. 2001 was a banner year for APR, as Hamilton won at Talladega in the same car that Wallace finished 2nd in with last fall, and finished eighteenth in points, while Nemechek had ups and downs, breaking a shoulder at Dover and being replaced by Scott Pruett; Wally Dallenbach Jr.; and Bobby Hamilton Jr. (Hamilton's son). When he returned from his injuries, Nemechek was able to rebound with a victory at Rockingham Speedway and had a respectable 28th-place finish in points. Unfortunately, Oakwood Homes had financial trouble and backed out as sponsor, and Nemechek left to join Haas-Carter Motorsports as a replacement driver for Jimmy Spencer in the No. 26 Kmart-sponsored Ford (a ride that Nemechek, again, would lose due to Kmart filing for bankruptcy in 2002 and pulling their sponsorship from NASCAR).

== Final seasons ==
Oakwood Homes' financial troubles left the No. 33 without a sponsor for 2002. Mike and Kenny Wallace ran limited schedules in the car, with Mike racing the No. 33 in The Winston, but no full-time sponsor could be located. In addition, several attempts to get Jerry Jones to buy into the team failed. The team's fortunes continued to decline as Hamilton, who was struggling intensely, suffered a broken shoulder in a crash. Ron Hornaday Jr. and Greg Biffle were able to fill in, but despite a tenth-place finish in the season finale, Hamilton was not happy, and he departed to the Craftsman Truck Series to race for his own team taking the Square D sponsorship with him. Christian Fittipaldi signed to drive the No. 33 at the Daytona 500, finishing 35th. The team only started one other race that year, with Paul Menard at Watkins Glen, where he finished 29th. In 2004, Menard and Petree ran in the Busch Series in the hopes of attracting major sponsorship for the team's planned return to the Cup series, but Menard signed a contract with Dale Earnhardt, Inc., and took the sponsorship from his father's company with him. Despite running a couple of truck series races, Petree auctioned off all of his equipment, with most of it, including the number, going to the Kevin Harvick Incorporated racing stable which raced as the No. 33 in the Busch Series. He then went on to race once again, and also became a broadcaster and an executive at Richard Childress Racing.

== Driver history ==
=== Car No. 33 results ===
NASCAR Cup Series results
| Year | Driver | No. | Make | 1 | 2 | 3 | 4 | 5 | 6 | 7 | 8 | 9 | 10 | 11 | 12 | 13 | 14 | 15 | 16 | 17 | 18 | 19 | 20 | 21 | 22 | 23 | 24 | 25 | 26 | 27 | 28 | 29 | 30 | 31 | 32 | 33 | 34 | 35 | 36 | Owners | Pts |
|---|---|---|---|---|---|---|---|---|---|---|---|---|---|---|---|---|---|---|---|---|---|---|---|---|---|---|---|---|---|---|---|---|---|---|---|---|---|---|---|---|---|
| 1985 | Phil Parsons | 66 | Olds | DAY; 29 | RCH | CAR | ATL; 41 | BRI | DAR; 8 | NWS | MAR | TAL; 34 | DOV | CLT; 33 | RSD | POC; 11 | MCH; 19 | DAY; 27 | POC; 8 | TAL; 31 | MCH; 6 | BRI | DAR; 39 | RCH | DOV | MAR | NWS | CLT; 27 | CAR | ATL; 14 | RSD | | | | | | | | | 21st | 2740 |
| 1986 | Phil Parsons | 66 | Olds | DAY; 24 | RCH | CAR | ATL; 18 | BRI | DAR; 31 | NWS | MAR | TAL; 5 | DOV | CLT; 24 | RSD | POC; 31 | MCH; 33 | DAY; 9 | POC; 37 | TAL; 13 | GLN; 14 | MCH; 9 | BRI | DAR; 22 | RCH | DOV | MAR | NWS | CLT; 10 | CAR | ATL; 10 | RSD | | | | | | | | 27th | 1742 |
| 1987 | Tom Sneva | 66 | Olds | DAY; 29 | CAR | RCH | ATL | DAR | NWS | BRI | MAR | TAL | CLT | DOV | POC | RSD | MCH | DAY | POC | TAL | GLN | MCH | BRI | DAR | RCH | DOV | MAR | NWS | CLT | CAR | RSD | ATL | | | | | | | | 90th | 76 |
| 1989 | Harry Gant | 33 | Olds | DAY; 12 | CAR; 31 | ATL; 29 | RCH; 14 | DAR; 1* | BRI; 10 | NWS; 23 | MAR; 12 | TAL; 7 | CLT; 40 | DOV; 23 | SON; 12 | POC; 2 | MCH; 32 | DAY; 32 | POC; 5 | TAL; 8 | GLN; 19 | MCH; 3 | BRI; 4 | DAR; 6 | RCH; 5 | DOV; 38 | MAR; 2 | CLT; 2 | NWS; 4 | CAR; 29 | PHO; 8 | ATL; 17 | | | | | | | | 7th | 3610 |
| 1990 | Harry Gant | 33 | Olds | DAY; 18 | RCH; 36 | CAR; 11 | ATL; 9 | DAR; 6 | | NWS; 13 | MAR; 26 | TAL; 36 | CLT; 25 | DOV; 34 | SON; 19 | POC; 1 | MCH; 5 | DAY; 7 | POC; 14 | TAL; 15 | GLN; 21 | MCH; 13 | BRI; 26 | DAR; 5 | RCH; 36 | DOV; 4 | MAR; 5 | NWS; 28 | CLT; 26 | CAR; 3 | PHO; 37 | ATL; 19 | | | | | | | | 17th | 3182 |
| 1990 | Phil Parsons | 33 | Olds | | | | | | BRI; 25 | | | | | | | | | | | | | | | | | | | | | | | | | | | | | | | 17th | 3182 |
| 1991 | Harry Gant | 33 | Olds | DAY; 25 | RCH; 3 | CAR; 3 | ATL; 19 | DAR; 27 | BRI; 11 | NWS; 23 | MAR; 5 | TAL; 1 | CLT; 4 | DOV; 3 | SON; 27 | POC; 4 | MCH; 10 | DAY; 23 | POC; 26 | TAL; 39 | GLN; 28 | MCH; 6 | BRI; 19 | DAR; 1* | RCH; 1 | DOV; 1* | MAR; 1* | NWS; 2* | CLT; 4 | CAR; 2* | PHO; 23 | ATL; 4 | | | | | | | | 4th | 3985 |
| 1992 | Harry Gant | 33 | Olds | DAY; 12 | CAR; 3 | RCH; 3 | ATL; 2 | DAR; 2 | BRI; 29 | NWS; 5 | MAR; 5 | TAL; 24 | CLT; 5 | DOV; 1 | SON; 17 | POC; 23 | MCH; 7 | DAY; 23 | POC; 2 | TAL; 17 | GLN; 18 | MCH; 1 | BRI; 26 | DAR; 16* | RCH; 8 | DOV; 6 | MAR; 19 | NWS; 13 | CLT; 8 | CAR; 6 | PHO; 14 | ATL; 13 | | | | | | | | 4th | 3955 |
| 1993 | Harry Gant | 33 | Chevy | DAY; 21 | CAR; 31 | RCH; 9 | ATL; 21 | DAR; 37 | BRI; 28 | NWS; 13 | MAR; 31 | TAL; 23 | SON; 19 | CLT; 18 | DOV; 7 | POC; 3 | MCH; 10 | DAY; 21 | NHA; 17 | POC; 9 | TAL; 8 | GLN; 10 | MCH; 30 | BRI; 4 | DAR; 7 | RCH; 11 | DOV; 5 | MAR; 33 | NWS; 6 | CLT; 12 | CAR; 4 | PHO; 12 | ATL; 28 | | | | | | | 11th | 3524 |
| 1994 | Harry Gant | 33 | Chevy | DAY; 34 | CAR; 37 | RCH; 34 | ATL; 30 | DAR; 8 | BRI; 37 | NWS; 8 | MAR; DNQ | TAL; 23 | SON; 10 | CLT; 7 | DOV; 42 | POC; 16 | MCH; 35 | DAY; 31 | NHA; 17 | POC; 38 | TAL; 21 | IND; 37 | GLN; 10 | MCH; 25 | BRI; 9 | DAR; 41 | RCH; 22 | DOV; 13 | MAR; 8 | NWS; 32 | CLT; 22 | CAR; 31 | PHO; 23 | ATL; 33 | | | | | | 25th | 2720 |
| 1995 | Robert Pressley | 33 | Chevy | DAY; 26 | CAR; 42 | RCH; 35 | ATL; 31 | DAR; 30 | BRI; 10 | NWS; 18 | MAR; 17 | TAL; 18 | SON; 30 | CLT; 24 | DOV; 19 | POC; 37 | MCH; 17 | DAY; 11 | NHA; 13 | POC; 34 | TAL; 27 | IND; 28 | GLN; 34 | MCH; 18 | BRI; 24 | DAR; 17 | RCH; 30 | DOV; 14 | MAR; 34 | NWS; 33 | CLT; 42 | CAR; 29 | PHO; 19 | ATL; 41 | | | | | | 29th | 2663 |
| 1996 | Robert Pressley | 33 | Chevy | DAY; 30 | CAR; 26 | RCH; 16 | ATL; 27 | DAR; 36 | BRI; 17 | NWS; 4 | MAR; 34 | TAL; 7 | SON; 34 | CLT; 33 | | POC; 33 | MCH; 23 | DAY; 17 | NHA; 5 | POC; 25 | TAL; 31 | IND; 30 | GLN; 30 | MCH; 41 | BRI; 33 | DAR; 27 | RCH; 26 | DOV; 32 | MAR; 32 | NWS; 33 | CLT; 32 | | | | | | | | | 32nd | 2485 |
| 1996 | Greg Sacks | 33 | Chevy | | | | | | | | | | | | DOV; 27 | | | | | | | | | | | | | | | | | | | | | | | | | 32nd | 2485 |
| 1996 | Todd Bodine | 33 | Chevy | | | | | | | | | | | | | | | | | | | | | | | | | | | | | CAR; 20 | PHO; 11 | ATL; 32 | | | | | | 32nd | 2485 |
| 1997 | Ken Schrader | 33 | Chevy | DAY; 33 | CAR; 18 | RCH; 35 | ATL; 25 | DAR; 8 | TEX; 18 | BRI; 12 | MAR; 10 | SON; 31 | TAL; 12 | CLT; 38 | DOV; 6 | POC; 23 | MCH; 27 | CAL; 34 | DAY; 15 | NHA; 11 | POC; 14 | IND; 11 | GLN; 14 | MCH; 14 | BRI; 6 | DAR; 10 | RCH; 14 | NHA; 37 | DOV; 12 | MAR; 9 | CLT; 15 | TAL; 4 | CAR; 30 | PHO; 4 | ATL; 20 | | | | | 10th | 3576 |
| 1998 | Ken Schrader | 33 | Chevy | DAY; 4 | CAR; 23 | LVS; 21 | ATL; 17 | DAR; 18 | BRI; 6 | TEX; 21 | MAR; 10 | TAL; 29 | CAL; 15 | CLT; 10 | DOV; 15 | RCH; 4 | MCH; 28 | POC; 43 | SON; 20 | NHA; 9 | POC; 8 | IND; 10 | GLN; 24 | MCH; 14 | BRI; 14 | NHA; 42 | DAR; 13 | RCH; 4 | DOV; 39 | MAR; 13 | CLT; 40 | TAL; 24 | DAY; 9 | PHO; 22 | CAR; 14 | ATL; 7 | | | | 12th | 3675 |
| 1999 | Ken Schrader | 33 | Chevy | DAY; 6 | CAR; 11 | LVS; 18 | ATL; 26 | DAR; 43 | TEX; 17 | BRI; 20 | MAR; 9 | TAL; 6 | CAL; 14 | RCH; 14 | CLT; 7 | DOV; 41 | MCH; 13 | POC; 27 | SON; 39 | DAY; 20 | NHA; 35 | POC; 34 | IND; 18 | GLN; 17 | MCH; 25 | BRI; 10 | DAR; 9 | RCH; 21 | NHA; 12 | DOV; 26 | MAR; 21 | CLT; 23 | TAL; 25 | CAR; 30 | PHO; 14 | HOM; 29 | ATL; 19 | | | 15th | 3479 |
| 2000 | Joe Nemechek | 33 | Chevy | DAY; 42 | CAR; 30 | LVS; 9 | ATL; 5 | DAR; 41 | BRI; 25 | TEX; 37 | MAR; 17 | TAL; 22 | CAL; 20 | RCH; 23 | CLT; 23 | DOV; 7 | MCH; 18 | POC; 42 | SON; 11 | DAY; 11 | NHA; 2 | POC; 34 | IND; 18 | GLN; 8 | MCH; 23 | BRI; 27 | DAR; 31 | RCH; 40 | NHA; 9 | DOV; 7 | MAR; 14 | CLT; 14 | TAL; 3 | CAR; 10 | PHO; 24 | HOM; 18 | ATL; 25 | | | 15th | 3534 |
| 2001 | Joe Nemechek | 33 | Chevy | DAY; 11 | CAR; 17 | LVS; 35 | ATL; 17 | DAR; 24 | BRI; 43 | TEX; 41 | MAR; 16 | TAL; 6 | CAL; 20 | RCH; 19 | | | | | | DAY; 27 | CHI; 16 | NHA; 41 | POC; 23 | IND; 20 | GLN; 32 | MCH; 22 | BRI; 24 | DAR; 33 | RCH; 16 | DOV; 7 | KAN; 20 | CLT; 20 | MAR; 23 | TAL; 8 | PHO; 35 | CAR; 1* | HOM; 31 | ATL; 39 | NHA; 20 | 28th | 2994 |
| 2001 | Bobby Hamilton Jr. | 33 | Chevy | | | | | | | | | | | | CLT; 39 | DOV; 42 | MCH; 24 | | | | | | | | | | | | | | | | | | | | | | | 28th | 2994 |
| 2001 | Wally Dallenbach Jr. | 33 | Chevy | | | | | | | | | | | | | | | POC; 26 | | | | | | | | | | | | | | | | | | | | | | 28th | 2994 |
| 2001 | Scott Pruett | 33 | Chevy | | | | | | | | | | | | | | | | SON; 12 | | | | | | | | | | | | | | | | | | | | | 28th | 2994 |
| 2002 | Mike Wallace | 33 | Chevy | DAY; 21 | CAR; 38 | LVS | ATL | DAR | BRI | TEX | MAR | TAL; 42 | CAL | RCH | CLT | DOV | POC | MCH | SON | DAY; 41 | CHI | NHA | POC | IND | GLN | MCH | BRI | DAR | RCH | NHA | DOV | KAN | | | | | | | | 41st | 1551 |
| 2002 | Kenny Wallace | 33 | Chevy | | | | | | | | | | | | | | | | | | | | | | | | | | | | | | TAL; 33 | CLT | MAR | ATL | CAR | PHO | HOM | 41st | 1551 |
| 2003 | Christian Fittipaldi | 33 | Chevy | DAY; 35 | CAR | LVS | ATL | DAR | BRI | TEX | TAL | MAR | CAL | RCH | CLT | DOV | POC | MCH | | | | | | | | | | | | | | | | | | | | | | 44th | 857 |
| 2003 | Paul Menard | 33 | Chevy | | | | | | | | | | | | | | | | SON; DNQ | DAY | CHI | NHA | POC | IND | GLN; 29 | MCH | BRI | DAR | RCH | NHA | DOV | TAL | KAN | CLT | MAR | ATL | PHO | CAR | HOM | 44th | 857 |

=== Car No. 55 results ===
NASCAR Cup Series results
| Year | Driver | No. | Make | 1 | 2 | 3 | 4 | 5 | 6 | 7 | 8 | 9 | 10 | 11 | 12 | 13 | 14 | 15 | 16 | 17 | 18 | 19 | 20 | 21 | 22 | 23 | 24 | 25 | 26 | 27 | 28 | 29 | 30 | 31 | 32 | 33 | 34 | 35 | 36 | Owners | Pts |
|---|---|---|---|---|---|---|---|---|---|---|---|---|---|---|---|---|---|---|---|---|---|---|---|---|---|---|---|---|---|---|---|---|---|---|---|---|---|---|---|---|---|
| 1985 | Benny Parsons | 55 | Chevy | DAY; 31 | RCH | CAR | ATL; 8 | BRI | DAR; 32 | NWS | MAR | TAL; 29 | DOV | CLT; 42 | RSD | POC; 6 | MCH; 10 | DAY; 11 | POC; 6 | TAL; 36 | MCH; 5 | BRI | DAR; 8 | RCH | DOV | MAR | NWS | CLT; 41 | CAR | ATL; 33 | RSD | | | | | | | | | 29th | 1427 |
| 1986 | Benny Parsons | 55 | Olds | DAY; 5 | RCH | CAR | ATL; 6 | BRI | DAR; 28 | NWS | MAR | TAL; 20 | DOV | CLT; 34 | RSD | POC; 33 | MCH; 41 | DAY; 36 | POC; 29 | TAL; 5 | GLN; 8 | MCH; 26 | BRI | DAR; 31 | RCH | DOV | MAR | NWS | CLT; 30 | CAR | ATL; 11 | RSD; 27 | | | | | | | | 30th | 1555 |
| 1987 | Phil Parsons | 55 | Olds | DAY; 11 | CAR; 11 | RCH; 15 | ATL; 27 | DAR; 9 | NWS; 7 | BRI; 20 | MAR; 4 | TAL; 31 | CLT; 8 | DOV; 22 | POC; 11 | RSD; 11 | MCH; 21 | DAY; 15 | POC; 39 | TAL; 29 | GLN; 7 | MCH; 14 | BRI; 19 | DAR; 12 | RCH; 20 | DOV; 29 | MAR; 16 | NWS; 14 | CLT; 27 | CAR; 9 | RSD; 13 | ATL; 8 | | | | | | | | 14th | 3327 |
| 1988 | Phil Parsons | 55 | Olds | DAY; 3 | RCH; 30 | CAR; 15 | ATL; 37 | DAR; 8 | BRI; 22 | NWS; 7 | MAR; 9 | TAL; 1 | CLT; 8 | DOV; 39 | RSD; 5 | POC; 8 | MCH; 7 | DAY; 3 | POC; 31 | TAL; 11 | GLN; 4 | MCH; 20 | BRI; 19 | DAR; 6 | RCH; 24 | DOV; 14 | MAR; 21 | CLT; 27 | NWS; 2 | CAR; 8 | PHO; 9 | ATL; 16 | | | | | | | | 9th | 3630 |
| 1989 | Phil Parsons | 55 | Olds | DAY; 5 | CAR; 39 | ATL; 14 | RCH; 27 | DAR; 41 | BRI; 23 | NWS; DNQ | MAR; 13 | TAL; 17 | CLT; 13 | DOV; 10 | SON; 18 | POC; 12 | MCH; 15 | DAY; 3 | POC; 12 | TAL; 41 | GLN; 17 | MCH; 33 | BRI; 11 | DAR; 21 | RCH; 36 | DOV; 13 | MAR; 14 | CLT; 20 | NWS; 28 | CAR; 24 | PHO; 37 | ATL; 42 | | | | | | | | 21st | 2933 |
| 1994 | Robert Pressley | 54 | Chevy | DAY; 40 | CAR | RCH | ATL | DAR | BRI | NWS | MAR | TAL | SON | CLT | DOV | POC | MCH | DAY | NHA; DNQ | POC | TAL | IND; DNQ | GLN | MCH; DNQ | BRI | DAR | RCH | DOV | MAR | NWS | CLT; 31 | CAR | PHO | ATL; 35 | | | | | | 57th | 171 |
| 1998 | Hut Stricklin | 55 | Chevy | DAY | CAR | LVS | ATL | DAR | BRI | TEX | MAR | TAL | CAL | CLT | DOV | RCH | MCH | POC | SON | NHA | POC | IND | GLN | MCH | BRI | NHA | DAR | RCH | DOV | MAR | CLT | TAL | DAY; 42 | PHO | CAR | ATL | | | | 65th | 37 |
| 1999 | Kenny Wallace | 55 | Chevy | DAY; 42 | CAR; 13 | LVS; 40 | ATL; 29 | DAR; 23 | TEX; 39 | BRI; 16 | MAR; 6 | TAL; 7 | CAL; 27 | RCH; 41 | CLT; 12 | DOV; 39 | MCH; 21 | POC; 25 | SON; 14 | DAY; 15 | NHA; 2 | POC; 37 | IND; 39 | GLN; 19 | MCH; 27 | BRI; 11 | DAR; 35 | RCH; 12 | NHA; 34 | DOV; 43 | MAR; 5 | CLT; 30 | TAL; 5 | CAR; 16 | PHO; 18 | HOM; 15 | ATL; 34 | | | 22nd | 3210 |
| 2000 | Kenny Wallace | 55 | Chevy | DAY; 29 | CAR; 24 | LVS; 39 | ATL; 37 | DAR; 35 | BRI; 20 | TEX; 21 | MAR; 42 | TAL; 40 | CAL; 36 | RCH; 20 | CLT; 27 | DOV; 18 | MCH; 31 | POC; 23 | SON; 13 | DAY; 19 | NHA; 26 | POC; 21 | IND; 29 | GLN; 14 | MCH; 30 | BRI; 26 | DAR; 35 | RCH; 14 | NHA; 43 | DOV; 15 | MAR; 22 | CLT; 37 | TAL; 2 | CAR; 43 | PHO; 19 | HOM; 24 | ATL; 23 | | | 26th | 2874 |
| 2001 | Bobby Hamilton | 55 | Chevy | DAY; 8 | CAR; 13 | LVS; 30 | ATL; 22 | DAR; 9 | BRI; 8 | TEX; 18 | MAR; 4* | TAL; 1 | CAL; 36 | RCH; 28 | CLT; 24 | DOV; 20 | MCH; 22 | POC; 33 | SON; 15 | DAY; 38 | CHI; 30 | NHA; 29 | POC; 29 | IND; 27 | GLN; 36 | MCH; 28 | BRI; 23 | DAR; 15 | RCH; 13 | DOV; 10 | KAN; 15 | CLT; 31 | MAR; 13 | TAL; 5 | PHO; 36 | CAR; 22 | HOM; 39 | ATL; 27 | NHA; 29 | 18th | 3575 |
| 2002 | Bobby Hamilton | 55 | Chevy | DAY; 32 | CAR; 9 | LVS; 43 | ATL; 29 | DAR; 13 | BRI; 28 | TEX; 31 | MAR; 27 | TAL; 22 | CAL; 30 | RCH; 17 | CLT; 23 | DOV; 9 | POC; 27 | MCH; 37 | SON; 31 | DAY; 16 | CHI; 15 | NHA; 26 | POC; 19 | IND; 23 | GLN; 19 | MCH; 23 | BRI; 11 | DAR; 23 | | | | | | CLT; 27 | MAR; 25 | ATL; 35 | CAR; 38 | PHO; 29 | HOM; 10 | 32nd | 2832 |
| 2002 | Greg Biffle | 55 | Chevy | | | | | | | | | | | | | | | | | | | | | | | | | | RCH; 33 | NHA; 27 | DOV; 33 | KAN; 36 | | | | | | | | 32nd | 2832 |
| 2002 | Ron Hornaday Jr. | 55 | Chevy | | | | | | | | | | | | | | | | | | | | | | | | | | | | | | TAL; 32 | | | | | | | 32nd | 2832 |
