= Hut Stricklin =

American stock car racing driver and "Alabama Gang" member

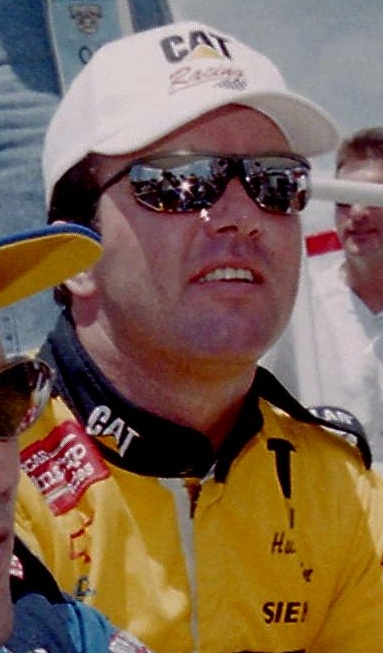
- Stricklin in 1998
- Born: Waymond Lane Stricklin Jr. June 24, 1961 (age 65); Calera, Alabama, U.S.
- Achievements: 1987 NASCAR Dash Series champion

NASCAR Cup Series career
- 328 races run over 15 years
- 2002 position: 40th
- Best finish: 16th (1991)
- First race: 1987 Holly Farms 400 (North Wilkesboro)
- Last race: 2002 Sharpie 500 (Bristol)
Wins	Top tens	Poles
0	29	1

NASCAR O'Reilly Auto Parts Series career
- 54 races run over 12 years
- 2000 position: 45th
- Best finish: 25th (1992)
- First race: 1985 Miller 400 (Charlotte)
- Last race: 2000 NAPAonline.com 250 (Michigan)
Wins	Top tens	Poles
0	8	2
- Statistics up to date as of July 3, 2012.

Waymond Lane "Hut" Stricklin Jr. (born June 24, 1961) is an American former professional stock car racing driver.

== Racing career ==
Stricklin grew up in Calera, Alabama. He married Pam Allison, the daughter of NASCAR legend Donnie Allison after they were introduced by her cousin and fellow racer Davey Allison. Stricklin was the last member of the Alabama Gang.

In 1987, Stricklin won NASCAR's Dash Series championship and made his debut in what was then the Winston Cup Series.

Two years later, Stricklin finished second to Dick Trickle in the NASCAR Rookie of the Year competition with car owner Rod Osterlund. In his sophomore season, he competed in only three events before taking over the driving chores of Bobby Allison's No. 12 Raybestos Brakes Buick. 1991 turned out to be one of his best seasons, as he finished 16th in points as well as a career high second-place finish at Michigan International Speedway. With eight races left in the 1992 season, Stricklin was fired by Allison. Stricklin ended the season driving for Junie Donlavey. For 1993, Stricklin signed with Junior Johnson, driving the No. 27 McDonald's Ford. In 1994, Stricklin paired with owner Travis Carter to form a new team, the No. 23 Camel Cigarettes Ford. It was a disappointing year for Stricklin, finishing 26th in points.

After Stricklin failed to find a ride for 1995, he served as a consultant for Kenny Bernstein's rookie driver Steve Kinser, a World of Outlaws Sprint Car champion who was struggling to transition from dirt to pavement. During the season, Kinser resigned, and Stricklin took over, posting five top-ten finishes. However, the team closed at the end of the year.

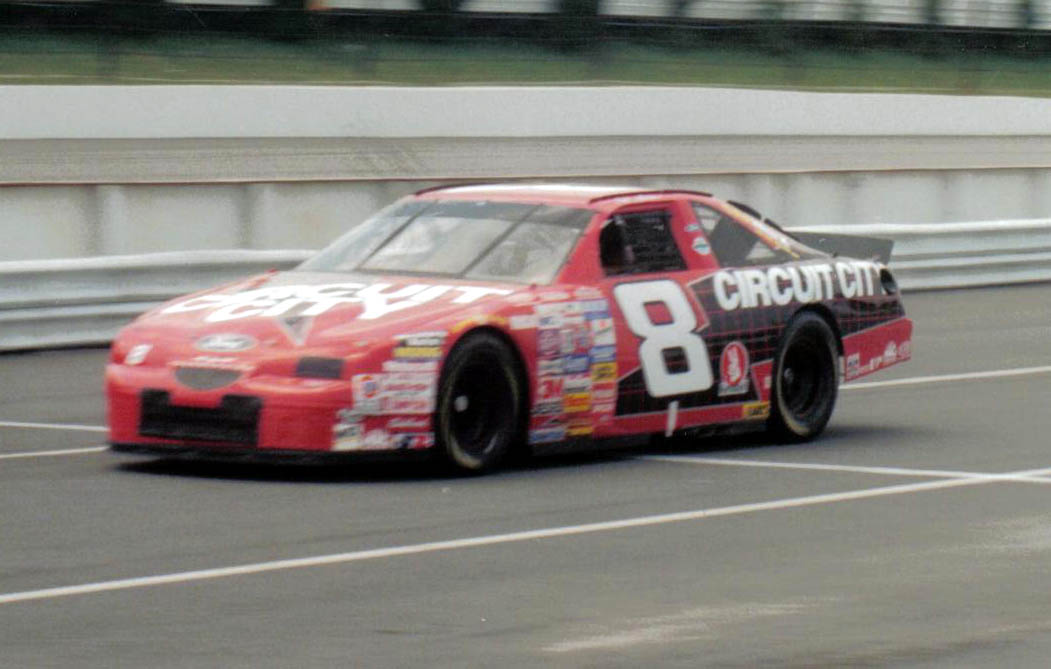
1997 racecar with Stavola Brothers Racing

Stricklin joined the Stavola Brothers Racing No. 8 Circuit City Ford in 1996. He had a second-place finish at Darlington Raceway, and ended up 22nd in points that year.

In 1998, Stricklin started the season with the Stavola Brothers, but was released after failing to make the Coca-Cola 600. Stricklin ended the season as a substitute for David Green and Robert Pressley.

The 1999 season presented Stricklin with a new challenge. He was now the crew chief for Gary Bradberry's No. 78 Ford for Triad Motorsports. When that team was sold, Stricklin took over the No. 58 Ford for SBIII Motorsports. He posted some of the best finishes of the year for that team, including a top-ten finish at Michigan. Despite posting three consecutive DNQs, Stricklin appeared to have found solid footing, as Barbour announced that he would be his driver through 2003, and would have Motorsports Safety Technologies as his sponsor. However, sponsorship again plagued Stricklin, as shortly after signing the deal, MST produced a bounced check, causing Barbour's team to close its doors for good.

In 2000, Stricklin drove for Donlavey in the Brickyard 400 and finished 14th. In 2001, Strickin had a sixth-place finish at Michigan. However, Sara Lee, parent company of sponsor Hills Brothers Coffee demanded Donlavey pull their decals after he released Stricklin from the team. In 2002, Stricklin moved to Bill Davis Racing, bringing Hills Bros. with him. However, Stricklin was replaced with Kenny Wallace prior to the Southern 500. He has not raced since.

== Motorsports career results ==
=== NASCAR ===
(key) (Bold – Pole position awarded by qualifying time. Italics – Pole position earned by points standings or practice time. * – Most laps led.)

==== Winston Cup Series ====
Winston Cup Series results
Year	Team	No.	Make	1	2	3	4	5	6	7	8	9	10	11	12	13	14	15	16	17	18	19	20	21	22	23	24	25	26	27	28	29	30	31	32	33	34	35	36	NWCC	Pts	Ref
1987	Jaehne Motorsports	76	Olds	DAY	CAR	RCH	ATL	DAR	NWS	BRI	MAR	TAL	CLT	DOV	POC	RSD	MCH	DAY	POC	TAL	GLN	MCH	BRI	DAR	RCH	DOV	MAR	NWS; 28	CLT	CAR; 29	RSD	ATL; 16								59th	270	
1988	Jaehne Motorsports	76	Pontiac	DAY	RCH	CAR	ATL	DAR	BRI	NWS	MAR	TAL	CLT	DOV	RSD	POC	MCH	DAY; DNQ	POC																					N/A	–	
1988	Jaehne Motorsports	76	Olds																	TAL; DNQ	GLN	MCH	BRI	DAR	RCH	DOV	MAR	CLT	NWS	CAR	PHO	ATL								N/A	–	
1989	Osterlund Racing	57	Pontiac	DAY; DNQ	CAR; 41	ATL; 8	RCH; DNQ	DAR; 30	BRI; 28	NWS; 16	MAR; 30	TAL; 33	CLT; 14	DOV; 12	SON; 21	POC; 17	MCH; 33	DAY; 10	POC; 37	TAL; 13	GLN; 22	MCH; 4	BRI; 19	DAR; 19	RCH; 9	DOV; 20	MAR; 17	CLT; 23	NWS; 30	CAR; 22	PHO; 23	ATL; 20								26th	2705	
1990	Tri-Star Motorsports	68	Chevy	DAY; 33	RCH	CAR																																		28th	2316	
1990	Tri-Star Motorsports	18	Pontiac				ATL; 37																																	28th	2316	
1990	Hendrick Motorsports	51	Chevy					DAR; 36	BRI	NWS	MAR																													28th	2316	
1990	Bobby Allison Motorsports	12	Buick									TAL; 9	CLT; 37	DOV; 27	SON; 12	POC; 6	MCH; 32	DAY; 26	POC; 29	TAL; 14	GLN; 23	MCH; 15	BRI; 21	DAR; 20	RCH; 13	DOV; 11	MAR; 13	NWS; 20	CLT; 29	CAR; 34	PHO; 26	ATL; 13								28th	2316	
1991	Bobby Allison Motorsports	12	Buick	DAY; 29	RCH; 22	CAR; 31	ATL; 13	DAR; 32	BRI; 16	NWS; 14	MAR; 10	TAL; 23	CLT; 6	DOV; 6	SON; 35	POC; 28	MCH; 2	DAY; 16	POC; 4	TAL; 29	GLN; 8	MCH; 14	BRI; 22	DAR; 17	RCH; 21	DOV; 4	MAR; 16	NWS; 17	CLT; 36	CAR; 13	PHO; 39	ATL; 13								16th	3199	
1992	Bobby Allison Motorsports	12	Chevy	DAY; 24	CAR; 9	RCH; 9	ATL; 29	DAR; 29	BRI; 8	NWS; 18	MAR; 11	TAL; 22	CLT; 34	DOV; 7	SON; 27	POC; 31	MCH; 35	DAY; 18	POC; 21	TAL; 16	GLN; 36		BRI; 27																	27th	2689	
1992	Bobby Allison Motorsports	12	Ford																			MCH; 24		DAR; 11																27th	2689	
1992	Donlavey Racing	90	Ford																						RCH; 30	DOV; 15	MAR; 24	NWS; 30												27th	2689	
1992	Junior Johnson & Associates	97	Ford																										CLT; 31	CAR										27th	2689	
1992	Larry Hedrick Motorsports	41	Chevy																												PHO; 15									27th	2689	
1992	Larry Hedrick Motorsports	41	Ford																													ATL; 41								27th	2689	
1993	Junior Johnson & Associates	27	Ford	DAY; 4	CAR; 13	RCH; 18	ATL; 20	DAR; 28	BRI; 27	NWS; 22	MAR; 26	TAL; 20	SON; 10	CLT; 20	DOV; 15	POC; 13	MCH; 21	DAY; 40	NHA; 25	POC; 28	TAL; 12	GLN; 17	MCH; 34	BRI; 32	DAR; 36	RCH; 17	DOV; 29	MAR; 23	NWS; 28	CLT; 23	CAR; 24	PHO; 36	ATL; 22							24th	2866	
1994	Travis Carter Motorsports	23	Ford	DAY; 33	CAR; 26	RCH; DNQ	ATL; 17	DAR; 17	BRI; 14	NWS; 20	MAR; 20	TAL; 18	SON; 20	CLT; 12	DOV; 9	POC; 13	MCH; 22	DAY; 42	NHA; 36	POC; 22	TAL; 25	IND; 36	GLN; 30	MCH; DNQ	BRI; 35	DAR; 14	RCH; 30	DOV; 32	MAR; 23	NWS; 22	CLT; 21	CAR; 27	PHO; 24	ATL; 16						26th	2711	
1995	Triad Motorsports	78	Ford	DAY	CAR	RCH	ATL	DAR	BRI; DNQ	NWS																														36th	2082	
1995	King Racing	26	Ford								MAR; 33	TAL; 24	SON; 33	CLT; 7	DOV; 4	POC; 5	MCH; 37	DAY; 16	NHA; 27	POC; 41	TAL; 36	IND; 22	GLN; 40	MCH; 10	BRI; 33	DAR; 7	RCH; 32	DOV; 38	MAR; 36	NWS; 25	CLT; 18	**CAR**; 28	PHO; 35	ATL; 38						36th	2082	
1996	Stavola Brothers Racing	8	Ford	DAY; 22	CAR; 30	RCH; 39	ATL; 25	DAR; 20	BRI; 11	NWS; 16	MAR; 31	TAL; 22	SON; 13	CLT; 28	DOV; 34	POC; 29	MCH; 27	DAY; 19	NHA; 23	POC; 32	TAL; 34	IND; 18	GLN; 37	MCH; 26	BRI; 20	DAR; 2*	RCH; 24	DOV; 38	MAR; 25	NWS; 16	CLT; 25	CAR; 11	PHO; 30	ATL; 17						22nd	2854	
1997	Stavola Brothers Racing	8	Ford	DAY; 19	CAR; 36	RCH; 32	ATL; 41	DAR; 26	TEX; 33	BRI; 26	MAR; 14	SON; 29	TAL; 36	CLT; 25	DOV; 19	POC; 24	MCH; 22	CAL; 42	DAY; 36	NHA; 15	POC; 23	IND; DNQ	GLN; 36	MCH; 36	BRI; 23	DAR; 17	RCH; 27	NHA; 10	DOV; 17	MAR; 16	CLT; 35	TAL; DNQ	CAR; 25	PHO; 30	ATL; DNQ					34th	2423	
1998	Stavola Brothers Racing	8	Chevy	DAY; DNQ	CAR; 29	LVS; 43	ATL; 37	DAR; DNQ	BRI; 41	TEX; 40	MAR; 31	TAL; DNQ	CAL; DNQ	CLT; DNQ	DOV	RCH																								50th	700	
1998	American Equipment Racing	96	Chevy														MCH; 42	POC; 28	SON	NHA; 42	POC; 27	IND; DNQ	GLN	MCH; DNQ	BRI; 41	NHA	DAR; DNQ	RCH												50th	700	
1998	Jasper Motorsports	77	Ford																										DOV; 30	MAR	CLT	TAL								50th	700	
1998	Andy Petree Racing	55	Chevy																														DAY; 42	PHO	CAR	ATL				50th	700	
1999	Donlavey Racing	90	Ford	DAY	CAR	LVS	ATL	DAR	TEX	BRI	MAR	TAL	CAL; DNQ	RCH; DNQ	CLT; 33	DOV; DNQ	MCH; DNQ	POC; DNQ	SON																					43rd	918	
1999	LJ Racing	91	Chevy																	DAY; DNQ																				43rd	918	
1999	SBIII Motorsports	58	Ford																		NHA; 39	POC; 15	IND; 33	GLN; DNQ	MCH; 9	BRI; 27	DAR; 27	RCH; DNQ	NHA; 16	DOV; 25	MAR; 14	CLT; DNQ	TAL; DNQ	CAR; DNQ	PHO	HOM				43rd	918	
1999	Butch Mock Motorsports	75	Ford																																		ATL; DNQ			43rd	918	
2000	Donlavey Racing	90	Ford	DAY	CAR	LVS	ATL	DAR	BRI	TEX	MAR	TAL	CAL	RCH	CLT	DOV	MCH	POC	SON	DAY	NHA	POC	IND; 14	GLN	MCH; 39	BRI; DNQ	DAR; 34	RCH; 36	NHA; 28	DOV; DNQ	MAR; 42	CLT; 42	TAL; DNQ	CAR; DNQ	PHO; DNQ	HOM; DNQ	ATL; DNQ			50th	436	
2001	Donlavey Racing	90	Ford	DAY; DNQ	CAR; 31	LVS; 40	ATL; 28	DAR; 28	BRI; DNQ	TEX; 26	MAR; DNQ	TAL; DNQ	CAL; 12	RCH; DNQ	CLT; 16	DOV; 30	MCH; 6	POC; 28	SON	DAY; DNQ	CHI; 31	NHA; 35	POC; 40	IND; 29	GLN	MCH; 32	BRI; DNQ	DAR; 32	RCH; DNQ	DOV; 25	KAN; 35	CLT; 30	MAR; 26	TAL; 36	PHO	CAR	HOM			42nd	1770	
2001	Bill Davis Racing	23	Dodge																																			ATL; 11	NHA	42nd	1770	
2002	Bill Davis Racing	23	Dodge	DAY; DNQ	CAR; 27	LVS; 24	ATL; 43	DAR; 32	BRI; 35	TEX; 27	MAR; 15	TAL; 11	CAL; 40	RCH; 16	CLT; 22	DOV; 26	POC; 22	MCH; 17	SON; 33	DAY; 26	CHI; 36	NHA; 31	POC; 31	IND; 17	GLN	MCH; 36	BRI; 38	DAR	RCH	NHA	DOV	KAN	TAL	CLT	MAR	ATL	CAR	PHO	HOM	40th	1781	

===== Daytona 500 =====
Year	Team	Manufacturer	Start	Finish
1989	Osterlund Racing	Pontiac	DNQ	
1990	Tri-Star Motorsports	Chevrolet	34	33
1991	Bobby Allison Motorsports	Buick	5	29
1992	Bobby Allison Motorsports	Chevrolet	42	24
1993	Junior Johnson & Associates	Ford	18	4
1994	Travis Carter Motorsports	Ford	38	33
1996	Stavola Brothers Racing	Ford	42	22
1997	Stavola Brothers Racing	Ford	28	19
1998	Stavola Brothers Racing	Chevrolet	DNQ	
2001	Donlavey Racing	Ford	DNQ	
2002	Bill Davis Racing	Dodge	DNQ	

==== Busch Series ====
NASCAR Busch Series results
Year	Team	No.	Make	1	2	3	4	5	6	7	8	9	10	11	12	13	14	15	16	17	18	19	20	21	22	23	24	25	26	27	28	29	30	31	32	NBGNC	Pts	Ref
1985		05	Pontiac	DAY	CAR	HCY	BRI	MAR	DAR	SBO	LGY	DOV	CLT	SBO	HCY	ROU	IRP	SBO	LGY	HCY	MLW	BRI	DAR	RCH	NWS	ROU	CLT; 19	HCY	CAR	MAR						76th	106	
1987		33	Olds	DAY	HCY	MAR	DAR	BRI	LGY	SBO; 19	CLT	DOV	IRP	ROU; 12	JFC	OXF	SBO	HCY	RAL	LGY	ROU	BRI; 24	JFC	DAR	RCH	DOV	MAR	CLT	CAR	MAR						44th	324	
1988		9	Pontiac	DAY	HCY	CAR	MAR	DAR	BRI	LNG	NZH	SBO	NSV	CLT	DOV	ROU; 19	LAN	LVL	MYB	OXF	SBO	HCY; 24	LNG	IRP	ROU	BRI	DAR	RCH	DOV	MAR	CLT	CAR	MAR			67th	197	
1989		57	Buick	DAY	CAR	MAR	HCY	DAR	BRI	NZH	SBO	LAN	NSV	CLT; 36	DOV	ROU	LVL	VOL	MYB	SBO	HCY	DUB	IRP	ROU	BRI	DAR	RCH	DOV	MAR	CLT	CAR	MAR				93rd	55	
1990	Allison Racing	28	Buick	DAY; 37	RCH	CAR	MAR	HCY	DAR	BRI	LAN	SBO	NZH	HCY																						107th	52	
1990	Rodney Franklin	58	Pontiac												CLT; 33	DOV	ROU	VOL	MYB	OXF	NHA	SBO	DUB	IRP	ROU	BRI	DAR	RCH	DOV	MAR	CLT	NHA	CAR	MAR		107th	52	
1991	Allison Racing	28	Buick	DAY	RCH	CAR	MAR	VOL	HCY	DAR	BRI	LAN	SBO	NZH	CLT	DOV	ROU	HCY	MYB	GLN	OXF	NHA	SBO	DUB	IRP; 31	ROU	BRI	DAR	RCH	DOV						88th	107	
1991	Martin Racing	92	Chevy																												CLT; 42	NHA	CAR	MAR		88th	107	
1992	Martin Racing	92	Chevy	DAY; 21	CAR	RCH	ATL; 3	MAR														TAL; 5			MCH; 2	NHA		DAR; 13			CLT; 26	MAR				25th	1581	
1992	Martin Racing	92	Olds						DAR; 9	BRI	HCY	LAN	DUB	NZH	CLT	DOV	ROU	MYB	GLN	VOL	NHA; 26						BRI; 25		RCH; 30	DOV; 6			CAR; 11	HCY		25th	1581	
1992	Whitaker Racing	7	Buick																				IRP; 15	ROU												25th	1581	
1993	Allison Racing	28	Ford	DAY	CAR	RCH	DAR	BRI	HCY	ROU	MAR	NZH	CLT	DOV	MYB	GLN	MLW	TAL	IRP	MCH	NHA; 41	BRI	DAR	RCH	DOV	ROU	CLT	MAR; 27	CAR; 34	HCY	ATL; 31					61st	253	
1994	Bobby Allison Motorsports	82	Ford	DAY; DNQ	CAR	RCH	ATL	MAR	DAR	HCY	BRI	ROU	NHA	NZH	CLT	DOV	MYB	GLN	MLW	SBO	TAL	HCY	IRP	MCH	BRI	DAR	RCH	DOV	CLT	MAR	CAR					NA	-	
1995	Stricklin-Arquette Racing	37	Ford	DAY	CAR	RCH	ATL	NSV	DAR	BRI	HCY	NHA	NZH	CLT	DOV	MYB	GLN	MLW	TAL; 40	SBO	IRP	MCH	BRI	DAR	RCH	DOV	CLT	CAR	HOM							109th	43	
1996	Stricklin Racing	28	Ford	DAY; 30	CAR	RCH	ATL; 19	NSV	DAR	BRI; 24	HCY	NZH	CLT; 12	DOV; 31	SBO	MYB	GLN	MLW	NHA	TAL; 12	IRP	MCH; 8	BRI	DAR; 36	RCH	DOV	CLT	CAR	HOM							48th	791	
1998	Martin Racing	92	Chevy	DAY	CAR	LVS	NSV	DAR	BRI	TEX	HCY	TAL	NHA	NZH	CLT	DOV	RCH	PPR	GLN	MLW	MYB	CAL	SBO	IRP	MCH	BRI	DAR	RCH	DOV	CLT	GTY	CAR	ATL; DNQ	HOM		NA	-	
1999	Akins-Sutton Motorsports	38	Ford	DAY	CAR	LVS	ATL	DAR	TEX	NSV	BRI	TAL	CAL	NHA	RCH	NZH	CLT	DOV	SBO	GLN	MLW	MYB	PPR	GTY	IRP	MCH	BRI	DAR; 22	RCH; DNQ	DOV; 16	CLT; 21	CAR; DNQ	MEM; 42	PHO; 29	**HOM**; 21	62nd	530	
2000	Xpress Motorsports	61	Pontiac	**DAY**; 36	CAR; DNQ	LVS; 10	ATL; 11	DAR; 26	BRI; 38	TEX; 37	NSV; 17	TAL; 6	CAL; 36	RCH	NHA	CLT	DOV	SBO	MYB	GLN	MLW	NZH														45th	983	
2000	Jarrett/Favre Motorsports	11	Chevy																				PPR; 28	GTY; DNQ	IRP									PHO; DNQ	HOM	45th	983	
2000	Jarrett Racing	88	Pontiac																							MCH; 27	BRI	DAR	RCH	DOV	CLT	CAR	MEM			45th	983	

Sporting positions
Preceded by Mike Swaim	NASCAR Charlotte/Daytona Dash Series Champion; 1987	Succeeded by Larry Caudill
