= Cale Yarborough Motorsports =

Former NASCAR team

- Owner: Cale Yarborough
- Base: Concord, North Carolina
- Series: Winston Cup Series
- Race drivers: Cale Yarborough; John Andretti; Jeremy Mayfield; Lake Speed; Dick Trickle
- Manufacturer: Oldsmobile (1987–1988); Pontiac (1989–1991); Ford (1992–1999)
- Opened: 1987
- Closed: 2000

Career
- Debut: 1987 Daytona 500 (Daytona)
- Latest race: 1999 NAPA 500 (Atlanta)
- Races competed: 371
- Drivers' Championships: 0
- Race victories: 1
- Pole positions: 3

Cale Yarborough Motorsports was a NASCAR Winston Cup Series team that ran from 1987 to 2000. The team accomplished 13 top fives, 32 top 10s and three poles in total.

== Ownership ==
In 1986, the Race Hill Farms owner Jack Beebe sold his No. 47 Team to Cale Yarborough, who wanted to drive part-time. He bought the team and switched car numbers from 47 to 29.

During the 1988 season, Yarborough split time in the 29 car with Dale Jarrett, who had one top-ten finish in nineteen starts. Following Yarborough's retirement, Jarrett was named the full-time driver for 1989, as he posted two top-five finishes and finished 24th in points. Hardee's left at the end of the season, and was replaced by Phillips 66/TropArtic and Jarrett was replaced by Dick Trickle in the now No. 66 car. Trickle posted two top-fives and won his only career pole at Dover International Speedway, finishing 24th in points. Trickle began 1991 with Yarborough, but left after four races. Lake Speed took over as his immediate replacement, and had three top-ten qualifying efforts. Despite an eleventh-place run at the Busch 500, Speed left and was replaced for the duration of the season by Dorsey Schroeder, Chuck Bown, and Randy LaJoie.

Yarborough hired Chad Little to be his driver in 1992. After six races and no finishes better than 22nd, Little was replaced by Bobby Hillin Jr. for one race, before Jimmy Hensley took over for the rest of the season, posting four top-ten finishes and winning Rookie of the Year honors. In 1993, the team switched to the No. 98 Ford Thunderbird with Bojangles' sponsorship and Derrike Cope driving. Cope had an eighth-place finish at Talladega Superspeedway and finished 26th in points. Cope began 1994 with Fingerhut sponsorship, but after no top-tens, he was replaced by Jeremy Mayfield, whose best finish was a nineteenth at North Carolina Speedway.

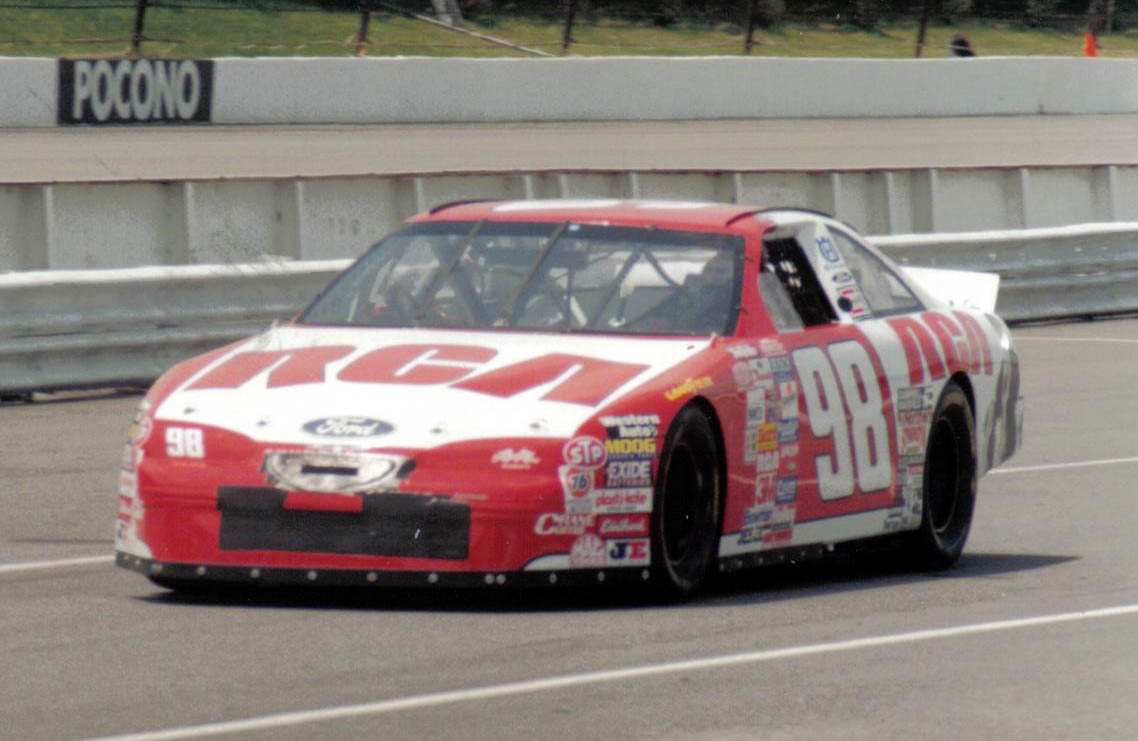
The No. 98 car in 1997.

RCA became the team's new primary sponsor in 1995, and Mayfield had an eighth-place run at Pocono Raceway, finishing 31st in points despite missing four races. In 1996, Mayfield had two top-five finishes and won the pole at the DieHard 500. Towards the end of the season, Mayfield left to drive for Michael Kranefuss, whose previous driver John Andretti moved to 98, finishing fifth at Martinsville Speedway. Andretti won the pole at Talladega again in 1997, and at the Pepsi 400, he led 113 laps and won Yarborough's only race as a car owner.

Despite the win and a 23rd-place points finish, RCA left the sport and Andretti signed with Petty Enterprises. Yarborough signed Greg Sacks to drive his Thorn Apple Valley Ford in 1998, but Sacks suffered a neck injury at the Texas 500 and was unable to race for the rest of the year. Rich Bickle took his place, and had three top-five qualifying runs and a fourth-place finish at Martinsville. Bickle resigned to drive for Tyler Jet Motorsports and Thorn Apple departed due to financial problems within the organization. Due to the lack of financing, Yarborough originally closed his team up, but soon reopened and hired Rick Mast as its driver and car dealer Wayne Burdett as a co-owner. Despite having no primary sponsor, Yarborough and his team ran the full schedule, picking up short-term deals with Sonic Drive-In and Hobas Pipe. Soon after, Burdette left the team and the team signed Universal Studios/Woody Woodpecker as its primary sponsor. At the end of the season, Mast posted two top-tens and did not have a DNF all season, the second driver since Yarborough to accomplish that feat. Despite rumors of a second team with Mike Ciochetti driving, Mast departed for Larry Hedrick Motorsports and Universal left for Team Gordon. Yarborough attempted to sell the team to various businessmen, none of the deals going through. In January 2000, Yarborough closed the team until a buyer could be found. He sold the team in the summer of 2000 to Atlanta area developer Chip MacPherson, who debuted the new team at Lowe's Motor Speedway with Jeff Fuller, finishing 41st after suffering engine failure. Geoffrey Bodine ran the Pennzoil 400 later that year, but wrecked. The team soon disappeared from the Cup circuit.

=== Car results ===
| Year | Driver | No. | Make | 1 | 2 | 3 | 4 | 5 | 6 | 7 | 8 | 9 | 10 | 11 | 12 | 13 | 14 | 15 | 16 | 17 | 18 | 19 | 20 | 21 | 22 | 23 | 24 | 25 | 26 | 27 | 28 | 29 | 30 | 31 | 32 | 33 | 34 | Owners | Pts |
|---|---|---|---|---|---|---|---|---|---|---|---|---|---|---|---|---|---|---|---|---|---|---|---|---|---|---|---|---|---|---|---|---|---|---|---|---|---|---|---|
| 1987 | Cale Yarborough | 29 | Olds | DAY; 10 | CAR; 28 | RCH | ATL; 8 | DAR; 15 | NWS | BRI | MAR | TAL; 37 | CLT; 42 | DOV | POC; 4 | RSD | MCH; 33 | DAY; 24 | POC | TAL; 5 | GLN | MCH; 40 | BRI | DAR; 13 | RCH | DOV; 36 | MAR | NWS | CLT; 24 | CAR; 37 | RSD | ATL; 40 | | | | | | 29th | 1450 |
| 1988 | Cale Yarborough | 29 | Olds | DAY; 38 | | | ATL; 32 | | | | | TAL; 18 | CLT; 38 | | | | MCH; 9 | DAY; 41 | | TAL; 9 | | MCH; 18 | | | | | | CLT; 22 | | | | ATL; 10 | | | | | | 26th | 2622 |
| 1988 | Dale Jarrett | 29 | Olds | | RCH; 26 | CAR; 16 | | DAR; 12 | BRI; 28 | NWS; 21 | MAR; 13 | | | DOV; 20 | RSD; 8 | POC; 13 | | | POC; 25 | | GLN; 11 | | BRI; 26 | DAR; 34 | RCH; 15 | DOV; 28 | MAR; 32 | | NWS; 23 | CAR; 32 | PHO; 31 | | | | | | | 26th | 2622 |
| 1989 | Dale Jarrett | 29 | Pontiac | DAY; 32 | CAR; 11 | ATL; 9 | RCH; 23 | DAR; 40 | BRI; 22 | NWS; 19 | MAR; 15 | TAL; 40 | CLT; 28 | DOV; 11 | SON; 42 | POC; 7 | MCH; 22 | DAY; 31 | POC; 18 | TAL; 23 | GLN; 23 | MCH; 38 | BRI; 10 | DAR; 20 | RCH; 35 | DOV; 23 | MAR; 5 | CLT; 24 | NWS; 27 | CAR; 39 | PHO; 5 | ATL; 16 | | | | | | 24th | 2789 |
| 1990 | Dick Trickle | 66 | Pontiac | DAY; 12 | RCH; 5 | CAR; 23 | ATL; 14 | DAR; 22 | BRI; 13 | NWS; 24 | MAR; 9 | TAL; 27 | CLT; 12 | DOV; 3 | SON; 39 | POC; 25 | MCH; 24 | DAY; 19 | POC; 15 | TAL; 36 | GLN; 30 | MCH; 32 | BRI; 17 | DAR; 11 | RCH; 7 | DOV; 23 | MAR; 22 | NWS; 29 | CLT; 30 | CAR; 36 | PHO; 40 | ATL; 37 | | | | | | 22nd | 2863 |
| 1991 | Dick Trickle | 66 | Pontiac | DAY; 11 | RCH; 15 | CAR; 29 | ATL; 28 | | | | | | | | | | | | | | | | | | | | | | | | | | | | | | | 31st | 2048 |
| 1991 | Lake Speed | 66 | Pontiac | | | | | DAR; 40 | BRI; 25 | NWS; 13 | MAR; 18 | TAL; 31 | CLT; 29 | DOV; 22 | SON; 12 | POC; 17 | MCH; 18 | DAY; 38 | POC; 30 | TAL; 36 | GLN; 33 | MCH; 15 | BRI; 11 | DAR; 34 | RCH; 17 | DOV; 35 | MAR; 32 | | | | | | | | | | | 31st | 2048 |
| 1991 | Chuck Bown | 66 | Pontiac | | | | | | | | | | | | | | | | | | | | | | | | | NWS; 26 | | | | | | | | | | 31st | 2048 |
| 1991 | Dorsey Schroeder | 66 | Pontiac | | | | | | | | | | | | | | | | | | | | | | | | | | CLT; 41 | | | | | | | | | 31st | 2048 |
| 1991 | Randy LaJoie | 66 | Pontiac | | | | | | | | | | | | | | | | | | | | | | | | | | | CAR; 24 | PHO; 32 | ATL; 31 | | | | | | 31st | 2048 |
| 1992 | Chad Little | 66 | Ford | DAY; 39 | CAR; 22 | RCH; 23 | ATL; 23 | DAR; 33 | BRI; 23 | | | | | | | | | | | | | | | | | | | | | | | | | | | | | 27th | 2610 |
| 1992 | Bobby Hillin Jr. | 66 | Ford | | | | | | | NWS; 25 | | | | | | | | | | | | | | | | | | | | | | | | | | | | 27th | 2610 |
| 1992 | Jimmy Hensley | 66 | Ford | | | | | | | | MAR; 15 | TAL; 25 | CLT; 11 | DOV; 8 | SON; 30 | POC; 9 | MCH; 29 | DAY; 15 | POC; 14 | TAL; 31 | GLN; 26 | MCH; 29 | BRI; 7 | DAR; 15 | RCH; 17 | DOV; 13 | MAR; 17 | NWS; 25 | CLT; 18 | CAR; 18 | PHO; 21 | ATL; 8 | | | | | | 27th | 2610 |
| 1993 | Derrike Cope | 66 | Ford | DAY; 29 | | | | | | | | | | | | | | | | | | | | | | | | | | | | | | | | | | 26th | 2787 |
| 1993 | Derrike Cope | 98 | Ford | | CAR; 18 | RCH; 19 | ATL; 17 | DAR; 17 | BRI; 12 | NWS; 30 | MAR; 25 | TAL; 8 | SON; 18 | CLT; 36 | DOV; 31 | POC; 33 | MCH; 27 | DAY; 24 | NHA; 22 | POC; 29 | TAL; 36 | GLN; 11 | MCH; 21 | BRI; 27 | DAR; 17 | RCH; 28 | DOV; 32 | MAR; 20 | NWS; 20 | CLT; 39 | CAR; 19 | PHO; 23 | ATL; 19 | | | | | 26th | 2787 |
| 1994 | Derrike Cope | 98 | Ford | DAY; 21 | CAR; 29 | RCH; 29 | ATL; 34 | DAR; 16 | BRI; 27 | NWS; 27 | MAR; 28 | TAL; 31 | SON; 43 | CLT; 18 | DOV; 23 | POC; 40 | MCH; 37 | DAY; 23 | NHA; 35 | | | | | | | | | | | | | | | | | | | 34th | 2277 |
| 1994 | Jeremy Mayfield | 98 | Ford | | | | | | | | | | | | | | | | | POC; 21 | TAL; 32 | IND; 26 | GLN; DNQ | MCH; 23 | BRI; 21 | DAR; 33 | RCH; DNQ | DOV; 24 | MAR; DNQ | NWS; 27 | CLT; 20 | CAR; 19 | PHO; 20 | ATL; DNQ | | | | 34th | 2277 |
| 1995 | Jeremy Mayfield | 98 | Ford | DAY; 35 | CAR; 18 | RCH; 17 | ATL; 36 | DAR; 31 | BRI; DNQ | NWS; DNQ | MAR; 16 | TAL; 14 | SON; DNQ | CLT; 22 | DOV; 17 | POC; 25 | MCH; 22 | DAY; 32 | NHA; 26 | POC; 8 | TAL; 13 | IND; 29 | GLN; 25 | MCH; 12 | BRI; 30 | DAR; 30 | RCH; 23 | DOV; 19 | MAR; 16 | NWS; DNQ | CLT; 29 | CAR; 11 | PHO; 20 | ATL; 18 | | | | 31st | 2637 |
| 1996 | Jeremy Mayfield | 98 | Ford | DAY; 19 | CAR; 19 | RCH; 28 | ATL; 5 | DAR; 18 | BRI; 21 | NWS; 20 | MAR; 4 | TAL; 32 | SON; 32 | CLT; 41 | DOV; 12 | POC; 15 | MCH; 30 | DAY; 27 | NHA; 36 | POC; 12 | TAL; 16 | IND; 25 | GLN; 22 | MCH; 20 | BRI; 17 | DAR; 37 | | | | | | | | | | | | 21st | 3016 |
| 1996 | John Andretti | 98 | Ford | | | | | | | | | | | | | | | | | | | | | | | | RCH; 36 | DOV; 14 | MAR; 5 | NWS; 24 | CLT; 39 | CAR; 26 | PHO; 19 | ATL; 24 | | | | 21st | 3016 |
| 1997 | John Andretti | 98 | Ford | DAY; 25 | CAR; 34 | RCH; 31 | ATL; 15 | DAR; 25 | TEX; 12 | BRI; 24 | MAR; 28 | SON; 30 | TAL; 4 | CLT; 30 | DOV; 29 | POC; 40 | MCH; 37 | CAL; 21 | DAY; 1* | NHA; 14 | POC; 24 | IND; 17 | GLN; 20 | MCH; 35 | BRI; 11 | DAR; 37 | RCH; 22 | NHA; 17 | DOV; 15 | MAR; 29 | CLT; 32 | TAL; 3 | CAR; 31 | PHO; 39 | ATL; 22 | | | 23rd | 3019 |
| 1998 | Greg Sacks | 98 | Ford | DAY; 39 | CAR; 36 | LVS; 25 | ATL; 31 | DAR; 42 | BRI; 36 | TEX; 38 | | | | | | | | | | | | | | | | | | | | | | | | | | | | 36th | 2173 |
| 1998 | Rich Bickle | 98 | Ford | | | | | | | | MAR; 41 | TAL; DNQ | CAL; DNQ | CLT; 24 | DOV; 31 | RCH; 27 | MCH; 27 | POC; 32 | SON; 31 | NHA; 38 | POC; 28 | IND; 39 | GLN; 22 | MCH; 28 | BRI; 18 | NHA; 40 | DAR; 19 | RCH; DNQ | DOV; 19 | MAR; 4 | CLT; 17 | TAL; DNQ | DAY; 39 | PHO; 11 | CAR; 18 | ATL; DNQ | | 36th | 2173 |
| 1999 | Rick Mast | 98 | Ford | DAY; 10 | CAR; 35 | LVS; 19 | ATL; 16 | DAR; 13 | TEX; 30 | BRI; 19 | MAR; 42 | TAL; 24 | CAL; 31 | RCH; 16 | CLT; 34 | DOV; 34 | MCH; 37 | POC; 12 | SON; 23 | DAY; 32 | NHA; 30 | POC; 19 | IND; 36 | GLN; 23 | MCH; 12 | BRI; 21 | DAR; 30 | RCH; 41 | NHA; 9 | DOV; 34 | MAR; 29 | CLT; 25 | TAL; 26 | CAR; 38 | PHO; 36 | HOM; 28 | ATL; 41 | 32nd | 2845 |
