= Bud Moore Engineering =

Championship-winning NASCAR team

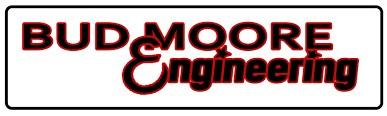
- Owner(s): Bud Moore; Robert, Sue and Randy Fenley
- Base: Spartanburg, South Carolina
- Series: Grand National/Winston Cup
- Race drivers: Joe Weatherly, Buddy Baker, David Pearson, Bobby Allison, Dale Earnhardt, Benny Parsons, Ricky Rudd, Lake Speed, Geoff Bodine
- Manufacturer: Ford Mercury Pontiac
- Opened: 1961
- Closed: 2001
- Website: https://www.budmoore.us/nascar/

Career
- Drivers' Championships: 2
- Race victories: 63

Bud Moore Engineering, later Fenley-Moore Racing, was a championship-winning NASCAR team. It was owned and operated by mechanic Bud Moore and ran out of Spartanburg, South Carolina. While the team was a dominant force in the 1960s and 1980s, the final years were tumultuous due to lack of sponsorship and uncompetitive race cars. The team's numbers are 01, 06, 08, 1, 8, 15, 16, and 62.

== History ==
=== 1960s ===
Bud Moore Engineering debuted in 1961, at a qualifying race for the Daytona 500. The team won its debut with Joe Weatherly driving the No. 8 Pontiac. Weatherly drove for the team for most of the season, and won eight races. Bud Moore Engineering became one of the first multi-car teams in NASCAR history, fielding the No. 18 for five races. Bob Welborn, Fireball Roberts, Cotton Owens, and Tommy Irwin drove that car.

In 1962, Weatherly returned and had a phenomenal year, winning five races and that year's Grand National championship. David Pearson drove the second car(No. 08) at Atlanta Motor Speedway, finishing 11th.

1963 saw Weatherly and Moore repeating as champions, despite winning only three races and running just over half of the schedule. Welborn returned to the second car(No. 06) at Charlotte Motor Speedway, finishing 29th,

Weatherly was considering retirement going into 1964, and he drove only a couple of races for Moore, until tragedy struck. While racing Moore's No. 8 Mercury at Riverside International Raceway, Weatherly began setting up for Turn 6 when he lost control and struck the concrete barrier, then slid across the racetrack where his car came to a stop. Weatherly was dead when workers got to his car. He died when his car hit the barrier, as his head slid out the window and hit the wall, suffering major head injuries. Moore retired No. 8 and switched to No. 1, and hired Billy Wade, the 1963 NASCAR Rookie of the Year, to drive. Wade had a strong year, winning four consecutive races and finishing fourth in points. Bobby Johns, Johnny Rutherford, and Darel Dieringer also saw time in the car, with Dieringer winning at Augusta Speedway.

Wade himself died in a tire test at Daytona International Speedway. Moore retired No. 1 and fielded the Nos. 15 and 16 for Earl Balmer and Dieringer, respectively. Dieringer had another win and a third-place points finish, while Balmer had three top-fives. After that season, Moore cut down to Dieringer's car and ran a limited schedule, with Dieringer nailing down two more victories.

At the end of the season, Dieringer moved on and Moore had a rotation of drivers in his No. 16, Bobby Allison, Gordon Johncock, Sam McQuagg, Cale Yarborough, and LeeRoy Yarbrough all drove, most of whom finished in the top-ten one. In 1968, Cale returned for one race, and Tiny Lund drove for thirteen races, finishing in the top ten seven times. BME only ran one race in 1969, with Don Schissler finishing 36th at the inaugural Talladega 500.

=== 1970s ===
Bud Moore Engineering took a three-year hiatus until 1972, when David Pearson piloted the No. 15 Ford to a 26th-place finish at Riverside. LeeRoy Yarbrough, Dick Brooks, and Donnie Allison also drove that year. In 1973, Bobby Isaac climbed on board with Sta-Power Industries sponsoring. Isaac had six top-ten finishes until the Talladega 500, when he radioed in to Moore and told him he was quitting. When he got out of the car, Isaac announced he was retiring. Some reports surfaced saying Isaac quit because voices in his head had told him to. His replacement was an unpolished rookie named Darrell Waltrip, who had a top-ten at Darlington Raceway.

In 1974, George Follmer drove the car with R.C. Cola as sponsor, but was released after Riverside, and Buddy Baker drove for the rest of the year, and won two poles. Baker stayed on for 1975, and won four races and finished 15th in the championship standings. Baker won one race in 1976 and finished seventh in the points, but did not visit victory lane in 1977. He left at the end of the year.

Baker's replacement was Bobby Allison. Allison won five races each over the next two seasons, including the 1978 Daytona 500, and finished second and third in the points, respectively. By the end of the 1970s, Bud Moore Engineering had returned to prominence.

=== 1980s ===
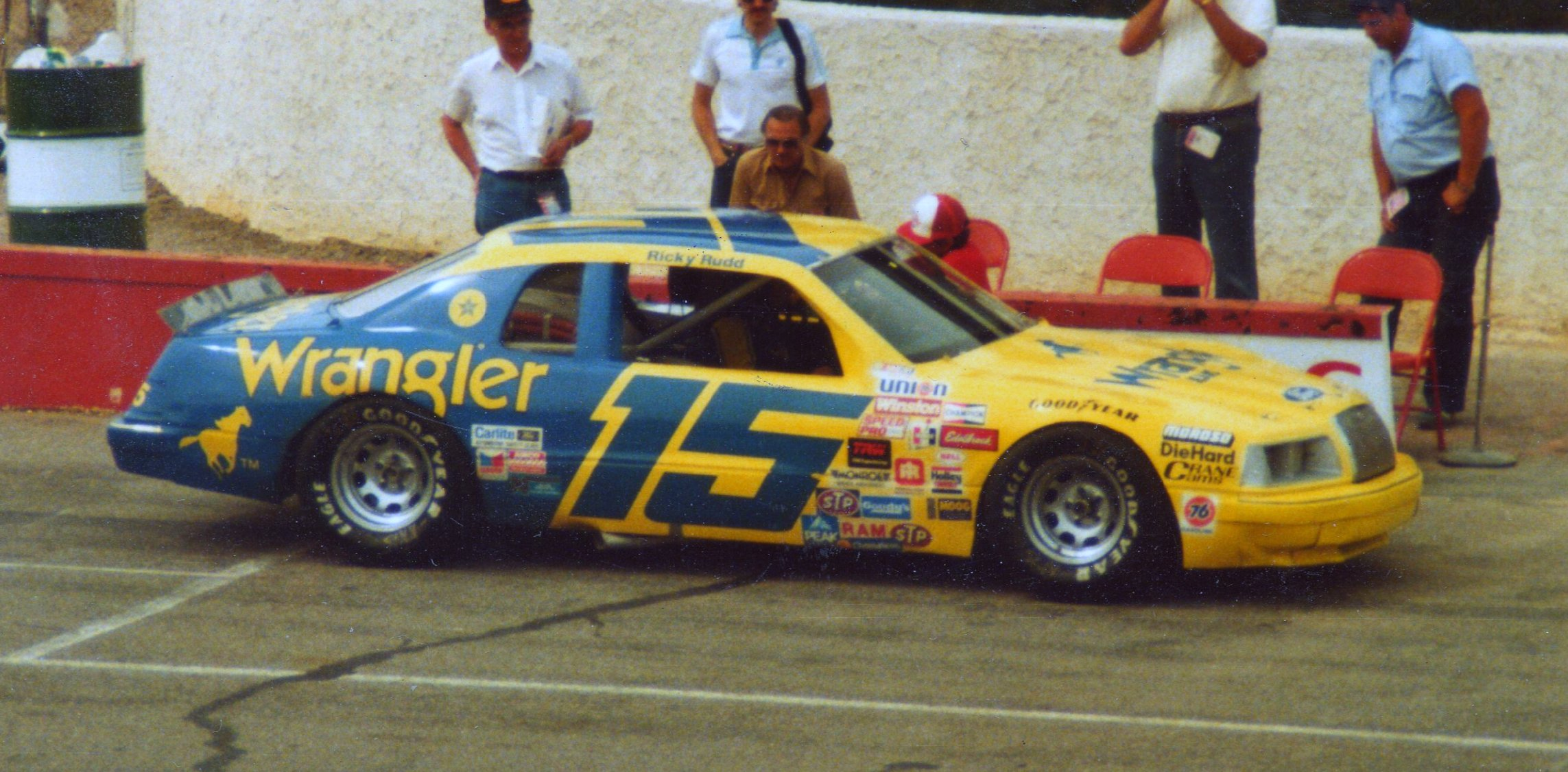
Rudd in Moore's No. 15, from 1984

After Allison won four races in 1980 and finished sixth in points, he left for other opportunities. He was replaced by Benny Parsons, who won three races and finished tenth in points. He too, decided to move on after that season. Moore hit paydirt in 1982 by hiring a hotshot young superstar named Dale Earnhardt and signed Wrangler Jeans as primary sponsor. Earnhardt had one win in his first year, and finished 12th in points. After only improving slightly the next year, Earnhardt departed for Richard Childress Racing, and was replaced by Ricky Rudd (who was driving the No. 3 Childress car that Earnhardt was going to be driving, both with the same Wrangler sponsorship). After a demoralizing start that resulted in Rudd flipping over several times in a crash in the Bud Shootout, Rudd won at Richmond and finished seventh in points. Armed with new sponsor Motorcraft, Rudd won five more races from 1985 to 1987, and had a best points finish of fifth.

After 1987, Rudd departed for King Racing, rookie Brett Bodine replaced him. Compared to the teams' previous success, Bodine's performance was disappointing, and he left to replace Rudd at King.

=== 1990s ===
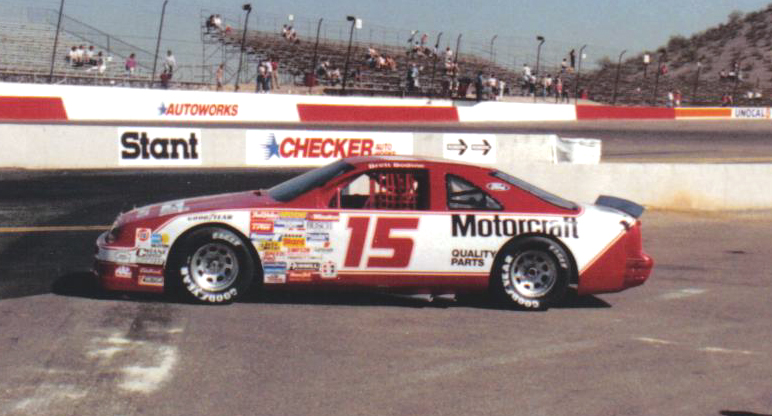
Bud Moore's car, as driven by Brett Bodine in 1989

In 1990, Moore chose Morgan Shepherd to be his new driver. Shepherd had a strong year, winning the Atlanta Journal 500 and finishing a career-best fifth in points. When Shepherd dropped seven points in the standings in 1991, he left for Wood Brothers Racing, and Moore selected Geoff Bodine, older brother of Moore's former driver Brett, to be his new pilot. Despite two wins and eleven top-ten finishes, Bodine finished just 16th in points. Bodine won Moore's last race in 1993 at Sears Point, which was one of Bodine's last races for the team as he purchased the late Alan Kulwicki's AK Racing team five days prior to this victory and was going to become an owner-driver, and took over that car at Dover in September of that year. Lake Speed, who had been announced as the new driver for 1994 on September 3, 1993, took over for Bodine at that Dover race, and his best finish was an 11th at the Mello Yello 500.

Speed returned in 1994, this time with Ford as the sponsor. He had four top five finishes and an eleventh-place finish in points. At the end of the year, Speed departed for Melling Racing, and popular veteran Dick Trickle took over. After a dismal season that yielded just one top-ten, Trickle left the team. Wally Dallenbach Jr. signed on with Hayes Communications in 1996, but only had three top-ten finishes. He and Hayes left the team at the end of the year.

=== Final years ===
After the disappointment of 1996, Bud Moore Engineering did not make a race in 1997, when an attempt to make the Daytona 500 with Larry Pearson failed. In 1998, Moore began developing three-time ARCA champion Tim Steele for a run at Winston Cup with sponsorship from Nike and Sony. Steele had been recovering from injuries sustained in a crash at Atlanta, and with the help of his father and sponsor Rescue Engine Formula, Steele would seek Rookie of the Year honors in 1999. Soon though, the deal fell apart. Loy Allen Jr. attempted the Brickyard 400, but failed to qualify. The team did start two races with Ted Musgrave, both races resulting in DNF's.

After a failed attempt with Jeff Green to qualify for the 1999 Daytona 500, Moore was approached by a California family, Robert, Sue, and Randy Fenley, who were operating a successful NASCAR West Coast team and wanted to expand into Cup. Moore sold the operation to them but remained on board as a consultant. They attempted their first race at that year's Brickyard 400 as the No. 62 with Big Daddy's BBQ Sauce as sponsor. Jeff Davis and Lance Hooper shared the driving duties, but they did not qualify for the race. Nevertheless, the team began preparing for 2000. Late in the year, the team announced they would hire Derrike Cope would drive the No. 15 until the end of 2001. Although no sponsor was named, the team assured Cope that there was enough financial stability for him to run for the entirety of his contract. Cope qualified at Lowe's Motor Speedway for the team in 1999, finishing 35th. Things looked promising for 2000, as Cope had a strong Speedweeks. However, the team soon started to skip races because of financial difficulties. Things went from bad to worse as Moore left the team. Soon afterwards, Cope quit the team in disgust because he felt that he was lied to when he was told the organization was financially secure. Musgrave drove at Talladega and finished 35th. After that, the team moved to North Carolina and hoped to run the ARCA series until they could afford to compete in NASCAR again. That never came to be and the team soon shut down and sold its equipment. Moore's old shop in Spartanburg was purchased by Converse College as a storage facility. Years later a fire broke out in the building and burned most of the old shop down.

== Car Results (Modern Era) ==
=== Car No. 15 Results ===
NASCAR Sprint Cup Series results
| Year | Driver | No. | Make | 1 | 2 | 3 | 4 | 5 | 6 | 7 | 8 | 9 | 10 | 11 | 12 | 13 | 14 | 15 | 16 | 17 | 18 | 19 | 20 | 21 | 22 | 23 | 24 | 25 | 26 | 27 | 28 | 29 | 30 | 31 | 32 | 33 | 34 | Owners | Pts |
|---|---|---|---|---|---|---|---|---|---|---|---|---|---|---|---|---|---|---|---|---|---|---|---|---|---|---|---|---|---|---|---|---|---|---|---|---|---|---|---|
| 1972 | David Pearson | 15 | Ford | RSD; 26 | DAY | RCH | ONT | CAR | ATL; 4 | BRI | | | | | | | | | | | | | | | | | | | | | | | | | | | | (Note: unknown) | |
| 1972 | LeeRoy Yarbrough | 15 | Ford | | | | | | | | DAR; 26 | NWS | MAR | TAL | | | | | | | | | | | | | | | | | | | | | | | | (Note: unknown) | |
| 1972 | Donnie Allison | 15 | Ford | | | | | | | | | | | | CLT; 34 | DOV | MCH; 33 | RSD | TWS | DAY; 8 | BRI | TRN | ATL; 32 | TAL | MCH | NSV | DAR; 38 | RCH | DOV | MAR | NWS | CLT; 25 | | | | | | (Note: unknown) | |
| 1972 | Dick Brooks | 15 | Ford | | | | | | | | | | | | | | | | | | | | | | | | | | | | | | CAR; 34 | TWS | | | | (Note: unknown) | |
| 1973 | Bobby Isaac | 15 | Ford | RSD; 27 | DAY; 2 | RCH; 4 | CAR; 30 | BRI; 15 | ATL; 2 | NWS; 28 | DAR; 33 | MAR; 3 | TAL; 26 | NSV; 7 | CLT; 4 | DOV; 29 | TWS; 32 | RSD; 33 | MCH | DAY; 39 | BRI; 22 | ATL; 35 | TAL; 13 | NSV | | | | | | | | | | | | | | | |
| 1973 | Darrell Waltrip | 15 | Ford | | | | | | | | | | | | | | | | | | | | | | DAR; 8 | RCH; 26 | DOV | NWS; 30 | MAR | CLT; 38 | CAR; 27 | | | | | | | | |
| 1974 | George Follmer | 15 | Ford | RSD; 18 | DAY; 20 | RCH | CAR; 5 | BRI; 28 | ATL; 4 | DAR; 22 | NWS; 6 | MAR; 22 | TAL; 28 | NSV; 6 | DOV; 5 | | | | | | | | | | | | | | | | | | | | | | | | |
| 1974 | Buddy Baker | 15 | Ford | | | | | | | | | | | | | CLT; 22 | RSD | MCH; 30 | DAY; 3 | BRI; 2 | NSV; 25 | ATL; 3 | POC; 2 | TAL; 6* | MCH; 4 | DAR; 33 | RCH | DOV; 2 | NWS; 3 | MAR; 2 | CLT; 37 | CAR; 34 | ONT; 5 | | | | | | |
| 1975 | Buddy Baker | 15 | Ford | RSD | DAY; 20 | RCH | CAR; 25 | BRI; 3 | ATL; 2 | NWS; 3 | DAR; 19 | MAR; 19 | TAL; 1* | NSV | DOV; 11 | CLT; 5 | RSD | MCH | DAY; 2* | NSV | POC; 3 | TAL; 1* | MCH; 6 | DAR; 28 | DOV; 33 | NWS; 4 | MAR; 18 | CLT; 3 | RCH | CAR; 28 | BRI; 24 | ATL; 1* | ONT; 1* | | | | | 15th | 3050 |
| 1976 | Buddy Baker | 15 | Ford | RSD; 28 | DAY; 33 | CAR; 4 | RCH; 29 | BRI; 21 | ATL; 25 | NWS; 26 | DAR; 2* | MAR; 27 | TAL; 1* | NSV; 4 | DOV; 5 | CLT; 28 | RSD; 5 | MCH; 5 | DAY; 35 | NSV; 23* | POC; 2 | TAL; 2* | MCH; 31 | BRI; 5 | DAR; 31 | RCH; 5 | DOV; 5 | MAR; 3 | NWS; 4 | CLT; 4* | CAR; 28 | ATL; 5 | ONT; 39 | | | | | 7th | 3745 |
| 1977 | Buddy Baker | 15 | Ford | RSD; 12 | DAY; 3 | RCH; 9 | CAR; 4 | ATL; 5 | NWS; 4 | DAR; 7 | BRI; 29 | MAR; 24 | TAL; 33 | NSV; 6 | DOV; 9 | CLT; 5 | RSD; 5 | MCH; 6 | DAY; 7 | NSV; 6 | POC; 27 | TAL; 6 | MCH; 30 | BRI; 15 | DAR; 3 | RCH; 27 | DOV; 6 | MAR; 21 | NWS; 9 | CLT; 4 | CAR; 29 | ATL; 7 | ONT; 4 | | | | | 5th | 3961 |
| 1978 | Bobby Allison | 15 | Ford | RSD; 30 | DAY; 1 | RCH; 6 | CAR; 2 | ATL; 1* | BRI; 21 | DAR; 14 | NWS; 6 | MAR; 6 | TAL; 38 | DOV; 8 | CLT; 3 | NSV; 21 | RSD; 3 | MCH; 24 | DAY; 27 | NSV; 7 | POC; 3 | TAL; 6 | MCH; 5 | BRI; 22 | DAR; 5 | RCH; 2 | DOV; 1* | MAR; 7 | NWS; 3 | CLT; 1* | CAR; 2 | ATL; 6 | ONT; 1* | | | | | 2nd | 4367 |
| 1979 | Bobby Allison | 15 | Ford | RSD; 19 | DAY; 11 | CAR; 1* | RCH; 2* | ATL; 2* | NWS; 1 | BRI; 2 | DAR; 26 | MAR; 4 | TAL; 1 | NSV; 3 | DOV; 4 | CLT; 22 | TWS; 2 | RSD; 1 | MCH; 7 | DAY; 30 | NSV; 16 | POC; 9 | TAL; 28 | MCH; 23 | BRI; 3 | DAR; 10 | RCH; 1* | DOV; 6 | MAR; 4 | CLT; 2 | NWS; 2* | CAR; 19 | ATL; 4 | ONT; 2 | | | | 3rd | 4633 |
| 1980 | Bobby Allison | 15 | Ford | RSD; 18 | | RCH; 2 | CAR; 7 | ATL; 3 | BRI; 3 | DAR; 30 | NWS; 3 | MAR; 25 | | NSV; 5 | DOV; 1 | | TWS; 3 | RSD; 15* | MCH; 8 | | NSV; 6 | POC; 34 | | | BRI; 6 | DAR; 6 | RCH; 1* | DOV; 30 | NWS; 1* | MAR; 22 | | CAR; 26 | | ONT; 4 | | | | 6th | 4019 |
| 1980 | Bobby Allison | 15 | Mercury | | DAY; 2 | | | | | | | | TAL; 40 | | | CLT; 26 | | | | DAY; 1* | | | TAL; 35 | MCH; 7 | | | | | | | CLT; 29 | | ATL; 38 | | | | | 6th | 4019 |
| 1981 | Benny Parsons | 15 | Ford | RSD; 16 | DAY; 31 | RCH; 5 | CAR; 24 | ATL; 5 | BRI; 5 | NWS; 21 | DAR; 5 | MAR; 23 | TAL; 36 | NSV; 1 | DOV; 32 | CLT; 37 | TWS; 1 | RSD; 20 | MCH; 3 | DAY; 39 | NSV; 3 | POC; 3 | TAL; 13 | MCH; 26 | BRI; 6 | DAR; 39 | RCH; 1 | DOV; 34 | MAR; 24 | NWS; 29 | CLT; 38 | CAR; 6 | ATL; 36 | RSD; 27 | | | | 10th | 3449 |
| 1982 | Dale Earnhardt | 15 | Ford | DAY; 36 | RCH; 4 | BRI; 2* | ATL; 28* | CAR; 25 | DAR; 1* | NWS; 3 | MAR; 23 | TAL; 8 | NSV; 10 | DOV; 3 | CLT; 30* | POC; 34 | RSD; 4 | MCH; 7 | DAY; 29 | NSV; 9 | POC; 25 | TAL; 35 | MCH; 30 | BRI; 6 | DAR; 3 | RCH; 27 | DOV; 20 | NWS; 20 | CLT; 25 | MAR; 27 | CAR; 14 | ATL; 34 | RSD; 42 | | | | | 12th | 3402 |
| 1983 | Dale Earnhardt | 15 | Ford | DAY; 35 | RCH; 2 | CAR; 33 | ATL; 33 | DAR; 13 | NWS; 29 | MAR; 26 | TAL; 24 | NSV; 24 | DOV; 8 | BRI; 9 | CLT; 5 | RSD; 4 | POC; 8 | MCH; 15 | DAY; 9 | NSV; 1* | POC; 30 | TAL; 1* | MCH; 7 | BRI; 2 | DAR; 11 | RCH; 22 | DOV; 35 | MAR; 4 | NWS; 2 | CLT; 14 | CAR; 17 | ATL; 33 | RSD; 4 | | | | | 8th | 3732 |
| 1984 | Ricky Rudd | 15 | Ford | DAY; 7 | RCH; 1 | CAR; 7 | ATL; 8 | BRI; 6 | NWS; 3* | DAR; 9 | MAR; 18 | TAL; 22 | NSV; 4 | DOV; 8 | CLT; 11 | RSD; 9 | POC; 18 | MCH; 40 | DAY; 15 | NSV; 16 | POC; 39 | TAL; 14 | MCH; 12 | BRI; 16 | DAR; 5 | RCH; 2 | DOV; 3 | MAR; 27 | CLT; 8 | NWS; 6 | CAR; 23 | ATL; 3 | RSD; 15 | | | | | 7th | 3918 |
| 1985 | Ricky Rudd | 15 | Ford | DAY; 5 | RCH; 25 | CAR; 32 | ATL; 4 | BRI; 2 | DAR; 25 | NWS; 4 | MAR; 2 | TAL; 5 | DOV; 4 | CLT; 13 | RSD; 4 | POC; 7 | MCH; 7 | DAY; 7 | POC; 14 | TAL; 18 | MCH; 31 | BRI; 9 | DAR; 6 | RCH; 5 | DOV; 3 | MAR; 4 | NWS; 5 | CLT; 15 | CAR; 7 | ATL; 31 | RSD; 1 | | | | | | | 6th | 3857 |
| 1986 | Ricky Rudd | 15 | Ford | DAY; 11 | RCH; 30 | CAR; 28 | ATL; 26 | BRI; 2 | DAR; 26 | NWS; 2 | MAR; 1* | TAL; 36 | DOV; 4 | CLT; 8 | RSD; 3 | POC; 4 | MCH; 10 | DAY; 6 | POC; 2 | TAL; 3 | GLN; 7 | MCH; 21 | BRI; 23 | DAR; 6 | RCH; 24* | DOV; 1* | MAR; 28 | NWS; 7 | CLT; 4 | CAR; 2 | ATL; 25 | RSD; 19 | | | | | | 5th | 3823 |
| 1987 | Ricky Rudd | 15 | Ford | DAY; 9 | CAR; 2 | RCH; 28 | ATL; 1 | DAR; 30 | NWS; 5 | BRI; 3 | MAR; 16 | TAL; 30 | CLT; 25 | DOV; 12 | POC; 7 | RSD; 2 | MCH; 14 | DAY; 14 | POC; 26 | TAL; 15 | GLN; 4 | MCH; 25 | BRI; 3 | DAR; 7 | RCH; 3 | DOV; 1* | MAR; 21 | NWS; 13 | CLT; 11 | CAR; 31 | RSD; 31 | ATL; 3 | | | | | | 6th | 3742 |
| 1988 | Brett Bodine | 15 | Ford | DAY; 35 | RCH; 27 | CAR; 27 | ATL; 9 | DAR; 15 | BRI; 17 | NWS; 13 | MAR; 27 | TAL; 19 | CLT; 4 | DOV; 31 | RSD; 40 | POC; 35 | MCH; 27 | DAY; 42 | POC; 20 | TAL; 28 | GLN; 23 | MCH; 6 | BRI; 25 | DAR; 17 | RCH; 11 | DOV; 22 | MAR; 10 | CLT; 3 | NWS; 17 | CAR; 29 | PHO; 43 | ATL; 27 | | | | | | 20th | 2828 |
| 1989 | Brett Bodine | 15 | Ford | DAY; 29 | CAR; 34 | ATL; 33 | RCH; 28 | DAR; 14 | BRI; 30 | NWS; 28 | MAR; 27 | TAL; 19 | CLT; 8 | DOV; 15 | SON; 27 | POC; 10 | MCH; 5 | DAY; 11 | POC; 10 | TAL; 14 | GLN; 15 | MCH; 36 | BRI; 17 | DAR; 16 | RCH; 34 | DOV; 9 | MAR; 7 | CLT; 12 | NWS; 17 | CAR; 21 | PHO; 19 | ATL; 23 | | | | | | 19th | 3051 |
| 1990 | Morgan Shepherd | 15 | Ford | DAY; 10 | RCH; 7 | CAR; 7 | ATL; 2 | DAR; 5 | BRI; 8 | NWS; 5 | MAR; 3 | TAL; 8 | CLT; 8 | DOV; 6 | SON; 29 | POC; 11 | MCH; 13 | DAY; 34 | POC; 36 | TAL; 26 | GLN; 6 | MCH; 9 | BRI; 31 | DAR; 21 | RCH; 30 | DOV; 25 | MAR; 25 | NWS; 12 | CLT; 2 | CAR; 12 | PHO; 3 | ATL; 1 | | | | | | 6th | 3689 |
| 1991 | Morgan Shepherd | 15 | Ford | DAY; 34 | RCH; 8 | CAR; 10 | ATL; 4 | DAR; 8 | BRI; 10 | NWS; 4 | MAR; 30 | TAL; 14 | CLT; 14 | DOV; 8 | SON; 42 | POC; 9 | MCH; 9 | DAY; 20 | POC; 34 | TAL; 14 | GLN; 36 | MCH; 26 | BRI; 6 | DAR; 19 | RCH; 23 | DOV; 3 | MAR; 11 | NWS; 3 | CLT; 28 | CAR; 17 | PHO; 10 | ATL; 6 | | | | | | 12th | 3438 |
| 1992 | Geoff Bodine | 15 | Ford | DAY; 3 | CAR; 14 | RCH; 16 | ATL; 6 | DAR; 8 | BRI; 12 | NWS; 4 | MAR; 32 | TAL; 13 | CLT; 32 | DOV; 17 | SON; 10 | POC; 14 | MCH; 11 | DAY; 4 | POC; 30 | TAL; 38 | GLN; 27 | MCH; 40 | BRI; 11 | DAR; 19 | RCH; 5 | DOV; 14 | MAR; 1 | NWS; 1* | CLT; 10 | CAR; 35 | PHO; 39 | ATL; 3 | | | | | | 16th | 3437 |
| 1993 | Geoff Bodine | 15 | Ford | DAY; 3 | CAR; 9 | RCH; 12 | ATL; 6 | DAR; 8 | BRI; 18 | NWS; 28 | MAR; 6 | TAL; 27 | SON; 1 | CLT; 10 | DOV; 23 | POC; 24 | MCH; 17 | DAY; 37 | NHA; 12 | POC; 12 | TAL; 16 | GLN; 16 | MCH; 24 | BRI; 8 | DAR; 20 | RCH; 34 | | | | | | | | | | | | 14th | 3452 |
| 1993 | Lake Speed | 15 | Ford | | | | | | | | | | | | | | | | | | | | | | | | DOV; 33 | MAR; 24 | NWS; 17 | CLT; 11 | CAR; 16 | PHO; 13 | ATL; 26 | | | | | 14th | 3452 |
| 1994 | Lake Speed | 15 | Ford | DAY; 14 | CAR; 21 | RCH; 14 | ATL; 6 | DAR; 5 | BRI; 3 | NWS; 12 | MAR; 30 | TAL; 7 | SON; 32 | CLT; 14 | DOV; 12 | POC; 23 | MCH; 40 | DAY; 10 | NHA; 15 | POC; 20 | TAL; 14 | IND; 15 | GLN; 13 | MCH; 13 | BRI; 25 | DAR; 40 | RCH; 21 | DOV; 9 | MAR; 34 | NWS; 25 | CLT; 5 | CAR; 10 | PHO; 14 | ATL; 4 | | | | 12th | 3565 |
| 1995 | Dick Trickle | 15 | Ford | DAY; 11 | CAR; 22 | RCH; 12 | ATL; 22 | DAR; 28 | BRI; 30 | NWS; 32 | MAR; 24 | TAL; 38 | SON; 24 | CLT; 16 | DOV; 32 | POC; 22 | MCH; 16 | DAY; 12 | NHA; 34 | POC; 10 | TAL; 38 | IND; 18 | GLN; 28 | MCH; 13 | BRI; 35 | DAR; 36 | RCH; 18 | DOV; 23 | MAR; 15 | NWS; 19 | CLT; 32 | CAR; 16 | PHO; 29 | ATL; 23 | | | | 25th | 2875 |
| 1996 | Wally Dallenbach Jr. | 15 | Ford | DAY; 6 | CAR; 23 | RCH; 40 | ATL; 20 | DAR; 37 | BRI; 24 | NWS; 28 | MAR; DNQ | TAL; 12 | SON; 3 | CLT; 19 | DOV; 22 | POC; 12 | MCH; 13 | DAY; 12 | NHA; 18 | POC; 33 | TAL; 32 | IND; 17 | GLN; 10 | MCH; 34 | BRI; 25 | DAR; 25 | RCH; 33 | DOV; 29 | MAR; 22 | NWS; 34 | CLT; 33 | CAR; 36 | PHO; 15 | ATL; 40 | | | | 25th | 2786 |
| 1997 | Larry Pearson | 15 | Ford | DAY; DNQ | CAR | RCH | ATL | DAR | TEX | BRI | MAR | SON | TAL | CLT | DOV | POC | MCH | CAL | DAY | NHA | POC | IND | GLN | MCH | BRI | DAR | RCH | NHA | DOV | MAR | | | | | | | | 60th | 56 |
| 1997 | Greg Sacks | 15 | Ford | | | | | | | | | | | | | | | | | | | | | | | | | | | | CLT; DNQ | TAL | CAR | PHO | ATL | | | 60th | 56 |
| 1998 | Loy Allen Jr. | 15 | Ford | DAY | CAR | LVS | ATL | DAR | BRI | TEX | MAR | TAL | CAL | CLT | DOV | RCH | MCH | POC | SON | NHA | POC | IND; DNQ | GLN | | | | | | | | | | | | | | | 58th | 99 |
| 1998 | Ted Musgrave | 15 | Ford | | | | | | | | | | | | | | | | | | | | | MCH; 39 | BRI | NHA | DAR; 43 | RCH | DOV | MAR | CLT | TAL | DAY | PHO | CAR | ATL | | 58th | 99 |
| 1999 | Jeff Green | 15 | Ford | DAY; DNQ | CAR | LVS | ATL | DAR | TEX | BRI | MAR | TAL | CAL | RCH | CLT | DOV | MCH | POC | SON | DAY | NHA | POC | IND | GLN | MCH | BRI | DAR | RCH | NHA | DOV | MAR | | | | | | | 56th | 93 |
| 1999 | Derrike Cope | 15 | Ford | | | | | | | | | | | | | | | | | | | | | | | | | | | | | CLT; 35 | TAL | CAR | PHO | HOM | ATL; DNQ | 56th | 93 |
| 2000 | Derrike Cope | 15 | Ford | DAY; 41 | CAR | LVS; 37 | ATL; 19 | DAR; DNQ | BRI | TEX | MAR | | | | | | | | | | | | | | | | | | | | | | | | | | | 49th | 318 |
| 2000 | Ted Musgrave | 15 | Ford | | | | | | | | | TAL; 35 | CAL | RCH | CLT; DNQ | DOV | MCH | POC | SON | DAY | NHA | POC | IND | GLN | MCH | BRI | DAR | RCH | NHA | DOV | MAR | CLT | TAL | CAR | PHO | HOM | ATL | 49th | 318 |

Footnotes
