= 1998 Daytona 500 =

Auto race run in Florida in 1998

Race details
- Race 1 of 33 in the 1998 NASCAR Winston Cup Series
- 1998 Daytona 500 logo
- Date: February 15, 1998
- Location: Daytona International Speedway; Daytona Beach, Florida, U.S.
- Course: Permanent racing facility 2.5 mi (4.02336 km)
- Distance: 200 laps, 500 mi (804.672 km)
- Weather: Overcast with temperatures up to 70 °F (21 °C); wind speeds up to 14 miles per hour (23 km/h)
- Average speed: 172.712 miles per hour (277.953 km/h)

Pole position
Driver	Bobby Labonte	Joe Gibbs Racing
- Time: 46.776 seconds

Qualifying race winners
Duel 1 Winner	Sterling Marlin	SABCO Racing
Duel 2 Winner	Dale Earnhardt	Richard Childress Racing

Most laps led
Driver	Dale Earnhardt	Richard Childress Racing
- Laps: 107

Winner
No. 3	Dale Earnhardt	Richard Childress Racing

Television in the United States
- Network: CBS
- Announcers: Mike Joy, Buddy Baker, and Ned Jarrett
- Nielsen ratings: 8.6/23 (13.04 million viewers)

Radio in the United States
- Radio: MRN
- Booth announcers: Allen Bestwick and Barney Hall
- Turn announcers: Joe Moore (1 & 2), Mike Bagley (Backstretch), Fred Armstrong (3 & 4)

The 1998 Daytona 500, the 40th running of the event, was held on February 15 at Daytona International Speedway in Daytona Beach, Florida as the first race of the 1998 NASCAR Winston Cup season. It was Dale Earnhardt's only Daytona 500 victory after 19 previous attempts. It was Earnhardt's 20th 500 start and CBS's 20th consecutive live broadcast of the Daytona 500. Also, his Daytona 500 win ended a 59-race winless streak dating back to Atlanta Motor Speedway in March 1996.

The race had three cautions - all of which were for minor incidents, and there were no accident-related retirements. The race was run under the green flag for the first 125 laps. This resulted in it being the second-fastest Daytona 500 ever, behind the 1980 Daytona 500 won by Buddy Baker, and the fastest of the restrictor plate era.

== Background ==
Daytona International Speedway, the track where the race was held.

Daytona International Speedway is a race track in Daytona Beach, Florida that is one of six superspeedways to hold NASCAR races. The standard track at Daytona is a four-turn superspeedway that is 2.5 miles (4.0 km) long. The track also features two other layouts that utilize portions of the primary high speed tri-oval, such as a 3.56-mile (5.73 km) sports car course and a 2.95-mile (4.75 km) motorcycle course. The track's 180-acre (73 ha) infield includes the 29-acre (12 ha) Lake Lloyd, which has hosted powerboat racing. The speedway is owned and operated by International Speedway Corporation.

The track was built by NASCAR founder Bill France Sr. to host racing that was being held at the former Daytona Beach and Road Course and opened with the first Daytona 500 in 1959. The speedway has been renovated three times, with the infield renovated in 2004, and the track repaved in 1978 and 2010.

The Daytona 500 is regarded as the most important and prestigious race on the NASCAR calendar. It is also the series' first race of the year; this phenomenon is virtually unique in sports, which tend to have championships or other major events at the end of the season rather than the start. Since 1995, U.S. television ratings for the Daytona 500 have been the highest for any auto race of the year, surpassing the traditional leader, the Indianapolis 500 which in turn greatly surpasses the Daytona 500 in in-track attendance and international viewing. The 2006 Daytona 500 attracted the sixth largest average live global TV audience of any sporting event that year with 20 million viewers.

== Qualifying ==
Bobby Labonte won the pole position for the Daytona 500 with a time of 46.776 seconds, and his brother Terry qualified on the outside pole position next to him. Sterling Marlin qualified third winning the first Gatorade Twin 125 and Dale Earnhardt qualified fourth winning the second Twin 125.

== Race summary ==
=== Pre-race buildup ===
The race began with an emphasis on NASCAR's 50th Anniversary Celebration. The pre-race show on CBS featured some of the greatest Daytona 500 finishes in recent memory. It also detailed the famous Daytona Beach and Road Course and it featured Russ Truelove, Buck Baker, Tim Flock, Red Farmer and Junior Johnson on the Daytona Beach with one of Tim Flock's old "Full Jeweled" #300 Chryslers.

The Rev. Hal Marchman gave the traditional invocation, and country/bluegrass music singer Kathy Mattea sang the US National Anthem, but neither was aired on CBS. Kansas Governor Bill Graves and the fans in the stands all gave the command for drivers to start their engines and Pro Football Hall of Famer Dan Marino waved the green flag to start the race.

=== Caution #1 ===
In the mid-stage of the event, green flag pit stops were still in progress with Jeff Gordon leading and were on pace of breaking the average speed of 198. Ward Burton cut down a tire, leaving debris on the track. This would bring out the first caution.

=== Caution #2 ===
Late in the race with a possibility of a second round of green-flag stops, John Andretti and Robert Pressley made contact in turn 2 and both spun out, which brought out the second caution. During pit spots, Dale Earnhardt came out first, Michael Waltrip had a penalty after running over a hose while pitting, thus held back at the rear of the pack.

=== Caution #3 (Lap 198) and finish ===
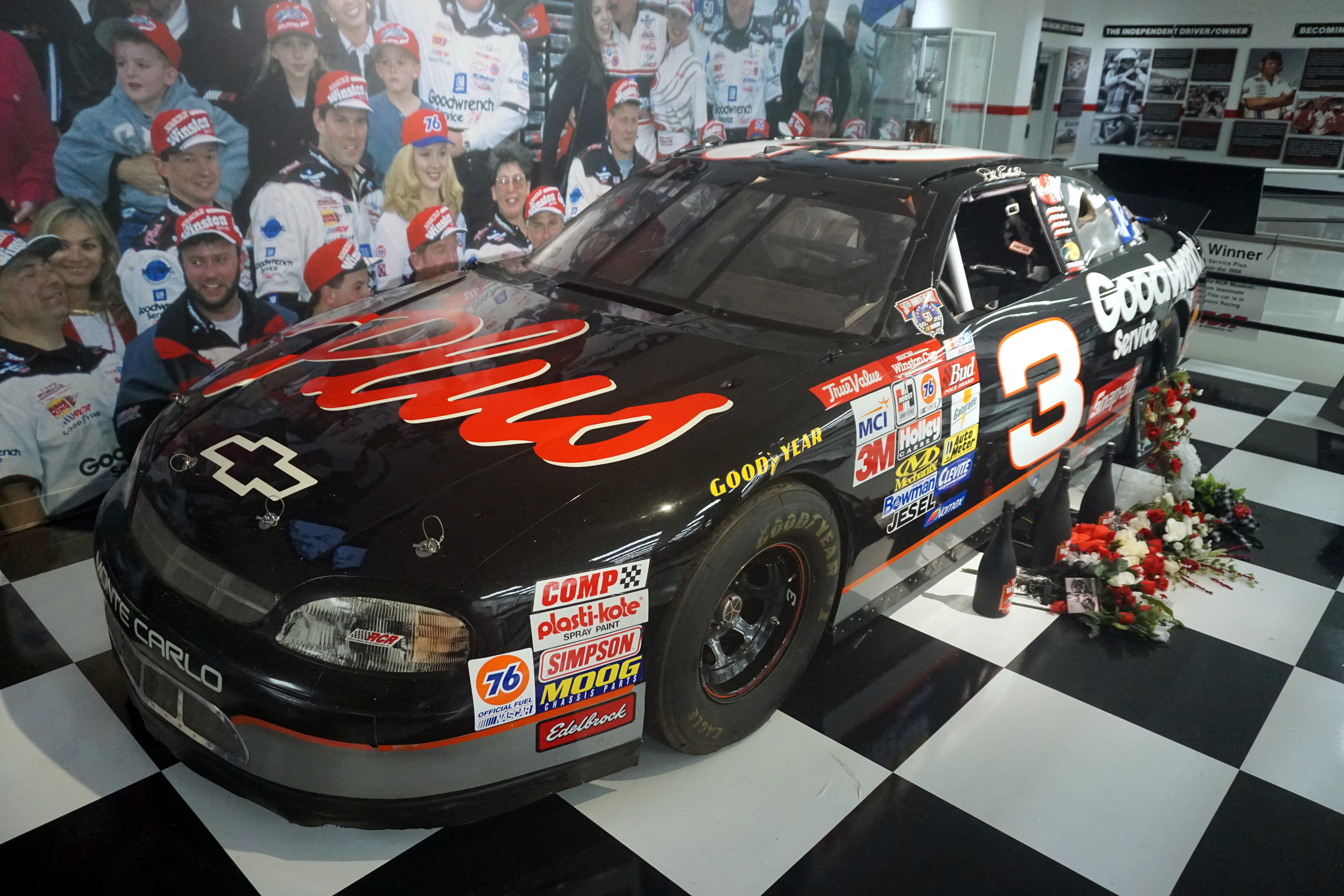
Dale Earnhardt's 1998 Daytona 500-winning No. 3 GM Goodwrench Plus Chevrolet Monte Carlo

Dale Earnhardt led Bobby Labonte and Jeremy Mayfield heading into turn 2. Lake Speed and John Andretti got together and both cars spun, setting up a scenario where Earnhardt, Labonte, and Mayfield were all in contention for the win. While racing back to the caution flag, the three came up on the lapped car of Rick Mast. Earnhardt easily passed Mast on the outside. Labonte lost Earnhardt's draft while Mayfield sped to the inside of Mast. Earnhardt led Labonte and Mayfield, who were side by side. Earnhardt took the white and yellow flags in first while Labonte edged Mayfield for second by a fender. The race would end under the caution flag. Earnhardt dedicated his win to his late colleague, Neil Bonnett, who died 4 years earlier whilst practicing for the 1994 race.

=== Results ===
Pos	Grid	Car	Driver	Team	Make	Laps	Laps led	Status
1	4	3	Dale Earnhardt	Richard Childress Racing	Chevrolet	200	107	Running
2	1	18	Bobby Labonte	Joe Gibbs Racing	Pontiac	200	22	Running
3	13	12	Jeremy Mayfield	Penske-Kranefuss Racing	Ford	200	0	Running
4	31	33	Ken Schrader	Andy Petree Racing	Chevrolet	200	0	Running
5	12	2	Rusty Wallace	Penske-Kranefuss Racing	Ford	200	4	Running
6	10	36	Ernie Irvan (W)	MB2 Motorsports	Pontiac	200	0	Running
7	21	97	Chad Little	Roush Racing	Ford	200	0	Running
8	8	31	Mike Skinner	Richard Childress Racing	Chevrolet	200	1	Running
9	6	21	Michael Waltrip	Wood Brothers Racing	Ford	200	0	Running
10	19	94	Bill Elliott (W)	Elliott-Marino Racing	Ford	200	0	Running
11	39	44	Kyle Petty	PE2 Motorsports	Pontiac	200	0	Running
12	22	4	Bobby Hamilton	Morgan-McClure Motorsports	Chevrolet	200	0	Running
13	2	5	Terry Labonte	Hendrick Motorsports	Chevrolet	200	2	Running
14	32	50	Ricky Craven	Hendrick Motorsports	Chevrolet	200	0	Running
15	7	23	Jimmy Spencer	Travis Carter Motorsports	Ford	200	0	Running
16	29	24	Jeff Gordon (W)	Hendrick Motorsports	Chevrolet	200	56	Running
17	16	9	Lake Speed	Melling Racing	Ford	200	0	Running
18	17	43	John Andretti	Petty Enterprises	Pontiac	200	0	Running
19	38	28	Kenny Irwin Jr. (R)	Robert Yates Racing	Ford	199	0	Flagged
20	37	16	Ted Musgrave	Roush Racing	Ford	199	0	Flagged
21	26	13	Jerry Nadeau (R)	Elliott-Marino Racing	Ford	199	0	Flagged
22	3	40	Sterling Marlin (W)	SABCO Racing	Chevrolet	199	2	Flagged
23	23	73	Mike Wallace	Barkdoll Racing	Chevrolet	199	0	Flagged
24	42	11	Brett Bodine	Scandia-Bodine Racing	Ford	199	0	Flagged
25	9	22	Ward Burton	Bill Davis Racing	Pontiac	199	0	Flagged
26	28	42	Joe Nemechek	SABCO Racing	Chevrolet	199	6	Flagged
27	34	90	Dick Trickle	Donlavey Racing	Ford	198	0	Flagged
28	41	41	Steve Grissom	Larry Hedrick Motorsports	Chevrolet	198	0	Flagged
29	18	95	Andy Hillenburg (R)	Sadler Brothers Racing	Chevrolet	198	0	Flagged
30	27	75	Rick Mast	Butch Mock Motorsports	Ford	197	0	Flagged
31	25	7	Geoff Bodine (W)	Mattei Bodine Racing	Ford	197	0	Flagged
32	30	77	Robert Pressley	Jasper Motorsports	Ford	197	0	Flagged
33	43	17	Darrell Waltrip (W)	Darrell Waltrip Motorsports	Chevrolet	196	0	Flagged
34	5	88	Dale Jarrett (W)	Robert Yates Racing	Ford	196	0	Flagged
35	36	47	Billy Standridge (R)	Standridge Auto Racing	Ford	196	0	Flagged
36	35	71	Dave Marcis	Marcis Auto Racing	Chevrolet	193	0	Flagged
37	11	30	Derrike Cope (W)	Bahari Racing	Pontiac	191	0	Flagged
38	15	6	Mark Martin	Roush Racing	Ford	187	0	Flagged
39	24	98	Greg Sacks	Cale Yarborough Motorsports	Ford	173	0	Flagged
40	14	99	Jeff Burton	Roush Racing	Ford	160	0	Engine
41	33	1	Steve Park (R)	Dale Earnhardt, Inc.	Chevrolet	158	0	Ignition
42	40	10	Ricky Rudd	Rudd Performance Motorsports	Ford	117	0	Ignition
43	20	91	Kevin Lepage (R)	LJ Racing	Chevrolet	78	0	Engine
Failed to Qualify
		46	Wally Dallenbach Jr.	SABCO Racing	Chevrolet			
		81	Kenny Wallace	FILMAR Racing	Ford			
		96	David Green (R)	American Equipment Racing	Chevrolet			
		78	Gary Bradberry (R)	Triad Motorsports	Ford			
		29	Jeff Green (R)	Diamond Ridge Motorsports	Chevrolet			
		79	Norm Benning (R)	T.R.I.X. Racing	Chevrolet			
		8	Hut Stricklin	Stavola Brothers Racing	Chevrolet			
		14	Loy Allen Jr.	Precision Products Racing	Pontiac			
		80	Mike Ciochetti (R)	Hover Motorsports	Ford			
		59	Mark Gibson (R)	CSG Motorsports	Ford			
		26	Johnny Benson	Roush Racing	Ford			
		35	Todd Bodine	ISM Racing	Pontiac			
		07	Dan Pardus (R)	Midwest Transit Racing	Chevrolet			
WD		85	Randy Renfrow (R)	Mansion Motorsports	Ford			

== See also ==
- 1998 in NASCAR

Previous race: 1997 NAPA 500	NASCAR Winston Cup Series; 1998 season	Next race: 1998 GM Goodwrench Service Plus 400
