= 2005 in NASCAR =

The following NASCAR national series were held in 2005:

- 2005 NASCAR Nextel Cup Series - The top racing series in NASCAR.
- 2005 NASCAR Busch Series - The second-highest racing series in NASCAR.
- 2005 NASCAR Craftsman Truck Series - The third-highest racing series in NASCAR.

Preceded by 2004 in NASCAR	NASCAR seasons 2005	Succeeded by 2006 in NASCAR
