= 2001 in NASCAR =

The following NASCAR national series were held in 2001:

- 2001 NASCAR Winston Cup Series - The top racing series in NASCAR
- 2001 NASCAR Busch Series - The second-highest racing series in NASCAR
- 2001 NASCAR Craftsman Truck Series - The third-highest racing series in NASCAR

Preceded by 2000 in NASCAR	NASCAR seasons 2001	Succeeded by 2002 in NASCAR
