= 2004 in NASCAR =

The following NASCAR national series were held in 2004:

- 2004 NASCAR Nextel Cup Series - The top racing series in NASCAR.
- 2004 NASCAR Busch Series - The second-highest racing series in NASCAR.
- 2004 NASCAR Craftsman Truck Series - The third-highest racing series in NASCAR.

Preceded by 2003 in NASCAR	NASCAR seasons 2004	Succeeded by 2005 in NASCAR
