= 1991 in NASCAR =

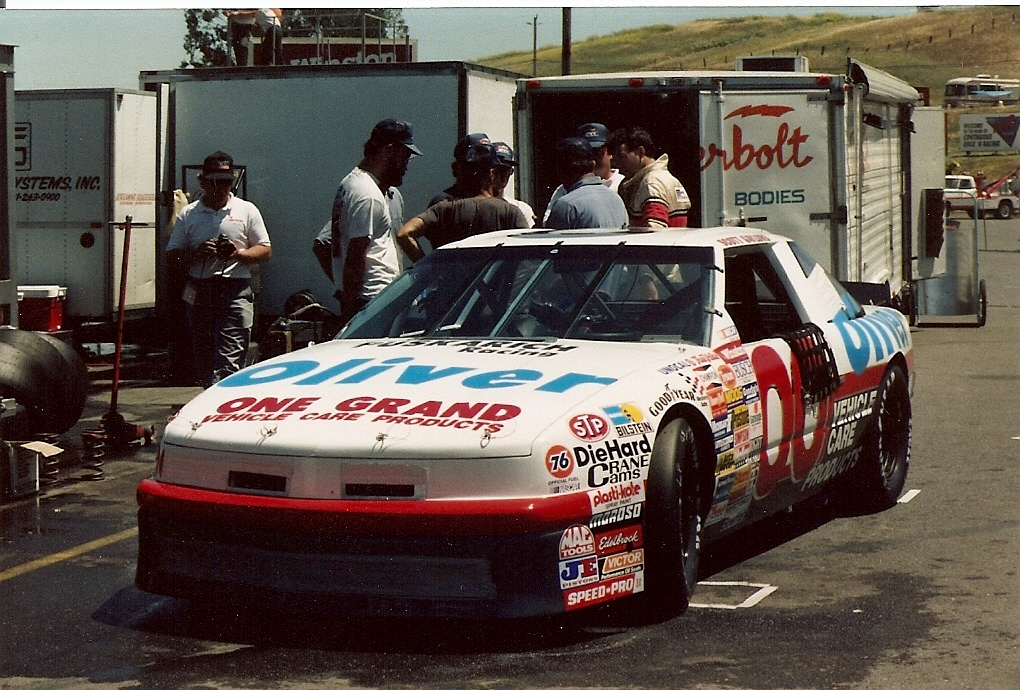
Scott Gaylord's car, Winston Cup race at Sears Point, 1991

The following NASCAR national series were held in 1991:

- 1991 NASCAR Winston Cup Series – The top racing series in NASCAR
- 1991 NASCAR Busch Series – The second-highest racing series in NASCAR

Preceded by 1990 in NASCAR	NASCAR seasons 1991	Succeeded by 1992 in NASCAR
