= 2002 in NASCAR =

The following NASCAR national series were held in 2002:

- 2002 NASCAR Winston Cup Series - The top racing series in NASCAR.
- 2002 NASCAR Busch Series - The second-highest racing series in NASCAR.
- 2002 NASCAR Craftsman Truck Series - The third-highest racing series in NASCAR.

Preceded by 2001 in NASCAR	NASCAR seasons 2002	Succeeded by 2003 in NASCAR
