= 1995 in NASCAR =

The following NASCAR national series were held in 1995:

- 1995 NASCAR Winston Cup Series - The top racing series in NASCAR.
- 1995 NASCAR Busch Series - The second-highest racing series in NASCAR.
- 1995 NASCAR SuperTruck Series - The third-highest racing series in NASCAR, for which 1995 was the debut season.

Preceded by 1994 in NASCAR	NASCAR seasons 1995	Succeeded by 1996 in NASCAR
