= 1997 in NASCAR =

The following NASCAR national series were held in 1997:

- 1997 NASCAR Winston Cup Series - The top racing series in NASCAR.
- 1997 NASCAR Busch Series - The second-highest racing series in NASCAR.
- 1997 NASCAR Craftsman Truck Series - The third-highest racing series in NASCAR.

Preceded by 1996 in NASCAR	NASCAR seasons 1997	Succeeded by 1998 in NASCAR
