= 1999 in NASCAR =

The following NASCAR national series were held in 1999:

- 1999 NASCAR Winston Cup Series - The top racing series in NASCAR.
- 1999 NASCAR Busch Series - The second-highest racing series in NASCAR.
- 1999 NASCAR Craftsman Truck Series - The third-highest racing series in NASCAR.

Preceded by 1998 in NASCAR	NASCAR seasons 1999	Succeeded by 2000 in NASCAR
