= 2000 in NASCAR =

The following NASCAR national series were held in 2000:

- 2000 NASCAR Winston Cup Series - The top racing series in NASCAR.
- 2000 NASCAR Busch Series - The second-highest racing series in NASCAR.
- 2000 NASCAR Craftsman Truck Series - The third-highest racing series in NASCAR.

| Preceded by 1999 in NASCAR | NASCAR seasons 2000 | Succeeded by 2001 in NASCAR |
