= 1998 in NASCAR =

The following NASCAR national series were held in 1998:

- 1998 NASCAR Winston Cup Series - The top racing series in NASCAR.
- 1998 NASCAR Busch Series - The second-highest racing series in NASCAR.
- 1998 NASCAR Craftsman Truck Series - The third-highest racing series in NASCAR.

| Preceded by 1997 in NASCAR | NASCAR seasons 1998 | Succeeded by 1999 in NASCAR |
