= Brickyard 400 =

Auto race held in Indianapolis, Indiana, US

NASCAR Cup Series
- Venue: Indianapolis Motor Speedway
- Location: Speedway, Indiana, United States
- Corporate sponsor: PPG Industries
- First race: 1994
- Distance: 400 mi (643.738 km)
- Laps: 160; Stages 1/2: 50 each Final stage: 60
- Previous names: Brickyard 400 (1994–2004, 2010, 2024–present); Allstate 400 at the Brickyard (2005–2009); Brickyard 400 presented by BigMachineRecords.com (2011); Crown Royal presents the Your Hero's Name Here 400 at the Brickyard powered by BigMachineRecords.com (2012–2014); Crown Royal presents the Your Hero's Name Here 400 at the Brickyard (2015–2016); Brantley Gilbert Big Machine Brickyard 400 (2017); Big Machine Vodka 400 (2018–2019); Big Machine Hand Sanitizer 400 Powered by Big Machine Records (2020)
- Most wins (driver): Jeff Gordon (5)
- Most wins (team): Hendrick Motorsports (11)
- Most wins (manufacturer): Chevrolet (18)

Circuit information
- Surface: Asphalt
- Length: 2.5 mi (4.0 km)
- Turns: 4

The Brickyard 400 (officially known as the Brickyard 400 presented by PPG for sponsorship reasons) is an annual NASCAR Cup Series points race held at the Indianapolis Motor Speedway in Speedway, Indiana, United States. The inaugural race was held in 1994 and was the first race other than the Indianapolis 500 to be held at the Indianapolis Motor Speedway since 1916. In its inaugural running, the Brickyard 400 became NASCAR's most-attended event, drawing an estimated crowd of more than 250,000 spectators. The race also paid one of NASCAR's highest purses. From 1994 to 2020, the race was held on the 2.5-mile oval, for a distance of 400 miles. The race was put on hiatus for three years (2021–2023) in favor of the Verizon 200 at the Brickyard which was run on the combined road course and run a distance of 200 miles. The event returned to the oval in 2024 season.

In most years since 1994, the event has traditionally been held on the last weekend of July or the first weekend of August. In 2018–2019, after schedule realignments, NASCAR moved the race to the weekend after Labor Day, where it served as the last race of the regular season. In 2020 only, it was held on Independence Day weekend.

The names of the winners of the Brickyard 400 are inscribed on the PPG Trophy, which is permanently housed at the Indianapolis Motor Speedway Museum. Jeff Gordon won the inaugural Brickyard 400 on August 6, 1994. He is the most-successful driver in the history of the race, with a record five victories and three pole positions. Gordon also holds the most laps completed, most laps led, and most earnings in the race. Hendrick Motorsports is the most successful team with 11 total wins and five poles. Corey Heim is the defending race winner.

== Race origins ==
=== Early years ===
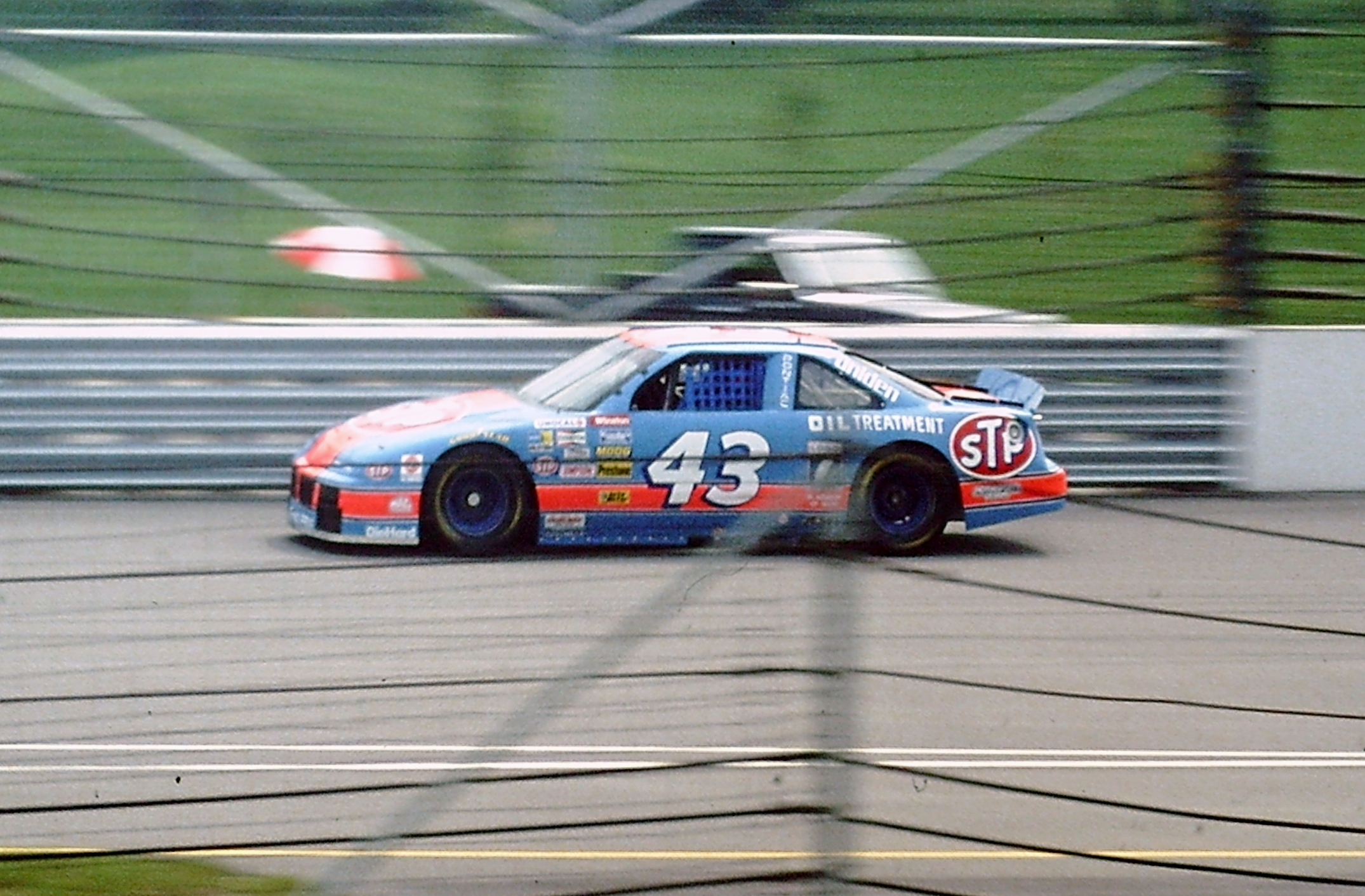
Richard Petty during the Open Test in 1993.

The Indianapolis Motor Speedway opened in 1909, and the first Indianapolis 500 was held in 1911. After initially hosting multiple race meets in 1909–1910, it became a tradition that the Indianapolis 500 would be the only race held at the track annually. With the exception of a race meet the weekend after Labor Day in 1916, no other races were held at the track through 1993. As the NASCAR Winston Cup Series began to grow in stature and popularity, speculation began to grow in the 1980s and early 1990s about the possibility of holding a race at Indy. From 1971 to 1980, NASCAR held races at Ontario Motor Speedway, which was built as a replica of Indianapolis. With their experiences at Ontario, it was generally presumed that the stock cars would find Indy's nearly identical layout equally competitive. In the mid-to-late 1960s, stock car racing slowly began to develop a following in Indiana, with the introduction of the USAC Stock Car Yankee 300 at Indianapolis Raceway Park and the State Fair Century at the Fairgrounds. Later, the Kroger 200 at the IRP oval became a popular stop on the NASCAR Busch Series. In October 1969, Pete Hamilton and Roger McCluskey took part in a stock car tire test at the Indianapolis Motor Speedway. They drove Camaros from the Grand American "pony car" series over two days, with a top lap of 147.4 mph. Officials insisted, however, that the test was not for a race at Indy, but instead an evaluation of how the cars might perform at Ontario.

During the reigns of Tony Hulman (1946–1977) and subsequent Speedway presidents John Cooper (1980–1982), and Joe Cloutier (1978–1979, 1983–1989), the idea of hosting a second race at the Speedway was considered from time to time, but never seriously pursued by the board of directors. Cooper had talks with NASCAR, but Cloutier in particular, seemed the most resistant. Not only was tradition and fan interest an issue, but logistical scheduling issues were also obstacles. The congested and aging Gasoline Alley garage area, narrow pit lane, existing retaining walls and catch fences were considered insufficient for the large, heavy stock cars, thus significant capital improvements would be required to properly host NASCAR. Cloutier wanted to assure that a second race at the Speedway would outdraw Indianapolis 500 time trials, otherwise it would not make financial sense.

Around 1969, USAC proposed a race at the Indianapolis Motor Speedway for the USAC Stock Car division. It was to be called the "Tony Hulman Classic", but Hulman and the Speedway management declined the offer. The race would have had to have been held in the autumn, since all desirable summer dates were already taken. For instance, the July 4 weekend was already taken by the Firecracker 400, which would have prevented any NASCAR stars from crossing over to participate; plus several USAC regulars were known to pick up rides for Daytona. Labor Day weekend was already crowded with the USAC California 500 at Ontario, the NASCAR Southern 500 at Darlington, and the NHRA U.S. Nationals at nearby IRP. No progress towards scheduling a stock car race, whether USAC or NASCAR, was ever taken before Tony Hulman died in 1977.

In 1980, due to a tax dispute with the City of Daytona Beach and Volusia County, Bill France Sr. openly threatened to move the NASCAR Firecracker 400 to the Indianapolis Motor Speedway. A few weeks later, however, the parties reconciled, and the plan to move the race was withdrawn.

In the summer of 1979, during the first USAC/CART Split, a proposal was made to hold a second race at the Indianapolis Motor Speedway. After the California 500 switched alliances mid-season to become a CART series race, USAC proposed a Labor Day weekend race meet that would consist of a USAC Stock Car/Championship Car doubleheader. A 250-mile stock car race on Saturday would be followed by a 250-mile Indycar race on Sunday. However, the plan never materialized. One of the issues noted was a potential conflict with the NHRA U.S. Nationals at nearby IRP. Even still, rumors of a late-summer stock car race persisted for another year or so. Speculation grew after Ontario Motor Speedway closed and opened up a date on the NASCAR schedule. In early 1982, then-Speedway president John Cooper was said to have made a 'hand-shake' deal with Bill France Sr. for a race, but it was vetoed by Mary F. Hulman. Cooper subsequently resigned, saying the details had never really been ironed out, and talks about a stock car race at Indy cooled for the next several years.

Though no stock car races had ever been held, the Speedway did occasionally see stock car testing and endurance runs. In 1956, Ford set a 500-mile stock car record, and in 1956, the Nichels Engineering Endurance Run was held. A. J. Foyt was known to have used his garage at Indy to store race cars during the summer months, and in 1979 was said to have taken his NASCAR stock car for test laps.

When Joe Cloutier died in December 1989, Tony George was named the president of the Speedway. Upon his appointment, George immediately began taking the Speedway in new business directions. However, at first, he was cautious and tentative about the idea of a NASCAR race at the Speedway.

=== 1990s ===
On September 24, 1991, A. J. Foyt filmed a commercial for Craftsman tools at the Indianapolis Motor Speedway. While filming in the garage area, Foyt, and Speedway president Tony George decided to take Foyt's NASCAR Winston Cup Series stock car for a few laps around the track. Foyt was the first driver to do so, and later on, George himself took a few laps. The event was not planned, and had no implications, but was an unusual sight, and stirred up some mild interest and speculation for the future.

In December 1991, Tony George proposed to the board of directors a plan to hold a second major event at the Speedway. The board approved the measure, and the Speedway started taking steps towards hosting a second race, preferably a NASCAR Winston Cup event, but also considering IROC. An idea was also proposed for an "all-star" exhibition event involving former winners racing stock cars on Carburetion Day.

In March 1992, NASCAR drivers Dave Marcis, Jim Sauter, and Dick Trickle (all of whom were IROC test drivers) were invited to test IROC cars at the Speedway. Trickle reportedly ran a lap that was hand–timed at 153 mph (246 km/h). At the time, the Speedway was considering hosting an IROC event during May as part of the on-track activities leading up the Indianapolis 500. The second weekend of Indy 500 qualifying was becoming less-popular with fans, and an additional event was an idea to boost attendance. The test was considered successful, but several improvements would have to be made to the track before it was safe for the IROC cars to race there. After much consideration, it was determined that it would not be economically feasible to hold the IROC race. Plans for that event were put on hold. Instead, nine top NASCAR teams were invited to test (see below).

On June 22–23, 1992, nine top NASCAR Winston Cup series teams were invited to Indianapolis to participate in a Goodyear tire test. Over the weekend, the teams had raced in the Miller Genuine Draft 400 at Michigan International Speedway. Although no official announcements were made, it was in fact an unofficial compatibility test to see if stock cars would be competitive at the circuit. An estimated 10,000 spectators watched two days of history in the making. A. J. Foyt took a few laps around the track in Dale Earnhardt's car on the second day.

Following the test, the Indianapolis Motor Speedway started an extensive improvement project. The outside retaining wall and catch fence were replaced. The new wall and fence were decidedly stronger, and could support the 3,500 pound NASCAR stock cars. The pit area was widened, and the individual pit stalls were replaced in concrete. This was done to better support the pneumatic jacks used by the Indy cars, and to handle the refuel spillage of gasoline from the NASCAR machines. The largest project, however, involved the removal of the track apron, and the construction of the new warm-up lane, similar to that built at Nazareth Speedway in 1987. The Gasoline Alley garage area had already been rebuilt in 1986, and it was said to have been designed to accommodate stock cars if and when a race were ever to materialize.

On April 14, 1993, Speedway President Tony George, and the president of NASCAR, Bill France Jr. jointly announced the Inaugural Brickyard 400 would be held Saturday August 6, 1994. A new race logo was also unveiled. The initial contract was for two seasons, but the race was expected to return in perpetuity.

On August 16–17 the same year, thirty-five NASCAR teams took part in an open test at the Speedway. It was held as the teams returned from the second race at Michigan, the Champion Spark Plug 400. The top 35 teams in NASCAR points received invitations. Hosting the test in August mimicked the weather conditions expected for the race in 1994. Several thousand spectators attended, and many announcements were made. NASCAR legend Richard Petty, who had retired from competition the previous November, took four laps himself, then donated his car to the Speedway museum.

== Race details ==
For its first running in 1994, the race was slated for a Saturday afternoon at 1:15 pm EDT, on August 6. At the time the first weekend of August was open on the NASCAR schedule. Since the race was not being held on a holiday weekend, track officials decided to observe Sunday as a makeup date in case of rain on Saturday. In 1994, practice and pole qualifying was held on Thursday. Practice, second round qualifying, and "Happy Hour" final practice were scheduled for Friday. In addition, during the first year, a special "pacing" practice was held where the field followed behind the pace car to measure pit road speed.

Starting in 1995, an additional practice session was scheduled for Wednesday afternoon. Pole qualifying was still held Thursday, and second round qualifying was held Friday. This schedule continued through 2000.

From 1998 to 2003, an IROC event was situated in the schedule. The IROC race would be held the day before the Brickyard 400.

Starting in 2001, the race was moved to Sunday. In addition, NASCAR eliminated second-round qualification. The schedule was compressed so practice was held Friday, and the single pole qualifying round was held Saturday. "Happy hour" final practice was also held Saturday. This schedule differed from typical NASCAR weekend schedules, which normally saw practice and pole qualification on Fridays. Moving the pole qualification to Saturday allowed for a potential larger audience, and also opened the schedule up for the Kroger 200 held at nearby Indianapolis Raceway Park.

In 2007, coinciding with ESPN taking over NASCAR television rights, the race swapped dates with Pocono. The Brickyard 400 moved to the last weekend in July, and Pocono to the first weekend in August.

=== Attendance ===
At the onset, the Brickyard 400 saw some of the largest crowds in NASCAR history. The first running in 1994 saw a sold-out record crowd of over 250,000 spectators. Track officials claimed to have received requests for tickets three to four times what they could fulfill, and had to resort to a lottery system to distribute tickets. In an effort to prevent the Brickyard 400 from upstaging the Indianapolis 500 in gate attendance, some bleacher seating was removed for the 400, and infield general admission was not offered for the first several years. In addition, some infield bleachers were dismantled and infield grass mound seating was closed off to spectators for the first couple of years for safety reasons. It was determined that the inside fences and guardrails that existed at the time were not sufficiently robust for the 3,500-pound stock cars. In 1996, a new concrete wall and catch fence was built along the inside of the backstretch, and the grass mounds were reopened to spectators.

After a tire controversy at the 2008 race, subsequent attendance began to sharply decline at the 400. Other factors that have been cited include poor sightlines compared to other NASCAR tracks, the overall lack of competition, and uncomfortably hot summer temperatures in July/August. In addition, following the change from a track-organized television contract (1994–2000) to a centralized NASCAR television package (since 2001), the local television blackout the Speedway imposed was lifted. The circuit has been criticized for being poorly-suited for stock cars prompting some fans to choose other tracks. The subsequent addition of new races within a 160-mile radius, spaced only weeks apart at Chicagoland and Kentucky, gave fans other options. The 2016 race saw fewer than 50,000 people in attendance, leaving nearly 200,000 empty seats. In 2020, due to the COVID-19 pandemic, the race was held without spectators.

Attendance at the 2024 race exceeded 70,000 spectators. This was greater than the most recent races on the oval (2018–2019), and more than the 60,000 in attendance for the three road course races (2021–2023). Additionally, it marked the first year-over-year attendance growth for the Brickyard 400 since 2002. The attendance in 2025 was about the same, reported to be "just under" 70,000 and "down a couple thousand" from 2024.

=== Super Weekend ===
In 2012, the Brickyard 400 became part of Super Weekend at the Brickyard, consisting of four days of racing on both the oval and the road course. The WeatherTech SportsCar Championship (formerly Grand Am) utilized the road course on Friday for the Brickyard Grand Prix along with the Brickyard Sports Car Challenge for the Continental Tire SportsCar Challenge series. The NASCAR Xfinity Series left IRP and moved to Indy for the Indiana 250. The Brickyard 400 continued to headline on Sunday.

After low attendance, the road course races were removed from the schedule after 2014. By 2016, with races only on the oval for the Xfinity and Cup Series, the "Super Weekend" moniker was dropped. The IMSA races were reinstated as the IMSA Battle on the Bricks in 2023, as its own September date as a standard 3-hour race (2 hours, 40 minutes of racing) except in 2025, when it was a six-hour race, which since then has served as one of five major weekends (the SVRA Father's Day race meeting and the Indianapolis 8 Hours are the other two).

=== Realignment ===
NASCAR realigned the three Midwestern races for the 2018 schedule, so that Chicagoland and Kentucky would be held two weeks apart in July, while Indianapolis moved to September, on a date historically known for the Harvest Auto Racing Classic in 1916. Distanced on the calendar from the other nearby races, and serving as the important final race before the NASCAR playoffs, race organizers looked for a boost in attendance. The expectations are that it will be conducted in cooler weather, and with the crowning of the regular season champion, and the last chance for prospective drivers to make the 16-driver playoff field, there is anticipation for renewed interest in the event. In 2018, however, rain moved through the area, completely washing out practice and qualifying, and postponed the race until Monday. Roughly 15,000-20,000 spectators were in attendance for Monday. The 400 also brought along a brand-new race, the Bryan Clauson Classic, a United States Auto Club Midget Car Championship event, on a new dirt track built in the infield near Turn 3.

The events expanded the 400 to a five-day event, with the Midgets racing on Wednesday and Thursday before the Friday-Sunday events of the NASCAR series. The Bryan Clauson Classic features two events, the 25-lap Stoops Pursuit and the 39-lap Driven2SaveLives BC39. The 2018 race featured a field of 118 cars. The Pursuit features all heat race winners and the drivers with the most passing points among non-winners in a 25-lap race where drivers must pass other cars or be eliminated at the end of each of the first four segments. After four five-lap segments, the remaining drivers will participate in a five-lap race for the win. The 39-lap Clauson event, named for an organ donor charity in Clauson's memory, features heat races and last-chance races similar to the Chili Bowl in its format. Those with the most passing points advance to the feature, while others must race their way in through preliminary night races.

In 2020, the Brickyard 400 was scheduled for Independence Day weekend, part of substantial changes to the NASCAR calendar. After only two seasons as the final race of the NASCAR regular season, the race will move back to mid-summer. The Coke Zero 400 at Daytona International Speedway took the slot as the final race before the NASCAR playoffs. The Brickyard 400 took the July 4 weekend slot the Coke Zero 400 traditionally utilized since 1959, which originally was designed to have been a USAC Indycar race at Daytona but was cancelled after the death of George Amick in a 100-mile Indycar race at Daytona earlier in the year.

Due to scheduling changes for its season resulting from the COVID-19 pandemic, the IndyCar Series announced that it would move its GMR Grand Prix — a road course race normally held prior to the 500 — to the Brickyard 400 weekend. It will join the Xfinity Series race (which will also move to the road course for the 2020 season) as part of a rare double-header on July 4. Tony Stewart envisioned the theoretical possibility of pulling quadruple duty for the Clauson Classic, IndyCar, and NASCAR events in the same weekend. However, the pandemic caused the Clauson Classic to be cancelled.

Starting in 2021, IMS dropped the race in favor of using the road course configuration of the speedway for NASCAR events. As a result, the July 4 weekend spot it held was occupied by Road America and the race was changed to the Verizon 200 at the Brickyard.

=== Naming rights ===
From 2005 to 2009, the race was known as the Allstate 400 at the Brickyard under a naming rights arrangement with Allstate. From 2012 to 2016, Crown Royal was the title sponsor of the race; under its sponsorship, the race honored a military member or first responder selected by fans, who received VIP tickets to the event, and their name included in the title of the race. From 2011 to 2014, the country music record label Big Machine Records was the presenting sponsor, and it became the title sponsor beginning in 2017. After co-branding the event with Big Machine-signed artist Brantley Gilbert in 2017, subsequent races have had Big Machine's Big Machine Vodka, as the sponsor. The 2020 race was known as the Big Machine Hand Sanitizer 400 at the Brickyard. When the race moved to the road course for 2021, Verizon assumed naming rights.

== Race recaps ==
=== 1994–1999 ===
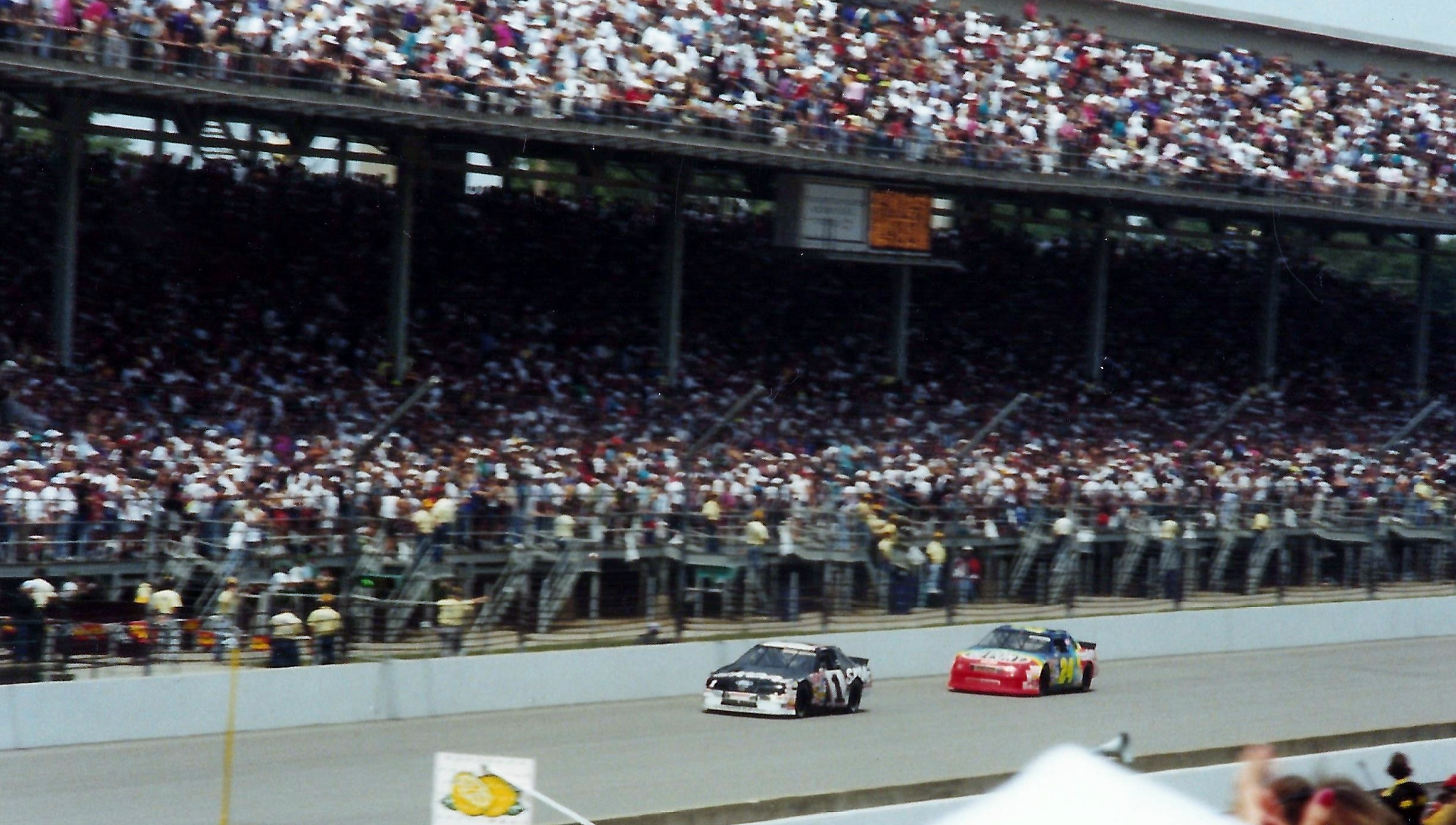
Jeff Gordon (No. 24) following Rick Mast (No. 1) at the 1994 Brickyard 400.

1994: The first running of the Brickyard 400 in 1994 saw the largest crowd to date to witness a NASCAR event, and the single largest race purse to date. Rick Mast won the pole position, and became the first stock car driver to lead a lap at Indy. Young second-year driver Jeff Gordon took the lead late in the race after Ernie Irvan suffered a flat tire. Gordon drove on to a historic win in NASCAR's debut at Indy. In an effort to attract more entries, the event was concurrently included on the NASCAR Winston West schedule. No Winston West competitors qualified on speed, but point leader Mike Chase made the field via a Winston West provisional. Gordon's inaugural Brickyard 400 winning car (nicknamed "Booger") is on display at the Hendrick Motorsports museum.

1995: Second-round qualification was rained out on Friday, and only a short "happy hour" practice followed. On Saturday, rain delayed the start of the race until late in the afternoon. Dale Earnhardt cruised to victory, in a race that was slowed only once for four laps under yellow. Rusty Wallace and Dale Jarrett battled close over the final 20 laps for second, with Wallace holding off the challenge.

1996: Dale Jarrett and his Robert Yates Racing crew began the tradition of the winning driver and crew kissing the row of bricks at the start-finish line, which has carried over to the Indianapolis 500. The race saw several blown tires after the speedway removed some rumble strips from the apron of the corners; Kyle Petty was injured when he blew a tire, slammed into the outside and inside wall off turn four, and was T-boned by Sterling Marlin. Johnny Benson led the most laps (70), but faded to 8th at the finish. Jarrett became the first driver to win both the Daytona 500 and Brickyard 400 in the same year. After injuries suffered at Talladega, defending race winner Dale Earnhardt was relieved by Mike Skinner on lap 7, who drove to a 15th-place finish.

1997: In the final twenty laps, Dale Jarrett, Jeff Gordon, and Mark Martin held the top three spots, but none of the three would be able to make it to the finish without one final pit stop for fuel. Jeff Burton and Ricky Rudd also were close on fuel. On lap 145, Robby Gordon brushed the wall, and Burton ran over debris. Burton was forced to pit under green, but as he was finishing his stop, the caution came out. Burton flew out of the pits to beat the leaders, and for a moment it appeared he was in the cat bird's seat with four fresh tires, and would be the leader after all other drivers cycled through their stops. However, he was penalized for speeding while exiting the pit lane, and dropped to 15th. Ricky Rudd was among a few drivers who stayed out, and his gamble put him in the lead. Rudd drove the final 46 laps without a pit stop to take the victory, and is to-date, the only owner/driver ever to win the Brickyard 400.

1998: Jeff Gordon became the first repeat winner, holding off Mark Martin for the win. Dale Jarrett dominated the second 100 miles of the race but lost his chance near the halfway point when he ran out of fuel, and coasted back to the pits; he lost four laps but made them up due to numerous cautions. Gordon's victory was the first in the Winston No Bull 5 program.

1999: Late in the race, Dale Jarrett leads, but fourth-place Bobby Labonte is the only car in the top five that can go the distance without pitting for fuel. A caution comes out with 17 laps to go, allowing the leaders to pit, foiling Labonte's chances to steal the win. As the leaders pitted, in an unexpected move, Dale Jarrett took on only two tires. Jeff Burton saw this and pulled away after taking only two tires. His pit crew, however, had already tried to loosen the lug nuts on the left side. Jarrett led the rest of the way, becomes the second two-time winner, and erases his heartbreak from 1998.

=== 2000s ===
2000: Rusty Wallace led 114 laps, and was leading late in the race when Bobby Labonte charged down the backstretch. Labonte took the lead at the stripe, and pulled away for the win. The race was slowed by only 2 cautions for 7 laps.

2001: With 25 laps to go, Jeff Gordon passed Sterling Marlin on a restart, and pulled away for the win. Gordon became the first 3-time winner of the Brickyard 400.

2002: Kurt Busch and Jimmy Spencer, locked in a burgeoning feud dating back to Bristol, collided on lap 36. Busch hit the turn 3 wall. Veteran Bill Elliott added the Brickyard to his long resume, and Rusty Wallace finished second for the third time.

2003: With 16 laps to go, Kevin Harvick used lap traffic to get by Matt Kenseth on a restart. A huge pileup occurred in turn three, and Harvick held off over the final ten laps to become the first driver to win the race from the pole position.

2004: For the first time in NASCAR Cup Series history, the green–white–checkered finish rule caused a race to be extended, in this case for one additional lap. On the extra lap, Casey Mears blew a tire, Ricky Rudd hit the wall, then Mark Martin and Dale Earnhardt Jr. suffered tire failures. Jeff Gordon retained the lead to become the first four-time winner of the Brickyard. Gordon joined A. J. Foyt, Al Unser Sr., and Rick Mears as four-time winners at Indianapolis.

2005: Hometown favorite Tony Stewart won his first race at Indianapolis Motor Speedway, and climbed the catch fence to celebrate, in the same fashion as Hélio Castroneves.

2006: After suffering a blown front left tire early in the race that caused some fender damage, Jimmie Johnson passed Dale Earnhardt Jr. with six laps left to win at Indy for the first time and became only the second driver to win both the Daytona 500 and Brickyard 400 in the same year. The first was Dale Jarrett in 1996.

2007: Juan Pablo Montoya became the first (and, to date, only) driver to race in all three of the major events hosted by the Indianapolis Motor Speedway (Indy 500, Brickyard 400, and the U.S.G.P.). Montoya, a rookie in the NASCAR Cup Series, finished second to Tony Stewart. Stewart's 2007 winning car is owned and on rotating display at the Speedway museum.

2008: The Car of Tomorrow was used at Indy for the first time. The Goodyear tires suffered bad wear patterns, causing blowouts in some cases after only ten laps of green-flag racing. Lengthy competition cautions were put out at roughly 10-lap intervals for teams to change tires, which caused controversy and angered fans and media. Jimmie Johnson managed to tame the tire problems by winning for the second time in his career at Indy, holding off a mild challenge from Carl Edwards.

2009: Former Indy 500 winner Juan Pablo Montoya dominated most of the race, leading 116 laps. However, with 35 laps to go, Montoya was penalized (not without protest and a heated rant) for speeding in the pits. The infraction left Jimmie Johnson holding off polesitter Mark Martin for the victory. Johnson became the second three-time winner, and the first back–to–back winner of the Brickyard 400.

=== 2010s ===
2010: 2000 Indianapolis 500 winner Juan Pablo Montoya dominated most of the race for the second year in a row, leading a total of 86 laps. However, he gave up the lead when he took 4 tires in a late pit stop. He would restart 7th with 18 laps to go and was unable to recover. Montoya crashed with 16 to go and before the caution came out, Kevin Harvick had passed Jamie McMurray for the lead. On the final restart, McMurray passed Harvick to go on to win the 400. This made him become the third driver to win the Daytona 500 and the Brickyard 400 during the same season, following Dale Jarrett in 1996 and Jimmie Johnson in 2006. McMurray's win also gave his team owner Chip Ganassi wins in the Daytona 500, the Indianapolis 500, and the Brickyard 400 all in the same season, making him the first team owner to do so.

2011: The final caution came out on lap 121 with Brad Keselowski out in front. With 39 laps to go, it would be difficult for the leaders to make it to the finish on fuel if they pit under the yellow. Since race laps at Indy are in the 51-second range, and a pit stop (including entering and exiting the pit lane) takes upwards of 40–45 seconds, green flag pits stops are not necessarily discouraged, unlike other circuits. Among the drivers who pitted on lap 123 was Paul Menard. After the green came back out, Jeff Gordon pitted on lap 134. As the leaders shuffled through their final pit stops, Menard took over the lead on lap 145. Meanwhile, Gordon, with two new tires, dramatically began charging through the field and was quickly in the top ten before moving up to 2nd position on lap 158. With now less than two laps to go, Menard stretched his fuel and held off Gordon on the last lap to score his first career Cup victory. Menard is the only driver to-date to have scored his first career Cup Series win at the Brickyard.

2012: The final caution came out on lap 130 with Jimmie Johnson leading. Over the final 20 laps, Johnson held off Kyle Busch and Greg Biffle to tie Jeff Gordon with four Brickyard 400 victories. Along with Gordon in NASCAR, Johnson also joined A. J. Foyt, Al Unser Sr., and Rick Mears as the only 4-time winners in the entire history of Indianapolis

2013: During his final pit stop, Jimmie Johnson took on four tires when a lug nut broke loose. His stop lasted 17.4 seconds. Ryan Newman pitted a lap later. Aware of Johnson's struggles, Newman took on two tires. Newman emerged with a 7-second lead over Johnson with 16 laps to go. Johnson closed to within 2 seconds, but fell short as Newman held on for the victory.

2014: The race was served as its last air with ESPN, With 17 laps to go, Jeff Gordon passed Kasey Kahne on a restart on the outside of turn one to take the lead for the final time. Twenty years after winning the inaugural Brickyard 400, Gordon won the race for a record 5th time.

2015: The race was first aired on NBCSN. Kyle Busch won his first Brickyard 400, holding off Joey Logano in a green–white–checkered finish. Busch swept the weekend, winning also the Xfinity race on Saturday. Attention for the weekend was focused heavily on a new "high-drag" aerodynamic rules package implemented to improve competition. Jeff Gordon, racing for the final time at the Brickyard, was involved in a spin on lap 50, brushed the wall, and placed 42nd. With Logano's second place, Team Penske – still winless in the Brickyard 400 – finished 2nd for the fourth time.

2016: Jeff Gordon came from retirement to fill in for Dale Earnhardt Jr., who was recovering from a concussion, Kyle Busch won his second Brickyard 400, holding off the field in overtime and also winning the Xfinity race for a second year in a row.

2017: In the first Brickyard 400 to include stage racing, the first two stages were dominated by Kyle Busch. However, he was involved in an accident with Martin Truex Jr. on lap 111 following a restart that took out both cars. During the final stage, darkness began to become a factor following a red flag for rain early in the race, and two additional red flags for cleaning up following multiple wrecks. It appeared that Trevor Bayne, who was gambling on fuel mileage, was headed for his second career Cup Series win; but a caution came out at lap 150 that foiled his plan. Kasey Kahne had just pitted for fresh tires and fuel moments before the caution came out, and used that to take the lead after everyone else pitted. Kahne was able to stay in front for the first attempt at a restart finish, but was overtaken by Brad Keselowski on the second of these restarts. The caution came out again for Bayne and others crashing on the frontstretch. This brought another restart, but with Keselowski as the control car and Kahne second. Kahne amazingly managed to outrun Keselowski into the first corner and down the backstretch, and took the victory in overtime for his first win since 2014 when the caution came out yet again, this time for Denny Hamlin spinning into the wall, but as they had crossed the overtime line at the end of the straight, the race was finalized under yellow. This was the tenth victory for Hendrick Motorsports in the Brickyard 400. The race was the longest running event at Indianapolis Motor Speedway since the 1913 Indianapolis 500 due to rain delays, red flags, and crashes that causes the lengthening of the race.

2018: Rain washed out all practice and qualifying, postponing the race until Monday. Points leader Kyle Busch started on the pole, and the field of forty cars took the green flag without having turned a single practice lap. On fresher tires, Brad Keselowski passed second place Clint Bowyer on a restart with three laps to go. With less than two laps to go Keselowski caught Denny Hamlin, going side by side down the backstretch and into turn three. Keselowski took the lead coming off of turn four, and won the first Brickyard 400 for Penske Racing.

2019: A new format saw qualifying on Sunday morning, with the race held Sunday afternoon, and Kevin Harvick won the pole. Kyle Busch, who had already clinched the regular season title the previous week at Darlington, looked strong early on, but lost his engine just beyond the halfway point. Brad Keselowski was running in the top ten when Erik Jones dove hard to the inside causing both to hit the wall, with Keselowski hitting a tire barrier off of turn two landing almost on the passenger side. Jimmie Johnson failed to make the Playoffs for the first time in his career after crashing late in the race. Harvick led 118 of the 160 laps to take the win. Bubba Wallace, driving for Richard Petty Motorsports, finished third, his second career top five finish. Most of the field suffered significant damage due to collisions on pit road early on in the race. After the race, Harvick and his owner Tony Stewart climbed the fence. It was Harvick's second win, and Stewart's fourth victory at the event (twice as a driver, and twice as an owner).

=== 2020s ===
2020: For 2020, the race was moved to July 4th weekend. Due to the COVID-19 pandemic, the race was held without spectators. Furthermore, the event became a doubleheader weekend. The IndyCar Series GMR Grand Prix and the Pennzoil 150 for the Xfinity Series were held on the combined road course on Saturday, with the Brickyard 400 on the oval on Sunday. The start of the race was delayed about an hour due to lightning in the area, then a crash in the pits brought out a red flag on lap 17. In the final stage, Denny Hamlin led Kevin Harvick and Matt Kenseth. In the closing laps, Hamlin's tires were starting to go away. With six laps to go, Hamlin's right front tire went down going into turn one, sending him hard into the outside wall. That set up an overtime finish between Harvick and Kenseth. Harvick got the jump on the restart, and cruised to victory, his third overall in the 400. Harvick also became the third driver to win the 400 in back-to-back years. The Bryan Clauson Classic was cancelled because of pandemic restrictions.

2024: After a three-year hiatus (during which time the race was replaced by the Verizon 200 on the road course), the Brickyard 400 returned to the oval. The 2024 race marked the 30th anniversary of the inaugural running in 1994. Kyle Larson, who had attempted Double Duty earlier in the year, drove to victory. Larson grabbed the lead from Ryan Blaney on an overtime restart. Brad Keselowski had been leading the race, but ran out of fuel, and was forced to duck into the pits as the field was approaching the overtime restart. The Speedway also engraved Verizon 200 winners on the PPG Trophy, and it was the first since 2017 to feature the classic brick trophy that was abandoned in 2018.

2025: The Brickyard 400 was the fifth and final race of the inaugural NASCAR In-Season Challenge. Contested over 168 laps, extended from 160 laps due to an overtime finish, Bubba Wallace would hold off defending race winner Kyle Larson to win his first Crown Jewel. Indiana-native Chase Briscoe started on pole, and winning stage one while Ryan Blaney won stage two. Austin Cindric led the most laps, with 40 and was the favorite before blowing a tire while leading, handing the lead to his teammate Joey Logano, who would also blow one meanwhile.

== Past winners ==
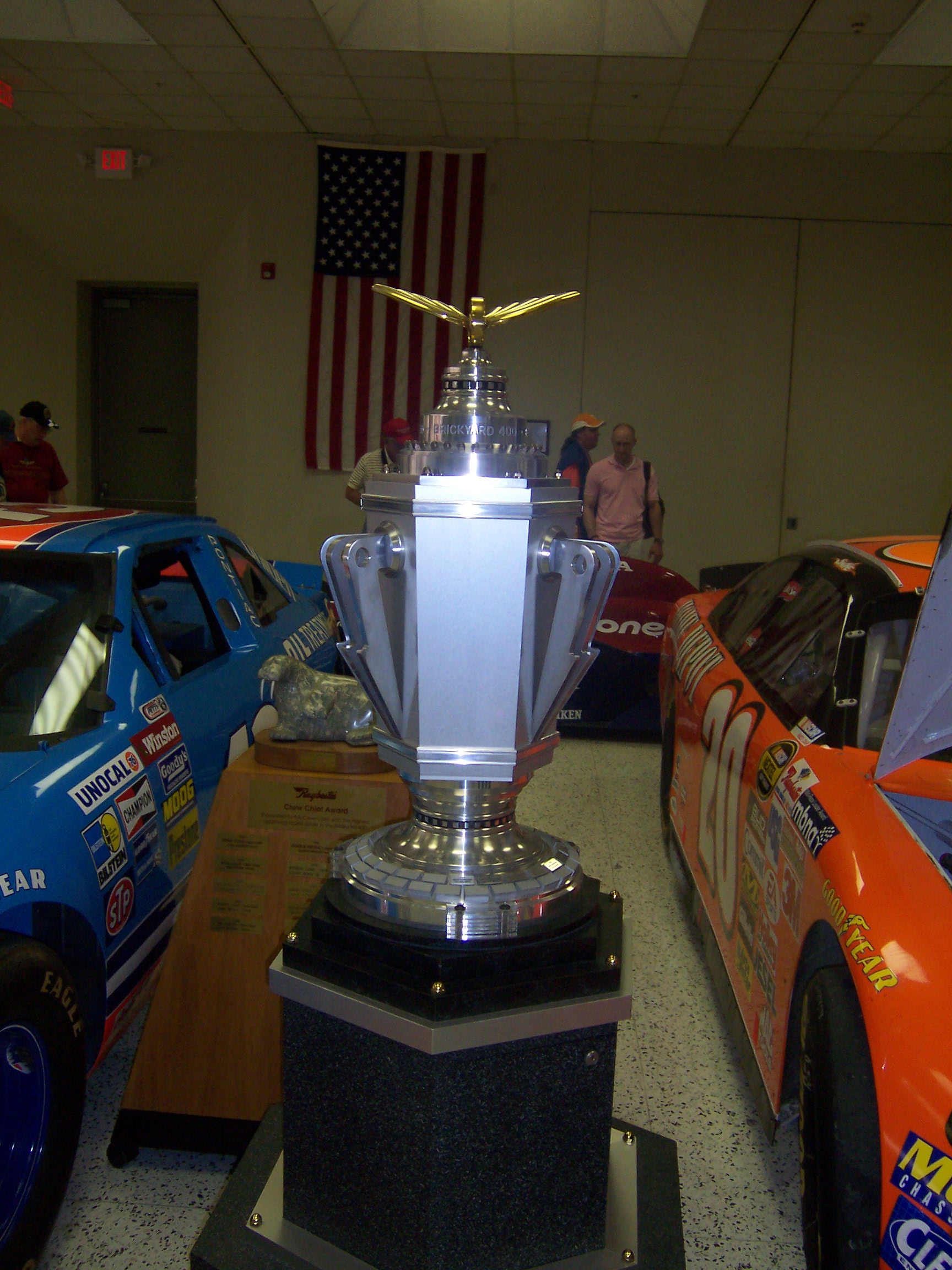
The winner of the Brickyard 400 is presented with the PPG Trophy in victory lane.

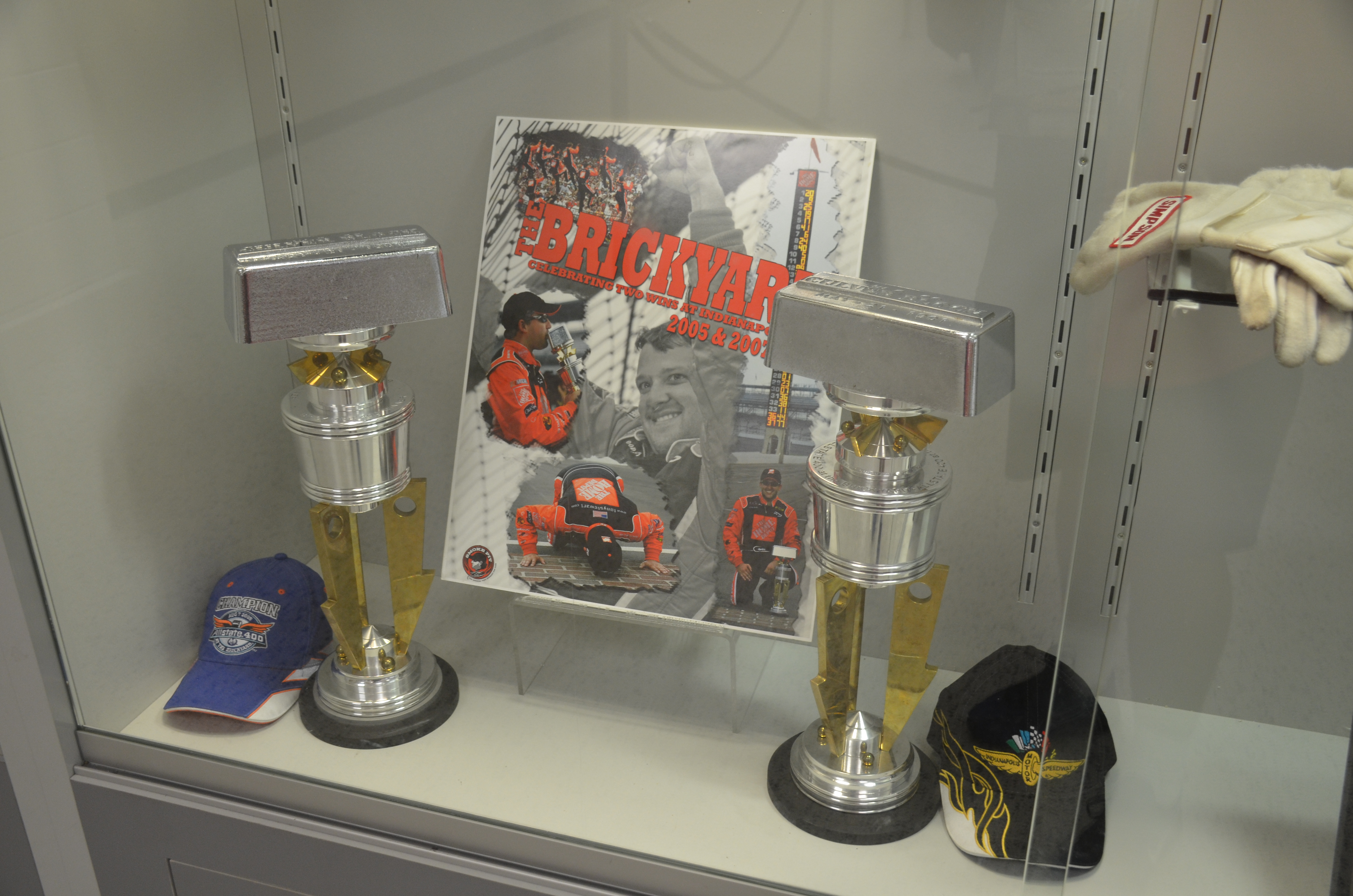
Driver trophies for the Brickyard 400.

=== Race winners ===
Year	Date	No.	Driver	Team	Manufacturer	Race Distance		Race Time	Average Speed (mph)	Report	Ref
Year	Date	No.	Driver	Team	Manufacturer	Laps	Miles (km)	Race Time	Average Speed (mph)	Report	Ref
1994	August 6	24	Jeff Gordon	Hendrick Motorsports	Chevrolet	160	400 (643.737)	3:01:51	131.977	Report	
1995	August 5	3	Dale Earnhardt	Richard Childress Racing	Chevrolet	160	400 (643.737)	2:34:38	155.206	Report	
1996	August 3	88	Dale Jarrett	Robert Yates Racing	Ford	160	400 (643.737)	2:52:02	139.508	Report	
1997	August 2	10	Ricky Rudd	Rudd Performance Motorsports	Ford	160	400 (643.737)	3:03:28	130.828	Report	
1998	August 1	24	Jeff Gordon	Hendrick Motorsports	Chevrolet	160	400 (643.737)	3:09:19	126.772	Report	
1999	August 7	88	Dale Jarrett	Robert Yates Racing	Ford	160	400 (643.737)	2:41:57	148.194	Report	
2000	August 5	18	Bobby Labonte	Joe Gibbs Racing	Pontiac	160	400 (643.737)	2:33:56	155.912	Report	
2001	August 5	24	Jeff Gordon	Hendrick Motorsports	Chevrolet	160	400 (643.737)	3:03:30	130.79	Report	
2002	August 4	9	Bill Elliott	Evernham Motorsports	Dodge	160	400 (643.737)	3:11:57	125.033	Report	
2003	August 3	29	Kevin Harvick	Richard Childress Racing	Chevrolet	160	400 (643.737)	2:58:22	134.548	Report	
2004	August 8	24	Jeff Gordon	Hendrick Motorsports	Chevrolet	161*	402.5 (647.76)	3:29:56	115.037	Report	
2005	August 7	20	Tony Stewart	Joe Gibbs Racing	Chevrolet	160	400 (643.737)	3:22:03	118.782	Report	
2006	August 6	48	Jimmie Johnson	Hendrick Motorsports	Chevrolet	160	400 (643.737)	2:54:57	137.182	Report	
2007	July 29	20	Tony Stewart	Joe Gibbs Racing	Chevrolet	160	400 (643.737)	3:24:28	117.379	Report	
2008	July 27	48	Jimmie Johnson	Hendrick Motorsports	Chevrolet	160	400 (643.737)	3:28:29	115.117	Report	
2009	July 26	48	Jimmie Johnson	Hendrick Motorsports	Chevrolet	160	400 (643.737)	2:44:31	145.882	Report	
2010	July 25	1	Jamie McMurray	Earnhardt Ganassi Racing	Chevrolet	160	400 (643.737)	2:56:24	136.054	Report	
2011	July 31	27	Paul Menard	Richard Childress Racing	Chevrolet	160	400 (643.737)	2:52:18	140.762	Report	
2012	July 29	48	Jimmie Johnson	Hendrick Motorsports	Chevrolet	160	400 (643.737)	2:54:19	137.68	Report	
2013	July 28	39	Ryan Newman	Stewart–Haas Racing	Chevrolet	160	400 (643.737)	2:36:22	153.485	Report	
2014	July 27	24	Jeff Gordon	Hendrick Motorsports	Chevrolet	160	400 (643.737)	2:39:41	150.297	Report	
2015	July 26	18	Kyle Busch	Joe Gibbs Racing	Toyota	164*	410 (659.831)	3:06:51	131.656	Report	
2016	July 24	18	Kyle Busch	Joe Gibbs Racing	Toyota	170*	425 (683.971)	3:17:46	128.94	Report	
2017	July 23	5	Kasey Kahne	Hendrick Motorsports	Chevrolet	167*	417.5 (671.901)	3:39:00	114.384	Report	
2018	September 10*	2	Brad Keselowski	Team Penske	Ford	160	400 (643.737)	3:06:35	128.629	Report	
2019	September 8	4	Kevin Harvick	Stewart–Haas Racing	Ford	160	400 (643.737)	3:20:06	119.443	Report	
2020	July 5	4	Kevin Harvick	Stewart–Haas Racing	Ford	161*	402.5 (647.760)	3:16:05	123.162	Report	
2021 – 2023	Race held on Indianapolis road course										
2024	July 21	5	Kyle Larson	Hendrick Motorsports	Chevrolet	167*	417.5 (671.901)	3:29:09	119.77	Report	
2025	July 27	23	Bubba Wallace	23XI Racing	Toyota	168*	420 (675.923)	3:22:15	124.598	Report	
2026	July 26	67	Corey Heim	23XI Racing	Toyota	160	400 (643.737)	3:08:21	127.422	Report	
2027	July 25									Report	

==== Notes ====
- 2004, 2015–2017, 2020, 2024, and 2025: Race extended due to a NASCAR Overtime finish. 2016 and 2017 races took two attempts.
- 2017: Race was red-flagged three times, first due to weather and then due to crashes, and also set a record for cautions, collectively extending the race to nearly 9:00 p.m. eastern, just minutes from sunset.
- 2018: Race postponed from Sunday to Monday due to rain.

==== Multiple winners (drivers) ====
# Wins	Driver	Years won
5	Jeff Gordon	1994, 1998, 2001, 2004, 2014
4	Jimmie Johnson	2006, 2008, 2009, 2012
3	Kevin Harvick	2003, 2019, 2020
2	Dale Jarrett	1996, 1999
2	Tony Stewart	2005, 2007
2	Kyle Busch	2015, 2016

==== Multiple winners (teams) ====
# Wins	Team	Years won
11	Hendrick Motorsports	1994, 1998, 2001, 2004, 2006, 2008, 2009, 2012, 2014, 2017, 2024
5	Joe Gibbs Racing	2000, 2005, 2007, 2015, 2016
3	Richard Childress Racing	1995, 2003, 2011
3	Stewart–Haas Racing	2013, 2019, 2020
2	Robert Yates Racing	1996, 1999
2	23XI Racing	2025–2026

==== Manufacturer wins ====
# Wins	Manufacturer	Years won
18	Chevrolet	1994, 1995, 1998, 2001, 2003–2014, 2017, 2024
6	Ford	1996, 1997, 1999, 2018–2020
4	Toyota	2015, 2016, 2025–2026
1	Pontiac	2000
1	Dodge	2002

=== NASCAR Cup Series records ===
(Through 2020)

Most starts	23	Jeff Gordon
Most wins	5	Jeff Gordon
Most Top fives	12	Jeff Gordon
Most Top tens	17	Jeff Gordon
Most poles	3	Jeff Gordon; Kevin Harvick; Kyle Busch**
Most laps completed	3,519	Jeff Gordon
Most laps led	528	Jeff Gordon
Most laps led in single race	149	Kyle Busch
Average Start*	6.6	Juan Pablo Montoya
Average Finish*	8.6	Kevin Harvick

* from minimum 5 starts.
** Two poles earned; in 2018, qualifying was rained out and the field was set by championship point

==== Winners from pole position ====
Five races have been won by drivers from the pole position.

- 2003: Kevin Harvick
- 2008: Jimmie Johnson
- 2013: Ryan Newman
- 2016: Kyle Busch
- 2019: Kevin Harvick

==== Daytona 500 & Brickyard 400 ====
Three drivers have won the Daytona 500 and the Brickyard 400 in the same season:

- 1996: Dale Jarrett
- 2006: Jimmie Johnson
- 2010: Jamie McMurray

Five other drivers (Jeff Gordon, Dale Earnhardt, Bill Elliott, Kevin Harvick, and Ryan Newman) have won both the Daytona 500 and Brickyard 400 in their respective careers, although not in the same season.

==== Brickyard 400 and NASCAR Cup Series champions ====
The winner of the Brickyard 400 has gone on to win the NASCAR Cup Series championship in the same season nine times out of 23 runnings from 1994 to 2016. This includes a notable streak of four consecutive seasons (1998–2001), and 8 out of 12 years from 1998 to 2009. Jeff Gordon (2) and Jimmie Johnson (3) are the only two drivers to have accomplished it more than once.

- 1998: Jeff Gordon
- 1999: Dale Jarrett
- 2000: Bobby Labonte
- 2001: Jeff Gordon
- 2005: Tony Stewart
- 2006: Jimmie Johnson
- 2008: Jimmie Johnson
- 2009: Jimmie Johnson
- 2015: Kyle Busch

==== Brickyard 400 & Indianapolis 500 ====
Through 2025, a total of 21 drivers have competed in both the Brickyard 400 and Indianapolis 500. An additional twelve drivers have attempted to qualify for both, but failed to qualify at one or the other, or both races. Juan Pablo Montoya and Jacques Villeneuve are the only two drivers to compete at the Indy 500, Brickyard 400, and U.S. Grand Prix at Indy. Montoya holds the highest finish between the two races, with two wins in the 500 and a second place in the 400. Larry Foyt was the first driver to compete in both races having competed in the 400 first; 16 of the 21 other participants competed in the 500 prior to racing in the 400.

Juan Pablo Montoya has also competed in the Brickyard Grand Prix and IndyCar Grand Prix. Two-time Indy 500 pole winner Scott Brayton was initially entered in the 1995 Brickyard 400, but wrecked his car during a private test session. He suffered a broken ankle and a concussion, and withdrew from the event. Geoff Brabham, Larry Foyt, Max Papis, and Bill Elliott have all also competed in the Indy Legends Charity Pro–Am race. Of those four drivers, Elliott, the 2002 Brickyard 400 winner, is the only one to have never driven in the Indy 500 in his career.

Two car owners have swept both the Indianapolis 500 and Brickyard 400 in the same year. Chip Ganassi (Ganassi Racing) won both races in 2010, and Roger Penske (Team Penske) won both in 2018. During his driving career, Ganassi himself made five starts in the 500, but did not compete in any NASCAR races.

The drivers who have raced in both the 500 and 400 in the same year are denoted (**).

- A. J. Foyt
- Danny Sullivan
- Geoff Brabham
- John Andretti**
- Tony Stewart**
- Juan Pablo Montoya**
- Jacques Villeneuve
- Scott Pruett
- Sam Hornish Jr.
- Jason Leffler
- Robby Gordon**
- Larry Foyt
- J. J. Yeley
- Max Papis
- Patrick Carpentier
- A. J. Allmendinger**
- Danica Patrick
- Kurt Busch**
- Jimmie Johnson
- Kyle Larson**
- Katherine Legge

Failed to qualify:

- Raced in the 500 but failed to qualify for the 400: Gary Bettenhausen, Pancho Carter, Stan Fox, Andy Hillenburg, Davy Jones, P. J. Jones, Christian Fittipaldi
- Raced in the 400 but failed to qualify for the 500: Casey Mears, Ken Schrader, Scott Speed
- Failed to qualify at both 500 and 400: Charlie Glotzbach, Stanton Barrett

Neil Bonnett, who entered but did not qualify for the 1979 Indianapolis 500, announced plans to enter the 1994 Brickyard 400. However, Bonnett was fatally injured in a crash at Daytona in February 1994, five months before the Brickyard 400 was to be held. Junior Johnson, who entered as a driver but did not qualify for the 1963 Indianapolis 500, was a car owner at the 400 in 1994–1995. Three-time Indy 500 winner Dario Franchitti switched to NASCAR for the 2008 season. However, his team disbanded less than a month before he was expected to enter the 2008 Brickyard 400.

=== Other past winners ===
==== Crown Royal Your Name Here 400 sweepstakes winners ====
From 2012 to 2016, Crown Royal was the title sponsor of the race; Under Crown Royal sponsorship, the race was part of Crown Royal "Your Hero's Name Here" program, in which the race was named after an armed forces member or first responder nominated by fans. The nominated hero also received a VIP experience for the race, and presented the winner's trophy. For the 2016 race, retired Navy SEAL Jason Redman won the nomination. Redman chose to for the race to be named after his charity, the Combat Wounded Coalition, instead, resulting in the race being titled Crown Royal Presents the Combat Wounded Coalition 400 at the Brickyard.

Year	Winner
2012	Curtiss Shaver
2013	Samuel Deeds
2014	John Wayne Walding
2015	Jeff Kyle
2016	Jason Redman*

== Television and radio ==
=== ABC ===
From 1994 to 2000, the race was broadcast live on ABC Sports, who had televised the Indianapolis 500 since 1965. ESPN/ESPN2 carried live coverage of practice and qualifying. The race was scheduled for the first Saturday in August, at 12:15 pm EST (1:15 pm EDT). Saturday was chosen for the running of the race to allow for Sunday as a rain date. In the Indianapolis market, the race was blacked out, and aired in same-day tape delay later in the evening. This resulted in ABC's primetime programming moving into the afternoon slots, in a similar vein to that of the Indianapolis 500.

Prior to the first running, ESPN covered the feasibility tests in both 1992 and 1993 through its SpeedWeek program. During the 1992 test, ESPN utilized on-board footage from inside Kyle Petty's car, captured from Petty's personal video camera. During the summer leading up to the 1994 race, ESPN broadcast a series of preview shows titled Road to the Brickyard.

In 1995, rain delayed the start until 4:25 EST (5:25 EDT). ABC had already signed off, and made the decision to air the race via tape delay on ESPN the following day. In the greater Indianapolis area, the race was shown tape delay that night at 7 pm on WRTV as planned, as ABC network programming had already aired in the afternoon. The 1995 race ran until 7:03 pm EST (8:03 pm EDT), which was believed to be the second-latest time of day cars have ever driven on the track.

Year	Network	Lap-by-lap	Color commentator(s)	Pit reporters	Ratings
1994	ABC	Bob Jenkins	Benny Parsons	Jack Arute; Jerry Punch; Gary Gerould	5.7
1995	ABC; ESPN	Bob Jenkins	Benny Parsons	Jack Arute; Jerry Punch; Gary Gerould	4.3 (ABC); 2.9 (ESPN)
1996	ABC	Bob Jenkins	Benny Parsons; Danny Sullivan (turn 2)	Jack Arute; Jerry Punch; Gary Gerould	4.3
1997	ABC	Bob Jenkins	Benny Parsons	Jack Arute; Jerry Punch; Bill Weber	5.3/18
1998	ABC	Bob Jenkins	Benny Parsons	Jack Arute; Jerry Punch; Bill Weber	4.1/14
1999	ABC	Bob Jenkins	Benny Parsons	Jerry Punch; Bill Weber; Ray Dunlap	4.6/15
2000	ABC	Bob Jenkins	Benny Parsons; Ray Evernham	Jerry Punch; Bill Weber; Ray Dunlap	3.7/10

- Note: Paul Page served as pre-race host in 1994–1996.

=== NBC/TNT ===
From 2001 to 2006, the race was broadcast on NBC, as part of a new eight-year, $2.4-billion centralized television deal involving FOX/FX and NBC/TNT. The race was moved from Saturday to Sunday, and the start time was moved to 1:45 pm EST (2:45 pm EDT). In 2006, Indiana began observing Daylight Saving Time, and the race was scheduled for 2:45 pm EDT.

After switching to NBC and the centralized television contract, the local blackout policy was lifted. During this contract, TNT carried pole qualifying live. The final "Happy Hour" practice was carried live on CNN/SI in 2001, and on Speed from 2002 to 2006.

Year	Network	Host	Lap-by-lap	Color commentator(s)	Pit reporters	Ratings	Viewers
2001	NBC	Bill Weber	Allen Bestwick	Benny Parsons; Wally Dallenbach	Bill Weber; Marty Snider; Dave Burns; Matt Yocum	6.2/16	
2002	NBC	Bill Weber	Allen Bestwick	Benny Parsons; Wally Dallenbach	Bill Weber; Marty Snider; Dave Burns; Matt Yocum	6.3/16	10.2 million
2003	NBC	Bill Weber	Allen Bestwick	Benny Parsons; Wally Dallenbach	Bill Weber; Marty Snider; Dave Burns; Matt Yocum	6.0/15	9.7 million
2004	NBC	Bill Weber	Allen Bestwick	Benny Parsons; Wally Dallenbach	Bill Weber; Marty Snider; Dave Burns; Matt Yocum	6.1/15	9.3 million
2005	NBC	Bill Weber	Bill Weber	Benny Parsons; Wally Dallenbach	Allen Bestwick; Marty Snider; Dave Burns; Matt Yocum	6.2/15	9.5 million
2006	NBC	Bill Weber	Bill Weber	Benny Parsons; Wally Dallenbach	Allen Bestwick; Marty Snider; Dave Burns; Matt Yocum	5.5/13	8.645 million

- Notes: Bill Weber served as pre-race host on the NBC "War Wagon" from 2001 to 2004, and in the booth in 2005–2006.

=== ESPN ===
From 2007 to 2014, under the terms of a new $4.48-billion contract, television rights were held by ESPN. The race swapped dates with the Pennsylvania 500, and effectively moved up one weekend. The change was made so that ESPN/ABC could kick off their NASCAR coverage with the more-attractive telecast. The move to cable drew some mild controversy after thirteen years of having been on network television. The starting time was slightly earlier than in the past, at 2:30 pm EDT. Practice and qualifying are carried by ESPN, ESPN2, and Speed.

In 2009–2014, the race was advertised on ESPN as Brickyard 400 presented by Golden Corral. The different name is due to a standing policy by NASCAR to not mention the race's title sponsor on-air more than the required twice per hour unless an advertising premium is paid to the network.

Year	Network	NASCAR Countdown	Lap-by-lap	Color commentator(s)	Pit reporters	Ratings	Viewers
2007	ESPN	Brent Musburger; Suzy Kolber; Brad Daugherty	Jerry Punch	Rusty Wallace; Andy Petree	Allen Bestwick; Dave Burns; Jamie Little; Mike Massaro	4.2 (4.9 cable)	6.574 million
2008	ESPN	Allen Bestwick; Rusty Wallace; Brad Daugherty	Jerry Punch	Dale Jarrett; Andy Petree	Dave Burns; Jamie Little; Mike Massaro; Shannon Spake	4.3 (5.1 cable)	6.668 million
2009	ESPN	Allen Bestwick; Rusty Wallace; Brad Daugherty; Ray Evernham	Jerry Punch	Dale Jarrett; Andy Petree	Dave Burns; Jamie Little; Shannon Spake; Vince Welch	4.1 (4.8 cable)	6.487 million
2010	ESPN	Allen Bestwick; Rusty Wallace; Brad Daugherty; Ray Evernham	Marty Reid	Dale Jarrett; Andy Petree	Jerry Punch; Dave Burns; Jamie Little; Vince Welch	3.6 (4.2 cable)	5.709 million
2011	ESPN	Nicole Briscoe; Rusty Wallace; Brad Daugherty	Allen Bestwick	Dale Jarrett; Andy Petree	Jerry Punch; Dave Burns; Jamie Little; Vince Welch	4.0 (4.6 cable)	6.337 million
2012	ESPN	Nicole Briscoe; Rusty Wallace; Brad Daugherty; Ray Evernham	Allen Bestwick	Dale Jarrett; Andy Petree	Jerry Punch; Dave Burns; Jamie Little; Vince Welch	3.3	5.1 million
2013	ESPN	Nicole Briscoe; Rusty Wallace; Brad Daugherty; Ray Evernham	Allen Bestwick	Dale Jarrett; Andy Petree	Jerry Punch; Dave Burns; Jamie Little; Vince Welch	3.6	5.5 million
2014	ESPN	Nicole Briscoe; Rusty Wallace; Brad Daugherty	Allen Bestwick	Dale Jarrett; Andy Petree	Jerry Punch; Dave Burns; Jamie Little; Vince Welch	3.4	5.2 million

=== NBCSN/NBC ===
Under the terms of a new $2.7 billion television deal from 2015 to 2024, the race is part of the NASCAR on NBC package. In 2015 and 2016, the race aired live on NBCSN. In 2017, as a deal with broadcasting changes, the race aired on NBC.

Also in 2015 and again in 2016, the race was advertised on NBCSN as NASCAR Sprint Cup Series Racing from the Brickyard Presented by Golden Corral, with the Golden Corral sponsorship being transferred from ESPN. Crown Royal has never paid the advertising premiums required by the network broadcasting the race to be mentioned as title sponsor of the race, either to ESPN/ABC or to NBC. In 2017, the race aired on NBC, returning to a broadcast network for the first time since 2006. The race moved back to NBCSN in 2018 before returning to NBC for its final two years (2019 and 2020).

Year	Network	Host	Lap-by-lap	Color commentator(s)	Pit reporter(s)	Ratings	Viewers
2015	NBCSN	Krista Voda; Kyle Petty; Dale Jarrett	Rick Allen	Jeff Burton; Steve Letarte	Marty Snider; Dave Burns; Mike Massaro; Kelli Stavast	3.0	4.7 million
2016	NBCSN	Krista Voda; Kyle Petty; Dale Jarrett	Rick Allen	Jeff Burton; Steve Letarte	Marty Snider; Dave Burns; Mike Massaro; Kelli Stavast	3.1	5.2 million
2017	NBC	Krista Voda; Kyle Petty; Dale Jarrett	Rick Allen	Jeff Burton; Steve Letarte	Marty Snider; Dave Burns; Kelli Stavast; Parker Kligerman	3.3	5.6 million
2018	NBCSN	Krista Voda; Kyle Petty; Dale Jarrett	Rick Allen	Steve Letarte; Mike Bagley (turn 2); Dale Earnhardt Jr. (turn 3); Jeff Burton (turn 4)	Marty Snider; Dave Burns; Kelli Stavast; Parker Kligerman	1.2	1.24 million
2019	NBC	Krista Voda; Kyle Petty; Dale Jarrett	Rick Allen	Steve Letarte; Mike Bagley (turn 2); Dale Earnhardt Jr. (turn 3); Jeff Burton (turn 4)	Marty Snider; Dave Burns; Kelli Stavast	1.9	3.0 million
2020	NBC	Mike Tirico; Dale Jarrett	Rick Allen	Jeff Burton; Steve Letarte; Dale Earnhardt Jr.	Marty Snider; Kelli Stavast	2.7	4.3 million
2024	NBC	Marty Snider; Dale Jarrett	Rick Allen	Jeff Burton; Steve Letarte	Marty Snider; Dave Burns; Kim Coon	2.1	3.63 million

=== TNT (2025-26) / CBS Sports (2027-) ===
Under the terms of a new television deal from 2025 to 2031, the race is broadcast on TNT. Following the acquisition of Warner Bros. Discovery in October 2026, the newly merged Skydance Corporation has the right to move the race to the CBS broadcast network starting in 2027. The race is produced by NASCAR Productions.

Year	Network	Host	Lap-by-lap	Color commentator(s)	Pit reporter(s)	Ratings	Viewers
2025	TNT	Shannon Spake; Jamie McMurray; Parker Kligerman	Adam Alexander	Dale Earnhardt Jr. Steve Letarte	Marty Snider; Danielle Trotta; Alan Cavanna; Mamba Smith	2.5	2.5 million
2026	TNT	Marty Smith; Jimmie Johnson; Jamie McMurray	Adam Alexander	Dale Earnhardt Jr. Steve Letarte	Marty Snider; Shannon Spake; Danielle Trotta; Mamba Smith		

=== Radio ===
All races have been broadcast on radio through the IMS Radio Network. Since 2004, Performance Racing Network has co-produced the race.

From 1994 to 1999, Mike Joy anchored the broadcast. From 2000 to 2003, Mike King served as chief announcer. In 2004, Doug Rice joined King as co-anchor. In 2007–2008, the co-anchors were Doug Rice and Bob Jenkins. In 2009, Jenkins moved to Versus for IndyCar, and as a result, Chris Denari took over as co-anchor with Doug Rice.

== See also ==
- Verizon 200 at the Brickyard (former Cup race on the Road Course layout)
- Pennzoil 150/Pennzoil 250 (Former O'Reilly Auto Parts race on the road course layout and current O'Reilly Auto Parts race on the oval)
- Indianapolis 500
- IROC at Indy
- List of attractions and events in Indianapolis

Previous race: Dollar Tree 400	NASCAR Cup Series; Brickyard 400	Next race: Anduril 250
