= ARCA races at Iowa =

ARCA Menards Series races at Iowa Speedway

- Venue: Iowa Speedway
- Location: Newton, Iowa, United States

Circuit information
- Surface: Asphalt
- Length: 0.875 mi (1.408 km)
- Turns: 4

Stock car racing events in the ARCA Menards Series have been held at Iowa Speedway, in Newton, Iowa during numerous seasons and times of year since 2006.

== ARCA Menards Series ==
Shore Lunch 150

ARCA Menards Series
- Venue: Iowa Speedway
- Location: Newton, Iowa, United States
- Corporate sponsor: Shore Lunch
- First race: 2006
- Distance: 131.25 mi (211.226 km)
- Laps: 150
- Previous names: Prairie Meadows 250 (2006–2008); Prairie Meadows 200 (2009–2012); Prairie Meadows 150 (2013) #ThisIsMySpeedway 150 (2015); ABC Supply 150 (2016); Fans With Benefits 150 (2017–2019); Shore Lunch 150 (2020)
- Most wins (team): Cunningham Motorsports (5)
- Most wins (manufacturer): Dodge (5)

Circuit information
- Surface: Asphalt
- Length: 0.875 mi (1.408 km)
- Turns: 4

The Shore Lunch 150 was an ARCA Menards Series race held at Iowa Speedway in Newton, Iowa. The inaugural race was held on October 15, 2006 and was 250 laps in length. The race was shortened to 200 laps in 2009 and 150 laps in 2013. From 2015 to 2020, the race was held on the same weekend as the IndyCar Series race at Iowa.

=== Past winners ===
Year	Date	No.	Driver	Team	Manufacturer	Race Distance		Race Time	Average Speed (mph)	Report	Ref
Year	Date	No.	Driver	Team	Manufacturer	Laps	Miles (km)	Race Time	Average Speed (mph)	Report	Ref
2006	October 15	61	Steve Wallace	Rusty Wallace Inc.	Dodge	250	218.75 (352.04)	2:24:25	90.833	Report	
2007	June 2	46	Frank Kimmel	Clement Racing	Ford	250	218.75 (352.04)	2:08:04	102.486	Report	
2008	April 19	39	Matt Hawkins	Matt Hawkins Racing	Dodge	250	218.75 (352.04)	2:13:13	98.524	Report	
2009	July 11	77	Parker Kligerman	Cunningham Motorsports	Dodge	200	175 (281.63)	1:39:47	105.228	Report	
2010	July 10	77	Tom Hessert III	Cunningham Motorsports	Dodge	200	175 (281.63)	1:39:24	105.634	Report	
2011	July 16	41	Ty Dillon	Richard Childress Racing	Chevrolet	200	175 (281.63)	1:50:00	95.455	Report	
2012	July 13	22	Alex Bowman	Cunningham Motorsports	Dodge	202*	176.75 (284.45)	1:51:56	94.744	Report	
2013	September 7	90	Grant Enfinger	Team BCR Racing	Ford	150	131.25 (211.23)	1:17:18	101.876	Report	
2014	Not held										
2015	July 17	98	Mason Mitchell	Mason Mitchell Motorsports	Chevrolet	159*	139.125 (223.90)	1:42:36	81.364	Report	
2016	July 17	77	Chase Briscoe	Cunningham Motorsports	Ford	150	131.25 (211.23)	1:14:42	105.403	Report	
2017	July 8	77	Dalton Sargeant	Cunningham Motorsports	Ford	150	131.25 (211.23)	1:27:30	90.395	Report	
2018	July 7	28	Sheldon Creed	MDM Motorsports	Toyota	150	131.25 (211.23)	1:19:56	98.521	Report	
2019	July 19	20	Chandler Smith	Venturini Motorsports	Toyota	150	131.25 (211.23)	1:20:40	97.624	Report	
2020	July 18	18	Ty Gibbs	Joe Gibbs Racing	Toyota	150	131.25 (211.23)	1:22:23	95.59	Report	

- 2012 and 2015: Race extended due to a green–white–checker finish.

=== Multiple winners (teams) ===
# Wins	Team	Years won
5	Cunningham Motorsports	2009, 2010, 2012, 2016, 2017

=== Manufacturer wins ===
# Wins	Manufacturer	Years won
5	Dodge	2006, 2008, 2009, 2010, 2012
4	Ford	2007, 2013, 2016, 2017
3	Toyota	2018, 2019, 2020
2	Chevrolet	2011, 2015

== ARCA / ARCA East ==
JR & CO. 150
ARCA Menards Series ARCA Menards Series East
- Venue: Iowa Speedway
- Location: Newton, Iowa, United States
- Corporate sponsor: JR & CO.
- First race: 2021
- Distance: 131.25 mi (211.226 km)
- Laps: 150
- Previous names: Shore Lunch 150 (2021); Calypso Lemonade 150 (2022); Atlas 150 (2024–2025)
- Most wins (team): Pinnacle Racing Group (3)
- Most wins (manufacturer): Chevrolet (3)

Circuit information
- Surface: Asphalt
- Length: 0.875 mi (1.408 km)
- Turns: 4

Shore Lunch was the title sponsor of the race in 2021

The JR & CO. 150 is an ARCA Menards Series/ARCA Menards Series East combination race held at Iowa Speedway in Newton, Iowa.

The ARCA Menards Series East, formerly the NASCAR K&N Pro Series East, joined the ARCA Menards Series in this race starting in 2021 and it became one of three combination races for the two series, the others being Milwaukee and Bristol.

=== Past winners ===
Year	Date	No.	Driver	Team	Manufacturer	Race Distance		Race Time	Average Speed (mph)	Report	Ref
Year	Date	No.	Driver	Team	Manufacturer	Laps	Miles (km)	Race Time	Average Speed (mph)	Report	Ref
2021	July 24	18	Ty Gibbs	Joe Gibbs Racing	Toyota	150	131.25 (211.23)	1:25:59	91.588	Report	
2022	June 11	81	Brandon Jones	Joe Gibbs Racing	Toyota	150	131.25 (211.23)	1:27:01	90.5	Report	
2023	Not held										
2024	June 14	28	Connor Zilisch	Pinnacle Racing Group	Chevrolet	150	131.25 (211.23)	1:59:44	65.771	Report	
2025	August 1	28	Brenden Queen	Pinnacle Racing Group	Chevrolet	150	131.25 (211.23)	1:24:1	93.49	Report	
2026	August 7	77	Tristan McKee	Pinnacle Racing Group	Chevrolet	150	131.25 (211.23)			Report	

=== Multiple winners (teams) ===
# Wins	Team	Years won
3	Pinnacle Racing Group	2024–2026
2	Joe Gibbs Racing	2021, 2022

=== Manufacturer wins ===
# Wins	Manufacturer	Years won
3	Chevrolet	2024–2026
2	Toyota	2021, 2022

== ARCA East / ARCA West ==
Casey's General Store 150
NASCAR K&N Pro Series East / NASCAR K&N Pro Series West
- Venue: Iowa Speedway
- Location: Newton, Iowa; United States
- Corporate sponsor: Casey's General Stores
- First race: 2007
- Last race: 2019
- Distance: 131.2 miles (211.145 km)
- Laps: 150
- Previous names: Featherlite Coaches 200 (2007); U.S. Cellular 200 presented by Wellmark (2008); Long John Silvers 200 (2009); Goodyear Dealers of Iowa 200 (2010); Pork Be Inspired 175 presented by Wellmark (2011); Graham Tire 150 (2012); Casey's General Store 150 (2013-present) --- Former second races Central IA Building & Construction Trades 125 (2009); Pork Be Inspired 150 (2012–2013); AutoLite Iridium XP 150 (2014) #ThanksKenny 150 (2015)

Circuit information
- Surface: Asphalt
- Length: 0.875 mi (1.408 km)
- Turns: 4

The Casey's General Store 150 was a NASCAR K&N Pro Series East and NASCAR K&N Pro Series West combined race held annually at Iowa Speedway. From 2007 to 2010, it was a 175-mile (282 km) race. In 2010, it was a 153.1-mile (246.4 km) race. From 2012, it was reduced to 131.2 miles (211.1 km).

=== History ===
From 2007 through 2016 there were two different winners in the race (one in the East and the other in the West). The overall winner received the win in the series that the driver was eligible for points while the best placed driver from the other series also received the win (in the other series). Starting at 2017, the overall winner receives two separate wins (one in the East and the other in the West).

Starting in 2011 the race became a support race for the NASCAR Xfinity Series weekend.

=== Past winners ===
Year	Date	No.	Driver	Team	Manufacturer	Race Distance		Race time	Average speed (mph)	Report
Year	Date	No.	Driver	Team	Manufacturer	Laps	Miles	Race time	Average speed (mph)	Report
Main race
2007	May 20	10	Joey Logano (Kevin Harvick - West) (Note: Joey Logano won the race competing in the K&N Pro Series East. Kevin Harvick, who finished 2nd, was the first K&N Pro Series West driver and was credited with the win in the West.)	Joe Gibbs Racing	Chevrolet	200	175 (281.635)	2:10:08	80.686	Report
2008	May 18	15	Brian Ickler (Jim Inglebright - West) (Note: Brian Ickler won the race competing in the K&N Pro Series East. Jim Inglebright, who finished 9th, was the first K&N Pro Series West driver and was credited with the win in the West.)	Ickler Motorsports	Chevrolet (2)	200	175 (281.635)	2:03:13	85.216	Report
2009	May 17	18	Kyle Busch (David Mayhew - West) (Note: Kyle Busch won the race competing in the K&N Pro Series East. David Mayhew who finished 3rd, was the first K&N Pro Series West driver and was credited with the win in the West.)	Joe Gibbs Racing (2)	Toyota	200	175 (281.635)	1:44:10	100.008	Report
2010	May 23	18	Max Gresham (David Mayhew - West) (Note: Max Gresham won the race competing in the K&N Pro Series East. David Mayhew, who finished 5th, was the first K&N Pro Series West driver and was credited with the win in the West.)	Joe Gibbs Racing (3)	Toyota (2)	201*	176 (283.245)	2:08:58	81.823	Report
2011	May 21	00	Brett Moffitt (Greg Pursley - West) (Note: Brett Moffitt won the race competing in the K&N Pro Series East. Greg Pursley, who finished 4th, was the first K&N Pro Series West driver and was credited with the win in the West.)	Michael Waltrip Racing	Toyota (3)	175	153.1 (246.390)	1:49:08	84.186	Report
2012	May 19	9	Chase Elliott (Dylan Kwasniewski - West) (Note: Chase Elliott won the race competing in the K&N Pro Series East. Dylan Kwasniewski, who finished 8th, was the first K&N Pro Series West driver and was credited with the win in the West.)	JR Motorsports	Chevrolet (4)	154*	135 (217.261)	1:43:18	78.267	Report
2012	August 3	07	Corey LaJoie (Michael Self - West) (Note: Corey LaJoie won the race competing in the K&N Pro Series East. Michael Self, who finished 9th, was the first K&N Pro Series West driver and was credited with the win in the West.)	Randy LaJoie Racing	Ford	150	131.2 (211.145)	1:28:36	88.883	Report
2013	June 7	21	Michael Self (Dylan Kwasniewski - East) (Note: Michael Self won the race competing in the K&N Pro Series West. Dylan Kwasniewski, who finished 2nd, was the first K&N Pro Series East driver and was credited with the win in the East.)	Steve Portenga Racing	Chevrolet (5)	159*	139 (223.699)	2:11:25	63.519	Report
2013	August 2	00	Cole Custer (Greg Pursley - West) (Note: Cole Custer won the race competing in the K&N Pro Series East. Greg Pursley, who finished 4th, was the first K&N Pro Series West driver and was credited with the win in the West.)	Ken Schrader Racing	Chevrolet (6)	150	131.2 (211.145)	1:33:37	84.012	Report
2014	May 17	41	Ben Rhodes (David Mayhew - West) (Note: Ben Rhodes won the race competing in the K&N Pro Series East. David Mayhew, who finished 9th, was the first K&N Pro Series West driver and was credited with the win in the West.)	Turner Scott Motorsports	Chevrolet (7)	150	131.2 (211.145)	1:24:25	93.287	Report
2014	August 1	33	Brandon Jones (Greg Pursley - West)	Turner Scott Motorsports (2)	Chevrolet (8)	150	131.2 (211.145)	1:27:56	89.556	Report
2015	May 16	16	Brandon McReynolds (William Byron - East) (Note: Brandon McReynolds won the race competing in the K&N Pro Series West. William Byron, who finished 2nd, was the first K&N Pro Series East driver and was credited with the win in the East.)	Bill McAnally Racing	Toyota (4)	150	131.2 (211.145)	1:33:27	132.592	Report
2015	July 31	16	Brandon McReynolds (2) (Jesse Little - East) (Note: Brandon McReynolds won the race competing in the K&N Pro Series West. Jesse Little, who finished 2nd, was the first K&N Pro Series East driver and was credited with the win in the East.)	Bill McAnally Racing (2)	Toyota (5)	150	131.2 (211.145)	1:27:27	90.051	Report
2016	July 29	16	Todd Gilliland (Kyle Benjamin - East) (Note: Todd Gilliland won the race competing in the K&N Pro Series West. Kyle Benjamin, who finished 2nd, was the first K&N Pro Series East driver and was credited with the win in the East.)	Bill McAnally Racing (3)	Toyota (6)	150	131.2 (211.245)	1:20:07	98.505	Report
2017	July 28	16	Todd Gilliland (2) (Both) (Note: Starting in 2017, the overall winner is credited with two separated wins (one in the East and the other in the West).)	Bill McAnally Racing (4)	Toyota (7)	150	131.2 (211.245)	1:27:40	89.829	Report
2018	July 27	17	Tyler Ankrum (Both)	DGR-Crosley	Toyota (8)	150	131.2 (211.245)	1:31:37	85.956	Report
2019	July 26	21	Sam Mayer (Both)	GMS Racing	Chevrolet (9)	150	131.2 (211.245)	1:28:54	88.583	Report

NASCAR K&N Pro Series West standalone race
- 2010, 2012 (1 of 2), and 2013 (1 of 2): Race extended due to a green-white-checker finish.

=== Multiple winners (drivers) ===
# Wins	Driver	Years won
2	Todd Gilliland	2016–2017

=== Multiple winners (teams) ===
# Wins	Team	Years won
4	Bill McAnally Racing	2015 (Both)—2017
3	Joe Gibbs Racing	2007, 2009 (1 of 2), 2010
2	Turner Scott Motorsports	2014 (Both)

=== Manufacturer wins ===
# Wins	Manufacturer	Years won
9	Chevrolet	2007–2009 (1 of 2), 2012 (1 of 2), 2013–2014 (Both), 2019
8	Toyota	2009 (1 of 2)—2011, 2015 (Both), 2016–2018
1	Ford	2012 (1 of 2)

Previous race: Circle City 150	ARCA Menards Series; Atlas 150	Next race: General Tire 100 at The Glen

Previous race: Circle City 150	ARCA Menards Series East; Atlas 150	Next race: Bush's Beans 200
