= Dodge R6P8 =

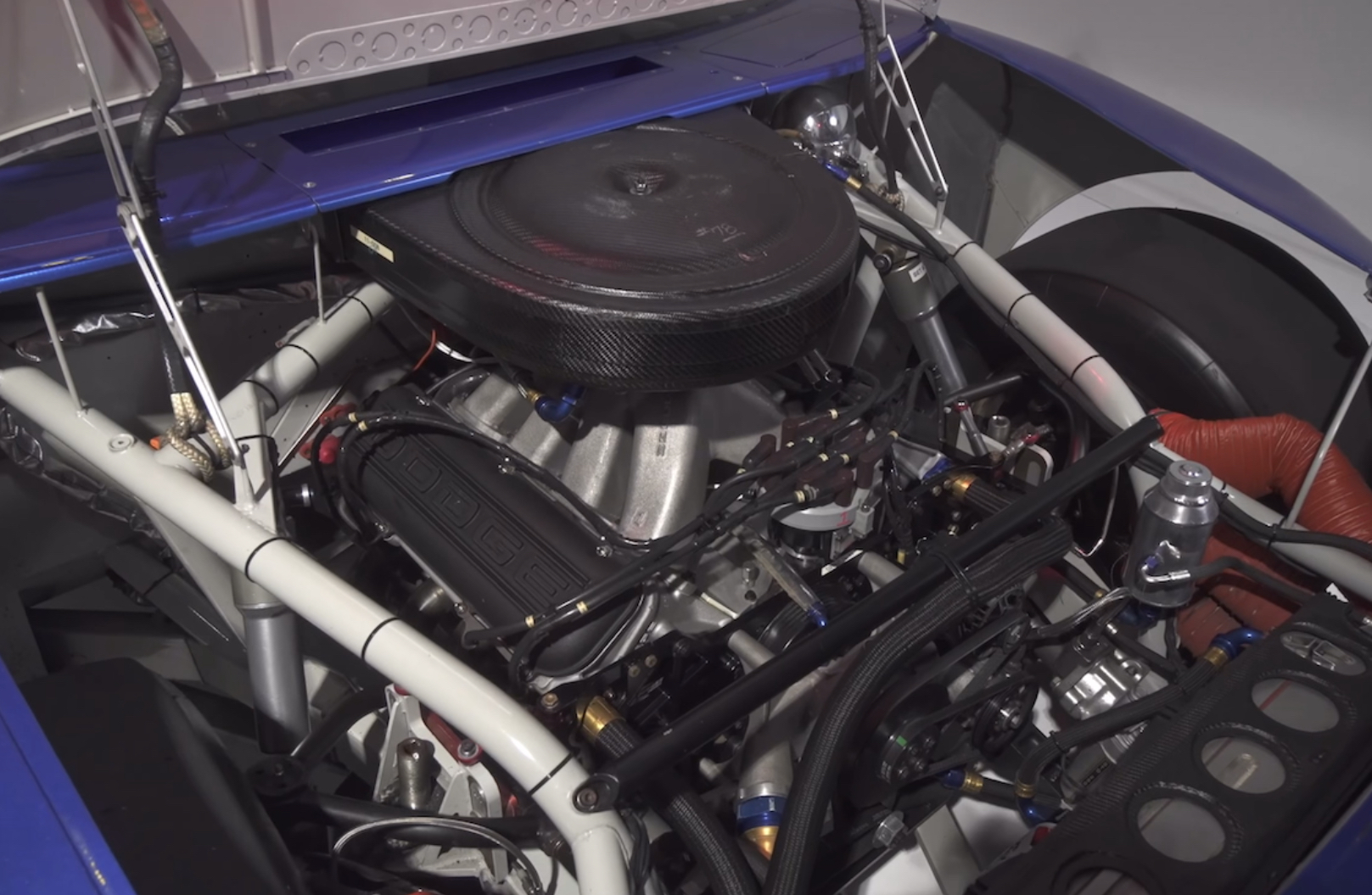
- A R6P8 pictured in 2025

Overview
- Manufacturer: Dodge; Team Penske
- Production: 2008–2012

Layout
- Configuration: V8 engine, 90° cylinder angle
- Displacement: 5.9 L (5,870 cc)
- Cylinder bore: 114.3 mm (4.5 in)
- Piston stroke: 82.55 mm (3 in)
- Cylinder block material: Compacted graphite iron
- Cylinder head material: Aluminum alloy
- Valvetrain: 16-valve, OHV, two-valves per cylinder

Combustion
- Fuel system: Electronic Port Fuel Injection (EFI) (NASCAR Cup Series); Carburetor (NASCAR O'Reilly Auto Parts Series)
- Management: MES TAG-400i
- Fuel type: 260 GTX Unleaded provided by Sunoco (2007–2010; still in use in ARCA); E15 Ethanol provided by Sunoco (2011–2018)
- Oil system: Dry sump

Output
- Power output: 440-950+ hp (410-708 kW) @ 9,000 rpm (depending on displacement.)
- Torque output: Approx. 388 lb⋅ft (526 N⋅m) @ 5,300 rpm

Dimensions
- Dry weight: 575 lb (261 kg)

Chronology
- Predecessor: Dodge R5P7 (2001–2008)

The Dodge R6P8 engine, often referred to as the R6, is a 5.87-liter, naturally aspirated, V8 racing engine, developed and produced by Dodge for competition in NASCAR; from 2008 to 2012.

== Background ==
=== Production and development ===
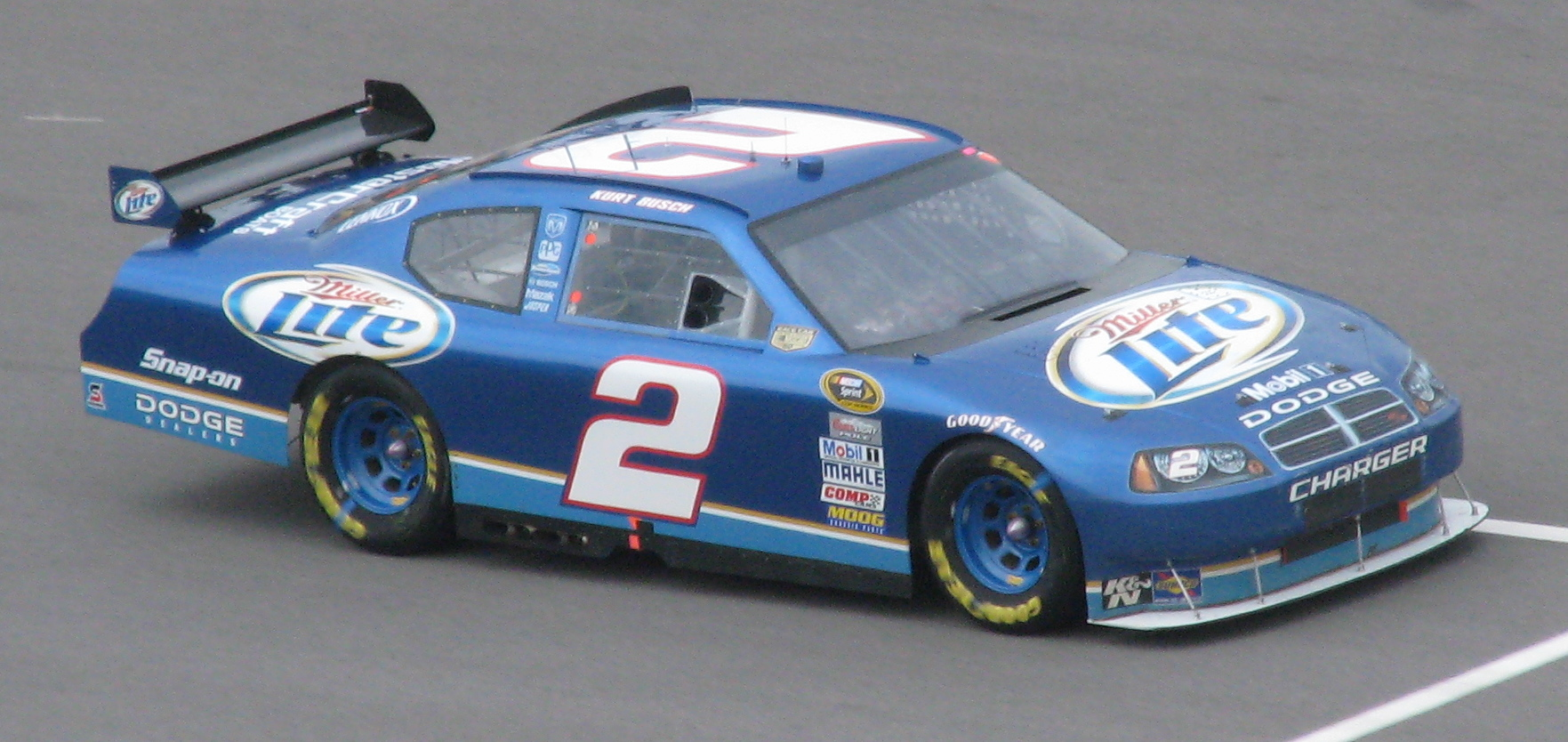
Kurt Busch in 2008, the first driver and team to utilize the R6P8 platform.

The engine made its debut at Kansas in the fall of 2008 in the Camping World RV 400 with Kurt Busch and Team Penske. The team would score a 30th place finish after dealing with handling issues all day, not letting them get a good read on the engine.

After all of Penske's teams used the engine to start out 2009, It would reach other teams by May with Richard Petty Motorsports receiving their first one for use before Dover. In the team's first outing with the motor they would finish 6th in the Autism Speaks 400 with Kasey Kahne.

=== Gen 6 and discontinuation ===
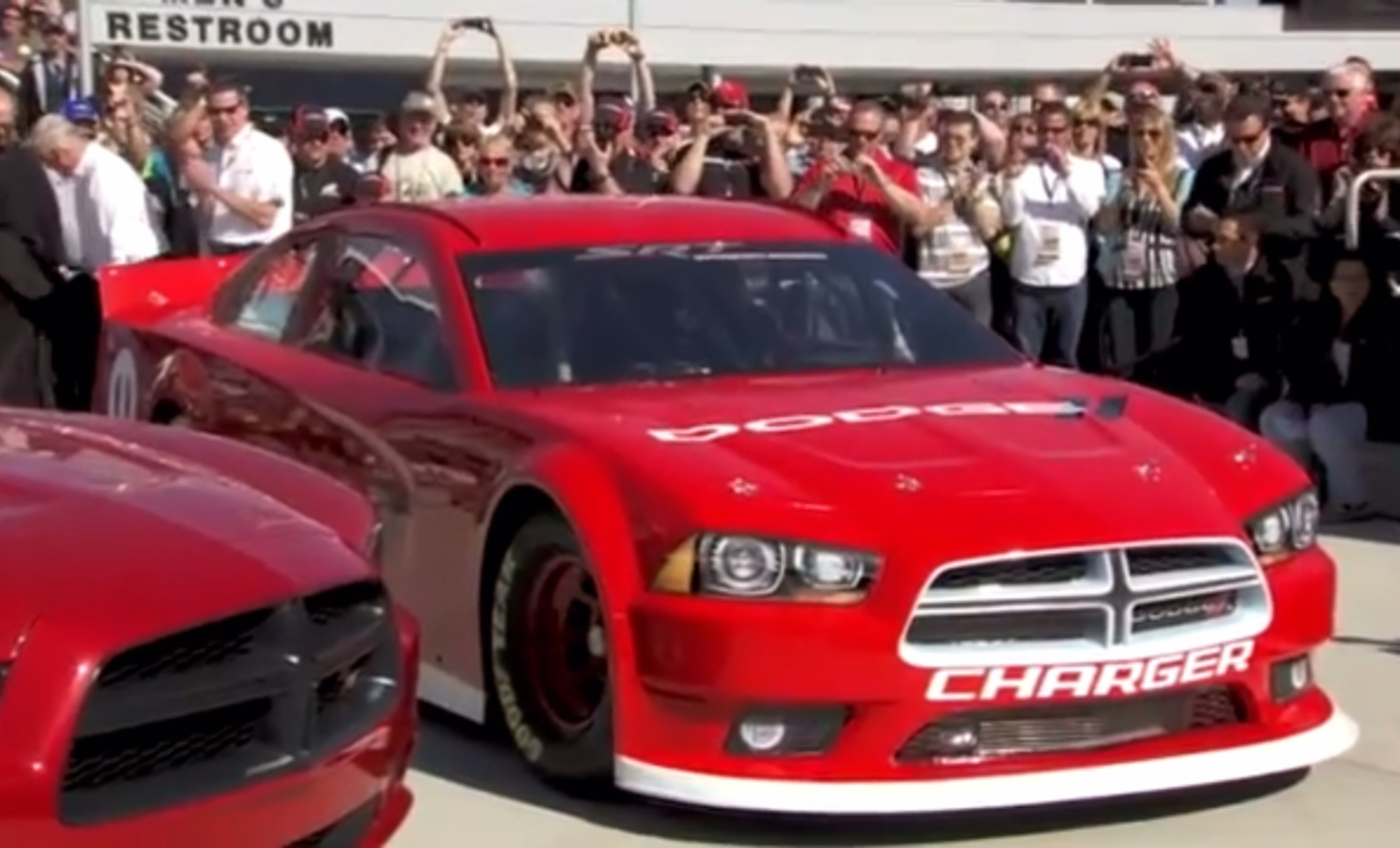
The Gen 6 Charger unveiled by Dodge in March 2012.

In 2012 it was announced their sole builder, Team Penske would switch to Ford for the 2013 season. After this, Dodge would build a Gen 6 car, which they unveiled at Las Vegas on March 10, 2012 with plans to continue using the R6P8 platform. On August 6 that year, Dodge formally announced they would pull out of the sport after having unsuccessfully shopped around for teams for the upcoming season and not being able to find one that fit their criteria.

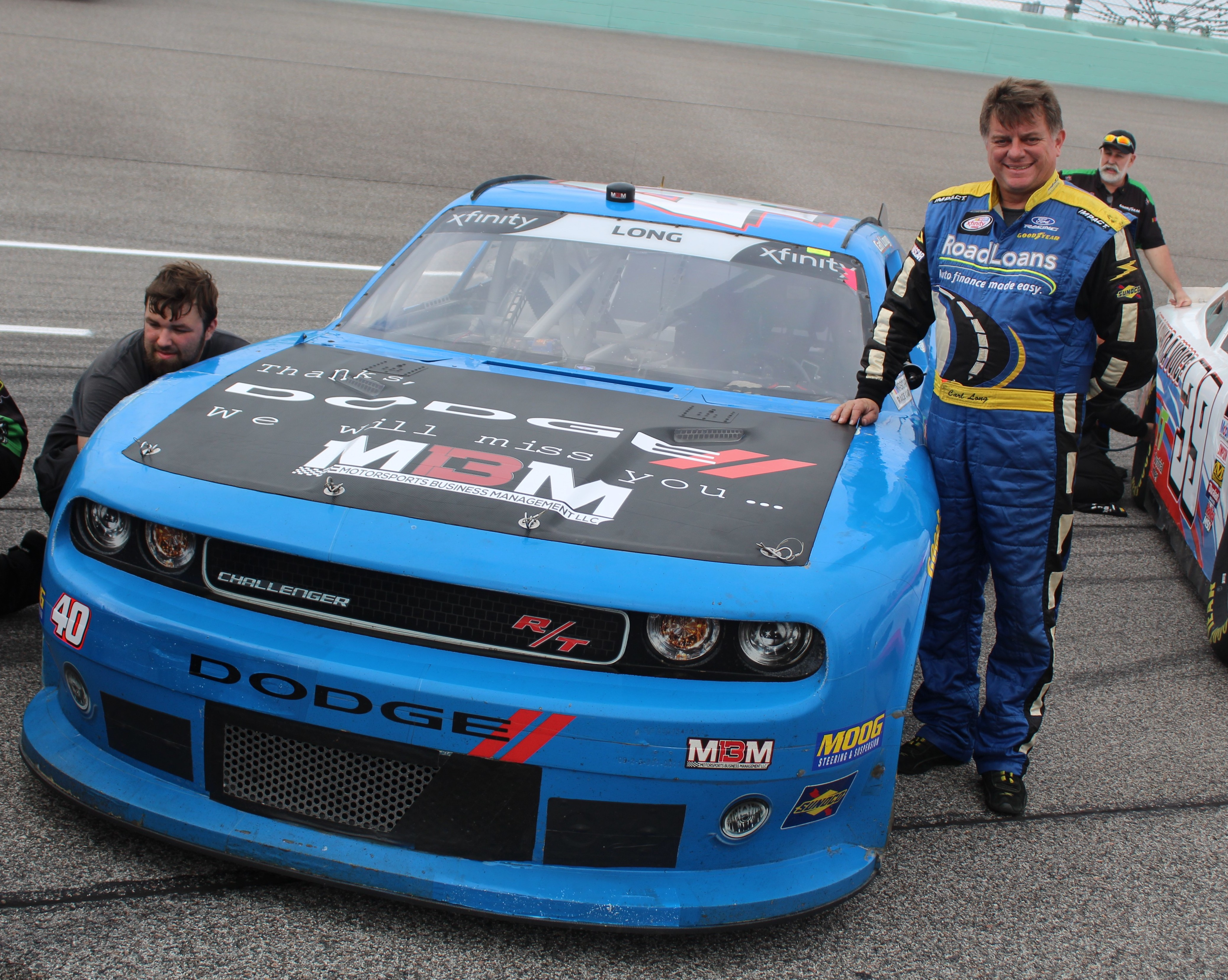
The R6P8 engine continued to be used in Dodge Challengers in the, then NASCAR Xfinity Series until the end of the 2018 season.

From 2013 to 2018, the remaining stock of Dodge bodies and engines would be ran in the, then NASCAR Xfinity Series until 2018 and NASCAR Camping World Truck Series until 2016. The term Zombie Dodge would become a popular term among fans of the sport in this timeframe, due to the cars having zero manufacturer support.

=== Potential return ===
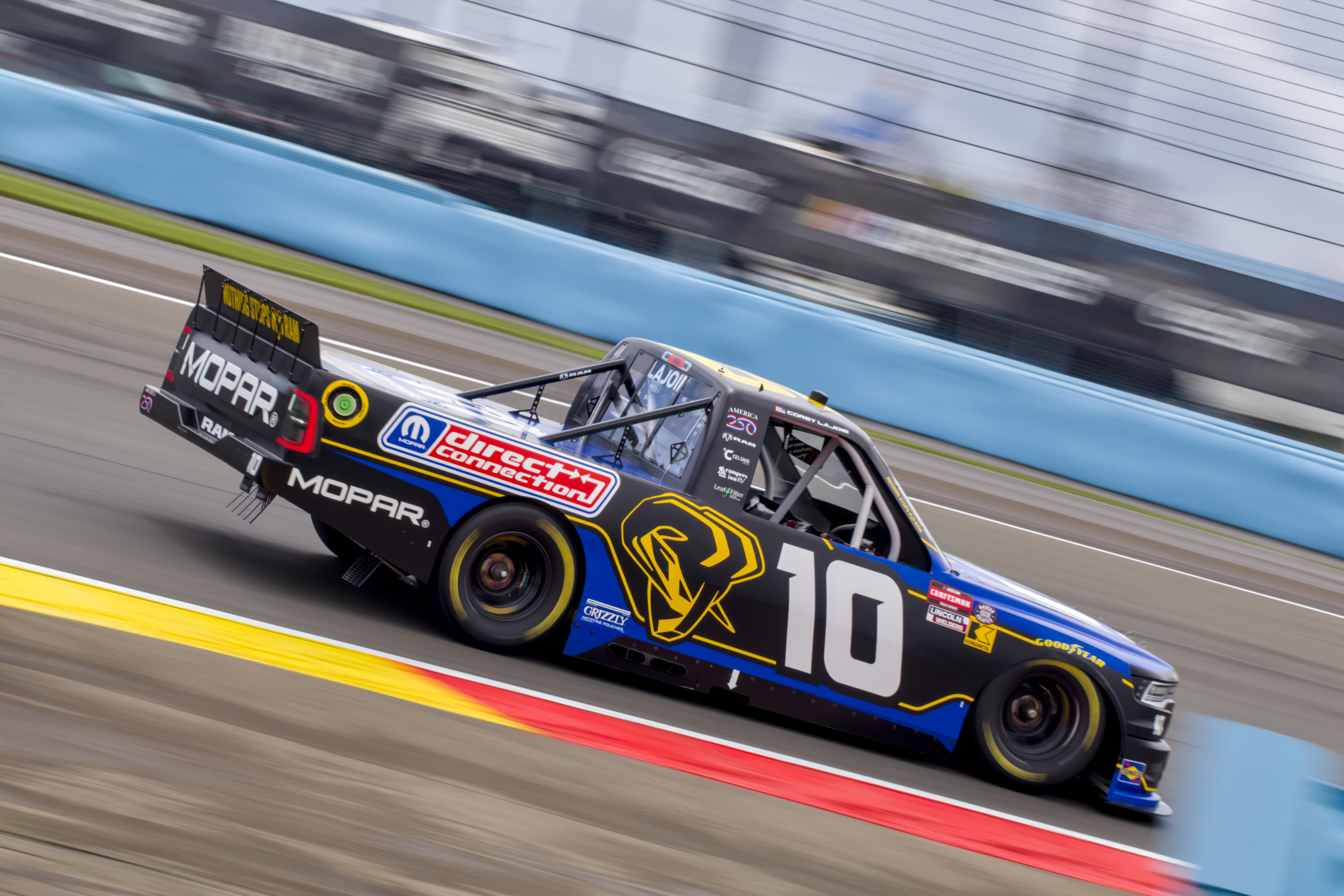
Corey LaJoie driving a Ram at Watkins Glen in 2026.

In Mid-2026, talk began of Dodge coming back to the NASCAR Cup Series for the 2027 season. In multiple reports it was stated the manufacturer had, had a recent breakthrough in the process of manufacturing the engines, and would most likely reuse the R6P8 platform.

== Specifications ==
- Engine type: Dodge V8
- Capacity: 5.87 L (358 cu in)
- HP rating (superspeedway / intermediate / road course / short tracks): 500 hp (373 kW) / 900 hp (671 kW) (2012 rules package)
- Max. RPM: 10,500 rpm
- Weight: 575 lbs. (260 kg)
- Oil system: Dry-sump lubrication
- Camshafts: Solid-roller camshaft
- Valve actuation: Shaft-mounted
- Valve springs: Wire-type
- Cylinder head: 2 valves (titanium) per cylinder
- Fuel injection: MES/NXP Semiconductors/Holley/Bosch 8x high pressure port injectors
- Fuel: 260 GTX Unleaded provided by Sunoco (2007–2010; still in use in ARCA)
  E15 Ethanol provided by Sunoco (2011–2012)
- Lubricants: 0w grade; Mobil 1 Extended Performance (ESP), Pennzoil Platinum, Valvoline Advanced Protection
- Block material: Compacted graphite iron
- Head material: Aluminum alloy
- Crankshaft: Billet steel
- Con rods: Forged steel
- Pistons: Forged aluminum alloy
- Intake systems: Single plenum - aluminum
- Electronic control unit: McLaren Electronics - TAG-400I
- Engine service life: 1,000 miles
- Gearbox: H-pattern

=== Applications ===
- Car of Tomorrow (2008—2012)
- NASCAR O'Reilly Auto Parts Series (2009—2018)
- Asphalt / Dirt Super Late Models — (2008–present)
