= NASCAR on NBC =

Coverage of NASCAR races on NBC Sports

- The fourth and current NASCAR on NBC network TV logo, used on-air since 2023
- Genre: Auto racing telecasts
- Presented by: Leigh Diffey; Jeff Burton; Steve Letarte; (for other reporters and former staff, see broadcast booth section below)
- Theme music composer: Kirk Hammett, James Hetfield & Lars Ulrich (2001–2003); Jess Leary & Anthony Smith (2015–2017); Tom Petty, Jeff Lynne, and Mike Campbell (2018–2019)
- Opening theme: "Fuel" by Metallica (2001–2003); "Bringing Back the Sunshine" by Blake Shelton (2015–2017); "Runnin' Down a Dream" by Tom Petty performed by ZZ Ward (2018–2019); "Race Day" by Yessian (2020); "The Well" by Marcus King (2021–2022); "Woohoo" by TRÏBE (2023–2024); "Highway Star" by Deep Purple (2024); "Space Truckin'" by Deep Purple (2025); "Get What's Coming" by Rival Sons (2026–present)
- Country of origin: United States
- Original language: English
- No. of seasons: 6 (1999–2006 run); 19 (2015–); 25 (as of September 2026)

Production
- Production locations: Various NASCAR racetracks (race telecasts, and pre-race shows); NBC Sports, Stamford, Connecticut (studio segments); NBC Studios, New York City (studio segments)
- Camera setup: Multi-camera
- Running time: Pre-race: 30 minutes to 1 hour; Race: 2.5 to 5 hours (depending on race length)
- Production companies: NBC Sports (1999–2006, 2015–2025); Turner Sports (2001–2006); USA Sports (2026–present)

Original release
- Network: NBC (1979–1981, 1983–1985, 1999–2006, 2015–present); NBCSN (2015–2021); CNBC (2006, 2020, 2022); USA Network (2016, 2022–present); Peacock (2022–present); NBC Sports app & NBC Sports Regional Networks (2015–present); Telemundo (2015–present); Universo (2015–present); TNT (2001–2006, with Turner Sports graphics); Speed (2002–2006, with Speed graphics); The CW (2024)
- Release: 1979 – 1981
- Release: 1983 – 1985
- Release: November 13, 1999 – November 19, 2006
- Release: July 5, 2015 – present

Related
- NASCAR on CBS; NASCAR on TNT; NASCAR on ABC; NASCAR on ESPN (shared with NASCAR on Fox until 2006); NASCAR on TNT; NASCAR on The CW; NASCAR on Prime Video; NASCAR on USA Sports

NASCAR on NBC (visually branded as NBC NASCAR in logos shown within on-air graphics and network promotions) is the branding used for broadcasts of NASCAR races, currently produced by USA Sports, and televised on the NBC broadcast network and Peacock streaming service in the United States. NBC originally aired races, typically during the second half of the season, from November 13, 1999 to November 19, 2006.

On July 23, 2013, NBC signed a new agreement with NASCAR to obtain the rights to races from the NASCAR Cup Series, NASCAR Xfinity Series, ARCA Menards Series East, ARCA Menards Series West and NASCAR Whelen Modified Tour seasons starting in 2015. In addition, NBC Universal also gained the rights to the NASCAR Toyota Series starting in 2014, airing on its Spanish-language network channels initially for selected races, with NBC obtaining Spanish-language rights to all NASCAR series starting in 2015. In 2023, NBC signed a new 7 year agreement effective in 2025 to broadcast the last 14 NASCAR Cup Series races of the season. Beginning in 2026, all 14 races will be produced as part of NASCAR on USA Sports, following the formation of Versant, formed after a spin-off of most of NBCUniversal's cable channels, of which NBC will broadcast only 4 races.

== History ==
Prior to the original 1999 contract between NASCAR and NBC, the network aired races such as the National 500 at Charlotte Motor Speedway from 1979 to 1981, the 1981 Mountain Dew 500 at Pocono International Raceway, the Winston 500 at Alabama International Motor Speedway from 1983 to 1985, and the Miami 300 and Pennzoil 400 at Homestead-Miami Speedway in both 1999 and 2000.

During the 1970s and 1980s, NBC often pre-recorded coverage of NASCAR races, with the edited broadcasts airing as part of the network's sports anthology series Sportsworld.

=== Original run (2001–2006) ===
First NASCAR on NBC logo from the 1999 Pennzoil 400

Second NASCAR on NBC logo from November 12, 2000 to November 19, 2006

Third NASCAR on NBC logo from July 5, 2015 to November 20, 2016

==== Background ====
On November 11, 1999, NASCAR signed a five-year, US$2.48 billion contract which split the American television rights for NASCAR races between Fox, its cable partner FX, NBC and Turner Sports. The contract began in 2001 and went as follows.

- Fox and FX would air races in the first half of the season, with their slate of events coming to an end with the Sonoma event most years.
- NBC would partner with TBS, Turner's long time home for NASCAR, and cover the remainder of the season beginning with the July races.
- As part of the contract, the Daytona 500 would be shared between Fox and NBC. Fox had the rights to the race, as well as the Budweiser Shootout, the Busch Series event, and all qualifying events including the qualifying races, in odd numbered years while NBC would air those events in even numbered years. The network that did not air the Daytona 500 would instead air the Pepsi 400.

As 2001 began, however, Turner Sports decided to make a change to its broadcast arrangement. At the time, Turner Broadcasting was in the midst of a format change for its cable channel TNT that was to make it a drama-centric network. To keep with the branding the network took on, "We Know Drama", Turner Sports decided to make TNT be NBC's cable partner and end the seventeen-year relationship TBS had with NASCAR.

The initial NBC/TNT broadcast team consisted of Allen Bestwick on play-by-play. Bestwick had been tabbed by NBC for its coverage of the first two Cup Series race weekends held at Homestead-Miami Speedway, and had been the lead broadcaster for TBS for the last two years. NBC signed Benny Parsons away from ESPN to serve as lead analyst, and later added former driver Wally Dallenbach Jr. after Dallenbach stepped away from full-time competition following the 2000 season. The lead pit road reporter was Bill Weber, formerly of ESPN. He was joined by fellow ESPN alumni Dave Burns and Matt Yocum, the latter of whom also signed on for Fox’s coverage, and CNNSI motorsports reporter Marty Snider.

In 2006, NBC moved the conclusion of Daytona 500 qualifying to FOX-owned SPEED at 3pm Eastern Time, with NBC graphics and commentary retained. The move was due to conflicts with the 2006 Olympic Winter Games. The postponed Budweiser Shootout was then seen on TNT. It would be the only time that NBC/TNT would carry it's NASCAR coverage on SPEED.

==== Regular segments ====
Some of the regular features of NBC's race coverage were:

- The Aflac Trivia Question, which Benny Parsons always introduced by saying "cue the duck".
- "Wally's World", where Wally Dallenbach would take a lap around the race track. In the earliest form, the segment was an analysis segment where Dallenbach told the viewers what the drivers could expect. Later, he would conduct an interview with a celebrity guest who took the ride with him.
- “Dave Discovers”, in which pit reporter Dave Burns would provide some trivia related to the track, or take part in activities, such as bowling on the high banks of Bristol, or fishing out Wally’s driver signature from a pond at Darlington.
- “Golden Benny Awards”, where Benny Parsons would hand out the “Golden Benny” to someone in the NASCAR community. The segment was retired after the Golden Benny was possessed by “a demon”, and it was destroyed with a hammer by crew chief Frank Stoddard.

During the broadcasts' opening sequence later in the run of the initial contract, a driver can be heard shouting over his radio, "Good job guys, good job." The audio for this clip was taken from Rusty Wallace after his win during the spring 2004 race at Martinsville Speedway.

==== Music ====
The Metallica song "Fuel" was used as the theme song for NBC and TNT's NASCAR broadcasts from mid-2001 to the 2003 season, and was also used for the 2004 Daytona 500 (which aired on NBC), with the song's instrumental backing used as background music and commercial bumpers. However, for part of the 2001 season, the opening scream used in the opening was removed because of its close association with terrorists in the wake of the September 11 attacks. The use of a heavy metal song was intended by producer Sam Flood to create a "rock-and-roll feel, musically, setting the tone for telecasts."

The pre-release version of the song entitled "Fuel For Fire" (with different lyrics) was released as part of the NASCAR Full Throttle CD.

==== NASCAR leaves NBC ====
In October 2005, NBC announced that it might not renew its contract end of the NASCAR contract after the 2006 season, largely because of its acquisition of the Sunday Night Football telecast from ESPN.

The restructured broadcast deal awarded Fox the rights to the Daytona 500 from 2007 until 2014. The contract also allowed ESPN and ABC to regain NASCAR rights, taking the second half of the season's races; meanwhile, TNT retained its broadcast rights and signed a contract to air six mid-season races. The ESPN family of networks became the exclusive home of the NASCAR Busch/Nationwide Series as part of the contract, replacing TNT, NBC, Fox and FX as broadcasters.

As the NFL and NASCAR contracts overlapped during the 2006 Chase for the Nextel Cup, some of NBC's post-race shows were moved to CNBC in order to allow the broadcast network's NFL pre-game show Football Night in America to start on time.

=== NASCAR returns to NBC ===
On July 23, 2013, NASCAR announced a nine-year contract with NBC Sports to broadcast the final 20 races of the NASCAR Cup Series season (from the Coke Zero Sugar 400 at Daytona International Speedway through the Ford EcoBoost 400 at Homestead from 2015 to 2017; in 2018 and 2019, NBC's coverage started at Chicagoland and ended at Homestead and since 2020 starts in Chicagoland and ends at Phoenix), the final 19 races of the Xfinity Series season, along with coverage of select regional series events and the NASCAR Mexico Series, succeeding both former partners TNT and ESPN. The deal also awarded NBC Sports the rights to provide coverage on digital platforms, rights to Spanish-language coverage for Telemundo and mun2 (now Universo), broadcast rights to the NASCAR Hall of Fame induction ceremony and post-season awards banquets. The deal runs from 2015 to 2024, although the Mexico Series race at Phoenix International Raceway began in 2014.

The majority of NBC's NASCAR coverage under the new contract will air on NBCSN (which was swapped to the USA Network after the former network's closure), however seven (ten in 2023 and 2024) races will be broadcast by the NBC broadcast network; in 2015 and 2016, they were the Coke Zero Sugar 400, the Bojangles' Southern 500 at Darlington, the Chase races at Charlotte and Kansas, and the last three races (Texas, Phoenix and Homestead-Miami) consecutively.

NBC Sports took over the portion of the contract previously held by ESPN and Turner Sports. While financial details were not disclosed, NBC reportedly paid 50% more than the $2.7 billion paid by ESPN and Turner combined under the previous contract.

Former Turner Sports executive Jeff Behnke serves as vice president of NASCAR programming for NBC Sports.

NBC began to lead into its new contract in February 2014 with the premiere of a nightly news and analysis program, NASCAR America, on NBCSN, and a broadcast of the Toyota 120 from Phoenix International Raceway – the opening event of the 2014 season of the NASCAR Toyota Series, on mun2.

On February 3, 2015, NBC Sports announced an agreement to air 39 regional series races from the ARCA Menards Series East and West, Whelen Modified Tour and Whelen Southern Modified Tour on NBCSN.

The first U.S.-series race under the contract was The Hart to Heart Breast Cancer Foundation 150—the first race of the 2015 NASCAR K&N Pro Series East season—at New Smyrna Speedway, and was aired on February 19 on NBCSN.

During Summer Olympic years (three during the contract, in 2016, 2021, and 2024), NBC will assign different NBCUniversal channels to air races as a result of scheduling conflicts. For 2016, CNBC (used for English Premier League, IndyCar, and Formula One for NBCSN conflicts) carried Sprint Cup and Xfinity qualifying along with one Xfinity race, and USA Network (which will also be used for Premier League conflicts) carried two Xfinity and one Sprint Cup race. In 2021, the Cup Series schedule took two weeks off from competition to minimize any conflict with the Olympics; the Watkins Glen race ran on the day of the Games' closing ceremony. The one Xfinity Series race that occurred during the Games (at Watkins Glen) aired on CNBC, in 2024 the cup series once again took two weeks off to minimize conflict with the games and aired a Cup Series race on USA Network during the closing ceremony of the games, however the Xfinity series will also do the same for three weeks, with no races of any NASCAR series airing during the Olympics. If a NASCAR race is postponed to Monday and it conflicts with an English Premier League match, the race will move to USA (CNBC is also unavailable on weekdays due to its stock market coverage), though this has not happened yet as of the end of the 2020 season.

==== COVID-19 pandemic impact, NBCSN's closure and move to USA Sports ====
In 2020, due to the COVID-19 pandemic, the NBC team initially broadcast all races from the broadcast booth at Charlotte Motor Speedway with only 2-3 pit reporters onsite. Although NBC has a small studio in Charlotte for NASCAR America segments, the studio was deemed too small to be able to do race broadcasts and maintain social distancing. For the Indianapolis race weekend, Mike Tirico hosted from the track; Tirico lives close enough to Indianapolis he was able to drive to the track to host. For the final 5 races of the season (starting with the Charlotte Roval Race) the NBC on-air team resumed travel to race sites.

NASCAR America stopped airing when the pandemic began and has not yet returned to air. NBC has cited other conflicting live events as the reason the program has not returned to air; NBCSN aired the 2020 Stanley Cup playoffs throughout the show's timeslot in July and August. The show now airs only as a pre-race and post-race show with some airings on Peacock.

On January 22, 2021, an internal memo sent by NBC Sports president Pete Bevacqua announced that NBCSN would cease operations by the end of the year, and that USA Network would begin "carrying and/or simulcasting certain NBC Sports programming," including the Stanley Cup playoffs and NASCAR races, before NBCSN's shutdown. Peacock, NBCUniversal's new streaming service, would also carry some of the network's former programming starting in 2022. The move was cited by industry analysts as a response to the impact of the COVID-19 pandemic on the sports and television industries, the acceleration of cord-cutting, as well as formidable competition from rival sports networks such as ESPN and Fox Sports 1.

On November 29, 2023, NBC extended its contract through 2031; beginning in the 2025 season, NBC's coverage was significantly reduced, consisting of only the final 14 races of the Cup Series season. The rights to the Xfinity Series moved exclusively to The CW. On April 11, 2024, as part of a sublicensing agreement serving as a prelude to the new contract, it was announced that the final eight races of the 2024 NASCAR Xfinity Series would be moved to The CW, with NBC Sports producing the broadcasts.

On November 12, 2025, it was announced that USA Sports, formed after NBCUniversal spun off most of their cable business as Versant, would receive NBC's portion of the Cup Series schedule beginning in 2026. For that year, USA would air 10 of the races, while the broadcasts for the summer Daytona race and the final three races of the season, including the Cup Series Championship, would still air on NBC but be produced by USA Sports.

==== Commentators ====
On December 3, 2013, Jeff Burton was confirmed as the first member of the broadcast team and is one of the color commentators.

On December 4, 2013, Rick Allen, who previously worked at Fox Sports as an announcer for its NASCAR Craftsman Truck Series coverage as well as for several Xfinity Series races, signed a multi-year contract to serve as the lead announcer for NBC's race broadcasts, a position he held until Michigan in August 2024.

On January 9, 2014, it was confirmed that Steve Letarte would leave his role as Dale Earnhardt Jr.'s crew chief at Hendrick Motorsports and join NBC Sports as a color analyst. Behnke explained that the on-air makeup of NBC Sports' broadcasts would have "a relevancy that hasn't been seen in a long, long time", citing the recent involvements of both Burton and Letarte in NASCAR prior to their move to broadcasting.

On June 1, 2015, Brian Vickers announced via Twitter that he would be joining the telecasts of the New Hampshire and Michigan races.

Leigh Diffey, lead announcer for NBC's IndyCar coverage, announced via Twitter he would be commentating at some Xfinity races for NBC. Additionally, Diffey would be lead announcer for the Cup races at Watkins Glen & Michigan in 2017.

The pit reporters for 2018 consisted of Dave Burns, Marty Snider, Kelli Stavast, Parker Kligerman (who replaced Mike Massaro following the 2016 season), and Ralph Sheheen, Burns and Snider were with NBC's original NASCAR pit crew, while Massaro joins from ESPN's NASCAR team and Stavast from the network's sports car coverage. The pre-race show was hosted by former Fox reporter Krista Voda along with former ESPN analyst Dale Jarrett, former TNT analyst Kyle Petty, and Top Gear host Rutledge Wood.

On April 15, 2015, it was announced that Ralph Sheheen and Ray Evernham would be part of the booth of the NBCSN telecasts of the Whelen Modified Tour and Whelen Southern Modified Tour.

On September 1, 2015, it was announced that Ken Squier and Ned Jarrett would commentate a portion of the 2015 Bojangles' Southern 500 along with current NASCAR on NBC commentator Dale Jarrett. Squier was also in the broadcast booth for Sprint Cup Series final practice. This has become a standard tradition at the Southern 500, due to NASCAR designating the race as a throwback weekend where teams bring retro paint schemes to the track.

On September 11, 2015, it was announced that Carl Edwards would be in the NBCSN broadcast booth as a guest analyst for the Xfinity race at Richmond alongside Dale Jarrett and Diffey. Jamie McMurray was a guest analyst for the NXS race at Chicagoland.

On July 24, 2017, it was announced that Dale Earnhardt Jr. would join the NASCAR on NBC broadcasting team for the 2018 season, incidentally reuniting with his former crew chief Letarte.

In November 2017, it was announced that Bob Costas would co-anchor NBC's pre-race coverage leading into the NASCAR Cup Series finale from Homestead. alongside Krista Voda, Similarly, in the 2018 Cup race at Daytona, NBC's Mike Tirico appeared on the pre-race show.

In July 2019, it was announced that Danielle Trotta will join NBC Sports’ NASCAR coverage as host of the “Victory Lap” post-race show for select Cup Series races this year.

On July 28, 2020, it was announced that Brad Daugherty would be an analyst for NASCAR on NBC from the first Michigan International Speedway race onwards. At the conclusion of the 2020 season, Krista Voda revealed on social media she would not be returning to NBC. Voda stated NBC had elected to eliminate her position from race broadcasts.

On February 29, 2024, The Athletic reported that Dale Earnhardt Jr., whose contract with NBC expired after the 2023 season, would reportedly be leaving NBC for Amazon and TNT's new NASCAR coverage in the next TV contract that starts in 2025.

On March 13, 2024, it was announced that Leigh Diffey would replace Allen as the Cup Series play-by-play. Diffey's first race was the 2024 Coke Zero Sugar 400.

On May 14, 2024, it was officially announced that Jimmie Johnson would join the NASCAR on NBC team as a color commentator for two races in 2024. However, he ended up being a studio analyst from the NBC Peacock Pit Box for those races instead of in the booth.

==== Music and graphics ====
While Fox Sports innovated the practice of using the team's number fonts (such as the Petty #43 or Jeff Gordon's #24) in their on-screen graphics, NBC took the next step by using these fonts in the running order graphic at the top of the screen, starting with the 2001 Pepsi 400. This was only used for Winston Cup broadcasts on NBC, while TNT races and all Busch Series races (regardless of network) used a generic font with a blue background. This practice was dropped after the inaugural race at Kansas, and starting at Charlotte all then-Winston Cup Series broadcasts used a generic font in the running order with a limited number of background colors to roughly correspond with the car. The accurate colors and fonts returned when NBC's coverage resumed in 2015, and by then this had become common practice for most TV networks for major auto racing series.

In 2018, a new secondary leaderboard graphic was introduced and is displayed vertically on the left side of the screen, essentially the same thing as the graphic introduced in Fox’s coverage earlier that year. However, unlike with Fox, NBC only used this leaderboard during portions of the race depending on the camera angles and picture or if they wanted to show more of the field on the leaderboard (up to 20 cars) at a time (with the leaderboard on the top of the screen, NBC only shows four cars at a time), whereas Fox used it for the entire race regardless of camera angles and picture (as of 2025, the latter of which is now also used by NBC).

From 2015–17, the intro for the revived run of NASCAR on NBC was "Bringing Back the Sunshine" performed by country music artist Blake Shelton, who is also one of the coaches on NBC's own prime time hit show, The Voice. NBC introduced a new opening for their coverage starting in 2018, using a cover version of the Tom Petty song "Runnin' Down a Dream", done by ZZ Ward. No theme was used in 2020; the theme was accompanied by a video featuring fans, NBC executives cited that airing the theme when there were no fans in attendance at races would be inappropriate. In 2021, singer Marcus King used his song "The Well" for the new opening theme song. In 2023 and 2024, "Woohoo" by Jordan Baum was used as the intro song, but for the NASCAR Cup Series in 2024, it was Highway Star by Deep Purple and was only used 3 times that year.

NBC's peacock logo bug turns green, yellow, red, or white when the respective racing flag is deployed. (This feature is absent on USA Network). This feature was removed in 2025.

Starting with the Cup Series race in Iowa, which aired on USA Network on August 3, 2025, NBC debuted a new dedicated graphics package specific to its NASCAR coverage. This was the first time NBC had updated its graphics since the aforementioned resumption of the network's NASCAR coverage a decade earlier. NBC's (and USA Sports') NASCAR graphics package is now shared with NASCAR on Prime Video, albeit with the usage of different fonts.

== On-air staff ==
=== Broadcast booth ===
==== Lap-by-lap announcers ====
- Leigh Diffey – 2015–2017, 2024–present

==== Color commentators ====
- Jeff Burton – 2015–present
- Steve Letarte – 2015–present

=== Pre-race and post-race shows ===
- Marty Snider – pre and post-race show host (2021–present)
- Dale Jarrett – rotating analyst (2015–present)
- Brad Daugherty – rotating analyst (2020–present)

=== Pit reporters ===
- Trevor Bayne (2025–present)
- Dave Burns (2000–2006, 2015–present)
- Kim Coon (2022–present)
- Marty Snider (1999–2006, 2015–present)

=== Former ===
- Rick Allen – lap-by-lap announcer (2015–2024)
- Mike Bagley – commentator for the radio-style broadcasts on road courses (2017–2019, 2021–2024)
- Allen Bestwick – lap-by-lap announcer/pit reporter (1999–2006)
- Ato Boldon – roving reporter (2017)
- Ricky Carmichael – guest color commentator at Darlington only (2021)
- Landon Cassill – fill-in pit reporter, Xfinity Series standalone races (2018)
- Jac Collinsworth – pre-race show host/roving reporter (2021)
- Bob Costas – guest host for pre-race show at Cup race at Homestead only (2017)
- Lindsay Czarniak – pit reporter (2005–2006)
- Wally Dallenbach Jr. – color analyst (2001–2006)
- Dale Earnhardt Jr. – color analyst (2018–2023)
- Carl Edwards – guest color commentator at Richmond only (2015)
- Brendan Gaughan – fill-in pit reporter, Xfinity Series standalone races (2018)
- Joe Gibbs – color commentator (1999)
- Alex Hayden – fill-in pit reporter, Xfinity Series standalone races (2015–2016)
- Jesse Iwuji – pit reporter for Cup and Xfinity Series at Daytona in July only (2019) and select Xfinity Series races (2020)
- Ned Jarrett – guest color commentator at Darlington only (2015–2017)
- Parker Kligerman – analyst and pit reporter (2015–2025)
- Carolyn Manno – NASCAR Victory Lap host (2015–2018)
- Mike Massaro – pit reporter (1999-2000; 2015–2016)
- Jamie McMurray – guest color commentator at Chicagoland only (2015)
- Jim Noble – fill-in pit reporter, Xfinity Series standalone races (2015–2016)
- Benny Parsons – color commentator (2000–2006)
- Kyle Petty – rotating analyst (2015–2025)
- Dorsey Schroeder – pit reporter (1999)
- Ken Squier – guest lap-by-lap announcer at Darlington only (2015–2017) (deceased)
- Kelli Stavast – pit reporter (2015–2021)
- Mike Tirico – guest host for pre-race show at Cup race at Daytona in July only (2018), Indianapolis in July only (2020)
- Danielle Trotta - NASCAR Victory Lap host (2019)
- Krista Voda – pre and post-race show host (2015–2020)
- Mike Wallace – color commentator (1999)
- Bill Weber – host/pit reporter/lap-by-lap announcer (2001–2006) (deceased)
- Brian Williams – host (1999)
- Rutledge Wood – roving/specialty reporter (2015–2022)
- Dillon Welch – pit reporter (2018–2025)

Preceded by CBS	Daytona 500 television broadcaster 2001–2006 (even-numbered years only; Fox aired the Daytona 500 in odd numbered years)	Succeeded by Fox
Preceded by ABC	NASCAR pay television carrier in the United States; 1999–2006 (shared with Fox from 2001–2006; and TNT from 2001–2006)	Succeeded by ESPN
Preceded by ESPN/TNT	NASCAR pay television carrier in the United States; 2015–present (shared with Fox, Prime Video and TNT Sports)	Succeeded by Incumbent
