= 2015 in NASCAR =

In 2015, NASCAR sanctioned three national series, and five touring series.

== National series ==
- 2015 NASCAR Sprint Cup Series – The top racing series in NASCAR
- 2015 NASCAR Xfinity Series – The second-highest racing series in NASCAR
- 2015 NASCAR Camping World Truck Series – The third-highest racing series in NASCAR

== Touring series ==
- 2015 NASCAR K&N Pro Series West – One of the two K&N Pro Series
- 2015 NASCAR K&N Pro Series East – One of the two K&N Pro Series
- 2015 NASCAR Whelen Modified Tour – One of the two modified tours in NASCAR
- 2015 NASCAR Whelen Southern Modified Tour – One of the two modified tours in NASCAR
- 2015 NASCAR Canadian Tire Series – The top NASCAR racing series in Canada
- 2015 NASCAR Mexico Series – The top NASCAR racing series in Mexico
- 2015 NASCAR Whelen Euro Series – The top NASCAR racing series in Europe

Preceded by 2014 in NASCAR	NASCAR seasons 2015	Succeeded by 2016 in NASCAR
