= 2016 in NASCAR =

In 2016, NASCAR sanctioned three national series, and six touring series.

== National series ==
- 2016 NASCAR Sprint Cup Series – The top racing series in NASCAR
- 2016 NASCAR Xfinity Series – The second-highest racing series in NASCAR
- 2016 NASCAR Camping World Truck Series – The third-highest racing series in NASCAR

== Touring series ==
- 2016 NASCAR K&N Pro Series West – One of the two K&N Pro Series
- 2016 NASCAR K&N Pro Series East – One of the two K&N Pro Series
- 2016 NASCAR Whelen Modified Tour – One of the two modified tours in NASCAR
- 2016 NASCAR Whelen Southern Modified Tour – One of the two modified tours in NASCAR
- 2016 NASCAR Pinty's Series – The top NASCAR racing series in Canada
- 2016 NASCAR Whelen Euro Series – The top NASCAR racing series in Europe

Preceded by 2015 in NASCAR	NASCAR seasons 2016	Succeeded by 2017 in NASCAR
