= Super Weekend at the Brickyard =

Racing event series in Speedway, Indiana

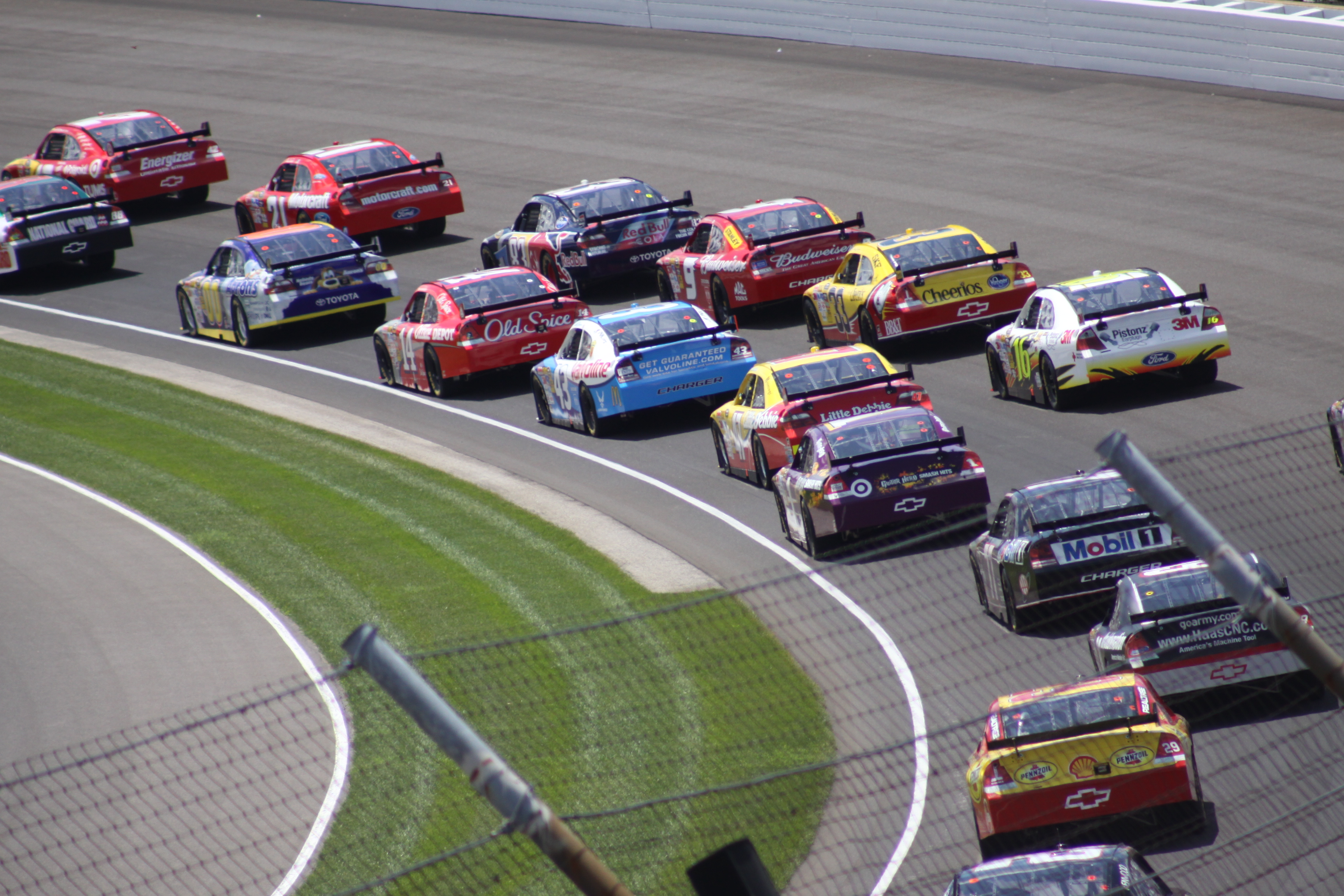
The NASCAR Brickyard 400 is the highlight of Super Weekend.

Kroger Super Weekend at the Brickyard was a series of auto races held at the Indianapolis Motor Speedway in late July, surrounding the annual Brickyard 400. The weekend of events included the following races:

- NASCAR Xfinity Series — Pennzoil 250
- NASCAR Cup Series — Brickyard 400

The naming rights are owned by grocery chain Kroger.

== History ==
=== Brickyard 400 ===
The NASCAR Winston Cup Series debuted at the Indianapolis Motor Speedway in 1994. At the time, no official support races were part of the schedule. The Busch Series, however, did hold the Kroger 200 at Indianapolis Raceway Park in nearby Clermont, Indiana the same weekend. From 1995–2011, the Truck Series also held a race at IRP.

=== "Super Weekend" ===
On September 3, 2009, Grand-Am tested on the combined road course at the Indianapolis Motor Speedway as a potential future venue. A total of nine cars, representing both the Daytona Prototype and GT classes, participated. Laps were run in a clockwise direction (like Formula 1 at this track, and unlike MotoGP). For most of the test, the southwest turn of the oval was used (as it had been with Formula 1). A brief period in the middle of the day (approximately 20 minutes) was spent turning laps that included the southwest MotoGP road course section.

On July 6, 2011, at a press conference held at the start-finish line, officials with the speedway, NASCAR, and the Grand American Road Racing Association announced the new Super Weekend at the Brickyard taking place July 26–29, 2012. The NASCAR Nationwide Series moved from Lucas Oil Raceway at Indianapolis to the Brickyard to run a Saturday race while both the Rolex Sports Car Series and the Continental Tire Sports Car Challenge would now run races on Friday. Further, the Rolex race is the conclusion of the new North American Endurance Challenge, a triple crown event along with the 24 Hours of Daytona and the 6 Hours of Watkins Glen. The 2012 race weekend was the first time in speedway history that races took place on the 2.5-mile oval and 2.534-mile Grand Prix road course during the same weekend. The move has been done to counter declining attendance during the Brickyard 400. Some Cup series regulars took part in the Rolex Sports Car Series races. The NASCAR Camping World Truck Series race at Lucas Oil Raceway was also discontinued.

The move of the Nationwide Series race from Lucas Oil Raceway to the Brickyard came with much criticism. Lucas Oil Raceway sold out every race in the 28 years it held a Busch Series/Nationwide Series race while offering exciting short track racing on the track, while many fans consider racing at the Brickyard "boring."

The sports car endurance race was put on hiatus after 2014. Track and series officials noted very low attendance for the Friday afternoon event, and considered moving the sports cars to their own stand-alone event. As of 2017, the sports cars have not returned. As a result, use of the "Super Weekend" moniker has since diminished.
