= 2014 in NASCAR =

In 2014, NASCAR sanctioned three national series, and five touring series.

== National series ==
- 2014 NASCAR Sprint Cup Series – The top racing series in NASCAR
- 2014 NASCAR Nationwide Series – The second highest racing series in NASCAR
- 2014 NASCAR Camping World Truck Series – The third highest racing series in NASCAR

== Touring series ==
- 2014 NASCAR K&N Pro Series West – One of the two K&N Pro Series
- 2014 NASCAR K&N Pro Series East – One of the two K&N Pro Series
- 2014 NASCAR Whelen Modified Tour – One of the two modified tours in NASCAR
- 2014 NASCAR Whelen Southern Modified Tour – One of the two modified tours in NASCAR
- 2014 NASCAR Canadian Tire Series season – The top NASCAR racing series in Canada
- 2014 NASCAR Toyota Series season – The top NASCAR racing series in Mexico
- 2014 NASCAR Whelen Euro Series season – The top NASCAR racing series in Europe

Preceded by 2013 in NASCAR	NASCAR seasons 2014	Succeeded by 2015 in NASCAR
