= 2017 in NASCAR =

In 2017, NASCAR sanctioned three national series and six touring series.

== National series ==
- 2017 Monster Energy NASCAR Cup Series – The top racing series in NASCAR
- 2017 NASCAR Xfinity Series – The second-highest racing series in NASCAR
- 2017 NASCAR Camping World Truck Series – The third-highest racing series in NASCAR

== Touring series ==
- 2017 NASCAR K&N Pro Series West – One of the two K&N Pro Series
- 2017 NASCAR K&N Pro Series East – One of the two K&N Pro Series
- 2017 NASCAR Whelen Modified Tour – The modified tour of NASCAR
- 2017 NASCAR Pinty's Series – The top NASCAR racing series in Canada
- 2017 NASCAR PEAK Mexico Series – The top NASCAR racing series in Mexico
- 2017 NASCAR Whelen Euro Series – The top NASCAR racing series in Europe

Preceded by 2016 in NASCAR	NASCAR seasons 2017	Succeeded by 2018 in NASCAR
