= 2020 in NASCAR =

In 2020, NASCAR sanctioned four national series:

- 2020 NASCAR Cup Series – the top racing series in NASCAR
- 2020 NASCAR Xfinity Series – the second-highest racing series in NASCAR
- 2020 NASCAR Gander RV & Outdoors Truck Series – the third-highest racing series in NASCAR
- 2020 ARCA Menards Series – the top racing series in ARCA (owned by NASCAR)

== Touring series ==
- eNASCAR iRacing Pro Invitational Series – The iRacing series that all-stars competed in during the COVID-19 pandemic.
- 2020 ARCA Menards Series West – One of the two regional ARCA Series
- 2020 ARCA Menards Series East – One of the two regional ARCA Series
- 2020 NASCAR Whelen Modified Tour – The modified tour of NASCAR
- 2020 NASCAR Whelen Euro Series – The top NASCAR racing series in Europe

Preceded by 2019 in NASCAR	NASCAR seasons 2020	Succeeded by 2021 in NASCAR
