= 2008 in motorsport =

The following is an overview of the events of 2008 in motorsport including the major racing events, motorsport venues that were opened and closed during a year, championships and non-championship events that were established and disestablished in a year, and births and deaths of racing drivers and other motorsport people.

== Annual events ==
The calendar includes only annual major non-championship events or annual events that had significance separate from the championship. For the dates of the championship events see related season articles.

Date	Event	Ref
26–27 January	46th 24 Hours of Daytona	
17 February	50th Daytona 500	
24–25 May	36th 24 Hours of Nurburgring	
25 May	66th Monaco Grand Prix	
25 May	92nd Indianapolis 500	
24 May-7 June	90th Isle of Man TT	
14–15 June	76th 24 Hours of Le Mans	
27 July	31st Suzuka 8 Hours	
2–3 August	60th 24 Hours of Spa	
10 August	18th Masters of Formula 3	
12 October	51st Supercheap Auto Bathurst 1000	
16 November	55th Macau Grand Prix	
14 December	21st Race of Champions	

== Established championships/events ==
Last race	Championship	Ref
31 August	Superleague Formula	

== Disestablished championships/events ==
Last race	Championship	Ref
21 September	SEAT Cupra Championship	

== Deaths ==
Date	Month	Name	Age	Nationality	Occupation	Note	Ref
6	February	Tony Rolt	89	British	Racing driver and engineer	24 Hours of Le Mans winner (1953).	
23	February	Paul Frère	91	Belgian	Racing driver	24 Hours of Le Mans winner (1960).	
27	March	Jean-Marie Balestre	86	French	Auto racing executive administrator	The 9th FIA president	
13	June	Ove Andersson	70	Swedish	Rally driver	1975 Safari Rally winner.	
28	August	Phil Hill	81	American	Racing driver	Formula One World Champion (1961). 24 Hours of Le Mans winner (1958, 1961-1962).	

== See also ==
- List of 2008 motorsport champions
