= 2011 in NASCAR =

The following NASCAR national series were held in 2011:

- 2011 NASCAR Sprint Cup Series – The top racing series in NASCAR
- 2011 NASCAR Nationwide Series – The second-highest racing series in NASCAR
- 2011 NASCAR Camping World Truck Series – The third-highest racing series in NASCAR
- 2011 NASCAR Corona Series – Primary series of NASCAR Mexico
- 2011 NASCAR Stock V6 Series – Secondary series of NASCAR Mexico

| Preceded by 2010 in NASCAR | NASCAR seasons 2011 | Succeeded by 2012 in NASCAR |
