= 2013 in NASCAR =

The following NASCAR national series were sanctioned in 2013:

- 2013 NASCAR Sprint Cup Series – The top racing series in NASCAR
- 2013 NASCAR Nationwide Series – The second-highest racing series in NASCAR
- 2013 NASCAR Camping World Truck Series – The third-highest racing series in NASCAR

Preceded by 2012 in NASCAR	NASCAR seasons 2013	Succeeded by 2014 in NASCAR
