= 2019 in NASCAR =

For 2019, NASCAR sanctioned three national series and six regional touring series:

== National series ==
- 2019 Monster Energy NASCAR Cup Series – The top racing series in NASCAR.
- 2019 NASCAR Xfinity Series – The second-highest racing series in NASCAR.
- 2019 NASCAR Gander Outdoors Truck Series – The third-highest racing series in NASCAR.

== Touring series ==
- 2019 NASCAR K&N Pro Series West – One of the two K&N Pro Series
- 2019 NASCAR K&N Pro Series East – One of the two K&N Pro Series
- 2019 NASCAR Whelen Modified Tour – The modified tour of NASCAR
- 2019 NASCAR Pinty's Series – The top NASCAR racing series in Canada
- 2019 NASCAR PEAK Mexico Series – The top NASCAR racing series in Mexico
- 2019 NASCAR Whelen Euro Series – The top NASCAR racing series in Europe.

Preceded by 2018 in NASCAR	NASCAR seasons 2019	Succeeded by 2020 in NASCAR
