= 2012 in NASCAR =

The following NASCAR national series were held in 2012:

- 2012 NASCAR Sprint Cup Series – The top racing series in American NASCAR
- 2012 NASCAR Nationwide Series – The second-highest racing series in American NASCAR
- 2012 NASCAR Camping World Truck Series – The third-highest racing series in American NASCAR
- 2012 NASCAR Canadian Tire Series season – The top racing series in Canadian NASCAR
- 2012 NASCAR Toyota Series season – The top racing series in Mexican NASCAR
- 2012 NASCAR Stock V6 Series – The second-highest racing series in Mexican NASCAR

Preceded by 2011 in NASCAR	NASCAR seasons 2012	Succeeded by 2013 in NASCAR
