= List of NASCAR Cup Series champions =

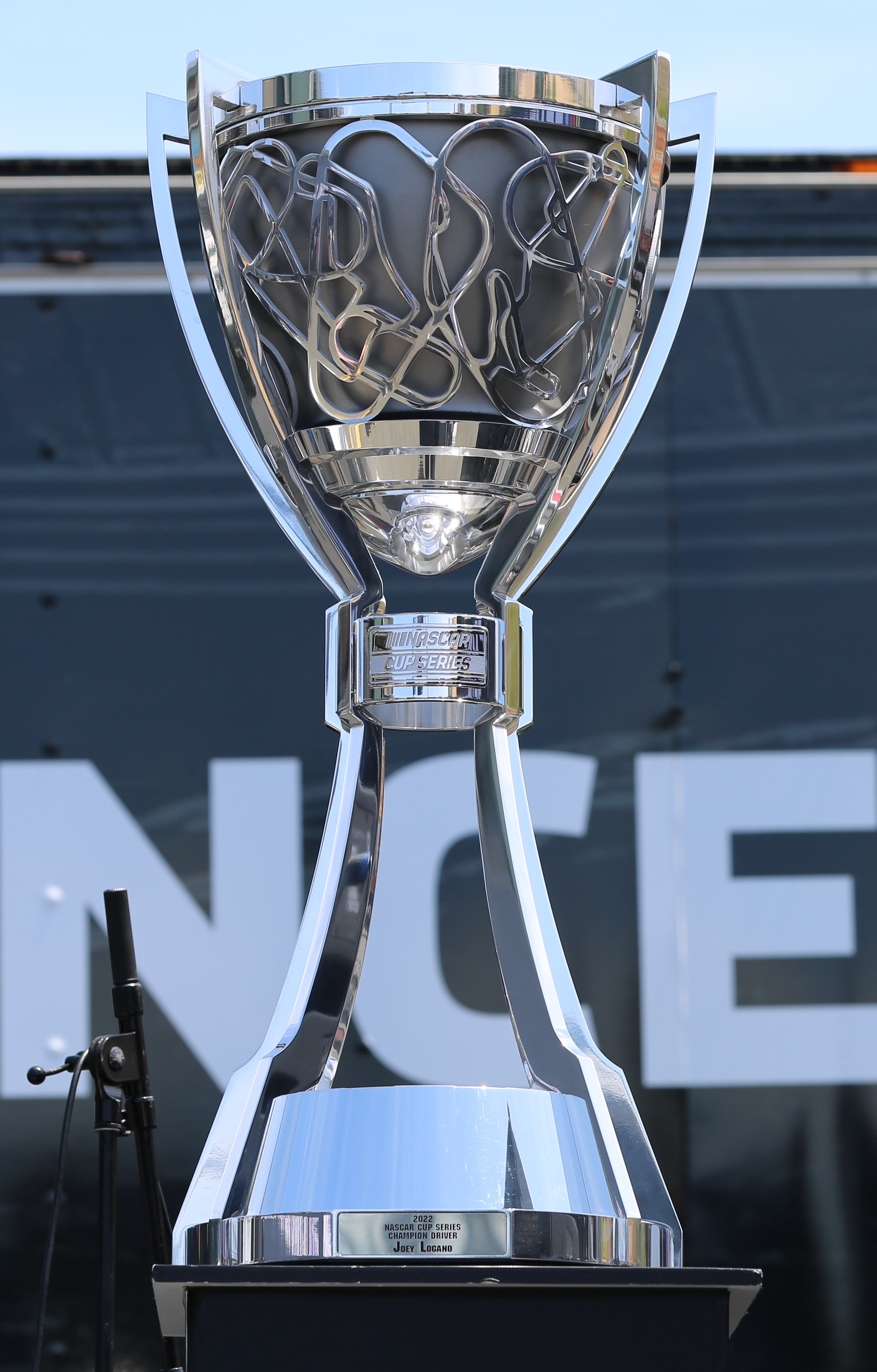
The current NASCAR Cup Series trophy, the Bill France Cup

The NASCAR Cup Series Drivers' Championship is awarded by the chairman of NASCAR to the most successful NASCAR Cup Series racing car driver over a season, as determined by a points system based on race results. The Drivers' Championship was first awarded in 1949 to Red Byron. The first driver to win multiple Championships was Herb Thomas in 1951 and 1953. The current Drivers' Champion is Kyle Larson, who won his third NASCAR Cup Series championship in 2026.

The NASCAR points system has undergone several incarnations since its initial implementation. Originally, races awarded points by a complicated system based upon final positioning and weighted by prize money purses, such that higher-paying events gave more points. Soon after the advent of the modern era in 1972, the championship was decided by a more basic cumulative point total based solely upon a driver's finishing position in each race. In order to reduce the possibility of a driver clinching before the final event, NASCAR implemented the "Chase for the Cup" in 2004 which, with minor modifications from 2004 to 2013, more radical changes in 2014 and a simpler revamp in 2026, stands as the current format. Before the final ten races, the top 16 drivers, based exclusively on points, have their points reset to an amount based on their position prior to the reset. With these changes, the last Drivers' Champion to clinch before the final race was Matt Kenseth in 2003.

Overall, thirty-six different drivers have won the Championship, with Richard Petty, Dale Earnhardt, and Jimmie Johnson holding the record for most titles at seven. Johnson has the record for most consecutive Drivers' Championships, winning five from 2006 to 2010. Thus far, every champion has originated from the United States. Byron has the fewest number of race starts before winning his first title with six in 1949. Bill Rexford is the youngest Cup Series champion; he was 23 years, 7 months, and 15 days old when he won the title in 1950. Bobby Allison is the oldest Cup Series champion; he was 45 years, 11 months, and 17 days old when he won the championship in 1983.

== By season ==
Points format history: List of NASCAR points scoring systems, NASCAR playoffs

Year	Driver	Owner(s)/Teams	No.(s)	Man.(s)	St	P	Ws	TT	Pts	Gap	Ref(s)
Full season points format
1949	Red Byron	Raymond Parks	22	Oldsmobile	6	1	2	4	842.5	117.5	
1950	Bill Rexford	Julian Buesink	8; 20; 59; 60; 62; 80	Oldsmobile	17	0	1	11	1,959	110.5	
1951	Herb Thomas (1)	Herb Thomas (1)	92	Plymouth; Hudson; Oldsmobile	34	4	7	18	4,208.45	146.2	
1951	Herb Thomas (1)	Marshall Teague	6	Plymouth; Hudson; Oldsmobile	34	4	7	18	4,208.45	146.2	
1951	Herb Thomas (1)	Leonard Tippett	99	Plymouth; Hudson; Oldsmobile	34	4	7	18	4,208.45	146.2	
1951	Herb Thomas (1)	Hubert Westmoreland (1)	2	Plymouth; Hudson; Oldsmobile	34	4	7	18	4,208.45	146.2	
1952	Tim Flock (1)	Ted Chester	91	Hudson	33	4	8	25	6,858.5	106	
1953	Herb Thomas (2)	Herb Thomas (2)	92	Hudson (3)	37	12	12	31	8,460	646	
1954	Lee Petty (1)	Petty Enterprises (1)	42	Chrysler; Dodge	34	3	7	32	8,649	283	
1954	Lee Petty (1)	Gary Drake	100	Oldsmobile	34	3	7	32	8,649	283	
1955	Tim Flock (2)	Carl Kiekhaefer (1)	300; 301	Chrysler	39	18	18	33	9,596	1,508	
1955	Tim Flock (2)	Hubert Westmoreland (2)	2	Chevrolet	39	18	18	33	9,596	1,508	
1956	Buck Baker (1)	Carl Kiekhaefer (2)	00; 87; 300; 300C; 301; 500B; 502	Chrysler; Dodge	48	12	14	39	9,272	704	
1956	Buck Baker (1)	James Satcher	87	Ford	48	12	14	39	9,272	704	
1956	Buck Baker (1)	John Whitford	31	Ford	48	12	14	39	9,272	704	
1957	Buck Baker (2)	Buck Baker	87	Chevrolet	40	6	10	38	10,716	760	
1957	Buck Baker (2)	Hugh Babb	87	Chevrolet	40	6	10	38	10,716	760	
1958	Lee Petty (2)	Petty Enterprises (2)	42	Oldsmobile	50	4	7	43	12,232	644	
1959	Lee Petty (3)	Petty Enterprises (3)	42; 43	Oldsmobile; Plymouth	42	2	11	35	11,792	1,830	
1960	Rex White	Rex White	4	Chevrolet	40	3	6	35	21,164	3,936	
1960	Rex White	L.D. Austin	74	Chevrolet	40	3	6	35	21,164	3,936	
1960	Rex White	Beau Morgan	15	Ford	40	3	6	35	21,164	3,936	
1960	Rex White	Scotty Cain	41	Ford	40	3	6	35	21,164	3,936	
1961	Ned Jarrett (1)	Ned Jarrett	11	Ford; Chevrolet	46	4	1	34	27,272	830	
1961	Ned Jarrett (1)	B.G. Holloway	11	Ford; Chevrolet	46	4	1	34	27,272	830	
1962	Joe Weatherly (1)	Bud Moore (1)	8	Pontiac	52	7	9	45	30,836	2,396	
1962	Joe Weatherly (1)	Fred Harb	17	Ford	52	7	9	45	30,836	2,396	
1963	Joe Weatherly (2)	Bud Moore (2)	8	Mercury; Pontiac	53	6	3	35	33,398	2,228	
1963	Joe Weatherly (2)	Floyd Powell	17	Pontiac	53	6	3	35	33,398	2,228	
1963	Joe Weatherly (2)	Pete Stewart	57	Pontiac	53	6	3	35	33,398	2,228	
1963	Joe Weatherly (2)	Cliff Stewart	2	Pontiac	53	6	3	35	33,398	2,228	
1963	Joe Weatherly (2)	Possum Jones	05	Pontiac	53	6	3	35	33,398	2,228	
1963	Joe Weatherly (2)	Worth McMillion	83	Pontiac	53	6	3	35	33,398	2,228	
1963	Joe Weatherly (2)	Major Melton	88	Chrysler (4)	53	6	3	35	33,398	2,228	
1963	Joe Weatherly (2)	Petty Enterprises (4)	41	Plymouth	53	6	3	35	33,398	2,228	
1963	Joe Weatherly (2)	Wade Younts	36; 361	Dodge	53	6	3	35	33,398	2,228	
1964	Richard Petty (1)	Petty Enterprises (5)	41; 42; 43	Plymouth	61	8	9	43	40,252	5,302	
1965	Ned Jarrett (2)	Bondy Long	11	Ford	54	9	13	45	38,824	3,034	
1965	Ned Jarrett (2)	Jabe Thomas	25	Ford	54	9	13	45	38,824	3,034	
1966	David Pearson (1)	Cotton Owens	6	Dodge	42	7	15	33	35,638	1,950	
1967	Richard Petty (2)	Petty Enterprises (6)	43	Plymouth	48	18	27	40	42,472	6,028	
1968	David Pearson (2)	Holman-Moody (1)	17	Ford	48	12	16	38	3,499	126	
1968	David Pearson (2)	Roy Trantham	84	Ford	48	12	16	38	3,499	126	
1969	David Pearson (3)	Holman-Moody (2)	17	Ford	51	13	11	44	4,170	357	
1970	Bobby Isaac	Nord Krauskopf	71	Dodge	47	13	11	38	3,911	51	
1971	Richard Petty (3)	Petty Enterprises (7)	43	Plymouth	46	9	21	41	4,435	364	
1972	Richard Petty (4)	Petty Enterprises (8)	43	Dodge; Plymouth (7)	31	3	8	28	8,701.4	127.9	
1973	Benny Parsons	L.G. DeWitt	72	Chevrolet; Mercury (2)	28	0	1	21	7,173.8	67.15	
1974	Richard Petty (5)	Petty Enterprises (9)	43	Dodge	30	7	10	23	5,037.75	567.45	
1975	Richard Petty (6)	Petty Enterprises (10)	43	Dodge	30	3	13	24	4,783	722	
1976	Cale Yarborough (1)	Junior Johnson (Junior Johnson & Associates) (1)	11	Chevrolet	30	2	9	23	4,644	195	
1977	Cale Yarborough (2)	Junior Johnson (Junior Johnson & Associates) (2)	11	Chevrolet	30	3	9	27	5,000	386	
1978	Cale Yarborough (3)	Junior Johnson (Junior Johnson & Associates) (3)	11	Oldsmobile	30	8	10	24	4,841	474	
1979	Richard Petty (7)	Petty Enterprises (11)	43	Chevrolet; Oldsmobile	31	1	5	27	4,830	11	
1980	Dale Earnhardt (1)	Rod Osterlund (Osterlund Racing)	2	Chevrolet; Oldsmobile (9)	31	0	5	24	4,661	19	
1981	Darrell Waltrip (1)	Junior Johnson (Junior Johnson & Associates) (4)	11	Chevrolet; Buick	31	11	12	25	4,880	53	
1982	Darrell Waltrip (2)	Junior Johnson (Junior Johnson & Associates) (5)	11	Buick	30	7	12	20	4,489	72	
1983	Bobby Allison	Bill Gardner (DiGard Motorsports)	22	Chevrolet; Buick (3)	30	0	6	25	4,667	47	
1984	Terry Labonte (1)	Billy Hagan (Hagan Racing)	44	Chevrolet	30	2	2	24	4,508	65	
1985	Darrell Waltrip (3)	Junior Johnson (Junior Johnson & Associates) (6)	11	Chevrolet	28	4	3	21	4,292	101	
1986	Dale Earnhardt (2)	Richard Childress (Richard Childress Racing) (1)	3	Chevrolet	29	1	5	23	4,468	288	
1987	Dale Earnhardt (3)	Richard Childress (Richard Childress Racing) (2)	3	Chevrolet	29	1	11	24	4,696	489	
1988	Bill Elliott	Harry Melling (Melling Racing)	9	Ford	29	6	6	22	4,488	24	
1989	Rusty Wallace	Raymond Beadle (Blue Max Racing)	27	Pontiac	29	4	6	20	4,176	12	
1990	Dale Earnhardt (4)	Richard Childress (Richard Childress Racing) (3)	3	Chevrolet	29	4	9	23	4,430	26	
1991	Dale Earnhardt (5)	Richard Childress (Richard Childress Racing) (4)	3	Chevrolet	29	0	4	21	4,287	195	
1992	Alan Kulwicki	Alan Kulwicki (AK Racing)	7	Ford	29	6	2	17	4,078	10	
1993	Dale Earnhardt (6)	Richard Childress (Richard Childress Racing) (5)	3	Chevrolet	30	2	6	21	4,526	80	
1994	Dale Earnhardt (7)	Richard Childress (Richard Childress Racing) (6)	3	Chevrolet	31	2	4	25	4,694	444	
1995	Jeff Gordon (1)	Rick Hendrick (Hendrick Motorsports) (1)	24	Chevrolet	31	8	7	23	4,614	34	
1996	Terry Labonte (2)	Rick Hendrick (Hendrick Motorsports) (2)	5	Chevrolet	31	4	2	24	4,657	37	
1997	Jeff Gordon (2)	Rick Hendrick (Hendrick Motorsports) (3)	24	Chevrolet	32	1	10	23	4,710	14	
1998	Jeff Gordon (3)	Rick Hendrick (Hendrick Motorsports) (4)	24	Chevrolet	33	7	13	28	5,328	364	
1999	Dale Jarrett	Robert Yates (Robert Yates Racing)	88	Ford	34	0	4	29	5,262	201	
2000	Bobby Labonte	Joe Gibbs (Joe Gibbs Racing) (1)	18	Pontiac	34	2	4	24	5,130	265	
2001	Jeff Gordon (4)	Rick Hendrick (Hendrick Motorsports) (5)	24	Chevrolet	36	6	6	24	5,112	349	
2002	Tony Stewart (1)	Joe Gibbs (Joe Gibbs Racing) (2)	20	Pontiac (9)	36	2	3	21	4,800	38	
2003	Matt Kenseth	Jack Roush (Roush Racing) (1)	17	Ford	36	0	1	25	5,022	90	
Chase format
2004	Kurt Busch	Jack Roush (Roush Racing) (2)	97	Ford	36	1	3	21	6,506	8	
2005	Tony Stewart (2)	Joe Gibbs (Joe Gibbs Racing) (3)	20	Chevrolet	36	3	5	25	6,533	35	
2006	Jimmie Johnson (1)	Rick Hendrick (Hendrick Motorsports) (6)	48	Chevrolet	36	1	5	24	6,475	56	
2007	Jimmie Johnson (2)	Jeff Gordon (2) Rick Hendrick (Hendrick Motorsports) (7)	48	Chevrolet	36	4	10	24	6,723	77	
2008	Jimmie Johnson (3)	Jeff Gordon (3) Rick Hendrick (Hendrick Motorsports) (8)	48	Chevrolet	36	6	7	22	6,684	69	
2009	Jimmie Johnson (4)	Jeff Gordon (4) Rick Hendrick (Hendrick Motorsports) (9)	48	Chevrolet	36	4	7	24	6,652	141	
2010	Jimmie Johnson (5)	Jeff Gordon (5) Rick Hendrick (Hendrick Motorsports) (10)	48	Chevrolet	36	2	6	23	6,622	39	
2011	Tony Stewart (3)	Tony Stewart, Gene Haas (Stewart–Haas Racing) (1)	14	Chevrolet	36	1	5	19	2,403	0 (Note: Stewart won the 2011 championship on tie-breaker against Carl Edwards; Stewart had five wins against Edwards' one.)	
2012	Brad Keselowski	Roger Penske (Penske Racing) (1)	2	Dodge (18)	36	0	5	23	2,400	39	
2013	Jimmie Johnson (6)	Jeff Gordon (6) Rick Hendrick (Hendrick Motorsports) (11)	48	Chevrolet	36	4	6	24	2,419	19	
Playoff Format
2014	Kevin Harvick	Tony Stewart, Gene Haas (Stewart–Haas Racing) (2)	4	Chevrolet	36	8	5	20	5,043	1	
2015	Kyle Busch (1)	Joe Gibbs (Joe Gibbs Racing) (4)	18	Toyota	25 (Note: Kyle Busch missed 11 races after suffering an injury during that year's Daytona 500 companion Xfinity Series race, 2015 Alert Today Florida 300, but was granted a waiver by NASCAR that allowed him to compete for the Chase.)	1	5	16	5,043	1	
2016	Jimmie Johnson (7)	Jeff Gordon (7) Rick Hendrick (Hendrick Motorsports) (12)	48	Chevrolet	36	1	5	16	5,040	3	
2017	Martin Truex Jr.	Barney Visser (Furniture Row Racing)	78	Toyota	36	3	8	26	5,040	5	
2018	Joey Logano (1)	Roger Penske (Team Penske) (2)	22	Ford	36	3	3	26	5,040	5	
2019	Kyle Busch (2)	Joe Gibbs (Joe Gibbs Racing) (5)	18	Toyota	36	1	5	27	5,040	5	
2020	Chase Elliott	Rick Hendrick (Hendrick Motorsports) (13)	9	Chevrolet	36	1	5	22	5,040	5	
2021	Kyle Larson (1)	Rick Hendrick (Hendrick Motorsports) (14)	5	Chevrolet (41)	36	2	10	26	5,040	5	
2022	Joey Logano (2)	Roger Penske (Team Penske) (3)	22	Ford	36	4	4	15	5,040	6	
2023	Ryan Blaney	Roger Penske (Team Penske) (4)	12	Ford	36	0	3	18	5,035	1	
2024	Joey Logano (3)	Roger Penske (Team Penske) (5)	22	Ford (15)	36	3	4	12	5,040	5	
2025	Kyle Larson (2)	Rick Hendrick (Hendrick Motorsports) (15)	5	Chevrolet (42)	36	1	3	22	5,034	3	
Chase format
2026	Kyle Larson (3)	Rick Hendrick (Hendrick Motorsports) (16)	5	Chevrolet (43)	36	2	3	22	2,501	49	

=== By drivers ===
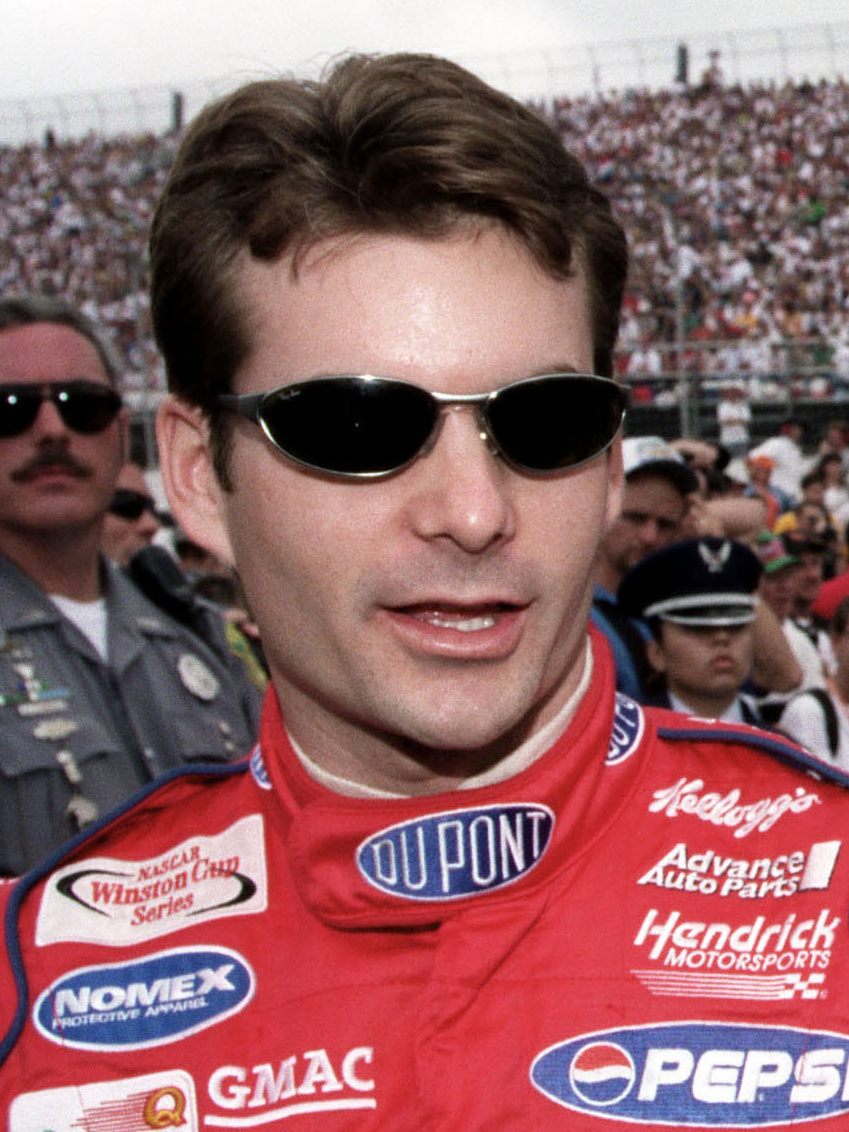
Four-time Champion Jeff Gordon (Pictured at Dover in 2000) is the only other driver with more than three championships.

As of completion of the seventy-eighth season (2026), 36 different drivers have won a NASCAR Cup Series Drivers' Championship – with 18 of these drivers winning more than once.

*	Inducted into the NASCAR Hall of Fame
^	Denotes driver who is still active
†	Not yet eligible for the NASCAR Hall of Fame (Note: A driver is not eligible until he has been retired for three years.)

Driver	Total	Seasons
Richard Petty*	7	1964, 1967, 1971, 1972, 1974, 1975, 1979
Dale Earnhardt*	7	1980, 1986, 1987, 1990, 1991, 1993, 1994
Jimmie Johnson*^	7	2006, 2007, 2008, 2009, 2010, 2013, 2016
Jeff Gordon*	4	1995, 1997, 1998, 2001
Lee Petty*	3	1954, 1958, 1959
David Pearson*	3	1966, 1968, 1969
Cale Yarborough*	3	1976, 1977, 1978
Darrell Waltrip*	3	1981, 1982, 1985
Tony Stewart*	3	2002, 2005, 2011
Joey Logano^	3	2018, 2022, 2024
Kyle Larson^	3	2021, 2025, 2026
Herb Thomas*	2	1951, 1953
Tim Flock*	2	1952, 1955
Buck Baker*	2	1956, 1957
Joe Weatherly*	2	1962, 1963
Ned Jarrett*	2	1961, 1965
Terry Labonte*	2	1984, 1996
Kyle Busch (Note: Kyle Busch died, of medical issues, during the 2026 season; as of this update, the 2026 season is still underway, thus he does yet slot into one of these categories.)	2	2015, 2019
Red Byron*	1	1949
Bill Rexford	1	1950
Rex White*	1	1960
Bobby Isaac*	1	1970
Benny Parsons*	1	1973
Bobby Allison*	1	1983
Bill Elliott*	1	1988
Rusty Wallace*	1	1989
Alan Kulwicki*	1	1992
Dale Jarrett*	1	1999
Bobby Labonte*	1	2000
Matt Kenseth*	1	2003
Kurt Busch*	1	2004
Brad Keselowski^	1	2012
Kevin Harvick*	1	2014
Martin Truex Jr.^	1	2017
Chase Elliott^	1	2020
Ryan Blaney^	1	2023

=== By Origin ===
As of completion of the seventy-eighth season (2026), all Cup series champions have originated from the United States, coming from 17 different states.

State	Total	Seasons
North Carolina	25	1951, 1953, 1954, 1958, 1959, 1960, 1961, 1964, 1965, 1967, 1970, 1971, 1972, 1973, 1974, 1975, 1979, 1980, 1986, 1987, 1990, 1991, 1993, 1994, 1999
California	15	1995, 1997, 1998, 2001, 2006, 2007, 2008, 2009, 2010, 2013, 2014, 2016, 2021, 2025, 2026
South Carolina	8	1956, 1957, 1966, 1968, 1969, 1976, 1977, 1978
Alabama	4	1949, 1952, 1955, 1983
Kentucky	3	1981, 1982, 1985
Texas	3	1984, 1996, 2000
Indiana	3	2002, 2005, 2011
Nevada	3	2004, 2015, 2019
Connecticut	3	2018, 2022, 2024
Virginia	2	1962, 1963
Georgia	2	1988, 2020
Wisconsin	2	1992, 2003
New York	1	1950
Missouri	1	1989
Michigan	1	2012
New Jersey	1	2017
Ohio	1	2023

=== Records ===
==== Consecutive Drivers' Championships ====
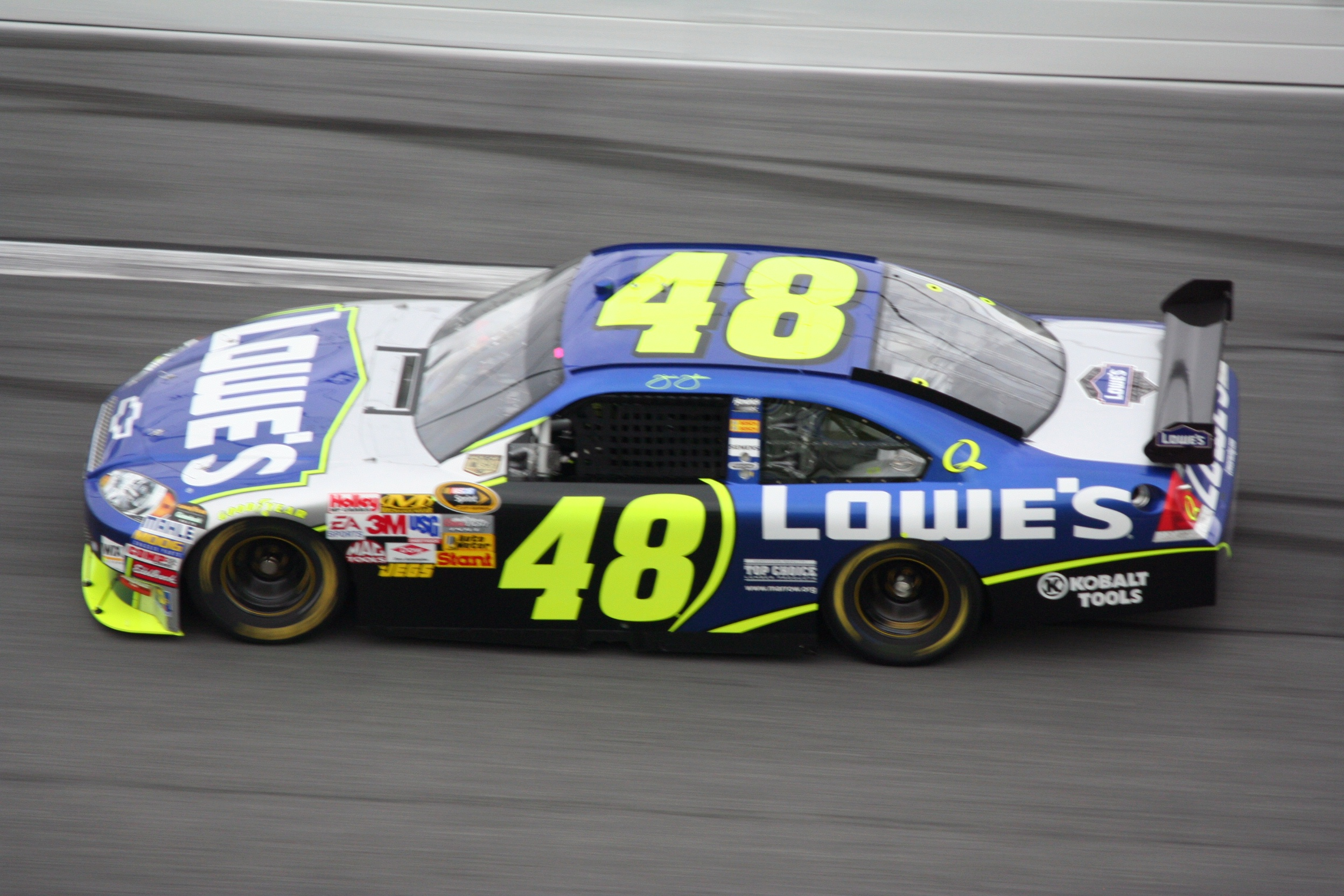
Jimmie Johnson (2008 car shown) won the Drivers' Championship a record five consecutive times from 2006 to 2010.

As of completion of the 2026 season, eleven drivers have achieved consecutive wins in the NASCAR Cup Series Drivers' Championship.

Championships	Driver	Seasons
5	Jimmie Johnson	2006, 2007, 2008, 2009, 2010
3	Cale Yarborough	1976, 1977, 1978
2	Buck Baker	1956, 1957
2	Lee Petty	1958, 1959
2	Joe Weatherly	1962, 1963
2	David Pearson	1968, 1969
2	Richard Petty	1971, 1972, 1974, 1975
2	Darrell Waltrip	1981, 1982
2	Dale Earnhardt	1986, 1987, 1990, 1991, 1993, 1994
2	Jeff Gordon	1997, 1998
2	Kyle Larson	2025, 2026

== Regular season champions ==
From 2017–2025, NASCAR awarded a regular season championship which recognizes the best driver of the regular season. It is awarded to the driver with the most non-playoff points before the beginning of that season's playoff.

Season	Driver	Owner(s)/Teams	No.(s)	Man.(s)
2017	Martin Truex Jr. (1)	Barney Visser (Furniture Row Racing)	78	Toyota
2018	Kyle Busch (1)	Joe Gibbs (Joe Gibbs Racing) (1)	18	Toyota
2019	Kyle Busch (2)	Joe Gibbs (Joe Gibbs Racing) (2)	18	Toyota
2020	Kevin Harvick	Tony Stewart, Gene Haas (Stewart–Haas Racing)	4	Ford
2021	Kyle Larson	Rick Hendrick (Hendrick Motorsports) (1)	5	Chevrolet
2022	Chase Elliott	Rick Hendrick (Hendrick Motorsports) (2)	9	Chevrolet
2023	Martin Truex Jr. (2)	Joe Gibbs (Joe Gibbs Racing) (3)	19	Toyota
2024	Tyler Reddick	Michael Jordan, Denny Hamlin (23XI Racing)	45	Toyota
2025	William Byron	Rick Hendrick (Hendrick Motorsports) (3)	24	Chevrolet

== See also ==
- NASCAR
- NASCAR Cup Series
- List of NASCAR Manufacturers' champions
- List of NASCAR O'Reilly Auto Parts Series champions
- List of NASCAR Truck Series champions
- List of all-time NASCAR Cup Series winners
- List of NASCAR teams
- List of NASCAR tracks
