= List of NASCAR race wins by Kyle Busch =

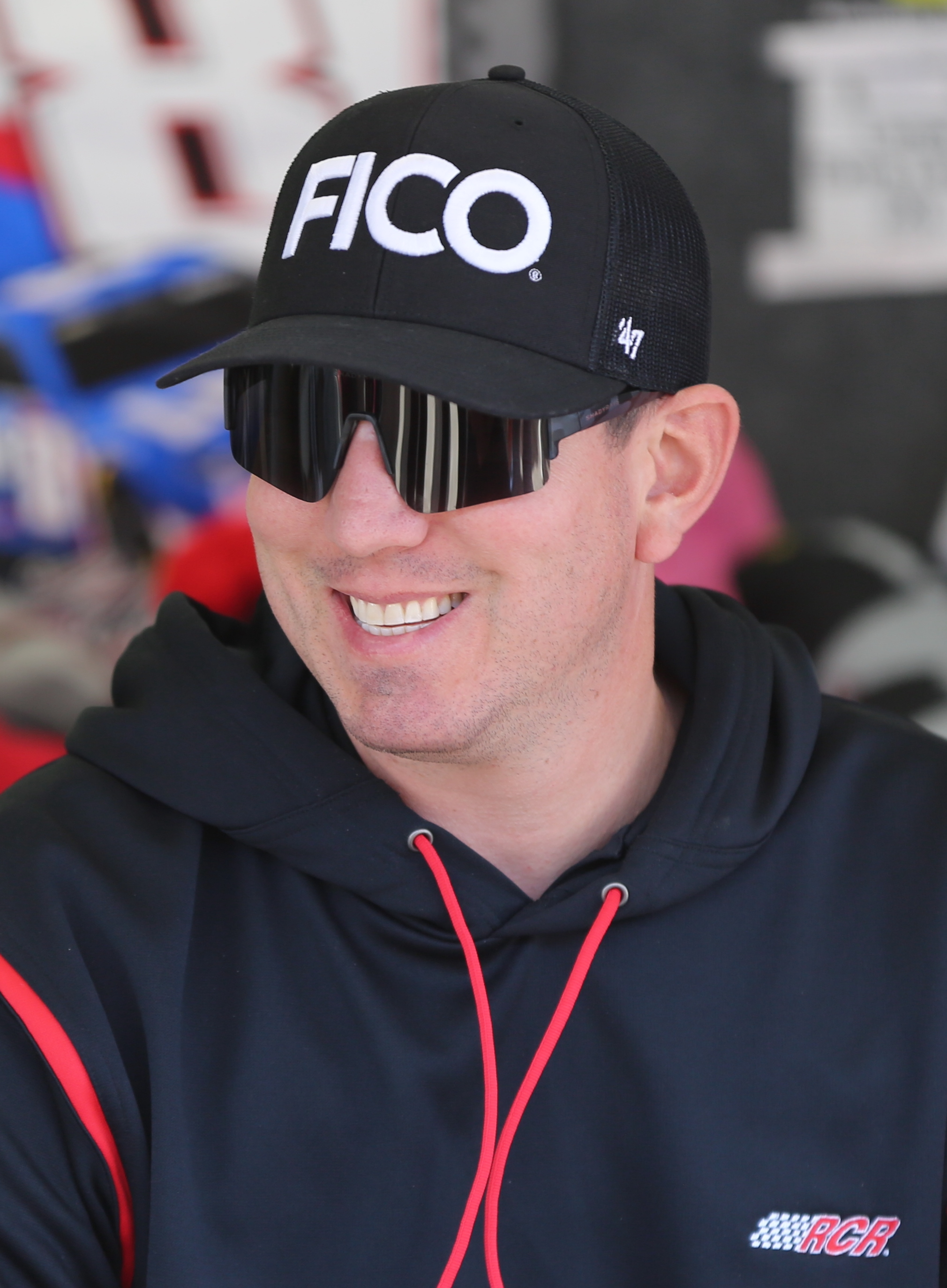
Kyle Busch (pictured in 2024) currently holds the record for the most wins in the NASCAR O'Reilly Auto Parts Series and Craftsman Truck Series.

Kyle Busch was an American racing driver who competed in NASCAR from 2001 until his death in 2026. At the age of 16, he made his NASCAR debut with RFK Racing (then known as Roush Racing) in the 2001 Craftsman Truck Series race at Indianapolis Raceway Park, finishing ninth. He drove in six more races with the team before being let go in February 2003. He was then hired by Hendrick Motorsports (HMS) ahead of the 2003 ARCA Re/Max Series season and won two races. That same year, he debuted in the O'Reilly Auto Parts Series (then the Busch Series) with NEMCO Motorsports, finishing a season-high second place in seven races. In the next year, Busch won five races and was declared the Rookie of the Year in his first full-time season in the Busch Series with HMS.

Busch's success in the lower-tier NASCAR series earned him a part-time seat in the Nextel Cup Series for 2004. His debut in the Cup Series, the UAW-DaimlerChrysler 400 at Las Vegas Motor Speedway, saw him finish 41st after crashing on the 11th lap. He never finished higher than 24th in his next five starts. Despite his struggles, Busch replaced NASCAR veteran Terry Labonte in HMS' No. 5 car in the 2005 season. He earned his first career win that same year in the Sony HD 500 at Auto Club Speedway, becoming the youngest Cup Series winner in history at 20 years, four months, and two days old, (Note: The record is currently held by Joey Logano, who earned his first Cup Series win in 2009 at 19 years, one month, and four days old.) en route to being awarded the Rookie of the Year title. Busch had since moved to Joe Gibbs Racing in 2008 and to Richard Childress Racing in 2023.

Through the course of his racing career, Kyle Busch had won a combined 234 races across NASCAR's top three national series, a record-high as of 2026. In the Cup Series, he earned two championships (2015 and 2019) and 63 race wins, placing him tenth on the wins list. He also holds the record of most consecutive seasons with at least one win at 19 (2005–2023). In addition, he has earned the most wins in the O'Reilly Auto Parts Series (102) and the Craftsman Truck Series (69), along with the 2009 championship in the former series. Busch is the first (and as of 2026, only) NASCAR driver to have won in all three series on the same weekend, doing so in the August weekends at Bristol Motor Speedway in 2010 and 2017. His last win in NASCAR was in the 2026 Ecosave 200, a Truck Series race at Dover Motor Speedway, six days before his death.

== NASCAR ==
=== Cup Series ===
In the NASCAR Cup Series, Busch, the 2005 Rookie of the Year and two-time series champion, earned 63 race wins. As of 2026, he has the tenth-most wins in series history. Of the 32 tracks that he raced on throughout his career, he has won on 25. His win in the 2018 Coca-Cola 600 at Charlotte Motor Speedway made him the first driver in the modern era (1972–present) to win at all active tracks in which the series competed (23 at the time).

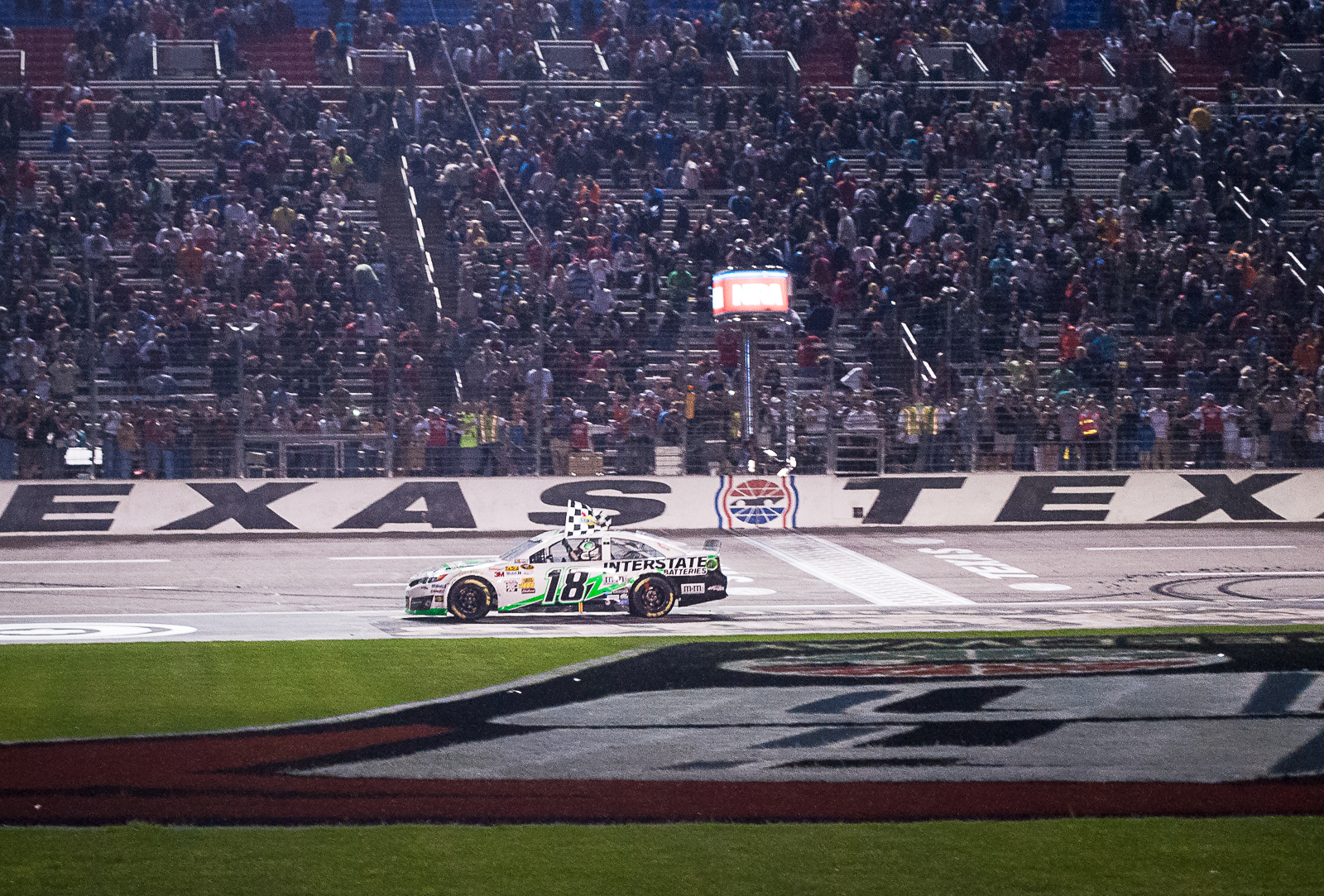
Busch holding the checkered flag at the 2013 NRA 500

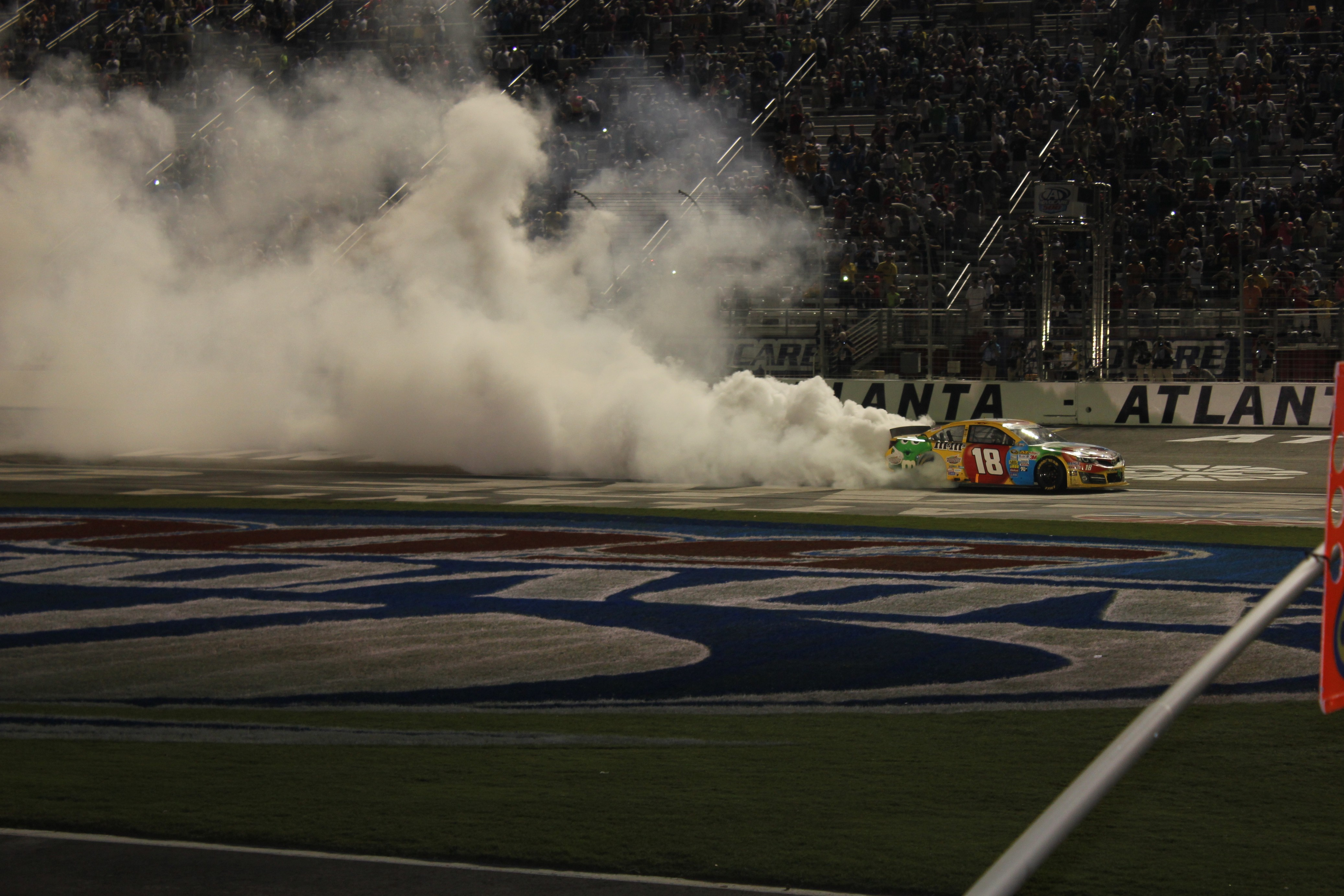
Busch performing a burnout at the 2013 AdvoCare 500

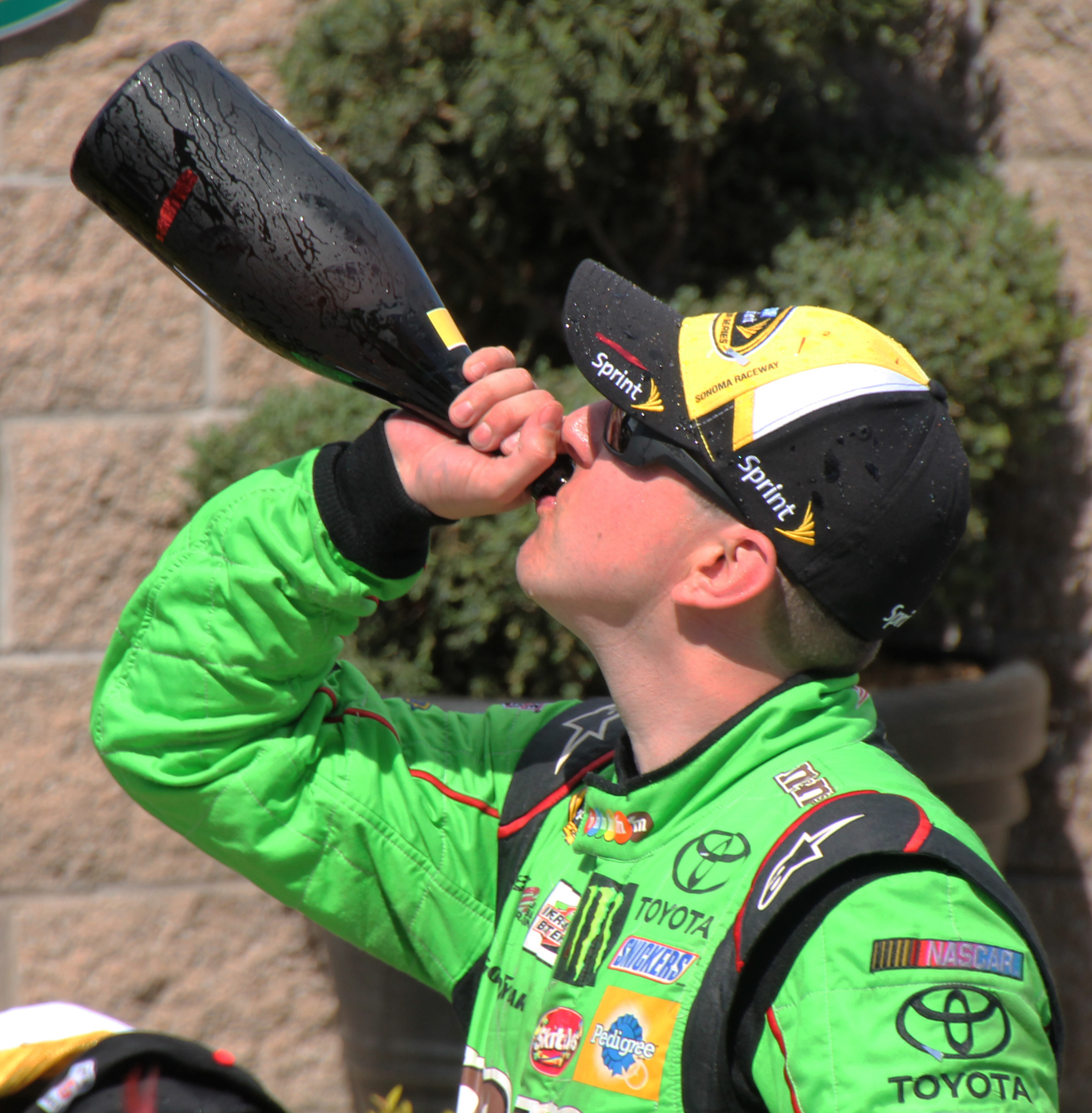
Busch drinking from a wine bottle in victory lane at the 2015 Toyota/Save Mart 350

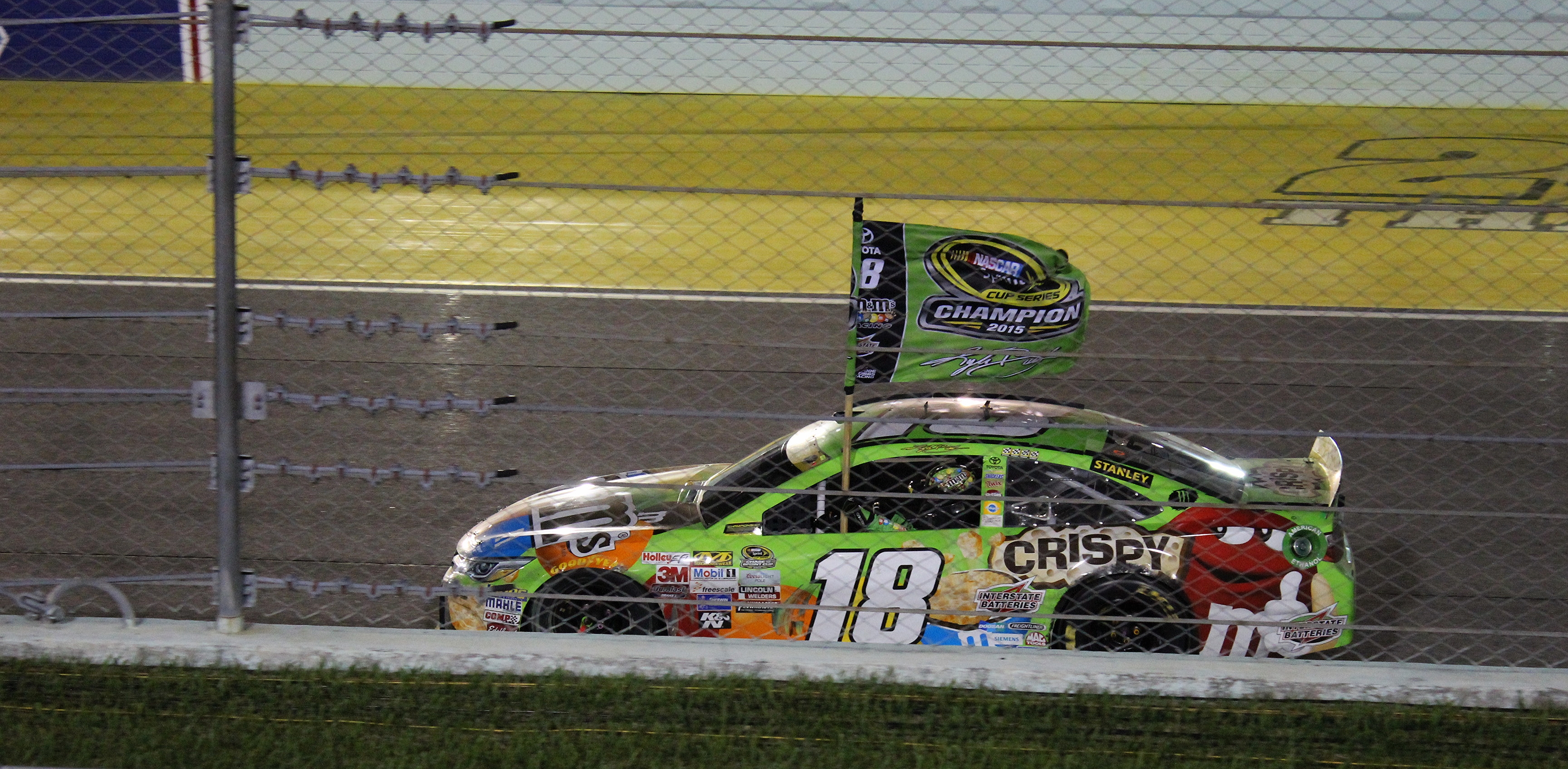
Busch holding the championship flag after clinching his first Cup Series title by winning the 2015 Ford EcoBoost 400

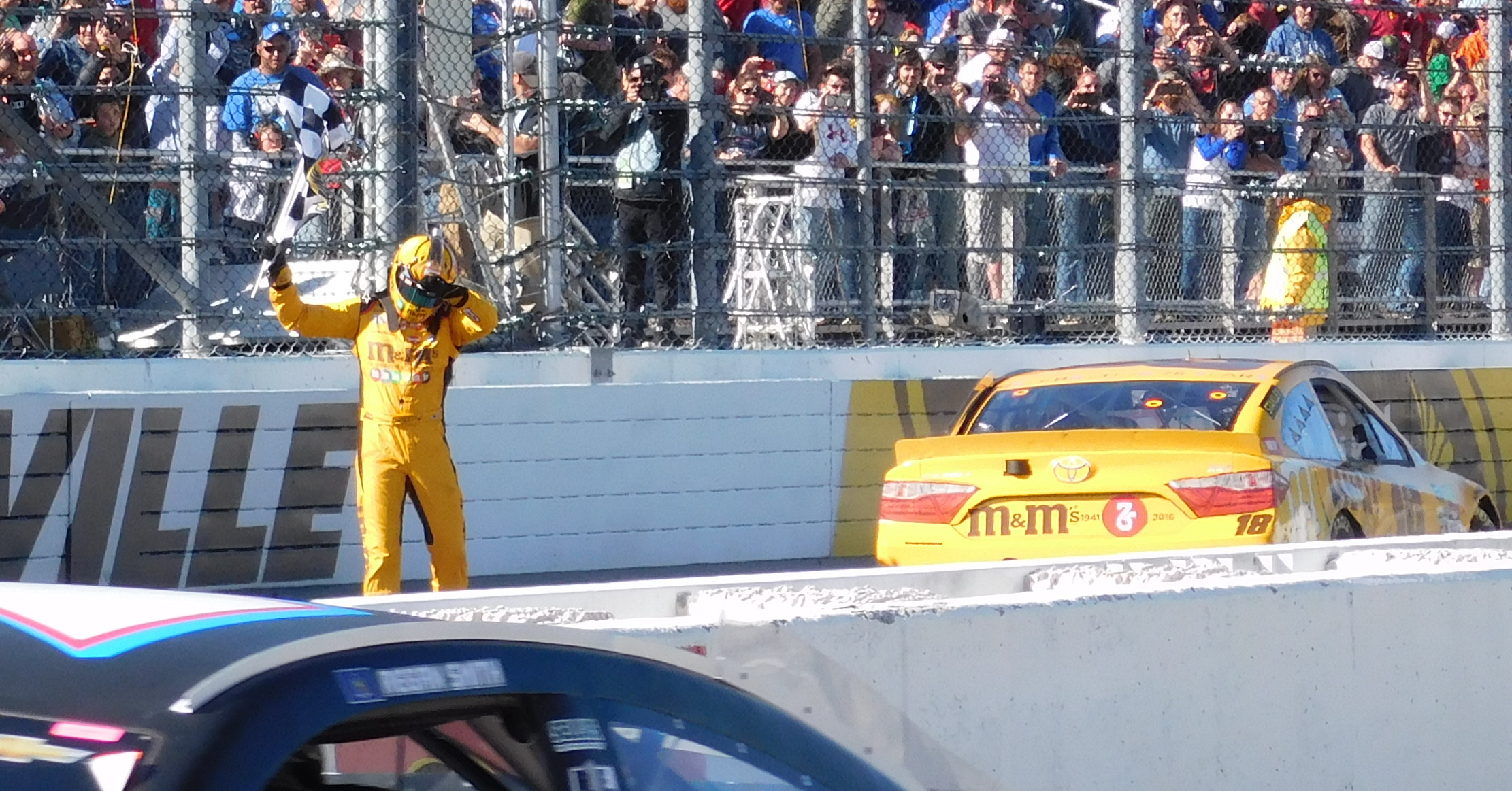
Busch holding the checkered flag at the 2016 STP 500

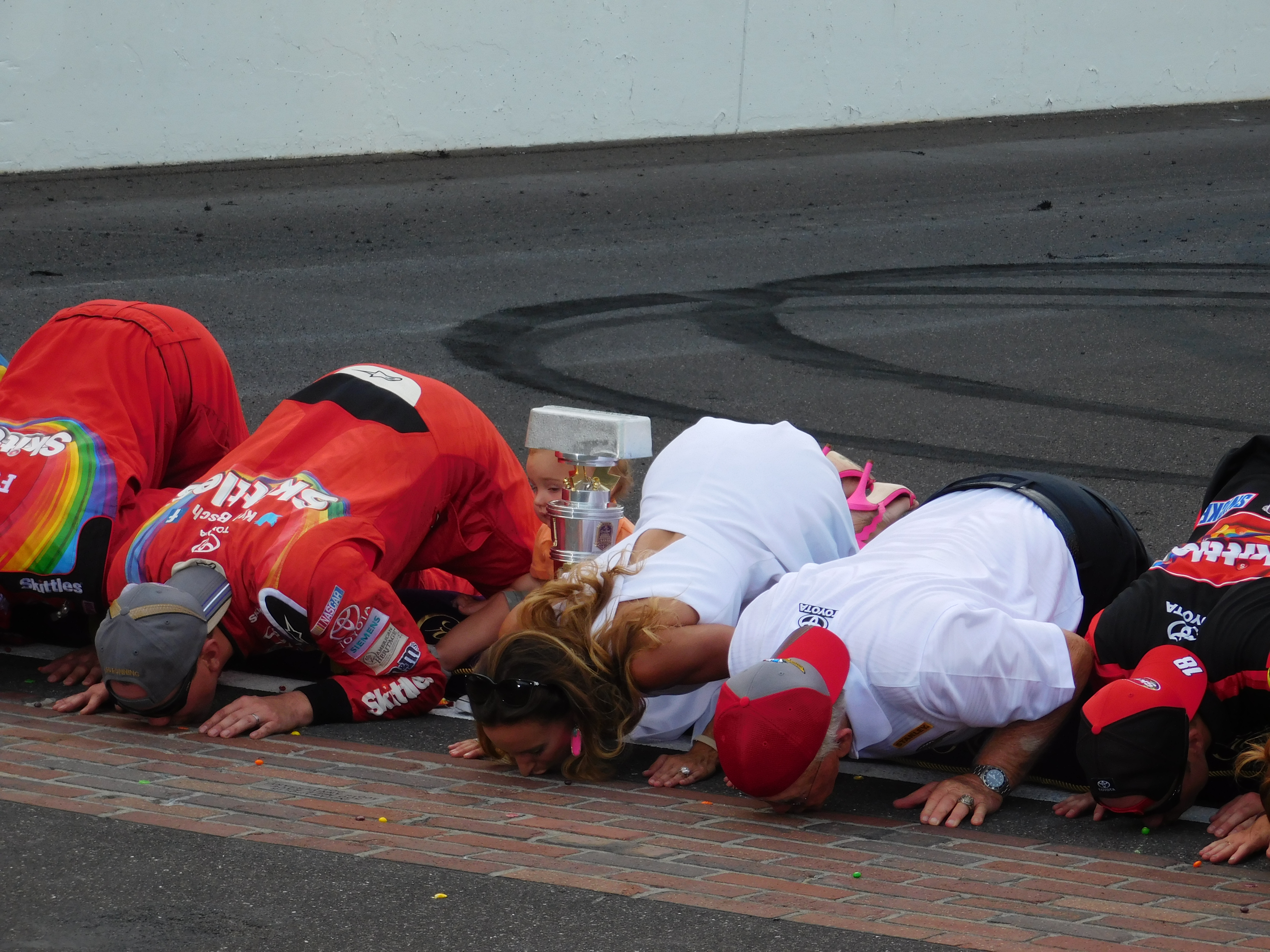
Busch kissing the bricks on the front stretch of the Indianapolis Motor Speedway after winning the 2016 Brickyard 400

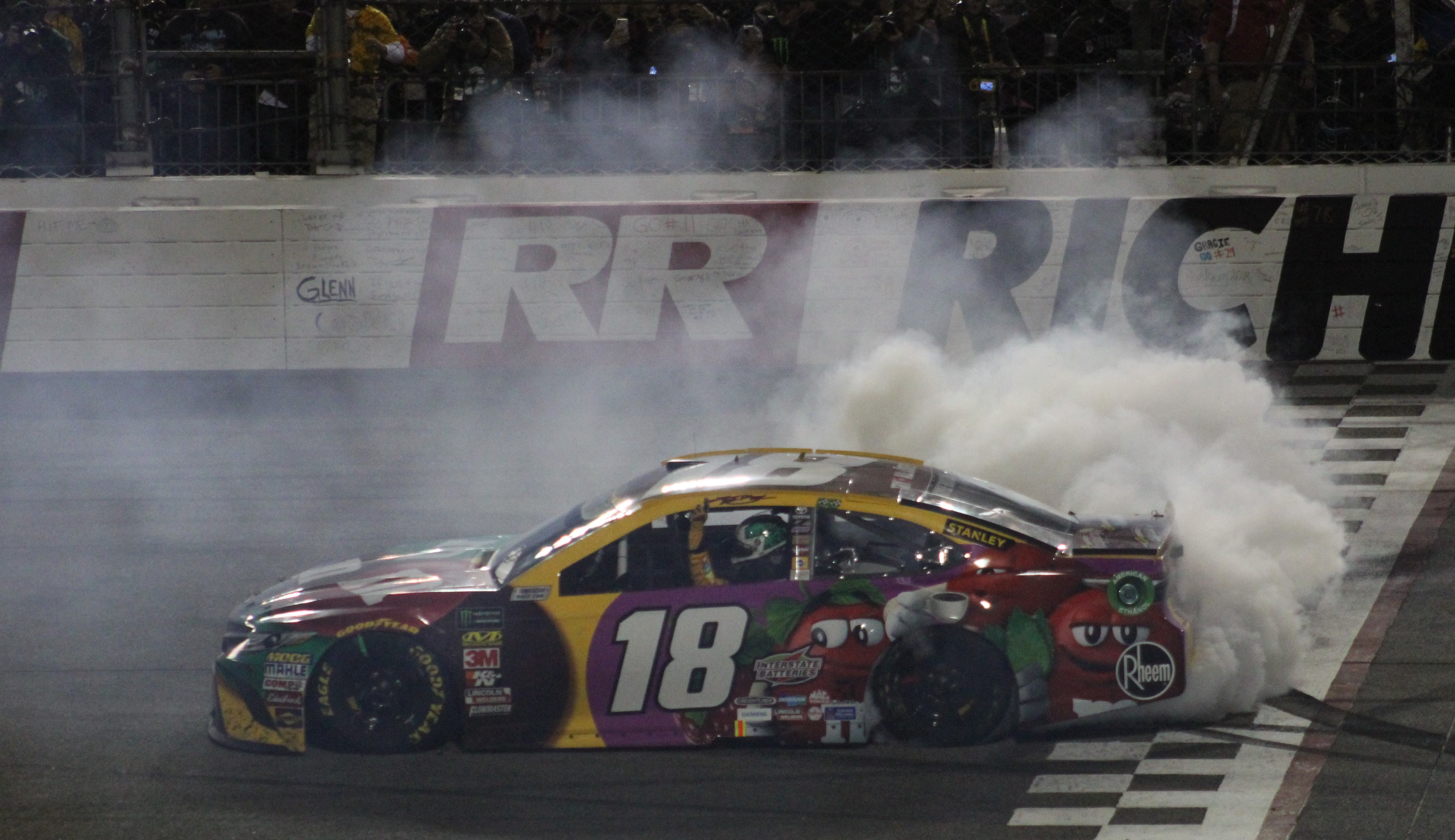
Busch performing a burnout at the 2018 Toyota Owners 400

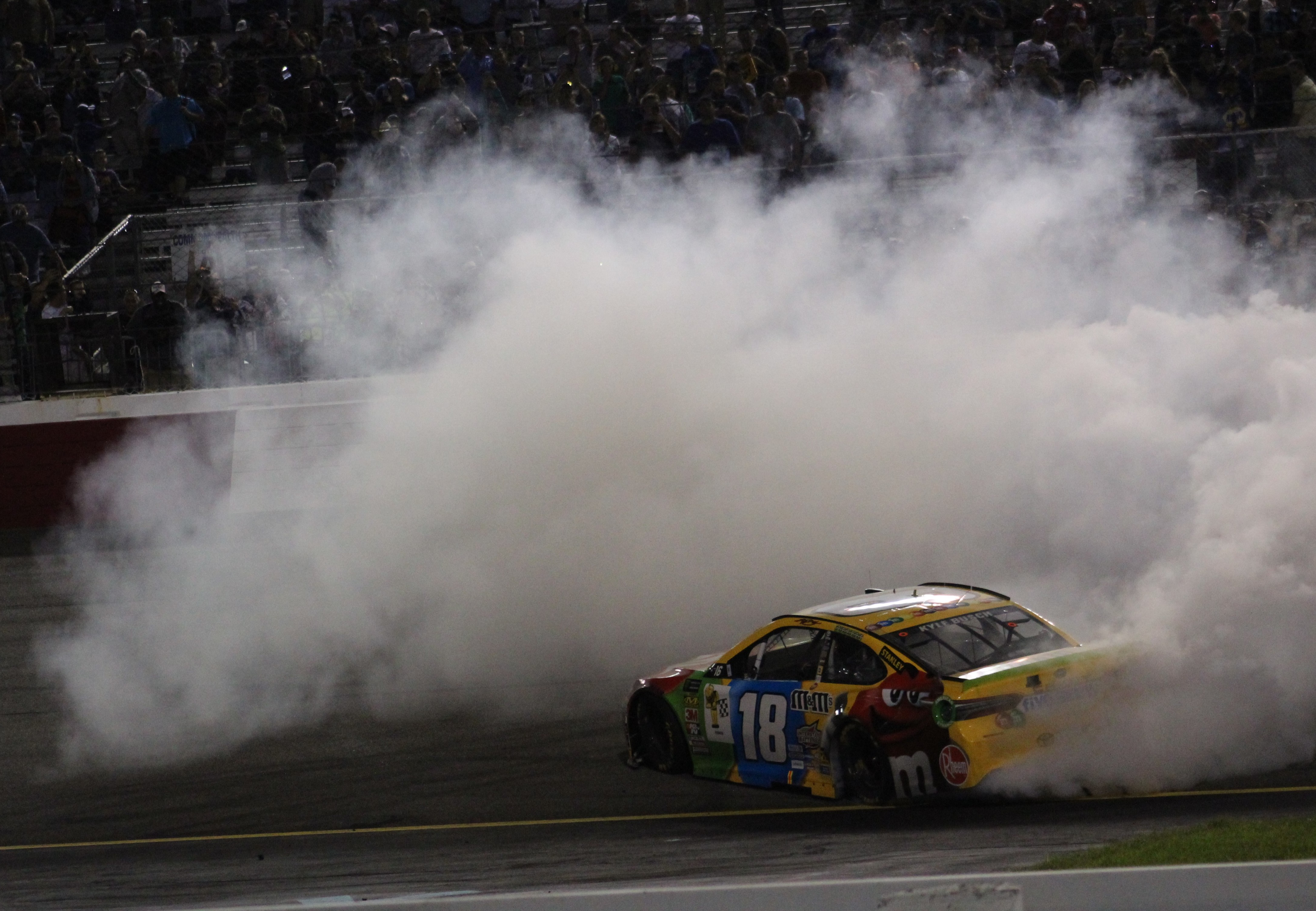
Busch performing a burnout at the 2018 Federated Auto Parts 400

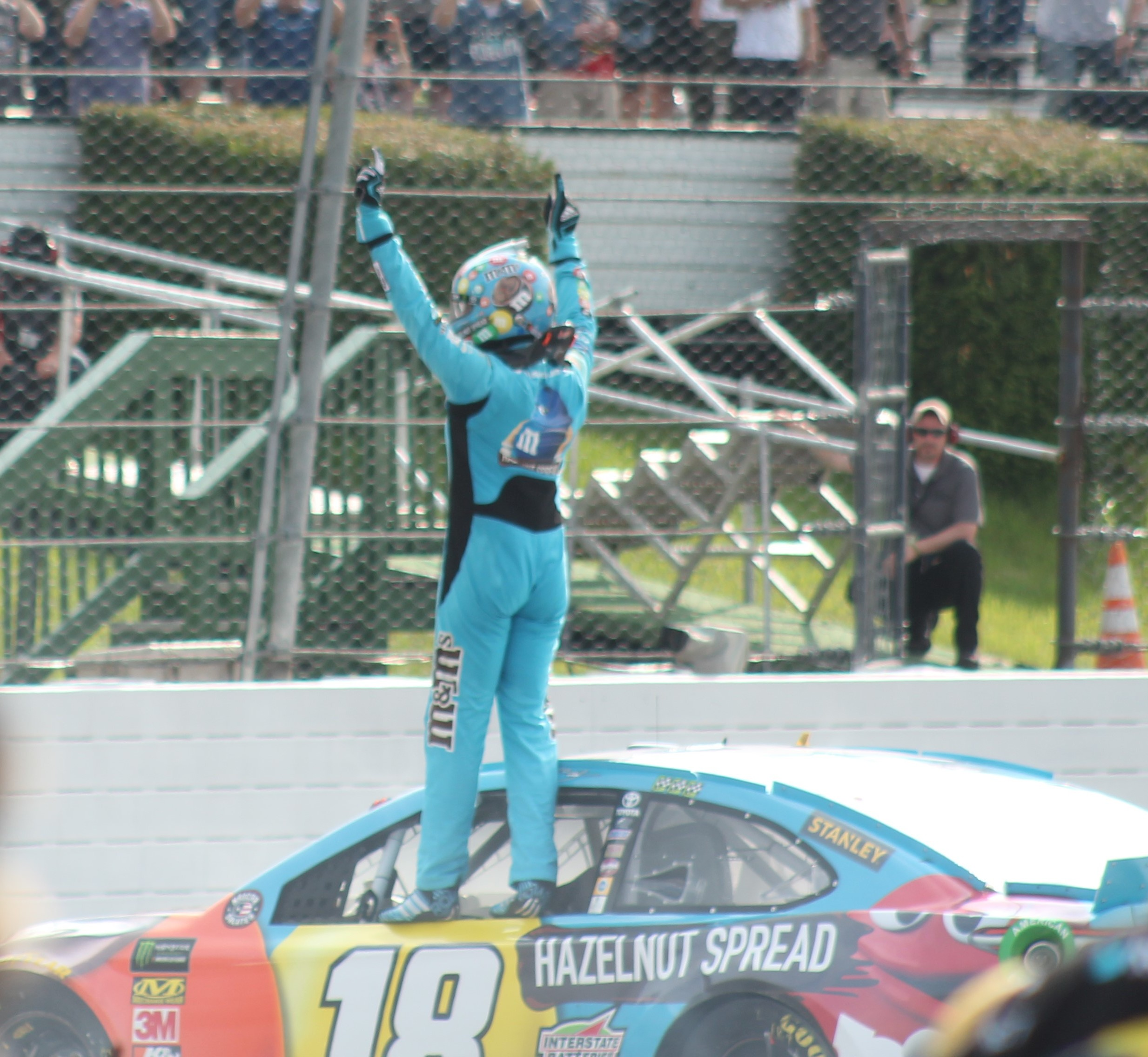
Busch saluting the crowd at the 2019 Pocono 400

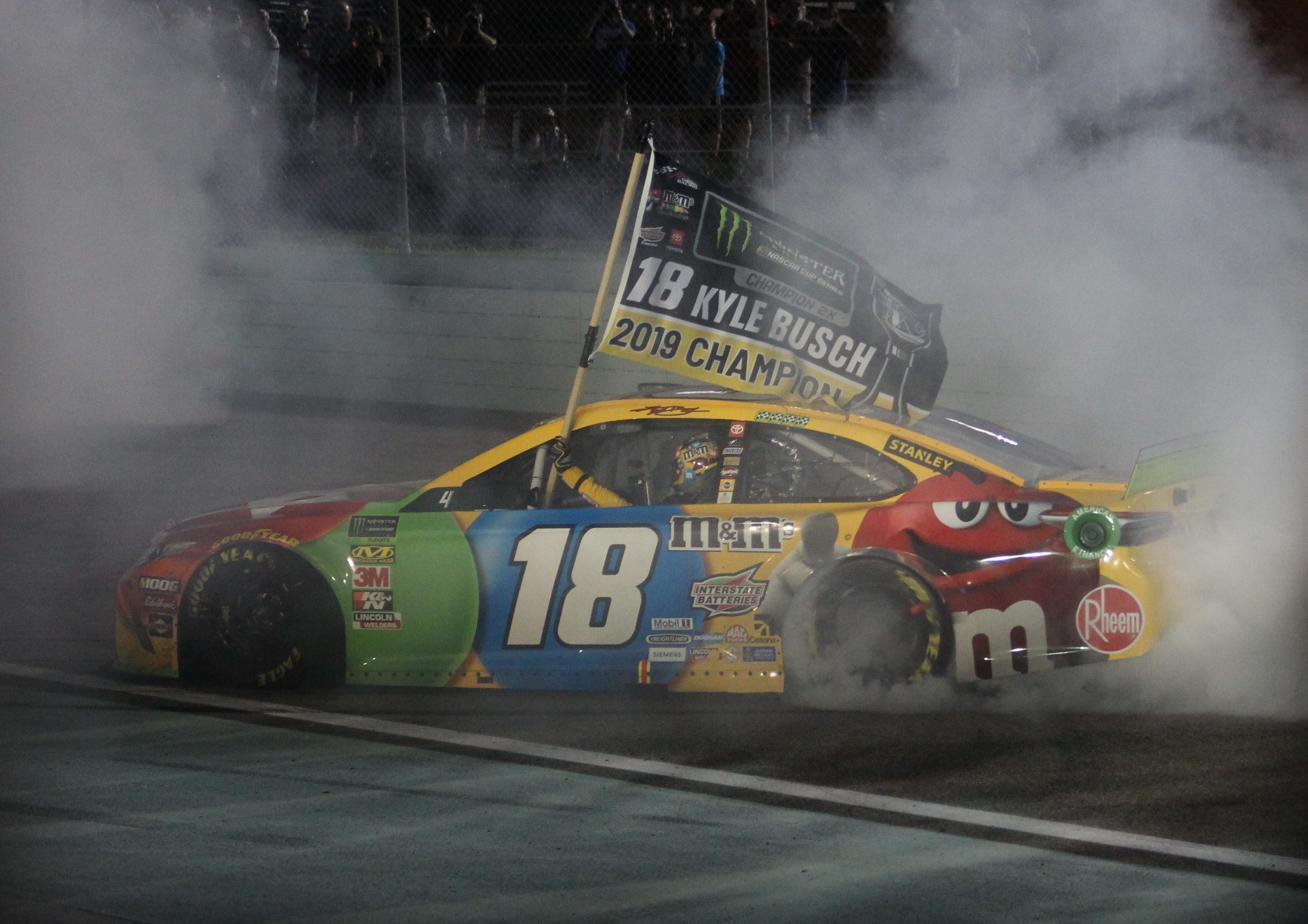
Busch holding the championship flag while performing a burnout after clinching his second Cup Series title by winning the 2019 Ford EcoBoost 400

NASCAR Cup Series victories
No.	Date	Season	Race	Track	Ref.
1	September 4, 2005	2005	Sony HD 500	California Speedway	
2	November 13, 2005	2005	Checker Auto Parts 500	Phoenix International Raceway	
3	July 16, 2006	2006	Lenox Industrial Tools 300	New Hampshire International Speedway	
4	March 25, 2007	2007	Food City 500	Bristol Motor Speedway	
5	March 9, 2008	2008	Kobalt Tools 500	Atlanta Motor Speedway	
6	April 27, 2008	2008	Aaron's 499	Talladega Superspeedway	
7	May 10, 2008	2008	Dodge Challenger 500	Darlington Raceway	
8	June 1, 2008	2008	Best Buy 400	Dover International Speedway	
9	June 22, 2008	2008	Toyota/Save Mart 350	Infineon Raceway	
10	July 5, 2008	2008	Coke Zero 400	Daytona International Speedway	
11	July 12, 2008	2008	LifeLock.com 400	Chicagoland Speedway	
12	August 10, 2008	2008	Centurion Boats at the Glen	Watkins Glen International	
13	March 1, 2009	2009	Shelby 427	Las Vegas Motor Speedway	
14	March 22, 2009	2009	Food City 500	Bristol Motor Speedway	
15	May 2, 2009	2009	Crown Royal Presents the Russ Friedman 400	Richmond International Raceway	
16	August 22, 2009	2009	Sharpie 500	Bristol Motor Speedway	
17	May 1, 2010	2010	Crown Royal Presents the Heath Calhoun 400	Richmond International Raceway	
18	May 16, 2010	2010	Autism Speaks 400	Dover International Speedway	
19	August 21, 2010	2010	Irwin Tools Night Race	Bristol Motor Speedway	
20	March 20, 2011	2011	Jeff Byrd 500	Bristol Motor Speedway	
21	April 30, 2011	2011	Crown Royal Presents the Matthew and Daniel Hansen 400	Richmond International Raceway	
22	July 9, 2011	2011	Quaker State 400	Kentucky Speedway	
23	August 21, 2011	2011	Pure Michigan 400	Michigan International Speedway	
24	April 28, 2012	2012	Capital City 400	Richmond International Raceway	
25	March 24, 2013	2013	Auto Club 400	Auto Club Speedway	
26	April 13, 2013	2013	NRA 500	Texas Motor Speedway	
27	August 11, 2013	2013	Cheez-It 355 at The Glen	Watkins Glen International	
28	September 1, 2013	2013	AdvoCare 500	Atlanta Motor Speedway	
29	March 23, 2014	2014	Auto Club 400	Auto Club Speedway	
30	June 28, 2015	2015	Toyota/Save Mart 350	Sonoma Raceway	
31	July 11, 2015	2015	Quaker State 400	Kentucky Speedway	
32	July 19, 2015	2015	5-hour Energy 301	New Hampshire Motor Speedway	
33	July 26, 2015	2015	Crown Royal Presents the Jeff Kyle 400 at the Brickyard	Indianapolis Motor Speedway	
34	November 22, 2015	2015	Ford EcoBoost 400	Homestead–Miami Speedway	
35	April 3, 2016	2016	STP 500	Martinsville Speedway	
36	April 9, 2016	2016	Duck Commander 500	Texas Motor Speedway	
37	May 7, 2016	2016	GoBowling.com 400	Kansas Speedway	
38	July 24, 2016	2016	Crown Royal presents the Combat Wounded Coalition 400 at the Brickyard	Indianapolis Motor Speedway	
39	July 30, 2017	2017	Overton's 400	Pocono Raceway	
40	August 19, 2017	2017	Bass Pro Shops NRA Night Race	Bristol Motor Speedway	
41	September 24, 2017	2017	ISM Connect 300	New Hampshire Motor Speedway	
42	October 1, 2017	2017	Apache Warrior 400	Dover International Speedway	
43	October 29, 2017	2017	First Data 500	Martinsville Speedway	
44	April 8, 2018	2018	O'Reilly Auto Parts 500	Texas Motor Speedway	
45	April 16, 2018	2018	Food City 500	Bristol Motor Speedway	
46	April 21, 2018	2018	Toyota Owners 400	Richmond Raceway	
47	May 27, 2018	2018	Coca-Cola 600	Charlotte Motor Speedway	
48	July 1, 2018	2018	Overton's 400	Chicagoland Speedway	
49	July 29, 2018	2018	Gander Outdoors 400	Pocono Raceway	
50	September 22, 2018	2018	Federated Auto Parts 400	Richmond Raceway	
51	November 11, 2018	2018	Can-Am 500	ISM Raceway	
52	March 10, 2019	2019	TicketGuardian 500	ISM Raceway	
53	March 17, 2019	2019	Auto Club 400	Auto Club Speedway	
54	April 7, 2019	2019	Food City 500	Bristol Motor Speedway	
55	June 2, 2019	2019	Pocono 400	Pocono Raceway	
56	November 17, 2019	2019	Ford EcoBoost 400	Homestead–Miami Speedway	
57	October 28, 2020	2020	Autotrader EchoPark Automotive 500	Texas Motor Speedway	
58	May 2, 2021	2021	Buschy McBusch Race 400	Kansas Speedway	
59	June 27, 2021	2021	Explore the Pocono Mountains 350	Pocono Raceway	
60	April 17, 2022	2022	Food City Dirt Race	Bristol Motor Speedway	
61	February 26, 2023	2023	Pala Casino 400	Auto Club Speedway	
62	April 23, 2023	2023	GEICO 500	Talladega Superspeedway	
63	June 4, 2023	2023	Enjoy Illinois 300	World Wide Technology Raceway	

=== O'Reilly Auto Parts Series ===
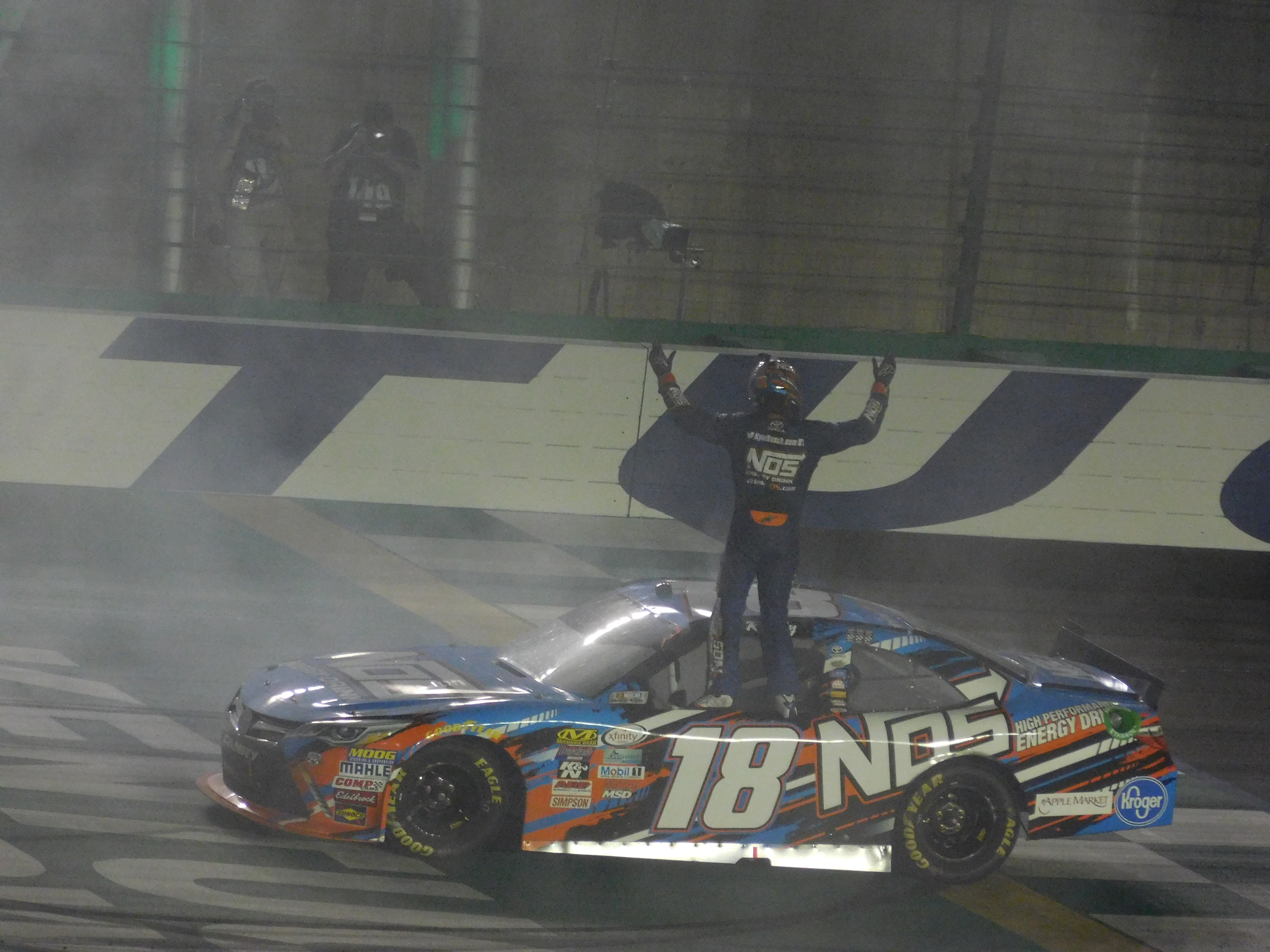
Busch saluting the crowd at the 2016 Alsco 300

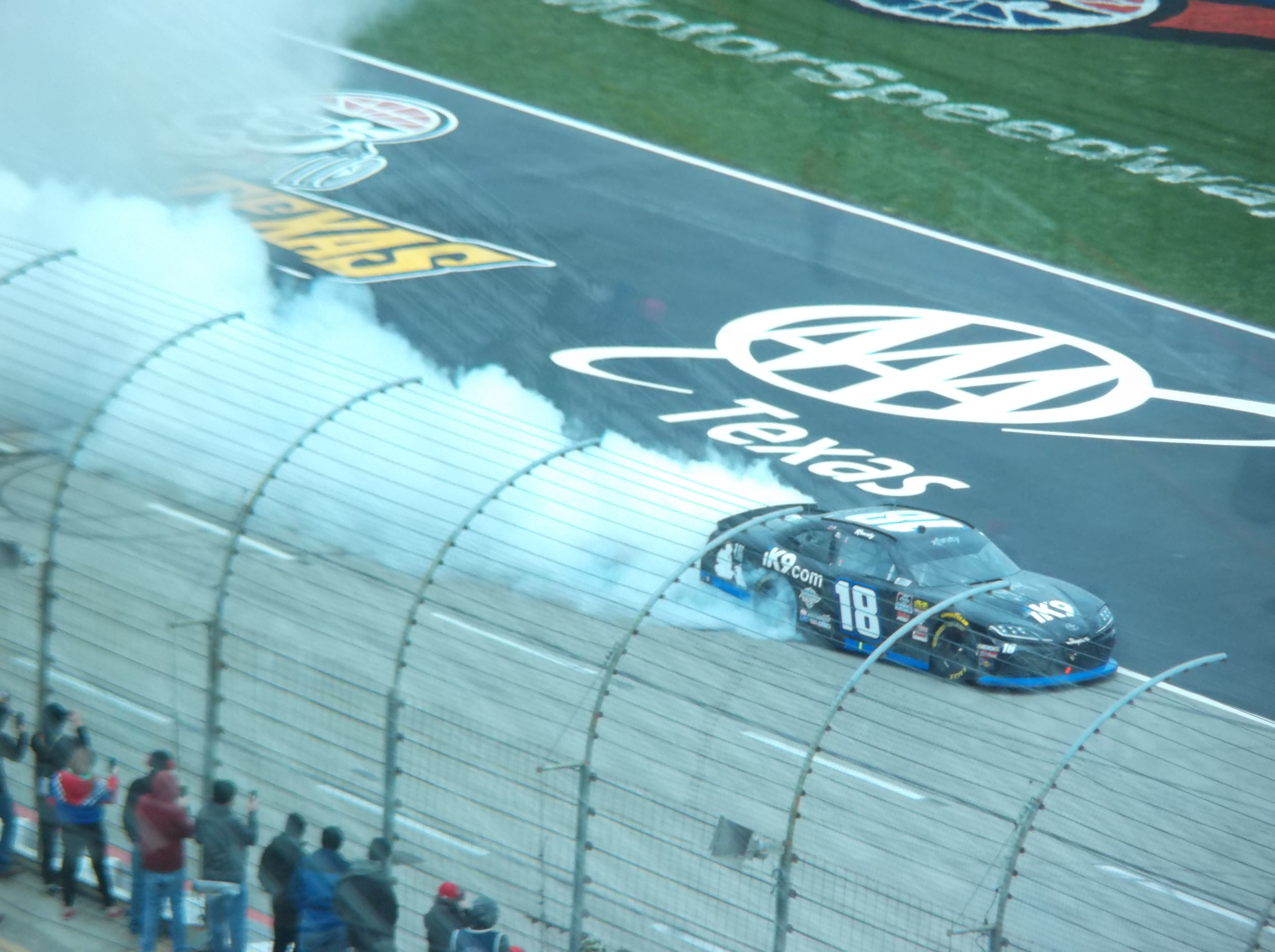
Busch performing a burnout at the 2019 My Bariatric Solutions 300

In the second-tier NASCAR O'Reilly Auto Parts Series, Busch, the 2004 Rookie of the Year and 2009 series champion, has won 102 races, ranking him first for all-time series wins. He has held the record since his 50th win, the 2011 Food City 250 at Bristol Motor Speedway, surpassing Mark Martin. By winning the 2021 Tennessee Lottery 250 at Nashville Superspeedway, Busch became the third driver in history to have won at least 100 races in one of NASCAR's three national series, the other two being Richard Petty and David Pearson, and the first to accomplish the feat in the O'Reilly Auto Parts Series. He was initially the winner of the 2020 My Bariatric Solutions 300 at Texas Motor Speedway, but was disqualified after his car failed post-race inspection.

NASCAR O'Reilly Auto Parts Series victories
No.	Date	Season	Race	Track	Ref.
1	May 14, 2004	2004	Funai 250	Richmond International Raceway	
2	May 29, 2004	2004	Carquest Auto Parts 300	Lowe's Motor Speedway	
3	June 19, 2004	2004	Meijer 300	Kentucky Speedway	
4	August 7, 2004	2004	Kroger 200	Indianapolis Raceway Park	
5	August 21, 2004	2004	Cabela's 250	Michigan International Speedway	
6	May 28, 2005	2005	Carquest Auto Parts 300	Lowe's Motor Speedway	
7	March 25, 2006	2006	Sharpie Mini 300	Bristol Motor Speedway	
8	July 7, 2007	2007	Winn Dixie 250	Daytona International Speedway	
9	September 7, 2007	2007	Emerson Radio 250	Richmond International Raceway	
10	September 29, 2007	2007	Yellow Transportation 300	Kansas Speedway	
11	November 10, 2007	2007	Arizona Travel 200	Phoenix International Raceway	
12	April 5, 2008	2008	O'Reilly 300	Texas Motor Speedway	
13	April 11, 2008	2008	Bashas' Supermarkets 200	Phoenix International Raceway	
14	April 20, 2008	2008	Corona Mexico 200	Autódromo Hermanos Rodríguez	
15	May 24, 2008	2008	Carquest Auto Parts 300	Lowe's Motor Speedway	
16	July 11, 2008	2008	Dollar General 300	Chicagoland Speedway	
17	July 26, 2008	2008	Kroger 200	O'Reilly Raceway Park	
18	August 30, 2008	2008	Camping World RV Service 300	Auto Club Speedway	
19	September 20, 2008	2008	Camping World RV Sales 200	Dover International Speedway	
20	October 10, 2008	2008	Dollar General 300	Lowe's Motor Speedway	
21	November 1, 2008	2008	O'Reilly Challenge	Texas Motor Speedway	
22	February 21, 2009	2009	Stater Brothers 300	Auto Club Speedway	
23	April 4, 2009	2009	O'Reilly 300	Texas Motor Speedway	
24	May 1, 2009	2009	Lipton Tea 250	Richmond International Raceway	
25	June 6, 2009	2009	Federated Auto Parts 300	Nashville Superspeedway	
26	June 27, 2009	2009	Camping World RV Sales 200	New Hampshire Motor Speedway	
27	July 18, 2009	2009	Missouri-Illinois Dodge Dealers 250	Gateway International Raceway	
28	October 16, 2009	2009	Dollar General 300	Lowe's Motor Speedway	
29	November 7, 2009	2009	O'Reilly Challenge	Texas Motor Speedway	
30	November 21, 2009	2009	Ford 300	Homestead–Miami Speedway	
31	February 20, 2010	2010	Stater Brothers 300	Auto Club Speedway	
32	April 9, 2010	2010	Bashas' Supermarkets 200	Phoenix International Raceway	
33	April 19, 2010	2010	O'Reilly Auto Parts 300	Texas Motor Speedway	
34	May 15, 2010	2010	Heluva Good! 200	Dover International Speedway	
35	May 29, 2010	2010	Tech-Net Auto Service 300	Charlotte Motor Speedway	
36	June 26, 2010	2010	New England 200	New Hampshire Motor Speedway	
37	July 9, 2010	2010	Dollar General 300	Chicagoland Speedway	
38	July 24, 2010	2010	Kroger 200	O'Reilly Raceway Park	
39	July 31, 2010	2010	U.S. Cellular 250	Iowa Speedway	
40	August 20, 2010	2010	Food City 250	Bristol Motor Speedway	
41	September 25, 2010	2010	Dover 200	Dover International Speedway	
42	October 9, 2010	2010	CampingWorld.com 300	Auto Club Speedway	
43	November 20, 2010	2010	Ford 300	Homestead–Miami Speedway	
44	February 26, 2011	2011	Bashas' Supermarkets 200	Phoenix International Raceway	
45	March 19, 2011	2011	Scotts EZ Seed 300	Bristol Motor Speedway	
46	March 26, 2011	2011	Royal Purple 300	Auto Club Speedway	
47	April 16, 2011	2011	Aaron's 312	Talladega Superspeedway	
48	May 6, 2011	2011	Royal Purple 200	Darlington Raceway	
49	July 16, 2011	2011	New England 200	New Hampshire Motor Speedway	
50	August 26, 2011	2011	Food City 250	Bristol Motor Speedway	
51	September 9, 2011	2011	Virginia 529 College Savings 250	Richmond International Raceway	
52	March 2, 2013	2013	Dollar General 200	Phoenix International Raceway	
53	March 16, 2013	2013	Jeff Foxworthy's Grit Chips 300	Bristol Motor Speedway	
54	March 23, 2013	2013	Royal Purple 300	Auto Club Speedway	
55	April 12, 2013	2013	O'Reilly Auto Parts 300	Texas Motor Speedway	
56	May 10, 2013	2013	VFW Sport Clips Help a Hero 200	Darlington Raceway	
57	May 25, 2013	2013	History 300	Charlotte Motor Speedway	
58	July 13, 2013	2013	CNBC Prime's The Profit 200	New Hampshire Motor Speedway	
59	July 27, 2013	2013	Indiana 250	Indianapolis Motor Speedway	
60	August 23, 2013	2013	Food City 250	Bristol Motor Speedway	
61	September 14, 2013	2013	Dollar General 300	Chicagoland Speedway	
62	October 11, 2013	2013	Dollar General 300	Charlotte Motor Speedway	
63	November 9, 2013	2013	ServiceMaster 200	Phoenix International Raceway	
64	March 1, 2014	2014	Blue Jeans Go Green 200	Phoenix International Raceway	
65	March 15, 2014	2014	Drive to Stop Diabetes 300	Bristol Motor Speedway	
66	May 31, 2014	2014	Buckle Up 200	Dover International Speedway	
67	September 5, 2014	2014	Virginia 529 College Savings 250	Richmond International Raceway	
68	September 27, 2014	2014	Dover 200	Dover International Speedway	
69	October 4, 2014	2014	Kansas Lottery 300	Kansas Speedway	
70	November 1, 2014	2014	O'Reilly Auto Parts Challenge	Texas Motor Speedway	
71	June 13, 2015	2015	Great Clips 250	Michigan International Speedway	
72	July 25, 2015	2015	Lilly Diabetes 250	Indianapolis Motor Speedway	
73	August 21, 2015	2015	Food City 300	Bristol Motor Speedway	
74	September 19, 2015	2015	Furious 7 300	Chicagoland Speedway	
75	October 17, 2015	2015	Kansas Lottery 300	Kansas Speedway	
76	November 14, 2015	2015	DAV 200	Phoenix International Raceway	
77	February 27, 2016	2016	Heads Up Georgia 250	Atlanta Motor Speedway	
78	March 5, 2016	2016	Boyd Gaming 300	Las Vegas Motor Speedway	
79	March 12, 2016	2016	Axalta Faster. Tougher. Brighter. 200	Phoenix International Raceway	
80	April 8, 2016	2016	O'Reilly Auto Parts 300	Texas Motor Speedway	
81	July 8, 2016	2016	Alsco 300	Kentucky Speedway	
82	July 16, 2016	2016	AutoLotto 200	New Hampshire Motor Speedway	
83	July 23, 2016	2016	Lilly Diabetes 250	Indianapolis Motor Speedway	
84	September 9, 2016	2016	Virginia 529 College Savings 250	Richmond International Raceway	
85	October 15, 2016	2016	Kansas Lottery 300	Kansas Speedway	
86	November 12, 2016	2016	Ticket Galaxy 200	Phoenix International Raceway	
87	March 4, 2017	2017	Rinnai 250	Atlanta Motor Speedway	
88	July 8, 2017	2017	Alsco 300	Kentucky Speedway	
89	July 15, 2017	2017	Overton's 200	New Hampshire Motor Speedway	
90	August 5, 2017	2017	Zippo 200 at The Glen	Watkins Glen International	
91	August 18, 2017	2017	Food City 300	Bristol Motor Speedway	
92	June 2, 2018	2018	Pocono Green 250	Pocono Raceway	
93	March 2, 2019	2019	Boyd Gaming 300	Las Vegas Motor Speedway	
94	March 9, 2019	2019	iK9 Service Dog 200	ISM Raceway	
95	March 30, 2019	2019	My Bariatric Solutions 300	Texas Motor Speedway	
96	September 5, 2019	2019	Indiana 250	Indianapolis Motor Speedway	
97	May 25, 2020	2020	Alsco 300	Charlotte Motor Speedway	
98	May 22, 2021	2021	Pit Boss 250	Circuit of the Americas	
99	June 12, 2021	2021	Alsco Uniforms 250	Texas Motor Speedway	
100	June 19, 2021	2021	Tennessee Lottery 250	Nashville Superspeedway	
101	July 3, 2021	2021	Henry 180	Road America	
102	July 10, 2021	2021	Credit Karma Money 250	Atlanta Motor Speedway	

=== Craftsman Truck Series ===
In the third-tier NASCAR Craftsman Truck Series, Busch won 69 races, the most of any driver in the series' history. Ron Hornaday Jr., a 51-time winner, held the record until Busch earned his 52nd win in the 2019 Ultimate Tailgating 200 at Atlanta Motor Speedway. Busch also operated a team in the Truck Series, named Kyle Busch Motorsports, which won 100 races from 2010 to 2023 before being sold to Spire Motorsports. He won 48 races for his team, including their 100th and final victory in the 2023 CRC Brakleen 150 at Pocono Raceway.

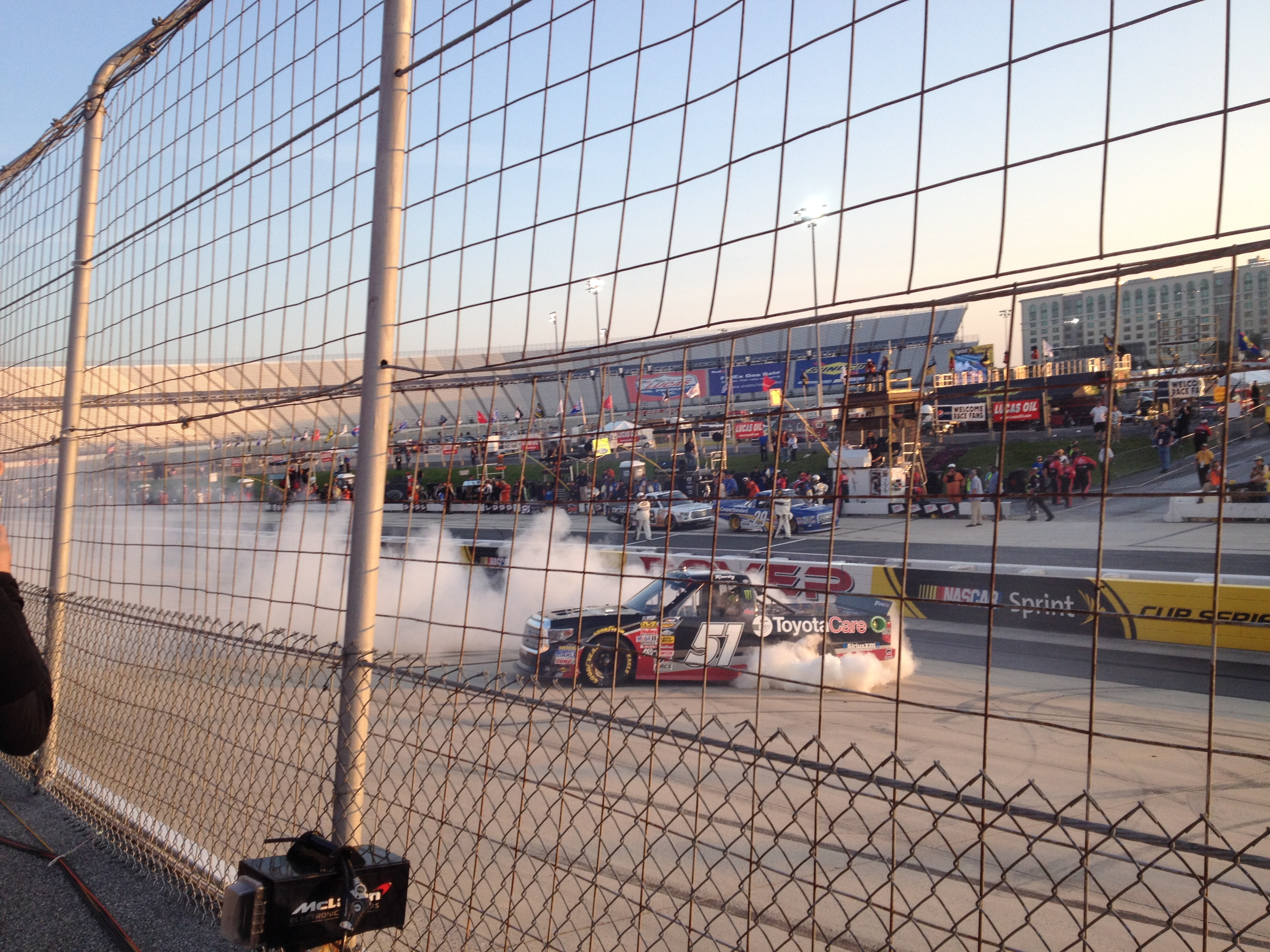
Busch performing a burnout at the 2014 Lucas Oil 200

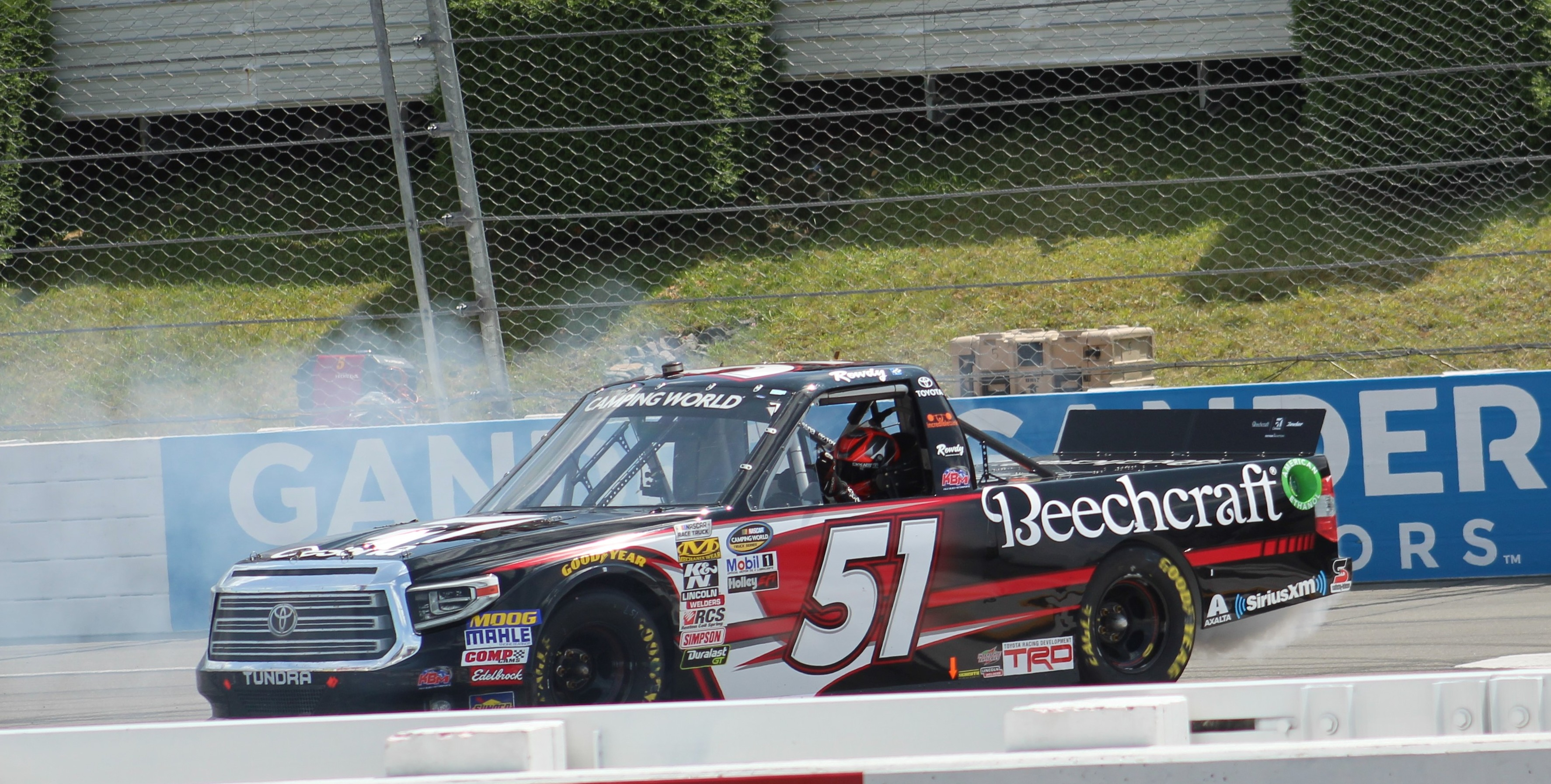
Busch performing a burnout at the 2018 Gander Outdoors 150

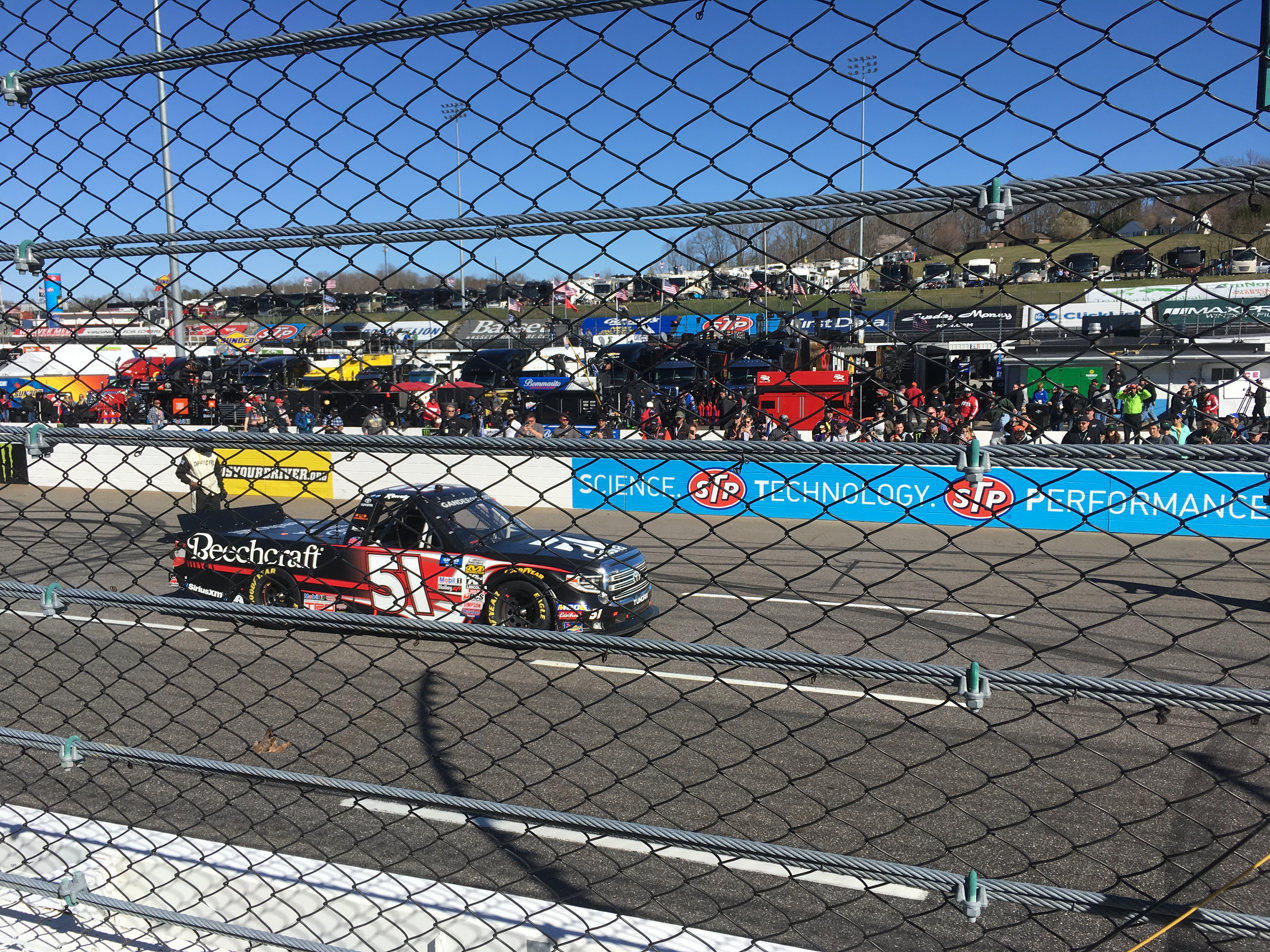
Busch sitting inside his truck on the frontstretch following the conclusion of the 2019 TruNorth Global 250.

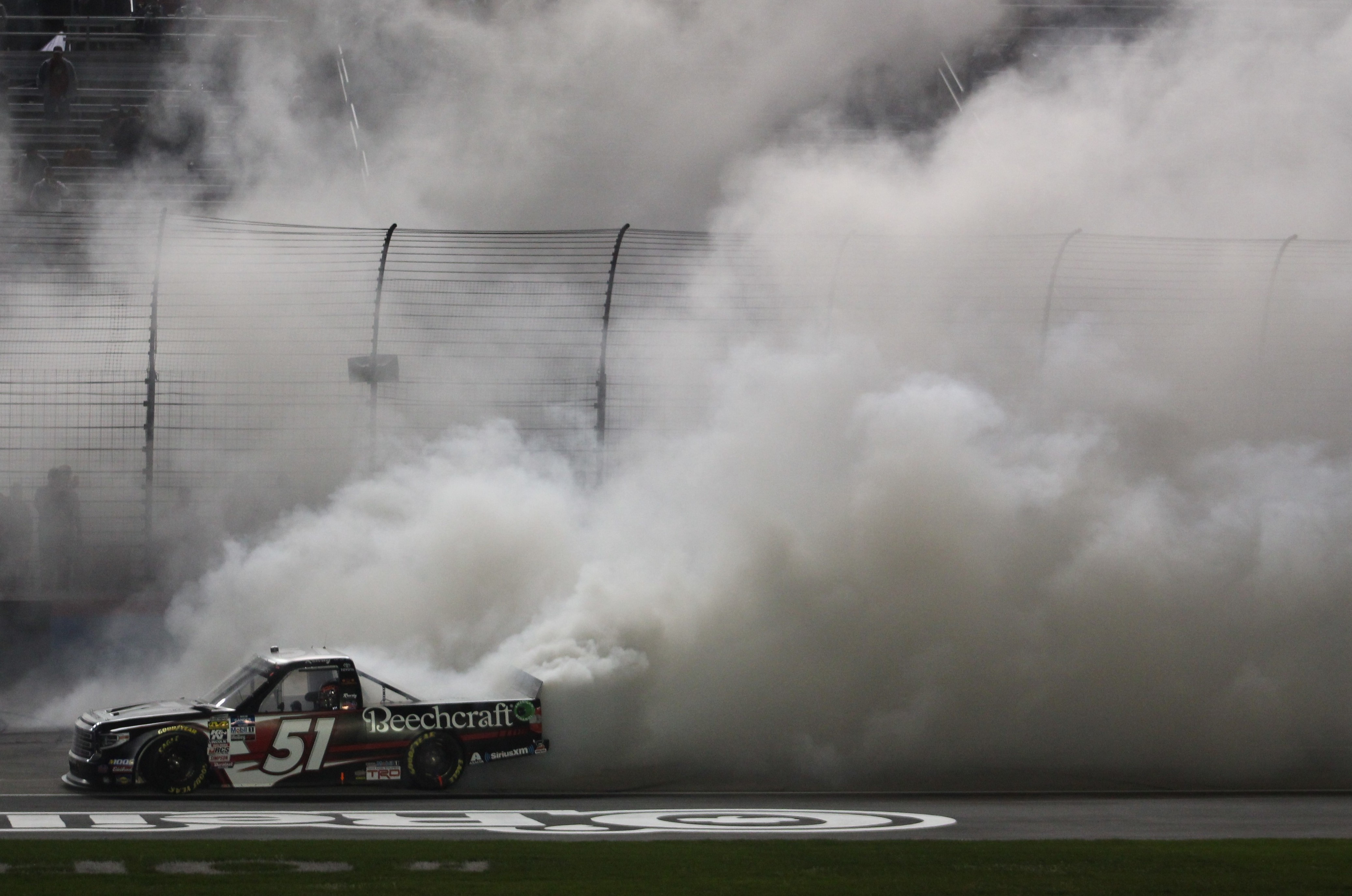
Busch performing a burnout at the 2019 Vankor 350.

Busch rolling off of pit road in the 2026 Fr8 208, his first win of 2026, and second to final win in NASCAR.

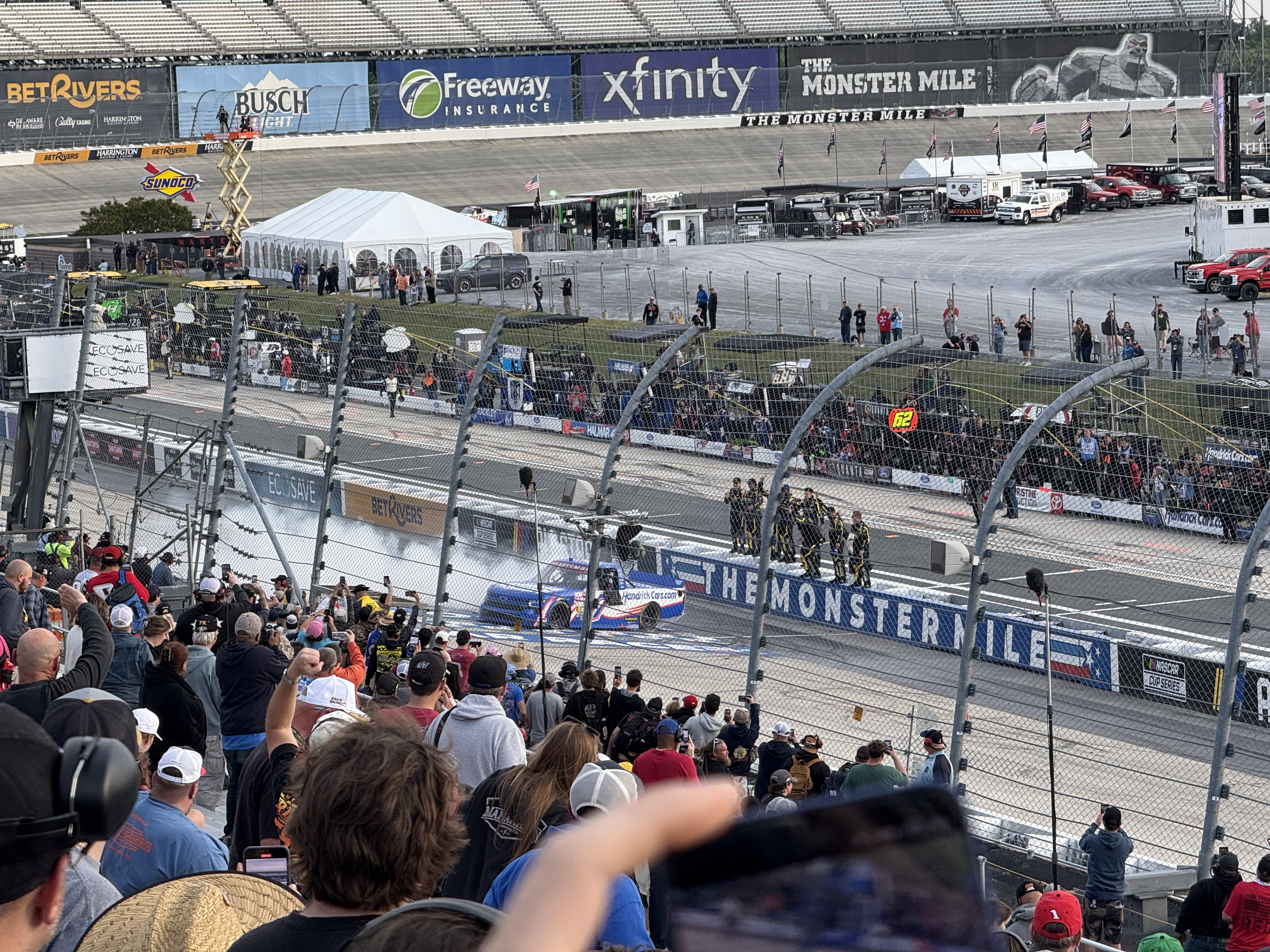
Busch performing a burnout at the 2026 Ecosave 200, his final NASCAR win.

NASCAR Craftsman Truck Series victories
No.	Date	Season	Race	Track	Ref.
1	May 20, 2005	2005	Quaker Steak & Lube 200	Charlotte Motor Speedway	
2	June 4, 2005	2005	MBNA RacePoints 200	Dover Motor Speedway	
3	October 29, 2005	2005	EasyCare Vehicle Service Contracts 200	Atlanta Motor Speedway	
4	May 19, 2006	2006	Quaker Steak & Lube 200	Lowe's Motor Speedway	
5	October 27, 2007	2007	Easy Care Vehicle Service Contracts 200	Atlanta Motor Speedway	
6	November 9, 2007	2007	2007 Casino Arizona 150	Phoenix Raceway	
7	February 23, 2008	2008	San Bernardino County 200	Auto Club Speedway	
8	March 7, 2008	2008	American Commercial Lines 200	Atlanta Motor Speedway	
9	August 20, 2008	2008	O'Reilly 200	Bristol Motor Speedway	
10	February 21, 2009	2009	San Bernardino County 200	Auto Club Speedway	
11	March 7, 2009	2009	American Commercial Lines 200	Atlanta Motor Speedway	
12	August 19, 2009	2009	O'Reilly 200	Bristol Motor Speedway	
13	August 28, 2009	2009	EnjoyIllinois.com 225	Chicagoland Speedway	
14	September 19, 2009	2009	Heluva Good! 200	New Hampshire Motor Speedway	
15	October 31, 2009	2009	Mountain Dew 250	Talladega Superspeedway	
16	November 6, 2009	2009	WinStar World Casino 350	Texas Motor Speedway	
17	April 2, 2010	2010	Nashville 200	Nashville Superspeedway	
18	May 21, 2010	2010	North Carolina Education Lottery 200	Charlotte Motor Speedway	
19	August 18, 2010	2010	O'Reilly 200	Bristol Motor Speedway	
20	August 27, 2010	2010	EnjoyIllinois.com 225	Chicagoland Speedway	
21	September 18, 2010	2010	TheRaceDayRaffleSeries.com 175	New Hampshire Motor Speedway	
22	October 30, 2010	2010	Mountain Dew 250	Talladega Superspeedway	
23	November 5, 2010	2010	WinStar World Casino 350k	Texas Motor Speedway	
24	November 19, 2010	2010	Ford 200	Homestead–Miami Speedway	
25	February 25, 2011	2011	Lucas Oil 150	Phoenix International Raceway	
26	April 22, 2011	2011	Bully Hill Vineyards 200	Nashville Superspeedway	
27	May 13, 2011	2011	Lucas Oil 200	Dover Motor Speedway	
28	May 20, 2011	2011	North Carolina Education Lottery 200	Charlotte Motor Speedway	
29	July 7, 2011	2011	UNOH 225	Kentucky Speedway	
30	September 24, 2011	2011	F.W. Webb 175	New Hampshire Motor Speedway	
31	May 17, 2013	2013	North Carolina Education Lottery 200	Charlotte Motor Speedway	
32	May 31, 2013	2013	Lucas Oil 200	Dover Motor Speedway	
33	August 21, 2013	2013	UNOH 200	Bristol Motor Speedway	
34	September 13, 2013	2013	EnjoyIllinois.com 225	Chicagoland Speedway	
35	November 15, 2013	2013	Ford EcoBoost 200	Homestead–Miami Speedway	
36	February 21, 2014	2014	NextEra Energy Resources 250	Daytona International Speedway	
37	May 9, 2014	2014	SFP 250	Kansas Speedway	
38	May 16, 2014	2014	North Carolina Education Lottery 200	Charlotte Motor Speedway	
39	May 30, 2014	2014	Lucas Oil 200	Dover Motor Speedway	
40	June 26, 2014	2014	UNOH 225	Kentucky Speedway	
41	September 13, 2014	2014	Lucas Oil 225	Chicagoland Speedway	
42	October 31, 2014	2014	WinStar World Casino & Resort 350	Texas Motor Speedway	
43	August 1, 2015	2015	Pocono Mountains 150	Pocono Raceway	
44	August 15, 2015	2015	Careers for Veterans 200	Michigan International Speedway	
45	April 2, 2016	2016	Alpha Energy Solutions 250	Martinsville Speedway	
46	September 16, 2016	2016	American Ethanol E15 225	Chicagoland Speedway	
47	May 12, 2017	2017	Toyota Tundra 250	Kansas Speedway	
48	May 19, 2017	2017	North Carolina Education Lottery 200	Charlotte Motor Speedway	
49	August 16, 2017	2017	UNOH 200	Bristol Motor Speedway	
50	March 2, 2018	2018	Stratosphere 200	Las Vegas Motor Speedway	
51	July 28, 2018	2018	Gander Outdoors 150	Pocono Raceway	
52	February 23, 2019	2019	Ultimate Tailgating 200	Atlanta Motor Speedway	
53	March 1, 2019	2019	Strat 200	Las Vegas Motor Speedway	
54	March 23, 2019	2019	TruNorth Global 250	Martinsville Speedway	
55	March 29, 2019	2019	Vankor 350	Texas Motor Speedway	
56	May 17, 2019	2019	North Carolina Education Lottery 200	Charlotte Motor Speedway	
57	February 21, 2020	2020	Strat 200	Las Vegas Motor Speedway	
58	June 13, 2020	2020	Baptist Health 200	Homestead–Miami Speedway	
59	July 18, 2020	2020	Vankor 350	Texas Motor Speedway	
60	March 20, 2021	2021	Fr8Auctions 200	Atlanta Motor Speedway	
61	May 1, 2021	2021	WISE Power 200	Kansas Speedway	
62	June 11, 2022	2022	DoorDash 250	Sonoma Raceway	
63	March 3, 2023	2023	Victoria's Voice Foundation 200	Las Vegas Motor Speedway	
64	July 22, 2023	2023	CRC Brakleen 150	Pocono Raceway	
65	February 24, 2024	2024	Fr8 208	Atlanta Motor Speedway	
66	April 12, 2024	2024	SpeedyCash.com 250	Texas Motor Speedway	
67	February 22, 2025	2025	Fr8 208	Atlanta Motor Speedway	
68	February 21, 2026	2026	Fr8 208	Atlanta Motor Speedway	
69	May 15, 2026	2026	Ecosave 200	Dover Motor Speedway	

== ARCA ==
=== Menards Series ===
In the ARCA Menards Series, usually considered the fourth-level series of NASCAR, Busch won three of the nine races that he started.

ARCA Menards Series victories
No.	Date	Season	Race	Track	Ref.
1	April 11, 2003	2003	PFG Lester 150	Nashville Superspeedway	
2	May 10, 2003	2003	The Channel 5 205	Kentucky Speedway	
3	February 7, 2004	2004	Advance Discount Auto Parts 200	Daytona International Speedway	

=== Menards Series East ===
Busch won in his only start in the ARCA Menards Series East, which primarily races on short tracks in the East Coast of the United States. The series was sanctioned by NASCAR at the time of Busch's win.

ARCA Menards Series East victory
No.	Date	Season	Race	Track	Ref.
1	May 17, 2009	2009	Long John Silver's 200	Iowa Speedway	

== See also ==
- List of all-time NASCAR Cup Series winners
