= 2023 in NASCAR =

In 2023, NASCAR sanctioned three national series:

- 2023 NASCAR Cup Series – the top racing series in NASCAR
- 2023 NASCAR Xfinity Series – the second-highest racing series in NASCAR
- 2023 NASCAR Craftsman Truck Series – the third-highest racing series in NASCAR

Preceded by 2022 in NASCAR	NASCAR seasons 2023	Succeeded by 2024 in NASCAR
