= 2024 in NASCAR =

American motorsport season

In 2024 NASCAR sanctioned three national series, three ARCA series, and four international series, two local series, and three esports series:

- 2024 NASCAR Cup Series – the top racing series in NASCAR
- 2024 NASCAR Xfinity Series – the second-highest racing series in NASCAR
- 2024 NASCAR Craftsman Truck Series – the third-highest racing series in NASCAR
- 2024 ARCA Menards Series
- 2024 ARCA Menards Series East
- 2024 ARCA Menards Series West
- 2024 NASCAR Whelen Modified Tour
- NASCAR Advance Auto Parts Weekly Series
- 2024 NASCAR Pinty's Series
- 2024 NASCAR Whelen Euro Series
- 2024 NASCAR Mexico Series
- 2024 NASCAR Brasil Sprint Race
- eNASCAR Coca-Cola iRacing Series
- eNASCAR College iRacing Series
- D-BOX eNASCAR International iRacing Series

Preceded by 2023 in NASCAR	NASCAR seasons 2024	Succeeded by 2025 in NASCAR
