= 2021 in NASCAR =

In 2021 NASCAR sanctioned three national series:

- 2021 NASCAR Cup Series – the top racing series in NASCAR
- 2021 NASCAR Xfinity Series – the second-highest racing series in NASCAR
- 2021 NASCAR Camping World Truck Series – the third-highest racing series in NASCAR

Preceded by 2020 in NASCAR	NASCAR seasons 2021	Succeeded by 2022 in NASCAR
