= 2022 in NASCAR =

In 2022, NASCAR sanctioned three national series:

- 2022 NASCAR Cup Series – the top racing series in NASCAR
- 2022 NASCAR Xfinity Series – the second-highest racing series in NASCAR
- 2022 NASCAR Camping World Truck Series – the third-highest racing series in NASCAR

Preceded by 2021 in NASCAR	NASCAR seasons 2022	Succeeded by 2023 in NASCAR
