= 2025 in NASCAR =

American motorsport season

In 2025, NASCAR sanctioned three national series, four regional series, four international series, and three esports series:

== National Series ==
- 2025 NASCAR Cup Series, which featured the first "Mexico City event"
- 2025 NASCAR Xfinity Series
- 2025 NASCAR Craftsman Truck Series

== Regional Series ==
- 2025 ARCA Menards Series
- 2025 ARCA Menards Series East
- 2025 ARCA Menards Series West
- 2025 NASCAR Whelen Modified Tour

== International Series ==
- 2025 NASCAR Canada Series
- 2025 NASCAR Mexico Series
- 2025 NASCAR Euro Series
- 2025 NASCAR Brasil Series

== Esports Series ==
- 2025 eNASCAR Coca-Cola iRacing Series
- 2025 eNASCAR College iRacing Series
- 2025 D-BOX eNASCAR International iRacing Series

Preceded by 2024 in NASCAR	NASCAR seasons 2025	Succeeded by 2026 in NASCAR
