= 2009 in NASCAR =

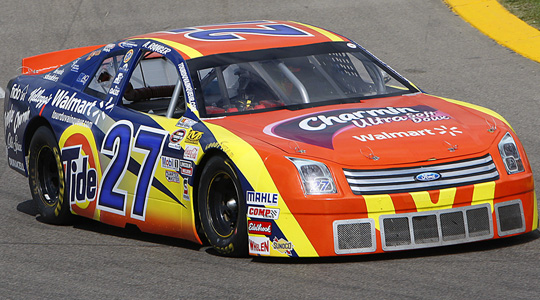
Andrew Ranger in the #27 Ford during the 2009 NASCAR Canadian Tire Series season.

There were three NASCAR national series in 2009:

- 2009 NASCAR Sprint Cup Series - The top racing series in NASCAR
- 2009 NASCAR Nationwide Series - The second-highest racing series in NASCAR
- 2009 NASCAR Camping World Truck Series - The third-highest racing series in NASCAR

| Preceded by 2008 in NASCAR | NASCAR seasons 2009 | Succeeded by 2010 in NASCAR |
