= 2010 in NASCAR =

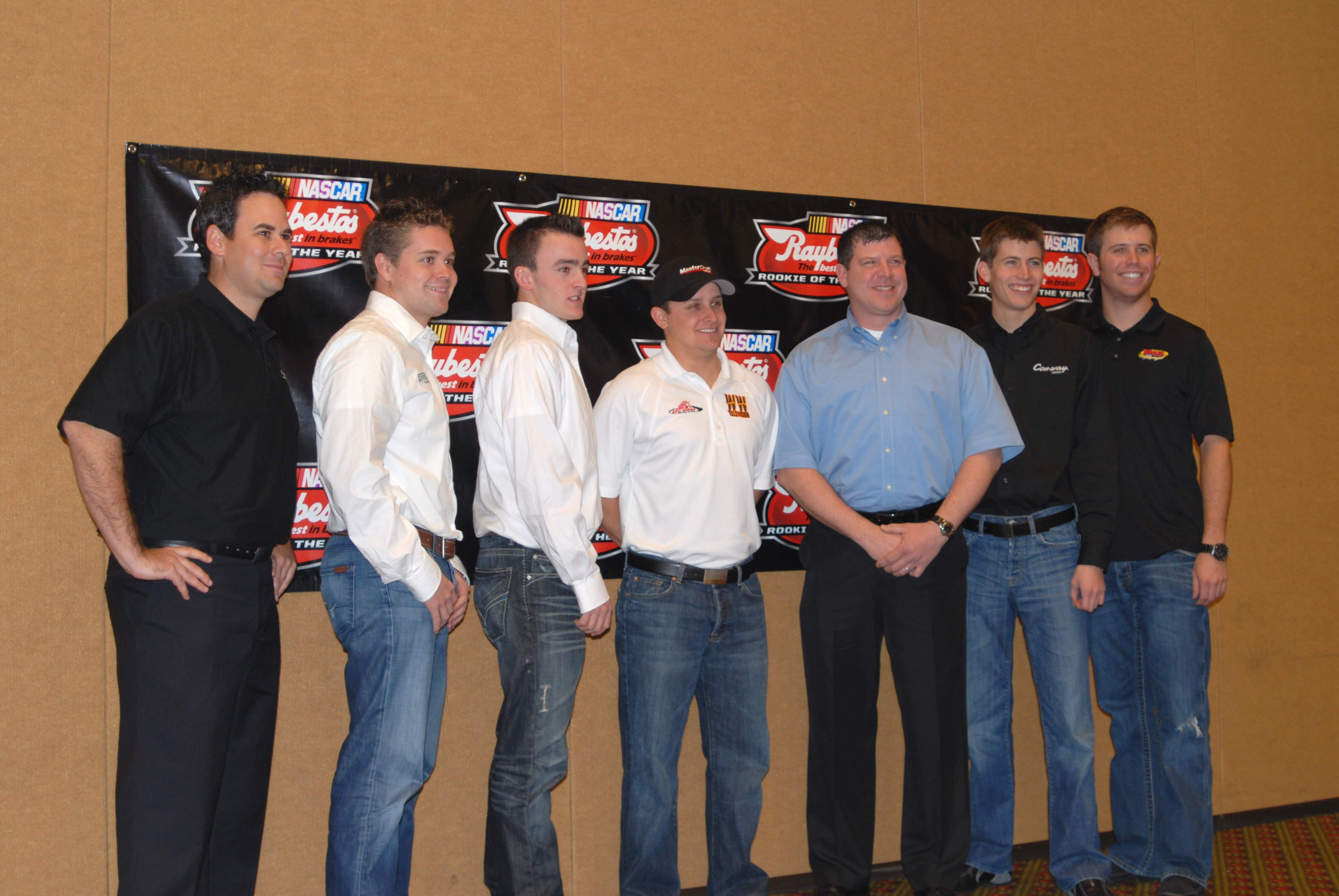
The 2010 w:NASCAR Rookie of the Year class at the National Motorsports Press Association hall of fame event.

There were three NASCAR national series in 2010:

== National series ==
- 2010 NASCAR Sprint Cup Series – The top racing series in NASCAR
- 2010 NASCAR Nationwide Series – The second-highest racing series in NASCAR
- 2010 NASCAR Camping World Truck Series – The third-highest racing series in NASCAR

== Regional series ==
- 2010 NASCAR Canadian Tire Series – Canadian regional series
- 2010 NASCAR Corona Series – Premiere NASCAR Mexico series
- 2010 NASCAR Mini Stock Series –Secondary NASCAR Mexico series

Preceded by 2009 in NASCAR	NASCAR seasons 2010	Succeeded by 2011 in NASCAR
