= 2026 in NASCAR =

American motorsport season

In 2026, NASCAR sanctioned three national series, four regional series, four international series, and three esports series:

== National Series ==
- 2026 NASCAR Cup Series
- 2026 NASCAR O'Reilly Auto Parts Series
- 2026 NASCAR Craftsman Truck Series

== Regional Series ==
- 2026 ARCA Menards Series
- 2026 ARCA Menards Series East
- 2026 ARCA Menards Series West
- 2026 NASCAR Whelen Modified Tour

== International Series ==
- 2026 NASCAR Canada Series
- 2026 NASCAR Mexico Series
- 2026 NASCAR Euro Series
- 2026 NASCAR Brasil Series

== Esports Series ==
- 2026 eNASCAR Coca-Cola iRacing Championship Series
- 2026 eNASCAR College iRacing Series
- 2026 D-BOX eNASCAR International iRacing Series

Preceded by 2025 in NASCAR	NASCAR seasons 2026	Succeeded by 2027 in NASCAR
