= List of NASCAR seasons =

The National Association for Stock Car Auto Racing (NASCAR) is the official sanctioning body of the sport of stock car racing that is in North America. It was formed in February 1948 by race car driver Bill France Sr. as the replacement for the National Championship Stock Car Circuit sanctioning body. NASCAR sanctions the top level national NASCAR Cup Series, the second national series proving ground NASCAR O'Reilly Auto Parts Series, the third national series NASCAR Craftsman Truck Series for modified pickup trucks, as well as a series of American regional championships. The NASCAR championship season consists of a series of races, held usually on oval tracks, and in a few cases, road courses. Each season throughout NASCAR history has consisted of between 8 and 63 races.

The results of each race are combined to determine two championships in each of the top series, one for drivers and one for manufacturers. The Drivers' Championship is awarded to each division's most successful NASCAR driver over a season, as determined by a points system, and has been awarded since the first NASCAR season in 1949. The Manufacturers' Championship is awarded to the each division's most successful NASCAR manufacturer over a season, also determined by a points system based on race results. The Manufacturers' Championship was first awarded in 1952.

== Seasons ==
Note: In any given season, the overall Manufacturer's champion may not been the supplier to the overall Driver's champion.

=== Cup Series ===
Season	Races	Drivers' champion	Manufacturer
1949	8	Red Byron	Not awarded
1950	19	Bill Rexford	Not awarded
1951	41	Herb Thomas (1)	Not awarded
1952	34	Tim Flock (1)	Hudson (1)
1953	37	Herb Thomas (2)	Hudson (2)
1954	37	Lee Petty (1)	Hudson (3)
1955	45	Tim Flock (2)	Oldsmobile (1)
1956	56	Buck Baker (1)	Ford (1)
1957	53	Buck Baker (2)	Ford (2)
1958	51	Lee Petty (2)	Chevrolet (1)
1959	44	Lee Petty (3)	Chevrolet (2)
1960	44	Rex White	Chevrolet (3)
1961	52	Ned Jarrett (1)	Chevrolet (4)
1962	53	Joe Weatherly (1)	Pontiac (1)
1963	55	Joe Weatherly (2)	Ford (3)
1964	62	Richard Petty (1)	Ford (4)
1965	55	Ned Jarrett (2)	Ford (5)
1966	49	David Pearson (1)	Ford (6)
1967	49	Richard Petty (2)	Ford (7)
1968	49	David Pearson (2)	Ford (8)
1969	54	David Pearson (3)	Ford (9)
1970	48	Bobby Isaac	Dodge
1971	48	Richard Petty (3)	Plymouth
1972	31	Richard Petty (4)	Chevrolet (5)
1973	28	Benny Parsons	Chevrolet (6)
1974	30	Richard Petty (5)	Chevrolet (7)
1975	30	Richard Petty (6)	Dodge (2)
1976	30	Cale Yarborough (1)	Chevrolet (8)
1977	30	Cale Yarborough (2)	Chevrolet (9)
1978	30	Cale Yarborough (3)	Chevrolet (10)
1979	31	Richard Petty (7)	Chevrolet (11)
1980	31	Dale Earnhardt (1)	Chevrolet (12)
1981	31	Darrell Waltrip (1)	Buick (1)
1982	30	Darrell Waltrip (2)	Buick (2)
1983	30	Bobby Allison	Chevrolet (13)
1984	30	Terry Labonte (1)	Chevrolet (14)
1985	28	Darrell Waltrip (3)	Chevrolet (15)
1986	29	Dale Earnhardt (2)	Chevrolet (16)
1987	29	Dale Earnhardt (3)	Chevrolet (17)
1988	29	Bill Elliott	Chevrolet (18)
1989	29	Rusty Wallace	Chevrolet (19)
1990	29	Dale Earnhardt (4)	Chevrolet (20)
1991	29	Dale Earnhardt (5)	Chevrolet (21)
1992	29	Alan Kulwicki	Ford (10)
1993	30	Dale Earnhardt (6)	Chevrolet (22)
1994	31	Dale Earnhardt (7)	Ford (11)
1995	31	Jeff Gordon (1)	Chevrolet (23)
1996	31	Terry Labonte (2)	Chevrolet (24)
1997	32	Jeff Gordon (2)	Ford (12)
1998	33	Jeff Gordon (3)	Chevrolet (25)
1999	34	Dale Jarrett	Ford (13)
2000	34	Bobby Labonte	Ford (14)
2001	36	Jeff Gordon (4)	Chevrolet (26)
2002	36	Tony Stewart (1)	Ford (15)
2003	36	Matt Kenseth	Chevrolet (27)
2004	36	Kurt Busch	Chevrolet (28)
2005	36	Tony Stewart (2)	Chevrolet (29)
2006	36	Jimmie Johnson (1)	Chevrolet (30)
2007	36	Jimmie Johnson (2)	Chevrolet (31)
2008	36	Jimmie Johnson (3)	Chevrolet (32)
2009	36	Jimmie Johnson (4)	Chevrolet (33)
2010	36	Jimmie Johnson (5)	Chevrolet (34)
2011	36	Tony Stewart (3)	Chevrolet (35)
2012	36	Brad Keselowski	Chevrolet (36)
2013	36	Jimmie Johnson (6)	Chevrolet (37)
2014	36	Kevin Harvick	Chevrolet (38)
2015	36	Kyle Busch (1)	Chevrolet (39)
2016	36	Jimmie Johnson (7)	Toyota (1)
2017	36	Martin Truex Jr.	Toyota (2)
2018	36	Joey Logano (1)	Ford (16)
2019	36	Kyle Busch (2)	Toyota (3)
2020	36	Chase Elliott	Ford (17)
2021	36	Kyle Larson (1)	Chevrolet (40)
2022	36	Joey Logano (2)	Chevrolet (41)
2023	36	Ryan Blaney	Chevrolet (42)
2024	36	Joey Logano (3)	Chevrolet (43)
2025	36	Kyle Larson (2)	Chevrolet (44)
2026	36	Kyle Larson (3)	Toyota (4)
1949–2026	2,822	Total races over 77 seasons	

=== O’Reilly Auto Parts Series ===
Season	Races	Drivers' champion	Manufacturer
1982	29	Jack Ingram (1)	Pontiac (1)
1983	35	Sam Ard (1)	Oldsmobile (1)
1984	29	Sam Ard (2)	Pontiac (2)
1985	27	Jack Ingram (2)	Pontiac (3)
1986	31	Larry Pearson (1)	Pontiac (4)
1987	27	Larry Pearson (2)	Chevrolet (1)
1988	30	Tommy Ellis	Buick (1)
1989	29	Rob Moroso	Buick (2)
1990	31	Chuck Bown	Buick (3)
1991	31	Bobby Labonte	Oldsmobile (2)
1992	31	Joe Nemechek	Chevrolet (2)
1993	28	Steve Grissom	Chevrolet (3)
1994	28	David Green	Chevrolet (4)
1995	26	Johnny Benson Jr.	Ford (1)
1996	26	Randy LaJoie (1)	Chevrolet (5)
1997	30	Randy LaJoie (2)	Chevrolet (6)
1998	31	Dale Earnhardt Jr. (1)	Chevrolet (7)
1999	32	Dale Earnhardt Jr. (2)	Chevrolet (8)
2000	32	Jeff Green	Chevrolet (9)
2001	33	Kevin Harvick (1)	Chevrolet (10)
2002	34	Greg Biffle	Ford (2)
2003	34	Brian Vickers	Chevrolet (11)
2004	34	Martin Truex Jr. (1)	Chevrolet (12)
2005	35	Martin Truex Jr. (2)	Chevrolet (13)
2006	35	Kevin Harvick (2)	Chevrolet (14)
2007	35	Carl Edwards	Chevrolet (15)
2008	35	Clint Bowyer	Toyota (1)
2009	35	Kyle Busch	Toyota (2)
2010	35	Brad Keselowski	Toyota (3)
2011	34	Ricky Stenhouse Jr. (1)	Ford (3)
2012	33	Ricky Stenhouse Jr. (2)	Chevrolet (16)
2013	33	Austin Dillon	Ford (4)
2014	33	Chase Elliott	Chevrolet (17)
2015	33	Chris Buescher	Chevrolet (18)
2016	33	Daniel Suárez	Toyota (4)
2017	33	William Byron	Chevrolet (19)
2018	33	Tyler Reddick (1)	Chevrolet (20)
2019	33	Tyler Reddick (2)	Chevrolet (21)
2020	33	Austin Cindric	Chevrolet (22)
2021	33	Daniel Hemric	Chevrolet (23)
2022	33	Ty Gibbs	Chevrolet (24)
2023	33	Cole Custer	Chevrolet (25)
2024	33	Justin Allgaier	Chevrolet (26)
2025	33	Jesse Love	Chevrolet (26)
2026	33	Justin Allgaier (2)	Chevrolet (27)
1982–2026	1,427	Total races over 45 seasons	

=== Craftsman Truck Series ===
Season	Races	Drivers' champion	Manufacturer
1995	20	Mike Skinner	Chevrolet (1)
1996	24	Ron Hornaday Jr. (1)	Chevrolet (2)
1997	26	Jack Sprague (1)	Chevrolet (3)
1998	27	Ron Hornaday Jr. (2)	Chevrolet (4)
1999	25	Jack Sprague (2)	Ford (1)
2000	24	Greg Biffle	Ford (2)
2001	24	Jack Sprague (3)	Dodge (1)
2002	22	Mike Bliss	Chevrolet (5)
2003	25	Travis Kvapil	Dodge (2)
2004	25	Bobby Hamilton	Dodge (3)
2005	25	Ted Musgrave	Chevrolet (6)
2006	25	Todd Bodine (1)	Toyota (1)
2007	25	Ron Hornaday Jr. (3)	Toyota (2)
2008	25	Johnny Benson Jr.	Toyota (3)
2009	25	Ron Hornaday Jr. (4)	Toyota (4)
2010	25	Todd Bodine (2)	Toyota (5)
2011	25	Austin Dillon	Chevrolet (7)
2012	22	James Buescher	Chevrolet (8)
2013	22	Matt Crafton (1)	Toyota (6)
2014	22	Matt Crafton (2)	Toyota (7)
2015	23	Erik Jones	Toyota (8)
2016	23	Johnny Sauter	Toyota (9)
2017	23	Christopher Bell	Toyota (10)
2018	23	Brett Moffitt	Chevrolet (9)
2019	23	Matt Crafton (3)	Toyota (11)
2020	23	Sheldon Creed	Chevrolet (10)
2021	22	Ben Rhodes (1)	Toyota (12)
2022	23	Zane Smith	Toyota (13)
2023	23	Ben Rhodes (2)	Chevrolet (11)
2024	23	Ty Majeski	Chevrolet (12)
2025	25	Corey Heim	Toyota (14)
2026	25	Kaden Honeycutt	Ford (3)
1995–2026	762	Total races over 32 Seasons	
