= Morgan–McClure Motorsports =

American auto racing organization

- Owners: Tim Morgan; Larry McClure; Jerry McClure
- Base: Abingdon, Virginia, United States
- Series: NASCAR Cup Series
- Manufacturer: Pontiac; Chevrolet; Oldsmobile
- Opened: 1983
- Closed: 2012

Career
- Debut: 1983 Winston 500 (Talladega Superspeedway)
- Latest race: 2009 Sharpie 500 (Bristol Motor Speedway)
- Races competed: 703
- Drivers' Championships: 0
- Race victories: 14
- Pole positions: 13

Morgan–McClure Motorsports was an American auto racing team that competed in the NASCAR Cup Series full-time until 2007. It operated for 28 years, starting in 1983 and ending in 2012. The team was most notable for running the No. 4 from 1983 to 2010. The team notably won the Daytona 500 three times during the 1990s. They won with Ernie Irvan in 1991, then won back-to-back in 1994–1995 with Sterling Marlin. Irvan (1992) and Marlin (1996) also each won the Pepsi 400 for a total of five points-paying wins at Daytona for the team over a six-year period.

== History ==
=== Starting out ===
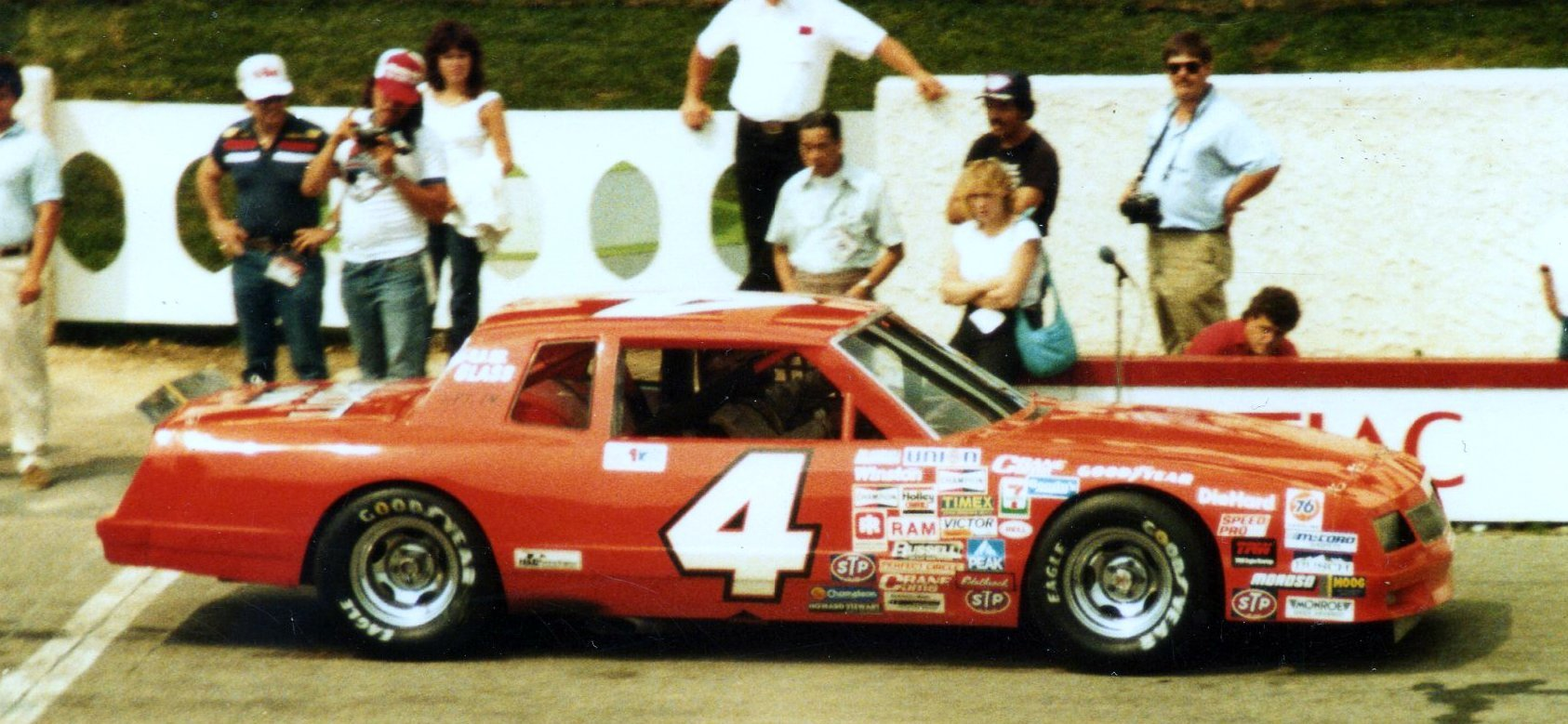
Tommy Ellis in 1984

Morgan–McClure Motorsports was owned by business partners Larry McClure and Tim Morgan. It began in 1983 when the two purchased a race car from G. C. Spencer. The car debuted at Talladega Superspeedway and was piloted by Connie Saylor. The car finished 40th after suffering engine failure. After firing Connie because they wanted a younger driver and after obtaining the rights to No. 4 & the car he drove for G. C. Spencer, Mark Martin took over the driving duties later that year, and had one top-10 finish. In 1984, the team signed Folgers as a sponsor and began racing as car No. 4. Tommy Ellis ran twenty races that year for the team, with Lennie Pond and Joe Ruttman running the rest of the schedule. Ruttman drove sixteen races for them next season, notching one top-5 and four top-10 finishes. In 1986, MMM got Eastman Kodak sponsorship and signed Rick Wilson to handle the driving chores. Wilson got the team its first pole position at Bristol Motor Speedway in 1988, its first full season on the circuit. When Wilson announced he was leaving the team in 1989, the team was eighth in points.

=== The prime years ===
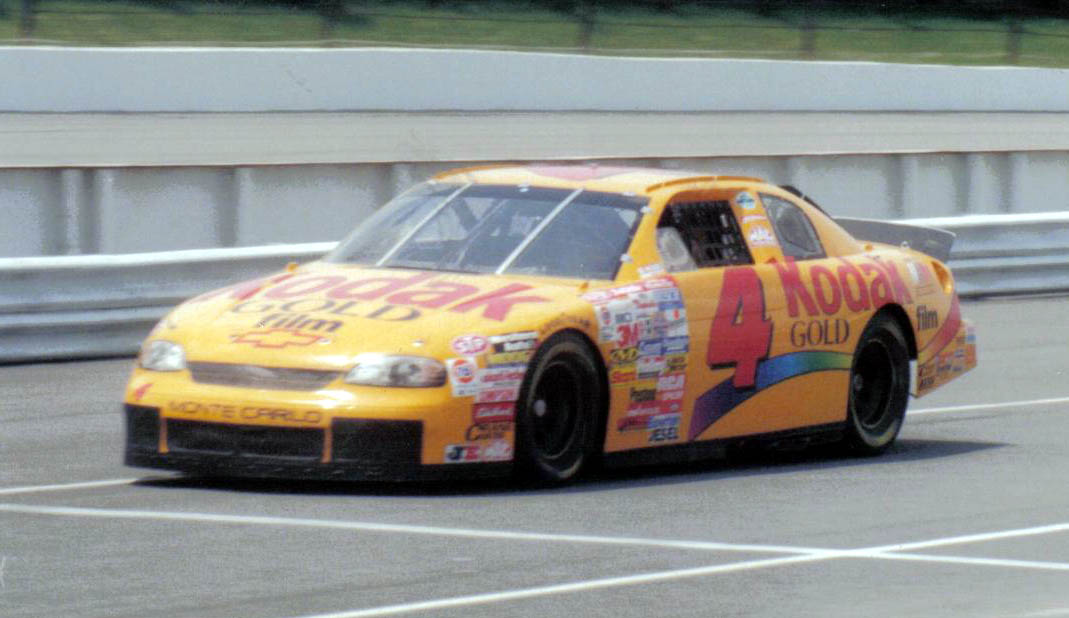
1997 car at Pocono

For the 1990 season, the team hired Phil Parsons, but after three races, Parsons was released in favor of Ernie Irvan. In his first race with the team, Irvan started 30th, and finished third. Two races later, Irvan won his first pole position at Bristol Motor Speedway. The team switched from Oldsmobile to Chevrolet in order to get more manufacturer support. Their first race after the switch was at the 1990 Bud at the Glen. Irvan picked up his first career victory, as well as the first victory for MMM the following week at Bristol, in the Busch 500. The next season, Irvan won the Daytona 500 and The Bud at the Glen (The latter was marred by the death of popular veteran J. D. McDuffie). When the checkered flag fell at the end of the season, the team was fifth in points. The next season, Irvan won three races over a two-month stretch, at Sears Point International Raceway, the Pepsi 400 at the Daytona International Speedway, and at Talladega Superspeedway, respectively. In 1993, Irvan won the pole twice, as well as a victory at Talladega. When Davey Allison died in an aircraft accident, Robert Yates asked Irvan to take his place. Irvan wanted out of his contract with MMM, and it ensued into an ugly lawsuit. Irvan was able to get out, but there were hurt feelings on both sides.

For the 1994 season, the team hired Sterling Marlin to drive. In his first race in the team, Marlin won the Daytona 500, beating out, ironically, Irvan. Marlin won the 500 the next year as well, in addition to two more races at Darlington Speedway and Talladega. In 1996, Marlin won two races, at Talladega and the Pepsi 400 at Daytona.

=== Struggles ===
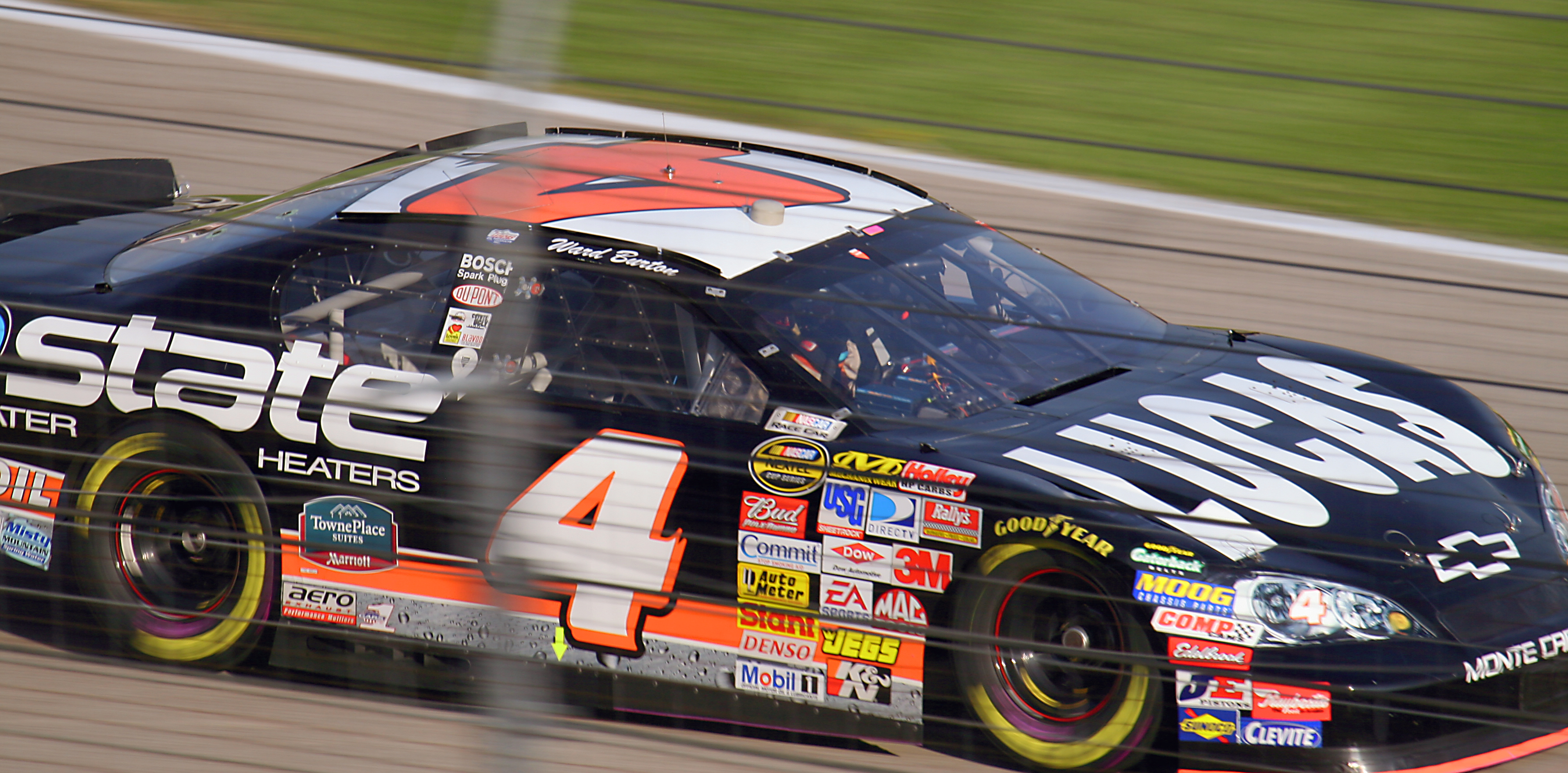
The No. 4 car in 2007

After the team went winless with Marlin in 1997, finishing 25th in points, the team and Marlin decided to part ways. MMM hired two-time race winner Bobby Hamilton. Hamilton led 378 out of 500 laps and won from the pole at Martinsville Speedway and finished 10th in the final points standings. Soon, the team was not able repeat its success, and Hamilton left for Andy Petree Racing in 2001. He was replaced by Robby Gordon, but Gordon struggled in the ride and was released after just five races. Mike Skinner and Kevin Lepage shared the driving duties for two years without much success. In 2003, MMM switched to Pontiac. They lost their Kodak sponsorship in 2004, but MMM remained open, switching back to Chevrolet (almost being required to do so, as Pontiac had withdrawn from the Cup series at the end of 2003). Jimmy Spencer drove the car most of that year, and team co-owner Larry McClure's son Eric drove another team car to finish 26th at Talladega Superspeedway. For 2005, the team signed Lucas Oil as a sponsor, and hired Mike Wallace to drive. Wallace was replaced by John Andretti, P. J. Jones, and Todd Bodine for some of the races in 2005. In 2006, Scott Wimmer was announced as the 2006 driver with new sponsorship from the Utah-based AERO Exhaust. Wimmer had an average start of 35th and average of finish 29th, no wins, top fives, or top tens. On October 3, 2006, Larry McClure announced that the team and Wimmer parted ways. They hired Todd Bodine to drive the next two races, Charlotte and Atlanta, until they could find a permanent replacement. The last three races the team hired veteran Ward Burton, who at the time had not driven in the Cup Series in several years. On December 12, 2006, MMM announced they signed Burton to take full-time seat in 2007 with sponsorship from State Water Heaters. Burton was released before the last race of the 2007 season. Furthermore, Morgan–McClure Motorsports shut down weeks shy of the 2008 Daytona 500 due to financial problems, but had agreed to let Mike Wallace drive in the 2008 Daytona 500 if sponsorship was found. Sponsorship was found, but Larry McClure said that he was tired of just sliding by and would come back when major sponsorship could be secured. When Tony Stewart announced on August 14 that Ryan Newman would drive the No. 4 car in 2009, Morgan–McClure Motorsports protested. Tim Morgan stated, "There's some sweat and history in that number 4. We feel like it ours," in an article for the Bristol Herald Courier. After discussions with MMM and NASCAR, on August 18 Stewart announced that Newman would drive the No. 39 instead of a No. 4 car in 2009. In 2014 Stewart did acquire the No. 4 to use with driver Kevin Harvick, who replaced Newman and the No. 39 in the 2014 season.

Rumors indicated that Morgan–McClure Motorsports would prepare a No. 4 Chevy to attempt the 2009 Daytona 500, but this did not happen. On April 11, 2009, the team made public their intentions to attempt the Aaron's 499 at Talladega Superspeedway with driver Eric McClure in the No. 4 Hefty/Walmart Chevy, however the team failed to qualify for the race. Scott Wimmer attempted to qualify the car at Bristol. Wimmer made the event, Morgan–McClure's first start since 2007. He finished 29th. Wimmer also attempted Dover but they were the only team to not qualify.

Since 2009, legal problems have prevented Morgan–McClure from actively competing. Larry McClure was charged with federal income tax fraud for not reporting $269,000 for cars used in the ARCA series. He was also forced to pay back $60,000 to Eastman-Kodak for falsifying an invoice. McClure spent eighteen months in jail and works at a family car dealership.

MMM returned to the Cup Series at Bristol in August 2010, but Kevin Lepage failed to qualify for the race. The team never attempted another race again, with their No. 4 being used by Red Bull Racing Team for Kasey Kahne in 2011 without any objections from Morgan-McClure. The team closed its doors in 2012. Larry McClure died June 25, 2025 at the age of 81.

== Driver history ==
- Connie Saylor (1983)
- Mark Martin (1983)
- Lennie Pond (1984)
- Tommy Ellis (1984)
- Joe Ruttman (1984–85)
- Rick Wilson (1986–89)
- Lake Speed (1986)
- A. J. Foyt (1987)
- Phil Parsons (1990)
- Ernie Irvan (1990–93)
- Jeff Purvis (1993)
- Joe Nemechek (1993)
- Jimmy Hensley (1993)
- Sterling Marlin (1994–97)
- Bobby Hamilton (1998–2000)
- Robby Gordon (2001)
- Kevin Lepage (2001, 2003–2004, 2010 Bristol August, but DNQ)
- Bobby Hamilton Jr. (2001)
- Mike Skinner (Full-Time in 2002, first 14 starts in 2003 last start at Pocono in June and last attempt with DNQ at Michigan in June)
- Johnny Miller (2003; road races only)
- Stacy Compton (2003)
- Johnny Sauter (2003)
- Brett Bodine (2003; DNQ at Pocono & Indianapolis)
- P. J. Jones (2003 Watkins Glen; 2005 road races; 2006 Sonoma)
- Jimmy Spencer (2004)
- Eric McClure (2004, 2006, 2009 Talladega April, but DNQ)
- Mike Wallace (2004–05)
- John Andretti (2005 Michigan in August)
- Todd Bodine (2005–07)
- Scott Wimmer (2006; 2009 Bristol August; Dover September; but DNQ)
- Ward Burton (2006–07)

== Motorsports career results ==
=== NASCAR Cup Series ===
(key) (Bold – Pole position awarded by qualifying time. Italics – Pole position earned by points standings or practice time. * – Most laps led.)

==== Car No. 4 results ====
NASCAR Cup Series results
Year	Driver	No.	Make	1	2	3	4	5	6	7	8	9	10	11	12	13	14	15	16	17	18	19	20	21	22	23	24	25	26	27	28	29	30	31	32	33	34	35	36	Owners	Pts
1983	Connie Saylor	4	Olds	DAY	RCH	CAR	ATL	DAR	NWS	MAR	TAL; 40	NSV	DOV	BRI	CLT	RSD	POC																							(Note: unknown)	
1983	Mark Martin	4	Olds															MCH; 27	DAY; 19	NSV	POC		MCH; 18	BRI	DAR; 17	RCH	DOV	MAR	NWS											(Note: unknown)	
1983	Mark Martin	4	Chevy																			TAL; 10								CLT; 33	CAR	ATL; DNQ	RSD							(Note: unknown)	
1984	Lennie Pond	4	Chevy	DAY; 13	RCH; 20	CAR; 25	ATL; 39																																		
1984	Tommy Ellis	4	Chevy					BRI; 28	NWS; 29	DAR; 23	MAR; 29	TAL; 13	NSV; 14	DOV	CLT; 14	RSD	POC	MCH; 38	DAY; 14	NSV; 11	POC; 34	TAL; 9	MCH; 36	BRI; 28	DAR; 19	RCH; 15	DOV; 34	MAR; 17	CLT; 33	NWS; 14											
1984	Joe Ruttman	4	Chevy																												CAR; 34	ATL; 35	RSD; 10								
1985	Joe Ruttman	4	Chevy	DAY; 17	RCH	CAR; 6	ATL; 26	BRI; 29	DAR; 11	NWS	MAR	TAL; 30	DOV	CLT; 7	RSD	POC; 35	MCH	DAY; 35	POC	TAL; 33	MCH	BRI; 13	DAR; 9	RCH	DOV; 33	MAR	NWS	CLT; 5	CAR; 40	ATL; 32	RSD										
1986	Rick Wilson	4	Olds	DAY; 7	RCH	CAR	ATL; 39	BRI; 12	DAR; 15	NWS	MAR						MCH; 8	DAY; 21	POC; 10	TAL; 11	GLN; 23	MCH; 40	BRI; 26	DAR; 28	RCH	DOV; 32	MAR	NWS	CLT; 29	CAR	ATL; 14	RSD; 40									
1986	Rick Wilson	4	Chevy									TAL; 8	DOV																												
1986	Lake Speed	4	Olds											CLT; 14	RSD	POC																									
1987	Rick Wilson	4	Olds	DAY; 37	CAR	RCH	ATL; 11	DAR; 34	NWS	BRI	MAR	TAL; 20	CLT; 30	DOV; 29	POC	RSD; 14	MCH; 30	DAY; 30	POC; 40	TAL; 16	GLN; 21	MCH; 12	BRI; 7	DAR; 28	RCH	DOV; 27	MAR	NWS	CLT; 30	CAR	RSD; 18	ATL; 27									
1988	Rick Wilson	4	Olds	DAY; 15	RCH; DNQ	CAR; 36	ATL; 10	DAR; 27	**BRI**; 25	NWS; 28	MAR; 25	TAL; 35	CLT; 18*	DOV; 7	RSD; 33	POC; 25	MCH; 41	DAY; 2	POC; 13	TAL; 4	GLN; 12	MCH; 9	BRI; 23	DAR; 38	RCH; 33	DOV; 24	MAR; 16	CLT; 25	NWS; 20	CAR; 22	PHO; 29	ATL; 17									
1989	Rick Wilson	4	Olds	DAY; 8	CAR; 17	ATL; 6	RCH; 17	DAR; 11	BRI; 21	NWS; 30	MAR; 4	TAL; 15	CLT; 35	DOV; 14	SON; 8	POC; 27	MCH; 6	DAY; 29	POC; 25	TAL; 5	GLN; 8	MCH; 32	BRI; 27	DAR; 11	RCH; 22	DOV; 19	MAR; 18	CLT; 41	NWS; 29	CAR; 13	PHO; 40	ATL; 18									
1990	Phil Parsons	4	Olds	DAY; 42	RCH; 26	CAR; 14																																		8th	3617
1990	Ernie Irvan	4	Olds				ATL; 3	DAR; 32	**BRI**; 16	NWS; 16	MAR; 15	TAL; 4	CLT; 5	DOV; 7	SON; 7	**POC**; 17	MCH; 2	DAY; 33	POC; 26								MAR; 11	NWS; 6												8th	3617
1990	Ernie Irvan	4	Chevy																	TAL; 6	GLN; 28	MCH; 35	BRI; 1	DAR; 2	**RCH**; 12	DOV; 26			CLT; 27	CAR; 9	PHO; 9	ATL; 7								8th	3617
1991	Ernie Irvan	4	Chevy	DAY; 1	RCH; 27	CAR; 6	ATL; 14	DAR; 7	BRI; 2	NWS; 10	MAR; 15	**TAL**; 32	CLT; 7	DOV; 4	SON; 4	POC; 6	MCH; 5	DAY; 5*	POC; 7*	TAL; 33	GLN; 1*	MCH; 7	BRI; 18	DAR; 2	RCH; 4	DOV; 28	MAR; 4	NWS; 33	CLT; 30	CAR; 31	PHO; 6	ATL; 2									
1992	Ernie Irvan	4	Chevy	DAY; 28	CAR; 11	RCH; 15	ATL; 25	DAR; 26	BRI; 24	NWS; 13	MAR; 25	**TAL**; 5	CLT; 2	DOV; 4	SON; 1	POC; 19	MCH; 30	DAY; 1*	POC; 37	TAL; 1	GLN; 3*	MCH; 4	**BRI**; 28	DAR; 25	**RCH**; 11	DOV; 11	MAR; 27	NWS; 6	CLT; 6	CAR; 2	PHO; 34	ATL; 29									
1993	Ernie Irvan	4	Chevy	DAY; 37	CAR; 3	RCH; 11	ATL; 2	DAR; 22	BRI; 23	NWS; 11	MAR; 32	TAL; 1	SON; 2	CLT; 5	**DOV**; 32	POC; 34	MCH; 3	**DAY**; 7	NHA; 15	POC; 31	TAL; 2	GLN; 15	MCH; 32	BRI; 26																	
1993	Jeff Purvis	4	Chevy																						DAR; 26	RCH; 16	DOV; 13	MAR; 17	NWS; 25												
1993	Joe Nemechek	4	Chevy																											CLT; 25	CAR; 23										
1993	Jimmy Hensley	4	Chevy																													PHO; 32	ATL; 25								
1994	Sterling Marlin	4	Chevy	DAY; 1	CAR; 2	RCH; 19	ATL; 25	DAR; 34	BRI; 8	NWS; 17	MAR; 27	TAL; 8	SON; 29	CLT; 15	DOV; 8	POC; 38	MCH; 34	DAY; 28	NHA; 10	POC; 12	TAL; 5	IND; 14	GLN; 26	MCH; 34	BRI; 6	DAR; 5	RCH; 13	DOV; 30	MAR; 7	NWS; 31	CLT; 36	CAR; 14	**PHO**; 3	ATL; 40						15th	3443
1995	Sterling Marlin	4	Chevy	DAY; 1*	CAR; 12	RCH; 5	ATL; 7	DAR; 1	BRI; 9	NWS; 7	MAR; 13	TAL; 39	SON; 7	CLT; 4	DOV; 7	POC; 4	MCH; 7	DAY; 2*	NHA; 9	POC; 18	**TAL**; 1	IND; 7	GLN; 21	MCH; 4	BRI; 7	DAR; 10	RCH; 33	DOV; 6	MAR; 23	NWS; 15	CLT; 6	CAR; 6	PHO; 12	ATL; 2						3rd	4361
1996	Sterling Marlin	4	Chevy	DAY; 40	CAR; 6	RCH; 11	ATL; 13	DAR; 11	BRI; 18	NWS; 5	MAR; 10	TAL; 1*	SON; 15	CLT; 6	DOV; 41	POC; 11	MCH; 3*	DAY; 1*	NHA; 29	POC; 6	TAL; 29	IND; 39	GLN; 11	MCH; 33	BRI; 18	DAR; 8	RCH; 21	DOV; 17	MAR; 31	NWS; 11	CLT; 4	CAR; 13	PHO; 27	ATL; 15						8th	3682
1997	Sterling Marlin	4	Chevy	DAY; 5	CAR; 20	RCH; 19	ATL; 23	DAR; 32	TEX; 8	BRI; 20	MAR; 21	SON; 26	TAL; 39	CLT; 40	DOV; 10	POC; 15	MCH; 17	CAL; 36	DAY; 3	NHA; 22	POC; 20	IND; 43	GLN; 13	MCH; 43	BRI; 10	DAR; 40	RCH; 39	NHA; 39	DOV; 27	MAR; 39	CLT; 20	TAL; 38	CAR; 9	PHO; 27	ATL; 11					25th	2954
1998	Bobby Hamilton	4	Chevy	DAY; 12	CAR; 9	LVS; 20	ATL; 21	DAR; 35	BRI; 18	TEX; 26	**MAR**; 1*	TAL; 30	CAL; 27	CLT; 20	DOV; 17	RCH; 16	MCH; 38	POC; 20	SON; 2	NHA; 15	POC; 20	IND; 20	GLN; 13	MCH; 20	BRI; 11	NHA; 34	DAR; 23	RCH; 6	DOV; 10	MAR; 14	CLT; 4	TAL; 15	DAY; 21	PHO; 21	CAR; 6	ATL; 6				10th	3786
1999	Bobby Hamilton	4	Chevy	DAY; 29	CAR; 9	LVS; 24	ATL; 12	DAR; 7	TEX; 29	BRI; 18	MAR; 33	TAL; 31	CAL; 30	RCH; 4	CLT; 13	DOV; 21	MCH; 31	POC; 10	SON; 11	DAY; 8	NHA; 16	POC; 17	IND; 38	GLN; 22	MCH; 35	BRI; 41	DAR; 7	RCH; 7	NHA; 11	DOV; 30	MAR; 30	CLT; 22	TAL; 9	CAR; 10	PHO; 23	HOM; 25	ATL; 10			13th	3564
2000	Bobby Hamilton	4	Chevy	DAY; 43	CAR; 40	LVS; 34	ATL; 13	DAR; 7	BRI; 15	TEX; 16	MAR; 18	TAL; 43	CAL; 18	RCH; 31	CLT; 34	DOV; 27	MCH; 43	POC; 40	SON; 16	DAY; 36	NHA; 22	POC; 39	IND; 40	GLN; 16	MCH; 14	BRI; 34	DAR; 22	RCH; 38	NHA; 35	DOV; 25	MAR; 35	CLT; 34	TAL; 36	CAR; 9	PHO; 43	HOM; 31	ATL; 16			32nd	2715
2001	Robby Gordon	4	Chevy	DAY; 37	CAR; 26	LVS; 34	ATL; 20	DAR; 29																																37th	2759
2001	Kevin Lepage	4	Chevy						BRI; 15	TEX; 11	MAR; 18	TAL; 42	CAL; DNQ	RCH; 27	CLT; 35	DOV; 24	MCH; 31	POC; 21	SON; 43	DAY; 31	CHI; 34	NHA; 30	POC; 42	IND; DNQ	GLN; 33	MCH; 38	BRI; 13	DAR; 28	RCH; 39	DOV; 16	KAN; 13									37th	2759
2001	Bobby Hamilton Jr.	4	Chevy																													CLT; 33		TAL; 14	PHO; 38	CAR; 17	HOM; 35	ATL; 15	NHA; 37	37th	2759
2001	Rich Bickle	4	Chevy																														MAR; 31							37th	2759
2002	Mike Skinner	4	Chevy	DAY; 23	CAR; 36	LVS; 34	ATL; 28	DAR; 20	BRI; 23	TEX; 12	MAR; 25	TAL; 23	CAL; 31	RCH; 28	CLT; 24	DOV; 22	POC; 37	MCH; 30	SON; 12	DAY; 37	CHI; 23	NHA; 38	POC; 29	IND; 36	GLN; 40	MCH; 28	BRI; 29	DAR; 38	RCH; 22	NHA; 43	DOV; 19	KAN; 32	TAL; 28	CLT; 24	MAR; 33	ATL; 26	CAR; 6	PHO; 24	HOM; 36	35th	2886
2003	Mike Skinner	4	Pontiac	DAY; 37	CAR; 17	LVS; 39	ATL; 30	DAR; 11	BRI; 41	TEX; 40	TAL; 31	MAR; 35	CAL; 20	RCH; 35	CLT; 20	DOV; 36	POC; 34	MCH; DNQ																						40th	2483
2003	Johnny Miller	4	Pontiac																SON; 24																					40th	2483
2003	Stacy Compton	4	Pontiac																	DAY; 33						MCH; DNQ														40th	2483
2003	Johnny Sauter	4	Pontiac																		CHI; 35	NHA; 23					BRI; 25		RCH; 28	NHA; 32			KAN; DNQ							40th	2483
2003	Brett Bodine	4	Pontiac																				POC; DNQ																	40th	2483
2003	Robert Pressley	4	Pontiac																					IND; DNQ																40th	2483
2003	P. J. Jones	4	Pontiac																						GLN; 24															40th	2483
2003	Kevin Lepage	4	Pontiac																									DAR; 15			DOV; 27	TAL; DNQ		CLT; 21	MAR; 35	ATL; 14	PHO; 23	CAR; 42	HOM; 18	40th	2483
2004	Kevin Lepage	4	Chevy	DAY; 32	CAR; 22	LVS; 36	ATL; 36	DAR; 28	BRI; 30																															36th	2509
2004	Jimmy Spencer	4	Chevy							TEX; 29	MAR; 38	TAL; 20	CAL; 38	RCH; 41	CLT; 29	DOV; 17	POC; 23	MCH; 28	SON	DAY; 29	CHI; 25	NHA; 23	POC; 23	IND; 19	GLN; 42	MCH; 31	BRI; 31	CAL; 32	RCH; 33	NHA; 38	DOV; 26	TAL; 40	KAN; 25	CLT; 29	MAR; 35					36th	2509
2004	Mike Wallace	4	Chevy																																	ATL; DNQ	PHO; 29	DAR; 38	HOM; 33	36th	2509
2005	Mike Wallace	4	Chevy	DAY; 41	CAL; 25	LVS; 24	ATL; 40	BRI; 34	MAR; 23	TEX; 25	PHO; 27	TAL; 28	DAR; 24	RCH; 29	CLT; 16	DOV; 28	POC; 31	MCH; 43	SON; QL^{†}	DAY; 8	CHI; 25	NHA; 38	POC; 29	IND; DNQ			BRI; 17		RCH; 14	NHA; 22	DOV; 22	TAL; 19	KAN; 35	CLT; 43	MAR; 35	ATL; DNQ	TEX; 36	PHO; DNQ		36th	2640
2005	P. J. Jones	4	Chevy																SON; 32						GLN; 42															36th	2640
2005	John Andretti	4	Chevy																							MCH; 28		CAL; DNQ												36th	2640
2005	Todd Bodine	4	Chevy																																				HOM; 20	36th	2640
2006	Scott Wimmer	4	Chevy	DAY; DNQ	CAL; 39	LVS; 32	ATL; 30	BRI; 19	MAR; 28	TEX; 28	PHO; 30	TAL; 21	RCH; 36	DAR; 33	CLT; 27	DOV; 34	POC; DNQ	MCH; 31		DAY; DNQ	CHI; 34	NHA; 20	POC; 38	IND; 20	GLN; 25	MCH; DNQ	BRI; 42	CAL; 30	RCH; 29	NHA; 31	DOV; 36	KAN; DNQ								39th	2340
2006	P. J. Jones	4	Chevy																SON; 36																					39th	2340
2006	Todd Bodine	4	Chevy																														TAL; DNQ	CLT; 19		ATL; 42				39th	2340
2006	Ward Burton	4	Chevy																																MAR; 26		TEX; 25	PHO; 28	HOM; DNQ	39th	2340
2007	Ward Burton	4	Chevy	DAY; DNQ	CAL; DNQ	LVS; 43	ATL; DNQ	BRI; 18	MAR; DNQ	TEX; DNQ	PHO; 36	TAL; 36	RCH; 35	DAR; DNQ	CLT; DNQ	DOV; 41	POC; 33	MCH; DNQ	SON; DNQ	NHA; 43	DAY; DNQ	CHI; 41	IND; 14	POC; 43	GLN; DNQ	MCH; 20	BRI; 33	CAL; DNQ	RCH; DNQ	NHA; 41	DOV; DNQ	KAN; DNQ	TAL; DNQ	CLT; 43	MAR; 38	ATL; DNQ	TEX; DNQ	PHO; DNQ		46th	1531
2007	Todd Bodine	4	Chevy																																				HOM; DNQ	46th	1531
2009	Eric McClure	4	Chevy	DAY	CAL	LVS	ATL	BRI	MAR	TEX	PHO	TAL; DNQ	RCH	DAR	CLT	DOV	POC	MCH	SON	NHA	DAY	CHI	IND	POC	GLN	MCH														55th	135
2009	Scott Wimmer	4	Chevy																								BRI; 29	ATL	RCH	NHA	DOV; DNQ	KAN	CAL	CLT	MAR	TAL	TEX	PHO	HOM	55th	135
2010	Kevin Lepage	4	Chevy	DAY	CAL	LVS	ATL	BRI	MAR	PHO	TEX	TAL	RCH	DAR	DOV	CLT	POC	MCH	SON	NHA	DAY	CHI	IND	POC	GLN	MCH	BRI; DNQ	ATL	RCH	NHA	DOV	KAN	CAL	CLT	MAR	TAL	TEX	PHO	HOM	61st	25

==== Car No. 04 results ====
NASCAR Sprint Cup Series results
Year	Driver	No.	Make	1	2	3	4	5	6	7	8	9	10	11	12	13	14	15	16	17	18	19	20	21	22	23	24	25	26	27	28	29	30	31	32	33	34	35	36	Owners	Pts
2003	David Reutimann	04	Pontiac	DAY	CAR	LVS	ATL	DAR	BRI	TEX	TAL	MAR	CAL	RCH	CLT	DOV	POC	MCH	SON	DAY	CHI	NHA; DNQ	POC	IND; DNQ																62nd	93
2003	Johnny Miller	04	Pontiac																						GLN; 36	MCH	BRI	DAR	RCH	NHA	DOV	TAL	KAN	CLT	MAR	ATL	PHO	CAR	HOM	62nd	93
2004	Eric McClure	04	Chevy	DAY	CAR	LVS	ATL	DAR	BRI	TEX	MAR	TAL; 26	CAL	RCH	CLT	DOV	POC	MCH	SON	DAY; DNQ	CHI	NHA	POC	IND	GLN	MCH	BRI	CAL	RCH	NHA	DOV	TAL	KAN	CLT	MAR	ATL	PHO	DAR	HOM	66th	112
2006	Eric McClure	04	Chevy	DAY	CAL	LVS	ATL	BRI	MAR	TEX	PHO	TAL	RCH	DAR	CLT	DOV	POC	MCH	SON	DAY	CHI	NHA	POC	IND	GLN	MCH	BRI	CAL	RCH	NHA	DOV	KAN	TAL; 31	CLT	MAR	ATL	TEX	PHO	HOM	64th	70
2007	Eric McClure	04	Chevy	DAY; DNQ	CAL	LVS	ATL	BRI	MAR	TEX	PHO	TAL	RCH	DAR	CLT	DOV	POC	MCH	SON	NHA	DAY; DNQ	CHI	IND	POC	GLN	MCH	BRI	CAL	RCH	NHA	DOV	KAN	TAL	CLT	MAR	ATL	TEX	PHO	HOM	68th	8

Footnotes
