= 2007 Nextel All-Star Challenge =

23rd iteration of the NASCAR All-Star Race

The 2007 Nextel Open and Nextel All-Star Challenge was a professional auto race held on May 19, 2007, at Lowe's Motor Speedway in Concord, North Carolina. North Carolina native and former NBA MVP Michael Jordan was the grand marshal of the event.

== Race and qualifying format ==
=== All-Star Challenge ===
NASCAR's All-Star Challenge is an exhibition race which uses a different format. Similarly to the All-Star games in other North American sports leagues, it does not affect the championship standings. Race winners (either drivers or teams) in the 2006 and the first eleven races of the 2007 seasons, plus former Winston/Nextel Cup Champions and All-Star event winners from the past decade, automatically qualify for the main event. On restarts of the race after caution flags, the cars line up in a double file restart, akin to the start of a regulation race. A description of how the race was reformatted for the 2007 running can be found here.

Qualifying for this event is different from qualifying in NASCAR. Those entered for the main event take 3 timed qualifying laps, instead of the usual two laps used in all sanctioned oval races, but they must take a required pit stop for four tires after either the first or second lap, coming in at the pit road speed (in the case of LMS, 45 miles per hour), with no speed limit on exits. Infractions will also incur time penalties. Starting in 2007, the selection of the pit boxes used by teams was made after the annual Pit Crew Challenge event to be held three days earlier at Charlotte Bobcats Arena, won by the Ryan Newman No. 12 team. In the qualifying, Matt Kenseth won the pole. Kevin Harvick was bumper-to-bumper with Jimmie Johnson coming to the start/finish line to win the race.

=== Nextel Open ===
All other drivers or teams that are in the Nextel Cup Top 50 owners or drivers points that do not automatically qualify for the All-Star Challenge are entered into a 40-lap, a two-half event called the Nextel Open. Only the top two drivers, plus one additional driver on the lead lap that is voted in by fans on the World Wide Web via Sprint/Nextel's website, their customers, and attendees of the race, join the elite field. Standard qualifying rules applied for those in this event, which saw Carl Edwards win "P-1" (a.k.a. the pole position), edging fellow Roush-Fenway teammate David Ragan. The Nextel Open was won by Martin Truex Jr. Johnny Sauter finished second.

=== Kobalt Tools Crew Chief Race ===
Before the All-Star Challenge, a new preliminary race was held between Nextel Cup crew chiefs—the Kobalt Tools Crew Chief Race. The race comprised eighteen crew chiefs driving small Legends Thunder Roadster cars on the quarter-mile oval in front of the main track's grandstand and was televised in the United States on Speed. NASCAR on ESPN color commentator and former crew chief, Andy Petree won the main event, earning a $10,000 donation for any charity of his choice. The charities he decided to donate the race winnings to were Motor Racing Outreach and Mud Creek Baptist Church.

== List of 2007 qualifiers ==
The following drivers qualified after they won at least one race in the 2006 or 2007 seasons, in order of their qualifying win:

- Jimmie Johnson - 2006 Daytona 500
- Matt Kenseth - 2006 Auto Club 500
- Kasey Kahne - 2006 Golden Corral 500
- Kurt Busch - 2006 Food City 500
- Tony Stewart - 2006 DirecTV 500
- Kevin Harvick - 2006 Subway Fresh 500
- Dale Earnhardt Jr. - 2006 Crown Royal 400
- Greg Biffle - 2006 Dodge Charger 500
- Denny Hamlin - 2006 Pocono 500
- Jeff Gordon - 2006 Dodge/Save Mart 350
- Kyle Busch - 2006 Lenox Industrial Tools 300
- Jeff Burton - 2006 Dover 400
- Brian Vickers - 2006 UAW-Ford 500 (drove the No. 25 Hendrick Motorsports car)

The following drivers qualified as a result of driving a car that won a race in 2006 with a different driver:

- Casey Mears - No. 25 car won the 2006 UAW-Ford 500

The following drivers qualified as a result of being a former Nextel Cup champion (since 1997):

- Jeff Gordon (1997, 1998 and 2001 Champion, already qualified)
- Dale Jarrett (1999 Champion)
- Bobby Labonte (2000 Champion)
- Tony Stewart (2002 and 2005 Champion, already qualified)
- Matt Kenseth (2003 Champion, already qualified)
- Kurt Busch (2004 Champion, already qualified)
- Jimmie Johnson (2006 Champion, already qualified)

The following drivers qualified as a result of being a former winner of the Nextel All-Star Challenge (since 1997):

- Jeff Gordon (1997 and 2001 winner, already qualified)
- Mark Martin (1998 and 2005 winner, already qualified)
- The 1999 winner was Terry Labonte, who retired after the 2006 season and did not compete
- Dale Earnhardt Jr. (2000 winner, already qualified)
- Ryan Newman (2002 winner)
- Jimmie Johnson (2003 and 2006 winner, already qualified)
- Matt Kenseth (2004 winner, already qualified)

The following drivers qualified via the Nextel Open:

- Martin Truex Jr. (won the Nextel Open)
- Johnny Sauter (finished 2nd in the Nextel Open)

Also qualifying, the 2007 Fan Vote Winner:

- Kenny Wallace

== Entry list ==
=== The Open ===
- (R) = Rookie

#	Driver	Team	Make
00	David Reutimann (R)	Michael Waltrip Racing	Toyota
1	Martin Truex Jr.	Dale Earnhardt Inc.	Chevrolet
4	Ward Burton	Morgan-McClure Motorsports	Chevrolet
6	David Ragan (R)	Roush Fenway Racing	Ford
07	Clint Bowyer	Richard Childress Racing	Chevrolet
7	Robby Gordon	Robby Gordon Motorsports	Ford
10	Scott Riggs	Gillett Evernham Motorsports	Dodge
13	Joe Nemechek	Ginn Racing	Chevrolet
14	Sterling Marlin	Ginn Racing	Chevrolet
15	Paul Menard (R)	Dale Earnhardt Inc.	Chevrolet
18	J. J. Yeley	Joe Gibbs Racing	Chevrolet
19	Elliott Sadler	Gillett Evernham Motorsports	Dodge
21	Jon Wood (R)	Wood Brothers Racing	Ford
22	Dave Blaney	Bill Davis Racing	Toyota
26	Jamie McMurray	Roush Fenway Racing	Ford
34	Kevin Lepage	Front Row Motorsports	Dodge
36	Jeremy Mayfield	Bill Davis Racing	Toyota
37	Boris Said	Front Row Motorsports	Dodge
38	David Gilliland (R)	Robert Yates Racing	Ford
40	David Stremme	Chip Ganassi Racing	Dodge
41	Reed Sorenson	Chip Ganassi Racing	Dodge
42	Juan Pablo Montoya	Chip Ganassi Racing	Dodge
45	Kyle Petty	Petty Enterprises	Dodge
49	Mike Bliss	BAM Racing	Dodge
55	Michael Waltrip	Michael Waltrip Racing	Toyota
66	Jeff Green	Haas CNC Racing	Chevrolet
70	Johnny Sauter	Haas CNC Racing	Chevrolet
78	Kenny Wallace	Furniture Row Racing	Chevrolet
84	A. J. Allmendinger (R)	Red Bull Racing Team	Toyota
88	Ricky Rudd	Robert Yates Racing	Ford
96	Tony Raines	Hall of Fame Racing	Chevrolet
99	Carl Edwards	Roush Fenway Racing	Ford

=== All-Star Challenge ===
#	Driver	Team	Make
01	Mark Martin	Ginn Racing	Chevrolet
2	Kurt Busch	Penske Racing South	Dodge
5	Kyle Busch	Hendrick Motorsports	Chevrolet
8	Dale Earnhardt Jr.	Dale Earnhardt Inc.	Chevrolet
9	Kasey Kahne	Gillett Evernham Motorsports	Dodge
11	Denny Hamlin	Joe Gibbs Racing	Chevrolet
12	Ryan Newman	Penske Racing South	Dodge
16	Greg Biffle	Roush Fenway Racing	Ford
17	Matt Kenseth	Roush Fenway Racing	Ford
20	Tony Stewart	Joe Gibbs Racing	Chevrolet
24	Jeff Gordon	Hendrick Motorsports	Chevrolet
25	Casey Mears	Hendrick Motorsports	Chevrolet
29	Kevin Harvick	Richard Childress Racing	Chevrolet
31	Jeff Burton	Richard Childress Racing	Chevrolet
43	Bobby Labonte	Petty Enterprises	Dodge
44	Dale Jarrett	Michael Waltrip Racing	Toyota
48	Jimmie Johnson	Hendrick Motorsports	Chevrolet
83	Brian Vickers	Red Bull Racing Team	Toyota

== Qualifying ==
=== The Open ===
Pos.	#	Driver	Team	Make
1	99	Carl Edwards	Roush Fenway Racing	Ford
2	6	David Ragan (R)	Roush Fenway Racing	Ford
3	22	Dave Blaney	Bill Davis Racing	Toyota
4	38	David Gilliland (R)	Robert Yates Racing	Ford
5	42	Juan Pablo Montoya (R)	Chip Ganassi Racing	Dodge
6	26	Jamie McMurray	Roush Fenway Racing	Ford
7	41	Reed Sorenson	Chip Ganassi Racing	Dodge
8	84	A. J. Allmendinger (R)	Red Bull Racing	Toyota
9	88	Ricky Rudd	Robert Yates Racing	Ford
10	15	Paul Menard (R)	Dale Earnhardt Inc.	Chevrolet
11	1	Martin Truex Jr.	Dale Earnhardt Inc.	Chevrolet
12	10	Scott Riggs	Gillett Evernham Motorsports	Dodge
13	14	Sterling Marlin	Ginn Racing	Chevrolet
14	13	Joe Nemechek	Ginn Racing	Chevrolet
15	66	Jeff Green	Haas CNC Racing	Chevrolet
16	49	Mike Bliss	BAM Racing	Dodge
17	96	Tony Raines	Hall of Fame Racing	Chevrolet
18	21	Jon Wood (R)	Wood Brothers Racing	Ford
19	4	Ward Burton	Morgan-McClure Racing	Chevrolet
20	70	Johnny Sauter	Haas CNC Racing	Chevrolet
21	78	Kenny Wallace	Furniture Row Racing	Chevrolet
22	07	Clint Bowyer	Richard Childress Racing	Chevrolet
23	19	Elliott Sadler	Gillett Evernham Motorsports	Dodge
24	18	J. J. Yeley	Joe Gibbs Racing	Chevrolet
25	7	Robby Gordon	Robby Gordon Motorsports	Ford
26	36	Jeremy Mayfield	Bill Davis Racing	Toyota
27	45	Kyle Petty	Petty Enterprises	Dodge
28	00	David Reutimann (R)	Michael Waltrip Racing	Toyota
29	34	Kevin Lepage	Front Row Motorsports	Dodge
30	37	Boris Said	Front Row Motorsports	Dodge
31	40	David Stremme	Chip Ganassi Racing	Dodge
32	55	Michael Waltrip	Michael Waltrip Racing	Toyota

=== All-Star Challenge ===
Pos.	#	Driver	Team	Make
1	17	Matt Kenseth	Roush Fenway Racing	Ford
2	48	Jimmie Johnson	Hendrick Motorsports	Chevrolet
3	2	Kurt Busch	Penske Racing South	Dodge
4	29	Kevin Harvick	Richard Childress Racing	Chevrolet
5	31	Jeff Burton	Richard Childress Racing	Chevrolet
6	5	Kyle Busch	Hendrick Motorsports	Chevrolet
7	24	Jeff Gordon	Hendrick Motorsports	Chevrolet
8	12	Ryan Newman	Penske Racing South	Dodge
9	11	Denny Hamlin	Joe Gibbs Racing	Chevrolet
10	8	Dale Earnhardt Jr.	Dale Earnhardt Inc.	Chevrolet
11	9	Kasey Kahne	Gillet Evernham Motorsports	Dodge
12	16	Greg Biffle	Roush Fenway Racing	Ford
13	44	Dale Jarrett	Michael Waltrip Racing	Toyota
14	83	Brian Vickers	Red Bull Racing	Toyota
15	43	Bobby Labonte	Petty Enterprises	Dodge
16	25	Casey Mears	Hendrick Motorsports	Chevrolet
17	20	Tony Stewart	Joe Gibbs Racing	Chevrolet
18	01	Mark Martin	Ginn Racing	Chevrolet
19	1	Martin Truex Jr.*	Dale Earnhardt Inc.	Chevrolet
20	70	Johnny Sauter**	Haas CNC Racing	Chevrolet
21	78	Kenny Wallace***	Furniture Row Racing	Chevrolet

* - Won the Showdown

** - Showdown runner up

*** - Fan Vote winner

== The Open ==
Martin Truex Jr. won the Nextel Open, which was the first win for Truex of any kind in a Nextel Cup race. Johnny Sauter edged out Carl Edwards for the second transfer spot in this race.

The 40-lap race was stopped four times due to caution, including a 10-car incident halfway through lap 1 in which, among other things, the hoods of the cars driven by David Gilliland and Juan Pablo Montoya collided.

Kenny Wallace won the fan vote, partly due to a large Get out the vote campaign mounted by Speed Channel, where he worked as an analyst.

== The Challenge ==
Kevin Harvick passed Jeff Burton at the start of the fourth and final segment and won the event for the first time in his career. Harvick won $1,031,539, which at the time was the largest amount awarded to an all-star race winner. Jimmie Johnson finished second, and Mark Martin finished third.

Burton had inherited the lead from Matt Kenseth, who was sent to the tail end of the longest line due to speeding on pit road during the break between segments three and four. During this break, teams had to visit the pits at least once, but no service was required. Kenseth decided on the visit and also won the first segment. Kyle Busch was first at the end of the second segment.

It was the fourth win for Richard Childress Racing after three wins by Dale Earnhardt.

This race was also notable for a crash between brothers Kurt Busch and Kyle Busch. They touched entering turn 1 with 18 laps to go, sending both into the wall rear-first. In an interview after the incident, Kurt Busch joked that he would not "be eating Kellogg's anytime soon," referring to Kyle Busch's sponsor.

== Results ==
=== The Open ===
Pos.	#	Driver	Team	Make	Laps	Led	Status
1	1	Marin Truex Jr.	Dale Earnhardt Inc.	Chevrolet	40	3	running
2	70	Johnny Sauter	Haas CNC Racing	Chevrolet	40	0	running
3	99	Carl Edwards	Roush Fenway Racing	Ford	40	37	running
4	22	Dave Blaney	Bill Davis Racing	Toyota	40	0	running
5	88	Ricky Rudd	Robert Yates Racing	Ford	40	0	running
6	07	Clint Bowyer	Richard Childress Racing	Chevrolet	40	0	running
7	14	Sterling Marlin	Ginn Racing	Chevrolet	40	0	running
8	36	Jeremy Mayfield	Bill Davis Racing	Toyota	40	0	running
9	96	Tony Raines	Hall of Fame Racing	Chevrolet	40	0	running
10	26	Jamie McMurray	Roush Fenway Racing	Ford	40	0	running
11	40	David Stremme	Chip Ganassi Racing	Dodge	40	0	running
12	66	Jeff Green	Haas CNC Racing	Chevrolet	40	0	running
13	18	J. J. Yeley	Joe Gibbs Racing	Chevrolet	40	0	running
14	45	Kyle Petty	Petty Enterprises	Dodge	40	0	running
15	84	A. J. Allmendinger (R)	Red Bull Racing	Toyota	40	0	running
16	7	Robby Gordon	Robby Gordon Motorsports	Ford	40	0	running
17	4	Ward Burton	Morgan-McClure Motorsports	Chevrolet	40	0	running
18	78	Kenny Wallace	Furniture Row Racing	Chevrolet	40	0	running
19	34	Kevin Lepage	Front Row Motorsports	Dodge	40	0	running
20	55	Michael Waltrip	Michael Waltrip Racing	Toyota	38	0	running
21	00	David Reutimann (R)	Michael Waltrip Racing	Toyota	33	0	electrical
22	6	David Ragan (R)	Roush Fenway Racing	Ford	20	0	crash
23	41	Reed Sorenson	Chip Ganassi Racing	Dodge	20	0	crash
24	19	Elliott Sadler	Gillett Evernham Motorsports	Dodge	20	0	crash
25	49	Mike Bliss	BAM Racing	Dodge	9	0	crash
26	37	Boris Said	Front Row Motorsports	Dodge	9	0	crash
27	10	Scott Riggs	Gillett Evernham Motorsports	Dodge	1	0	crash
28	38	David Gilliland (R)	Robert Yates Racing	Ford	0	0	crash
29	42	Juan Pablo Montoya (R)	Chip Ganassi Racing	Dodge	0	0	crash
30	15	Paul Menard (R)	Dale Earnhardt Inc.	Chevrolet	0	0	crash
31	13	Joe Nemechek	Ginn Racing	Chevrolet	0	0	crash
32	21	Jon Wood (R)	Wood Brothers Racing	Ford	0	0	crash

=== All-Star Challenge ===
Pos.	#	Driver	Team	Make	Laps	Led	Status
1	29	Kevin Harvick	Richard Childress Racing	Chevrolet	80	20	running
2	48	Jimmie Johnson	Hendrick Motorsports	Chevrolet	80	0	running
3	01	Mark Martin	Ginn Racing	Chevrolet	80	0	running
4	31	Jeff Burton	Richard Childress Racing	Chevrolet	80	0	running
5	20	Tony Stewart	Joe Gibbs Racing	Chevrolet	80	0	running
6	70	Johnny Sauter	Haas CNC Racing	Chevrolet	80	0	running
7	17	Matt Kenseth	Roush Fenway Racing	Ford	80	36	running
8	12	Ryan Newman	Penske Racing South	Dodge	80	0	running
9	8	Dale Earnhardt Jr.	Dale Earnhardt Inc.	Chevrolet	80	0	running
10	1	Martin Truex Jr.	Dale Earnhardt Inc.	Chevrolet	80	0	running
11	24	Jeff Gordon	Hendrick Motorsports	Chevrolet	80	0	running
12	44	Dale Jarrett	Michael Waltrip Racing	Toyota	80	0	running
13	83	Brian Vickers	Red Bull Racing	Toyota	80	0	running
14	9	Kasey Kahne	Gillett Evernham Motorsports	Dodge	80	0	running
15	16	Greg Biffle	Roush Fenway Racing	Ford	80	0	running
16	78	Kenny Wallace	Furniture Row Racing	Chevrolet	80	0	running
17	11	Denny Hamlin	Joe Gibbs Racing	Chevrolet	63	0	crash
18	25	Casey Mears	Hendrick Motorsports	Chevrolet	63	0	crash
19	2	Kurt Busch	Penske Racing South	Dodge	62	0	crash
20	5	Kyle Busch	Hendrick Motorsports	Chevrolet	62	0	crash
21	43	Bobby Labonte	Petty Enterprises	Dodge	41	0	crash
