= 2007 Kobalt Tools 500 =

Fourth race of the 2007 NASCAR Nextel Cup Series

Race details
- Race 4 of 36 in the 2007 NASCAR Nextel Cup Series
- The 2007 Kobalt Tools 500 program cover.
- Date: March 18, 2007
- Official name: 48th Annual Kobalt Tools 500
- Location: Hampton, Georgia, Atlanta Motor Speedway
- Course: Permanent racing facility
- Course length: 1.54 miles (2.48 km)
- Distance: 325 laps, 500.5 mi (805.476 km)
- Average speed: 152.915 miles per hour (246.093 km/h)
- Attendance: 105,000

Pole position
Driver	Ryan Newman	Penske Racing South
- Time: 28.707

Most laps led
Driver	Jimmie Johnson	Hendrick Motorsports
- Laps: 135

Winner
No. 48	Jimmie Johnson	Hendrick Motorsports

Television in the United States
- Network: FOX
- Announcers: Mike Joy, Larry McReynolds, Darrell Waltrip

Radio in the United States
- Radio: Performance Racing Network

The 2007 Kobalt Tools 500 was the fourth stock car race of the 2007 NASCAR Nextel Cup Series and the 48th iteration of the event. The race was held on Sunday, March 18th, 2007, before an audience of 105,000 in Hampton, Georgia at Atlanta Motor Speedway, a 1.54 miles (2.48 km) permanent asphalt quad-oval intermediate speedway. The race took the scheduled 325 laps to complete. In the final laps of the race, Hendrick Motorsports driver Jimmie Johnson would make a late-race charge for the lead, completing a final pass for the lead with three laps left in the race to take his 25th career NASCAR Nextel Cup Series victory, his second victory of the season, and his second consecutive victory. To fill out the top three, Joe Gibbs Racing driver Tony Stewart and Roush Racing driver Matt Kenseth would finish second and third, respectively. This is also the final race to run the generation 4 NASCARs.

== Background ==
The layout of Atlanta Motor Speedway, the venue where the race was held.

Atlanta Motor Speedway (formerly Atlanta International Raceway) is a track in Hampton, Georgia, 20 miles (32 km) south of Atlanta. It is a 1.54-mile (2.48 km) quad-oval track with a seating capacity of 111,000. It opened in 1960 as a 1.5-mile (2.4 km) standard oval. In 1994, 46 condominiums were built over the northeastern side of the track. In 1997, to standardize the track with Speedway Motorsports' other two 1.5-mile (2.4 km) ovals, the entire track was almost completely rebuilt. The frontstretch and backstretch were swapped, and the configuration of the track was changed from oval to quad-oval. The project made the track one of the fastest on the NASCAR circuit.

=== Entry list ===
- (R) denotes rookie driver.

#	Driver	Team	Make	Sponsor
00	David Reutimann (R)	Michael Waltrip Racing	Toyota	Domino's
1	Martin Truex Jr.	Dale Earnhardt, Inc.	Chevrolet	Bass Pro Shops, Tracker Boats
01	Mark Martin	Ginn Racing	Chevrolet	U.S. Army
2	Kurt Busch	Penske Racing South	Dodge	Miller Lite
4	Ward Burton	Morgan–McClure Motorsports	Chevrolet	State Water Heaters
5	Kyle Busch	Hendrick Motorsports	Chevrolet	Kellogg's, Carquest
6	David Ragan (R)	Roush Racing	Ford	AAA
7	Robby Gordon	Robby Gordon Motorsports	Ford	Motorola
07	Clint Bowyer	Richard Childress Racing	Chevrolet	Jack Daniel's
8	Dale Earnhardt Jr.	Dale Earnhardt, Inc.	Chevrolet	Budweiser
9	Kasey Kahne	Evernham Motorsports	Dodge	Dodge
10	Scott Riggs	Evernham Motorsports	Dodge	Stanley Tools
11	Denny Hamlin	Joe Gibbs Racing	Chevrolet	FedEx Ground
12	Ryan Newman	Penske Racing South	Dodge	Alltel
13	Joe Nemechek	Ginn Racing	Chevrolet	Ginn Resorts
14	Sterling Marlin	Ginn Racing	Chevrolet	Panasonic
15	Paul Menard (R)	Dale Earnhardt, Inc.	Chevrolet	Menards, Quaker State
16	Greg Biffle	Roush Racing	Ford	Jackson Hewitt
17	Matt Kenseth	Roush Racing	Ford	DeWalt
18	J. J. Yeley	Joe Gibbs Racing	Chevrolet	Interstate Batteries
19	Elliott Sadler	Evernham Motorsports	Dodge	Dodge
20	Tony Stewart	Joe Gibbs Racing	Chevrolet	The Home Depot
21	Ken Schrader	Wood Brothers Racing	Ford	Little Debbie
22	Dave Blaney	Bill Davis Racing	Toyota	Caterpillar
24	Jeff Gordon	Hendrick Motorsports	Chevrolet	DuPont
25	Casey Mears	Hendrick Motorsports	Chevrolet	National Guard, GMAC
26	Jamie McMurray	Roush Racing	Ford	Crown Royal
29	Kevin Harvick	Richard Childress Racing	Chevrolet	Shell, Pennzoil
31	Jeff Burton	Richard Childress Racing	Chevrolet	Cingular Wireless
33	Scott Wimmer	Richard Childress Racing	Chevrolet	Camping World
34	Kevin Lepage	Front Row Motorsports	Dodge	Front Row Motorsports
36	Jeremy Mayfield	Bill Davis Racing	Toyota	360 OTC
37	John Andretti	Front Row Motorsports	Dodge	Huddle House
38	David Gilliland	Robert Yates Racing	Ford	M&M's
40	David Stremme	Chip Ganassi Racing	Dodge	Coors Light
41	Reed Sorenson	Chip Ganassi Racing	Dodge	Target
42	Juan Pablo Montoya (R)	Chip Ganassi Racing	Dodge	Texaco, Havoline
43	Bobby Labonte	Petty Enterprises	Dodge	Cheerios
44	Dale Jarrett	Michael Waltrip Racing	Toyota	UPS
45	Kyle Petty	Petty Enterprises	Dodge	National Tire and Battery
48	Jimmie Johnson	Hendrick Motorsports	Chevrolet	Lowe's
49	Mike Bliss	BAM Racing	Dodge	Zone Loans
55	Michael Waltrip	Michael Waltrip Racing	Toyota	NAPA Auto Parts
66	Jeff Green	Haas CNC Racing	Chevrolet	Yellow Transportation
70	Johnny Sauter	Haas CNC Racing	Chevrolet	Best Buy
78	Kenny Wallace	Furniture Row Racing	Chevrolet	Furniture Row
83	Brian Vickers	Red Bull Racing Team	Toyota	Red Bull
84	A. J. Allmendinger (R)	Red Bull Racing Team	Toyota	Red Bull
88	Ricky Rudd	Robert Yates Racing	Ford	Snickers
96	Tony Raines	Hall of Fame Racing	Chevrolet	DLP HDTV, Texas Instruments
99	Carl Edwards	Roush Racing	Ford	Office Depot
Official entry list

== Practice ==
=== First practice ===
The first practice session was held on Friday, March 16, at 3:30 PM EST. The session would last for one hour and 30 minutes. Kurt Busch, driving for Penske Racing South, would set the fastest time in the session, with a lap of 29.165 and an average speed of 190.091 miles per hour (305.922 km/h).

Pos.	#	Driver	Team	Make	Time	Speed
1	2	Kurt Busch	Penske Racing South	Dodge	29.165	190.091
2	16	Greg Biffle	Roush Racing	Ford	29.310	189.150
3	5	Kyle Busch	Hendrick Motorsports	Chevrolet	29.343	188.938
Full first practice results

=== Second practice ===
The second practice session was held on Saturday, March 17, at 10:00 AM EST. The session would last for 50 minutes. Jimmie Johnson, driving for Hendrick Motorsports, would set the fastest time in the session, with a lap of 29.297 and an average speed of 189.234 miles per hour (304.543 km/h)

Pos.	#	Driver	Team	Make	Time	Speed
1	48	Jimmie Johnson	Hendrick Motorsports	Chevrolet	29.297	189.234
2	16	Greg Biffle	Roush Racing	Ford	29.340	188.957
3	99	Carl Edwards	Roush Fenway Racing	Ford	29.422	188.430
Full second practice results

=== Final practice ===
The final practice session, sometimes referred to as Happy Hour, was held on Saturday, March 17, at 1:20 PM EST. The session would last for one hour. Kurt Busch, driving for Penske Racing South, would set the fastest time in the session, with a lap of 29.371 and an average speed of 188.758 miles per hour (303.777 km/h).

Pos.	#	Driver	Team	Make	Time	Speed
1	2	Kurt Busch	Penske Racing South	Dodge	29.371	188.758
2	99	Carl Edwards	Roush Fenway Racing	Ford	29.433	188.360
3	48	Jimmie Johnson	Hendrick Motorsports	Chevrolet	29.439	188.322
Full Happy Hour practice results

== Qualifying ==
Qualifying was held on Friday, March 9, at 6:10 PM EST. Each driver would have two laps to set a fastest time; the fastest of the two would count as their official qualifying lap. While positions 1-42 would be determined by qualifying speed, the top 35 teams in owner's points would be assured that they would earn a spot in the field if they had managed to make an effort to qualify. The remaining seven positions from positions 36-42 would be assigned to those drivers with the fastest qualifying speeds whose car owners are not among the top 35. The final starting position, position 43, can be utilized by a car owner whose driver is a current or past NASCAR Nextel Cup champion who participated as a driver during the current of previous season and was entered in the event for that owner in that car prior to the entry deadline. In the case that iff there was more than one series champion vying for the position, it would be given to the most recent series champion. If the final provisional starting position is not filled by a current or past series champion, it will be assigned to the next eligible car owner according to qualifying results.

Ryan Newman, driving for Penske Racing South, would win the pole, setting a time of 28.707 and an average speed of 193.124 miles per hour (310.803 km/h).

Eight drivers would fail to qualify.

=== Full qualifying results ===
Pos.	#	Driver	Team	Make	Time	Speed
1	12	Ryan Newman	Penske Racing South	Dodge	28.707	193.124
2	19	Elliott Sadler	Evernham Motorsports	Dodge	28.891	191.894
3	48	Jimmie Johnson	Hendrick Motorsports	Chevrolet	28.907	191.788
4	01	Mark Martin	Ginn Racing	Chevrolet	28.909	191.774
5	24	Jeff Gordon	Hendrick Motorsports	Chevrolet	28.918	191.714
6	43	Bobby Labonte	Petty Enterprises	Dodge	28.928	191.648
7	40	David Stremme	Chip Ganassi Racing	Dodge	28.949	191.509
8	5	Kyle Busch	Hendrick Motorsports	Chevrolet	28.950	191.503
9	49	Mike Bliss	BAM Racing	Dodge	29.011	191.100
10	10	Scott Riggs	Evernham Motorsports	Dodge	29.039	190.916
11	41	Reed Sorenson	Chip Ganassi Racing	Dodge	29.051	190.837
12	9	Kasey Kahne	Evernham Motorsports	Dodge	29.074	190.686
13	20	Tony Stewart	Joe Gibbs Racing	Chevrolet	29.088	190.594
14	99	Carl Edwards	Roush Fenway Racing	Ford	29.118	190.398
15	07	Clint Bowyer	Richard Childress Racing	Chevrolet	29.122	190.372
16	42	Juan Pablo Montoya (R)	Chip Ganassi Racing	Dodge	29.134	190.293
17	2	Kurt Busch	Penske Racing South	Dodge	29.150	190.189
18	1	Martin Truex Jr.	Dale Earnhardt, Inc.	Chevrolet	29.152	190.176
19	13	Joe Nemechek	Ginn Racing	Chevrolet	29.186	189.954
20	18	J. J. Yeley	Joe Gibbs Racing	Chevrolet	29.202	189.850
21	17	Matt Kenseth	Roush Fenway Racing	Ford	29.204	189.837
22	8	Dale Earnhardt Jr.	Dale Earnhardt, Inc.	Chevrolet	29.204	189.837
23	15	Paul Menard (R)	Dale Earnhardt, Inc.	Chevrolet	29.207	189.818
24	00	David Reutimann (R)	Michael Waltrip Racing	Toyota	29.225	189.701
25	16	Greg Biffle	Roush Fenway Racing	Ford	29.246	189.564
26	70	Johnny Sauter	Haas CNC Racing	Chevrolet	29.261	189.467
27	38	David Gilliland	Robert Yates Racing	Ford	29.274	189.383
28	14	Sterling Marlin	Ginn Racing	Chevrolet	29.317	189.105
29	21	Ken Schrader	Wood Brothers Racing	Ford	29.323	189.067
30	11	Denny Hamlin	Joe Gibbs Racing	Chevrolet	29.358	188.841
31	83	Brian Vickers	Red Bull Racing Team	Toyota	29.360	188.828
32	31	Jeff Burton	Richard Childress Racing	Chevrolet	29.412	188.495
33	96	Tony Raines	Hall of Fame Racing	Chevrolet	29.425	188.411
34	25	Casey Mears	Hendrick Motorsports	Chevrolet	29.433	188.360
35	22	Dave Blaney	Bill Davis Racing	Toyota	29.442	188.302
36	29	Kevin Harvick	Richard Childress Racing	Chevrolet	29.496	187.958
37	26	Jamie McMurray	Roush Fenway Racing	Ford	29.626	187.133
Qualified by owner's points
38	6	David Ragan (R)	Roush Fenway Racing	Ford	29.846	185.753
39	7	Robby Gordon	Robby Gordon Motorsports	Ford	29.888	185.492
40	45	Kyle Petty	Petty Enterprises	Dodge	30.049	184.499
41	66	Jeff Green	Haas CNC Racing	Chevrolet	30.071	184.364
42	88	Ricky Rudd	Robert Yates Racing	Ford	30.210	183.515
Champion's Provisional
43	44	Dale Jarrett	Michael Waltrip Racing	Toyota	29.701	186.660
Failed to qualify
44	33	Scott Wimmer	Richard Childress Racing	Chevrolet	29.372	188.751
45	4	Ward Burton	Morgan–McClure Motorsports	Chevrolet	29.392	188.623
46	37	John Andretti	Front Row Motorsports	Dodge	29.487	188.015
47	55	Michael Waltrip	Michael Waltrip Racing	Toyota	29.560	187.551
48	78	Kenny Wallace	Furniture Row Racing	Chevrolet	29.565	187.519
49	34	Kevin Lepage	Front Row Motorsports	Dodge	29.666	186.881
50	36	Jeremy Mayfield	Bill Davis Racing	Toyota	29.897	185.437
51	84	A. J. Allmendinger (R)	Red Bull Racing Team	Toyota	-	-
Official qualifying results

== Race results ==
Fin	St	#	Driver	Team	Make	Laps	Led	Status	Pts	Winnings
1	3	48	Jimmie Johnson	Hendrick Motorsports	Chevrolet	325	135	running	195	$233,261
2	13	20	Tony Stewart	Joe Gibbs Racing	Chevrolet	325	121	running	175	$165,461
3	21	17	Matt Kenseth	Roush Fenway Racing	Ford	325	11	running	170	$145,016
4	32	31	Jeff Burton	Richard Childress Racing	Chevrolet	325	2	running	165	$134,516
5	16	42	Juan Pablo Montoya (R)	Chip Ganassi Racing	Dodge	325	0	running	155	$126,200
6	15	07	Clint Bowyer	Richard Childress Racing	Chevrolet	325	2	running	155	$87,925
7	14	99	Carl Edwards	Roush Fenway Racing	Ford	325	0	running	146	$86,625
8	18	1	Martin Truex Jr.	Dale Earnhardt, Inc.	Chevrolet	325	0	running	142	$109,520
9	11	41	Reed Sorenson	Chip Ganassi Racing	Dodge	325	1	running	143	$104,433
10	4	01	Mark Martin	Ginn Racing	Chevrolet	325	0	running	134	$112,183
11	17	2	Kurt Busch	Penske Racing South	Dodge	325	14	running	135	$110,408
12	5	24	Jeff Gordon	Hendrick Motorsports	Chevrolet	325	30	running	132	$118,561
13	7	40	David Stremme	Chip Ganassi Racing	Dodge	325	0	running	124	$75,875
14	22	8	Dale Earnhardt Jr.	Dale Earnhardt, Inc.	Chevrolet	325	0	running	121	$116,133
15	37	26	Jamie McMurray	Roush Fenway Racing	Ford	325	0	running	118	$83,475
16	6	43	Bobby Labonte	Petty Enterprises	Dodge	325	1	running	120	$110,911
17	19	13	Joe Nemechek	Ginn Racing	Chevrolet	325	0	running	112	$70,075
18	2	19	Elliott Sadler	Evernham Motorsports	Dodge	325	1	running	114	$92,670
19	30	11	Denny Hamlin	Joe Gibbs Racing	Chevrolet	324	0	running	106	$88,650
20	39	7	Robby Gordon	Robby Gordon Motorsports	Ford	324	0	running	103	$75,725
21	9	49	Mike Bliss	BAM Racing	Dodge	324	0	running	100	$86,783
22	20	18	J. J. Yeley	Joe Gibbs Racing	Chevrolet	324	0	running	97	$100,233
23	1	12	Ryan Newman	Penske Racing South	Dodge	324	0	running	94	$111,000
24	28	14	Sterling Marlin	Ginn Racing	Chevrolet	324	0	running	91	$84,333
25	36	29	Kevin Harvick	Richard Childress Racing	Chevrolet	324	1	running	93	$117,736
26	42	88	Ricky Rudd	Robert Yates Racing	Ford	323	0	running	85	$102,283
27	35	22	Dave Blaney	Bill Davis Racing	Toyota	323	1	running	87	$88,572
28	34	25	Casey Mears	Hendrick Motorsports	Chevrolet	323	0	running	79	$78,375
29	26	70	Johnny Sauter	Haas CNC Racing	Chevrolet	323	0	running	76	$67,700
30	27	38	David Gilliland	Robert Yates Racing	Ford	323	0	running	73	$95,289
31	23	15	Paul Menard (R)	Dale Earnhardt, Inc.	Chevrolet	323	0	running	70	$67,500
32	8	5	Kyle Busch	Hendrick Motorsports	Chevrolet	322	0	running	67	$75,425
33	38	6	David Ragan (R)	Roush Fenway Racing	Ford	322	0	running	64	$104,125
34	40	45	Kyle Petty	Petty Enterprises	Dodge	322	0	running	61	$67,275
35	41	66	Jeff Green	Haas CNC Racing	Chevrolet	322	0	running	58	$75,240
36	43	44	Dale Jarrett	Michael Waltrip Racing	Toyota	320	0	running	55	$67,205
37	29	21	Ken Schrader	Wood Brothers Racing	Ford	318	0	running	52	$87,384
38	33	96	Tony Raines	Hall of Fame Racing	Chevrolet	318	0	running	49	$75,885
39	12	9	Kasey Kahne	Evernham Motorsports	Dodge	306	0	running	46	$114,291
40	24	00	David Reutimann (R)	Michael Waltrip Racing	Toyota	295	0	running	43	$67,060
41	25	16	Greg Biffle	Roush Fenway Racing	Ford	280	0	running	40	$85,015
42	31	83	Brian Vickers	Red Bull Racing Team	Toyota	227	5	crash	42	$67,270
43	10	10	Scott Riggs	Evernham Motorsports	Dodge	221	0	engine	34	$74,334
Failed to qualify
44		33	Scott Wimmer	Richard Childress Racing	Chevrolet					
45		4	Ward Burton	Morgan–McClure Motorsports	Chevrolet					
46		37	John Andretti	Front Row Motorsports	Dodge					
47		55	Michael Waltrip	Michael Waltrip Racing	Toyota					
48		78	Kenny Wallace	Furniture Row Racing	Chevrolet					
49		34	Kevin Lepage	Front Row Motorsports	Dodge					
50		36	Jeremy Mayfield	Bill Davis Racing	Toyota					
51		84	A. J. Allmendinger (R)	Red Bull Racing Team	Toyota					
Official race results

== Standings after the race ==
Drivers' Championship standings

	Pos	Driver	Points
	1	Mark Martin	629
	2	Jeff Gordon	621 (-8)
	3	Jeff Burton	618 (-11)
	4	Jimmie Johnson	601 (–23)
	5	Matt Kenseth	567 (–62)
7	6	Tony Stewart	507 (–122)
1	7	Kevin Harvick	482 (–147)
	8	Denny Hamlin	480 (–149)
9	9	Clint Bowyer	479 (–150)
7	10	Carl Edwards	471 (–158)
	11	David Stremme	463 (–166)
3	12	J. J. Yeley	462 (–167)
Official driver's standings

- Note: Only the first 12 positions are included for the driver standings.

Previous race: 2007 UAW-DaimlerChrysler 400	NASCAR Nextel Cup Series; 2007 season	Next race: 2007 Food City 500
