= 2009 NASCAR Sprint All-Star Race =

25th iteration of the NASCAR All-Star Race

The NASCAR Sprint Showdown and Sprint All-Star Race XXV was the 25th anniversary running of NASCAR's special non-championship race involving winners of the 2008 and 2009 NASCAR Sprint Cup Series races through the 2009 Southern 500 presented by GoDaddy.com as well as Sprint All-Star Race XV-XXIV winners, and past Sprint Cup champions from the decade covering 1999 to 2008. The event was run Saturday night, May 16, 2009, at the 1.5 miles (2.4 km) Lowe's Motor Speedway in the Charlotte, North Carolina suburb of Concord. Both the All-Star Race and the Showdown were broadcast on Speed in the United States while MRN broadcast it on the radio and SiriusXM on satellite radio. Tony Stewart would go on to win the event.

== Eligible drivers and teams ==
The following drivers qualified for the race in these categories:

=== Past Cup champion drivers ===
The following six drivers fit into the past Champions category:

- Tony Stewart (three-time series champion)
- Jimmie Johnson (seven-time series champion, and reigning champion)
- Kurt Busch (2004 series champion)
- Matt Kenseth (2003 series champion)
- Jeff Gordon (four-time series champion, most recently 2001)
- Bobby Labonte (2000 series champion)

=== Past All-Star Race winning drivers ===
The following five drivers were eligible as a past winner of the event in the last decade:

- Kasey Kahne (2008 Sprint All-Star Race)
- Kevin Harvick (Sprint All-Star Race XXIII winner)
- Mark Martin (Sprint All-Star Race XXI winner)
- Ryan Newman (Sprint All-Star Race XVIII winner)
- Dale Earnhardt Jr. (Sprint All-Star Race XVI winner)

=== 2008 and 2009 race winners ===
The following seven drivers were eligible by winning a Sprint Cup points race in 2008 or 2009:

- Greg Biffle (2008 Sylvania 300)
- Carl Edwards (2008 Auto Club 500)
- Kyle Busch (2008 Kobalt Tools 500)
- Denny Hamlin (2008 Goody's Cool Orange 500)
- Clint Bowyer (2008 Crown Royal Presents the Dan Lowry 400)
- Jeff Burton (2008 Food City 500)
- Brad Keselowski (2009 Aaron's 499)

=== Qualified in the top two of the 2009 NASCAR Sprint Showdown ===
- Sam Hornish Jr.
- Jamie McMurray

=== Received the 2009 fan vote ===
- Joey Logano

NOTE: Joey Logano was the youngest driver to race the NASCAR All-Star Race in the 25 years of the event.

== Entry list ==
=== Showdown ===
#	Driver	Team	Make
00	David Reutimann	Michael Waltrip Racing	Toyota
1	Martin Truex Jr.	Earnhardt Ganassi Racing	Chevrolet
06	David Starr	Boys Will Be Boys Racing	Dodge
6	David Ragan	Roush Fenway Racing	Ford
07	Casey Mears	Richard Childress Racing	Chevrolet
7	Robby Gordon	Robby Gordon Motorsports	Toyota
08	Boris Said	Carter Simo Racing	Dodge
12	David Stremme	Penske Racing	Dodge
13	Max Papis (R)	Germain Racing	Toyota
19	Elliott Sadler	Richard Petty Motorsports	Dodge
20	Joey Logano (R)	Joe Gibbs Racing	Toyota
21	Bill Elliott	Wood Brothers Racing	Ford
26	Jamie McMurray	Roush Fenway Racing	Ford
27	Kirk Shelmerdine	Kirk Shelmerdine Racing	Toyota
34	Tony Raines	Front Row Motorsports	Chevrolet
36	Scott Riggs	Tommy Baldwin Racing	Toyota
37	Mike Wallace	Front Row Motorsports	Chevrolet
41	J. J. Yeley	Mayfield Motorsports	Toyota
42	Juan Pablo Montoya	Earnhardt Ganassi Racing	Chevrolet
43	Reed Sorenson	Richard Petty Motorsports	Dodge
44	A. J. Allmendinger	Richard Petty Motorsports	Dodge
46	Carl Long	Carl Long Racing	Dodge
47	Marcos Ambrose	JTG Daugherty Racing	Toyota
51	Dexter Bean (R)	BlackJack Racing	Dodge
55	Michael Waltrip	Michael Waltrip Racing	Toyota
57	Norm Benning	Norm Benning Racing	Chevrolet
64	Todd Bodine	Gunselman Motorsports	Toyota
66	Dave Blaney	Prism Motorsports	Toyota
71	David Gilliland	TRG Motorsports	Chevrolet
73	Mike Garvey	H&S Motorsports	Dodge
75	Derrike Cope	Cope/Keller Racing	Dodge
77	Sam Hornish Jr.	Penske Racing	Dodge
82	Scott Speed (R)	Red Bull Racing Team	Toyota
83	Brian Vickers	Red Bull Racing Team	Toyota
87	Joe Nemechek	NEMCO Motorsports	Toyota
98	Paul Menard	Yates Racing	Ford

=== All-Star Race ===
#	Driver	Team	Make
2	Kurt Busch	Penske Racing	Dodge
5	Mark Martin	Hendrick Motorsports	Chevrolet
09	Brad Keselowski	Phoenix Racing	Chevrolet
9	Kasey Kahne	Richard Petty Motorsports	Dodge
11	Denny Hamlin	Joe Gibbs Racing	Toyota
14	Tony Stewart	Stewart–Haas Racing	Chevrolet
16	Greg Biffle	Roush Fenway Racing	Ford
17	Matt Kenseth	Roush Fenway Racing	Ford
18	Kyle Busch	Joe Gibbs Racing	Toyota
24	Jeff Gordon	Hendrick Motorsports	Chevrolet
29	Kevin Harvick	Richard Childress Racing	Chevrolet
31	Jeff Burton	Richard Childress Racing	Chevrolet
33	Clint Bowyer	Richard Childress Racing	Chevrolet
39	Ryan Newman	Stewart–Haas Racing	Chevrolet
48	Jimmie Johnson	Hendrick Motorsports	Chevrolet
88	Dale Earnhardt Jr.	Hendrick Motorsports	Chevrolet
96	Bobby Labonte	Hall of Fame Racing	Ford
99	Carl Edwards	Roush Fenway Racing	Ford

== Qualifying ==
The qualifying for the Showdown, which was scheduled for May 15 was cancelled for the first time in history, due to rain. Usually, NASCAR rules state that the cars would start on the rulebook factor (top 35 owners, plus qualifying attempts and past champions), but as this was a non-points race, the cars starting position were based on the qualifying order draw. As a result, Kirk Shelmerdine was on the pole. However, he and outside pole winner Carl Long started from the back as neither had presented their cars on time, so David Stremme and Dave Blaney started the race up front.

For the All-Star Race, the format is different from the regular qualifying that occurs in the weekly events. There are three laps, including a four-tire pit stop following either the first or second lap with penalties for loose lugnuts and violating the pit road speed limit on entry. Jimmie Johnson had the fastest time, and started on the pole. Tony Stewart only took two tires but then backed up and changed the other two tires on his pit stop. He did not receive a penalty since he went back and changed the other two tires, but it did cause him to start 15th.

=== Showdown ===
Pos.	#	Driver	Team	Make
1	27	Kirk Shelmerdine*	Kirk Shelmerdine Racing	Toyota
2	46	Carl Long*	Carl Long Racing	Dodge
3	12	David Stremme	Penske Racing	Dodge
4	66	Dave Blaney	Prism Motorsports	Toyota
5	36	Scott Riggs	Tommy Baldwin Racing	Toyota
6	1	Martin Truex Jr.	Earnhardt Ganassi Racing	Chevrolet
7	6	David Ragan	Roush Fenway Racing	Ford
8	77	Sam Hornish Jr.	Penske Racing	Dodge
9	13	Max Papis (R)	Germain Racing	Toyota
10	44	A. J. Allmendinger	Richard Petty Motorsports	Dodge
11	42	Juan Pablo Montoya	Earnhardt Ganassi Racing	Chevrolet
12	37	Mike Wallace	Front Row Motorsports	Chevrolet
13	00	David Reutimann	Michael Waltrip Racing	Toyota
14	47	Marcos Ambrose	JTG Daugherty Racing	Toyota
15	51	Dexter Bean (R)	BlackJack Racing	Dodge
16	21	Bill Elliott	Wood Brothers Racing	Ford
17	75	Derrike Cope	Cope/Keller Racing	Dodge
18	57	Norm Benning	Norm Benning Racing	Chevrolet
19	20	Joey Logano (R)	Joe Gibbs Racing	Toyota
20	82	Scott Speed (R)	Red Bull Racing Team	Toyota
21	87	Joe Nemechek	NEMCO Motorsports	Toyota
22	71	David Gilliland	TRG Motorsports	Chevrolet
23	07	Casey Mears	Richard Childress Racing	Chevrolet
24	98	Paul Menard	Yates Racing	Ford
25	73	Mike Garvey	H&S Motorsports	Dodge
26	64	Todd Bodine	Gunselman Motorsports	Toyota
27	19	Elliott Sadler	Richard Petty Motorsports	Dodge
28	55	Michael Waltrip	Michael Waltrip Racing	Toyota
29	06	David Starr	Boys Will Be Boys Racing	Dodge
30	26	Jamie McMurray	Roush Fenway Racing	Ford
31	83	Brian Vickers	Red Bull Racing Team	Toyota
32	7	Robby Gordon	Robby Gordon Motorsports	Toyota
33	41	J. J. Yeley	Mayfield Motorsports	Toyota
34	43	Reed Sorenson	Richard Petty Motorsports	Dodge
35	34	Tony Raines	Front Row Motorsports	Chevrolet
Withdrew
WD	08	Boris Said	Carter Simo Racing	Dodge

=== All-Star Race ===
Pos.	#	Driver	Team	Make
1	48	Jimmie Johnson	Hendrick Motorsports	Chevrolet
2	2	Kurt Busch	Penske Racing	Dodge
3	17	Matt Kenseth	Roush Fenway Racing	Ford
4	88	Dale Earnhardt Jr.	Hendrick Motorsports	Chevrolet
5	5	Mark Martin	Hendrick Motorsports	Chevrolet
6	24	Jeff Gordon	Hendrick Motorsports	Chevrolet
7	96	Bobby Labonte	Hall of Fame Racing	Ford
8	9	Kasey Kahne	Richard Petty Motorsports	Dodge
9	29	Kevin Harvick	Richard Childress Racing	Chevrolet
10	09	Brad Keselowski	Phoenix Racing	Chevrolet
11	16	Greg Biffle	Roush Fenway Racing	Ford
12	39	Ryan Newman	Stewart–Haas Racing	Chevrolet
13	18	Kyle Busch	Joe Gibbs Racing	Toyota
14	99	Carl Edwards	Roush Fenway Racing	Ford
15	14	Tony Stewart	Stewart–Haas Racing	Chevrolet
16	31	Jeff Burton	Richard Childress Racing	Chevrolet
17	33	Clint Bowyer	Richard Childress Racing	Chevrolet
18	11	Denny Hamlin	Joe Gibbs Racing	Toyota
19	77	Sam Hornish Jr.**	Penske Racing	Dodge
20	26	Jamie McMurray**	Roush Fenway Racing	Ford
21	20	Joey Logano (R)***	Joe Gibbs Racing	Toyota

* Had to start at the rear of the field.

** Made the All-Star race via finishing top 2 in the Showdown.

*** Made the All-Star race via fan vote.

== Format change ==
For 2009, the race remained 100 laps, but the four segments were altered. The first "quarter" consisted of 50 laps, with a mandatory green flag pit stop at Lap 25. This was followed by two 20-lap segments, then a ten-minute intermission and a final, 10-green flag lap shootout for the cash.

Also, only drivers qualified for the race, unlike previous years, where drivers and teams both qualified for the event by winning a race from the 2008 Daytona 500 until the 2009 Southern 500 presented by GoDaddy.com.

Sam Hornish Jr. and Jamie McMurray finished 1st and 2nd in the Sprint Showdown (a pair of 20-lap races—20 laps in the first, 20 green flag laps in the second). Sprint customers and fan balloting onsite at NASCAR events voted in Joey Logano.

== Race results ==
=== Showdown ===
Pos.	#	Driver	Team	Make	Laps	Led	Status
1	77	Sam Hornish Jr.	Penske Racing	Dodge	40	15	running
2	26	Jamie McMurray	Roush Fenway Racing	Ford	40	0	running
3	12	David Stremme	Penske Racing	Dodge	40	25	running
4	00	David Reutimann	Michael Waltrip Racing	Toyota	40	0	running
5	20	Joey Logano (R)	Joe Gibbs Racing	Toyota	40	0	running
6	1	Martin Truex Jr.	Earnhardt Ganassi Racing	Chevrolet	40	0	running
7	44	A. J. Allmendinger	Richard Petty Motorsports	Dodge	40	0	running
8	6	David Ragan	Roush Fenway Racing	Ford	40	0	running
9	7	Robby Gordon	Robby Gordon Motorsports	Toyota	40	0	running
10	47	Marcos Ambrose	JTG Daugherty Racing	Toyota	40	0	running
11	66	Dave Blaney	Prism Motorsports	Toyota	40	0	running
12	42	Juan Pablo Montoya	Earnhardt Ganassi Racing	Chevrolet	40	0	running
13	07	Casey Mears	Richard Childress Racing	Chevrolet	40	0	running
14	55	Michael Waltrip	Michael Waltrip Racing	Toyota	40	0	running
15	71	David Gilliland	TRG Motorsports	Chevrolet	40	0	running
16	21	Bill Elliott	Wood Brothers Racing	Ford	40	0	running
17	98	Paul Menard	Yates Racing	Ford	40	0	running
18	43	Reed Sorenson	Richard Petty Motorsports	Dodge	40	0	running
19	82	Scott Speed (R)	Red Bull Racing Team	Toyota	40	0	running
20	87	Joe Nemechek	NEMCO Motorsports	Toyota	40	0	running
21	13	Max Papis (R)	Germain Racing	Toyota	40	0	running
22	41	J. J. Yeley	Mayfield Motorsports	Toyota	40	0	running
23	51	Dexter Bean (R)	BlackJack Racing	Dodge	40	0	running
24	34	Tony Raines	Front Row Motorsports	Chevrolet	40	0	running
25	36	Scott Riggs	Tommy Baldwin Racing	Toyota	40	0	running
26	37	Mike Wallace	Front Row Motorsports	Chevrolet	40	0	running
27	64	Todd Bodine	Gunselman Motorsports	Toyota	40	0	running
28	75	Derrike Cope	Cope/Keller Racing	Dodge	40	0	running
29	73	Mike Garvey	H&S Motorsports	Dodge	40	0	running
30	06	David Starr	Boys Will Be Boys Racing	Dodge	40	0	running
31	57	Norm Benning	Norm Benning Racing	Chevrolet	39	0	running
32	27	Kirk Shelmerdine	Kirk Shelmerdine Racing	Toyota	39	0	running
33	19	Elliott Sadler	Richard Petty Motorsports	Dodge	25	0	crash
34	83	Brian Vickers	Red Bull Racing Team	Toyota	11	0	crash
35	46	Carl Long	Carl Long Racing	Dodge	3	0	engine

=== All-Star Race ===
Pos.	#	Driver	Team	Make	Laps	Led	Status
1	14	Tony Stewart	Stewart–Haas Racing	Chevrolet	100	2	running
2	17	Matt Kenseth	Roush Fenway Racing	Ford	100	4	running
3	2	Kurt Busch	Penske Racing	Dodge	100	0	running
4	11	Denny Hamlin	Joe Gibbs Racing	Toyota	100	0	running
5	99	Carl Edwards	Roush Fenway Racing	Ford	100	0	running
6	5	Mark Martin	Hendrick Motorsports	Chevrolet	100	0	running
7	18	Kyle Busch	Joe Gibbs Racing	Toyota	100	33	running
8	20	Joey Logano (R)	Joe Gibbs Racing	Toyota	100	0	running
9	26	Jamie McMurray	Roush Fenway Racing	Ford	100	0	running
10	88	Dale Earnhardt Jr.	Hendrick Motorsports	Chevrolet	100	0	running
11	96	Bobby Labonte	Hall of Fame Racing	Ford	100	0	running
12	33	Clint Bowyer	Richard Childress Racing	Chevrolet	100	0	running
13	48	Jimmie Johnson	Hendrick Motorsports	Chevrolet	100	50	running
14	9	Kasey Kahne	Richard Petty Motorsports	Dodge	100	0	running
15	29	Kevin Harvick	Richard Childress Racing	Chevrolet	100	0	running
16	77	Sam Hornish Jr.	Penske Racing	Dodge	100	0	running
17	09	Brad Keselowski	Phoenix Racing	Chevrolet	100	0	running
18	39	Ryan Newman	Stewart–Haas Racing	Chevrolet	93	0	crash
19	24	Jeff Gordon	Hendrick Motorsports	Chevrolet	92	0	crash
20	31	Jeff Burton	Richard Childress Racing	Chevrolet	85	0	engine
21	16	Greg Biffle	Roush Fenway Racing	Ford	71	0	crash

== Skills challenges ==
=== Pit Crew Challenge presented by Craftsman ===
The "Skills Challenges" of the Sprint All-Star Race began with the May 14 Craftsman NASCAR All-Star Pit Crew Challenge at Time Warner Cable Arena in Charlotte. A winning pit crew - the Jeff Burton #31 RCR team – and individual tire changers, carriers, and fuelers were crowned as champions of the skills challenge. For winning the event, the Burton team got the first pick on pit road.

=== Pennzoil Victory Challenge ===
The second annual Pennzoil Victory Challenge was held as part of the pre-race activities.

This year's event was changed from a timing skills to a freestyle event similar to NBA Slam-Dunk and NHL Trick Shot challenges.

The five judges were:

- Randy Moss, co-owner, Randy Moss Motorsports and New England Patriots wide receiver
- Ric Flair, retired professional wrestler who also served as the event's honorary race director
- Kevin Costner, actor who also held a pre-race concert with Modern West
- Jimmy Spencer, SPEED
- Montgomery Gentry, the race's grand marshals

Kevin Harvick won the event, beating Clint Bowyer, Jeff Gordon, Greg Biffle, Kasey Kahne, Kyle Busch and Darrell Waltrip

Harvick challenged the Fox Sports analyst, who won Sprint All-Star Race I, to the event on an episode of Trackside Live! on Speed, and Waltrip, who had driven for Dale Earnhardt, Inc. with the #1 Chevrolet in 1998, accepted Harvick's challenge to participate in the Victory Challenge as part of Sprint All-Star Race XXV.

== Carl Long's record penalty ==
In practice for the Sprint Showdown, Carl Long blew a motor and requested to change his engine. Per NASCAR procedure and the one-engine per weekend rule, NASCAR confiscated the blown motor and allowed Long to change his engine. However, in inspecting the blown engine, the engine was found to be 358.17 cubic inches, 0.17 cubic inches too big. (NASCAR reportedly has a tolerance to 0.10 cubic cm.) Long was penalized 200 driver and owner points (despite the race being a non-points event), crew chief Charles Swing was fined $200,000, and the team was suspended for 12 races, a record penalty. Long appealed, claiming the excessive size was due to engine wear and the blowing-up of the engine. He also said the engine had 50 less horsepower that NASCAR's top teams despite being 0.17 cubic cm too big. After initially not being able to pay the fine, a number of donations, including some from NASCAR drivers has allowed the fine to be paid. Although Long lost his appeal, the appeals board did allow Long to compete in lower-level racing series, such as NASCAR Nationwide Series races. The penalty was later reduced from 12 to eight races, but the $200,000 fine was retained.

The $200,000 fine record was broken in 2013 when Michael Waltrip Racing was fined $300,000 for their involvement in Spingate. Long was eventually reinstated and cleared to compete in the Cup Series in May 2017.
