= 2007 Dodge Avenger 500 =

Race details
- Race 11 of 36 in the 2007 NASCAR Nextel Cup Series
- 2007 Dodge Avenger 500 program cover
- Date: May 13, 2007
- Official name: Dodge Avenger 500
- Location: Darlington Raceway, Darlington County, South Carolina
- Course: Permanent racing facility
- Course length: 1.366 miles (2.198 km)
- Distance: 367 laps, 501.322 mi (806.799 km)
- Weather: Mild with temperatures approaching 75 °F (24 °C); wind speeds up to 17.1 miles per hour (27.5 km/h)
- Average speed: 124.372 miles per hour (200.157 km/h)

Pole position
Driver	Clint Bowyer	Richard Childress Racing
- Time: 29.806

Most laps led
Driver	Denny Hamlin	Joe Gibbs Racing
- Laps: 179

Winner
No. 24	Jeff Gordon	Hendrick Motorsports

Television in the United States
- Network: Fox Broadcasting Company
- Announcers: Mike Joy, Darrell Waltrip and Larry McReynolds

The 2007 Dodge Avenger 500, the 58th running of the race, was the eleventh race of the 2007 NASCAR Nextel Cup Series, held at Darlington Raceway in Darlington, South Carolina.

The race was postponed by rain, and was run the following afternoon, May 13 (Mother's Day in the US), the second race in two weeks to be rained out. Coincidentally, the first running of this event in 1957 was postponed by rain and delayed a day later to May 12, exactly 50 years to the originally scheduled date of this race. Originally the third night race on the schedule, this also served as the fifth race to use the Car of Tomorrow template.

Chevrolet continued to dominate the NASCAR Cup Series like it did during the 1990s and through most of the 2000s. Michael Waltrip continued to have a negative number of points in this race due to his major penalty that was not mitigated until late into the 2007 NASCAR Nextel Cup Series season. Spanish-speaking NASCAR fans started to notice Jeff Gordon's dominance in this NASCAR event, making him a close second favorite to Juan Pablo Montoya.

== Last chance for the All-Star Challenge ==
The race served as the final chance for teams and drivers who have not qualified for the Nextel All-Star Challenge to automatically enter that race by winning on the 1.366 mile egg-shaped oval known as "The Lady in Black" and "The Track Too Tough To Tame". If not, they would have to race in the NEXTEL Open race, as either one of the top two drivers or chosen in a fan vote.

== Abrasive surface ==
The Darlington asphalt has been known to be one of the most abrasive in NASCAR, as the sandpaper-like surface shreds tires limiting their run on the track. This situation was rectified later in 2007 when the entire track was resurfaced. As a result, pit row became a concrete surface.

== Qualifying ==
Clint Bowyer won the pole position, the first career pole in the Cup series for the driver of the #07 Chevrolet Impala. Greg Biffle, who had won the two previous Darlington races, sat on the outside of Bowyer. Michael Waltrip missed his 10th straight race, while Ken Schrader returned to the field after sitting out the two previous weeks.

Pos	Car #	Driver	Make	Speed	Time	Behind
1	07	Clint Bowyer	Chevrolet	164.987	29.806	0.000
2	16	Greg Biffle	Ford	164.876	29.826	-0.020
3	26	Jamie McMurray	Ford	164.430	29.907	-0.101
4	99	Carl Edwards	Ford	164.314	29.928	-0.122
5	9	Kasey Kahne	Dodge	164.073	29.972	-0.166
6	78	Kenny Wallace	Chevrolet	163.876	30.008	-0.202
7	11	Denny Hamlin	Chevrolet	163.838	30.015	-0.209
8	21	Ken Schrader	Ford	163.723	30.036	-0.230
9	29	Kevin Harvick	Chevrolet	163.713	30.038	-0.232
10	24	Jeff Gordon	Chevrolet	163.680	30.044	-0.238
11	25	Casey Mears	Chevrolet	163.299	30.114	-0.308
12	48	Jimmie Johnson	Chevrolet	163.289	30.116	-0.310
13	43	Bobby Labonte	Dodge	163.186	30.135	-0.329
14	00	David Reutimann	Toyota	163.175	30.137	-0.331
15	83	Brian Vickers	Toyota	163.153	30.141	-0.335
16	41	Reed Sorenson	Dodge	163.105	30.150	-0.344
17	19	Elliott Sadler	Dodge	163.045	30.161	-0.355
18	2	Kurt Busch	Dodge	163.002	30.169	-0.363
19	70	Johnny Sauter	Chevrolet	162.948	30.179	-0.373
20	84	A. J. Allmendinger	Toyota	162.915	30.185	-0.379
21	8	Dale Earnhardt Jr.	Chevrolet	162.807	30.205	-0.399
22	18	J. J. Yeley	Chevrolet	162.791	30.208	-0.402
23	15	Paul Menard	Chevrolet	162.786	30.209	-0.403
24	6	David Ragan	Ford	162.630	30.238	-0.432
25	1	Martin Truex Jr.	Chevrolet	162.619	30.240	-0.434
26	20	Tony Stewart	Chevrolet	162.555	30.252	-0.446
27	22	Dave Blaney	Toyota	162.452	30.271	-0.465
28	14	Sterling Marlin	Chevrolet	162.356	30.289	-0.483
29	12	Ryan Newman	Dodge	162.276	30.304	-0.498
30	40	David Stremme	Dodge	162.260	30.307	-0.501
31	17	Matt Kenseth	Ford	161.934	30.368	-0.562
32	96	Tony Raines	Chevrolet	161.864	30.381	-0.575
33	7	Robby Gordon	Ford	161.742	30.404	-0.598
34	31	Jeff Burton	Chevrolet	161.545	30.441	-0.635
35	13	Joe Nemechek	Chevrolet	161.503	30.449	-0.643
36	5	Kyle Busch	Chevrolet	161.328	30.482	-0.676
37	01	Mark Martin	Chevrolet	161.317	30.484	-0.678
38	38	David Gilliland	Ford	161.006	30.543	-0.737
39	66	Jeff Green	Chevrolet	160.869	30.569	-0.763
40	88	Ricky Rudd	Ford	160.381	30.662	-0.856
41	42	Juan Montoya	Dodge	160.057	30.724	-0.918
42	45	Kyle Petty	Dodge	159.548	30.822	-1.016
43	37	Kevin Lepage	Dodge	162.329	30.294	-0.488
Failed to qualify
44	36	Jeremy Mayfield	Toyota		30.301	
45	4	Ward Burton	Chevrolet		30.359	
46	49	Mike Bliss	Dodge		30.370	
47	55	Michael Waltrip	Toyota		30.446	
48	44	Dale Jarrett	Toyota		30.480	
49	10	Scott Riggs	Dodge		30.529	

== Race recap ==
Jeff Gordon overcame a radiator problem to win the Dodge Avenger 500. The win was his third in the last four races, his sixth win in the Southern 500, and his 78th overall career. Because of the failure, his car emitted steam for the last 50 laps or so of the race. The race was arguably decided most in the pits. Gordon's crew chief, Steve Letarte, kept the #24 Chevy on the track during what would be the final caution of the race, while all other leaders came in for service. Meanwhile, Denny Hamlin was in position for a weekend sweep (he had won on Friday night in the Busch Series Diamond Hill Plywood 200), but a failure to apply lug nuts correctly on the first attempt led to a long pit stop, after which he never regained the lead. Hamlin still led the most laps on this day and finished second.

The remaining top drivers were in this order: Jimmie Johnson, Ryan Newman, Carl Edwards, Tony Stewart, Matt Kenseth, Dale Earnhardt Jr., Bowyer, and Jeff Burton.

After this race, Gordon led Jimmie Johnson by 231 points for the lead. Earnhardt Jr. led Jamie McMurray by 46 points for the 12th and final position in the Chase for the NEXTEL Cup. However, because of illegal bolts supporting the wing that was discovered in a pre-race inspection, Earnhardt was docked 100 driver points, the team lost 100 owner points and slapped with a US$100,000 fine and crew chief Tony Eury, Sr. was suspended until July 4. Because of the penalties, McMurray was elevated to the final Chase position as a result.

=== Race results ===
(*) denotes Rookie of the Year candidate.

Fin	St	Car #	Driver	Make	Points	Bonus	Laps	Winnings
1	10	24	Jeff Gordon	Chevrolet	190	5	367	$323,286
2	7	11	Denny Hamlin	Chevrolet	180	10	367	$211,550
3	12	48	Jimmie Johnson	Chevrolet	170	5	367	$197,761
4	29	12	Ryan Newman	Dodge	165	5	367	$159,875
5	4	99	Carl Edwards	Ford	160	5	367	$125,475
6	26	20	Tony Stewart	Chevrolet	150		367	$145,961
7	31	17	Matt Kenseth	Ford	151	5	367	$143,516
8	21	8	Dale Earnhardt Jr.	Chevrolet	142		367	$133,033
9	1	07	Clint Bowyer	Chevrolet	143	5	367	$114,575
10	34	31	Jeff Burton	Chevrolet	134		367	$127,541
11	25	1	Martin Truex Jr.	Chevrolet	130		367	$112,320
12	18	2	Kurt Busch	Dodge	127		367	$119,108
13	28	14	Sterling Marlin	Chevrolet	124		367	$104,433
14	37	01	Mark Martin	Chevrolet	121		367	$108,308
15	2	16	Greg Biffle	Ford	118		367	$97,700
16	3	26	Jamie McMurray	Ford	115		367	$89,850
17	9	29	Kevin Harvick	Chevrolet	112		367	$125,886
18	22	18	J. J. Yeley	Chevrolet	109		367	$108,183
19	13	43	Bobby Labonte	Dodge	106		367	$117,036
20	5	9	Kasey Kahne	Dodge	103		367	$124,616
21	17	19	Elliott Sadler	Dodge	105	5	367	$96,370
22	39	66	Jeff Green	Chevrolet	97		365	$100,008
23	41	42	Juan Montoya *	Dodge	94		365	$113,575
24	6	78	Kenny Wallace	Chevrolet	91		365	$75,775
25	42	45	Kyle Petty	Dodge	88		364	$87,233
26	40	88	Ricky Rudd	Ford	85		364	$105,333
27	24	6	David Ragan *	Ford	82		363	$109,425
28	35	13	Joe Nemechek	Chevrolet	79		363	$69,950
29	19	70	Johnny Sauter	Chevrolet	76		361	$69,750
30	38	38	David Gilliland	Ford	73		361	$100,289
31	23	15	Paul Menard *	Chevrolet	70		358	$69,325
32	27	22	Dave Blaney	Toyota	72	5	355	$89,197
33	14	00	David Reutimann *	Toyota	64		351	$69,925
34	30	40	David Stremme	Dodge	61		349	$68,850
35	11	25	Casey Mears	Chevrolet	58		345	$76,600
36	20	84	A. J. Allmendinger *	Toyota	55		344	$68,450
37	36	5	Kyle Busch	Chevrolet	52		338	$86,250
38	33	7	Robby Gordon	Ford	49		317	$68,025
39	32	96	Tony Raines	Chevrolet	46		310	$78,400
40	16	41	Reed Sorenson	Dodge	43		310	$75,750
41	8	21	Ken Schrader	Ford	45	5	254	$87,839
42	43	37	Kevin Lepage	Dodge	37		127	$68,280
43	15	83	Brian Vickers	Toyota	34		122	$67,382

== Notes ==
- The last NASCAR race to be staged on Mother's Day before this one was the Winston (now the NASCAR NEXTEL All-Star Challenge) on May 15, 1986. Bill Elliott was the winner of the exhibition race.
- The race was postponed and moved to Sunday, in violation of South Carolina blue laws, with track president Bob Colvin was fined for the violation. Current blue laws state Sunday racing is legal in South Carolina provided (1) a race is scheduled for more than 250 miles (402 km), or (2) it starts after 1:30 PM.

Previous race: 2007 Crown Royal Presents The Jim Stewart 400	Nextel Cup Series; 2007 season	Next race: 2007 Coca-Cola 600
