= 2009 Pocono 500 =

14th race of 2009 NASCAR Sprint Cup series

Race details
- Race 14 of 36 in the 2009 NASCAR Sprint Cup Series
- Pocono Raceway
- Date: June 7, 2009
- Location: Pocono Raceway, Long Pond, Pennsylvania
- Course: Permanent racing facility
- Course length: 2.5 miles (4.023 km)
- Distance: 200 laps, 500 mi (804.672 km)
- Weather: Temperatures reaching up to 82.4 °F (28.0 °C); average wind speeds of 13 miles per hour (21 km/h)
- Average speed: 138.515 miles per hour (222.918 km/h)

Pole position
Driver	Tony Stewart	Stewart–Haas Racing
- Time: No time trials

Most laps led
Driver	Carl Edwards	Roush Fenway Racing
- Laps: 103

Winner
No. 14	Tony Stewart	Stewart–Haas Racing

Television in the United States
- Network: TNT
- Announcers: Bill Weber, Kyle Petty and Wally Dallenbach Jr.

The 2009 Pocono 500 was the fourteenth points race of the NASCAR Sprint Cup season for 2009, and was run on Sunday, June 7, at the 2.5 miles (4.0 km) Pocono Raceway outside the hamlet of Long Pond, Pennsylvania. The race marked the first of six races in the "Summer Season" schedule for TNT, with pre-race coverage starting at 12:30 pm EDT and radio coverage over MRN (over-the-air) and Sirius XM Radio (satellite) beginning at 1 pm US EDT. It was also the first Cup Series race to mandate all restarts be double-file, which is still an active rule in NASCAR today.

== Double-file restarts implemented ==
- Starting at this race, restarts in all races were performed in a double-file shootout style. Previously, this had only been a permanent part of the two non-points races on the circuit, the Budweiser Shootout and the Sprint All-Star Race. Following a town hall meeting on May 26 at NASCAR's research and development center in suburban Charlotte, North Carolina, where ideas were exchanged, the racing series made the double-file restart permanent as to Thursday (June 4). The rule was extended later to the Nationwide Series and the Camping World Truck Series later in the year. The race leader selects their choice of lane, with all odd-numbered placed drivers behind him, and the even-numbered cars in the opposite lane. The "Lucky Dog" rule will be unchanged, but will now be enforced in all laps.

== Background ==
- Carl Long's suspension and fine were upheld from the Sprint Showdown, meaning Long would miss twelve races, lose both 200 owner and driver points and his crew chief fined a record US $200,000. Long's engine was discovered to be 1 inch (2.5 cm) over the required size. Long would not return to the Cup Series until 2017.

== Qualifying ==
Because of an all-day rain on June 5, qualification was canceled. As a result, the field was set by the rule book.

Failed to make race due to qualifying canceled due to rain: Derrike Cope (#75), Tony Raines (#37), Mike Wallace (#64, was a late entry missing the deadline.)

== Recap ==
After wrecking his primary car in the first practice Saturday, Tony Stewart was sent to the back of the field as a result of bringing out his back-up car. However, he overcame that and used the old fuel mileage strategy trick (as many races in Long Pond usually do) to become the first owner/driver to win since Ricky Rudd won in September of 1998 at Martinsville Speedway. Geoff Bodine was the last owner driver to win at Pocono Raceway. Kevin Harvick made his 300th start in this race, finishing in 24th position.

Previous race: 2009 Autism Speaks 400	Sprint Cup Series; 2009 season	Next race: 2009 LifeLock 400
