= 2007 Food City 500 =

Race details
- Race 5 of 36 in the 2007 NASCAR Nextel Cup Series season
- 2007 Food City 500 program cover
- Date: March 25, 2007
- Official name: Food City 500
- Location: Bristol Motor Speedway, Bristol, Tennessee
- Course: Permanent racing facility
- Course length: 0.857 km (0.533 miles)
- Distance: 504 laps, 268.632 mi (432.321 km)
- Scheduled distance: 500 laps, 266.5 mi (428.89 km)
- Weather: Temperatures reaching up to 82.9 °F (28.3 °C); average wind speed of 6 miles per hour (9.7 km/h)
- Average speed: 81.969 miles per hour (131.916 km/h)

Pole position
Driver	Jeff Gordon	Hendrick Motorsports
- Time: 15.295

Most laps led
Driver	Tony Stewart	Joe Gibbs Racing
- Laps: 257

Winner
No. 5	Kyle Busch	Hendrick Motorsports

Television in the United States
- Network: Fox Broadcasting Company
- Announcers: Mike Joy, Darrell Waltrip and Larry McReynolds

The 2007 Food City 500 was the fifth race of the 2007 NASCAR Nextel Cup season, and was run on Sunday, March 25, 2007, at Bristol Motor Speedway in Bristol, Tennessee. This marked the debut of the Car of Tomorrow.

== Overview ==
The race was historic as this marked the competitive debut of NASCAR's Car of Tomorrow vehicle template, which was tested on February 28 at this facility, as the test was extended due to an impending rainstorm and three sessions were held in one day, including a nighttime session. Because of the success in those tests, NASCAR considered making the CoT permanent in the 2008 season. Additionally, in all CoT events, two brands will switch models, as Dodge will use the Avenger and Chevrolet will utilize the Impala brand.

The event was the last to be run on the original concrete surface as resurfacing started following the race, using specially designed resurfacers that will lay a new concrete surface for the Sharpie 500 event in August. In addition, the 36-degree turns will be altered to progressive banking.

The race was also the last for the Top 35 teams in the 2006 Owner's points to be "locked in" for the race. Starting with the next race, the Goody's Cool Orange 500, the current standings was used.

Jeff Gordon won the pole. Dale Jarrett, who had used a provisional the past four races, qualified 30th. A. J. Allmendinger and Jeremy Mayfield made their season debuts after failing to qualify for the previous four races (qualifying 43rd and 23rd, respectively).

== Failed to qualify ==
The following drivers failed to qualify:

Kevin Lepage (#37), David Reutimann (#00), Michael Waltrip (#55), Joe Nemechek (#13), Johnny Sauter (#70), and Paul Menard (#15) Withdrew: Chad Chaffin (#34)

Of these drivers, Nemechek (who missed his first race in over five years when he was released by Travis Carter because of a lack of sponsorship in 2002) and possibly Sauter could still end up locked into the top-35 after this race, despite missing this race (both had made the previous four races, but drive for new teams with no previous owner points to fall back on). With the car owner points provision for failing to qualify, however, both the Ginn #13 and the Haas CNC #70 remained in the top 35 in owner points, which meant both teams were awarded exemptions for the next race.

The other teams are guaranteed to be out of the top 35.

The #37 team has now missed four of the first five points races, Reutimann and Menard have missed two races, and Waltrip has missed four straight races.

== Race Day ==
The race, despite the introduction of the CoT, was a typical Bristol affair, with 15 caution flags for 90 laps. Tony Stewart, starting from the fourth position, looked to have the car to beat all day. However, during a caution with 211 laps left, Stewart experienced a fuel pressure malfunction, and would finish 35th. The lead was inherited by his Joe Gibbs Racing teammate, Denny Hamlin. Hamlin would hold the lead until with 16 laps to go, Kyle Busch stole the lead from the sophomore in the #5 Kellogg's Chevy for Hendrick Motorsports. It appeared as though Kyle would sail off with his first win of 2007, but a spin by rookie David Ragan set up a green-white-checkered finish with Hendrick Motorsports holding the first two spots. Kyle Busch was second, with teammate Jeff Gordon behind him, and the Richard Childress Racing cars of Jeff Burton and Kevin Harvick behind them. That would not last long however, as on the restart, Kyle spun the tires, allowing Jeff to inch under him; however, Jeff Burton steered his #31 Chevrolet to the outside of Jeff Gordon and attempted to chase down Kyle. Jeff Burton would clear Gordon just as Kyle Busch took the white flag, and would chase down Kyle during the final lap, narrowly losing by half-a-car length at the start-finish line.

Busch's victory was a historic one in many ways. Not only it being the first victory for the Car of Tomorrow, but it was also the 156th win for Hendrick Motorsports, the 600th victory for Chevrolet in NASCAR, and the 61st victory for the Chevrolet Impala nameplate, the last one coming in 1964 when Wendell Scott became the first African-American to win in NASCAR. The first win for the Impala came in 1959 when Bob Welborn won in Daytona. In a post-race ceremony, former 12-time Bristol winner and current NASCAR on Fox commentator Darrell Waltrip, who dropped the green flag for this race, jack-hammered a piece of the original concrete to begin the reconstruction of the track.

=== Race results ===
POS	ST	#	DRIVER	CAR	LAPS	MONEY	STATUS	LED	PTS
1	20	5	Kyle Busch	Chevrolet	504	179400	running	29	190
2	29	31	Jeff Burton	Chevrolet	504	161691	running	0	170
3	1	24	Jeff Gordon	Chevrolet	504	165586	running	6	170
4	40	29	Kevin Harvick	Chevrolet	504	154911	running	9	165
5	11	16	Greg Biffle	Ford	504	111900	running	0	155
6	9	66	Jeff Green	Chevrolet	504	124383	running	0	150
7	31	8	Dale Earnhardt, Jr.	Chevrolet	504	131908	running	0	146
8	18	07	Clint Bowyer	Chevrolet	504	98500	running	0	142
9	5	26	Jamie McMurray	Ford	504	103700	running	0	138
10	16	25	Casey Mears	Chevrolet	504	101750	running	0	134
11	38	17	Matt Kenseth	Ford	504	132816	running	0	130
12	32	99	Carl Edwards	Ford	504	96500	running	0	127
13	33	40	David Stremme	Dodge	504	89875	running	0	124
14	10	11	Denny Hamlin	Chevrolet	504	113750	running	177	126
15	25	83	Brian Vickers	Toyota	504	83500	running	1	123
16	6	48	Jimmie Johnson	Chevrolet	503	138411	running	0	115
17	19	49	Mike Bliss	Dodge	503	103933	running	0	112
18	14	4	Ward Burton	Chevrolet	502	85525	running	0	109
19	2	9	Kasey Kahne	Dodge	501	130591	running	0	106
20	26	45	Kyle Petty	Dodge	501	103533	running	0	103
21	27	78	Kenny Wallace	Chevrolet	501	82525	running	0	100
22	28	43	Bobby Labonte	Dodge	501	123011	running	0	97
23	7	22	Dave Blaney	Toyota	501	106408	running	0	94
24	17	96	Tony Raines	Chevrolet	501	94525	running	0	91
25	12	01	Regan Smith	Chevrolet	501	103297	running	0	88
26	41	6	David Ragan	Ford	501	122350	running	0	85
27	3	19	Elliott Sadler	Dodge	500	103420	running	5	87
28	15	21	Ken Schrader	Ford	500	104489	running	0	79
29	42	2	Kurt Busch	Dodge	499	118483	running	10	81
30	21	14	Sterling Marlin	Chevrolet	499	84475	running	0	73
31	8	10	Scott Riggs	Dodge	498	90675	running	0	70
32	36	42	Juan Pablo Montoya	Dodge	497	114700	running	0	67
33	34	7	Robby Gordon	Ford	493	81025	running	0	64
34	23	36	Jeremy Mayfield	Toyota	486	80025	running	1	66
35	4	20	Tony Stewart	Chevrolet	479	133911	running	257	68
36	37	18	J.J. Yeley	Chevrolet	475	107833	running	9	60
37	13	1	Martin Truex, Jr.	Chevrolet	475	106220	running	0	52
38	24	88	Ricky Rudd	Ford	453	110858	crash	0	49
39	22	12	Ryan Newman	Dodge	449	111850	crash	0	46
40	43	84	A.J. Allmendinger	Toyota	413	79700	running	0	43
41	35	38	David Gilliland	Ford	48	106864	crash	0	40
42	30	44	Dale Jarrett	Toyota	42	79565	crash	0	37
43	39	41	Reed Sorenson	Dodge	21	86932	crash	0	34
Failed to qualify or withdrew
POS	NAME	NBR	SPONSOR	CAR					
44	Kevin Lepage	37		Dodge					
45	David Reutimann	00		Toyota					
46	Michael Waltrip	55		Toyota					
47	Joe Nemechek	13		Chevrolet					
48	Johnny Sauter	70		Chevrolet					
49	Paul Menard	15		Chevrolet					
WD	Chad Chaffin	34		Dodge					

Previous race: 2007 Kobalt Tools 500	Nextel Cup Series; 2007 season	Next race: 2007 Goody's Cool Orange 500
