= 2009 Autism Speaks 400 =

Race details
- Race 13 of 36 in the 2009 NASCAR Sprint Cup Series season
- 2009 Autism Speaks 400 program cover
- Date: May 31, 2009
- Official name: Autism Speaks 400
- Location: Dover International Speedway, Dover, Delaware
- Course: Permanent racing facility
- Course length: 1.0 miles (1.609 km)
- Distance: 400 laps, 400 mi (643.737 km)
- Weather: Temperatures reaching up to 80.6 °F (27.0 °C); wind speeds up to 13 miles per hour (21 km/h)
- Average speed: 115.237 miles per hour (185.456 km/h)

Pole position
Driver	David Reutimann	Michael Waltrip Racing
- Time: 22.960

Most laps led
Driver	Jimmie Johnson	Hendrick Motorsports
- Laps: 298

Winner
No. 48	Jimmie Johnson	Hendrick Motorsports

Television in the United States
- Network: Fox Broadcasting Company
- Announcers: Mike Joy, Darrell Waltrip and Larry McReynolds

The 2009 Autism Speaks 400 presented by Heluva Good! was the thirteenth points race in the 2009 NASCAR Sprint Cup season. Held on May 31 of that year at the 1-mile (1.6 km) Dover International Speedway in Dover, Delaware, consisting of 400 miles (640 km) and marked the halfway point to the 2009 Chase for the Sprint Cup.

== Background ==
Fox Sports, in its 2009 swan song, televised the race beginning at 1:30 PM EDT while MRN (terrestrial) and SiriusXM (satellite) handled radio coverage starting at 1 PM.

The biggest change that year at Dover was a new pit road area. Previously, Dover's pit road only had enough room for 42 pit stalls, meaning one team had to share a pit until a car dropped out of the race. Now, thanks to a new pit wall facing the main stands, widening the lanes within pit road by 4 feet (1.2 m), the area was rebuilt and all 43 cars will have their own pit stalls that are 4 feet (1.2 m) longer than before.

=== Pre-Race News ===
On May 28, 2009, Hendrick Motorsports announced that Tony Eury Jr. had been replaced as the crew chief for Dale Earnhardt Jr. and the No. 88 team. Eury, who is Earnhardt's cousin, had joined the organization from Dale Earnhardt, Inc. (which later merged with Chip Ganassi Racing in 2009) prior to the 2008 season.

The management transition followed a 40th-place finish at the 2009 Coca-Cola 600, leaving the team 19th in the series standings at the time. The following personnel changes were implemented:

Brian Whitesell: The team manager served as the crew chief for the June 7 race at Dover International Speedway.

Lance McGrew: An experienced crew chief within the Hendrick organization, McGrew was named the interim replacement. Although originally scheduled to start at Pocono Raceway, he took over the role a week early at Dover after developmental driver Brad Keselowski failed to qualify for that event.

Michigan International Speedway: McGrew continued as the crew chief for the August race at Michigan, where Earnhardt achieved a third-place finish.

McGrew remained with the No. 88 team through the end of the 2010 season before being replaced by Steve Letarte in 2011.

== Entry list ==
No.	Driver	Make	Team
00	David Reutimann	Toyota	Michael Waltrip Racing
1	Martin Truex Jr	Chevrolet	Earnhardt Ganassi Racing
2	Kurt Busch	Dodge	Penske Racing
5	Mark Martin	Chevrolet	Hendrick Motorsports
06	David Starr	Dodge	Boys Will Be Boys Racing
6	David Ragan	Ford	Roush Fenway Racing
07	Casey Mears	Chevrolet	Richard Childress Racing
7	Robby Gordon	Toyota	Robby Gordon Motorsports
09	Mike Bliss	Dodge	Phoenix Racing
9	Kasey Kahne	Dodge	Richard Petty Motorsports
11	Denny Hamlin	Toyota	Joe Gibbs Racing
12	David Stremme	Dodge	Penske Racing
13	Max Papis	Toyota	Germain Racing
14	Tony Stewart	Chevrolet	Stewart–Haas Racing
16	Greg Biffle	Ford	Roush Fenway Racing
17	Matt Kenseth	Ford	Roush Fenway Racing
18	Kyle Busch	Toyota	Joe Gibbs Racing
19	Elliott Sadler	Dodge	Richard Petty Motorsports
20	Joey Logano	Toyota	Joe Gibbs Racing
24	Jeff Gordon	Chevrolet	Hendrick Motorsports
25	Brad Keselowski	Chevrolet	Hendrick Motorsports
26	Jamie McMurray	Ford	Roush Fenway Racing
29	Kevin Harvick	Chevrolet	Richard Childress Racing
31	Jeff Burton	Chevrolet	Richard Childress Racing
33	Clint Bowyer	Chevrolet	Richard Childress Racing
34	John Andretti	Chevrolet	Front Row Motorsports
36	Mike Skinner	Toyota	Tommy Baldwin Racing
37	Tony Raines	Chevrolet	Front Row Motorsports
39	Ryan Newman	Chevrolet	Stewart–Haas Racing
42	Juan Pablo Montoya	Chevrolet	Earnhardt Ganassi Racing
43	Reed Sorenson	Dodge	Richard Petty Motorsports
44	AJ Allmendinger	Dodge	Richard Petty Motorsports
47	Marcos Ambrose	Toyota	JTG Daugherty Racing
48	Jimmie Johnson	Chevrolet	Hendrick Motorsports
55	Michael Waltrip	Toyota	Michael Waltrip Racing
66	Dave Blaney	Toyota	Prism Motorsports
71	David Gilliland	Chevrolet	TRG Motorsports
75	Derrike Cope	Dodge	Cope-Keller Racing
77	Sam Hornish Jr	Dodge	Penske Racing
78	Regan Smith	Chevrolet	Furniture Row Racing
82	Scott Speed	Toyota	Red Bull Racing Team
83	Brian Vickers	Toyota	Red Bull Racing Team
87	Joe Nemechek	Toyota	NEMCO Motorsports
88	Dale Earnhardt Jr	Chevrolet	Hendrick Motorsports
96	Bobby Labonte	Ford	Hall of Fame Racing
98	Paul Menard	Ford	Yates Racing
99	Carl Edwards	Ford	Roush Fenway Racing

== Qualifying ==
Jeff Gordon wrecked his car in the first run of qualifying. David Reutimann, winner of the previous week's rain-shortened Coca-Cola 600 took his third career pole.

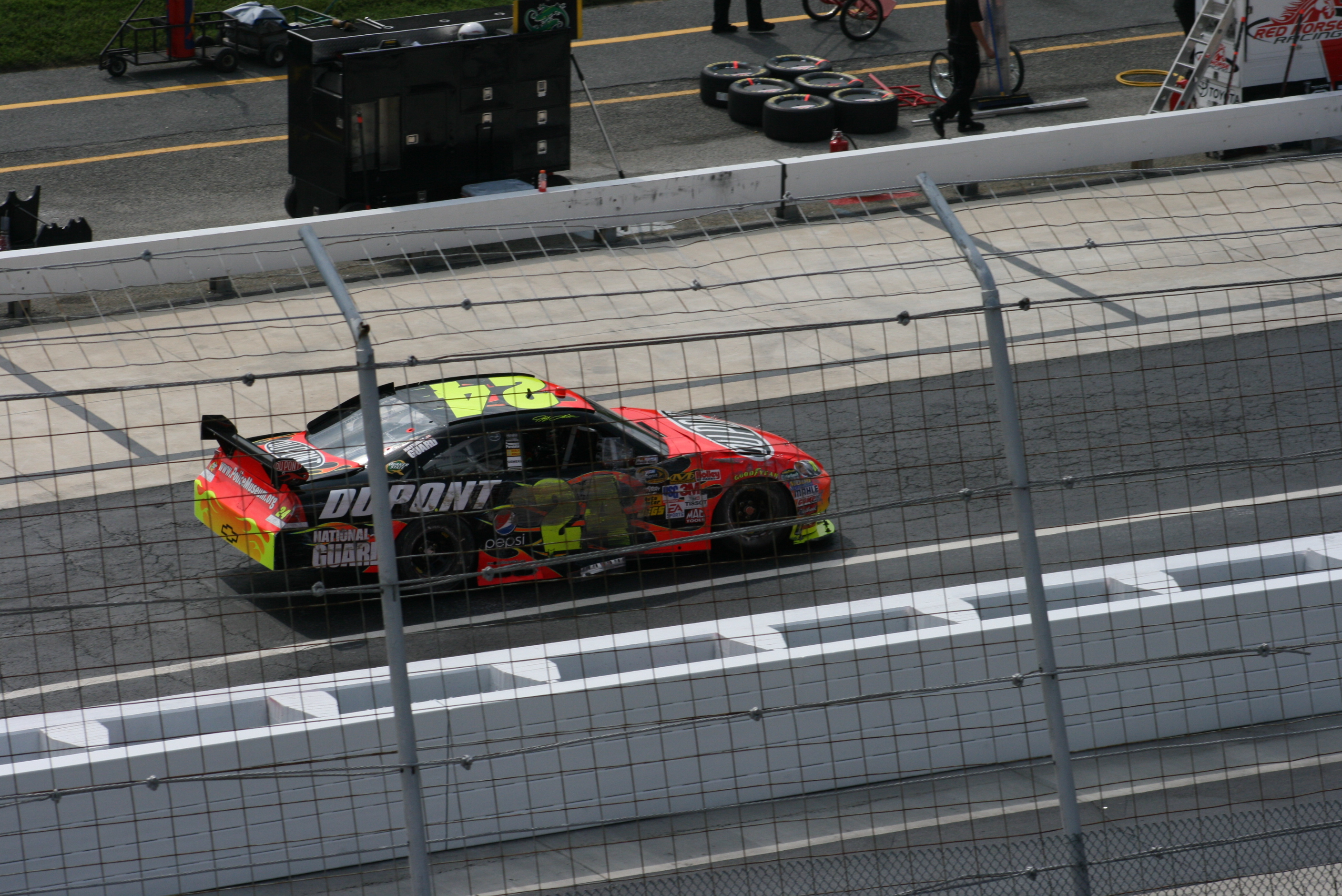
Jeff Gordon damaged his car after hitting the wall during qualifying

Pos.	No.	Driver	Make	Avg. Speed (mph)	Time	Behind
1	00	David Reutimann	Toyota	156.794	22.960	0.000
2	9	Kasey Kahne	Dodge	156.542	22.997	00.037
3	42	Juan Pablo Montoya	Chevrolet	156.020	23.074	00.114
4	43	Reed Sorenson	Dodge	155.952	23.084	00.124
5	16	Greg Biffle	Ford	155.932	23.087	00.127
6	18	Kyle Busch	Toyota	155.885	23.094	00.134
7	44	AJ Allmendinger	Dodge	155.689	23.123	00.163
8	48	Jimmie Johnson	Chevrolet	155.662	23.127	00.167
9	83	Brian Vickers	Toyota	155.595	23.137	00.177
10	19	Elliott Sadler	Dodge	155.514	23.149	00.189
11	39	Ryan Newman	Chevrolet	155.447	23.159	00.199
12	77	Sam Hornish Jr	Dodge	155.440	23.160	00.200
13	99	Carl Edwards	Ford	155.420	23.163	00.203
14	17	Matt Kenseth	Ford	155.313	23.179	00.219
15	1	Martin Truex Jr	Chevrolet	155.313	23.179	00.219
16	11	Denny Hamlin	Toyota	155.152	23.203	00.243
17	07	Casey Mears	Chevrolet	155.085	23.213	00.253
18	26	Jamie McMurray	Ford	155.066	23.216	00.256
19	2	Kurt Busch	Dodge	155.032	23.221	00.261
20	47	Marcos Ambrose	Toyota	154.919	23.238	00.278
21	20	Joey Logano	Toyota	154.812	23.254	00.294
22	88	Dale Earnhardt Jr	Chevrolet	154.799	23.256	00.296
23	82	Scott Speed	Toyota	154.706	23.270	00.310
24	71	David Gilliland	Chevrolet	154.593	23.287	00.327
25	33	Clint Bowyer	Chevrolet	154.573	23.290	00.330
26	6	David Ragan	Ford	154.566	23.291	00.331
27	96	Bobby Labonte	Ford	154.434	23.311	00.351
28	5	Mark Martin	Chevrolet	154.328	23.327	00.367
29	55	Michael Waltrip	Toyota	154.242	23.340	00.380
30	12	David Stremme	Dodge	153.932	23.387	00.427
31	14	Tony Stewart	Chevrolet	153.675	23.426	00.466
32	31	Jeff Burton	Chevrolet	153.577	23.441	00.481
33	78	Regan Smith	Chevrolet	153.446	23.461	00.501
34	36	Mike Skinner	Toyota	153.368	23.473	00.513
35	29	Kevin Harvick	Chevrolet	153.263	23.489	00.529
36	98	Paul Menard	Ford	153.133	23.509	00.549
37	09	Mike Bliss	Dodge	153.120	23.511	00.551
38	87	Joe Nemechek	Toyota	152.853	23.552	00.592
39	66	Dave Blaney	Toyota	152.840	23.554	00.594
40	7	Robby Gordon	Toyota	151.681	23.734	00.774
41	34	John Andretti	Chevrolet	151.471	23.767	00.807
42	24	Jeff Gordon	Chevrolet	0.000	00.000	0.000
43	37	Tony Raines	Chevrolet	152.491	23.608	00.648
Failed to qualify
44	25	Brad Keselowski	Chevrolet	152.265	23.643	
45	13	Max Papis	Toyota	151.815	23.713	
46	75	Derrike Cope	Dodge	0.000	00.000	0.000
47	06	David Starr	Dodge	0.000	00.000	0.000
WD	41	J.J. Yeley	Toyota	0.000	00.000	0.000
WD	64	Todd Bodine	Toyota	0.000	00.000	0.000

== Race recap ==
The Jimmie Johnson #48 Lowe's team chose a rather unusual strategy: they chose the last pit stall (the newly designated 43rd pit stall). It worked to a charm as he led the most laps (298), and made the win with a pass of Tony Stewart with three laps to go and claim the win coming from seventh place on the final pit stop under caution that had earlier cost them the lead.

== Race results ==
Finish	No.	Driver	Make	Team	Laps	Led	Status	Pts	Winnings (USD)
1	48	Jimmie Johnson	Chevrolet	Hendrick Motorsports	400	298	running	195	341151
2	14	Tony Stewart	Chevrolet	Stewart–Haas Racing	400	6	running	175	215398
3	16	Greg Biffle	Ford	Roush Fenway Racing	400	41	running	170	188700
4	17	Matt Kenseth	Ford	Roush Fenway Racing	400	7	running	165	179940
5	2	Kurt Busch	Dodge	Penske Racing	400	0	running	155	136250
6	9	Kasey Kahne	Dodge	Richard Petty Motorsports	400	0	running	150	150398
7	99	Carl Edwards	Ford	Roush Fenway Racing	400	12	running	151	149656
8	39	Ryan Newman	Chevrolet	Stewart–Haas Racing	400	0	running	142	131454
9	07	Casey Mears	Chevrolet	Richard Childress Racing	400	0	running	138	112975
10	5	Mark Martin	Chevrolet	Hendrick Motorsports	400	1	running	139	106825
11	33	Clint Bowyer	Chevrolet	Richard Childress Racing	400	0	running	130	103225
12	88	Dale Earnhardt Jr.	Chevrolet	Hendrick Motorsports	400	0	running	127	107600
13	77	Sam Hornish Jr.	Dodge	Penske Racing	400	0	running	124	112235
14	26	Jamie McMurray	Ford	Roush Fenway Racing	400	0	running	121	101100
15	20	Joey Logano	Toyota	Joe Gibbs Racing	400	0	running	118	137351
16	31	Jeff Burton	Chevrolet	Richard Childress Racing	400	0	running	115	133331
17	29	Kevin Harvick	Chevrolet	Richard Childress Racing	400	0	running	112	127403
18	00	David Reutimann	Toyota	Michael Waltrip Racing	400	25	running	114	125998
19	43	Reed Sorenson	Dodge	Roush Fenway Racing	400	4	running	111	125851
20	47	Marcos Ambrose	Toyota	JTG Daugherty Racing	400	0	running	103	104173
21	1	Martin Truex Jr.	Chevrolet	Earnhardt Ganassi Racing	399	0	running	100	122165
22	78	Regan Smith	Chevrolet	Furniture Row Racing	399	0	running	97	86525
23	18	Kyle Busch	Toyota	Joe Gibbs Racing	399	0	running	94	131248
24	6	David Ragan	Ford	Roush Fenway Racing	399	0	running	91	93675
25	83	Brian Vickers	Toyota	Red Bull Racing Team	399	0	running	88	112973
26	24	Jeff Gordon	Chevrolet	Hendrick Motorsports	398	0	running	85	121851
27	19	Elliott Sadler	Dodge	Roush Fenway Racing	398	2	running	87	91350
28	96	Bobby Labonte	Ford	Hall of Fame Racing	397	0	running	79	110329
29	44	A.J. Allmendinger	Dodge	Roush Fenway Racing	396	0	running	76	82550
30	42	Juan Pablo Montoya	Chevrolet	Earnhardt Ganassi Racing	395	3	running	78	117073
31	12	David Stremme	Dodge	Penske Racing	370	0	crash	70	112740
32	98	Paul Menard	Ford	Yates Racing	363	0	running	67	109506
33	7	Robby Gordon	Toyota	Robby Gordon Motorsports	282	0	crash	64	98660
34	34	John Andretti	Chevrolet	Front Row Motorsports	253	0	crash	61	86750
35	55	Michael Waltrip	Toyota	Michael Waltrip Racing	250	0	engine	58	86525
36	11	Denny Hamlin	Toyota	Joe Gibbs Racing	232	0	crash	55	96400
37	82	Scott Speed	Toyota	Red Bull Racing Team	118	0	engine	52	90328
38	87	Joe Nemechek	Toyota	NEMCO Motorsports	67	0	drive shaft	49	78145
39	66	Dave Blaney	Toyota	Prism Motorsports	66	0	transmission	46	78030
40	09	Mike Bliss	Dodge	Phoenix Racing	56	0	electrical	43	77900
41	36	Mike Skinner	Toyota	Tommy Baldwin Racing	51	0	engine	40	77745
42	37	Tony Raines	Chevrolet	Front Row Motorsports	42	0	crash	37	77665
43	71	David Gilliland	Chevrolet	TRG Motorsports	38	1	power	39	78034

Previous race: 2009 Coca-Cola 600	Sprint Cup Series; 2009 season	Next race: 2009 Pocono 500
