= 2007 in NASCAR =

There were three NASCAR national series in 2007:

- 2007 NASCAR Nextel Cup Series - The top racing series in NASCAR
- 2007 NASCAR Busch Series - The second-highest racing series in NASCAR
- 2007 NASCAR Craftsman Truck Series - The third-highest racing series in NASCAR

Preceded by 2006 in NASCAR	NASCAR seasons 2007	Succeeded by 2008 in NASCAR
