= 2006 in NASCAR =

In 2006 in NASCAR, the National Association for Stock Car Auto Racing (NASCAR) sanctioned three national touring series, eight regional touring series, and the Dodge Weekly Series for local competition. NASCAR champions in 2006 were Jimmie Johnson, Kevin Harvick, Todd Bodine, Eric Holmes, Mike Olsen, Mike Stefanik, Junior Miller, Tim Schendel, Gary Lewis, J. R. Norris, Rip Michels, and Philip Morris.

== National touring series ==
=== Nextel Cup Series ===
==== Top ten drivers standings ====
Pos.	Driver	Car	Manufacturer	Owner	Pts	Starts	Wins	Top 5	Top 10	Winnings
1	Jimmie Johnson	48	Chevrolet	Hendrick Motorsports	6475	36	5	13	24	$15,875,125
2	Matt Kenseth	17	Ford	Roush Racing	6419	36	4	15	21	$9,544,966
3	Denny Hamlin	11	Chevrolet	Joe Gibbs Racing	6407	36	2	8	20	$6,607,932
4	Kevin Harvick	29	Chevrolet	Richard Childress Racing	6397	36	5	15	20	$8,231,406
5	Dale Earnhardt Jr.	8	Chevrolet	Dale Earnhardt, Inc.	6328	36	1	10	17	$7,111,739
6	Jeff Gordon	24	Chevrolet	Hendrick Motorsports	6256	36	2	14	18	$7,471,447
7	Jeff Burton	31	Chevrolet	Richard Childress Racing	6228	36	1	7	20	$6,439,995
8	Kasey Kahne	9	Dodge	Evernham Motorsports	6183	36	6	12	19	$7,721,378
9	Mark Martin	6	Ford	Roush Racing	6168	36	0	7	15	$5,568,748
10	Kyle Busch	5	Chevrolet	Hendrick Motorsports	6027	36	1	10	18	$6,077,337

=== Busch Series ===
==== Top ten drivers standings ====
Pos.	Driver	Car	Manufacturer	Owner	Pts	Starts	Wins	Top 5	Top 10	Winnings
1	Kevin Harvick	21; 29; 33	Chevrolet	Richard Childress Racing; Richard Childress Racing; Kevin Harvick, Inc.	5648	35	9	23	32	$2,850,864
2	Carl Edwards	60	Ford	Roush Racing	4824	35	4	15	25	$1,878,844
3	Clint Bowyer	2	Chevrolet	Richard Childress Racing	4683	35	1	12	17	$1,715,649
4	Denny Hamlin	20	Chevrolet	Joe Gibbs Racing	4667	35	2	12	23	$1,757,309
5	J. J. Yeley	18	Chevrolet	Joe Gibbs Racing	4487	35	0	9	22	$1,504,366
6	Paul Menard	11	Chevrolet	Dale Earnhardt, Inc.	4075	35	1	7	16	$1,723,218
7	Kyle Busch	5	Chevrolet	Hendrick Motorsports	3921	34	1	4	12	$1,182,182
8	Johnny Sauter	00	Chevrolet	Haas CNC Racing	3794	35	0	2	9	$1,561,164
9	Greg Biffle	16; 66	Chevrolet	Roush Racing; Brewco Motorsports	3789	30	1	9	18	$928,356
10	Reed Sorenson	41	Dodge	Chip Ganassi Racing	3670	34	0	5	14	$1,068,468

=== Craftsman Truck Series ===
==== Top ten drivers standings ====
Pos.	Driver	Car	Manufacturer	Owner	Pts	Starts	Wins	Top 5	Top 10	Winnings
1	Todd Bodine	30	Toyota	Germain Racing	3666	25	3	12	16	$1,046,680
2	Johnny Benson Jr.	23	Toyota	Bill Davis Racing	3539	25	5	13	17	$770,157
3	David Reutimann	17	Toyota	Darrell Waltrip Motorsports	3530	25	0	7	19	$525,531
4	David Starr	11	Toyota	Red Horse Racing	3355	25	1	6	12	$515,985
5	Jack Sprague	60	Toyota	Wyler Racing	3328	25	2	10	14	$586,879
6	Ted Musgrave	9	Toyota	Germain Racing	3314	25	0	10	13	$560,083
7	Ron Hornaday Jr.	33	Chevrolet	Kevin Harvick, Inc.	3313	25	2	8	12	$544,667
8	Terry Cook	10	Ford	ppc Racing	3265	25	1	3	12	$483,630
9	Rick Crawford	14	Ford	Circle Bar Racing	3252	25	1	5	13	$508,602
10	Mike Skinner	5	Toyota	Bill Davis Racing	3219	25	1	8	13	$568,353

== Regional touring series ==
=== AutoZone West Series ===
==== Top ten drivers standings ====
Pos.	Driver	Car	Manufacturer	Owner	Pts	Starts	Wins	Top 5	Top 10	Winnings
1	Eric Holmes	62; 35	Chevrolet; Ford	Beebe Racing Enterprises; NDS Motorsports	1889	12	1	9	10	$225,149
2	Michael David	2	Ford	Bennett Lane Race Team	1806	12	2	6	9	$180,627
3	Mike Duncan	9	Chevrolet	MB Duncan Motorsports	1762	12	1	3	8	$141,498
4	Steve Portenga	77	Ford	Performance P-1 Motorsports	1720	12	0	4	10	$127,016
5	Peyton Sellers	16	Chevrolet	Bill McAnally Racing	1675	12	1	6	6	$135,565
6	Jim Inglebright	1	Chevrolet	Inglebright Racing	1657	12	0	3	7	$112,418
7	Scott Gaylord	00	Chevrolet	Oliver Racing	1644	12	0	3	9	$97,379
8	Austin Cameron	88	Chevrolet	MRG Motorsports	1631	12	2	4	6	$92,258
9	Brian Ickler	20	Chevrolet	Bill McAnally Racing	1591	12	0	2	6	$80,877
10	Johnny Borneman III	8	Ford	Borneman Motorsports	1569	12	1	5	5	$88,443

Preceded by 2005 in NASCAR	NASCAR seasons 2006	Succeeded by 2007 in NASCAR
