= Tony Hirschman Jr. =

American racing driver

- Born: May 3, 1956 (age 70); Northampton, Pennsylvania, U.S.

NASCAR O'Reilly Auto Parts Series career
- 7 races run over 2 years
- Best finish: 58th (1991)
- First race: 1991 Pontiac 200 (Nazareth)
- Last race: 1992 Budweiser 300 (New Hampshire)
| Wins | Top tens | Poles |
|---|---|---|
| 0 | 0 | 0 |

ARCA Menards Series East career
- 47 races run over 4 years
- Best finish: 7th (1991)
- First race: 1991 New Hampshire Lottery Twin 125's (New Hampshire)
- Last race: 1998 Gumont Long Life Formula 100 (New Hampshire)
- First win: 1992 Diet Coke 150 (Oxford)
| Wins | Top tens | Poles |
|---|---|---|
| 1 | 22 | 1 |
- Statistics up to date as of July 6, 2024.

Tony Hirschman Jr. (born May 3, 1956) is an American former professional stock car racing driver who previously competed in the NASCAR Whelen Modified Tour, NASCAR Busch Series, and NASCAR Busch North Series. He has also competed in the Race of Champions Asphalt Modified Tour and the World Series of Asphalt Stock Car Racing.

Hirschman was a long-time competitor in the Modified Tour, having competed in the series from 1985 to 2007, where he won five championships in 1995, 1996, 1999, 2004, and 2005, and earned 35 race wins.

Hirschman is the father of both fellow driver Matt Hirschman, who currently competes part time in the Modified Tour, and current NASCAR Cup Series spotter Tony Hirschman III.

== Motorsports results ==
=== NASCAR ===
(key) (Bold – Pole position awarded by qualifying time. Italics – Pole position earned by points standings or practice time. * – Most laps led.)

==== Busch Series ====
NASCAR Busch Series results
| Year | Team | No. | Make | 1 | 2 | 3 | 4 | 5 | 6 | 7 | 8 | 9 | 10 | 11 | 12 | 13 | 14 | 15 | 16 | 17 | 18 | 19 | 20 | 21 | 22 | 23 | 24 | 25 | 26 | 27 | 28 | 29 | 30 | 31 | NBSC | Pts | Ref |
|---|---|---|---|---|---|---|---|---|---|---|---|---|---|---|---|---|---|---|---|---|---|---|---|---|---|---|---|---|---|---|---|---|---|---|---|---|---|
| 1991 | Tony Vecchio | 1 | Olds | DAY | RCH; Wth | CAR | MAR | VOL | HCY | DAR | BRI | LAN | SBO | | | | | | | | | | | | | | | | | | | | | | 58th | 355 | |
| 1991 | Tony Vecchio | 11 | Olds | | | | | | | | | | | NZH; 28 | CLT | DOV | ROU | HCY | MYB | GLN | | | | | | | | | | | | | | | 58th | 355 | |
| 1991 | Tony Vecchio | 3 | Olds | | | | | | | | | | | | | | | | | | OXF; 11 | | | | | | | | | | | NHA; 16 | CAR | MAR | 58th | 355 | |
| 1991 | Tony Vecchio | 18 | Olds | | | | | | | | | | | | | | | | | | | NHA; 44 | SBO | DUB | IRP | ROU | BRI | DAR | RCH | DOV | CLT | | | | 58th | 355 | |
| 1992 | Tony Vecchio | 4 | Olds | DAY | CAR | RCH; 32 | ATL | MAR | DAR | BRI | HCY | LAN | DUB | | | | | | | | | | | | | | | | | | | | | | 83rd | 174 | |
| 1992 | Tony Vecchio | 11 | Olds | | | | | | | | | | | NZH; 32 | CLT | DOV | ROU | MYB | GLN | VOL | | | | | | | | | | | | | | | 83rd | 174 | |
| 1992 | Tony Vecchio | 1 | Olds | | | | | | | | | | | | | | | | | | NHA; 41 | TAL | IRP | ROU | MCH | NHA | BRI | DAR | RCH | DOV | CLT | MAR | CAR | HCY | 83rd | 174 | |

==== Whelen Modified Tour ====
NASCAR Whelen Modified Tour results
| Year | Team | No. | Make | 1 | 2 | 3 | 4 | 5 | 6 | 7 | 8 | 9 | 10 | 11 | 12 | 13 | 14 | 15 | 16 | 17 | 18 | 19 | 20 | 21 | 22 | 23 | 24 | 25 | 26 | 27 | 28 | 29 | NWMTC | Pts | Ref |
|---|---|---|---|---|---|---|---|---|---|---|---|---|---|---|---|---|---|---|---|---|---|---|---|---|---|---|---|---|---|---|---|---|---|---|---|
| 1985 | N/A | 6 | Chevy | TMP | MAR | STA | MAR | NEG | WFD | NEG | SPE | RIV | CLA | STA | TMP | NEG | HOL | HOL | RIV | CAT | EPP | TMP | WFD | RIV | STA | TMP | POC; 22 | TIO | OXF | STA | TMP | | N/A | 0 | |
| 1985 | N/A | 8 | Chevy | | | | | | | | | | | | | | | | | | | | | | | | | | | | | MAR; 7 | N/A | 0 | |
| 1986 | N/A | U2 | Chevy | ROU | MAR | STA; 13 | TMP | MAR | NEG | MND | EPP | NEG | WFD | | | | | | | | | | | | | | | | | | | | 45th | 331 | |
| 1986 | N/A | 1 | Chevy | | | | | | | | | | | SPE; 5 | RIV | NEG | TMP | RIV | TMP | RIV | STA | TMP | POC; 37 | TIO | OXF | STA | TMP | MAR | | | | | 45th | 331 | |
| 1987 | N/A | 28 | Chevy | ROU | MAR; 4 | TMP; 21 | STA; 16 | CNB; 5 | STA; 7 | | | | | | | | | | | | | | | | | | | | | | | | 20th | 1361 | |
| 1987 | N/A | 28 | Pontiac | | | | | | | MND; 10 | WFD | JEN | SPE | RIV | TMP | RPS | EPP | RIV | STA | TMP | RIV | SEE | STA | | | | | | | | | | 20th | 1361 | |
| 1987 | N/A | 17 | Chevy | | | | | | | | | | | | | | | | | | | | | POC; 26 | TIO; 2 | TMP | OXF | TMP | | | | | 20th | 1361 | |
| 1987 | N/A | 1 | Chevy | | | | | | | | | | | | | | | | | | | | | | | | | | ROU; 22 | | STA; 6 | | 20th | 1361 | |
| 1987 | N/A | 6 | Chevy | | | | | | | | | | | | | | | | | | | | | | | | | | | MAR; 7 | | | 20th | 1361 | |
| 1988 | N/A | 28 | N/A | ROU | MAR | TMP | MAR | JEN | IRP | MND | OSW; 3 | | | | | | | | | | | | | | | | | | | | | | 29th | 937 | |
| 1988 | N/A | 87 | N/A | | | | | | | | | OSW; 4 | RIV | JEN | RPS | TMP | RIV | OSW; 5 | TMP | OXF | OSW | TMP | POC; 14 | | | | | | | | | | 29th | 937 | |
| 1988 | N/A | 1 | Chevy | | | | | | | | | | | | | | | | | | | | | TIO; 4 | TMP | ROU | MAR; 15 | | | | | | 29th | 937 | |
| 1989 | Tony Vecchio | 1 | Chevy | **MAR**; 22 | TMP; 2 | MAR; 3 | JEN; 18 | STA; 8 | IRP; 2 | OSW; 1* | WFD; 4 | | RIV; 18 | OSW; 1 | JEN; 1* | STA; 5 | **RPS**; 12 | RIV; 3 | OSW; 16 | TMP; 2 | TMP; 3 | RIV; 17 | OSW; 1** | TMP; 4 | POC; 1* | STA; 2 | TIO; 19 | MAR; 3 | TMP; 1** | | | | 3rd | 3921 | |
| 1989 | RS Racing | 0 | Pontiac | | | | | | | | | MND; 18 | | | | | | | | | | | | | | | | | | | | | 3rd | 3921 | |
| 1990 | Tony Vecchio | 1 | Chevy | MAR; 24 | RCH; 1 | TMP; 18 | STA; 9 | MAR; 30 | TMP; 5 | STA; 3 | MND; 13 | HOL; 1* | STA; 4 | RIV; 10 | JEN; 2 | EPP; 1 | RPS; 6 | RIV; 11 | TMP; 5 | RPS; 19 | NHA; 11 | TMP; 3 | POC; 43 | STA; 11 | TMP; 24 | **MAR**; 1* | | | | | | | 5th | 3130 | |
| 1991 | Tony Vecchio | 1 | Chevy | MAR | RCH; 6 | TMP | NHA; 7 | MAR | NZH; 24 | STA | TMP | FLE | OXF | RIV | JEN | STA | RPS | RIV | RCH; 33 | TMP | NHA | TMP | POC | STA | TMP | MAR | | | | | | | 39th | 454 | |
| 1993 | N/A | 3 | Chevy | RCH | STA | TMP | NHA | NZH | STA | RIV | NHA | RPS | HOL | LEE | RIV | STA | TMP | TMP | STA | TMP; 9 | | | | | | | | | | | | | N/A | 0 | |
| 1994 | Mario Fiore | 44 | Pontiac | NHA; 31 | STA; 6 | TMP; 12 | NZH; 35 | STA; 16 | LEE; 20 | TMP; 32 | RIV; 4 | TIO | NHA | RPS | HOL | TMP | RIV | NHA | STA | SPE | TMP | NHA | STA | TMP | | | | | | | | | 32nd | 850 | |
| 1995 | Len Boehler | 3 | Chevy | **TMP**; 2 | NHA; 3 | STA; 19 | NZH; 1 | STA; 9 | LEE; 2 | TMP; 2 | RIV; 9 | BEE; 8 | NHA; 2 | JEN; 4 | **RPS**; 11 | HOL; 25 | RIV; 17 | NHA; 2 | STA; 9 | TMP; 27 | NHA; 6 | STA; 8 | TMP; 5 | TMP; 7 | | | | | | | | | 1st | 3022 | |
| 1996 | Len Boehler | 3 | Chevy | TMP; 4 | STA; 3 | NZH; 2 | STA; 3 | NHA; 1 | JEN; 3 | RIV; 3 | LEE; 7 | RPS; 24 | HOL; 12 | TMP; 28 | RIV; 5 | NHA; 1 | GLN; 3 | STA; 6 | NHA; 2 | NHA; 1 | STA; 27 | **FLE**; 22 | TMP; 12 | | | | | | | | | | 1st | 2919 | |
| 1997 | Len Boehler | 3 | Chevy | TMP; 2 | MAR; 21 | STA; 25 | NZH; 33 | STA; 2 | NHA; 7 | FLE; 13 | JEN; 5 | RIV; 17 | GLN; 21 | NHA; 5 | RPS; 7 | HOL; 10 | TMP; 7 | RIV; 11 | NHA; 7 | **GLN**; 7 | STA; 21 | NHA; 14 | STA; 4 | FLE; 3 | TMP; 2 | **RCH**; 2 | | | | | | | 4th | 3118 | |
| 1998 | Len Boehler | 3 | Chevy | RPS; 2 | TMP; 2 | MAR; 21 | STA; 14 | NZH; 9 | **STA**; 10 | GLN; 16 | JEN; 7 | **RIV**; 18 | **NHA**; 4 | NHA; 10 | LEE; 20 | HOL; 9 | TMP; 7 | NHA; 25 | RIV; 16 | STA; 25 | NHA; 3 | TMP; 20 | STA; 9 | TMP; 7 | FLE; 5 | | | | | | | | 7th | 2882 | |
| 1999 | Gary Cretty | 25 | Pontiac | TMP; 7 | RPS; 8 | STA; 4 | RCH; 11 | STA; 9 | RIV; 7 | JEN; 1* | | **NZH**; 3 | HOL; 2 | TMP; 3 | | RIV; 5 | GLN; 2 | STA; 12 | RPS; 4 | TMP; 1 | **NHA**; 1 | STA; 1 | | | | | | | | | | | 1st | 3361 | |
| 1999 | Gary Cretty | 25 | Chevy | | | | | | | | NHA; 1 | | | | NHA; 1* | | | | | | | | | | | | | | | | | | 1st | 3361 | |
| 1999 | Gary Cretty | 25 | Dodge | | | | | | | | | | | | | | | | | | | | MAR; 8 | TMP; 3 | | | | | | | | | 1st | 3361 | |
| 2000 | Gary Cretty | 25 | Dodge | STA; 27 | RCH; 2 | STA; 3 | RIV; 25 | SEE; 5 | NHA; 36 | **NZH**; 6 | TMP; 7 | RIV; 7 | GLN; DNQ | | | | | | | | | | | | | | | | | | | | 12th | 1969 | |
| 2000 | N/A | 00 | Chevy | | | | | | | | | | | TMP; 27 | STA; 26 | WFD; 24 | | | | | | | | | | | | | | | | | 12th | 1969 | |
| 2000 | N/A | 72 | Chevy | | | | | | | | | | | | | | NHA; 16 | | | | | | | | | | | | | | | | 12th | 1969 | |
| 2000 | N/A | 11 | Chevy | | | | | | | | | | | | | | | STA; 8 | MAR; 22 | TMP; 4 | | | | | | | | | | | | | 12th | 1969 | |
| 2001 | N/A | 11 | Chevy | SBO; 22 | TMP; 33 | STA; 5 | WFD; 33 | | | | | | | | | | | | | | | | | | | | | | | | | | 10th | 2397 | |
| 2001 | N/A | 89 | Chevy | | | | | NZH; 38 | | | | | | | | | | | | | | | | | | | | | | | | | 10th | 2397 | |
| 2001 | Bob & Tom Kehley | 48 | Chevy | | | | | | STA; 16 | | | RCH; 1* | NHA; 1 | HOL; 5 | RIV; 17 | CHE; 22 | TMP; 1 | STA; 11 | WFD; 10 | TMP; 32 | STA; 14 | MAR; 23 | TMP; 5 | | | | | | | | | | 10th | 2397 | |
| 2001 | N/A | 80 | Chevy | | | | | | | RIV; 8 | SEE; 24 | | | | | | | | | | | | | | | | | | | | | | 10th | 2397 | |
| 2002 | Bob & Tom Kehley | 48 | Chevy | TMP; 5 | STA; 3 | WFD; 30 | NZH; 3 | RIV; 27 | SEE; 30 | RCH | STA | BEE | NHA | RIV | TMP | STA | WFD | **TMP**; 12 | NHA; 5 | STA; 30 | MAR; 30 | TMP; 28 | | | | | | | | | | | 26th | 1287 | |
| 2003 | Bob & Tom Kehley | 48 | Chevy | **TMP**; 11 | | WFD; 9 | NZH; 13 | STA; 26 | LER; 27 | BLL; 14 | BEE; 2 | NHA; 36 | **ADI**; 6* | RIV; 28 | TMP; 13 | STA; 6 | WFD; 6 | **TMP**; 1 | **NHA**; 6 | STA; 2 | **TMP**; 1* | | | | | | | | | | | | 6th | 2403 | |
| 2003 | Bob & Tom Kehley | 49 | Chevy | | STA; 3 | | | | | | | | | | | | | | | | | | | | | | | | | | | | 6th | 2403 | |
| 2004 | Bob & Tom Kehley | 48 | Chevy | **TMP**; 5 | STA; 2 | WFD; 3 | NZH; 25 | **STA**; 1 | RIV; 6 | LER; 1* | WAL; 17 | BEE; 8 | NHA; 4 | SEE; 10 | RIV; 10 | STA; 2 | TMP; 1* | WFD; 5 | TMP; 11 | NHA; 3 | STA; 1* | **TMP**; 3 | | | | | | | | | | | 1st | 2915 | |
| 2005 | Bob & Tom Kehley | 48 | Chevy | TMP; 11 | STA; 1* | RIV; 9 | **WFD**; 12 | STA; 24 | **JEN**; 1* | NHA; 2 | **BEE**; 2 | SEE; 4 | RIV; 2 | **STA**; 1 | **TMP**; 1 | **WFD**; 21 | MAR; 7 | **TMP**; 2* | NHA; 6 | STA; 1* | TMP; 12 | | | | | | | | | | | | 1st | 2749 | |
| 2006 | Bob & Tom Kehley | 48 | Chevy | TMP; 5 | STA; 9 | JEN; 2 | TMP; 5 | STA; 7 | NHA; 11 | HOL; 1* | RIV; 20 | **STA**; 21 | **TMP**; 2 | MAR; 19 | TMP; 33 | NHA; 10 | WFD; 18 | TMP; 6 | STA; 4 | | | | | | | | | | | | | | 4th | 2170 | |
| 2007 | Bob & Tom Kehley | 48 | Chevy | TMP; 31 | STA; 6 | WTO | **STA**; 24 | TMP; 4 | NHA; 16 | TSA | RIV | **STA**; 12 | TMP; 2 | MAN; 11 | MAR | NHA; 7 | TMP; 36 | STA; 2 | TMP; 9 | | | | | | | | | | | | | | 21st | 1522 | |

Sporting positions
| Preceded by Wayne Anderson | NASCAR Featherlite Modified Tour Champion; 1995 | Succeeded by Tony Hirschman Jr. |
| Preceded by Tony Hirschman Jr. | NASCAR Featherlite Modified Tour Champion; 1996 | Succeeded by Mike Stefanik |
| Preceded by Mike Stefanik | NASCAR Featherlite Modified Tour Champion; 1999 | Succeeded by Jerry Marquis |
| Preceded by Todd Szegedy | NASCAR Featherlite Modified Tour Champion; 2004 | Succeeded by Tony Hirschman Jr. |
| Preceded by Tony Hirschman Jr. | NASCAR Whelen Modified Tour Champion; 2005 | Succeeded by Mike Stefanik |
