= Mike Stefanik =

American racing driver (1958–2019)

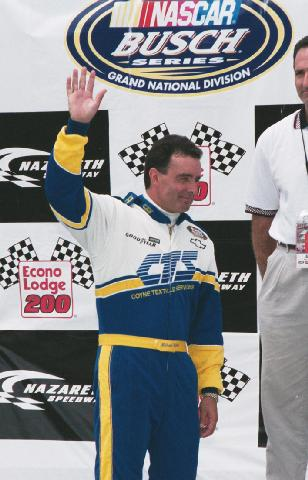
- Stefanik at Nazareth Speedway in 2000
- Born: Michael Paul Stefanik; May 20, 1958; Springfield, Massachusetts, U.S.
- Died: September 15, 2019 (aged 61); Providence, Rhode Island, U.S.
- Achievements: 1989, 1991, 1997, 1998, 2001, 2002, 2006 Whelen Modified Tour Champion; 1997, 1998 Busch North Series Champion
- Awards: 1999 Craftsman Truck Series Rookie of the Year; 1997, 1998, 2001 Featherlite Modified Series Most Popular Driver; 1995, 1997, 1998, 2004 Busch North Series Most Popular Driver; Named one of the "NASCAR Modified All-Time Top 10 Drivers" (2003); NASCAR Hall of Fame (2022); Named one of NASCAR's 75 Greatest Drivers (2023)

NASCAR O'Reilly Auto Parts Series career
- 26 races run over 9 years
- Best finish: 56th (2000)
- First race: 1992 Budweiser 300 (Loudon)
- Last race: 2000 Miami 300 (Homestead)
Wins	Top tens	Poles
0	1	0

NASCAR FedEx Freight Truck Series career
- 26 races run over 2 years
- Best finish: 13th (1999)
- First race: 1998 Sam's Town 250 (Las Vegas)
- Last race: 1999 NAPA Auto Parts 200 (Fontana)
Wins	Top tens	Poles
0	10	0
- Statistics up to date as of September 15, 2019.

Michael Paul Stefanik (May 20, 1958 – September 15, 2019) was an American professional stock car racing driver. He competed mainly in the NASCAR Whelen Modified Tour, but also made appearances in the Busch Grand National series and the Craftsman Truck Series. A seven-time champion in the Modified series, Stefanik was named the second greatest NASCAR Modified driver of all-time in 2003. His nine total championships (two in the Busch North Series) tie him with Richie Evans for the most in NASCAR history. Stefanik is a member of the 2021 NASCAR Hall of Fame class.

== Racing career ==
=== Whelen Modified Series ===
Stefanik ran his first full Whelen Modified Tour season in 1987. He recorded his first championship in 1989, winning in seven of his 26 starts. He continued to be a major player in the 1990s, winning the 1991 series championship, finishing out of the top ten just once that season. After not running a complete schedule for a few years, Stefanik finished fifth in 1995 and won the 1997 and 1998 titles while simultaneously racing full-time and winning the championship those same years in the Busch North Series. Taking the 2000 season off to run full-time in the Camping World Truck Series, Stefanik won the championship his first two years back, not winning too many races but consistently placing in the top-ten. Again pursuing other interests (this time K&N series), Stefanik did not contend in 2003, 2004, or 2005 but won the 2006 season opener, completed every lap that season and only was out of first place for one week, winning the championship. Steadily trending downward from there, Stefanik's first full winless season came in 2010. He won his last race at Bristol Motor Speedway in 2013, and started his last race in 2014.

In 2013, Stefanik competed in the inaugural UNOH Battle at the Beach at Daytona International Speedway. On the final lap, he was leading until contact with Steve Park sent him spinning; he finished 13th in the race. Afterwards, when Speed reporter Ray Dunlap arrived to interview him, Stefanik angrily stated he is "that freaking pissed. This is just bullshit." The interview was subsequently aired on The Jay Leno Show.

=== K&N Pro Series East ===
Stefanik won in only his third start, which came in 1991. He ran his first full season in 1993 while racing Modifieds and won the 1997 and 1998 championships, pocketing over $100,000 for each season. In doing so, he became the first driver to win two NASCAR championships in consecutive years; Lee Petty is the only other person to have won two championships in one year. Stefanik raced full seasons in 2003, 2004 and 2005 while stepping away from Modifieds, but did not have the same amount of success.

=== Craftsman Truck Series ===
Stefanik moved up to the Craftsman Truck Series, racing for Phelon Motorsports and finishing in the top ten nine times during 1999, achieving Rookie of the Year honors.

=== Halls of Fame ===
Stefanik was elected to the New England Auto Racers Hall of Fame in his first year of eligibility. He was inducted Nov. 11, 2018 by writer Mark "Bones" Bourcier. In 2013, Michael accepted his late brother Bob's induction. Bob and Michael are the fifth pair of brothers enshrined in the NEAR Hall.

Stefanik was first nominated to the NASCAR Hall of Fame in 2015, and was elected to the Hall in 2022.

== Death ==
According to Connecticut State Police, on the afternoon of September 15, 2019, Stefanik took off in a friend's Aero-Works Aerolite 103 from Riconn Airport (Greene, Rhode Island), and was headed back when it experienced mechanical problems causing it to lose power and crash in a wooded area in Sterling, Connecticut. He was airlifted to Rhode Island Hospital, where he died from his injuries.

== Motorsports career results ==
=== NASCAR ===
(key) (Bold – Pole position awarded by qualifying time. Italics – Pole position earned by points standings or practice time. * – Most laps led. ** – All laps led.)

==== Busch Series ====
NASCAR Busch Series results
Year	Team	No.	Make	1	2	3	4	5	6	7	8	9	10	11	12	13	14	15	16	17	18	19	20	21	22	23	24	25	26	27	28	29	30	31	32	NBGNC	Pts	Ref
1992		74	Chevy	DAY	CAR	RCH	ATL	MAR	DAR	BRI	HCY	LAN	DUB	NZH	CLT	DOV	ROU	MYB	GLN	VOL	NHA; 8	TAL	IRP	ROU	MCH											67th	260	
1992		14	Chevy																							NHA; 15	BRI	DAR	RCH	DOV	CLT	MAR	CAR	HCY		67th	260	
1993	Ling Racing Enterprises	6	Pontiac	DAY	CAR	RCH	DAR	BRI	HCY	ROU	MAR	NZH; 15	CLT	DOV	MYB	GLN; 29	MLW	TAL	IRP	MCH	NHA; 39	BRI	DAR	RCH	DOV	ROU	CLT	MAR	CAR	HCY	ATL					NC^{2}	0	
1994	Rexrode Galiano Motorsports	1	Ford	DAY; 44	CAR	RCH; 33	ATL; DNQ	MAR	DAR	HCY	BRI	ROU																								73rd	192	
1994		11	Chevy										NHA; 41																							73rd	192	
1994		14	Chevy											NZH; 16	CLT	DOV	MYB	GLN	MLW	SBO	TAL	HCY	IRP	MCH	BRI	DAR										73rd	192	
1994		1	Chevy																								RCH; 22	DOV	CLT	MAR	CAR					73rd	192	
1995	Mountain Racing	09	Chevy	DAY	CAR	RCH	ATL	NSV	DAR	BRI	HCY	NHA; 41	NZH; 41	CLT	DOV	MYB	GLN	MLW	TAL	SBO	IRP	MCH	BRI	DAR	RCH	DOV	CLT	CAR	HOM							NC^{2}	0	
1996	H & H Motorsports	51	Chevy	DAY	CAR	RCH	ATL	NSV	DAR	BRI	HCY	NZH; 14	CLT	DOV	SBO	MYB	GLN	MLW	NHA	TAL	IRP	MCH	BRI	DAR	RCH	DOV	CLT	CAR	HOM							NC^{2}	0	
1997	H & H Motorsports	51	Chevy	DAY	CAR	RCH	ATL	LVS	DAR	HCY	TEX	BRI	NSV	TAL	NHA	NZH; 33	CLT	DOV	SBO	GLN	MLW	MYB	GTY	IRP	MCH	BRI	DAR	RCH	DOV	CLT	CAL	CAR	HOM			NC^{2}	0	
1998	Andretti-Laird Racing	96	Pontiac	DAY	CAR; 35	LVS; 32	NSV; DNQ	DAR; DNQ	BRI	TEX	HCY	TAL	NHA																							92nd	125	
1998	H & H Motorsports	51	Chevy											NZH; 39	CLT	DOV	RCH	PPR	GLN	MLW	MYB	CAL	SBO	IRP	MCH	BRI	DAR	RCH	DOV	CLT	GTY	CAR	ATL	HOM		92nd	125	
1999	Prime Performance Motorsports	05	Chevy	DAY; DNQ	CAR; 22	LVS	ATL	DAR	TEX	NSV	BRI	TAL	CAL	NHA	RCH	NZH	CLT	DOV	SBO	GLN	MLW	MYB	PPR	GTY	IRP	MCH	BRI	DAR	RCH	DOV	CLT	CAR	MEM	PHO	HOM	109th	102	
2000	GTS Motorsports	90	Chevy	DAY	CAR; DNQ	LVS	ATL	DAR; 23	BRI; 20	TEX	NSV	TAL	CAL	RCH; DNQ	NHA	CLT; 39	DOV; DNQ	SBO	MYB	GLN; 31	MLW	NZH; 13	PPR	GTY	IRP	MCH	BRI; 20	DAR; DNQ	RCH; DNQ	DOV; 41	CLT; DNQ	CAR; DNQ	MEM; DNQ	PHO	HOM; 18	56th	689	

^{2} Competed only in companion events with Busch North Series as BNS driver and ineligible for Busch Series points

==== Craftsman Truck Series ====
NASCAR Craftsman Truck Series results
Year	Team	No.	Make	1	2	3	4	5	6	7	8	9	10	11	12	13	14	15	16	17	18	19	20	21	22	23	24	25	26	27	NCTC	Pts	Ref
1998	Phelon Motorsports	66	Ford	WDW	HOM	PHO	POR	EVG	I70	GLN	TEX	BRI	MLW	NZH	CAL	PPR	IRP	NHA	FLM	NSV	HPT	LVL	RCH	MEM	GTY	MAR	SON	MMR	PHO	LVS; 8	49th	142	
1999	Phelon Motorsports	66	Ford	HOM; 2	PHO; 13	EVG; 24	MMR; 14	MAR; 12	MEM; 11	PPR; 11	I70; 7	BRI; 22	TEX; 28	PIR; 13	GLN; 11	MLW; 13	NSV; 8	NZH; 8	MCH; 7	NHA; 13	IRP; 16	GTY; 6	HPT; 10	RCH; 16	LVS; 32	LVL; 9	TEX; 31	CAL; 9			13th	3074	

==== Busch North Series ====
NASCAR Busch North Series results
Year	Team	No.	Make	1	2	3	4	5	6	7	8	9	10	11	12	13	14	15	16	17	18	19	20	21	22	23	24	NBNSC	Pts	Ref
1991	Pearson Racing Enterprises	20	Pontiac	DAY	RCH	CAR	NHA	OXF	NZH	MND; 26	OXF	TMP; 19	HOL	JEN	EPP	STA; 1*	OXF	NHA	FLE	OXF	TMP; 24	NHA; 10	RPS; 3	TMP	DOV	EPP	NHA	29th	808	
1992	Auto Palace	14	Chevy	DAY	CAR	RCH	NHA; 16	NZH	MND	OXF	DOV	LEE	JEN	OXF					NHA; 15			NHA; 9	EPP					31st	601	
1992	Auto Palace	74	Chevy												NHA; 8	OXF	HOL	EPP										31st	601	
1992	Auto Palace	88	Pontiac																	RPS; 25	OXF							31st	601	
1993	Don Ling Sr.	6	Pontiac	LEE; 10	NHA; 22	MND; 13	NZH; 15	HOL; 15	GLN; 17	JEN; 27	STA; 28	GLN; 29	NHA; 17	WIS; 9	NHA; 3	NHA; 39	RPS; 9	TMP; 12*	WMM; 12	LEE; 8	EPP; 16	LRP; 8						9th	1991	
1994	Mike Greci	51	Chevy	NHA; 2																								24th	1315	
1994	Auto Palace	11	Chevy		NHA; 41	MND																						24th	1315	
1994	Auto Palace	14	Chevy				NZH; 16	SPE	HOL	GLN; 31	JEN	EPP	GLN	NHA; 35	WIS	STA; 3	TMP; 17	MND; 9	WMM	RPS; 7	LEE	NHA; 5	LRP; 7					24th	1315	
1995	Allen Avery	09	Olds	DAY	NHA; 1	LEE; DNQ	JEN; 7			HOL; 23	BEE; 9	TMP; 5	GLN	NHA; 8	TIO; 5	MND; 2	GLN; 8	EPP; 13	RPS; 1*	LEE; 4	STA; 18	BEE; 9	NHA; 5	TMP; 1	LRP; 20			2nd	2621	
1995	Kennedy Racing	00	Olds			LEE; 6																						2nd	2621	
1995	Allen Avery	09	Chevy					NHA; 41	NZH; 41																			2nd	2621	
1996	Mike Greci	51	Chevy	DAY	LEE; 6	JEN; 5	NZH; 14	HOL; 12	NHA; 22	**TIO**; 19	BEE; 3	TMP; 2	NZH; 15	NHA; 23	STA; 28	GLN; 4	EPP; 19	RPS; 3	LEE; 15	**NHA**; 39	NHA; 5	BEE; 17	TMP; 2*	LRP; 5				6th	2523	
1997	Mike Greci	51	Chevy	DAY	LEE; 5	JEN; 12	NHA; 5	NZH; 33	HOL; 2*	NHA; 3	STA; 5	BEE; 2	TMP; 5	NZH; 3*	TIO; 2	NHA; 12	STA; 8	THU; 16	**GLN**; 37	EPP; 1	RPS; 2*	BEE; 2	TMP; 1*	NHA; 4	LRP; 9			1st	3033	
1998	Mike Greci	51	Chevy	LEE; 2*	RPS; 5	NHA; 18	NZH; 39	HOL; 4	GLN	STA; 4	NHA; 7	DOV; 29	STA; 1*	NHA; 4	GLN; 10	EPP; 8	JEN; 1	NHA; 8	THU; 7	TMP; 1	BEE; 10	LRP; 1*						1st	2554	
2001	Team Goewey	20	Chevy	LEE	NHA	SEE	HOL	BEE	EPP	STA	WFD	BEE	TMP	NHA; 14	STA	SEE	GLN	NZH	THU	BEE	DOV	STA	LRP					67th	121	
2003	Grizco Racing	55	Chevy	LEE; 5	STA; 11	ERI; 3*	BEE; 4	STA; 11	**HOL**; 17	TMP; 13	NHA; 11	WFD; 2	SEE; 2	GLN; 7	ADI; 12	BEE; 14	THU; 10	NHA; 5	STA; 8	LRP; 5								2nd	2446	
2004	Grizco Racing	55	Chevy	LEE; 5	TMP; 2	LRP; 27*	SEE; 11	STA; 13	HOL; 12	ERI; 8	WFD; 2	NHA; 6	ADI; 10	GLN; 5	NHA; 16	DOV; 4												5th	1824	
2005	Grizco Racing	55	Chevy	STA; 9	**HOL**; 1**	ERI; 2	NHA; 1*	WFD; 5	ADI; 4	STA; 6	DUB; 5	OXF; 8	NHA; 6	DOV; 9	LRP; 5	TMP; 2												2nd	2078	

==== Whelen Modified Tour ====
NASCAR Whelen Modified Tour results
Year	Car owner	No.	Make	1	2	3	4	5	6	7	8	9	10	11	12	13	14	15	16	17	18	19	20	21	22	23	24	25	26	27	28	29	NWMTC	Pts	Ref
1985	Marek Engineering	11		TMP	MAR	STA; 5	MAR	NEG	WFD	NEG	SPE	RIV	CLA																				30th	863	
1985		9												STA; 13	TMP	NEG	HOL	HOL	RIV	CAT	EPP	TMP	WFD	RIV									30th	863	
1985	Jack Koszela	15	Chevy																						STA; 25		POC; 9	TIO	OXF	STA; 8	TMP	MAR	30th	863	
1985	Jack Koszela	16	Chevy																							TMP; 4							30th	863	
1986	Jack Koszela	15	Chevy	ROU	MAR	STA; 4	TMP; 22	MAR	NEG	MND; 14	EPP; 17	NEG									STA; 6	TMP; 16	POC; 31	TIO; 12	OXF; 10	STA; 5	TMP; 18	MAR; 28					12th	2257	
1986	Jack Koszela	37	Chevy										WFD; 7	SPE; 15	RIV; 1	NEG	TMP; 12	RIV; 22	TMP; 4	RIV													12th	2257	
1987	Jack Koszela	15	Chevy	ROU; 1	MAR; 2	TMP; 23	STA; 15	CNB; 4	STA; 6		WFD; 3	**JEN**; 5	SPE; 17	RIV; 25	TMP; 12			RIV; 15	STA; 5	TMP; 13		SEE; 22	STA; 3	POC; 36	TIO; 13	TMP; 8	OXF; 11	TMP; 12	ROU	MAR; 6	STA; 8		7th	3607	
1987	Jack Koszela	37	Chevy							MND; 3						RPS; 12					RIV; 14												7th	3607	
1987	Jack Koszela	37	Pontiac														EPP; 7																7th	3607	
1988	Jack Koszela	15	Chevy	ROU; 8	MAR; 22					MND; 1*	OSW; 23	OSW	RIV	JEN												ROU; 5							17th	2122	
1988	Jack Koszela	16	Chevy			TMP; 24	MAR	JEN	IRP							TMP; 1	RIV	OSW	TMP; 2			TMP; 1*	POC; 11	TIO	TMP; 9		MAR; 8						17th	2122	
1988	Jack Koszela	37	Chevy												**RPS**; 2*					OXF; 6													17th	2122	
1988	Jack Koszela	05	Chevy																		OSW; 20												17th	2122	
1989	Jack Koszela	16	Chevy	**MAR**; 3	TMP; 26	MAR; 1**		STA; 1*		OSW; 4	WFD; 3		RIV; 11		JEN; 4	STA; 1	RPS; 2	RIV; 14			TMP; 4			TMP; 1*	POC; 7	STA; 4		MAR; 29					1st	3941	
1989	Jack Koszela	15	Chevy				JEN; 3		IRP; 23			MND; 4		OSW; 23					**OSW**; 1**	TMP; 4		RPS; 1*	**OSW**; 4				TIO; 6		TMP; 4				1st	3941	
1990	Jack Koszela	15	Chevy	**MAR**; 22	RCH; 35	TMP; 21*	STA; 1	MAR; 2	TMP; 4	STA; 1	MND; 16	HOL; 12	STA; 1*	**RIV**; 17	JEN; 21	EPP; 2	RPS; 2*	RIV; 2	TMP; 14	RPS; 10	NHA; 2	TMP; 30	POC; 1	STA; 1	TMP; 2								2nd	3220	
1990	Jack Koszela	15	Pontiac																							MAR; 20							2nd	3220	
1991	Jack Koszela	15	Pontiac	MAR; 14	RCH; 1*	TMP; 2	NHA; 1	**MAR**; 1**	NZH; 3	STA; 6	**TMP**; 2*	FLE; 4	OXF; 3*	RIV; 10	JEN; 1	STA; 10	RPS; 3	RIV; 3	**RCH**; 4	TMP; 3	NHA; 9	TMP; 3	POC; 6	STA; 6	TMP; 3	MAR; 1*							1st	3692	
1992	Jack Koszela	15	Pontiac	MAR; 9	TMP; 29	RCH; 29	STA; 2	MAR; 2*	NHA; 5	NZH; 23	STA; 27	TMP; 25	FLE; 25	**RIV**; 1	NHA; 27	STA; 13	RPS; 15	RIV	TMP; 20	TMP; 18	NHA; 15	STA; 1*	MAR; 1*	TMP; 27									14th	2413	
1993	Mario Fiore	44	Pontiac	**RCH**; 1	STA; 23	TMP; QL^{†}	**NHA**; 2	**NZH**; 22*	STA; 6	RIV		RPS; 23	HOL	LEE; 8	RIV	STA; 3	TMP; 14			TMP; 2													17th	1860	
1993	Beal & Bacon	6	Pontiac								NHA; 12																						17th	1860	
1993	Bear Motorsports	14	Pontiac															TMP; 2	STA; 1*														17th	1860	
1994	Bear Motorsports	14	Chevy	NHA	STA	TMP	NZH	STA	LEE	TMP	RIV	TIO	NHA	RPS	HOL	TMP	RIV	NHA	STA	SPE	TMP; 16												42nd	402	
1994	Beal & Bacon	6	Chevy																			NHA; 36	STA; 27	TMP; 6									42nd	402	
1995	Beal & Bacon	6	Chevy	TMP; 30	NHA; 19	STA; 3	NZH; 5	STA; 1*	LEE; 19	TMP; 12	RIV; 17		NHA; 15	JEN	**RPS**; 1	HOL; 23	RIV; 4	NHA; 1	STA; 3	TMP; 3	NHA; 9	STA; 1	TMP; 1	TMP; 28									5th	2833	
1995	Beal & Bacon	X6	Chevy									BEE; 2																					5th	2833	
1996	Beal & Bacon	6	Chevy	TMP; 3	STA; 13	NZH; 13	STA; 11	NHA; 30	JEN	RIV; 2	LEE; 2	RPS; 26	HOL; 2	TMP; 16	RIV; 1		GLN; 1	STA; 1	NHA; 5	NHA; 2	STA; 28	FLE; 23*	TMP; 2										5th	2669	
1996	Beal & Bacon	X6	Chevy													NHA; 9																	5th	2669	
1997	Beal & Bacon	6	Chevy	TMP; 3	MAR; 2	**STA**; 1*	NZH; 1*	STA; 1*	NHA; 1			RIV; 1*		NHA; 6	RPS; 3	HOL; 2	TMP; 2	RIV; 2	NHA; 13	**GLN**; 1*	STA; 1	NHA; 3	STA; 9	FLE; 1*	TMP; 10	RCH; 1*							1st	3624	
1997	Beal & Bacon	x6	Chevy							FLE; 1	JEN																						1st	3624	
1997	Brady Motorsports	00	Chevy										GLN; 20																				1st	3624	
1998	Beal & Bacon	6	Chevy	**RPS**; 3	TMP; 1*	**MAR**; 2*	STA; 1*	NZH; 1*	STA; 1*	**GLN**; 2*	JEN; 1*	**RIV**; 2	**NHA**; 1*	NHA; 1*	LEE; 4	HOL; 1	TMP; 1*	NHA; 1	RIV; 8	STA; 3	NHA; 30	TMP; 1*	STA; 1*	TMP; 1*	FLE; 2*								1st	3725	
2000	Gary Cretty	26	Dodge	STA	RCH	STA	RIV	SEE	NHA	NZH; 1*	TMP	RIV	GLN	TMP	STA	WFD	NHA	STA	MAR														50th	350	
2000	Beal & Bacon	6	Dodge																	TMP; 2													50th	350	
2001	Spearpoint Racing	21	Chevy	SBO; 2	TMP; 2	STA; 6	WFD; 2	NZH; 34	STA; 3	RIV; 1*	**SEE**; 22	RCH; 4	NHA; 2	HOL; 21	RIV; 1*	CHE; 6	TMP; 6	STA; 1*	WFD; 3	TMP; 5	STA; 6	MAR; 21	TMP; 2										1st	2993	
2002	Spearpoint Racing	21	Chevy	TMP; 11	STA; 8	WFD; 3	NZH; 2	RIV; 12	SEE; 7	RCH; 2	STA; 11	BEE; 8	NHA; 8	RIV; 23	TMP; 32	STA; 24	WFD; 4	TMP; 1	NHA; 2	STA; 1	MAR; 10	TMP; 9											1st	2678	
2003	Spearpoint Racing	21	Chevy	TMP; 4	STA	WFD; 10	NZH	STA; 9	LER	BLL	BEE	NHA; 5*	ADI	RIV	TMP; 1*	STA	WFD	TMP; 39*	NHA; 4	STA; 10	TMP; 5												29th	1262	
2004	Eric Sanderson	16	Chevy	TMP	STA	WFD; 2	NZH	STA	RIV; 3	LER	BLL	BEE	NHA; 3	SEE	RIV; 25	STA; 4	TMP; 20	WFD; 3	TMP; 4	NHA; 11	STA; 3	TMP; 1											22nd	1651	
2005	Brady Motorsports	00	Dodge	TMP; 4	STA; 33	RIV; 5	WFD	STA; 18	JEN	NHA; 11	BEE	SEE																					17th	1725	
2005	Eric Sanderson	16	Chevy										RIV; 9	STA; 4*	TMP; 23	WFD	MAR; 2	TMP; 5	NHA; 2	STA; 31													17th	1725	
2005	Eric Sanderson	6	Chevy																		TMP; 6												17th	1725	
2006	Eric Sanderson	16	Chevy	TMP; 1	STA; 4	JEN; 11	TMP; 6	STA; 5	NHA; 5	**HOL**; 3	RIV; 4	STA; 5	TMP; 6	MAR; 10*	TMP; 9	**NHA**; 4	WFD; 4	TMP; 5	STA; 6														1st	2457	
2007	Eric Sanderson	16	Chevy	TMP; 34	STA; 4	WTO; 5	STA; 12	TMP; 15	NHA; 13	TSA; 7		STA; 3						STA; 1*	TMP; 8														7th	2077	
2007	Eric Sanderson	16	Pontiac								**RIV**; 11*		TMP; 30	MAN; 12	MAR; 22	NHA; 9	TMP; 10																7th	2077	
2008	Eric Sanderson	16	Pontiac	TMP; 33	STA; 4	STA; 4	TMP; 3	NHA; 26	SPE; 5	RIV; 7	STA; 7	TMP; 5	MAN; 8	TMP; 22	NHA; 27	MAR; 18	CHE; 3	**STA**; 1*	TMP; 24														7th	2102	
2009	Eric Sanderson	16	Pontiac	TMP; 7	STA; 4	STA; 4	NHA; 23	SPE; 7	RIV; 19	STA; 29	BRI; 16	TMP; 32	NHA; 5	MAR; 1	STA; 8	TMP; 20																	7th	1650	
2010	Eric Sanderson	16	Pontiac	TMP; 3	STA; 3	STA; 7	MAR; 4	NHA; 27	LIM; 6	MND; 11	RIV; 4	STA; 2	TMP; 5	BRI; 2	NHA; 3	STA; 5	TMP; 4																2nd	2153	
2011	Eric Sanderson	16	Pontiac	TMP; 3	STA; 5	STA; 15	MND; 7	TMP; 26	NHA; 27	RIV; 22	STA; 2	NHA; 1	BRI; 16	DEL																			11th	1957	
2011	Eric Sanderson	16	Ford												TMP; 19	LRP; 2	NHA; 8	STA; 30															11th	1957	
2011	Ed Marceau	86	Chevy																TMP; 9														11th	1957	
2012	Ed Marceau	66	Chevy	TMP; 3	STA; 9	MND; 7	STA; 26	WFD; 22									TMP; 4																11th	421	
2012	Ed Marceau	66	Ford						NHA; 1	STA; 19	**TMP**; 5*	BRI; 20	TMP; 6	RIV	NHA; 29	STA; 6																	11th	421	
2013	Christopher Our	22	Ford	**TMP**; 1*	STA; 9			RIV; 5		MND; 14			BRI; 1	RIV; 26		STA; 6	TMP; 16																5th	480	
2013	Christopher Our	22	Chevy			STA; 8	WFD; 11		NHA; 22		STA; 8	TMP; 11			NHA; 6																		5th	480	
2014	Ed Marceau	1	Chevy	TMP; 24	STA	STA	WFD	RIV	NHA; 30	MND	STA; 14	TMP	BRI	NHA; 10	STA	TMP																	28th	98	
^{†} – Qualified for Kerry Malone

Sporting positions
Preceded by Dave Dion	NASCAR Busch North Series champion 1997, 1998	Succeeded by Brad Leighton
Preceded by Tony Hirschman	NASCAR Whelen Modified Tour champion 2006	Succeeded by Donny Lia
Preceded by Jerry Marquis	NASCAR Featherlite Modified Series champion 2001, 2002	Succeeded by Todd Szegedy
Preceded by Tony Hirschman	NASCAR Featherlite Modified Series champion 1997, 1998	Succeeded by Tony Hirschman
Preceded by Jamie Tomaino	NASCAR Winston Modified Tour champion 1991	Succeeded by Jeff Fuller
Preceded by Mike McLaughlin	NASCAR Winston Modified Tour champion 1989	Succeeded by Jamie Tomaino
Achievements
Preceded by Greg Biffle	NASCAR Craftsman Truck Series Rookie of the Year; 1999	Succeeded by Kurt Busch
