= Chris Kopec =

American racing driver (born 1964)

- Nationality: American
- Born: August 10, 1964 (age 62) Palmer, Massachusetts, U.S.

NASCAR Whelen Modified Tour career
- Debut season: 1988
- Years active: 1988, 1990–1992, 1995–2003, 2005, 2011
- Starts: 175
- Championships: 0
- Wins: 2
- Poles: 1
- Best finish: 4th in 1998
- Statistics up to date as of October 8, 2024.

Chris Kopec (born August 10, 1964) is an American former professional stock car racing driver who competed in the NASCAR Whelen Modified Tour from 1988 to 2011.

Kopec drove in the series from 1988 to 2011, getting two wins and one pole position. His son Dylan Kopec currently races in the SK Modified division at the Stafford Motor Speedway.

== Motorsports results ==
=== NASCAR ===
(key) (Bold – Pole position awarded by qualifying time. Italics – Pole position earned by points standings or practice time. * – Most laps led.)

==== Whelen Modified Tour ====
NASCAR Whelen Modified Tour results
| Year | Team | No. | Make | 1 | 2 | 3 | 4 | 5 | 6 | 7 | 8 | 9 | 10 | 11 | 12 | 13 | 14 | 15 | 16 | 17 | 18 | 19 | 20 | 21 | 22 | 23 | 24 | NWMTC | Pts | Ref |
|---|---|---|---|---|---|---|---|---|---|---|---|---|---|---|---|---|---|---|---|---|---|---|---|---|---|---|---|---|---|---|
| 1988 | N/A | 85 | N/A | ROU | MAR | TMP | MAR | JEN | IRP | MND | OSW | OSW | RIV | JEN | RPS | TMP | RIV | OSW | TMP | OXF | OSW | TMP; 42 | POC | TIO | TMP | ROU | MAR | N/A | 0 | |
| 1990 | Kopec Racing | 85 | Chevy | MAR | TMP | RCH | STA | MAR | STA | TMP | MND | HOL | STA | RIV | JEN | EPP | RPS | RIV | TMP | RPS; 26 | NHA | TMP | POC | STA | TMP | MAR | | N/A | 0 | |
| 1991 | N/A | 06 | Chevy | MAR | RCH | TMP | NHA | MAR | NZH | STA | TMP | FLE | OXF | RIV | JEN | STA; 13 | RPS | RIV | RCH | TMP | NHA; 24 | TMP | POC | | | | | N/A | 0 | |
| 1991 | N/A | 37 | Pontiac | | | | | | | | | | | | | | | | | | | | | STA; 27 | TMP; 36 | MAR | | N/A | 0 | |
| 1992 | N/A | 06 | Chevy | MAR | TMP | RCH | STA | MAR | NHA | NZH | STA | TMP | FLE | RIV | NHA | STA | RPS; 23 | RIV | TMP | TMP | NHA | STA | MAR | TMP | | | | N/A | 0 | |
| 1995 | Eric Sanderson | 16 | Chevy | TMP | NHA | STA; 29 | NZH | STA; 18 | LEE | TMP; 22 | RIV | BEE | NHA; 23 | JEN | RPS; 21 | HOL | RIV | NHA; 18 | STA | TMP | NHA; 16 | STA; 17 | TMP; 32 | TMP; 8 | | | | 32nd | 1021 | |
| 1996 | Eric Sanderson | 16 | Chevy | TMP; 23 | STA; 11 | NZH; 17 | STA; 15 | NHA; 38 | JEN; 25 | RIV | LEE; 6 | RPS; 25 | HOL; 9 | TMP; 14 | RIV; 21 | NHA; 35 | GLN; 7 | STA; 26 | NHA; 15 | NHA; 6 | STA; 9 | FLE; 36 | TMP; 28 | | | | | 19th | 2090 | |
| 1997 | Eric Sanderson | 16 | Chevy | TMP; 29 | MAR; 14 | STA; 24 | NZH; 40 | STA; 15 | NHA; 14 | FLE; 27 | JEN; 29 | RIV | GLN; 9 | NHA; 8 | RPS; 22 | HOL; 5 | TMP; 27 | RIV; 28 | NHA; 4 | GLN; 33 | STA; 11 | NHA; 8 | STA; 16 | FLE; 35 | TMP; 9 | RCH; 25 | | 16th | 2377 | |
| 1998 | Eric Sanderson | 16 | Chevy | RPS; 11 | TMP; 9 | MAR; 27 | STA; 22 | NZH; 13 | STA; 2 | GLN; 3 | JEN; 20 | RIV; 15 | NHA; 16 | NHA; 7 | LEE; 23 | HOL; 4 | TMP; 3 | NHA; 3 | RIV; 20 | STA; 15 | NHA; 2 | TMP; 2 | STA; 18 | TMP; 3 | FLE; 11 | | | 4th | 2937 | |
| 1999 | Eric Sanderson | 16 | Chevy | TMP; 3 | RPS; 20 | STA; 2 | RCH; 26 | **STA**; 18 | RIV; 22 | JEN; 6 | NHA; 24 | NZH; 11 | HOL; 1 | TMP; 5 | NHA; 4 | RIV; 9 | GLN; 11 | STA; 5 | RPS; 10 | TMP; 3 | NHA; 22 | STA; 8 | MAR; 22 | TMP; 8 | | | | 6th | 2795 | |
| 2000 | Eric Sanderson | 16 | Chevy | STA; 15 | RCH; 13 | STA; 5 | RIV; 20 | SEE; 9 | NHA; 9 | NZH; 32 | TMP; 16 | RIV; 19 | GLN; 13 | TMP; 6 | STA; 10 | WFD; 13 | NHA; 7 | STA; 10 | MAR; 34 | TMP; 26 | | | | | | | | 11th | 2022 | |
| 2001 | Eric Sanderson | 16 | Chevy | SBO | TMP; 22 | STA; 9 | WFD | NZH | STA; 14 | RIV | SEE; 1* | RCH; 31 | NHA; 5 | HOL; 13 | RIV; 16 | CHE | TMP; 5 | STA; 8 | WFD | TMP; 8 | STA; 11 | MAR | TMP; DNQ | | | | | 24th | 1585 | |
| 2002 | Eric Sanderson | 16 | Chevy | TMP; 3 | STA; DNQ | WFD; 21 | NZH; 13 | RIV; DNQ | SEE; 26 | RCH; 12 | STA; 5 | BEE; 21 | NHA; 7 | RIV; 11 | TMP; 26 | STA; 15 | WFD; 15 | TMP; 20 | NHA; 9 | STA; 7 | MAR; 37 | TMP; 8 | | | | | | 16th | 2141 | |
| 2003 | Eric Sanderson | 16 | Chevy | TMP; 35 | STA; 21 | WFD; 17 | NZH; 14 | STA; 14 | LER; 22 | BLL; 22 | BEE; 7 | NHA; 10 | ADI; 17 | RIV; 12 | TMP; 12 | STA; 25 | WFD; 18 | TMP; 34 | NHA; 37 | STA; 4 | TMP; 30 | | | | | | | 15th | 1895 | |
| 2005 | Eric Sanderson | 16 | Chevy | TMP; 6 | STA; 10 | RIV; 19 | WFD; 13 | STA; 27 | JEN; 8 | NHA; 20 | BEE; 12 | SEE; 16 | RIV | STA | TMP | WFD | MAR | TMP | NHA | STA | TMP | | | | | | | 28th | 1083 | |
| 2011 | Hill Enterprises | 79 | Chevy | TMP | STA | STA | MND | TMP | NHA | RIV | STA | NHA | BRI | DEL | TMP | LRP | NHA | STA; 29 | TMP | | | | | | | | | 55th | 76 | |
