= Tommy Cloce =

American racing driver

- Nationality: American
- Born: September 16, 1969 (age 57) Canton, New York, U.S.

NASCAR Whelen Modified Tour career
- Debut season: 1998
- Years active: 1998–2006
- Starts: 53
- Championships: 0
- Wins: 0
- Poles: 0
- Best finish: 19th in 2004
- Statistics up to date as of October 8, 2024.

Tommy Cloce (born September 16, 1969) is an American former professional stock car racing driver who competed in the NASCAR Whelen Modified Tour from 1998 to 2006. Close's father Ed is well known for being the owner of the signature #69 "Hemi-Cuda" entry that has been piloted by many famous drivers such as Reggie Ruggiero, Jerry Cook, Brian Ross, and many others.

Cloce has also previously competed in series such as the now ARCA Menards Series East, the Race of Champions Asphalt Modified Tour, and the World Series of Asphalt Stock Car Racing.

== Motorsports results ==
=== NASCAR ===
(key) (Bold – Pole position awarded by qualifying time. Italics – Pole position earned by points standings or practice time. * – Most laps led.)

==== Whelen Modified Tour ====
NASCAR Whelen Modified Tour results
Year	Team	No.	Make	1	2	3	4	5	6	7	8	9	10	11	12	13	14	15	16	17	18	19	20	21	22	NWMTC	Pts	Ref
1998	Ed Cloce	69	Chevy	RPS	TMP	MAR	STA	NZH	STA	GLN	JEN	RIV	NHA	NHA	LEE	HOL	TMP	NHA	RIV	STA	NHA; 33	TMP	STA	TMP	FLE	N/A	0	
1999	Ed Cloce	69	Chevy	TMP; DNQ	RPS; DNQ	STA; DNQ	RCH; 20	STA; DNQ	RIV	JEN; DNQ							GLN; DNQ	STA; DNQ	RPS	TMP	NHA	STA	MAR	TMP		50th	424	
1999	Ed Cloce	69	Dodge								NHA; DNQ	NZH	HOL	TMP	NHA; DNQ	RIV; DNQ										50th	424	
2000	Ed Cloce	69	Chevy	STA	RCH; 32	STA	RIV	SEE	NHA; 21	NZH			GLN; 10	TMP	STA	WFD	NHA	STA	MAR	TMP						54th	323	
2000	Boehler Racing Enterprises	3	Chevy								TMP; 2	RIV														54th	323	
2001	Ed Cloce	69	Chevy	SBO; DNQ	TMP; DNQ	STA; DNQ	WFD; DNQ	NZH; 24	STA; DNQ	RIV	SEE	RCH	NHA	HOL; DNQ	RIV	CHE; 10	TMP; DNQ	STA; DNQ	WFD; DNQ	TMP	STA	MAR	TMP			32nd	903	
2002	Ed Cloce	69	Chevy	TMP; 33	STA	WFD	NZH; 27	RIV	SEE	RCH; 35	STA	BEE	NHA; 20		TMP; DNQ	STA	WFD	TMP; 30	NHA; 38	STA	MAR	TMP				48th	484	
2002	Ed Partridge	12	Pontiac											RIV; 27												48th	484	
2003	Ed Cloce	69	Chevy	TMP; 22	STA	WFD; DNQ	NZH; 30	STA	LER; 17	BLL	BEE	NHA; 11	ADI; 20	RIV	TMP; 21	STA; DNQ	WFD; DNQ	TMP; 9	NHA; 13	STA; 14	TMP; DNQ					30th	1242	
2004	Ed Cloce	69	Chevy	TMP; 17	STA; DNQ	WFD; 27	NZH; 38	STA; 4	RIV; DNQ	LER; 12	WAL; 19	BEE; 19	NHA; 15	SEE; 19	RIV; DNQ	STA; 30	TMP; 15	WFD; 16	TMP; 24	NHA; 21	STA; 28	TMP; DNQ				19th	1759	
2005	Ed Cloce	69	Chevy	TMP; 18	STA; 22	RIV; 25	WFD; 24	STA; 30	JEN; 17	NHA; 18	BEE; 16	SEE	RIV	STA	TMP	WFD	MAR	TMP	NHA; 13	STA	TMP; 29					30th	994	
2006	Ed Cloce	69	Chevy	TMP; DNQ	STA; DNQ	JEN; 19	TMP	STA	NHA; DNQ	HOL	RIV	STA	TMP	MAR	TMP	NHA	WFD	TMP	STA							52nd	163	
