= Eric Beers =

American racing driver

- Nationality: American
- Born: August 16, 1969 (age 57) Northampton, Pennsylvania, U.S.

NASCAR Whelen Modified Tour career
- Debut season: 1997
- Years active: 1997–2012
- Former teams: Boehler Racing Enterprises, Robert Katon Jr., John Blewett, Dave DeLange
- Starts: 184
- Championships: 0
- Wins: 2
- Poles: 9
- Best finish: 3rd in 2011
- Statistics up to date as of July 31, 2024.

Eric Beers (born August 16, 1969) is an American former professional stock car racing driver who competed in the NASCAR Whelen Modified Tour from 1997 to 2012. He is the father of Austin Beers, who currently competes full-time in the Tour, and has competed since 2021.

Beers also in series such as the USAC Silver Crown Series, the Tri-Track Open Modified Series, the Race of Champions Asphalt Modified Tour, and the World Series of Asphalt Stock Car Racing.

== Motorsports results ==
=== NASCAR ===
(key) (Bold – Pole position awarded by qualifying time. Italics – Pole position earned by points standings or practice time. * – Most laps led.)

==== Whelen Modified Tour ====
NASCAR Whelen Modified Tour results
| Year | Car owner | No. | Make | 1 | 2 | 3 | 4 | 5 | 6 | 7 | 8 | 9 | 10 | 11 | 12 | 13 | 14 | 15 | 16 | 17 | 18 | 19 | 20 | 21 | 22 | 23 | NWMTC | Pts | Ref |
|---|---|---|---|---|---|---|---|---|---|---|---|---|---|---|---|---|---|---|---|---|---|---|---|---|---|---|---|---|---|
| 1997 | N/A | 81 | Chevy | TMP | MAR | STA | NZH | STA | NHA | FLE | JEN | RIV | GLN | NHA | RPS | HOL | TMP | RIV | NHA | GLN | STA | NHA | STA | FLE; 12 | TMP | RCH | N/A | 0 | |
| 1998 | N/A | 91 | Chevy | RPS | TMP | MAR | STA | NZH; 19 | STA | GLN | JEN | RIV | NHA | NHA | LEE | HOL | TMP | NHA | RIV | STA | NHA | TMP | STA | TMP | | | N/A | 0 | |
| 1998 | N/A | 94 | Chevy | | | | | | | | | | | | | | | | | | | | | | FLE; 10 | | N/A | 0 | |
| 1999 | N/A | 91 | Chevy | TMP; DNQ | RPS; DNQ | STA | RCH; 32 | STA | RIV | JEN | NHA | NZH; 39 | HOL | TMP | NHA | RIV | GLN | STA | RPS; 21 | | | | | | | | 48th | 453 | |
| 1999 | N/A | 36 | Pontiac | | | | | | | | | | | | | | | | | TMP; 10 | NHA | STA | MAR | TMP; 12 | | | 48th | 453 | |
| 2000 | N/A | 36 | Pontiac | STA | RCH; 23 | STA | RIV | SEE | NHA | NZH; 20 | TMP | RIV | GLN | TMP | STA | WFD | NHA | STA | MAR | TMP | | | | | | | 67th | 197 | |
| 2001 | N/A | 19 | Pontiac | SBO | TMP | STA | WFD | NZH; 12 | STA | RIV | SEE | | | | | | | | | | | | | | | | 45th | 403 | |
| 2001 | N/A | 19 | Chevy | | | | | | | | | RCH; 8 | NHA | HOL | RIV | CHE | TMP | STA | WFD | TMP | STA | MAR | TMP; 10 | | | | 45th | 403 | |
| 2002 | N/A | 36 | Dodge | TMP; 18 | STA; DNQ | WFD | NZH; 29 | RIV; 9 | SEE; 13 | RCH; 22 | STA; 15 | BEE; 26 | NHA; 12 | RIV; DNQ | TMP; 31 | STA; 25 | WFD | TMP; 26 | NHA | STA; 11 | MAR; 36 | TMP; DNQ | | | | | 25th | 1449 | |
| 2003 | N/A | 14 | Dodge | TMP; 8 | STA; 12 | WFD; 25 | NZH; 9 | STA; 13 | LER; 3 | BLL; 28 | BEE; 23 | NHA; 15 | ADI; 30 | RIV; 16 | TMP; 19 | STA; 10 | WFD; 20 | TMP; 21 | NHA; 33 | STA; 29 | TMP; 10 | | | | | | 11th | 1980 | |
| 2004 | N/A | 02 | Chevy | TMP; 27 | STA; 22 | WFD; 24 | NZH; 40 | | **RIV**; 22 | LER; 25 | WAL; 27 | | | | | | | | | | | | | | | | 15th | 2020 | |
| 2004 | N/A | 00 | N/A | | | | | STA; DNQ | | | | | | | | | | | | | | | | | | | 15th | 2020 | |
| 2004 | N/A | 19 | Chevy | | | | | | | | | BEE; 25 | NHA; 16 | SEE; 4 | RIV; 8 | STA; 3 | TMP; 8 | WFD; 18 | | NHA; 7 | STA; 15 | TMP; 32 | | | | | 15th | 2020 | |
| 2004 | N/A | 02 | Dodge | | | | | | | | | | | | | | | | TMP; 13 | | | | | | | | 15th | 2020 | |
| 2005 | Boehler Racing Enterprises | 3 | Chevy | TMP; 29 | STA | RIV; 2 | WFD; 3 | **STA**; 7 | **JEN**; 14 | NHA; 3 | BEE; 3 | SEE; 1* | RIV; 5 | STA; 6 | TMP; 3 | WFD; 7 | MAR; 4 | TMP; 10 | NHA; 9 | STA; 7 | TMP; 25 | | | | | | 5th | 2470 | |
| 2006 | Boehler Racing Enterprises | 3 | Chevy | TMP; 21 | STA; 3 | JEN; 4 | TMP; 4 | STA; 12 | NHA; 12 | HOL; 18 | RIV; 27 | STA; 28 | TMP; 30 | MAR; 27 | TMP; 1 | NHA; 9 | WFD; 24 | TMP; 26 | STA; 11 | | | | | | | | 10th | 1888 | |
| 2007 | N/A | 94 | Chevy | TMP; 11 | STA; 20 | WTO; 21 | STA; 10 | TMP; 14 | NHA; 33 | TSA; 16 | RIV; 19 | STA; 8 | TMP; 13 | MAN; 5 | MAR; 10 | NHA; 22 | TMP; 23 | STA; 19 | TMP; 16 | | | | | | | | 11th | 1840 | |
| 2008 | Robert Katon Jr. | 46 | Chevy | TMP; 28 | STA; 2 | STA; 5 | TMP; 14 | NHA; 4 | SPE; 17 | RIV; 10 | **STA**; 5 | TMP; 32 | **MAN**; 4 | TMP; 10 | NHA; 10 | MAR; 11 | CHE; 16 | STA; 5 | **TMP**; 10 | | | | | | | | 6th | 2115 | |
| 2009 | Robert Katon Jr. | 46 | Chevy | TMP; 11 | STA; 16 | STA; 11 | NHA; 16 | SPE; 19 | RIV; 6 | STA; 4 | BRI; 10 | TMP; 6 | NHA; 24 | MAR; 18 | STA; 7 | TMP; 18 | | | | | | | | | | | 8th | 1645 | |
| 2010 | John Blewett | 76 | Chevy | TMP; 10 | STA; 27 | STA; 28 | MAR; 7 | NHA; 10 | LIM; 25 | MND; 10 | RIV; 6 | STA; 6 | TMP; 11 | BRI; 12 | NHA; 18 | STA; 9 | TMP; 7 | | | | | | | | | | 9th | 1752 | |
| 2011 | David DeLange | 45 | Chevy | TMP; 6 | STA; 4 | STA; 11 | MND; 12 | TMP; 8 | NHA; 11 | RIV; 11 | STA; 4 | NHA; 5 | BRI; 6 | DEL; 5 | TMP; 17 | LRP; 8 | NHA; 5 | STA; 4 | TMP; 7 | | | | | | | | 3rd | 2309 | |
| 2012 | David DeLange | 45 | Chevy | TMP; 21 | STA; 24 | MND; 8 | STA; 13 | WFD; 7 | NHA; 4 | STA; 4 | TMP; 11 | BRI; 13 | TMP; 8 | RIV; 11 | NHA; 6 | STA; 13 | TMP; 5 | | | | | | | | | | 6th | 469 | |
