= Gregg Shivers =

American racing driver

- Nationality: American
- Born: September 3, 1974 (age 52) Rocky Point, New York, U.S.

NASCAR Whelen Modified Tour career
- Debut season: 2001
- Years active: 2001–2005, 2008
- Starts: 44
- Championships: 0
- Wins: 0
- Poles: 0
- Best finish: 17th in 2004
- Statistics up to date as of October 7, 2024.

Gregg Shivers (born September 3, 1974) is an American former professional stock car racing driver who previously competed in the NASCAR Whelen Modified Tour.

Shivers drove in the series from 2001 to 2008, getting a best finish of seventh at Riverhead Raceway in 2004.

== Motorsports results ==
=== NASCAR ===
(key) (Bold – Pole position awarded by qualifying time. Italics – Pole position earned by points standings or practice time. * – Most laps led.)

==== Whelen Modified Tour ====
NASCAR Whelen Modified Tour results
Year	Team	No.	Make	1	2	3	4	5	6	7	8	9	10	11	12	13	14	15	16	17	18	19	20	NWMTC	Pts	Ref
2001	N/A	23	Chevy	SBO	TMP	STA	WFD	NZH	STA	RIV; DNQ	SEE	RCH	NHA	HOL	RIV; 28	CHE	TMP; 20	STA	WFD	TMP	STA; DNQ	MAR	TMP	58th	250	
2002	N/A	23	Chevy	TMP; DNQ	STA	WFD	NZH; DNQ	RIV; 26	SEE	RCH	STA	BEE	NHA; 26	RIV; 12	TMP	STA	WFD; 29	TMP	NHA	STA; DNQ	MAR	TMP		49th	481	
2003	N/A	23	Chevy	TMP; 24	STA	WFD	NZH	STA	LER	BLL	BEE	NHA; 40	ADI	RIV; 27	TMP	STA	WFD	TMP	NHA; 24	STA; 30	TMP; DNQ			46th	441	
2004	N/A	23	Pontiac	TMP; 15	STA; 26	WFD; DNQ	NZH; 21	STA; 21	RIV; 7	LER; 16	WAL; 18	BEE; 24	NHA; 35	SEE; 23	RIV; 12	STA; 21	TMP; 17	WFD; 10	TMP; 23		STA; 14	TMP; 28		17th	1832	
2004	N/A	09	Chevy																	NHA; 41				17th	1832	
2005	N/A	23	Pontiac	TMP; 15	STA; 21	RIV; 21	WFD; 9	STA	JEN; 9	NHA; 24	BEE; 17	SEE; 19	RIV; 19	STA; 21	TMP; 25	WFD; 18		TMP; 32	NHA	STA; 30	TMP; 28			19th	1634	
2005	N/A	2	Chevy														MAR; 18							19th	1634	
2008	N/A	53	N/A	TMP	STA	STA	TMP	NHA	SPE	RIV	STA	TMP	MAN	TMP	NHA	MAR	CHE	STA	TMP; DNQ					69th	61	
