= Nevin George =

American racing driver

- Nationality: American
- Born: January 5, 1982 (age 44) Kunkletown, Pennsylvania, U.S.

NASCAR Whelen Modified Tour career
- Debut season: 1999
- Years active: 1999–2007
- Starts: 99
- Championships: 0
- Wins: 2
- Poles: 4
- Best finish: 8th in 2002
- Statistics up to date as of October 8, 2024.

Nevin George (born January 5, 1982) is an American professional stock car racing driver who competed in the NASCAR Whelen Modified Tour from 1999 to 2007.

George has previously competed in series such as the now ARCA Menards Series East, the Race of Champions Asphalt Modified Tour, and the World Series of Asphalt Stock Car Racing.

== Motorsports results ==
=== NASCAR ===
(key) (Bold – Pole position awarded by qualifying time. Italics – Pole position earned by points standings or practice time. * – Most laps led.)

==== Whelen Modified Tour ====
NASCAR Whelen Modified Tour results
Year	Team	No.	Make	1	2	3	4	5	6	7	8	9	10	11	12	13	14	15	16	17	18	19	20	21	NWMTC	Pts	Ref
1999	Bruce George	63	Chevy	TMP	RPS	STA	RCH	STA; DNQ	RIV	JEN; 27	NHA; 39	NZH	HOL	TMP	NHA; DNQ	RIV	GLN; DNQ	STA	RPS	TMP; 36	NHA	STA; DNQ	MAR; DNQ	TMP	N/A	0	
2000	Bruce George	63	Chevy	STA; 25	RCH; 30	STA; DNQ	RIV	SEE; DNQ	NHA; 26	NZH; 15	TMP; DNQ	RIV; DNQ	GLN; 31	TMP	STA; DNQ	WFD; DNQ	NHA; 21	STA; 29	MAR; 16	TMP; 36					27th	1145	
2001	Bruce George	63	Chevy	SBO; 31	TMP; 15	STA; DNQ	WFD; DNQ	NZH; 17																	21st	1920	
2001	Bruce George	11	Chevy						STA; 8	RIV; DNQ	SEE; 11	RCH; 40	NHA; 8	HOL; 25	RIV; 18	CHE; 7	TMP; 13	STA; 28	WFD; 17	TMP; 35	STA; 13	MAR; 29	TMP; 32		21st	1920	
2002	Bruce George	0	Chevy	TMP; 27	STA; 19	WFD; 5	NZH; 1*	RIV; 28	SEE; 15	RCH; 3	**STA**; 12	**BEE**; 6	NHA; 3	RIV; 14	TMP; 14	STA; 8	WFD; 17	TMP; 7	**NHA**; 11	STA; 22	MAR; 12	TMP; 5			8th	2478	
2003	Bruce George	0	Chevy	TMP; 29	STA; 9	WFD; 30	NZH; 4	STA; 27	LER; 7	BLL; 25	BEE; 28	NHA; 7	ADI; 23	RIV; 22	TMP; 16	STA; 2	WFD; 10	TMP; 35	NHA; 26	**STA**; 5	TMP; 28				12th	1975	
2004	Bruce George	0	Chevy	TMP; 19	STA; 23	WFD; 6	NZH; 14	STA; 29	RIV; 25	LER; 7	WAL; 10	BEE; 1*	NHA; 23	SEE; 13	RIV; 28	STA; 24*	TMP; 25	WFD; 25	TMP; 17	NHA; 34	STA; 17	TMP; 15			14th	2062	
2005	Bruce George	0	Chevy	TMP; 7	STA; 12	RIV; 24	WFD; 26	STA; 21	JEN; 24	NHA; 10	BEE; 25	SEE	RIV; 24	STA	TMP	WFD	MAR	TMP							26th	1132	
2005	N/A	00	Chevy																NHA; 14	STA	TMP; DNQ				26th	1132	
2006	Bruce George	63	Chevy	TMP	STA	JEN	TMP	STA	NHA; 41	HOL	RIV	STA	TMP	MAR	TMP	NHA; 27	WFD	TMP	STA						59th	122	
2007	Bruce George	63	Chevy	TMP; 13	STA	WTO	STA	TMP	NHA; 17	TSA	RIV	STA	TMP	MAN	MAR	NHA	TMP	STA	TMP						47th	236	

=== ARCA Re/Max Series ===
(key) (Bold – Pole position awarded by qualifying time. Italics – Pole position earned by points standings or practice time. * – Most laps led. ** – All laps led.)

ARCA Re/Max Series results
Year	Team	No.	Make	1	2	3	4	5	6	7	8	9	10	11	12	13	14	15	16	17	18	19	20	21	22	ARMSC	Pts	Ref
2004	Dean MacInnis	01	Chevy	DAY; DNQ	NSH	SLM	KEN	TOL	CLT	KAN	POC	MCH	SBO	BLN	KEN	GTW	POC	LER	NSH	ISF	TOL	DSF	CHI	SLM	TAL	N/A	0	
