= John Blewett III =

Racecar driver

- Nationality: American
- Born: October 25, 1973 Howell Township, New Jersey, U.S.
- Died: August 16, 2007 (aged 33) Thompson, Connecticut, U.S.
- Relatives: Jimmy Blewett (brother)

NASCAR Whelen Modified Tour
- Years active: 1995–2007
- Teams: Dick Barney (1995–1996, 1998); Mario Fiore (1999); Curt Chase (2000–2004); Sheba Racing (2004); John Blewett Inc. (1997-1998, 2005–2007)
- Starts: 164
- Wins: 10
- Poles: 4
- Best finish: 3rd in 2001 and 2003

Awards
- 1992: Rookie of the Year

NASCAR FedEx Freight Truck Series career
- 4 races run over 3 years
- Best finish: 74th (1998)
- First race: 1996 Stevens Beil/Genuine Parts 200 (Flemington)
- Last race: 1998 Virginia Is For Lovers 200 (Richmond)
Wins	Top tens	Poles
0	0	0

John Richard Blewett III (October 25, 1973 – August 16, 2007) was an American professional stock car racing driver who competed in the NASCAR Whelen Modified Tour. He also raced in the NASCAR Craftsman Truck Series for four races between 1996 and 1998.

== Career ==
Blewett started racing go karts at the age of ten. In 1996, at age 22, he won the coveted NASCAR's Northeast Regional Championship, falling only a few points shy of the National Title. During his career, he recorded 97 wins between 1993 and 2007, including track championships at Flemington Speedway, Wall Township Speedway, New Egypt, as well as New Hampshire. In 2006, he was honored during the motorsports show in Atlantic City as the northeast's Winningest Pavement Driver, for that year, as tallied by Area Auto Racing News.

== Death and memorial ==
On August 16, 2007, while competing in a Whelen Modified race at Thompson Speedway, Blewett lost his life in a crash where he spun and was hit in the driver's door by his brother Jimmy's car. On August 18, 2007, Wall Township Speedway held a Special Memorial for John. Fans, family, and friends attended the Speedway to pay their final respects. On the final lap of the scheduled 40 lap modified event, 1990 NASCAR Whelen Modified Titlist Jamie Tomaino piloted the famed No. 76 for a solo lap in John's honor. Three months later, at the season ending Turkey Derby, the Speedway decided to reserve the No. 76 exclusively for use by the Blewett family, effectively retiring the number except that any Blewett family owned team or driver can use it, meaning any car owned by the Blewett family, or driven by brother Jimmy or his son John IV, who started racing in 2017.

The North-South Shootout, a race meet now featuring "Tour-type" Modified (similar to NASCAR Modified Tour cars, but the races are unsanctioned), SK Modified (Jack Arute owns the trademark, a Stafford Motor Speedway formula), Late Model, Super Late Model, and four-cylinder races held at various North Carolina short tracks but it is home to Caraway Speedway in Sophia, North Carolina, was renamed the John Blewett III Memorial North-South Shootout starting with the 2007 edition.

== Previous rides ==
- John Blewett, Inc. No. 5 – 1992–1993 (Wall Stadium)
- John Blewett Inc. No. 76 – 1993–1994 (Flemington Speedway)
- Lou Vasquez No. 9/No. 5 1994–1996 (New Egypt Speedway Paved)
- Dick Barney No. 14 – 1995–1996, 1998–1999 (Flemington Speedway)
- John Blewett, Inc. No. 05 – 1997 (Flemington Speedway)
- Mario Fiore No. 44 – 1999 (Nascar Whelen Modified Tour)
- Curt Chase No. 77 – 2000–2004 (Nascar Whelen Modified Tour)
- Timmy Shinn No. 66 – 2002–2004 (Wall Stadium)
- John Blewett, Inc No. 76 2005–2007 (Wall Stadium)
- Sheba Racing No. 8 2004 (Nascar Whelen Modified Tour)
- John Blewett Inc. No. 66 2005–2007 (Nascar Whelen Modified Tour)

== Accomplishments ==
- Rookie of the Year (1992)
- Thanksgiving Classic (1993)
- Race of Champions (1995)
- NASCAR Northeast Regional (1996)
- Challenge of Champions (1996, 1997)
- North-South Shootout (2003, 2005)
  - After his death, the race was named in his memory, the John Blewett III Memorial North-South Shootout.
- Turkey Derby (2000, 2001, 2004, 2005)
  - Tour-Type Modified Division
- Garden State Classic (2003, 2004, 2006)

=== Track titles ===
- Flemington Speedway (1996, 1997)
- New Hampshire International Speedway (2000, 2002, 2003, 2006)
- New Egypt Speedway (1996)
- Wall Township Speedway (2006)

== Motorsports career results ==
=== NASCAR ===
(key) (Bold – Pole position awarded by qualifying time. Italics – Pole position earned by points standings or practice time. * – Most laps led.)

==== Craftsman Truck Series ====
NASCAR Craftsman Truck Series results
Year	Team	No.	Make	1	2	3	4	5	6	7	8	9	10	11	12	13	14	15	16	17	18	19	20	21	22	23	24	25	26	27	NCTC	Pts	Ref
1996	John Blewett Inc.	0	Ford	HOM	PHO	POR	EVG	TUS	CNS	HPT	BRI	NZH	MLW	LVL	I70	IRP	FLM; 22	GLN	NSV	RCH	NHA	MAR	NWS	SON	MMR	PHO	LVS				109th	97	
1997	John Blewett Inc.	05	Chevy	WDW	TUS	HOM	PHO	POR	EVG	I70	NHA	TEX	BRI	NZH	MLW	LVL	CNS	HPT	IRP	FLM; 30	NSV	GLN	RCH; DNQ	MAR; 33	SON	MMR	CAL	PHO	LVS		87th	137	
1998	John Blewett Inc.	05	Chevy	WDW	HOM	PHO	POR	EVG	I70	GLN	TEX	BRI	MLW	NZH	CAL	PPR	IRP	NHA	FLM; DNQ	NSV	HPT	LVL									74th	85	
1998	Greenfield Racing	09	Dodge																				RCH; 26	MEM	GTY	MAR	SON	MMR	PHO	LVS	74th	85	

==== Whelen Modified Tour ====
NASCAR Whelen Modified Tour results
Year	Car owner	No.	Make	1	2	3	4	5	6	7	8	9	10	11	12	13	14	15	16	17	18	19	20	21	22	23	NWMTC	Pts	Ref
1995	Dick Barney	14	Chevy	TMP; 23	NHA	STA	NZH; 36	STA	LEE	TMP	RIV	BEE	NHA	JEN; 8	RPS	HOL	RIV	NHA	STA	TMP	NHA	STA	TMP	TMP			42nd	291	
1996	Dick Barney	14	Chevy	TMP	STA	NZH	STA	NHA	JEN	RIV	LEE	RPS	HOL	TMP	RIV	NHA	GLN	STA	NHA	NHA	STA	FLE; 30	TMP				NA	-	
1997	John Blewett Inc.	05	Chevy	TMP; 22	MAR	STA	NZH	STA	NHA	FLE; 18	JEN	RIV	GLN	NHA; 9	RPS	HOL	TMP	RIV	NHA	GLN	STA	NHA	STA	FLE; 16	TMP; 24		45th	494	
1997		77	Chevy																							RCH; 27	45th	494	
1998	John Blewett Inc.	05	Chevy	RPS	TMP; 13	MAR; 32	STA; 28		STA; 3	GLN	JEN	RIV	NHA; 5	NHA; 11	LEE	HOL	TMP; 8	NHA	RIV	STA	NHA	TMP; 7					24th	1562	
1998	Dick Barney	1	Chevy					NZH; 7																	FLE; 32		24th	1562	
1998		76	Chevy																				STA; 37	TMP; 14			24th	1562	
1999	Mario Fiore	44	Pontiac	TMP; 33	RPS; 26	STA; 33	RCH; 13	STA; 17	RIV; 1	JEN; 5	NHA; 37	NZH; 28	HOL; 9	TMP; 7	NHA; 37	RIV; 3	GLN; 22	STA; 8	RPS; 13	TMP; 34	NHA; 35	STA; 36	MAR; 6	TMP; 13			16th	2227	
2000	Curt Chase	77	Chevy	STA; 28	RCH; 6	STA; 30	RIV; 6	SEE; 22	NHA; 1	NZH; 34	TMP; 6	RIV; 5	GLN; 29	TMP; 11	STA; 1	WFD; 8	NHA; 3	**STA**; 2	MAR; 18	TMP; 8							7th	2209	
2001	Curt Chase	77	Chevy	SBO; 13	TMP; 5	STA; 1	WFD; 15	NZH; 3	STA; 6	RIV; 11	SEE; 5	RCH; 13	NHA; 7	HOL; 9	RIV; 5	CHE; 3	TMP; 2*	STA; 7	WFD; 7	TMP; 11	STA; 7	MAR; 4	**TMP**; 25				3rd	2891	
2002	Curt Chase	77	Chevy	TMP; 23	STA; 23	WFD; 25	NZH; 34	RIV; 3	SEE; 10																		9th	2377	
2002	Curt Chase	78	Chevy							RCH; 18																	9th	2377	
2002	Curt Chase	77	Pontiac								STA; DNQ	BEE; 3	NHA; 4*	RIV; 21	TMP; 13	STA; 11	WFD; 3	TMP; 4	NHA; 3	STA; 31	MAR; 5	TMP; 1*					9th	2377	
2003	Curt Chase	77	Pontiac	TMP; 2	STA; 7	WFD; 7	**NZH**; 2	**STA**; 10	LER; 2	BLL; 1*	BEE; 5	NHA; 3	ADI; 25	RIV; 8	TMP; 6	STA; 4	WFD; 7	TMP; 29	NHA; 1*	STA; 6	TMP; 27						3rd	2610	
2004	Curt Chase	77	Pontiac	TMP; 13	STA; 11	WFD; 7	NZH; 33	STA; 27	RIV; 2	LER; 11	BLL; 26	BEE; 12	NHA; 26	SEE; 7	RIV; DNQ	STA; 15	TMP; 27	WFD; 14	TMP; 38	NHA; 20	STA; 31	TMP					16th	1863	
2005	Blewett Motorsports	66	Chevy	TMP; 31	STA	RIV	WFD	STA	JEN								MAR; 3	TMP; 18	NHA; 10	STA; 9	TMP; 13*						21st	1509	
2005		80	Chevy							NHA; 40																	21st	1509	
2005		00	Dodge								BEE; 20	SEE; 2	RIV; 27			WFD; 28											21st	1509	
2005	Blewett Motorsports	66	Dodge											STA; 8	TMP; 6												21st	1509	
2006	Blewett Motorsports	66	Chevy	TMP; 36	STA; 21	JEN	TMP; 11	STA; 1	NHA; 1	HOL	RIV	STA; 23	TMP; 22	MAR	TMP; 3	NHA; 1	WFD	TMP; 20	STA; 5								23rd	1439	
2007	Blewett Motorsports	66	Chevy	TMP; 29	STA; 28	WTO; 2	STA; 27	TMP; 33	NHA; 10	TSA	RIV	STA	TMP; 16	MAN	MAR	NHA	TMP	STA	TMP								36th	720	
