= Kevin Konopka =

American racing driver

- Nationality: American
- Born: April 14, 1981 (age 45) Meriden, Connecticut, U.S.

NASCAR Whelen Modified Tour career
- Debut season: 1999
- Years active: 1999–2005
- Starts: 42
- Championships: 0
- Wins: 0
- Poles: 0
- Best finish: 21st in 2003
- Statistics up to date as of October 7, 2024.

Kevin Konopka (born April 14, 1981) is an American former professional stock car racing driver who previously competed in the NASCAR Whelen Modified Tour from 1999 to 2005.

Konopka has also competed in the Modified Racing Series.

== Motorsports results ==
=== NASCAR ===
(key) (Bold – Pole position awarded by qualifying time. Italics – Pole position earned by points standings or practice time. * – Most laps led.)

==== Whelen Modified Tour ====
NASCAR Whelen Modified Tour results
Year	Team	No.	Make	1	2	3	4	5	6	7	8	9	10	11	12	13	14	15	16	17	18	19	20	21	NWMTC	Pts	Ref
1999	N/A	51	N/A	TMP	RPS	STA	RCH	STA	RIV	JEN	NHA	NZH	HOL	TMP	NHA	RIV	GLN	STA; DNQ	RPS; DNQ	TMP; DNQ	NHA	STA; DNQ	MAR	TMP; DNQ	N/A	0	
2000	N/A	14	N/A	STA	RCH	STA	RIV	SEE	NHA	NZH	TMP	RIV	GLN	TMP	STA	WFD	NHA	STA	MAR	TMP; DNQ					N/A	0	
2001	N/A	51	N/A	SBO	TMP	STA	WFD	NZH	STA	RIV	SEE	RCH	NHA	HOL	RIV	CHE	TMP	STA	WFD	TMP	STA; DNQ	MAR	TMP; DNQ		N/A	0	
2002	N/A	51	Dodge	TMP; DNQ	STA	WFD; 18	NZH	RIV	SEE; 20	RCH	STA	BEE; 25	NHA	RIV	TMP	STA	WFD; DNQ	TMP	NHA	STA; DNQ	MAR	TMP; 21			46th	550	
2003	N/A	51	Dodge	TMP; 30	STA; DNQ	WFD; 13	NZH; 17	STA; DNQ	LER; 8	BLL; 15	BEE; 13	NHA; 24	ADI; 24	RIV; DNQ	TMP; 32	STA; 22	WFD; 15	TMP; 28	NHA	STA; DNQ	TMP; 24				21st	1541	
2004	N/A	51	Dodge	TMP; 25	STA; DNQ	WFD; 20	NZH; 31	STA; DNQ	RIV; DNQ	LER; 27	WAL; 30	BEE; 25	NHA; 13	SEE; 29	RIV; DNQ	STA; 22	TMP; DNQ	WFD; 7	TMP; 32	NHA					27th	1348	
2004	N/A	71	Dodge																		STA; DNQ	TMP; DNQ			27th	1348	
2005	N/A	51	Dodge	TMP; 26	STA; 14	RIV; 26	WFD; 17	STA; DNQ	JEN; 25	NHA; 13	BEE; 13	SEE; 29	RIV; DNQ	STA; 28	TMP; 32	WFD; 12	MAR; 21	TMP; 21	NHA; 33	STA	TMP				22nd	1492	
