= Dave Etheridge =

American racing driver

- Nationality: American
- Born: September 11, 1970 (age 56) Portland, Connecticut, U.S.

NASCAR Whelen Modified Tour career
- Debut season: 1999
- Years active: 1999–2007, 2011
- Starts: 97
- Championships: 0
- Wins: 0
- Poles: 0
- Best finish: 13th in 2003, 2005
- Statistics up to date as of September 25, 2024.

Dave Etheridge (born September 11, 1970) is an American professional stock car racing driver who competed in the NASCAR Whelen Modified Tour from 1999 to 2011.

Etheridge has also previously competed in series such as the Modified Racing Series, the Tri-Track Open Modified Series, and the EXIT Realty Modified Touring Series.

== Motorsports results ==
=== NASCAR ===
(key) (Bold – Pole position awarded by qualifying time. Italics – Pole position earned by points standings or practice time. * – Most laps led.)

==== Whelen Modified Tour ====
NASCAR Whelen Modified Tour results
Year	Team	No.	Make	1	2	3	4	5	6	7	8	9	10	11	12	13	14	15	16	17	18	19	20	21	NWMTC	Pts	Ref
1999	James Tierney	54	Chevy	TMP; 21	RPS	STA; DNQ	RCH	STA; DNQ	RIV	JEN	NHA; DNQ	NZH	HOL	TMP; DNQ	NHA; DNQ	RIV	GLN; DNQ	STA; 27		TMP; DNQ	NHA; DNQ	STA; 37	MAR	TMP	40th	584	
1999	James Tierney	51	Chevy																RPS; 19						40th	584	
2000	James Tierney	54	Chevy	STA; 21	RCH	STA; DNQ	RIV	SEE; 26	NHA; 32	NZH	TMP; 14	RIV	GLN	TMP; 8	STA; 9	WFD; 25	NHA; 26	STA; DNQ	MAR	TMP; 27					30th	994	
2001	James Tierney	54	Chevy	SBO; 7	TMP; 10	STA; 33	WFD; DNQ	NZH; 23	STA; 15	RIV; DNQ	SEE; DNQ	RCH; 22	NHA; 13	HOL	RIV	CHE	TMP	STA	WFD	TMP; 36	STA; 22	MAR	TMP; 12		31st	1212	
2002	James Tierney	54	Chevy	TMP; 10	STA; DNQ	WFD; 9	NZH; 23	RIV; DNQ	SEE; 17	RCH; 15	STA; 23	BEE; 29	NHA; 19	RIV; DNQ	TMP; 23	STA; 14	WFD; 8	TMP; 16	NHA; 14	STA; 17	MAR; 26	TMP; 23			19th	1885	
2003	James Tierney	54	Chevy	TMP; 9	STA; 19	WFD; 29	NZH; 8	STA; 22	LER; 11	BLL; 16	BEE; 11	NHA; 19	ADI; 27	RIV; 24	TMP; 17	STA; 20	WFD; 23	TMP; 15	NHA; 25	STA; 15	TMP; 13				13th	1970	
2004	James Tierney	54	Chevy	TMP; 34	STA; 15	WFD; 13	NZH; 36	STA; DNQ	RIV; DNQ	LER; 24	WAL; DNQ	BEE; 27	NHA; 17	SEE; DNQ	RIV; DNQ	STA; 25	TMP; 6	WFD; 13	TMP; 21	NHA; 12	STA; 22	TMP; 22			21st	1719	
2005	James Tierney	54	Chevy	TMP; 10	STA; 20	RIV; DNQ	WFD; 28	STA; 22	JEN	NHA; 22	BEE; 9	SEE; 13	RIV; 8	STA; 19	TMP; 10	WFD; 9	MAR; 19	TMP; 11	NHA; 18	STA; 14	TMP; 18				13th	1931	
2006	James Tierney	54	Chevy	TMP; 19	STA; 32	JEN	TMP; 21	STA; DNQ	NHA	HOL	RIV	STA	TMP	MAR	TMP	NHA; 17	WFD; 21	TMP; DNQ	STA; DNQ						36th	602	
2007	James Tierney	54	Chevy	TMP	STA; DNQ	WTO	STA; DNQ	TMP	NHA	TSA	RIV	STA	TMP	MAN	MAR	NHA	TMP	STA	TMP; DNQ						54th	153	
2011	Linda Rodenbaugh	38	Chevy	TMP; 15	STA; 31	STA; 26	MND; 20	TMP; 19	NHA	RIV	STA	NHA	BRI	DEL	TMP	LRP	NHA	STA	TMP						32nd	482	
