= Jimmy Storace =

American racing driver

- Nationality: American
- Born: December 25, 1964 (age 61) Kingston, New Hampshire, U.S.

NASCAR Whelen Modified Tour career
- Debut season: 2002
- Years active: 2002–2008
- Starts: 37
- Championships: 0
- Wins: 0
- Poles: 0
- Best finish: 23rd in 2005
- Statistics up to date as of September 17, 2024.

Jimmy Storace (born December 25, 1964) is an American professional stock car racing driver who competed in the NASCAR Whelen Modified Tour from 2002 to 2008. Storace currently races Supermodifieds on the New England Super Modified series.

Storace has also previously competed in series such as the PRO Truck Tour, the NHSTRA Street Stock Battle for the Belt, the Modified Racing Series, the Tri-Track Open Modified Series, and the World Series of Asphalt Stock Car Racing.

== Motorsports results ==
=== NASCAR ===
(key) (Bold – Pole position awarded by qualifying time. Italics – Pole position earned by points standings or practice time. * – Most laps led.)

==== Whelen Modified Tour ====
NASCAR Whelen Modified Tour results
Year	Team	No.	Make	1	2	3	4	5	6	7	8	9	10	11	12	13	14	15	16	17	18	19	NWMTC	Pts	Ref
2002	N/A	22	N/A	TMP	STA	WFD	NZH	RIV	SEE	RCH	STA	BEE	NHA	RIV	TMP	STA	WFD	TMP	NHA	STA; DNQ	MAR	TMP; DNQ	N/A	0	
2003	John Hoffmann	47	Chevy	TMP	STA	WFD	NZH	STA	LER	BLL	BEE	NHA	ADI	RIV	TMP	STA	WFD	TMP	NHA	STA	TMP; DNQ		N/A	0	
2004	John Hoffmann	47	Chevy	TMP; 36	STA; DNQ	WFD; DNQ	NZH; DNQ	STA; DNQ	RIV; DNQ	LER; 30	WAL; DNQ	BEE; DNQ	NHA; 39	SEE; DNQ	RIV	STA; 27	TMP; DNQ	WFD; 23	TMP; 33	NHA; 19	STA; DNQ	TMP; DNQ	33rd	1011	
2005	John Hoffmann	47	Chevy	TMP; 19	STA; 23	RIV; DNQ	WFD; 29	STA; 16	JEN; 22	NHA; 33	BEE; 24	SEE; 18	RIV; DNQ	STA	TMP; 17	WFD; 27	MAR; DNQ	TMP; 36	NHA; 19	STA	TMP; 22		23rd	1469	
2006	John Hoffmann	47	Chevy	TMP; 25	STA; DNQ	JEN; 25	TMP; 25	STA; DNQ	NHA; 16	HOL; 27	RIV; DNQ	STA; 14	TMP; 32	MAR; 15	TMP; 36	NHA; 22	WFD; 10	TMP; DNQ	STA; 19				25th	1295	
2007	John Hoffmann	47	Chevy	TMP; 15	STA; 24	WTO; 22	STA	TMP	NHA	TSA	RIV	STA	TMP	MAN	MAR	NHA	TMP	STA	TMP; DNQ				44th	358	
2008	John Hoffmann	47	Chevy	TMP; 37	STA	STA	TMP	NHA	SPE; 28	RIV	STA	TMP	MAN	TMP	NHA	MAR	CHE	STA	TMP				49th	131	
