= Steve Whitt =

American racing driver

- Nationality: American
- Born: July 30, 1969 (age 57) Farmingdale, New Jersey, U.S.

NASCAR Whelen Modified Tour career
- Debut season: 2003
- Years active: 2003–2006
- Starts: 43
- Championships: 0
- Wins: 0
- Poles: 0
- Best finish: 14th in 2005
- Statistics up to date as of September 25, 2024.

Steve Whitt (born July 30, 1969) is an American former professional stock car racing driver who competed in the NASCAR Whelen Modified Tour from 2002 to 2008.

Whitt has also previously competed in series such as the now defunct NASCAR Whelen Southern Modified Tour, the Race of Champions Asphalt Modified Tour, and the World Series of Asphalt Stock Car Racing.

== Motorsports results ==
=== NASCAR ===
(key) (Bold – Pole position awarded by qualifying time. Italics – Pole position earned by points standings or practice time. * – Most laps led.)

==== Whelen Modified Tour ====
NASCAR Whelen Modified Tour results
Year	Team	No.	Make	1	2	3	4	5	6	7	8	9	10	11	12	13	14	15	16	17	18	19	NWMTC	Pts	Ref
2003	Dick Greenfield	06	Dodge	TMP	STA	WFD	NZH	STA	LER	BLL	BEE	NHA	ADI	RIV	TMP	STA	WFD	TMP; 40	NHA; 17	STA; DNQ	TMP; 26		49th	304	
2004	Dick Greenfield	06	Dodge	TMP; 22	STA; 14	WFD; DNQ	NZH; 23	STA; 17	RIV; DNQ	LER; 26	WAL; 28	BEE; 21	NHA	SEE; 27	RIV; DNQ	STA; 26	TMP; 19	WFD; 29	TMP	NHA; 28	STA; DNQ	TMP; 17	25th	1403	
2005	Dick Greenfield	06	Dodge	TMP; 22	STA; DNQ	RIV; DNQ	WFD; 5	STA; DNQ	JEN; 18	NHA; 5	BEE; 4	SEE; 24	RIV; 14	STA; 30	TMP; 21	WFD; 14	MAR; 9	TMP; 23	NHA; 15	STA; 27	TMP; 10		14th	1910	
2006	Dick Greenfield	06	Dodge	TMP; 33	STA; 20	JEN; 15	TMP; 8	STA; 25	NHA; 28	HOL; 15	RIV; DNQ	STA; 30	TMP; 14	MAR; 26	TMP; 15	NHA; 20	WFD	TMP	STA				26th	1261	

==== Whelen Southern Modified Tour ====
NASCAR Whelen Southern Modified Tour results
Year	Car owner	No.	Make	1	2	3	4	5	6	7	8	9	10	11	12	13	NSWMTC	Pts	Ref
2006	Steve Whitt	06	Dodge	CRW	GRE	CRW; 19	DUB	CRW	BGS	MAR	CRW	ACE	CRW	HCY	DUB	SNM	40th	106	
