= Zach Sylvester =

American racing driver

- Nationality: American
- Born: March 28, 1982 (age 44) Lebanon, Connecticut, U.S.

NASCAR Whelen Modified Tour career
- Debut season: 2000
- Years active: 2000, 2002–2007, 2009
- Starts: 73
- Championships: 0
- Wins: 0
- Poles: 2
- Best finish: 9th in 2006
- Statistics up to date as of September 16, 2024.

Zach Sylvester (born March 28, 1982) is an American former professional stock car racing driver who competed in the NASCAR Whelen Modified Tour from 2000 to 2009.

Sylvester has also previously competed in series such as the Modified Racing Series, the Race of Champions Asphalt Modified Tour, and the World Series of Asphalt Stock Car Racing.

== Motorsports results ==
=== NASCAR ===
(key) (Bold – Pole position awarded by qualifying time. Italics – Pole position earned by points standings or practice time. * – Most laps led.)

==== Whelen Modified Tour ====
NASCAR Whelen Modified Tour results
Year	Team	No.	Make	1	2	3	4	5	6	7	8	9	10	11	12	13	14	15	16	17	18	19	NWMTC	Pts	Ref
2000	N/A	N/A	N/A	STA	RCH	STA	RIV	SEE	NHA	NZH	TMP; DNQ	RIV	GLN	TMP	STA	WFD	NHA	STA	MAR	TMP			N/A	0	
2002	Thomas Sylvester	15	Chevy	TMP; DNQ	STA; DNQ	WFD	NZH	RIV	SEE	RCH	STA; 14	BEE	NHA; 41	RIV	TMP; 10	STA; DNQ	WFD; 11	TMP	NHA; 32	STA; DNQ	MAR; 33	TMP; 10	33rd	889	
2003	Thomas Sylvester	15	Chevy	**TMP**; 5	STA; 26	WFD; 26	NZH; 27	STA; 28	LER	BLL	BEE	NHA	ADI	RIV	TMP	STA	WFD	TMP	NHA	STA	TMP		44th	486	
2004	Thomas Sylvester	15	Chevy	TMP; 4	STA; 9	WFD; 28	NZH; 34	STA; 30	RIV; 15	LER; 10	WAL; 13	BEE; 3	NHA; 6	SEE; 15	RIV; 16	STA; 11	TMP; 24	WFD; 24	TMP; 9	NHA; 8	STA; 11	TMP; 4	10th	2317	
2005	Thomas Sylvester	15	Chevy	TMP; 2	STA; 2	RIV; 14	WFD; 23	STA; 23	JEN; 7	NHA; 17	BEE; 10	SEE; 8	RIV; 6	STA; 11	TMP; 18	WFD; 23	MAR; 17	TMP; 22	NHA; 30	STA; 21	TMP; 11		10th	2178	
2006	Thomas Sylvester	15	Chevy	TMP; 28	STA; 28	JEN; 16	TMP; 18	STA; 4	**NHA**; 36	HOL; 19	RIV; 11	STA; 8	TMP; 3	MAR; 11	TMP; 12	NHA; 8	WFD; 5	TMP; 9	STA; 3				9th	1997	
2007	Curt Chase	77	Pontiac	TMP; 10	STA; 5	WTO; 31	STA; 4	TMP; 35	NHA; 15	TSA; 22	RIV	STA	TMP	MAN	MAR	NHA	TMP	STA	TMP				32nd	792	
2009	Ed Partridge	12	Chevy	TMP	STA	STA	NHA	SPE	RIV	STA	BRI	TMP	NHA	MAR	STA	TMP; 13							53rd	124	
