= 2006 NASCAR Whelen Modified Tour =

The 2006 NASCAR Whelen Modified Tour was the 22nd season of the Whelen Modified Tour (WMT). It began with the Icebreaker 150 at Thompson Speedway Motorsports Park on April 9. It ended with the CarQuest Fall Final at Stafford Motor Speedway on October 28. Tony Hirschman Jr. entered the season as the defending Drivers' Champion. Mike Stefanik won his seventh and final championship after 16 races, 209 points ahead of Ed Flemke Jr.

== Schedule ==
No.	Race title	Track	Date
1	Icebreaker 150	Thompson Speedway Motorsports Park, Thompson, Connecticut	April 9
2	Carquest Tech-Net Spring Sizzler	Stafford Motor Speedway, Stafford, Connecticut	April 23
3	Wheeler Brothers 150	Jennerstown Speedway, Jennerstown, Pennsylvania	June 13
4	New England Dodge Dealers 100	Thompson Speedway Motorsports Park, Thompson, Connecticut	June 29
5	Connecticut Classic 150	Stafford Motor Speedway, Stafford, Connecticut	July 4
6	New England 100	New Hampshire Motor Speedway, Loudon, New Hampshire	July 15
7	Paul Graff Trucking 100	Holland International Speedway, Holland, New York	July 8
8	Riverhead 200	Riverhead Raceway, Riverhead, New York	August 5
9	New England Dodge Dealers 150	Stafford Motor Speedway, Stafford, Connecticut	August 8
10	New England Dodge Dealers 150	Thompson Speedway Motorsports Park, Thompson, Connecticut	August 17
11	Made In America Whelen 300 (Note: The Made In America Whelen 300 was held as a combined event, with competitors from the Whelen Modified Tour competing along with competitors for the Whelen Southern Modified Tour. The race was run with a series-based point distribution, where drivers received points and statistical credit for their finish relative to other drivers in their series, not to the whole field in general.)	Martinsville Speedway, Martinsville, Virginia	September 2
12	Sunoco Modified Mania	Thompson Speedway Motorsports Park, Thompson, Connecticut	September 10
13	New Hampshire 100	New Hampshire Motor Speedway, Loudon, New Hampshire	September 15
14	Whelen VFD 150	Waterford Speedbowl, Waterford, Connecticut	October 8
15	World Series of Auto Racing Pres. by Whelen	Thompson Speedway Motorsports Park, Thompson, Connecticut	October 15
16	CarQuest Fall Final	Stafford Motor Speedway, Stafford, Connecticut	October 28

== Results and standings ==
=== Races ===
No.	Race	Pole position	Most laps led	Winning driver	Manufacturer
1	Icebreaker 150	Jerry Marquis	Chuck Hossfeld	Mike Stefanik	Chevrolet
2	Carquest Tech-Net Spring Sizzler	Donny Lia	Doug Coby	Doug Coby	Pontiac
3	Wheeler Brothers 150	Tony Hirschman Jr.	Ed Flemke Jr.	Ted Christopher	Chevrolet
4	New England Dodge Dealers 100	Jimmy Blewett	James Civali	Todd Szegedy	Ford
5	Connecticut Classic 150	Mike Stefanik	Jimmy Blewett	John Blewett III	Chevrolet
6	New England 100	Zach Sylvester	Ted Christopher	John Blewett III	Chevrolet
7	Paul Graff Trucking 100	Matt Hirschman	Tony Hirschman Jr.	Tony Hirschman Jr.	Chevrolet
8	Riverhead 200	Ted Christopher	Ted Christopher	Ted Christopher	Chevrolet
9	New England Dodge Dealers 150	Tony Hirschman Jr.	James Civali	James Civali	Chevrolet
10	New England Dodge Dealers 150	Tony Hirschman Jr.	Tony Hirschman Jr.	Ted Christopher	Chevrolet
11	Made In America Whelen 300	Mike Stefanik	Mike Stefanik	Jimmy Blewett	Chevrolet
12	Sunoco Modified Mania	Donny Lia	Matt Hirschman	Eric Beers	Chevrolet
13	New Hampshire 100	Mike Stefanik	Todd Szegedy	John Blewett III	Chevrolet
14	Whelen VFD 150	Jerry Marquis	Ed Flemke Jr.	Donny Lia	Chevrolet
15	World Series of Auto Racing Pres. by Whelen	Tony Hirschman Jr.	Ted Christopher	Reggie Ruggiero	Chevrolet
16	CarQuest Fall Final	Todd Szegedy	Todd Szegedy	Todd Szegedy	Ford

=== Drivers' championship ===
(key) Bold - Pole position awarded by time. Italics - Pole position set by final practice results or rainout. * – Most laps led.

Pos	Driver	THO	STA	JEN	THO	STA	NHA	HOL	RIV	STA	THO	MAR	THO	NHA	WFD	THO	STA	Points
1	Mike Stefanik	1	4	11	6	**5**	5	3	4	5	6	**14***	9	4	4	5	6	2457
2	Ed Flemke Jr.	18	27	3*	2	16	4	4	10	7	7	12	4	7	2*	18	9	2248
3	Ted Christopher	4	6	1	29	6	7*	2	**1***	22	1	2	28	6	3	19*	25	2247
4	Tony Hirschman Jr.	5	9	**2**	5	7	11	1*	20	**21**	**2***	27	33	10	18	**6**	4	2170
5	Todd Szegedy	17	12	8	1	23	6	6	9	6	21	4	11	5*	27	16	**1***	2165
6	Jerry Marquis	**33**	11	6	32	10	8	5	3	16	10	16	6	2	**23**	3	10	2096
7	James Civali	6	7	12	3*	24	2	10	17	1*	31	3	14	3	14	30	22	2087
8	Donny Lia	15	**2**	5	12	3	38	21	19	17	9	17	**19**	30	1	4	7	2029
9	Zach Sylvester	28	28	16	18	4	**36**	19	11	8	3	15	12	8	5	9	3	1997
10	Eric Beers	21	3	4	4	12	12	18	27	28	30	41	1	9	24	26	11	1888
11	Matt Hirschman	35	8	14	33	9	24	**16**	13	4	26	7	8*	13	16	14	12	1873
12	Chuck Hossfeld	2*	15	7	26	27	14	12	2	19	18	31	16	14	20	31	18	1852
13	Richard Houlihan	9	17	13	16	14	19	8	16	13	28	23	17	16	19	12	26	1833
14	Doug Coby	16	1*	9	17	21	33	24	DNQ	20	20	5	7	33	11	23	13	1792
15	Jimmy Blewett	20	29	17	**14**	2*	42	9	DNQ	24	5	1	32	11	28	2	30	1754
16	Jamie Tomaino	8	19	23	13	13	25	17	18	12	29	34	30	26	12	22	16	1693
17	Ken Barry	29	16	18	10	31	35	11	DNQ	2	24	33	21	15	30	32	2	1642
18	Ron Yuhas Jr.	23	14	DNQ	9	29	15	29	DNQ	15	8	6	24	37	7	17	21	1614
19	Ron Silk	11	DNQ	DNQ	19	20	10	26	22	25	11	29	34	12	22	7	8	1599
20	Anthony Sesely	22	DNQ	20	15	8	21	23	21	11	19	19	31	18	9	29	24	1596
21	Reggie Ruggiero	3	13	24	7	11	3			9	DNQ	38	2	38		1	27	1583
22	Rob Summers	24	5	21	35	19	30	13	5	26	25	42		32	26	11	28	1475
23	John Blewett III	36	21		11	1	1			23	22		3	1		20	5	1439
24	Danny Sammons	31	10	DNQ	27	26	23	7	DNQ	DNQ	33	24	35	21	25	10	17	1426
25	Jimmy Storace	25	DNQ	25	25	DNQ	16	27	DNQ	14	32	20	36	22	10	DNQ	19	1295
26	Steve Whitt	32	20	15	8	25	28	15	DNQ	30	14	40	15	20				1261
27	Kevin Goodale	34	31	22	23	22	34		DNQ	27	DNQ	8	25	36		13	14	1214
28	Wade Cole	12	DNQ	28	28	DNQ	32	22	DNQ	DNQ	23	21	27	28	17	DNQ	23	1192
29	Chris Pasteryak	DNQ	24		30	DNQ				3	12		13	23	6	8	15	1140
30	Jon McKennedy	10	DNQ	10	DNQ	DNQ	26	14		29	13	DNQ	18	34		DNQ	32	1090
31	Jake Marosz	DNQ	DNQ	26	DNQ	DNQ	22	20	DNQ	DNQ	DNQ	DNQ	29	35	15	DNQ	DNQ	880
32	Glenn Tyler	37	DNQ	27	24		37	25	23	DNQ			DNQ	24	29	DNQ	DNQ	838
33	Tom Bolles	DNQ			DNQ	15				10	4		20			DNQ	20	702
34	Renee Dupuis	26	22		22	DNQ	18				17		23			27		686
35	Richard Savary		DNQ		31	18	27				15	43				15		604
36	Dave Etheridge	19	32		21	DNQ								17	21	DNQ	DNQ	602
37	Eric Berndt	30	DNQ		DNQ					DNQ	DNQ		26		8	DNQ	29	576
38	Mike Andrews	7	23	DNQ					6			37			DNQ			561
39	Rick Fuller	27	18				31						10	31			31	535
40	Ken Bouchard	13			DNQ		17				27		DNQ	25		DNQ		532
41	Joe Hartmann	DNQ	DNQ	DNQ	20	DNQ	20	28	15	DNQ								519
42	Carl Pasteryak	DNQ	DNQ			17				DNQ	16		22			28		505
43	Tony Ferrante Jr.				34				12				5			25		431
44	Dennis Charette	DNQ^{1}	DNQ^{1}		DNQ^{1}	28				DNQ^{1}					13			309
45	Alex Hoag						13	DNQ			DNQ			41				286
46	Billy Pauch Jr.														DNQ^{1}	21	DNQ^{1}	231
47	Ken Heagy	DNQ^{1}	DNQ^{1}	DNQ^{1}	DNQ^{1}				26			DNQ^{1}						225
48	Kirk Alexander		26			DNQ				18								222
49	Mike Christopher	14	25															209
50	Kenny Horton		33			30				31								207
51	Tom Rogers Jr.								14								DNQ^{1}	173
52	Tommy Cloce	DNQ^{1}	DNQ^{1}	19			DNQ^{1}											163
53	Frank Ruocco		30			DNQ^{1}				DNQ^{1}								147
54	Chuck Steuer								7									146
55	Howie Brode								8									142
56	Tony Stewart						9											138
57	Roy Seidell Jr.				DNQ^{1}					DNQ^{1}			DNQ^{1}			DNQ^{1}		133
58	Joseph Mongeau	DNQ^{1}	DNQ^{1}	DNQ^{1}	DNQ^{1}	DNQ^{1}	DNQ^{1}											129
59	Nevin George						41							27				122
60	Tommy Cravenho Jr.													19				106
61	John Denniston								24									91
62	Bobby Grigas III															24		91
63	Wayne Anderson								25									88
64	Andy Seuss						DNQ^{1}							39				80
65	J. R. Bertuccio								28									79
66	Bobby Santos III						29											76
67	Frank Vigliarolo Jr.								DNQ^{1}									76
68	Brian Loftin											32^{2}		29				76
69	Larry Altholtz								DNQ^{1}									67
70	Bill Park								DNQ^{1}									61
71	Carl Edwards						39											46
72	Brian Cranmer						40											43
73	Todd Bodine													40				43
Drivers ineligible for NWMT points, because at the combined event at Martinsville they chose to drive for NWSMT points
	Tim Brown											9						
	Gene Pack											10						
	Michael Clifton											11						
	Burt Myers											13						
	Jay Foley											18						
	Jamie Tomaino Jr.											22						
	L. W. Miller											25						
	Frank Fleming											26						
	Jason Myers											28						
	Bobby Hutchens											30						
	Brian King											35						
	Kevin Powell											36						
	Junior Miller											39						
	Randy Butner											DNQ						
	Brandon Hire											DNQ						
	Brian Pack											DNQ						
Pos	Driver	THO	STA	JEN	THO	STA	NHA	HOL	RIV	STA	THO	MAR	THO	NHA	WFD	THO	STA	Points

- ^{1} – Dennis Charette, Billy Pauch Jr., Ken Heagy, Tom Rogers Jr., Tommy Cloce, Frank Ruocco, Roy Seidell Jr., Joseph Mongeau, Andy Seuss, Frank Vigliarolo Jr., Larry Altholtz, and Bill Park received championship points, despite the fact that the driver did not qualify for the race.
- ^{2} – Scored points towards the Whelen Southern Modified Tour.

== See also ==
- 2006 NASCAR Nextel Cup Series
- 2006 NASCAR Busch Series
- 2006 NASCAR Craftsman Truck Series
- 2006 ARCA Re/Max Series
- 2006 NASCAR Whelen Southern Modified Tour
