= 2005 NASCAR Whelen Modified Tour =

The 2005 NASCAR Whelen Modified Tour was the 21st season of the Whelen Modified Tour (WMT), and the first with Whelen Engineering as the title sponsor. It began with the Icebreaker 150 at Thompson Speedway Motorsports Park on April 10. It ended with the World Series of Auto Racing Pres. by Whelen at Thompson again on October 30. Tony Hirschman Jr., who entered the season as the defending Drivers' Champion, won his fifth and final championship after 18 races, seventeen points ahead of Ted Christopher.

== Schedule ==
No.	Race title	Track	Date
1	Icebreaker 150	Thompson Speedway Motorsports Park, Thompson, Connecticut	April 10
2	Tech Net Spring Sizzler Presented by Carquest	Stafford Motor Speedway, Stafford, Connecticut	April 24
3	Miller Lite 150	Riverhead Raceway, Riverhead, New York	June 4
4	Whelen Modified 150	Waterford Speedbowl, Waterford, Connecticut	June 25
5	Haynes Materials 150	Stafford Motor Speedway, Stafford, Connecticut	July 3
6	Wheeler Brothers 150	Jennerstown Speedway, Jennerstown, Pennsylvania	July 9
7	New England 100	New Hampshire Motor Speedway, Loudon, New Hampshire	July 15
8	Connecticut Classic 150	Beech Ridge Motor Speedway, Scarborough, Maine	July 23
9	New England Dodge Dealers 150	Seekonk Speedway, Seekonk, Massachusetts	June 29
10	Riverhead 200	Riverhead Raceway, Riverhead, New York	August 6
11	New England Dodge Dealers 150	Stafford Motor Speedway, Stafford, Connecticut	August 12
12	Budweiser 150 Presented by N.E. Dodge Dealers	Thompson Speedway Motorsports Park, Thompson, Connecticut	August 18
13	Big Y World Class Market 150	Waterford Speedbowl, Waterford, Connecticut	August 27
14	Made In America Whelen 300 (Note: The Made In America Whelen 300 was held as a combined event, with competitors from the Whelen Modified Tour competing along with competitors for the Whelen Southern Modified Tour. The race was run with a series-based point distribution, where drivers received points and statistical credit for their finish relative to other drivers in their series, not to the whole field in general.)	Martinsville Speedway, Martinsville, Virginia	September 3
15	Thompson Sunoco 300	Thompson Speedway Motorsports Park, Thompson, Connecticut	September 11
16	Sylvania 100 Presented by Lowe's	New Hampshire Motor Speedway, Loudon, New Hampshire	September 16
17	CarQuest Fall Final	Stafford Motor Speedway, Stafford, Connecticut	October 2
18	World Series of Auto Racing Pres. by Whelen	Thompson Speedway Motorsports Park, Thompson, Connecticut	October 30

== Results and standings ==
=== Races ===
No.	Race	Pole position	Most laps led	Winning driver	Manufacturer
1	Icebreaker 150	Chuck Hossfeld	Ted Christopher	Ted Christopher	Chevrolet
2	Tech Net Spring Sizzler Presented by Carquest	Donny Lia	Tony Hirschman Jr.	Tony Hirschman Jr.	Chevrolet
3	Miller Lite 150	Eric Beers	Ted Christopher	Ted Christopher	Chevrolet
4	Whelen Modified 150	Tony Hirschman Jr.	Donny Lia	Donny Lia	Chevrolet
5	Haynes Materials 150	Donny Lia	Doug Coby	Ted Christopher	Chevrolet
6	Wheeler Brothers 150	Tony Hirschman Jr.	Tony Hirschman Jr.	Tony Hirschman Jr.	Chevrolet
7	New England 100	Ted Christopher	Ted Christopher	Ted Christopher	Chevrolet
8	Connecticut Classic 150	Tony Hirschman Jr.	Jerry Marquis	Jerry Marquis	Dodge
9	New England Dodge Dealers 150	Eric Beers	Eric Beers	Eric Beers	Chevrolet
10	Riverhead 200	John Blewett III	Donny Lia	Donny Lia	Chevrolet
11	New England Dodge Dealers 150	Tony Hirschman Jr.	Mike Stefanik	Tony Hirschman Jr.	Chevrolet
12	Budweiser 150 Presented by N.E. Dodge Dealers	Tony Hirschman Jr.	Doug Coby	Tony Hirschman Jr.	Chevrolet
13	Big Y World Class Market 150	Tony Hirschman Jr.	Jerry Marquis	Jerry Marquis	Dodge
14	Made In America Whelen 300	Chuck Hossfeld	Ted Christopher	Ted Christopher	Chevrolet
15	Thompson Sunoco 300	Tony Hirschman Jr.	Tony Hirschman Jr.	Ted Christopher	Chevrolet
16	Sylvania 100 Presented by Lowe's	Doug Coby	Ted Christopher	Ted Christopher	Chevrolet
17	CarQuest Fall Final	Donny Lia	Tony Hirschman Jr.	Tony Hirschman Jr.	Chevrolet
18	World Series of Auto Racing Pres. by Whelen	Jerry Marquis	John Blewett III	Jerry Marquis	Dodge

=== Drivers' championship ===
(key) Bold - Pole position awarded by time. Italics - Pole position set by final practice results or rainout. * – Most laps led.

Pos	Driver	THO	STA	RIV	WFD	STA	JEN	NHA	BEE	SEE	RIV	STA	THO	WFD	MAR	THO	NHA	STA	THO	Points
1	Tony Hirschman Jr.	11	1*	9	**12**	24	**1***	2	**2**	4	2	**1**	**1**	**21**	7	**2***	6	1*	12	2749
2	Ted Christopher	1*	5	1*	2	1	23	1*	5	17	10	2	20	6	1*	1	1*	5	30	2731
3	Chuck Hossfeld	**3**	6	12	6	2	2	7	23	6	4	5	5	20	**18**	6	3	3	2	2666
4	Jerry Marquis	21	27	4	4	26	4	8	1*	3	3	3	7	1*	11	4	12	4	**1**	2647
5	Eric Beers	29		**2**	3	7	14	3	3	**1***	5	6	3	7	4	10	9	7	25	2470
6	Donny Lia	17	**15**	3	1**	**10**	13	14	11	10	1*	9	9	3	29	20	8	**2**	17	2469
7	Doug Coby	9	24	17	10	3*	12	4	14	5	22	25	14*	2	5	19	7	29	3	2327
8	Rick Fuller	5	18	7	14	5	6	6	27	9	13	29	2	19	15	13	26	17	19	2236
9	Mike Christopher	24	11	13	11	17	15	9	8	15	7	16	4	16	8	31	27	18	4	2202
10	Zach Sylvester	2	2	14	23	23	7	17	10	8	6	11	18	23	24	22	30	21	11	2178
11	Jamie Tomaino	27	7	15	27	4	5	31	6	21	DNQ	10	16	8	6	9	20	8	23	2145
12	Ed Flemke Jr.	23	17	8	15	14	3	16	28	23	20	7	27	4	32	3	5	24	21	2139
13	Dave Etheridge	10	20	DNQ	28	22		22	9	13	8	19	10	9	28	11	18	14	18	1931
14	Steve Whitt	22	DNQ	DNQ	5	DNQ	18	5	4	24	14	30	21	14	9	23	15	27	10	1910
15	Tyler Haydt	8	DNQ	16	19	DNQ	26	25	7	22	17	26	24	5	35	12	22	22	16	1865
16	Kevin Goodale	14	29	DNQ	DNQ	25	16	29	21	25	15	13	22	15	37	16	21	32	14	1737
17	Mike Stefanik	4	33	5		18		11			9	4*	23		2	5	2	31	6	1725
18	Renee Dupuis	16	16	18	25	15	27	32	18	28	DNQ	27	19	17	22	26	32	19	26	1710
19	Gregg Shivers	15	21	21	9		9	24	17	19	19	21	25	18	27	32		30	28	1634
20	Richard Houlihan	28	25	23	DNQ	19		23	15	14	16	20	31	11		34	29	23	20	1519
21	John Blewett III	31						40	20	2	**27**	8	6	28	3	18	10	9	13*	1509
22	Kevin Konopka	26	14	26	17	DNQ	25	13	13	29	DNQ	28	32	12	30	21	33			1492
23	Jimmy Storace	19	23	DNQ	29	16	22	33	24	18	DNQ		17	27	DNQ	36	19		22	1469
24	Wade Cole	20	DNQ	DNQ	DNQ	DNQ	20	26	19	30	DNQ	DNQ	15	24	40	28	23	DNQ	DNQ	1359
25	Ken Barry	12	28	10	30	29	11	21	26	20						14		12	9	1293
26	Nevin George	7	12	24	26	21	24	10	25		24						14		DNQ	1132
27	Jake Marosz	DNQ	DNQ	DNQ	DNQ	DNQ	28	27	22	DNQ	DNQ		30	30	DNQ	25	24	DNQ	DNQ	1122
28	Chris Kopec	6	10	19	13	27	8	20	12	16										1083
29	Tony Ferrante Jr.	35	13	11		12					28		11			7		11	7	1070
30	Tommy Cloce	18	22	25	24	30	17	18	16								13		29	994
31	Charlie Pasteryak	37	8			6		15								29	11	6	5	973
32	Jimmy Blewett			20				30			18	22	12			33	25	13	27	867
33	Mike Mouller	34	19		DNQ	DNQ		28				DNQ	33	13		24	36	DNQ	DNQ	849
34	Tom Bolles	38	9			13						12	8			30		DNQ	DNQ	775
35	Reggie Ruggiero		4			9		35				18			36		38	10		739
36	Matt Hirschman				8		10			27		17	28	22					24	737
37	Carl Pasteryak					11				26		24	DNQ			17		15	31	667
38	Jeff Malave	33										14					17	16	15	530
39	Eric Berndt	32	32		21	20				12		DNQ								528
40	Anthony Sesely												13		16		16	DNQ		479
41	Ken Bouchard	25	31					34								15	31		DNQ	456
42	Chris Pasteryak				20							15	29	10						431
43	Darrin Stevens	DNQ^{1}	DNQ^{1}	DNQ^{1}	DNQ^{1}	DNQ^{1}	26	38												400
44	Tommy Cravenho Jr.				7					7						27				374
45	Howie Brode	30	DNQ	DNQ							12							DNQ	DNQ	359
46	Frank Ruocco		30			28						23						26		331
47	Roy Seidell Jr.	DNQ^{1}	DNQ^{1}			DNQ^{1}							DNQ^{1}			35		DNQ^{1}		316
48	Todd Szegedy		3												10					299
49	Mike Ewanitsko																4	DNQ	32	288
50	Bo Gunning	13	26			31														279
51	Kelly McDougall	DNQ^{1}	DNQ^{1}			DNQ^{1}						DNQ^{1}	DNQ^{1}					DNQ^{1}		273
52	Wayne Anderson			28							21							25		267
53	James Civali				16	8														257
54	Justin Gaydosh	DNQ			22									26				DNQ		253
55	Chuck Steuer			6							25									238
56	Richie Coy						21								21^{2}					218
57	Danny Knoll	DNQ^{1}	DNQ^{1}			DNQ^{1}									38					211
58	Bill Park			DNQ^{1}							11									206
59	Frank Vordermeier	DNQ^{1}	DNQ^{1}	DNQ^{1}				37												205
60	Alex Hoag							36							23				8	197
61	Rob Summers							19						25			35			194
62	Dennis Gada				18									29						185
63	Joe Hartmann			DNQ^{1}									DNQ^{1}						DNQ^{1}	183
64	Frank Vigliarolo Jr.			22							26									182
65	Zane Zeiner											31	26							155
66	Chris Young			27							DNQ^{1}									155
67	Bob Polverai															8				142
68	Tom Rogers Jr.			DNQ^{1}							DNQ^{1}									134
69	Dave Berghman									11										130
70	Brian Loftin							12							12^{2}					127
71	Daren Scherer						19								26^{2}					106
72	Kenny Horton																	20		103
73	John Fortin										23									94
74	Steve Park																	28		79
75	Bobby Santos III																	DNQ^{1}		64
76	Dan Jivanelli			DNQ^{1}																61
77	Buck Catalano	36																		55
78	Larry Altholz										DNQ^{1}									52
79	Brian Cranmer														43^{2}	37				52
80	Ryan Seaman							39									34			46
81	Earl Paules	DNQ^{1}																		43
82	Ron Silk																DNQ^{1}			43
83	Todd Bodine																28			0
84	Eddie MacDonald																37			0
85	Don Wagner																39			0
	Kevin Powell														DNQ					
Drivers ineligible for NWMT points, because at the combined event at Martinsville they chose to drive for NWSMT points
	Jay Foley														13					
	Junior Miller														14					
	Tim Brown														17					
	Jay Hedgecock														19					
	Randy Butner														20					
	Gene Pack														25					
	Bobby Hutchens														31					
	Frank Fleming														33					
	Burt Myers														34					
	Brian Pack														39					
	Michael Clifton														41					
	Jamie Tomaino Jr.														42					
Pos	Driver	THO	STA	RIV	WFD	STA	JEN	NHA	BEE	SEE	RIV	STA	THO	WFD	MAR	THO	NHA	STA	THO	Points

- ^{1} – Received championship points, despite the fact that the driver did not qualify for the race.
- ^{2} – Scored points towards the Whelen Southern Modified Tour.

== See also ==
- 2005 NASCAR Nextel Cup Series
- 2005 NASCAR Busch Series
- 2005 NASCAR Craftsman Truck Series
- 2005 ARCA Re/Max Series
- 2005 NASCAR Whelen Southern Modified Tour
