= Tyler Haydt =

American racing driver

- Nationality: American
- Born: March 28, 1985 (age 41) Kunkletown, Pennsylvania, U.S.

NASCAR Whelen Modified Tour career
- Debut season: 2005
- Years active: 2005
- Starts: 15
- Championships: 0
- Wins: 0
- Poles: 0
- Best finish: 15th in 2005
- Statistics up to date as of August 27, 2024.

Tyler Haydt (born March 28, 1985) is an American former professional stock car racing driver and team owner who currently fields the No. 16 for Ron Silk in the NASCAR Whelen Modified Tour.

Haydt has previously competed in the Modified Tour, having run only one season in 2005, where he won rookie of the year honors before retiring at the end of the following year to go into a team ownership role in 2022 with Joe Yannone.

Haydt has also competed in series such as the now defunct NASCAR Whelen Southern Modified Tour, the Race of Champions Asphalt Modified Tour, and the World Series of Asphalt Stock Car Racing.

== Motorsports results ==
=== NASCAR ===
(key) (Bold – Pole position awarded by qualifying time. Italics – Pole position earned by points standings or practice time. * – Most laps led.)

==== Whelen Modified Tour ====
NASCAR Whelen Modified Tour results
Year	Team	No.	Make	1	2	3	4	5	6	7	8	9	10	11	12	13	14	15	16	17	18	NWMTC	Pts	Ref
2005	Don King	28	Chevy	TMP; 8	STA; DNQ	RIV; 16	WFD; 19	STA; DNQ	JEN; 29	NHA; 25	BEE; 7	SEE; 22	RIV; 17	STA; 26	TMP; 24	WFD; 5	MAR; 23	TMP; 12	NHA; 22	STA; 22	TMP; 16	15th	1865	

==== Whelen Southern Modified Tour ====
NASCAR Whelen Southern Modified Tour results
Year	Car owner	No.	Make	1	2	3	4	5	6	7	8	9	10	11	12	13	NSWMTC	Pts	Ref
2006	Tyler Haydt	26	Chevy	CRW	GRE	CRW	DUB	CRW	BGS	MAR	CRW	ACE	CRW	HCY; 26	DUB	SNM	44th	85	
