= Flemington Speedway =

Racetrack

Coordinates: 40°31′35″N 74°51′10″W

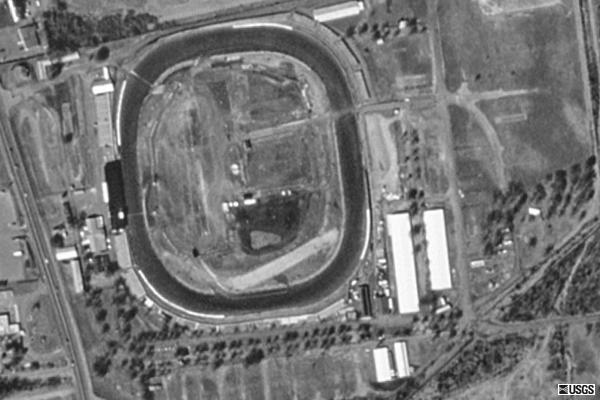
- Aerial photo of the track from 1995
- Location: Flemington, New Jersey
- Coordinates: 40.5266, -74.8534
- Opened: 1915
- Closed: 2002
- Former names: Flemington Fair Speedway (1915–1990)
- Major events: Stevens Beil / Genuine Car Parts 150 (1995–1998); Race of Champions (Modified) (1992–1995)

Rectangle Oval
- Surface: Asphalt
- Length: 0.621 mi (1.000 km)
- Turns: 4
- Banking: Semi-banked
- Race lap record: 0:18.817 (Stacy Compton, Impact Motorsports, 1998, NASCAR Craftsman Truck Series)

Flemington Speedway was a motor racing circuit in Flemington, New Jersey which operated from 1915 to 2002. The track was once known for being the fastest 5/8-mile dirt track in the United States.

== Early history ==
Flemington Speedway was created as a mid-nineteenth century fairgrounds horse track hosting horse racing events during the Hunterdon County 4-H Agricultural Fair starting in 1848. It was a half mile, four-cornered dirt oval. Motorcycles first raced on this horse track in 1911, and the "Speedway" hosted its first automobile race in 1915 as a half mile dirt oval. The first race was promoted and won by Ira Vail. The track's grandstand opened in 1917 and remained standing until the track was demolished in January 2005. Auto races were a nearly annual event at Flemington Fair. Stock Car Races became the weekly Saturday night featured attraction when lights were added in 1955. The track was reconfigured over the 1966-1967 off-season into a (nearly) 5/8 mile, semi-banked rounded rectangle, nicknamed "The Square." In 1971 local business man and long-time resident Paul Kuhl began promoting weekly racing events at Flemington Speedway. Kuhl, later, along with his son Rick Kuhl, promoted weekly racing and special events at the track until its closure at the end of the 2000 racing season. Until the end of the 2000 racing season, Flemington Fairgrounds Speedway stood as the oldest operating race track to hold weekly racing events (title now held by the Orange County Fair Speedway). The track remained dirt until the end of the 1990 season when the decision was made to pave the track due to local resident / business complaints and EPA standards.

== Life as a paved track ==
After being paved, speeds at the track dramatically increased. The higher speeds led to "a series of horrible crashes," leaving drivers, such as future NASCAR Sprint Cup team owner Ray Evernham, severely injured. After talking to crew chiefs and drivers, track officials decided to add foam blocks to lessen the impact of crashes. The foam bricks allowed crashes at up to 140 mph (230 km/h) leaving no serious injuries.

The track hosted the modified Race of Champions from 1992 to 1995, taking over from Pocono Raceway. The race moved to Oswego Speedway in Oswego, New York from 1996 to 2014, 2016. In 2015 at Chemung Speedrome.

The track also hosted the NASCAR Craftsman Truck Series for four races, from 1995 to 1998. All four races were won by Chevrolet, with Ron Hornaday Jr. winning two.

The last Pro-Touring series to race at the speedway was the then ARCA Bondo/Mar-Hyde Series (now ARCA Menards Series) "Flemington ARCA 150". The winner was Frank Kimmel, who would go on to win his first series title that season. The race was to be run on August 14, 1999, but due to a severe thunderstorm that hit the track after qualifying, the race was run the next day before a nearly empty house. It was the only ARCA race at the Speedway.

Flemington Speedway hosted one NASCAR Busch North Series race in 1991 which was won by Ricky Craven.

The facility also hosted six NASCAR Whelen Modified Tour races between 1991 and 1998.

The track continuously lost money after being paved, and closed on November 8, 2002. The track was sold off to developers and demolished in early January 2005. A multi-use development called Raritan Town Center now occupies the surrounding area, and a Lowe's store sits on the defunct speedway property.

== Special Events ==
The speedway hosted one of a handful of public appearances by 1992 presidential candidate H. Ross Perot. More than 25,000 people attended and tied up local roads for hours.

== Post-Racing Existence ==
In 1999, the Flemington Fair ceased its annual operation soon followed by the closing of the speedway. In 2002, teen vandals set fire to the fairgrounds office building causing damage to several structures on the property. The track was sold off to developers and demolished in early January 2005. A multi-use development called Raritan Town Center now occupies the surrounding area, and a Lowe's store sits on the defunct speedway property.

=== NASCAR Craftsman Truck Series history ===
Season	Date	Race	Winning driver	Truck Model
1995	August 19	Stevens Beil / Genuine Car Parts 150	Ron Hornaday Jr.	Chevrolet
1996	August 10	Stevens Beil / Genuine Car Parts 200	Mike Skinner	Chevrolet
1997	August 9	Stevens Beil / Genuine Car Parts 200	Ron Hornaday Jr.	Chevrolet
1998	August 8	Stevens Beil / Genuine Car Parts 200	Terry Cook	Chevrolet
