= Wall Stadium =

Racetrack

Coordinates: 40°10′31″N 74°6′55″W

The Roar of the Jersey Shore
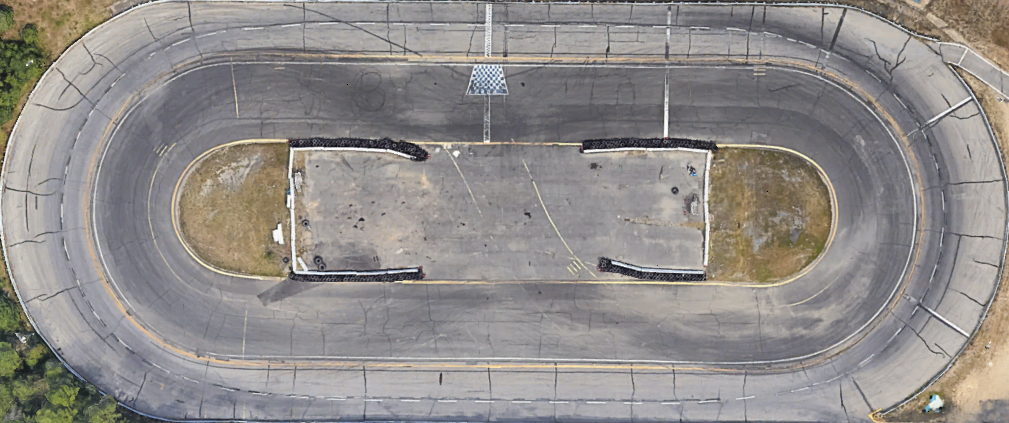
- Location: Wall Township, New Jersey
- Opened: 1950
- Former names: Wall Township Speedway
- Major events: Current: Turkey Derby (1974-present); Garden State Classic (1957-present); Former: NASCAR Whelen Modified Tour; Jersey Shore 150 (2003-2004, 2007, 2019, 2022-2023); NASCAR Grand National Series (1958); NASCAR Convertible Series (1956)
- Website: https://www.wall-stadium.com/

Wall Stadium (briefly known as Wall Township Speedway) is a 1/3-mile high banked (30° in corners) paved oval track in Wall Township, New Jersey, United States. The track opened to the public in the spring of 1950 and has operated for at least a part of every year since. The track was an early home to racing stars Ray Evernham and the Truex family of Martin Sr., Martin Jr. and Ryan Truex. Also, it hosted a NASCAR Convertible Division race in 1956 and a NASCAR Grand National Series event in 1958. The more prominent drivers over the years have included Gil Hearne (eight-time champion), Tommie Elliott (the youngest driver ever to race in NASCAR's highest division) and Charlie Kremer, Jr. (both four-time champions), John Blewett III, Jimmy Blewett (four-time champion), Jimmy Spencer (Garden State Classic winner), Tony Siscone (six-time champion), Richie Evans, and Charlie Jarzombek (Garden State Classic winner). Wall Stadium is also known for hosting Round 4: The Gauntlet of the Formula DRIFT Pro Championship.

== History ==
=== Origins ===
Founders Tom and Jennie Nicol sought to build their own racetrack after enjoying stock car racing at Long Branch Speedway. The couple bought 55 acres of land off Route 34 in Wall Township and built a one-third mile oval with 30° banking in the turns, unheard of at the time. Racing began in 1950 with the annual Turkey Derby capping each season on the Saturday following Thanksgiving beginning in 1974.

=== New ownership ===
After the 2001 season, the late Jennie Nicol's son Tucker (Thomas Nicol, Jr.) decided to sell the speedway and, it was purchased by Timothy Shinn. His co-owners were Tom Mauser, Joe Sanzari, and Fletcher Creamer for the 2002 season. The track was temporarily retitled Wall Township Speedway. After two months, Mauser was dismissed as the Track Operations Manager. In 2004, Fred Archer came to the fold as co-owner. By 2005, car counts and capacity crowd started to decline and, there were rumors swirling about the track's pending demise.

=== Demise ===
After the 2007 season, several employees were laid off. The track closed on March 14, 2008, with the track's marquee reading "CLOSED FOR GOOD".

=== Revival ===
After eleven months sitting inactive, former track operations manager Jim Morton secured a lease to operate the race track for one race, the traditional season ending Turkey Derby in November 2008, and the crowd was overwhelming for what was the track's only race of the year.

The track officially reopened for a full season of racing in 2009, capped by the Turkey Derby. The name was changed back to the familiar "Wall Stadium".

The 2010 season started as usual, but on September 2, 2010, the track closed once more, due to the expiration of Morton's lease on the property. The marquee, which earlier that week had noted the weekend's upcoming races, simply read "Racing cancelled till further notice". However, the 37th annual Turkey Derby ran as scheduled on November 26 and 27, under the terms of a short-term lease to Don Ling and the Blewett family. The track was put up for sale shortly thereafter with an asking price of $18 million.

Racing resumed in 2011 under new management. Cliff Krause of Holmdel signed a one-year lease with track owners to conduct a full schedule of races.

After running a full schedule of races, Krause secured a three-year extension on the track's lease after the 2011 Turkey Derby. After its three-year deal, the Krauses signed one more agreement for 2015. Annual lease renewals have been signed in subsequent years.

A 1/5-mile oval flat track was added for ATQMRA and Karting events.

=== Modifieds dropped from schedule ===
For several years, two different Modified classes competed at Wall Stadium, the more traditional "Tour Type" Modifieds, considered to be the top tier series, and the Modified Affordable Division (MAD), similar to the Stafford Motor Speedway SK Modified division, using small block engines and narrower tires, to reduce costs. Because of a purse structure dispute, in 1993, the Tour Type Modified division left as the weekly feature attraction at the track for the now defunct Flemington Speedway. Currently, the Modified division has rules similar to Stafford's SK Modified, although Tour Type cars participate in the Turkey Derby.

== Events ==
=== NASCAR Whelen Modified Tour ===
In the 2003 season, Wall hosted a NASCAR (then Featherlite) Modified Tour event. The race was contested at 150 laps, and the race was held the next year (2004), but was quickly dropped from their future scheduling. In 2007, the cars returned to the speedway, after being absent from the schedule for two seasons. That year it hosted a "Flash" event with a pair of 50 lap races, and the feature being the final 50. The NASCAR Modified Tour wasn't scheduled again for the following season in 2008. In 2019 after a 12-year absence, the NASCAR Modifieds returned to Wall for one race out of their year. The event was canceled from the schedule due to the COVID-19 pandemic in 2020, and was not seen on the 2021 schedule. After a 2 year absence, the Modified Tour came back to Wall in 2022, and returned once more in 2023.

=== Turkey Derby ===
After the 1974 season, the management/staff added a race for the Thanksgiving weekend, entitled "Turkey Derby", a 150-lap open competition race for Modified stock cars which attracted many of the top drivers in the division. After a successful debut, the race grew in stature and popularity and, in 1981, attracted a record field of 75 cars including NASCAR National Champion Richie Evans. From 1974 to 1992, the Modified race was contested as a 150-lap event. When the years went by, the format had been changed to three 50 lap events, if the driver finishes in a certain spot, he will be declared the overall winner. The Tour Type Modifieds (to refer to big block engines, similar to that of the Valenti Modified Racing Series and the NASCAR Whelen Modified Tour cars), returned in 2002 it was 150 laps. In 2004, it was 125 laps. From 2004 to 2009, it was 100; since 2010, it has been its original 150 lap length. The race was not held in 2020 because of Gov. Phil Murphy's restrictions on events due to the pandemic, and two were held in 2021, one to open the season in March and one to close the season in November.

=== Garden State Classic ===
The Garden State Classic was established in 1957. The format of the event was first consisted of a 300-lap event, originally a NASCAR National Championship Modified race. When the 1980s started, it was cut to 200 laps (to eliminate pit stops, which were impractical at the track, and save the race teams much additional expense. The purse remained the same), 100 laps (1993–2002), Twin 50's (2003), 100 laps (2004–2007), 150 (2009–2010), and 125 laps (2011–present).
