= Chemung Speedrome =

Racetrack in New York, United States

Spencer Speedway
- Location: Chemung, New York
- Coordinates: 42.0109°N 76.6251°W
- Owner: John White
- Operator: George Nichols and Dan Mathews
- Opened: 1951
- Website: chemungspeedrome.com

Oval
- Surface: Asphalt
- Length: .6 km (0.37 mi)
- Turns: 4

The Chemung Speedrome is a 3/8-mile asphalt racetrack in the Southern Tier region of New York, United States. It is the home track of former NASCAR stars Geoff, Brett and Todd Bodine.

== Overview ==
Eli Bodine Jr. and Eli Bodine Sr., father and grandfather of Geoff, Brett and Todd, built the originally dirt-surfaced oval in a Town of Chemung corn field in 1951. The surface was later paved and the racetrack continued in operation until the Bodine family closed it in 1978.

Robert Stapleton purchased the track in 1985, but the facility remained dormant until he started to rebuild in 1997, and in 2000 the track held its inaugural event. In 2005 John White, owner of Spencer Speedway in Williamson, New York, joined Stapleton as a partner. White eventually took full ownership of the venue.

From 2018 through 2025, Ray Hodge operated the facility, after which he joined the management team at Shangri-La II Speedway. In April 2026, former drivers George Nichols and Dan Mathews announced they had leased the facility for the upcoming racing season, with a two or three-year option to renew.

== Events held at the Speedrome ==
The track currently hosts: Modifieds, Hobby Stocks, Super Stocks, and 4-cylinders.

Chemung Speedrome had hosted in the past: The NASCAR Whelen Modified Tour, the ISMA Super Modifieds, USAR Hooters Pro Cup Series, SST Modified Tour, Cup Lite Racing Series, USAC Ford Focus Midget Series. NASCAR Advance Auto Parts Weekly Series, INEX Legends, Bandoleros, and Race of Champions Modified Tour.

== Facilities ==
The Chemung Speedrome features all-new TV quality Musco Lighting, a 3000-seat main grandstand, a 28-stall paved pit lane and much more. The facility is situated on 38 acres (150,000 m^{2}).
