= Lake Erie Speedway =

Race track in Pennsylvania

- Location: Greenfield Township, Erie County, Pennsylvania
- Coordinates: 42°8′46″N 79°49′43″W
- Owner: Lake Erie Promotions, Inc.
- Operator: A.J. Moore
- Opened: 21 June 2002; 23 years ago
- Major events: Former: X-1R Pro Cup Series (2004–2007); NASCAR Busch East/North Series (2003–2006); ARCA RE/Max Series (2003–2005); NASCAR Whelen Modified Tour (2003–2004); ASA National Tour (2003–2004)

Conventional Oval (2002–present)
- Surface: Asphalt
- Length: 0.37 mi (0.6 km)
- Turns: 4
- Banking: 6-12 degrees (turns), 6 degrees in straights

Bandolero Oval (2002–present)
- Surface: Asphalt
- Length: 0.402 km (0.250 mi)
- Turns: 4

Lake Erie Speedway is a 0.375 mi (0.604 km) paved, banked oval race track which opened on June 21, 2002 in Erie County, Pennsylvania south of North East, Pennsylvania, United States. It was a member of the NASCAR Whelen All-American Series from 2002 to 2013 when the track dropped the NASCAR sanctioning body and started only holding a few special event races a year as an unsanctioned track. Lake Erie Speedway previously ran five weekly race divisions including: Modifieds, Street Stocks, Compacts, Legends, and Bandoleros.

The track formerly hosted the ARCA RE/MAX Series, the NASCAR Busch East/North Series, the NASCAR Winston Modified Tour, ASA National Tour and CARS Hooters Pro Cup Series.

In June 2025, the track named Branden Kaczay as the general manager.

Division Champions
Year	Legends	Street Stocks	Bandoleros	Compacts	Modifieds
2012	Brandon DeBrakeleer	Kaity Kicinski	Wesley McCray	Dan Bittinger	Dave McAvoy
2011	Brandon DeBrakeleer	Lexi Wilson	Melissa Brockman	Greg Irish	Dave McAvoy
2010	Jeremy Haudricourt	Lexi Wilson	Anthony Riforgiato	Jonathon Breads	James-Paul Weisser
2009	Steve Sunday	Jeff Campbell	Brandon DeBrakeleer	Jonathon Breads	Eric McCray
2008	Justin Hines	Dave Wilson Jr.	Nathan Carlson	Jonathon Breads	Scott Bayle
2007	Justin Hines	Eric Hadley	Nathan Carlson	Dave McAvoy	
2006	JD Trenary	Terry Akerly	James-Paul Weisser	Eric McCray	
2005	Chris Bailey Jr.	David Krawczyk	Grant Kirik		
2004	James Rader	Paul Thrasher	Chris Bailey Jr.		
2003	James Rader	Cory Lischer	Bryanne Downes		
2002	Jay Wesley Swartout	Kevin Weise	Zack Downes		Neil Hopkins
