= Holland Speedway =

Motorsport venue in Holland, New York

- Location: Holland, New York
- Coordinates: 42.6314°N 78.5523°W
- Owner: Ronald P. Bennett, Gordon Becker
- Operator: Richard Bennett Jr.
- Opened: 1960
- Former names: Holland International Speedway, The Track at Hillside Buffalo
- Website: www.hollandsportscomplex.com

Oval
- Surface: Asphalt
- Length: .6 km (0.37 mi)
- Turns: 4
- Banking: High

Figure 8
- Surface: Asphalt
- Length: .4 km (0.25 mi)

Holland Speedway is an automotive racing facility in Western New York which features a 0.375-mile (0.604 km) banked asphalt oval. The complex also includes a quarter mile “Figure 8” course and paintball park.

== Overview ==
Holland Speedway was established by boyhood friends Ronald Bennett, Richard Knox, and Gordon Becker in 1960 as a 1/3 mile dirt oval, with a seating capacity of about 1200 people. It then expanded to a 3/8 mile in 1964, and in 1968 was converted to asphalt and became NASCAR sanctioned. Over time, seating capacity was expanded to hold over 7000 fans and competitors.

In 2018, the venue was operated as “The Track at Hillside Buffalo” by Daniel Hutchinson, but the next year was brought back under the original ownership of the Bennett family and returned to its established name. Repairs and updates to the facility along with the COVID-19 pandemic pushed off the reopening until August of 2021.

== Events ==
The speedway hosts the Race of Champions series periodically during the racing season, which includes the Asphalt Modifieds and Sportsman, Late Models, Street Stocks and Super Stocks, 4 Cylinders, and TQ Midgets.

It also features an annual Crash-A-Rama. The event includes the boat and trailer race, the flagpole race, a demolition derby, the 4-cylinder Enduro race, Full-Size Figure 8 school bus race, Powder Puff race (women only), and the spectator race
