= Beech Ridge Motor Speedway =

Race track in Scarborough, Maine

- Location: Scarborough, Maine
- Coordinates: 43.610294°N 70.380747°W
- Owner: Andy Cusack
- Broke ground: 1948
- Opened: May 20, 1949
- Architect: James B. McConnell
- Major events: Pro series, sport series, wild cats, street devils, mad bombers, beetle bugs, mighty trucks, legends

Oval
- Surface: Asphalt
- Length: 1/3 mi (0.54 km)
- Turns: 4

Beech Ridge Motor Speedway is a defunct 1/3 mile NASCAR-sanctioned asphalt oval auto racing track in Scarborough, Maine. The track is located near the Scarborough Downs horse racing track.

Beech Ridge Motor Speedway hosted races on Saturday nights, as well as Thursdays. On Saturdays, the racing consisted of the Pro Series, Sport Series, and the Wild Cats. On Thursdays, the Mad Bombers, Beetle Bugs, Mighty Trucks, Ladies and Legends divisions participate. The Pro Series featured Super Late Model cars and for the 2018 season featured three former Oxford 250 winners. Maine's winningest stockcar driver Mike Rowe raced weekly at the track in the Pro Series.

The track was opened in 1949 by Jim McConnell, an airplane mechanic. In 1981, it was bought by the Cusack family. It became a NASCAR sanctioned track in 1995.

The facility hosted 18 NASCAR Busch North Series events between 1995 and 2003. The speedway also hosted 5 NASCAR Whelen Modified Tour races, one in 1995 and the other four from 2002 through 2005. The series returned to the track for the 2021 season.

Beech Ridge Motor Speedway also had 10 ACT Late Model races between 2009 and 2017.

On September 11, 2021, owner Andy Cusack announced that the track would be sold to developers. The last race at the speedway was held on September 26, 2021.
