= Rick Fuller (racing driver) =

American racing driver

- Born: October 19, 1960 (age 66); Auburn, Massachusetts, U.S.

NASCAR O'Reilly Auto Parts Series career
- 4 races run over 3 years
- Best finish: 82nd (1997)
- First race: 1997 Sears Auto Center 250 (Milwaukee)
- Last race: 1999 First Union 200 (Nazareth)
Wins	Top tens	Poles
0	0	0

ARCA Menards Series East career
- 21 races run over 4 years
- Best finish: 34th (1998)
- First race: 1996 Tri-State Megabucks Twin 125's (New Hampshire)
- Last race: 1999 NASCAR 150 (Stafford)
- First win: 1998 CarQuest Auto Parts 150 (Stafford)
Wins	Top tens	Poles
1	9	0
- Statistics up to date as of August 1, 2024.

Rick Fuller (born October 19, 1960) is an American former professional stock car racing driver who competed in the NASCAR Whelen Modified Tour, NASCAR Busch Series, and NASCAR Busch North Series. He is the younger brother of former NASCAR driver Jeff Fuller, and uncle of former driver Rob Fuller.

Fuller has also competed in the PASS North Super Late Model Series, the Race of Champions Asphalt Modified Tour, and the World Series of Asphalt Stock Car Racing.

== Motorsports results ==
=== NASCAR ===
(key) (Bold – Pole position awarded by qualifying time. Italics – Pole position earned by points standings or practice time. * – Most laps led.)

==== Busch Series ====
NASCAR Busch Series results
Year	Team	No.	Make	1	2	3	4	5	6	7	8	9	10	11	12	13	14	15	16	17	18	19	20	21	22	23	24	25	26	27	28	29	30	31	32	NBSC	Pts	Ref
1997	Taylor Motorsports	40	Ford	DAY	CAR	RCH	ATL	LVS	DAR	HCY	TEX	BRI	NSV	TAL	NHA	NZH	CLT	DOV	SBO	GLN	MLW; 22	MYB	GTY	IRP; 38	MCH	BRI	DAR	RCH	DOV	CLT	CAL	CAR				82nd	146	
1997	Taylor Motorsports	40	Chevy																														HOM; DNQ			82nd	146	
1998	Taylor Motorsports	40	Chevy	DAY; 27	CAR; DNQ																															105th	82	
1998	Taylor Motorsports	04	Chevy			LVS; DNQ	NSV	DAR	BRI	TEX	HCY	TAL	NHA	NZH	CLT	DOV	RCH	PPR	GLN	MLW	MYB	CAL	SBO	IRP	MCH	BRI	DAR	RCH	DOV	CLT	GTY	CAR	ATL	HOM		105th	82	
1999	Team Rensi Motorsports	25	Chevy	DAY	CAR	LVS	ATL	DAR	TEX	NSV	BRI	TAL	CAL	NHA	RCH	NZH; 26	CLT	DOV	SBO	GLN	MLW	MYB	PPR	GTY	IRP	MCH	BRI	DAR	RCH	DOV	CLT	CAR	MEM	PHO	HOM	113th	85	

==== Whelen Modified Tour ====
NASCAR Whelen Modified Tour results
Year	Team	No.	Make	1	2	3	4	5	6	7	8	9	10	11	12	13	14	15	16	17	18	19	20	21	22	23	24	25	26	27	28	29	NWMTC	Pts	Ref
1985	N/A	55	Chevy	TMP; 13	MAR	STA; 14	MAR; 21	NEG						STA; 16	TMP; 11	NEG	HOL	HOL	RIV	CAT	EPP	TMP; 19	WFD; 9	RIV	STA; 11	TMP; 5	POC; 31	TIO	OXF			MAR; 28	16th	1490	
1985	N/A	2X	Chevy						WFD; 7	NEG	SPE	RIV	CLA																				16th	1490	
1985	N/A	2	Chevy																											STA; 30	TMP; 29		16th	1490	
1986	N/A	55	Chevy	ROU; 24	MAR; 24	STA; 16	TMP; 21	MAR	NEG	MND	EPP; 2	NEG	WFD; 21	SPE	RIV	NEG	TMP	RIV	TMP; 5	RIV													19th	1197	
1986	N/A	U2	Chevy																		STA; 3	TMP				STA; 16	TMP	MAR					19th	1197	
1986	N/A	02	N/A																				POC; 50	TIO	OXF; 27								19th	1197	
1987	N/A	2	Olds	ROU; 8													EPP; 8																12th	2877	
1987	N/A	2	Chevy		MAR; 23														STA; 25	TMP; 11	RIV; 24	SEE; 11		POC; 50	TIO	TMP; 37	OXF; DNQ	TMP; 5	ROU	MAR			12th	2877	
1987	N/A	U2	Chevy			TMP; 7	STA; 11	CNB; 25	STA; 3	MND; 8*	WFD; 15		SPE; 3	RIV; 6	TMP; 21	RPS; 4		RIV; 24					STA; 19								STA; 14		12th	2877	
1987	N/A	30	Chevy									JEN; 23																					12th	2877	
1988	Rick Fuller	2	Chevy	ROU; 5	MAR; 7		MAR; 24	JEN; 9					RIV; 13	JEN; 8	RPS; 6		RIV; 15	OSW; 7	TMP; 6	OXF; 11		TMP; 5	POC; 48	TIO; 10									4th	3201	
1988	Rick Fuller	U2	Olds			TMP; 27			IRP; 2	MND; 3	OSW; 26	OSW; 9				TMP; 2					OSW; 17				TMP; 1	ROU; 1*							4th	3201	
1988	Rick Fuller	2	Chevy																								MAR; 14						4th	3201	
1989	Rick Fuller	U2	Ford	MAR; 4	TMP; 30	MAR; 6	JEN; 8	STA; 12	IRP; 29																								10th	3250	
1989	N/A	6	Chevy							OSW; 9																							10th	3250	
1989	N/A	55	Chevy								WFD; 9	MND; 8																					10th	3250	
1989	Curt Chase	77	Chevy										RIV; 23	OSW; 22	JEN; 24	STA; 7	RPS; 4	RIV; 5	OSW; 12	TMP; 11	TMP; 8												10th	3250	
1989	Curt Chase	77	Pontiac																			RPS; 16*	OSW; 29	TMP; 6	POC; 48	STA; 9	TIO; 3	MAR; 10	TMP; 3				10th	3250	
1990	Curt Chase	77	Pontiac	MAR; 6	**TMP**; 18*	RCH; 1	STA; 4	MAR; 27													NHA; 26					MAR; 22							3rd	3159	
1990	Curt Chase	77	Chevy						STA; 2	TMP; 13	MND; 4	HOL; 5	STA; 2	RIV; 18	JEN; 7	EPP; 5	RPS; 8	RIV; 6	TMP; 24	RPS; 3		TMP; 11	POC; 15	STA; 7	TMP; 3								3rd	3159	
1991	Mario Fiore	44	Pontiac	MAR; 4	RCH; 19	TMP; 1	NHA; 2	MAR; 2	NZH; 8	STA; 20	TMP; 18	FLE; 15	OXF; 25	RIV; 1	JEN; 19	**STA**; 24*	RPS; 19	RIV; 7	RCH; 24	TMP; 5	NHA; 5	TMP; 4	POC; 2	STA; 28	TMP; 21	MAR; 4							6th	3045	
1992	Mario Fiore	44	Pontiac	MAR; 3	TMP; 28	RCH; 19	STA; 1	MAR; 6	NHA; 31	NZH; 3	STA; 28	TMP; 5	FLE; 30	RIV; 3	NHA; 5	STA; 22	RPS; 2	RIV; 7	TMP; 26	TMP; 1*	NHA; 4	STA; 20	MAR; 28	TMP; 5									8th	2717	
1993	Curt Chase	77	Pontiac	RCH; 27	STA; 8	TMP; 5	NHA; 21	NZH; 4	STA; 5	RIV; 3	NHA; 3	RPS; 1**	HOL; 2	LEE; 2	RIV; 5	STA; 22	TMP; 6	TMP; 4	STA; 3	TMP; 6													1st	2521	
1994	Curt Chase	77	Pontiac	**NHA**; 2*	STA; 17	TMP; 6	NZH; 5*	STA; 1*	LEE; 26*	TMP; 1	RIV; 10	TIO; 7	NHA; 2	RPS; 20	HOL; 5	TMP; 24	RIV; 10	NHA; 5	STA; 27	SPE; 19	TMP; 11	NHA; 31	STA; 3	TMP; 25									6th	2761	
1995	Curt Chase	77	Pontiac	TMP; 3	NHA; 9	STA; 2	NZH; 38	STA; 5	LEE; 7	TMP; 4	RIV; 6	BEE; 28	NHA; 5	JEN; 6	RPS; 26	HOL; 9	**RIV**; 2	NHA; 4	STA; 2	TMP; 2	NHA; 7	**STA**; 20	TMP; 17	TMP; 4									3rd	2931	
1996	Bobby Fuller	17	Chevy	TMP; 6	STA; 2*	NZH; 3	STA; 6	NHA; 25	JEN; 24	RIV; 1	LEE; 1*	RPS; 4	HOL; 5	TMP; 3	RIV; 6	**NHA**; 3	GLN; 17	STA; 19	NHA; 36	NHA; 15	STA; 22	FLE; 3	TMP; 29										3rd	2698	
1997	Art Barry	21	Chevy	TMP; 1**	MAR; 3	STA; 18	NZH; 6	STA; 4	NHA; 12	FLE; 9	JEN; 12	RIV; 5	GLN; 2	NHA; 2	RPS; 10	HOL; 16	TMP; 1*	RIV; 7	NHA; 15	GLN; 2	STA; 8	NHA; 31	STA; 3*	FLE; 21	TMP; 7*	RCH; 5							3rd	3292	
1998	Scott & Patty Bandzul	8	Chevy	RPS	TMP	MAR	STA	NZH	STA	GLN	JEN	RIV	NHA; 31	NHA; 20	LEE	HOL	TMP; 27		RIV; 7	STA; 1*	NHA; 4	TMP; 14	STA; 12	TMP; 2	FLE								27th	1214	
1998	Scott & Patty Bandzul	84	Chevy															NHA; 36															27th	1214	
1999	Scott & Patty Bandzul	8	Chevy	TMP; 2	RPS; 22	STA; 1	RCH; 25	STA; 4	RIV; 4	JEN; 7	NHA; 3	NZH; 29	HOL; 6	TMP; 4	NHA; 11	RIV; 6	GLN; 31	STA; 2	RPS; 5	TMP; 26	NHA; 36	STA; 24	MAR; 3	TMP; 1									5th	2803	
2000	Scott & Patty Bandzul	8	Chevy	STA; 1	RCH; 18	STA; 7	RIV; 2*	SEE; 3	NHA; 11	NZH; 18	TMP; 5	RIV; 2	GLN; 14	TMP; 4	STA; 2	WFD; 10	NHA; 4	STA; 4	**MAR**; 4	TMP; 18													3rd	2508	
2001	Scott & Patty Bandzul	8	Chevy	SBO; 12	TMP; 1	STA; 20	WFD; 22	NZH; 25	STA; 17	RIV; 6	SEE; 10	RCH; 11	NHA; 10	HOL; 6	RIV; 14	CHE; 23	TMP; 4	STA; 24	WFD; 5	TMP; 23	STA; 2	MAR; 2	TMP; 8										7th	2602	
2002	Scott & Patty Bandzul	8	Chevy	TMP; 4	STA; 2	WFD; 6	NZH; 22	RIV; 17*	SEE; 11	RCH; 11	STA; 3	BEE; 5	NHA; 11	RIV; 13	TMP; 2	STA; 7	WFD; 7	TMP; 38	NHA; 7	STA; 9	MAR; 2*	TMP; 22											5th	2585	
2003	Tony Marciel/Guy Ronzoni	1	Chevy	TMP; 15	STA; 20	WFD; 1*	NZH; 25	STA; 25	LER; 5	BLL; 7	BEE; 4	NHA; 32	ADI; 7	RIV; 13	TMP; 28	STA; 3	WFD; 4	TMP; 4		STA; 8	TMP; 4												7th	2344	
2003	Tony Marciel/Guy Ronzoni	1	Pontiac																NHA; 20														7th	2344	
2004	Tony Marciel/Guy Ronzoni	1	Pontiac	TMP; 12	STA; 7	WFD; 11	NZH; 17	STA; 23	RIV; 8	LER; 4	WAL; 14	BEE; 5	NHA; 8	SEE; 6	RIV; 14	STA; 20	TMP; 5	WFD; 26	TMP; 5	NHA; 14	STA; 16	TMP; 9											5th	2472	
2005	Tony Marciel/Guy Ronzoni	1	Pontiac	TMP; 5	STA; 18	RIV; 7	WFD; 14	STA; 5	JEN; 6	NHA; 6	BEE; 27	SEE; 9	RIV; 13	STA; 29	TMP; 2	WFD; 19		TMP; 13	NHA; 26	STA; 17	TMP; 19												8th	2236	
2005	Tony Marciel/Guy Ronzoni	01	Pontiac														MAR; 12																8th	2236	
2006	Joe Brady	00	Chevy	TMP; 27	STA; 18	JEN	TMP	STA	NHA; 31	HOL	RIV	STA	TMP	MAR	TMP; 10	NHA; 31	WFD	TMP	STA; 31														39th	535	
2007	William Calicchio	13	Chevy	TMP; 25	STA; 29	WTO	STA; 30	TMP; 23	NHA; 37	TSA	RIV	STA	TMP	MAN	MAR																		31st	846	
2007	Curt Chase	77	Toyota													NHA; 12	TMP; 20																31st	846	
2007	Curt Chase	77	Pontiac															STA; 8	TMP; 24														31st	846	
2008	Curt Chase	77	Toyota	TMP; 32	STA; 34	STA; 30	TMP; 12	NHA; 14	SPE	RIV	STA; 11	TMP; 23	MAN; 19	TMP; 5	NHA; 36	MAR; 25	CHE	STA; 14	TMP; 30														25th	1271	

Sporting positions
Preceded by Jeff Fuller	NASCAR Winston Modified Tour Champion; 1993	Succeeded by Wayne Anderson
