= Martin Truex Sr. =

American racing driver (1958–2025)

Martin Truex
- Born: March 24, 1958; Stafford Township, New Jersey, U.S.
- Died: January 17, 2025 (aged 66); Huntersville, North Carolina, U.S.

NASCAR O'Reilly Auto Parts Series career
- 15 races run over 7 years
- Best finish: 84th (1992)
- First race: 1989 Miller Classic (Martinsville)
- Last race: 1998 First Union 200 (Nazareth)
Wins	Top tens	Poles
0	0	0

ARCA Menards Series East career
- 135 races run over 10 years
- Best finish: 7th (1994)
- First race: 1992 New Hampshire Lottery 125 (New Hampshire)
- Last race: 2000 Busch 125 (New Hampshire)
- First win: 1994 AutoPalace/Slick 50 150 (New Hampshire)
Wins	Top tens	Poles
1	42	7

Martin Truex Sr. (March 24, 1958 – January 17, 2025) was an American driver in the Busch North Series. He was the father of 2017 NASCAR Cup Series champion Martin Truex Jr. and NASCAR Xfinity Series driver Ryan Truex. Truex Sr. retired to advance Martin's career. He was one of the owners of the commercial fishing company Sea Watch International.

Truex made 15 starts in the Busch Series from 1989 to 1998. His best finish came in 1994, when he finished 12th at Nazareth Speedway.

Truex died in Huntersville, North Carolina, on January 17, 2025, at the age of 66.

== Motorsports career results ==
=== NASCAR ===
(key) (Bold – Pole position awarded by qualifying time. Italics – Pole position earned by points standings or practice time. * – Most laps led.)

==== Busch Series ====
NASCAR Busch Series results
Year	Team	No.	Make	1	2	3	4	5	6	7	8	9	10	11	12	13	14	15	16	17	18	19	20	21	22	23	24	25	26	27	28	29	30	31	NBSC	Pts	Ref
1989	Truex Motorsports	58	Pontiac	DAY	CAR	MAR; 25	HCY	DAR	BRI	NZH; 30	SBO	LAN	NSV	CLT	DOV	ROU	LVL	VOL	MYB	SBO	HCY	DUB	IRP	ROU	BRI	DAR	RCH	DOV	MAR; 22	CLT	CAR	MAR			89th	73	
1990	Truex Motorsports	58	Pontiac	DAY	RCH	CAR	MAR; 20	HCY	DAR	BRI	LAN	SBO	NZH	HCY	CLT	DOV	ROU	VOL	MYB	OXF	NHA	SBO	DUB	IRP	ROU	BRI	DAR	RCH	DOV	MAR	CLT	NHA	CAR	MAR	87th	103	
1992	Ling Racing	68	Pontiac	DAY	CAR	RCH	ATL	MAR	DAR	BRI	HCY	LAN	DUB	NZH; 18	CLT	DOV	ROU	MYB	GLN	VOL	NHA; 34	TAL	IRP	ROU	MCH	NHA	BRI	DAR	RCH	DOV	CLT	MAR	CAR	HCY	84th	170	
1993	Truex Motorsports	56	Chevy	DAY	CAR	RCH	DAR	BRI	HCY	ROU	MAR	NZH; 21	CLT	DOV	MYB	GLN	MLW	TAL	IRP	MCH	NHA; 13	BRI	DAR	RCH	DOV	ROU	CLT	MAR	CAR	HCY	ATL				NC^{1}	0	
1994	Truex Motorsports	56	Chevy	DAY	CAR	RCH	ATL	MAR	DAR	HCY	BRI	ROU	NHA; 30		CLT	DOV	MYB	GLN; 38	MLW	SBO	TAL	HCY	IRP	MCH	BRI	DAR	RCH	DOV	CLT	MAR	CAR				NC^{1}	0	
1994	Truex Motorsports	58	Chevy											NZH; 12																					NC^{1}	0	
1995	Truex Motorsports	56	Chevy	DAY	CAR	RCH	ATL	NSV	DAR	BRI	HCY	NHA; 39	NZH; 20	CLT	DOV	MYB	GLN; 29	MLW	TAL	SBO	IRP	MCH	BRI	DAR	RCH	DOV	CLT	CAR	HOM						NC^{1}	0	
1996	Truex Motorsports	56	Chevy	DAY	CAR	RCH	ATL	NSV	DAR	BRI	HCY	NZH; DNQ	CLT	DOV	SBO	MYB	GLN	MLW	NHA	TAL	IRP	MCH	BRI	DAR	RCH	DOV	CLT	CAR	HOM						NC^{1}	0	
1997	Truex Motorsports	59	Chevy	DAY	CAR	RCH	ATL	LVS	DAR	HCY	TEX	BRI	NSV	TAL	NHA	NZH	CLT	DOV	SBO	GLN	MLW	MYB	GTY	IRP	MCH	BRI	DAR	RCH	DOV	CLT	CAL	CAR; DNQ	HOM		N/A	0	
1998	Ling Racing	0	Chevy	DAY	CAR	LVS	NSV	DAR	BRI	TEX	HCY	TAL	NHA	NZH; 40	CLT	DOV	RCH	PPR	GLN	MLW	MYB	CAL	SBO	IRP	MCH	BRI	DAR	RCH	DOV	CLT	GTY	CAR	ATL	HOM	NC^{1}	0	

==== Craftsman Truck Series ====
NASCAR Craftsman Truck Series results
Year	Team	No.	Make	1	2	3	4	5	6	7	8	9	10	11	12	13	14	15	16	17	18	19	20	21	22	23	24	25	NCTC	Pts	Ref
1999	Ling Racing	68	Chevy	HOM	PHO	EVG	MMR	MAR	MEM	PPR	I70	BRI	TEX	PIR	GLN	MLW	NSV	NZH	MCH	NHA	IRP	GTY	HPT	RCH	LVS	LVL; DNQ	TEX	CAL	N/A	0	

==== Busch North Series ====
NASCAR Busch North Series results
Year	Team	No.	Make	1	2	3	4	5	6	7	8	9	10	11	12	13	14	15	16	17	18	19	20	21	22	NBNSC	Pts	Ref
1992	Ling Racing	68	Pontiac	DAY	CAR	RCH	NHA; 13	NZH; 18	MND; 15			LEE; 19	JEN; 14		NHA; 34	OXF; 23	HOL; DNQ	EPP; 21	NHA	RPS; 27		NHA; 38				16th	1357	
1992	Ling Racing	88	Pontiac							OXF; 15	DOV												EPP; 12			16th	1357	
1992	Ling Racing	68	Olds											OXF; 26							OXF; 26					16th	1357	
1993	Truex Motorsports	56	Olds	LEE; 26	NHA; 16	MND; 9		HOL; 19	GLN; 31	JEN; 7	STA; 14	GLN	NHA; 10	WIS; 14	NHA; 20		RPS; 17	TMP; 19	WMM; 14	LEE; 22	EPP; 20	LRP; 13				13th	1871	
1993	Truex Motorsports	56	Chevy				NZH; 21									NHA; 13										13th	1871	
1994	Truex Motorsports	56	Olds	NHA; 15		MND; 16		SPE; 9	HOL; 20	GLN; 10	JEN; 5	EPP; 24		NHA; 1*	WIS; 9	STA; 6	TMP; 24	MND; 5	WMM; 8	RPS; 5	LEE; 15					7th	2296	
1994	Truex Motorsports	56	Chevy		NHA; 30								GLN; 38									**NHA**; 12	LRP; 6			7th	2296	
1994	Truex Motorsports	58	Chevy				NZH; 12																			7th	2296	
1995	Truex Motorsports	56	Chevy	DAY	NHA; 8	LEE; 24	JEN; 9	NHA; 39	NZH; 20	HOL; 15	BEE; 10	TMP; 30	GLN; 29	NHA; 7	TIO; 8	MND; 21	GLN; 13	EPP; 18	**RPS**; 9	LEE; 19	STA; 12	BEE; 30	NHA; 9	**TMP**; 8*	LRP; 12	12th	2201	
1996	Truex Motorsports	56	Chevy	DAY	LEE; 28	JEN; 24	NZH	HOL; 16	NHA; 38	TIO; 26	BEE	TMP; 20	NZH; 21	NHA; 16	STA; 10	GLN; 35	EPP	RPS	LEE	NHA; 34	NHA; 43	BEE	TMP; 11	LRP; 30		27th	1261	
1997	Truex Motorsports	56	Chevy	DAY	LEE; 21	JEN; 13	NHA; 30	NZH	HOL; 6	NHA; 44	STA; 28	BEE	TMP; 2	NZH; 20	TIO	NHA; 8	STA; 7	THU	GLN; 3	EPP	RPS; 15	BEE	**TMP**; 28	NHA; 24	LRP; 26	20th	1656	
1998	Ling Racing	6	Chevy	**LEE**; 3	RPS; 7	NHA; 20		HOL; 5	GLN	STA; 17	NHA; 28	DOV; 27	**STA**; 7	NHA; 42	GLN; 6	EPP; 20	JEN; 7	NHA; 27	THU; 13	TMP; 7	BEE; 21	LRP; 19				10th	1988	
1998	Ling Racing	0	Chevy				NZH; 40																			10th	1988	
1999	Ling Racing	6	Chevy	LEE; 14	RPS; 9	NHA; 26	TMP; 12	NZH	HOL; 6	BEE	**JEN**; 2	GLN	STA; 7	NHA; 19	NZH; 32	STA; 30	NHA; 9	GLN; 10	EPP	THU	BEE	NHA; 13	LRP; 10			20th	1713	
2000	Ling Racing	6	Chevy	LEE	NHA; 5	SEE	HOL	BEE	JEN	GLN	STA	NHA	NZH	STA	WFD	GLN	EPP	TMP	THU	BEE	NHA	LRP				70th	155	

==== Winston Modified Tour ====
NASCAR Winston Modified Tour results
Year	Team	No.	Make	1	2	3	4	5	6	7	8	9	10	11	12	13	14	15	16	17	18	19	20	21	22	23	24	25	26	27	28	29	NWMTC	Pts	Ref
1985	Truex Motorsports	58	Chevy	TMP	MAR	STA	MAR	NEG	WFD	NEG	SPE	RIV	CLA	STA	TMP	NEG	HOL	HOL	RIV	CAT	EPP	TMP	WFD	RIV	STA	TMP	POC; 32	TIO	OXF	STA	TMP	MAR	159th	-	
1986	Truex Motorsports	59	Chevy	ROU	MAR	STA	TMP	MAR	NEG	MND	EPP	NEG	WFD	SPE	RIV	NEG	TMP	RIV	TMP	RIV	STA	TMP	POC; 27	TIO	OXF	STA	TMP	MAR					146th	-	
1987	Truex Motorsports	59	Chevy	ROU	MAR; 14	TMP	STA	CNB	STA	MND	WFD	JEN	SPE	RIV	TMP	RPS	EPP	RIV	STA	TMP	RIV	SEE	STA										82nd	-	
1987	Truex Motorsports	58	Chevy																					POC; 37	TIO	TMP	OXF	TMP	ROU	MAR	STA		82nd	-	
1988	Truex Motorsports	56	Chevy	ROU	MAR; 14	TMP	MAR; 27	JEN	IRP	MND	OSW	OSW	RIV	JEN	RPS	TMP	RIV	OSW	TMP	OXF	OSW	TMP	POC; 34	TIO	TMP	ROU	MAR						65th	-	

^{1} Competed only in companion events with Busch North Series as BNS driver and ineligible for Busch Series points
