= Tony Jankowiak =

American racing driver

- Nationality: (United States) American
- Born: April 28, 1960 Tonawanda, New York, U.S.
- Died: April 22, 1990 (aged 29) Stafford Springs, Connecticut, U.S.
- Relatives: Andy Jankowiak

NASCAR Winston Modified Tour
- Years active: 1985–1990
- Starts: 35
- Wins: 0
- Poles: 0
- Best finish: 24th in 1986, 1989

Tony Jankowiak (born April 28, 1960 – April 22, 1990) was an American professional stock car racing driver who competed in the NASCAR Winston Modified Tour from 1985 to 1990. His wife Debbie is the sister of Tommy Druar, who competed in the tour until his death in 1989, and their son Andy Jankowiak, who currently competes part time in the now NASCAR Whelen Modified Tour and the ARCA Menards Series, best known for driving No. 73 (which Andy used in ARCA up until 2026).

Jankowiak died as a result of injuries suffered in crash during a Modified Tour race at Stafford Motor Speedway on April 22, 1990, six days before his 30th birthday.

Jankowiak also competed in series such as the SMART Modified Tour and the World Series of Asphalt Stock Car Racing.

== Motorsports results ==
=== NASCAR ===
(key) (Bold – Pole position awarded by qualifying time. Italics – Pole position earned by points standings or practice time. * – Most laps led.)

==== Winston Modified Tour ====
NASCAR Winston Modified Tour results
Year	Team	No.	Make	1	2	3	4	5	6	7	8	9	10	11	12	13	14	15	16	17	18	19	20	21	22	23	24	25	26	27	28	29	NWMTC	Pts	Ref
1985	Tony Jankowiak	73	Chevy	TMP	MAR	STA	MAR	NEG	WFD	NEG	SPE; 19	RIV	CLA	STA	TMP	NEG	HOL; 7	HOL; 2*	RIV	CAT	EPP	TMP	WFD	RIV	STA	TMP; 46	POC; 7	TIO; 4	OXF	STA	TMP	MAR	31st	595	
1986	Tony Jankowiak	73	Chevy	ROU	MAR	STA	TMP; 23	MAR	NEG	MND	EPP	NEG	WFD	SPE; 13	RIV	NEG	TMP	RIV	TMP; 24	RIV	STA; 15	TMP	POC; 35	TIO; 16	OXF; 28	STA	TMP; 6	MAR					24th	829	
1987	Tony Jankowiak	73	Chevy	ROU	MAR	TMP	STA	CNB; 16	STA	MND	WFD	JEN; 14	SPE	RIV	TMP; 20	RPS	EPP	RIV	STA	TMP	RIV	SEE	STA	POC; 27	TIO	TMP	OXF	TMP	ROU	MAR	STA		46th	318	
1988	Tony Jankowiak	73	Chevy	ROU	MAR	TMP	MAR	JEN	IRP; 18	MND	OSW; 13	OSW	RIV	JEN	RPS	TMP	RIV	OSW	TMP	OXF	OSW; 21	TMP	POC; 20	TIO									32nd	661	
1988	N/A	93	N/A																						TMP; 23	ROU	MAR						32nd	661	
1989	Tony Jankowiak	73	Pontiac	MAR	TMP	MAR	JEN	STA	IRP; 3	OSW; 3	WFD	MND	RIV	OSW					OSW; 7	TMP	TMP; 10	RPS	OSW; 12	TMP	POC; 31	STA	TIO; 12						24th	1057	
1989	Tony Jankowiak	73	Chevy												JEN; 19	STA	RPS	RIV															24th	1057	
1989	Bill Potts	99	Pontiac																									MAR; 21	TMP				24th	1057	
1990	Bill Potts	99	Chevy	MAR; 32	TMP	RCH; 31	STA; 19	MAR	STA	TMP	MND	HOL	STA	RIV	JEN	EPP	RPS	RIV	TMP	RPS	NHA	TMP	POC	STA	TMP	MAR							N/A	0	
