= Richard Houlihan =

American racing driver (born 1956)

- Nationality: American
- Born: September 5, 1956 (age 70) Bridgewater, Massachusetts, U.S.

NASCAR Whelen Modified Tour career
- Debut season: 1986
- Years active: 1986–1987, 2002–2007
- Starts: 61
- Championships: 0
- Wins: 0
- Poles: 0
- Best finish: 13th in 2006
- Statistics up to date as of September 16, 2024.

Richard "Dick" Houlihan (born September 5, 1956) is an American former professional stock car racing driver who competed in the NASCAR Whelen Modified Tour from 1986 to 1987, and again from 2002 to 2007. Houlihan was a successful Pro- 4 Modified and Pro Stock competitor in New England before his transition to modifieds.

Houlihan has also previously competed in series such as the Modified Racing Series and the Tri-Track Open Modified Series.

== Motorsports results ==
=== NASCAR ===
(key) (Bold – Pole position awarded by qualifying time. Italics – Pole position earned by points standings or practice time. * – Most laps led.)

==== Whelen Modified Tour ====
NASCAR Whelen Modified Tour results
Year	Team	No.	Make	1	2	3	4	5	6	7	8	9	10	11	12	13	14	15	16	17	18	19	20	21	22	23	24	25	26	27	28	NWMTC	Pts	Ref
1986	N/A	N/A	N/A	ROU	MAR	STA	TMP	MAR	NEG	MND	EPP; 11	NEG	WFD	SPE	RIV	NEG	TMP	RIV	TMP	RIV	STA	TMP	POC	TIO	OXF	STA	TMP	MAR				N/A	0	
1987	N/A	N/A	N/A	ROU	MAR	TMP	STA	CNB	STA	MND	WFD	JEN	SPE	RIV	TMP	RPS	EPP	RIV	STA	TMP	RIV	SEE	STA	POC	TIO	TMP	OXF; 19	TMP	ROU	MAR	STA	N/A	0	
2002	N/A	03	N/A	TMP	STA	WFD	NZH	RIV	SEE	RCH	STA	BEE	NHA	RIV	TMP	STA	WFD	TMP	NHA	STA	MAR	TMP; DNQ										N/A	0	
2003	N/A	34	Dodge	TMP; 23	STA; 28	WFD	NZH	STA; DNQ	LER	BLL; 9	BEE																					37th	737	
2003	N/A	34	Chevy									NHA; 28	ADI	RIV	TMP; 23	STA; DNQ	WFD	TMP; 14	NHA	STA	TMP; DNQ											37th	737	
2004	N/A	34	Chevy	TMP; DNQ																												31st	1063	
2004	N/A	46	Chevy		STA; DNQ	WFD; DNQ		STA; 8	RIV	LER	WAL	BEE; DNQ	NHA; DNQ	SEE; 3	RIV	STA; 12	TMP; DNQ	WFD; 15	TMP; 35	NHA	STA; DNQ	TMP; 18										31st	1063	
2004	N/A	00	N/A				NZH; DNQ																									31st	1063	
2005	Robert Katon	46	Chevy	TMP; 28	STA; 25	RIV; 23	WFD; DNQ	STA; 19	JEN	NHA; 23	BEE; 15	SEE; 14	RIV; 16	STA; 20	TMP; 31	WFD; 11	MAR	TMP; 34	NHA; 29	STA; 23	TMP; 20											20th	1519	
2006	Robert Katon	46	Chevy	TMP; 9	STA; 17	JEN; 13	TMP; 16	STA; 14	NHA; 19	HOL; 8	RIV; 16	STA; 13	TMP; 28	MAR; 17	TMP; 17	NHA; 16	WFD; 19	TMP; 12	STA; 26													13th	1833	
2007	Robert Katon	46	Chevy	TMP; 18	STA; 14	WTO; 25	STA; 8	TMP; 18	NHA; 22	TSA; 25	RIV; 27	STA; 11	TMP; 23	MAN; 15	MAR; 4	NHA; 37	TMP; 13	STA; 18	TMP; 11													14th	1753	
