= Charlie Pasteryak =

American racing driver

- Nationality: American
- Born: Charles Pasteryak III; August 8, 1955 (age 71) Lisbon, Connecticut, U.S.

NASCAR Whelen Modified Tour career
- Debut season: 1985
- Years active: 1985, 1987–2005, 2007–2008
- Starts: 311
- Championships: 0
- Wins: 3
- Poles: 1
- Best finish: 5th in 1994, 2001
- Statistics up to date as of October 9, 2024.

Charles Pasteryak III (born August 8, 1955) is an American professional stock car racing driver who competed in the NASCAR Whelen Modified Tour from 1985 to 2008. He is the younger brother of the late Carl Pasteryak, and the father of Chris Pasteryak, who both competed in the series.

Pasteryak has also competed in series such as the SMART Modified Tour, the Tri-Track Open Modified Series, the Modified Racing Series, the EXIT Realty Modified Touring Series, the ASA Southern Modified Race Tour, and the World Series of Asphalt Stock Car Racing.

== Motorsports results ==
=== NASCAR ===
(key) (Bold – Pole position awarded by qualifying time. Italics – Pole position earned by points standings or practice time. * – Most laps led.)

==== Whelen Modified Tour ====
NASCAR Whelen Modified Tour results
Year	Car owner	No.	Make	1	2	3	4	5	6	7	8	9	10	11	12	13	14	15	16	17	18	19	20	21	22	23	24	25	26	27	28	29	NWMTC	Pts	Ref
1985	N/A	75SK	N/A	TMP	MAR	STA	MAR	NEG	WFD	NEG	SPE	RIV	CLA	STA	TMP	NEG	HOL	HOL	RIV	CAT	EPP	TMP	WFD; 16	RIV	STA	TMP	POC	TIO	OXF	STA	TMP	MAR	N/A	0	
1987	N/A	05	N/A	ROU	MAR	TMP	STA; 21	CNB																									23rd	1088	
1987	N/A	5	Pontiac						STA; 12	MND; 6	WFD; 20	JEN	SPE	RIV	TMP	RPS	EPP	RIV	STA	TMP; 7	RIV	SEE; 20	STA; 29							MAR; 15			23rd	1088	
1987	N/A	6	N/A																					POC; 9	TIO	TMP; 30	OXF	TMP					23rd	1088	
1987	N/A	75X	N/A																										ROU; 9				23rd	1088	
1987	N/A	5X	N/A																												STA; 17		23rd	1088	
1988	Charlie Pasteryak	5	Chevy	ROU; 12	MAR; 29	TMP	MAR	JEN	IRP	MND	OSW	OSW	RIV; DNQ	JEN	RPS; 11	TMP	RIV	OSW	TMP	OXF	OSW	TMP	POC	TIO	TMP; 28	ROU	MAR						42nd	416	
1989	Charlie Pasteryak	5	Chevy	MAR	TMP; 10	MAR; 18	JEN	STA; 30	IRP	OSW	WFD; 12	MND; 14	RIV	OSW	JEN; 15	STA; 11	RPS; 15	RIV	OSW; 19	TMP; 12	TMP; 13	RPS; 7	OSW; 24	TMP; 35	POC; 28	STA; 20	TIO; 22	MAR	TMP; 15				18th	2168	
1990	Charlie Pasteryak	5	Chevy	MAR; 10	TMP; 24	RCH	STA; 20	MAR	STA; 26	TMP	MND; 9	HOL	STA	RIV	JEN	EPP	RPS; 12	RIV	TMP; 27	RPS; DNQ	NHA	TMP; 14	POC; 40	STA	TMP	MAR							25th	924	
1991	Charlie Pasteryak	5	Chevy	MAR; 16	RCH; 12	TMP; 13	NHA; 17	MAR	NZH	STA	TMP	FLE	OXF	RIV	JEN	STA; 5	RPS; 17	RIV	RCH; 18	TMP; 15	NHA; 35	TMP; 21	POC	STA; 5	TMP; 28	MAR; 23							23rd	1458	
1992	Charlie Pasteryak	5	Chevy	MAR	TMP; 9	RCH; 24	STA; 20	MAR	NHA; 13	NZH; 9	STA; 18	TMP; 15	FLE; 21	RIV	NHA; 23	STA; 18	RPS; 26	RIV; 26	TMP	TMP; 7	NHA; 13	STA; 14	MAR; 18	TMP; 7									21st	2007	
1993	Charlie Pasteryak	5	Chevy	RCH; 9	STA; 25	TMP; 6	NHA; 8	NZH; 16	STA; 20	RIV; 19	NHA; 25	RPS; 16	HOL; 19	LEE; 5	RIV; 15	STA; 9	TMP; 7	TMP; 3	STA; 13	TMP; 12													10th	2121	
1994	Charlie Pasteryak	5	Chevy	NHA; 6	STA; 11	TMP; 1	NZH; 6	STA; 8	LEE; 3	TMP; 9	RIV; 6	TIO; 19	NHA; 3	RPS; 8	HOL; 13	TMP; 3	RIV; 11	NHA; 10	STA; 25	SPE; 3	TMP; 34	NHA; 30	STA; 5	TMP; 13									5th	2837	
1995	Charlie Pasteryak	5	Chevy	TMP; 4	**NHA**; 8	STA; 22	NZH; 17	STA; 2	LEE; 13	TMP; 8	RIV; 12	BEE; 15		JEN; 15	RPS; 7	HOL; 13	RIV; 10	NHA; 3	STA; 13	TMP; 5		STA; 7	TMP; 21	TMP; 6									7th	2803	
1995	Charlie Pasteryak	5	Pontiac										NHA; 16								NHA; 10												7th	2803	
1996	Charlie Pasteryak	5	Chevy	TMP; 17	STA; 6	NZH; 10	STA; 26	NHA; 16	JEN; 27	RIV; 17	LEE; 26	RPS; 18	HOL; 10	TMP; 12	RIV; 4	NHA; 25	GLN; 16	STA; 2	NHA; 4	NHA; 23	STA; 21	FLE; 4	TMP; 24										11th	2383	
1997	Charlie Pasteryak	5	Chevy	**TMP**; 18	MAR; 26	STA; 6	NZH; 2	STA; 5	NHA; 15	FLE; 17	JEN; 18*	RIV; 21	GLN; 8	NHA; 10	RPS; 15	HOL; 3	TMP; 18	RIV; 12	NHA; 8	GLN; 11	STA; 6	NHA; 5	STA; 6	FLE; 10	TMP; 8	RCH; 28							8th	2985	
1998	Charlie Pasteryak	5	Chevy	RPS; 12	TMP; 19	MAR; 20	**STA**; 5	NZH; 17	STA; 11	GLN; 11	JEN; 6	RIV; 5	NHA; 9	NHA; 9	LEE; 21	HOL; 6*	TMP; 17	NHA; 4	RIV; 17	STA; 4	NHA; 5	TMP; 15	STA; 25	TMP; 22	FLE								10th	2733	
1999	Charlie Pasteryak	5	Chevy	TMP; 6	RPS; 14	STA; 13	RCH; 7	STA; 5	RIV; 11	JEN; 4	NHA; 25	NZH; 4	HOL; 3	TMP; 2	NHA; 35	RIV; 7	GLN; 10	STA; 3	RPS; 27	TMP; 24	NHA; 7	STA; 7	MAR; 4	TMP; 29									8th	2773	
2000	Charlie Pasteryak	5	Chevy	STA; 10	RCH; 10	STA; 8	RIV; 15	SEE; 10	NHA; 7	NZH; 31	TMP; 19	RIV; 26	GLN; 3	TMP; 7	STA; 7	WFD; 18	NHA; 9	STA; 14	MAR; 11	TMP; 6													8th	2174	
2001	Charlie Pasteryak	5	Chevy	SBO; 6	TMP; 3	STA; 8	WFD; 12	NZH; 4	STA; 5	RIV; 18	SEE; 2	RCH; 27	NHA; 42	HOL; 3	RIV; 15	CHE; 8	TMP; 8	STA; 4	WFD; 13	TMP; 9	STA; 29	MAR; 20	TMP; 4										5th	2625	
2002	Charlie Pasteryak	5	Ford	TMP; 22	STA; 22	WFD; 12	NZH; 10	RIV; 13	SEE; 22	RCH; 10	STA; 19	BEE; 10	NHA; 31	RIV; DNQ	TMP; 27	STA; 10	WFD; 6	TMP; 11	NHA; 12	STA; 23	MAR; 7	TMP; 4											15th	2174	
2003	Charlie Pasteryak	5	Ford	TMP; 3	STA; 33	WFD; 27	NZH	STA; 12	LER	BLL	BEE	NHA; 9	ADI	RIV	TMP; 18	STA; 15	WFD	TMP; 13		STA; 12	TMP; 3												26th	1404	
2003	Charlie Pasteryak	5	Chevy																NHA; 16														26th	1404	
2004	Charlie Pasteryak	5	Chevy	TMP; 8	STA; 29	WFD; DNQ	NZH; 13	STA; 16	RIV	LER	WAL	BEE	NHA; 10	SEE	RIV	STA; 17	TMP; 11	WFD	TMP; 16	NHA; 38	STA; 12	TMP; 25											28th	1258	
2005	Charlie Pasteryak	5	Chevy	TMP; 37	STA; 8	RIV	WFD	STA; 6	JEN	NHA; 15	BEE	SEE	RIV	STA	TMP	WFD	MAR	TMP; 29	NHA; 11	STA; 6	TMP; 5												31st	973	
2007	Margrette Pasteryak	5	Chevy	TMP	STA	WTO	STA	TMP	NHA; 9	TSA	RIV	STA; 21	TMP	MAN	MAR	NHA; 13	TMP	STA; 25	TMP; DNQ														39th	560	
2008	Margrette Pasteryak	5	Chevy	TMP; 13	STA	STA; 12	TMP; 20	NHA	SPE	RIV	STA; 10	TMP	MAN	TMP	NHA; 37	MAR	CHE	STA	TMP; 28														36th	619	
