= Carl Pasteryak =

American racing driver

- Nationality: American
- Born: Carl S. Pasteryak; October 2, 1950 Lisbon, Connecticut, U.S.
- Died: December 10, 2021 (aged 71)

NASCAR Whelen Modified Tour career
- Debut season: 1985
- Years active: 1985–2009
- Starts: 354
- Championships: 0
- Wins: 0
- Poles: 3
- Best finish: 7th in 1994
- Statistics up to date as of October 10, 2024.

Carl S. Pasteryak (born October 2, 1950 – December 10, 2021) was an American professional stock car racing driver who competed in the NASCAR Whelen Modified Tour from 1985 to 2009. He is the older brother of Charlie Pasteryak, and the uncle of Chris Pasteryak, who both competed in the series.

Pasteryak died on December 10, 2021, following a brief illness.

Pasteryak also competed in series such as the Modified Racing Series, the Race of Champions Asphalt Modified Tour, and the World Series of Asphalt Stock Car Racing.

== Motorsports results ==
=== NASCAR ===
(key) (Bold – Pole position awarded by qualifying time. Italics – Pole position earned by points standings or practice time. * – Most laps led.)

==== Whelen Modified Tour ====
NASCAR Whelen Modified Tour results
Year	Car owner	No.	Make	1	2	3	4	5	6	7	8	9	10	11	12	13	14	15	16	17	18	19	20	21	22	23	24	25	26	27	28	29	NWMTC	Pts	Ref
1985	N/A	75	Chevy	TMP; 24	MAR	STA; 19	MAR	NEG	WFD	NEG	SPE	RIV	CLA	STA; 19	TMP; 16	NEG	HOL	HOL	RIV	CAT	EPP	TMP	WFD	RIV	STA	TMP; 12	POC; 8	TIO	OXF	STA; 15	TMP; 8	MAR; 14	20th	1068	
1986	N/A	75	Pontiac	ROU; 3	MAR; 13	STA; 25	TMP; 30	MAR; 22	NEG	MND	EPP	NEG	**WFD**; 10	SPE	RIV	NEG	TMP	RIV	TMP	RIV	STA; 14	TMP; 6	POC; 9	TIO	OXF	STA; 28	TMP	MAR; 6					18th	1240	
1987	N/A	75	Pontiac	ROU; 4	MAR; 12	TMP; 30	STA; 26	CNB; 9	STA; 10	MND; 9	WFD; 7	JEN; 13	SPE; 7	RIV; 18	TMP; 26	RPS; 17	EPP; 9	RIV; 10	STA; 10	TMP; 27	RIV; 16	SEE; 21	STA; 20	POC; 19	TIO; 22	TMP; 25	OXF; 30	TMP; 8	ROU; 19	MAR; 13	STA; 21		10th	3219	
1988	N/A	75	Chevy	ROU; 10	MAR; 10																												9th	2703	
1988	N/A	75	Pontiac			TMP; 20	MAR; 13	JEN; 6	IRP; 15	MND; 9	OSW; 22	OSW; 5	RIV; 18	JEN; 12	RPS; 12	TMP; 25	RIV; 13	OSW	TMP; 12	OXF; 8	OSW		POC; 3	TIO; 12	TMP; 30	ROU; 20	MAR; 30						9th	2703	
1988	N/A	41	N/A																			TMP; 41											9th	2703	
1989	Carl Pasteryak	75	Pontiac	MAR; 21	TMP; 28	MAR	JEN; 13	STA; 24	IRP; 18	OSW; 17	WFD; 7	MND; 10	RIV	OSW; 6	JEN	STA	RPS	RIV	OSW	TMP	TMP	RPS	OSW	TMP	POC	STA; 8	TIO; 17	MAR; 12	TMP				21st	1566	
1990	Carl Pasteryak	75	Pontiac	MAR; 25	TMP; 15	RCH; DNQ	STA; 13	MAR; 26	STA; 14		MND; 20	HOL; 21	STA	RIV	JEN	EPP; 8	RPS; 17	RIV; DNQ	TMP; 12	RPS; 14	NHA; 29	TMP; 37	POC; 36	STA; 18	TMP	MAR; 10							22nd	1947	
1990	Carl Pasteryak	75	Chevy							TMP; 26																							22nd	1947	
1991	Carl Pasteryak	75	Pontiac	MAR; 2	RCH; 10	TMP; 23	NHA; 10	MAR; 28	NZH; 17	STA; 21	TMP; 30	FLE; 10	**OXF**; 23	RIV; 21	JEN	STA; 11	RPS; 14	RIV	RCH; 19	TMP; 31	NHA; 18	TMP; 20	POC; 18	STA; 15	TMP; 32	MAR							17th	2221	
1992	Carl Pasteryak	75	Pontiac	MAR; 11	TMP; 10	RCH; 9	STA; 8	MAR; 15	NHA; 20	NZH; 13	STA; 9	TMP; DNQ	FLE; 20	RIV; 16	NHA; 7	STA; 9	RPS; 22	RIV; 22	TMP; 8	TMP; 32	NHA; 10	STA; 18	MAR; 21	TMP; 17									11th	2502	
1992	N/A	45	Pontiac									TMP; 16																					11th	2502	
1993	Carl Pasteryak	75	Pontiac	RCH; 16	STA; 24	TMP; 7	NHA; 28	NZH; 15	STA; 10	RIV	NHA; 16	RPS	HOL	LEE; 11	RIV; 6	STA; 11	TMP; 4	TMP; 27	STA; 10	TMP; 32													20th	1779	
1994	Carl Pasteryak	75	Pontiac	NHA; 10	STA; 7	TMP; 8	NZH; 27	STA; 6	LEE; 15	TMP; 21	RIV; 5	TIO; 8	NHA; 18	RPS; 7	HOL; 12	TMP; 11	RIV; 8	NHA; 19	**STA**; 3	SPE; 6	TMP; 12	NHA; 9	STA; 15	TMP; 10									7th	2761	
1995	Carl Pasteryak	75	Pontiac	TMP; 26	NHA; 29	STA; 24	NZH; 12	STA; 28	LEE; 28	TMP; 9	RIV		NHA; 12	JEN; 20	RPS; 19	HOL; 15	RIV	NHA; 31	STA	TMP; 40	NHA; 14	STA; 14	TMP; 7	TMP; 17									21st	2003	
1995	Carl Pasteryak	75	Chevy									BEE; 14																					21st	2003	
1996	Carl Pasteryak	75	Pontiac	TMP; 18	STA; 17	NZH; 22	STA; 27	NHA; 23	JEN; 26	RIV	LEE; 17	RPS	HOL	TMP; 15	RIV	NHA; 26	GLN	STA; 10	NHA; 11	NHA; 25	STA; 17	FLE	TMP; 10										24th	1571	
1997	Carl Pasteryak	75	Pontiac	TMP; 17	MAR; 9	STA; 23	NZH; 19	STA; 12	NHA; 26	FLE; 20	JEN; 8	RIV	GLN; 19	NHA; 24	RPS; 14	HOL; 8	TMP; 8	RIV; 25	NHA; 9	GLN; 26	STA; 15	NHA; 40	STA; 26	FLE; 14	TMP; 12	RCH; 19							15th	2484	
1998	Carl Pasteryak	75	Pontiac	RPS; 16	TMP; 10	MAR; 16	STA; 21	NZH; 12	STA; 4	GLN; 24	JEN; 12	RIV; 10	NHA; 11	NHA; 33	LEE; 7	HOL; 5	TMP; 21	NHA; 19	RIV; 28	STA; 16	NHA; 15	TMP; 22	STA; 5	TMP; 11	FLE								12th	2532	
1999	C.C.P. Racing	75	Pontiac	TMP; 5	RPS; 17	STA; 5	RCH; 14	STA; 2	RIV; 15	JEN; 10	NHA; 22	NZH; 22	HOL; 17	TMP; 13	NHA; 16	RIV; 19	GLN; 14	STA; 14	RPS; DNQ	TMP; 4	NHA; 17	STA; 17	MAR; 16	TMP; 6									13th	2541	
2000	Carl Pasteryak	75	Pontiac	STA; 9	RCH; 22	STA; 11	RIV; 14	SEE; 16	NHA; 22	NZH; 38	TMP; 13	RIV; 17	GLN; 24	TMP; 19	STA; 8	WFD; 19	NHA; 24	STA; 16	MAR; 12	TMP; 21													15th	1861	
2001	Carl Pasteryak	75	Pontiac	SBO; 9	TMP; 24	STA; 13	WFD; 27	NZH; 30	STA; 7	RIV; 17	SEE; 9	RCH; 32	NHA; 31	HOL; 19	RIV; 8	CHE; 14	TMP; 9	STA; 19	WFD; 21	TMP; 29	STA	MAR	TMP										22nd	1830	
2002	Carl Pasteryak	75	Pontiac	TMP; 14	STA; 9	WFD; 27	NZH; 39	RIV; DNQ	SEE; 25	RCH; 29	STA; DNQ	BEE; 16	NHA; 28	RIV; DNQ	TMP; 12	STA; DNQ	WFD	TMP; 14	NHA	STA; 24	MAR; 13	TMP; DNQ											24th	1486	
2002	N/A	20	Pontiac								STA; 27																						24th	1486	
2003	Carl Pasteryak	75	Pontiac	TMP; 14	STA; 29	WFD	NZH	STA; 16	LER; 25	BLL	BEE; DNQ	NHA	ADI	RIV	TMP; 31	STA; 30	WFD	TMP; 27	NHA	STA; 19	TMP; 9												33rd	939	
2004	Carl Pasteryak	75	Pontiac	TMP; 26	STA; 30	WFD	NZH	STA; 13	RIV	LER; 17	WAL	BEE; DNQ	NHA	SEE; DNQ	RIV	STA; DNQ	TMP; DNQ	WFD	TMP; 20	NHA	STA; 13	TMP; DNQ											36th	863	
2005	Carl Pasteryak	75	Pontiac	TMP	STA	RIV	WFD	STA; 11	JEN	NHA	BEE	SEE; 26	RIV	STA; 24	TMP; DNQ	WFD	MAR	TMP; 17	NHA	STA; 15	TMP; 31												37th	667	
2006	Rose Pasteryak	75	Pontiac	TMP; DNQ	STA; DNQ	JEN	TMP	STA; 17	NHA	HOL	RIV	STA; DNQ	TMP; 16	MAR	TMP; 22	NHA	WFD	TMP; 28	STA														42nd	505	
2007	Rose Pasteryak	75	Pontiac	TMP; 7	STA; 33	WTO	STA; DNQ	TMP; 17	NHA	TSA	RIV	STA	TMP	MAN	MAR	NHA	TMP	STA; 32	TMP														43rd	444	
2008	Rose Pasteryak	75	Chevy	TMP; 20	STA; 25	STA; DNQ																											38th	614	
2008	Rose Pasteryak	75	Pontiac				TMP; 17	NHA	SPE	RIV	STA; 9	TMP	MAN	TMP	NHA	MAR	CHE	STA	TMP; 17														38th	614	
2009	Rose Pasteryak	75	Pontiac	TMP; 21	STA; 23	STA	NHA	SPE	RIV	STA	BRI	TMP	NHA	MAR	STA; 30	TMP																	41st	267	
