= Richie Evans =

American racing driver (1941–1985)

- Nationality: American
- Born: Richard Ernest Evans; July 23, 1941 Westernville, New York, U.S.
- Died: October 24, 1985 (aged 44) Martinsville, Virginia, U.S.

Winston Modified Tour
- Years active: 1985
- Teams: B. R. DeWitt
- Starts: 28
- Wins: 12
- Poles: 4
- Best finish: 1st in 1985

Previous series
- 1965–1984: NASCAR Modified Division

Championship titles
- 1985 1982–1985 1973, 1978–1984: Winston Modified Tour; Winston Racing Series Northeast; NASCAR Modified Division

Awards
- 2011: NASCAR Hall of Fame

Richard Ernest Evans (July 23, 1941 – October 24, 1985), was an American racing driver who won nine NASCAR National Modified Championships, including eight in a row from 1978 to 1985. The International Motorsports Hall of Fame lists this achievement as "one of the supreme accomplishments in motorsports". Evans won virtually every major race for asphalt modifieds, most of them more than once, including winning the Race of Champions three times. Evans was inducted into the NASCAR Hall of Fame on June 14, 2011. As one of the Class of 2012, Evans was one of the Hall's first 15 inductees, and was the first Hall of Famer from outside the now NASCAR Cup Series.

== Early career ==
Evans left his family's farm in Westernville, New York at the age of 16 to work at a local garage in Rome, New York. After he found early success in street racing, then became a winner in drag racing, a local stock car racer, Chuck Mahoney, suggested he try building a car to race at the nearby Utica-Rome Speedway. He ran his first oval-track car, a 1954 Ford Hobby Stock, numbered PT-109 (after John F. Kennedy's torpedo boat in World War II), in 1962. He advanced to the Modified division, the premier short track division. In 1965, winning his first feature in the season's final night.

== National championships ==
In 1973, Evans became the NASCAR National Modified Champion. In 1978, the "Rapid Roman" won a second title and did not relinquish his crown during the next seven years. Evans took over four hundred feature race wins at racetracks from Quebec to Florida before he died in a crash at Martinsville Speedway while practicing for the Winn-Dixie 500 tripleheader in late 1985 (three races in one day—a 200-lap Modified race, a 200-lap Busch Series race, and a 100-lap Late Model race). Before his crash, Evans had clinched NASCAR's inaugural Winston Modified Tour (now known as Whelen Modified Tour) championship a week earlier at Thompson, Connecticut.

== Regional championships ==
In 1982, NASCAR created the Whelen All-American Series, then known as the Winston Racing Series, to reward successful short-track racers and to provide incentives for them to support their local weekly short tracks, known now as NASCAR Home Tracks.

Evans was Holland Speedway's first NASCAR champion (1982). He won the Northeast Region championship all four years that he competed in it, from 1982 through 1985, but did not win the national championship.

== Fatal crash and legacy ==
On October 24, 1985, Evans, who had clinched the 1985 National Modified title the week before at Thompson, was practicing for the Winn-Dixie 500 Modified race at Martinsville Speedway in Martinsville, Virginia (the races featured 200-lap Modified and Busch Grand National, and a 100-lap Late Model feature). He crashed heavily into the concrete retaining wall in Turn 3, and perished in the accident.

Evans' signature paint scheme, truck fleet color Swamp Holly Orange, began with "borrowed" paint from the local highway department garage.

NASCAR named Evans as one of the sports' 50 Greatest Drivers during its 50th anniversary year in 1998. On January 20, 2012, Evans was inducted into the NASCAR Hall Of Fame.

Evans is survived by wife Lynn and six children: Jodi Lynn (Evans) Meola, Janelle Ralaine (Evans) Walda, Jill Ann Evans, Jacqueline Marie (Evans) Williams, Richard Edwin Evans (who has raced under the moniker "Richie Evans Jr.") and Tara Denise (Evans) Farrell.

== Awards and honors ==
=== Track championships ===
(30 championships at 11 tracks in 4 states. All were in the Modified division on paved tracks.)

- Thompson Speedway (Thompson, Connecticut): 5 (1980–81, 1983–1985)
- Utica-Rome Speedway (Vernon, New York): 4 (1972–74, 1978)
- Holland Speedway (Holland, New York): 4 (1978–80, 1982)
- Spencer Speedway (Williamson, New York): 4 (1977–78, 1983, 1985)
- Fulton Speedway (Volney, New York): 3 (1970–71, 1974)
- Shangri-La Speedway (Owego, New York): 3 (1975, 1977, 1982)
- New Egypt Speedway (New Egypt, New Jersey): 2 (1979, 1982)
- Stafford Speedway (Stafford Springs, Connecticut): 2 (1980–81)
- Chemung Speedrome (Chemung, New York): 1 (1978)
- Oswego Speedway (Oswego, New York): 1 (1983)
- Riverside Park Speedway (Agawam, Massachusetts): 1 (1980)

=== Other acknowledgements ===
- NASCAR Connecticut State Champion (1980–1981)
- NASCAR Winston Racing Series Northeast Region Champion (1982–1985)
- New Smyrna World Series of Racing Modified Champion (1977, 1979–1981, 1983–1984)
- 2-time Daytona International Speedway Modified Race winner (1979–1980)
- 3-time Modified Race of Champions winner

1973 – Trenton (NJ) Speedway (1.50 mile track)
1979 – Pocono (PA) Raceway (2.50 mile track)
1980 – Pocono (PA) Raceway (0.75 mile track)

=== Feature race victories ===
(518 feature wins known = 516 in Modifieds, 1 in Limited Sportsmen, and 1 in Supermodifieds, at 40 tracks in 12 U.S. states and 2 Canadian provinces).

- Shangri-La Speedway (Owego, New York): 66 (1972–1985)
- Spencer Speedway (Williamson, New York): 52 (1969–1985)
- Fulton Speedway (Fulton, New York): 44 (1968–1977), and 1 Limited Sportsman win (1970)
- New Smyrna Speedway (New Smyrna Beach, Florida): 39 (1976–1985)
- Stafford Motor Speedway (Stafford Springs, Connecticut): 38 (1975–1985)
- Utica-Rome Speedway (Vernon, New York): 33 (1965–1978)
- Riverside Park Speedway (Agawam, Massachusetts): 32 (1978–1984)
- Thompson Speedway (Thompson, Connecticut): 35 (1975–1985), and 1 Supermodified win
- New Egypt Speedway (New Egypt, New Jersey): 25 (1976–1985)
- Lancaster Speedway (Lancaster, New York): 23 (1969–1976)
- Albany-Saratoga Speedway (Malta, New York): 17 (1970–1976)
- Islip Speedway (Islip, New York): 18 (1970–1983)
- Oswego Speedway (Oswego, New York): 13 (1972–1985)
- Holland International Speedway (Holland, New York): 11 (1977–1985)
- Martinsville Speedway (Martinsville, Virginia): 10 (1973–1983)
- Monadnock Speedway (Winchester, New Hampshire): 3 (1978–1981)
- Pocono Raceway (Long Pond, Pennsylvania): 3 (1979 on 2.5-mile superspeedway, 1972 and 1980 on 3/4-mile oval)
- Bowman Gray Stadium (Winston-Salem, North Carolina): 2 (1979–1980)
- Caraway Speedway (Asheboro, North Carolina): 3 (1973–1979)
- Chemung Speedrome (Chemung, New York): 3 (1978)
- Daytona International Speedway (Daytona Beach, Florida): 2 (1979–1980)
- Freeport Stadium (Freeport, New York): 3 (1975–1976)
- Hickory Speedway (Hickory, North Carolina): 3 (1972–1979)
- Oxford Plains Speedway (Oxford, Maine): 2 (1982–1985)
- Seekonk Speedway (Seekonk, Massachusetts): 2 (1979–1983)
- Trenton Speedway (Trenton, New Jersey): 2 (1973–1978)
- Catamount Stadium (Milton, Vermont): 1 (1970)
- Plattsburgh Speedway (Plattsburgh, New York): 1 (1971)
- Devil's Bowl Speedway (West Haven, Vermont): 1 (1971)
- Twin State Speedway (Claremont, New Hampshire): 1 (1985)
- Deux-Montagnes Speedway (Saint-Eustache, Quebec): 1 (1979)
- Evans Mills Speedway (Evans Mills, New York): 1 (1970)
- Franklin County Speedway (Callaway, Virginia): 1 (1979)
- Kingsport Speedway (Kingsport, Tennessee): 1 (1979)
- Metrolina Speedway (Charlotte, North Carolina): 1 (1974)
- Riverhead Raceway (Riverhead, New York): 1 (1985)
- Star Speedway (Epping, New Hampshire): 2 (1979–1984)
- Wall Stadium (Wall Township, New Jersey): 1 (1971)
- Weedsport Speedway (Weedsport, New York): 1 (1971, Evans' only win on dirt)
- Capital City Speedway (Stittsville, Ottawa, Ontario): 18 (1967–1976)

=== Recognition ===
- Named No. 1 on NASCAR's Modified all-time Top 10 list (2003)
- Only retired number in NASCAR in any series – No. 61 on the Whelen Modified Tour (Unofficial).
- As part of NASCAR's 50th Anniversary celebration in 1998, Evans was named one of NASCAR's 50 Greatest Drivers of All Time.
- Selected by fans as NASCAR Modifieds' Most Popular Driver nine times
- International Motorsports Hall of Fame (1996)
- National Motorsports Press Association (NMPA) Hall of Fame (1986)
- New York State Stock Car Association Hall of Fame
- New England Auto Racers Hall of Fame inaugural 1998 class
- FOAR SCORE Hall of Fame: 1986 – inaugural class
- Oswego Speedway Hall of Fame (2000)
- As part of the 25th anniversary of the NASCAR Weekly Series in 2006, Evans was named one of the series' All Time Top 25 drivers.
- Nominated in the class of 2010 as one of the potential 5 inaugural inductees to the NASCAR Hall of Fame, July 2, 2009.
- Evans' No. 61 was retired at his home track – Utica-Rome Speedway in Vernon, New York in 2008.
- Nominated in the class of 2011 as one of the potential 5 inductees of 2011 to the NASCAR Hall of Fame, July 1, 2010.
- In the 1985 IROC Series, every orange car featured a '61' on the rear fender to honor Evans and his orange No. 61 car.
- Elected to the NASCAR Hall of Fame on June 14, 2011 with Cale Yarborough, Darrell Waltrip, Dale Inman and Glen Wood.
- Inducted to the NASCAR Hall of Fame in Charlotte, NC on January 20, 2012.
- Named one of NASCAR's 75 Greatest Drivers (2023)

== Motorsports career results ==
=== NASCAR ===
(key) (Bold – Pole position awarded by qualifying time. Italics – Pole position earned by points standings or practice time. * – Most laps led.)

==== Winston Modified Tour ====
NASCAR Winston Modified Tour results
Year	Car owner	No.	Make	1	2	3	4	5	6	7	8	9	10	11	12	13	14	15	16	17	18	19	20	21	22	23	24	25	26	27	28	29	NWMTC	Pts	Ref
1985	B. R. DeWitt	61	Chevy	TMP; 1	MAR; 19	STA; 1	**MAR**; 12*	NEG; 1	WFD; 15	NEG; 6	SPN; 3	RIV; 20	CLA; 1*	STA; 1*	TMP; 1	NEG; 1*	HOL; 1	HOL; 13	RIV; 15	CAT; 4	EPP; 3	TMP; 1	WFD; 6	RIV; 1	STA; 2	**TMP**; 1*	POC; 6	TIO; 3	OXF; 1	STA; 26	TMP; 6	MAR; Wth^{†}	1st	4215	
^{†} – Fatal accident
