= Ted Christopher =

American racing driver (1958–2017)

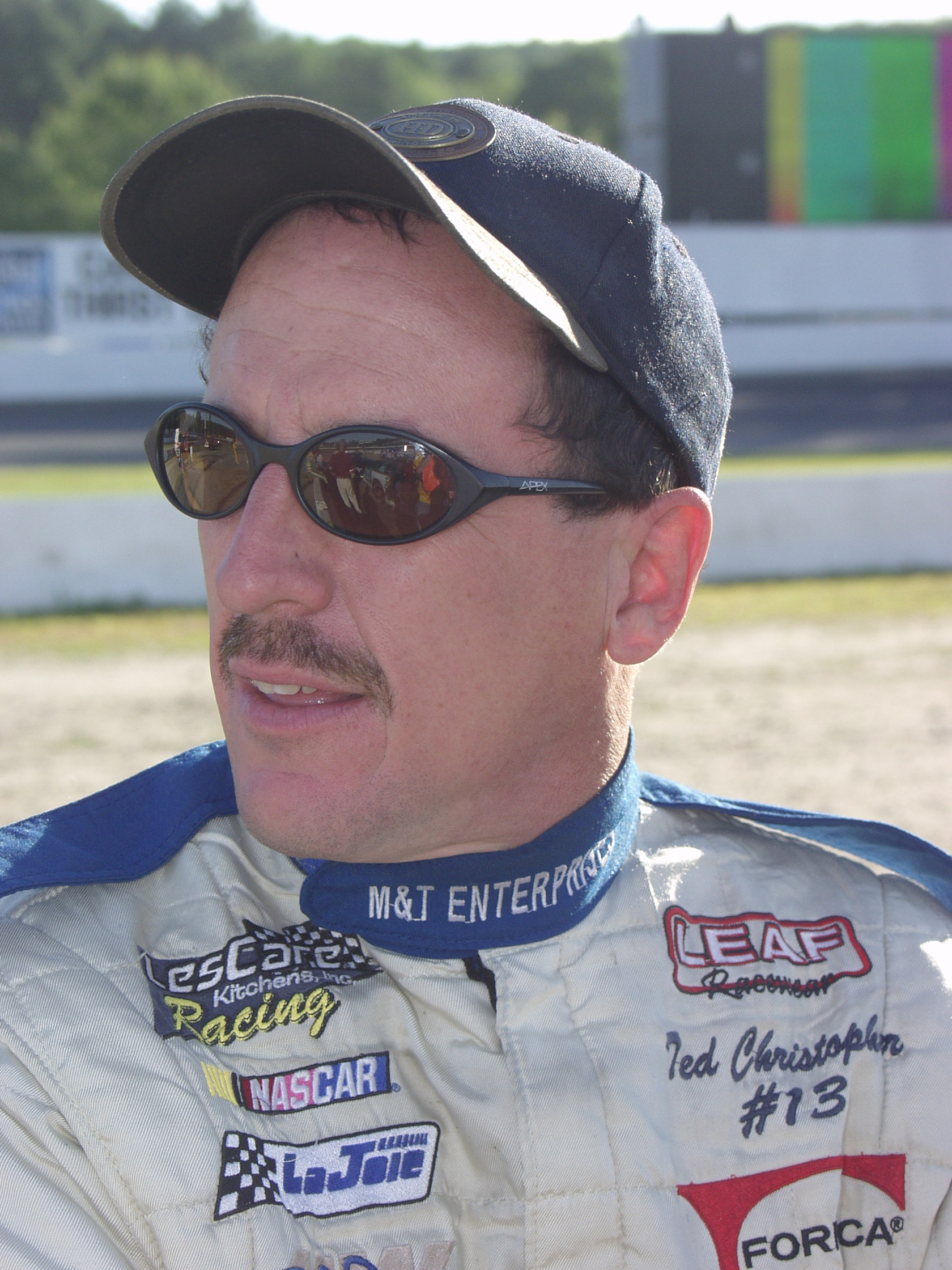
- Christopher in 2001
- Born: June 5, 1958; Plainville, Connecticut, U.S.
- Died: September 16, 2017 (aged 59); North Branford, Connecticut, U.S.
- Achievements: 2008 Whelen Modified Tour Champion; 48 victories in NASCAR modified competition (42 in Whelen Modified; 6 in Southern Modified)

NASCAR Cup Series career
- 6 races run over 4 years
- 2009 position: 75th
- Best finish: 64th (1999)
- First race: 1999 Frontier @ the Glen (Watkins Glen)
- Last race: 2006 Sylvania 300 (Loudon)
Wins	Top tens	Poles
0	0	0

NASCAR O'Reilly Auto Parts Series career
- 21 races run over 6 years
- 2001 position: 102nd
- Best finish: 61st (1997)
- First race: 1996 Meridian Advantage 200 (Nazareth)
- Last race: 2001 Nazareth 200 (Nazareth)
Wins	Top tens	Poles
0	2	0

NASCAR FedEx Freight Truck Series career
- 2 races run over 2 years
- 1999 position: 88th
- Best finish: 88th (1999)
- First race: 1997 Parts America 150 (Watkins Glen)
- Last race: 1999 Bully Hill Vineyards 150 (Watkins Glen)
Wins	Top tens	Poles
0	1	0
- Statistics up to date as of September 3, 2014.

Theodore Christopher (June 5, 1958 – September 16, 2017) was an American professional racing driver and business owner who raced and won in many different types of race cars, including Modifieds, SK Modifieds, ISMA, Camping World East Series, Late Models, Pro Stocks, and Midgets. He also raced in NASCAR's Cup Series, Xfinity Series, and Camping World Truck Series. He is best known for competing in NASCAR's Whelen Modified Tour, where he has over forty victories and a championship in 2008. He was also well known for his success on the 1.058-mile (1.703 km) New Hampshire Motor Speedway where Christopher has won five Camping World East Series events and five Whelen Modified Tour events.

Christopher was an aggressive driver, known for his infamous "Three Tap Rule" when passing cars in front of him, though his driving style changed in his later career and brought more success to his racing career.

== Racing career ==
2001 NASCAR Weekly Series national champion, winning fifteen of the eighteen races that he entered, clinching it at Thompson International Speedway in Connecticut.

2008 NASCAR Whelen Modified Tour champion. Christopher, who is known as one of the most accomplished drivers in the Northeast, won both the championship and the final race of the season at Thompson International Speedway. Christopher came into the race leading the championship standings over Matt Hirschman by 31 points. Late in the race, Hirschman suffered an electrical problem, which put him a handful of laps off the pace. Christopher drove on to win the event, with Hirschman finishing 21 laps down in 25th position. It was his 31st career win in his twelfth full-time year of competition.

Ironically, three years prior in 2005, Christopher went to the season finale at Thompson holding a 36-point lead over Hirschman's father, five-time tour champion Tony Hirschman, only to lose the championship due to a crash on lap 11.

NASCAR Whelen Modified Tour: . . . 48 Victories (third all-time). Three times voted Most Popular Driver (2008,09,10)

NASCAR K&N Pro Series East: . . . 10 victories.

Stafford (CT) Speedway . . . 131 Feature Race victories (all-time track record). 9 time SK Modified Champion. Only active driver to ever have a Stafford grandstand named for him.

Thompson (CT) Int'l Speedway . . . 99 Feature Race victories (all-time track record). 4 time SK Modified Champion.

Waterford (CT) Speedbowl . . . 47 Feature Race victories (17th all-time). 1992 SK Modified Champion

In addition to his racing in the Modifieds and Busch North/K&N East, Christopher also attempted numerous Winston/Nextel Cup, Busch Series, and Craftsman Truck Series races in the 2000s. He attempted and qualified for his first Cup race at Watkins Glen in 1999. His last Cup race came in the 2006 Sylvania 300 and last attempt in the 2009 Lenox Industrial Tools 301 for Kirk Shelmerdine.

In the NASCAR Busch Series, Christopher competed part-time in 1998 with Marsh Racing, competing in three races for the team. Driving the No. 13 Whelen Engineering Chevrolet, Christopher posted the best finish of tenth at Nazareth. In 1999, the team attempted twelve races, again with Christopher driving the car. The team would make five races and posted the best finish of eighth at Nazareth.

Christopher also competed for the then new team of Michael Waltrip Racing, competing in three races with the team at Loudon, Watkins Glen, and the inaugural race at Memphis. The last race he competed in was at Nazareth in 2001 with Richard Childress Racing in the All-Star car No. 21 Rockwell Automation Chevy. He finished nineteenth two laps down from the winner Greg Biffle.

== The "Three Tap Rule" ==
The three NASCAR-sanctioned tracks in Connecticut use a handicap lineup system that starts the fastest cars deep in the field. A thirty green flag lap feature gives drivers little time to be courteous if they want to win. Throughout his career, Christopher employed an aggressive driving style he referred to as the "Three Tap Rule." A combination of intimidation techniques most famously used by Dale Earnhardt in the NASCAR Cup Series as well as the "chrome horn" and "bump-and-run" techniques commonly employed in short track racing, Christopher uses a trio of taps to coerce a slower competitor into moving over or ultimately moving them himself. The initial tap informs his competitor that he is there, while the second bump is a warning to commit to a lane to let him by. If needed, the third and final tap is the classic bump and run, with Christopher moving the car in front out of his racing groove to move on by.

== Death ==
Christopher was killed in a plane crash in North Branford near the Guilford, Connecticut, town line on September 16, 2017, while en route from Robertson Field in Plainville, Connecticut, to Francis S. Gabreski Airport in Westhampton Beach, New York, to compete in a Whelen Modified Tour race that evening at the Riverhead Raceway, in Calverton, New York, on Long Island. Christopher and Charles "Pat" Dundas, the pilot and family friend from Hauppauge, New York, who also died, were the only occupants of the Mooney M20C that went down in a wooded area. An NTSB report released in 2019 attributed the crash to fuel starvation due to pieces of towel cloth obstructing a fuel line. The aircraft impacted pine trees 1,500 feet (460 m) away from an open field where investigators believed the aircraft may have been attempting an emergency landing.

== Personal life ==
He was born to William Christopher and Lucy Graziano. He had a wife, Quinn Wazorko Christopher, and had no children with her. Christopher also had a twin brother, Mike, who also raced Modifieds, and Mike's son Mike Jr., has also begun racing Modifieds. Christopher was a 1976 graduate of Plainville High School and was a captain of the school's wrestling team. In 2013, he was inducted into the Plainville Sports Hall of Fame. He also owned and operated M&T Enterprises, which rebuilds transmissions for heavy trucks.

== Honors ==
- As part of the 25th anniversary of the NASCAR Weekly Series in 2006, Christopher was named one of the series' All Time Top 25 drivers.
- In 2008 Stafford Motor Speedway named a section of their grandstand for him in honor of his 100th victory at Stafford. Christopher, who had 109 victories at the prestigious and storied Connecticut oval, is Stafford's all-time winningest driver.
- Christopher was the first driver to win SK modified track championships at all three Connecticut NASCAR Whelen All-American Series asphalt, oval short-tracks (Stafford Motor Speedway, Thompson International Speedway, and the Waterford Speedbowl) during his career. The feat was later accomplished by Keith Rocco in 2010, the year he won his first SK Modified Championship at Waterford after multiple titles at the other two.
- His twin brother Mike Christopher won before he did at Stafford. Also, the two started out racing go karts around Connecticut and the U.S. They were famous at The Pomfret Speedway in Pomfret, CT. The two also road raced with enduro karts at Daytona International Speedway, Pocono Raceway, Watkins Glen and many others.

== Motorsports career results ==
=== NASCAR ===
(key) (Bold – Pole position awarded by qualifying time. Italics – Pole position earned by points standings or practice time. * – Most laps led. ** – All laps led.)

==== Sprint Cup Series ====
NASCAR Sprint Cup Series results
Year	Team	No.	Make	1	2	3	4	5	6	7	8	9	10	11	12	13	14	15	16	17	18	19	20	21	22	23	24	25	26	27	28	29	30	31	32	33	34	35	36	NSCC	Pts	Ref
1999	Ted Christopher Racing	13	Chevy	DAY	CAR	LVS	ATL	DAR	TEX	BRI	MAR	TAL	CAL	RCH	CLT	DOV	MCH	POC	SON	DAY	NHA	POC	IND	GLN; 31	MCH	BRI	DAR	RCH	NHA	DOV	MAR	CLT	TAL	CAR	PHO	HOM	ATL			64th	70	
2004	Kirk Shelmerdine Racing	72	Ford	DAY	CAR	LVS	ATL	DAR	BRI	TEX	MAR	TAL	CAL	RCH	CLT	DOV	POC	MCH	SON	DAY	CHI	NHA; 36	POC	IND	GLN	MCH	BRI	CAL	RCH											79th	89	
2004	Hover Motorsports	80	Ford																											NHA; 43	DOV	TAL	KAN	CLT	MAR	ATL	PHO	DAR	HOM	79th	89	
2005	Kirk Shelmerdine Racing	27	Ford	DAY	CAL	LVS	ATL	BRI	MAR	TEX	PHO	TAL	DAR	RCH	CLT	DOV	POC	MCH	SON	DAY	CHI	NHA; 42	POC	IND	GLN	MCH	BRI	CAL	RCH											76th	74	
2005	Mach 1 Motorsports	34	Chevy																											NHA; 42	DOV	TAL	KAN	CLT	MAR	ATL	TEX	PHO	HOM	76th	74	
2006	Front Row Motorsports	61	Chevy	DAY	CAL	LVS	ATL	BRI	MAR	TEX	PHO	TAL	RCH	DAR	CLT	DOV	POC	MCH	SON	DAY	CHI	NHA; DNQ	POC	IND	GLN	MCH	BRI	CAL												73rd	40	
2006	Kirk Shelmerdine Racing	27	Chevy																										RCH; DNQ	NHA; 41	DOV	KAN	TAL	CLT	MAR; DNQ	ATL	TEX	PHO	HOM	73rd	40	
2009	Kirk Shelmerdine Racing	27	Toyota	DAY	CAL	LVS	ATL	BRI	MAR	TEX	PHO	TAL	RCH	DAR	CLT	DOV	POC	MCH	SON	NHA; DNQ	DAY	CHI	IND	POC	GLN	MCH	BRI	ATL	RCH	NHA	DOV	KAN	CAL	CLT	MAR	TAL	TEX	PHO	HOM	75th	–	

==== Busch Series ====
NASCAR Busch Series results
Year	Team	No.	Make	1	2	3	4	5	6	7	8	9	10	11	12	13	14	15	16	17	18	19	20	21	22	23	24	25	26	27	28	29	30	31	32	33	NBSC	Pts	Ref
1996	James Lestorti	13	Chevy	DAY	CAR	RCH	ATL	NSV	DAR	BRI	HCY	NZH; 41	CLT	DOV	SBO	MYB	GLN	MLW	NHA	TAL	IRP	MCH	BRI	DAR	RCH	DOV	CLT	CAR									94th	67	
1996	James Lestorti	31	Chevy																										HOM; 32								94th	67	
1997	James Lestorti	13	Chevy	DAY	CAR	RCH; 18	ATL	LVS	DAR	HCY	TEX	BRI	NSV	TAL	NHA; 18	NZH; 13	CLT	DOV	SBO	GLN; 35	MLW	MYB	GTY	IRP	MCH	BRI	DAR	RCH; 37	DOV	CLT	CAL	CAR	HOM; 34				61st	392	
1998	Marsh Racing	13	Chevy	DAY	CAR	LVS	NSV	DAR	BRI	TEX	HCY	TAL	NHA; 43	NZH; 10	CLT	DOV	RCH; DNQ	PPR	GLN; 13	MLW	MYB	CAL	SBO	IRP				RCH; DNQ	DOV	CLT	GTY	CAR; DNQ	ATL	HOM; DNQ			104th	86	
1998	Lockamy Racing	28	Chevy																						MCH; 38	BRI	DAR										104th	86	
1999	Marsh Racing	13	Chevy	DAY	CAR	LVS	ATL	DAR	TEX	NSV	BRI; DNQ	TAL	CAL	NHA; 12	RCH; DNQ	NZH; 8	CLT	DOV; 30	SBO	GLN; DNQ	MLW; 40	MYB	PPR	GTY; 29	IRP	MCH; DNQ	BRI	DAR	RCH; DNQ	DOV; DNQ	CLT	CAR	MEM	PHO			66th	461	
1999	Lockamy Racing	28	Chevy																																HOM; DNQ		66th	461	
2000	Michael Waltrip Racing	7	Chevy	DAY	CAR	LVS	ATL	DAR	BRI	TEX	NSV	TAL	CAL	RCH	NHA; 29	CLT	DOV	SBO	MYB	GLN; 30	MLW	NZH	PPR	GTY	IRP	MCH	BRI	DAR	RCH	DOV	CLT	CAR					81st	228	
2000	Michael Waltrip Racing	99	Chevy																														MEM; 28	PHO	HOM		81st	228	
2001	Richard Childress Racing	21	Chevy	DAY	CAR	LVS	ATL	DAR	BRI	TEX	NSH	TAL	CAL	RCH	NHA	NZH; 19	CLT	DOV	KEN	MLW	GLN	CHI	GTY	PPR	IRP	MCH	BRI	DAR	RCH	DOV	KAN	CLT	MEM	PHO	CAR	HOM	102nd	106	

==== Craftsman Truck Series ====
NASCAR Craftsman Truck Series results
Year	Team	No.	Make	1	2	3	4	5	6	7	8	9	10	11	12	13	14	15	16	17	18	19	20	21	22	23	24	25	26	NCTC	Pts	Ref
1997	Roehrig Motorsports	18	Dodge	WDW	TUS	HOM	PHO	POR	EVG	I70	NHA	TEX	BRI	NZH	MLW	LVL	CNS	HPT	IRP	FLM	NSV	GLN; 7	RCH	MAR	SON	MMR	CAL	PHO	LVS	94th	146	
1999	CJ Racing	17	Ford	HOM	PHO	EVG	MMR	MAR	MEM	PPR	I70	BRI	TEX	PIR	GLN; 18	MLW	NSV	NZH	MCH	NHA	IRP	GTY	HPT	RCH	LVS	LVL	TEX	CAL		88th	109	

==== Camping World East Series ====
NASCAR Camping World East Series results
Year	Team	No.	Make	1	2	3	4	5	6	7	8	9	10	11	12	13	14	15	16	17	18	19	20	21	22	23	24	NCWESC	Pts	Ref
1990	Marsh Racing	13	Buick	DAY	RCH	CAR	MAR	OXF	NZH	OXF	DOV	JEN	EPP	MND	OXF	NHA	HOL	OXF	IRP	OXF	TMP; 11	RPS	NHA; 19	TMP; 14	DOV	EPP	NHA	36th	357	
1991	Marsh Racing	13	Chevy	DAY	RCH	CAR	NHA	OXF	NZH	MND	OXF	TMP	HOL	JEN	EPP	STA; 9	OXF	NHA	FLE	OXF	TMP; 28	NHA	RPS	TMP; 33	DOV	EPP	NHA	51st	217	
1992	Marsh Racing	13	Olds	DAY	CAR	RCH	NHA	NZH	MND	OXF	DOV	LEE	JEN	OXF	NHA	OXF	HOL	EPP	NHA	RPS	OXF	NHA; 24	EPP					69th	91	
1993	Marsh Racing	13	Olds	LEE	NHA; 17	MND	NZH	HOL	GLN; 5	JEN	STA; 4	GLN																37th	479	
1993	Marsh Racing	1	Olds										NHA; 37	WIS	NHA	NHA	RPS	TMP	WMM	LEE	EPP	LRP						37th	479	
1994	Marsh Racing	13	Olds	NHA	NHA	MND	NZH	SPE	HOL	GLN; 36	JEN	EPP	GLN	NHA; 22	WIS	STA; 20	TMP	MND	WMM	RPS	LEE	NHA; 36	LRP					47th	310	
1995	James Lestorti	13	Olds	DAY	NHA; 38	LEE; DNQ	JEN	NHA	NZH	HOL	BEE	TMP	GLN	NHA; 38	TIO	MND	GLN; 29	EPP	RPS; 22	LEE; 2	STA; 9							28th	1041	
1995	James Lestorti	13	Chevy																			BEE; 13	NHA; 35	TMP; 26	LRP; 32			28th	1041	
1996	James Lestorti	13	Chevy	DAY	LEE; 7	JEN	NZH; 41	HOL	NHA; 36	TIO	BEE	TMP	NZH; 20	NHA; 38	STA; 22	GLN; 16	EPP	RPS	LEE; 28	NHA; 37	NHA; 1*	BEE	TMP; 34	LRP; 8				28th	1171	
1997	James Lestorti	13	Chevy	DAY	LEE	JEN	NHA; 32	NZH; 13	HOL	**NHA**; 22	STA; 15	BEE	TMP	NZH	TIO	NHA; 20	STA; 3	THU	GLN; 1*	EPP	RPS	BEE; 13	TMP	NHA; 1*	LRP; 1			26th	1338	
1998	Marsh Racing	13	Chevy	LEE	RPS	NHA; 13	NZH; 10	HOL	GLN; 13	STA; 25*	NHA; 16	DOV	STA; 27	NHA; 40	GLN; 19	EPP	JEN	**NHA**; 1*	THU	TMP	BEE	LRP						31st	1027	
1999	James Lestorti	13	Chevy	LEE	RPS	NHA; 40	TMP	NZH	HOL	BEE	JEN	GLN; DNQ	STA	NHA; 2	NZH	STA	NHA	GLN; 2	EPP	THU	BEE	NHA; 2	LRP; 8					37th	695	
2000	James Lestorti	13	Chevy	LEE	NHA; 42	SEE	HOL	BEE	JEN	GLN	STA; 1*	NHA; 11	NZH	STA; 26	WFD	GLN; 34	EPP				NHA; 43	LRP; 5						34th	737	
2000	Delcrest Sign Co.	68	Chevy															TMP; 36	THU	BEE								34th	737	
2001	James Lestorti	13	Chevy	LEE	NHA; 1*	SEE	HOL	BEE	EPP	STA; 22	WFD	BEE			STA; 29	SEE	GLN; 34	**NZH**; 28	THU	BEE	DOV	STA; 10	LRP					32nd	865	
2001	James Lestorti	13	Pontiac										**TMP**; 9	NHA; 21														32nd	865	
2002	James Lestorti	13	Chevy	LEE	NHA	NZH; 1	SEE	BEE	STA	HOL	WFD	TMP	NHA	STA	GLN; 30	ADI	THU	BEE										38th	408	
2002	James Lestorti	13	Pontiac																NHA; 26	DOV								38th	408	
2002	Jennifer Wilkinson	28	Chevy																		STA; DNQ	LRP						38th	408	
2003	Marsh Racing	13	Chevy	LEE	STA	ERI	BEE	STA	HOL	TMP	NHA; 33	WFD	SEE	GLN; 1	ADI	BEE	THU	NHA; 17	STA; 24	LRP								34th	447	
2005	NDS Motorsports	35	Chevy	STA; 4	HOL	ERI				STA; 3	DUB	OXF				TMP; 9												22nd	865	
2005	NDS Motorsports	35	Ford				NHA; 32	WFD	ADI				NHA; 1	DOV; 6	LRP													22nd	865	
2006	NDS Motorsports	35	Ford	GRE	STA; 23	HOL	TMP	ERI	NHA	ADI	WFD	NHA	DOV	LRP														58th	94	
2008	Marsh Racing	31	Chevy	GRE	IOW	SBO	GLN	NHA	TMP	NSH	ADI	LRP	MFD	NHA	DOV	STA; 20												67th	108	

==== Autozone West Series ====
NASCAR Autozone West Series results
Year	Team	No.	Make	1	2	3	4	5	6	7	8	9	10	11	12	NAWSC	Pts	Ref
2005	NDS Motorsports	35	Ford	PHO	MMR	PHO; 23	S99	IRW	EVG	S99	PPR	CAL	DCS	CTS	MMR	60th	94	
2006	NDS Motorsports	35	Ford	PHO	PHO; 21	S99	IRW	SON	DCS	IRW	EVG	S99	CAL	CTS	AMP	67th	105	

==== Whelen Modified Tour ====
NASCAR Whelen Modified Tour results
Year	Car owner	No.	Make	1	2	3	4	5	6	7	8	9	10	11	12	13	14	15	16	17	18	19	20	21	22	23	24	25	26	27	28	NWMTC	Pts	Ref
1987	Info not available			ROU	MAR	TMP	STA	CNB	STA	MND	WFD	JEN	SPE	RIV	TMP	RPS	EPP	RIV	STA	TMP; 23	RIV	SEE										NA	0	
1987		7																					STA; 20	POC	TIO	TMP	OXF	TMP	ROU	MAR	STA	NA	0	
1988		71		ROU	MAR	TMP	MAR	JEN	IRP	MND	OSW	OSW	RIV	JEN	RPS	TMP	RIV	OSW	TMP; 31	OXF	OSW	TMP; 37	POC	TIO	TMP; 10	ROU	MAR					NA	0	
1989	Enfield Motorsports	37	Chevy	MAR	TMP	MAR	JEN	STA; 19	IRP	OSW	WFD; 16	MND	RIV	OSW	JEN	STA	RPS	RIV	OSW	TMP	TMP	RPS	OSW	TMP	POC	STA; 15	TIO	MAR				38th	434	
1989	Enfield Motorsports	37	Pontiac																										TMP; 10			38th	434	
1990	Enfield Motorsports	37	Pontiac	MAR	RCH	TMP	STA; 24	MAR	TMP	STA	MND	HOL	STA	RIV	JEN	EPP	RPS	RIV	TMP	RPS	NHA	TMP	POC	STA	TMP	MAR						NA	0	
1993		30	Chevy	RCH	STA	TMP	NHA	NZH	STA	RIV	TMP	RPS	HOL	LEE	RIV	STA	TMP	TMP; 11	STA; 14	TMP; 23												NA	0	
1994		30	Chevy	NHA; 40	STA; 25	TMP; 21	NZH	**STA**; 27	LEE; 24	TMP; 5	RIV	TIO; 9	NHA; 9	RPS; 21	HOL; 8	TMP; 12	RIV; 9	NHA; 4	STA; 8	SPE; 15	TMP; 13	NHA; 11	STA; 13	TMP; 8								15th	2383	
1995		30	Chevy	TMP; 31	NHA; 36	STA; 7	**NZH**; 28																									27th	1399	
1995	Mystique Motorsports	82	Chevy					STA; 6	LEE	TMP; 15	RIV	BEE	NHA; 17	JEN	RPS	HOL	RIV	NHA; 15	**STA**; 25													27th	1399	
1995	Mystique Motorsports	13	Chevy																	TMP; 35	NHA; 17	STA; 28	TMP; 29	TMP; 9								27th	1399	
1996	Mystique Motorsports	13	Chevy	TMP	STA; 15	NZH; 39	**STA**; 29							**TMP**; 32	RIV	NHA; 27	GLN; 22	STA; 28	NHA; 10	NHA; 27	STA; 16	FLE; 29	TMP; 19									27th	1270	
1996	Bear Motorsports	14	Chevy					NHA; 34	JEN	RIV; 27	LEE	RPS	HOL																			27th	1270	
1997	Mystique Motorsports	13	Chevy	TMP; 26			NZH; 17		NHA; 5				GLN; 3	NHA; 17			TMP; 11	RIV	NHA; 35	GLN; 32		NHA; 15										21st	2092	
1997			Chevy		MAR; 32	STA; 8		STA; 7				RIV; 3			RPS; 20	HOL					STA; 28											21st	2092	
1997	Bear Motorsports	1	Chevy							FLE; 14	JEN													FLE; 34	TMP							21st	2092	
1997	Bear Motorsports	14	Chevy																				STA; 33									21st	2092	
1997	Joe Brady	00	Chevy																							RCH; 8						21st	2092	
1998	Bear Motorsports	14	Chevy	RPS; 18	TMP; 14	MAR	STA; 30	NZH; 40	STA; 29																							30th	1032	
1998	Mystique Motorsports	13	Chevy							GLN; 32	JEN	RIV	NHA	NHA; 38	LEE	HOL	TMP	NHA; 5	RIV	STA	NHA	TMP	STA; 33									30th	1032	
1998	Mystique Motorsports	00	Chevy																					TMP; 9	FLE; 13							30th	1032	
1999			Chevy	TMP; 27	RPS; 10	STA; 16		STA; 6						TMP; 12				STA; 26														15th	2285	
1999	Mystique Motorsports	00	Chevy				RCH; 1		RIV; 28	JEN	NHA; 4	NZH; 7	HOL		NHA; 2	RIV			RPS; 11	TMP; 29			MAR; 20									15th	2285	
1999	Mystique Motorsports	13	Chevy														GLN; 1*				NHA; 3	**STA**; 30		TMP; 11								15th	2285	
2000	Wynn's Mystic Motorsports	13	Chevy	STA; 26	RCH; 9	STA; 6	**RIV**; 5	SEE; 25	NHA; 30	NZH; 3	**TMP**; 3*																					5th	2326	
2000	Wynn's Mystic Motorsports	00	Chevy									RIV; 10	**GLN**; 1**																			5th	2326	
2000		25	Dodge											TMP; 1*	STA; 17*	**WFD**; 16	NHA; 6	STA; 3*	MAR; 19	TMP; 3												5th	2326	
2001		25	Dodge	SBO; 3	TMP; 8	STA; 3*	WFD; 3	**NZH**; 39	STA; 23*	RIV; 7	SEE; 3	RCH; 7	NHA; 21*	HOL; 2*	RIV; 22	CHE	TMP; 31	STA; 26		**TMP**; 3*	STA; 1*	MAR; 5	TMP; 1*									6th	2606	
2001	Wynn's Mystic Motorsports	00	Chevy																WFD; 2*													6th	2606	
2002	Mystique Motorsports	13	Chevy	TMP; 7	STA; 1*	WFD; 29	NZH; 36	**RIV**; 1	SEE; 8	RCH; 13	**STA**; 1**	BEE; 28	NHA; 30	RIV; 4	TMP; 5	STA; 1	WFD; 1*	TMP; 21	NHA; 4	STA; 5	MAR; 9	TMP; 3										2nd	2628	
2003	Mystique Motorsports	13	Chevy	TMP; 32	**STA**; 1	WFD; 2	NZH; 1*	STA; 4	LER; 21	WAL; 3	BEE; 6	NHA; 8	ADI; 5	RIV; 2	TMP; 7	STA; 18	WFD; 17	TMP; 25	NHA; 2	STA; 9	TMP; 15											4th	2520	
2004	Mystique Motorsports	13	Chevy	TMP; 1	STA; 6	WFD; 15	NZH; 3	STA; 9*	RIV; 4	LER; 18	WAL; 23	BEE; 22	NHA; 1*	SEE; 8	RIV; 23	STA; 28	TMP; 4	WFD; 30	TMP; 3	NHA; 1*	STA; 10	TMP; 23										4th	2512	
2005	Mystique Motorsports	13	Chevy	TMP; 1*	STA; 5	RIV; 1*	WFD; 2	STA; 1	JEN; 23	**NHA**; 1*	BEE; 5	SEE; 17	RIV; 10	STA; 2	TMP; 20	WFD; 6	**MAR**; 1*	TMP; 1	NHA; 1*	STA; 5	TMP; 30											2nd	2731	
2006	Mystique Motorsports	13	Chevy	TMP; 4	STA; 6																											3rd	2247	
2006	Rudy Andrews, Jr.	86	Chevy			JEN; 1																										3rd	2247	
2006	Eddie Whelan	36	Chevy				TMP; 29	STA; 6	NHA; 7*	HOL; 2	RIV; 1	STA; 22	TMP; 1	MAR; 2	TMP; 28	NHA; 6	WFD; 3	TMP; 19*	STA; 25													3rd	2247	
2007	Eddie Whelan	36	Chevy	TMP; 27	STA; 19*	WAL; 4	STA; 28*	TMP; 2	**NHA**; 2	TSA; 5	RIV; 15	STA; 1*	TMP; 8	MAN; 8	MAR; 2	NHA; 25	TMP; 21	STA; 3	TMP; 4													5th	2187	
2008	Eddie Whelan	36	Chevy	TMP; 10	STA; 1*	STA; 3	TMP; 2*	NHA; 2*	SPE; 19	RIV; 4	STA; 28	TMP; 4	MAN; 1**	TMP; 14*	NHA; 1	MAR; 4	CHE; 7	STA; 6	TMP; 1													1st	2441	
2009	Eddie Whelan	36	Chevy	TMP; 1*	STA; 1*	STA; 2	NHA; 5	**SPE**; 10	RIV; 20	**STA**; 2*	**BRI**; 2*	**TMP**; 2*	NHA; 7	MAR; 20	STA; 31	TMP; 1*																3rd	1931	
2010	Eddie Whelan	36	Chevy	TMP; 4	STA; 1	STA; 12	MAR; 18	NHA; 2*	LIM; 5	MND; 1	RIV; 12	STA; 5	TMP; 1*		NHA; 30	STA; 8	TMP; 1															3rd	2102	
2010	Eddie Whelan	13	Chevy											BRI; 18*																		3rd	2102	
2011	Eddie Whelan	36	Chevy	TMP; 1*	STA; 7	STA; 4	MND; 6	**TMP**; 1	NHA; 10	RIV; 17	STA; 1	NHA; 28	BRI	DEL	TMP; 4	LRP; 5	NHA; 4	STA; 1	TMP; 22													9th	2053	
2012	Eddie Whelan	36	Chevy	TMP; 2	STA; 22	MND; 12	STA; 7	**WFD**; 9	NHA; 29																							9th	452	
2012	Joe Brady	00	Chevy							STA; 5																						9th	452	
2012	Jan Boehler	3	Chevy								TMP; 4	BRI; 17	TMP; 5	RIV; 5	NHA; 17	STA; 20																9th	452	
2012	James Ksepka	82	Ford														TMP; 13															9th	452	
2013	Jan Boehler	3	Chevy	TMP; 5	STA; 3	STA; 14	WFD; 23	RIV; 18	NHA; 2*	MND; 11	STA; 3	TMP; 22	BRI; 11	RIV; 8	NHA; 24	STA; 7	TMP; 23															10th	445	
2014	Robert Katon Jr.	13	Chevy	TMP; 8	STA; 6	STA; 8	WFD; 3	RIV; 2	NHA; 3	MND; 8	STA; 7	TMP; 7	BRI; 16	NHA; 4	STA; 2	TMP; 20																5th	480	
2015	Robert Katon Jr.	13	Chevy	TMP; 4	STA; 24	WFD; 3	STA; 6	TMP; 10	RIV; 11	NHA; 31	MND	STA; 4																				13th	414	
2015	Christopher Our	22	Chevy										TMP; 9	BRI; 11	RIV	NHA; 21	STA; 19	TMP; 8														13th	414	
2016	Brian Brady	00	Chevy	TMP	STA; 14	WFD; 14	STA	TMP	RIV	NHA	MND	STA	TMP	BRI	RIV	OSW	SEE	NHA	STA	TMP												34th	61	
2017	Brian Brady	00	Chevy	MYR	TMP	STA; 5	LGY																									19th	303	
2017	Danny Watts Racing	82	Chevy					TMP; 7	RIV; 11	NHA; 7	STA; 26	TMP; 3	BRI; 22	SEE; 15	OSW; 17	RIV^{1} 24	NHA	STA	TMP													19th	303	

^{1} Christopher was killed in a plane crash near the North Branford and Guilford, Connecticut, town line, while en route to Riverhead Raceway. He was officially credited with a "did not start" status and a 24th-place finish.

==== Whelen Southern Modified Tour ====
NASCAR Whelen Southern Modified Tour results
Year	Car owner	No.	Make	1	2	3	4	5	6	7	8	9	10	11	12	13	14	NSWMTC	Pts	Ref
2005	Roger Hill	79	Pontiac	CRW; 1*	CRW	CRW; 10	CRW	BGS	MAR	ACE; 2	ACE; 15	CRW	CRW	SNM	ACE			17th	602	
2006	Joe Brady	80	Chevy	CRW; 1*	GRE	CRW; 4*	DUB; 6	CRW	BGS	MAR	CRW	ACE	CRW	HCY	DUB	SNM		25th	490	
2007	Joe Brady	00	Chevy	CRW; 18	FAI	GRE	CRW	CRW	BGS	MAR	ACE	CRW	SNM	CRW	CRW			42nd	109	
2008	Joe Brady	00	Chevy	CRW; 2	ACE	CRW	BGS	CRW	LAN	CRW	SNM	MAR	CRW	CRW				32nd	170	
2009	Joe Brady	00	Chevy	CON; 1**	SBO	CRW; 1	LAN; 7	CRW	BGS	BRI	CRW	MBS	CRW	CRW	MAR	ACE	CRW	19th	506	
2011	Joe Brady	00	Chevy	CRW; 19	HCY	SBO; 1	CRW; 1*	CRW	BGS	BRI	CRW	LGY	THO	TRI	CRW	CLT	CRW	24th	481	
2012	Roger Hill	79	Pontiac	CRW	CRW	SBO	CRW	CRW	BGS	BRI	LGY	THO	CRW	CLT; 7				39th	37	
2013	Scott Anderson	00	Chevy	CRW; 4	SNM; 6	SBO	CRW	CRW	BGS	BRI	LGY	CRW	CRW	SNM	CLT			23rd	78	
2016	Brian Brady	00	Chevy	CRW	CON; 2	SBO	CRW	CRW	BGS	BRI	ECA	SBO	CRW	CLT				22nd	43	

=== Rolex Sports Car Series ===
(key) (Races in bold indicate pole position, Results are overall/class)

Rolex Sports Car Series results
Year	Team	Make	Engine	Class	1	2	3	4	5	6	7	8	9	10	11	12	13	14	15	Rank	Points	Ref
2006	Brumos Racing	Fabcar	Porsche	DP	DAY (54/18)	MEX	HOM	LBH	VIR	LAG	PHX	LRP	WAT (40/23)	MOH	DAY	BAR	WAT	SON	MIL	126th	13	
2008	Southard Motorsports	Riley	Lexus	DP	DAY (42/17)	HOM	MEX	VIR	LAG	LRP	WAT	MOH	DAY	BAR	CAN	WAT	SON	MIL	UTA	83rd	14	

==== 24 Hours of Daytona ====
24 Hours of Daytona results
Year	Class	No	Team	Car	Co-drivers	Laps	Position	Class Pos.
2006	DP	59	(United States) Brumos Racing	Porsche DP	(Portugal) João Barbosa (United States) J. C. France (United States) Hurley Haywood	559	54	18
2008	DP	3	(United States) Southard Motorsports	Lexus Riley DP	(United States) Shane Lewis (United States) Bill Lester (United States) Alex Barron	527	42	17

Sporting positions
Preceded by Donny Lia	NASCAR Whelen Modified Tour Champion; 2008	Succeeded by Donny Lia
