= Chris Pasteryak =

American racing driver

- Nationality: American
- Born: September 15, 1980 (age 46) Lisbon, Connecticut, U.S.

NASCAR Whelen Modified Tour career
- Debut season: 2005
- Years active: 2005–2007, 2009–2010, 2018–2020
- Starts: 69
- Championships: 0
- Wins: 0
- Poles: 1
- Best finish: 6th in 2009
- Statistics up to date as of August 6, 2024.

Chris Pasteryak (born September 15, 1980) is an American professional stock car racing driver who competed in the NASCAR Whelen Modified Tour from 2005 to 2020. Pasteryak is a second generation driver, following in the footsteps of his father Charlie, and uncle Carl. His career started in Legends cars before moving into the SK Modified Division at his home track of the Waterford Speedbowl in 2003.

Pasteryak has also competed in series such as the SMART Modified Tour, the Tri-Track Open Modified Series, the Modified Racing Series (where he was the 2008 & 2011 series champion), and the World Series of Asphalt Stock Car Racing.

== Motorsports results ==
=== NASCAR ===
(key) (Bold – Pole position awarded by qualifying time. Italics – Pole position earned by points standings or practice time. * – Most laps led.)

==== Whelen Modified Tour ====
NASCAR Whelen Modified Tour results
Year	Car owner	No.	Make	1	2	3	4	5	6	7	8	9	10	11	12	13	14	15	16	17	18	NWMTC	Pts	Ref
2005	Margrette Pasteryak	5	Chevy	TMP	STA	RIV	WFD; 20	STA	JEN	NHA	BEE	SEE	RIV	STA; 15	TMP; 29	WFD; 10	MAR	TMP	NHA	STA	TMP	42nd	431	
2006	Margrette Pasteryak	5	Chevy	TMP	STA; 24	JEN	TMP; 30	STA	NHA	HOL	RIV	STA; 3	TMP; 12	MAR	TMP; 13	NHA; 23	WFD; 6	TMP; 8	STA; DNQ			29th	1140	
2006	Rose Pasteryak	75	Pontiac																STA; 15			29th	1140	
2007	Margrette Pasteryak	5	Chevy	TMP; DNQ	STA; DNQ	WTO	STA; DNQ	TMP; DNQ	NHA	TSA	RIV	STA	TMP	MAN	MAR	NHA	TMP	STA	TMP			55th	150	
2009	Wayne Darling	52	Chevy	TMP; 33	STA; 5	STA; 6	NHA; 25	SPE; 14	RIV; 9	STA; 3	BRI; 12	TMP; 13	NHA; 12	MAR; 12*	STA; 5	TMP; 6						6th	1691	
2010	Wayne Darling	52	Chevy	TMP; 7	STA; 16	STA; 30	MAR; 22	NHA	LIM	MND	RIV	STA	TMP	BRI	NHA	STA	TMP					37th	431	
2018	Charles Pasteryak	75	Chevy	MYR; 18	TMP; 11	STA; 18	SEE; 15	TMP; 13	LGY; 9	RIV; 11	NHA	STA; 10	TMP; 9	BRI	OSW; 25	RIV; 9	NHA; 20	STA; 8	TMP; 9			10th	431	
2019	Charles Pasteryak	75	Chevy	MYR; 5	SBO; 6	TMP; 9	STA; 26	WAL; 18	SEE; 6	TMP; 12	RIV; 12	NHA; 21	STA; 11	TMP; 12	OSW; 12	RIV; 22	NHA; 8	**STA**; 11	TMP; 32			9th	483	
2020	Charles Pasteryak	75	Chevy	JEN; 12	WMM; 7	WMM; 20	JEN; 10	MND; 20	TMP; 4	NHA; 13	STA; 16	TMP; 13										11th	282	

=== SMART Modified Tour ===
SMART Modified Tour results
Year	Car owner	No.	Make	1	2	3	4	5	6	7	8	9	10	11	12	13	14	SMTC	Pts	Ref
2024	Charlie Pasteryak	5CT	N/A	FLO	CRW	SBO; DNS	TRI	ROU										46th	34	
2024	Gary Putnam	77	N/A						HCY; 16	FCS	CRW	JAC	CAR	CRW	DOM	SBO	NWS	46th	34	
2025	Charlie Pasteryak	5CT	N/A	FLO; 12	AND	SBO; 12	ROU	HCY	FCS	CRW	CPS	CAR	CRW	DOM	FCS	TRI	NWS	35th	58	
2026	Charlie Pasteryak	5CT	N/A	FLO; 8	AND	SBO; 10	DOM	HCY	WKS	FCR	CRW	PUL	CAR	ROU	TRI	NWS		36th	64	
