= Waterford Speedbowl =

Oval race track in Waterford, Connecticut

New London-Waterford Speedbowl
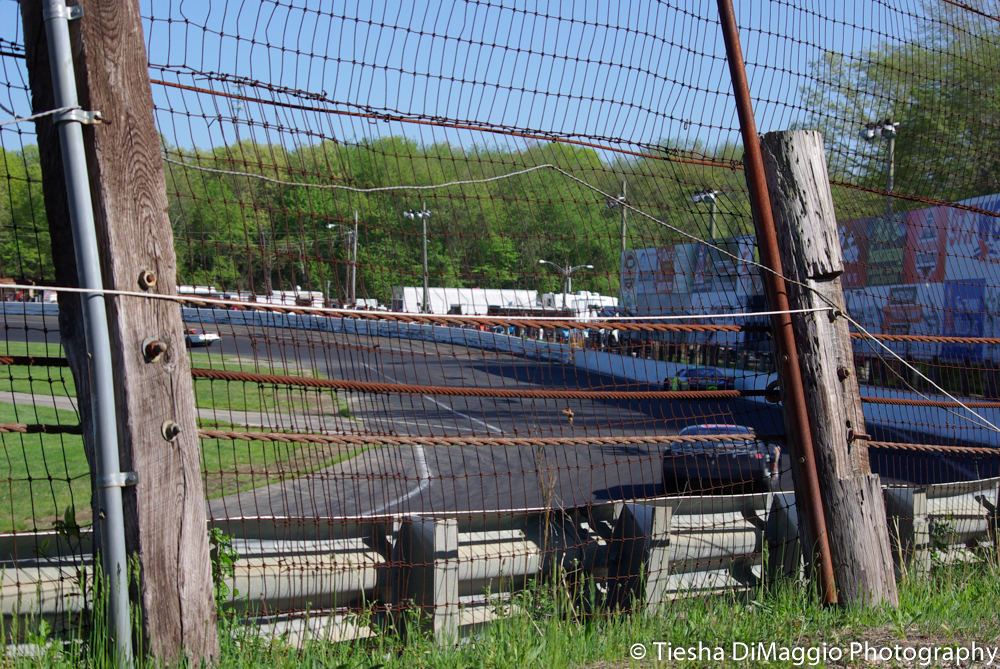
- Location: 1080 Hartford Turnpike; Waterford, Connecticut, 06385
- Coordinates: 41°14′05″N 72°06′12″W
- Opened: April 15, 1951
- Former names: Waterford Speedbowl (1980s–2014); The New Waterford Speedbowl (2007–08)
- Surface: Crushed blue stone (April 15, 1951 – May 18, 1951), asphalt (May 19, 1951 – present)
- Length: 0.375 mi (0.604 km)
- Turns: 4
- Banking: 10°

The New London-Waterford Speedbowl is a 3/8 mile asphalt oval race track located on CT 85 in Waterford, Connecticut, just off Interstate 395. It first opened for business on April 15, 1951, as "The New London-Waterford Speed Bowl", the track has been in continuous operation every season since it initially opened. It has continuously promoted Modified stock car racing as its featured division since its first year of operation. It also holds family-oriented events such as the Wild N' Wacky Wednesday Series, Friday Show & Go drag racing and several Sunday Spectacular events throughout the year. Glastonbury businessman Bruce Bemer, won the track property via foreclosure auction bid in October 2014 after several seasons of financial struggles under former owner Terry Eames.

== History ==
=== Original ownership group ===
The New London-Waterford Speedbowl opened on April 15, 1951, as a 1/3 mile crushed blue stone oval race track. Its ownership group, The New London-Waterford Speedbowl, Inc., was composed of local businessmen: brothers Fred and Frank Benvenuti, Anthony Albino, Conrad Nassetta, William Hoffner and J. Lawrence Peters. John Whitehouse was the track's first Race Director, a position he held through most of the original ownership group's tenure into the early 1970s. Whitehouse lived in Florida during the winter and would then move up north and stay in a house on the Speedbowl property during the racing season. The Speedbowl featured Modified stock car racing, called Sportsmen Stock cars at the time. The first event winner was Bob Swift. After 3 weeks of operation, the dust created during green flag segments of racing became a nuisance to spectators. The track closed for about a month and re-opened as an asphalt oval, which it remains today.

The one and only fatality as a result of injuries from an incident during a race occurred on August 1, 1954, when Jack Griffin's car flipped end-over-end approximately 10 times down the straightaway. The 41-year-old was transported to the local hospital but was pronounced dead shortly after 1am the following morning. His style of racecar, known as a "cut-down", was banned from the Speedbowl shortly thereafter for being too unsafe for competition. In the coming years, the cut-downs were eventually banned throughout the northeast.

Through the 1961 season, the track held events twice a week, on Saturdays and Wednesdays, featuring the same divisions, meaning each division ran twice a week earning points towards the championship. Since the 1962, the Speedbowl's primary weekly divisions have raced once a week on Saturdays (although separate divisions and events have since been created over the years and compete exclusively on other days of the week)

The operating Board of Directors had some turnover through the years. By 1960, Anthony Albino (now President) and Frank Benvenuti (vice-president) were the only original owners still part of New London-Waterford Speedbowl, Inc. About a year later, local businessmen Jack Brouwer and Lou Esposito bought into the track as minority owners. By the early 1970s, the track ownership group consisted of Brouwer, Esposito and 2nd generation members Don Benvenuti and Bob Albino (who was the majority owner). Internal conflict would lead to the group selling the track after the 1974 season, after a 24-year run operating as The New-London Waterford Speedbowl Inc.

The first Modified Champion at the Speedbowl was NEAR Hall of Famer Dave Humphrey, who also won the same title at the Seekonk Speedway that year, and would later win multiple titles in the Northeastern Midget Association (NEMA) later in his career. Other big stars during the track's early days were 2-time Champion Bill Slater, 5-time Champion Don Collins, 4-time Champion Charlie Webster, Moe Gherzi, Melvin "Red" Foote, Newt Palm and Ted Stack.

=== Harvey Tattersall Jr. buys Speedbowl ===
Prior to the 1975 season, Harvey Tattersall Jr., long-time president of the United Stock Car Racing Association and one-time operator of the Riverside Park Speedway (among other tracks) bought the track from the previous ownership group. Tattersall had been one of the premiere racing promoters in the Northeast for two decades. His ownership tenure saw him as promoter and Race Director in the first few years, then he leased the track out for most of the later years.

Tattersall revamped the structure of the supporting Late Model division when he took over in 1975, which was now called the Grand Americans. During his reign, Tattersall would lease the track to Dick Williams on two occasions. First in 1978, only for Tattersall take promoter duties back the following year, and then again in the early 1980s when Williams was actually operating four tracks at once, until focusing solely on the Waterford Speedbowl by the 1983 season Both Tattersall and Williams served as both the promoter and Race Director during their respective operational control of the track.

In 1983, legendary modified driver Ed Flemke became the Chief Steward at the Speedbowl, working with Dick Williams. It was the last position in auto racing that Flemke held. He died during the following off-season. His position at the Speedbowl was not replaced.

One of the more star-studded events during this time was the Yankee All-Star League events that ran at the track from 1975 to 1978. Winners of these events at Waterford included future NASCAR Sprint Cup Series stars Geoff Bodine, Ron Bouchard and Ken Bouchard, NASCAR National Modified Champions Carl "Bugsy" Stevens and Fred DeSarro and legendary Long Island, NY Modified driver Charlie Jarzombek. NASCAR Hall of Famer Richie Evans competed in these events and a few others at the Speedbowl during his career before his death in 1985. The Waterford Speedbowl, however, is one of the few tracks that Evans raced at without ever recording a victory. The NASCAR Stroh's Late Model tour, run by Tom Curley, made two appearances at the track in 1982 & 1983. Dave Dion won both events.

Stars on the track during this time were 4-time Modified Champion Dick Dunn, Bob Potter, George "Moose" Hewitt and Late Models racers Don Fowler, Bob Gada and Ron Cote among others.

=== Arute's 7A Productions ===
By the end of the 1984 season, the track was enduring a tough time. The 1984 season was the only season which didn't have an end of the year banquet to celebrate its champions. But prior to the 1985 season, Tattersall leased the Speedbowl to the Arute family, who owned and operated the Stafford Motor Speedway in Stafford Springs. Two significant changes came during their reign as track operators: The headlining division was changed from the Modified division, to the upstart SK Modified division (at the time, the SK's were designed as a low-budget alternative to modified racing) and they also brought the NASCAR sanction to the track for the first time. The first SK Modified Champion at Waterford was future NASCAR Whelen Modified Tour Champion Rick Fuller, driving the Ted Marsh #55 car in 198 The Arutes leased the track for 3 seasons, before leaving to once again focus solely on their family owned track in Stafford.

Another star who blossomed during the mid-1980s was Late Model driver Phil Rondeau of Baltic, Connecticut. He won a record 6 Late Model Championships in an 8-year span (1985, 1987–89, 1991–92) and recorded over 100 victories during his career that lasted into the early 2000s at the track. Rondeau was considered one of the top short track Late Model drivers in the Northeast during his time at Waterford. Other stars on the track in the 1980s included C.J. Frye and Brian McCarthy in the Late Model division and Rick Donnelly, Bob Potter, George "Moose" Hewitt and Dick Ceravolo in the Modifieds. Potter won 6 Championship between the Modified and SK Modified divisions in the 1970s & 1980's. Hewitt was a 5-time Modified Champion.

=== Korteweg's K Corporation ===
In 1988, the Korteweg family took over track operations. Headed by father George and his sons Dan and Wayne, the Kortewegs invested a lot into track renovations, including the only repaving of the track's racing surface, new steel Armco barrier around the track, new catch fence and renovated restrooms and concession stands. A 3rd division was created in 1988 to support the SK Modified and Late Model divisions, called the Strictly Stocks - an entry level division of 8-cylinder stock cars. This division proved to be wildly popular.

The early 1990s brought some hurdles for the Korteweg family. Local residents complained in numbers about the noise the facility generated during its events. The track made it mandatory for all race cars to have mufflers in 1991. The town of Waterford did implement a noise ordinance in August 1993, but it excluded racing at the Speedbowl. During July 1991, the Speedbowl was endanger of closing its doors for one of its big events on July 4 weekend, when then-Connecticut Governor Lowell Weicker cut the state budget for non-essential jobs, including the DMV officials who regulated race events at all Connecticut tracks. Less than 48 hours before the event, the state allowed DMV officials to the Speedbowl, however they would now be paid by the track directly. Connecticut's DMV would no longer have any governing power over the events at the Speedbowl, which remains the case today.

Throughout the 90's, more divisions were created. In 1995, the Mini Stock division (a former enduro-type division that ran on Sundays) was revamped as the 4-cylinder alternative to the Strictly Stock class. Legends car racing, truck divisions and several other enduro-type divisions were also run on Sundays and then Thursdays throughout the decade.

Stars on the track during the 90's included Jerry Pearl, Dave Gada, Todd Ceravolo and future NASCAR Whelen Modified Tour Champion Ted Christopher in the SK Modified division; Phil Rondeau, Jay Stuart, Tom Fox and future K&N Pro Series East Champion Matt Kobyluck in the Late Model division; Glen Boss, Ed Reed Jr., Ken Cassidy and Chris "Moose" Douton in the Strictly Stock division; Jeff Miller, Dan Darnstaedt and Bruce Thomas in the Mini Stock division.

=== Terry Eames buys Speedbowl ===
In 2000, Terry Eames, who was the Speedbowl's promoter since the Korteweg's left the track in the mid-90s, became owner/operator and secured the return of the NASCAR sanction which had been removed in the late 1980s. In 2001, the Wild N' Wacky Wednesday series debuted featuring the Legends Cars as the headlining division along with enduro-type cars called Super X (8-cylinder) and X-cars (4-cylinder) for a weekly summer series that is largely family oriented and still popular to this day. It was around this time that the track was remeasured per NASCAR guidelines and officially declared a 0.375 (3/8) mile oval after a half-century of being recognized as a 0.333 (1/3) mile track.

The dominant driver in the SK Modifieds during this time was Dennis Gada, who won a record 5 straight Championships from 1999 to 2003 including the NASCAR Dodge Weekly Racing Series Northeast Regional title in 2003. Gada's 62 career SK wins at the track is also a record. During the early part of the decade the NASCAR Whelen Modified Tour and NASCAR Busch North/East Series visited the track annually.

However, by the mid-2000s the track was falling on hard times. In 2006, Washington Mutual Bank initiated foreclosure proceedings against Eames. A year later, in late July 2007, a foreclosure auction was avoided when Connecticut businessmen Rocky Arbitell and Peter Borelli bought the note and refinanced with Eames directly. Washington Mutual Bank was now removed from the picture. Eames continued as owner, but leased operational control of the track to Jerry Robinson of Mystic, Connecticut, for the 2007–08 seasons. Around this time, Harvey Industries bought 8 of the 39 acres from Eames and built a distribution center in what was the north end of the parking lot.

Stars during the first decade of the 2000s included: Dennis Gada, Jeff Pearl, Ron Yuhas Jr. and Rob Janovic Jr. in the SK Modifieds; Allen Coates, Corey Hutchings, Bruce Thomas Jr. and Tim Jordan in the Late Models Ed Gertsch Jr., Dwayne Dorr, Walt Hovey Jr. and Al Stone III in the Street Stocks; Danny Field, Phil Evans and Ken Cassidy Jr. in the Mini Stocks. Regional Modified/SK Modified drivers who started out in the Speedbowl's Legends Car division during this time include James Civali, Chris Pasteryak, Mark Bakaj and Jeffrey Paul.

=== New board of directors era ===
In 2009, Terry Eames took back operational control of the track when Robinson's lease was not renewed. Now the promoter once again, Eames formed a new board of directors which included former competitor and 2-time Speedbowl Champion Tom Fox as Race Director, former Mini Stock competitor Mark Caise and local supporter Brian Darling. The original group also featured former Street Stock Champion Shawn Monahan as a joint operator of the track and track historian Tom "Sid" DiMaggio in a multimedia capacity. However, by February 2009, Shawn Monahan resigned from his post sighting differences in the operational agreement with Eames and returned to racing shortly thereafter. DiMaggio resigned 3 days later, although he continues as the track's active historian and part of the track's social media presence via his production company's video work. Fox would resign as Race Director after the 2010 season and Scott Tapley was named as his replacement at the 2010 awards banquet ceremony in January 2011. Shortly after the 2012 season ended, Tapley then resigned to take the Race Director position with the Valenti Modified Racing Series. Track owner & promoter Terry Eames took over the Race Director duties for the 2013 season, the first promoter to do so since Dick Williams in 1984. Former X-Car Champion Patrick Williams took over Race Director duties in 2014. In addition to the turnover with officials, the foreclosure issues were dragged out in the courts, with each season since 2006 ending with a cloud of doubt towards the facility's long-term future.

The Speedbowl's current divisions are SK Modifieds, Late Models, SK Lights, Street Stocks and Mini Stocks. Legend Cars also compete sporadically throughout the Saturday season. The Wild N' Wacky Wednesday series continues to be a successful mid-week series during the summer that features Legends Cars and Bandoleros (for drivers as young as 6-years old), Super-X cars and X-cars and various "wacky" races throughout their season.

Throughout the 2010s. touring divisions that visited the track each year included the ISMA Super Modifieds, the Valenti Modified Racing Series, the NEMA Midgets, the Northeast Trucks Series (NETS) and the Pro4 Modifieds.

Keith Rocco, who also competed at the Stafford Motor Speedway and Thompson International Speedway, clinched the NASCAR Whelen All-American Series National Championship at the Speedbowl on August 14, 2010. He became the first driver to win a NASCAR National Championship while an active weekly competitor at the Waterford Speedbowl. In 2012, the Speedbowl was the hometrack to three National Champions: Ken Cassidy Jr., who won his 4th Mini Stock Championship with a record 12-win season, also won the NASCAR Division III (Asphalt) National Championship. Wednesday Legends Champion Dave Garbo Jr. was the INEX Legends Car Semi-Pro (Asphalt) National Championship. Matt Pappa, of NY, who won 11 times at the Speedbowl in 2012, won the INEX Legends Car Pro (Asphalt) National Championship. In 2013, Keith Rocco became the first driver to win 2 track championships in 2 different divisions when he won both the SK Modified & Late Models titles. He then did it again in 2014, 2016 and 2017. By 2018, Rocco had 12 Speedbowl Championships: 7 in the SK Modifieds (2010-2011, 2013–17), 4 in the Late Models (2013-2014, 2016–2017) and 1 in the Street Stocks (2004).

=== New owner Bruce Bemer ===
On October 18, 2014, a foreclosure auction was held on the Speedbowl property. It was held on the same date as the annual 'Smacktoberfest' event which closes the racing season. There were approximately 100 people in attendance, with four registered bidders. The winning bid of $1.75 million came from Glastonbury, Connecticut, businessman Bruce Bemer, whose group immediately announced they intended to keep it a racetrack. However, the total debt that brought about the foreclosure auction was over $2 million, meaning not all the creditors owed money would be paid. One creditor, Ed DeMuzzio, filed motions (including a motion to reconsider and an appeal) in hopes to recoup some of his money. After months of negotiations between all parties involved, in early February 2015, a resolution was reached, the appeal was withdrawn and the sale was finally approved by the courts.

Shortly afterward, Shawn Monahan was named as the new GM of the Speedbowl – six years after his first opportunity in a similar role with Terry Eames. Scott Tapley was also announced as the new Race Director. One of their earliest announcements was a change back to the track's original name, "The New London-Waterford Speedbowl".

In 2017 Bruce Bemer was arrested for participating a sex ring and human trafficking. NASCAR pulled its sanction for the track's weekly Saturday divisions shortly afterward. INEX pulled its sanction for the US Legend Cars and Bandolero divisions as well. The track wasn't going to open but in 2017 but a lease deal was worked out to open the track with George Whitney managing the day-to-day of the track. Whitney operated the track until September 2018, when he terminated his lease with Bemer with 4 weeks left in the season. Mike Serluca leased the track for the remainder of the 2018 season.

The track's main wooden grandstand which was originally built in 1951 and patch-repaired numerous times over the years, was required to be replaced by the Town of Waterford and were dismantled after the 2018 season. The track did not open for numerous reasons in 2019, including new grandstands yet to be installed. Mike Serluca resigned as GM in July 2020, shortly before a new operating team announced plans to open by August 2020. On September 29, 2021 the Connecticut Supreme Court overturned Bruce Bemer's conviction of patronizing a trafficked person and accessory to human trafficking.

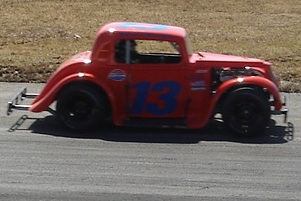
Brian Ouimette at the Waterford Speedbowl.

== In media ==
- New York DJ, producer and radio host Funkmaster Flex wanted to explore his passion for car racing and developed a unique way to get it done with a new Spike TV show race event called The Funkmaster Flex Super Series Invitational. The race featured 60 hungry late model stock car drivers from across the country turning laps at the Waterford Speedbowl. Flex went behind the scene to see what it takes to become a winner in racing while bringing out celebrities like Orange County Choppers, who paced the field before the start of the race on their choppers, Lil' Kim who wove the initial green flag as the honorary starter and LL Cool J, who gave a short performance to the crowd after the event. You can view the YouTube link of the show's opening sequence on "Monica Taylor Enterprise - Rare Footage of Super Series" The event was held on Thursday August 5, 2004. Among those who were invited to qualify for the event included current NASCAR Whelen Modified Tour competitors Ted Christopher, Doug Coby and Woody Pitkat. During the late stages of the race, 6-time Speedbowl Late Model Champion Phil Rondeau was called for spinning race leader Ted Christopher with less than 20 laps to go. 3-time Speedbowl LM Champ Allen Coates inherited the lead and held off Woody Pitkat over the final laps to take the win. Coates won $10,000 and a vintage 1969 Camaro for his victory. Pitkat took home $6,000 for second and Rondeau $4,000 for third. The event was billed as having $100,000 in total purse and awards. The crowd was estimated at around 8,000 people, making it one of the most attended events in the history of the facility. Although there were early discussions for this to be a yearly event, Funkmaster Flex never returned to the Speedbowl to continue the series.
- In the summer of 2005, NESN debuted a series called "Inside Line" that was a reality based show focusing on local racing in the Northeast. Ted Christopher, one of the premier Modified drivers and former SK Modified Champion at the Speedbowl was one of the people profiled in an early episode of the short-lived series. Much of the raceday footage used was shot at the Speedbowl on June 25, 2005, when Christopher competed in both the weekly SK Modified 35 lap event and the NASCAR Whelen Modified Tour 150 event. His twin brother Mike, engine builder Mike Pettit, and fellow competitors Doug Coby, Chris Pasteryak and the late Jay Miller were some of the people who had appearances in the episode as well.
- The Speedbowl was highlighted on the Discovery Channel network's show Destroyed in Seconds. Originally airing on February 16, 2009, a segment of the show was dedicated to a wreck during a Late Model event held a few years earlier on Saturday July 8, 2006. Jay Lozyniak's #28 car barrell-rolled down the front straightaway during a multi-car wreck in turn 4. Most of the footage shown was recorded by Jay's mother in the stands while it happened. Jay, and all other drivers involved that night, were not seriously injured. The race was red-checkered after only 18 of the 30 laps were completed. Only five cars were able to continue after the incident. Glenn Colvin, who was the highest positioned car not involved in the wreck, was declared the winner.
- The 2011 film 3 Weeks to Daytona, written & directed by Fairfield, CT native Bret Stern, was shot in several locations throughout the state, including the Waterford Speedbowl. In an interview with the website indieWire, Stern stated "I was inspired to make the film after watching cars race at the Speedbowl in Waterford, Connecticut. I'd go Saturday night to see races. Sitting in the stands, watching the guys driving the cars all night, possibly wrecking them, and then scrambling together to get them ready to race the next time." The film starred Scott Cohen as a local short track racer getting a shot to compete in the Daytona 500. It also starred Jorja Fox and Rip Torn.
- In 2014, Waterford Speedbowl SK Modified rookie and 2012 Legend Car Champion Paul Kusheba IV was finalist for the PEAK Stock Car Dream Challenge. The contest promoted a chance to compete in a NASCAR K&N Pro Series event. The competition was filmed as a mini-series shown on the Velocity channel (now Motor Trend (TV network) that premiered on August 2, 2014.
- From 2010 to 2016, track historian Tom "Sid" DiMaggio of Vault Productions produced a weekly web series of the events called "Sid's View". The series was produced primarily from a fan's (Sid's) point of view and featured coverage via multiple cameras around the facility and on board numerous cars. The series won "Best Social Media" for Sid's View in 2013 on Speed51.com's annual 51's honoring short tracks around the country in various categories and determined via fan vote.
- Vault Productions also produced a 6-part documentary series on the history of the track from its initial construction to surviving the foreclosure auction in 2014. Part 1 (1951-1961) was released online in August 2015, Part 2 (1961-1974) was released in January 2016, Part 3 (1975-1984) in March 2017, Part 4 (1985-1994) in October 2018 and Part 5 (1995-2004) in November 2019. Part 6 (2005-2014) is in production with a tentatively Nov 2020 release date.

== 2021 track champions ==
- Todd Owen - SK Modifieds
- Jason Palmer - Late Models
- Doug Curry - Street Stock
- Tom Silva - Mini Stocks
- Paul Charette - SK Light Modifieds
- John O'Sullivan - Legend Cars (Sat)
- Jacob Burns - Legend Cars (Wed)
- Chuck McDonald - X-cars (Wed)
- Eddie Ryan Jr. - Super X-cars (Wed)
- Joel Newcomb - Bandoleros (Wed)
