= Shangri-La Speedway =

Defunct motorsport venue in Owego, Nee York

- TIOGA Motorsports Park 1991–2005
- Location: Owego, New York
- Coordinates: 42.0933°N 76.2828°W
- Opened: 1946
- Closed: 2005
- Former names: Tioga Motorsports Park; Shangri-La Motor Speedway

Oval
- Surface: Asphalt
- Length: .8 km (0.50 mi)
- Turns: 4

Dragway
- Length: .2 km (0.12 mi)

Inner Oval
- Length: .16 km (0.099 mi)

Shangri-La Speedway was a half-mile (0.8 km) oval race track in Owego, New York. The facility also included an eighth-mile (0.2 km) drag strip and a tenth-mile oval track for microds (a type of wooden-bodied go-kart raced in many clubs in upstate New York). Its formal name was changed to Shangri-La Motor Speedway (in use from 1979 to 1991) and to Tioga Motorsports Park (in use from 1992 to 2005), but most racers and fans still referred to it as "Shangri-La".

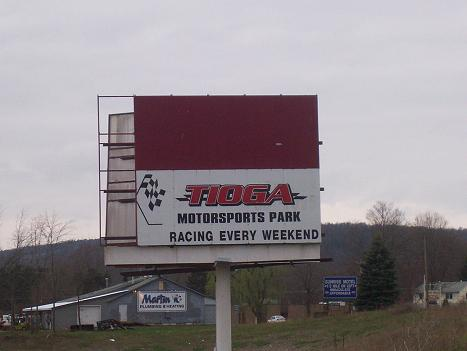
Tioga Motorsports Park/Shangri-La former sign.

== Overview ==
Over a span of fifty years, Shangri-La hosted automobile races of various kinds, AAA Championship Cars, stock cars, Modifieds, Supermodifieds, and supporting classes. Shangri-La's weekly racing was widely considered among the best in the sport during several different periods, including years when nine-time NASCAR National Modified Champion Richie Evans and six-time NASCAR National Modified Champion Jerry Cook were regulars.

The speedway hosted one NASCAR Cup Series event in 1952 and the race was won by Tim Flock.

In August 1991, longtime NASCAR independent driver J.D. McDuffie won a celebrity race at the track. This occurred just one day prior to his fatal racing accident in the Bud at the Glen at Watkins Glen International.

== Track history ==
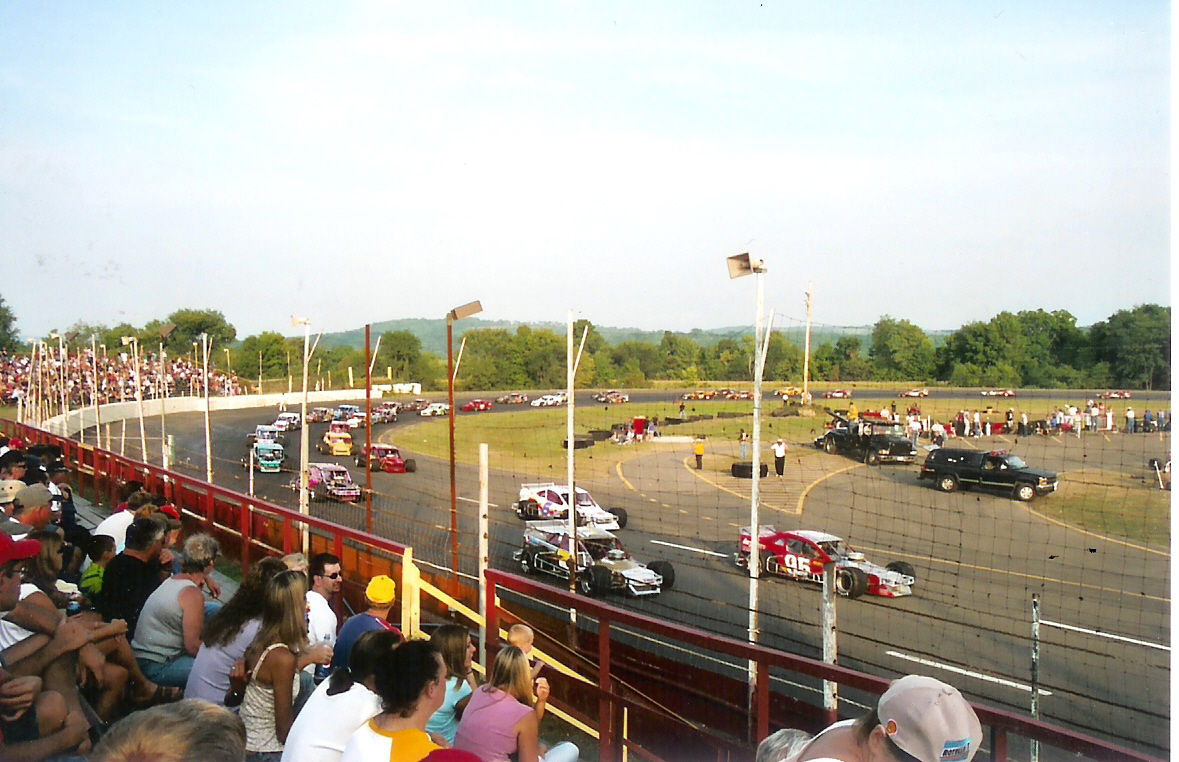
Final race held at Shangri-La Speedway in 2005.

Shangri-La Speedway was opened in 1946 by Bill Owen, who planned and built the track with help of family members. It was closed in 1956 due to neglect and small crowds but then briefly re-opened in 1959 by a group of area drag racers; after a few events it closed in the same year. It was again re-opened in 1962 by Fran Gitchell and operated by the Zacharias family from 2002 until 2005 when it was shut down to allow gravel mining from the property. Nothing remains of the track itself, and the grandstands and buildings were demolished.

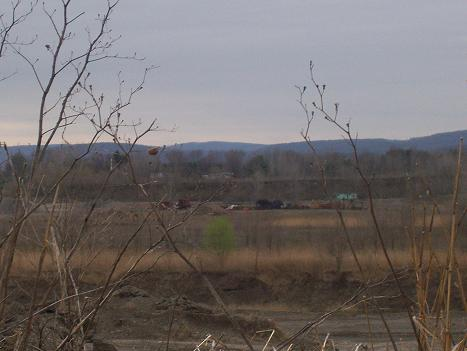
Shangri-La Speedway remains after demolition in 2007.

A replacement track in nearby Tioga Center, known as Shangri-La II Speedway, opened in 2009.

== Weekly featured division and sanctioning body ==
- 1946–48: ESRA (Eastern States Racing Association) Sprints
- 1949: ESRA Sprints and unsanctioned Stock Cars
- 1950–56: unsanctioned Stock Cars
- 1959: NASCAR drag racing
- 1962–64: unsanctioned Supermodifieds and Modifieds
- 1965–72: unsanctioned Modifieds
- 1973–75: NASCAR National Modified
- 1976–78: NEARA (Northeast Auto Racing Association) Modifieds
- 1979–2000: NASCAR National Modified
- 2001–2005: unsanctioned Modifieds

== Visits by major touring series ==
- 1946–48: AAA Championship Cars, AAA Sprint Cars
- 1952: NASCAR Grand National Series
- 1970: All-Star Racing League
- 1979–91: ISMA (International SuperModified Association) Supermodifieds
- 1987–88: American Indycar Series
- 1987–88, 1995–97: NASCAR Busch North Series
- 1985–89, 1994: NASCAR Whelen Modified Tour

== Track regulars who went on to Cup racing ==
- Geoff Bodine
- Brett Bodine
- Greg Sacks
- Jimmy Spencer
