= New Egypt Speedway =

Clay race track

Coordinates: 40°4′14.77″N 74°28′4.23″W

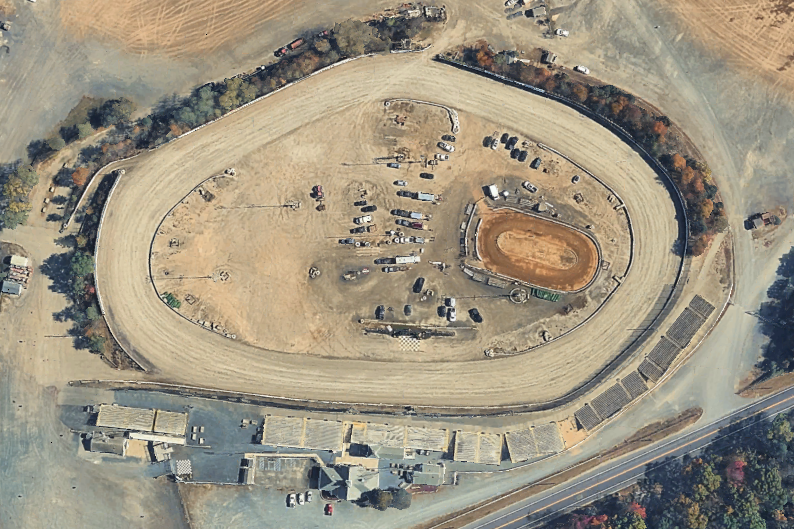
New Egypt Speedway in 2026

New Egypt Speedway was a 7/16 mile clay race track in New Egypt, New Jersey. The track hosted the NASCAR Whelen Modified Tour on a quarter mile asphalt track in the 1980s.

== History ==
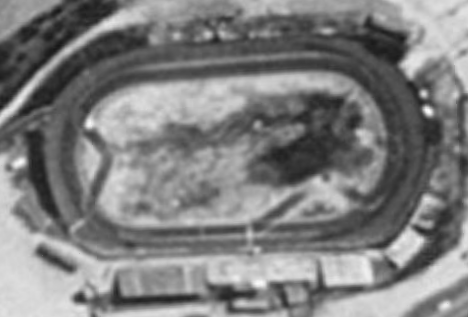
New Egypt Speedway back when it was an asphalt oval

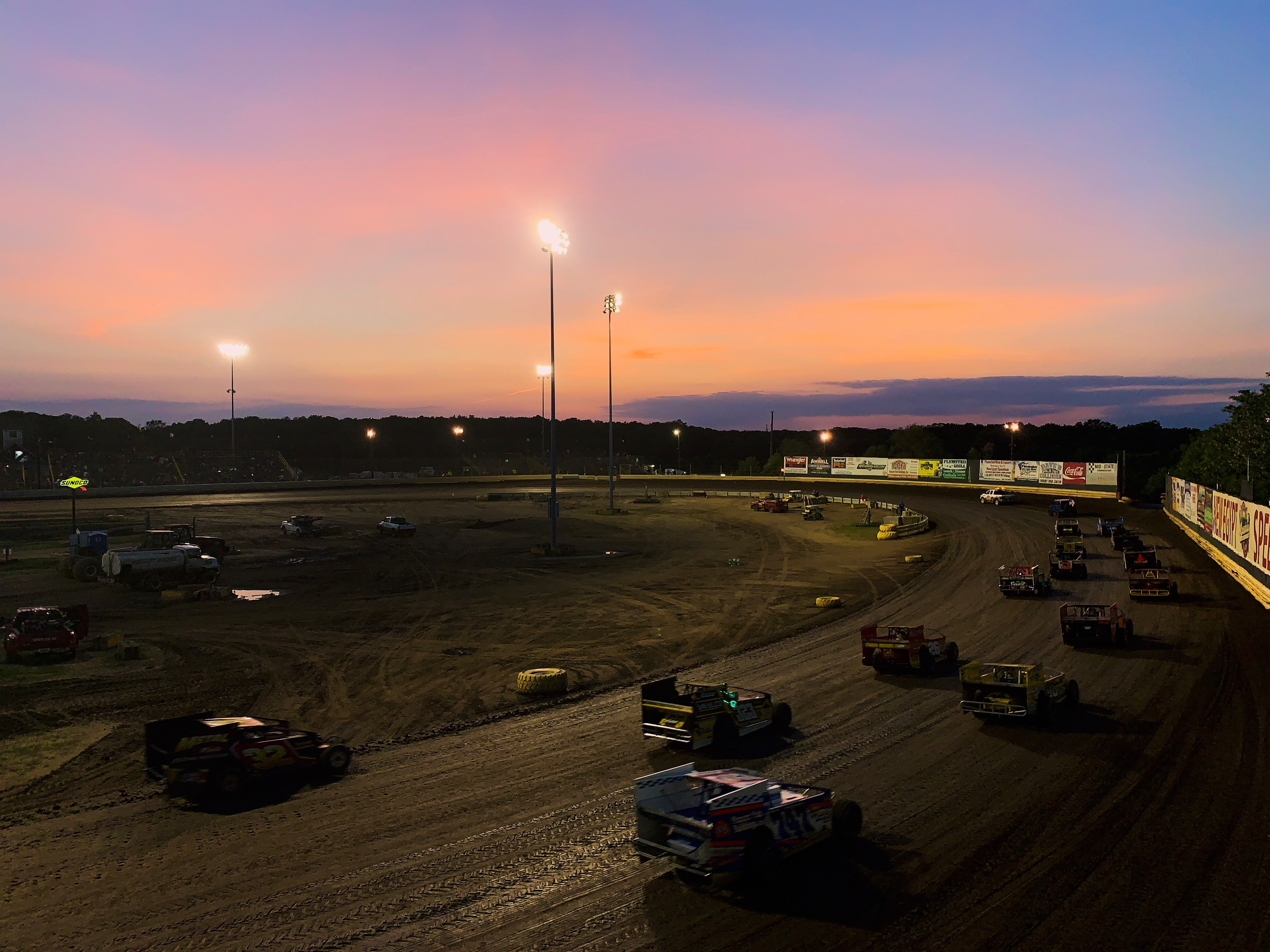
New Egypt Speedway in May 2019

The track was built in 1946 as a 1/4 mile dirt track, before being converted to a paved race track during the 1960s, through the early 1990s when the track was abandoned.

The speedway was about to be torn down until the Grosso family purchased it in 1997. Until this point the speedway had steadily deteriorated from bad to worse. Originally pavement, the new NES brought dirt track racing back to Ocean County, New Jersey. With a complete track makeover, motorsports promoters from all 50 states named the speedway "Most Outstanding Rehabilitation of a Speedway," putting the central New Jersey track in the national spotlight during Daytona Speedweeks. The Grossos leveled the existing facility and replaced it with a 1/3-mile dirt track.

In 2006, New Egypt Speedway was purchased by Bill Miscoski and Fred Vahlsing. Under Miscoski and Vahlsing’s guidance, in 2009, the Speedway was widened to the current configuration 7/16-mile D-shaped clay oval.

In July 2022, The speedway went under new management.

In December 2025, it was announced the speedway would close for 2026 due to no new ownership, as former-owner Fred Vahlsing did not return as owner for 2026, hoping to find new owners to keep racing going there. But in August 2026, the track was sold to a non-racing buyer for industrial use, with demolition beginning in October.

== Events ==
New Egypt Speedway hosted races on Saturday nights from April to October. The speedway drew over 60 race cars on a weekly basis. Additionally, it occasionally hosted weekly high-profile specials. Along with World of Outlaw Sprint cars, It has hosted World of Outlaws late model races in the past.

The NASCAR Whelen Modified Tour had 6 events at the speedway, between 1985 and 1986 in the former 1/4 mile paved track.

== Notable drivers ==
New Egypt has been home to many drivers over the years, including Martin Truex Jr., Ray Evernham, Kenny Brightbill, Stewart Friesen, and local legend Billy Pauch.
