= Riverside Park Speedway =

Defunct race track

Coordinates: 42°2′17.7″N 72°36′42.96″W

Riverside Park Speedway was originally a 1/5-mile flat turn paved oval and sometime in the late '60s changed to a slightly banked turn 1/4-mile oval paved race track, located at the present site of Six Flags New England in Agawam, Massachusetts, one mile north of the Massachusetts–Connecticut state line.

To capitalize on the nation's new attraction to auto racing following World War II, park owner Edward J. Carroll demolished the dance hall that had burned down in 1948. In its place laid out a flat 1/5-mile oval track, pit area and grandstand alongside the Connecticut River. The first full season of "modified" stock car racing was 1949.

The track closed at the end of the 1999 season. Five-time track champion Bob Polverari won the final race, after which participants started digging up pieces of the track asphalt for souvenirs. In 2000 when the park re-opened as Six Flags New England, the race track was demolished and the DC Universe themed area (including the roller coaster Superman The Ride) was built in its place.
