= 2017 International Supermodified Association =

The 2017 International Supermodified Association was the 41st season of the International Supermodified Association. The series began with the Jack Murphy Memorial at Oswego Speedway on May 27, and ended with the World Series of Speedway Racing at Thompson Speedway Motorsports Park on October 15. Dave Shullick Jr. was the defending champion.

No.	Date	Race title	Track	Winning driver
1	May 27	Jack Murphy Memorial	Oswego Speedway	Chris Perley
2	June 3		Lancaster National Speedway	Trent Stephens
3	June 23	17th Annual Summer Blast-Off	Stafford Motor Speedway	Ben Seitz
4	July 15		Jennerstown Speedway Complex	Jonathan McKennedy
5	July 28	Hy-Miler Nationals Fast 40	Sandusky Speedway	Moe Lilje
6	July 29	Hy-Miler Nationals	Sandusky Speedway	Mike Ordway Jr.
7	August 11	Ollie Silva Memorial	Lee USA Speedway	Michael Muldoon
8	August 12		New London-Waterford Speedbowl	Tim Jedrezejek
9	August 19	Harvey Lennox Series	Delaware Speedway	Mark Sammut
10	September 2	ISMA Super Nationals	Oswego Speedway	Mike Lichty
11	September 9	Star Classic	Star Speedway	Dave Shullick Jr.
12	October 15	World Series of Speedway Racing	Thompson Speedway Motorsports Park	Dave Shullick Jr.
