= 2016 International Supermodified Association =

The 2016 International Supermodified Association was the 40th season of the International Supermodified Association. The series began with the Jack Murphy Memorial at Oswego Speedway on May 28, and ended with the World Series of Racing at Thompson Speedway Motorsports Park on October 16. Dave Shullick Jr. was the defending champion.

No.	Date	Race title	Track	Winning driver
1	May 28	Jack Murphy Memorial	Oswego Speedway	Mike Lichty
2	June 3	Harvey Lennox Memorial	Delaware Speedway	Dave Shullick Jr.
3	June 24	ISMA Summercade	Lorain County Speedway	Mike McVetta
4	June 25	ISMA Summercade	Lorain County Speedway	Mike Ordway Jr.
5	July 9	King of Wings VIII	Oswego Speedway	Trent Stephens
6	July 16		Jennerstown Speedway Complex	Mike Lichty
7	July 29	Hy-Miler Nationals Fast 40	Sandusky Speedway	Dave Shullick Jr.
8	July 30	Hy-Miler Nationals	Sandusky Speedway	Dave Shullick Jr.
9	August 5	Ollie Silva Memorial	Lee USA Speedway	Dave Shullick Jr.
10	August 6	Wings and Wheels	New London-Waterford Speedbowl	Mike McVetta
11	August 19	Harvey Lennox Series	Delaware Speedway	Mike Lichty
12	September 3	ISMA Super Nationals	Oswego Speedway	Dave Shullick Jr.
13	September 10	Star Classic	Star Speedway	Moe Lilje
14	October 16	World Series of Racing	Thompson Speedway Motorsports Park	Dave Shullick Jr.
