= Capital City Speedway =

Coordinates: 45.242°N 75.989°W

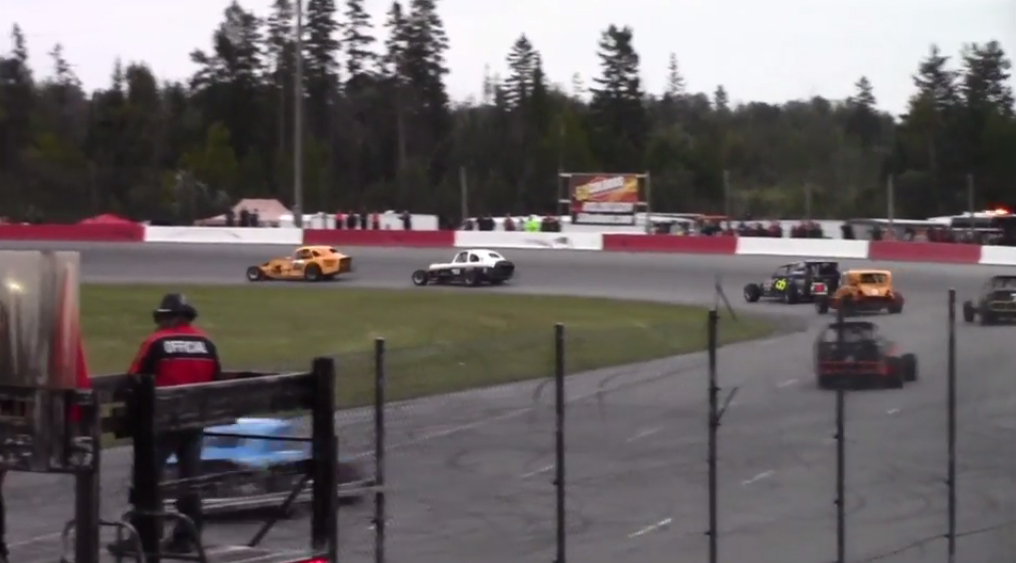
Capital City Speedway in 2014

Capital City Speedway was a racetrack in Ottawa, Ontario, Canada, located 5 kilometres (3.1 mi) southwest of Stittsville, Ontario. The Speedway included a dragstrip and a 3/8th mile oval, and ran five different series including the 4 For Fun class, Mini Stock Class, Thunder Car Class, ACT Late Model Class and the Lentch Automotive Legends Class. The Speedway's racing season ran from May until September annually. The Speedway has been closed since 2015.

== History ==
Capital City Speedway was founded in 1961 after the closure of the very popular Lansdowne Speedway. Lansdowne ran from 1955 until 1960 where the track had been a success, gathering 5,000 fans on its June 1, 1955 opening night. The track had been an old horse racing track that was in Lansdowne Park surrounding the football field where the Ottawa Rough Riders CFL team played. Many spectators and drivers came from as far as Montreal and New York State to race at the 1/3-mile track. But with the track being located in Ottawa's residential section, the noise created by the cars had local families unhappy. Neighbourhood complaints meant that the popular track had to close. After its closure, Gerry Bisson, who had been the race promoter, constructed a state of the art track near Stittsville, Ontario, just west of Ottawa, known as Capital City Speedway.

In 1994 Penny Bell (owner of restaurant Penny's Pit Stop in Perth, Ontario) bought the speedway and changed the name back to Capital City Speedway from former name Ottawa Valley Speedway. The track held races every Wednesday night during the summer along with other special events.

The 2010 season started with a new race promoter, driver Jeremy Coulter. There were many "rain outs" and there were only a handful of full nights completed. Coulter, who started the year as a manager for the track (hired by the Drummond family), resigned halfway through the season.

The 2015 season was to be saved by Mr Shawn Kerr, after many drivers meetings the Drummond family decided not to go with him.

== 2010 Series champions ==
Driver	Sponsor	Points
Late Models
Justin Holtom (17)	Top Hat	501
Thunder Cars
Greg Ogilvie (7)	Dean Ryans/ Bosch/ Castrol/ Benson Auto Parts/Ogilvie Motorsports	618
Lentech Motorsports Legends
Chad Windsor (5)	Wallace Service Center, Colron Excavating, Ritchies Welding, Graphiki, RLD, Stinsons, Daley Funeral Homes, Snake Island Automotive	546
Stittsville Trailers Mini Stocks
Doug Mould (27)	Sport Systems Canada	580
Crilly Chassis Works 4 For Fun
Quincy Roberts (71)		630

Source
Capital City Speedway

== Other race events ==
=== Monster Jam ===
Since 2006, Capital City Speedway has hosted Monster Jam in the first weeks of September. The event consists of increased laps and payouts for each racing series. For the ACT Late Models, this includes a 100-lap feature race and a $2000 payout. Following the 100-lap race are an enduro race, the fan-favourite trailer race and appearances by monster trucks Brutis and Avenger, as seen on Speed TV's Monster Jam show.

In 2009, due to only 8 late models showing up, the 100 lap race was moved down to three 25 lap races and used a points system to see who'd win.

Year	Car #	Driver	Team	Laps Complete	Won
2006	00	Steve Munro	Ryans Towing Dodge Charger	100	$5,000.
2007	31on	Spencer MacPherson	Napa Auto Parts Chevrolet Monte Carlo	100	$5,000.
2008	Rained out			0	
2009	2	Ken Baird	CarQuest	75	$2,000.

=== American Canadian Tour (Série ACT) ===
Série ACT (ACT) has held races at Capital City Speedway. The series is based in the northeastern United States and southern Canada. One of its races at the track was the Toromont Cat 100, a 100-lap race.

Year	Pole	Winning car #	Driver	Team	Laps	Laps Led	Won
2007	Eric St-Gelais (42)	27	Alexandre Gingras	Autobus la Québécoise Chevrolet Monte Carlo	100	76	$2125
2008	Karl Allard (48qc)	03	Martin Lacombe	R. Lacombe Demolition/ J. Dumont Construction Ford Fusion	100	17	$2135
2009	Spencer MacPherson (31on)	14on	Sean Kennedy	Waste Management Chevrolet Impala	100	75	$2825
