= Jim Shampine =

American racing driver (born 1941)

- Born: Donald James Shampine; March 25, 1941 Syracuse, New York
- Died: September 4, 1982 (aged 41)

Oval track racing career
- Debut season: 1962
- Car number: 8-Ball
- Championships: 8
- Finished last season: 1982

Previous series
- 1959-1961: Drag racing

Championship titles
- 1977 International Supermodified Association Champion

D. James Shampine (March 25, 1941 – September 4, 1982) was one of the most successful drivers in Supermodified competition and an equally skilled racer in asphalt and dirt-track Modified stock cars. He won 92 feature races at Oswego Speedway New York, and with his innovative car designs captured 38% of the Supermodified events held from 1970 to 1979.

== Racing career ==
Shampine began drag racing in 1959 at the quarter-mile ESTA Safety Park Dragstrip in Cicero, New York. Then in 1962 he bought his friend Nolan Swift's championship-winning “Ten Pins” numbered modified, converted it to a supermodified, and renumbered it the enduring “8-Ball”. He went on to win seven (1967, 1970, 1972–1974, 1976 & 1979) Oswego Speedway track championships, as well as an International Supermodified Association championship competing at venues throughout the northeast.

Shampine concurrently campaigned his modified at New York's asphalt speedways: Fulton, Lancaster, Shangri-La in Owego, Spencer in Williamson, and Utica-Rome in Vernon. He also competed successfully in a dirt-track modified at Langhorne Speedway in Pennsylvania and Weedsport Speedway in New York, and captured the 1970 track championship at the Rolling Wheels Raceway in Elbridge, New York.

Shampine died in an accident during modified racing competition at Oswego Speedway on September 4, 1982. He was inducted into the Eastern Motorsports Press Association, the Northeast Dirt Modified and the New York State Stock Car Association Halls of Fame.
