= Cyr =

Cyr may refer to:

- Cyr (album) by The Smashing Pumpkins
- Cyr, Montana, United States
- Cyr Plantation, Maine, United States
- Cyr wheel, an acrobatic device
- Colonia Airport (IATA: CYR), Colonia Department, Uruguay

== People with the surname ==
- Anne Marie Cyr (born 1963), Canadian singer
- Conrad K. Cyr (1931–2016), American senior judge
- Denis Cyr (born 1961), Canadian ice hockey player
- Éric Cyr (born 1979), Canadian baseball player
- Frank W. Cyr (1900–1995), American educator and author
- Jean-Paul Cyr (born 1965), American racing driver
- Josh Cyr, American musician and founder of band The World Is a Beautiful Place & I Am No Longer Afraid to Die
- Lili St. Cyr (1918–1999), American striptease artist
- Louis Cyr (1863–1912), Canadian strongman
- Myriam Cyr (born 1960), Canadian actress and author
- Paul Cyr (1963–2012), Canadian ice hockey player
- Tyler Cyr (born 1993), American baseball player
- Vincent Cyr, American media personality and member of gaming organization One True King

== See also ==
- Saint-Cyr (disambiguation)
- Saint Cyricus
- Cyrillic script
