= Russ Conway (disambiguation) =

Russ Conway (1925–2000) was an English pianist.

Russ Conway may also refer to:

- Russ Conway (actor) (1913–2009), Canadian-American actor
- Russ Conway (journalist) (1949–2019), American journalist
