= Thunder Road International SpeedBowl =

Automobile racetrack in Vermont, USA

Thunder Road International Speedbowl
Thunder Road, "Nation's Site of Excitement"
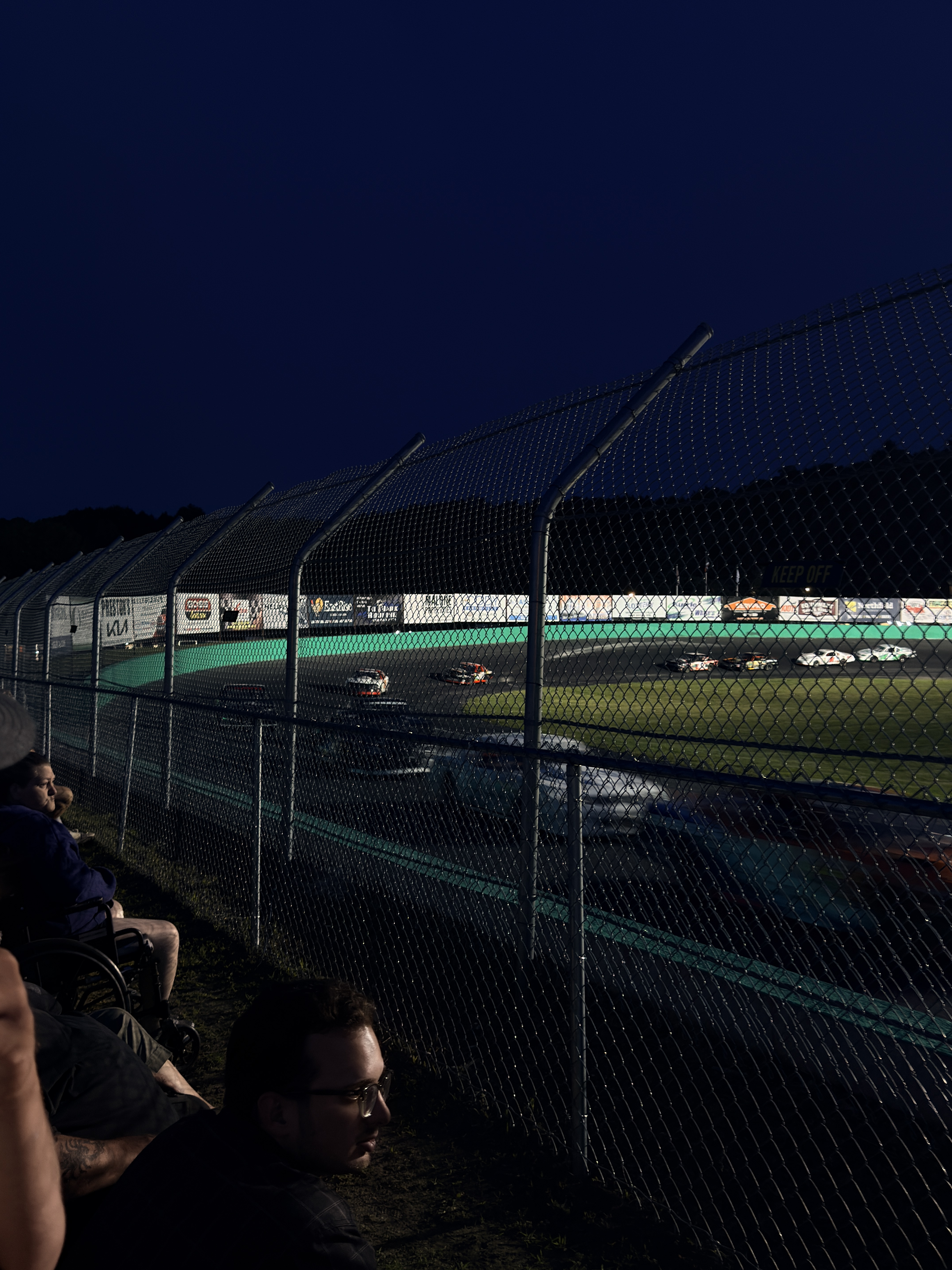
- Location: 80 Fisher Rd., Barre, Vermont 05641
- Coordinates: 44°10′47.26″N 72°29′16.63″W
- Capacity: 8,000
- Owner: Cris Michaud and Pat Malone (May 2017–present)
- Opened: 30 June 1960; 66 years ago
- Major events: Current: American Canadian Tour (1979–1980, 1982–1985, 2001–present); Future: NASCAR Whelen Modified Tour (2027); Former: NASCAR Busch North Series (1997–2003)
- Website: http://www.thunderroadspeedbowl.com

Oval (1960–present)
- Surface: Asphalt
- Length: 0.250 mi (0.402 km)
- Turns: 4
- Banking: 15°
- Official site

Thunder Road International Speedbowl, more commonly known as just Thunder Road, is a 0.250 mi (0.402 km) high-banked, paved short track speedway located in the town of Barre, Vermont. The track was founded by Ken Squier in 1960 and sold by Squier and co-owner Tom Curley in the spring of 2017 to former Thunder Road track champion Cris Michaud and local businessman Pat Malone. Currently, Thunder Road hosts three weekly championship divisions: Late Models, Flying Tigers, and Street Stocks along with the non-point Road Warrior class. The track is known for hosting its weekly races on Thursday night and as of April 2020 it was one of three active race tracks in Vermont.

== History ==
Ken Squier envisioned the need for an asphalt track in the area which had been full of dirt tracks. He worked with pavement contractor Reginald Cooley to build the track. Squier operated the track until selling to local businessman Tommy Kalomiris. Kalomiris operated the track for two years; he faced lawsuits in 1978 and the track only ran six events that year. Squier bought the track back in 1979 along with Tom Curley. After running four events in 1981, the duo was forced to shut the track down again due to a lawsuit. They regained control by 1982 and operated it until April 2017. They sold the track to former track champion Cris Michaud and real estate developer Pat Malone.

In 2009, as part of its 50th Season in operation, Thunder Road was visited by NASCAR legends Richard Petty and Bobby Allison. Current NASCAR drivers Tony Stewart, Clint Bowyer and David Ragan raced there at different events during the season as well.

The track was scheduled to host the second event of the 2023 Superstar Racing Experience season on July 20, 2023, but the event was moved to Stafford Motor Speedway, the site of the first event of the season, due to the 2023 Vermont floods. The track was awarded an SRX race in 2024 as a compromise, but it ultimately didn’t take place due to the cancellation of the 2024 SRX season.

== Touring Series ==
In the past, Thunder Road had hosted 22 races of NASCAR North Tour between 1979 and 1985. Winners include Chuck Bown, Robbie Crouch, Randy Lajoie, and Kevin Lepage. After the formation of the American-Canadian Tour in 1986, Thunder Road became sanctioned by the organization as well as host to nearly 150 ACT races between the Pro Stock, Late Model and Flying Tiger tours as of September, 2021. ACT winners include Jean-Paul Cyr, Brian Hoar and Phil Scott. It hosted 7 races of the NASCAR Busch North Series, a feeder series of NASCAR, between 1997 and 2003.

Currently, the track hosts regional touring series including the American Canadian Tour, the Pro All Stars Series and the New England Antique Racers. The track has hosted several high profile drivers from the highest level of NASCAR. On June 28, 2007, NASCAR driver Kenny Wallace raced at Thunder Road. Ken Schrader, another NASCAR driver, had raced once at Thunder Road each of the two years prior to Wallace's visit. In 2009, Tony Stewart made an appearance at the track. Clint Bowyer has raced in the track in 2013. Kyle Busch raced in Vermont in 2017. The next year in 2018, Christopher Bell raced at the highbanks. And most recently, Ryan Preece has visited in 2021. All these drivers making an appearance in the Vermont Governor's Cup, which is run on a Thursday night, which coincides with NASCARs visit to the New Hampshire Motor Speedway over the weekend. Phil Scott, current governor of Vermont, is a former track champion in 1996, 1998, and 2002.

== Milk Bowl ==
Thunder Road has hosted the "Milk Bowl" Late Model race since 1962. It is the season finale each fall, and consists of three 50-lap segments, with cumulative scoring and full-field inversions between segments. The driver with the highest combined total of finishes in the three segments is declared the winner, receives a loving cup full of milk as the trophy, and is expected to kiss a cow in Victory Circle.

== Past Track Champions (King of the Road) ==
The title of King of the Road is given to the highest points winner of the top weekly division at Thunder Road. While the other divisions have their respective champions, King of the Road is the most coveted title at Thunder Road. There have been fifty-five Kings of the Road; the one female driver who won the track championship, Tracie Bellerose, was christened the 2000 Queen of the Road. Vermont's governor since 2017, Phil Scott, is a longtime participant in Thunder Road's Late Model series, and is a three-time King of the Road (1996, 1998, 2002).

Year	Driver	Hometown	Division
1960	Ronnie Marvin	Bethlehem, NH	Sportsman Coupe
1961	Roy "Pappy" Forsythe	Keene, NH	Sportsman Coupe
1962	Lee Ingerson	Jefferson, NH	Sportsman Coupe
1963	Lee Ingerson	Jefferson, NH	Sportsman Coupe
1964	Harold "Hardluck" Hanaford	Plymouth, NH	Sportsman Coupe
1965	Harold "Hardluck" Hanaford	Plymouth, NH	Sportsman Coupe
1966	Larry Demar	Hardwick, VT	Flying Tiger
1967	Larry Demar	Hardwick, VT	Flying Tiger
1968	Tom Tiller	Essex Jct., VT	Flying Tiger
1969	Clement "Desperate" Despault	Waterbury, VT	Flying Tiger
1970	Bobby Giroux	South Burlington, VT	Limited Sportsman
1971	Jean-Paul Cabana	Sherrington, QC	Late Model Sportsman
1972	Bobby Giroux	South Burlington, VT	Late Model Sportsman
1973	Bobby Dragon	Milton, VT	Late Model Sportsman
1974	Joey Kourafas	Sharon, MA	Late Model Sportsman
1975	Dave Dion	Hudson, NH	Late Model Sportsman
1976	Bobby Dragon	Milton, VT	Late Model Sportsman
1977	Dave Dion	Hudson, VT	Late Model Sportsman
1978	Stanley "Stub" Fadden	North Haverhill, NH	Late Model Sportsman
1979	Stanley "Stub" Fadden	North Haverhill, NH	Late Model Sportsman
1980	Jean-Paul Cabana	Sherrington, QC	Late Model Sportsman
1981	–Track Closed–		
1982	Joey Laquerre	East Montpelier, VT	Flying Tiger
1983	Clement "Desperate" Despault	Waterbury, VT	Flying Tiger
1984	Larry Caron	Williston, VT	Flying Tiger
1985	Chuck Beede	Williamstown, VT	Flying Tiger
1986	Norm Andrews	Northfield, VT	Flying Tiger
1987	Dan Beede	Williamstown, VT	Flying Tiger
1988	Ron Lamell, Jr	Essex Junction, VT	Flying Tiger
1989	Greg "Burger" Blake	East Barre, VT	Flying Tiger
1990	Joey Laquerre, Jr.	East Montpelier, VT	Flying Tiger
1991	Dwayne Lanphear	Morrisville, VT	Flying Tiger
1992	Chuck Beede	Williamstown, VT	Late Model
1993	Chuck Beede	Williamstown, VT	Late Model
1994	Chuck Beede	Williamstown, VT	Late Model
1995	Dave Whitcomb	Essex Junction, VT	Late Model
1996	Phil Scott	Middlesex, VT	Late Model
1997	Pete Fecteau	Morrisville, VT	Late Model
1998	Phil Scott	Middlesex, VT	Late Model
1999	Brian Hoar	Williston, VT	Late Model
2000	Tracie Bellerose	Gorham, NH	Late Model
2001	Cris Michaud	Northfield, VT	Late Model
2002	Phil Scott	Middlesex, VT	Late Model
2003	Jamie Fisher	Shelburne, VT	Late Model
2004	Cris Michaud	Williamstown, VT	Late Model
2005	Cris Michaud	Williamstown, VT	Late Model
2006	Chad Wheeler	Waterbury Center., VT	Late Model
2007	Dave Pembroke	Montpelier, VT	Late Model
2008	Eric Williams	Hyde Park, VT	Late Model
2009	Jean-Paul Cyr	Milton, VT	Late Model
2010	Nick Sweet	Barre, VT	Late Model
2011	Dave Pembroke	Montpelier, VT	Late Model
2012	Nick Sweet	Barre, VT	Late Model
2013	Derrick O'Donnell	North Haverhill, NH	Late Model
2014	Derrick O'Donnell	North Haverhill, NH	Late Model
2015	Derrick O'Donnell	North Haverhill, NH	Late Model
2016	Scott Dragon	Milton, VT	Late Model
2017	Bobby Therrien	Hinesburg, VT	Late Model
2018	Scott Dragon	Milton, VT	Late Model
2019	Jason Corliss	Barre, VT	Late Model
2020	Jason Corliss	Barre, VT	Late Model
2021	Jason Corliss	Barre, VT	Late Model
2022	Christopher Pelkey	Graniteville, VT	Late Model
2023	Stephen Donahue	Graniteville, VT	Late Model
2024	Kaiden Fisher	Shelburne, VT	Late Model
2025	Jason Corliss	Barre, VT	Late Model
