= Champion Racing Association =

US stock car racing sanctioning body

- Sport: Stock car racing
- Jurisdiction: United States
- Abbreviation: CRA
- Founded: 1997
- Headquarters: Salem, Indiana

Official website
- www.cra-racing.com
- (United States)

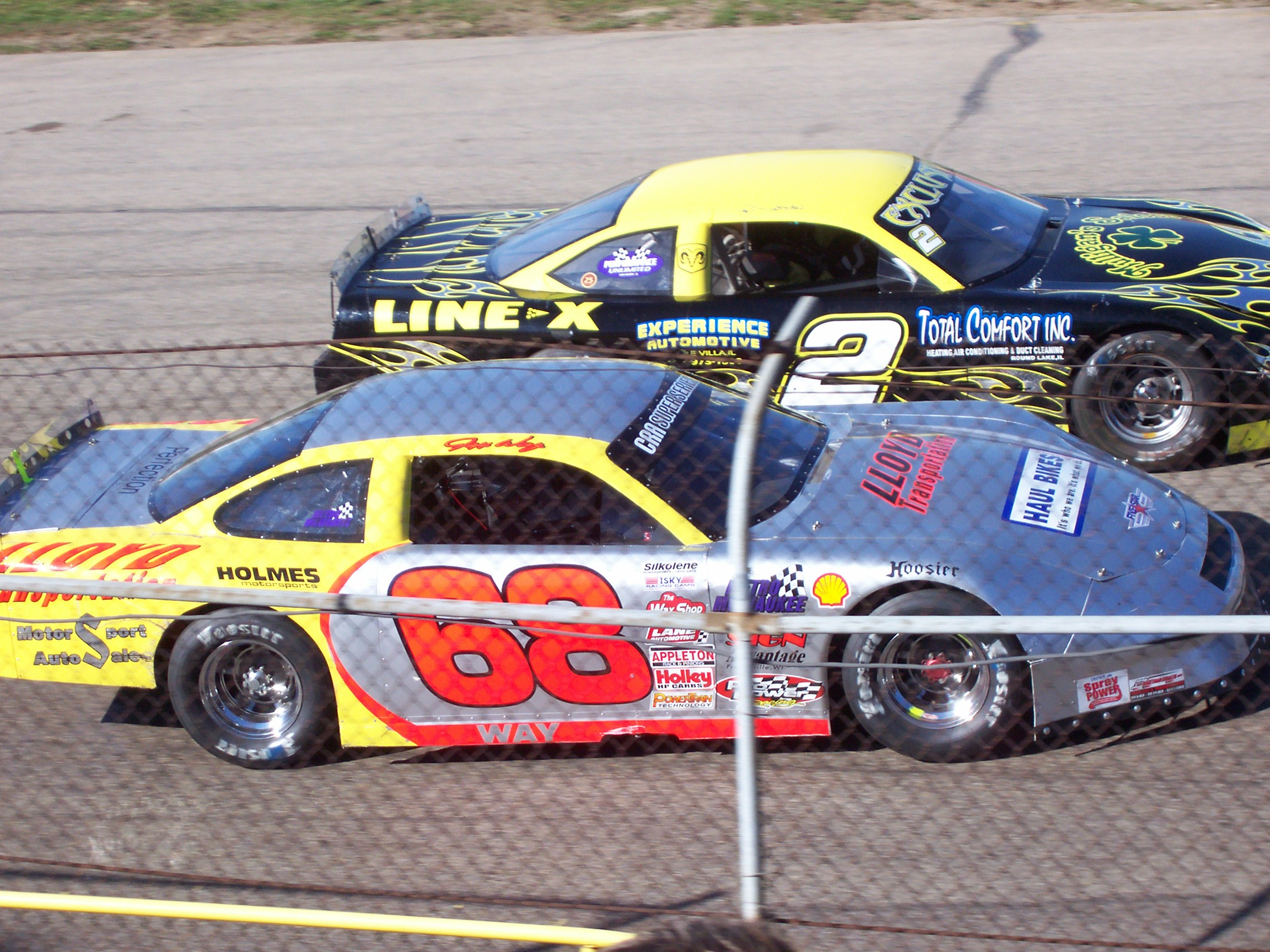
2006 CRA Super Series racecar #68

Champion Racing Association (CRA) is a stock car racing sanctioning body based in the Midwestern United States. It was founded in 1997 by Glenn Luckett and R. J. Scott, who then sold the company to Bob Sargent's Track Enterprises in 2022. All CRA cars use Hoosier tires and Sunoco fuel.

== CRA Champions (1997–present) ==
Year	Super Series	All-Stars Tour	Sportsman	Street Stock
1997	Kenny Tweedy	n/a	n/a	n/a
1998	Brian Rievely	n/a	n/a	n/a
1999	Brian Ross	n/a	n/a	n/a
2000	Scott Hantz	n/a	n/a	n/a
2001	Brian Ross (2)	n/a	n/a	n/a
2002	Joel Kauffman	n/a	n/a	n/a
2003	Bobby Parsley	n/a	n/a	n/a
2004	Chuck Barnes Jr	n/a	n/a	n/a
2005	Jeff Lane	n/a	not awarded	Dean Baker
2006	Scott Hantz (2)	n/a	Keith Sterkowitz	Joe Beaver
2007	Chris Gabehart	n/a	Billy Hutson	Joe Beaver (2)
2008	Scott Hantz (3)	n/a	Tony Dager	Bret Miles Jr
2009	Johnny VanDoorn	n/a	Charlie Hanna	Joe Beaver (3)
2010	Johnny VanDoorn (2)	n/a	Charlie Hanna (2)	Steve Christman
2011	Derrick Griffin	Erik Jones	Keith Sterkowitz (2)	Jeff Lane
2012	Johnny VanDoorn (3)	Daniel Hemric	K.C. Spillers	Jimmy Kirby
2013	Travis Braden	Cody Coughlin	Mark Lambert	Dustin Burge
2014	Travis Braden (2)	Dan Leeck	Greg Van Alst	Jason Atkinson
2015	Grant Quinlan	Dalton Armstrong	Jason Atkinson	Jason Atkinson (2)
2016	Cody Coughlin	Cody Coughlin (2)	Eddie Van Meter	Phil Jenkins
2017	Logan Runyon	Jack Dossey III	Jason Neal	Colby Lane
2018	Josh Brock	Jack Dossey III	Tony Brutti	James Kirby III
2019	Greg Van Alst	Dan Leeck (2)	Zachary Tinkle	Jacob McElfresh
2020	Josh Brock (2)	Cody Coughlin (3)	Bily Hutson (2)	Brandon Roberts
2021	Hunter Jack	Cody Coughlin (4)	Billy Hutson (3)	Jason Atkinson (3)
2022	Eddie Van Meter	Dakota Stroup	Keegan Sobilo	Jason Atkinson (4)
2023	Gio Ruggiero	Chase Burda	Caleb Reschar	Dalton Conner
2024	Chase Burda	Blake Rowe	Zach Stacy	Dalton Conner (2)

== CRA-sanctioned series ==
=== ASA/CRA Super Series ===
The ASA/CRA Super Series is the premier series of the Champion Racing Association. It was formerly known as the Kendall Late Model Series and the Sunoco Super Series. The series utilizes Super Late Models. Regulations on engine and body are NASCAR legal. Like NASCAR, the car body designs are based on the Holden Commodore, Dodge Charger, Ford Fusion, and the Toyota Camry.

=== JEGS All Stars Tour ===
Champion Racing Association purchased the Michigan-based Super Pro Series and began in 2011. The JEGS All Stars Tour utilizes Pro Late Models, which is powered by a crate engine. The crate engine rule is meant to reduce the costs of the engines to the competitors. The crate engines are built by the automobile manufacturers themselves, such as General Motors and Ford.

=== Late Model Sportsman Series ===
The CRA Late Model Sportsman Series debuted in 2005.

=== Street Stock Series ===
The CRA Street Stock Series debuted in 2005.

== Past series ==
=== Vore's FWD Compacts Series ===
The most recent series champion was Jeff Shelmadine in 2011. In late 2011 however, Champion Racing Association disbanded its promotion of the Compacts, and this division is now promoted by series sponsor Vore's Welding.

== 2025 ASA/CRA Super Series Schedule ==
Date	Track	Location	Winner
January 17 (Note: Race moved from January 18 due to threat of weather.)	Cordele Motor Speedway (Note: Co-sanctoned race with ASA Southern Super Series, non-championship event for CRA Super Series.)	Cordele, Georgia	Bubba Pollard
April 5	Dominion Raceway (Note: Co-sanctoned race with STARS National Tour, results will count towards both championships.)	Thornburg, Virginia	
May 3	Nashville Fairgrounds Speedway (Note: Co-sanctoned race with ASA Southern Super Series, results will count towards both championships.)	Nashville, Tennessee	
June 21	Flat Rock Speedway	Flat Rock, Michigan	
July 26	Anderson Speedway (Note: Redbud 400 Co-sanctoned race with STARS National Tour, results will count towards both championships.)	Anderson, Indiana	
August 20	Owosso Speedway (Note: Co-sanctoned race with STARS National Tour, results will count towards both championships.)	Ovid, Michigan	
September 13	Toledo Speedway (Note: Co-sanctoned race with STARS National Tour, results will count towards both championships.)	Toledo, Ohio	
October 12	Winchester Speedway (Note: Winchester 400 race with STARS National Tour, results will count towards both championships.)	Winchester, Indiana	
November 9	Nashville Fairgrounds Speedway (Note: All American 400 co-sanctoned race with STARS National Tour and Southern Super Series, non-championship event for SSS and CRA.)	Nashville, Tennessee	

== 2025 JEGS/CRA All-Stars Tour Schedule ==
Date	Track	Location	Winner
January 17 (Note: Race moved from January 18 due to threat of weather.)	Cordele Motor Speedway (Note: Non-championship event.)	Cordele, Georgia	Ben Maier
April 19	Toledo Speedway	Toledo, Ohio	
May 10	Anderson Speedway	Anderson, Indiana	
May 26	Owosso Speedway	Owosso, Michigan	
May 29	Nashville Fairgrounds Speedway	Nashville, Tennessee (Note: Non-championship event.)	
June 21	Flat Rock Speedway	Flat Rock, Michigan	
July 5	Whittemore Speedway	Whittemore, Michigan	
July 16	Owosso Speedway (Note: Masters of the Pros 200)	Owosso, Michigan	
August 8	Corrigan Oil Speedway	Mason, Michigan	
August 23	Jennerstown Speedway (Note: Non-championship event.)	Jennerstown, Pennsylvania	
August 30	Kalamazoo Speedway	Kalamazoo, Michigan	
September 6	Auto City Speedway	Clio, Michigan	
September 20	Owosso Speedway (Note: New Stars Showdown; Non-championship event.)	Owosso, Michigan	
September 21	Owosso Speedway	Owosso, Michigan	
October 10	Winchester Speedway	Winchester, Indiana	
November 8	Nashville Fairgrounds Speedway (Note: All American 100; Non-championship event.)	Nashville, Tennessee	

== 2025 CRA Sportsman Series Schedule ==
Date	Track	Location	Winner
March 30	Shady Bowl Speedway	DeGraff, Ohio	
April 26	Anderson Speedway	Anderson, Indiana	
June 7	Salem Speedway	Salem, Indiana	
June 28	Owosso Speedway	Owosso, Michigan	
September 1	Winchester Speedway	Winchester, Indiana	
September 13	Anderson Speedway	Anderson, Indiana	
October 11	Winchester Speedway	Winchester, Indiana	

== 2025 CRA Street Stock Series Schedule ==
Date	Track	Location	Winner
March 30	Shady Bowl Speedway	DeGraff, Ohio	
April 12	Highland Rim Speedway	Greenbrier, Tennessee	
April 26	Anderson Speedway	Anderson, Indiana	
May 26	Owosso Speedway	Owosso, Michigan	
May 29	Nashville Fairgrounds Speedway	Nashville, Tennessee	
June 14	Anderson Speedway	Anderson, Indiana	
July 5	Salem Speedway	Salem, Indiana	
August 9	Anderson Speedway	Anderson, Indiana	
September 1	Winchester Speedway	Winchester, Indiana	
September 13	Anderson Speedway	Anderson, Indiana	
October 11	Winchester Speedway	Winchester, Indiana	
November 8	Nashville Fairgrounds Speedway	Nashville, Tennessee	

== CRA tracks ==
Track name	Location	Length
Anderson Speedway	Anderson, Indiana	.250 mile
Angola Motor Speedway	Angola, Indiana	.375 mile
Baer Field Speedway	Fort Wayne, Indiana	.500 mile
Berlin Raceway	Marne, Michigan	.438 mile
Columbus Motor Speedway	Columbus, Ohio	.333 mile
Fairgrounds Speedway	Nashville, Tennessee	.625 mile
O'Reilly Raceway Park	Clermont, Indiana	.686 mile
Plymouth Speedway	Plymouth, Indiana	.375 mile
Shady Bowl Speedway	De Graff, Ohio	.300 mile
Toledo Speedway	Toledo, Ohio	.500 mile
Winchester Speedway	Winchester, Indiana	.500 mile
Lanier National Speedway	Braselton, Georgia	.375 mile
Mount Lawn Speedway	New Castle, Indiana	.300 mile
Monroe Motor Speedway	Monroe, Louisiana	.375 mile
Salem Speedway	Salem, Indiana	.555 mile
South Alabama Speedway	Opp, Alabama	.400 mile
Crisp Motorsports Park	Cordele, Georgia	.375 mile

== Notable drivers ==
- Gary St. Amant (2 Time ASA National Champion)
- Chuck Barnes, Jr. (2004 CRA Champion, Roush “Driver X” TV Finalist)
- Kyle Busch (NASCAR driver)
- Landon Cassill (2009 NASCAR Rookie of the Year)
- Chase Elliott (2011 CRA champion)
- Chet Fillip (Little 500 Sprint Car Champion, Daytona 500 & Indy 500 Veteran)
- Jeff Fultz (NASCAR All-Pro Champion)
- Mike Garvey (NASCAR All-Pro Champion, NASCAR Busch, & ASA)
- Bobby Gill (Hooters Pro-Cup Champion, NASCAR Craftsmen Trucks)
- Charlie Glotzbach (1964 ARCA Rookie of the Year)
- Brett Sontag (2004 ASA National Tour Rookie of the Year)
- Nathan Haseleu (Former NASCAR Craftsman Truck Series driver)
- Shelby Howard (NASCAR Craftsmen Trucks, Busch and Hooters Pro-Cup)
- Joel Kauffman (2002 CRA Champion, Hooters and NASCAR Busch)
- Ryan Newman (NASCAR driver)
- Ken Schrader (former NASCAR driver)
- David Stremme (NASCAR driver)
- Kenny Wallace (NASCAR driver)

== See also ==
- ASA
- ACT
- CARS Tour
- PASS
- SRL Southwest Tour
