= Microd =

Racing series

Microd (short for MICro Hot ROD) racing is a form of youth automobile racing unique to Central New York state. Drivers race on a 1/10 mile dirt or paved oval track. Novice drivers typically race at speeds of 20 mph (32 km/h), while older drivers may exceed 50 mph (80 km/h). Traditional wood-frame microds were homemade vehicles built of common materials such as plywood with 2x2 wood mainframes and pulley-actuated steering. Microd clubs may also race metal-frame classes which resemble the outer appearance of the "classic" wood-frame microds but feature full suspension, tie-rod type steering, and wooden exterior. Both varieties have full rollcages. Additionally, there is a sister class termed "Open Wheels" which use quarter midget style cars, and share the 1/10 mi. oval race course. Syracuse-Geddes microd club features a somewhat shortened track, making it a bit long for the quarter-midgets, but short for the microds, estimated to be 1/15 mi. vs. the standard 1/10 mile. Several notable Northeast racing families have gotten their start at a Microd club.

There are several clubs in the state, Mid-State Microd Club (Cortland, NY), Little Wheels Speedway (Freeville, NY), Syracuse-Geddes Microd and Quarter Midget Club (NYS Fairgrounds in Syracuse), Sodus Microd Club (Sodus, NY), Southern Tier Microd Club (Candor, NY), Tri-County Microd Club (Trumansburg, NY), and several now defunct tracks: Southern Tier Microd Club (historic, at Shangri-La Speedway), Homer Microd Club (Homer, NY), a track in Lyons, NY, as well as occasional special one-off events held at Paradise Speedway (Geneva, NY)

== Cars ==
There are three divisions of microd racing: traditional wood-frame microds, steel frame microds, and open wheel microds (similar to, as well as including, quarter midgets). The cars in all divisions are powered by a 3 to 6 horsepower lawnmower engine with a single gearing driving the left rear wheel by a chain, or both rear wheels by the use of a live axle. Metal-frame microds typically have live axles and full suspension while "classic" wood-frame microds rely on frame flex from the wood only. "Classic" wood-frames also tend to be left-rear drive wheel only. True to Bob Robinson's original vision, families often build the cars themselves in accordance with the construction specifications provided in the NYSMA plan book.

There have been 2 main evolutions in microd frame design. The first occurred with the "classic" design replacing the original concept in the mid 1960's. In the "Classic," the axles were moved from below the wood 2x2 frame rails to above. This lowered the microd's center of gravity, leading to a more stable design. A rollcage was also integrated for roll-over safety. The second evolution was the introduction of the "metal frame" design in the late 1970's and early 1980's. While car performance was increased with the new material, the metal-frame designs require additional fabrication skills and capabilities. The sparse rulebook allows for creativity in the design for metal frames, while nearly all "classic" woodframe cars follow the original plan book. It is notable that both forms of microdding still exist side-by-side, with drivers and families sometimes owning each variety.

== History ==
The sport originated in Skaneateles, NY in 1954 when Edwin Robinson Sr. and his son Edwin (Bob) Robinson Jr. designed the original wood-frame microd. After local children began driving the cars around the village streets, the village approached the Robinsons to develop the first microd track. The original clay track was located on the grounds of the current Allyn Arena. Bob Robinson conceived the sport as a way for families to learn practical fabrication skills together, as well as spend fun weekends competing safely at the track.

NASCAR driver Doug Heveron began his racing career at the Syracuse-Geddes MicRod Track at the age of 8. Fellow NASCAR driver Regan Smith began his racing career also at the Syracuse-Geddes Microd track at the age of 6, driving Microds and Open-Wheels (a vehicle similar to a modern-day quarter midger with a 5hp briggs flathead powerplant, full suspension, and bodies that often resembled Eastern Dirt Modifieds.)
