= Mount Lawn Speedway =

"The Lawn"
- Location: New Castle, Indiana
- Coordinates: 39.909707°N 85.460911°W
- Owner: Rick Sweigart
- Opened: 1934
- Architect: George Sweigart
- Major events: The May 5-0's, The Raintree 100, The Crown Vic Challenge 100
- Surface: Asphalt
- Length: .3 mi (0.48 km)
- Banking: None

Mount Lawn Speedway, also known as The Lawn, is a 0.3-mile (0.48 km) asphalt, egg-shaped oval track located in New Castle, Indiana.

== History ==
Mt. Lawn Speedway was founded in 1935 by Dr. George W. Sweigart, a dentist and a former mayor of the town of Hartford City, Indiana. At the time of the track's opening, it was a one-fifth-mile pear-shaped dirt oval. Also constructed during the track's early years were a dance hall, a swimming pool, and summer cabins for vacationers. The dance hall played host to two of the most influential big band musicians of the era, The Dorsey Brothers and Sammy Kaye. However, in 1939, a fire caused by an overheated exhaust fan in the orchestra pit led to the dance hall's first demise. When the hall was rebuilt, a second fire caused by a coal-powered fireplace led to the dancehall's second, and ultimately final, demise.

In 1940, Sweigart closed the track down, and it appeared that racing in Henry County was over. However, later that year, a local promoter named Dutch Hurst visited the area looking for a lighting system for a track that he was constructing, known as the Muncie Velodrome, located in Muncie, Indiana. When he noticed the layout of the land, he mentioned to Sweigart, "Why don't you start a track here?" When Sweigart replied that the land had indeed been a race track before, Hurst convinced Sweigart to reopen the track. In 1941, he hired a local farmer to till the land as Sweigart and residents rebuilt the track. However, later that summer, the dirt surface of the track had worn down, and it was decided that a new surface would be needed. So Sweigart hired a crew from the area, and the first concrete surface was laid on the track. This paving would be followed by three repavings in asphalt in 1947, 1967, and finally in 1971.

Over the next 73 years, the track would see many famous names grace its presence, including Tony Stewart, Ed Carpenter, Pat O'Connor, Tom Cherry, Art Cross, and many others. It was a hotbed for open-wheel modifieds in the 1980s and 1990s, as the IMCA Modified Series would see drivers from across the Midwest come to the Speedway to try their hands at the tricky course against the local stars. Following the dwindling of the IMCA series in the late 1990s, late model stock cars would return to prominence in the area and would become the standard-bearer for the next decade and a half. In 2014, the track would close temporarily due to declining interest and car counts and would remain closed til 2016, as interest returned. The late model stocks, however, would not, as street stocks would become the Premier division at the track, and all late model races would be promoted by the Champion Racing Association Late Model Sportsman Series.

Late in 2019, it was announced that driver Dave Duncan and former Winchester Speedway co-promoter Jimmy Wyman would begin promoting all races at Mt. Lawn, with Rick Sweigart still retaining ownership. Modified racing would make its full-time return, with a slate of races in 2020. The first race under the new agreement would take place on June 14, with Jeff Lane, a longtime competitor in the previous incarnations of the modified, late model, and street stock classes, winning the first race. The promotions duo of Wyman and Duncan would see the beginning of a fruitful period for the small Indiana track, with good car counts becoming a common occurrence. Following the passing of Duncan in 2023, however, Wyman would step down and hand over promoting duties for 2024 to former racer, car owner, and fabricator Steve Ellis.

== The Big Three ==
There are three big events that are currently run at The Mt. Lawn Speedway. The May 5–0, which is held the evening before the Indianapolis 500, The Raintree 100, which is a 100-lap Economy Modified event, and The Crown Vic Challenge 100, a 100-lap race for Mt. Lawn's Crown Vic Division.

== Raintree 100 winners ==
Year	Driver	Hometown
1971	Gene Prosser	New Castle, Indiana
1972	Dennis Miles	Muncie, Indiana
1973	L.J. Lines	Greensboro, Indiana
1974	Harold Scott	New Castle, Indiana
1975	Harold Scott	New Castle, Indiana
1976	L.J. Lines	Indianapolis, Indiana
1977	Rocky Tharp	Cowan, Indiana
1978	Bob Fields	Willow Branch, Indiana
1979	Harold Scott	New Castle, Indiana
1980	Jim Spears	Noblesville, Indiana
1981	Harold Scott	New Castle, Indiana
1982	L.J. Lines	Indianapolis, Indiana
1983	Harold Scott	New Castle, Indiana
1984	Bob Fields	Willow Branch, Indiana
1985	Bob Fields	Willow Branch, Indiana
1986	Herb Rose	Anderson, Indiana
1987	Rick Rhonemus	Desoto, Indiana
1988	Dave Duncan	Cicero, Indiana
1989	Dave Duncan	Cicero, Indiana
1990	Rick Rhonemus	Desoto, Indiana
1991	Don Skaggs	Modoc, Indiana
1992	Rick Rhonemus	Desoto, Indiana
1993	Rick Rhonemus	Desoto, Indiana
1994	L.J. Lines	Indianapolis, Indiana
1995	Rodney Scott	New Castle, Indiana
1996	Joe Beaver	Noblesville, Indiana
1997	Jeff Lane	Knightstown, Indiana
1998	Gerald Hinshaw	Mooreland, Indiana
1999	Rodney Scott	New Castle, Indiana
2000	William Mefford	Knightstown, Indiana
2001	Andy Cowan	Cambridge City, Indiana
2002	Gerald Hinshaw	Mooreland, Indiana
2003	Scott Neal	Mt Summit, Indiana
2004	William Mefford	Knightstown, Indiana
2005	Scott Hinshaw	Indianapolis, Indiana
2006	Scott Hinshaw	Indianapolis, Indiana
2007	William Mefford	Knightstown, Indiana
2008	Terry Cater	New Castle, Indiana
2009	Kevin Claborn	Cambridge City, Indiana
2010	Jeff Marcum	Morristown, Indiana
2011	Jeff Marcum	Morristown, Indiana
2012	Jason Thompson	Shirley, Indiana
2013	Jack Dossey III	Indianapolis, Indiana
2016	Ryan Amonett	New Castle, Indiana
2018	Jeff Marcum	Morristown, Indiana
2019	Zachary Tinkle	Speedway, Indiana
2020	Austin Coe	Ft. Wayne, Indiana
2021	Austin Coe	Ft. Wayne, Indiana
2022	Ryan Amonett	New Castle, Indiana
2023	Ryan Amonett	New Castle, Indiana
2024	Ryan Amonett	New Castle, Indiana (first driver to win 3-consecutive Raintree 100s)
2025	Adam Lee	New Castle, Indiana

== Divisions ==
Currently there are 3 Weekly Divisions at Mt. Lawn Speedway.

The Late Model Division is the Premier weekly division. The frame for this division is a General Motors 1978 to 1987; "G" body, 108.1", metric frame. However, cars may be powered by any engine brand. The cars must run complete late model bodies, including roof, that resemble a stock make and model. The "current" Late Model Division made its debut on May 13, 2000. Six cars were at the track on opening night. Today the division typically has twenty or more cars on hand each week.

The Thundercar Division is the Intermediate weekly division at Mt. Lawn Speedway. Thundercars are mostly stock, with a few after-market racing components allowed. Any rear-wheel-drive full-sized car with a wheelbase of not less than 108 inches is eligible to compete in the Thundercar Division.

The Hornet Division is the Beginner weekly division. Hornets are a strictly stock class. Four or six-cylinder cars are eligible to compete. Four-cylinder cars may be front- or rear-wheel drive. Six-cylinder cars can be front-wheel drive only. The wheelbase, no matter the drive train, must be between 92" and 108".

== Past champions ==
Late models
Year	Driver	Hometown
2002	Scott Neal	Middletown
2003	Dean Baker	
2004		
2005		
2006	L.J. Lines	Greensboro
2007	William Mefford	Knightstown
2008	Eric Evans	Greenfield
2009	Eric Evans	Greenfield

Thundercars
Year	Driver	Hometown
2002	David Graham	Rushville
2003	Chuck Cook	
2004	Jeff Marcum	Morristown
2005		
2006		
2007	Eric Evans	Greenfield
2008	Kevin Claborn	Cambridge City
2009	Ryan Amonett	New Castle
