= Fred DeSarro =

American racing driver

Frederick John DeSarro (July 3, 1937 - November 1, 1978) was an American racecar driver. He was the 1970 NASCAR National Modified Champion. In NASCAR's Modified All-Time Top 10 drivers, he was ranked eighth.

== Career ==
Fred DeSarro was a hydroplane racer as a late teenager in the Rhode Island area. He also raced go-karts, drag raced and was a competitive bowler before turning to auto racing.

DeSarro started his stock car racing career at the then Waterford Speedbowl driving Bob "Slim" Ross' #222 'Bounty Hunter' car. The team then moved over to the Norwood Arena Speedway by the mid 1960's. Ross' team folded soon after and DeSarro built his own #11 Sportsman coupe. He won the 1967 Sportsman Track Championship at Norwood. He finished runner-up to the NASCAR Modified Championship in 1968.

In 1970, DeSarro won the NASCAR Modified National Championship driving the Sonny Koszela "Woodchopper" Special #15. Among several tracks, they raced regularly that season at Albany-Saratoga on Friday nights and won the Modified Championship there as well. This was the only season he drove for the Koszela team.

In 1971, DeSarro started his association with Lenny Boehler and the "Ole Blue" #3, while Bugsy Stevens, who won 3 straight Modified Championships driving for Boehler, took over driving the Koszela car.

In 1972, DeSarro won the inaugural Spring Sizzler and went on to win the Stafford Motor Speedway Championship, and won the Stafford Modified Championship again in 1976.

In 1974 DeSarro won the first of four (1974–1977) consecutive Thompson Modified division track championships, winning 14 feature events alone during the 1974 season. Fred also won the Race of Champions (modified racing) at the Trenton Speedway in 1974 in a dramatic photo-finish over Stevens in the Koszela #15 car.

DeSarro was critically injured during a practice session at the Thompson International Speedway on October 8, 1978 when his car launched over the sandbanks in turn 3. He suffered a skull fracture. He died several weeks later on November 1, 1978.

A documentary on DeSarro's life and career was produced by southern New England racing historian & videographer Sid DiMaggio and released on his YouTube channel in late 2022 as part of his "Inside the Vault" documentary series. It includes interviews with DeSarro's family, members of his race team, fellow racers, journalists and family friends.

== Career Accomplishments ==
- 1967 Sportsman Champion - Norwood Arena
- 1970 Modified Champion - Albany-Saratoga Speedway
- 1970 NASCAR National Modified Champion
- 1972 Stafford Spring Sizzler winner
- 1972 Modified Champion - Stafford Speedway
- 1972 NASCAR Connecticut State Champion
- 1974 Modified Champion - Thompson Speedway
- 1974 Trenton Race of Champions winner
- 1975 Modified Champion - Thompson Speedway
- 1976 Modified Champion - Thompson Speedway
- 1976 Modified Champion - Stafford Speedway
- 1976 NASCAR Connecticut State Champion
- 1977 Modified Champion - Thompson Speedway
- 1999 inducted into New England Auto Racers Hall of Fame
- 2003 10 greatest NASCAR Modified Drivers
- 2003 100 greatest NASCAR Drivers
- 2014 inducted into Eastern Motor Sports Press Association Hall of Fame
