= American Canadian Tour =

Late model stock car racing series

- Category: Stock car racing
- Country: New England and New York, United States; Quebec, New Brunswick, and Nova Scotia, Canada
- Inaugural season: 1979
- Drivers' champion: American-Canadian Tour – Gabe Brown (2024); Série ACT Quebec – Raphaël Lessard (2024)
- Official website: ACT Tour

The American-Canadian Tour (ACT) is an independent regional stock car racing series based in the northeastern United States, and Eastern Canada. The American-Canadian Tour was founded in 1979 and conducts professionally-run stock car racing events across New England and Quebec.

== History ==
In 1979, famed television and radio journalist Ken Squier and business partner Tom Curley formed the North Tour sanctioned by NASCAR for Late Model Sportsman-type cars. Stars of the day included New England drivers Beaver and Bobby Dragon, Dave Dion, and Dick McCabe; Canada’s Jean-Paul Cabana and Claude Leclerc; and invaders Robbie Crouch of Tampa, Florida and Chuck Bown of Portland, Oregon. With sponsorship from companies like Coors, Molson, Skoal, STP, Valvoline, and General Motors, the North Tour visited the short track showplaces of the northeastern U.S. and Canada: Vermont’s Thunder Road; Maine’s Oxford Plains Speedway, Connecticut's Stafford Springs and Thompson; Sanair Super Speedway near Montreal, Jukasa Motor Speedway in Ontario, and Dover Motor Speedway in Delaware. Southern stars Butch Lindley, Bill Dennis, Harry Gant, and Tommy Ellis were frequent visitors to NASCAR North Tour events, along with national icons Bobby Allison, Buddy Baker, and Dale Earnhardt.

After the NASCAR sanction dissolved at the end of 1985, Curley incorporated his roster of teams into the independent American-Canadian Tour in 1986 and made a total changeover from the NASCAR Late Model Sportsman to the Pro Stock cars used throughout the country. In 1987, Curley’s ACT aligned with Rex Robbins’ American Speed Association (ASA) of the Midwest and Bob Harmon’s All-Pro Series of the southeast, forming the Stock Car Connection. The SCC visited high-profile tracks in Cincinnati, Milwaukee, Nazareth, PA, and Nashville, and saw visitors that included Darrell Waltrip, Mark Martin, Bobby and Davey Allison, and Rusty and Kenny Wallace, along with short track legends Dick Trickle, Butch Miller, Mike Eddy, Bob Senneker, Steve Grissom, and Bobby Gill.

With General Motors stepping up its commitment to ACT in 1989, the GM Motorsport National Stock Car Series was formed in Canada, offering large purses, even larger point funds, and coast-to-coast television coverage. Budweiser created the Bud Triple Crown as part of the GM Series, and paid Junior Hanley over $50,000 in 1991 and again in 1992 for sweeping the series. During Hanley’s ACT Championship years from 1991–93, the Ontario driver earned more than $700,000 in winnings.

The American-Canadian Tour Late Models use a standardized racing program designed to manage costs and encourage competitive racing. Established in 1992 and becoming the tour's primary division in 1996, this format has introduced several structural concepts later adopted by other North American short track racing series.

ACT developed one of the first “spec” engine programs in 1999 as a cost-saving option for local and regional racers. After successful testing in the early 2000s, most teams, tracks and promoters both regionally and nationally have made the switch. The “spec” engine program expanded to include a Ford option in 2010 and added the popular GM ‘602’ in 2018. A similar cost-saving “spec” program exists with Koni and QA1 shock absorbers as well as a uniform Hoosier Racing Tire utilized by the Tour and its partner tracks.

For their efforts in the growth of stock car racing, both Squier and Curley have been inducted into the New England Auto Racers Hall of Fame and the Vermont Sports Hall of Fame. In 2004, ACT founder Tom Curley was voted by more than 1,000 race promoters across the continent as the Auto Racing Promoter of the Year. In 2018 Ken Squier was ceremoniously inducted into the NASCAR Hall of Fame in Charlotte, North Carolina for his contributions to the growth of the sport on a national, and international, level. ACT lost its leader in May of 2017 when a decades-long battle with COPD claimed Tom Curley. Ken Squier died in November 2023 after battling multiple health problems for several years.

== The modern era ==
In November 2017, the American-Canadian Tour changed ownership for the first time in its storied history as former racer Cris Michaud and Vermont businessman Pat Malone took charge of the sanctioning body after partnering to purchase Vermont’s Thunder Road earlier that season. The partnership also purchased New Hampshire’s White Mountain Motorsports Park in 2019. In recent years ACT has competed at tracks across New England, Quebec, Virginia, North Carolina and Florida. Partnering with the Maine-based Pro All Stars Series (PASS), the two sanctioning bodies have co-promoted events at Thompson Speedway (CT) since 2020.

During the 2023 season, ACT fans saw some of the greatest competition in the Northeast. The American-Canadian Tour averaged 33.3 cars per event in 2023 with a season-high 49 teams attempting to qualify for the season-ending event at Connecticut's Waterford Speedbowl in October. There was plenty of action leading up to the end.

After winning in a March exhibition run at North Carolina’s Hickory Motor Speedway, Derek Gluchacki successfully defended his Northeast Classic victory at New Hampshire Motor Speedway by just 0.060-seconds ahead of fellow Bay Stater Tom Carey III. The 25th annual Community Bank 150 at Thunder Road featured the most lead changes of the season at 13 as three-time 'King of the Road' Jason Corliss battled up from a 17th-place starting position to take the home-cooking win.

The sixth annual Milton CAT Midsummer Classic 250 again wowed as 42 cars were whittled down to a 31-car starting field at White Mountain Motorsports Park that saw Last Chance winner Jesse Switser do the impossible and take down the victory! Switser joined Gabe Brown and Brandon Barker as first-time American-Canadian Tour winners in 2023.

Competitors, officials, and fans alike eagerly awaited the 2024 season. In its 46th consecutive year, the ACT Tour featured thirteen point-counting events in New England and Quebec with highlights that include at least eight events worth $5,000-or-more to win and joining the region’s biggest weekends, including the 51st Oxford 250, the 62nd Vermont Milk Bowl and the Sunoco World Series.

ACT-sanctioned racing can also be found at Thunder Road International SpeedBowl (VT), White Mountain Motorsports Park (NH) and Thompson Speedway Motorsports Park (CT) along with the touring Serie ACT Quebec in Canada and the US-Based ACT Tri-State Flying Tiger Series.

ACT introduced ACT Sportsman Quebec in 2025, which will race exclusively at Autodrome Montmagny.

== American-Canadian Tour Champions (1979-present) ==
| Year | Champion | Hometown | Tour Name | Starts | Wins | Top 5s | Top 10s |
|---|---|---|---|---|---|---|---|
| 1979 | Harmon 'Beaver' Dragon | Milton, VT | North Tour | 27 | 9 | 23 | 24 |
| 1980 | Harmon 'Beaver' Dragon | Milton, VT | North Tour | 25 | 3 | 18 | 21 |
| 1981 | Dick McCabe | Kennebunkport, ME | Molson Tour | 27 | 7 | 19 | 23 |
| 1982 | Dick McCabe | Kennebunkport, ME | Molson Tour | 33 | 8 | 25 | 31 |
| 1983 | Robbie Crouch | Tampa, FL | Stroh's Tour | 27 | 8 | 17 | 19 |
| 1984 | Robbie Crouch | Tampa, FL | Stroh's Tour | 29 | 5 | 13 | 21 |
| 1985 | Randy LaJoie (Note: LaJoie was not awarded the 1985 title until 1988; that year, a lawsuit regarding an official's decision in a race at Catamount Speedway, filled by championship rival Robbie Crouch (Crouch v. Natl Ass’n for Stock Car Auto Racing, Inc.), was ruled in favor of NASCAR.) | Norwalk, CT | Coors Tour | 30 | 5 | 21 | 25 |
| 1986 | Robbie Crouch | Tampa, FL | ACT Coors Tour | 27 | 10 | 20 | 22 |
| 1987 | Robbie Crouch | Tampa, FL | ACT Coors Tour | 20 | 5 | 13 | 14 |
| 1988 | Robbie Crouch | Tampa, FL | ACT Coors Tour | 21 | 11 | 14 | 15 |
| 1989 | Russ Urlin | London, ON | ACT Coors Tour | 21 | 7 | 19 | 21 |
| 1990 | Robbie Crouch | Tampa, FL | ACT Coors Tour | 22 | 4 | 14 | 17 |
| 1991 | Junior Hanley | Oakville, ON | American-Canadian Tour | 21 | 7 | 12 | 16 |
| 1992 | Junior Hanley | Oakville, ON | American-Canadian Tour | 23 | 10 | 16 | 19 |
| | Dave Whitcomb | Essex Junction, VT | ACT LMS Series | 8 | 1 | 4 | 5 |
| 1993 | Junior Hanley | Oakville, ON | ACT GM Goodwrench Tour | 21 | 12 | 16 | 17 |
| | Brian Hoar | Willison, VT | ACT LMS Series | 6 | 3 | 4 | 6 |
| 1994 | Mike Rowe | Turner, ME | American-Canadian Tour | 16 | 4 | 10 | 13 |
| | Jean-Paul Cyr | Milton, VT | ACT LMS Series | 6 | 1 | 3 | 5 |
| 1995 | Brad Leighton | Center Harbor, NH | American-Canadian Tour | 17 | 7 | 8 | 14 |
| | Lance Ferno | Williamstown, VT | ACT LMS Series | 7 | 1 | 4 | 7 |
| 1996 | Jean-Paul Cyr | Milton, VT | American-Canadian Tour | 8 | 2 | 5 | 5 |
| 1997 | Brian Hoar | Williston, VT | ACT Texaco-Havoline Series | 8 | 2 | 6 | 6 |
| 1998 | Brian Hoar | Williston, VT | ACT Texaco-Havoline Series | 9 | 4 | 6 | 7 |
| 1999 | Brian Hoar | Williston, VT | American-Canadian Tour | 13 | 5 | 8 | 10 |
| 2000 | Brian Hoar | Williston, VT | American-Canadian Tour | 12 | 3 | 8 | 11 |
| 2001 | Pete Fecteau | Morrisville, VT | ACT Dodge Tour | 13 | 2 | 7 | 9 |
| 2002 | Phil Scott | Montpelier, VT | ACT Dodge Tour | 16 | 0 | 9 | 14 |
| 2003 | Jean-Paul Cyr | Milton, VT | ACT Dodge Tour | 16 | 4 | 11 | 12 |
| 2004 | Jean-Paul Cyr | Milton, VT | ACT Dodge Tour | 14 | 2 | 8 | 10 |
| 2005 | Jean-Paul Cyr | Milton, VT | American-Canadian Tour | 10 | 4 | 6 | 9 |
| 2006 | Jean-Paul Cyr | Milton, VT | American-Canadian Tour | 11 | 2 | 6 | 8 |
| 2007 | Jean-Paul Cyr | Milton, VT | American-Canadian Tour | 13 | 0 | 9 | 11 |
| 2008 | Patrick Laperle | St-Denis, QC | American-Canadian Tour | 12 | 3 | 8 | 10 |
| 2009 | Brian Hoar | Williston, VT | American-Canadian Tour | 13 | 2 | 8 | 11 |
| 2010 | Brian Hoar | Williston, VT | American-Canadian Tour | 13 | 3 | 10 | 13 |
| 2011 | Brian Hoar | Williston, VT | American-Canadian Tour | 12 | 5 | 9 | 11 |
| 2012 | Wayne Helliwell Jr | Dover, NH | American-Canadian Tour | 10 | 4 | 7 | 9 |
| 2013 | Wayne Helliwell Jr | Dover, NH | American-Canadian Tour | 14 | 2 | 10 | 13 |
| 2014 | Joey Polewarczyk | Hudson, NH | American-Canadian Tour | 9 | 2 | 9 | 9 |
| 2015 | Wayne Helliwell Jr | Dover, NH | American-Canadian Tour | 13 | 4 | 10 | 13 |
| 2016 | Nick Sweet | Barre, VT | American-Canadian Tour | 13 | 3 | 9 | 11 |
| 2017 | Scott Payea | Milton, VT | American-Canadian Tour | 9 | 5 | 8 | 9 |
| 2018 | Scott Payea | Milton, VT | American-Canadian Tour | 10 | 2 | 8 | 10 |
| 2019 | Rich Dubeau | Plainfield, NH | American-Canadian Tour | 10 | 2 | 8 | 9 |
| 2020 | Jimmy Hebert | Williamstown, VT | American-Canadian Tour | 9 | 2 | 7 | 9 |
| 2021 | Ben Rowe | Turner, ME | American-Canadian Tour | 12 | 1 | 6 | 11 |
| 2022 | D.J. Shaw | Center Conway, NH | American-Canadian Tour | 13 | 3 | 11 | 13 |
| 2023 | D.J. Shaw | Center Conway, NH | American-Canadian Tour | 13 | 2 | 7 | 13 |
| 2024 | Gabe Brown | Center Conway, NH | American-Canadian Tour | 13 | 1 | 8 | 10 |

== Série ACT Quebec ==
After a five year hiatus, partially due to the COVID-19 pandemic and subsequent international border closure, the Serie ACT Quebec series returned in 2023 for a 10-race schedule. Split evenly between Quebec bullrings Autodrome Chaudiere and Autodrome Montmagny, Serie ACT Quebec brought a permanent presence back to Canada for the ACT sanctioning body. Raphaël Lessard took the 2023 championship for the renowned Larue Raceteam #48QC with several new drivers earning their first ACT-sanctioned victories on the reborn Canadian circuit

| Year | Champion | Hometown | Races |
|---|---|---|---|
| 2007 | Patrick Laperle | St-Denis, QC | 12 |
| 2008 | Alexandre Gingras | Val-Belair, QC | 8 |
| 2009 | Donald Theetge | Boischatel, QC | 9 |
| 2010 | Karl Allard | Levis, QC | 11 |
| 2011 | Patrick Laperle | St-Denis, QC | 12 |
| 2012 | Patrick Laperle | St-Denis, QC | 12 |
| 2013 | Jean-François Déry | Quebec City, QC | 11 |
| 2014 | Alex Labbé | St-Albert, QC | 8 |
| 2015 | Dany Trepanier | St-Edouard, QC | 12 |
| 2016 | Patrick Laperle | St-Denis, QC | 8 |
| 2017 | Jonathan Bouvrette | Blainville, QC | 6 |
| 2023 | Raphaël Lessard | St-Joseph, QC | 10 |
| 2024 | Raphaël Lessard | St-Joseph, QC | 12 |

== 2025 American-Canadian Tour Schedule ==
| Date | Track | Location | Winner |
|---|---|---|---|
| April 13 | New Hampshire Motor Speedway | Loudon, New Hampshire | Gabe Brown |
| April 26 | Oxford Plains Speedway | Oxford, Maine | Postponed event |
| May 4 | Thunder Road International SpeedBowl | Barre, Vermont | Kaiden Fisher |
| May 11 | Star Speedway | Epping, New Hampshire | Brandon Barker |
| June 7 | White Mountain Motorsports Park | North Woodstock, New Hampshire | Raphaël Lessard |
| June 21 | Autodrome Chaudière | Vallée-Jonction, Quebec | Alexendre Tardif |
| June 25 | Seekonk Speedway | Seekonk, Massachusetts | Derek Gluchacki |
| July 5 | Circuit Riverside Speedway Ste-Croix | Sainte-Croix, Quebec | Postponed event |
| July 19 | Autodrome Montmagny | Montmagny, Quebec | Jeff Cote |
| August 2 | White Mountain Motorsports Park | North Woodstock, New Hampshire | Raphaël Lessard |
| August 23 | Oxford Plains Speedway | Oxford, Maine | Jimmy Renfrew Jr. |
| August 31 | Thunder Road International SpeedBowl | Barre, Vermont | Jason Corliss |
| September 13 | White Mountain Motorsports Park | North Woodstock, New Hampshire | Gabe Brown |
| October 5 (Note: Vermont Milk Bowl, event does not count towards championship) | Thunder Road International SpeedBowl | Barre, Vermont | Marcel J. Gravel |
| October 25 | Seekonk Speedway | Seekonk, Massachusetts | Erick Sands |

== 2025 Série ACT Quebec Schedule ==
| Date | Track | Location | Winner |
|---|---|---|---|
| May 10 | Autodrome Chaudière | Vallée-Jonction, Quebec | |
| May 24 | Autodrome Montmagny | Montmagny, Quebec | |
| June 14 | Autodrome Montmagny | Montmagny, Quebec | |
| June 21 | Autodrome Chaudière | Vallée-Jonction, Quebec | |
| June 28 | Autodrome Montmagny | Montmagny, Quebec | |
| July 12 | Autodrome Chaudière | Vallée-Jonction, Quebec | |
| July 19 | Autodrome Montmagny | Montmagny, Quebec | |
| July 26 | Autodrome Chaudière | Vallée-Jonction, Quebec | |
| August 9 | Autodrome Chaudière | Vallée-Jonction, Quebec | |
| August 16 | Autodrome Montmagny | Montmagny, Quebec | |
| September 6 | Autodrome Chaudière | Vallée-Jonction, Quebec | |
| September 20 | Autodrome Montmagny | Montmagny, Quebec | |

== 2025 ACT Sportsman Quebec Schedule ==
| Date | Track | Location | Winner |
|---|---|---|---|
| May 24 | Autodrome Montmagny | Montmagny, Quebec | |
| June 14 | Autodrome Montmagny | Montmagny, Quebec | |
| June 28 | Autodrome Montmagny | Montmagny, Quebec | |
| July 19 | Autodrome Montmagny | Montmagny, Quebec | |
| August 16 | Autodrome Montmagny | Montmagny, Quebec | |
| September 20 | Autodrome Montmagny | Montmagny, Quebec | |

== See also ==
- ASA
- ASA Midwest Tour
- CRA
- CRA Super Series
- CARS Tour
- Pro All Stars Series
- SRL Southwest Tour
- NASCAR
- ARCA Menards Series East
- CASCAR Super Series
- NASCAR Canada Series
- List of NASCAR series
