= Supermodified racing =

Class of open-wheel race car

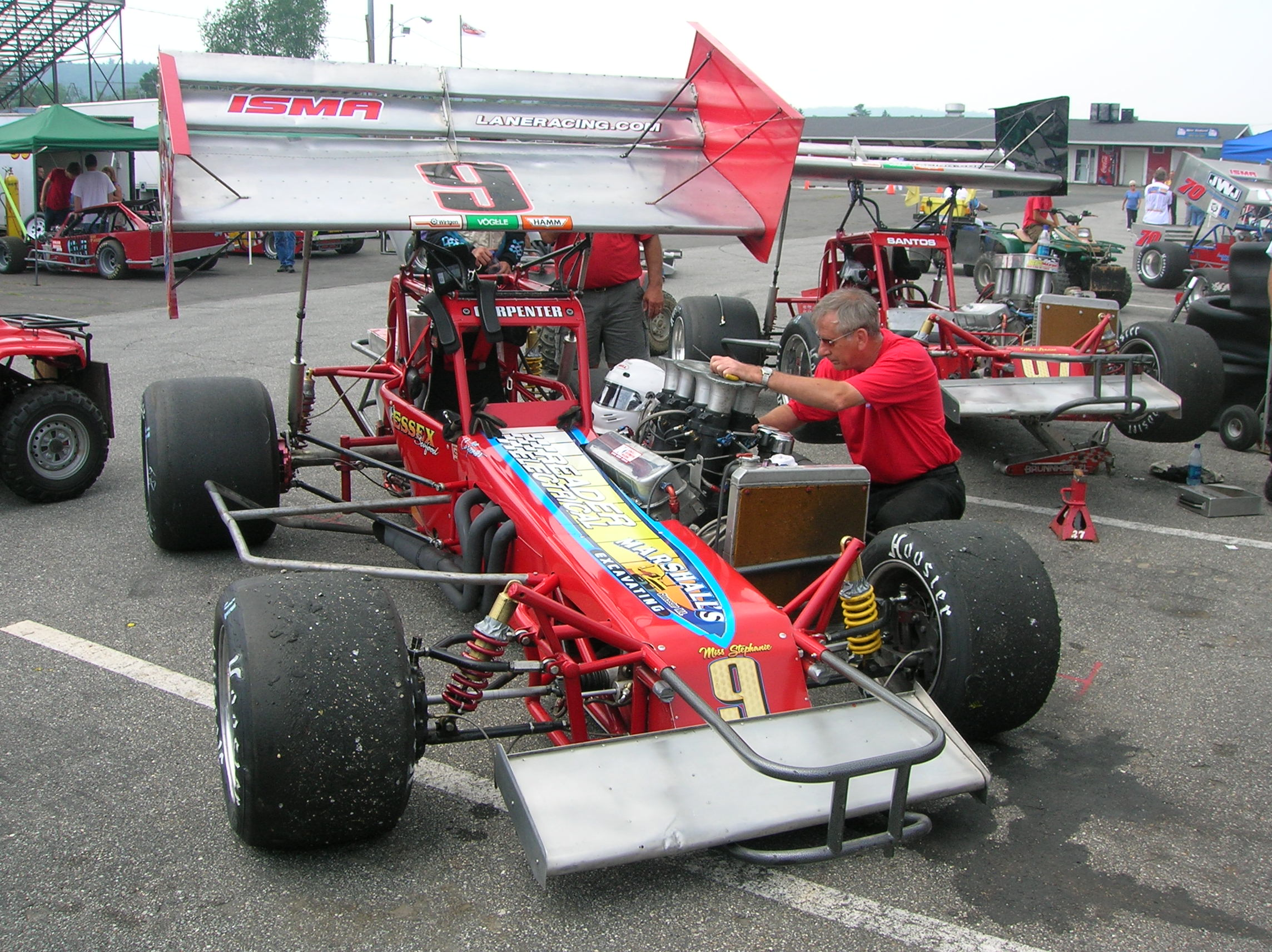
An ISMA supermodified. Note the extreme weight offset and the engine mounted outside of the central frame rails.

Supermodifieds are a class of open wheel race car that compete on paved short tracks throughout North America. The class was founded in the 1950s and is especially popular in the Western, Northeast, and Great Lakes regions. Supermodifieds have been called the fastest short track race cars in the world.

== Design ==
The frame of a supermodified is generally constructed from aircraft-quality 0.095-inch (2.4 mm) thick chromium-molybdenum ("chromoly") tubing with steel and aluminum components, and the body is fabricated from fiberglass and aluminum. The cars are powered by American fuel-injected V8 engines that run on methanol fuel and can produce in excess of 900 hp (670 kW). At a weight of around 1,850 pounds (840 kg), the cars achieve an enormous power-to-weight ratio.

Nearly all competitors on the West Coast choose to run aluminum small blocks ranging from 410 to 430 cubic inches (6.7 to 7.0 L), whereas East Coast cars run mandatory cast-iron big blocks with aluminum heads bored to the allowable maximum displacement of 468 cu in (7.7 L). Cars in the Midwest can run small blocks up to 412 cu in (6.8 L) or big blocks up to 481 cu in (7.9 L). Separate classes of supermodifieds utilizing small block 350 cu in (5.7 L) engines also run on the East Coast (e.g. at Oswego Speedway).

Modern era big-block supermodifieds use a radically offset chassis that is up to 18 inches (460 mm) to the left of center. The engine and drivetrain components are mounted in a specially-fabricated area placed outside the left side frame rails. The engine is thus a stressed member of the chassis. This allows weight distribution to favor the left side (often by as much as 70%) and thereby aid cornering around the left-hand turns of an oval track. The giant wings, generally a maximum of 24 sq ft (2.2 m^{2})' in area, are mounted on the frame in a manner resembling sprint cars and serve a similar purpose, designed to produce downforce and thus increase cornering capabilities at high speed. West Coast (ERA/SMRA) cars run a fixed wing, whereas East Coast (ISMA/MSS) cars generally run a wing mounted to the suspension or chassis by pneumatic struts. The racing slick tires used on supermodifieds are among the widest used in pavement oval racing.

Like sprint cars, supermodifieds do not have starters, batteries, or transmissions, and are push-started.

The combination of high power, light weight, and high cornering ability allows supermodifieds to average over 120 mph (190 km/h) on a 1/2-mile oval and 150 mph (240 km/h) on a 1-mile (1.6 km) oval, with top speeds over 190 mph (310 km/h).

== Sanctioning bodies ==
=== ISMA ===
The largest of the four major sanctioning bodies is the Liverpool, New York-based International Supermodified Association (ISMA), founded in 1974 by multi-time Oswego Speedway champions Jim Shampine and Nolan Swift to ensure the future of supermodified racing. With the help of local businessman Tom Heveron, they formed ISMA as a forum for owners and drivers to express their ideas and opinions as they felt that they were not allowed to do so under Oswego Speedway management. Their goals were to upgrade supermodified racing with better safety conditions, hold more events per season to insure sufficient purses, and aid drivers with race-related issues. The association worked with track management in making decisions and in discussing ways of improvement. The club encouraged new drivers and owners, involved other tracks in supermodified racing, and helped to make the division stronger and more well known to a wider audience.

As president, Heveron, with the help of Vice President Jim Shampine and Secretary/Treasurer Fred Graves, led ISMA through its developmental stages. ISMA negotiated with Lancaster National Speedway for a 40-lap race held on July 3, 1974, which Todd Gibson of Richwood, Ohio won. The following year, ISMA booked races at Fulton Speedway with a $5,000 purse and $1,000 to win.

Starting in 1976, ISMA developed a point fund with tracks contributing $500–$1,000 per race to this fund. Unlike most other point systems, ISMA awards points to the car owners, as ISMA is an owners' club rather than a drivers' club. Joining Heveron, Shampine, and Graves, Shirley Letcher assumed responsibility for the point system. In just three seasons, ISMA had accomplished sanctioning over $96,000 in purse money and races, adding a point fund of $4,400 paid by promoters, having tow money at all of the ISMA sanctioned races, having insurance certificates from each promoter on file, and working with other promoters for more races in 1977. With races at Fulton Speedway, Delaware Speedway, Star Speedway, Flamboro Speedway, and Thompson Speedway, Steve Gioia Jr. became ISMA's first points champion.

ISMA pioneered the franchise system, in which teams purchase a franchise at the beginning of the season. Creating a mutually beneficial situation for both teams and promoters, each of the 19 franchise teams are allowed to miss up to 3 shows during the race season while being guaranteed a minimum starting purse of $1,000 at each event.

ISMA has generally sanctioned between 13 and 17 shows a year. Major events on the ISMA schedule have included leg one of the "supermodified Triple Crown", the Hy-Miler Supermodified Nationals held annually at Sandusky Speedway since 1978, and leg three of the Triple Crown, the Star Classic 150 held at Star Speedway for over 40 years. Races have also been run at other tracks across the Northeast and Midwest, including Delaware Speedway in Ontario, Canada.

In 2023, ISMA merged with the Midwest Supermodified Series (MSS; see below). In 2024, ISMA/MSS scheduled events in the states of New York, Ohio, Michigan, New Hampshire, and North Carolina.

The cars in this series use wings that are designed to move with the airflow over the car, lying almost level with the ground on straights and standing up in turns to increase downforce. The only engine allowed by ISMA is a cast-iron big block with a maximum displacement of 468 cu in (7.7 L). Aluminum heads are allowed. The cars must weigh at least 1,850 lb (840 kg) post-race.

Notable ISMA competitors, past and present, include Russ Wood (eight championships), Chris Perley (six championships), Bentley Warren (four championships), Doug Heveron (four championships), Steve Gioia Jr. (four championships), Pat Abold (three championships), Joe Gosek (two championships), and Mike Ordway Sr. (two championships). Canadian champions include Dave McKnight Jr. (2001) and Mike Lichty (2012 & 2019). As of the end of the 2023 season, the top five drivers for all-time ISMA feature wins are Perley (74), Wood (54), Warren (45), Ordway Sr. (36) and Gosek (30).

=== MSS ===
Established in 2001, the Sandusky, Ohio-based Midwest Supermodified Series (MSS; formerly the Midwest Supermodified Association or MSA) ran primarily in Ohio. MSS drivers frequently took part in ISMA races and vice versa. MSS merged with ISMA in 2023 (see above).

Notable MSS champions include Tim Jedrzejek (2002, 2003, 2004, 2008 and 2009), Trent Stephens (2011, 2012, 2013 and 2014), and Dave Shullick Jr. (2005, 2006 and 2007). Shullick Jr. has also won two ISMA championships (2015 and 2016) and three Oswego Speedway championships (2017, 2021 and 2023).

=== SMRA ===
The Super Modified Racing Association (SMRA) governed supermodified racing in the Western United States during 2008–2011. The SMRA grew from the defunct Western States Supermodified Racing League (WSSRL), which ran one season in 2007 at tracks in Arizona, California, Idaho, Utah and Washington before disbanding. Of these tracks, only Rocky Mountain Raceway in Utah and Madera Speedway in California have returned, with a third track, Magic Valley Speedway in Idaho, making up the 2008 SMRA schedule.

The SMRA had a much more liberal rule book than its eastern counterparts, with fewer restrictions on engine placement (rear-engine cars were universally banned in the 1980s) and allowing other such advancements as independent suspension.

The SMRA ceased operations in early 2011 and no sanctioning currently exists in California. Nearly half the races scheduled for 2011 were cancelled due to a shortage of entries.

=== ERA ===
The oldest of the four sanctioning bodies for supermodified racing is the Colorado-only Englewood Racing Association, which was formed in 1965 at Englewood Speedway. That track closed in 1979 and following its closure, the series ran a 9-race schedule, all of which were run at Colorado National Speedway (CNS) in Dacono until May 29, 2016.

A technical inspection for the May 29th race revealed that one car in the Supermodified class had an incorrect muffler installed. This did not offer a competitive advantage and the car was allowed to run by CNS, but the correct muffler would have to be installed if the car wanted to compete on a future race date. The ERA's supermodified club, however, intended to disqualify it or leave the race, a move which would cost them the rest of their races at CNS for the 2016 season. After a number of club members left in protest, CNS removed the supermodified division from the 2016 schedule. Following this disagreement, there have been very few supermodified races at CNS.

ERA supermodifieds now primarily race at I-25 Speedway, a 1/4-mile high-banked asphalt oval in Pueblo. Some regular Colorado ERA supermodified drivers have raced their cars at the Meridian Speedway in Idaho in non-ERA-sanctioned races.
