= Jean-Paul Cabana =

Canadian race car driver

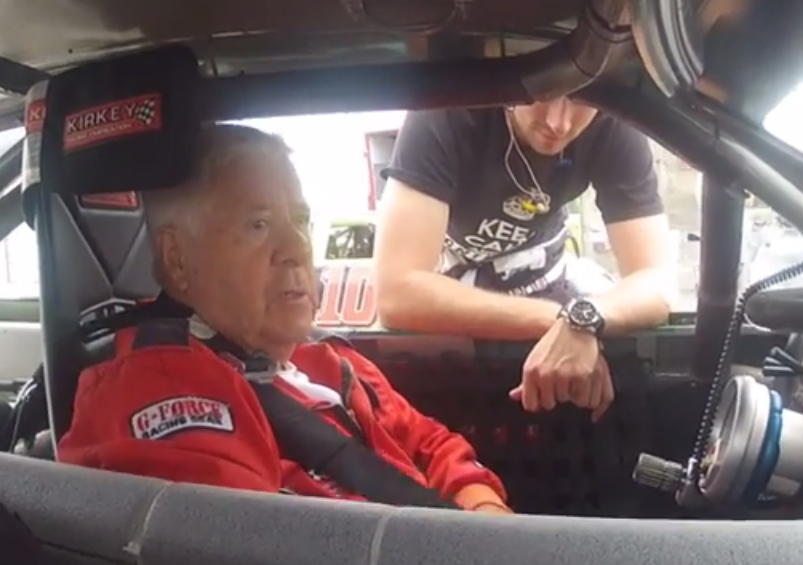

Jean-Paul Cabana from Saint-Hyacinthe, Quebec, is a Canadian race car driver. He is considered the King of Stock Car Racing in Quebec and was inducted into the Canadian Motorsport Hall of Fame in 2001 and into the New England Auto Racers Hall of Fame in 2007.

Cabana was a two-time winner of the "Milk Bowl" race at Thunder Road International Speedbowl, in 1973 and 1987, track champion at Thunder Road in 1971 and 1980 and track champion at Catamount Stadium, Vermont, in 1971 and 1974.

He had 25 wins in the ACT Pro Stock Tour between 1981 and 1990.
