= Jean-François Déry =

Canadian engineer

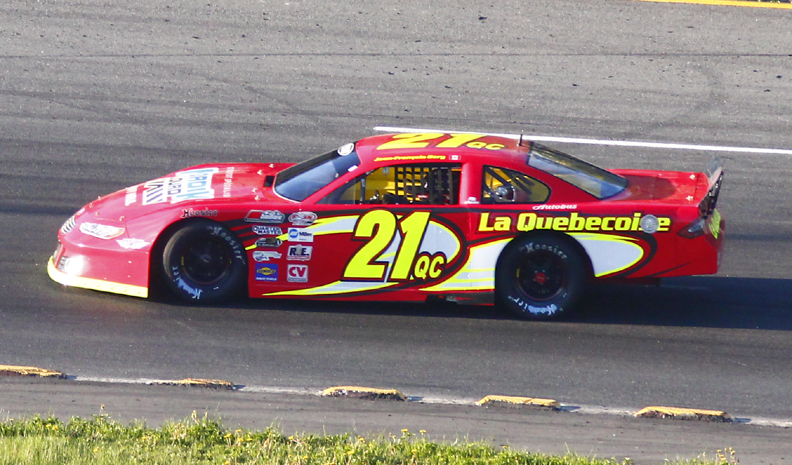
- Déry at Autodrome Chaudière in 2013.
- Nationality: (Canada) Canadian
- Born: August 5, 1974 (age 52) Quebec, Canada

Série ACT career
- Debut season: 1990's
- Car number: 21

Jean-François Déry (born August 5, 1974) is a Canadian racing driver. He competes in the Quebec's ACT Series and in the PASS North Series.

Born in Quebec, Canada, Déry was champion of the Quebec's ACT Series in 2013 and vice-champion in 2012. He won seven races in the Quebec's ACT Series and one in the former Série nationale Castrol LMS Québec.

He won the Late Model race at the Grand Prix de Trois-Rivières in 2004 and the first ever Late Model race at Autodrome Chaudière in 2005.
