= Bentley Warren =

American racecar driver (born 1940)

Bentley Warren (born December 10, 1940) is an American racecar driver. He is best known for racing in the USAC Championship Car series, and for some New Englanders, even more so for his racing in the Supermodified winged cars, now called ISMA. During the 1970s, he twice raced in the Indianapolis 500.

== Biography ==
Warren had his first win 1957 at West Peabody, Massachusetts. As of 2007, he had won races at 34 tracks in the United States and Canada. His first championship came in 1962 in the B-class at Hudson and the Pines. Since then, he has won championships at Oswego Speedway, Star Speedway, New England Super Modified Racing Association and ISMA.

Warren raced in the 1970–1975 seasons, with 37 career starts, including the Indianapolis 500 races of 1971 and 1975. He finished in the top-ten 14 times, with his best finish in fourth position in 1970 at Milwaukee.

After he stopped racing in the Indy cars, Warren's career was revitalized at Oswego Speedway, driving for Tom Heveron in a wingless supermodified. While subbing for injured driver Doug Heveron, Warren racked up five wins in his first six starts which led to a series of great rides including the Flying 5 and one of Paul Dunigan's fleet. Bentley has won the International Classic at Oswego six times.

Other notable wins include the Little 500 twice, the Copper World Classic, the Star Classic, The Thompson World Series, and an east–west showdown between the best of the supermodified drivers. He continues to drive on occasion in the ISMA supermodified series and recorded a win in 2006 driving for car owner Vic Miller.

In the early 2000s, Warren worked with actor Paul Newman in a midget car and supermodified at Star Speedway in Epping, New Hampshire. In the late 1990s and in the 2000s, Warren dabbled back in the USAC open-wheel division, and continued to make appearances in supermodifieds.

Later on, sometime around 2007, Warren's Campground and Biker Saloon were constructed in Arundel, Maine, serving as a tourism site and recreational haven.

== Career awards ==
- He was inducted in the New England Auto Racers Hall of Fame in 2007.

=== Indy 500 results ===
Year	Chassis	Engine	Start	Finish
1970	Finley	Offy	Practice Crash	
1971	Eagle	Offy	15th	23rd
1972	Eagle	Offy	Failed to Qualify	
1973	Eagle	Offy	Failed to Qualify	
1974	Finley	Offy	Failed to Qualify	
1975	King	Offy	17th	23rd
