= Jean-Paul Cyr =

American stock car racing driver

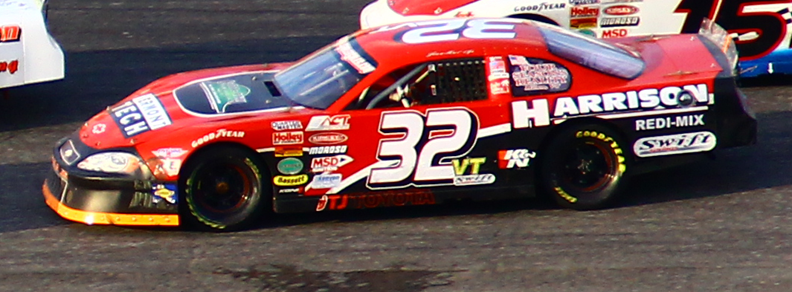
- Cyr at Circuit Riverside Speedway Ste-Croix in 2011
- Nationality: (United States) American
- Born: December 8, 1965 (age 60) Milton, Vermont, U.S.

ACT Late Model Tour career
- Debut season: 1984
- Car number: 32
- Starts: 173
- Wins: 19
- Best finish: 1st in 1994, 1996, 2003, 2004, 2005, 2006, 2007

Championship titles
- 1994, 1996, 2003, 2004, 2005, 2006, 2007: ACT Late Model Tour

Jean-Paul Cyr (born December 8, 1965, in Milton, Vermont, United States) is an American racing driver. He competes in the American Canadian Tour.

Cyr is a seven-time champion of the ACT Tour, having won the title in 1994, 1996, 2003, 2004, 2005, 2006 and 2007. He won 19 races in the ACT Tour.

Cyr competed in NASCAR Whelen Modified Tour from 1998 to 2000, posting a best finish of fifth at Richmond International Raceway in 1999.
