= South Alabama Speedway =

Racetrack in Kinston, Alabama

31.2416120°N 86.1873170°W

South Alabama Speedway is a 4/10 mile asphalt oval located in Kinston, Alabama, it is known for hosting the Rattler 250, one of the biggest late model races in America.

== History ==
South Alabama Speedway opened in 1973 as Twin City Speedway as a 1/2 mile oval, with drivers such as Neil Bonnett, David Pearson, Pete Hamilton, Rusty Wallace, and Darrell Waltrip, having all raced at the venue throughout its history, in 1978, the track was bought by Johnny Williams, to which the track was renamed to South Alabama Motor Speedway, after the 1982 Rattler 100, the track closed, but was then bought in 1984 by Lamar Hallford and David Lummus, the track also held All-American Challenge Series races in 1985 and got remodeled in 1989, John Dykes and Henry Holley purchased the speedway in December 1997, and the track has continued to grow strong since.

== Events ==
=== Rattler 250 ===
The Rattler 250 is a late model event that has been held at the venue since 1984, originally the Rattler 100, it eventually became the Rattler 250 sometime in the 2000s-2010s, and is considered one of the most prestigious late model races in the country. Many drivers in NASCAR have won the Rattler 250, most notably Ty Majeski, who has won the event a record six times. Other winners include Chase Elliott in 2011, Grant Enfinger in 2008 and 2011, Christopher Bell in 2015, and Harrison Burton in 2018.

=== Weekly racing ===
Just like most short tracks in America, South Alabama Speedway has weekly racing, the track has Super Stock, Modified, Roadrunner, Coyote, Crown Vic, Mini Cup, and Mini Sportsman divisions that run from March to October.
