= Star Speedway =

Race track in the U.S. state of New Hampshire

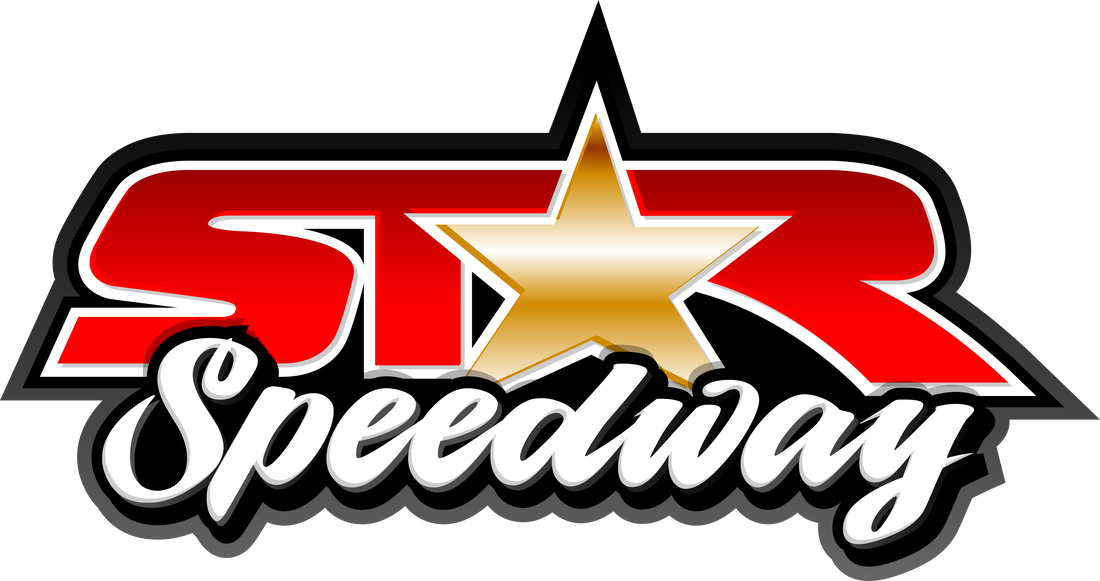
- Logo used since 2020
- Location: 176 Exeter Road; Epping, New Hampshire
- Coordinates: 43°01′45″N 71°02′26″W
- Operator: Webber family (2011–present)
- Opened: 1966
- Major events: Current: American Canadian Tour (1985, 2013, 2019, 2024–present); International Supermodified Association; Star Classic; Former: NASCAR Busch North Series (1987–2001); NASCAR Whelen Modified Tour (1985–1987, 1990)
- Website: www.starspeedwaynh.com

Oval (1966–present)
- Surface: Asphalt
- Length: 0.250 mi (0.402 km)
- Banking: Semi-banked

Star Speedway is a short-track oval race track located in Epping, New Hampshire. It hosts a tour-type modified stock car racing division under the management of the Webber family.

== History ==
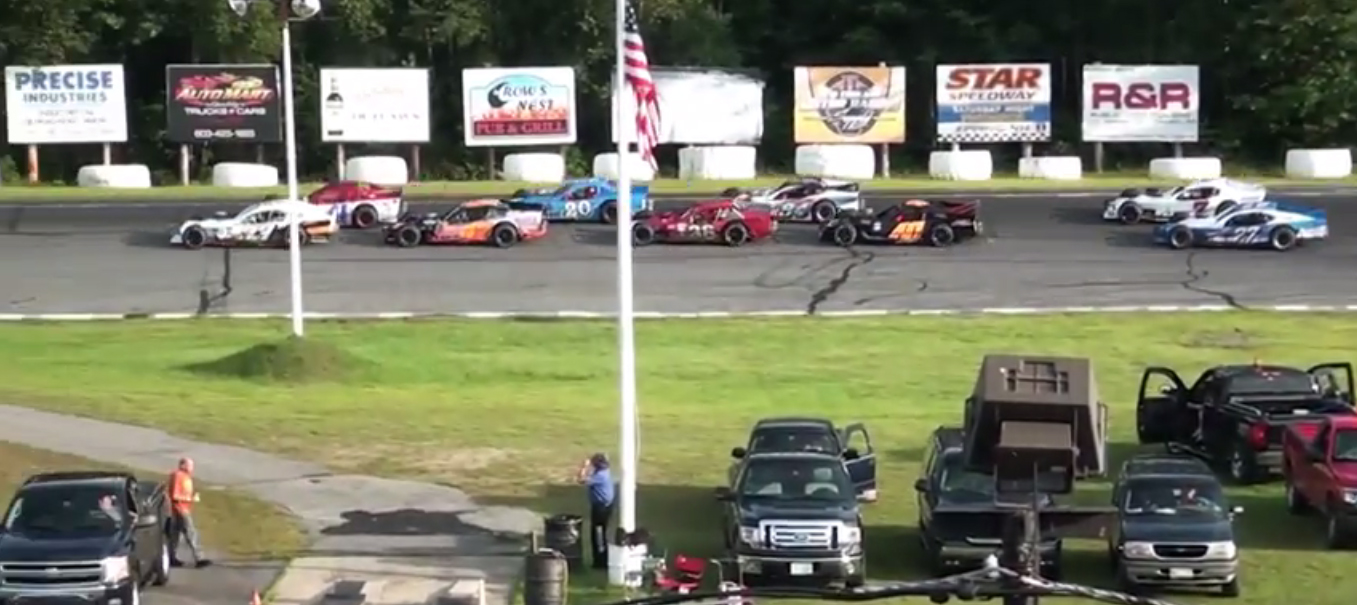
A race on Star Speedway in August 2014

Star Speedway opened in 1966, having been primarily built by Charlie Elliot, a contractor, restaurant owner, and car enthusiast from nearby Dover, New Hampshire. The prior year, Elliot had gone into business with Kendall C. Smith and local journalist Russ Conway to build a race track on what had formerly been Star Brick Yard in Epping, New Hampshire. Elliot, Smith, and Conway sold their interests in the track by late 1983, when they purchased Lee Raceway (later known as Lee USA Speedway) in nearby Lee, New Hampshire.

The track has a long history of notable drivers, highlighted by Ollie Silva, a modified and supermodified standout who won features races from Canada to Florida with less-than-top equipment. In the 1970s, Star Speedway hosted modified and supermodified races weekly, and Silva's battles with "Big Daddy" Don McLaren, Eddie West, Jim Cheney, Dick Batchelder, and Paul Richardson. The speedway also held promotional races featuring some Boston Bruins players. It hosted what was then described to be the heaviest wedding cake in history, tipping the scales at over 700 pounds (320 kg).

Star Speedway hosted one NASCAR North Tour race in 1985. The track hosted 20 NASCAR Busch North Series events between 1987 and 2001, and four NASCAR Whelen Modified Tour events between 1985 and 1990.

== Since 2000 ==
The track struggled in the early years of the 21st century, often failing town inspection.

In 2008, Robert MacArthur took over the management, renamed the speedway "All-STAR", and promoted a very aggressive and diverse program including Supermodifieds, Modifieds and Late Models. Unfortunately, the promotion did not draw enough fans to be successful, leaving the track and promoter seriously in debt.

The track was closed for most of the 2010 season due to issues between track manager and promoter MacArthur and the town of Epping. The track was permitted by the town of Epping to be open for three days at the end of October, subject to the completion of required repairs to the facility.

The facility had two ACT Late Model Tour races, one in 2013 and the other in 2019.

The track hosts the Star Classic every fall, featuring the ISMA Super Modifieds. Drivers such as Chris Perley (the 2005 winner), Russ Wood, Mike Ordway and Indianapolis 500 veteran Bentley Warren have participated in the 200-lap race.

Owner Bob Webber has been operating the track since the departure of MacArthur and has made many improvements. Star Speedway currently hosts many popular touring series including PASS, ISMA, Granite State Pro Stock, Tri-Track modified and Northeast Classic Lites to name some. Star Speedway "sold out" an event in 2015, something never seen before in the modern era.

== See also ==
- New England Dragway, also located in Epping
