= Sandusky Speedway =

Coordinates: 41°25′37″N 82°42′33″W

- Location: Perkins Township, Erie County, near Sandusky, Ohio
- Owner: Don Arnold (leased to Kevin & Bev Jaycox)
- Operator: Kevin and Bev Jaycox
- Opened: 1950
- Major events: International Supermodified Association; ARCA Lincoln Welders Truck Series
- Website: http://sanduskyspeedway.com/

Oval
- Length: 0.8 km (0.50 mi)
- Banking: ?

Sandusky Speedway is a half-mile automobile race track located south of the city of Sandusky in Perkins Township, Erie County, Ohio, United States. The track features low banking in the turns and long straightaways. It has a layout similar to Martinsville Speedway.

Plans for a half-mile dirt track in Sandusky were first drawn up in 1948 by Tommy Warren. In 1950 the Lake Erie Stock Coupe Racing Association (LESCRA) purchased the land and the first race was held on May 14 of that year. Richard Brickly of Willard, Ohio won the race in a 1932 Ford coupe and received $103 in prizemoney.

The track was paved over in 1955 and a steel grandstand (replacing the old wooden stands) was added on the front straightaway, increasing the seating capacity from 3,500 to 5,000. The track was resurfaced in 2003.

Sandusky Speedway closed at the end of the 1969 season when the Decker family, then the current owners, elected to shut down the facility. It lay dormant for all of 1970 until a lease agreement was reached allowing the facility to re-open the following year. It has operated continuously since.

== History and affiliations ==
The speedway has enjoyed two brief affiliations with NASCAR in its history. Some NASCAR-sanctioned races were held at the track in 1952 and from 1987 to 1994, Sandusky Speedway ran events in what is now known as the Whelen All-American Series.

In 2008, the track hosted the ARCA Lincoln Welders Truck Series for the first time.

Sandusky Speedway hosted weekly competition in Spectator Stock (an entry level division with four- and six-cylinder passenger cars with automatic transmissions), Street Stock, Sportsman, Modified and Sprint Car classes until the 2012 season when the Spectator Stock division and Sportman division were removed from the weekly racing schedule. In 2012 the speed plant went to a 3 division line up which included the Modified Division, Street Stock division and either the Buckeye Super Sprints, Ohio Late Models, Main Event Racing Series or the Supermodifieds rotating on the schedule. The Main Event Super Late 'Outlaw' Bodied Series Championships XXVI (25) was held at the track after being held in Columbus in previous years.

2013 saw another shake up in the weekly racing schedule. Officials disbanded the Ohio Late Model series and added a Hobby Stock division, similar to the Spectator Stock division however without racing enhancements - keeping the cars stock and prohibiting racing tires, racing engine parts, any changes to the stock car parts, etc. During the season and a week before the 36th Annual Hy-Miler, weather hit the track hard with heavy rainfalls - once the rain had passed officials spent several days pumping water out of the turns, in-field, pits and parking area. It is estimated that 3.7 million gallons were pumped off the property.

It serves as an important hub for Supermodified racing, hosting an annual round of the International Supermodified Association (ISMA) as well as three rounds each year of the Midwest Supermodified Association (MSA) championship. The importance of this series is such that Oswego Speedway in New York - considered the home of Supermodified racing - is closed when the MSA races come to Sandusky. In turn, Sandusky Speedway closes on the weekend of the annual Oswego Classic.

== Track champions ==
- 1950 – George Fosco
