= Russ Conway (journalist) =

American journalist and writer (1949–2019)

- Conway in 1995
- Born: March 27, 1949; Haverhill, Massachusetts, U.S.
- Died: August 20, 2019 (aged 70); Haverhill, Massachusetts, U.S.
- Education: Northeastern University
- Occupations: Journalist, writer and auto racing promoter
- Years active: 1968–2006
- Employer: The Eagle-Tribune
- Known for: Investigative journalism
- Awards: Elmer Ferguson Memorial Award, New England Auto Racers Hall of Fame

Russell G. Conway (March 27, 1949 – August 20, 2019) was an American journalist, writer, and auto racing promoter. He worked in investigative journalism with The Eagle-Tribune, and wrote a series of articles and a book about Alan Eagleson and the mismanagement of funds, and National Hockey League players' pensions. He was nominated for the Pulitzer Prize in 1992, and honored with the Elmer Ferguson Memorial Award in 1999. He owned and operated several motorsport venues, and was inducted into the New England Auto Racers Hall of Fame.

== Early life ==
Conway was born on March 27, 1949, in Haverhill, Massachusetts. His father was a deputy fire chief, his mother was an educator, and he grew up in Haverhill. Conway was exposed to ice hockey and auto racing as a child, attending speedway races and a 1958 Stanley Cup Finals game with his father. He began delivering newspapers in 1959, and wrote racing column for the Haverhill Journal beginning in 1964. He later attended Northeastern University.

== Journalism career ==
Conway began writing for The Eagle-Tribune at age 18, and covered professional hockey from 1968. The first story he wrote exposed the poor conditions of the football team's locker room at Lawrence High School. Throughout his career, he has extensively covered the Boston Bruins.

In the latter 1970s, Conway published a series of articles on race-fixing at thoroughbred racing tracks in New England. The resulting Federal Bureau of Investigation (FBI) findings led to a federal grand jury, with several indictments, convictions, and sentences. He saw his work as civic duty, and received no compensation from the FBI, but did make friends which helped in his future research. He was promoted to sports editor position of The Eagle-Tribune in 1981.

In September 1991, he published a series of articles over a five-day period entitled Cracking the Ice: Intrigue and Conflict in the World of Big-time Hockey. The series focused on Alan Eagleson and the National Hockey League Players' Association (NHLPA), and made Conway a finalist for the 1992 Pulitzer Prize in beat reporting, for reporting on questionable business practices in the National Hockey League (NHL). He later collaborated with Bruce Dowbiggin on a second set of articles published in February 1993, after Dowbiggin had done his own investigations based on Conway's previous work. Conway's book on the subject, Game misconduct: Alan Eagleson and the Corruption of Hockey, was published in 1995.

Conway retired from The Eagle-Tribune in 2006.

=== Eagleson investigation ===
Conway began his investigation of Eagleson on June 5, 1990, after hearing complaints from members of the Bruins about their pensions, while at the 20th reunion for the 1970 Stanley Cup Finals victory. In the next 15 months, he made more than 1,600 telephone calls and 200 interviews, and reviewed over 150 documents. He compiled approximately 400 sources including NHL players; only six chose to remain confidential.

Conway investigated the five Canada Cup tournaments which Eagleson organized, and promised that profits would contribute to NHL player pensions for their participation. He discovered abnormally high expenses which deducted 75% of the gross event incomes, for unexplained services and management. He also exposed records of 40 players who attempted to collect disability insurance and found that Eagleson gave preferential treatment to his own clients, while others had to fight legal battles to collect money. Conway found two such extraordinary cases of former players who had to fight Eagleson. Ed Kea suffered a catastrophic injury in the minor leagues and was unable to collect because Eagleson let the insurance lapse without telling Kea. Andre Savard was also cheated out of $100,000 in disability payments and an additional $8,500 in legal fees from one of Eagleson's companies to collect. Conway discovered that Eagleson loaned over $3 million in NHLPA funds to friends or associates without notifying its executive or membership. He also found that the NHLPA was charged twice the normal rent by Eagleson for space in Toronto at his law office, and he leased more than the legal number of parking spots available.

After his series of articles was published, the FBI investigated and Eagleson faced 34 charges of fraud, racketeering, and embezzlement. The Royal Canadian Mounted Police charged Eagleson with six counts of fraud, and he served 18 months in a Canadian jail. He was disbarred in Canada, removed from the Order of Canada, and had to resign from the Hockey Hall of Fame. As a result of his work, the NHL and NHLPA agreed to paying $3 million each annually into the pension fund for ten years. Conway commented that players are now more aware and educated of their rights, as opposed to the owners and management dictating the terms.

== Car enthusiast ==
Conway owned 18 Chevrolet Corvettes in his lifetime. He was a business partner in operating three race tracks in New Hampshire from 1965 to 1989, and organized races and promoted races in Florida and Canada. He operated the Star Speedway in Epping, New Hampshire, and promoted and directed races at Star and two other New Hampshire tracks—Lee USA Speedway and Hudson Speedway.

== Honors and awards ==
Conway received the Elmer Ferguson Memorial Award in 1999, and was inducted into the media section of the Hockey Hall of Fame. He was inducted into the New England Auto Racers Hall of Fame in 2006. He received the Keith McCreary Seventh Man Award from the NHL Alumni Association in 2013 for his contributions to pensions and benefits for retired NHL players.

== Personal life ==
Conway was engaged five times but never married. He was an avid golfer, and organized the "Allen B. Rogers Memorial Golf Tournament" between 1975 and 2005 to raise money for "The Eagle-Tribune Santa Fund". He had residences in Haverhill, Massachusetts, Groveland, Massachusetts, Hampton Beach, New Hampshire, and Pompano Beach, Florida, at various times. He died from heart disease at his home in Haverhill, Massachusetts on August 20, 2019, at age 70.

== Bibliography ==
- Houston, William; Shoalts, David (1993). Eagleson: The Fall of a Hockey Czar. Whitby, Ontario: McGraw-Hill Ryerson Ltd. ISBN 0-07-551706-X.
