= Karl Allard =

Canadian racing driver

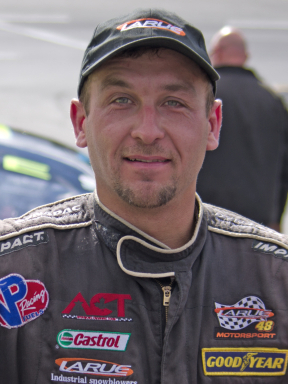
- Allard at Autodrome Chaudière in 2012
- Born: June 3, 1976 (age 50) Saint-Prime, Quebec, Canada

PASS North career
- Debut season: 1990's
- Car number: 12

Karl Allard (born June 3, 1976 in Saint-Prime, Quebec, Canada) is a Canadian racing driver. He competes in the PASS North Series and previously in the Quebec's ACT Series.

Champion of the Quebec's ACT Series in 2010 and of the Série Supreme ADL Tobacco in 1999, 2000, 2001 and 2003.

He won 10 races in Quebec's ACT Series.
