= Doug Heveron =

American racing driver

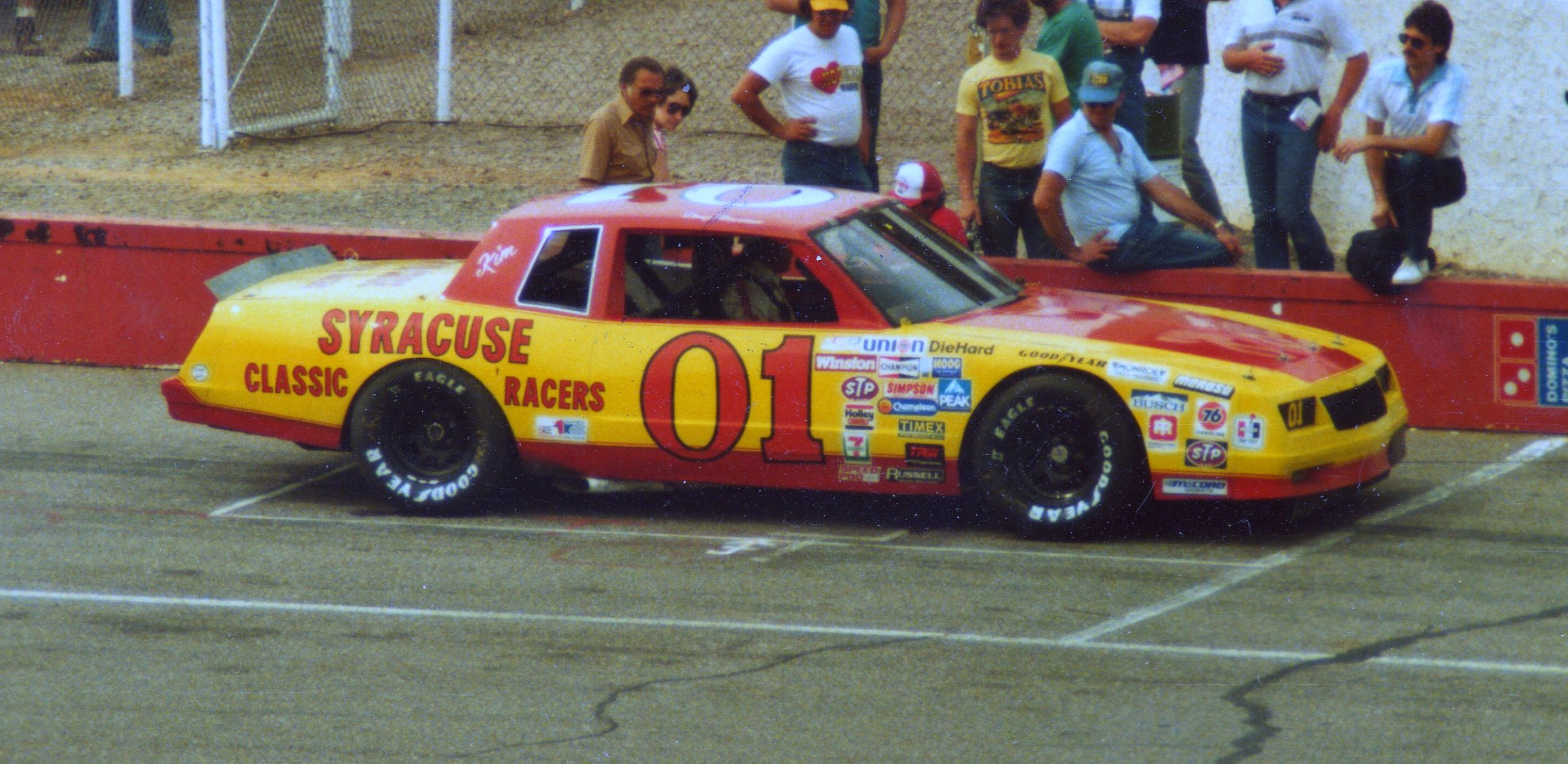
- Born: March 29, 1961 (age 65); Liverpool, New York, U.S.
- Awards: Inducted in the Quarter Midget Of America Hall Of Fame (1990); Inducted in the Greater Syracuse Sports Hall Of Fame (2004)

NASCAR Cup Series career
- 31 races run over 3 years
- Best finish: 35th, 1986 Winston Cup
- First race: 1984 Daytona 500 (Daytona)
- Last race: 1986 Summer 500 (Pocono)
Wins	Top tens	Poles
0	0	0

NASCAR O'Reilly Auto Parts Series career
- 65 races run over 4 years
- Best finish: 19th - 1985
- First race: 1994 Goody's 300 (Daytona)
- Last race: 1997 Hardee's Fried Chicken 250 (Richmond)
Wins	Top tens	Poles
0	5	0

Douglas Wayne Heveron (born March 29, 1961) is an American race car driver from Liverpool, New York. He has driven Supermodifieds, modifieds, IndyCars, NASCAR Winston Cup cars, NASCAR Busch Grand National cars, Sprint Cars, Late Models, and Midgets.

Heveron is the son of Gail and Tom Heveron. Tom was an Oswego Speedway Hall Of Fame member. In 1969, Heveron began racing at the Syracuse Geddes Microd Track at the New York State Fairgrounds when he was eight years old. When he was thirteen years old, Heveron started racing quarter midgets. When he was attending Liverpool High School, he spent time helping regionally known racer Jim Shampine at Shampine Auto Parts.

Heveron entered the supermodified ranks in 1978 in one of Shampine's cars known as the "8 ball". Heveron used the car to become the youngest winner at Oswego Speedway in the Alean 75. He won the International Supermodified Association (ISMA) Rookie of the Year Award that year. Heveron became the dominant driver at Oswego. He won thirteen races in 1981, the Oswego International Classic in 1981 and 1982, and track championships both years. Heveron was the champion of the ISMA tour series from 1978 until 1981.

In 1983, Heveron drove in the CART Championship Car race at Atlanta Motor Speedway and finished twelfth, he then prepared to qualify for the 1983 Indianapolis 500. He spun the car into a wall and shattered his ankle. Between 1983 and 1986, he raced in NASCAR's Winston Cup series. He qualified in the only field in Talladega Superspeedway history in which every car qualified with a speed in excess of 200 miles per hour. He raced in 31 races, with no top-ten finishes. Heveron is best known for flipping over in turn one at the 1984 Firecracker 400, which brought out the final caution to set up an exciting finish with Richard Petty and Cale Yarborough, Petty beat Yarborough en route to his two-hundredth win. Heveron's best year was 1986, when he finished 35th in points.

After his NASCAR team ran out of money, Heveron returned to modified racing. In 1989, he set a new track record, starting on the pole position as a rookie in the Little 500, the USAC sprint car championship. He returned to racing in Oswego in May 1989.

From 1994 until 1997, Heveron raced in NASCAR, this time racing in the Busch Series. He found more success in NASCAR's second-tier circuit, with five top-ten and three top-five finishes in 65 starts. His best result was a second-place finish at Nazareth Speedway in 1995.

From 2000 until 2002, Heveron raced in the TBARA Winged Sprint asphalt racing series. He then starting racing for Heckman Motorsports, living in Jensen Beach, Florida.

== Awards ==
Heveron has been inducted in three halls of fame: the Quarter Midget of America (1990) and the Greater Syracuse Sports Hall of Fame (2004). Oswego Speedway Hall of Fame

== Motorsports career results ==
=== American open-wheel racing ===
(key) (Races in bold indicate pole position)

==== CART PPG Indy Car World Series ====
CART PPG Indy Car World Series results
Year	Team	Chassis	Engine	1	2	3	4	5	6	7	8	9	10	11	12	13	Pos.	Pts	Ref
1983	Rhoades Racing	Wildcat MK8	Cosworth DFX V8t	ATL; 12	INDY; Wth^{†}	MIL	CLE	MCH	ROA	POC	RIV	MDO	MCH	CPL	LAG	PHX	34th	1	
^{†} - Withdrew after getting injured in practice

===== Indianapolis 500 =====
Year	Chassis	Engine	Start	Finish	Team
1983	Wildcat	Cosworth	Wth		Rhoades Racing

=== NASCAR ===
(key) (Bold – Pole position awarded by qualifying time. Italics – Pole position earned by points standings or practice time. * – Most laps led.)

==== Winston Cup Series ====
NASCAR Winston Cup Series results
Year	Team	No.	Make	1	2	3	4	5	6	7	8	9	10	11	12	13	14	15	16	17	18	19	20	21	22	23	24	25	26	27	28	29	30	31	NWCC	Pts	Ref
1984	Heveron Racing	01	Chevy	DAY; 23	RCH; DNQ	CAR	ATL; 30	BRI; 14	NWS	DAR	MAR; 28	TAL; 36	NSV	DOV	CLT; 40	RSD	POC; 26	MCH; 30	DAY; 28	NSV	POC; 21	TAL	MCH; 37	BRI	DAR; DNQ	RCH	DOV; 13		CLT; 37	NWS	CAR	ATL; 18			36th	1265	
1984	U.S. Racing	6	Buick																									MAR; 14							36th	1265	
1984	U.S. Racing	6	Chevy																														RSD; 23		36th	1265	
1985	Heveron Racing	10	Chevy	DAY; 39	RCH	CAR	ATL	BRI	DAR	NWS	MAR	TAL	DOV	CLT	RSD	POC	MCH	DAY																	97th	46	
1985	Spohn Racing	51	Ford																POC; 19	TAL	MCH	BRI	DAR	RCH	DOV	MAR	NWS	CLT	CAR	ATL	RSD				97th	46	
1986	Hamby Motorsports	17	Chevy	DAY; 15			ATL; 35	BRI; 21	DAR; 35	NWS; 16	MAR; 29		DOV; 35	CLT; 33	RSD; 20	POC	MCH		POC; 16	TAL	GLN	MCH	BRI	DAR	RCH	DOV	MAR	NWS	CLT	CAR	ATL	RSD			35th	1052	
1986	Langley Racing	64	Ford		RCH; 13	CAR																													35th	1052	
1986	C & M Motorsports	94	Pontiac									TAL; 15																							35th	1052	
1986	H.L. Waters Racing	0	Chevy															DAY; 33																	35th	1052	
1989	Ellington Racing	1	Buick	DAY; DNQ	CAR	ATL	RCH	DAR	BRI	NWS	MAR	TAL	CLT	DOV	SON	POC	MCH	DAY	POC	TAL	GLN	MCH	BRI	DAR	RCH	DOV	MAR	CLT	NWS	CAR	PHO	ATL			NA	-	
1995	Sadler Brothers Racing	95	Ford	DAY; DNQ	CAR	RCH	ATL	DAR	BRI	NWS	MAR	TAL	SON	CLT	DOV	POC	MCH	DAY	NHA	POC	TAL	IND	GLN	MCH	BRI	DAR	RCH	DOV	MAR	NWS	CLT	CAR	PHO	ATL	NA	-	

===== Daytona 500 =====
Year	Team	Manufacturer	Start	Finish
1984	Heveron Racing	Chevrolet	23	23
1985	Heveron Racing	Chevrolet	23	39
1986	Hamby Motorsports	Chevrolet	34	15
1989	Ellington Racing	Buick	DNQ	
1995	Sadler Brothers Racing	Ford	DNQ	

==== Busch Series ====
NASCAR Busch Series results
Year	Team	No.	Make	1	2	3	4	5	6	7	8	9	10	11	12	13	14	15	16	17	18	19	20	21	22	23	24	25	26	27	28	29	30	31	NBSC	Pts	Ref
1992			Pontiac	DAY	CAR	RCH	ATL	MAR	DAR	BRI	HCY	LAN	DUB	NZH	CLT	DOV	ROU	MYB	GLN	VOL	NHA	TAL	IRP	ROU	MCH	NHA	BRI	DAR	RCH	DOV	CLT; DNQ	MAR	CAR	HCY	NA	-	
1994	Henderson Motorsports	75	Chevy	DAY; 41	CAR		ATL; 42						NHA; 40	NZH; 40	CLT; DNQ	DOV	MYB; 15	GLN	MLW; 41	SBO; 32	TAL; 16	HCY; 4	IRP; 13	MCH; 13		DAR; 35	RCH	DOV; 19	CLT; 40	MAR; 17	CAR; 26				27th	1780	
1994	Henderson Motorsports	75	Olds			RCH; 39		MAR; 5	DAR; 22	HCY; 23	BRI; DNQ	ROU; 30													BRI; DNQ										27th	1780	
1995	Laughlin Racing	35	Ford	DAY; 27		RCH; 18	ATL; 26	NSV; 25	DAR; 13	BRI; 31	HCY; 11	NHA; 32	NZH; 2	CLT; 42	DOV; 29	MYB; 29	GLN; 33	MLW; 21	TAL; 26	SBO; 17	IRP; 26	MCH	BRI; 36	DAR; 30	RCH; 32	DOV; 6	CLT; 18	CAR; 18	HOM; 19						19th	2326	
1995	Laughlin Racing	35	Chevy		CAR; 22																														19th	2326	
1996	Henderson Motorsports	75	Ford	DAY; 46	CAR; 27	RCH; 14	ATL; DNQ	NSV; 13	DAR; 20	BRI; DNQ	HCY; 24	NZH; 22	CLT; 37	DOV; 25	SBO; 13	MYB; 26	GLN; 20	MLW; 6	NHA; 17				BRI; DNQ												30th	1488	
1996	Ken Schrader Racing	52	Chevy																	TAL; 36	IRP	MCH; 29													30th	1488	
1996	Laughlin Racing	45	Chevy																					DAR; DNQ	RCH	DOV	CLT	CAR	HOM						30th	1488	
1997	Taylor Motorsports	40	Ford	DAY; 21	CAR; 22	RCH; 24	ATL; DNQ	LVS	DAR	HCY	TEX	BRI	NSV	TAL	NHA	NZH	CLT	DOV	SBO	GLN	MLW	MYB	GTY	IRP	MCH	BRI	DAR	RCH	DOV	CLT	CAL	CAR	HOM		68th	288	
