= New England Auto Racers Hall of Fame =

New England Antique Racers New England Auto Racers Hall of Fame
- Abbreviation: NEAR
- Founded: 1981
- Hall of Fame: 1998
- Website: www.newenglandautoracers.com

The New England Auto Racers Hall of Fame is a hall of fame for racing-related people in the New England region of the United States. NEAR was established in 1981. The New England Auto Racers Hall of Fame was established in 1998 by the New England Antique Racers.

== New England Antique Racers ==
The group had approximately 350-400 members and 80 antique race cars as of 2007. The group has been inducting area racers in its hall of fame since 1998. By design, the Hall has no permanent home. Instead, a mobile caravan of induction plaques, antique race cars and memorabilia is displayed at major auto racing shows and events in the region.

== Inductees by year ==
Year	Inductee
2025	Mark Bourcier, Richard Brooks, Richard Cohen, Ervine Eastman, Steve Evonsion, Tony Hirschman Jr., Barry Kuhnel, Phil Scott, Bruce Taylor
2024	Bobby Seymour, Dale Shaw, Mike Greci, Paul Newman, Peter Daniels, Rick Martin, Russ Dowd, Skip Barber
2023	Al Hammond, Andy Santerre, Brad Leighton, Joe Howard, John Stygar, Mike Ordway, Mike Weeden, Ted Marsh
2022	Charlie Webster, Dick Houlihan, Jap Membrino, Kenny Tremont Jr., Matt Buckler, Nat Chiavettone, Phil Rondeau, Russ Stoehr
2021	Andy Cote, Bob Cuneo, Dave Grantz, Dave Lind, Jeff Horn, Jim Haynes, John Spence, Kelly Moore, Pete Falconi, Ted Stack
2019	Vinny Annarummo, Wayne Dion, Eddy Eng, Dick Beauregard, Mike Joy, Bob Webber, Eddie Flemke Jr., Rick Mariscal, Brad Lafountain, Jack Doyle, Dick Shuebrook
2018	Butch Elms, Dick Glines, George Pendergastm, George Weaver, Jamie Aube, John Buffum, Ken Tremont, Len Duncan, Mike Stefanik, Pete Silva, Ted Christopher
2017	Ben Dodge Jr, Bobby Gahan, Dutch Schaefer, Gardiner Leavitt, Jeff Fuller, Joe McNulty, Red Barbeau, Rick Fuller, Russ Wood, Steve Bird, Tom Dunn
2016	Dwight Jarvis, Francis Stanley, Fred Meeker, Freelan Stanley, George ‘Moose’ Hewitt, Jackie Arute, Jerry Marquis, John Burgess, Ken Bouchard, Nokie Fornoro, Randy Lajoie, Ricky Craven
2015	Greg Sacks, Jim McCallum, Jim Moffat, Joe Fontana, Joey Laquerre, Lew Boyd, Paul Dunigan, Red MacDonald, Ronnie Marvin, Sam Posey, Stan Greger
2014	Bob Tasca, Briggs Cunningham, Dave Tourigny, Deke Astle, Fred Borden, Fred Schulz, Jim Martel, Mike Rowe, Pappy Forsyth, R.A. Silvia, Ron Wyckoff
2013	Bill Eldridge, Bob Sharp, Bob Stefanik, Brian Ross, Drew Fornoro, Ralph Nason, Ron Berndt, Stan Meserve
2012 Pioneers	Al Pillion, Beebe Zalenski, Billy Tibbert, Bob Oliver, Charlie Ethier, Ed Patnode, Ed Stone, Eddie Casterline, Frank Simonetti, George Monsen, George Rice, Gordon Ross, Hank Stevens, Joe Tinty, Johnny Georgiades, Ray Brown, Sparky Belmont, Tony Mordino, Wally Silva, Wen Kelly
2012	Mario Fiore, Moe Gherzi, Jerry Humiston, Jim Jorgensen, Joey Kourafas, Roland Lapierre Sr, Reggie Ruggiero, Irene Venditti
2011	Buddy Bardwell, Punky Caron, Louis D'Amore, Jerry Dolliver, Danny Galullo, Garuti Brothers, Vic Kangas, Val LeSieur, Skip Matczak, Dan Meservey, Russ Nutting
2010	Chuck Arnold, Archie Blackadar, Geoff Bodine, Frank Ferrara, Pete Fiandaca, Bob Garbarino, Marty Harty, Vic Miller, Mike Murphy, George Savary, Billy Simons
2009	Bob Bahre, Art Barry, Bert Brooks, Tom Curley, Bobby Dragon, John Fitch, Harold Hanaford, Rollie Lindblad, Jim McConnell, Paul Richardson, Bertha Small
2008	Dave Alkas, Dick Batchelder, Dick Berggren, Joe Brady, Howie Brown, Dave Darveau, Johnny Gammell, George Lombardo, Fred Luchesi, Pete Zanardi
2007	Bentley Warren. Jean-Paul Cabana, Dave Dion, John Falconi Sr, Bob Johnson, John McCarthy, Bob Potter, John Rosati, George W. Barber, Dick Eagan, Dick Garrett
2006	Gene Angelillo, Russ Conway, Ken Smith, Robbie Crouch, Bob Libby, Phil Libby, Jim McGee, Joe Rosenfield, Fred Gaudiosi, Bob Vitari, Vic Bombaci, Dick Wolsenhulme, Louis Seymour, Johnny Kay, Harold Cummings, Red Cummings, Bill Randall
2005	Dick Armstrong, Smokey Boutwell, Don Collins, Joe Csiki, Moran Rabideau, Sonny Rabideau, Reino Tulonen
2004	Lenny Boehler, Harmon Dragon, Beaver Dragon, Dick Dixon, Billy Harman, Charlie Jarzombek, Bill Schindler, Paul Trowbridge, Paul Tremaine, Bob Blair, Fred Frame, Sammy Packard
2003	Richard Burgess, Stanley Fadden, Donald Hoenig, Booker T. Jones, Bob Judkins, Joe Sostilio, Bob Polverari, Dick Watson
2002	Nick Fonoro, John Koszela, Sonny Koszela, Don MacLaren, Dick McCabe, Ray Miller, Ken Squier, Johnny Thomson, Phil Walters, Bill Wimble
2001	Jack Arute Sr, Hully Bunn, Ralph Cusack, Don MacTavish, Fred Rosner, Don Rounds, Art Rousseau, Bobby Santos III, Chick Stockwell, Denny Zimmerman
2000	Mario Caruso, Fats Caruso, Homer Drew, Charlie Elliott, Dave Humphrey, Buddy Krebs, Don LaJoie, Chauncey Maggiacomo, Ralph Moody, Ron Narducci, George Summers
1999	Leo Cleary, Fred DeSarro, Melvin Foote, Billy Greco, Ralph Harrington, Hop Harrington, Marvin Rifchin, Anthony Venditti, Eddie West
1998	Gene Bergin, Ron Bouchard, Rene Charland, Richie Evans, Ed Flemke Sr, Ernie Gahan, Pete Hamilton, Leo Libby (Taz), Ollie Silva, Bill Slater, Carl Berghman, Bugsy Stevens, Harvey Tattersall Jr, Bill Welch

== See also ==
- Sports in New England
