= Alexandre Gingras =

Canadian racing driver (born 1974)

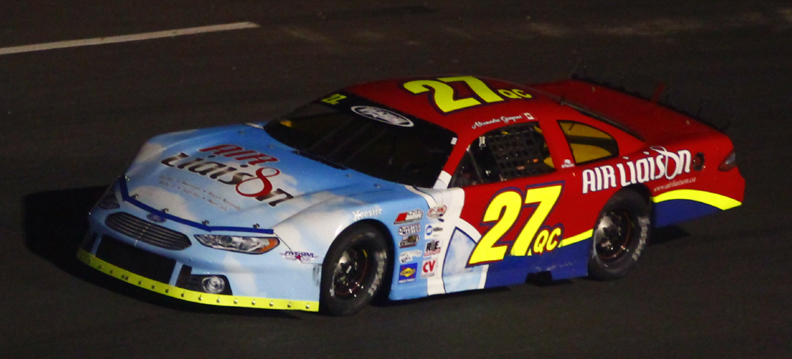
- Gingras at Autodrome Chaudière in 2013
- Born: August 5, 1974 (age 52) Quebec, Canada

PASS North Series career
- Debut season: 1990s
- Car number: 27

Alexandre Gingras (born August 5, 1974) is a Canadian racing driver. He competes in the PASS North Series. He previously competed in the Quebec ACT Series.

Champion of the Quebec ACT Series in 2008, he won four races in the Quebec ACT Series and one in the US-based ACT Tour.

He finished fourth in the PASS North championship in 2011.
