= International Supermodified Association =

American auto racing sanctioning body

- Sport: Auto racing
- Jurisdiction: United States, Canada
- Abbreviation: ISMA
- Founded: 1974
- Headquarters: Oswego, New York

Official website
- www.ismasupers.com
- (United States)
- (Canada)

The International Super Modified Association (ISMA) is a sanctioning body of short track auto racing in the United States. It is the largest sanctioning body of super modified racing, an open wheel discipline.

== History ==
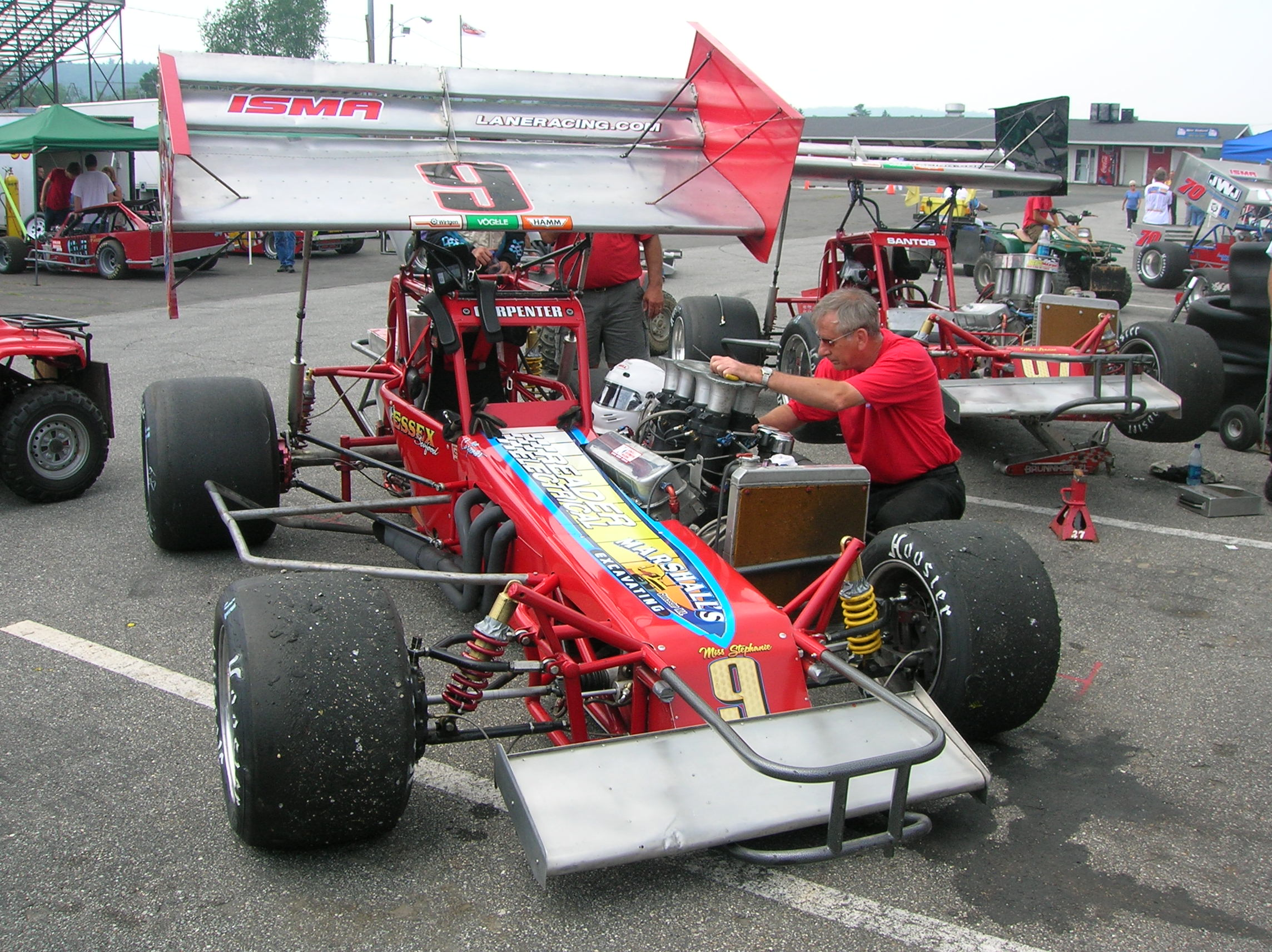
2006 ISMA SuperModified

The International Super Modified Association (ISMA) was founded in 1974 by Jim Shampine and Nolan Swift, with support from Tom Heveron and Jacob Speck. It aimed to improve safety and increase race events for better driver support. Heveron served as president while Shampine and Fred Graves were also in key roles.

ISMA negotiated with the Lancaster National Speedway & Dragway in Lancaster, New York, to hold its first-ever race at the track. It was a 40-lap event on July 3, 1974. Todd Gibson of Richwood, Ohio, emerged as the winner, marking a key moment in the association’s expansion into new venues. The following year, ISMA booked races at Fulton Speedway with a $5,000 purse and $1,000 to win.

Starting in 1976, ISMA developed a point fund. Tracks contributed $500–$1,000 per race to support this fund. ISMA awards points to car owners, not the drivers. Joining the Heveron, Shampine, and Graves team, Shirley Letcher took over the responsibility for the point system. In just three seasons, ISMA had sanctioned over $96,000 in purse money and races, adding a point fund of $4,400 paid by promoters, providing a tow fund at all races, requiring all promoters to hold insurance, and working to expand the race schedule to other tracks. Steve Giola Jr. became the first point-based champion that year.

== Current ==
ISMA has recently introduced a franchise system in which teams purchase a franchise at the beginning of the season. Each of the 19 franchise teams may miss up to 3 shows during the race season while being guaranteed a minimum starting purse of $1,000 at each event.

ISMA typically approves 13 to 17 events annually, which includes two races from the Super Modified Triple Crown Series held on paved short tracks ranging from one-quarter to five-eighths of a mile in length, situated across six states and Canada. In 2023, ISMA merged with the Midwest Super Modified Series (MSS), focusing on events in New York, Ohio, and Michigan. The 2024 schedule includes races at Oswego, Evans Mills (New York), Sandusky, Lorain County (Ohio), Lee, Claremont (New Hampshire), Berlin (Michigan), and Caraway (North Carolina).

== Champions ==
Bracketed numbers denote a cumulative number of championships:

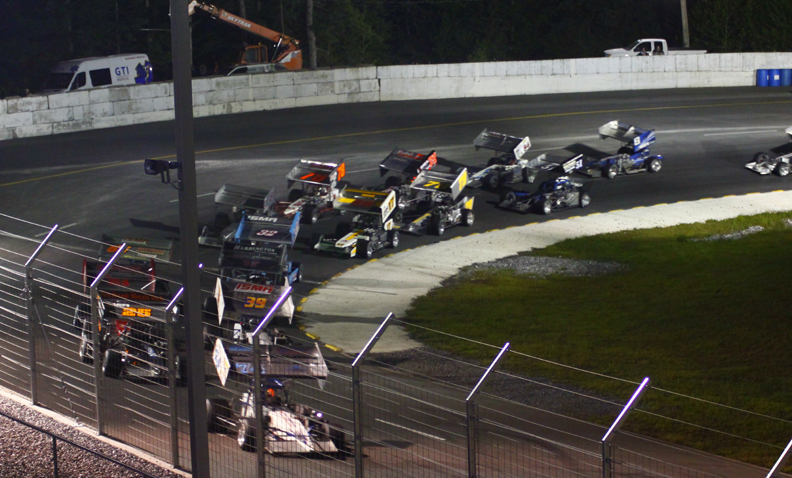
2013 ISMA cars at L'Autodrome Chaudière in Canada

Season	Driver
1976	Steve Gioia Jr. (1)
1977	Jim Shampine (1)
1978	Steve Gioia Jr. (2)
1979	Doug Heveron (1)
1980	Doug Heveron (2)
1981	Doug Heveron (3)
1982	Doug Heveron (4)
1983	Den Wheeler (1)
1984	Bentley Warren (1)
1985	Steve Gioia Jr. (3)
1986	Steve Gioia Jr. (4)
1987	Joe Gosek (1)
1988	Bentley Warren (2)
1989	Bentley Warren (3)
1990	Bentley Warren (4)
1991	Russ Wood (1)
1992	Pat Abold (1)
1993	Pat Abold (2)
1994	Russ Wood (2)
1995	Mike Ordway Sr. (1)
1996	Russ Wood (3)
1997	Russ Wood (4)
1998	Mike Ordway Sr. (2)
1999	Russ Wood (5)
2000	Joe Gosek (2)
2001	Dave McKnight Jr. (1)
2002	Russ Wood (6)
2003	Chris Perley (1)
2004	Chris Perley (2)
2005	Pat Abold (3)
2006	Chris Perley (3)
2007	Chris Perley (4)
2008	Chris Perley (5)
2009	Chris Perley (6)
2010	Russ Wood (7)
2011	Russ Wood (8)
2012	Mike Lichty (1)
2013	Lou Cicconi Jr. (1)
2014	Ben Seitz (1)
2015	Dave Shullick Jr. (1)
2016	Dave Shullick Jr. (2)
2017	Jonathan McKennedy (1)
2018	Kyle Edwards (1)
2019	Mike Lichty (2)
2021	Otto Sitterly (1)
2022	Otto Sitterly (2)
2023	Mike McVetta (1)
2024	Otto Sitterly (3)
2025	Mike McVetta (2)

Competitors notable outside of ISMA:

- Bentley Warren- 37 IndyCar Series starts including the 1971 and 1975 Indianapolis 500.
- Doug Heveron- 96 professional NASCAR starts, 1 IndyCar Series start, attempted 1983 Indianapolis 500.
- Joe Gosek- Started the 1996 Indianapolis 500.
- Davey Hamilton- 56 IndyCar Series starts including 14 Indianapolis 500 starts, with a best finish of 4th.
- Doug Didero- 3 professional NASCAR starts, 6 IndyCar Series starts, attempted 2000 Indianapolis 500.
- Mike McLaughlin- 318 professional NASCAR starts with 6 wins, 1988 Winston Modified Tour Champion.
- Johnny Benson Jr.- 503 professional NASCAR starts with 18 wins, 1995 Busch Series Champion, 2008 Craftsman Truck Series Champion, 1993 ASA National Tour Champion.
- Bobby Santos III- 7 professional NASCAR starts, 2010 NASCAR Whelen Modified Tour champion.
- Ted Christopher- 29 professional NASCAR starts, 48 NASCAR Modified wins, 2008 Whelen Modified Tour Champion, 2x 24 Hours of Daytona starts.
