= Mayetta =

Mayetta may refer to:

- Mayetta, Kansas
- Mayetta, New Jersey
