= 2007 Autism Speaks 400 =

Race details
- Race 13 of 36 in the 2007 NASCAR Nextel Cup Series season
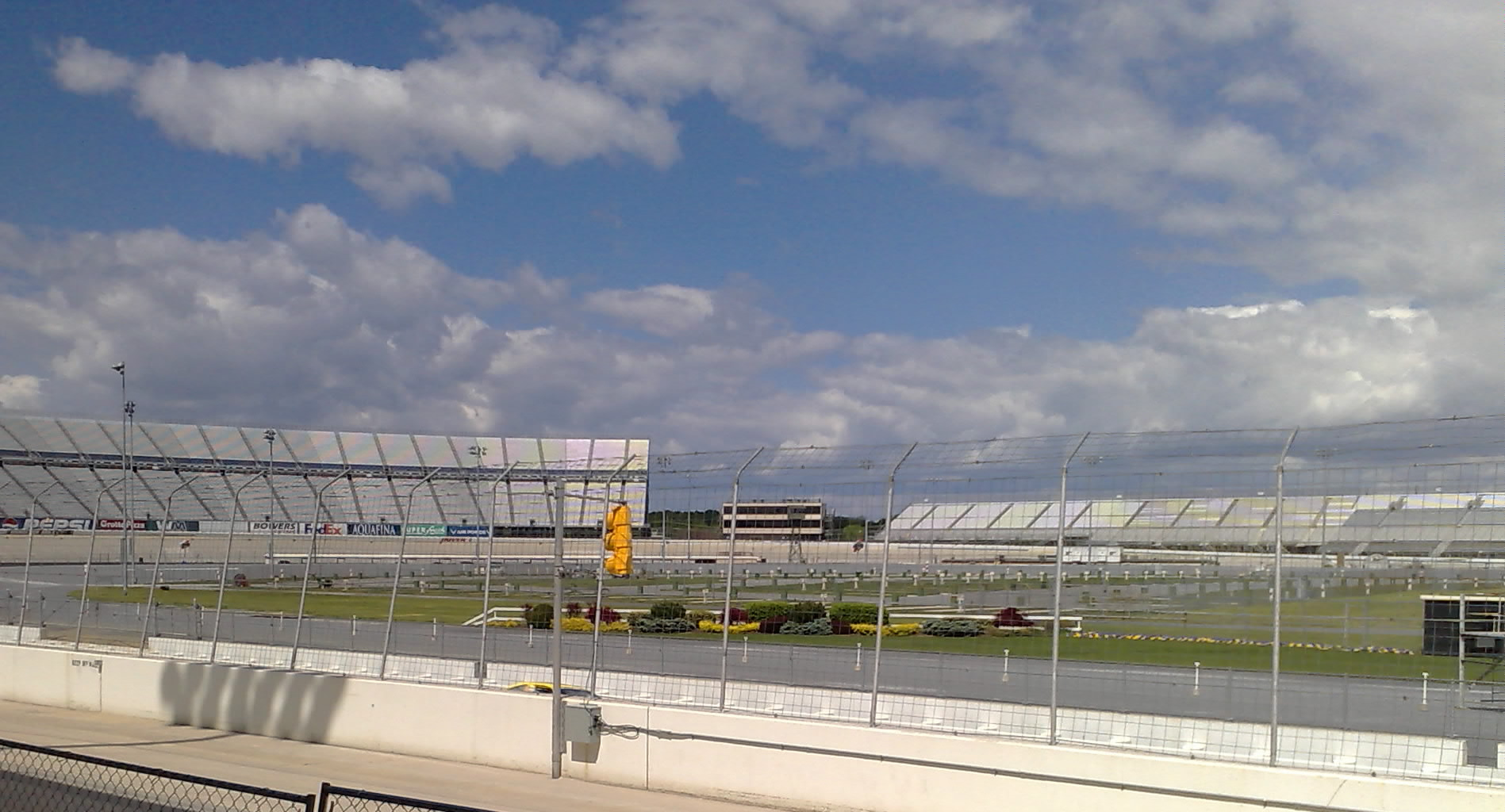
- Dover International Speedway in 2007
- Date: June 4, 2007
- Official name: Autism Speaks 400
- Location: Dover International Speedway, Dover, Delaware
- Course: Permanent racing facility
- Course length: 1.0 miles (1.609 km)
- Distance: 400 laps, 400 mi (643.737 km)
- Weather: Temperatures up to 82.4 °F (28.0 °C); wind speeds up to 18.1 miles per hour (29.1 km/h)
- Average speed: 118.95 miles per hour (191.43 km/h)

Pole position
Driver	Ryan Newman	Penske Racing
- Time: 23.541

Most laps led
Driver	Martin Truex Jr.	Dale Earnhardt, Inc.
- Laps: 216

Winner
No. 1	Martin Truex Jr.	Dale Earnhardt, Inc.

Television in the United States
- Network: Fox Broadcasting Company
- Announcers: Mike Joy, Darrell Waltrip and Larry McReynolds

The 2007 Autism Speaks 400 presented by Visa was the thirteenth race of the 2007 NASCAR Nextel Cup season. It was scheduled to be run on Sunday, June 3, 2007, at Dover International Speedway in Dover, Delaware, but was postponed due to rain as a result of the remnants of Tropical Storm Barry and was run on Monday, June 4. The race marked the halfway point to the 2007 Chase for the Nextel Cup, the sixth race to use the Car of Tomorrow template, and the final race to be telecast on Fox for the season.

== Summary ==
The race is named for Autism Speaks, a charity that provides advocacy and services for people who have autism, as well as their families. Autism had become a cause in the NASCAR garage; the nieces of Cup drivers Elliott Sadler and Jamie McMurray and the son of NASCAR on Fox director Artie Kempner have the disorder. For each race ticket which was sold before June 1, race sponsor Visa donated $5 to Autism Speaks.

=== Qualifying ===
Ryan Newman won the pole for the second week in a row, with an average speed of 152.925 miles per hour. Michael Waltrip qualified for his first points-paying race since the Daytona 500, 12 races earlier.

=== Race ===
Martin Truex Jr. won the race, his first in Nextel Cup Series competition. For Truex, the victory was especially sweet, as he hails from Mayetta, New Jersey, a community in the Jersey Shore area about 100 miles northeast of Dover. The driver of the Chevrolet Impala for Dale Earnhardt, Inc. led 216 of the 400 laps. The rest of the Top 5, in order: Newman, Carl Edwards, Denny Hamlin, and Matt Kenseth.

Kurt Busch was twice wrecked or shoved by longtime rival Tony Stewart and on pit road, he pulled alongside Tony Stewart forcing a crew member to have to jump to avoid being hit, and gestured from his window. Busch was instantly black flagged with the white cross, was fined $100,000 and put on probation for the rest of the year. Busch ended up 42nd in the race results.

In the points standings, Jeff Gordon led Jimmie Johnson by 152 points at the checkered flag. On the other hand, of the "Race to the Chase", eight drivers (11th through 18th) were separated by just 127 points.

During the race, it was announced that Bill France Jr., who was NASCAR's chairman from 1972 to 2003, and its president from 1972 to 2000, had died from cancer at the age of 74 at 1:00 PM EST. The American flag at Dover was immediately lowered to half-staff and the death was announced over the public address system and on the telecast at lap 261 (right before the accident and confrontation between Busch and Stewart), where Mike Joy's somber tone cast a pall as he called Truex's first-ever Cup win.

==== Top 10 results ====
Pos.	No.	Driver	Car	Team
1.	#1	Martin Truex Jr.	Chevrolet	Dale Earnhardt Incorporated
2.	#12	Ryan Newman	Dodge	Penske Racing South
3.	#99	Carl Edwards	Ford	Roush Fenway Racing
4.	#11	Denny Hamlin	Chevrolet	Joe Gibbs Racing
5.	#17	Matt Kenseth	Ford	Roush Fenway Racing
6.	#16	Greg Biffle	Ford	Roush Fenway Racing
7.	#01	Mark Martin	Chevrolet	Ginn Racing
8.	#07	Clint Bowyer	Chevrolet	Richard Childress Racing
9.	#24	Jeff Gordon	Chevrolet	Hendrick Motorsports
10.	#7	Robby Gordon	Ford	Robby Gordon Motorsports

== Notes ==
- The postponement due to rain was the third of the season, which matched the combined total for the 2003 through 2006 seasons.
- Catherine Bell was grand marshal of the race.

Previous race: 2007 Coca-Cola 600	Nextel Cup Series; 2007 season	Next race: 2007 Pocono 500
