= Martin Truex Jr. =

American racing driver (born 1980)

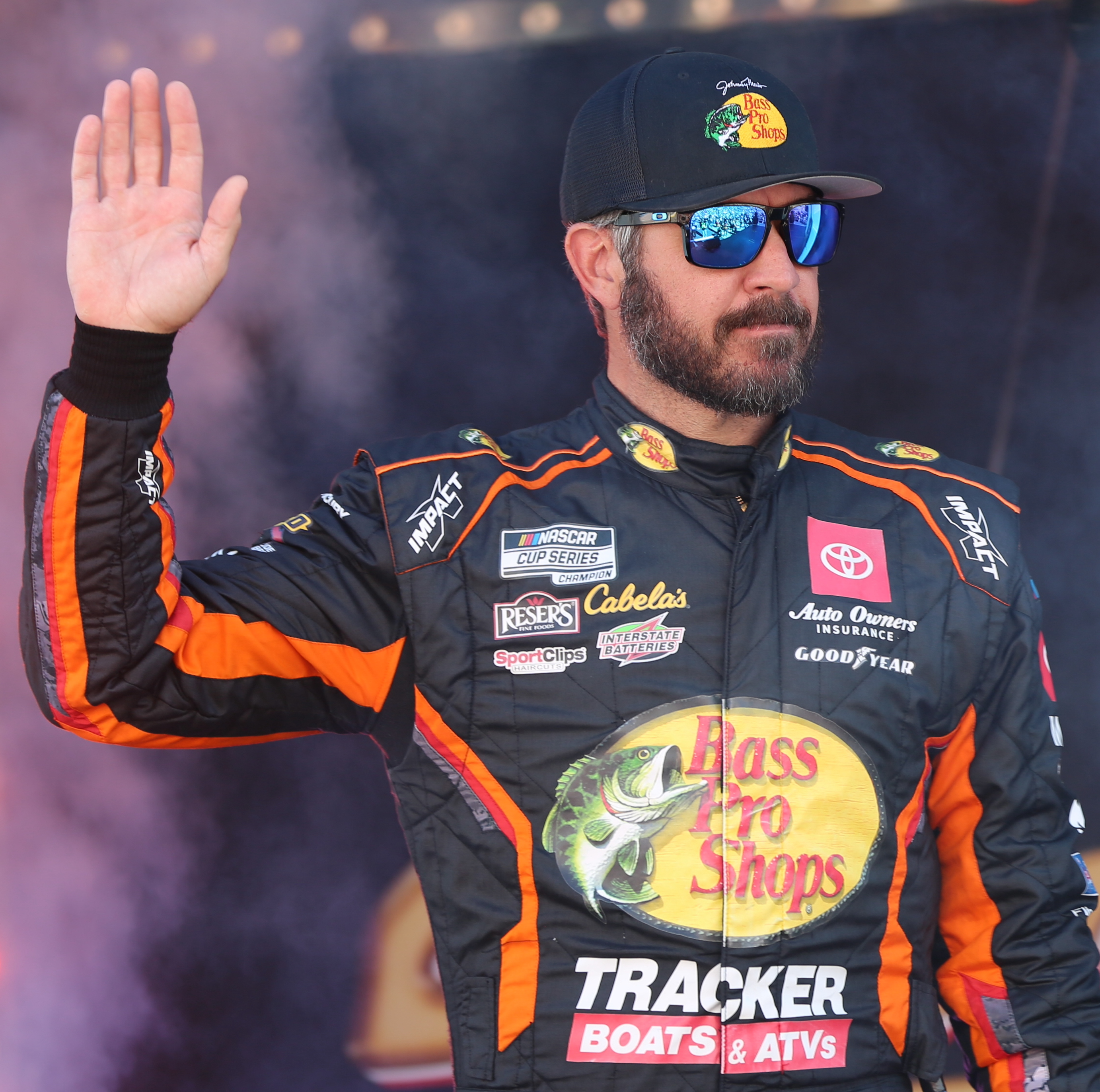
- Truex Jr. at Las Vegas Motor Speedway in 2024
- Born: Martin Lee Truex Jr. June 29, 1980 (age 46); Mayetta, New Jersey, U.S.
- Height: 5 ft 11 in (1.80 m)
- Weight: 180 lb (82 kg)
- Achievements: 2017 Monster Energy NASCAR Cup Series Champion; 2017, 2023 NASCAR Cup Series Regular Season Champion; 2004, 2005 NASCAR Busch Series Champion; 2016, 2019 Coca-Cola 600 winner 2016 Southern 500 winner 2007, 2010 NASCAR All-Star Race Open winner 2023 Busch Light Clash Winner
- Awards: 2004, 2005 Busch Series Most Popular Driver; 2018 ESPY Best Driver; Named one of NASCAR's 75 Greatest Drivers (2023)

NASCAR Cup Series career
- 694 races run over 22 years
- 2025 position: 42nd
- Best finish: 1st (2017)
- First race: 2004 Bass Pro Shops MBNA 500 (Atlanta)
- Last race: 2025 Daytona 500 (Daytona)
- First win: 2007 Autism Speaks 400 (Dover)
- Last win: 2023 Crayon 301 (New Hampshire)
| Wins | Top tens | Poles |
|---|---|---|
| 34 | 291 | 25 |

NASCAR O'Reilly Auto Parts Series career
- 104 races run over 11 years
- 2021 position: 76th
- Best finish: 1st (2004, 2005)
- First race: 2001 MBNA.com 200 (Dover)
- Last race: 2021 EchoPark 250 (Atlanta)
- First win: 2004 Sharpie Professional 250 (Bristol)
- Last win: 2006 Aaron's 312 (Talladega)
| Wins | Top tens | Poles |
|---|---|---|
| 13 | 62 | 10 |

NASCAR FedEx Freight Truck Series career
- 3 races run over 3 years
- 2021 position: 95th
- Best finish: 77th (2005)
- First race: 2005 Toyota Tundra Milwaukee 200 (Milwaukee)
- Last race: 2021 Pinty's Truck Race on Dirt (Bristol Dirt)
- First win: 2021 Pinty's Truck Race on Dirt (Bristol Dirt)
| Wins | Top tens | Poles |
|---|---|---|
| 1 | 1 | 0 |

ARCA Menards Series East career
- 62 races run over 4 years
- Best finish: 8th (2001)
- First race: 2000 NAPA 150 (Lee)
- Last race: 2003 New Hampshire 125 (New Hampshire)
- First win: 2000 ThatLook.com 100 (New Hampshire)
- Last win: 2003 New England 125 (New Hampshire)
| Wins | Top tens | Poles |
|---|---|---|
| 5 | 32 | 7 |
- Statistics up to date as of November 6, 2025.

Martin Lee Truex Jr. (born June 29, 1980) is an American former professional stock car racing driver. He is the 2017 NASCAR Cup Series champion and a two-time Xfinity Series champion, having won two consecutive championships in 2004 and 2005. Truex last competed in the NASCAR Cup Series, driving the No. 56 Toyota Camry XSE for Tricon Garage.

Many members of Truex Jr.'s family are current or retired NASCAR drivers. His younger brother Ryan Truex competes in the NASCAR Xfinity Series for JGR, and is a two-time consecutive champion in the ARCA Menards Series East. His late father Martin Sr. competed in the East Series in the 1990s. His uncle Barney competed part-time in the Whelen Modified Tour in the 1980s. His cousins, Curtis Truex Jr. and Tyler Truex, are late model racing drivers.

== Early career ==
The son of former racer Martin Truex Sr., Martin Jr. began his racing career driving go-karts at the New Egypt Speedway, located in Ocean County, New Jersey, when it was still a paved track (the track was later switched to dirt). Truex Jr. made his move to the Modified division at Wall Stadium in 1998, as soon as he was old enough to race a car under New Jersey regulations, at age eighteen.

In 2000, Truex moved south and rented a home from Dale Earnhardt Jr. in Mooresville, North Carolina, eventually purchasing his own home there. Following in his late father's footsteps, he began racing in the Busch North Series. He ran three full seasons (2000 to 2002) and made limited starts in 2003. Truex claimed thirteen poles and five wins driving his family-owned No. 56 SeaWatch Chevy.

== NASCAR ==
=== 2001–2005: Busch Series ===
Truex made his first Busch Series start in 2001 at Dover International Speedway in his late father's No. 56 Chevy. He started nineteenth but finished 38th after an early wreck. In 2002, Truex drove one race for Phoenix Racing at New Hampshire International Speedway, starting thirteenth and finishing 29th. He ran three races the rest of that season for his late father, his best finish seventeenth at Dover.

In 2003, Truex began the season with his late father's team, before he was hired by Dale Earnhardt Jr. to drive his No. 81 Chance 2 Motorsports Chevy. He made his debut with Chance 2 at Richmond International Raceway, where he qualified sixth and led 11 laps before transmission failure forced him to a 31st-place finish. He split time between Chance 2 and his late father's team for the balance of the season, except at Dover, where he drove for Stanton Barrett. He had a sixth-place run at Bristol Motor Speedway and ended the season with two consecutive second-place finishes. He ran a total of ten races that season.

Truex raced full-time for Chance 2 in 2004. At Bristol Motor Speedway, he would earn his first career victory, and he would later add three more victories over the next seven races. This would include a victory at Talladega Superspeedway, which broke his car owner's streak of winning restrictor plate races in the Busch Series, and a victory at the final NASCAR event held at Nazareth Speedway. He took the lead in the championship after Nazareth but lost it to rookie Kyle Busch a few races later. However, a series of top-five and top-ten finishes in the second half of the season allowed Truex to pull away from Busch, clinching the Busch Series championship with a race to spare.

While on his way to that championship, Truex made an appearance in the Nextel Cup Series as a relief driver to Dale Earnhardt Jr., who had suffered burns in a sports car accident. Truex started his first career Cup race for Dale Earnhardt, Inc. (DEI) in the No. 1 at Atlanta Motor Speedway later that year, qualifying 33rd and finishing 37th.

Truex stayed in the Busch Series to defend his championship in 2005, winning the title for the second season in a row. He won the first Busch Series points race held outside the United States, in Mexico, as well as defending his wins at Talladega and Dover International Speedway. He took his first Daytona International Speedway win on July 1, 2005.

=== 2006–2008: Dale Earnhardt, Inc. ===
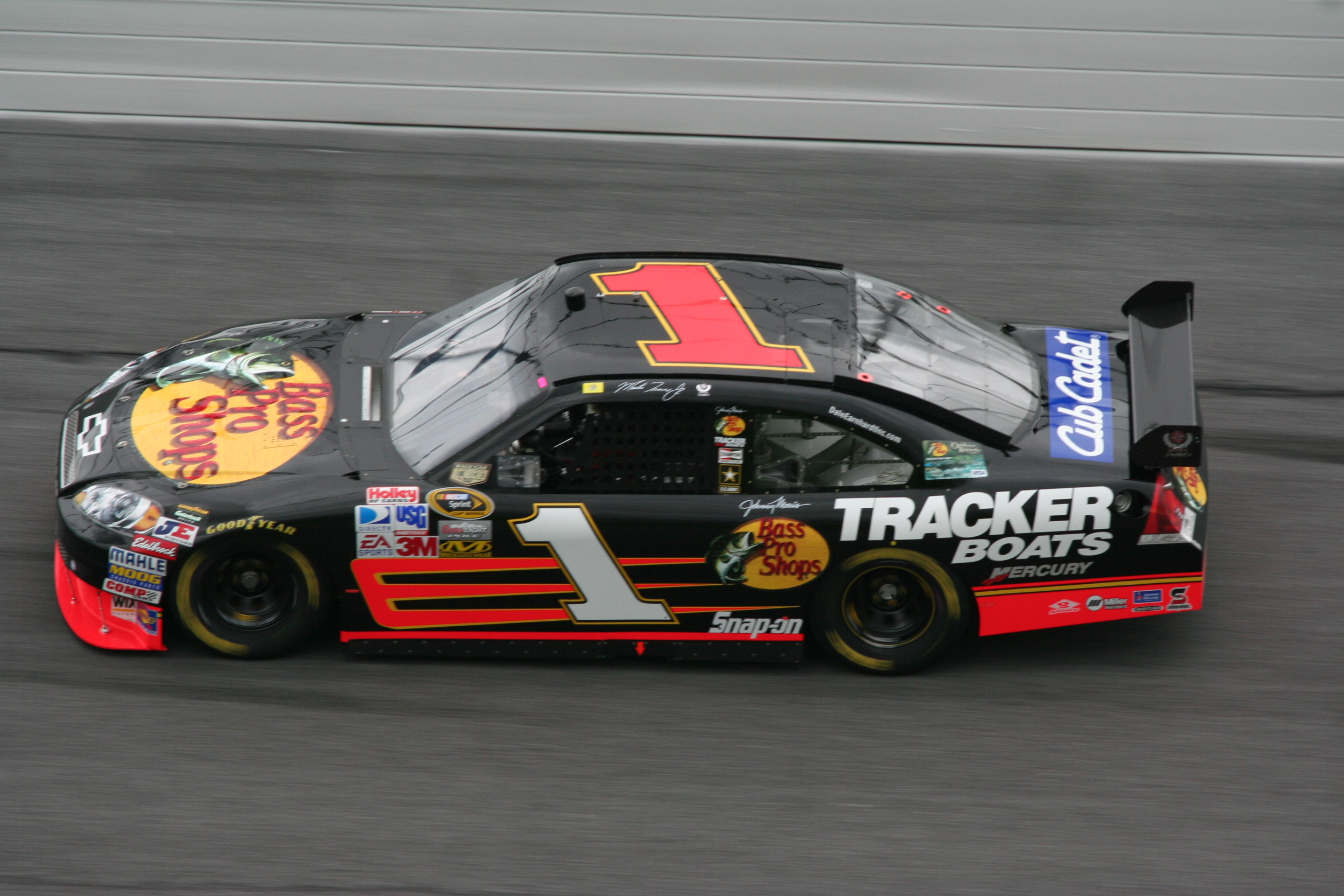
2008 Sprint Cup car

In 2006, Truex moved to the No. 1 DEI Chevy full-time in the Nextel Cup Series. He had two top-five finishes and finished nineteenth in points. Truex's first win of the 2007 season was in the NASCAR Nextel All-Star Open, securing a spot in the 2007 Nextel All-Star Challenge, where he finished tenth.

A few weeks later, he won the Autism Speaks 400, scoring his first Sprint Cup Series win with an interval of seven seconds between pole-sitter Ryan Newman and himself, even though he led over half of the race—216 of the 400 laps.

This victory led to a jump in overall points, advancing him to thirteenth, followed by a 3rd-place finish at Pocono Raceway and a second-place finish at Michigan. With a fifteenth-place finish in the Chevy Rock and Roll 400, Truex clinched a spot in his first Chase for the Sprint Cup and finished eleventh in points at season's end. He did not go to victory lane in 2008, but he did have eleven top-tens and finished fifteenth in the final points standings.

=== 2009: Earnhardt-Ganassi Racing ===
At the beginning of the 2009 season, Dale Earnhardt, Inc. merged into Chip Ganassi Racing and was renamed Earnhardt-Ganassi Racing with Felix Sabates. The move was in effect a closing of DEI, and Truex's No. 1 moved to Ganassi to replace the defunct No. 41 of Reed Sorenson. Truex began the year by winning the pole for the Daytona 500. Later in the season, Truex had claimed two more pole positions at Atlanta and Phoenix, following his first pole since 2007 at Texas.

2009 would be Truex's lone season with Earnhardt-Ganassi Racing, as he departed following the season and was replaced by Jamie McMurray.

=== 2010–2013: Michael Waltrip Racing ===
==== 2010–2011 ====
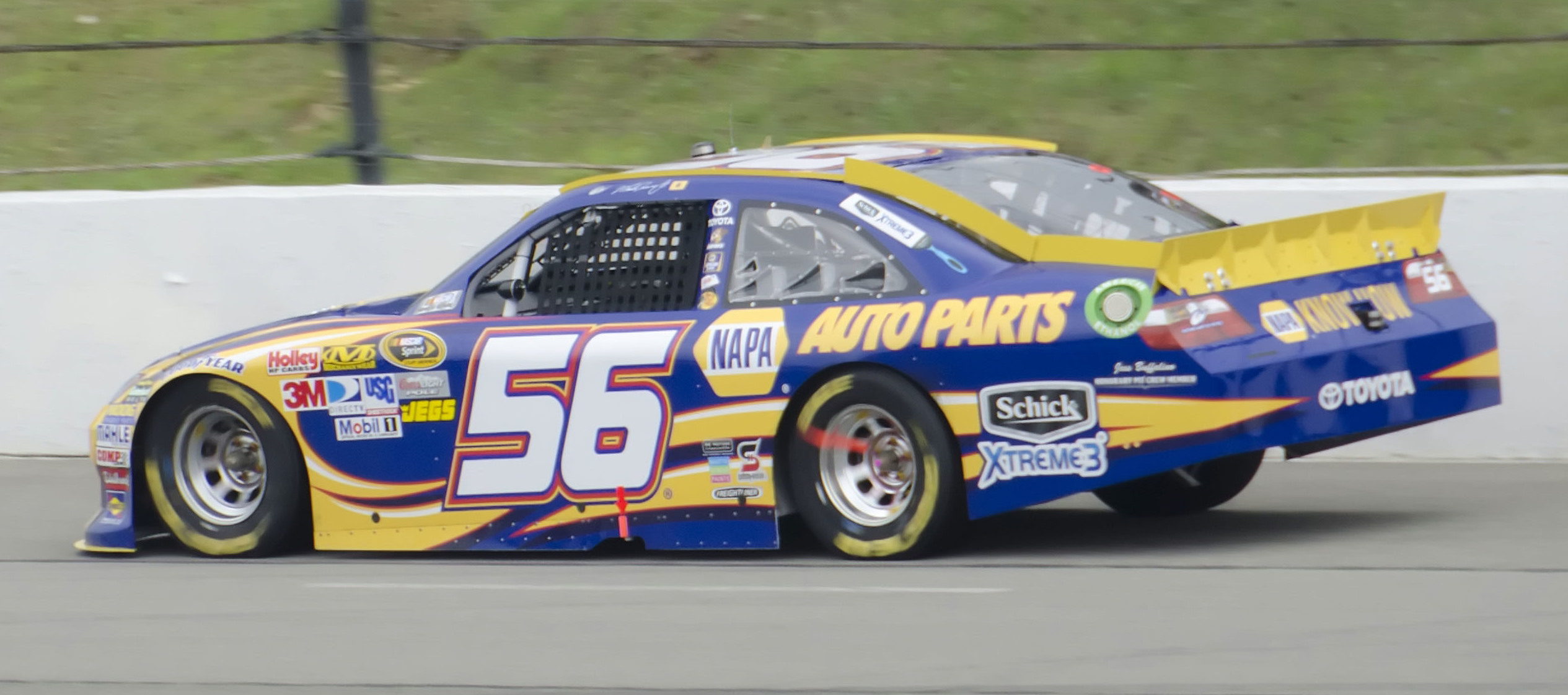
Truex's No. 56 at Pocono Raceway in 2011

After the 2009 season, Truex left Earnhardt-Ganassi Racing to drive the No. 56 Toyota Camry for Michael Waltrip Racing, receiving owner points from the No. 55 car formerly driven by Waltrip. The No. 56 was the number Martin's late father drove in during his time in the Grand National Division and is considered the "family number". In his first race for Michael Waltrip Racing, Truex finished sixth in the Daytona 500.

After a series of setbacks, including a blown engine and accidents, in the following three weeks, he fell back to 24th in the point standings, but in the next seven races, after finishing in the top-twelve five times and all top-nineteen finishes, he would rise to thirteenth in the final point standings. At Dover, he earned his fifth career pole. Truex won the All-Star Showdown at Charlotte, thereby earning the first transfer spot for the All-Star Race, which he finished second in from a nineteenth (out of 21) starting spot. Truex would go on to finish the 2010 season 22nd in the point standings with one top-five finish and seven top-ten finishes.

At Martinsville the following year in 2011, a stuck throttle caused Truex to make contact with Kasey Kahne, resulting in a large wreck; Truex hit the wall hard head-on and his car flew on fire for a few seconds as Kahne hit the wall in his car's rear. Truex climbed out instantly and went to check on Kahne, who received a standing ovation as he climbed out uninjured. Truex then left with officials for the care center. He said the wreck was the hardest of his career, and both Truex and Kahne were released with normal symptoms. The next week, officials told him his wreck was the hardest crash at Martinsville. Truex won another pole at Dover International Raceway. Truex ran well in most of the races but often struggled to finish the races. He was docked 25 points because of a windshield violation in the fall Talladega race. He ended the season 18th in points, with three top-fives and twelve top-tens.

==== 2012 ====
Truex started 2012 well, winning a $200,000 bonus and finishing seventh in the Daytona 500. He finally hit his stride in Texas, winning the pole and leading 69 laps. The following week at Kansas, he started sixth and dominated the race, leading 173 of 267 laps but falling short to Denny Hamlin. At Atlanta, he led forty of the final 46 laps, but ultimately fell short to Hamlin again when he was forced to pit under a late-race caution for fuel, ending up fourth. Truex finished 21st; however, he had a spot clinched in the Chase, and ultimately made it in. He ended up eleventh in the points, with zero wins, seven top-fives, and nineteen top-tens.

==== 2013: Spingate incident ====
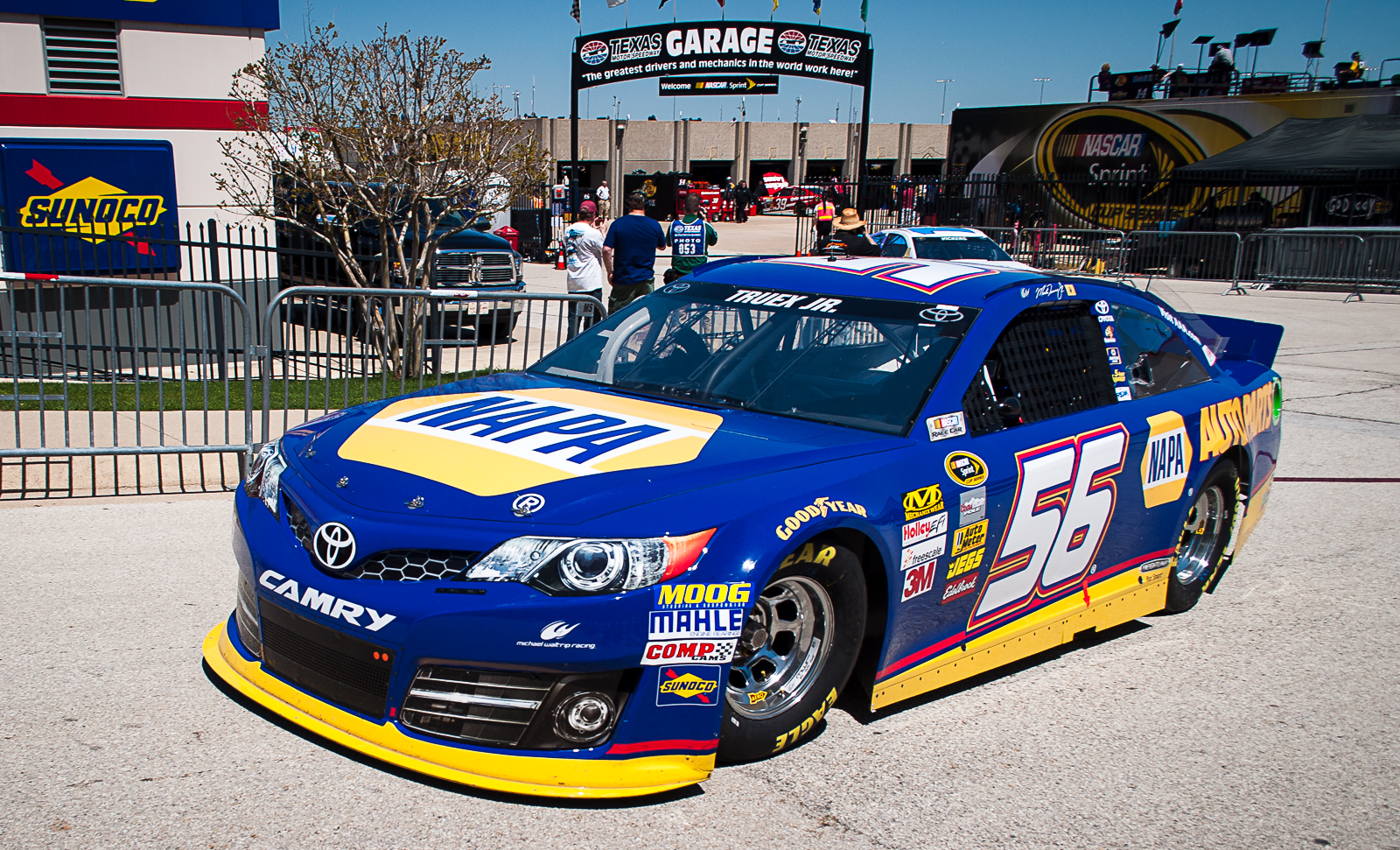
Truex's 2013 Sprint Cup car at Texas Motor Speedway

Truex had an up-and-down 2013 season. He had a few top-five finishes in the early races. His first best run of 2013 was Texas, when he led during the final 55 laps of the race but ended up losing to Kyle Busch. Truex also had low notes, including an accident at Martinsville and a blown engine at Dover. The highlight of the season was at Sonoma, when Truex broke a 218-race winless streak, starting fourteenth on the starting grid and working his way up to win by over eight seconds over Jeff Gordon. Truex's 218-race winless streak is second only to Bill Elliott, who went winless in 226 races between 1994 and 2001. It is only the second time a car numbered No. 56 won in NASCAR's highest division, the first being Jim Hurtubise in a 1966 Atlanta race.

Returning to Bristol, Truex was involved in a wreck on Lap 448 where his car hit an inside wall at an angle that broke his right wrist; he continued racing despite wearing a cast on his right wrist. At Atlanta, despite nursing a broken wrist, Truex finished third to Kyle Busch and Joey Logano.

In the final regular-season race at Richmond, Truex was in the midst of a fierce battle for the final Wildcard spot, eventually coming out over Ryan Newman by a tiebreaker. As Newman and Truex each had one win, the Wildcard spot went to Truex, for having a better number of top-five finishes than Newman; however on Monday evening, it was announced that due to MWR having attempted to manipulate the results of the race, points penalties were assessed – fifty points for Truex, Clint Bowyer and Brian Vickers each – that resulted in Truex being bumped from the Chase and Newman and Jeff Gordon being added to the Chase field, as well as probation for all three crew chiefs, suspension of Ty Norris, and a $300,000 fine. In the final ten races of the season, Truex had four top-ten finishes, which included a top-five run at Homestead.

=== 2014–2018: Furniture Row Racing ===
==== 2014 ====
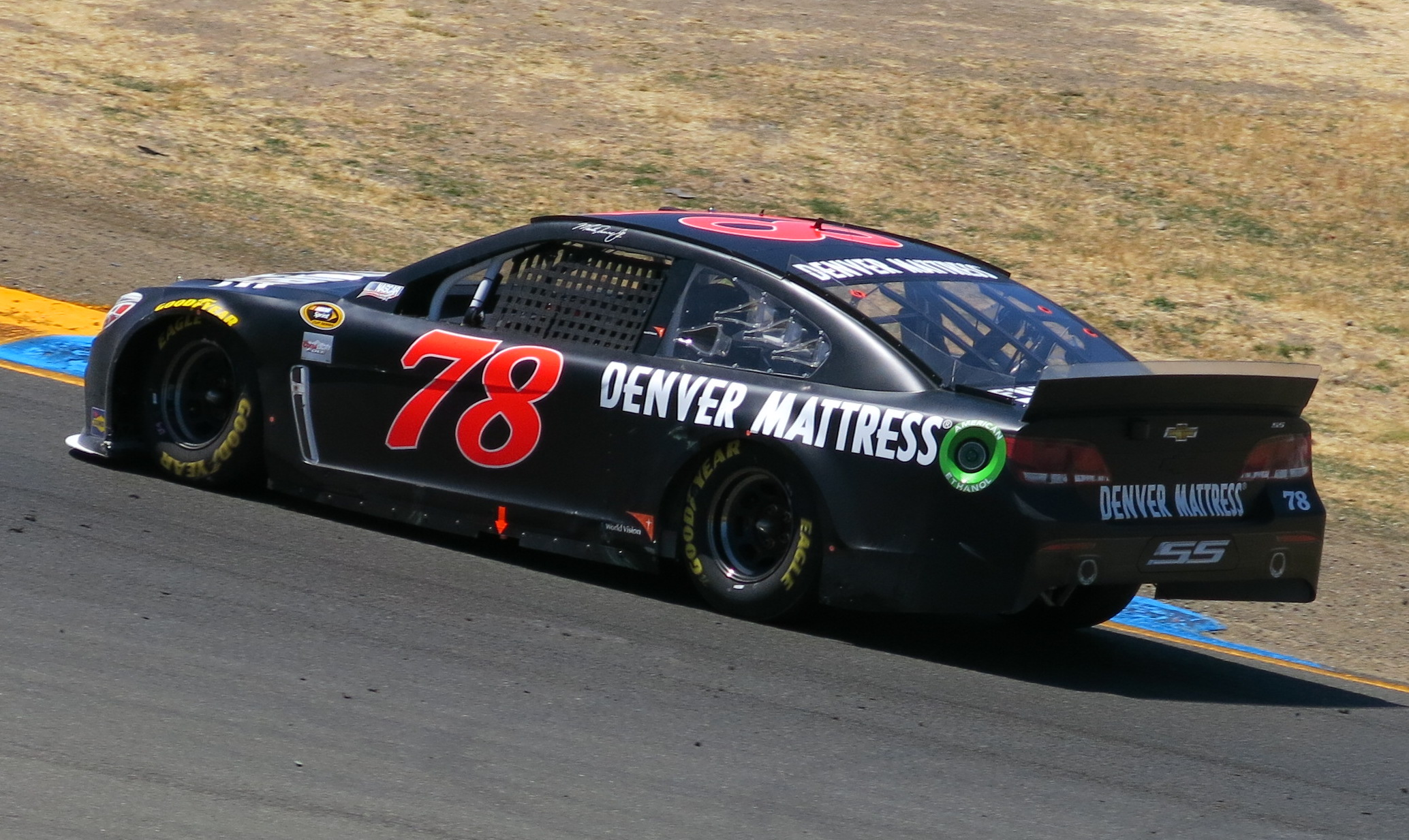
Truex racing at Sonoma Raceway in 2014

On October 14, 2013, it was announced that Michael Waltrip Racing's No. 56 would become a research and development team in 2014, and later was spun off. Truex was told he could offer his services as a driver to other teams, and on October 17 it was confirmed that for the 2014 NASCAR Sprint Cup Series season Truex would move to Furniture Row Racing and drive the No. 78 Chevrolet being vacated by Kurt Busch. When the deal was formally announced on November 1, 2013, before the Texas race, it was announced that Furniture Row had also signed on all of the members of Truex's MWR pit crew.

Truex's 2014 season started with an outside pole qualifying run for the Daytona 500, Furniture Row Racing's first front row start in the 500. However, Truex's engine failed on lap 31.

Truex did poorly in the spring but rebounded with four top-10s in the latter part of the season. He only led a single lap (at Talladega in the October race) and finished 24th in the final points standings.

==== 2015: First Championship Four appearance ====
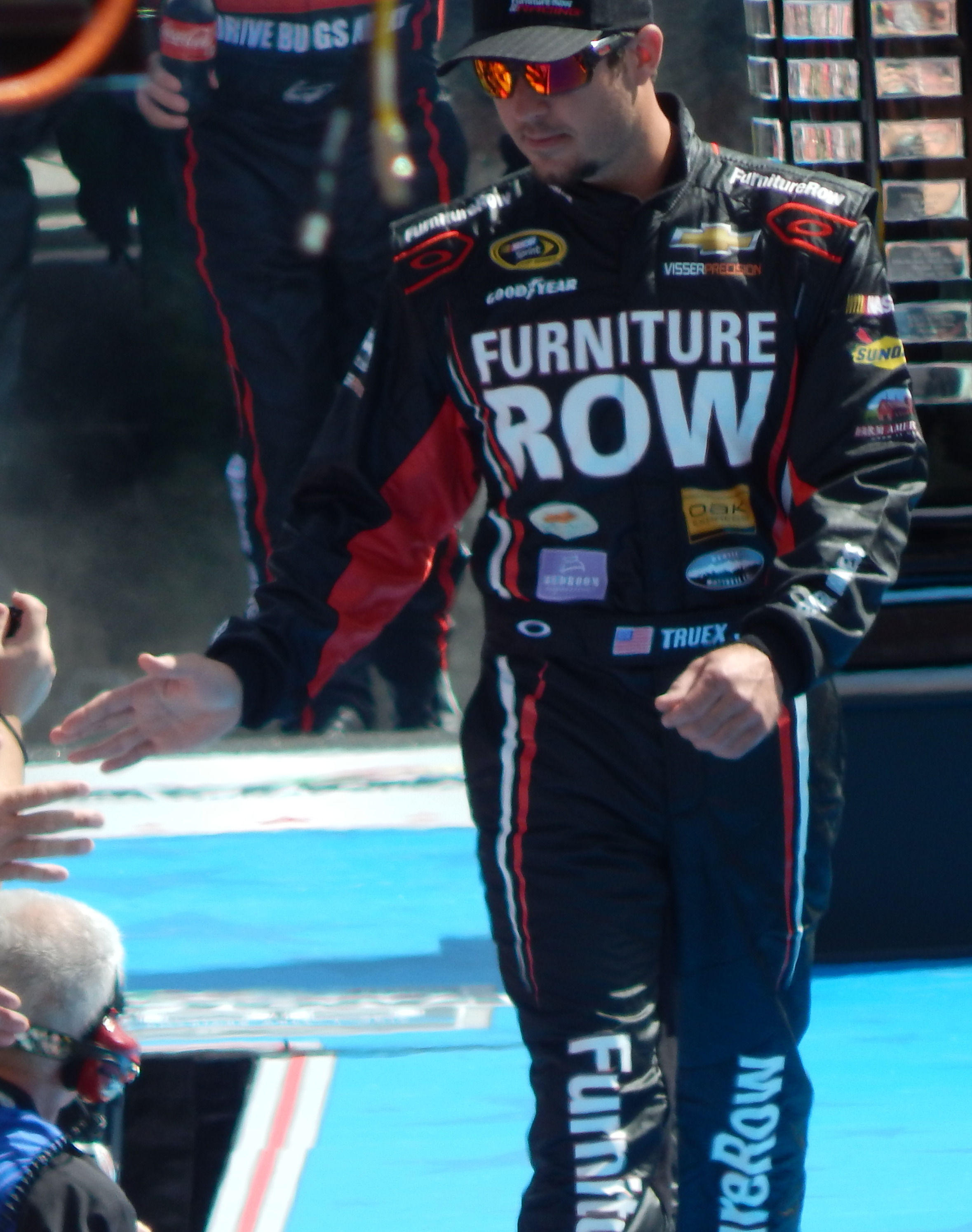
Truex Jr. at the 2015 Daytona 500

Before the 2015 season, crew chief Todd Berrier was released and replaced with rookie crew chief Cole Pearn.

Truex's season began on a high note. He led the most laps of the Sprint Unlimited (28 of 75). He led late, but after a late-race red flag period erased his five-second lead on Joey Logano, Truex lost his rhythm and finished second to Matt Kenseth. In a post-race interview, an emotional Truex said, "We needed this. The race was over once Kenseth pulled away from me. But we needed this. After the last year and a half that I've had this satisfies a lot."

Truex continued his good momentum, finishing in the top-ten in fourteen of the first fifteen races, including a runner-up at Las Vegas. His only poor finish during this period was a 29th-place finish at Bristol, seven laps down, after being swept up in a late-race accident. At Kansas, Truex led the most laps (95), but a late caution killed his chances as he slipped back to ninth on the final restart and he was unable to make up enough ground to catch Jimmie Johnson.

At the Coca-Cola 600, Truex led the most laps (131 of 400), but with twenty laps to go, he had to make a late-race fuel stop and finished fifth. At Dover, Truex led the most laps again (131 of 405), but a poor restart caused him to slide back to seventh and cost him the race to Johnson.

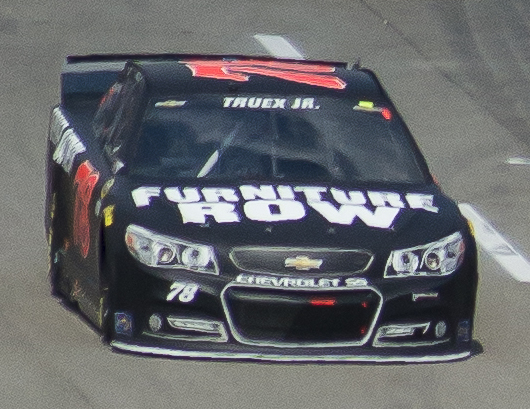
Truex Jr. racing at Michigan International Speedway in 2015

At Pocono, Truex started third and ran up front for most of the race, leading 97 of 160 laps. On the last restart, he managed to pull away to a 1.8-second lead on Kevin Harvick to take the checkered flag in 1st place. For Truex, this snapped a 69-race winless streak and was also the fourth straight points race in which he led the most laps. It was the second win for Furniture Row Racing and the first for crew chief Cole Pearn.

With a third-place finish in a rain-shortened Michigan race, Truex became the first driver since Richard Petty in 1969 to start a Cup season with fourteen top-ten finishes through the first fifteen races. At Sonoma, Truex was running in the top-twenty until shortly after the first restart, when David Ragan turned him in the esses, which saw Truex crash into a jersey barrier, resulting in a 42nd-place finish. At Daytona, Truex was running up front until he was caught up in a crash on lap 106, relegating him to a 38th-place finish. Despite a string of bad races, Truex nonetheless made the Chase for the Sprint Cup and advanced through the first two rounds of the Chase. He also advanced to the final four at Homestead-Miami and went on to finish fourth in the final point standings, a then-career best for both him and FRR.

==== 2016 ====
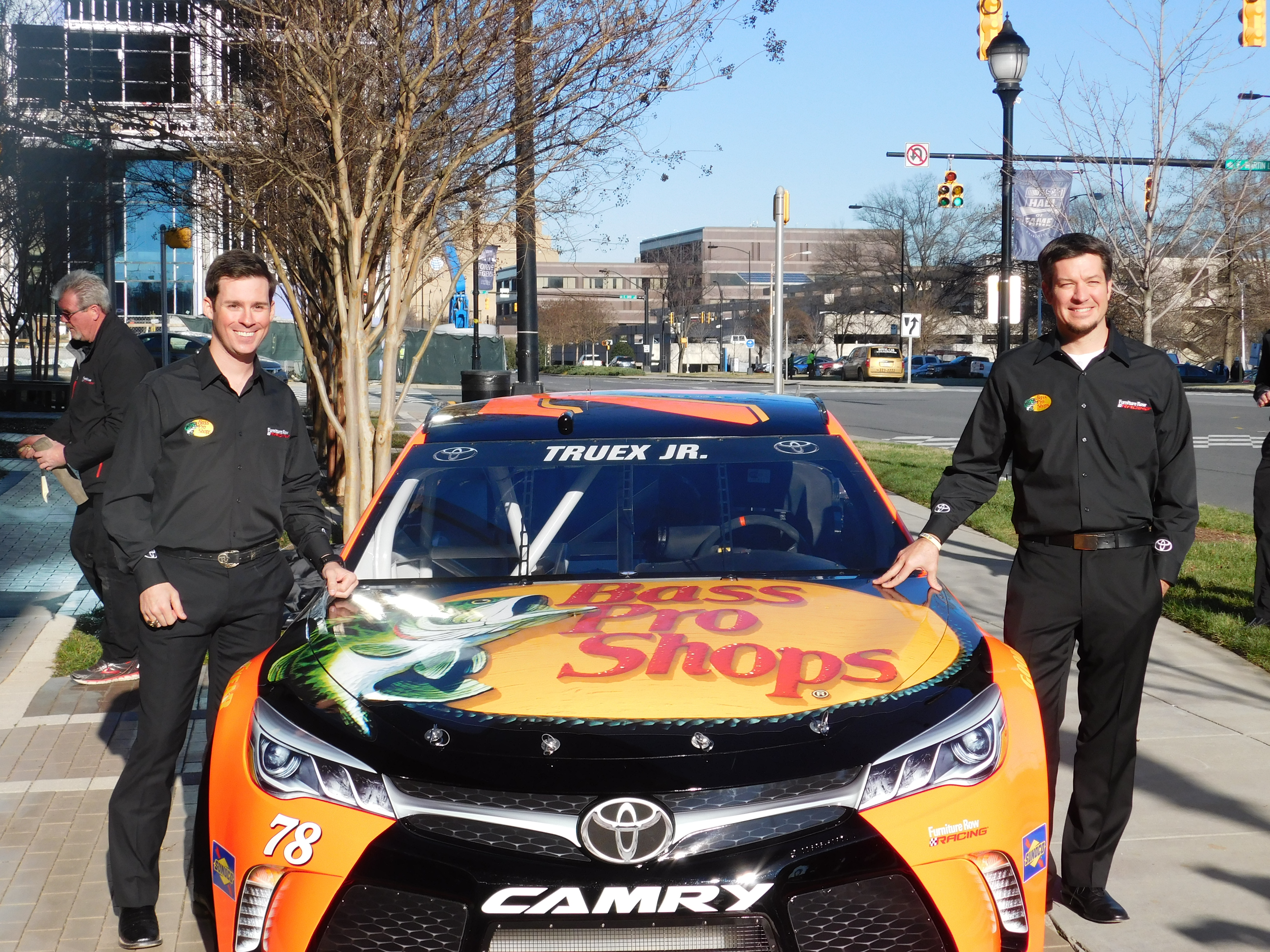
Truex's No. 78 Bass Pro Shops Toyota in 2016

Prior to the season, Furniture Row switched manufacturers from Chevrolet to Toyota. Bass Pro Shops signed on as a sponsor to the No. 78, reuniting with Truex for the first time since Truex's time with DEI. Truex started the 2016 season qualifying 28th for the Daytona 500 and ran up front for most of the day. On the last lap of the Daytona 500, he was positioned behind race leader Matt Kenseth. Heading into turn three, Denny Hamlin got a big run on Kenseth and tried to pass him, but Matt went up to block Hamlin but nearly wrecked in the process and ended up losing the draft, leaving Truex as the leading car. After a ferocious race to the finish line, Truex lost by 0.010 seconds to Denny Hamlin in the closest Daytona 500 finish in history.

Truex dominated at Texas, leading 141 of 334 laps, but lost after not making a pit stop with less than 39 laps to go. At Kansas in May, Truex won his first pole of the year and first pole in 147 races in the Sprint Cup for the running of the Go Bowling 400. Truex led a race-high 172 laps but a loose wheel relegated him to a fourteenth-place finish. He won his second pole of the season for the Coca-Cola 600. On May 29—Sunday of Memorial Day weekend, 2016—Truex dominated, leading a record 392 of 400 laps in the Coca-Cola 600 at Charlotte Motor Speedway, surpassing the old record of 335 laps set by Jim Paschal in 1967. The win was Truex's first of 2016, clinching a place in the Chase for the Sprint Cup at the end of the season. He led the race for 588 miles, the most miles led by any driver in any NASCAR race ever.

On September 4, in the Bojangles' Southern 500 at Darlington Raceway, Truex won his second race of the year. With 20 laps to go, Truex was on point with Kevin Harvick and Kyle Larson chasing from behind. With nineteen laps to go, Harvick and Larson found themselves five seconds behind the leader when a caution came out for a hard wreck by Aric Almirola in the No. 43 machine. With seventeen laps to go, the field hit pit road for the final time, with Truex Jr. winning the battle off pit road. The final restart came with twelve laps to go, and immediately Harvick and Larson battled quickly before Harvick eventually took second and then set sail to catch Truex. Luckily For Truex, however, Harvick could not match the number 78 car and Truex would go on to win the Southern 500.

2016 became the first multi-win season of his career. Truex would advance to the next round of the Chase at Chicagoland. Truex led 32 of the final fifty laps and appeared set to finish second behind Chase Elliott. After a caution with ten laps left erased Elliott's three-second lead, Truex and Elliott pitted. Truex used the advantage of his fresh tires and passed rookie Ryan Blaney on the final restart, winning the race, his third win of the season. In New Hampshire, Truex had a great car all day and would lead the most laps, but towards the end, his tires would wear, and a few late-race cautions came out, so he would lose the lead. Eventually, Kevin Harvick would win, and Truex would finish seventh.

The next week, coming back to Dover, Truex would once again have a great car and would lead the most laps, and would get his fourth win of the season and seventh win of his career after the other dominant driver Jimmie Johnson had a pit road mistake and would be advanced into round 2 of the Chase after his Chicagoland win. He would eventually get eliminated in the Round of 12 after his engine blew up in the elimination race at Talladega, and some poor performances in the Round of 12.

==== 2017: Championship year ====
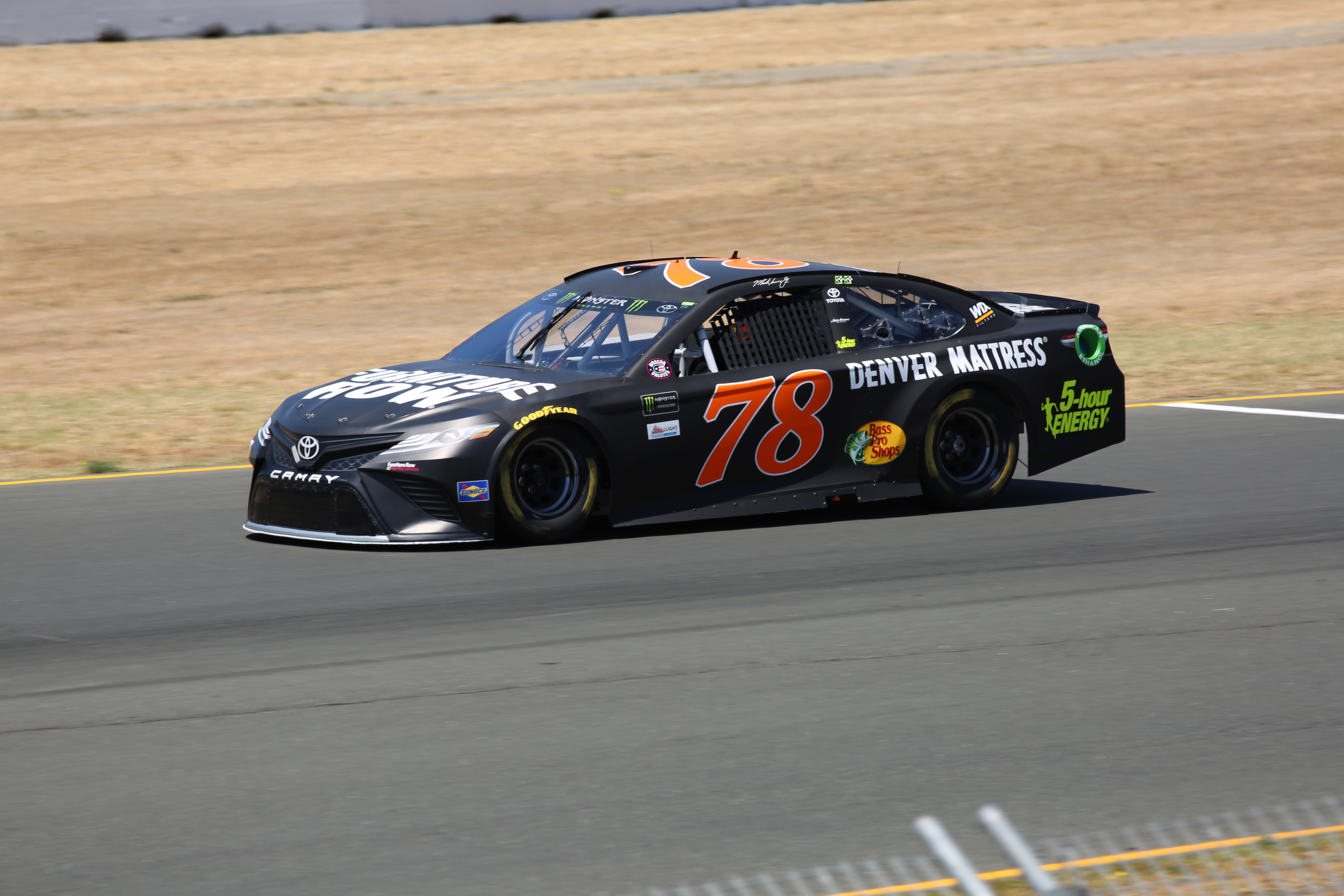
Truex during qualifying for the 2017 Toyota/Save Mart 350

Truex started the 2017 season off by winning the Kobalt 400 at Las Vegas Motor Speedway. This was Toyota's first win of the season with the new 2018 Camry and Truex's first career win at Las Vegas. He also became the first driver to win all three stages of the new stage format that was introduced for 2017.

At Kansas in May 2017, Truex started fourth. The race was primarily a duel between him and Ryan Blaney. Truex held off Blaney, Kevin Harvick, and a hard-charging Brad Keselowski on three restarts to win the race. At Charlotte, he led the most laps once again, becoming only the second man to lead the most laps in three straight Coca-Cola 600 races, yet only winning one. He tied Darrell Waltrip's record. At Michigan, he won two more stage wins, becoming the first and fastest person to ever win 10 stage wins, where nobody else has won more than four, or any other team's combined stage wins. In July, Truex captured his third win of the season, dominating the Quaker State 400 at Kentucky Speedway. He again won all three stages, leading 152 of 267 laps. With two laps to go, Truex had a 14-second lead before a late caution set up an overtime finish. Despite each of the other seven cars behind him pitting during the caution, Truex held off Kyle Busch and Kyle Larson on older tires before a wreck behind the lead pack brought out another yellow flag, this one ending the race.

Truex took home his fourth win of the season in August, winning the I Love New York 355 at The Glen, capturing his first win at Watkins Glen International Speedway. After finishing second in the first two segments of the race, Truex took the lead with 36 laps to go from Brad Keselowski but relinquished the top two spots to Keselowski and Ryan Blaney to save fuel. The strategy paid off, as Keselowski went to pit road with five laps remaining, while Blaney went one lap later, giving Truex the lead. He was able to make it to the finish, holding off Matt Kenseth as he was running out of fuel for his second career road course victory. It was an emotional win for the #78 team, as Pollex returned to victory lane with Truex after missing the Kentucky win due to a cancer recurrence, while his crew chief, Cole Pearn, helped earn the win while coping with the loss of his best friend, Jacob Damen.

Two races later at the 2017 Bass Pro Shops NRA Night Race at Bristol Motor Speedway, Truex had a chance to clinch the first regular-season title in NASCAR history if he left with a points lead of 120 points or greater. However, Truex struggled during the early stages of the race and finished 21st.

Following an off-week, Truex raced in the Bojangles Southern 500 at Darlington with another chance to wrap up the regular season crown a week before the finale at Richmond. In stage one, Truex ran down Kyle Larson with under a lap to go to win his sixteenth stage of the year. The exciting finish earned him his 35th playoff point of the season. After being behind both Larson and Denny Hamlin early in the second stage, Truex was able to find the lead and took the stage victory under caution after an accident occurred with three laps to go. The stage win also clinched Truex the regular-season championship and the additional fifteen playoff points that go with the title. Truex seemed to have optimal timing again near the finish, springing to the lead shortly after the final exchange of pit stops in the closing 102-lap run of green-flag racing. However, Denny Hamlin gradually chopped into the lead, setting up a potential classic contest for the lead. With three laps to go, Truex's tire gave way, allowing Hamlin to scoot by and grab his second win of the season. Despite this, Truex clinched the regular-season championship.

Before being awarded the regular-season championship at Richmond, Truex dominated the Federated Auto Parts 400, leading 50% of the race. However, his race derailed when Denny Hamlin wrecked him on the final restart. Truex, though clinching the regular-season championship, expressed discontent with the 1990 Daytona 500 champion, Derrike Cope, who caused a caution that changed the outcome of the race, leading up to the wreck. The regular-season championship was Truex's first top-level championship in his Cup Series career.

Truex started the playoffs on a high note, winning the first race of the playoffs, and his fifth win of the season at Chicagoland Speedway despite a pit road speeding penalty early in the race. That win allowed Truex to secure a spot for the Round of 12. He later earned himself a 5th-place finish at New Hampshire Motor Speedway, although being involved in an eight-car pileup with minor damage midway through the race.

To start the Round of 12, Truex scored his sixth win of the season at Charlotte after leading 91 out of 334 laps to secure a spot for the Round of 8. Just two weeks later, he scored another win at Kansas despite having a restart violation early in the race, that win extends his active win streak in 1.5-mile tracks to four, a NASCAR record. The next week, Truex came second to Kevin Harvick in Texas Fall race, snapping the streak at the final 1.5. mile track race in the season. After the Texas Chase race, Truex made the final four in the playoffs by points. He ultimately won the final race at Miami, becoming the 2017 champion, and won nineteen of 108 stages, capping off one of the most dominant seasons in recent history.

==== 2018: Final year at Furniture Row ====
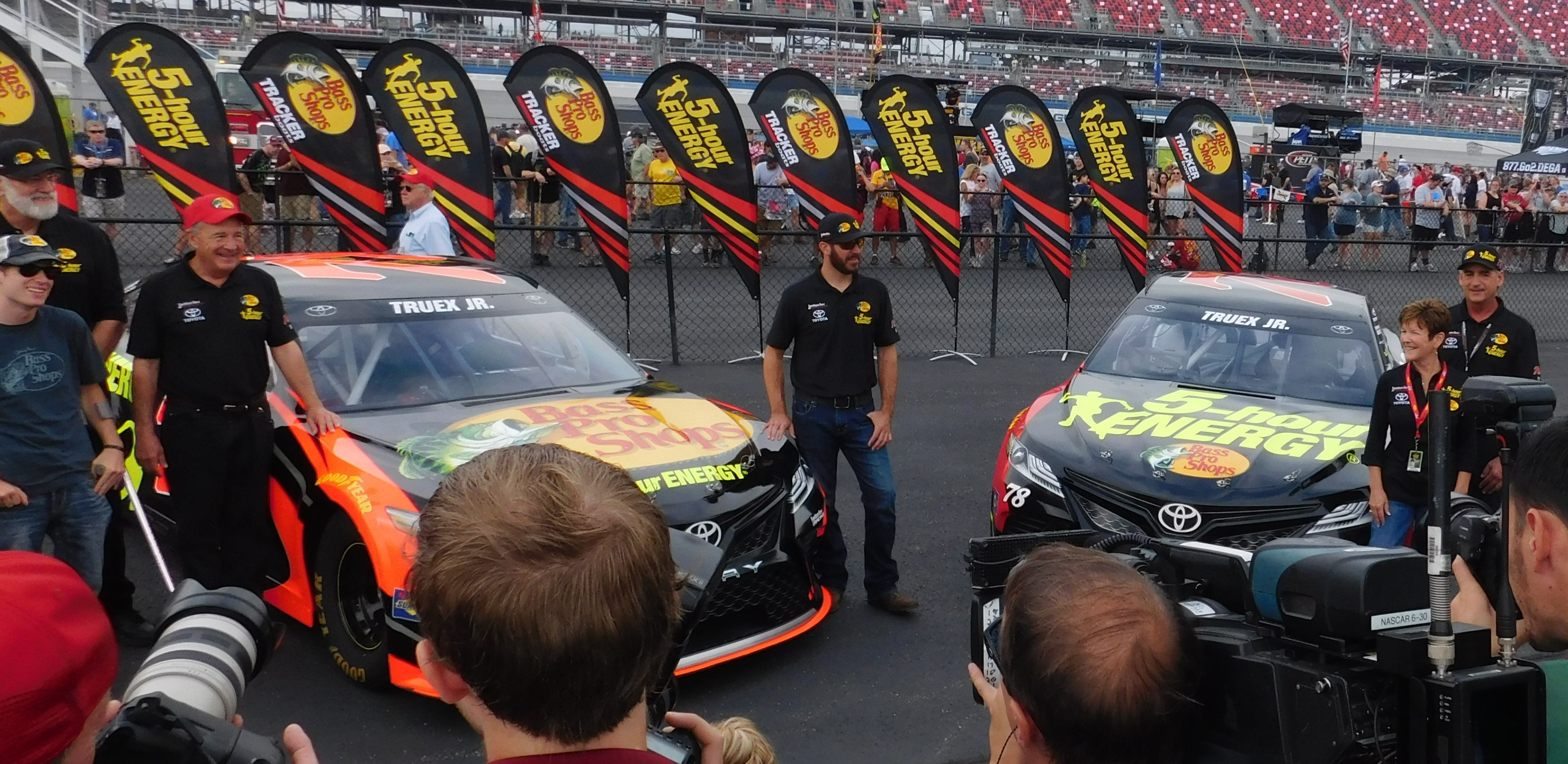
Truex standing next to his 2018 race cars with sponsorships from Bass Pro Shops and 5-Hour Energy

Truex started off the season with an 18th-place finish at the 2018 Daytona 500, after being caught up in a late-race wreck. For the next few weeks, Truex picked up Top 5 finishes for the next five straight races, including two poles, and a dominant win at Fontana, sweeping the stages, leading 125 of the 200 laps with a 11.685 second margin of victory. He continued this consistency with wins at Pocono, Sonoma, and another stage sweep, this time at Kentucky and 15 Top 5's during the regular season.

Truex added two top-five finishes during first round of the Playoffs. At the cut-off race at Charlotte, for the inaugural running of the ROVAL layout, Truex was leading heading into the final chicane when second place Jimmie Johnson locked the rear brakes, spinning into Truex. Neither driver was able to recover from the spin, ceding the win to Ryan Blaney. Truex would score another top-five in the second round, making it to the round of 8. In the opening race of the Round of 8 at Martinsville, Truex was battling late with the Team Penske cars of Joey Logano and Brad Keselowski. Truex would clear Logano in turn 1 on the white flag lap. Going into turn 4 Logano would bump Truex and door him down the straightaway, making the 78 car lose and giving Logano the win and a guaranteed spot in the Championship 4. In post-race interviews Truex said: "He may have won the battle, but he ain't winning the damn war" referring to the championship that would be contested three weeks later. Truex would make the Championship 4 for the second year in a row and third time in his career. He finished 2nd at Homestead to Joey Logano and in the final points standings.

Truex was part of what was called "The Big Three" in 2018 consisting of Kevin Harvick, Kyle Busch and Truex. The three drivers would combine to win 20 of the 36 races and 35 stages, swapping the points-lead for most of the year but ultimately losing the championship to Logano.

On September 4, 2018, it was announced that Furniture Row Racing would be folding the No. 78 team following the conclusion of the 2018 season. On November 7, 2018, with Furniture Row Racing closing at the end of 2018, it was announced Truex and crew chief Cole Pearn signed a deal with Joe Gibbs Racing to drive the No. 19 starting in the 2019 season, replacing Daniel Suárez and crew chief Dave Rogers.

=== 2019–2024: Joe Gibbs Racing ===
==== 2019 ====
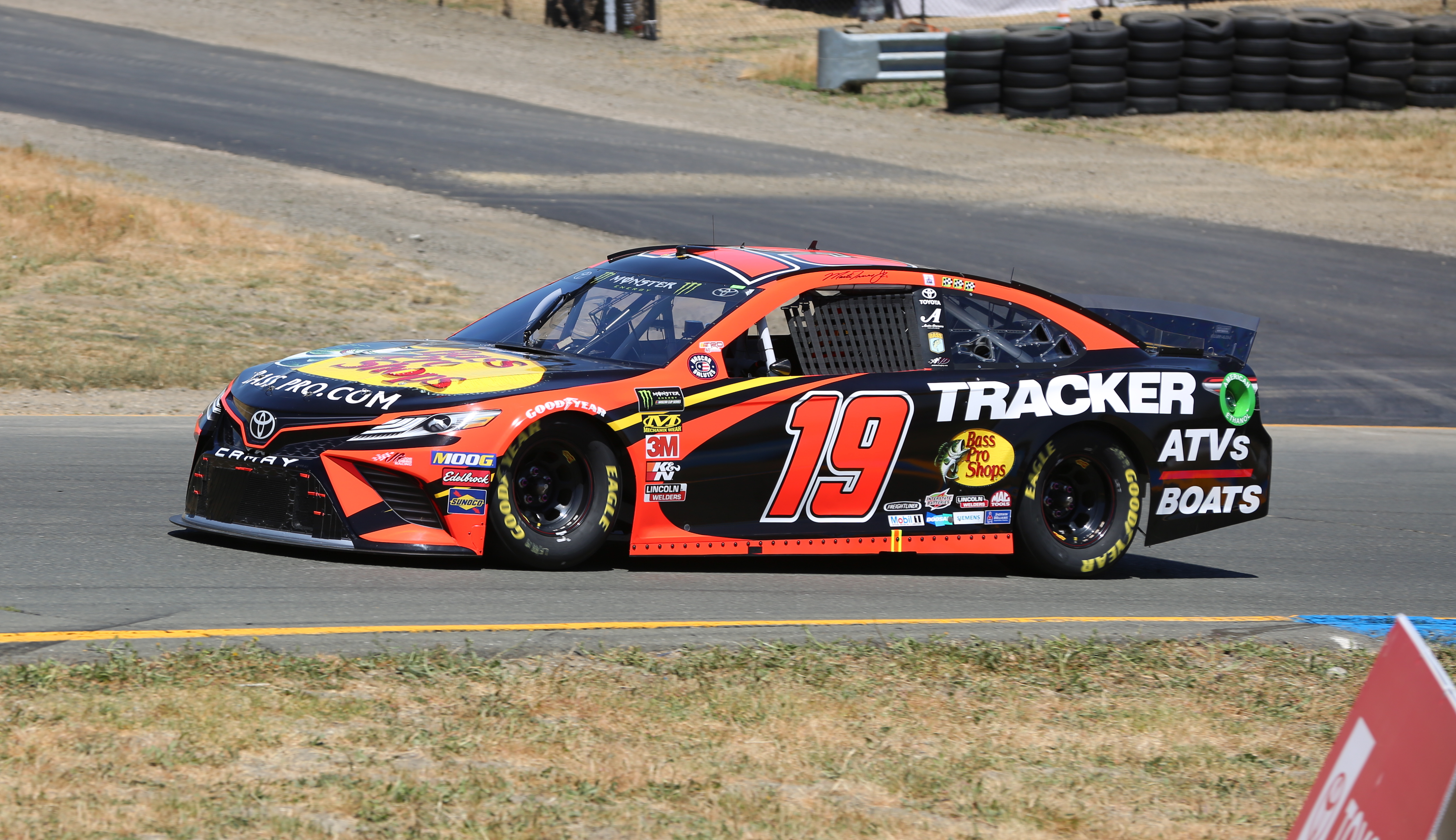
Truex's race-winning car during the 2019 Toyota/Save Mart 350

Truex started his first season with JGR with a 35th-place finish at the 2019 Daytona 500, but he made up for that loss with five straight top-tens and two top-twenties before scoring four wins at Richmond (his first Cup win on a short track), Dover, Charlotte, and Sonoma. He began the 2019 playoffs by winning the first two races at Las Vegas and Richmond (his first back-to-back career victories and season "sweep" at Richmond) and advancing to the Round of 12 after finishing seventh at the Charlotte Roval. During the Round of 8, Truex won at Martinsville to secure his position in the Championship 4. At the season finale at Homestead-Miami Speedway, Truex dominated the first half of the race, winning the first stage and leading into green flag pit stops at the midpoint of stage 2. However, the race and championship hopes unraveled due to a miscue during the pit stop, in which the left and right front tires were switched around and installed on the incorrect sides. The pit road error forced an unscheduled stop and rendered Truex a lap down for much of the second stage. He recovered and began to rally back through the field, but could not overcome the loss of track position, ultimately finishing second in the race to teammate Kyle Busch and the final championship standings for the second season in a row. Truex led the series in victories with seven. Truex was also the first driver to lead the series in wins after switching to a new team since Matt Kenseth in 2013, who also did it with Joe Gibbs Racing.

On December 9, after serving as Truex's crew chief for six seasons, Pearn announced he had parted ways with JGR to pursue opportunities outside the sport.

==== 2020 ====
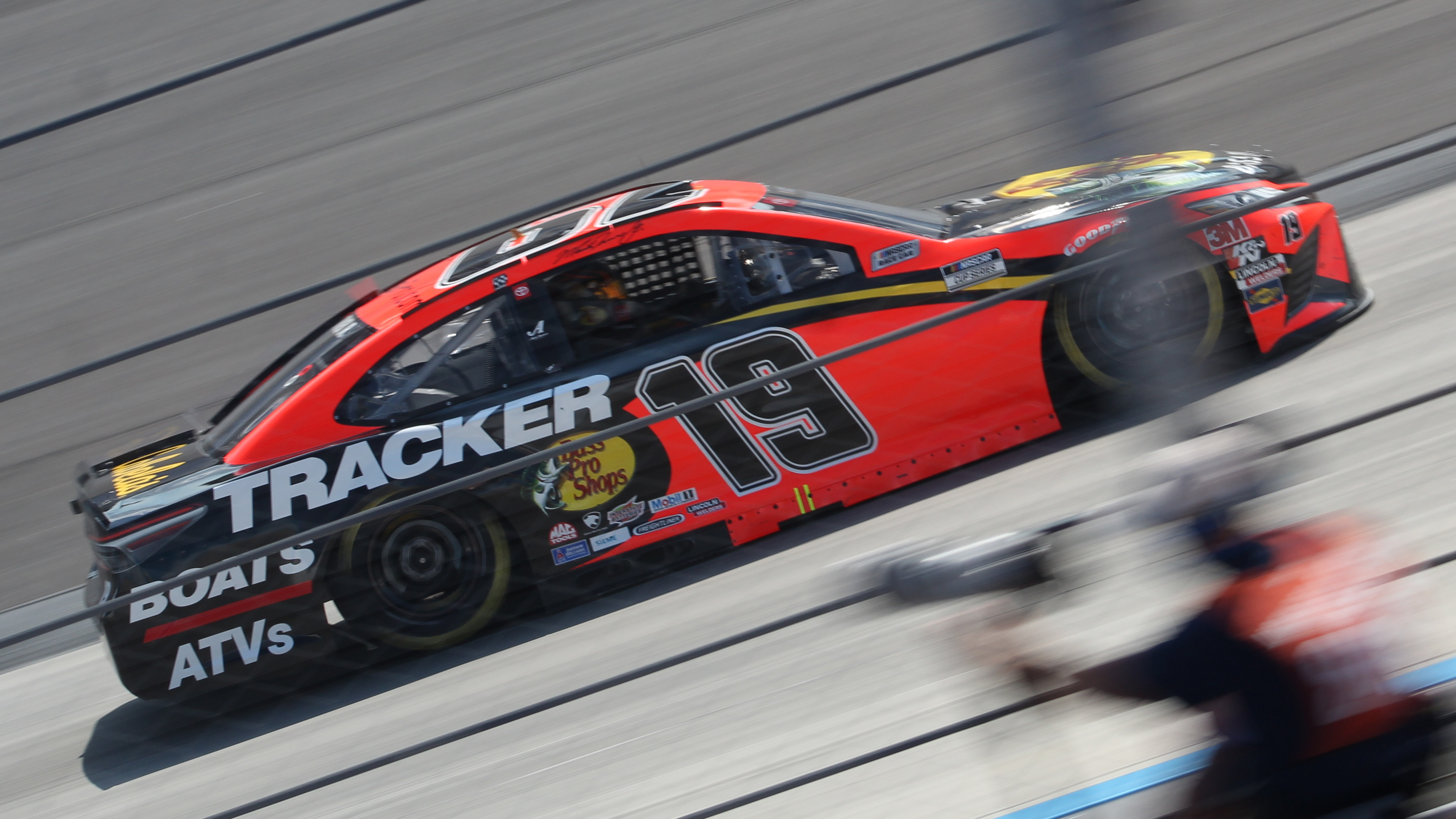
Truex competing in the 2020 Doubleheader Dover Weekend

At Martinsville in June, Truex controlled the final one-hundred laps and won his only race of the season after early-race damage to the front of his car prevented the right-front tire and brake pads from overheating. Truex dominated the final laps of the race at Kentucky but was the victim of a last-lap pass by Cole Custer, the second time in three years that Truex was passed on the final lap by a driver in their first career win. From Kansas in late July to Daytona at the end of the regular season he would score eight consecutive top-fives including five straight finishes of third. In the first race of the playoffs Truex would lead the most laps at Darlington but had to pit after late race contact with Chase Elliott, finishing 22nd. Truex missed the Championship 4 for the first time since 2016 and finished seventh in points.

==== 2021 ====
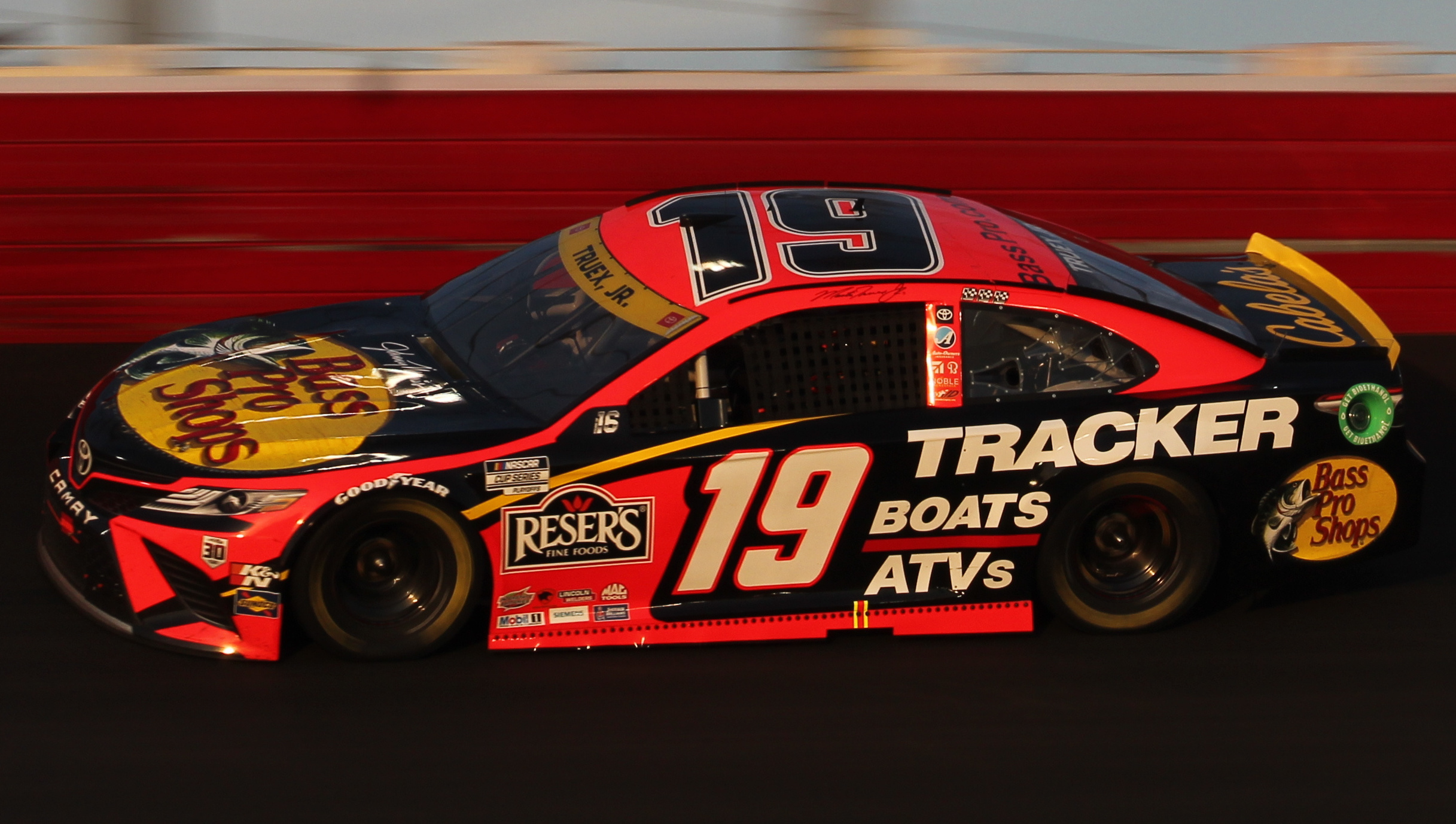
Truex racing at Darlington Raceway in 2021

Despite only scoring one win in their first season paired together, Truex remained with crew chief James Small, even amidst a crew chief shakeup at JGR that year. He won his first race of the season at Phoenix in March, which was his first victory at the track.

In March, Truex made his return to both the Xfinity Series and the Truck Series. He drove JGR's No. 54 at Atlanta in March for his first Xfinity start since 2010 when he drove multiple races for MWR in their No. 00 and No. 99 cars. Truex drove in the Truck Series' Bristol dirt race in the No. 51 for Kyle Busch Motorsports in preparation for the Cup Series race on the same track, new to the schedule, that weekend. It was his first Truck start since 2006, coincidentally also in the No. 51, but he ran for Billy Ballew Motorsports in 2006. He won the race for his first truck series win, becoming the 36th driver to win in all three top NASCAR Series. Despite leading the most laps (122) at the Cup event, Truex would finish 19th after a cut tire with two laps to go while running in third.

Two weeks later, Truex won at Martinsville for the third time in his career, his sixth win on a short track, and became the first driver to win multiple races in 2021.

On May 9, Truex dominated and won the Goodyear 400 at Darlington, earning his thirtieth career victory, and his second at the famed track, remaining the only driver with multiple wins through 12 races.

At New Hampshire Motor Speedway, Truex was running second when the rain hit the track, causing him, Kyle Busch, and Denny Hamlin to crash. He soon rebounded to finish 12th in the same race, which was shortened due to darkness.

During the rest of the season, he would continue to perform to the best of his ability for the next three races after that, earning a third-place finish at Watkins Glen International. Truex was involved in a wreck at the Indianapolis Motor Speedway road course late in the race when the turn 6 curb started to separate, but managed to finish fifteenth. He also scored a top-ten at Michigan International Speedway.

Truex was involved in the big one at the Coke Zero Sugar 400 at Daytona International Speedway, resulting in a 29th-place finish. When the Playoffs started, he scored one win at Richmond Raceway, despite jumping the initial start, a top-five at Darlington Raceway, and a top-ten at Bristol Motor Speedway.

In the second round of the playoffs, he would finish fourth at Las Vegas Motor Speedway, twelfth at Talladega Superspeedway, and 29th at the Charlotte Motor Speedway Roval.

In the final round of the playoffs at Texas Motor Speedway, Truex got loose in turns 3 and 4, snapping the car around and causing him to slam into the outside wall. He would be scored 25th as a result of said crash. However, he would gather enough points and positions in the next two races at Kansas Speedway and Martinsville Speedway, finishing seventh and fourth respectively, giving him just enough points to advance into the Championship 4. It was his fifth Final 4 appearance tying for most all time at 5 with Kyle Busch and Kevin Harvick.

In the Championship Race at Phoenix Raceway, Truex would be in 1st-place for a small portion of the end of the race, looking to secure a second title. With just under thirty laps to go, the caution came out because of David Starr putting debris on the racetrack after cutting a tire. Truex would lose the lead on pitstops after. Truex tried his best to overtake the top contender, Kyle Larson, as the laps kept winding down, but ultimately finished second in points after coming up just short of winning. This was the third time in Truex's NASCAR Cup Series career that he finished second in points.

==== 2022: Championship 4 to missing the playoffs ====
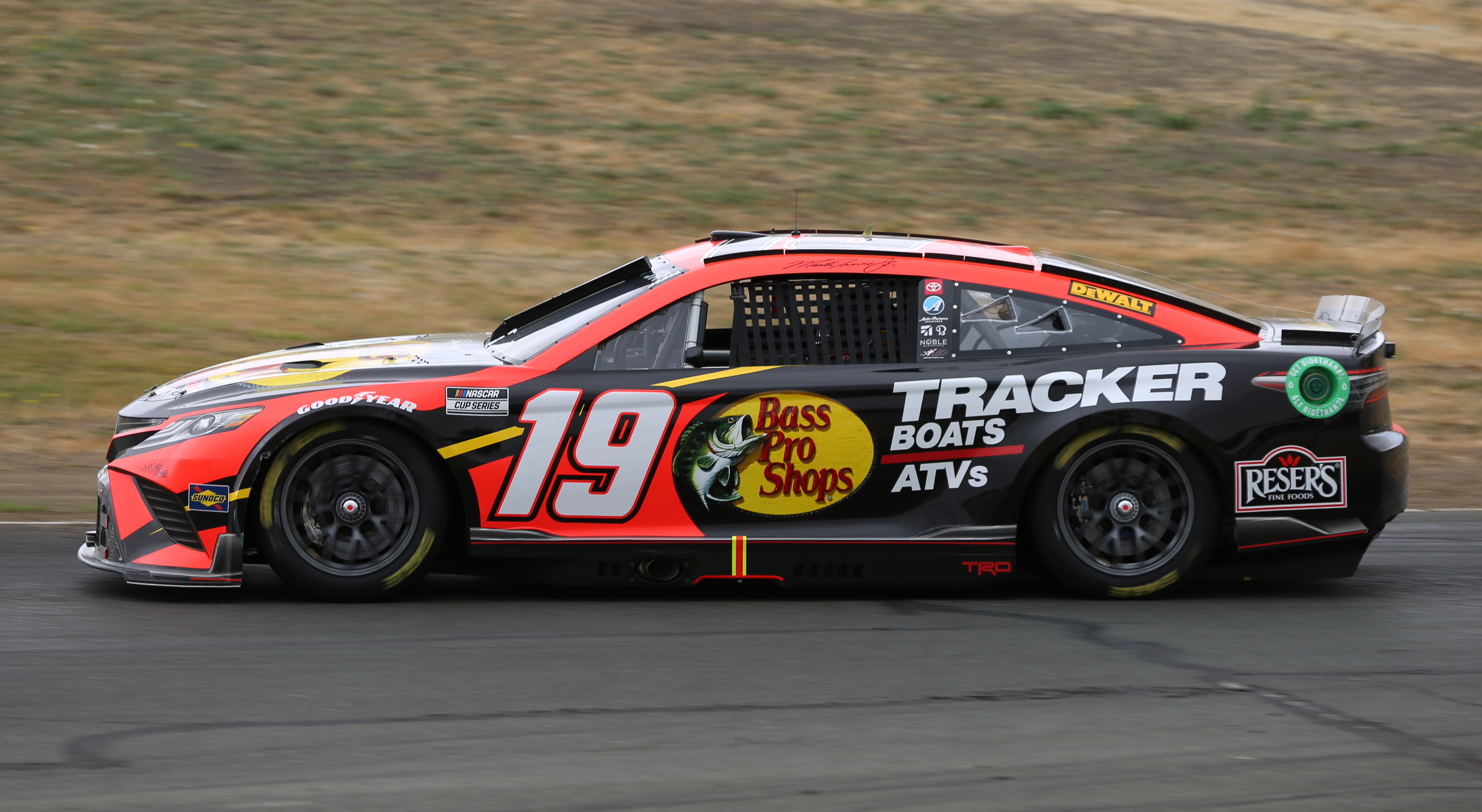
Truex's No. 19 car at Sonoma Raceway in 2022

Truex started the 2022 season with a thirteenth-place finish at the 2022 Daytona 500 after winning the first two stages. He was winless through the regular season, but he stayed consistent with three top-fives and twelve top-ten finishes. In June, Truex expressed uncertainty about his future in the NASCAR Cup Series with him debating over if he would retire or stay with JGR. He would ultimately choose to stay with JGR and run the 2023 season. He scored his first pole for Joe Gibbs Racing at New Hampshire in July and would dominate the first two thirds of the race before losing ground on pit strategy and finishing fourth. Despite leading the season in stage wins (seven) and being fourth in the regular season standings at the conclusion of the August Daytona race, Truex missed the playoffs for the first time since 2014 after finishing eighth, three points behind Ryan Blaney for the sixteenth and final playoff spot as Austin Dillon won the race to become the sixteenth different race winner of the season. Truex went winless and finished seventeenth in the final standings.

==== 2023: Return to form ====
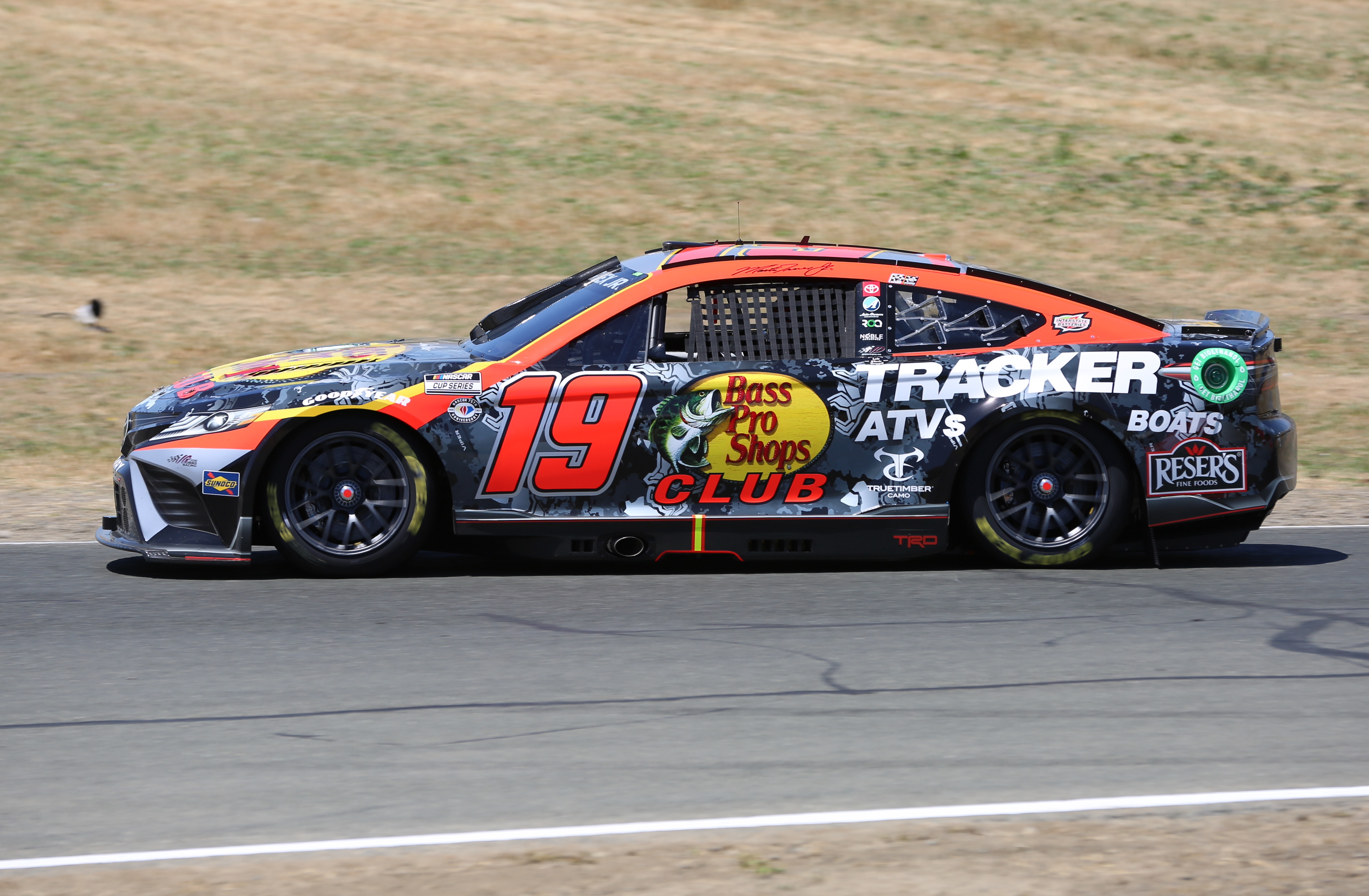
Truex's race-winning car during the 2023 Toyota/Save Mart 350

Truex began the 2023 season by winning the 2023 Busch Light Clash at The Coliseum. He broke a 54-race winless streak at Dover to make the playoffs. Truex wood capture his second pole for Joe Gibbs at Darlington in the spring, leading 137 of the first 138 laps, easily winning stage 1. With 35 laps to go in stage 2 he would relinquish the lead to Ross Chastain. On the final lap of stage 2 Truex would get to the inside of Chastain in turn 3. Chastain would hit the wall bouncing into Truex who spun across the apron causing damage to his splitter. In the final stage Truex would work his way back to third until a restart with 13 to go when he squeezed Joey Logano into the wall, sparking an 8-car incident, taking himself out of the race.

Truex also scored wins at Sonoma and New Hampshire. The New Hampshire win came in classic Truex fashion as he led 254 of the 301 laps and swept the stages. It was a very important win for him as he had been coming to the track since he was a child. Prior to winning the race, Truex had the most laps at the Magic Mile without a victory. Truex would stay consistent through the summer scoring top-tens at Richmond, Indinapolis and Watkins Glen and top-fives at Charlotte, Gateway, Nashville, Pocono and Michigan. He would narrowly lose at Michigan in a late race battle with Chris Buescher after winning the first two stages.

At the conclusion of the Daytona night race, he clinched the regular season championship. On the second playoff race at Kansas, Truex experienced a puncture on his right rear tire and crashed on the third lap, finishing in last place and dropping him below the cutoff line. However, the following week at Bristol, he was able to salvage a bad night and finish two laps down in nineteenth, going above the cutoff line by five points after Joey Logano and Kevin Harvick had issues late in the race. Despite two bad finishes he made it through the Round of 12, helped by the playoff points he earned in the regular season. He quailifed on pole for second race of the round of 8 at Homestead and was in contention for a top five and the win, which would have put him within a few points of the cutline But with 32 laps to go his engine expired giving him a DNF and a 29th place finish, placing him in almost must win territory heading into Martinsville. A week later he would qualify on pole again but was eliminated from the round of 8 following Martinsville after a pit road penalty cost him an opportunity to contend for the win. He would finsih the season in 9th at Phoenix, only his second top ten of the playoffs.

==== 2024: Final full-time season ====
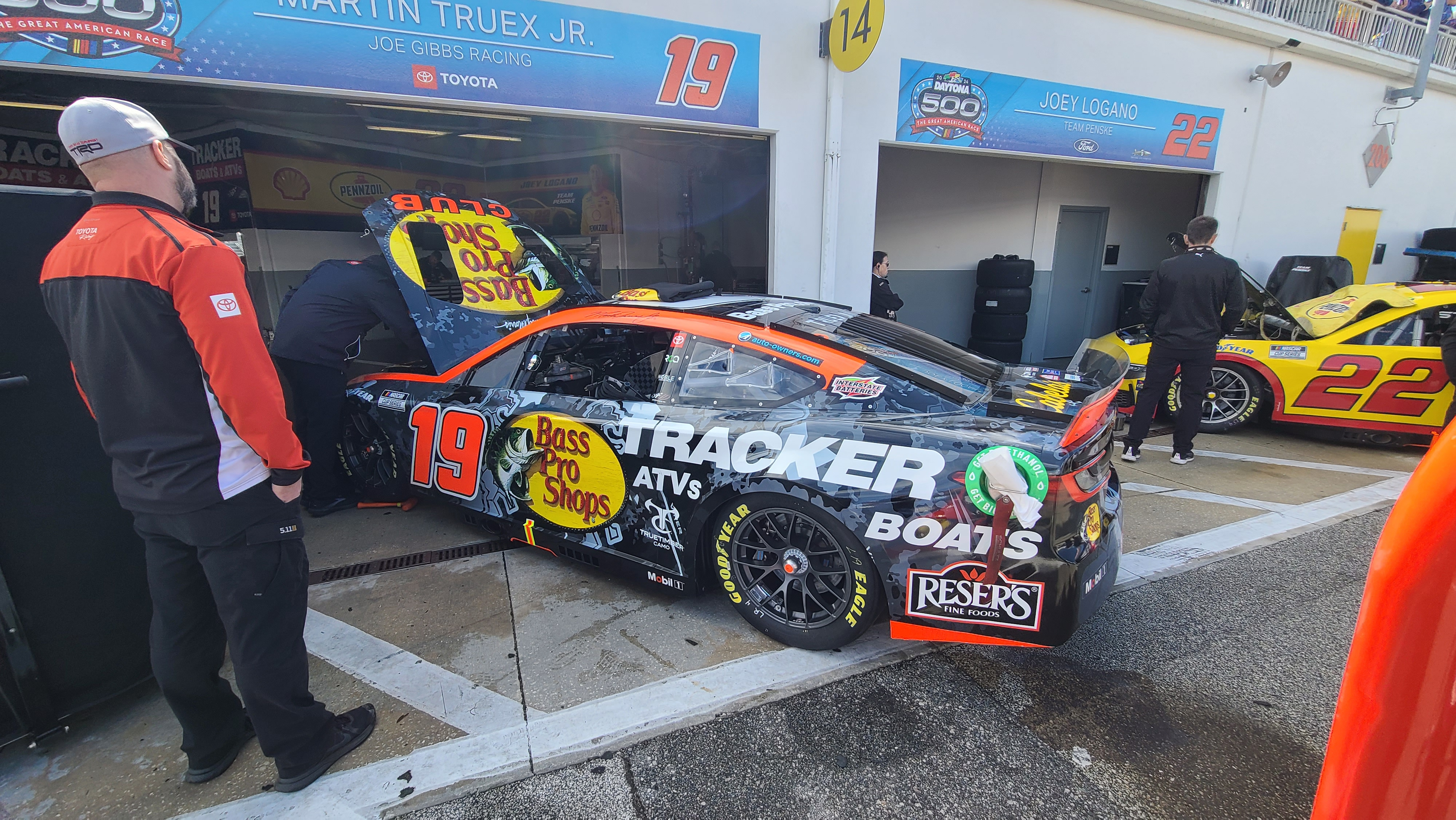
Truex Jr.'s No. 19 car in the garage area at Daytona

On August 5, 2023, Truex announced that he had signed a contract extension to remain with JGR through the 2024 season. At the spring Richmond race Truex led a race-high 228, and looked to win it, when with less than two laps to go, Bubba Wallace spun Kyle Larson. This brought out a caution which led the cars to pitroad. Truex lost the lead to Denny Hamlin on pit-road and Hamlin would then jump the ensuing resart with Truex dropping back to 4th and Hamlin winning it. Post race Hamlin was not penalized and would keep the win. It marked the 9th time since 2020 when he had led more than 100 laps in a race and the 7th time in those 9 races were he failed to win the race. Despite not winning the race Truex held the points lead after 6 top-ten finishes in a row. At Kansas Truex was on the winning strategy with the fastest car, closing quickly on the leader Denny Hamlin with less than 10 to go, cutting the lead by two seconds in three laps, down to less than 8 tenths, when Kyle Busch spun with 7 to go. This forced the race into overtime and brought the cars down pit-road. Truex team elected for 4 tires and came out tenth, the first car on four tires. Truex quickly made his way through the field but only reached fourth in the two-lap overtime.

On June 14, 2024, Truex announced he would retire from full-time racing at the end of the season. Despite not winning a race during the regular season, he stayed consistent enough to make the playoffs. Truex was eliminated from the playoffs at the conclusion of the Round of 16 after a pit-road speeding-penalty took him out of the top-five and a spot in the Round of 12. He would close the season with two straight poles at Martinsville and Phoenix and would lead his final laps in the finale. Despite being eliminated in the first round, Truex finished his final full-time season tenth in the final point standings.

==== 2025: Return to the No. 56 car ====
On January 16, 2025, it was announced that Tricon Garage would attempt to make its NASCAR Cup Series debut in the 2025 Daytona 500. The team fielded the No. 56 Toyota Camry, driven by Truex, with Bass Pro Shops as the primary sponsor and Cole Pearn serving as the crew chief. This would be Truex's first time back in the No. 56 car since 2013 with Michael Waltrip Racing. He would lock himself into the race by being the fastest open car in qualifying. Truex would finish 38th after being involved in a crash.

== Personal life ==
Truex was born in Mayetta, New Jersey, a community located in Stafford Township, New Jersey. He graduated from Southern Regional High School in 1998. His late father, Martin Truex Sr., won races in the Busch North Series. His younger brother, Ryan, is a former champion in the K&N Pro Series East, and was a contender for the 2014 Rookie of the Year in the Sprint Cup.

Truex and his long time partner Sherry Pollex were together from 2005 to 2023. In 2007, they started the Martin Truex Jr. Foundation to support children with pediatric cancer. In 2014, Pollex was diagnosed with Stage III ovarian cancer. Truex announced that he and Pollex had ended their relationship on January 27, 2023. They continued to remain close friends post-breakup up until Pollex's death on September 17, 2023.

Truex is an avid fan of the Philadelphia Eagles of the National Football League and the Philadelphia Flyers of the National Hockey League.

In 2019, Truex's holding company, which holds a small aircraft fleet, entered the human organ transport business.

== Motorsports career results ==
=== Racing career summary ===
| Season | Series | Team | Races | Wins | Top 5 | Top 10 | Points | Position |
|---|---|---|---|---|---|---|---|---|
| 1999 | NASCAR Busch North Series | Truex Motorsports | 0 | 0 | 0 | 0 | 0 | N/A |
| 2000 | NASCAR Busch North Series | Truex Motorsports | 17 | 1 | 3 | 5 | 1961 | 12th |
| 2001 | NASCAR Busch North Series | Truex Motorsports | 20 | 2 | 9 | 11 | 2630 | 8th |
| 2001 | NASCAR Busch Series | Truex Motorsports | 1 | 0 | 0 | 0 | 49 | 133rd |
| 2001 | NASCAR Featherlite Modified Tour | N/A | 0 | 0 | 0 | 0 | 0 | N/A |
| 2002 | NASCAR Featherlite Modified Tour | N/A | 1 | 0 | 0 | 0 | 43 | 90th |
| 2002 | NASCAR Busch North Series | Truex Motorsports | 19 | 0 | 6 | 11 | 2416 | 11th |
| 2002 | NASCAR Busch Series | Truex Motorsports | 3 | 0 | 0 | 0 | 370 | 65th |
| 2002 | NASCAR Busch Series | Phoenix Racing | 1 | 0 | 0 | 0 | 370 | 65th |
| 2003 | NASCAR Busch North Series | Truex Motorsports | 6 | 2 | 5 | 5 | 1013 | 25th |
| 2003 | NASCAR Busch Series | Truex Motorsports | 3 | 0 | 0 | 0 | 1228 | 40th |
| 2003 | NASCAR Busch Series | Chance 2 Motorsports | 6 | 0 | 2 | 3 | 1228 | 40th |
| 2003 | NASCAR Busch Series | Stanton Barrett Motorsports | 1 | 0 | 0 | 0 | 1228 | 40th |
| 2004 | NASCAR Busch Series | Chance 2 Motorsports | 34 | 6 | 17 | 26 | 5173 | **1st** |
| 2004 | NASCAR Nextel Cup Series | Dale Earnhardt, Inc. | 2 | 0 | 0 | 0 | 119 | 70th |
| 2005 | NASCAR Craftsman Truck Series | Billy Ballew Motorsports | 1 | 0 | 0 | 0 | 106 | 77th |
| 2005 | NASCAR Busch Series | Chance 2 Motorsports | 35 | 6 | 15 | 22 | 4937 | **1st** |
| 2005 | NASCAR Nextel Cup Series | Dale Earnhardt, Inc. | 7 | 0 | 0 | 1 | 589 | 47th |
| 2005 | IROC XXIX | N/A | 4 | 1 | 4 | 4 | 68 | **2nd** |
| 2006 | NASCAR Craftsman Truck Series | Billy Ballew Motorsports | 1 | 0 | 0 | 0 | 61 | 85th |
| 2006 | NASCAR Busch Series | JR Motorsports | 3 | 1 | 2 | 2 | 835 | 50th |
| 2006 | NASCAR Busch Series | Dale Earnhardt, Inc. | 3 | 0 | 0 | 2 | 835 | 50th |
| 2006 | NASCAR Nextel Cup Series | Dale Earnhardt, Inc. | 36 | 0 | 2 | 5 | 3673 | 19th |
| 2006 | IROC XXX | N/A | 4 | 1 | 3 | 4 | 57 | **3rd** |
| 2007 | NASCAR Busch Series | Dale Earnhardt, Inc. | 3 | 0 | 1 | 2 | 370 | 84th |
| 2007 | NASCAR Nextel Cup Series | Dale Earnhardt, Inc. | 36 | 1 | 7 | 14 | 6164 | 11th |
| 2008 | NASCAR Nationwide Series | JR Motorsports | 1 | 0 | 0 | 0 | 175 | 100th |
| 2008 | NASCAR Nationwide Series | Dale Earnhardt, Inc. | 1 | 0 | 0 | 0 | 175 | 100th |
| 2008 | NASCAR Sprint Cup Series | Dale Earnhardt, Inc. | 36 | 0 | 3 | 11 | 3839 | 15th |
| 2009 | NASCAR Nationwide Series | Phoenix Racing | 2 | 0 | 0 | 1 | 265 | 88th |
| 2009 | NASCAR Sprint Cup Series | Earnhardt Ganassi Racing | 36 | 0 | 1 | 6 | 3503 | 23rd |
| 2010 | NASCAR Nationwide Series | Diamond-Waltrip Racing | 6 | 0 | 3 | 3 | 771 | 51st |
| 2010 | NASCAR Sprint Cup Series | Michael Waltrip Racing | 36 | 0 | 1 | 7 | 3916 | 22nd |
| 2011 | NASCAR Sprint Cup Series | Michael Waltrip Racing | 36 | 0 | 3 | 12 | 937 | 18th |
| 2012 | NASCAR Sprint Cup Series | Michael Waltrip Racing | 36 | 0 | 7 | 19 | 2299 | 11th |
| 2013 | NASCAR Sprint Cup Series | Michael Waltrip Racing | 36 | 1 | 7 | 15 | 998 | 16th |
| 2014 | NASCAR Sprint Cup Series | Furniture Row Racing | 36 | 0 | 1 | 5 | 857 | 24th |
| 2015 | NASCAR Sprint Cup Series | Furniture Row Racing | 36 | 1 | 8 | 22 | 5032 | 4th |
| 2016 | NASCAR Sprint Cup Series | Furniture Row Racing | 36 | 4 | 8 | 17 | 2271 | 11th |
| 2017 | Monster Energy NASCAR Cup Series | Furniture Row Racing | 36 | 8 | 19 | 26 | 5040 | **1st** |
| 2018 | Monster Energy NASCAR Cup Series | Furniture Row Racing | 36 | 4 | 20 | 21 | 5035 | **2nd** |
| 2019 | Monster Energy NASCAR Cup Series | Joe Gibbs Racing | 36 | 7 | 15 | 24 | 5035 | **2nd** |
| 2020 | NASCAR Cup Series | Joe Gibbs Racing | 36 | 1 | 14 | 23 | 2341 | 7th |
| 2021 | NASCAR Camping World Truck Series | Kyle Busch Motorsports | 1 | 1 | 1 | 1 | 0 | NC† |
| 2021 | NASCAR Xfinity Series | Joe Gibbs Racing | 1 | 0 | 1 | 1 | 0 | NC† |
| 2021 | NASCAR Cup Series | Joe Gibbs Racing | 36 | 4 | 13 | 20 | 5035 | **2nd** |
| 2022 | NASCAR Cup Series | Joe Gibbs Racing | 36 | 0 | 4 | 15 | 1037 | 17th |
| 2023 | NASCAR Cup Series | Joe Gibbs Racing | 36 | 3 | 9 | 17 | 2269 | 11th |
| 2024 | NASCAR Cup Series | Joe Gibbs Racing | 36 | 0 | 5 | 11 | 2257 | 10th |
| 2025 | NASCAR Cup Series | Tricon Garage | 1 | 0 | 0 | 0 | 1 | 42nd |

^{†} As Truex was a guest driver, he was ineligible for championship points.

=== NASCAR ===
(key) (Bold – Pole position awarded by qualifying time. Italics – Pole position earned by points standings or practice time. * – Most laps led. ** – All laps led.)

==== Cup Series ====
NASCAR Cup Series results
| Year | Team | No. | Make | 1 | 2 | 3 | 4 | 5 | 6 | 7 | 8 | 9 | 10 | 11 | 12 | 13 | 14 | 15 | 16 | 17 | 18 | 19 | 20 | 21 | 22 | 23 | 24 | 25 | 26 | 27 | 28 | 29 | 30 | 31 | 32 | 33 | 34 | 35 | 36 | NCSC | Pts | Ref |
|---|---|---|---|---|---|---|---|---|---|---|---|---|---|---|---|---|---|---|---|---|---|---|---|---|---|---|---|---|---|---|---|---|---|---|---|---|---|---|---|---|---|---|
| 2004 | Dale Earnhardt, Inc. | 8 | Chevy | DAY | CAR | LVS | ATL | DAR | BRI | TEX | MAR | TAL | CAL | RCH | CLT | DOV | POC | MCH | SON | DAY | CHI | NHA; RL^{†} | POC | IND | GLN | MCH | BRI | CAL | RCH | | | | | | | | | | | 70th | 119 | |
| 2004 | Dale Earnhardt, Inc. | 1 | Chevy | | | | | | | | | | | | | | | | | | | | | | | | | | | NHA; DNQ | DOV | TAL | KAN | CLT | MAR | ATL; 37 | PHO | DAR | HOM; 32 | 70th | 119 | |
| 2005 | Dale Earnhardt, Inc. | 1 | Chevy | DAY; 34 | CAL | LVS | ATL | BRI | MAR | TEX | PHO | TAL; 21 | DAR | RCH | CLT; 7 | DOV | POC | MCH | SON | DAY | CHI | NHA | POC | IND; 42 | GLN | MCH | BRI | CAL | RCH | NHA | DOV | TAL; 28 | KAN | CLT | MAR | ATL; 40 | TEX; 15 | PHO | HOM | 47th | 589 | |
| 2006 | Dale Earnhardt, Inc. | 1 | Chevy | DAY; 16 | CAL; 15 | LVS; 20 | ATL; 19 | BRI; 38 | MAR; 19 | TEX; 8 | PHO; 22 | TAL; 36 | RCH; 41 | DAR; 14 | CLT; 21 | DOV; 22 | POC; 24 | MCH; 15 | SON; 16 | DAY; 29 | CHI; 19 | NHA; 18 | POC; 10 | IND; 19 | GLN; 28 | MCH; 30 | BRI; 18 | CAL; 18 | RCH; 40 | NHA; 22 | DOV; 6 | KAN; 11 | TAL; 5 | CLT; 31 | MAR; 36 | ATL; 37 | TEX; 14 | PHO; 12 | HOM; 2 | 19th | 3673 | |
| 2007 | Dale Earnhardt, Inc. | 1 | Chevy | DAY; 29 | CAL; 42 | LVS; 12 | ATL; 8 | BRI; 37 | MAR; 29 | TEX; 7 | PHO; 20 | TAL; 10 | RCH; 28 | DAR; 11 | CLT; 16 | DOV; 1* | POC; 3 | MCH; 2 | SON; 24 | NHA; 3 | DAY; 13 | CHI; 39 | IND; 12 | POC; 22 | GLN; 6 | MCH; 2 | BRI; 11 | CAL; 6 | RCH; 15 | NHA; 5 | DOV; 13 | KAN; 38 | TAL; 42 | CLT; 17 | MAR; 19 | ATL; 31* | **TEX**; 3 | PHO; 7 | HOM; 6 | 11th | 6164 | |
| 2008 | Dale Earnhardt, Inc. | 1 | Chevy | DAY; 20 | CAL; 6 | LVS; 15 | ATL; 21 | BRI; 13 | MAR; 21 | TEX; 36 | PHO; 8 | TAL; 37 | RCH; 5 | DAR; 14 | CLT; 34 | DOV; 6 | POC; 17 | MCH; 17 | SON; 16 | NHA; 4 | DAY; 17 | CHI; 9 | IND; 24 | POC; 15 | GLN; 5 | MCH; 16 | BRI; 35 | CAL; 19 | RCH; 16 | NHA; 7 | DOV; 20 | KAN; 43 | TAL; 41 | CLT; 14 | MAR; 10 | ATL; 15 | TEX; 8 | PHO; 43 | HOM; 10 | 15th | 3839 | |
| 2009 | Earnhardt Ganassi Racing | 1 | Chevy | **DAY**; 11 | CAL; 27 | LVS; 32 | ATL; 10 | BRI; 26 | MAR; 29 | TEX; 25 | PHO; 7 | TAL; 33 | RCH; 22 | DAR; 6 | CLT; 23 | DOV; 21 | POC; 18 | MCH; 26 | SON; 25 | NHA; 37 | DAY; 25 | CHI; 16 | IND; 17 | POC; 19 | GLN; 28 | MCH; 21 | BRI; 22 | **ATL**; 26* | RCH; 39 | NHA; 19 | DOV; 33 | KAN; 16 | CAL; 22 | CLT; 9 | MAR; 28 | TAL; 31 | TEX; 14 | **PHO**; 5 | HOM; 9 | 23rd | 3503 | |
| 2010 | Michael Waltrip Racing | 56 | Toyota | DAY; 6 | CAL; 39 | LVS; 20 | ATL; 27 | BRI; 12 | MAR; 5 | PHO; 17 | TEX; 9 | TAL; 12 | RCH; 7 | DAR; 19 | **DOV**; 12 | CLT; 23 | POC; 25 | MCH; 17 | SON; 42 | NHA; 22 | DAY; 35 | CHI; 11 | IND; 26 | POC; 9 | GLN; 15 | MCH; 8 | BRI; 17 | ATL; 12 | RCH; 22 | NHA; 20 | DOV; 34 | KAN; 20 | CAL; 18 | CLT; 15 | MAR; 29 | TAL; 6 | TEX; 38 | PHO; 15 | HOM; 11 | 22nd | 3916 | |
| 2011 | Michael Waltrip Racing | 56 | Toyota | DAY; 19 | PHO; 14 | LVS; 6 | BRI; 17 | CAL; 21 | MAR; 40 | TEX; 35 | TAL; 13 | RCH; 27 | DAR; 10 | DOV; 8 | CLT; 26 | KAN; 20 | POC; 10 | MCH; 26 | SON; 8 | DAY; 35 | KEN; 18 | NHA; 8 | IND; 24 | POC; 12 | GLN; 4 | MCH; 19 | BRI; 2 | ATL; 14 | RCH; 30 | CHI; 18 | NHA; 16 | **DOV**; 30 | KAN; 36 | CLT; 23 | TAL; 10 | MAR; 8 | TEX; 8 | PHO; 20 | HOM; 3 | 18th | 937 | |
| 2012 | Michael Waltrip Racing | 56 | Toyota | DAY; 12 | PHO; 7 | LVS; 17 | BRI; 3 | CAL; 8 | MAR; 5 | **TEX**; 6 | KAN; 2* | RCH; 25 | TAL; 28 | DAR; 5 | CLT; 12 | DOV; 7 | POC; 20 | MCH; 12 | SON; 22 | KEN; 8 | DAY; 17 | NHA; 11 | IND; 8 | POC; 3 | GLN; 10 | MCH; 10 | BRI; 11 | ATL; 4 | RCH; 21 | CHI; 9 | NHA; 17 | DOV; 6 | TAL; 13 | CLT; 10 | KAN; 2 | MAR; 23 | TEX; 13 | PHO; 42 | HOM; 6 | 11th | 2299 | |
| 2013 | Michael Waltrip Racing | 56 | Toyota | DAY; 24 | PHO; 36 | LVS; 8 | BRI; 12 | CAL; 18 | MAR; 40 | TEX; 2 | KAN; 4 | RCH; 17 | TAL; 7 | DAR; 12 | CLT; 9 | DOV; 38 | POC; 23 | MCH; 3 | SON; 1* | KEN; 7 | DAY; 41 | NHA; 16 | IND; 11 | POC; 15 | GLN; 3 | MCH; 16 | BRI; 35 | ATL; 3 | RCH; 7 | CHI; 18 | NHA; 10 | DOV; 15 | KAN; 19 | CLT; 22 | TAL; 8 | MAR; 16 | TEX; 14 | PHO; 8 | HOM; 4 | 16th | 998 | |
| 2014 | Furniture Row Racing | 78 | Chevy | DAY; 43 | PHO; 22 | LVS; 14 | BRI; 36 | CAL; 23 | MAR; 21 | TEX; 18 | DAR; 27 | RCH; 10 | TAL; 17 | KAN; 21 | CLT; 25 | DOV; 6 | POC; 9 | MCH; 37 | SON; 15 | KEN; 19 | DAY; 15 | NHA; 12 | IND; 25 | POC; 32 | GLN; 13 | MCH; 36 | BRI; 20 | ATL; 23 | RCH; 25 | CHI; 14 | NHA; 12 | DOV; 7 | KAN; 4 | CLT; 14 | TAL; 27 | MAR; 38 | TEX; 19 | PHO; 12 | HOM; 17 | 24th | 857 | |
| 2015 | Furniture Row Racing | 78 | Chevy | DAY; 8 | ATL; 6 | LVS; 2 | PHO; 7 | CAL; 8 | MAR; 6 | TEX; 9 | BRI; 29 | RCH; 10 | TAL; 5 | KAN; 9* | CLT; 5* | DOV; 6* | POC; 1* | MCH; 3 | SON; 42 | DAY; 38 | KEN; 17 | NHA; 12 | IND; 4 | POC; 19 | GLN; 25 | MCH; 3 | BRI; 28 | DAR; 9 | RCH; 32 | CHI; 13 | NHA; 8 | DOV; 11 | CLT; 3 | KAN; 15 | TAL; 7 | MAR; 6 | TEX; 8 | PHO; 14 | HOM; 12 | 4th | 5032 | |
| 2016 | Furniture Row Racing | 78 | Toyota | DAY; 2 | ATL; 7 | LVS; 11 | PHO; 14 | CAL; 32 | MAR; 18 | TEX; 6* | BRI; 14 | RCH; 9 | TAL; 13 | **KAN**; 14* | DOV; 9 | **CLT**; 1* | POC; 19 | MCH; 12 | SON; 5 | DAY; 29 | KEN; 10 | NHA; 16 | IND; 8 | **POC**; 38 | GLN; 7 | BRI; 23 | MCH; 20 | DAR; 1 | RCH; 3* | CHI; 1 | NHA; 7* | DOV; 1* | CLT; 13 | KAN; 11 | **TAL**; 40 | **MAR**; 7 | TEX; 3 | PHO; 40 | HOM; 36 | 11th | 2271 | |
| 2017 | Furniture Row Racing | 78 | Toyota | DAY; 13 | ATL; 8 | LVS; 1* | PHO; 11 | CAL; 4 | MAR; 16 | TEX; 8 | BRI; 8 | RCH; 10 | TAL; 35 | KAN; 1* | CLT; 3* | DOV; 3 | POC; 6 | MCH; 6 | SON; 37* | DAY; 34 | KEN; 1* | **NHA**; 3* | IND; 33 | POC; 3 | GLN; 1* | MCH; 2 | BRI; 21 | DAR; 8 | RCH; 20* | CHI; 1 | NHA; 5 | **DOV**; 4 | CLT; 1 | TAL; 23 | **KAN**; 1 | MAR; 2 | TEX; 2* | PHO; 3 | HOM; 1 | 1st | 5040 | |
| 2018 | Furniture Row Racing | 78 | Toyota | DAY; 18 | ATL; 5 | LVS; 4 | **PHO**; 5 | **CAL**; 1* | MAR; 4 | TEX; 37 | BRI; 30 | **RCH**; 14* | TAL; 26 | DOV; 4 | KAN; 2 | CLT; 2 | POC; 1 | MCH; 18 | SON; 1* | CHI; 4 | DAY; 2 | **KEN**; 1* | NHA; 4 | POC; 15 | GLN; 2 | MCH; 14 | BRI; 30 | DAR; 11 | IND; 40 | LVS; 3* | RCH; 3* | ROV; 14 | DOV; 15 | TAL; 23 | KAN; 5 | MAR; 3 | TEX; 9 | PHO; 14 | HOM; 2 | 2nd | 5035 | |
| 2019 | Joe Gibbs Racing | 19 | Toyota | DAY; 35 | ATL; 2 | LVS; 8 | PHO; 2 | CAL; 8 | MAR; 8 | TEX; 12 | BRI; 17 | RCH; 1* | TAL; 20 | DOV; 1 | KAN; 19 | CLT; 1* | POC; 35 | MCH; 3 | SON; 1* | CHI; 9 | DAY; 22 | KEN; 19 | NHA; 6 | POC; 3 | GLN; 2 | MCH; 4 | BRI; 13 | DAR; 15 | IND; 27 | LVS; 1 | RCH; 1 | ROV; 7 | DOV; 2 | TAL; 26 | KAN; 6 | MAR; 1* | TEX; 6 | PHO; 6 | HOM; 2 | 2nd | 5035 | |
| 2020 | Joe Gibbs Racing | 19 | Toyota | DAY; 32 | LVS; 20 | CAL; 14 | PHO; 32 | DAR; 6 | DAR; 10 | CLT; 6 | CLT; 9 | BRI; 20 | ATL; 3 | MAR; 1 | HOM; 12 | TAL; 24 | POC; 6 | POC; 10 | IND; 38 | KEN; 2 | TEX; 29 | KAN; 3 | NHA; 3 | MCH; 3 | MCH; 3 | DRC; 3 | DOV; 2 | DOV; 2 | DAY; 4 | DAR; 22* | RCH; 2 | BRI; 24 | LVS; 4 | TAL; 23 | ROV; 7 | KAN; 9 | TEX; 2 | MAR; 22 | PHO; 10 | 7th | 2341 | |
| 2021 | Joe Gibbs Racing | 19 | Toyota | DAY; 25 | DRC; 12 | HOM; 3 | LVS; 6 | PHO; 1 | ATL; 9 | BRD; 19* | MAR; 1 | RCH; 5 | TAL; 31 | KAN; 6 | DAR; 1* | DOV; 19 | COA; 35 | CLT; 29 | SON; 3 | NSH; 22 | POC; 18 | POC; 11 | ROA; 9 | ATL; 3 | NHA; 12 | GLN; 3* | IRC; 15 | MCH; 10 | DAY; 29 | DAR; 4 | RCH; 1 | BRI; 7 | LVS; 4 | TAL; 12 | ROV; 29 | TEX; 25 | KAN; 7 | MAR; 4 | PHO; 2 | 2nd | 5035 | |
| 2022 | Joe Gibbs Racing | 19 | Toyota | DAY; 13 | CAL; 13 | LVS; 8 | PHO; 35 | ATL; 8 | COA; 7 | RCH; 4 | MAR; 22 | BRD; 21 | TAL; 5 | DOV; 12 | DAR; 24 | KAN; 6 | CLT; 12 | GTW; 6 | SON; 26 | NSH; 22 | ROA; 13 | ATL; 11 | **NHA**; 4* | POC; 7 | IRC; 21 | MCH; 6 | RCH; 7 | GLN; 23 | DAY; 8 | DAR; 31 | KAN; 5 | BRI; 36 | TEX; 31 | TAL; 26 | ROV; 17 | LVS; 7 | HOM; 6 | MAR; 20 | PHO; 15 | 17th | 1037 | |
| 2023 | Joe Gibbs Racing | 19 | Toyota | DAY; 15 | CAL; 11 | LVS; 7 | PHO; 17 | ATL; 19 | COA; 17 | RCH; 11 | BRD; 7 | MAR; 3 | TAL; 27 | DOV; 1 | KAN; 8 | **DAR**; 31* | CLT; 3 | GTW; 5 | SON; 1* | NSH; 2 | CSC; 32 | ATL; 29 | NHA; 1* | POC; 3 | RCH; 7 | MCH; 2 | IRC; 7 | GLN; 6 | DAY; 24 | DAR; 18 | KAN; 36 | BRI; 19 | TEX; 17 | TAL; 18 | ROV; 20 | LVS; 9 | **HOM**; 29 | **MAR**; 12 | PHO; 6 | 11th | 2269 | |
| 2024 | Joe Gibbs Racing | 19 | Toyota | DAY; 15 | ATL; 12 | LVS; 7 | PHO; 7 | BRI; 2 | COA; 10 | RCH; 4* | MAR; 18 | TEX; 14 | TAL; 11 | DOV; 3 | KAN; 4 | DAR; 25 | CLT; 12 | GTW; 34 | SON; 27 | IOW; 15 | NHA; 9 | NSH; 24 | CSC; 33 | POC; 8 | IND; 27 | RCH; 37 | MCH; 24 | DAY; 24 | DAR; 36 | ATL; 35 | GLN; 20 | BRI; 24 | KAN; 3 | TAL; 11 | ROV; 21 | LVS; 6 | HOM; 23 | **MAR**; 24 | **PHO**; 17 | 10th | 2257 | |
| 2025 | Tricon Garage | 56 | Toyota | DAY; 38 | ATL | COA | PHO | LVS | HOM | MAR | DAR | BRI | TAL | TEX | KAN | CLT | NSH | MCH | MXC | POC | ATL | CSC | SON | DOV | IND | IOW | GLN | RCH | DAY | DAR | GTW | BRI | NHA | KAN | ROV | LVS | TAL | MAR | PHO | 42nd | 1 | |
^{†} – Relieved Dale Earnhardt Jr. during race

===== Daytona 500 =====
| Year | Team | Manufacturer | Start | Finish |
|---|---|---|---|---|
| 2005 | Dale Earnhardt, Inc. | Chevrolet | 10 | 34 |
| 2006 | Dale Earnhardt, Inc. | Chevrolet | 19 | 16 |
| 2007 | Dale Earnhardt, Inc. | Chevrolet | 13 | 29 |
| 2008 | Dale Earnhardt, Inc. | Chevrolet | 25 | 20 |
| 2009 | Earnhardt Ganassi Racing | Chevrolet | **1** | 11 |
| 2010 | Michael Waltrip Racing | Toyota | 14 | 6 |
| 2011 | Michael Waltrip Racing | Toyota | 20 | 19 |
| 2012 | Michael Waltrip Racing | Toyota | 26 | 12 |
| 2013 | Michael Waltrip Racing | Toyota | 37 | 24 |
| 2014 | Furniture Row Racing | Chevrolet | 2 | 43 |
| 2015 | Furniture Row Racing | Chevrolet | 10 | 8 |
| 2016 | Furniture Row Racing | Toyota | 28 | 2 |
| 2017 | Furniture Row Racing | Toyota | 35 | 13 |
| 2018 | Furniture Row Racing | Toyota | 24 | 18 |
| 2019 | Joe Gibbs Racing | Toyota | 11 | 35 |
| 2020 | Joe Gibbs Racing | Toyota | 15 | 32 |
| 2021 | Joe Gibbs Racing | Toyota | 26 | 25 |
| 2022 | Joe Gibbs Racing | Toyota | 14 | 13 |
| 2023 | Joe Gibbs Racing | Toyota | 16 | 15 |
| 2024 | Joe Gibbs Racing | Toyota | 27 | 15 |
| 2025 | Tricon Garage | Toyota | 39 | 38 |

==== Xfinity Series ====
NASCAR Xfinity Series results
| Year | Team | No. | Make | 1 | 2 | 3 | 4 | 5 | 6 | 7 | 8 | 9 | 10 | 11 | 12 | 13 | 14 | 15 | 16 | 17 | 18 | 19 | 20 | 21 | 22 | 23 | 24 | 25 | 26 | 27 | 28 | 29 | 30 | 31 | 32 | 33 | 34 | 35 | NXSC | Pts | Ref |
|---|---|---|---|---|---|---|---|---|---|---|---|---|---|---|---|---|---|---|---|---|---|---|---|---|---|---|---|---|---|---|---|---|---|---|---|---|---|---|---|---|---|
| 2001 | Truex Motorsports | 56 | Chevy | DAY | CAR | LVS | ATL | DAR | BRI | TEX | NSH | TAL | CAL | RCH | NHA | NZH | CLT | DOV | KEN | MLW | GLN | CHI | GTW | PPR | IRP | MCH | BRI | DAR | RCH | DOV; 38 | KAN | CLT | MEM | PHO | CAR | HOM; DNQ | | | 133rd | 49 | |
| 2002 | Phoenix Racing | 1 | Chevy | DAY | CAR | LVS | DAR | BRI | TEX | NSH | TAL | CAL | RCH | NHA; 29 | NZH | CLT | | | | | | | | | | | | | | | | | | | | | | | 65th | 370 | |
| 2002 | Truex Motorsports | 56 | Chevy | | | | | | | | | | | | | | DOV; 17 | NSH | KEN | MLW | DAY | CHI | GTW | PPR | IRP | MCH | BRI | DAR | | | | | | | | | HOM; 23 | | 65th | 370 | |
| 2002 | Truex Motorsports | 58 | Chevy | | | | | | | | | | | | | | | | | | | | | | | | | | RCH; DNQ | DOV; 25 | KAN | CLT | MEM | ATL | CAR | PHO | | | 65th | 370 | |
| 2003 | Truex Motorsports | 58 | Chevy | DAY | CAR | LVS | DAR | BRI | TEX | TAL | NSH; 15 | CAL | | | | | | | KEN; 21 | MLW | DAY | CHI | NHA | PPR | IRP; 21 | MCH | | | | | | | | | | | | | 40th | 1228 | |
| 2003 | Chance 2 Motorsports | 81 | Chevy | | | | | | | | | | RCH; 31 | GTW | NZH | CLT | DOV; 18 | NSH | | | | | | | | | BRI; 6 | DAR | RCH | DOV; DNQ | KAN | | | | | | | | 40th | 1228 | |
| 2003 | Stanton Barrett Motorsports | 91 | Chevy | | | | | | | | | | | | | | | | | | | | | | | | | | | DOV; 13 | | | | | | | | | 40th | 1228 | |
| 2003 | Chance 2 Motorsports | 8 | Chevy | | | | | | | | | | | | | | | | | | | | | | | | | | | | | CLT; 17 | MEM | ATL | PHO | CAR; 2 | HOM; 2 | | 40th | 1228 | |
| 2004 | Chance 2 Motorsports | 81 | Chevy | **DAY**; 28 | | | | | | | | | | | | | | | | | | | | | | | | | | | | | | | | | | | 1st | 5173 | |
| 2004 | Chance 2 Motorsports | 8 | Chevy | | CAR; 2 | LVS; 14 | DAR; 4 | BRI; 1 | TEX; 10 | **NSH**; 23 | TAL; 1 | CAL; 13 | **GTW**; 1 | RCH; 7 | NZH; 1 | CLT; 14 | DOV; 2 | **NSH**; 2 | **KEN**; 6 | MLW; 9 | DAY; 3 | CHI; 14 | NHA; 11 | **PPR**; 5 | IRP; 4 | **MCH**; 3 | BRI; 7 | CAL; 6 | RCH; 3 | DOV; 1 | KAN; 30 | CLT; 6 | **MEM**; 1 | ATL; 9 | PHO; 3 | **DAR**; 4 | HOM; 9 | | 1st | 5173 | |
| 2005 | Chance 2 Motorsports | 8 | Chevy | DAY; 4 | CAL; 30 | MXC; 1 | LVS; 16 | ATL; 11 | NSH; 14 | BRI; 31 | TEX; 35 | PHO; 9 | TAL; 1 | DAR; 3 | RCH; 38 | CLT; 7 | DOV; 1 | NSH; 5 | KEN; 2 | MLW; 2 | DAY; 1 | CHI; 7 | NHA; 1 | PPR; 4 | **GTW**; 26 | IRP; 1 | GLN; 5 | **MCH**; 4 | BRI; 6 | CAL; 15 | RCH; 27 | DOV; 12 | **KAN**; 9 | CLT; 11 | **MEM**; 3 | TEX; 11 | PHO; 6 | HOM; 7 | 1st | 4937 | |
| 2006 | Dale Earnhardt, Inc. | 8 | Chevy | DAY | CAL | MXC | LVS | ATL | BRI | TEX | NSH | PHO | TAL; 1 | RCH | DAR | CLT; 5 | DOV | NSH | KEN | MLW | | | | | | | | | | | | DOV; 30 | KAN | CLT | MEM | TEX | PHO | HOM | 50th | 835 | |
| 2006 | JR Motorsports | 88 | Chevy | | | | | | | | | | | | | | | | | | DAY; 8 | CHI; 16 | NHA | MAR | GTW | IRP | GLN; 6 | MCH | BRI | CAL | RCH | | | | | | | | 50th | 835 | |
| 2007 | Dale Earnhardt, Inc. | 11 | Chevy | DAY; 6 | CAL | MXC | LVS | ATL | BRI | NSH | TEX | PHO | TAL; 41 | RCH | DAR | CLT | DOV | NSH | KEN | MLW | NHA | DAY | CHI | GTW | IRP | CGV | GLN | MCH | BRI | CAL | RCH | | | | | | | | 84th | 370 | |
| 2007 | Dale Earnhardt, Inc. | 8 | Chevy | | | | | | | | | | | | | | | | | | | | | | | | | | | | | DOV; 2 | KAN | CLT | MEM | TEX | PHO | HOM | 84th | 370 | |
| 2008 | Dale Earnhardt, Inc. | 8 | Chevy | DAY; 11 | CAL | LVS | ATL | | | | | | | | | | | | | | | | | | | | | | | | | | | | | | | | 100th | 175 | |
| 2008 | JR Motorsports | 5 | Chevy | | | | | BRI; 41 | NSH | TEX | PHO | MXC | TAL | RCH | DAR | CLT | DOV | NSH | KEN | MLW | NHA | DAY | CHI | GTW | IRP | CGV | GLN | MCH | BRI | CAL | RCH | DOV | KAN | CLT | MEM | TEX | PHO | HOM | 100th | 175 | |
| 2009 | Phoenix Racing | 1 | Chevy | DAY | CAL | LVS | BRI | TEX | NSH | PHO | TAL | RCH | DAR | CLT | DOV | NSH | KEN | MLW | NHA | DAY | CHI | GTW | IRP | IOW | GLN | MCH | BRI | CGV | ATL | RCH; 6 | DOV; 16 | KAN | CAL | CLT | MEM | TEX | PHO | HOM | 88th | 265 | |
| 2010 | Diamond-Waltrip Racing | 00 | Toyota | DAY | CAL | LVS | BRI | NSH | PHO | TEX | TAL | RCH | DAR | DOV | CLT | NSH | KEN | ROA | NHA | DAY | CHI | GTW | IRP | IOW | GLN | MCH | BRI | CGV | ATL | RCH | DOV | KAN; 5 | | CLT; 2 | GTW | | PHO; 34 | | 51st | 771 | |
| 2010 | Diamond-Waltrip Racing | 99 | Toyota | | | | | | | | | | | | | | | | | | | | | | | | | | | | | | CAL; 25 | | | TEX; 5 | | HOM; 12 | 51st | 771 | |
| 2021 | Joe Gibbs Racing | 54 | Toyota | DAY | DRC | HOM | LVS | PHO | ATL; 2* | MAR | TAL | DAR | DOV | COA | CLT | MOH | TEX | NSH | POC | ROA | ATL | NHA | GLN | IRC | MCH | DAY | DAR | RCH | BRI | LVS | TAL | ROV | TEX | KAN | MAR | PHO | | | 76th | 0^{1} | |

==== Camping World Truck Series ====
NASCAR Camping World Truck Series results
| Year | Team | No. | Make | 1 | 2 | 3 | 4 | 5 | 6 | 7 | 8 | 9 | 10 | 11 | 12 | 13 | 14 | 15 | 16 | 17 | 18 | 19 | 20 | 21 | 22 | 23 | 24 | 25 | NCWTC | Pts | Ref |
|---|---|---|---|---|---|---|---|---|---|---|---|---|---|---|---|---|---|---|---|---|---|---|---|---|---|---|---|---|---|---|---|
| 2005 | Billy Ballew Motorsports | 15 | Chevy | DAY | CAL | ATL | MAR | GTW | MFD | CLT | DOV | TEX | MCH | MLW; 15 | KAN | KEN | MEM | IRP | NSH | BRI | RCH | NHA | LVS | MAR | ATL | TEX | PHO | HOM | 77th | 106 | |
| 2006 | Billy Ballew Motorsports | 51 | Chevy | DAY | CAL | ATL | MAR | GTW | CLT | MFD | DOV | TEX | MCH; 34 | MLW | KAN | KEN | MEM | IRP | NSH | BRI | NHA | LVS | TAL | MAR | ATL | TEX | PHO | HOM | 85th | 61 | |
| 2021 | Kyle Busch Motorsports | 51 | Toyota | DAY | DRC | LVS | ATL | BRD; 1* | RCH | KAN | DAR | COA | CLT | TEX | NSH | POC | KNX | GLN | GTW | DAR | BRI | LVS | TAL | MAR | PHO | | | | 95th | 0^{1} | |

^{*} Season still in progress
^{1} Ineligible for series points

==== Busch North Series ====
NASCAR Busch North Series results
| Year | Team | No. | Make | 1 | 2 | 3 | 4 | 5 | 6 | 7 | 8 | 9 | 10 | 11 | 12 | 13 | 14 | 15 | 16 | 17 | 18 | 19 | 20 | NBNSC | Pts | Ref |
|---|---|---|---|---|---|---|---|---|---|---|---|---|---|---|---|---|---|---|---|---|---|---|---|---|---|---|
| 1999 | Truex Motorsports | 56 | Chevy | LEE | RPS | NHA | TMP | NZH | HOL | BEE | JEN | GLN | STA | NHA | NZH | STA; DNQ | NHA | GLN | EPP | TRO | BEE | NHA | LIM | N/A | – | |
| 2000 | Truex Motorsports | 56 | Chevy | LEE; 16 | NHA; 29 | SEE; 3 | HOL; 24 | BEE; 29 | JEN; 23 | GLN | STA; 11 | **NHA**; 1** | NZH | STA; 24 | WFD; 29 | GLN; 19 | EPP; 8 | **TMP**; 13 | TRO; 4 | BEE; 20 | **NHA**; 9 | LIM; 23 | | 12th | 1961 | |
| 2001 | Truex Motorsports | 56 | Chevy | LEE; 4 | NHA; 2 | SEE; 19 | HOL; 6 | BEE; 28 | EPP; 17 | STA; 25 | WFD; 24 | BEE; 4* | TMP; 1* | NHA; 2 | STA; 1* | SEE; 26 | GLN; 5 | NZH; 7 | TRO; 19 | BEE; 3 | DOV; 19 | STA; 4 | LIM; 34 | 8th | 2630 | |
| 2002 | Truex Motorsports | 56 | Chevy | LEE; 11 | NHA; 31 | NZH; 5 | SEE; 3 | BEE; 29 | STA; 10 | HOL; 20 | WFD; 4 | **TMP**; 9* | NHA; 4 | STA; 6* | GLN; 32 | ADI; 25 | TRO; 6 | BEE; 3 | NHA; 28 | DOV; 3 | STA; 12* | LIM; 10 | | 11th | 2416 | |
| 2003 | Truex Motorsports | 56 | Chevy | LEE | **STA**; 1** | LER | BEE | **STA**; 2 | HOL | TMP; 3 | **NHA**; 1* | WFD | SEE | GLN | **ADI**; 2* | BEE | TRO | NHA; 15 | STA | LIM | | | | 25th | 1013 | |

==== Featherlite Modified Tour ====
NASCAR Featherlite Modified Tour results
| Year | Car owner | No. | Make | 1 | 2 | 3 | 4 | 5 | 6 | 7 | 8 | 9 | 10 | 11 | 12 | 13 | 14 | 15 | 16 | 17 | 18 | 19 | 20 | NFMTC | Pts | Ref |
|---|---|---|---|---|---|---|---|---|---|---|---|---|---|---|---|---|---|---|---|---|---|---|---|---|---|---|
| 2001 | Info not available | | | SBO | TMP | STA | WFD | NZH | STA | RIV | SEE | RCH | NHA; DNQ | HOL | RIV | CHE | TMP | STA | WFD | TMP | STA | MAR | TMP | N/A | – | |
| 2002 | Info not available | 98 | Chevy | TMP | STA | WFD | NZH | RIV | SEE | RCH | STA | BEE | NHA | RIV | TMP | STA | WFD | TMP | NHA; 40 | STA | MAR | TMP | | 90th | 43 | |

=== International Race of Champions ===
(key) (Bold – Pole position. * – Most laps led.)

International Race of Champions results
| Year | Make | 1 | 2 | 3 | 4 | Pos. | Pts | Ref |
|---|---|---|---|---|---|---|---|---|
| 2005 | Pontiac | DAY; 2 | TEX; 4 | RCH; 5 | ATL; 1* | 2nd | 68 | |
| 2006 | Pontiac | DAY; 5 | TEX; 3 | DAY; 6 | ATL; 1 | 3rd | 57 | |

Sporting positions
| Preceded by Brian Vickers | NASCAR Busch Series champion 2004, 2005 | Succeeded by Kevin Harvick |
| Preceded by Jimmie Johnson | NASCAR Cup Series champion 2017 | Succeeded by Joey Logano |
Achievements
| Preceded by Carl Edwards; Kyle Busch | Coca-Cola 600 winner 2016; 2019 | Succeeded by Austin Dillon; Brad Keselowski |
| Preceded by Carl Edwards | Southern 500 winner 2016 | Succeeded by Denny Hamlin |
Awards
| Preceded by Lewis Hamilton | Best Driver ESPY Award; 2018 | Succeeded by Kyle Busch |
