= Mayetta, New Jersey =

Populated place in Ocean County, New Jersey, US

- Unincorporated community
- Mayetta's location in Ocean County (Inset: Ocean County in New Jersey) Mayetta (New Jersey) Mayetta (the United States)
- Coordinates: 39°40′40″N 74°16′23″W
- Country: United States
- State: New Jersey
- County: Ocean
- Township: Stafford
- Elevation: 26 ft (8 m)
- Time zone: UTC−05:00 (Eastern (EST))
  - Summer (DST): UTC−04:00 (EDT)
- Area code: 609
- GNIS feature ID: 878205

Mayetta is an unincorporated community located within Stafford Township, in Ocean County, in the U.S. state of New Jersey. U.S. Route 9 is a major highway that travels through Mayetta.

== Notable people ==
- Martin Truex Sr. (born 1958), former driver who competed in the Busch North Series.
- Martin Truex Jr. (born 1980), a retired NASCAR Cup Series driver who used to drive Joe Gibbs Racing's #19 Toyota Camry and is the 2017 Monster Energy NASCAR Cup Series champion.
- Ryan Truex (born 1992), a NASCAR Xfinity Series driver who currently pilots Joe Gibbs Racing's #19 Toyota Supra part-time, having previously driven in the Truck Series and the Cup Series.
