= 2007 Dodge Dealers 400 =

28th race of 2007 NASCAR Nextel Cup series

Race details
- Race 28 of 36 in the 2007 NASCAR Nextel Cup Series
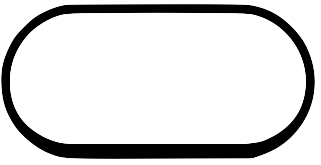
- Date: September 23, 2007
- Official name: Dodge Dealers 400
- Location: Dover International Speedway, Dover, Delaware
- Course: Permanent racing facility
- Course length: 1.0 miles (1.609 km)
- Distance: 400 laps, 400 mi (643.737 km)
- Weather: Temperatures up to 81.5 °F (27.5 °C); wind speeds up to 11.1 miles per hour (17.9 km/h)
- Average speed: 101.846 miles per hour (163.905 km/h)

Pole position
Driver	Jimmie Johnson	Hendrick Motorsports
- Time: 23.261

Most laps led
Driver	Matt Kenseth	Roush Fenway Racing
- Laps: 192

Winner
No. 99	Carl Edwards	Roush Fenway Racing

Television in the United States
- Network: ABC
- Announcers: Jerry Punch, Rusty Wallace, Andy Petree
- Nielsen ratings: 3.5 (Final); (5,498,209 million)

Radio in the United States
- Radio: Motor Racing Network
- Booth announcers: Joe Moore, Barney Hall
- Turn announcers: Mike Bagley, Dan Hubbard, Dave Moody, Jeff Striegle

The 2007 Dodge Dealers 400 was the twenty-eighth stock car race of the 2007 NASCAR Nextel Cup Series and the second in the ten-race season-ending Chase for the Nextel Cup. It was held on September 23, 2007, at Dover International Speedway in Dover, Delaware before a crowd of 137,000. Roush Fenway Racing driver Carl Edwards won the 400-lap race starting from fifteenth position. His teammate Greg Biffle finished second and Dale Earnhardt Jr. took third.

Heading into the race, Jimmie Johnson and his Hendrick Motorsports teammate Jeff Gordon were tied for the lead of the Drivers' Championship. Although Johnson won the pole position by posting the fastest lap in qualifying, he was passed by Denny Hamlin on the second lap. Hamlin led for the next 40 laps until Matt Kenseth passed him. Hamlin retook it on the 57th lap and Kurt Busch led from laps 85 to 98 after a pit stop cycle. Kenseth returned to the lead on lap 99, and kept the position for a race-high 169 laps. On lap 207, Edwards took the lead for the first time, and maintained it until Mark Martin overtook him 21 laps later. Edwards did not reclaim the first place until he moved past his teammate Kenseth in the final-third of the race and kept it until Kenseth led six laps before his engine failed. This enabled Edwards to return to the lead, which he held through two red flag periods to clear debris and fluids after two separate accidents to win the race. There were thirteen cautions and fourteen lead changes by nine drivers during the course of the race.

Edwards' victory was his third of the season, the seventh of his career, and the 100th for Roush Fenway Racing. However, Edwards was issued a 25-point penalty after the right-rear of his vehicle was found to be too low in post-race inspection, and it was upheld in a subsequent appeal to the National Stock Car Racing Commission. After the race Jeff Gordon became the new leader of the Drivers' Championship with Tony Stewart advancing to second and Johnson dropping to third. In the Manufacturers' Championship Chevrolet maintained a 57-point lead over Ford. Dodge and Toyota retained third and fourth with eight races left in the season.

== Background ==
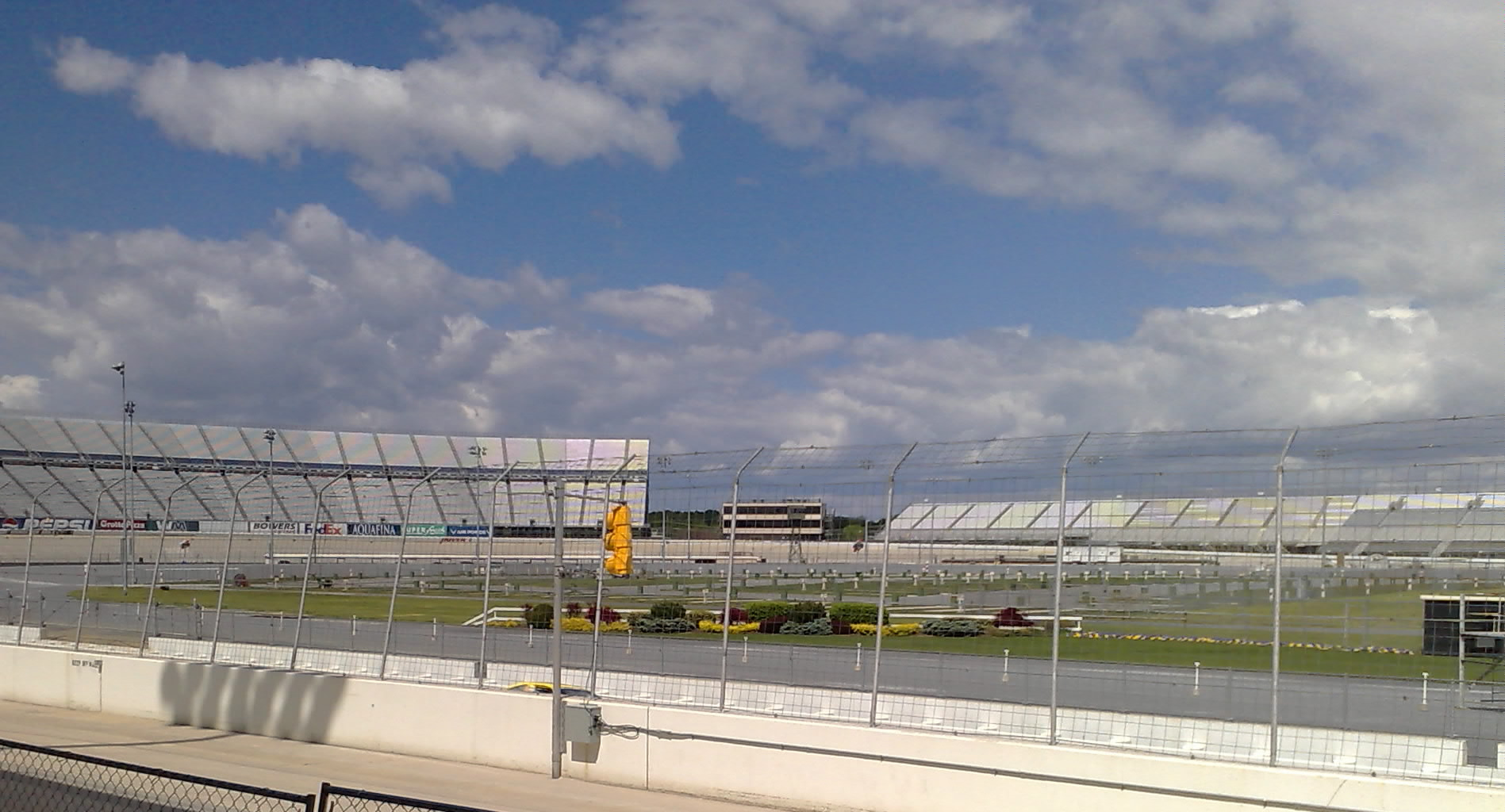
Dover International Speedway, where the race was held.

The Dodge Dealers 400 was the 28th of 36 scheduled stock car races of the 2007 NASCAR Nextel Cup Series and the second in the ten-race season-ending Chase for the Nextel Cup. It was held on September 23, 2007, at Dover International Speedway in Dover, Delaware, a short tracks that holds NASCAR races. NASCAR makes use of the track's standard configuration, a four-turn 1 mile (1.6 km) short track oval. Its turns are banked at twenty-four degrees; both the front stretch (the location of the finish line) and the backstretch are banked at nine degrees.

Before the race, Jimmie Johnson and teammate Jeff Gordon were tied for the lead in the Drivers' Championship on 5,210 points, with Tony Stewart in third. Clint Bowyer and Kyle Busch were fourth and fifth, and Martin Truex Jr., Matt Kenseth, Carl Edwards, Denny Hamlin, Kevin Harvick, Jeff Burton and Kurt Busch rounded out the top twelve drivers competing for the 2007 Chase for the Nextel Cup. Chevrolet led the Manufacturers' Championship with 215 points; Ford was second with 153 points. Dodge was third with 139 points, and Toyota a further 54 behind in fourth. Burton was the race's defending champion.

Former V8 Supercars champion and Busch Series driver Marcos Ambrose was scheduled to drive for Robby Gordon Motorsports after team owner Robby Gordon offered him the seat to make up for an incident between the two in the NAPA Auto Parts 200 Busch Series race at Circuit Gilles Villeneuve. However, Ambrose withdrew from the race as his wife Sonja was due to give birth to their second child intermittently. Three part-time season drivers attempted to qualify for the Dover International Speedway round: Sam Hornish Jr. for Penske Racing South, Scott Wimmer in the No. 33 Richard Childress Racing vehicle, and Kenny Wallace who filled in for the injured Ricky Rudd in the No. 88 Robert Yates Racing car.

== Practice and qualification ==
Three practice sessions were held before the Sunday race: one on Friday and two on Saturday. The first session lasted 90 minutes, the second 50 minutes and the third 60 minutes. In the first practice session, Johnson was fastest with a lap of 23.423 seconds. Hamlin was 0.071 seconds slower in second, and Tony Raines was third. Truex, Juan Pablo Montoya, Bobby Labonte, Dale Earnhardt Jr., David Ragan, Scott Riggs and Gordon occupied positions four to ten. On his first lap on the track, A. J. Allmendinger's engine failed, and his team changed engines.

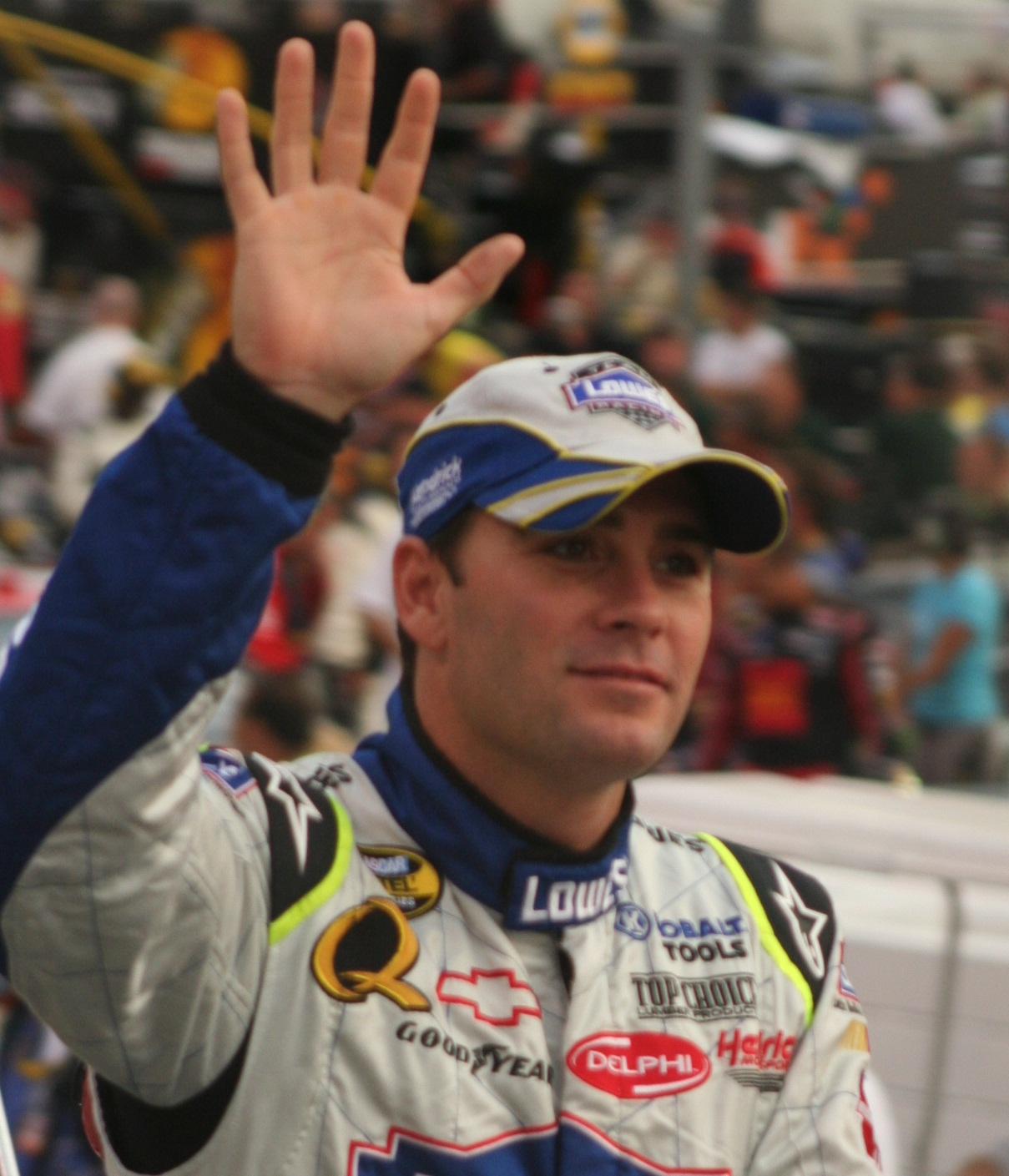
Jimmie Johnson took his second pole position of the season and his first at Dover International Raceway.

Forty-nine cars were entered for qualifying on Friday afternoon, according to NASCAR's qualifying procedure, forty-three were allowed to race. Each driver was limited to two timed laps, with the starting order determined by the competitor's fastest times. Johnson clinched his second pole position of the season, and his first at Dover International Raceway, with the fastest time of 23.261 seconds. He was joined on the grid's front row by Montoya, the highest-placed rookie, who was 0.141 seconds slower, and had the pole position until Johnson's lap. Hamlin qualified third, Kurt Busch took fourth after improving his car's handling, and the Autism Speaks 400 winner Truex took fifth. Riggs was the fastest driver required to qualify on time in sixth. Rounding out the top ten were Harvick, Labonte, and the Roush Fenway Racing's Greg Biffle and Kenseth. Edwards, another driver in the chase, set the 15th-fastest time, while the winner of the preceding Sylvania 300, Bowyer struggled on his lap en route to 42nd. The six drivers who failed to qualify were Ward Burton, Wimmer, Kevin Lepage, Dave Blaney, Jeremy Mayfield and Hornish. After the qualifier, Johnson said, "It was a great lap. I've had a great car all day today and it was a car that allowed me to balance myself and find more speed, the two things that I asked it to do. Track position is really important here but the thing we really focused on today was getting that first pit stall. So mission accomplished there, but this is just one day of many long ones to come."

On Saturday morning Hamiln became ill with flu-like symptoms, but he was still fastest in the second practice session with a time of 23.849 seconds. Second was Johnson and third position was taken by Stewart. Kurt Busch duplicated his qualifying result in fourth. Casey Mears set the fifth-quickest time, and Mark Martin was sixth. Positions seven through ten were occupied by Biffle, Gordon, Kenseth and Burton. Of the other drivers in the chase, Kyle Busch was thirteenth, and Edwards recorded the eighteenth-fastest lap. Later that day, Hamlin duplicated his second session result in the final practice session with a 23.946 seconds lap; Kenseth and his teammate Edwards set the second and third-fastest laps. Johnson, Bowyer, Gordon, Jamie McMurray, Martin, Truex and Earnhardt completed the top ten ahead of Sunday's race.

=== Qualifying results ===
Grid	Car	Driver	Team	Manufacturer	Time	Speed
1	48	Jimmie Johnson	Hendrick Motorsports	Chevrolet	23.261	154.766
2	42	Juan Pablo Montoya	Chip Ganassi Racing	Dodge	23.402	153.833
3	11	Denny Hamlin	Joe Gibbs Racing	Chevrolet	23.442	153.570
4	2	Kurt Busch	Penske Racing South	Dodge	23.450	153.518
5	1	Martin Truex Jr.	Dale Earnhardt Inc.	Chevrolet	23.497	153.211
6	10	Scott Riggs	Evernham Motorsports	Dodge	23.540	152.931
7	29	Kevin Harvick	Richard Childress Racing	Chevrolet	23.548	152.879
8	43	Bobby Labonte	Petty Enterprises	Dodge	23.616	152.439
9	16	Greg Biffle	Roush Fenway Racing	Ford	23.620	152.413
10	17	Matt Kenseth	Roush Fenway Racing	Ford	23.628	152.362
11	84	A. J. Allmendinger	Red Bull Racing Team	Toyota	23.628	152.362^{1}
12	19	Elliott Sadler	Evernham Motorsports	Dodge	23.640	152.284
13	00	David Reutimann	Michael Waltrip Racing	Toyota	23.674	152.066
14	9	Kasey Kahne	Evernham Motorsports	Dodge	23.683	152.008
15	99	Carl Edwards	Roush Fenway Racing	Ford	23.716	151.796
16	45	Kyle Petty	Petty Enterprises	Dodge	23.720	151.771
17	25	Casey Mears	Hendrick Motorsports	Chevrolet	23.729	151.713
18	78	Joe Nemechek	Furniture Row Racing	Chevrolet	23.732	151.694
19	44	Dale Jarrett	Michael Waltrip Racing	Toyota	23.736	151.668
20	96	Tony Raines	Hall of Fame Racing	Chevrolet	23.740	151.643
21	8	Dale Earnhardt Jr.	Dale Earnhardt Inc.	Chevrolet	23.760	151.515
22	5	Kyle Busch	Hendrick Motorsports	Chevrolet	23.766	151.477
23	83	Brian Vickers	Red Bull Racing Team	Toyota	23.768	151.464
24	12	Ryan Newman	Penske Racing South	Dodge	23.777	151.407
25	70	Johnny Sauter	Haas CNC Racing	Chevrolet	23.781	151.381
26	21	Ken Schrader	Wood Brothers Racing	Ford	23.810	151.197
27	24	Jeff Gordon	Hendrick Motorsports	Chevrolet	23.813	151.178
28	20	Tony Stewart	Joe Gibbs Racing	Chevrolet	23.814	151.172
29	49	John Andretti	BAM Racing	Dodge	23.833	151.051
30	26	Jamie McMurray	Roush Fenway Racing	Ford	23.839	151.013
31	01	Mark Martin	Dale Earnhardt Inc.	Chevrolet	23.855	150.912
32	18	J. J. Yeley	Joe Gibbs Racing	Chevrolet	23.860	150.880
33	41	Reed Sorenson	Chip Ganassi Racing	Dodge	23.860	150.880
34	66	Jeff Green	Haas CNC Racing	Chevrolet	23.872	150.804
35	6	David Ragan	Roush Fenway Racing	Ford	23.900	150.628
36	31	Jeff Burton	Richard Childress Racing	Chevrolet	23.933	150.420
37	38	David Gilliland	Robert Yates Racing	Ford	24.035	149.782
38	15	Paul Menard	Dale Earnhardt Inc.	Chevrolet	24.070	149.564
39	88	Kenny Wallace	Robert Yates Racing	Ford	24.150	149.068^{2}
40	40	David Stremme	Chip Ganassi Racing	Dodge	24.173	148.926^{2}
41	7	Robby Gordon	Robby Gordon Motorsports	Ford	24.296	148.173^{2}
42	07	Clint Bowyer	Richard Childress Racing	Chevrolet	24.318	148.038^{2}
43	55	Michael Waltrip	Michael Waltrip Racing	Toyota	23.945	150.344
Failed to qualify
44	4	Ward Burton	Morgan–McClure Motorsports	Chevrolet	24.023	149.856
45	33	Scott Wimmer	Richard Childress Racing	Chevrolet	24.035	149.782
46	06	Sam Hornish Jr.	Penske Racing South	Dodge	24.073	149.545
47	37	Kevin Lepage	Front Row Motorsports	Dodge	24.082	149.489
48	22	Dave Blaney	Bill Davis Racing	Toyota	24.157	149.025
49	36	Jeremy Mayfield	Bill Davis Racing	Toyota	24.242	148.503
^{1} Moved to the back of the field for changing engines (#84)
^{2} Grid position set by owner points

== Race ==
Live television coverage of the race began at 1:00 p.m. Eastern Daylight Time in the United States on ABC. Around the start of the race, weather conditions were sunny and clear with the air temperature at 79 °F (26 °C); a ten percent chance of rain was forecast. Dan Schafer, Pastor of Calvary Assembly of God in Hightstown, New Jersey, began pre-race ceremonies with an invocation. America's Got Talent finalist Julienne Irwin performed the national anthem, and Chrysler chairman and chief executive officer Bob Nardelli commanded the drivers to start their engines. During the pace laps, Allmendinger moved to the rear of the grid because he changed engines.

The race began at 1:47 p.m. Johnson maintained by the lead by turning to the right of the track, as Hamlin passed Montoya for second place. On the second lap, Hamlin made contact with Johnson which got the latter loose, and he became the new leader. Montoya ran on the top groove and fell from second to tenth in the first ten laps. The first caution was given on lap 12. David Gilliland tagged the rear of Johnny Sauter's car leaving turn four, sending Sauter into the left-hand side wall on the front stretch, causing heavy damage to his vehicle. Hamlin stayed as the leader at the lap-17 restart. Four laps later, the second caution was necessitated when Ken Schrader spun 360 degrees on the back straightaway after Reed Sorenson bumped him on the exit of turn four. Schrader's car sustained minor damage and he drove to pit road for repairs. Racing resumed on the 24th lap with Hamlin leading Johnson and Kenseth. On lap 27, Johnson lost second place to Kenseth who turned onto the bottom lane. After starting 21st, Earnhardt was running in ninth by lap 35. Ten laps later, Hamlin was passed for the first position by Kenseth. Gordon moved to eighth after making a pit stop under caution.

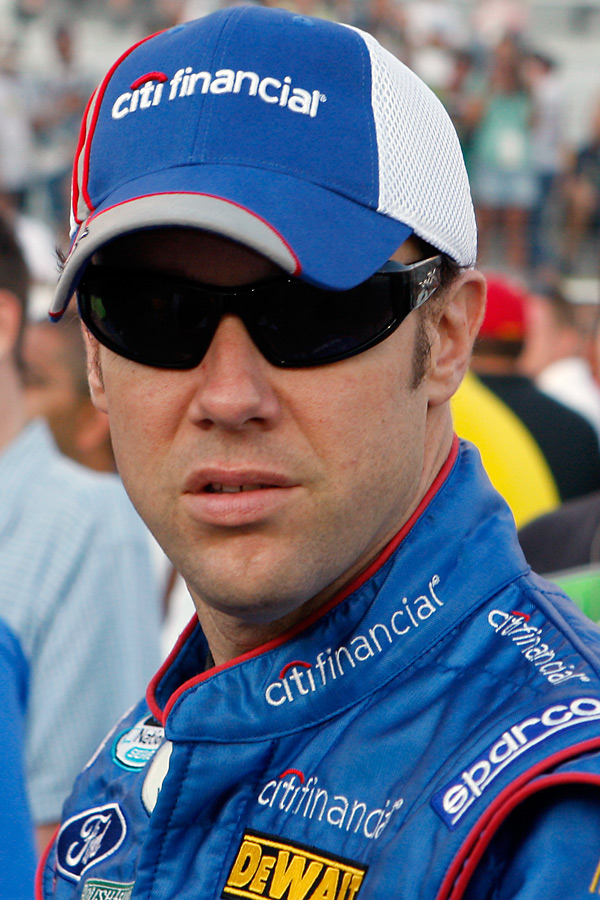
Matt Kenseth (pictured in 2009) led a race-high 192 laps and was constantly in the top ten before his engine failed on lap 364 .

On lap 54, the third caution was waved for debris on the track. All of the leaders made pit stops for fuel and car adjustments. Michael Waltrip led one lap under caution, before returning it to Hamlin after a pit stop. Hamlin held it at the restart on lap 59. Johnson fell to ninth behind his teammate Gordon as a consequence of the pit stop cycle. Kenseth drew alongside Hamlin and the two began dueling for the lead. Just as they were doing so, a fourth caution came out for Kyle Petty who was spun by Schrader in the middle of turn two. Petty avoided contact with a wall alongside the track. The leaders, including Hamlin, elected to make pit stops for fuel and tires during the caution. A tire from Dale Jarrett's pit stall rolled onto the fast lane of pit road, and several cars avoided striking it. Ragan could not do so as the tire rolled in front of his car and he hit it. The tire went airborne into Waltrip's pit stall, and struck the helmet of gas man Art Harris, causing him to fall to the ground. Harris received medical attention and was transported via ambulance to the infield care center.

Kurt Busch won the race off pit road, and led the field back up to speed at the restart on lap 85. Kenseth moved into third six laps later, as Hamlin was battling Mears for fifth. On lap 98, Edwards fell to third when Kenseth overtook him. Kenseth went to the outside lane to pass Kurt Busch for the lead on the 99th lap. Edwards got ahead of Kurt Busch (who was on worn tires because he did not make a pit stop) to move into second position on lap 122. 26 laps later, the fifth caution was waved to allow Harris to be transported via ambulance to a local hospital by opening a trackside gate since no tunnels were available. The leaders took the opportunity to make pit stops for fuel and tires. Edwards' team rectified a throttle leakage problem by opening the hood of his car. The race restarted on lap 153 with Kenseth leading Earnhardt and Biffle. Earnhardt dropped to fourth on lap 152 when he got loose, and allowed Kurt Busch and Biffle to pass him. 16 laps later, Biffle passed Kurt Busch for second place. Johnson's rear-right tire shredded on lap 188, glancing the back stretch wall on his way to pit road, where his team changed all four tires.

On lap 204, the sixth caution was prompted when Hamlin hit Petty leaving the fourth turn, sending Petty into the front stretch wall after he spun. Bowyer also ran into Hamlin and damaged the bracket holding his right-front splitter in place. Hamlin had heavy damage to the right-hand side of his car, while the damage to Petty's car was heavy enough to warrant his retirement from the race. The leaders went to pit road to change tires and make car adjustments. Hamlin tried to get back up to speed on the track, but was prevented from doing so because of a broken brake rotor, causing him to return to pit road with no braking. Kenseth led at the lap-212 restart. The seventh caution was promoted 17 laps later as McMurray and Montoya collided on the back stretch. McMurray's right-rear tire was cut from the contact, and he slid up to a wall, before returning to his garage. Some leaders elected to make pit stops for fuel, tires and car adjustments. Kenseth kept the lead at the restart on lap 236. By lap 244, Edwards overtook Ryan Newman and Kurt Busch to get into second.

Martin moved to third on the 253rd lap. Kenseth drove up the track fifteen laps later, and Edwards got underneath him for the lead. Martin moved ahead of Kenseth to take over second on lap 272. Martin caught Edwards by lap 282, and took the lead when Edwards made his first green flag pit stop for four tires and a car adjustment. The first eight drivers were on an alternative pit stop cycle, meaning they remained on track to try and reach the end of the race on one more pit stop. Biffle, Sorenson, and Kenseth all led during this period. After the pit stops, Edwards overtook his teammate Kenseth for the lead on the 322nd lap. 33 laps later, the eighth caution was deployed when debris was spotted on the track. Most drivers, including Edwards, elected to make pit stops for car adjustments under caution. Kenseth led at the lap-361 restart, but lost it to teammate Edwards two laps later as his engine was failing. That lap, the ninth caution came out for John Andretti who lost control of his car, and made contact with Raines on the back stretch after leaving the second turn. Eight laps later, the race was red-flagged for five minutes for on-track debris and fluid clearing.

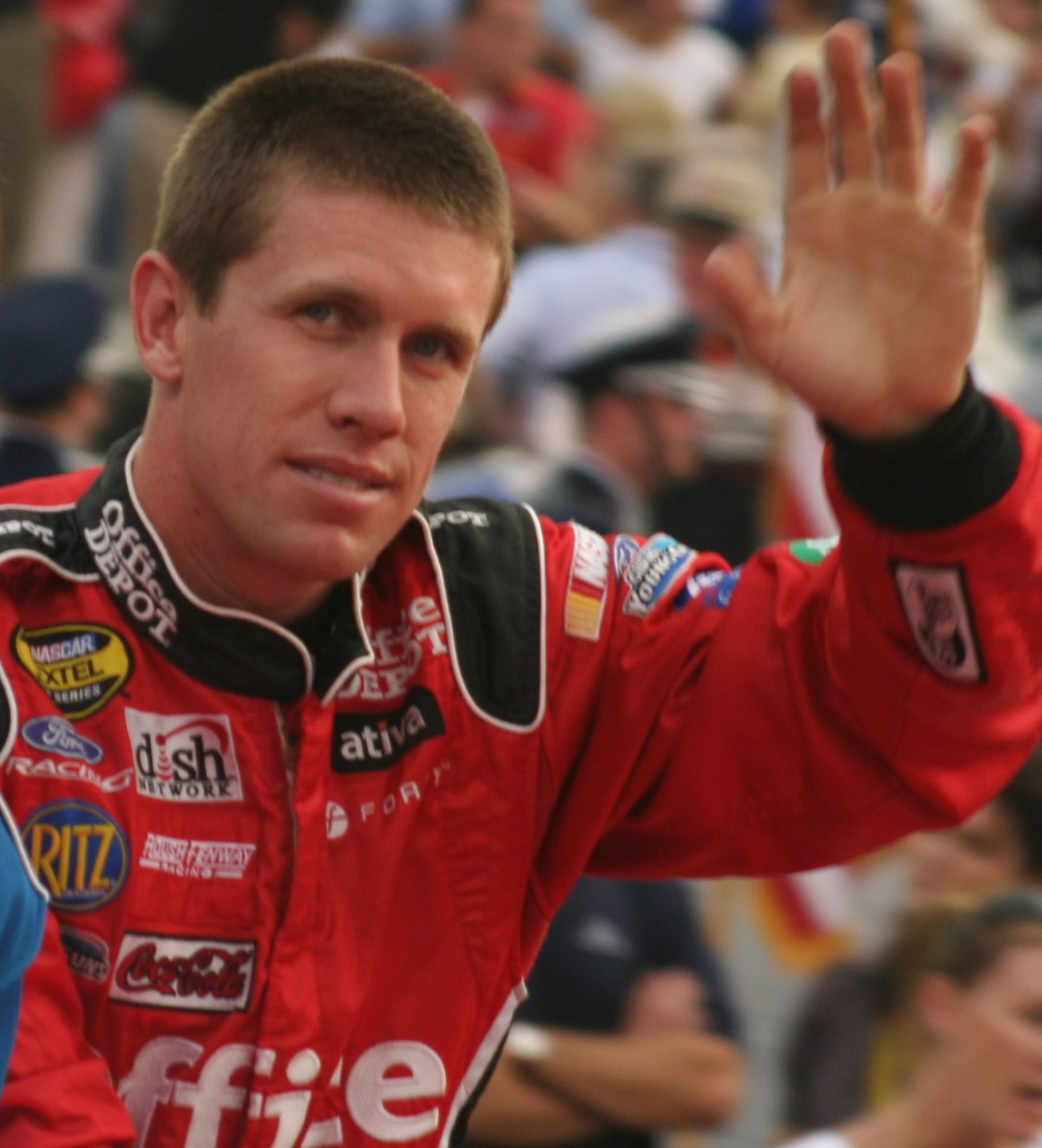
Carl Edwards won his seventh career victory and the 100th for Roush Fenway Racing.

The race restarted on lap 364, when a tenth caution was needed for Kenseth whose engine failed. Five laps later, Edwards became the leader, and maintained it at the lap-379 restart. Robby Gordon lost control of his car in the second turn on the 381st lap, and clouted a wall alongside the track, necessitating the eleventh caution. Edwards still led at the restart four laps later. The following lap, a multi-car accident prompted the twelfth caution and later the race's second red flag to clear debris and fluids in turn three. A car component broke on Kurt Busch's car, and he went into the backstretch wall on lap 386. Truex could not avoid Kurt Busch, and drove into his car, which ricocheted into Sorenson. Kahne could not negotiate his way through and crashed. Other drivers involved were J. J. Yeley, Labonte, Jeff Green, Riggs, Johnson, Elliott Sadler, and Newman. Once series officials lifted the red flag conditions 12 minutes later, some cars made pit stops for repairs and tires to enable them to finish the event. Edwards and Martin stayed on the track, and led the field at the restart on lap 390 with Earnhardt and Biffle third and fourth.

On the following lap, Biffle got around Earnhardt to take over third place. Lap 393 had the thirteenth (and final) caution come out for a stray piece of sheet medal from Truex's damaged car that cut his right-front tire and fell on the track. Fifth-placed Kyle Busch and Truex went to pit road for repairs, while the rest of the pack stayed on the track. Edwards held the first position on the lap-397 restart with Martin, Biffle, and Earnhardt in second through fourth. On the lap, Biffle overtook Earnhardt to move into second. Edwards maintained the lead over his teammate Biffle for the remaining three laps to secure his third victory of the season and the seventh of his career. It was the 100th victory for Roush Fenway Racing in the NASCAR Cup Series since Martin won the team's first race at the 1989 AC Delco 500. Edwards' teammate Biffle finished second, ahead of Earnhardt in third, Martin in fourth, and Kyle Busch fifth. Mears, Burton, McMurray, Stewart and Montoya rounded out the top-ten finishers. The race had a total of thirteen cautions and fourteen lead changes by nine drivers. Kenseth's total of 192 laps led was the highest of any driver. His teammate Edwards led three times for a total of 92 laps.

=== Post-race comments ===
Edwards appeared in Victory Lane to celebrate his seventh career win in the Nextel Cup Series in front of the crowd of 137,000 spectators; the win earned him US$229,250. Edwards spoke of his enjoyment of the race, "Those red flags were killing me. I wanted to win bad; this is the Chase, we're in this deal and we've been working hard. A lot of guys are having bad luck and I'm sure we'll get our fair share of that as well but to see Matt Kenseth lose an engine is not good. We hope it doesn't happen to us and I'm happy we were able to capitalize today," Biffle was satisfied with his second-place finish but said that he felt he could have challenged his teammate towards the end of the race, "I know he's in the Chase and he had a little cushion [Sunday], and I needed a win pretty bad, but we were going to race him clean, but I wish I had a chance at him. It was a pretty good run for us. We hadn't been running like this all season, so it's nice to be back running decent again." Third-placed Earnhardt called it "an adventurous race" for him and several drivers, "We had a lot of luck on our way but we worked really hard to get to where we got. We got a lap down but we were able to get it back. It was a good run for us. It's going to help us getting into the next couple of races."

As Hamlin waited for his car to be repaired by his team on pit road, Petty went to him, pulled down the window net, exchanged angry words, and slapped the visor down on Hamlin's helmet. Petty then walked away. Hamlin took off his helmet and followed Petty. Pit crews and series officials separated the pair to prevent a physical confrontation. Hamlin asserted he did not intentionally crash into Petty, and threatened to assault him the next time round, "You smack me on the helmet and I'm going to punch you in the face, bottom line. So I'd like for him to call me some time this week. You don't come to my car. You don't come to my pit. You meet me somewhere else and we'll settle it. I have the utmost respect for Kyle, but don't lay your hands on my head." Petty accused Hamlin of not being focused after the latter won the previous day's Busch Series race and questioned his driving ability, "He needs to think (about) the whole race, not just part of the race. If he can't think for (400) miles, he needs to start pacing himself. Maybe he used all his good stuff (in his Busch Series win)." Hamlin denied Petty's accusation and said he was more concerned about the Drivers' Championship, "We're in a clutter of leaders and he's racing his own little battle and some days it's your day and some days it's not. Get out of the way."

If [Edwards] loses it by a number less than 25 points, it will be another bitter pill. NASCAR, through their punitive actions that have been arguably ill-advised, has affected a number of outcomes in championships for my teams in the last 20 years. It would be one more. Every time they do that ... it takes the edge off the excitement that I have in going to the racetrack and being a part of the show."

— Jack Roush on the possible implications the penalty imposed on Carl Edwards would have on the Drivers' Championship.

Edwards' car failed post-race inspection because its right-rear was found to be too low by three-eighths of an inch less than the minimum amount allowed by NASCAR. Although NASCAR determined that no malice was committed, it transported Edwards' car to its Research and Development Center in Concord, North Carolina for further analysis. Team owner Jack Roush stated the car was not altered in any form and spoke of his belief that a dent caused the rule violation. Edwards suspected a congratulatory bump from his teammate Biffle caused the car's failed inspection. Two days after the race, Roush Fenway Racing was given penalties for "actions detrimental to stock car racing", "car, car parts, components and/or equipment not conforming to NASCAR rules" and for the rear of Edwards' car failing to meet the Car of Tomorrow ride height regulations. The penalties included a $25,000 for crew chief Bob Osborne who was placed on probation until December 31, 2007. Edwards and car owner Jack Roush incurred the loss of 25 driver and owner points. Roush Fenway Racing president Geoff Smith stated the team saw no logic to the penalty, which they felt was not fair, and announced their decision to appeal.

The penalty attracted criticism from Damian Dottmore of Orange County Register who argued Edwards should have been allowed to keep all the points he scored at Dover and be forced to start from the rear of the grid, citing an earlier case from the Daytona 500 in February when Gordon was penalized for his car violating series regulations. However, The Denver Post's Mike Chambers argued that the penalty should remain consistent in all races after quoting Roush Fenway Racing's opinion on having no more than ten points deducted from a driver in the chase who has been penalized. The appeal was heard before a three-member National Stock Car Racing Commission on October 9. All three unanimously upheld NASCAR's original penalty. Afterward, Edwards said he was pleased to have his viewpoint heard, but then called for an arbitrator to preside over the case, "I was impressed with the guys who came and heard our side of it. They're all volunteers. It was awesome that they did that. But they are all really appointed by NASCAR, I guess. If I could have brought three or four of my friends to hear it, I'm sure it would have been different." The final result of the appeal dropped Edwards from third to sixth in the Drivers' Championship.

The result advanced Gordon to the lead of the Drivers' Championship with 5,340 points. His nearest rival became Stewart who had two less points in second, and Johnson fell to third. Kyle Busch moved to fourth, while Bowyer dropped to fifth. Edwards, Truex, Burton, Harvick, Kenseth, Kurt Busch and Hamlin rounded out the top twelve. In the Manufacturers' Championship, Chevrolet maintained the lead with 219 points. Ford remained in second with 162 points, ahead of Dodge in third with 143 points, and fourth-placed Toyota with 89 points. The race took three hours, 55 minutes and 39 seconds to complete, and the margin of victory was 0.617 seconds.

=== Race results ===
Pos	Grid	Car	Driver	Team	Manufacturer	Laps run	Points
1	15	99	Carl Edwards	Roush Fenway Racing	Ford	400	165^{1,3}
2	9	16	Greg Biffle	Roush Fenway Racing	Ford	400	175^{1}
3	21	8	Dale Earnhardt Jr	Dale Earnhardt Inc.	Chevrolet	400	165
4	31	01	Mark Martin	Dale Earnhardt Inc.	Chevrolet	400	165^{1}
5	22	5	Kyle Busch	Hendrick Motorsports	Chevrolet	400	155
6	17	25	Casey Mears	Hendrick Motorsports	Chevrolet	400	150
7	36	31	Jeff Burton	Richard Childress Racing	Chevrolet	399	146
8	30	26	Jamie McMurray	Roush Fenway Racing	Ford	399	142
9	28	20	Tony Stewart	Joe Gibbs Racing	Chevrolet	399	138
10	2	42	Juan Pablo Montoya	Chip Ganassi Racing	Dodge	399	134
11	27	24	Jeff Gordon	Hendrick Motorsports	Chevrolet	399	130
12	42	07	Clint Bowyer	Richard Childress Racing	Chevrolet	399	127
13	5	1	Martin Truex Jr.	Dale Earnhardt Inc.	Chevrolet	399	124
14	1	48	Jimmie Johnson	Hendrick Motorsports	Chevrolet	398	126^{1}
15	43	55	Michael Waltrip	Michael Waltrip Racing	Toyota	397	123^{1}
16	23	83	Brian Vickers	Red Bull Racing Team	Toyota	397	115
17	12	19	Elliott Sadler	Evernham Motorsports	Dodge	397	112
18	13	00	David Reuitmann	Michael Watrip Racing	Toyota	397	109
19	41	7	Robby Gordon	Robby Gordon Motorsports	Ford	397	106
20	7	29	Kevin Harvick	Richard Childress Racing	Chevrolet	396	103
21	38	15	Paul Menard	Dale Earnhardt Inc.	Chevrolet	396	100
22	18	78	Joe Nemechek	Furniture Row Racing	Chevrolet	396	97
23	39	88	Kenny Wallace	Robert Yates Racing	Ford	396	94
24	37	38	David Gilliland	Robert Yates Racing	Ford	395	91
25	35	6	David Ragan	Roush Fenway Racing	Ford	394	88
26	26	21	Ken Schrader	Wood Brothers Racing	Ford	394	85
27	8	43	Bobby Labonte	Petty Enterprises	Dodge	394	82
28	24	12	Ryan Newman	Penske Racing South	Dodge	386	79
29	4	2	Kurt Busch	Penske Racing South	Dodge	385	81^{1}
30	33	41	Reed Sorenson	Chip Ganassi Racing	Dodge	385	78^{1}
31	34	66	Jeff Green	Haas CNC Racing	Chevrolet	384	70
32	14	9	Kasey Kahne	Evernham Motorsports	Dodge	384	67
33	32	18	J. J. Yeley	Joe Gibbs Racing	Chevrolet	383	64
34	6	10	Scott Riggs	Evernham Motorsports	Dodge	383	61
35	10	17	Matt Kenseth	Roush Fenway Racing	Ford	374	68^{2}
36	20	96	Tony Raines	Hall of Fame Racing	Chevrolet	360	55
37	29	49	John Andretti	BAM Racing	Dodge	358	52
38	3	11	Denny Hamlin	Joe Gibbs Racing	Chevrolet	308	54^{1}
39	40	40	David Stremme	Chip Ganassi Racing	Dodge	287	46
40	16	45	Kyle Petty	Petty Enterprises	Dodge	200	43
41	19	44	Dale Jarrett	Michael Waltrip Racing	Toyota	141	40
42	25	70	Johnny Sauter	Haas CNC Racing	Chevrolet	11	37
43	11	84	A. J. Allmendinger	Red Bull Racing Team	Toyota	4	34
^{1} Includes five bonus points for leading a lap
^{2} Includes ten bonus points for leading the most laps
^{3} Includes a 25-point post-race penalty

== Standings after the race ==
Drivers' Championship standings

Pos	+/–	Driver	Points
1	1	Jeff Gordon	5,340
2	1	Tony Stewart	5,338 (−2)
3	2	Jimmie Johnson	5,336 (−4)
4	1	Kyle Busch	5,330 (−10)
5	1	Clint Bowyer	5,322 (−18)
6	2	Carl Edwards	5,312 (−28)
7	1	Martin Truex Jr.	5,294 (−46)
8	3	Jeff Burton	5,265 (−75)
9	1	Kevin Harvick	5,225 (−115)
10	3	Matt Kenseth	5,224 (−116)
11	1	Kurt Busch	5,189 (−151)
12	3	Denny Hamlin	5,182 (−158)

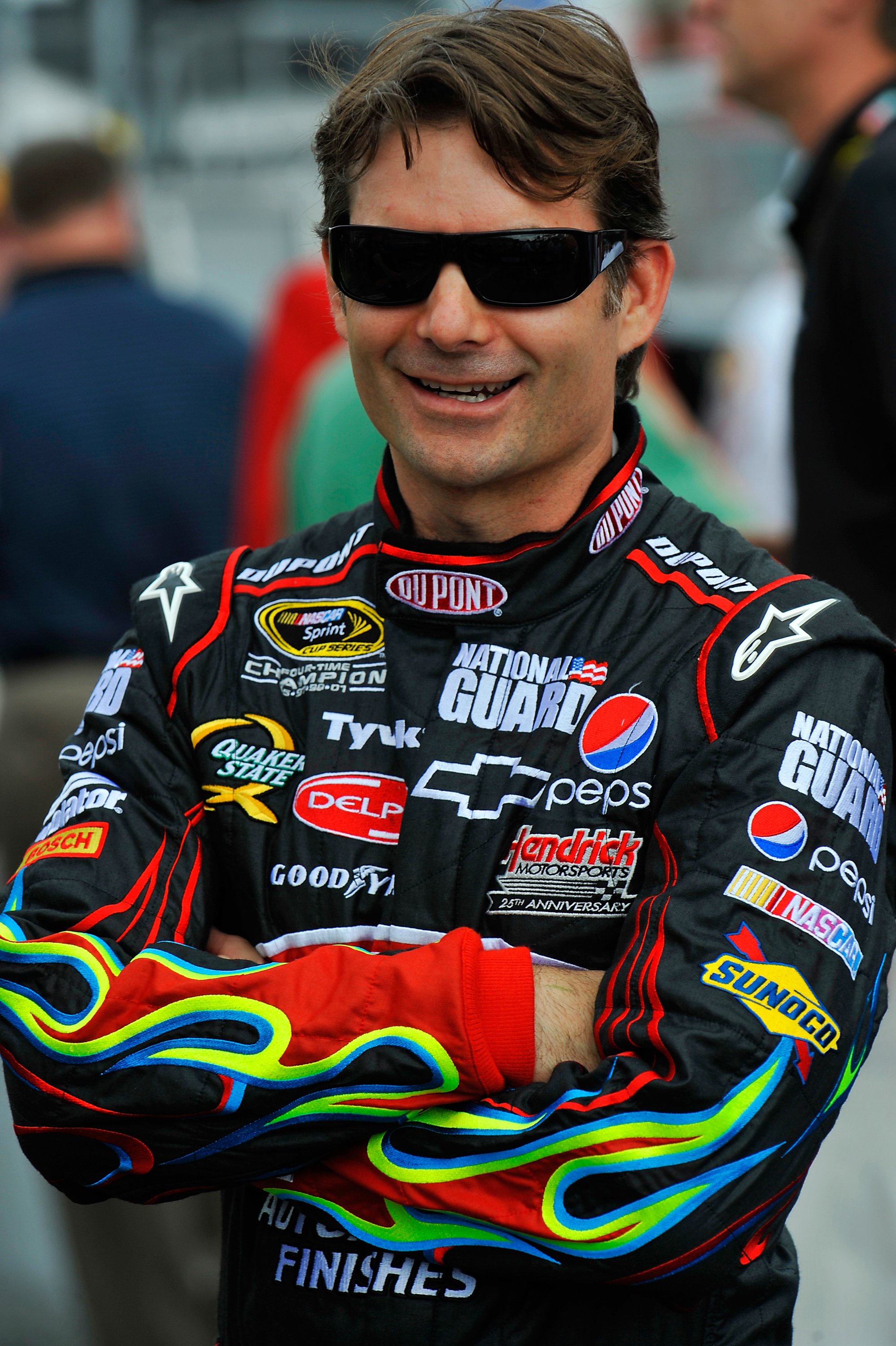
Jeff Gordon (pictured in 2009) became the new points leader after the race.

Manufacturers' Championship standings

Pos	+/–	Manufacturer	Points
1		Chevrolet	219
2		Ford	162 (−73)
3		Dodge	143 (−87)
4		Toyota	88 (−140)

- Note: Only the top twelve positions are included for the driver standings. These drivers qualified for the Chase for the Nextel Cup.

Previous race: 2007 Sylvania 300	Nextel Cup Series; 2007 season	Next race: 2007 LifeLock 400
