= Butterscotch (disambiguation) =

Butterscotch is a type of candy.

Butterscotch may also refer to:

- Butterscotch (band), a soft rock band from England
- Butterscotch (performer), an American musician
