= Terry Fator =

American comedian (born 1965)

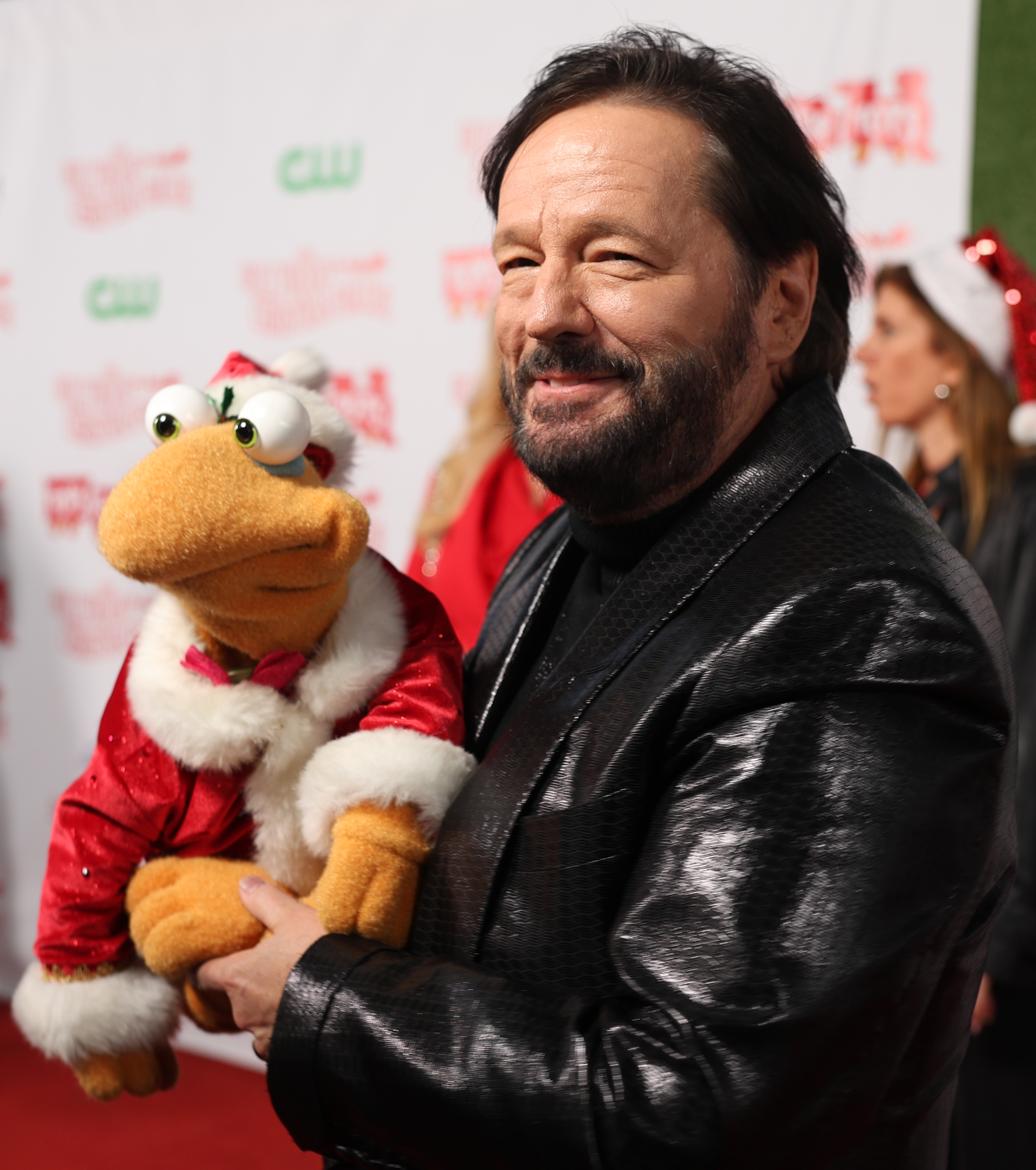
- Fator in 2025
- Born: Terry Wayne Fator; June 10, 1965 (age 61); Dallas, Texas, U.S.
- Education: Liberty University
- Spouses: Melinda Fator (m. 1991; div. 2010); Taylor Makakoa (m. 2010; div. 2015); Angie Fiore (m. 2015)

Comedy career
- Years active: 1975–present
- Medium: Stand-up; television
- Genres: Ventriloquism; impressionist; character comedy; musical comedy
- Website: terryfator.com

Terry Wayne Fator (/ˈfeɪtər/ FAY-tər; born June 10, 1965) is an American ventriloquist, impressionist, stand-up comedian, and singer. Born in Dallas he developed an interest in ventriloquism from a young age, developing both this and a talent for singing. After initially performing with two bands, Fator eventually conducted solo performances, combining ventriloquism and singing with comedy. He gained national recognition for his talent when he won the second season of America's Got Talent, which helped to boost his career.

His success led to him receiving a five-year multi-million dollar contract to headline shows in Las Vegas From 2009 to 2020, he was the headliner at Mirage Las Vegas. Since 2021, he performs regularly at New York-New York Hotel and Casino. He has used his performances and talent to help contribute to charitable causes. Fator is consistently ranked among the world's highest-paid comedians.

== Early life ==
Terry Fator was born in Dallas. In an audio commentary of Terry Fator: Live from Las Vegas (2009) he said that he went to college at Liberty University in Lynchburg, Virginia. In fifth grade while looking for a book for an assignment related to Valentine's Day, he came across a book about ventriloquism titled, Ventriloquism for Fun and Profit, by Paul Winchell.

Fator checked out the book and delved into ventriloquism. A few weeks later, he purchased a Willie Talk dummy from Sears and won a $25 prize for a performance at a church picnic soon after that. He got his first ventriloquism dummy when he was ten years old. Throughout his childhood, he entertained family and friends with his ventriloquism and did impersonations of singers and actors. Fator's mother saved up her money for three years and bought him his first puppet when he was 18 years old. Fator says he found he had the ability to impersonate singers by practicing ventriloquism while driving his car. "One of the reasons I learned how to sing as a ventriloquist was because I like singing in the car," he says. "I’d see other people singing in the car, and they looked goofy, so I’d do it without moving my lips."

== Career ==
=== Early years ===
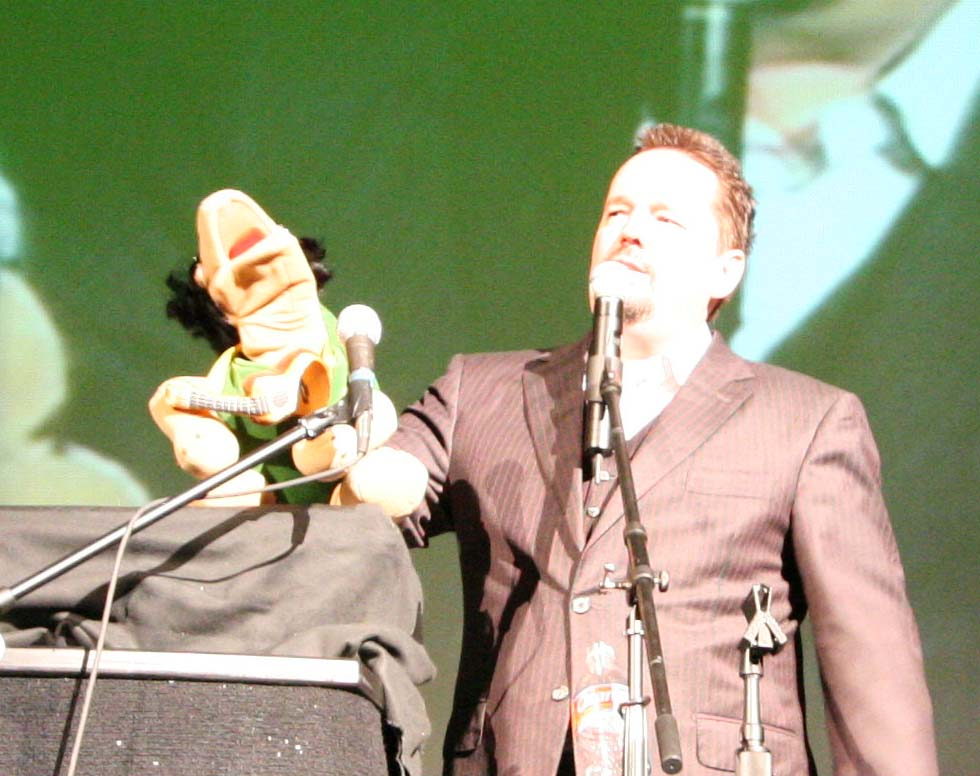
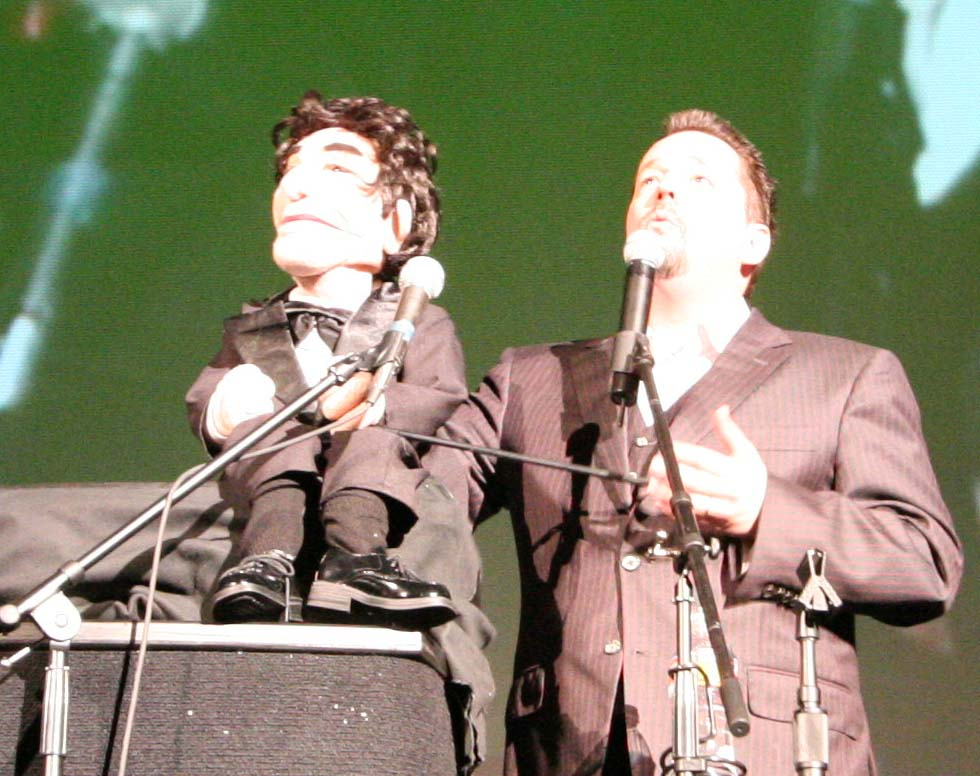
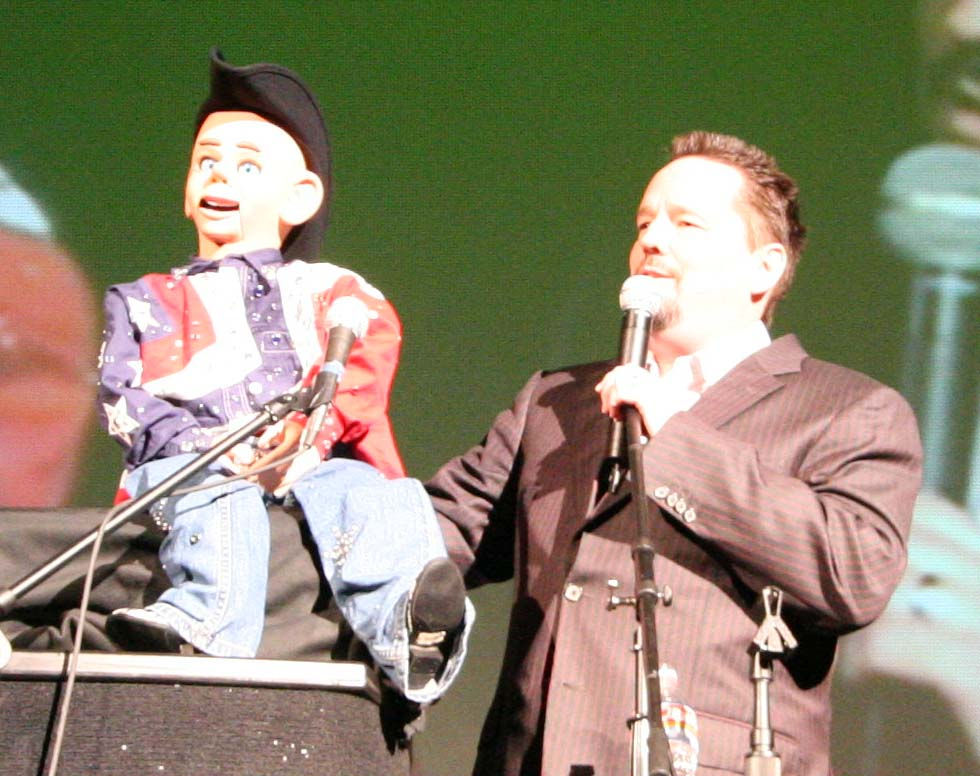
Fator at the Poncan Theatre in Ponca City, Oklahoma on May 6, 2008 with Winston the Impersonating Turtle (top), Johnny Vegas (middle), and Walter T. Airedale (bottom)

Fator got his start touring as the lead singer of the band "Freedom Jam" in 1987–88, produced by Young American Showcase, taking part in performances at over 200 high schools and middle schools across the United States and Canada, and averaging around three performances per school day. In mid-1988, he became the lead singer for the showband 'Texas the Band', incorporating his puppet Walter T. Airedale into his shows. The band dropped plans to sign to a major record label, when a representative from the brand asked Fator to sing in his own voice, upon noticing he sang songs by impersonating their original vocalists.

After leaving the band, Fator began doing solo acts that combined comedy and ventriloquism but struggled for several years to achieve success. Alongside having to conduct events at fairs, sometimes suffering heat stroke when assigned to performing routines during hot afternoons, he suffered a setback in one performance when his show in a 1,000-seat theater was attended by only a single person . Discouraged, Fator contemplated pursuing another career but was encouraged by his family not to give up. This led to him expanding his routines to combine singing, ventriloquism and comedy, and sometimes conducting impersonation of notable singers such as Garth Brooks, Etta James, James Taylor, and Dean Martin. Despite this, he remained less than optimistic to maintain a career as a ventriloquist, let alone achieve success:

"It wasn't easy trying to keep going all these years, and by the time I was in my late 30s, I wasn't sure it was ever going to happen."

In 2005, he eventually included impersonations into his routines, when performing on "Friends in Low Places". This decision ultimately proved effective, winning him critical reception from the audience and raising his hopes, with Fator revamping and rewriting his routines to accommodate the elements that made his performance a hit and continued to prove a success in future. His success eventually landed him opportunities to perform at corporate functions for General Motors and AT&T, and serve as an opening act for Reba McEntire, Garth Brooks, Neal McCoy, and Styx.

=== America's Got Talent ===
On June 19, 2007, Fator made his first national appearance on America's Got Talent. Speaking on the experience, he said, "Not in my wildest dreams did I imagine I would win that show ... Essentially I auditioned because the guy that was the ventriloquist the first season got on Late Show with David Letterman... So I figured I'd do three episodes like he did and end up on 'David Letterman'." After winning the show, Fator actually had to turn the Letterman gig down fourteen times before his schedule was clear so he could appear. "My schedule got so packed, and it broke my heart every time I had to turn him down," Fator said.

When Fator first came onstage, judge David Hasselhoff said, "Oh, no, a ventriloquist." "I was thinking, there's no way I would win," Fator says. "I gave myself zero percent [chance]." The judges, Piers Morgan, Sharon Osbourne, and Hasselhoff loved Fator and he won the competition. Morgan told Fator "You're a great impersonator, a great singer and a great comedian." Simon Cowell approved. "Simon Cowell said I was one of the top two entertainers on the planet," says Fator. "Getting a compliment from Simon Cowell, well, not many people get a compliment like that."

=== Post-America's Got Talent ===
After winnning, it was announced on the show that in conjunction with winning, he was to appear at the Jubilee Theatre at Bally's Las Vegas. However, the spots were only going to be 15 minutes long, and in mutual cooperation with his management team and Bally's, the plan was dropped. Fator performed at Christian singer Larry Norman's 60th birthday party in April 2007. Later Fator flew Larry to tapings of America's Got Talent and also to his debut show at the Las Vegas Hilton as an honored guest.

On October 14 and 15, 2007, after winning America's Got Talent, Fator performed at the Las Vegas Hilton; both shows were sold out. He performed several more shows there in December. That month, he signed a contract for $1.5 million with the Las Vegas Hilton to do three shows a month from January 2008 to May 2008. Also in 2007, Fator became an official supporter of Ronald McDonald House Charities and is a member of their celebrity board, called the Friends of RMHC.

On March 17, 2008, Fator appeared on The Oprah Winfrey Show along with American Idol judge and AGT creator & executive producer Simon Cowell. To the amazement of Winfrey, Cowell referred to Fator as one of the "two most talented people on the planet." Fator performed with three of his dummies; country singer Walter T. Airedale performed a Garth Brooks song and Winston the impersonating Turtle sang a Bee Gees song. Julius performed a Marvin Gaye song; Julius was a favorite when he appeared on The Oprah Winfrey Show. "As soon as I brought out Julius, she had this look on her face, wondering what I was about to do," Fator said. "Once I started into Marvin Gaye, she fell out of her chair." On May 13 of that year it was announced that Fator had signed a five-year, $100 million contract to perform nightly at The Mirage on the Las Vegas Strip. He replaced headliner Danny Gans and the theater was renamed the Terry Fator Theatre. Reportedly, Fator's deal was one of the largest entertainment deals in Las Vegas history.

In 2009, Fator published the autobiography Who's the Dummy Now?. On September 10, 2008, Fator reappeared as a guest on America's Got Talent for their Top Twenty Results Show. He brought back a larger Winston the Impersonating Turtle to sing the Marvin Gaye song "Let's Get It On". Maynard Thomkins was also brought on to sing "Viva Las Vegas". Winston was not the only puppet that was reconfigured, for on an August 1, 2008, ABC News Now interview, he brought a reshaped Emma Taylor to sing "At Last." Fator has fought to be taken seriously as a ventriloquist. "There have been so few good, successful ventriloquists – Edgar Bergen in the 1940s and Paul Winchell in the 1960s were respected and successful," says Fator. "And in the 1970s, I used to watch Willie Tyler and his Lester as well as Jay Johnson and Bob. But over the years, there have been so many bad ventriloquists - and most of them doing corny shows for children - that people began to think of us as a bad joke."

Also, on September 14, 2011, he was invited once again to perform as a guest on the finals of America's Got Talent. This time he brought Julius, the soul singer, and performed "Ain't No Sunshine". In 2013, he voiced a character on the Disney Channel show Mickey Mouse. On May 30 of that year, Fator celebrated his 1,000th show at The Mirage Hotel & Casino and returned to perform as a guest on America's Got Talent during the Top 12 results show four months later on September 11. On September 16, 2015, Fator made a guest appearance on America's Got Talent during the finals show, performing alongside the eventual tenth-season winner, ventriloquist Paul Zerdin. On September 20, 2017, he made another guest appearance during AGT's twelfth-season finale, performing alongside eventual winner Darci Lynne, another singing ventriloquist. In AGT's 17th season he entered the competition, and although he was eliminated before the finals, he performed with Ana-Maria Mărgean another singing ventiloquist on September 27, 2022. In July 2020, Fator's residency at the Mirage in Las Vegas ended after 11 years. On May 26, 2024 he started a new residency at The STRAT in Las Vegas featuring a state-of-the-art theater and combined his natural talent with 21st century technology.

== Personal life ==
Fator's second cousin is Chris Sligh, an American Idol season six finalist.

=== Charitable work ===
In July 2007 Fator appeared in Montana to raise funds for the Kidsports Sports Complex in Kalispell Montana and said he wanted to come back in 2008 to do another show. “We thought, we bet he wants to, but we bet he won’t have time,” said Nancy Manning of Rotary Club of Kalispell. “He made time because it’s so important to him.” All proceeds from Fator's show went towards the field. In 2007 Fator performed a benefit for families of miners in Huntington, Utah.

In 2008, Fator performed at the Palace Theatre in Corsicana, Texas. Proceeds benefited the Navarro Council of the Arts and the Mildred Drama Club. He is a native of Corsicana. On September 3, 2007, Fator made a special appearance in the Jerry Lewis MDA Telethon at the South Point Hotel and Casino in Las Vegas, thanking the crowd for the support. He brought back Emma Taylor to sing "At Last" and Winston the Turtle to sing "What a Wonderful World". He returned to the Telethon on September 1, 2008 and brought Julius to sing "Only You" from The Platters, Marvin Gaye's song, "Let's Get It On," and "Crazy" by Gnarls Barkley. Maynard Thompkins was also brought on to sing "Viva Las Vegas" to finish the show. Fator made his 3rd consecutive telethon appearance (this time via satellite from his showroom during a performance of his show) on September 6, 2009 with puppets The Fifth Beatle and Vikki The Cougar with special guests The Commodores, who joined Fator performing "Brick House".

In 2010, Fator ate a doodle for a charity celebrity doodle auction for Neurofibromatosis, more commonly known as NF. 100% of the profit from all the doodles went to help families with NF. All proceeds from Fator's original song "Horses in Heaven" go to St. Jude Children's Research Hospital.

== DVD ==
On September 1, 2009, Fator's first DVD, Terry Fator: Live from Las Vegas (recorded during a performance at the Mirage), was released shortly after its August 28, 2009 debut airing on CMT. The DVD includes footage not shown on the CMT broadcast.

Preceded by Bianca Ryan	America's Got Talent winner Season 2 (Summer 2007)	Succeeded by Neal E. Boyd
