= Safety in NASCAR =

Car racing safety

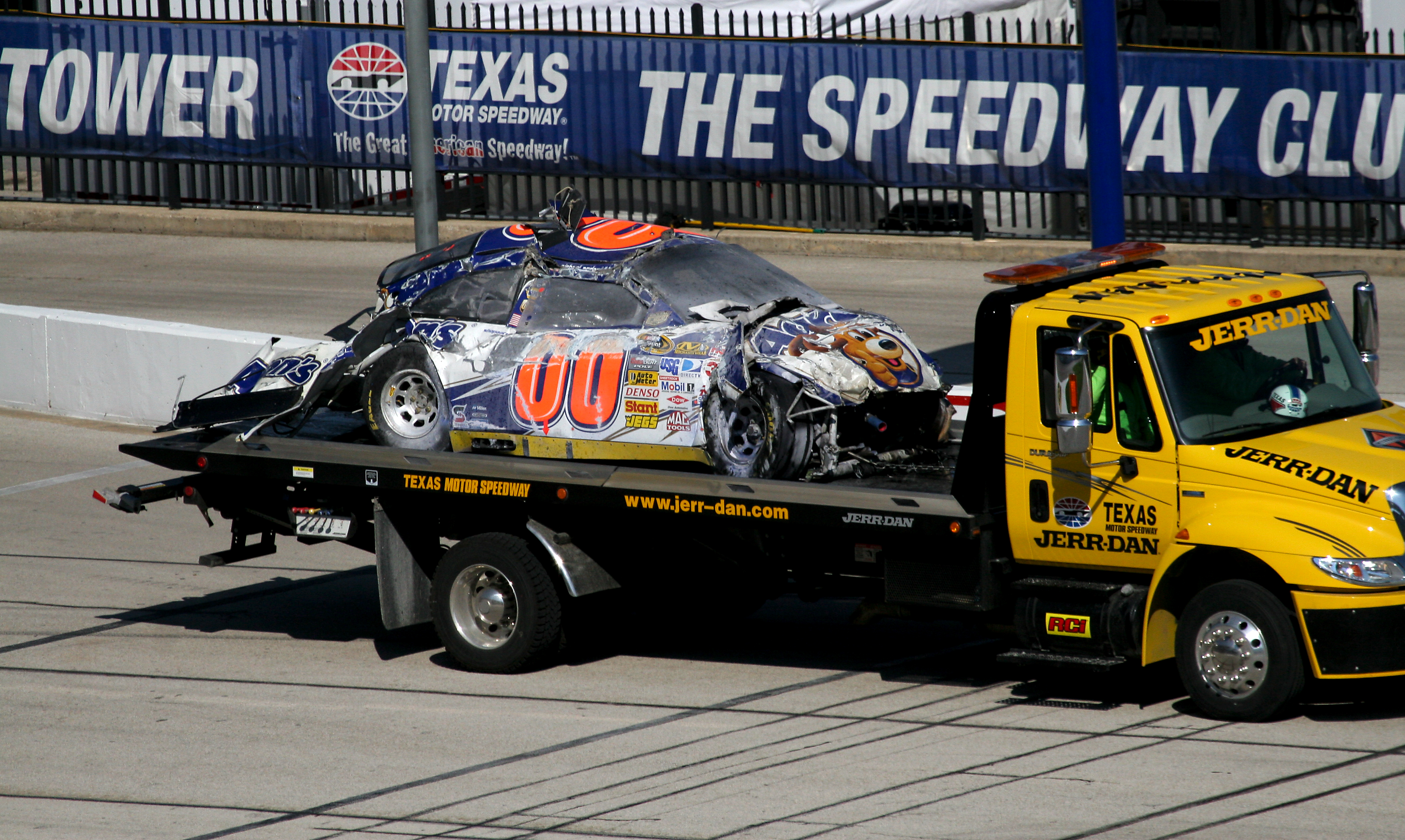
Michael McDowell's Car of Tomorrow after a qualifying crash at Texas Motor Speedway in 2008.

Safety in NASCAR has evolved into one of the biggest concerns in stock car racing's largest sanctioning body. Mainly after the death of Dale Earnhardt, a seven-time Winston Cup Series champion, NASCAR has decided to change all of their safety policies, such as the use of the HANS device. Since 2001, NASCAR has also changed the cars for the NASCAR Cup Series and the Xfinity Series. NASCAR's safety policy includes the racing fire suit, carbon fiber seating, and roof flaps.

== Car design ==
During a series of deaths of several drivers, NASCAR began researching a new, safer car. After a seven-year program, NASCAR presented a design for a new car. The new car, known as the Car of Tomorrow, features a reinforced roll cage. The left side skin has a steel plate for better resiliency in crashes. The roof was four inches (10 cm) higher and two inches (5.1 cm) wider for safety in rolls. First implemented in the Car of Tomorrow was the separated wing. From 2009-early 2010, the wing was blamed for several flips. Starting in the 2010 spring Martinsville race, the wing was replaced by the traditional spoiler. Also new to the Car of Tomorrow, is the stronger smaller fuel cell 17.75 US gallons (67.2 L) for a reduced risk of fires. The windshield is made of Lexan which gains its strength from its flexibility. Under normal circumstances, the glass bends and absorbs the force of the object. Implemented in a limited schedule in 2007, the car was immediately criticized by the drivers for lack of handling.

In 2013, a sixth-generation stock car was unveiled, and the Car of Tomorrow was retired, although it retains some technologies from the previous-generation car. The NASCAR Xfinity Series also introduced a new generation car in 2011 (trialed partially in 2010), featuring the same safety improvements.

The Generation 6 was succeeded by the Next Gen car in 2022 (it was initially going to be debuted in 2021, but it was pushed back due to the COVID-19 pandemic). However, in its first year of competition, the Next Gen car gained safety-related controversies as the car's stiffer rear end caused concussions for both Kurt Busch (that turned out to be career-ending) and Alex Bowman in one season. In response, NASCAR announced changes to the rear bumper construction, rear chassis clip, and center chassis clip for the 2023 season.

Further safety concerns with the Next Gen have arisen following an increased frequency of airborne flips, known as blowovers, in the Cup Series. This is largely blamed on the switch to a flat underwing and diffuser by many, though NASCAR has yet to officially acknowledge this claim. Following Corey LaJoie's flip at Michigan in 2024, NASCAR mandated the inclusion of a second shark fin on the right side of the rear window to increase lift off speeds reportedly by 20%. However, despite the wind tunnel data showing significant improvement, Michael McDowell and Josh Berry both were airborne at the following race at Daytona; Berry specifically going completely over and heavily impacting the inside wall in a manner quite similar to LaJoie's flip the prior week. The Next Gen had gotten airborne four other times previously: when Harrison Burton flipped in the car's inaugural Daytona 500 (2022), Chase Briscoe nearly going over in following Daytona race that summer, Ryan Preece's violent flip in the 2023 summer race, and Brad Keselowski's car lifting up following a crash at Talladega later that fall. Ryan Preece's flip resulted in the backstretch grass at Daytona getting paved over, which is credited for preventing Josh Berry's flip the following year from becoming similarly violent. Similar blowover incidents had previously resulted in the wing being removed from the Car of Tomorrow midway through the 2010 season. For its part, NASCAR introduced additional flaps at the A-post at the 2025 Daytona summer race and made them a permanent fixture in 2026.

== Racing suit ==
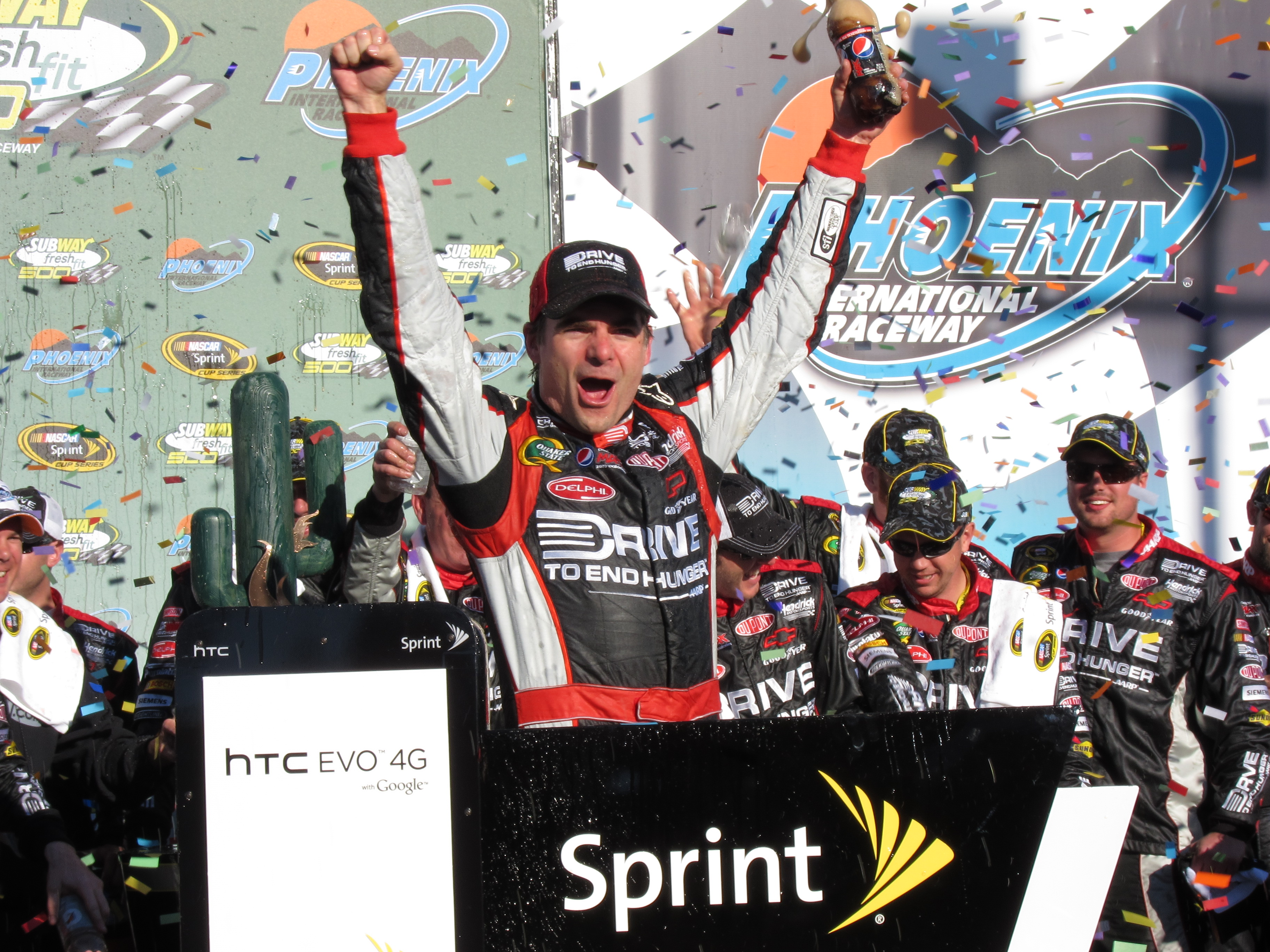
Jeff Gordon and his crew wearing a fire suit for safety.

NASCAR drivers are required to wear a fire-retardant suit and underwear along with certified helmets. This suit serves a dual purpose of identifying the driver outside the car, and protecting them during a fire. The driver also wears fire retardant shoes and gloves. During long races, the heat of the engine might warm the feet to uncomfortable levels, so most drivers wear a heat shield on the bottom of their shoes.

The helmets have many features for both safety and increasing the effectiveness of drivers in the NASCAR circuit. The helmet:

- Protects the driver from injuries.
- Has hook-ups for radios to communicate with the spotter and crew chief.
- May have visors that reduce the sun's glare, to improve the driver's vision.
- Has anchor points that connect to the HANS device to reduce the risk of neck injuries and concussions in a crash.

== Seats ==
The seats that the drivers sit in have evolved over the past few years. Most of the seats found in the race cars wrap around the driver's rib cage. This provides some support during a crash, spreading the load out over the entire rib cage instead of letting it concentrate in a smaller area. Some of the newer seats wrap around the driver's shoulders as well, which provides better support because the shoulders are more durable than the rib cage. The introduction of carbon fiber seats has also helped improve safety, as carbon fiber absorbs more energy from an impact than traditional aluminum seats.

== Seat belts and harnesses ==
NASCAR incorporated five-point harnesses for 1976. Then, they maintained six-point harnesses in 2007 and then the current seven-point harnesses in 2015. After a string of fatal accidents involving skull fractures, NASCAR has made it mandatory for drivers to wear the HANS device, which reduces the risk of head and neck injuries in the event of a crash. NASCAR also allowed the use of the Hutchens device but banned it in 2005 due to test failures. Currently, NASCAR permits any Frontal Head Restraint that is in compliance with FIA Standard 8858-2010.

== Window nets ==
Following Richard Petty's crash during the 1970 Rebel 400 at Darlington, where his arms and shoulder were dangling out of the car, all cars must have a window net to contain the driver's arms during a crash and to protect the driver from flying debris. The drivers are also instructed to lower the window net after a wreck to signify that they are uninjured.

== Restrictor plate ==
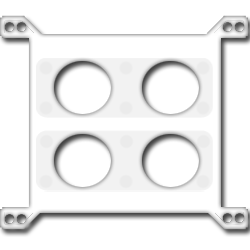
Artist rendering of a NASCAR restrictor plate

As a safety measure to reduce speeds at the two high-banked superspeedways (Daytona and Talladega), restrictor plates are used. There are some tracks, however, where restrictor plates are not mandated and therefore see faster speeds—specifically Atlanta Motor Speedway and Texas Motor Speedway. While Atlanta is generally considered the fastest track, restrictor plates are not mandated there. In 2004 and 2005, higher qualifying speeds were posted at Texas, earning it the title of the circuit's fastest track. Unrestricted Sprint Cup cars produce over 750 horsepower (560 kW) and can run at speeds in excess of 200 mph (320 km/h). Rusty Wallace completed a 2004 test for NASCAR at Talladega in which he used an unrestricted motor to complete average lap speeds of 221 mph (356 km/h) and top speeds over 240 mph (390 km/h). The 2010 width is 63/64 inch (25.003 mm). This is the largest carburetor restrictor plate opening since the one inch (25.400 mm) mandate in 1988, the first year the horsepower-reducing plates were used in the Cup Series at Daytona.

Unfortunately, the restrictor plates have an unintended effect on the race. Because of the reduced horsepower of the cars, the cars form large packs. During a race it is not uncommon to see thirty or more lead changes during a race. This also is the source of the Big One. When a driver crashes, usually, they take that pack with them. During the 2010 Coke Zero 400, 21 of the 43 cars crashed. This is a safety concern that has puzzled NASCAR. However, an unexpected consequence of the introduction of the Car of Tomorrow and re-paving of Daytona and Talladega track surfaces has been the separation of the pack into two-car pairs.

Since the 2012 season, NASCAR Cup cars now have fuel injection instead of carburetors, but restrictor plates are still being used.

Starting in 2019 NASCAR replaced restrictor plates in favor of tapered spacers. These funnel more air into the engine, giving the driver better throttle response and a little more power. As a result, races at Daytona and Talladega using this tapered spacer, tuned for 550 horsepower, saw speeds well in excess of 200 miles per hour. This correlated with an increased frequency for the cars to get airborne until Ryan Newman suffered an extremely serious crash on the final lap of the 2020 Daytona 500. Speeds during this race eclipsed 210 miles per hour at times, with the fastest lap average nearing 207 miles per hour, the fastest race the track had seen since the 1980s. As a result of Ryan Newman's crash, NASCAR reduced the spacer size to allow 510 horsepower along with other changes to reduce speeds and drafting intensity at following races. Despite these changes drivers continued to crash violently and, following Joey Logano's flip in the 2021 Geico 500 at Talladega, lead to further reduction in the size of the spacer for the final two plate races of the Generation 6 car. Due to drag and racing quality concerns, NASCAR increased the spacer size for 510 horsepower with the introduction of the Next Gen car in hopes of promoting passing.

== Roof flaps ==
In 1994, NASCAR introduced roof flaps to the car, which is designed to keep cars from getting airborne and possibly flipping down the track. Following Rusty Wallace's crashes at Daytona and Talladega, Penske Racing designed the original roof flaps. NASCAR team owner Jack Roush helped improve on the design of the roof flaps, in conjunction with Embry-Riddle Aeronautical University, Daytona, Florida. During spins, as a result of accidents or loss of handling, as the car rotates it eventually reaches an angle where the oncoming air reacts with the profile of the vehicle in the same manner as a wing. If the speed is high enough air flowing over the car's overall airfoil shape will create sufficient lift to force the car to become airborne. To prevent this, NASCAR developed a set of flaps that are recessed into pockets on the roof of the car. As a car is turned around and reaches an angle where significant lift occurs, the low pressure above the flaps causes them to deploy. The first flap oriented 140 degrees from the centerline of the car typically deploys first. After flap deployment, higher pressure air is forced through an air tube which connects to a second flap, deploying it. This second flap ensures that, should the car continue to spin, no further lift will be created as the vehicle's angle changes. The deployment of these flaps eliminates most of the lift on the vehicle. The roof flaps generally keep the cars on the ground as they spin, alt.

== SAFER barriers ==
Beginning in 2002 (at Indianapolis), many tracks were retrofitted with SAFER barriers along the walls of the track. These walls absorb the energy of an impact better than concrete walls, while maintaining integrity better than traditional steel barriers. This system costs millions of dollars to install, and the creation of this wall, which connects to the original wall, took many more millions to design and create. Some SAFER barriers were installed in 2003 at Richmond, and Homestead–Miami, others in 2004 at Talladega, Daytona (July, before the 2004 Pepsi 400) and other tracks, in 2005 at Dover and at Watkins Glen in 2010. The Iowa Speedway is the first track that was built with the SAFER Barrier around the entire track. Starting in 2015, the majority of NASCAR tracks have SAFER Barriers surrounding the entire perimeter of the outside walls.

== Pit road safety ==
Pit road safety has become a major focus of NASCAR officials in recent years since the 1990 Atlanta Journal 500, where the rear tire changer for Melling Racing was killed in a pit road crash.

By April 1991, NASCAR implemented the current policy of pit road speed limits. The speed limit depends on the size of the track and the size of pit road. NASCAR uses an electronic scoring system, similar to the VASCAR system, to monitor the speeds of cars on pit road by measuring the time it takes to get from checkpoint to checkpoint. The cars are not equipped with speedometers, therefore during the pre-race warm-up laps, the cars are driven around the track at the pit road speed limit behind the pace car. The drivers then select a gear (usually second gear) and observe and record the corresponding RPM on their respective tachometer.

By 1994, almost every form of motorsport had adopted pit lane speed limits, following NASCAR's cue.

NASCAR does not allow the use of pit road specific rev limiters as found in most other forms of racing. Allowing a pit road limiter would require the addition of several electronic components into the car, and NASCAR has long opposed the installation of electronics into cars, citing the decline of open wheel racing once technology was introduced.

Since 2002 following an incident at the 2001 Freedom 400 where Ward Burton crashed into Ricky Rudd during a pit stop cycle during a caution which resulted in him hitting multiple crew members of Rudd's team and a NASCAR official which caused 4 injuries, NASCAR implemented a rule where all over the wall pit members (including pit crews and pit road officials) are required to wear helmets, no visors needed, full fire suits, and gloves; while the gas man must wear a fire apron as well as the suit. While it is not required yet, it is recommended that tire changers wear safety glasses to prevent eye injuries from lug nuts thrown off the car and fuel spills. Some tire changers wear face shields or goggles. Before this rule change most pit members and teams did not wear helmets and had no face protection outside of a baseball cap that not all crew members wore. This was due to the belief that helmets were uncomfortable or cause worse pit crew performance. Pit members also wore a headset to listen to team or NASCAR communications, many crew members before the rule change already wore gloves or a full or partial firesuit though it was not mandatory for them to wear them.

Beginning in 2008, teams in the top three series may not roll a car more than three pit box lengths to push start a car. This prevents teams from pushing a car the length of pit road when the starter motor fails. Also, outside tires that have been removed from a vehicle during a pit stop can no longer be free-rolled from the outside of the pit box to the pit wall; rather, they must be hand-directed to the inner half of the pit box before being released.

Effective in 2012, teams may not plug a cable that connects an engine control unit to a computer during a pit stop with the car on pit lane. In such cases, the car must be in the garage area for the team to run the cable from the car to the computer. This rule was implemented for the Sprint Cup Series, which switched to electronic fuel injection for 2012. As with changes to car models, NASCAR will institute new rules during a season if it deems it necessary to enhance safety.

== Spotter ==
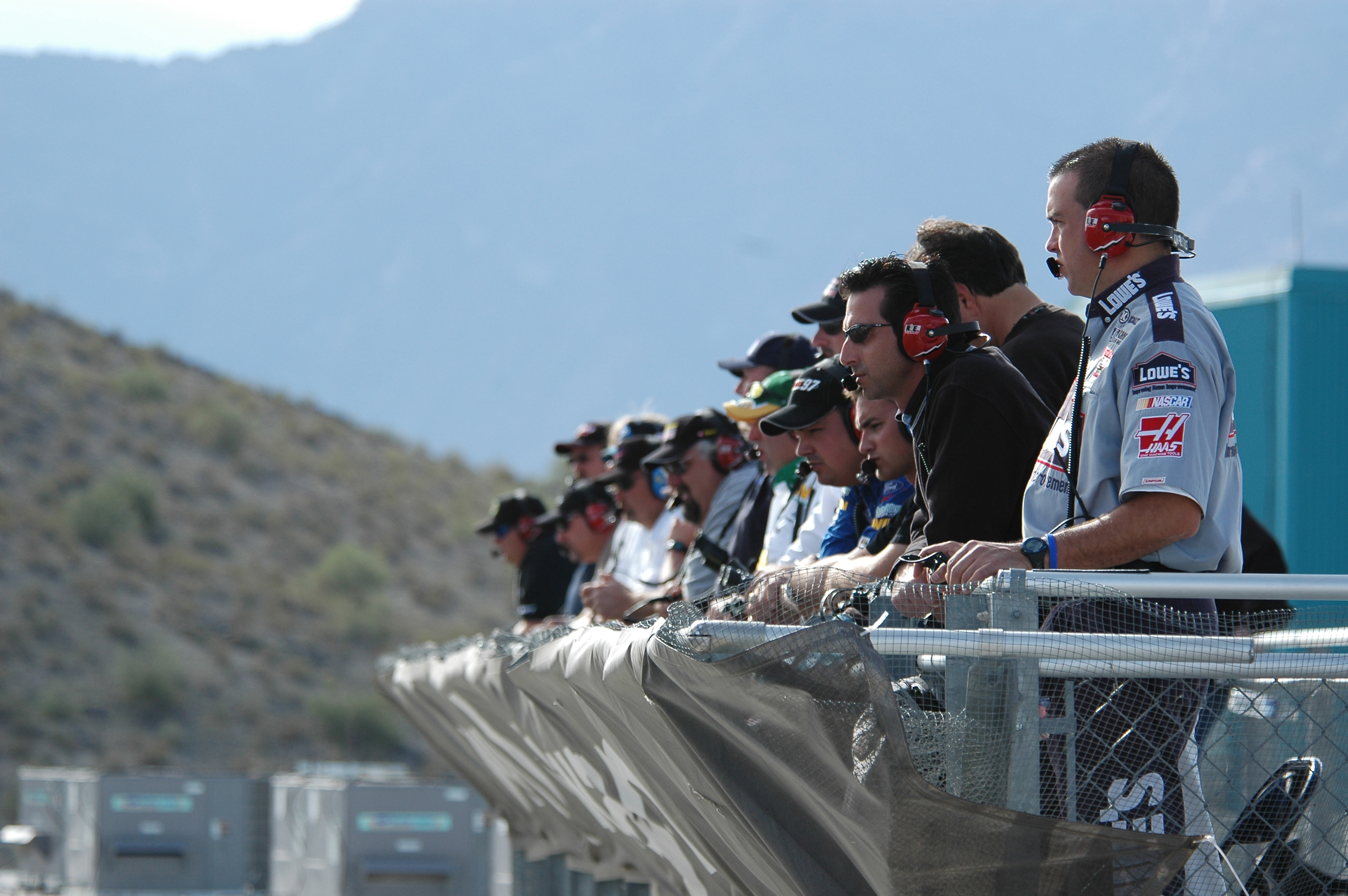
NASCAR spotters November 5, 2004

In contrast with open-wheel, sports car, and touring car governing bodies, NASCAR does not allow race cars to have wing mirrors. Drivers may still use a rear-view mirror and mirrors attached to the roll bar (a rear-facing camera was also added with the Next Gen car in the Cup Series), but no mirror can extend outside of the car. As a result, they are left with large blind spots. In NASCAR's more prominent series, spotters are used to combat this problem. The spotter's purpose is to relay information about where cars in these blind spots are to the driver via two-way radio. Spotters also advise drivers on navigating track-obstructing crashes and may relay messages from one driver to another. NASCAR requires spotters at all times a car is on the track, including series in practice, qualifying, and the race. In many cases, a spotter is a former driver.

At some tracks, mostly the road courses, NASCAR mandates multiple spotters at key locations around the track.

== See also ==
- List of NASCAR fatalities
- Nationwide Car of tomorrow
- Safety in Formula One
