= 2011 Quaker State 400 =

Race details
- Race 18 of 36 in the 2011 NASCAR Sprint Cup Series
- 2011 Quaker State 400 program cover
- Date: July 9, 2011
- Location: Kentucky Speedway, Sparta, Kentucky
- Course: Permanent racing facility
- Course length: 1.5 miles (2.4 km)
- Distance: 267 laps, 400.5 mi (644.5 km)
- Weather: Partly cloudy with a high of 88; wind out of the East at 5 mph.

Pole position
Driver	Kyle Busch	Joe Gibbs Racing
- Time: 29.540 (in practice, grid set by practice times)

Most laps led
Driver	Kyle Busch	Joe Gibbs Racing
- Laps: 125

Winner
No. 18	Kyle Busch	Joe Gibbs Racing

Television in the United States
- Network: Turner Network Television
- Announcers: Adam Alexander, Wally Dallenbach Jr. and Kyle Petty

The 2011 Quaker State 400 was a NASCAR Sprint Cup Series race held on July 9, 2011, at Kentucky Speedway in Sparta, Kentucky. Contested over 267 laps on the 1.5-mile (2.4 km) asphalt tri-oval, it was 18th race of the 2011 Sprint Cup Series season, and the first Sprint Cup Series event at Kentucky Speedway. The race was won by Kyle Busch for the Joe Gibbs Racing team. David Reutimann finished second, and Jimmie Johnson clinched third.

== Report ==
=== Background ===
Kentucky Speedway is one of ten intermediate tracks to hold NASCAR races. The standard track at Kentucky Speedway is a four-turn tri-oval track that is 1.5 miles (2.4 km) long. The track's turns are banked at 14 degrees, while the front stretch, the location of the finish line, is 8 degrees. The back stretch, opposite of the front, is at only 4 degrees. The racetrack has seats for 107,000 spectators. The track is also the most recent addition to the schedule since the 2001 season, when Chicagoland Speedway and Kansas Speedway were added to the schedule.

Before the race, Kevin Harvick led the Drivers' Championship with 586 points, and Carl Edwards stood in second with 581. Kyle Busch was third in the Drivers' Championship with 576 points, six ahead of Kurt Busch and twelve ahead of Matt Kenseth in fourth and fifth. Jimmie Johnson with 564 was 30 ahead of Dale Earnhardt Jr., as Jeff Gordon with 519 points, was 14 ahead of Clint Bowyer, and 21 in front of Ryan Newman. In the Manufacturers' Championship, Chevrolet was leading with 112 points, 10 ahead of Ford. Toyota, with 90 points, was 20 points ahead of Dodge in the battle for third.

=== Practice and qualifying ===
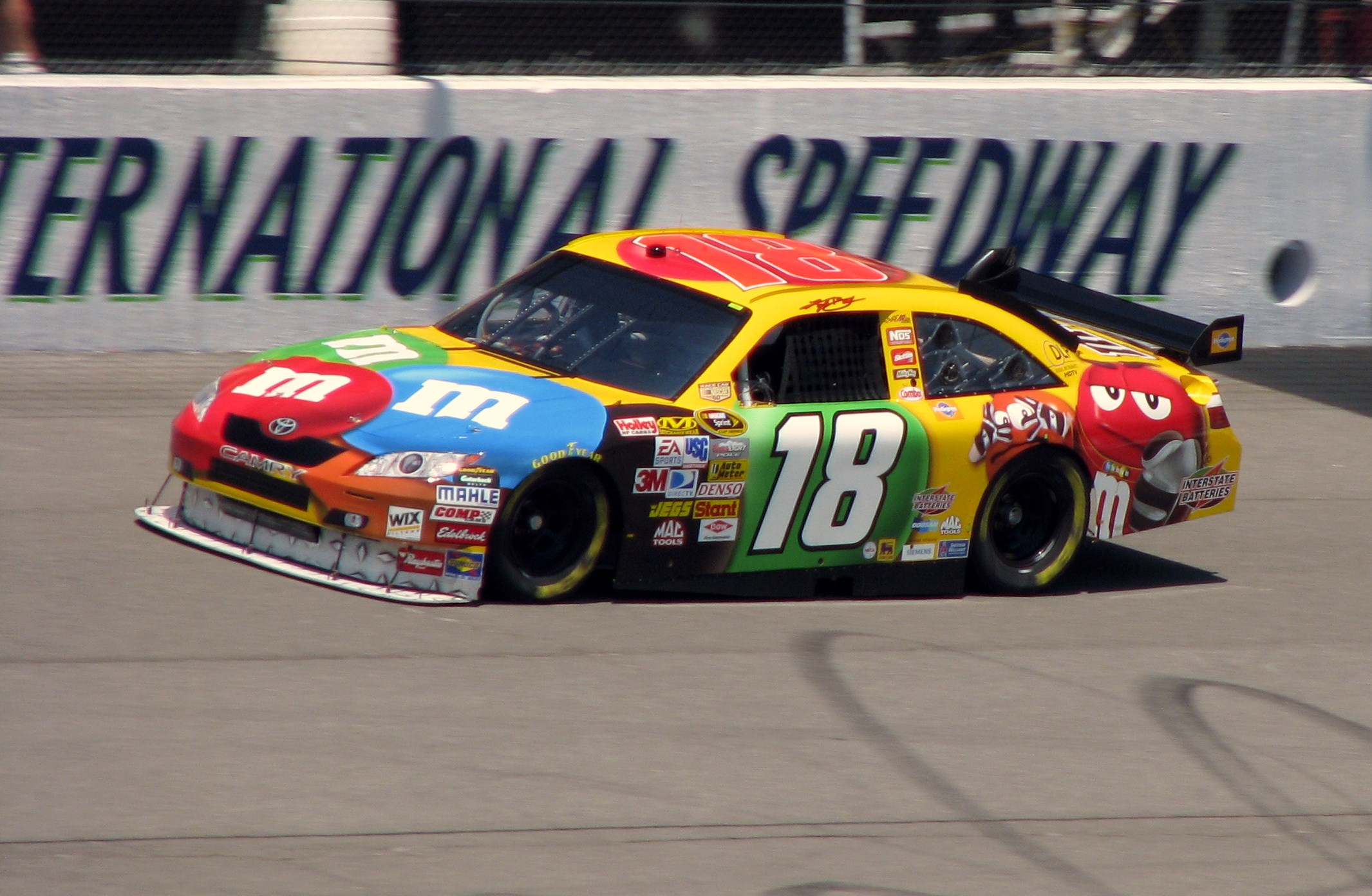
Kyle Busch took fast time during the one official Sprint Cup practice (29.540 seconds). When qualifying is rained out after official practices, the grid is set by practice times.

Four practice sessions were scheduled to be held before the Saturday race—two on both Thursday and Friday. The first session lasted 240 minutes, while the second session was 120 minutes long. The third session was scheduled to be 60 minutes, but was cancelled because of race, while the fourth was 90 minutes. Thursday's sessions was also used to test fuel injection, which the Sprint Cup Series will switch to for the 2012 season. Johnson was quickest with a time of 30.703 seconds in the first session, five-hundredths of a second faster than Paul Menard. Travis Kvapil was about one-tenth of a second slowing than Menard's pace, followed by Kyle Busch, Greg Biffle, and David Ragan. Gordon was seventh, still within a second of Johnson's time.

In the second practice session, Kyle Busch was fastest with a time of 30.193 seconds, only 0.155 of a second quicker than second-placed Kurt Busch. Edwards took third place, ahead of Menard, Newman and Johnson. Mark Martin only managed 7th place. During both sessions, four drivers were added to the session for the fuel injection testing, one for each manufacturer. Of the four manufacturer and drivers, Ricky Stenhouse Jr. was quickest in both sessions for Roush Fenway Racing and Ford. The third practice session, the first practice only for the race and qualifying, was cancelled because of wet weather. Kyle Busch was quickest during final practice with a time of 29.540 seconds. Juan Pablo Montoya following in second, ahead of Kurt Busch, Kasey Kahne, and Johnson.

Forty-eight cars were entered for qualifying, but only forty-three raced because of NASCAR's qualifying procedure. However, after half of the cars qualified, wet weather soaked the track, therefore cancelling the session and making final practice times determine the qualifying grid. Kyle Busch, after finishing the final practice in first, won the pole position for Joe Gibbs Racing He was joined on the front row of the grid by Montoya. Kurt Busch was third, Kahne took fourth, and Johnson started fifth. Brad Keselowski, Edwards, Ragan, Tony Stewart, and Menard rounded out the first ten positions. The five drivers who failed to qualify for the race were David Stremme, Michael Waltrip, T. J. Bell, David Starr and Robby Gordon.

=== Traffic issues ===
To a large extent, the race was overshadowed by major traffic issues in the vicinity of the track. Owner Speedway Motorsports had more than doubled track capacity to 107,000, but did not make any other significant upgrades to the infrastructure in and around the track in order to accommodate the sheer number of fans attending the race. According to Sports Illustrated NASCAR writer Brant James,

Kentucky Speedway's reputation as an epicenter of traffic mayhem preceded it. An increase in seating capacity to 107,000 and an inaugural Sprint Cup race guaranteed that the already troublesome venue would become one of the most inaccessible in all of NASCAR. Fatal vision fulfilled.

Backups on Interstate 71 began more than eight hours before the start of the race. By 3:30 pm, I-71 was backed up for more than 15 miles (24 km) to the north of the speedway. At 6:00 pm, the Kentucky State Police (KSP) reported backups of more than 20 miles (32 km) in both directions on I-71, and backups of 10 miles (16 km) on side roads in the area. The KSP added that traffic was still backed up for miles at about 8:55 pm, halfway through the race. Some fans were reported to have parked their cars on the highway and leave them to catch a glimpse at the race. Others would try back roads, with some taking Kentucky Route 35, with more successful results at getting into the track. At 9:30 pm, traffic patterns were switched to outbound, and many fans who were still trying to get to the track were turned away. Several fans who managed to make it to the race were turned away because there wasn't enough available parking. Those who made it to the race were only reported having to wait half an hour or more to use the restroom due to a shortage of port-a-johns. Others reported shortages at the concession stands.

Bruton Smith, CEO of Speedway Motorsports, had joked on the day before the race that "we expect everyone to be home by Tuesday." Smith was in a much less cheerful mood during the race, telling reporters:

There's 15 to 20,000 people that won't get in here today. Traffic is horrendous. Interstate 71 is a disaster. It may have been OK in 1955, but somebody should have rebuilt that thing 20 years ago.

One of the thousands who never made it to the track was Kentucky Senate President and gubernatorial candidate David L. Williams, who left the state capital of Frankfort, 45 miles (72 km) away, at 2:00 pm. Also stuck in the jam was Denny Hamlin, who live-tweeted updates on his status while waiting to enter the track. Hamlin would, however, make the prerace drivers' meeting and start the race.

ESPN.com NASCAR writer Terry Blount commented after the race,

This should have been a great day for NASCAR, a new Cup event for the first time in 10 years and a sellout crowd at Kentucky Speedway. Instead, the entire day was a horrible black eye for the sport at a facility that was completely unprepared for an event of this size and stature. Traffic jams are normal for a Sprint Cup race. This was not a traffic jam. It was a traffic catastrophe.

On the Monday after the race, the track announced that unscanned tickets for the Quaker State 400 would be valid for any of the remaining six 2011 Sprint Cup races to be held at tracks owned by Speedway Motorsports, or for the 2012 Kentucky Sprint Cup race. In addition to the ticket exchange, fans with unscanned tickets would also receive an equal number of tickets to either of the two remaining major events at the track in 2011—the Kentucky 225 in the Camping World Truck Series on October 1, or the Kentucky Indy 300 in the IndyCar Series on October 2.

=== Race ===
The race, the 18th in the season, began at 7:30 pm EDT and was televised live in the United States on TNT. The conditions on the grid were dry before the race with the air temperature at 81 °F (27 °C). Raceway Ministries pastor John Roberts began pre-race ceremonies, by giving the invocation. Next, Nick Lachey performed the national anthem, and Steve Beshear, Kentucky's Governor, gave the command for drivers to start their engines. Two drivers had to start at the end of the grid because of changes that were not approved during practice; they were Hamlin and Dave Blaney.

== Results ==
=== Qualifying ===
Grid	No.	Driver	Team	Manufacturer
1	18	Kyle Busch	Joe Gibbs Racing	Toyota
2	42	Juan Pablo Montoya	Earnhardt Ganassi Racing	Chevrolet
3	22	Kurt Busch	Penske Racing	Dodge
4	4	Kasey Kahne	Red Bull Racing Team	Toyota
5	48	Jimmie Johnson	Hendrick Motorsports	Chevrolet
6	2	Brad Keselowski	Penske Racing	Dodge
7	99	Carl Edwards	Roush Fenway Racing	Ford
8	6	David Ragan	Roush Fenway Racing	Ford
9	14	Tony Stewart	Stewart Haas Racing	Chevrolet
10	27	Paul Menard	Richard Childress Racing	Chevrolet
11	9	Marcos Ambrose	Richard Petty Motorsports	Ford
12	78	Regan Smith	Furniture Row Racing	Chevrolet
13	17	Matt Kenseth	Roush Fenway Racing	Ford
14	24	Jeff Gordon	Hendrick Motorsports	Chevrolet
15	20	Joey Logano	Joe Gibbs Racing	Toyota
16	56	Martin Truex Jr.	Michael Waltrip Racing	Toyota
17	00	David Reutimann	Michael Waltrip Racing	Toyota
18	39	Ryan Newman	Stewart Haas Racing	Chevrolet
19	29	Kevin Harvick	Richard Childress Racing	Chevrolet
20	33	Clint Bowyer	Richard Childress Racing	Chevrolet
21	16	Greg Biffle	Roush Fenway Racing	Ford
22	31	Jeff Burton	Richard Childress Racing	Chevrolet
23	43	A. J. Allmendinger	Richard Petty Motorsports	Ford
24	47	Bobby Labonte	JTG Daugherty Racing	Toyota
25	13	Casey Mears	Germain Racing	Toyota
26	11	Denny Hamlin	Joe Gibbs Racing	Toyota
27	83	Brian Vickers	Red Bull Racing Team	Toyota
28	5	Mark Martin	Hendrick Motorsports	Chevrolet
29	88	Dale Earnhardt Jr.	Hendrick Motorsports	Chevrolet
30	51	Landon Cassill	Phoenix Racing	Chevrolet
31	87	Joe Nemechek	NEMCO Motorsports	Toyota
32	36	Dave Blaney	Tommy Baldwin Racing	Chevrolet
33	60	Mike Skinner	Germain Racing	Toyota
34	1	Jamie McMurray	Earnhardt Ganassi Racing	Chevrolet
35	34	David Gilliland	Front Row Motorsports	Ford
36	46	J. J. Yeley	Whitney Motorsports	Chevrolet
37	38	Travis Kvapil	Front Row Motorsports	Ford
38	66	Michael McDowell	HP Racing	Toyota
39	71	Andy Lally	TRG Motorsports	Ford
40	81	Scott Riggs	Whitney Motorsports	Chevrolet
41	37	Tony Raines	Front Row Motorsports	Ford
42	32	Mike Bliss	FAS Lane Racing	Ford
43	7	Scott Wimmer	Robby Gordon Motorsports	Dodge
Failed to Qualify
	30	David Stremme	Inception Motorsports	Chevrolet
	15	Michael Waltrip	Michael Waltrip Racing	Toyota
	50	T. J. Bell	LTD Powersports	Toyota
	95	David Starr	Leavine Family Racing	Ford
	77	Robby Gordon	Robby Gordon Motorsports	Dodge

=== Race results ===
Pos	Grid	Car	Driver	Team	Manufacturer	Laps Run	Points
1	1	18	Kyle Busch	Joe Gibbs Racing	Toyota	267	48
2	17	00	David Reutimann	Michael Waltrip Racing	Toyota	267	43
3	5	48	Jimmie Johnson	Hendrick Motorsports	Chevrolet	267	41
4	18	39	Ryan Newman	Stewart Haas Racing	Chevrolet	267	40
5	7	99	Carl Edwards	Roush Fenway Racing	Ford	267	39
6	13	17	Matt Kenseth	Roush Fenway Racing	Ford	267	38
7	6	2	Brad Keselowski	Penske Racing	Dodge	267	38
8	8	6	David Ragan	Roush Fenway Racing	Ford	267	37
9	3	22	Kurt Busch	Penske Racing	Dodge	267	36
10	14	24	Jeff Gordon	Hendrick Motorsports	Chevrolet	267	34
11	26	11	Denny Hamlin	Joe Gibbs Racing	Toyota	267	34
12	9	14	Tony Stewart	Stewart Haas Racing	Chevrolet	267	33
13	4	4	Kasey Kahne	Red Bull Racing Team	Toyota	267	32
14	15	20	Joey Logano	Joe Gibbs Racing	Toyota	267	30
15	2	42	Juan Pablo Montoya	Earnhardt Ganassi Racing	Chevrolet	267	29
16	19	29	Kevin Harvick	Richard Childress Racing	Chevrolet	267	28
17	12	78	Regan Smith	Furniture Row Racing	Chevrolet	267	27
18	16	56	Martin Truex Jr.	Michael Waltrip Racing	Toyota	267	27
19	22	31	Jeff Burton	Richard Childress Racing	Chevrolet	267	25
20	11	9	Marcos Ambrose	Richard Petty Motorsports	Toyota	267	24
21	21	16	Greg Biffle	Roush Fenway Racing	Ford	267	23
22	28	5	Mark Martin	Hendrick Motorsports	Chevrolet	267	22
23	30	51	Landon Cassill	Phoenix Racing	Chevrolet	267	0
24	10	27	Paul Menard	Richard Childress Racing	Chevrolet	267	20
25	25	13	Casey Mears	Germain Racing	Toyota	267	19
26	24	47	Bobby Labonte	JTG Daugherty Racing	Toyota	267	18
27	27	83	Brian Vickers	Red Bull Racing Team	Toyota	265	17
28	23	43	A. J. Allmendinger	Richard Petty Motorsports	Ford	265	16
29	37	38	Travis Kvapil	Front Row Motorsports	Ford	265	0
30	29	88	Dale Earnhardt Jr.	Hendrick Motorsports	Chevrolet	265	14
31	35	34	David Gilliland	Front Row Motorsports	Ford	264	13
32	39	71	Andy Lally	TRG Motorsports	Ford	264	12
33	32	36	Dave Blaney	Tommy Baldwin Racing	Chevrolet	264	11
34	42	32	Mike Bliss	FAS Lane Racing	Ford	264	0
35	20	33	Clint Bowyer	Richard Childress Racing	Chevrolet	259	9
36	34	1	Jamie McMurray	Earnhardt Ganassi Racing	Chevrolet	198	8
37	43	7	Scott Wimmer	Robby Gordon Motorsports	Dodge	90	0
38	41	37	Tony Raines	Front Row Motorsports	Ford	38	6
39	31	87	Joe Nemechek	NEMCO Motorsports	Toyota	37	0
40	36	46	J. J. Yeley	Whitney Motorsports	Chevrolet	35	5
41	38	66	Michael McDowell	HP Racing	Toyota	32	3
42	40	81	Scott Riggs	Whitney Motorsports	Chevrolet	28	0
43	33	60	Mike Skinner	Germain Racing	Toyota	17	0

== Standings after the race ==
Drivers' Championship standings

Pos	Driver	Points
1	Kyle Busch	624
2	Carl Edwards	620
3	Kevin Harvick	614
4	Kurt Busch	606
5	Jimmie Johnson	605

Manufacturers' Championship standings

Pos	Manufacturer	Points
1	Chevrolet	118
2	Ford	106
3	Toyota	99
4	Dodge	73

- Note: Only the top five positions are included for the driver standings.

Previous race: 2011 Coke Zero 400	Sprint Cup Series; 2011 season	Next race: 2011 Lenox Industrial Tools 301
