= Fuel injection in NASCAR =

Technological advancement in NASCAR

Fuel injection in NASCAR was introduced in 2012, having previously been announced for 2011, which was the last season to see the premier NASCAR series use Carburetor. Only the Xfinity Series uses carburetors through into 2021, with no announced change to injection.

Fuel injection technology has been found to be one of the most important technical advances in stock automobiles since NASCAR was founded in 1947. While the sale of manual transmission vehicles would start to decline in the 1970s and plummet in the 1980s, NASCAR continued to hold a strict policy of only allowing manual transmission vehicles in the Cup Series until 2021, when the Next Gen specification featuring 5-speed sequential gearbox.

Cars that compete in the NASCAR NASCAR O'Reilly Auto Parts Series (previously known as Xfinity Series) cars are powered by carburetors; in addition to trucks that compete in NASCAR's Craftsman Truck Series.

== Summary ==
=== History ===
During the 1957 NASCAR Grand National season, president of NASCAR, Bill France Sr., immediately banned fuel injection from NASCAR. This ruling was in result to the dominance of the 1957 Chevrolet. General Motors did not offer many 1957 Chevrolet stock productions with an Manifold injection. However, enough were produced to allow it into NASCAR competition due to homologation rules. This ban on fuel injection would continue into the 21st century.

Initially, NASCAR indicated that it would transition to fuel injection midway through the 2011 season. They ultimately decided to delay the transition for one more year. Starting in the 2012 NASCAR Sprint Cup Series season, carburetors have been officially replaced with fuel injection - making the technology legal after 55 years of being "outlawed." The first race in NASCAR Sprint Cup Series history to use fuel injection was the 2012 running of the traditionally carburetor-friendly Daytona 500; which took take place on February 26. The first series of tests that were applied to the new fuel injection system began on the Thursday practice prior to the 2011 Quaker State 400 race; Ricky Stenhouse Jr. was the fastest driver inside a fuel injection vehicle and Ford was the quickest vehicle. Stock car racing technology had fallen behind the technology used in vehicles that are mass-produced for the general public. The reason behind this is that NASCAR didn't take advantage of fuel injection when fuel injected vehicles started to almost completely replace carburetor-powered vehicles during the late 1980s.

Outside the NASCAR racing circuit, the American automobile manufacturers would make the final two models to run on carburetors: the 1990 Oldsmobile Custom Cruiser and the 1990 Buick Estate. Neither of these vehicles raced in NASCAR during the 1990 NASCAR Winston Cup Series season; Oldsmobile was represented by the Cutlass Supreme model at the time while Buick was represented by the Regal model. Brian Z. France has stated in a January 26, 2012 interview that "fuel injection will excite the automobile manufacturers and stimulates the technology companies"; making the stream of technological advances in NASCAR even stronger.

=== Purpose ===
Fuel injection system

The fuel injection system that NASCAR will use in all future Sprint Cup Series races has been jointly developed by McLaren Electronic Systems and Freescale Semiconductor; each team will have to pay $26,000 per vehicle for the conversion to fuel injection. Its legacy in motorized vehicles dates all the way back to the 1980 Cadillac Eldorado; which offered a primitive version of electronic fuel injection that is found in current Sprint Cup Series vehicles.

Personnel on all the racing teams will have to adjust to the new technology. Restrictor plates, however, will remain in the series for an indefinite period of time because major accidents at Daytona and Talladega made it necessary for a device to slow down the vehicles to half of their normal horsepower. Sprint Cup vehicles (powered using carburetors) can only go up to 185 miles per hour or 298 kilometres per hour at a typical Daytona 500 race while the NASCAR Camping World Truck Series pickup trucks can do up to 190 miles per hour or 310 kilometres per hour and don't require restrictor plates. The fuel-injected NASCAR Sprint Cup vehicles may run slightly faster than their predecessors, also making new challenges for the restrictor plate manufacturers.

Fuel injection allows a precise amount of fuel to suit the amount of air flowing through the engine, making it more efficient. Fuel injection is also used to regulate the horsepower rating of the stock cars, making the sport safer, providing for more fuel efficient vehicles, in addition to cleaning the environment for the spectators in and out of the race. There are more than 150 different adjustments that Sprint Cup Series crew chiefs can make with fuel injection, as opposed to 24 different adjustments with a carburetor.

The stock car racing organization has a special authorization code that keeps hackers away from tampering with the vehicles using workaround programs. Since the cars run on Sunoco's Green E15 fuel mixture, the new fuel delivery system will move the Sprint Cup Series towards more alternative fuels. All the sounds of the NASCAR stock cars are nearly identical to their carburetor-powered ancestors. The ability to download information from the electronic units of the cars will play a role in the elimination of tandem drafting that has hampered NASCAR in recent years.

NASCAR Sprint Cup races can start in temperatures as low as 50 °F (10 °C) without making the vehicles suffer through major engine problems.

One of the downsides of allowing 15% ethanol fuel is the big jump in corn prices in recent years. Even though the 2012–2013 North American drought has made the production of ethanol too expensive to put on a nationwide scale, NASCAR continues to use E15 ethanol fuel as an alternative to their "E0" gasoline that was used in the past. Suggested measures by the NASCAR community could see NASCAR using either bamboo-based ethanol, E85 ethanol from surplus corn or even compressed natural gas in the foreseeable future.

Approximately 75 psi of fuel pressure is used in the fuel injection system.

=== On-track results ===
Brad Keselowski emerged as the first NASCAR Cup Series champion of the fuel injection era after the 2012 running of the Ford EcoBoost 400 at Homestead–Miami Speedway in Homestead, Florida; just as Tony Stewart was the last NASCAR Cup Series champion of the carburetor era. His first full season as a NASCAR Sprint Cup Series driver came in 2010; where he finished in 25th place in the overall championship standings.

The first win of a restrictor plate race during the fuel injection era would go to Matt Kenseth. However, Kenseth simply could not keep the consistency to win any other restrictor plate race during the current fuel injection era. Roger Penske would become the first person to win the owner's championship while fielding cars with fuel injection. Chevrolet has won the first manufacturer's championship of the fuel injection area; keeping their momentum going from the carburetor era of racing.

Even with Toyota's overall success in the 2012 NASCAR Sprint Cup Series season, their vehicles picked up eight engine failures to neutralize the eight wins that they accumulated during the course of that season. Most of these wins in 2012 for Toyota were picked up by Denny Hamlin. Not a single engine failure has yet been attributed to electronic fuel injection. Dale Earnhardt Jr. was responsible for accomplishing the one-millionth mile under fuel injection as he was leading lap 34 at the Bank of America 500.
