= America's Got Talent season 2 =

America's Got Talent
- Season 2
- Showrunner: Jason Raff
- Hosted by: Jerry Springer
- Judges: Piers Morgan; Sharon Osbourne; David Hasselhoff
- Winner: Terry Fator
- Runner-up: Cas Haley
- Finals venue: Radford Studio Center
- No. of episodes: 16

Release
- Original network: NBC
- Original release: June 5 – August 21, 2007

Season chronology
- ← Previous; Season 1 Next → Season 3

Judges and Host for America's Got Talent Season 2

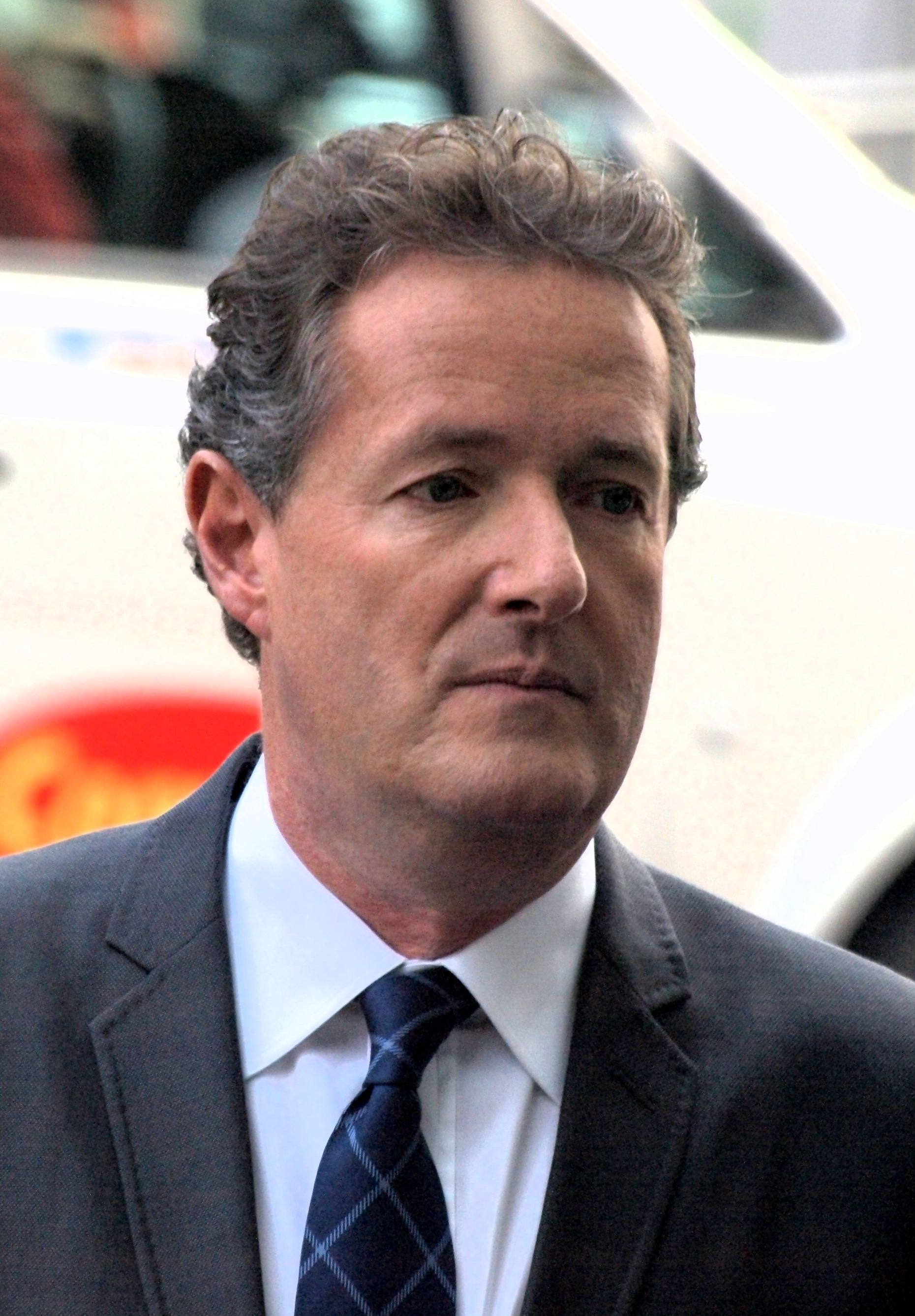
Piers Morgan

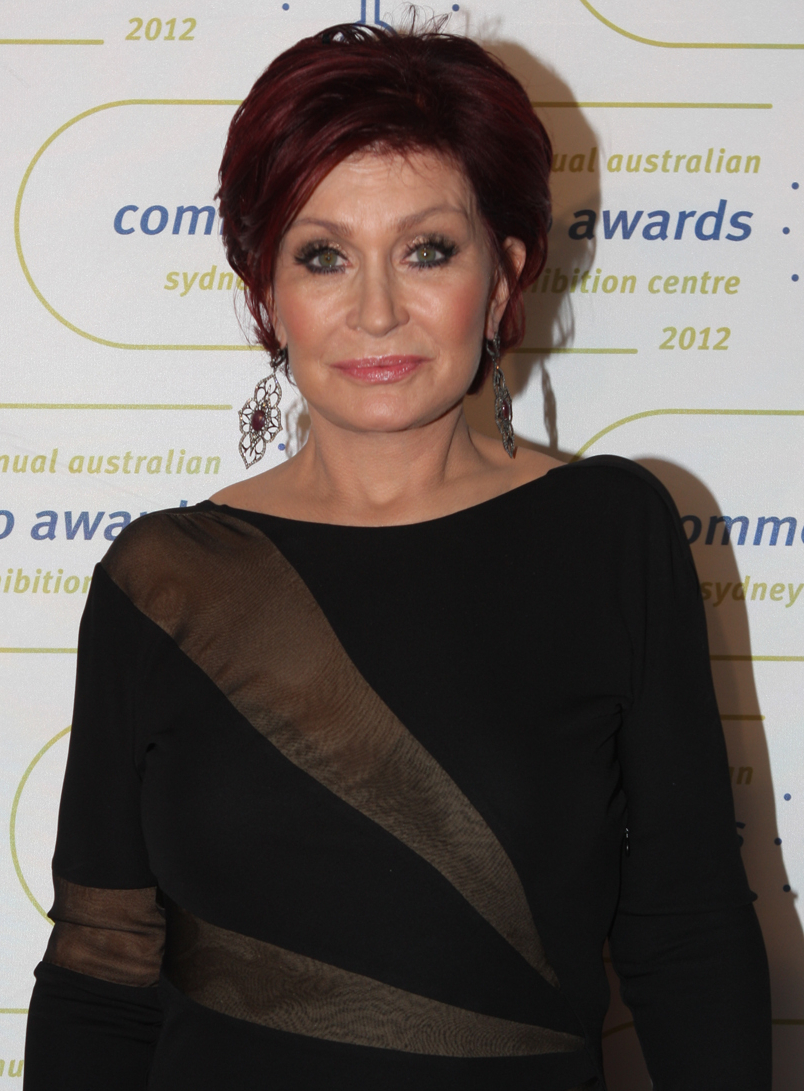
Sharon Osbourne

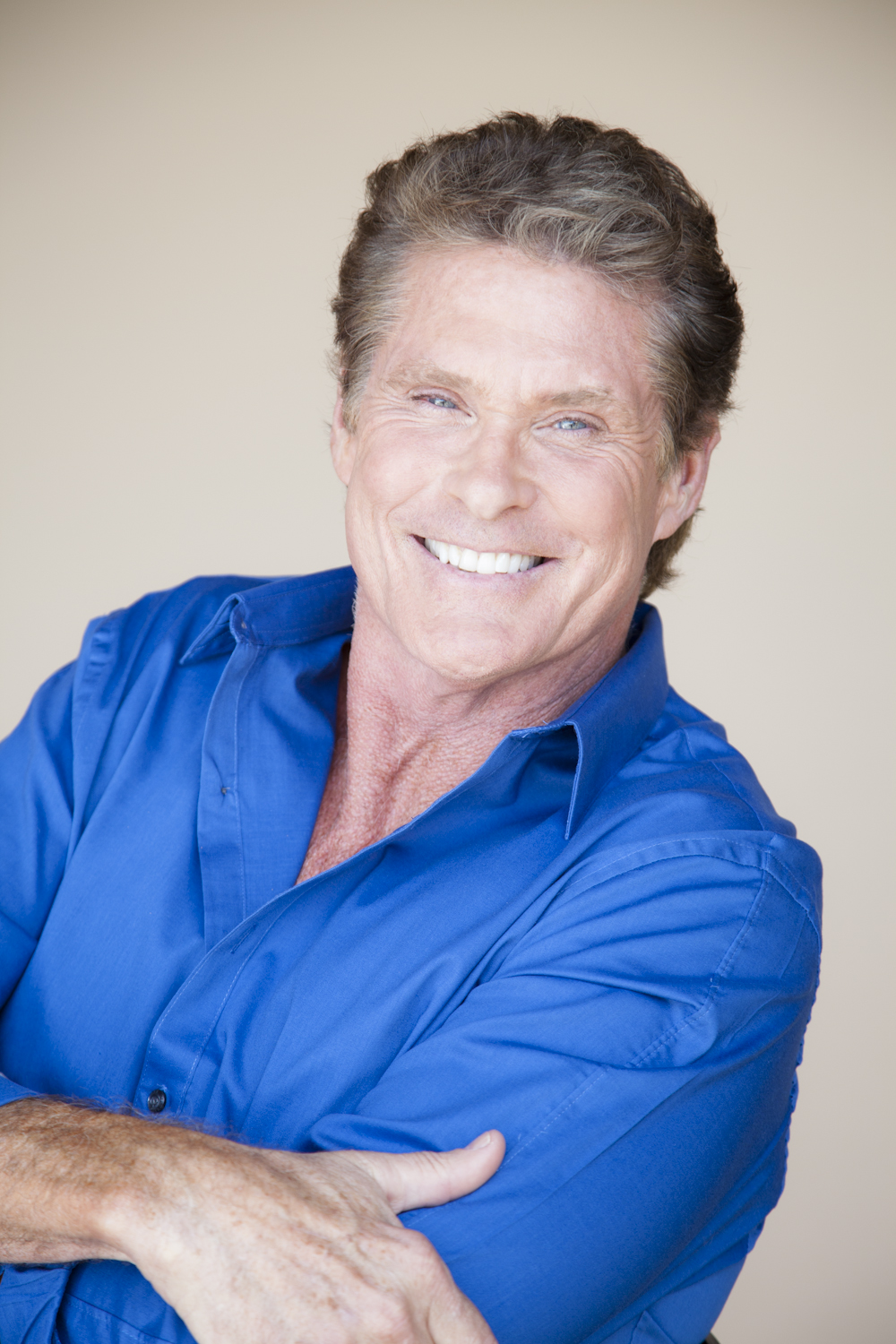
David Hasselhoff

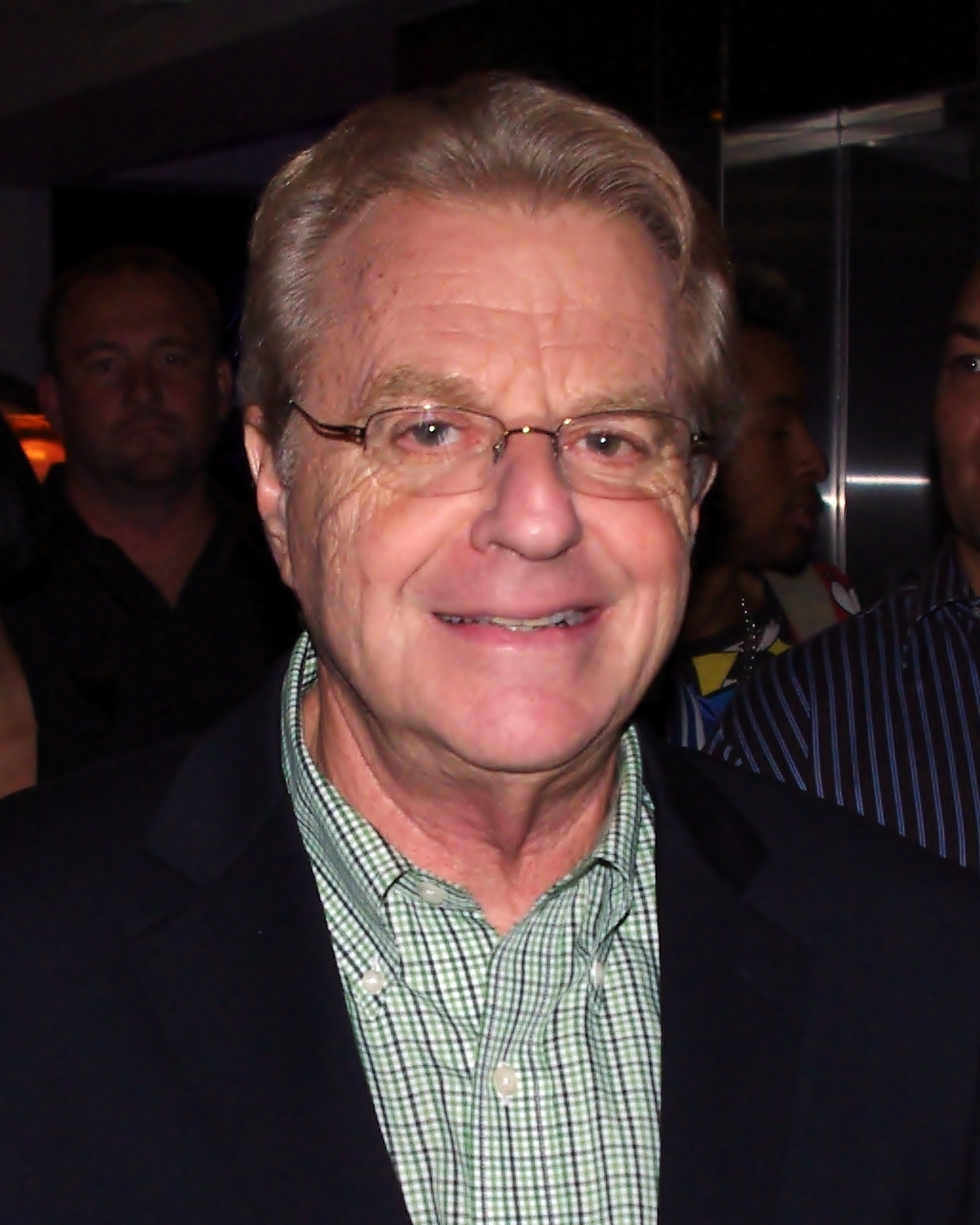
Jerry Springer

The second season of American talent show competition series America's Got Talent was broadcast on NBC from June 5 to August 21, 2007. The network originally intended for it to run during its winter schedule that year, but opted against it following concerns over it clashing with other popular programs at that time. After the success of its first year, additional episodes of the series were commissioned by NBC, with changes being made to the program's format for the new season. The changes included the addition of a "boot camp" stage during the auditions, and the use of the judge's buzzers matching other editions of the Got Talent franchise, particularly after the first season of Britain's Got Talent.

While Piers Morgan and David Hasselhoff returned as judges, Regis Philbin did not return as host for the new season, and was replaced by tabloid talk show host Jerry Springer. Brandy Norwood was unable to return as a judge following the previous season, due to an ongoing lawsuit against her at the time, and was replaced by Sharon Osbourne as a result. The second season was won by singing ventriloquist and impressionist Terry Fator, with singer and guitarist Cas Haley finishing in second place, and singing beatboxer Butterscotch placing third.

== Season overview ==
Following the success of the first season of America's Got Talent, NBC opted to commission further seasons of the program for the foreseeable future. As part of the network's original plan for the second season, the new episodes were intended to broadcast during the network's Winter 2007 schedule, with the results of each live round aired on the same day. However, concerns that such a decision would place America's Got Talent in a direct competition for viewing ratings with the sixth season of American Idol, due to being aired around the same period. NBC eventually dropped the plan, and set the program up for its Summer schedule that year, allocating the arranged broadcasting slot of Grease: You're The One That I Want.

The second season had a considerable change in the format of the program, to match a more standardized arrangement being used across the Got Talent franchise. The most notable change was the filmed auditions being split into two stages, with the first taking place across a selection of cities, and the second stage operating in Las Vegas under a "boot camp" format titled "Las Vegas Callbacks". The second stage's rules focused on those who made it through the first stage being placed into one of two groups: "music" and "variety", having to successfully impress the judges across two rounds of performances, with each three minutes in length and conducted without interruptions from the judges. The other change was to incorporate the live round rules for judges used on other editions of Got Talent, particularly Britain's Got Talent. The new arrangement primarily saw judges giving feedback on a performance when it had ended but still using their buzzers to stop performances, while the public voted on who moved to the next stage in the semi-finals. Other than these changes, the second season did not incorporate the use of Wildcard acts, while the results for each live round (except the final), were each given before the start of the next round.

Auditions took place during Spring 2007, with auditions being conducted within the cities of New York, Los Angeles, Chicago, and Dallas. Following the previous season, prior to filming taking place, replacements to the cast were made. Regis Philbin, who did not to return for undisclosed reasons, was replaced by Jerry Springer as host. Brandy Norwood was replaced by Sharon Osbourne as judge, after she dropped out due to a difficult legal matter she was dealing with.

Twenty of the participants who auditioned for the season secured a place in the two live semi-finals, with ten acts in each moving on to compete against each other in two "knock-out" finals. That resulted in four left to compete in a grand-final round. Here are the results of each participant's overall performance during the season:

Winner | Runner-up | Finalist | Semi-finalist

Participant	Genre	Act	Semi-final	Result
Boy Britney	Dance	Dancer	2	Eliminated
Butterscotch	Music	Beatboxer	1	Grand-finalist
Cas Haley	Singing / Music	Singer & Guitarist	2	Runner-up
Jason Pritchett	Singing / Music	Singer & Guitarist	2	Finalist
Jonny Come Lately	Singing / Music	Band	1	Eliminated
Johnny Lonestar	Variety	Trick Roper	1	Eliminated
Julienne Irwin	Singing	Singer	1	Grand-finalist
Kashif	Dance	Dancer	1	Eliminated
Kevin James	Magic	Magician	1	Eliminated
Manuel Romero	Singing	Singer	1	Eliminated
Popovich Comedy Pet Theater	Animals	Animal Act	2	Eliminated
Robert Hatcher	Singing	Singer	1	Finalist
Sideswipe	Acrobatics	Martial Arts Group	1	Finalist
Southern Girl	Singing	Vocal Group	2	Eliminated
Terry Fator	Comedy / Singing	Singing Ventriloquist	2	Winner
The 2nd Story Guys	Dance	Stilt Group	2	Eliminated
The Calypso Tumblers	Acrobatics	Acrobatic Group	2	Finalist
The Duttons	Singing / Music	Family Band	2	Finalist
The Fault Line	Singing	Vocal Group	2	Eliminated
The Glamazons	Dance	Dance Group	1	Finalist

=== Semi-finals summary ===
Buzzed out | Advanced

==== Semi-final 1 (July 17) ====
Semi-Finalist	Order	Buzzes			Result (July 24)
Semi-Finalist	Order	Hasselhoff	Osbourne	Morgan	Result (July 24)
Johnny Lonestar	1				Eliminated
Julienne Irwin	2				Advanced
Kevin James	3				Eliminated
Robert Hatcher	4				Advanced
Jonny Come Lately	5				Eliminated
Kashif	6				Eliminated
Butterscotch	7				Advanced
Sideswipe	8				Advanced
Manuel Romero	9				Eliminated
The Glamazons	10				Advanced

==== Semi-final 2 (July 24) ====
Semi-Finalist	Order	Buzzes			Result (July 31)
Semi-Finalist	Order	Hasselhoff	Osbourne	Morgan	Result (July 31)
The 2nd Story Guys	1				Eliminated
Southern Girl	2				Eliminated
Popovich Comedy Pet Theater	3				Eliminated
Cas Haley	4				Advanced
Terry Fator	5				Advanced
The Fault Line	6				Eliminated
Boy Britney	7				Eliminated
Jason Pritchett	8				Advanced
The Calypso Tumblers	9				Advanced
The Duttons	10				Advanced

=== Finals summary ===
Winner (Top 4 Final Only) | Runner-up (Top 4 Final Only) | 3rd place (Top 4 Final Only)
Advanced (Top 10 & 8 Finals only) | Eliminated | Buzzed (Top 10 & 8 Finals only)

==== Finals - Top 10 (July 31) ====
Top 10 Finalist	Order	Buzzes			Result (August 7)
Top 10 Finalist	Order	Hasselhoff	Osbourne	Morgan	Result (August 7)
The Duttons	1				Eliminated
Robert Hatcher	2				Advanced
The Calypso Tumblers	3				Eliminated
Jason Pritchett	4				Advanced
Butterscotch	5				Advanced
The Glamazons	6				Advanced
Cas Haley	7				Advanced
Terry Fator	8				Advanced
Julienne Irwin	9				Advanced
Sideswipe	10				Advanced

==== Finals - Top 8 (August 7) ====
Top 8 Finalist	Order	Buzzes			Result (August 14)
Top 8 Finalist	Order	Hasselhoff	Osbourne	Morgan	Result (August 14)
Robert Hatcher	1				Eliminated
Julienne Irwin	2				Advanced
Terry Fator	3				Advanced
Cas Haley	4				Advanced
Jason Pritchett	5				Eliminated
The Glamazons	6				Eliminated
Butterscotch	7				Advanced
Sideswipe	8				Eliminated

==== Grand-final (August 14) ====
Grand-finalist	Order	Result (August 21)
Cas Haley	1	2nd
Butterscotch	2	3rd
Terry Fator	3	1st
Julienne Irwin	4	4th
