= Butterscotch (performer) =

American beatboxer and singer (born 1985)

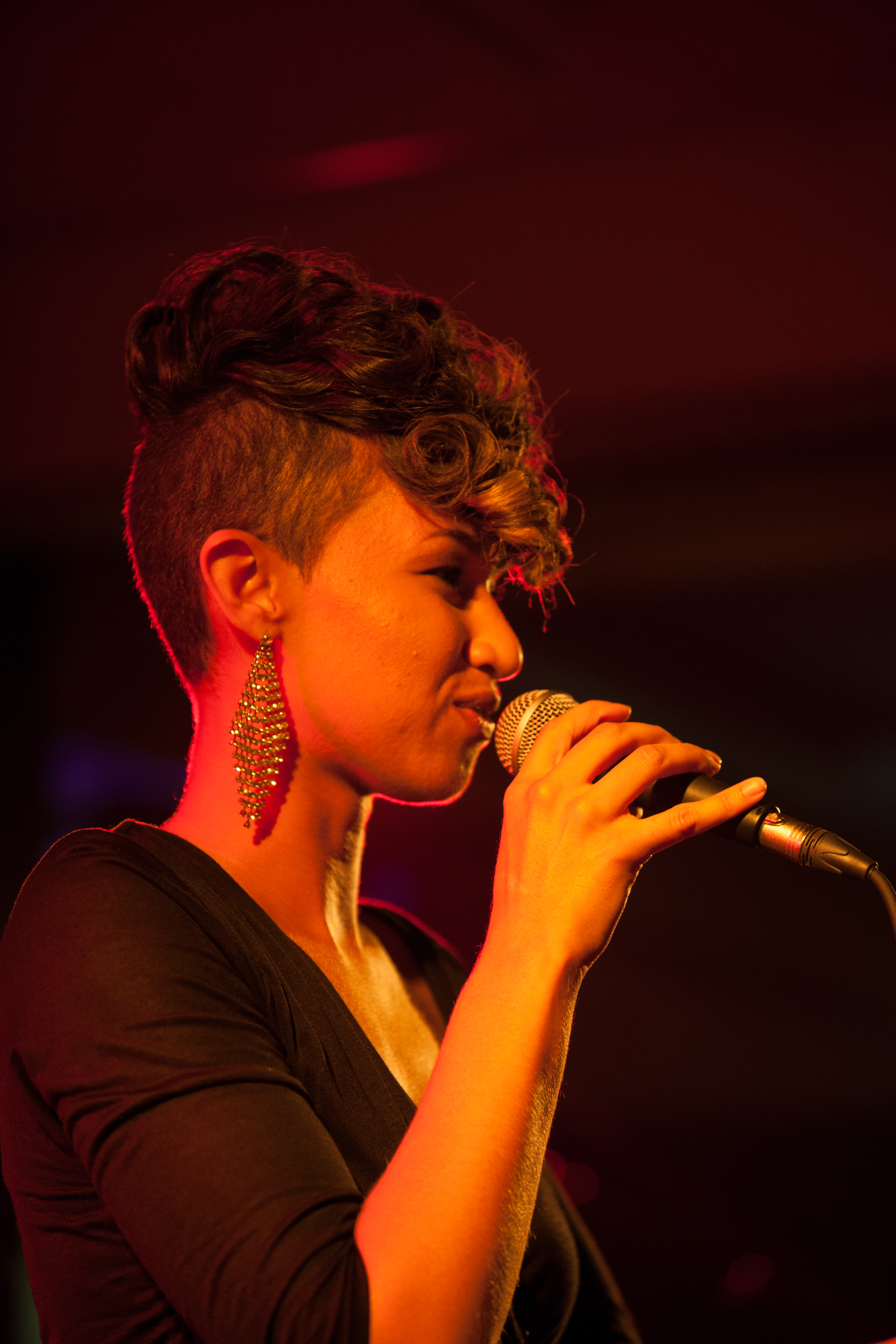
- Performing at the Montreux Jazz Festival

Background information
- Also known as: Butterscotch
- Born: Antoinette Clinton; September 29, 1985 (age 40); Sacramento, California, United States
- Origin: Davis, California, U.S.
- Genres: R&B, hip hop, jazz
- Occupations: Singer
- Instruments: Vocals, piano, guitar
- Years active: 2003–present

Antoinette Clinton (born September 29, 1985), known professionally as Butterscotch, is an American beatboxer, singer, and musician.

== Early life and education ==
Butterscotch learned to play the piano at an early age as her mother was a piano teacher. Her siblings all played the piano plus one other instrument: trumpet, cello, trombone, or clarinet. Clinton had access to all these instruments. As Butterscotch grew older, she was exposed to beat boxing by her high school friends, and was inspired to learn the skill, adopting the stage name "Butterscotch" which originated from a song Antoinette wrote in high school. She attended Natomas Charter School's Performing and Fine Arts Academy in Sacramento, California, where she focused on music.

== America's Got Talent ==
Butterscotch gained national exposure in 2007 when she appeared on the second season of America's Got Talent. She both sang and beatboxed, as well as a combination of the two while playing the piano, for her performances. The judges passed Butterscotch through several episodes and she was voted back by the viewers several times. She was in the final four (the last stage of the competition before the winner is announced), before being voted out by the viewers on the show which aired August 20, 2007. A number of videos with Butterscotch have gained wide popularity on YouTube.

=== Performances/results ===
Week	Theme	Song choice	Original artist	Result
Audition	Chicago	"Love to Love You Baby"	Donna Summer	Advanced
Vegas Verdicts	N/A	N/A	N/A	Advanced
Top 20; Group 1	N/A	"Summertime"	Abbie Mitchell	Advanced
Top 10	N/A	"It's Your Thing"	The Isley Brothers	Advanced
Top 8	Heroes	"My Funny Valentine"	Mitzi Green	Advanced
Top 4	Judges' Choice; Contestant's Choice	"What's Going On" "Dance to the Music"	Marvin Gaye; Sly & the Family Stone	N/A
Finale	Duets	"Beautiful Girls"	Sean Kingston	3rd Place
