= Julienne Irwin =

American singer-songwriter

- Born: March 14, 1993 (age 33)
- Origin: Bel Air, Maryland, U.S.
- Genres: Country, pop
- Occupations: Flight attendant, singer
- Years active: 2007–present
- Website: www.julienneirwin.com

Julienne Irwin (born March 14, 1993) is an American singer from Bel Air, Maryland, United States. She rose to national attention as a finalist on the second season of America's Got Talent in 2007.

== Early life ==
Irwin was raised in Bel Air, Maryland. Prior to her America's Got Talent debut, she had never performed publicly or received vocal lessons. According to her biography on the NBC website, she attended Harford Christian School, where she was a cheerleader and served as class president. A devoted country music fan, Irwin described the genre on her official website as a constant presence in her daily life, and she has also spoken about the importance of her education in shaping who she is. One of her stated ambitions was to sing the national anthem at Camden Yards, home of the Baltimore Orioles.

== America's Got Talent (2007) ==
The second season of America's Got Talent featured a nationwide search among thousands of applicants competing for a one million dollar prize. Irwin auditioned in New York with an a cappella rendition of "How Do I Live" (LeAnn Rimes), written by Diane Warren. The judges unanimously praised her raw talent and advanced her to the Las Vegas callbacks.

Irwin advanced through the competition with the following performances:

- Las Vegas callbacks: "At Last" (Etta James), by Mack Gordon and Harry Warren (shown briefly in a montage)
- Semifinals: "Bless the Broken Road" (Rascal Flatts), by Bobby Boyd, Jeff Hanna and Marcus Hummon
- Top ten: "Til I Can Make It On My Own", by Tammy Wynette, George Richey and Billy Sherill
- Final eight: "Crazy" (Patsy Cline), by Willie Nelson

Irwin reached the top four, and on August 14 performed two songs: "What Hurts the Most" (Rascal Flatts), by Jeffrey Steele and Steve Robson, chosen for her by the judges, and "Over The Rainbow", by Harold Arlen and E.Y. Harburg, as her own choice. Judge Piers Morgan responded that although he doubted she had done enough to win, he considered it a brilliant performance.

In the season finale, Irwin performed "Teardrops on My Guitar" as a duet with country singer-songwriter Taylor Swift. Asked what advice she would offer Irwin, Swift praised her humility and endearing personality and encouraged her to stay true to herself. The broadcast also included a prerecorded message from four-time CMA and three-time ACM Female Vocalist of the Year Martina McBride, who complimented Irwin's voice and said watching her recalled memories of her own singing at that age.

Irwin was the first of the final four contestants to be eliminated.

== Career ==
On September 9, 2007, Irwin fulfilled her ambition of singing the national anthem at Camden Yards. The Baltimore Sun reported that while she appeared awe-struck before the game — including after a brief conversation with Orioles player Melvin Mora — her performance itself showed professional poise and clarity, though she later admitted to being nervous. That same week, she began her freshman year at Harford Christian School in Darlington.

On September 23, 2007, Irwin sang the national anthem before a crowd of 140,000 spectators at the Dodge Dealers 400 at Dover International Speedway, televised nationally on ABC.

In December 2007, Irwin toured with Kenny Rogers, finishing on December 23; she later expressed her gratitude to Rogers for the opportunity. She has traveled across the country performing her original music and opening for artists including Tracy Lawrence, Ronnie Dunn, and Uncle Kracker.

In March 2008, around her 15th birthday, Irwin entered a recording studio for the first time to record demos — four original songs written for her, along with full versions of "Somewhere Over the Rainbow" and "Fields of Gold". The demo recordings were later made available online.

Irwin graduated from Bel Air High School in Bel Air, Maryland, and is an alumna of Belmont University in Nashville, Tennessee, class of 2015. In 2010, she worked with Nashville producer David Malloy and continued to pursue songwriting. Her website, www.julienneirwin.com, includes a blog, and she maintains a presence on Facebook and Twitter.
