= 2007 Ford 400 =

Race details
- Race 36 of 36 in the 2007 NASCAR Nextel Cup Series season
- Homestead-Miami Speedway
- Date: November 18, 2007
- Location: Homestead-Miami Speedway, Homestead, Florida
- Course: Permanent racing facility
- Course length: 1.5 miles (2.4 km)
- Distance: 267 laps, 400.5 mi (644.542 km)
- Weather: Temperatures reaching up to 79.5 °F (26.4 °C); wind speeds up to 11.1 miles per hour (17.9 km/h)
- Average speed: 131.888 miles per hour (212.253 km/h)

Pole position
Driver	Jimmie Johnson	Hendrick Motorsports
- Time: 30.545

Most laps led
Driver	Matt Kenseth	Roush Fenway Racing
- Laps: 214

Winner
No. 17	Matt Kenseth	Roush Fenway Racing

Television in the United States
- Network: ABC
- Announcers: Jerry Punch, Rusty Wallace, and Andy Petree

The 2007 Ford 400 was a NASCAR Nextel Cup Series stock car race that was held on November 18, 2007 at Homestead-Miami Speedway in Homestead, Florida. The 267-lap race was the thirty-sixth in the 2007 NASCAR Nextel Cup Series, as well as the final race in the ten-race Chase for the Nextel Cup, which ended the season.

The race was historic for several reasons:

- The race was the last to use the current template for NASCAR's premier series, based on the 1966 Ford Fairlane run by the Holman-Moody Racing team. Starting in 2008, NASCAR used the Car of Tomorrow template full-time, one year ahead of the originally planned schedule. Those cars became standard in the Nationwide Series February 2009.
- The series ran under the "Nextel Cup" banner for the last time. Starting in 2008, as per the merger of Sprint Nextel, the series changed to the "NASCAR Sprint Cup.”
- The season-long championship was decided after the completion of this race. After the Checker Auto Parts 500, Jimmie Johnson led Jeff Gordon by 86 points, with both drivers eligible to clinch the season championship. It would be Rick Hendrick's seventh championship. Johnson needed to finish better than 18th (without leading a lap), 19th (leading a lap) or 21st (leading the most laps) to clinch his second consecutive championship.
- The race also marked the last appearance of the No. 25 Hendrick Motorsports car (except the 2011 NASCAR Sprint All-Star Race). Since making its debut in the 1986 Daytona 500, the car had been raced by eleven drivers in 656 races, winning seventeen. Its most recent win was by Casey Mears in the 2007 Coca-Cola 600. The points for this car transferred over to the new No. 88 Dale Earnhardt Jr. ride for 2008. The current No. 88, piloted by Ricky Rudd, who retired after this race, and owned by Yates Racing, became the No. 28 again in 2008 with Travis Kvapil in the drivers' seat. While Dale Jarrett was in the seat, they won the 1999 Cup championship (then under Winston sponsorship).
- The three-way battle for the 35th spot in owners points also concluded here. Holding down that 35th spot was the No. 22 Toyota of Bill Davis Racing, driven by Dave Blaney. Behind them by 136 points was the No. 21 Ford of Wood Brothers/JTG Racing, driven by Bill Elliott. Ahead of the No. 22 was the No. 45 Dodge of Petty Enterprises, driven by Kyle Petty, but they were only ahead by 29 points. At the conclusion of this race, the teams that held the 35th spot was guaranteed a starting position in the first five races of 2008, including the 2008 Daytona 500.

== Pre-race news ==
- Todd Bodine drove the No. 4 Morgan-McClure Motorsports ride, replacing Ward Burton, but failed to qualify, thus ending their 2007 season. Johnny Benson put the No. 36 Bill Davis Racing 360 OTC Toyota Camry into the race.

== Qualifying ==
With a lap of 30.545 seconds at a speed of 176.788 mph (284.513 km/h), points leader Jimmie Johnson moved one step closer to winning his second consecutive championship by winning the final pole award under Anheuser-Busch sponsorship. Johnson's main rival, teammate Jeff Gordon, started 11th, two-time Homestead winner Tony Stewart started 14th, and defending three-time winner Greg Biffle started 37th.

Failed to qualify: A. J. Allmendinger (84), John Andretti (49), Joe Nemechek (78), Michael Waltrip (55), Todd Bodine (4), Burney Lamar (08, crashed in qualifying).

== Race ==
Matt Kenseth won the race, celebrating by doing burnouts with his race car. Jimmie Johnson finished seventh, and won the 2007 Nextel Cup championship by 77 points over Jeff Gordon, and also did burnouts with Kenseth.

== Notes ==
- This was the last race for Joe Gibbs Racing using the Chevrolet, from 2008 onwards, they switched to Toyota.

Previous race: 2007 Checker Auto Parts 500	Nextel Cup Series; 2007 season	Next race: 2008 Daytona 500
