= 2016 Daytona 500 =

Overview of the auto race

Race details
- Race 1 of 36 in the 2016 NASCAR Sprint Cup Series
- Date: February 21, 2016
- Location: Daytona International Speedway in Daytona Beach, Florida
- Course: Permanent racing facility 2.5 mi (4 km)
- Distance: 200 laps, 500 mi (800 km)
- Weather: Mostly sunny skies with a temperature of 74 °F (23 °C); wind out of the east/southeast at 5 mph (8.0 km/h)
- Average speed: 157.549 mph (253.551 km/h)

Pole position
Driver	Chase Elliott (R)	Hendrick Motorsports
- Time: 45.845

Qualifying race winners
Duel 1 Winner	Dale Earnhardt Jr.	Hendrick Motorsports
Duel 2 Winner	Kyle Busch	Joe Gibbs Racing

Most laps led
Driver	Denny Hamlin	Joe Gibbs Racing
- Laps: 95

Winner
No. 11	Denny Hamlin	Joe Gibbs Racing

Television in the United States
- Network: Fox
- Announcers: Mike Joy, Jeff Gordon and Darrell Waltrip
- Nielsen ratings: 6.1/11 (Overnight); 6.6/12 (Final); 11.4 million viewers

Radio in the United States
- Radio: MRN
- Booth announcers: Joe Moore, Jeff Striegle and Rusty Wallace
- Turn announcers: Dave Moody (1 & 2), Mike Bagley (Backstretch) and Kyle Rickey (3 & 4)

The 2016 Daytona 500, the 58th running of the event, was a NASCAR Sprint Cup Series race held on February 21, 2016, at Daytona International Speedway in Daytona Beach, Florida. Contested over 200 laps on the 2.5-mile (4.0 km) asphalt superspeedway, it was the first race of the 2016 NASCAR Sprint Cup Series season. Denny Hamlin won the race in a photo finish over Martin Truex Jr. The top-five was rounded out by Kyle Busch, Kevin Harvick and Carl Edwards.

Chase Elliott won the pole for the race and led three laps before crashing out early in the race and finished 37th. Dale Earnhardt Jr., and Kyle Busch won the Duel races. Unlike Busch, Earnhardt Jr. crashed out with 29 laps to go and finished 36th.

Hamlin led a race-high of 95 laps on his way to winning the race. There were six caution flag periods for 31 laps and 20 lead changes among 15 different drivers. It was a largely clean race that did not result in the Big One happening, nor did it result in a last-lap accident, a relatively rare occurrence for superspeedway races to not feature such in that era.

This was the 27th career victory for Hamlin, first of the season, first at Daytona International Speedway and fifth win at the track for Joe Gibbs Racing. He left Daytona Beach with a five-point lead over Truex Jr. Toyota left with an eight-point lead over Chevrolet in the manufacturer standings.

The Daytona 500 was carried by Fox Sports on the broadcast Fox network for the American television audience. The radio broadcast for the race was carried by the Motor Racing Network and Sirius XM NASCAR Radio.

This event featured guest star WWE wrestler John Cena as a pace car driver.

This was the first Daytona 500 since 1992 and 1998 not featuring 3-time Daytona 500 winner Jeff Gordon and Tony Stewart on the starting grid. Gordon retired at the end of 2015 and called the 2016 race from the commentators to stand, and Stewart injured his back while riding a dune buggy outside San Diego. Also, this was the last Daytona 500 starts for Bobby Labonte, Robert Richardson Jr., Michael Annett, Brian Vickers, HScott Motorsports, and Carl Edwards.

== Report ==
=== Background ===
Daytona International Speedway, the track where the race was held, the photo above taken a year prior.

Daytona International Speedway is a race track in Daytona Beach, Florida, that is one of six superspeedways to hold NASCAR races, the others being Auto Club Speedway, Indianapolis Motor Speedway, Michigan International Speedway, Pocono Raceway and Talladega Superspeedway. The standard track at Daytona is a four-turn superspeedway that is 2.5 miles (4.0 km) long. The track also features two other layouts that utilize portions of the primary high speed tri-oval, such as a 3.56-mile (5.73 km) sports car course and a 2.95-mile (4.75 km) motorcycle course. The track's 180-acre (73 ha) infield includes the 29-acre (12 ha) Lake Lloyd, which has hosted powerboat racing. The speedway is owned and operated by International Speedway Corporation.

The track was built to host racing that was being held by NASCAR founder Bill France Sr. at the former Daytona Beach Road Course and opened with the first Daytona 500 in 1959. The speedway has been renovated three times, with the infield renovated in 2004, and the track repaved in 1978 and 2010.

The Daytona 500 is regarded as the most important and prestigious race on the NASCAR calendar. It is also the series' first race of the year; this phenomenon is virtually unique in sports, which tend to have championships or other major events at the end of the season rather than the start. Since 1995, U.S. television ratings for the Daytona 500 have been the highest for any auto race of the year, surpassing the traditional leader, the Indianapolis 500 which in turn greatly surpasses the Daytona 500 in in-track attendance and international viewing. The 2006 Daytona 500 attracted the sixth largest average live global TV audience of any sporting event that year with 20 million viewers.

=== Changes ===
==== Restrictor plate ====
For the events of Speedweeks, the size of the holes in the restrictor plates was reduced from 29/32nd of an inch to 57/64th of an inch.

==== Race procedure ====
Changes were made to the green-white-checker procedure for this race and all races in 2016 with an "overtime line". The location of this line will vary from track to track, but it'll be located near the middle of the backstretch at most tracks. If the leader passes the line before a caution comes out, the race will end under caution. If a caution comes out before the leader passes the line, the field will be reset to their original spots and another restart will be attempted until a "clean restart" is achieved. These changes are in response to the botched final restart attempt in last October's 2015 CampingWorld.com 500 at Talladega at Talladega Superspeedway.

== Entry list ==
The entry list for the Daytona 500 was released on Friday, February 12, at 12:05 p.m. Eastern time. Forty-four cars were entered for the race.

Following the 2015 Ford EcoBoost 400 at Homestead-Miami Speedway, a number of drivers attempted to run for a different team than they did in 2015. Chase Elliott, 2014 NASCAR Xfinity Series champion and son of 1988 Cup Series champion Bill Elliott, took over the No. 24 Hendrick Motorsports Chevrolet from the retired Jeff Gordon. Clint Bowyer took over the No. 15 (renumbered from No. 51) from Justin Allgaier. Brian Scott took over the No. 44 (renumbered from No. 9) from Sam Hornish Jr. Chris Buescher, reigning Xfinity Series champion, took over the No. 34 from Brett Moffitt and various of drivers. Landon Cassill took over the No. 38 from David Gilliland. David Ragan took over the No. 23 from Jeb Burton, and J. J. Yeley. Regan Smith took over the No. 7 from Alex Bowman. Brian Vickers drove the No. 14 in place of the injured Tony Stewart.

No.	Driver	Team	Manufacturer
1	Jamie McMurray (W)	Chip Ganassi Racing	Chevrolet
2	Brad Keselowski	Team Penske	Ford
3	Austin Dillon	Richard Childress Racing	Chevrolet
4	Kevin Harvick (W)	Stewart–Haas Racing	Chevrolet
5	Kasey Kahne	Hendrick Motorsports	Chevrolet
6	Trevor Bayne (W)	Roush Fenway Racing	Ford
7	Regan Smith	Tommy Baldwin Racing	Chevrolet
10	Danica Patrick	Stewart–Haas Racing	Chevrolet
11	Denny Hamlin	Joe Gibbs Racing	Toyota
13	Casey Mears	Germain Racing	Chevrolet
14	Brian Vickers	Stewart–Haas Racing	Chevrolet
15	Clint Bowyer	HScott Motorsports	Chevrolet
16	Greg Biffle	Roush Fenway Racing	Ford
17	Ricky Stenhouse Jr.	Roush Fenway Racing	Ford
18	Kyle Busch	Joe Gibbs Racing	Toyota
19	Carl Edwards	Joe Gibbs Racing	Toyota
20	Matt Kenseth (W)	Joe Gibbs Racing	Toyota
21	Ryan Blaney (R)	Wood Brothers Racing	Ford
22	Joey Logano (W)	Team Penske	Ford
23	David Ragan	BK Racing	Toyota
24	Chase Elliott (R)	Hendrick Motorsports	Chevrolet
26	Robert Richardson Jr.	BK Racing	Toyota
27	Paul Menard	Richard Childress Racing	Chevrolet
30	Josh Wise	The Motorsports Group	Chevrolet
31	Ryan Newman (W)	Richard Childress Racing	Chevrolet
32	Bobby Labonte	Go FAS Racing	Ford
34	Chris Buescher (R)	Front Row Motorsports	Ford
35	David Gilliland	Front Row Motorsports	Ford
38	Landon Cassill	Front Row Motorsports	Ford
40	Reed Sorenson	Hillman Racing	Chevrolet
41	Kurt Busch	Stewart–Haas Racing	Chevrolet
42	Kyle Larson	Chip Ganassi Racing	Chevrolet
43	Aric Almirola	Richard Petty Motorsports	Ford
44	Brian Scott (R)	Richard Petty Motorsports	Ford
46	Michael Annett	HScott Motorsports	Chevrolet
47	A. J. Allmendinger	JTG Daugherty Racing	Chevrolet
48	Jimmie Johnson (W)	Hendrick Motorsports	Chevrolet
59	Michael McDowell	Circle Sport – Leavine Family Racing	Chevrolet
78	Martin Truex Jr.	Furniture Row Racing	Toyota
83	Michael Waltrip (W)	BK Racing	Toyota
88	Dale Earnhardt Jr. (W)	Hendrick Motorsports	Chevrolet
93	Matt DiBenedetto	BK Racing	Toyota
95	Ty Dillon (i)	Circle Sport – Leavine Family Racing	Chevrolet
98	Cole Whitt	Premium Motorsports	Toyota
Official initial entry list
Official final entry list

== Practice ==
=== First practice (February 13) ===
Dale Earnhardt Jr. was the fastest in the first practice session with a time of 46.364 seconds and a speed of 194.116 mph (312.399 km/h).

Pos	No.	Driver	Team	Manufacturer	Time	Speed
1	88	Dale Earnhardt Jr.	Hendrick Motorsports	Chevrolet	46.364	194.116
2	22	Joey Logano	Team Penske	Ford	46.427	193.853
3	20	Matt Kenseth	Joe Gibbs Racing	Toyota	46.444	193.782
Official first practice results

=== Second practice (February 13) ===
Joey Logano was the fastest in the second practice session with a time of 45.934 seconds and a speed of 195.933 mph (315.324 km/h).

Pos	No.	Driver	Team	Manufacturer	Time	Speed
1	22	Joey Logano	Team Penske	Ford	45.934	195.933
2	2	Brad Keselowski	Team Penske	Ford	45.954	195.848
3	21	Ryan Blaney (R)	Wood Brothers Racing	Ford	45.966	195.797
Official second practice results

== Qualifying ==
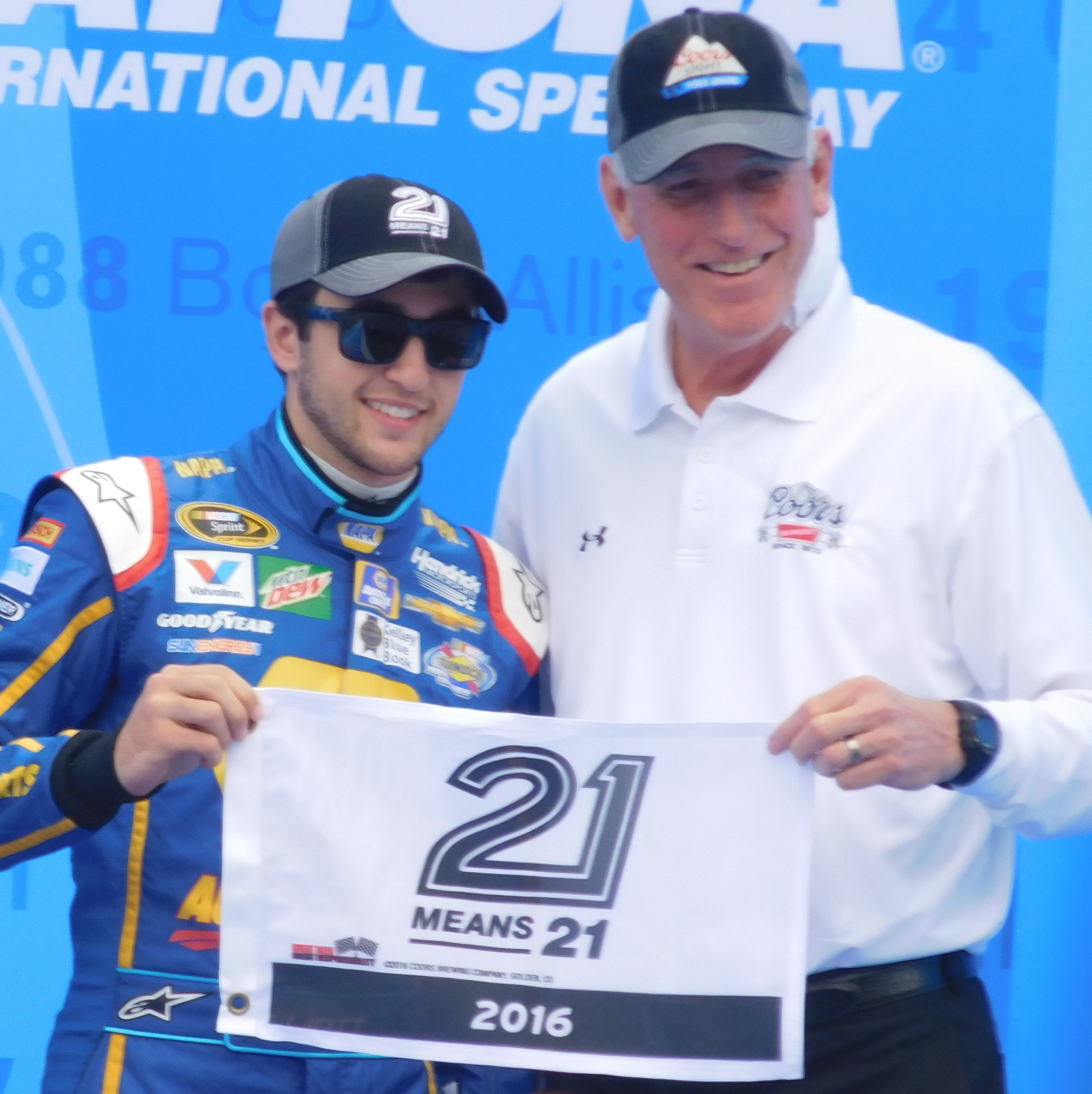
Chase Elliott scored the pole for the Daytona 500.

Qualifying for the Daytona 500 is different from any other race weekend because the starting lineup for the race – except for the two drivers that post the two fastest timed laps in the final round of qualifying – isn't set on qualifying day. It sets the lineup for the two duel races the following Thursday.

Unlike qualifying at non-restrictor plate races, qualifying at Daytona International Speedway and Talladega Superspeedway consists of two rounds of cars being sent out one at a time to make a single timed lap. The fastest 12 advance to the final round to run for the pole position.

Chase Elliott scored the pole for the race with a time of 45.845 and a speed of 196.314 mph (315.937 km/h). Elliott became the 6th rookie to win the pole for the Daytona 500 joining Loy Allen Jr. (1994), Jimmie Johnson (2002), David Gilliland (2007), Danica Patrick (2013), and Austin Dillon (2014). He said that today was "a very, very cool day. I don’t know that this opportunity has sunk in yet, much less sitting on the pole for the Daytona 500. I think the big thing is just the team and the Daytona 500 qualifying is about the team guys and the effort they put into these cars and it’s nothing special I did, it’s really what kind of work they did this off-season to make it happen."

After qualifying seventh and being all but guaranteed into the Daytona 500 based on speed, Ryan Blaney said that he "wasn't really too nervous going into today. I knew we had a really fast race car. We just had to do our job and we did it and we just had to lock ourselves in. I really wasn't feeling any different than I do any other day."

Likewise, Matt DiBenedetto – who was also all but guaranteed in on his speed after qualifying 24th – said that he could "sleep well, finally. I was really nervous all night. This is just a testament to the hard work from the guys on my team. Two-hundredths of a second. I'm really thankful, thankful to be racing in my first Daytona 500, most importantly. I'm really thankful and blessed to be here."

Martin Truex Jr. was unable to post a time over a roof flap issue. The Stewart Haas Racing cars of Kevin Harvick and Brian Vickers had their times disqualified after their track bars failed inspection.

=== Qualifying results ===
Pos	No.	Driver	Team	Manufacturer	R(1)	R(2)
1	24	Chase Elliott (R)	Hendrick Motorsports	Chevrolet	46.031	45.845
2	20	Matt Kenseth	Joe Gibbs Racing	Toyota	45.994	45.910
3	88	Dale Earnhardt Jr.	Hendrick Motorsports	Chevrolet	45.968	45.993
4	18	Kyle Busch	Joe Gibbs Racing	Toyota	46.127	46.105
5	17	Ricky Stenhouse Jr.	Roush Fenway Racing	Ford	46.191	46.126
6	48	Jimmie Johnson	Hendrick Motorsports	Chevrolet	46.215	46.192
7	21	Ryan Blaney (R)	Wood Brothers Racing	Ford	46.257	46.214
8	3	Austin Dillon	Richard Childress Racing	Chevrolet	46.201	46.231
9	19	Carl Edwards	Joe Gibbs Racing	Toyota	46.269	46.234
10	11	Denny Hamlin	Joe Gibbs Racing	Toyota	46.266	46.267
11	41	Kurt Busch	Stewart–Haas Racing	Chevrolet	46.330	46.270
12	22	Joey Logano	Team Penske	Ford	46.331	46.282
13	13	Casey Mears	Germain Racing	Chevrolet	46.332	—
14	5	Kasey Kahne	Hendrick Motorsports	Chevrolet	46.367	—
15	31	Ryan Newman	Richard Childress Racing	Chevrolet	46.368	—
16	27	Paul Menard	Richard Childress Racing	Chevrolet	46.407	—
17	95	Ty Dillon (i)	Circle Sport – Leavine Family Racing	Chevrolet	46.407	—
18	2	Brad Keselowski	Team Penske	Ford	46.421	—
19	43	Aric Almirola	Richard Petty Motorsports	Ford	46.451	—
20	16	Greg Biffle	Roush Fenway Racing	Ford	46.472	—
21	1	Jamie McMurray	Chip Ganassi Racing	Chevrolet	46.536	—
22	44	Brian Scott (R)	Richard Petty Motorsports	Ford	46.552	—
23	42	Kyle Larson	Chip Ganassi Racing	Chevrolet	46.647	—
24	93	Matt DiBenedetto	BK Racing	Toyota	46.708	—
25	59	Michael McDowell	Circle Sport – Leavine Family Racing	Chevrolet	46.728	—
26	7	Regan Smith	Tommy Baldwin Racing	Chevrolet	46.743	—
27	83	Michael Waltrip	BK Racing	Toyota	46.776	—
28	34	Chris Buescher (R)	Front Row Motorsports	Ford	46.786	—
29	10	Danica Patrick	Stewart–Haas Racing	Chevrolet	46.804	—
30	32	Bobby Labonte	Go FAS Racing	Ford	46.922	—
31	47	A. J. Allmendinger	JTG Daugherty Racing	Chevrolet	46.977	—
32	6	Trevor Bayne	Roush Fenway Racing	Ford	47.013	—
33	46	Michael Annett	HScott Motorsports	Chevrolet	47.046	—
34	15	Clint Bowyer	HScott Motorsports	Chevrolet	47.059	—
35	38	Landon Cassill	Front Row Motorsports	Ford	47.073	—
36	26	Robert Richardson Jr.	BK Racing	Toyota	47.245	—
37	98	Cole Whitt	Premium Motorsports	Toyota	47.275	—
38	35	David Gilliland	Front Row Motorsports	Ford	47.531	—
39	23	David Ragan	BK Racing	Toyota	47.602	—
40	30	Josh Wise	The Motorsports Group	Chevrolet	48.056	—
41	40	Reed Sorenson	Hillman Racing	Chevrolet	49.679	—
42	14	Brian Vickers	Stewart–Haas Racing	Chevrolet	0.000	-
43	4	Kevin Harvick	Stewart–Haas Racing	Chevrolet	0.000	-
44	78	Martin Truex Jr.	Furniture Row Racing	Toyota	0.000	-
Official qualifying results

Key	Meaning
(1)	Round 1
(2)	Round 2

== Practice (post-qualifying) ==
=== Third practice (February 17) ===
Michael McDowell was the fastest in the third practice session with a time of 44.961 and a speed of 200.173 mph (322.147 km/h).

Pos	No.	Driver	Team	Manufacturer	Time	Speed
1	59	Michael McDowell	Circle Sport – Leavine Family Racing	Chevrolet	44.961	200.173
2	6	Trevor Bayne	Roush Fenway Racing	Ford	45.019	199.916
3	16	Greg Biffle	Roush Fenway Racing	Ford	45.086	199.619
Official third practice results

=== Fourth practice (February 17) ===
Brian Scott was the fastest in the fourth practice session with a time of 45.045 and a speed of 199.800 mph (321.547 km/h). Kyle Larson and Michael Waltrip will start from the rear of the field in their respective Duel races after being involved in a four-car crash in turn 1.

Pos	No.	Driver	Team	Manufacturer	Time	Speed
1	44	Brian Scott (R)	Richard Petty Motorsports	Ford	45.045	199.800
2	3	Austin Dillon	Richard Childress Racing	Chevrolet	45.052	199.762
3	18	Kyle Busch	Joe Gibbs Racing	Toyota	45.061	199.729
Official fourth practice results

=== Fifth practice (February 18) ===
Jimmie Johnson was the fastest in the fifth practice session with a time of 46.619 and a speed of 193.054 mph (310.690 km/h).

Pos	No.	Driver	Team	Manufacturer	Time	Speed
1	48	Jimmie Johnson	Hendrick Motorsports	Chevrolet	46.619	193.054
2	44	Brian Scott (R)	Richard Petty Motorsports	Ford	47.394	189.897
3	43	Aric Almirola	Richard Petty Motorsports	Ford	47.394	189.897
Official fifth practice results

== Can-Am Duel ==
The Can-Am Duels are a pair of NASCAR Sprint Cup Series races held in conjunction with the Daytona 500 annually in February at Daytona International Speedway. They consist of two races 60 laps and 150 miles (240 km) in length, which serve as heat races that set the lineup for the Daytona 500. The first race sets the lineup for cars that qualified in odd-numbered positions on pole qualifying day, while the second race sets the lineup for cars that qualified in even-numbered positions. The procedure for qualifying changed from the 2015 edition - the Duels now set the lineup for positions 3–38, while positions 39 and 40 are filled by the two "Open" (teams without a charter) cars that set the fastest times in qualifying, but did not lock in a spot in the Duels.

=== Race 1 ===
Dale Earnhardt Jr. put on a clinic leading 43 of 60 laps on his way to scoring his fifth Can-Am Duel race victory. He said that it was "real special. I try not to make too big a deal, but I was thinking about that. I'm guilty of daydreaming a bit about winning this race tonight because of the date. That's very special to me, and I was glad that nothing bad happened, we didn't tear our car up, because that would have been embarrassing on a day like this." Michael McDowell raced his way into the Daytona 500 while Cole Whitt failed to make the race. He said that there was indeed "a lot going on in the off-season. Obviously there was a lot of unknowns with the charter, what was going to happen with that. There was a time where we felt like we were going to be in a tough spot, you know, that we weren't sure if we were going to be able to compete this year at all, whether an open car or charter car. Luckily we were able to put together the partnership with RCR, that alliance. Switching over to Chevy helped strengthen our position there. With Thrivent Financial and KLOVE and all our partners coming onboard, all our sponsors coming onboard, really partnering with Joe Falk at Circle Sport, allowed us to say...”

=== Race 2 ===
Kyle Busch led 35 of 60 laps to score his third career Can-Am Duel win. He joked that his "plan was just to have everybody stay single-file and we take the checkered flag, but they didn’t see things the way I did." The race ended under caution after a multi-car wreck on the final lap in turn 1 that collected Jimmie Johnson, Matt Kenseth and Martin Truex Jr. Jamie McMurray said he "was trying to block the 48 (Jimmie Johnson). I had stalled out right when I got to the 18 car (Kyle Busch), and I didn’t think the 48 had much of a run either. It felt like our momentum was about the same. I saw the replay and I still don’t know if he was up to my rear bumper or if it was the air that made his car turn. I’m just not sure.” Johnson said that McMurray "was trying to get underneath the 18 and that didn’t work out, and I creeped up to his outside. He moved up quickly to defend that. I could tell I was going to be taken up into the wall. I tried getting out of there but kind of got into the fence, skipped off the wall and spun out in front of everybody. It was a lot gone wrong, I guess. It’s not like anything was intentional. It’s just a bummer to tear up a car after taking the white flag in a car that we tried so hard to protect and make so fast. There was just a lot gone wrong.” Robert Richardson Jr. transferred into the Daytona 500 while David Gilliland and Reed Sorenson failed to make the race. He said that he was "very, very honored to be a part of BK Racing, having another opportunity to run here at the Daytona 500. I’ve been in it once before, but this one is very, very special to me. My wife and I welcomed our brand-new baby boy who was born in early December. Every bit of earnings we get from this race is going to go into a college fund for him. It’s just the good Lord looking down on us and blessing us. Got to give all the glory to Him.”

=== Starting lineup ===
Pos	No.	Driver	Team	Manufacturer	Notes
1	24	Chase Elliott (R)	Hendrick Motorsports	Chevrolet	Fastest in pole qualifying
2	20	Matt Kenseth (Note: Matt Kenseth, Jimmie Johnson, Martin Truex Jr., A. J. Allmendinger and Brian Scott started from the rear of the field after going to a backup car post-qualifying.)	Joe Gibbs Racing	Toyota	Second fastest in pole qualifying
3	88	Dale Earnhardt Jr.	Hendrick Motorsports	Chevrolet	Duel race #1 winner
4	18	Kyle Busch	Joe Gibbs Racing	Toyota	Duel race #2 winner
5	22	Joey Logano	Team Penske	Ford	Second in Duel 1
6	1	Jamie McMurray	Chip Ganassi Racing	Chevrolet	Second in Duel 2
7	21	Ryan Blaney (R)	Wood Brothers Racing	Ford	Third in Duel 1
8	41	Kurt Busch	Stewart–Haas Racing	Chevrolet	Third in Duel 2
9	4	Kevin Harvick	Stewart–Haas Racing	Chevrolet	Fourth in Duel 1
10	19	Carl Edwards	Joe Gibbs Racing	Toyota	Fourth in Duel 2
11	11	Denny Hamlin	Joe Gibbs Racing	Toyota	Fifth in Duel 1
12	95	Ty Dillon (i)	Circle Sport – Leavine Family Racing	Chevrolet	Fifth in Duel 2
13	5	Kasey Kahne	Hendrick Motorsports	Chevrolet	Seventh in Duel 1
14	42	Kyle Larson	Chip Ganassi Racing	Chevrolet	Sixth in Duel 2
15	16	Greg Biffle	Roush Fenway Racing	Ford	Eighth in Duel 1
16	10	Danica Patrick	Stewart–Haas Racing	Chevrolet	Seventh in Duel 2
17	34	Chris Buescher (R)	Front Row Motorsports	Ford	Ninth in Duel 1
18	14	Brian Vickers	Stewart–Haas Racing	Chevrolet	Eighth in Duel 2
19	17	Ricky Stenhouse Jr.	Roush Fenway Racing	Ford	10th in Duel 1
20	93	Matt DiBenedetto	BK Racing	Toyota	Ninth in Duel 2
21	3	Austin Dillon	Richard Childress Racing	Chevrolet	11th in Duel 1
22	46	Michael Annett	HScott Motorsports	Chevrolet	10th in Duel 2
23	6	Trevor Bayne	Roush Fenway Racing	Ford	12th in Duel 1
24	38	Landon Cassill	Front Row Motorsports	Ford	11th in Duel 2
25	2	Brad Keselowski	Team Penske	Ford	13th in Duel 1
26	48	Jimmie Johnson	Hendrick Motorsports	Chevrolet	13th in Duel 2
27	7	Regan Smith	Tommy Baldwin Racing	Chevrolet	15th in Duel 1
28	78	Martin Truex Jr.	Furniture Row Racing	Toyota	14th in Duel 2
29	23	David Ragan	BK Racing	Toyota	16th in Duel 1
30	47	A. J. Allmendinger	JTG Daugherty Racing	Chevrolet	15th in Duel 2
31	15	Clint Bowyer	HScott Motorsports	Chevrolet	18th in Duel 1
32	13	Casey Mears	Germain Racing	Chevrolet	17th in Duel 2
33	32	Bobby Labonte	Go FAS Racing	Ford	19th in Duel 1
34	43	Aric Almirola	Richard Petty Motorsports	Ford	19th in Duel 2
35	44	Brian Scott (R)	Richard Petty Motorsports	Ford	20th in Duel 1
36	83	Michael Waltrip	BK Racing	Toyota	20th in Duel 2
37	27	Paul Menard	Richard Childress Racing	Chevrolet	21st in Duel 1
38	31	Ryan Newman	Richard Childress Racing	Chevrolet	22nd in Duel 2
39	59	Michael McDowell	Circle Sport – Leavine Family Racing	Chevrolet	Qualifying speed
40	26	Robert Richardson Jr.	BK Racing	Toyota	Qualifying speed
Did not qualify
41	35	David Gilliland	Front Row Motorsports	Ford	
42	30	Josh Wise	The Motorsports Group	Chevrolet	
43	40	Reed Sorenson	Hillman Racing	Chevrolet	
44	98	Cole Whitt	Premium Motorsports	Toyota	
Official starting lineup

== Practice (post-Duel) ==
=== Sixth practice (February 19) ===
Jimmie Johnson was the fastest in the sixth practice session with a time of 46.372 seconds and a speed of 194.083 mph (312.346 km/h).

Pos	No.	Driver	Team	Manufacturer	Time	Speed
1	48	Jimmie Johnson	Hendrick Motorsports	Chevrolet	46.372	194.083
2	11	Denny Hamlin	Joe Gibbs Racing	Toyota	46.425	193.861
3	24	Chase Elliott (R)	Hendrick Motorsports	Chevrolet	46.580	193.216
Official sixth practice results

=== Seventh practice (February 19) ===
Denny Hamlin was the fastest in the seventh practice session with a time of 45.077 seconds and a speed of 199.658 mph (321.318 km/h).

Pos	No.	Driver	Team	Manufacturer	Time	Speed
1	11	Denny Hamlin	Joe Gibbs Racing	Toyota	45.077	199.658
2	18	Kyle Busch	Joe Gibbs Racing	Toyota	45.308	198.640
3	78	Martin Truex Jr.	Furniture Row Racing	Toyota	45.308	198.640
Official seventh practice results

=== Final practice (February 20) ===
Dale Earnhardt Jr. was the fastest in the final practice session with a time of 45.655 seconds and a speed of 197.131 mph (317.252 km/h).

Pos	No.	Driver	Team	Manufacturer	Time	Speed
1	88	Dale Earnhardt Jr.	Hendrick Motorsports	Chevrolet	45.655	197.131
2	22	Joey Logano	Team Penske	Ford	45.832	196.369
3	21	Ryan Blaney (R)	Wood Brothers Racing	Ford	45.851	196.288
Official final practice results

== Race ==
=== First half ===
==== Start ====
Under clear Florida skies, Chase Elliott led the field to the green flag at 1:33 p.m. He and teammate Dale Earnhardt Jr. jumped ahead of Joey Logano to control the field. Earnhardt drove underneath teammate Elliott to take the lead on lap 5. He took to blocking the advance of Logano and Denny Hamlin to hold the lead. Kyle Busch dove underneath Earnhardt going into turn 3 to take the lead on lap 19. The first caution of the race flew the same lap for a two-car wreck on the front stretch. Exiting turn 4, Elliott got loose, came down across the nose of Carl Edwards, slid down into the grass and destroyed the front of his car. He said that he "got in middle there a couple of laps before and got loose off of (turn) four and just lost it. I hate it. It had been such a fun week and you hate to end the race before it even got started. Just disappointed for everybody. We will just have to look past it and get on for Atlanta. That is the most important thing now. Can't get caught up in what happened today, it is irrelevant now. We'll try and get it fixed and make some laps. Then its on to Atlanta and if we can make some laps we will and move forward from here." Regan Smith also got turned in the tri-oval. Hamlin exited pit road with the race lead. Michael Waltrip was tagged for his crew being over the wall too soon and restarted the race from the rear of the field.

The race restarted at lap 26. After five laps, Hamlin pulled ahead of Kurt Busch and held the lead unopposed. Jimmie Johnson tried to lead the outside line up towards the front, but it began losing steam and fell back. Eventually, the field jumped to the bottom and ran single-file. The second caution of the race flew on lap 57 for a multi-car wreck on the front stretch. Exiting turn 4, Brian Vickers got loose, overcorrected, spun up the track, spun back down the track and came to a rest at the entrance of pit road. Trying to avoid hitting Vickers, Edwards got turned into the wall by Trevor Bayne who was trying to avoid hitting him as well. Hamlin and Martin Truex Jr. swapped the lead on pit road. Johnson exited pit road with the lead after taking just right-side tires.

==== Second quarter ====
The race restarted on lap 62. Johnson and Hamlin ran side-by-side for a number of laps. Eventually, the outside line stalled out and Johnson pulled ahead. It started to regain momentum after Johnson jumped to the top. Kyle Busch drove underneath Johnson in turn 2 to take the lead on lap 79. The third caution of the race flew on lap 92 for a multi-car wreck in turn 2. The wreck involved Matt DiBenedetto and Chris Buescher, who slammed the wall. Buescher said it was "exponentially the hardest hit I’ve ever taken. It’s the first time I’ve ever had to be taken to the infield care center. That’s a bummer, but we’re fine.” DiBenedetto said he had "no excuse other than I messed up. It happens. We were clean last year, only involved in one accident in 35 races. I hate to start the year that way, but we’re going to be fine.” He would go on to finish 40th. Hamlin exited pit road with the race lead after taking just right-side tires. Michael Annett was tagged for his crew being over the wall too soon and restarted the race from the rear of the field.

=== Second half ===
==== Halfway ====
The race restarted on lap 100. The field started to form into three separate lines of racing. But just as quickly as it formed, it disappeared. Debris in turn 3 brought out the fourth caution of the race on lap 119. The debris came from Greg Biffle's car. Hamlin exited pit road with the race lead. Aric Almirola was tagged for an uncontrolled tire and restarted the race from the rear of the field.

The race restarted on lap 124. After making headway towards the front, the outside line fizzled out. It reformed and began moving back up towards the front. Denny Hamlin and the first five cars hit pit road to kick off a cycle of green flag stops. This handed the lead to Austin Dillon. He pitted the next lap and handed the lead to Brad Keselowski. He pitted the next lap and handed the lead to Annett. He pitted the next lap and the lead cycled to Kenseth. Johnson and Patrick were tagged for their crews being over the wall too soon and Waltrip was tagged for an uncontrolled tire. All three were forced to serve a pass-through penalty. Waltrip was black-flagged for not serving the penalty within three laps.

==== Fourth quarter ====
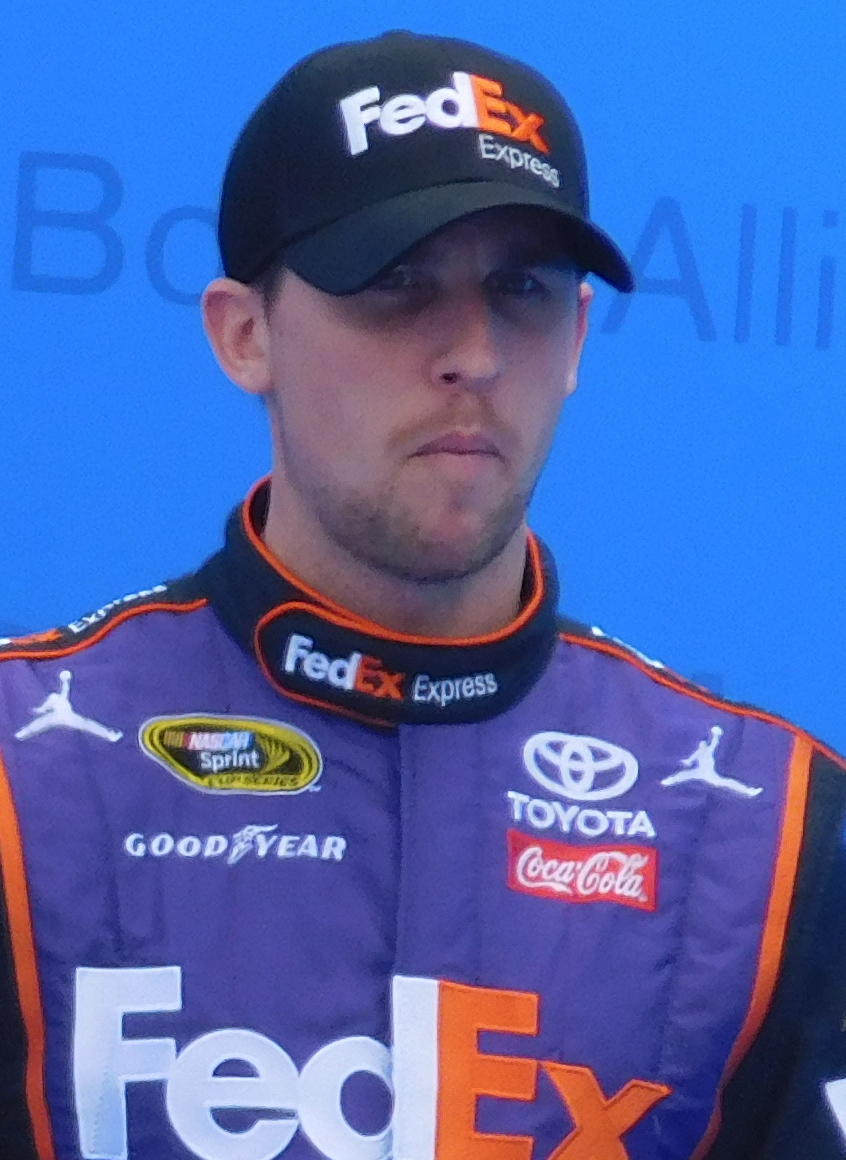
Denny Hamlin scored his 27th career victory in Sprint Cup, his first in the Daytona 500.

The fifth caution of the race flew with 29 laps to go for a single-car wreck in turn 4. Exiting the turn, Earnhardt got loose, turned down the track and slammed the inside wall. He said that he got caught "by surprise there. I was trying to sidedraft the guy beside me. We’ve been working on the balance all day. That was our problem. We underestimated how important handling was going to be today. We had a rocket all week. But in two-car runs and in night races the car handled great. We’ve got to do a little more drafting next time. When we come back we’ll be ready for the balance. We were starting to move forward, getting aggressive. Just lost it.”

The race restarted with 25 laps to go. The sixth caution of the race flew with 18 laps to go for a two-car spin on the backstretch. Heading towards turn 3, Greg Biffle got into the left-rear corner panel of Patrick and sent her spinning through the grass. Her car hopped once through the air and the splitter dug into the ground. Biffle then overcorrected and side-slammed the wall. Patrick said that she was in a position that she "shouldn’t have been in. There is some confusion about whether there actually was a man over the wall too early. We shouldn’t have been racing for the lucky dog.”

The race restarted with 12 laps to go. Kenseth remained comfortably in the lead as the outside line continued to lose momentum. Kenseth had asked over the team radio that, since Toyota drivers occupied the top 5 places, they should work as a team until the final lap, at which point they would start racing each other so as to get a team victory and avoid wrecks. When the white flag waved for the final lap, Kevin Harvick in his Chevy drafted up the outside, overtaking the Toyota of Carl Edwards. Denny Hamlin saw the advancing Harvick and jumped to the outside line from 4th to block his advance, was bumped by Harvick on the back straight and drafted all the way to the front past Kyle Busch and Martin Truex and drew alongside his teammate Kenseth. Kenseth came down on Hamlin, got himself loose and fell back to finish 14th. Hamlin and Truex drag raced to the finish line and Hamlin prevailed by 0.010 seconds, the closest in Daytona 500 history.

== Post-race ==
Hamlin, when interviewed post-race in victory lane spoke that winning the 2016 Daytona 500 "Is the best. I mean, it’s just the best. It’s the biggest race of my life. The Daytona 500 is – as a kid what you – this is the pinnacle of our sport and I’m just proud to be here. The last thing I wanted to do was wreck off turn four with my Toyota teammates and none of us win. We had talked about a plan overnight to just work together, work together and I’ve never seen it executed so flawlessly as what we did today.”

After coming up just short, Truex said he "did all I thought I could do. I had the lead. I probably should have run him up a little more, just lost in the last second. ... Really proud of everybody. Really proud of the teamwork with the JGR guys. We're team players, and we're in it for the long haul with them. Congrats to Denny. He beat me by a couple of feet.”

After an injury kept Kyle Busch out of the previous year's Daytona 500, he said of his third-place finish that it was "definitely a lot better to be in the race where I’m supposed to be than standing on the sidelines watching across the street. It played out real well. We ran up front most of the day. We were probably the top (Joe Gibbs Racing) running car most of the day, but you have to lead the last laps and I didn’t get a chance to.”

After finishing sixth in his quest to repeat as Daytona 500 champion, Logano said that Harvick "got in front of me and we started moving and then the 11 (Hamlin) saw that and jumped up there and got the push from both of us and then it was a heck of a finish. I don’t like being behind watching it. I want to be involved with it. Overall it is a great start for our Shell Pennzoil team and we kicked off the season with a bunch of great finishes down here in Daytona and we are looking forward to getting to Atlanta."

After going from the lead to 14th on the final lap, Kenseth said that he "wouldn't trade that position for anybody in the whole field. I didn't really think the outside was going to muster up enough run to get it to be honest with you. Somehow, (Hamlin) just got a massive run. Hindsight I probably should have stayed in front of Martin and tried to race him back to the line. It looked like he was going so fast I could get in front of him and get a little boost and I just couldn't."

== Race results ==
Pos	No.	Driver	Team	Manufacturer	Laps	Points
1	11	Denny Hamlin	Joe Gibbs Racing	Toyota	200	45
2	78	Martin Truex Jr.	Furniture Row Racing	Toyota	200	40
3	18	Kyle Busch	Joe Gibbs Racing	Toyota	200	39
4	4	Kevin Harvick	Stewart–Haas Racing	Chevrolet	200	37
5	19	Carl Edwards	Joe Gibbs Racing	Toyota	200	36
6	22	Joey Logano	Team Penske	Ford	200	35
7	42	Kyle Larson	Chip Ganassi Racing	Chevrolet	200	34
8	7	Regan Smith	Tommy Baldwin Racing	Chevrolet	200	33
9	3	Austin Dillon	Richard Childress Racing	Chevrolet	200	33
10	41	Kurt Busch	Stewart–Haas Racing	Chevrolet	200	31
11	31	Ryan Newman	Richard Childress Racing	Chevrolet	200	31
12	43	Aric Almirola	Richard Petty Motorsports	Ford	200	29
13	5	Kasey Kahne	Hendrick Motorsports	Chevrolet	200	28
14	20	Matt Kenseth	Joe Gibbs Racing	Toyota	200	28
15	59	Michael McDowell	Circle Sport – Leavine Family Racing	Chevrolet	200	26
16	48	Jimmie Johnson	Hendrick Motorsports	Chevrolet	200	26
17	1	Jamie McMurray	Chip Ganassi Racing	Chevrolet	200	24
18	27	Paul Menard	Richard Childress Racing	Chevrolet	200	23
19	21	Ryan Blaney (R)	Wood Brothers Racing	Ford	200	22
20	2	Brad Keselowski	Team Penske	Ford	200	22
21	47	A. J. Allmendinger	JTG Daugherty Racing	Chevrolet	200	20
22	17	Ricky Stenhouse Jr.	Roush Fenway Racing	Ford	200	19
23	38	Landon Cassill	Front Row Motorsports	Ford	200	18
24	44	Brian Scott (R)	Richard Petty Motorsports	Ford	200	18
25	95	Ty Dillon (i)	Circle Sport – Leavine Family Racing	Chevrolet	200	0
26	14	Brian Vickers	Stewart–Haas Racing	Chevrolet	200	15
27	46	Michael Annett	HScott Motorsports	Chevrolet	200	15
28	6	Trevor Bayne	Roush Fenway Racing	Ford	200	13
29	23	David Ragan	BK Racing	Toyota	200	13
30	83	Michael Waltrip	BK Racing	Toyota	200	12
31	32	Bobby Labonte	Go FAS Racing	Ford	200	11
32	13	Casey Mears	Germain Racing	Chevrolet	199	9
33	15	Clint Bowyer	HScott Motorsports	Chevrolet	199	8
34	16	Greg Biffle	Roush Fenway Racing	Ford	198	7
35	10	Danica Patrick	Stewart–Haas Racing	Chevrolet	184	6
36	88	Dale Earnhardt Jr.	Hendrick Motorsports	Chevrolet	169	6
37	24	Chase Elliott (R)	Hendrick Motorsports	Chevrolet	160	5
38	26	Robert Richardson Jr.	BK Racing	Toyota	135	3
39	34	Chris Buescher (R)	Front Row Motorsports	Ford	91	2
40	93	Matt DiBenedetto	BK Racing	Toyota	91	1
Official Daytona 500 results

=== Race statistics ===
- 20 lead changes among 15 different drivers
- 6 cautions for 31 laps
- Time of race: 3 hours, 10 minutes, 25 seconds
- Average speed: 157.549 mph (253.551 km/h)
- Difference between 1st and 2nd: 0.01 seconds

Lap leaders
Laps	Leader
1-3	Chase Elliott (R)
4-17	Dale Earnhardt Jr.
18-21	Kyle Busch
22	Dale Earnhardt Jr.
23	Ryan Newman
24-57	Denny Hamlin
58	Martin Truex Jr.
59	Bobby Labonte
60-77	Jimmie Johnson
78-92	Kyle Busch
93	David Ragan
94	Michael Waltrip
95-119	Denny Hamlin
120	Martin Truex Jr.
121-155	Denny Hamlin
156	Austin Dillon
157	Brad Keselowski
158	Michael Annett
159	Brian Scott (R)
160-199	Matt Kenseth
200	Denny Hamlin

Total laps led
Leader	Laps
Denny Hamlin	95
Matt Kenseth	40
Kyle Busch	19
Jimmie Johnson	18
Dale Earnhardt Jr.	15
Chase Elliott (R)	3
Martin Truex Jr.	2
Austin Dillon	1
Ryan Newman	1
Brad Keselowski	1
Brian Scott (R)	1
Michael Annett	1
David Ragan	1
Michael Waltrip	1
Bobby Labonte	1

==== Race awards ====
- Coors Light Pole Award: Chase Elliott (45.845, 196.314 mph (315.937 km/h))
- American Ethanol Green Flag Restart Award: Paul Menard
- Duralast Brakes "Bake In The Race" Award: Kyle Busch
- Ingersoll Rand Power Move: Michael McDowell (16 positions)
- MAHLE Clevite Engine Builder of the Race: Toyota Racing Development, #11
- Mobil 1 Driver of the Race: Denny Hamlin (139.1 driver rating)
- Moog Steering and Suspension Problem Solver of The Race: Carl Edwards (crew chief Dave Rogers (0.239 seconds))
- NASCAR Sprint Cup Leader Bonus: No winner: rolls over to $20,000 at next event
- Sherwin-Williams Fastest Lap: A. J. Allmendinger
- Sunoco Rookie of The Race: Ryan Blaney

== Media ==
=== Television ===
Since 2001 – with the exception of 2002, 2004 and 2006 – the Daytona 500 has been carried by Fox in the United States. The booth crew consisted of longtime NASCAR lap-by-lap announcer Mike Joy, three-time Daytona 500 champion Jeff Gordon, and 1989 race winner Darrell Waltrip. Pit road was manned by Jamie Little, Chris Neville, Vince Welch and Matt Yocum.

Fox Television
Booth announcers	Pit reporters
Lap-by-lap: Mike Joy; Color-commentator: Jeff Gordon; Color commentator: Darrell Waltrip	Jamie Little; Chris Neville; Vince Welch; Matt Yocum

=== Radio ===
The race was broadcast on radio by the Motor Racing Network – which has covered the Daytona 500 since 1970 – and simulcast on Sirius XM NASCAR Radio. The booth crew consisted of longtime announcer Joe Moore, Jeff Striegle and 1989 Sprint Cup Series champion Rusty Wallace. Longtime turn announcer – and prodigy of MRN co-founder Ken Squier – Dave Moody was the lead turn announcer. He called the Daytona 500 from atop the Sunoco tower outside the exit of turn 2 when the field was racing through turns 1 and 2. Mike Bagley worked the backstretch for the Daytona 500 from a spotter's stand on the inside of the track. Kyle Rickey called the Daytona 500 when the field was racing through turns 3 and 4 from the Sunoco tower outside the exit of turn 4. On pit road, MRN was manned by lead pit reporter and NASCAR Hall of Fame Executive Director Winston Kelley. He was joined on pit road by Steve Post and Alex Hayden.

MRN Radio
Booth announcers	Turn announcers	Pit reporters
Lead announcer: Joe Moore; Announcer: Jeff Striegle; Announcer: Rusty Wallace	Turns 1 & 2: Dave Moody; Backstretch: Mike Bagley; Turns 3 & 4: Kyle Rickey	Alex Hayden; Winston Kelley; Steve Post

== Standings after the race ==
Drivers' Championship standings

Pos	Driver	Points
1	Denny Hamlin	45
2	Martin Truex Jr.	40 (–5)
3	Kyle Busch	39 (–6)
4	Kevin Harvick	37 (–8)
5	Carl Edwards	36 (–9)
6	Joey Logano	35 (–10)
7	Kyle Larson	34 (–11)
8	Regan Smith	33 (–12)
9	Austin Dillon	33 (–12)
10	Kurt Busch	31 (–14)
11	Ryan Newman	31 (–14)
12	Aric Almirola	29 (–16)
13	Kasey Kahne	28 (–17)
14	Matt Kenseth	28 (–17)
15	Michael McDowell	26 (–18)
16	Jimmie Johnson	26 (–18)
Official driver's standings

Manufacturers' Championship standings

Pos	Manufacturer	Points
1	Toyota	45
2	Chevrolet	37 (–8)
3	Ford	35 (–10)
Official manufacturers' standings

- Note: Only the first 16 positions are included for the driver standings.

== Notes ==
Previous race: 2015 Ford EcoBoost 400	Sprint Cup Series; 2016 season	Next race: 2016 Folds of Honor QuikTrip 500
