= 2008 Daytona 500 =

Auto race held at Daytona, United States in 2008

Race details
- Race 1 of 36 in the 2008 NASCAR Sprint Cup Series
- Date: February 17, 2008
- Location: Daytona International Speedway; Daytona Beach, Florida, U.S.
- Course: Permanent racing facility 2.5 mi (4.023 km)
- Distance: 200 laps, 500 mi (800 km)
- Weather: Temperatures reaching up to 82 °F (28 °C); wind speeds approaching 11.1 miles per hour (17.9 km/h)
- Average speed: 152.672 miles per hour (245.702 km/h)

Pole position
Driver	Jimmie Johnson	Hendrick Motorsports

Qualifying race winners
Duel 1 Winner	Dale Earnhardt Jr.	Hendrick Motorsports
Duel 2 Winner	Denny Hamlin	Joe Gibbs Racing

Most laps led
Driver	Kyle Busch	Joe Gibbs Racing
- Laps: 86

Winner
No. 12	Ryan Newman	Penske Racing

Television in the United States
- Network: Fox
- Announcers: Mike Joy, Darrell Waltrip, and Larry McReynolds
- Nielsen ratings: 10.2/20

The 2008 Daytona 500, the 50th annual running of the event, was held on February 17, 2008 at Daytona International Speedway in Daytona Beach, Florida. The race was the 50th to be run since the first in 1959, won by Lee Petty. To commemorate the event, the Harley J. Earl Trophy, which goes to the winner of the race, was plated in gold instead of silver. In addition, the winning car was placed on display for one year at the Daytona 500 Experience attraction just outside Turn Four. Ryan Newman won the race, his only win in the 2008 season and his final win for team owner Roger Penske. The race was the first Daytona 500 win for Penske Racing, the first run using NASCAR's Car of Tomorrow, and the first official race under the new Sprint Cup banner.

== A number of firsts ==
The race was the first Daytona 500 win for Penske Racing and the first run using NASCAR's Car of Tomorrow, which was introduced in 2007 and became standard in 2008. Additionally, this was the first official race under the new Sprint Cup banner as the telecommunications giant replaces Nextel as the series sponsor after their 2005 merger. Ryan Newman's victory with the number 12 car in the Daytona 500 was the first time since Bobby Allison's #12 won the race in 1988, 20 years prior.

== Television and radio coverage ==
The race was televised on FOX in the USA, with the telecast scheduled beginning at 2 p.m. EST. 1960 Daytona 500 winner Junior Johnson drove the pace car and the green flag was waved the honorary starter, seven-time race winner Richard Petty around 3:30 p.m. Radio coverage was handled by MRN Radio and started at about 2:30 EST. Trisha Yearwood performed the national anthem, followed by a flyover from the U.S. Air Force Thunderbirds precision flying team. As many as 31 past champions of this race served as Grand Marshals for this historic event to deliver the command to start the engines.

== Celebrity tickets for charity ==
To commemorate the golden running of "The Great American Race", Daytona International Speedway held a “Celebrity Tickets for Charity” competition. Those designs were whittled on daytona500.com by internet users down to the top ten choices. Celebrities including Daytona 500 winners Kevin Harvick, Dale Earnhardt Jr., Michael Waltrip, Jimmie Johnson and Mario Andretti, sitcom stars Jason Lee and Leah Remini, TV hosts Kelly Ripa (Live with Regis and Kelly), Jeff Foxworthy (Are You Smarter Than a 5th Grader?) and Carson Daly (Last Call with Carson Daly), NASCAR announcers Mike Joy from FOX and Dr. Jerry Punch from ESPN, wrestler Goldberg and skateboarding legend Tony Hawk submitted ticket designs. A blue-ribbon panel made up of NASCAR's family selected the winner and announced it prior to the running of the Pepsi 400, with the ten finalists among Harvick (defending 2007 champion), Earnhardt Jr. (2004 winner), Andretti (1967 winner) and Marvin Panch (1961 winner), Hawk, Joy, Katie Cole (the second of two designs), Foxworthy, and two children – 17-year-old Patrick McRae (for Jimmie Johnson, the 2006 winner) and seven-year-old Derek Wynne (for owner Rick Hendrick). Foxworthy was later declared the winner of the contest and his winning ticket artwork along with the others of all the celebrities were auctioned off to benefit the Jeff Gordon Foundation.

== Purse ==
As befitting the official start of the NASCAR season, the posted awards (announced on January 28, 2008) was a record $18,689,238 (US), with the winning team and their driver taking home a minimum of $1,445,250.

== Entry list ==
- (W) denotes past 500 winner.
- (R) denotes rookie driver.

No.	Driver	Team	Manufacturer
00	David Reutimann	Michael Waltrip Racing	Toyota
01	Regan Smith (R)	Dale Earnhardt Inc.	Chevrolet
1	Martin Truex Jr.	Dale Earnhardt Inc.	Chevrolet
2	Kurt Busch	Penske Racing South	Dodge
5	Casey Mears	Hendrick Motorsports	Chevrolet
6	David Ragan	Roush Fenway Racing	Ford
07	Clint Bowyer	Richard Childress Racing	Chevrolet
7	Robby Gordon	Robby Gordon Motorsports	Dodge
08	Carl Long	E&M Motorsports	Dodge
8	Mark Martin	Dale Earnhardt Inc.	Chevrolet
09	Sterling Marlin (W)	Phoenix Racing	Chevrolet
9	Kasey Kahne	Gillett Evernham Motorsports	Dodge
10	Patrick Carpentier (R)	Gillett Evernham Motorsports	Dodge
11	Denny Hamlin	Joe Gibbs Racing	Toyota
12	Ryan Newman	Penske Racing South	Dodge
15	Paul Menard	Dale Earnhardt Inc.	Chevrolet
16	Greg Biffle	Roush Fenway Racing	Ford
17	Matt Kenseth	Roush Fenway Racing	Ford
18	Kyle Busch	Joe Gibbs Racing	Toyota
19	Elliott Sadler	Gillett Evernham Motorsports	Dodge
20	Tony Stewart	Joe Gibbs Racing	Toyota
21	Bill Elliott (W)	Wood Brothers Racing	Ford
22	Dave Blaney	Bill Davis Racing	Toyota
24	Jeff Gordon (W)	Hendrick Motorsports	Chevrolet
26	Jamie McMurray	Roush Fenway Racing	Ford
27	Jacques Villeneuve (R)	Bill Davis Racing	Toyota
28	Travis Kvapil	Robert Yates Racing	Ford
29	Kevin Harvick (W)	Richard Childress Racing	Chevrolet
31	Jeff Burton	Richard Childress Racing	Chevrolet
34	John Andretti	Front Row Motorsports	Chevrolet
37	Eric McClure	Front Row Motorsports	Chevrolet
38	David Gilliland	Robert Yates Racing	Ford
40	Dario Franchitti (R)	Chip Ganassi Racing	Dodge
41	Reed Sorenson	Chip Ganassi Racing	Dodge
42	Juan Pablo Montoya	Chip Ganassi Racing	Dodge
43	Bobby Labonte	Petty Enterprises	Dodge
44	Dale Jarrett (W)	Michael Waltrip Racing	Toyota
45	Kyle Petty	Petty Enterprises	Dodge
48	Jimmie Johnson (W)	Hendrick Motorsports	Chevrolet
49	Ken Schrader	BAM Racing	Dodge
50	Stanton Barrett	SKI Motorsports	Chevrolet
55	Michael Waltrip (W)	Michael Waltrip Racing	Toyota
60	Boris Said	No Fear Racing	Ford
66	Scott Riggs	Haas CNC Racing	Chevrolet
70	Jeremy Mayfield	Haas CNC Racing	Chevrolet
77	Sam Hornish Jr. (R)	Penske Racing South	Dodge
78	Joe Nemechek	Furniture Row Racing	Chevrolet
83	Brian Vickers	Red Bull Racing Team	Toyota
84	A. J. Allmendinger	Red Bull Racing Team	Toyota
87	Kenny Wallace	Furniture Row Racing	Chevrolet
88	Dale Earnhardt Jr. (W)	Hendrick Motorsports	Chevrolet
96	J. J. Yeley	Hall of Fame Racing	Toyota
99	Carl Edwards	Roush Fenway Racing	Ford
Official Entry list

== Qualifying ==
=== Pole ===
As is the unique approach that is The Great American Race, qualifying, which was held on February 10, only the top two drivers (which will be the front row) were locked in, with Jimmie Johnson taking position one and Michael Waltrip sitting next to him. Also qualifying via the fastest speeds among the "Go or Go Home" entries were Joe Nemechek and David Reutimann.

=== Gatorade Duels ===
The remaining spots were determined by the top finishers excluding the front row drivers in two 150-mile (240 km) races called the Gatorade Duels, which were raced February 14, which filled the next 36 positions. The remaining spots were determined by exemptions and the fastest speeds and a champions provisional.

==== Results of the Duels ====
Drivers in boldface qualified to the Daytona 500.

===== Race 1 Results =====
Top 10 Finishers (Race #1)
Pos.	Car #	Driver	Car Make	Team
1	88	Dale Earnhardt Jr.	Chevrolet	Hendrick Motorsports
2	41	Reed Sorenson	Dodge	Chip Ganassi Racing
3	12	Ryan Newman	Dodge	Penske Racing
4	5	Casey Mears	Chevrolet	Hendrick Motorsports
5	99	Carl Edwards	Ford	Roush Fenway Racing
6	43	Bobby Labonte	Dodge	Petty Enterprises
7	42	Juan Pablo Montoya	Dodge	Chip Ganassi Racing
8	87	**Kenny Wallace**	Chevrolet	Furniture Row Racing
9	77	Sam Hornish Jr.	Dodge	Penske Racing
10	15	Paul Menard	Chevrolet	Dale Earnhardt, Inc.

Also advancing to Daytona 500: 83-Brian Vickers

===== Race 2 Results =====
Top 10 Finishers (Race #2)
Pos.	Car #	Driver	Car Make	Team
1	11	Denny Hamlin	Toyota	Joe Gibbs Racing
2	20	Tony Stewart	Toyota	Joe Gibbs Racing
3	24	Jeff Gordon	Chevrolet	Hendrick Motorsports
4	9	Kasey Kahne	Dodge	Gillett Evernham Motorsports
5	8	Mark Martin	Chevrolet	Dale Earnhardt, Inc.
6	6	David Ragan	Ford	Roush Fenway Racing
7	29	Kevin Harvick	Chevrolet	Richard Childress Racing
8	16	Greg Biffle	Ford	Roush Fenway Racing
9	44	**Dale Jarrett**	Toyota	Michael Waltrip Racing
10	34	**John Andretti**	Chevrolet	Front Row Motorsports

NOTE: Race #2 was extended four laps due to green-white-checker finish rule.

Failed to qualify:

- Race One: 84-A. J. Allmendinger, 21-Bill Elliott, 60-Boris Said, 09-Sterling Marlin, and 08-Carl Long.
- Race Two: 49-Ken Schrader, 10-Patrick Carpentier, 37-Eric McClure, 27-Jacques Villeneuve, 50-Stanton Barrett Jr.

== Race ==
In the beginning of the race, Jimmie Johnson and Michael Waltrip started on the front row. For the first 151 laps, there were only two caution flags, both thrown for debris. Jeff Gordon went to the garage after leading a few laps due to a broken suspension. On lap 161, David Ragan tried to block Matt Kenseth but brought out the 3rd caution when Ragan squeezed Kenseth into the wall. The next caution flew on lap 176, when Johnson spun out on the backstretch, and Martin Truex Jr. spun because of the shuffle in the field. Clint Bowyer led the next two laps, but was shuffled through the field and was eventually spun by Juan Pablo Montoya, bringing out the 5th caution. However, he did not have any damage from the crash. The biggest crash occurred on lap 189 when Kevin Harvick knocked Dave Blaney into the wall, collecting Mark Martin, Michael Waltrip, Casey Mears, Denny Hamlin, Travis Kvapil, and Carl Edwards. Mears did not pit and wound up 4th in the field despite minor damage. On lap 195, Jeff Burton worked his way up to first. Mears tried to block Tony Stewart, who went with Burton, but turned himself into the wall, bringing out another caution. Burton had a fuel problem on the restart, resulting in Stewart passing him on the outside, bringing Ryan Newman, Kurt and Kyle Busch and Reed Sorenson. Stewart led the next two laps. On the last lap, Ky. Busch jumped to the inside, bringing Stewart with him. Newman was on the outside now. It was a shootout going into the final turn between Newman, Stewart, and the Busch Brothers. Ky. Busch jumped to the inside of Stewart, but Ku. Busch pushed Newman, allowing him to win the 50th running of the Daytona 500.

=== Results ===
Results of the 50th Daytona 500
Pos	Grid	Car	Driver	Make	Team	Laps	Status	Winnings (in US$)
1	7	12	Ryan Newman	Dodge	Penske Racing	200	Running	$1,506,040
2	43	2	Kurt Busch	Dodge	Penske Racing	200	Running	$1,063,870
3	6	20	Tony Stewart	Toyota	Joe Gibbs Racing	200	Running	$871,049
4	24	18	Kyle Busch^{•}	Toyota	Joe Gibbs Racing	200	Running	$652,938
5	5	41	Reed Sorenson	Dodge	Chip Ganassi Racing	200	Running	$545,959
6	35	19	Elliott Sadler	Dodge	Gillett Evernham Motorsports	200	Running	$430,015
7	10	9	Kasey Kahne	Dodge	Gillett Evernham Motorsports	200	Running	$389,204
8	26	7	Robby Gordon^{*}	Dodge	Robby Gordon Motorsports	200	Running	$352,921
9	3	88	Dale Earnhardt Jr. (W)	Chevrolet	Hendrick Motorsports	200	Running	$352,920
10	18	16	Greg Biffle	Ford	Roush Fenway Racing	200	Running	$313,763
11	13	43	Bobby Labonte	Dodge	Petty Enterprises	200	Running	$329,756
12	23	83	Brian Vickers	Toyota	Red Bull Racing Team	200	Running	$285,245
13	36	31	Jeff Burton	Chevrolet	Richard Childress Racing	200	Running	$323,496
14	16	29	Kevin Harvick (W)	Chevrolet	Richard Childress Racing	200	Running	$322,224
15	19	77	Sam Hornish Jr. (R)	Dodge	Penske Racing	200	Running	$319,845
16	20	44	Dale Jarrett (W)	Toyota	Michael Waltrip Racing	200	Running	$277,213
17	4	11	Denny Hamlin	Toyota	Joe Gibbs Racing	200	Running	$341,416
18	42	00	David Reutimann	Toyota	Michael Waltrip Racing	200	Running	$291,221
19	11	99	Carl Edwards	Ford	Roush Fenway Racing	200	Running	$321,520
20	25	1	Martin Truex Jr.	Chevrolet	Dale Earnhardt, Inc.	200	Running	$303,978
21	27	66	Scott Riggs	Chevrolet	Haas CNC Racing	200	Running	$287,928
22	21	15	Paul Menard (R)	Chevrolet	Dale Earnhardt, Inc.	200	Running	$279,295
23	33	70	Jeremy Mayfield	Chevrolet	Haas CNC Racing	200	Running	$271,220
24	31	07	Clint Bowyer	Chevrolet	Richard Childress Racing	200	Running	$284,545
25	37	96	J. J. Yeley	Toyota	Hall of Fame Racing	200	Running	$277,095
26	38	26	Jamie McMurray	Ford	Roush Fenway Racing	200	Running	$276,888
27	1	48	Jimmie Johnson (W)	Chevrolet	Hendrick Motorsports	200	Running	$329,606
28	32	38	David Gilliland	Ford	Robert Yates Racing	200	Running	$278,746
29	2	55	Michael Waltrip (W)	Toyota	Michael Waltrip Racing	200	Running	$275,135
30	30	28	Travis Kvapil	Ford	Robert Yates Racing	200	Running	$291,202
31	12	8	Mark Martin	Chevrolet	Dale Earnhardt, Inc.	200	Running	$301,846
32	15	42	Juan Pablo Montoya	Dodge	Chip Ganassi Racing	200	Running	$290,753
33	40	40	Dario Franchitti (R)	Dodge	Chip Ganassi Racing	−1	Running	$270,613
34	39	45	Kyle Petty	Dodge	Petty Enterprises	−3	Running	$260,320
35	9	5	Casey Mears	Chevrolet	Hendrick Motorsports	−6	Accident	$284,945
36	28	17	Matt Kenseth	Ford	Roush Fenway Racing	−6	Running	$308,129
37	29	01	Regan Smith (R)	Chevrolet	Dale Earnhardt, Inc.	−6	Running	$267,095
38	34	22	Dave Blaney	Toyota	Bill Davis Racing	−11	Accident	$259,563
39	8	24	Jeff Gordon (W)	Chevrolet	Hendrick Motorsports	−14	Suspension	$319,599
40	22	34	John Andretti	Chevrolet	Front Row Motorsports	−16	Running	$258,613
41	41	78	Joe Nemechek	Chevrolet	Furniture Row Racing	−29	Running	$258,470
42	14	6	David Ragan	Ford	Roush Fenway Racing	−39	Accident	$267,763
43	17	87	Kenny Wallace	Chevrolet	Furniture Row Racing	−59	Engine	$256,735

(W) – Denotes former race winner. (R) – Denotes rookie.

• – Led most laps

Average Speed: 152.672 mph (245.702 km/h)
Margin of Victory: .092 seconds
Time of Race: Three hours, 16 minutes and 30 seconds
Lead Changes: 42 among 17 drivers
Cautions: Seven for 23 laps

* — On Wednesday, February 20, NASCAR docked Robby Gordon and his self-owned team both 100 owner and driver points for violations during the first day of inspections back on February 8, including an illegal nose cover. His crew chief, Frank Kerr, was fined $100,000, suspended for the next six races starting at California, and was placed on probation until 12/31/08 as a result. An appeal, heard on March 5, the points penalties and the Kerr suspension were overturned, however, the fine was increased to $150,000,

Previous race: 2007 Ford 400	Sprint Cup Series; 2008 season	Next race: 2008 Auto Club 500
