= Car of Tomorrow =

Generation of NASCAR stock cars

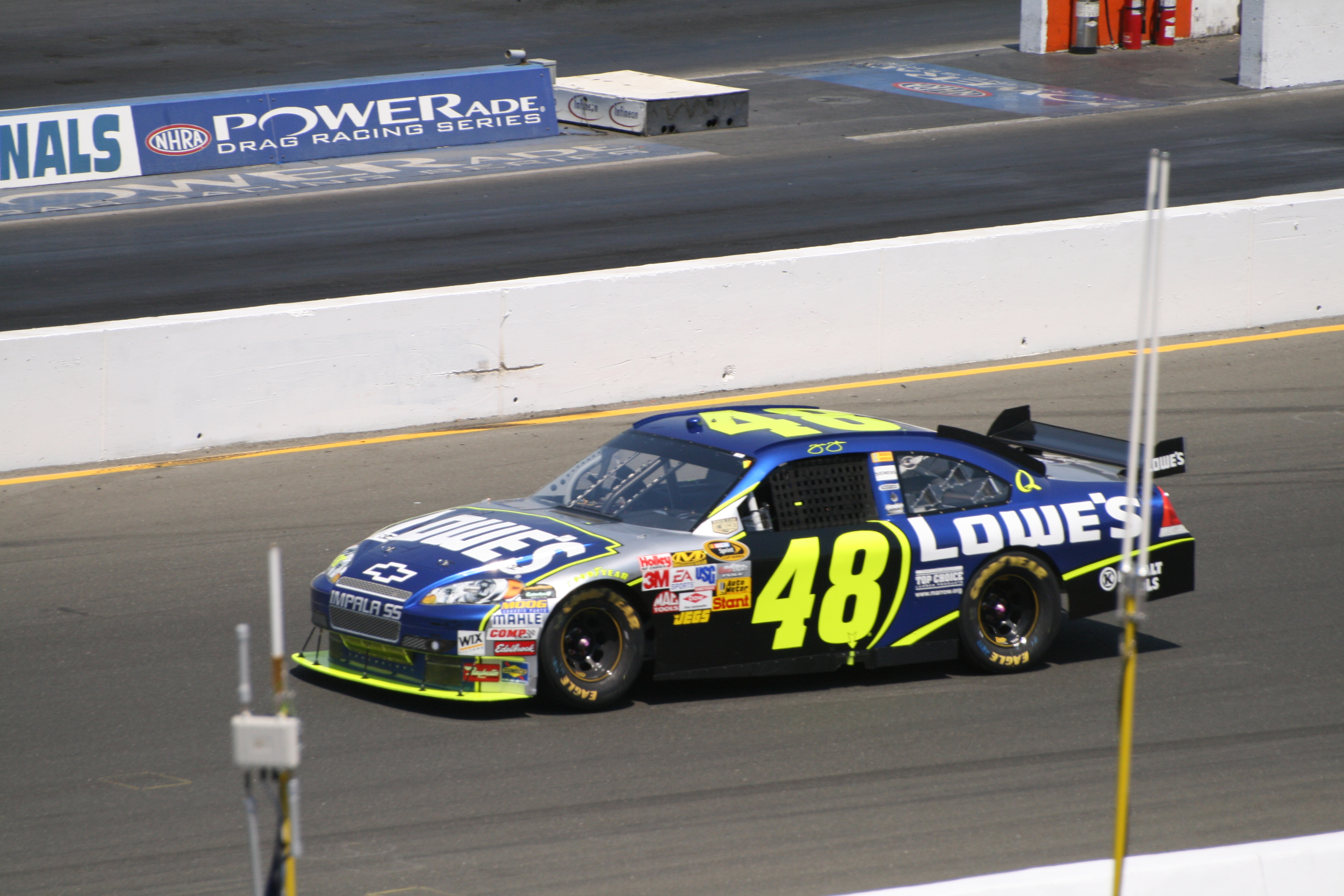
- Jimmie Johnson's 2008 Chevrolet Impala SS at Infineon Raceway
- Category: NASCAR Cup Series
- Constructor: (United States) Chevrolet (United States) Dodge (United States) Ford (Japan) Toyota
- Predecessor: Generation 4
- Successor: Generation 6

Technical specifications
- Length: 206 in (523.2 cm)
- Width: 78.5 in (199.4 cm)
- Height: 53 in (134.6 cm)
- Wheelbase: 110 in (279.4 cm)
- Engine: Chevrolet R07 (2007-2012), Dodge R5P7 (2007-2008), Dodge R6P8 (2008-2012), Ford 351 Windsor Small Block (2007-2008), Ford FR9 (2009-2012), TRD Phase-11 (2007-2008), and TRD Phase-14 (2008-2012) 5.86 L (358 cu in) V8 Naturally-aspirated FR layout
- Transmission: 4-speed manual
- Weight: 3,450 pounds (1,560 kg) (Gen 5); 3,250 lbs (Gen 6 Sprint Cup); 3,200 lbs (Xfinity)
- Fuel: Sunoco 260Gtx 98 octane race fuel: 2007–2011; Sunoco Green E15 98 octane race fuel: 2011–2012
- Tires: Goodyear

Competition history
- Debut: March 25, 2007 (2007 Food City 500)
- Last event: November 18, 2012 (2012 Ford 400)

The Car of Tomorrow (CoT) was the common name used for the chassis of the NASCAR Cup Series (2007 – 2012) and Xfinity Series (since 2011 full-time) race cars. The car was part of a five-year project to create a safer vehicle following several deaths in competition, particularly the crash at the 2001 Daytona 500 that killed Dale Earnhardt.

Used as the fifth generation car style for the Cup Series, the original Car of Tomorrow body design was larger and boxier than the design it replaced, and criticized for its generic appearance and poor handling characteristics. The CoT, however, implemented dramatic safety improvements, cost less to maintain, and was intended to make for closer competition.

The car was introduced in the 2007 Cup Series season at the Food City 500 on March 25 and ran a partial schedule of 16 races. The plan was to require all teams to use the new car in 2009, but NASCAR officials moved the date up to the 2008 season as a cost-saving measure. The Car of Tomorrow body style was retired by NASCAR after the 2012 Ford EcoBoost 400. The sixth-generation car, which featured the additional chassis safety improvements as well as improved body designs, debuted in 2013; many teams simply removed the CoT car bodies, added the new chassis safety improvements, and installed a sixth-generation car body. The chassis was used until the end of the 2021 season before eventually replaced with the Next Gen car in 2022.

In 2010, the Xfinity Series (then the Nationwide Series) debuted its own version of the CoT in a partial schedule, using the same chassis but different bodies and a shorter wheelbase; teams could take old Sprint Cup cars, change the bodies, and run them in the Nationwide Series, provided they passed recertification. The car was required for full-time competition in 2011. No deaths have occurred in NASCAR Cup Series competition since the Car of Tomorrow was introduced.

== Design ==
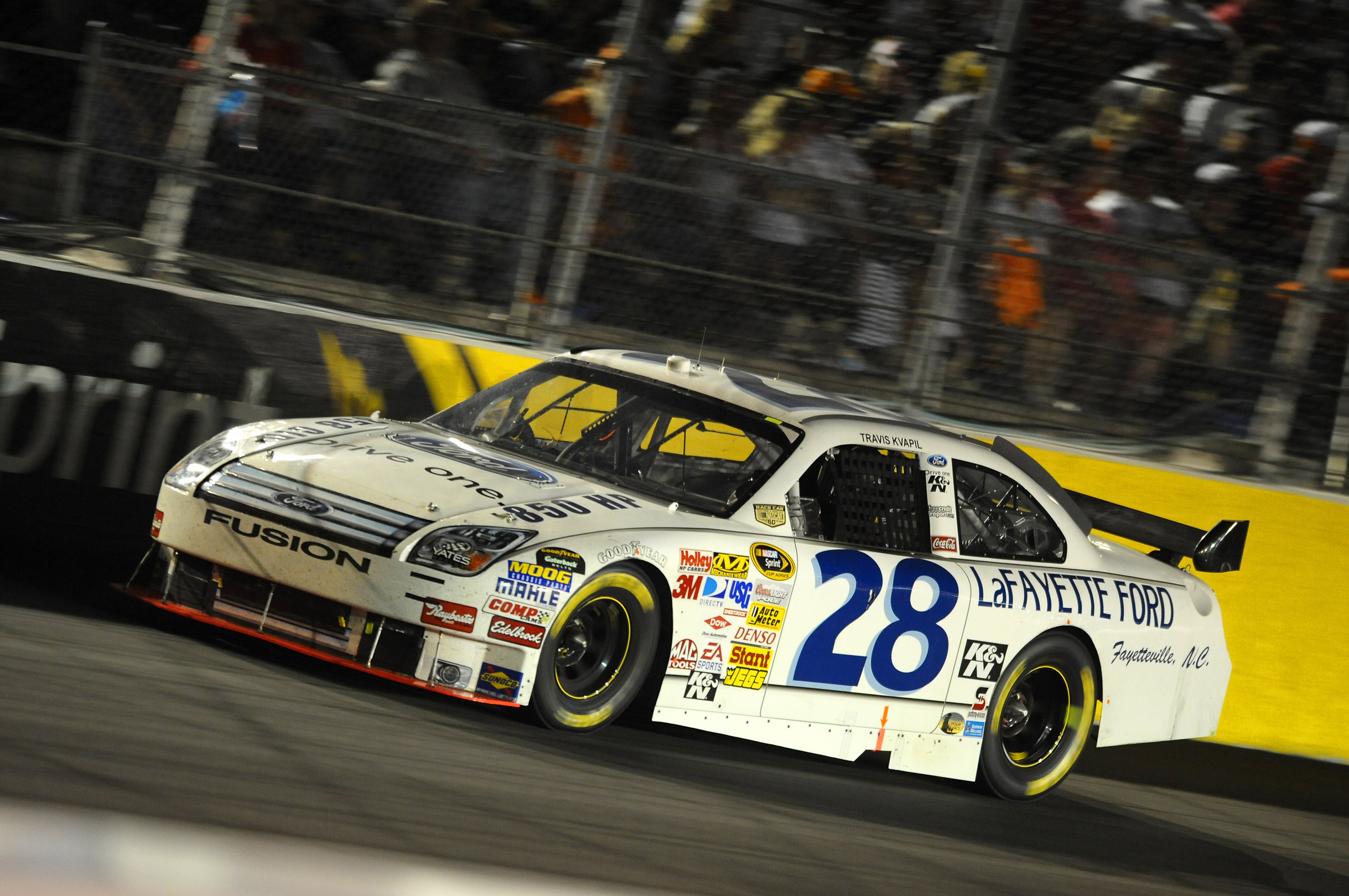
Front view of Travis Kvapil's Ford Fusion CoT at Darlington Raceway

On January 11, 2006, NASCAR revealed the Car of Tomorrow, also referred to as the "Car of the Future" during its development, after a five-year design program sparked mainly by the death of Dale Earnhardt Sr. in a final-lap crash during the 2001 Daytona 500. During the prior season, three drivers (Adam Petty, Kenny Irwin Jr. and Tony Roper) had perished in on-track accidents. The then-current cars were based on a design by Holman Moody first used for the 1966 Ford Fairlane. The primary design considerations for the new car were "safety innovations, performance and competition, and cost efficiency for teams."

The CoT incorporated several safety improvements in comparison to the older car. The driver's seat was moved four inches toward the center, and the roll cage shifted three inches to the rear, while the car was designed two inches taller and four inches wider. Larger crumple zones, designed to absorb impact energy, and impact absorbing foam were built into the car on both sides. Replacing the front valance was an adjustable splitter, a piece of fiber-reinforced plastic (FRP, "fiberglass") used on the bottom front of the car to produce downforce. The car's exhaust exits on the right (passenger) side, which diverts heat from the driver. The fuel cell was strengthened using thicker material, with a smaller capacity 17.75 US gallons (67.2 L), down from 22 US gallons (83 L), which as of 2007 had become standard in all cars.

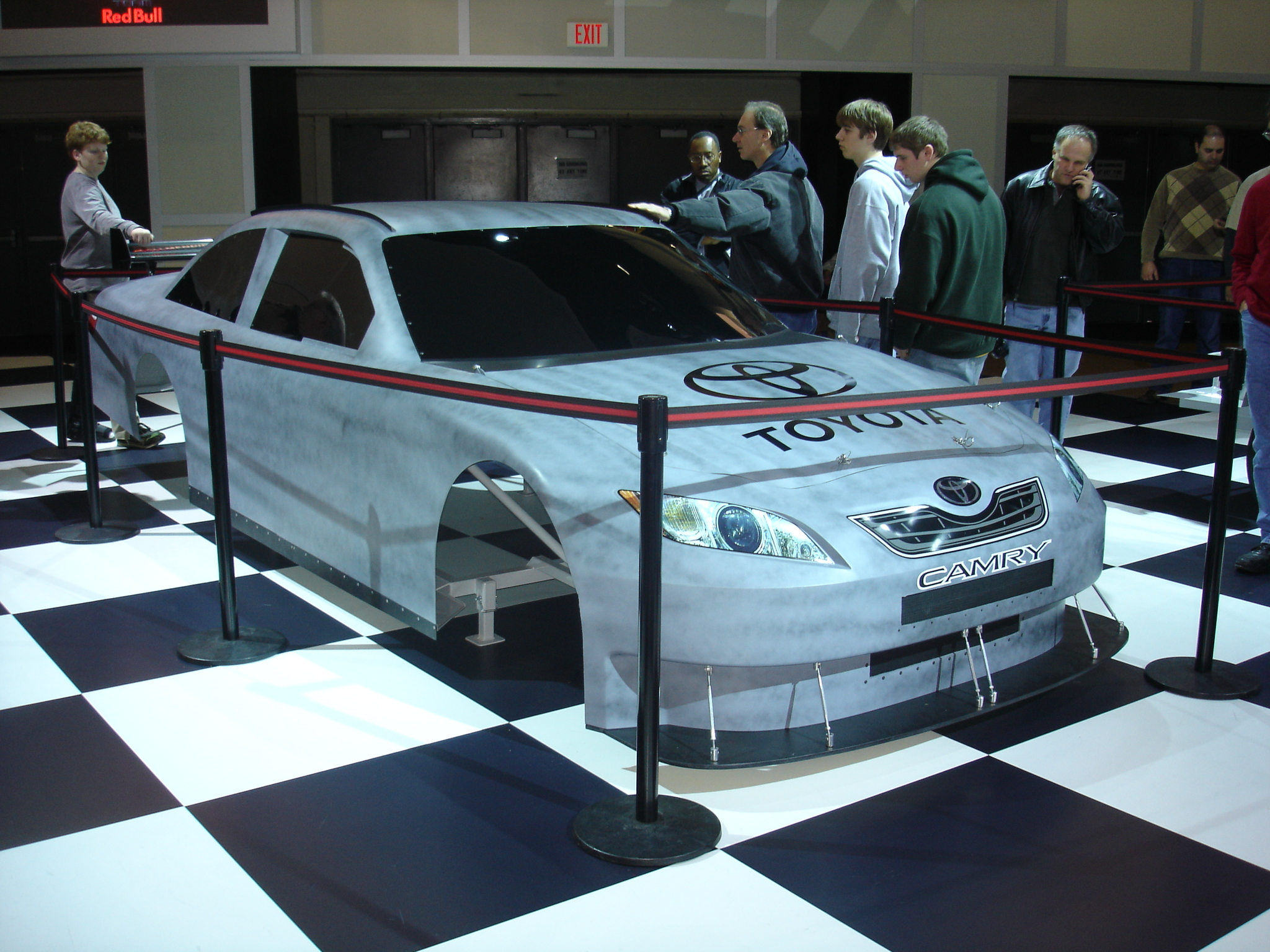
A Car of Tomorrow body with Toyota Camry decals

NASCAR officials initially claimed the car was less dependent on aerodynamics, comparing its performance to the trucks of the Craftsman Truck Series. It initially featured a detached wing, which had not been used since the Dodge Charger Daytona and Plymouth Superbird in 1970, in place of a rear spoiler. The windshield was more upright to prevent collapse in the event of a rollover, with the added effect of increased drag. The radiator air intake was placed below the front bumper of the car, to reduce overheating caused by debris-clogged grilles. The front bumper itself was more box-like and the front airdam was gapped, as opposed to being a flush piece on the older cars, to reduce aerodynamics and slow down the cars.

All cars were required to fit the same set of templates (with minor differences between the makes), using a laser inspection system (LIS) device nicknamed "the claw" that was designed to fit over the new cars. In the first two races at Bristol and Martinsville Speedway, the garages were opened one day early and the inspections took up to 10 hours so that everyone (teams, officials, etc.) could get a better grip on the new unified template. NASCAR's old rules had a different set of templates for each manufacturer (Ford, Chevrolet, Dodge, and Toyota). During the CoT era, NASCAR attempted to eliminate "gray area" and ambiguity within the rule book, and frequently adjusted the rules to ensure that different car manufacturers have relatively equal cars; one such instance of rule book changes against gray areas occurred after the 2008 Sprint All-Star Challenge, in which Sam Hornish, Jr. ran a car with skewed setup to finish second in the Showdown and advance to the All-Star Race, as well in 2012 after Hendrick Motorsports' teams ran with skewed sway bars to win five races during the spring portion of the season. With the transition to the Generation 6 car, the claw continues to be used along with manufacturer-specific templates until 2018, when both was replaced by the laser-based Optical Scanning System (OSS).

On January 15, 2010, Cup Series director John Darby informed teams that NASCAR would transition back to the spoiler, to increase downforce and prevent airborne accidents the rear wing was believed to cause. The wing was replaced by the spoiler at the 2010 Goody's Fast Pain Relief 500 the sixth points race of that season.

=== Car models ===
Although initially branded as the Monte Carlo SS (the same as the Generation 4 model), Chevrolet's Car of Tomorrow debuted as the Impala SS (later the Impala). After using the Charger name on the old car since 2005, Dodge utilized the Avenger name on the CoT, coinciding with the model's reintroduction into the production market. However, for 2008 the Charger name returned for use on the CoT due to popular demand. Ford continued to use the Fusion model while Toyota continued to use the Camry.

=== Dimensions ===
This chart lists the CoT's dimensions compared with the dimensions of their production car counterparts.

| Model | Length | Width | Height | Wheelbase | Weight* |
|---|---|---|---|---|---|
| Ford Fusion | 190.6 in (4,841 mm) | 72.2 in (1,834 mm) | 56.9 in (1,445 mm) | 107.4 in (2,728 mm) | 3,101 lb (1,407 kg) |
| Chevrolet Monte Carlo | 200.7 in (5,098 mm) | 72.5 in (1,842 mm) | 51 in (1,295 mm) | 110 in (2,794 mm) | 3,400 lb (1,542 kg) |
| Chevrolet Impala SS | 200.4 in (5,090 mm) | 72.9 in (1,852 mm) | 58.7 in (1,491 mm) | 110.5 in (2,807 mm) | 3,711 lb (1,683 kg) |
| Dodge Charger | 200.1 in (5,083 mm) | 74.4 in (1,890 mm) | 58.2 in (1,478 mm) | 120 in (3,048 mm) | 3,820 lb (1,733 kg) |
| Dodge Avenger | 190.9 in (4,849 mm) | 71.8 in (1,824 mm) | 58.9 in (1,496 mm) | 108.9 in (2,766 mm) | 3,405 lb (1,544 kg) |
| Toyota Camry | 189.2 in (4,806 mm) | 71.7 in (1,821 mm) | 57.9 in (1,471 mm) | 110.3 in (2,802 mm) | 3,263 lb (1,480 kg) |
| Holden Commodore SS-V Redline (Chevrolet SS) | 192.68 in (4,894 mm) | 74.76 in (1,899 mm) | 58.11 in (1,476 mm) | 114.76 in (2,915 mm) | 3,902 lb (1,770 kg) |
| NASCAR CoT | 206 in (5,232 mm) | 78.5 in (1,994 mm) | 53 in (1,346 mm) | 110 in (2,794 mm) | 3,200 lb (1,451 kg) excluding driver, fuel, fluids and seats; 3,400 lb (1,542 kg) including driver, fuel, fluids and seats |

*Weight displays the curb weight of the least expensive trim level available for model year 2008 unless otherwise specified. The Holden Commodore listed is a 2012 VE model with a V8 and manual transmission (which road-cars were imported for the US market). The VF Commodore debuted for the 2014 model year in early 2013 as the Chevrolet SS.

== Testing ==
The Car of Tomorrow was first tested in December 2005 at Atlanta Motor Speedway. Next it tested at the 2.5-mile Daytona International Speedway, then on NASCAR's two shortest tracks, Bristol (0.533 mi) and Martinsville (0.526 mi.), the 1.5-mile Charlotte Motor Speedway, the 2.66 mile Talladega Superspeedway, and 2.0-mile Michigan International Speedway. Former NASCAR driver, and former Cup Series pace car driver and Director of Cost Research Brett Bodine also tested the prototype car against cars prepared by current NASCAR teams.

Drivers tested the CoT concurrently with the old car at some NASCAR tests and at special NASCAR-authorized sessions. Other testing sessions occurred at the half-mile Greenville-Pickens Speedway, Caraway Speedway in Asheboro, NC, and the one-mile North Carolina Speedway (now Rockingham Speedway), none of which were Cup Series tracks at the time (North Carolina Speedway was a regular venue until 2005), and therefore did not fall under NASCAR's restrictions.

== Implementation ==
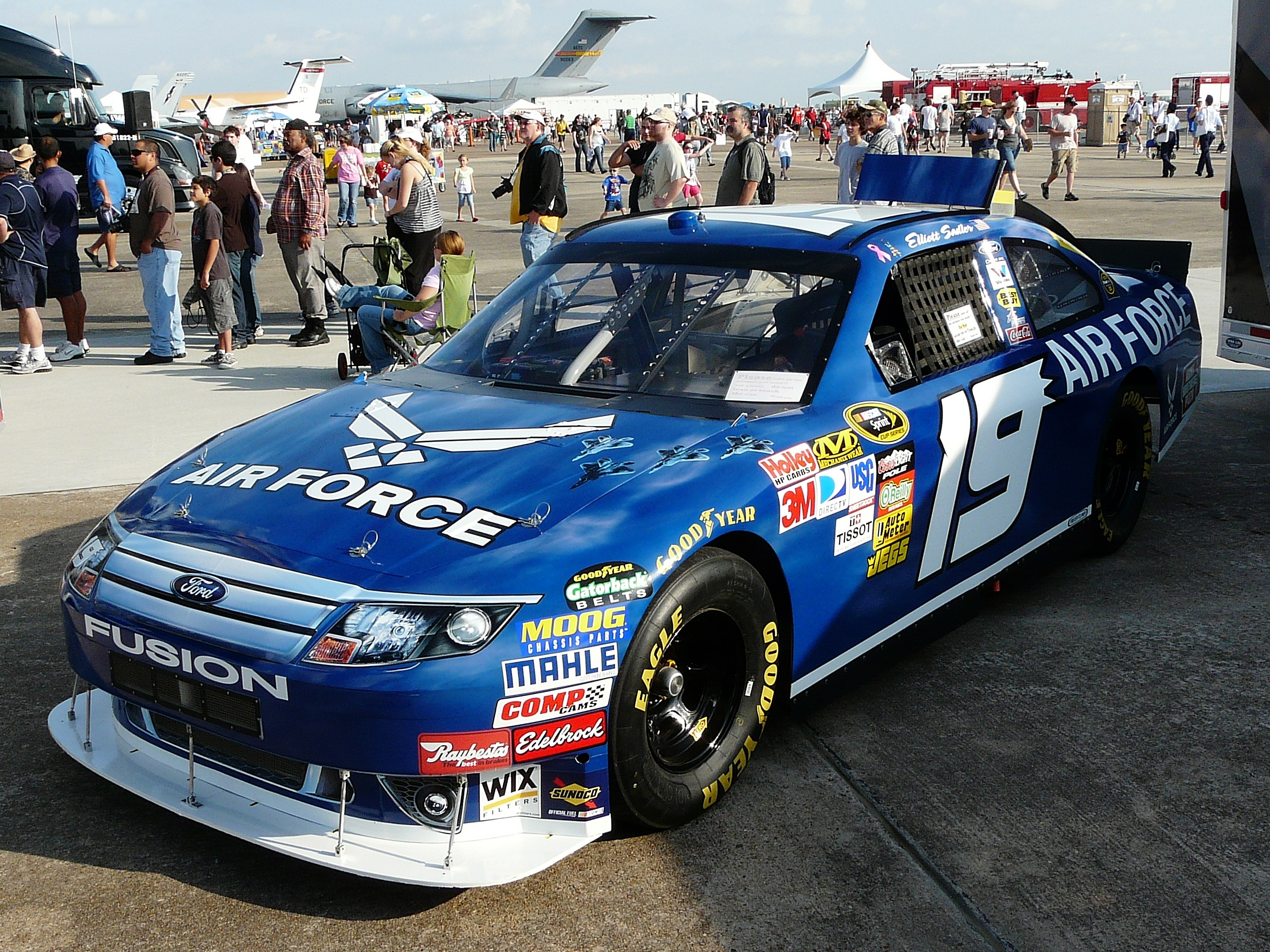
2010 NASCAR CoT Ford Fusion

The Car of Tomorrow was first raced at the 2007 Food City 500 at Bristol Motor Speedway, the season's fifth race. The tracks that saw the CoT twice in 2007 besides Bristol and Martinsville International Speedway were Phoenix Raceway, Richmond Raceway, Dover International Speedway, and New Hampshire Motor Speedway. Other than Talladega (for the fall event), Darlington Raceway and the road course races at Sonoma Raceway and Watkins Glen (N.Y.) International ran the CoT once each in 2007.

Original implementation plans called for the CoT to be used at 26 events in 2008, starting with both races at Daytona, including the season-opening Daytona 500 and related events (Budweiser Shootout and Gatorade Duels), the spring race at Talladega and Michigan, both races at Auto Club Speedway, Pocono Raceway and the event at Indianapolis Motor Speedway. Based on the success of the February 28 test at Bristol, NASCAR considered requiring the CoT for the full schedule in 2008 in order to avoid applying two sets of rules (as supported by a survey of NASCAR owners, with 80% favoring the switch), adding all three events (including the all-star event) at Charlotte Motor Speedway, as well as both races at Atlanta and Texas Motor Speedway, and single races at Chicagoland Speedway, Kansas Speedway, Las Vegas Motor Speedway and Homestead-Miami Speedway one year earlier than scheduled. This was confirmed on Tuesday, May 22, 2007, by NASCAR. Had NASCAR continued with the original schedule of implication, the other tracks would have been added in 2009. Apparently 2008 was not going to be when the CoT would make its debut. It was initially going to debut in mid to late 2005, and possibly 2004 according to NASCAR's R&D at the time. But the tests with this version plus negative driver comments led to the creation of the splitter and the wing, thus delaying implementation until 2007.

== Debut ==
On March 25, 2007, the CoT debuted in its first NASCAR-sanctioned race. Kyle Busch won the race, the first win for the Chevrolet Impala since Wendell Scott's historic race in 1963.

Reactions to the CoT's performance were mixed. Dale Earnhardt Jr., after finishing 7th, said, "It wasn't a disaster like everybody anticipated. It worked out, I reckon. Racing was about the same." Drivers were also impressed with the car's ability to bump other competitors without causing a spin (bumper heights were equalized due to street car development, and nose-to-rear bumper contact caused spins that pre-1988 cars would not cause), and NASCAR officials were pleased with the improvements in safety.

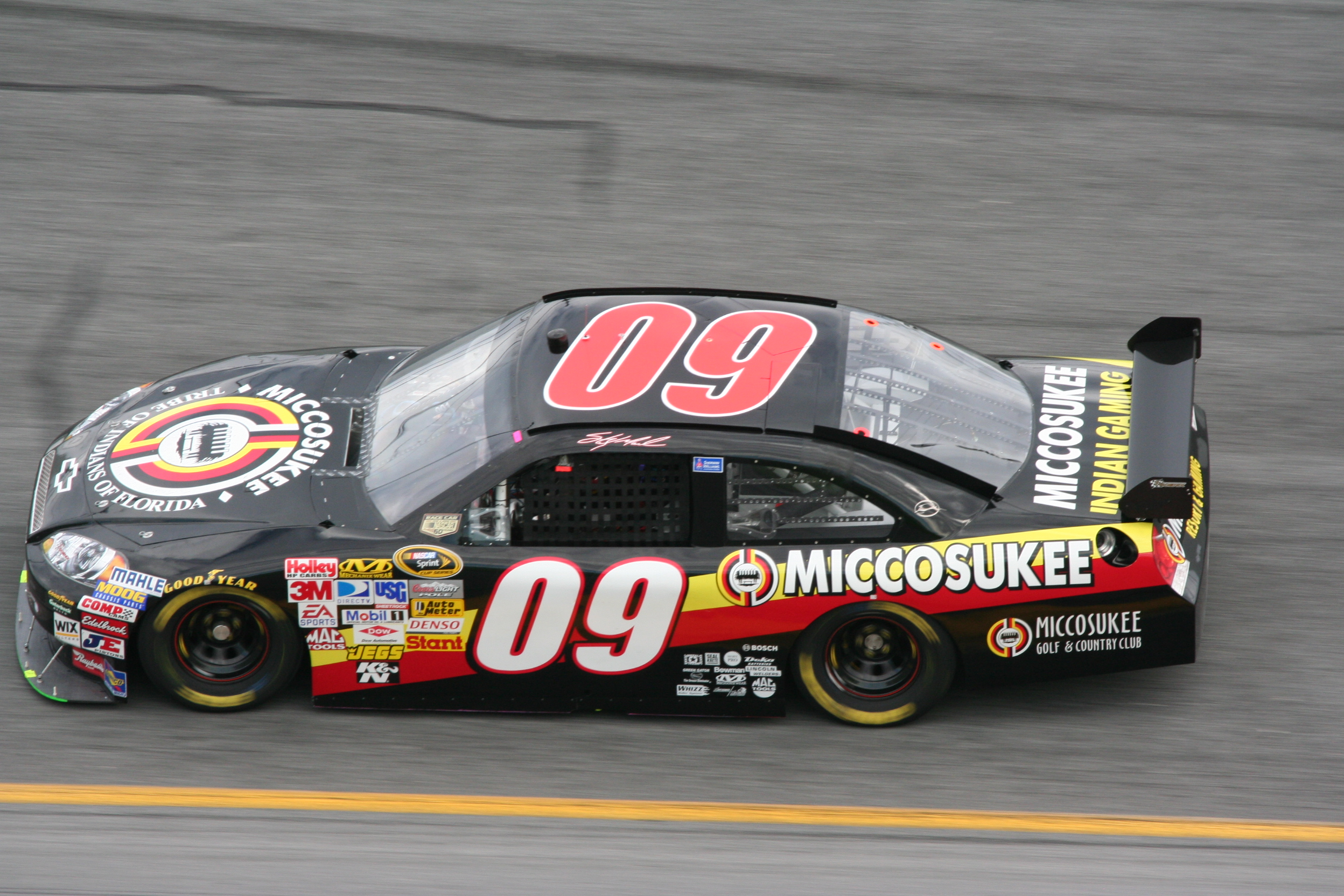
Profile view of CoT, driven by Sterling Marlin, at Daytona International Speedway

Several drivers and pundits expressed distaste for the car and what they perceived as a less exciting style of racing created by it. Kyle Busch, despite winning at Bristol, commented that "they suck" during his victory lane interview. Retired driver and TV analyst Rusty Wallace stated on ESPN that the car created a boring, single-file racing environment with little of the passing, action, or crashing that has made NASCAR popular, though after NASCAR announced the CoT would run the full schedule, he stated that it was "one of the best decisions NASCAR had ever made." Drivers who placed well at Bristol, Jeff Gordon and Jeff Burton, claimed that the car allowed the use of a second passing lane not usually present at Bristol.

A major problem with the car's initial race was its front splitter. One car's splitter running into the tire of another car beside it sometimes punctured the second car's tire. There were no problems with the splitter causing tire failure at the car's second race.

Another major problem was that the safety foam used in the side of the car would catch fire, engulfing the driver's cockpit with smoke. NASCAR decided to make modifications before the April 21 Subway Fresh Fit 500 in Avondale, Arizona. An additional side effect of the foam occurred during side-impacts, as Brian Vickers experienced at Watkins Glen, when the foam would be sheared out of the car leaving debris on the racetrack.

During the 2007 UAW-Ford 500, the CoT's debut on a superspeedway track at Talladega, NASCAR assigned a 31/32 inch (25 mm) restrictor plate to allow the engines to run at around 8,800 RPM due to the less aerodynamic design of the CoT. The previous generation car's engine would normally run around 7,000 RPM with a 7/8 inch (22 mm) plate. This was the most open restrictor plate (in terms of air flow) to race at Talladega since 1988.

== History, criticisms, and redesigns of the COT ==
=== First generation body (Generation 5) ===
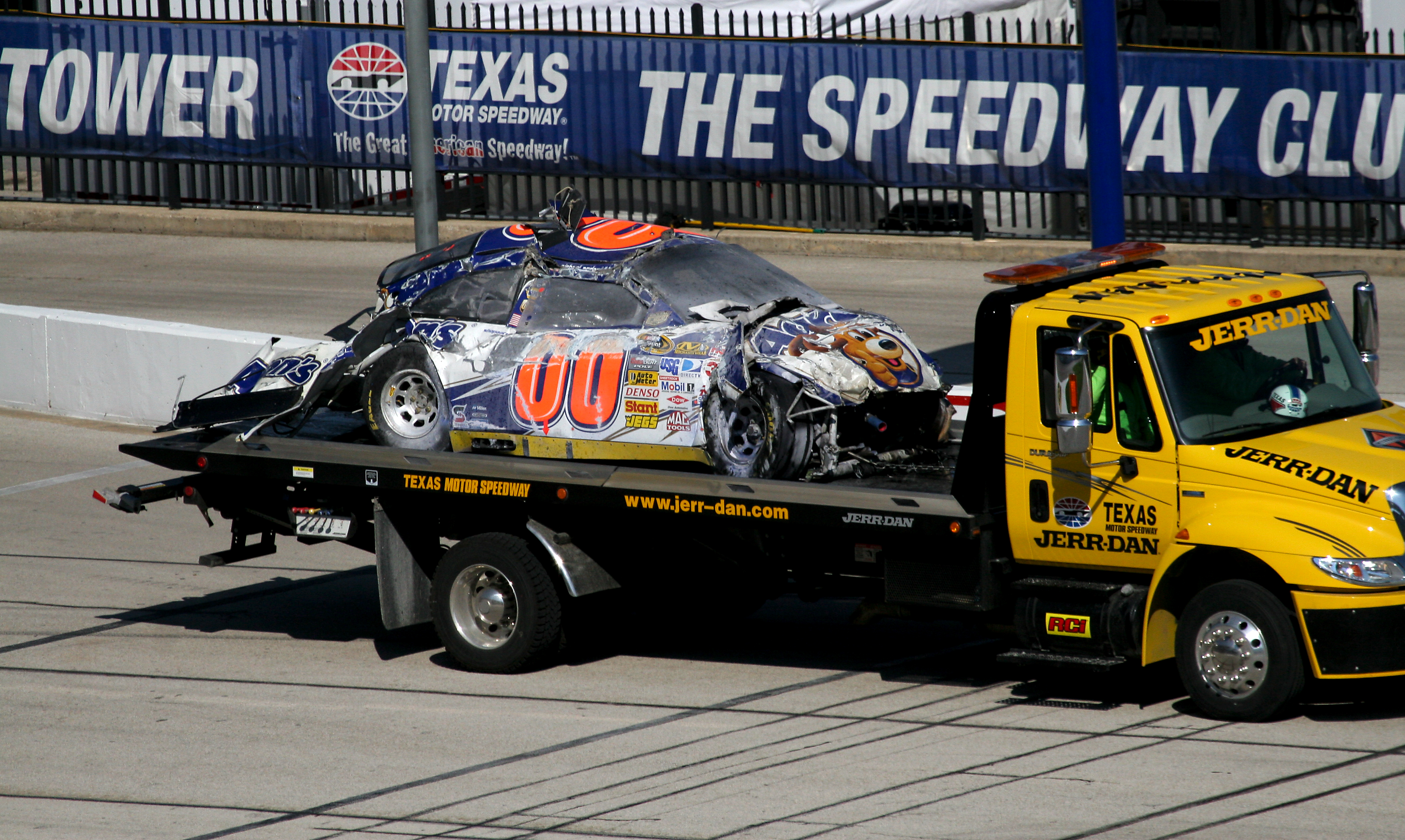
The remains of Michael McDowell's Aaron's, Inc. Toyota after his notorious qualifying crash in 2008. McDowell would walk away from the incident relatively unscathed.

Criticisms of the CoT began with its first tests, with the magazine Speedway Illustrated noting the car's poor performance in traffic (February 2006 issue). The Winston-Salem Journal also noted extensive criticism of the project during 2006 testing, with drivers becoming more vocal by July 2007 and most fans rejecting the model, citing the falsity of many of its technical claims; one angle of criticism was the differing philosophies of NASCAR officials Gary Nelson and John Darby, with Darby a particularly ardent supporter of the CoT based on a misreading of the sport's competition packages. Jeff Gordon and Matt Kenseth were pointedly critical of the car's poor performance in traffic, with Gordon stating after the 2007 New England 300, "I'd like to know who it was who said this car would reduce the aero push because I could have told you from when I first drove this car that it would be worse." Kyle Busch, who won the very first race with the car at Bristol in 2007, proclaimed that the car "sucks" afterward and expanded on this criticism at Dover in 2008 in noting how the CoT was "hitting a wall of air" in the wake of a leading car, thus neutralizing ability to close up on leaders.

On April 4, 2008, while in a qualifying run for the 2008 Samsung 500 at Texas Motor Speedway, Michael McDowell's right-front sway bar broke, causing him to lose control of his car and strike the wall outside of Turn 1 head-on at 185 MPH. McDowell's car subsequently barrel-rolled eight times as fire came from the engine compartment and came to a stop at the exit of Turn 2. McDowell emerged from the Toyota unharmed. The car, along with the SAFER barrier on the track wall, was praised for its safety, as the speed upon impact of the crash was about 30 miles an hour more than Dale Earnhardt's fatal accident.

In the 2008 Brickyard 400, the longest run under green flag conditions was 12 laps due to extreme wear on right-side tires, especially the right rear. The CoT, in its first use at Indianapolis Motor Speedway, created no improvement of the conditions on the track, which is well known for its rough surface. The lack of downforce on the car and its higher center of gravity created conditions that made it very hard on the right side tires. During the race, the tires used on the cars generally lasted no more than 10 laps at a time. Larry McReynolds has also told a story from Darrell Waltrip's viewpoint which was highly critical against Mike Helton about the Car of Tomorrow during the 2009 Coca-Cola 600.

It has been claimed that the bulky rear wing that was affixed to the rear of the car from 2007 to early 2010 increased the severity of many on-track incidents by causing cars to flip over or go airborne at high speeds.

- On the final lap of the 2009 Aaron's 499 at Talladega, leader Carl Edwards attempted to block Brad Keselowski in order to prevent Keselowski from passing; when Keselowski didn't give, Edwards was turned into the air and Edwards's car bounced off of the hood of Ryan Newman's car and flipped into the catch fence, then came to a rest in the middle of the track further down. Edwards was uninjured, but the crash was compared to an accident at Talladega in 1987 where Bobby Allison went airborne and hit the catch fence in a similar location. Allison's crash (coming at speeds 20 MPH faster than Edwards' crash) ripped out a 100-foot section of the catch fence, while Edwards' crash only bent the support poles. Seven spectators were injured in Edwards' accident from debris. The aftermath of the accident spawned questions about the aerodynamic features of the CoT, the nature of pack racing with restrictor plates, and the safety features of Talladega Superspeedway. Video replay showed that despite deploying, the car's roof flaps did nothing to stop the car from flipping – a common failing of the devices dating to their very first month in use – and the second hit from Newman flipped the car higher.
- In the 2009 AMP Energy 500 – the fall race at Talladega, Ryan Newman was spun backwards at high speed in a late race crash, and then flipped backwards (landing upside down on Kevin Harvick's hood) and ended up on his roof. Mark Martin also barrel rolled in a crash during the same race, but instead of lifting in the air like Newman, his car was hit from behind, causing the weight of the car to shift to one side and pull the car onto its roof, rolling once.
- At the 2010 Kobalt Tools 500 at Atlanta – the second to last race to use the rear wing – Carl Edwards made deliberate contact with Brad Keselowski (in retaliation for several events including the Talladega race the prior season), causing Keselowski to turn backwards and once more flip over despite the roof flaps being deployed. Keselowski flipped over once and crashed on his side door. Edwards was parked for the rest of the race and put on three-race probation.

These three accidents – as well as the general consensus that the wing made the car look like a sports car rather than a stock car – were factors in NASCAR's eventual decision, in February 2010, to replace the wing with a more traditional rear spoiler starting at Martinsville in late March. Denny Hamlin won the first race with the new/old spoiler, beating out Jeff Gordon and Matt Kenseth.

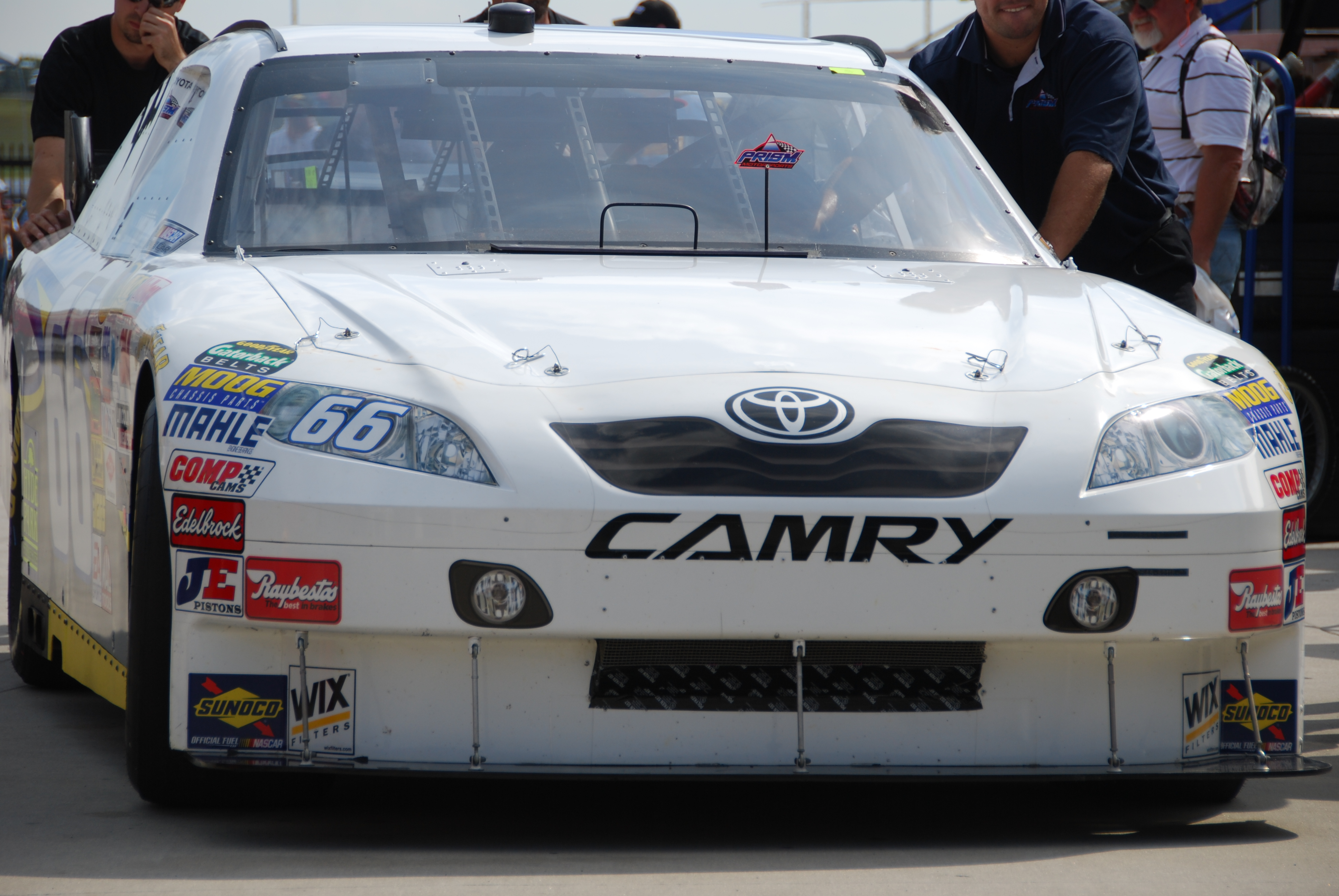
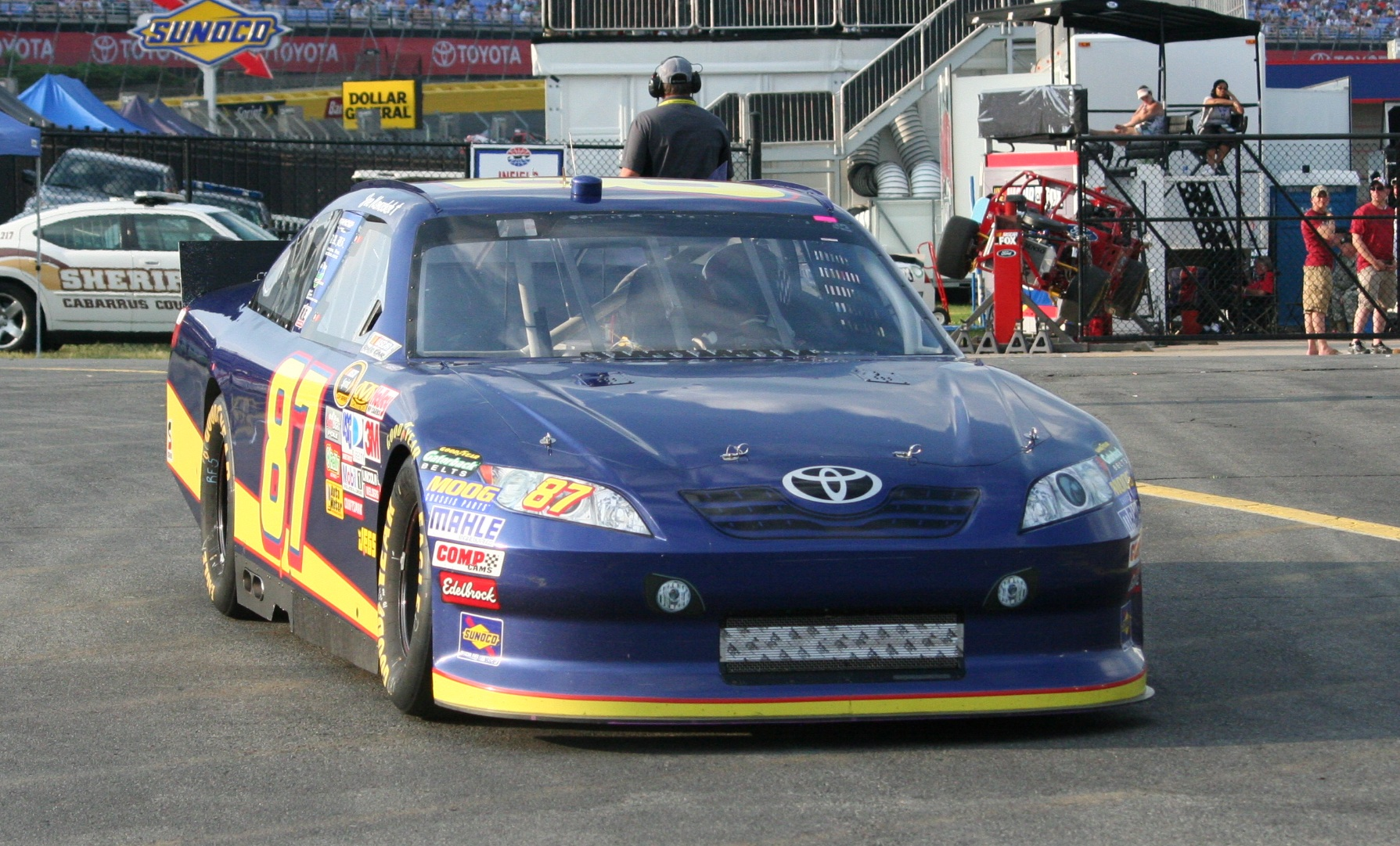
A comparison of the original and modified nose and splitter designs of the CoT

For the 2011 season, the car's splitter and nose configuration were redesigned: the splitter's braces were removed, and the splitter was made nonadjustable. The nose as a whole was given a cleaner, rounder look that resembled that of NASCAR's previous model (now dubbed the fourth-generation car) and manufacturers were given free rein to construct the lower grille area to reflect that of their NASCAR models' production-car counterparts. In the past, all cars were required to run the same exact grille arrangement, allowing for very little, if any, real differentiation between them.

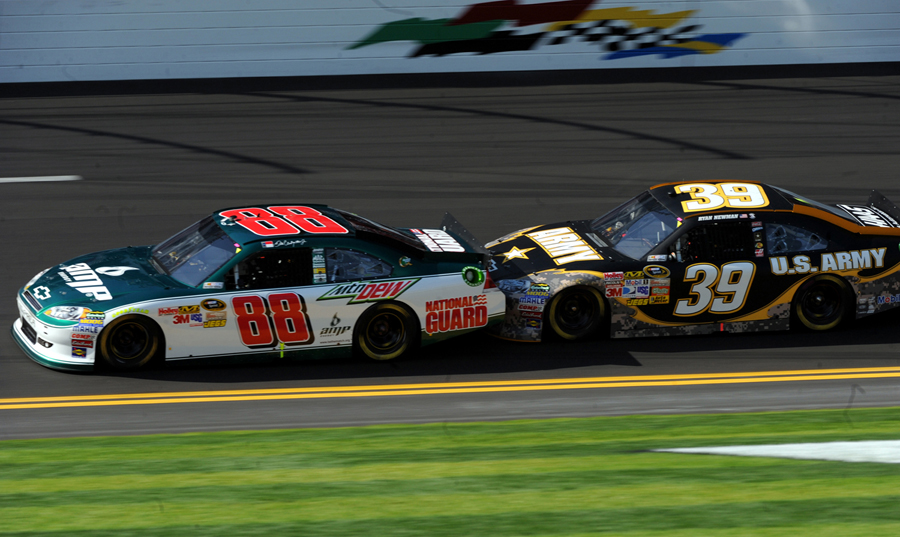
Dale Earnhardt Jr. and Ryan Newman tandem drafting in the 2011 Daytona 500

The first racing with the redesigned car was the 2011 Daytona 500 and its supporting races (Budweiser Shootout and Gatorade Duels), all held on brand new pavement for Daytona International Speedway. The Daytona 500 broke long-standing records for leaders and lead changes, as 22 drivers changed the lead 74 times. It also saw a first time winner, rookie Trevor Bayne, go to victory lane. But the story of the new car was a phenomenon of lock-bumper superdrafts – two cars would literally lock together and push into a clear lead, with speeds up to 10 MPH faster than with a conventional draft (on numerous occasions 2-car superdrafts topped 206 MPH); this phenomenon had debuted at Talladega Superspeedway in the spring of 2008 when Denny Hamlin discovered he could push Kevin Harvick all the way around the track during practice, resulting in a lap time about a half a second faster than the rest of the field. Hamlin used the move multiple times in that race to get the lead, and by the next spring the technique was used by the majority of the field throughout the entire race. The phenomenon also led to a new level of "team" racing reminiscent of the team orders ethos common to Formula One; drivers would communicate with each other over radio to coordinate "swaps" instead of actually fighting for position. This was present in the 2011 Aaron's 499 at Talladega, leading to a three-wide finish with three drafting teams contending for the win: Clint Bowyer (pushed by Kevin Harvick), Jeff Gordon (who was being pushed by Mark Martin, but separated before the finish line), and winner Jimmie Johnson (pushed by Dale Earnhardt Jr.), who won by two-thousandths of a second over Bowyer. A fourth drafting team, consisting of Roush-Fenway teammates Carl Edwards and Greg Biffle (Biffle was pushing), squeezed in between the Bowyer/Harvick tandem and the wall, but only finishing 6th (Edwards) and 7th (Biffle).

Dale Earnhardt Jr. and veteran drivers such as Richard Petty and David Pearson were sharply critical of this new style of racing, especially in the wake of a race-record sixteen caution flags, most of them for crashes caused when pushing cars spun out leaders; Earnhardt Jr. himself crashed during an attempt at a green-white-checker finish in the 500.

To dissuade the two-car tandem and return to pack racing, a new superspeedway package was introduced for the 2012 season, including a curved spoiler and a lower and longer rear bumper. The tandem remained prevalent in the Nationwide Series until 2014, when pushing was prohibited after a massive crash at the end of the 2013 DRIVE4COPD 300, in which 28 spectators were injured by flying debris off of Kyle Larson's airborne car. In the same year, fuel injection replaced the carburetor as the fuel distribution system.

In spite of strong criticisms of the CoT's handling characteristics and the racing styles it created, it also produced one of the most competitive periods of time in NASCAR history. the first four CoT races in 2007 produced more "quality passes" (a pass of a top-15 car under green-flag conditions) than their 2006 counterparts. From 2007 to 2012, 28 different drivers scored a victory (in 196 races), including several first-time winners.

Following the elimination of the CoT in 2013, NASCAR Chairman and CEO Brian France identified the model as his biggest failure as the head of the sport due to the lack of manufacturer identity.

=== Second generation body (Generation 6) ===
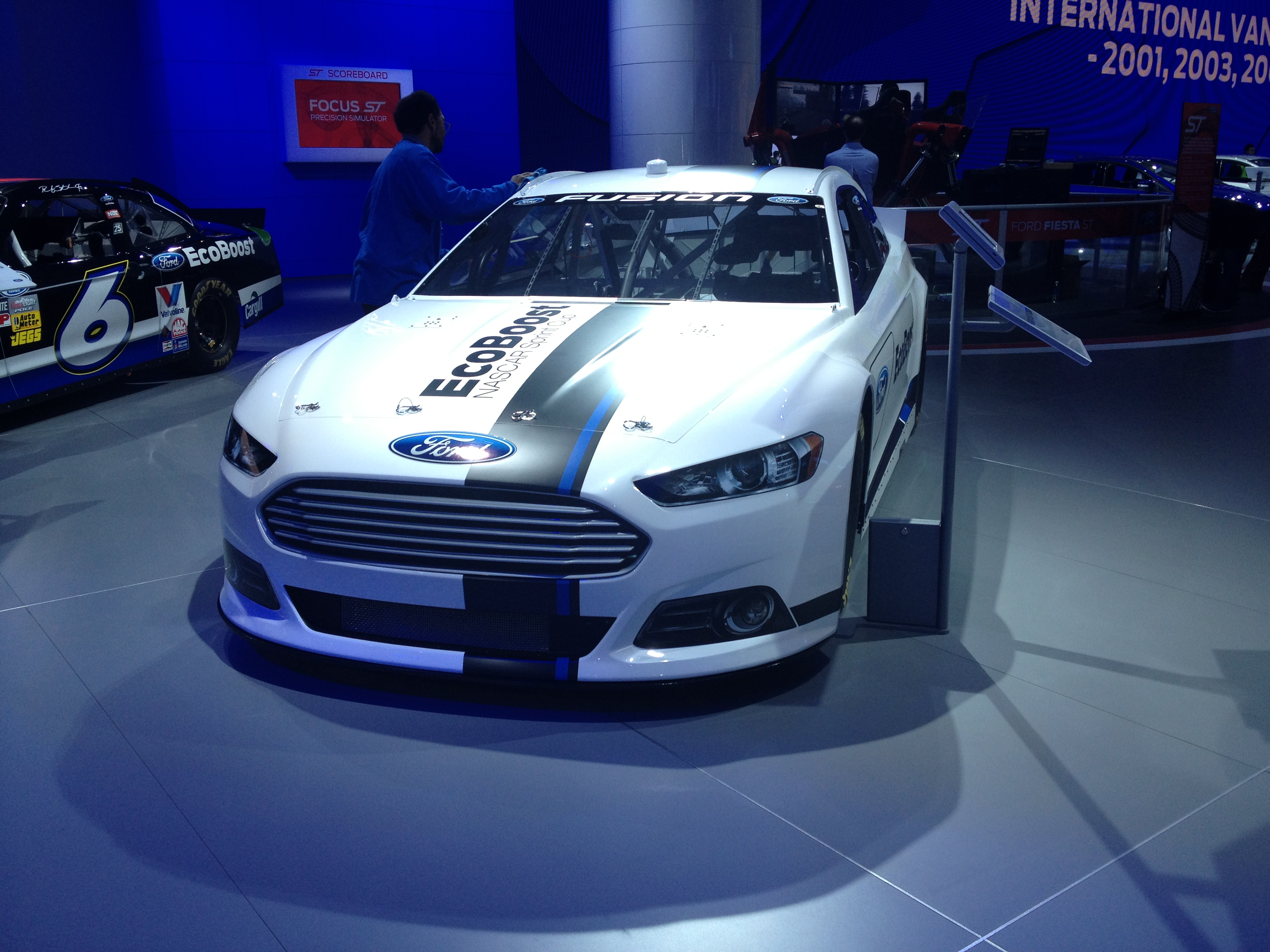
The 2013 Ford Fusion

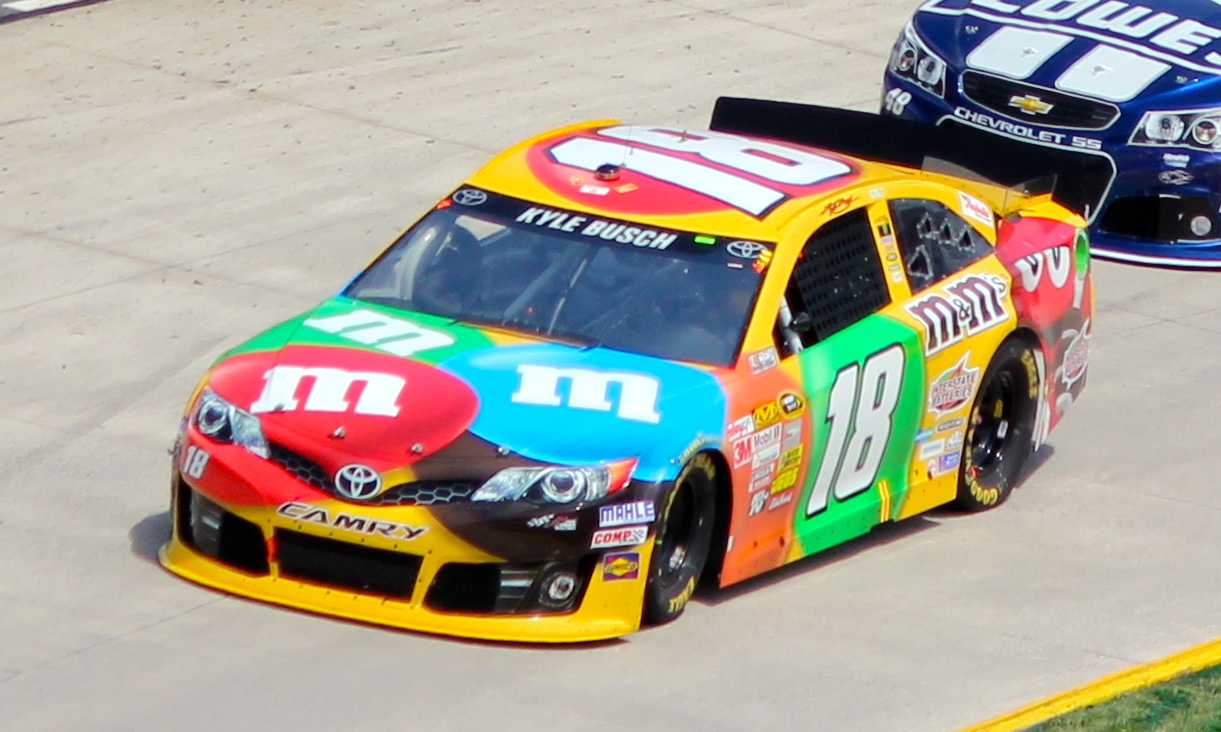
A 2013 Toyota Camry driven by Kyle Busch at Martinsville Speedway

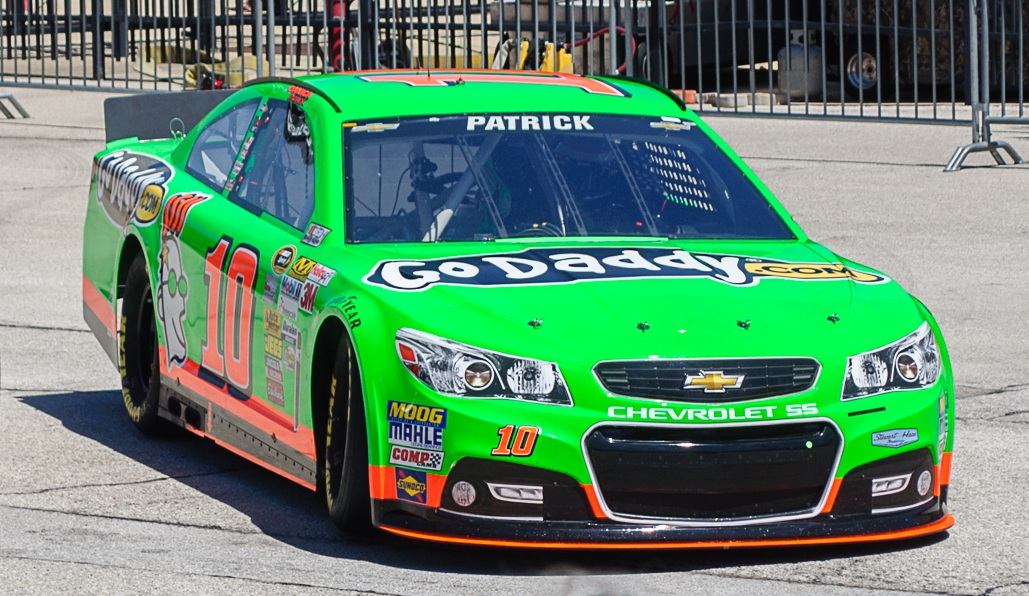
Danica Patrick in a 2013 Chevrolet SS at Texas Motor Speedway

For 2013, NASCAR allowed manufacturers to design a brand-new body style for the COT chassis that resembled a given production car even more. The changes were largely cosmetic, with hopes of returning mechanical grip to drivers. At the 2012 Ford Championship Weekend the body of the car made it the Gen 6 car by NASCAR. During the 2012 season, it was announced that Ford would use the Mk.V Ford Mondeo, known as the Fusion in the Americas, Toyota would continue to use the 2013 Camry, while the Holden VF Commodore, rebadged in North America as the Chevrolet Super Sport (SS), replaced the Chevrolet Impala and Dodge announced they would use the Charger. However, soon after, Dodge announced their withdrawal from the sport, after being unable to convince other teams to switch to Dodge to replace Penske Racing (which returned to Ford).

Key among the changes for the car included a carbon fibre hood and decklid, shaving 160 pounds from Cup cars, and new improved safety bars added to the roll cage. The roof flaps were increased in size to prevent the airborne accidents that marked the CoT's early life.

This new "Generation 6" racecar debuted at the 2013 Daytona 500 and its supporting races. The testing and design of the car began in May 2010 and involved an unusual level of cooperation between the manufacturers (Chevrolet, Ford, and Toyota) involved. The 500 and subsequent race at Phoenix Raceway, however, caused controversy, as passing was limited and drivers such as Brad Keselowski and Denny Hamlin were critical of the car's ability to pass; the controversy was exacerbated when NASCAR fined Hamlin $25,000 over his comments. The view was also expressed that the car's slow development time and lack of available parts made drivers reluctant to take chances, with improvement expected with more time invested into the car.

The Generation 6 car was succeeded by the Next Gen car in 2022.

=== NASCAR Xfinity Series ===
The Nationwide Series (now Xfinity Series) debuted its own version of the CoT in July 2010 at Daytona International Speedway, running four races that season before fully implementing the car in 2011. The Xfinity car used the same chassis as the Cup Series, but featured an extended wheelbase of 110 inches (280 cm). The second-tier series also utilizes different body style, primarily marketing American pony cars such as the Ford Mustang.

=== NASCAR K&N Pro Series/ARCA Menards Series ===
In 2015, NASCAR's regional series, the then-K&N Pro Series East and West along with the ARCA Racing Series (which NASCAR purchased in 2018, followed with rebranding of the East and West Series under the ARCA banner in 2020), the final series to still use the Generation 4 style body, introduced a new body style based on the Generation 6 Cup Series cars. Unlike the Generation 6 cars, the K&N Pro Series/ARCA car continues to use a front valence instead of a splitter. Again, three bodies are available—the Camry, Commodore/SS, and Fusion; these cars continue to use be based on their 2013-spec body styles even with changes to their Cup Series counterparts. In 2022, a Ford Mustang bodystyle (based on the 2021 Generation 6 body) also became available.

== Models ==
=== Cup Series ===
| Manufacturer | Chassis | Usage | Image |
|---|---|---|---|
| Chevrolet | Impala | 2010 - 2012 | |
| Chevrolet | Impala SS | 2007 - 2009 | |
| Dodge | Avenger | 2007 | |
| Dodge | Charger | 2008 - 2012 | |
| Ford | Fusion | 2007- 2012 | |
| Toyota | Camry | 2007 - 2012 | |

== See also ==
- Cup Series cars
