= Template (auto racing) =

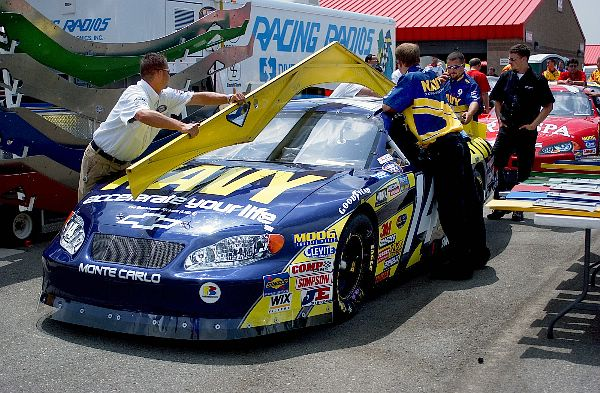
NASCAR officials are using a template to inspect Casey Atwood's 2004 Busch Series car

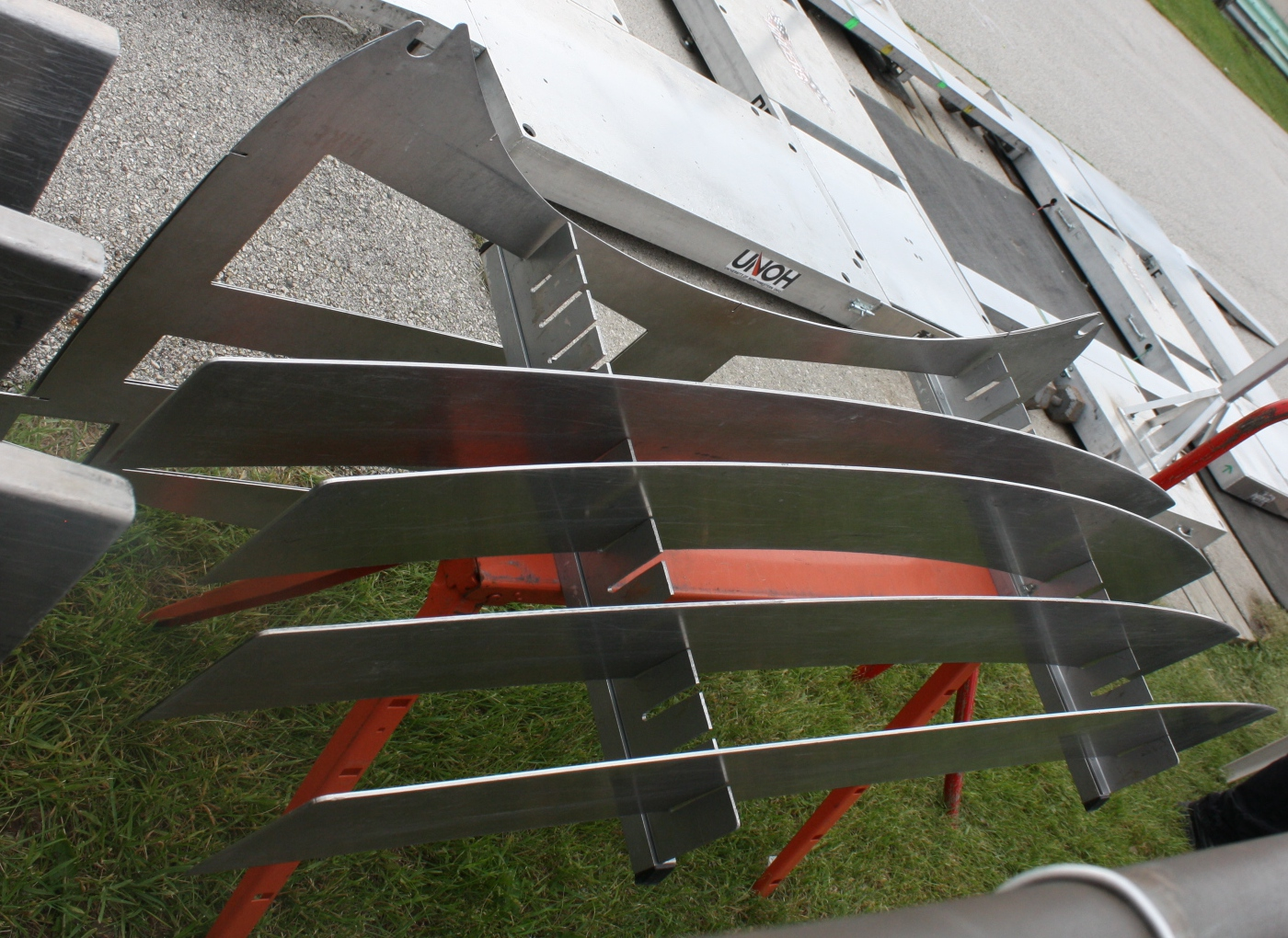
A series of templates for ARCA stock cars

A template is a device used by sanctioning body officials to check the body shape and height of racing vehicles. The template is used to check that teams have manufactured the sheet metal used in the vehicle bodies to within tight tolerances (up to thousandths of an inch).

== NASCAR use ==
NASCAR cars are checked before qualifying, before racing, sometimes after a race.

The process of checking car body against templates changed significantly with the Car of Tomorrow (CoT). Before the change, there were different templates applied to each car model to make sure it resembled the factory version of the car. The differing templates frequently caused NASCAR to adjust the templates to ensure that all makes of cars were as aerodynamically equal as possible (called "parity"). There were at least 30 templates used.

All Car of Tomorrow models utilized the same templates, since the CoT is designed to not resemble a specific street car. All makes of cars have the same specifications for their bodies. Instead of a series of templates, a single one-piece template is mounted to the frame by NASCAR officials. With the transition to the Generation 6 car in 2013, which re-allowed for uniqueness of body designs, manufacturer-specific templates returned until 2018, when physical templates was replaced by the laser-based Optical Scanning System (OSS).
