= Roof flap =

Safety feature on race cars

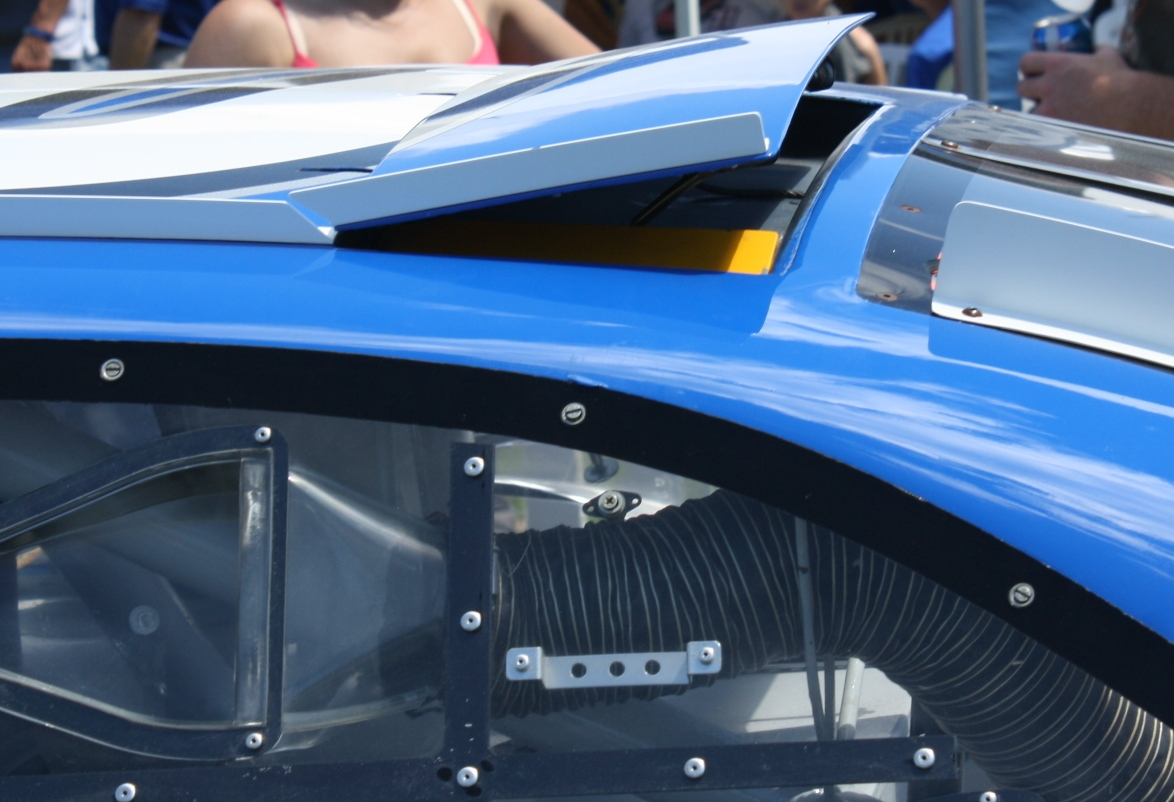
NASCAR racecar's roof flap

A roof flap is an aerodynamic feature on race cars, mainly stock cars, which functions as an emergency spoiler to prevent the vehicle from lifting off the ground. The flaps are stowed during normal vehicle operation; however, in certain situations, e.g., if the vehicle goes into a spin, particularly if it is facing backwards, the flaps deploy to disrupt the air flow over the roof and reduce the lift force on the vehicle.

Roof flaps were first required in 1994. NASCAR now mandates that cars in the Cup and O'Reilly series have two roof flaps positioned near the rear of the vehicle, with the left flap oriented perpendicular to the length of the car and the right flap angled 45° counter-clockwise (when looking downward) from the left flap. Trucks in the Craftsman Truck Series only have the angled flap, due to the smaller roof area of the pickup truck type greenhouse and lower overall lift potential of the body shape.

Originally, the flaps each measured 12 inches (30 cm) wide by 8 inches (20 cm) tall. Following several incidents where cars became airborne in Sprint Cup races in preceding years, NASCAR mandated new, larger flaps to increase their effectiveness, introduced with the "Car of Tomorrow" fifth generation body style in 2007. Flap specs were enlarged again for the "Generation 6" body styles which debuted in 2013. For the 2013 season, the flaps measured 10.25 inches (26.0 cm) tall by 24.7 inches (63 cm) tall on the left side, and 10.125 inches (25.72 cm) by 33.5 inches (85 cm) on the right. The new flaps are designed to deploy more quickly than the previous design, and include canvas "parachutes" on their underside to further disrupt airflow when deployed. Additionally, to further curb blowovers, NASCAR mandated additional flaps located at the vehicle's A-post in the Cup Series in 2026, after a trial at the 2025 Coke Zero Sugar 400.

A race car's body is designed to optimize downforce, but if that body is spun so air is flowing in reverse, lift is generated instead of countered. The roof flaps' job is to disrupt that airflow and prevent lift.

The decision to implement a safety device to keep cars on the ground came after two crashes in 1993. In the first, Rusty Wallace barrel-rolled through the infield of Talladega Superspeedway in 1993 after being tagged by Dale Earnhardt exiting the tri-oval. Wallace's car spun backwards, and lifted off the ground. The car landed in a grassy area of the track and his car tumbled violently down the front stretch. In August of that same year, Johnny Benson Jr. spun off turn two at Michigan International Speedway and flipped down the backstretch.

NASCAR tested a restrictor plate at Charlotte Motor Speedway that September but driver lobbying led to development of the roof flaps. "We developed them so NASCAR would not slow the cars down more," said the devices' primary engineer, Jack Roush.

Following Matt Crafton's flip while racing for the win in the NextEra Energy 250 at Daytona International Speedway in 2017, NASCAR developed flaps that are located on the bed cover of the trucks used in their Craftsman Truck Series, meant to keep the trucks from getting airborne due to their tendency to do so despite the angled flap on their roofs. These flaps are designed to deploy as the truck goes around, venting the air through the bed cover, which often acted as a parachute before. However, upon introduction at Talladega Superspeedway that fall, it was found that the center flap would often deploy on track as the trucks qualified or raced. This was likely due to the positioning of the flap, being close to the rear windshield on the trucks. The pocket of low pressure caused by turbulence of the air coming around the trucks' cabs is likely what caused it to deploy. This resulted in stunted qualifying runs and the inability to keep the trucks grouped in packs during racing as a result of how vastly it changed the flow of air around the trucks. They did prove effective in their purpose later in the race when Cody Coughlin wrecked with others during the Talladega race, when his truck threatened to go airborne upon turning backwards, but set back down, although on top of another truck in the process.
