= Chevrolet R07 =

- A R07 on display in June 2014 at Road America

Overview
- Manufacturer: Chevrolet; Hendrick Racing Engines; ECR Engines
- Production: 2007–present

Layout
- Configuration: V8 engine, 90° cylinder angle
- Displacement: 5.9 L (5,870 cc)
- Cylinder bore: 106.3 mm (4.2 in)
- Piston stroke: 82.55 mm (3 in)
- Cylinder block material: Compacted graphite iron
- Cylinder head material: Aluminum alloy
- Valvetrain: 16-valve, OHV, two-valves per cylinder

Combustion
- Fuel system: Electronic Port Fuel Injection (EFI) (Cup); Carburetor (O'Reilly)
- Management: MES TAG-400i
- Fuel type: 260 GTX Unleaded provided by Sunoco (2007–2010; still in use in ARCA); E15 Ethanol provided by Sunoco (2011–present)
- Oil system: Dry sump

Output
- Power output: 550-950+ hp (410-708 kW) @ 9,000 rpm (depending on displacement.)
- Torque output: Approx. 510 lb⋅ft (691 N⋅m) @ 4,900 rpm

Dimensions
- Dry weight: 525 lb (238 kg)

Chronology
- Predecessor: Chevrolet SB2 (1998–2006)

The Chevrolet R07 engine is a 5.87-liter, naturally aspirated, V8 racing engine, developed and produced by Chevrolet for NASCAR competition in 2007. Chevrolet has been a highly successful NASCAR engine supplier, scoring 886 Cup Series wins, 582 O'Reilly Series wins, and 298 Truck Series wins, leading the all-time wins as a manufacturer in all 3 series. As of 2026, across the top 2 series, they supply engines to nearly 30 different teams, with notable examples including Hendrick Motorsports, Richard Childress Racing, Spire Motorsports, Trackhouse Racing, and JR Motorsports.

== Specifications ==
- Engine type: Chevrolet V8
- Capacity: 5.87 L (358 cu in)
- HP rating (superspeedway / intermediate / dirt / road-street course / short tracks): 670 hp (500 kW) / 750 hp (559 kW) (2026 rules package)
- Max. RPM: 10,500 rpm
- Weight: 525 lbs. (238 kg)
- Oil system: Dry-sump lubrication
- Camshafts: Solid-roller camshaft
- Valve actuation: Shaft-mounted
- Valve springs: Wire-type
- Cylinder head: 2 valves (titanium) per cylinder
- Fuel injection: MES/NXP Semiconductors/Holley/Bosch 8x high pressure port injectors
- Fuel: 260 GTX Unleaded provided by Sunoco (2007–2010; still in use in ARCA)
  E15 Ethanol provided by Sunoco (2011–present)
- Lubricants: 0w grade; Mobil 1 Extended Performance (ESP), Pennzoil Platinum, Valvoline Advanced Protection
- Block material: Compacted graphite iron
- Head material: Aluminum alloy
- Crankshaft: Billet steel
- Con rods: Forged steel
- Pistons: Forged aluminum alloy
- Intake systems: Single plenum - aluminum
- Electronic control unit: McLaren Electronics - TAG-400I
- Engine service life: 1,000 miles
- Gearbox: Sequential gearbox, h-pattern

=== Applications ===
- Next Gen Car (2022–present)
- Gen 6 (2013—2021)
- Car of Tomorrow (2007—2012)
- Gen 4 (2007)
- NASCAR O'Reilly Auto Parts Series (2007—present)
- NASCAR Craftsman Truck Series (2007–2018)
