= 2022 Daytona 500 =

64th Running of the event, held in Daytona Beach, Florida

Race details
- Race 1 of 36 in the 2022 NASCAR Cup Series
- Date: February 20, 2022
- Location: Daytona International Speedway in Daytona Beach, Florida
- Course: Permanent racing facility 2.5 mi (4 km)
- Distance: 201 laps, 502.5 mi (804 km)
- Scheduled distance: 200 laps, 500 mi (800 km)
- Average speed: 142.295 miles per hour (229.002 km/h)

Pole position
Driver	Kyle Larson	Hendrick Motorsports
- Time: 49.680

Qualifying race winners
Duel 1 Winner	Brad Keselowski	RFK Racing
Duel 2 Winner	Chris Buescher	RFK Racing

Most laps led
Driver	Brad Keselowski	RFK Racing
- Laps: 67

Winner
No. 2	Austin Cindric	Team Penske

Television in the United States
- Network: Fox
- Announcers: Mike Joy, Clint Bowyer, and Tony Stewart
- Nielsen ratings: 4.7, 8.868 Million viewers

Radio in the United States
- Radio: MRN
- Booth announcers: Alex Hayden, Jeff Striegle, and Rusty Wallace
- Turn announcers: Dave Moody (1 & 2), Mike Bagley (Backstretch), and Kyle Rickey (3 & 4)

The 2022 Daytona 500 was the first stock car race of the 2022 NASCAR Cup Series and the 64th running of the event. The race was held on Sunday, February 20, 2022, in Daytona Beach, Florida at Daytona International Speedway, a 2.5-mile (4.0 km) asphalt superspeedway. In a green-white-checker finish, rookie Austin Cindric, driving for Team Penske, led 21 of the final 45 laps and held off challenges from teammate Ryan Blaney, RFK Racing's Brad Keselowski and eventual second-place finisher Bubba Wallace of 23XI Racing to win his first career NASCAR Cup Series race. Chase Briscoe of Stewart-Haas Racing finished third. Team Penske dedicated their Daytona 500 win to legendary sportscaster Bob Jenkins after the race. Jenkins used to broadcast NASCAR Races on ESPN from 1981 to 2000.

This race marked the season debut of the Next Gen car, which replaced the previous Gen-6 Car.

== Report ==
The 2022 Daytona 500 program cover.

Daytona International Speedway is a race track in Daytona Beach, Florida that is one of six superspeedways, the others being Auto Club Speedway, Pocono Raceway, Indianapolis Motor Speedway, Michigan International Speedway, and Talladega Superspeedway.

=== Background ===
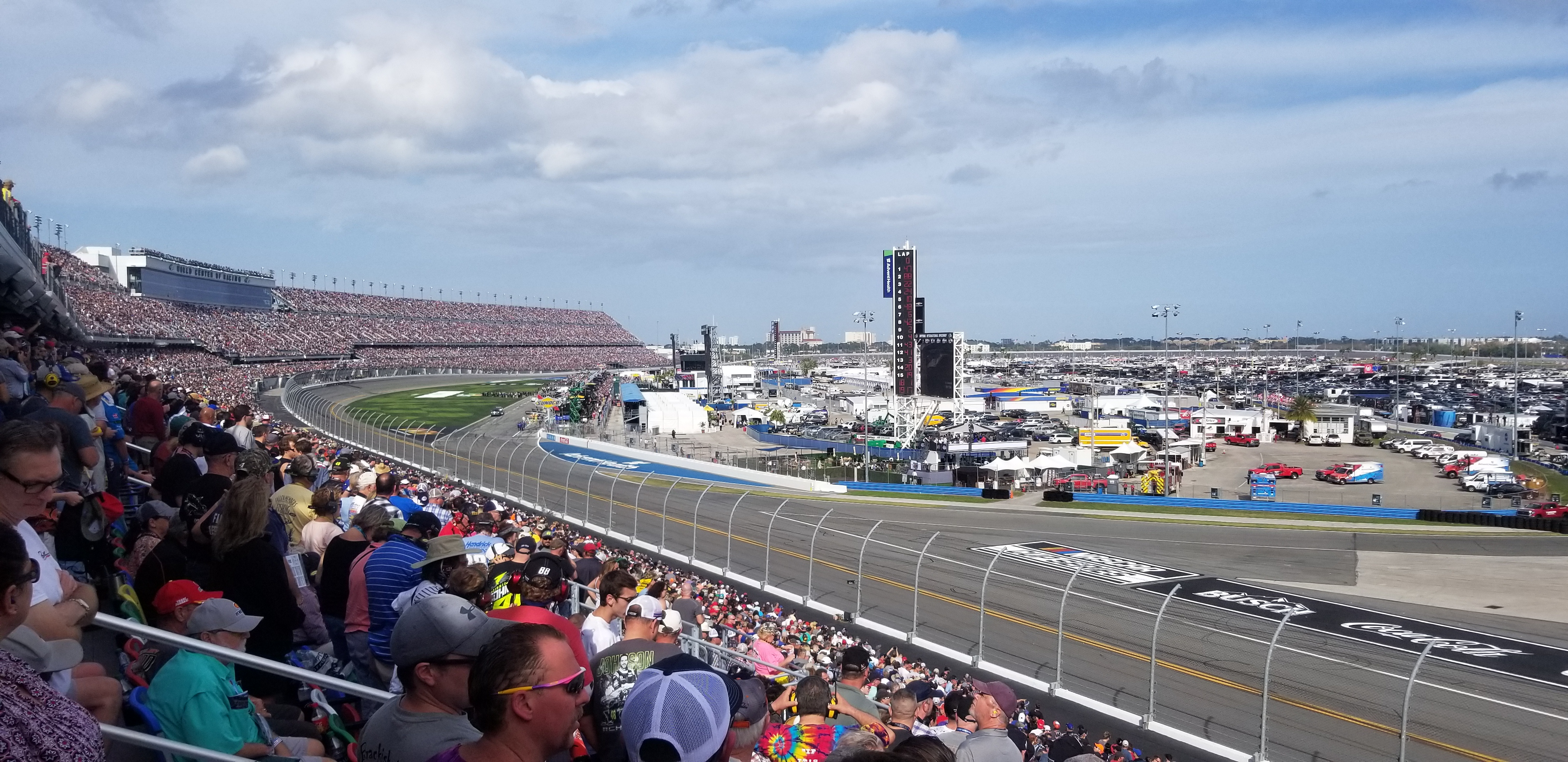
Daytona International Speedway, the circuit where the 64th annual Daytona 500 took place.

Daytona International Speedway is one of three superspeedways to hold NASCAR races, the other two being Indianapolis Motor Speedway and Talladega Superspeedway. The standard track at Daytona International Speedway is a four-turn superspeedway that is 2.5 miles (4.0 km) long. The track's turns are banked at 31 degrees, while the front stretch, the location of the finish line, is banked at 18 degrees.

Due to shortage issues surrounding the new Next Gen car, it was planned that the team that won the race would retain their car for the rest of the season, with NASCAR instead scanning the winner's car and place an identical paint scheme wrap (complete with Victory Lane confetti) on a prototype that would be shown at the Motorsports Hall of Fame of America, with the tradition of the exact winner's car being displayed at the Hall of Fame (formerly the Daytona 500 Experience) for a year being scheduled to continue in 2023. However, it was later announced on March 8 that Austin Cindric's exact winning car would be displayed at the Hall of Fame.

This was the first Daytona 500 without 2008 winner Ryan Newman since 2001. This was the first Daytona 500 for The Money Team Racing and Team Hezeberg. This was also the first Daytona 500 since 2016 to feature Greg Biffle, and the first Daytona 500 ever to feature Jacques Villeneuve. (Villeneuve previously failed to qualify for the event in 2008.)

==== Entry list ====
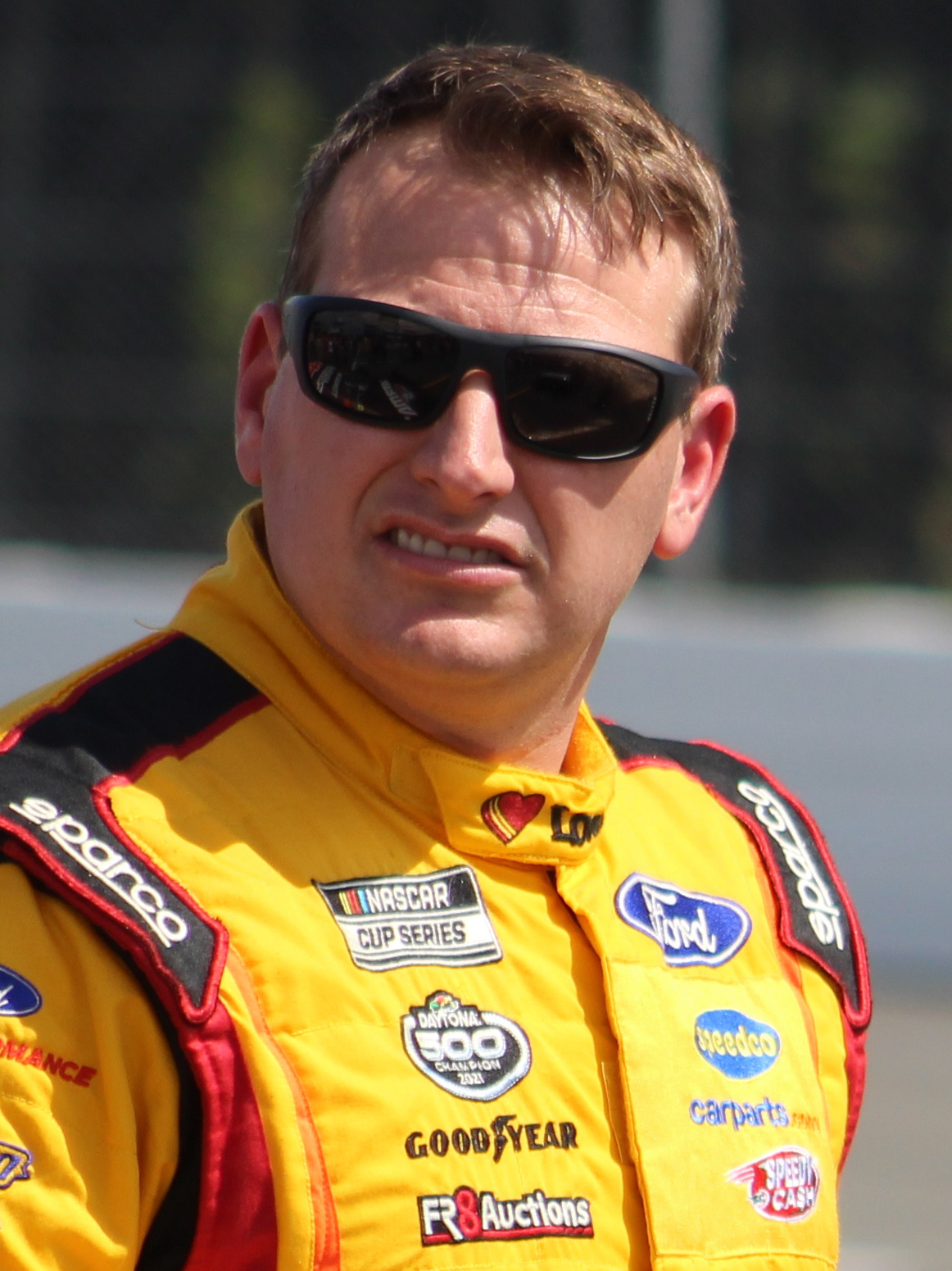
Michael McDowell, the defending race winner.

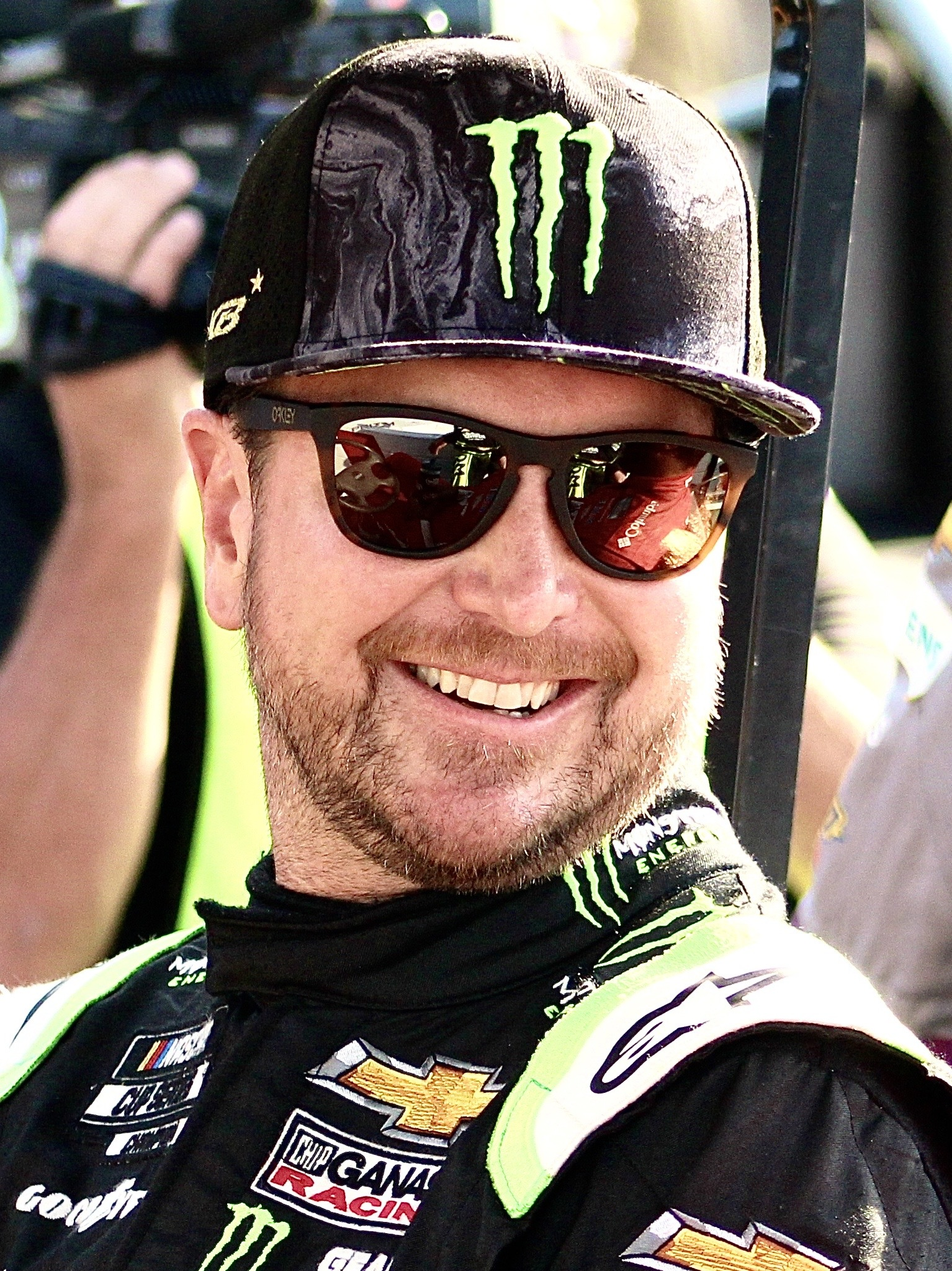
Kurt Busch, the 2017 winner, had the most prior starts of the field at 21.

- (W) denotes past 500 winner.
- (R) denotes rookie driver.
- (i) denotes driver who is ineligible for series driver points.

No.	Driver	Team	Manufacturer
1	Ross Chastain	Trackhouse Racing Team	Chevrolet
2	Austin Cindric (R)	Team Penske	Ford
3	Austin Dillon (W)	Richard Childress Racing	Chevrolet
4	Kevin Harvick (W)	Stewart-Haas Racing	Ford
5	Kyle Larson	Hendrick Motorsports	Chevrolet
6	Brad Keselowski	RFK Racing	Ford
7	Corey LaJoie	Spire Motorsports	Chevrolet
8	Tyler Reddick	Richard Childress Racing	Chevrolet
9	Chase Elliott	Hendrick Motorsports	Chevrolet
10	Aric Almirola	Stewart-Haas Racing	Ford
11	Denny Hamlin (W)	Joe Gibbs Racing	Toyota
12	Ryan Blaney	Team Penske	Ford
14	Chase Briscoe	Stewart-Haas Racing	Ford
15	David Ragan	Rick Ware Racing	Ford
16	Daniel Hemric (i)	Kaulig Racing	Chevrolet
17	Chris Buescher	RFK Racing	Ford
18	Kyle Busch	Joe Gibbs Racing	Toyota
19	Martin Truex Jr.	Joe Gibbs Racing	Toyota
20	Christopher Bell	Joe Gibbs Racing	Toyota
21	Harrison Burton (R)	Wood Brothers Racing	Ford
22	Joey Logano (W)	Team Penske	Ford
23	Bubba Wallace	23XI Racing	Toyota
24	William Byron	Hendrick Motorsports	Chevrolet
27	Jacques Villeneuve	Team Hezeberg Powered by Reaume Brothers Racing	Ford
31	Justin Haley	Kaulig Racing	Chevrolet
34	Michael McDowell (W)	Front Row Motorsports	Ford
38	Todd Gilliland (R)	Front Row Motorsports	Ford
41	Cole Custer	Stewart-Haas Racing	Ford
42	Ty Dillon	Petty GMS Motorsports	Chevrolet
43	Erik Jones	Petty GMS Motorsports	Chevrolet
44	Greg Biffle (i)	NY Racing Team	Chevrolet
45	Kurt Busch (W)	23XI Racing	Toyota
47	Ricky Stenhouse Jr.	JTG Daugherty Racing	Chevrolet
48	Alex Bowman	Hendrick Motorsports	Chevrolet
50	Kaz Grala (i)	The Money Team Racing	Chevrolet
51	Cody Ware	Rick Ware Racing	Ford
55	J. J. Yeley (i)	MBM Motorsports	Ford
62	Noah Gragson (i)	Beard Motorsports	Chevrolet
66	Timmy Hill (i)	MBM Motorsports	Ford
77	Landon Cassill (i)	Spire Motorsports	Chevrolet
78	B. J. McLeod	Live Fast Motorsports	Ford
99	Daniel Suárez	Trackhouse Racing Team	Chevrolet
Official entry list

== Practice ==
=== First practice (February 15) ===
Michael McDowell was the fastest in the first practice session with a time of 46.696 seconds and a speed of 192.736 mph (310.179 km/h).

Pos	No.	Driver	Team	Manufacturer	Time	Speed
1	34	Michael McDowell	Front Row Motorsports	Ford	46.696	192.736
2	15	David Ragan	Rick Ware Racing	Ford	46.713	192.666
3	38	Todd Gilliland (R)	Front Row Motorsports	Ford	47.717	192.649
Official first practice results

=== Second practice (February 15) ===
Ryan Blaney was the fastest in the second practice session with a time of 46.732 seconds and a speed of 192.588 mph (309.940 km/h).

Pos	No.	Driver	Team	Manufacturer	Time	Speed
1	12	Ryan Blaney	Team Penske	Ford	46.732	192.588
2	22	Joey Logano	Team Penske	Ford	46.842	192.135
3	41	Cole Custer	Stewart-Haas Racing	Ford	47.095	191.103
Official second practice results

== Qualifying ==
Kyle Larson scored the pole for the race with a time of 49.680 and a speed of 181.159 mph (291.547 km/h).

=== Qualifying results ===
Pos	No.	Driver	Team	Manufacturer	R1	R2
1	5	Kyle Larson	Hendrick Motorsports	Chevrolet	49.789	49.680
2	48	Alex Bowman	Hendrick Motorsports	Chevrolet	49.870	49.711
3	24	William Byron	Hendrick Motorsports	Chevrolet	49.765	49.765
4	10	Aric Almirola	Stewart-Haas Racing	Ford	49.946	49.854
5	9	Chase Elliott	Hendrick Motorsports	Chevrolet	49.927	49.913
6	19	Martin Truex Jr.	Joe Gibbs Racing	Toyota	50.078	49.989
7	1	Ross Chastain	Trackhouse Racing Team	Chevrolet	50.051	50.043
8	11	Denny Hamlin	Joe Gibbs Racing	Toyota	50.152	50.077
9	99	Daniel Suárez	Trackhouse Racing Team	Chevrolet	50.157	50.106
10	21	Harrison Burton (R)	Wood Brothers Racing	Ford	50.139	50.137
11	16	Daniel Hemric (i)	Kaulig Racing	Chevrolet	50.159	—
12	22	Joey Logano	Team Penske	Ford	50.160	—
13	12	Ryan Blaney	Team Penske	Ford	50.162	—
14	20	Christopher Bell	Joe Gibbs Racing	Toyota	50.187	—
15	8	Tyler Reddick	Richard Childress Racing	Chevrolet	50.191	—
16	23	Bubba Wallace	23XI Racing	Toyota	50.196	—
17	6	Brad Keselowski	RFK Racing	Ford	50.196	—
18	18	Kyle Busch	Joe Gibbs Racing	Toyota	50.202	—
19	14	Chase Briscoe	Stewart-Haas Racing	Ford	50.203	—
20	3	Austin Dillon	Richard Childress Racing	Chevrolet	50.204	—
21	2	Austin Cindric (R)	Team Penske	Ford	50.205	—
22	34	Michael McDowell	Front Row Motorsports	Ford	50.209	—
23	43	Erik Jones	Petty GMS Motorsports	Chevrolet	50.218	—
24	42	Ty Dillon	Petty GMS Motorsports	Chevrolet	50.225	—
25	45	Kurt Busch	23XI Racing	Toyota	50.285	—
26	4	Kevin Harvick	Stewart-Haas Racing	Ford	50.312	—
27	31	Justin Haley	Kaulig Racing	Chevrolet	50.315	—
28	17	Chris Buescher	RFK Racing	Ford	50.378	—
29	41	Cole Custer	Stewart-Haas Racing	Ford	50.539	—
30	7	Corey LaJoie	Spire Motorsports	Chevrolet	50.550	—
31	38	Todd Gilliland (R)	Front Row Motorsports	Ford	50.559	—
32	47	Ricky Stenhouse Jr.	JTG Daugherty Racing	Chevrolet	50.639	—
33	62	Noah Gragson (i)	Beard Motorsports	Chevrolet	50.689	—
34	77	Landon Cassill (i)	Spire Motorsports	Chevrolet	50.884	—
35	51	Cody Ware	Rick Ware Racing	Ford	50.928	—
36	27	Jacques Villeneuve	Team Hezeberg Powered by Reaume Brothers Racing	Ford	51.010	—
37	50	Kaz Grala (i)	The Money Team Racing	Chevrolet	51.094	—
38	44	Greg Biffle (i)	NY Racing Team	Chevrolet	51.100	—
39	78	B. J. McLeod	Live Fast Motorsports	Ford	51.153	—
40	15	David Ragan	Rick Ware Racing	Ford	51.216	—
41	55	J. J. Yeley (i)	MBM Motorsports	Ford	52.005	—
42	66	Timmy Hill (i)	MBM Motorsports	Ford	52.263	—
Official qualifying results

== Bluegreen Vacations Duel ==
The Bluegreen Vacations Duels are a pair of NASCAR Cup Series races held in conjunction with the Daytona 500 annually in February at Daytona International Speedway. They consist of two races 60 laps and 150 miles (240 km) in length, which serve as heat races that set the lineup for the Daytona 500. The first race sets the lineup for cars that qualified in odd-numbered positions on pole qualifying day, while the second race sets the lineup for cars that qualified in even-numbered positions. The Duels set the lineup for positions 3–38, while positions 39 and 40 are filled by the two "Open" (teams without a charter) cars that set the fastest times in qualifying, but did not lock in a spot in the Duels.

=== Duel 1 ===
==== Duel 1 results ====
Pos	Grid	No	Driver	Team	Manufacturer	Laps	Points
1	9	6	Brad Keselowski	RFK Racing	Ford	60	10
2	11	2	Austin Cindric (R)	Team Penske	Ford	60	9
3	7	12	Ryan Blaney	Team Penske	Ford	60	8
4	10	14	Chase Briscoe	Stewart-Haas Racing	Ford	60	7
5	3	9	Chase Elliott	Hendrick Motorsports	Chevrolet	60	6
6	12	43	Erik Jones	Petty GMS Motorsports	Chevrolet	60	5
7	1	5	Kyle Larson	Hendrick Motorsports	Chevrolet	60	4
8	8	8	Tyler Reddick	Richard Childress Racing	Chevrolet	60	3
9	13	45	Kurt Busch	23XI Racing	Toyota	60	2
10	4	1	Ross Chastain	Trackhouse Racing Team	Chevrolet	60	1
11	5	99	Daniel Suárez	Trackhouse Racing Team	Chevrolet	60	0
12	2	24	William Byron	Hendrick Motorsports	Chevrolet	60	0
13	14	31	Justin Haley	Kaulig Racing	Chevrolet	60	0
14	18	77	Landon Cassill (i)	Spire Motorsports	Chevrolet	60	0
15	16	38	Todd Gilliland (R)	Front Row Motorsports	Ford	60	0
16	15	41	Cole Custer	Stewart-Haas Racing	Ford	59	0
17	6	16	Daniel Hemric (i)	Kaulig Racing	Chevrolet	59	0
18	19	50	Kaz Grala (i)	The Money Team Racing	Chevrolet	58	0
19	21	55	J. J. Yeley (i)	MBM Motorsports	Ford	58	0
20	20	78	B. J. McLeod	Live Fast Motorsports	Ford	58	0
21	17	62	Noah Gragson (i)	Beard Motorsports	Chevrolet	57	0
Official race results

=== Duel 2 ===
==== Duel 2 results ====
Pos	Grid	No	Driver	Team	Manufacturer	Laps	Points
1	14	17	Chris Buescher	RFK Racing	Ford	60	10
2	11	34	Michael McDowell	Front Row Motorsports	Ford	60	9
3	5	21	Harrison Burton (R)	Wood Brothers Racing	Ford	60	8
4	9	18	Kyle Busch	Joe Gibbs Racing	Toyota	60	7
5	7	20	Christopher Bell	Joe Gibbs Racing	Toyota	60	6
6	3	19	Martin Truex Jr.	Joe Gibbs Racing	Toyota	60	5
7	8	23	Bubba Wallace	23XI Racing	Toyota	60	4
8	16	47	Ricky Stenhouse Jr.	JTG Daugherty Racing	Chevrolet	60	3
9	6	22	Joey Logano	Team Penske	Ford	59	2
10	13	4	Kevin Harvick	Stewart-Haas Racing	Ford	59	1
11	15	7	Corey LaJoie	Spire Motorsports	Chevrolet	59	0
12	12	42	Ty Dillon	Petty GMS Motorsports	Chevrolet	59	0
13	19	44	Greg Biffle (i)	NY Racing Team	Chevrolet	59	0
14	1	48	Alex Bowman	Hendrick Motorsports	Chevrolet	59	0
15	4	11	Denny Hamlin	Joe Gibbs Racing	Toyota	59	0
16	17	51	Cody Ware	Rick Ware Racing	Ford	59	0
17	20	15	David Ragan	Rick Ware Racing	Ford	58	0
18	10	3	Austin Dillon	Richard Childress Racing	Chevrolet	58	0
19	2	10	Aric Almirola	Stewart-Haas Racing	Ford	58	0
20	21	66	Timmy Hill (i)	MBM Motorsports	Ford	56	0
21	18	27	Jacques Villeneuve	Team Hezeberg Powered by Reaume Brothers Racing	Ford	34	0
Official race results

=== Starting lineup ===
Pos	No.	Driver	Team	Manufacturer	Notes
1	5	Kyle Larson	Hendrick Motorsports	Chevrolet	Fastest in pole qualifying
2	48	Alex Bowman	Hendrick Motorsports	Chevrolet	Second in pole qualifying
3	6	Brad Keselowski	RFK Racing	Ford	Duel 1 Winner
4	17	Chris Buescher	RFK Racing	Ford	Duel 2 Winner
5	2	Austin Cindric (R)	Team Penske	Ford	Second in Duel 1
6	34	Michael McDowell	Front Row Motorsports	Ford	Second in Duel 2
7	12	Ryan Blaney	Team Penske	Ford	Third in Duel 1
8	21	Harrison Burton (R)	Wood Brothers Racing	Ford	Third in Duel 2
9	14	Chase Briscoe	Stewart-Haas Racing	Ford	Fourth in Duel 1
10	18	Kyle Busch	Joe Gibbs Racing	Toyota	Fourth in Duel 2
11	9	Chase Elliott	Hendrick Motorsports	Chevrolet	Fifth in Duel 1
12	20	Christopher Bell	Joe Gibbs Racing	Toyota	Fifth in Duel 2
13	43	Erik Jones	Petty GMS Motorsports	Chevrolet	Sixth in Duel 1
14	19	Martin Truex Jr.	Joe Gibbs Racing	Toyota	Sixth in Duel 2
15	8	Tyler Reddick	Richard Childress Racing	Chevrolet	Eighth in Duel 1
16	23	Bubba Wallace	23XI Racing	Toyota	Seventh in Duel 2
17	45	Kurt Busch	23XI Racing	Toyota	Ninth in Duel 1
18	47	Ricky Stenhouse Jr.	JTG Daugherty Racing	Chevrolet	Eighth in Duel 2
19	1	Ross Chastain	Trackhouse Racing Team	Chevrolet	Tenth in Duel 1
20	22	Joey Logano	Team Penske	Ford	Ninth in Duel 2
21	99	Daniel Suárez	Trackhouse Racing Team	Chevrolet	Eleventh in Duel 1
22	4	Kevin Harvick	Stewart-Haas Racing	Ford	Tenth in Duel 2
23	24	William Byron	Hendrick Motorsports	Chevrolet	Twelfth in Duel 1
24	7	Corey LaJoie	Spire Motorsports	Chevrolet	Eleventh in Duel 2
25	31	Justin Haley	Kaulig Racing	Chevrolet	Thirteenth in Duel 1
26	42	Ty Dillon	Petty GMS Motorsports	Chevrolet	Twelfth in Duel 2
27	77	Landon Cassill (i)	Spire Motorsports	Chevrolet	Fourteenth in Duel 1
28	44	Greg Biffle (i)	NY Racing Team	Chevrolet	Thirteenth in Duel 2
29	38	Todd Gilliland (R)	Front Row Motorsports	Ford	Fifteenth in Duel 1
30	11	Denny Hamlin	Joe Gibbs Racing	Toyota	Fifteenth in Duel 2
31	41	Cole Custer	Stewart-Haas Racing	Ford	Sixteenth in Duel 1
32	51	Cody Ware	Rick Ware Racing	Ford	Sixteenth in Duel 2
33	16	Daniel Hemric (i)	Kaulig Racing	Chevrolet	Seventeenth in Duel 1
34	15	David Ragan	Rick Ware Racing	Ford	Seventeenth in Duel 2
35	50	Kaz Grala (i)	The Money Team Racing	Chevrolet	Eighteenth in Duel 1
36	3	Austin Dillon	Richard Childress Racing	Chevrolet	Eighteenth in Duel 2
37	78	B. J. McLeod	Live Fast Motorsports	Ford	Twentieth in Duel 1
38	10	Aric Almirola	Stewart-Haas Racing	Ford	Nineteenth in Duel 2
39	62	Noah Gragson (i)	Beard Motorsports	Chevrolet	Qualifying speed
40	27	Jacques Villeneuve	Team Hezeberg Powered by Reaume Brothers Racing	Ford	Qualifying speed
Did not qualify
41	55	J. J. Yeley (i)	MBM Motorsports	Ford	
42	66	Timmy Hill (i)	MBM Motorsports	Ford	
Official starting lineup

== Practice (post–Duels) ==
=== Third practice (February 18) ===
Michael McDowell was the fastest in the third practice session with a time of 46.710 seconds and a speed of 192.678 mph (310.085 km/h).

Pos	No.	Driver	Team	Manufacturer	Time	Speed
1	34	Michael McDowell	Front Row Motorsports	Ford	46.710	192.678
2	38	Todd Gilliland (R)	Front Row Motorsports	Ford	46.787	192.361
3	15	David Ragan	Rick Ware Racing	Ford	46.808	192.275
Official third practice results

=== Final practice (February 19) ===
Harrison Burton was the fastest in the final practice session with a time of 47.782 seconds and a speed of 188.355 mph (303.128 km/h).

Pos	No.	Driver	Team	Manufacturer	Time	Speed
1	21	Harrison Burton (R)	Wood Brothers Racing	Ford	47.782	188.355
2	22	Joey Logano	Team Penske	Ford	47.790	188.324
3	2	Austin Cindric (R)	Team Penske	Ford	47.805	188.265
Official final practice results

== Race ==
Starting in 3rd place, Brad Keselowski took the lead from Kyle Larson and Alex Bowman and led the first lap of the race. On lap 7, Keselowski began to battle for the lead with Kyle Busch with Busch leading that lap but Keselowski got out in front of Busch on lap 8. On lap 27, Busch took the lead from Keselowski but Keselowski battled with him on lap 32 which Keselowski would lead that lap before Busch took it back the next lap. During green flag pitstops on lap 39, Jacques Villeneuve, making his first Daytona 500 start, spun coming to pit road and was able to keep the car going and no caution was thrown. The first caution flew on lap 41 when Kaz Grala's right rear wheel came off and Chase Briscoe got turned by Austin Cindric. The race restarted on lap 46 with Kyle Busch remaining as the leader. On lap 52, the second caution flew when Justin Haley's right front wheel came off. The race restarted on lap 57 with Kyle Busch remaining as the leader. On lap 58, William Byron took the lead from Busch. Harrison Burton took the lead from Byron on lap 59 but Burton lost the lead to Martin Truex Jr. on lap 61. With 3 laps to go in stage 1 on lap 63, an 8 car wreck occurred on the backstretch. It started when Brad Keselowski was pushing Harrison Burton when Keselowski pushed Burton at the wrong angle turning Burton into William Byron, Kyle Busch, Denny Hamlin, Ross Chastain, Christopher Bell, and Alex Bowman. Burton's car caught air, flipped over, and landed back on all 4 of his wheels. Everyone walked away from the wreck without any major injuries. Stage 1 ended under caution with Martin Truex Jr. winning the stage. Ryan Blaney led the field to the restart on lap 72. After green flag pit stops, Brad Keselowski took the lead on lap 110. On lap 125, Kyle Larson took the lead from Keselowski but Keselowski took it back from Larson on the next lap. With 2 laps to go in stage 2, Martin Truex Jr. took the lead and also won the stage edging out Joey Logano. The race restarted on lap 138 with Brad Keselowski leading the race. With 50 laps to go, the 5th caution flew for a 5 car crash on the front stretch. It started when Tyler Reddick got turned by Jacques Villeneuve collecting Martin Truex Jr., Joey Logano, and Kurt Busch. The race restarted with 41 laps to go with Austin Cindric leading the field. Cindric soon began to battle for the lead with Bubba Wallace.

=== Final laps ===
With 23 laps to go, Ricky Stenhouse Jr. took the lead from Wallace. Wallace led with 22 to go but Stenhouse took full advantage the next lap. With 10 laps to go, a 6 car crash occurred in the tri-oval. Kevin Harvick got turned by Kyle Larson in which Harvick turned left and hooked Noah Gragson sending Gragson into the outside wall. The wreck also collected Chase Elliott, Todd Gilliland, and Erik Jones. The race was red flagged for a short period of time for over 5 minutes. On the restart with 6 laps to go, Austin Cindric took the lead with help from his teammate Ryan Blaney. Out of turn 4 on the same lap, Ricky Stenhouse Jr. got turned by Brad Keselowski and collected Chris Buescher bringing out the 7th and final caution of the race. The race would set up overtime. On the restart, Cindric held onto his lead with help from Ryan Blaney. In just his 8th Cup Series start and his 2nd Daytona 500 attempt, Austin Cindric held off the pack and beat Bubba Wallace by half a car length to win his first Cup Series race of his career. Chase Briscoe, Ryan Blaney, and Aric Almirola rounded out the top 5 while Kyle Busch, Michael McDowell, David Ragan, Brad Keselowski, and Chase Elliott rounded out the top 10.

=== Stage Results ===
Stage One Laps: 65

Pos	No	Driver	Team	Manufacturer	Points
1	19	Martin Truex Jr.	Joe Gibbs Racing	Toyota	10
2	6	Brad Keselowski	RFK Racing	Ford	9
3	38	Todd Gilliland (R)	Front Row Motorsports	Ford	8
4	47	Ricky Stenhouse Jr.	JTG Daugherty Racing	Chevrolet	7
5	22	Joey Logano	Team Penske	Ford	6
6	3	Austin Dillon	Richard Childress Racing	Chevrolet	5
7	45	Kurt Busch	23XI Racing	Toyota	4
8	43	Erik Jones	Petty GMS Racing	Chevrolet	3
9	5	Kyle Larson	Hendrick Motorsports	Chevrolet	2
10	9	Chase Elliott	Hendrick Motorsports	Chevrolet	1
Official stage one results

Stage Two Laps: 65

Pos	No	Driver	Team	Manufacturer	Points
1	19	Martin Truex Jr.	Joe Gibbs Racing	Toyota	10
2	22	Joey Logano	Team Penske	Ford	9
3	23	Bubba Wallace	23XI Racing	Toyota	8
4	6	Brad Keselowski	RFK Racing	Ford	7
5	47	Ricky Stenhouse Jr.	JTG Daugherty Racing	Chevrolet	6
6	2	Austin Cindric (R)	Team Penske	Ford	5
7	17	Chris Buescher	RFK Racing	Ford	4
8	4	Kevin Harvick	Stewart-Haas Racing	Ford	3
9	5	Kyle Larson	Hendrick Motorsports	Chevrolet	2
10	38	Todd Gilliland (R)	Front Row Motorsports	Ford	1
Official stage two results

=== Final Stage Results ===
Stage Three Laps: 71

Pos	Grid	No	Driver	Team	Manufacturer	Laps	Points
1	5	2	Austin Cindric (R)	Team Penske	Ford	201	45
2	16	23	Bubba Wallace	23XI Racing	Toyota	201	43
3	9	14	Chase Briscoe	Stewart-Haas Racing	Ford	201	34
4	7	12	Ryan Blaney	Team Penske	Ford	201	33
5	38	10	Aric Almirola	Stewart-Haas Racing	Ford	201	32
6	10	18	Kyle Busch	Joe Gibbs Racing	Toyota	201	31
7	6	34	Michael McDowell	Front Row Motorsports	Ford	201	30
8	34	15	David Ragan	Rick Ware Racing	Ford	201	29
9	3	6	Brad Keselowski	RFK Racing	Ford	201	44
10	11	9	Chase Elliott	Hendrick Motorsports	Chevrolet	201	28
11	26	42	Ty Dillon	Petty GMS Motorsports	Chevrolet	201	26
12	33	16	Daniel Hemric (i)	Kaulig Racing	Chevrolet	201	0
13	14	19	Martin Truex Jr.	Joe Gibbs Racing	Toyota	201	44
14	24	7	Corey LaJoie	Spire Motorsports	Chevrolet	201	23
15	27	77	Landon Cassill (i)	Spire Motorsports	Chevrolet	201	0
16	4	17	Chris Buescher	RFK Racing	Ford	200	25
17	32	51	Cody Ware	Rick Ware Racing	Ford	200	20
18	21	99	Daniel Suárez	Trackhouse Racing Team	Chevrolet	199	19
19	17	45	Kurt Busch	23XI Racing	Toyota	199	22
20	31	41	Cole Custer	Stewart-Haas Racing	Ford	199	17
21	20	22	Joey Logano	Team Penske	Ford	198	31
22	40	27	Jacques Villeneuve	Team Hezeberg Powered by Reaume Brothers Racing	Ford	198	15
23	25	31	Justin Haley	Kaulig Racing	Chevrolet	198	14
24	2	48	Alex Bowman	Hendrick Motorsports	Chevrolet	197	13
25	36	3	Austin Dillon	Richard Childress Racing	Chevrolet	197	17
26	35	50	Kaz Grala (i)	The Money Team Racing	Chevrolet	196	11
27	37	78	B. J. McLeod	Live Fast Motorsports	Ford	196	10
28	18	47	Ricky Stenhouse Jr.	JTG Daugherty Racing	Chevrolet	194	22
29	13	43	Erik Jones	Petty GMS Motorsports	Chevrolet	191	11
30	22	4	Kevin Harvick	Stewart-Haas Racing	Ford	191	10
31	39	62	Noah Gragson (i)	Beard Motorsports	Chevrolet	190	0
32	1	5	Kyle Larson	Hendrick Motorsports	Chevrolet	190	9
33	29	38	Todd Gilliland (R)	Front Row Motorsports	Ford	190	13
34	12	20	Christopher Bell	Joe Gibbs Racing	Toyota	152	3
35	15	8	Tyler Reddick	Richard Childress Racing	Chevrolet	151	2
36	28	44	Greg Biffle (i)	NY Racing Team	Chevrolet	136	0
37	30	11	Denny Hamlin	Joe Gibbs Racing	Toyota	63	1
38	23	24	William Byron	Hendrick Motorsports	Chevrolet	62	1
39	8	21	Harrison Burton (R)	Wood Brothers Racing	Ford	62	1
40	19	1	Ross Chastain	Trackhouse Racing Team	Chevrolet	62	1
Official race results

=== Race statistics ===
- Lead changes: 35 among 13 different drivers
- Cautions/Laps: 7 for 37
- Red flags: 1 for 5 minutes and 32 seconds
- Time of race: 3 hours, 31 minutes and 53 seconds
- Average speed: 142.295 miles per hour (229.002 km/h)

== Media ==
=== Television ===
Since 2001—with the exception of 2002, 2004 and 2006—the Daytona 500 has been carried by Fox in the United States. The booth crew consists of longtime NASCAR lap-by-lap announcer Mike Joy, Clint Bowyer, and three-time NASCAR Cup Series champion and co-owner of Stewart-Haas Racing Tony Stewart. Jamie Little, Regan Smith and Vince Welch handled pit road for the television side. 1992 and 1998 Daytona 500 winning crew chief Larry McReynolds provided insight from the Fox Sports studio in Charlotte.

Fox Television
Booth announcers	Pit reporters	In-race analyst
Lap-by-lap: Mike Joy; Color-commentator: Clint Bowyer; Color-commentator: Tony Stewart	Jamie Little; Regan Smith; Vince Welch	Larry McReynolds

=== Radio ===
The race was broadcast on radio by the Motor Racing Network who has covered the Daytona 500 since 1970—and simulcast on Sirius XM NASCAR Radio. The booth crew consists of Alex Hayden, Jeff Striegle, and 1989 Cup Series champion Rusty Wallace. Longtime turn announcer Dave Moody was the lead turn announcer, calling the race from atop the Sunoco tower outside the exit of turn 2 when the field races through turns 1 and 2. Mike Bagley works the backstretch for the race from a spotter's stand on the inside of the track & Kyle Rickey called the race when the field races through turns 3 and 4 from the Sunoco tower outside the exit of turn 4. On pit road, MRN was manned by Steve Post, Georgia Henneberry, and Dillon Welch.

MRN Radio
Booth announcers	Turn announcers	Pit reporters
Lead announcer: Alex Hayden; Announcer: Jeff Striegle; Announcer: Rusty Wallace	Turns 1 & 2: Dave Moody; Backstretch: Mike Bagley; Turns 3 & 4: Kyle Rickey	Steve Post; Georgia Henneberry; Dillon Welch

== Standings after the race ==
Drivers' Championship standings

Pos	Driver	Points
1	Austin Cindric	54
2	Brad Keselowski	54 (–0)
3	Martin Truex Jr.	49 (–5)
4	Bubba Wallace	47 (–7)
5	Chase Briscoe	41 (–13)
6	Ryan Blaney	41 (–13)
7	Michael McDowell	39 (–15)
8	Kyle Busch	38 (–16)
9	Chris Buescher	35 (–19)
10	Chase Elliott	34 (–20)
11	Joey Logano	33 (–21)
12	Aric Almirola	32 (–22)
13	David Ragan	29 (–25)
14	Ty Dillon	26 (–28)
15	Ricky Stenhouse Jr.	25 (–29)
16	Kurt Busch	24 (–30)
Official driver's standings

Manufacturers' Championship standings

Pos	Manufacturer	Points
1	Ford	40
2	Toyota	35 (–5)
3	Chevrolet	27 (–13)

- Note: Only the first 16 positions are included for the driver standings.

Previous race: 2021 NASCAR Cup Series Championship Race	NASCAR Cup Series; 2022 season	Next race: 2022 WISE Power 400
