= Next Gen (NASCAR) =

Seventh generation NASCAR race car

- Kyle Larson's Chevrolet ZL1 Next Gen car before the 2026 Pennzoil 400.
- Category: NASCAR Cup Series
- Constructor: (United States) Chevrolet (United States) Dodge (United States) Ford (Japan) Toyota
- Predecessor: Generation 6

Technical specifications
- Chassis: Steel tube frame with integral safety roll cage
- Length: 193.4 in (4,912 mm)
- Width: 78.6 in (1,996 mm)
- Height: 50.4 in (1,280 mm)
- Wheelbase: 110 in (2,794 mm)
- Engine: Chevrolet R07 (2022-present), Ford FR9 (2022-present), and TRD Phase-14 (2022–present) 5.86 L (358 cu in) V8 Naturally-aspirated FR layout
- Transmission: 5 forward speeds + 1 reverse Sequential manual transmission
- Weight: 3,200 lb (1,451 kg) minimum without driver and fuel 3,400 lb (1,542 kg) minimum with driver and fuel
- Fuel: Sunoco Green E15 98 octane race fuel
- Tires: Goodyear

Competition history
- Debut: February 20, 2022 (2022 Daytona 500)

The Next Gen car, also known as the Gen-7 car, is the common name for the racecar that is currently in use in the NASCAR Cup Series. Its use began with the 2022 season. A further evolution of the Generation 6 car, the Next Gen features more sophisticated aero and downforce packages and new technologies like a five speed semi-automatic transmission and a rear view camera. In addition, the Next Gen is designed to lower costs and attract new original equipment manufacturers (OEMs) to compete with Chevrolet, Dodge, Ford, and Toyota.

The Next Gen body style was set to debut at the 2021 Daytona 500, but when the COVID-19 pandemic postponed all NASCAR racing (and therefore, testing) until the month of May, the sanctioning body announced that the debut of the car would be pushed back a year to 2022.

Prior to the 2022 Xfinity 500 at Martinsville Speedway, Chevrolet clinched its 41st manufacturers' championship and the first in the Next Gen era. At the conclusion of the 2022 NASCAR Cup Series Championship Race at Phoenix Raceway, Joey Logano of Team Penske claimed his second Cup Series championship and became the Next Gen era's first champion.

== History ==
=== Testing sessions ===
The rules package of the 2019 season served as the starting point of the Next Gen's development. The prototype, built by Richard Childress Racing using a generic body, was tested for the first time on October 8–9 by driver Austin Dillon at Richmond Raceway.

The second test of the car was done at Phoenix Raceway on December 9–10 with Joey Logano behind the wheel. Erik Jones drove the car in its third test, which was held at Homestead–Miami Speedway on January 15–16.

The fourth test was at Auto Club Speedway with William Byron on March 2–3. John Probst, NASCAR's senior vice president of racing innovation, commented that the "P3" prototype Byron tested was nearly 100 percent of the final product.

Due to the COVID-19 pandemic, all racing was postponed through the month of May. Further testing that was scheduled to take place at Atlanta Motor Speedway with Clint Bowyer on March 16–17 was still on since the Next Gen testing was exempted from NASCAR's indefinite ban on all testing. However, this decision was quickly reversed because of the situation as the Atlanta weekend was postponed shortly after the Rudy Gobert incident at an NBA game days prior that led to NASCAR's decision on postponement. A handful of manufacturers, teams, and drivers alike indicated their hope for the debut of the car to be postponed one year to 2022 as a result of the lost testing time. On March 30, 2020, it was reported that NASCAR was taking a serious look at pushing back the rollout of the new car to 2022. NASCAR officially confirmed these reports on April 2, 2020, and the car's debut was pushed back a year to allow for enough testing time after the postponement of all events through May.

On August 17, NASCAR announced that testing of the Next Gen would resume at Dover International Speedway with Cole Custer on August 18–19, while another prototype, built by Action Express Racing, was tested at the Daytona road course with Felipe Nasr driving the day after the Daytona road course events.

On November 10, NASCAR announced Charlotte Motor Speedway would host a pair of tests, with Kurt Busch and Martin Truex Jr. participating in both with a pair of prototype chassis. The tests took place on November 16–18 with the first day being held on the road course, and the second day on the oval.

On December 11, NASCAR announced the Next Gen's first superspeedway test at Daytona on December 14–15, with Chris Buescher as the test driver. The Next Gen has successfully passed all speed tests. They were able to focus on the gearbox and other features. The next tests took place at Charlotte before further tire tests were carried out with Goodyear.

On February 1, 2021, NASCAR announced that the development stage of the Next Gen was complete. On April 1, Chevrolet, Ford, and Toyota, brought prototypes of their Next Gen cars to Martinsville Speedway for testing alongside NASCAR's evaluation of Goodyear's wet-weather tires. On April 6–7, Tyler Reddick conducted a Goodyear tire test for the Next Gen at Darlington Raceway. During the final run of the testing, Reddick lost control of the car and scraped the outside wall, damaging the right side of the car.

On June 30, Ross Chastain tested the Chevrolet Next Gen at Dover.

NASCAR conducted further testing at Texas Motor Speedway on July 27–28, with Justin Allgaier in the Chevrolet, David Ragan in the Ford, and Drew Herring in the Toyota. Herring reportedly crashed the Toyota during the test. On August 20, Christopher Bell tested the Toyota at Bristol Motor Speedway. On August 31, eight teams were announced to do tire testing at Daytona on September 7–8. The teams are the Richard Childress Racing No. 3 Chevrolet driven by Austin Dillon, the Joe Gibbs Racing No. 11 Toyota driven by Denny Hamlin, the Roush Fenway Racing No. 17 Ford driven by Chris Buescher, the Team Penske No. 22 Ford driven by Logano, the Hendrick Motorsports No. 24 Chevrolet driven by William Byron, the Stewart–Haas Racing No. 41 Ford driven by Cole Custer, the Chip Ganassi Racing No. 42 Chevrolet driven by Chastain, and the JTG Daugherty Racing No. 47 Chevrolet driven by Ricky Stenhouse Jr.

On October 8, StarCom Racing announced that Kaz Grala would test the Next Gen at the Charlotte Roval on October 11. Three days later, NASCAR announced the schedule of the Next Gen's testing before the 2022 season: November 17–18 at Charlotte, December 14–15 at Phoenix, and January 11–12 at Daytona. On October 26, Dale Earnhardt Jr., Tony Stewart, and Bowyer tested the Next Gen at Bowman Gray Stadium for Goodyear to determine the tires to use at the 2022 Busch Clash at the Los Angeles Memorial Coliseum. On October 27, Bob Pockrass of Fox Sports reported that Stewart Friesen would test the Next Gen at Wythe Raceway in Rural Retreat, Virginia to determine the tires to use for the Food City Dirt Race at Bristol. On November 25, NASCAR rescheduled the Phoenix testing session to January 25–26, replacing the Las Vegas testing schedule. NASCAR also tentatively scheduled additional Charlotte sessions on December 15 and 17 for testing under cold weather conditions. On November 30, Phoenix Raceway announced free admission for fans to watch the January 25 testing session. On December 9, Friesen completed further Goodyear dirt tire testing at Lancaster Motor Speedway in Lancaster, South Carolina.

During the Charlotte testing on November 17, Dillon's car sustained major damage after hitting the outside wall in turn 2 and sliding into the inside wall. Mechanics and engineers from all participating teams examined the wrecked car to assess the damage. Richard Childress Racing was able to return the car to its shop for repairs and send it back to the track later that night. "So, yeah, it was a really good feeling knowing that the car performed as designed. Looking at the front bumper on it, looked like it crushed the way it was designed to do," said John Probst, NASCAR's senior vice president of racing innovation. At Charlotte on December 15, Reddick lost control of his car and slammed on the sand barrels in front of pit road. Following the Charlotte test sessions, NASCAR announced that teams will use the 670 horsepower and 4-inch spoiler package for intermediate tracks, short tracks, and road courses.

On April 19, 2022, Bubba Wallace, Chastain, and Custer participated in a tire testing session at Charlotte in preparation for the 2022 Coca-Cola 600. Kyle Busch, Daniel Suárez, and Aric Almirola participated in tire testing at Pocono Raceway on May 11.

=== Unveiling ===
NASCAR unveiled the Next Gen Chevrolet Camaro ZL1, Ford Mustang GT, and Toyota Camry TRD at The Park Expo in Charlotte, North Carolina on May 5, 2021, with Chase Elliott, Logano, and Hamlin representing their respective brands during the event. On May 25, Öhlins was announced as the official shock absorber provider for the Next Gen.

=== Rule changes ===
On January 24, 2022, NASCAR announced a more stringent penalty system structure for the Cup Series. The penalty system is structured in three tiers from L1 to L3, with L3 reserved for the tampering and counterfeiting of Next Gen single-source vendor parts. L3 violations will result in a deduction of owner and driver points (including playoff points), revocation of playoff/chase eligibility, crew member suspensions, or postseason bans.

On March 24, 2022, Matt McCall, crew chief of the RFK Racing No. 6 driven by Brad Keselowski, was suspended for four races and fined US$100,000 for an L2 penalty during post-race inspection after the 2022 Folds of Honor QuikTrip 500 at Atlanta. The penalty came under Sections 14.1 and 14.5 in the NASCAR Rule Book, both of which pertain to the modification of a single-source supplied part. In addition, the No. 6 team was docked 100 driver and owner points and 10 playoff points. On April 13, Scott Miller, NASCAR's senior vice president of competition, explained that the repairs to No. 6's rear fascia did not meet original specifications, as a critical dimension of the part was altered.

Prior to the 2022 M&M's Fan Appreciation 400 at Pocono, both the No. 42 (driven by Ty Dillon) and No. 43 (driven by Jones) cars of Petty GMS Motorsports were each docked 35 driver and owner points for an L1 penalty when the pre-race inspection revealed issues on the cars' rocker box vent holes. Hamlin and Kyle Busch of Joe Gibbs Racing finished first and second, respectively, at the race, but were disqualified after the post-race inspection revealed illegal modifications on the cars' front fascias. On July 26, Blake Harris, the crew chief of the Front Row Motorsports No. 34 car driven by Michael McDowell, was suspended for four races and fined US$100,000 for an L2 penalty during post-race inspection after the Pocono race. The penalty came under Sections 14.1 C, D and Q and 14.5 A and B in the NASCAR Rule Book, both of which pertain to the body and overall vehicle assembly rules surrounding modification of a single-source supplied part. In addition, the No. 34 team was docked 100 driver and owner points and 10 playoff points.

On October 5, Rodney Childers, crew chief of the Stewart–Haas Racing No. 4 driven by Kevin Harvick, was suspended for four races and fined US$100,000 for an L2 penalty during post-race inspection after the 2022 YellaWood 500 at Talladega. The penalty came under Sections 14.1 (vehicle assembly) and 14.5 (body) in the NASCAR Rule Book, both of which pertain to the body and overall vehicle assembly rules surrounding modification of a single-source supplied part. In addition, the No. 4 team was docked 100 driver and owner points.

On May 31, 2023, NASCAR handed out the first L3 penalty to the Stewart–Haas Racing No. 14 driven by Chase Briscoe for counterfeiting a single-source part, following R&D inspection after the 2023 Coca-Cola 600. Briscoe's team was docked 120 driver and owner points and 25 playoff points and Briscoe's crew chief, Johnny Klausmeier, was given a six-race suspension and the team was fined $250,000, although NASCAR did not revoke the No. 14/Briscoe's playoff eligibility.

On August 22, 2024, the Joe Gibbs Racing No. 11 driven by Hamlin was issued an L2 penalty for an engine inspection violation after TRD admitted that the race-winning engine from Bristol was returned to their facility in Costa Mesa, California and rebuilt instead of being torn down and inspected by NASCAR after the race. As a result, the team was docked 75 owner and driver points and 10 playoff points, and crew chief Chris Gabehart was fined US$100,000.

On February 19, 2025, following the 2025 Daytona 500, NASCAR levied an L2 penalty to the Joe Gibbs Racing No. 19 team driven by Briscoe after the pole-winning car was discovered to have an illegal spoiler modification. As a result, Briscoe was penalized 100 driver points and 10 drivers' playoff points. JGR was fined US$100,000, deducted 100 owner points, as well as 10 owners' playoff points. In addition, crew chief James Small was suspended for four races. On March 5, the National Motorsports Appeals Panel overturned the penalty, ruling that the elongation of some of the holes on the No. 19 car's spoiler base were a result of wear and tear and not an illegal modification. On May 15, following the Kansas spring race, the RFK Racing No. 17 car driven by Chris Buescher was issued an L1 penalty after R&D discovered the reinforcement behind the front bumper foam exceeded two inches. As a result, the team was docked 60 owner and driver points, five playoff points, and fined US$75,000, and crew chief Scott Graves was suspended for two races.

=== Debut ===
Heading into the first races of the 2022 season, a concern was raised regarding parts supply chain issues, partly due to the control parts rule introduced with the generation, as well as ongoing supply chain issues caused by the COVID-19 pandemic; it was reported that teams may face shortage of spare parts and backup cars for the beginning of the season. For its part, NASCAR announced that the team that won the Daytona 500 in 2022 would get to retain their car for the rest of the season, with NASCAR instead scanning the winning car and placing an identical paint scheme wrap (complete with Victory Lane confetti) on a prototype that would be shown at the Daytona 500 Experience.

The Next Gen made its official debut at the 2022 Busch Light Clash at The Coliseum in Los Angeles, with Logano winning the exhibition race.

The car made its points race debut at the 2022 Daytona 500, won by Austin Cindric. Numerous issues with the car cropped up during the race, including several cars having issues with wheels or tire rubber popping off, difficulty getting the center-locking lug nuts to go in, hood flaps flying off, and a crash that saw Harrison Burton flip, with many fans noting that the car stayed sideways for too long, as well as the flat undertray compared to past cars, both of which allowed enough air to get underneath the car to lift it off the ground, recalling an issue with the first design of the Car of Tomorrow where the original rear wing produced enough lift to render the roof flaps completely useless. Earlier in the week during first practice, teams had exploited the independent rear suspension to skew the cars out of proportion to get better downforce and corner speed, which was compared to the "Twisted Sister" cars created by skewing the bodies of the Generation 4 cars out of proportion. Prior to pole qualifying, NASCAR clamped down on this practice. Although Penske was allowed to retain the car due to the parts shortage concerns, the team opted not to do so and instead handed over the exact winning car to the Daytona 500 Experience several weeks after the race.

=== Le Mans Garage 56 project ===
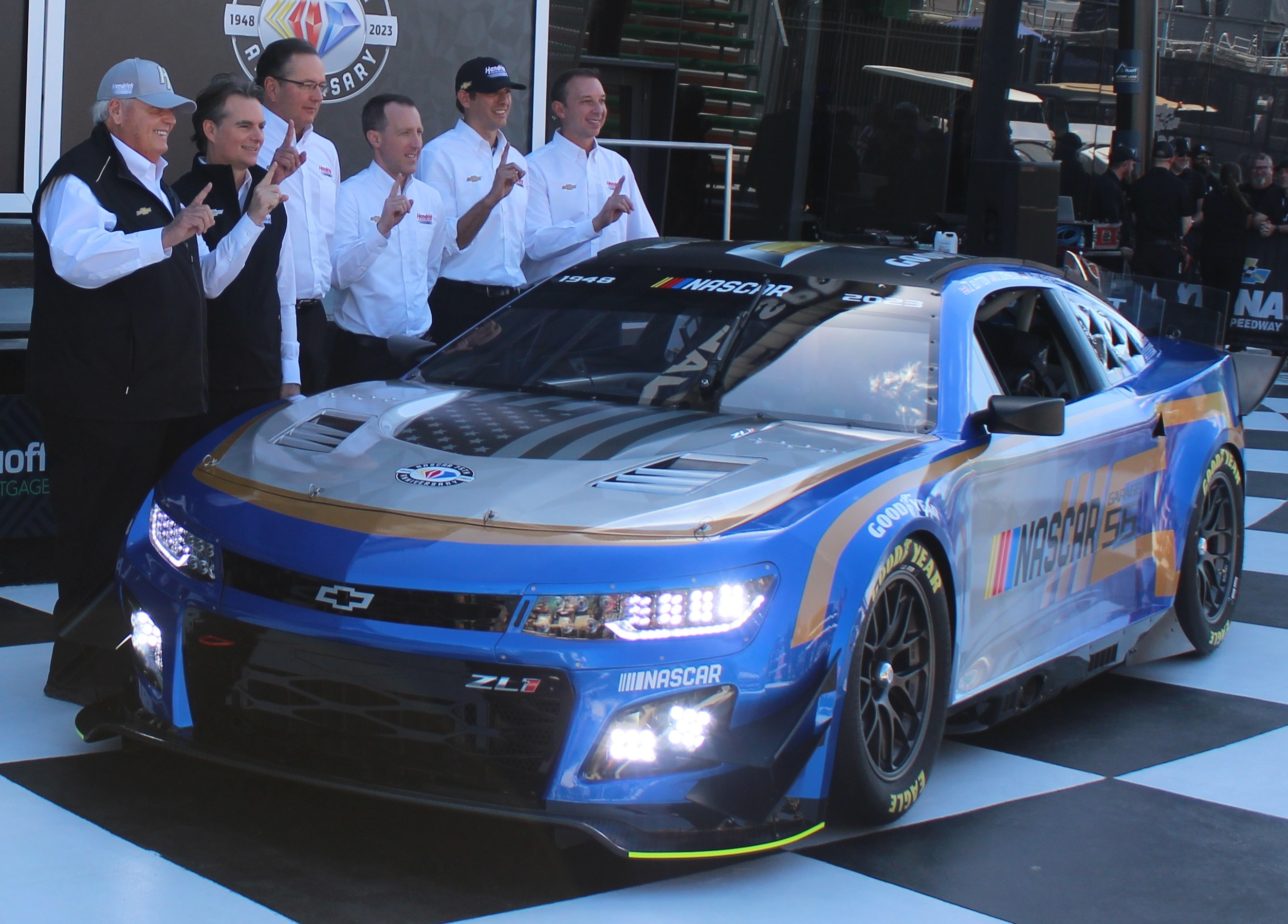
Rick Hendrick (left), Jeff Gordon (second left), and Chad Knaus (far right) with the Garage 56 NASCAR entry

On March 17, 2022, NASCAR and Hendrick Motorsports announced they would field a Next Gen Camaro ZL1 1LE at the 2023 24 Hours of Le Mans as a special Garage 56 entry, with former crew chief Chad Knaus assigned as the program manager. This marked the first time a NASCAR stock car ran at Le Mans since 1976, when a Dodge Charger driven by Hershel McGriff and his son Doug ran for two laps, and a Ford Torino owned by Donlavey Racing and driven by Dick Brooks, Dick Hutcherson, and Marcel Mignot retired after 104 laps.

The announcement was criticized by Hamlin, who took issue with NASCAR not informing other teams of the program. In addition, he noted that this gave Hendrick Motorsports an unfair advantage over other teams. Toyota Racing Development president David Wilson was also disappointed that neither Toyota nor Ford were informed of the program.

On April 15, it was reported that Jeff Gordon was interested in participating at Le Mans, but he did not indicate that he would be part of the Next Gen program. On November 14, the Garage 56 prototype made its test run at Virginia International Raceway, with veteran Le Mans driver and 2010 LMP1 and overall champion Mike Rockenfeller behind the wheel.

On January 28, 2023, NASCAR announced the driver roster of the Garage 56 entry: seven-time Cup Series champion Jimmie Johnson, Rockenfeller, and 2009 Formula One world champion and NASCAR driver Jenson Button. On February 27, the car was confirmed to use the number 24 to honor Gordon.

The Garage 56 entry completed the 24 Hours of Le Mans despite experiencing transmission problems, finishing 39th out of the 62 cars entered.

=== Redesigns and rebrandings ===
On November 1, 2023, Ford Performance unveiled the new seventh generation Dark Horse body style for the 2024 season, replacing the sixth generation Mustang. On November 27, Toyota Racing Development revealed the XV80 body style for the Camry in 2024, replacing the XV70.

As the Camaro was discontinued after 2023 with no direct replacement, Chevrolet rebranded all Camaro-body stock cars as the ZL1 in 2025. In November 2025, Chevrolet unveiled a new body style for the ZL1 for the 2026 season. The redesign is based on the Camaro ZL1 Carbon Performance Package accessories kit.

On November 11, 2026, Ford unveiled the new Mustang body style based on the Dark Horse SC for the 2027 season.

=== Dodge's return ===
On November 2, 2026, Dodge announced its entry to the Cup Series in 2027 with Kaulig Racing, using the Charger body style. Dodge previously fielded cars in the Cup Series from 2001 to 2012, the year it won the drivers' championship with Keselowski and Team Penske.

== Models ==
Manufacturer	Chassis	Usage	Image	Notes
Chevrolet	Camaro ZL1	2022 –		Rebranded as the "ZL1" from 2025 onwards following the discontinuation of the production model Camaro in 2023.
Dodge	Charger	2027 –		
Ford	Mustang Dark Horse SC	2027 –		
Ford	Mustang Dark Horse	2024 – 2026		
Ford	Mustang GT	2022 – 2023		
Toyota	Camry XSE	2024 –		
Toyota	Camry TRD	2022 – 2023		

== Design ==
=== Aero and downforce packages ===
The Next Gen uses a stepped front splitter, aerodynamic vents on the hood, and a redesigned side skirt, all of which are designed to reduce the amount of side force in the cars. A notable addition to the Next Gen is the rear diffuser, which is set to be used in NASCAR for the first time. NASCAR has conducted various tests on the wind tunnel to have the car to generate more downforce using the rear diffuser. Adjustable aerodynamic components are also being used to accommodate the various track types in the schedule.

=== Technological improvements ===
==== Spec chassis ====
Despite initial reports that the Next Gen uses a carbon fiber tub, NASCAR engineer Brandon Thomas clarified that the car still uses a steel space frame, but with a modular setup to allow faster setups. Dallara was initially rumored to be the exclusive supplier of the new chassis, but it was revealed that Technique recently opened a shop in Concord, North Carolina, indicating that they manufactured the chassis for NASCAR teams.

==== Sequential transmission ====
The Next Gen replaced the traditional four-speed manual transmission with a five-speed Xtrac Limited sequential manual transmission, similar to the type of transmission used in contemporary race cars (e.g., touring cars).

==== Independent rear suspension ====
Much like the race cars used in IMSA, the Next Gen uses an independent rear suspension with 5-way adjustable Öhlins TTR dampers, instead of the solid rear axle used by previous generations.

==== New wheel design ====
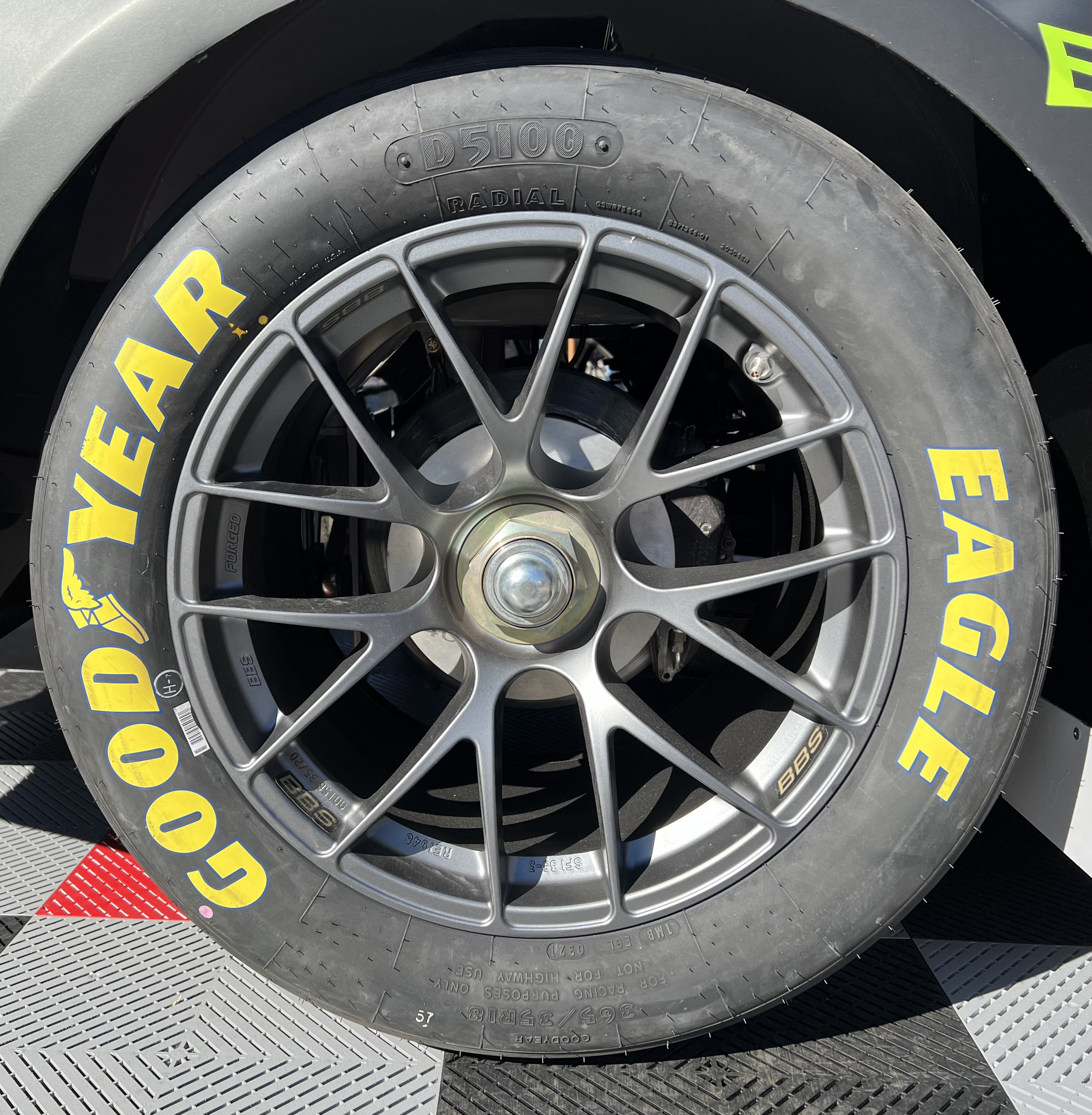
The single lug nut wheel used on Next Gen cars

On March 2, 2020, NASCAR announced that the traditional 15-inch steel wheel with the five-lug pattern was replaced by a new 18-inch aluminum wheel that uses a single center-locking lug nut. The wheels are manufactured by BBS. Prototypes tested before the announcement featured aluminum wheels, but with a five-lug pattern. Despite the reduction from five lug nuts to one, the extra torque required to secure the single lug nut has indicated that only a minimal effect is expected on pit stop timings.

Since its recent inception, the Next Gen has had several wheel related problems, such as loose lugnuts causing wheels to fall off. The wheel design also quickly began facing criticism for how thin the tires are, which has led to drivers getting stuck after blowing tires during a spin. Prior to the 2022 Daytona 500, NASCAR confiscated the wheels of Team Penske and RFK Racing. Roger Penske notified NASCAR that his team found inconsistencies on the wheels and modified the drive pin holes. After the race, NASCAR announced that the two teams would not be penalized after the organization discussed with Next Gen suppliers and several teams about the wheel specifications.

==== Mirrors ====
Aside from the standard rear and side mirrors, the Next Gen is now also equipped with a rear-facing camera, located just above the driver's rear window.

== Reception ==
Despite the safety concerns before and during the 2022 season that are still ongoing, the car has received generally good reviews from fans and drivers alike, with certain drivers, such as Brad Keselowski, enjoying the challenge that it brings with it being so hard to handle.

Additional criticism pertaining to the car's performance on short tracks and road courses has also become notable, which has resulted in NASCAR redesigning the car's aerodynamic, tire, and horsepower packages for both track types in an attempt to resolve such problems.

=== Safety concerns ===
On July 8, 2021, rumors started to speculate that the Next Gen would be delayed until 2023 or 2024. This started when Steve Hmiel confirmed that during crash testing, the dummy in the car was "killed". Hmiel stated that the car may have been too stiff and had too few crush zones. In response to the allegations, NASCAR said that the rumors had been happening for months. In a statement, NASCAR's John Probst said "[We] simulated some of the bigger incidents that we've had with the current Gen-6 car on the Next-Gen car. I'd say that we're pretty happy with where we're at. I won't get into the specifics of where we're at." On July 19, NASCAR announced that distribution of the Next Gen chassis would begin that week.

==== 2022 ====
Following the Daytona testing, drivers expressed concern over the interior heat due to the placement of the exhaust directly under the seat. To solve this, in November 2021 NASCAR added a front cooling duct to the cars (the front identification windshield was revised to allow for this change), among other changes.

During the first two races of 2022, drivers lost several laps after experiencing tire failures, as the new wheels lack inner liners and the cars sit lower to the ground, rendering them unable to drive back to pit road. As a temporary solution, NASCAR allowed cars to be towed back to pit road during a caution. Since the Next Gen car's inception, there have been several incidents when wheels fell off their cars on track, resulting in the crew chiefs of the affected teams being suspended for four races each. For 2023, NASCAR changed the penalty for drivers losing a wheel during the race to a two-lap penalty and two-race suspension to crew members.

Prior to the 2022 GEICO 500 at Talladega, several teams failed inspection; it was revealed that the high temperatures and the brightness of the sun caused the Lexan windshields to expand. Bob Pockrass reported that the sun altered car bodies anywhere from 0.08” to 0.2“

On July 24, 2022, Kurt Busch sustained a concussion from a crash during qualifying for the 2022 M&M's Fan Appreciation 400 at Pocono, a crash that would ultimately lead to his retirement at season's end. Since the accident, several drivers have opened up about the safety concerns of the Next Gen. Joey Logano and Corey LaJoie stated that the car's solid structure makes crashes more painful to drivers than the Gen-6. Following the 2022 Coke Zero Sugar 400 at Daytona, safety concerns began to focus more on rear-end impacts, as drivers complained they were the most painful to sustain during a crash.

After Kevin Harvick's car caught fire at the 2022 Cook Out Southern 500 at Darlington, NASCAR began an investigation on the cause of the fire, which had been a recurring problem throughout the season, particularly with Fords. In addition, Toyota examined the engines of Kyle Busch and Martin Truex Jr. after their cars experienced engine failures during the race. At the 2022 Autotrader EchoPark Automotive 500 at Texas, Cody Ware survived a hard crash, colliding with the turn 4 wall before violently hitting the pit wall. He sustained an impaction fracture on his ankle from the crash. At the same race, several teams suffered tire failures, which was explained by Harvick's crew chief Rodney Childers as due to practice of teams running lower tire pressures than Goodyear suggested in pursuit of speed due to restrictions on suspension shock travel in the new car, and Alex Bowman suffered from a concussion after a minor rear impact crash, further increasing safety concerns of the car. Bowman sat out of the remaining Round of 12 and Round of 8 races (eliminating himself from the playoffs), but was cleared to return at the 2022 NASCAR Cup Series Championship Race at Phoenix.

In the first 23 races of the 2022 season, drivers in the Cup Series scored a total of 151 DNFs - an increase by 56.6% compared to the 2021 season.

Denny Hamlin has called for NASCAR to redesign the Next Gen from scratch, as he believed there was no feasible way to solve the safety issues of the car's current iteration. On October 1, NASCAR announced that a new rear clip and rear bumper structure would undergo crash tests on October 5. Following the test, NASCAR held a meeting with drivers on October 8 and announced that changes to the rear bumper construction, rear chassis clip, and center chassis clip would be implemented for the 2023 season.

==== 2023 ====
During the overtime lap of the 2023 GEICO 500, Kyle Larson's car was t-boned by Ryan Preece in a collision triggered by Ross Chastain and Noah Gragson. The wreck collapsed Larson's passenger side roll cage, described by race winner Kyle Busch as "brick getting rammed into a stick of butter". Neither Larson nor Preece were injured; NASCAR took both cars to the R&D Center for further investigation. The results of NASCAR’s investigation led them to make changes to the front clip of the car, initially giving teams the option to remove the V brace under the hood ahead of the 2023 Coca-Cola 600 at Charlotte. Starting at the 2023 Quaker State 400 at Atlanta, NASCAR mandated a new front structure that allowed the front to crush more, similar to the changes made to the rear clip after 2022.

==== 2024 ====
During the 2024 FireKeepers Casino 400 at Michigan, Corey LaJoie's car went airborne and landed on its roof after spinning down the backstretch. In response to the incident, NASCAR mandated a new right side rear-window air deflector starting with the 2024 Coke Zero Sugar 400 at Daytona. However, despite these changes, with nine laps remaining in the race, Michael McDowell went airborne and nearly flipped in front of the field, but set back down onto its wheels. A few laps later, Josh Berry endured a similar crash to LaJoie’s, in which his car went airborne and landed upside down before colliding with the SAFER barrier of the inside wall, then continuing to spin on its roof. Following the race, NASCAR increased the size of the roof rail for the 2024 YellaWood 500 at Talladega, as well as adding fabric to the right side of the roof flaps to deflect as much air as possible and adding a skirt to the car’s rocker panel.
