= 2023 GEICO 500 =

NASCAR Cup Series race

Race details
- Race 10 of 36 in the 2023 NASCAR Cup Series
- Date: April 23, 2023
- Location: Talladega Superspeedway in Lincoln, Alabama
- Course: Permanent racing facility
- Course length: 2.66 miles (4.28 km)
- Distance: 196 laps, 521.36 mi (838.88 km)
- Scheduled distance: 188 laps, 500.08 mi (804.64 km)
- Average speed: 146.575 miles per hour (235.890 km/h)

Pole position
| Driver | Denny Hamlin | Joe Gibbs Racing |
- Time: 52.979

Most laps led
| Driver | Ryan Blaney | Team Penske |
- Laps: 47

Winner
| No. 8 | Kyle Busch | Richard Childress Racing |

Television in the United States
- Network: Fox
- Announcers: Mike Joy, Clint Bowyer, and Tony Stewart

Radio in the United States
- Radio: MRN
- Booth announcers: Alex Hayden and Jeff Striegle
- Turn announcers: Dave Moody (1 & 2), Mike Bagley (Backstretch), and Dillon Welch (3 & 4)

The 2023 GEICO 500 was a NASCAR Cup Series race held on April 23, 2023, at Talladega Superspeedway in Lincoln, Alabama. Contested over 196 laps – extended from 188 laps due to an overtime finish, on the 2.66 mile (4.28 km) superspeedway, it was the 10th race of the 2023 NASCAR Cup Series season.

== Report ==
=== Background ===
Talladega Superspeedway, the track where the race was held.

Talladega Superspeedway, formerly known as Alabama International Motor Speedway, is a motorsports complex located north of Talladega, Alabama. It is located on the former Anniston Air Force Base in the small city of Lincoln. A tri-oval, the track was constructed in 1969 by the International Speedway Corporation, a business controlled by the France family. Talladega is most known for its steep banking. The track currently hosts NASCAR's Cup Series, Xfinity Series and Craftsman Truck Series. Talladega is the longest NASCAR oval with a length of 2.66-mile-long (4.28 km) tri-oval like the Daytona International Speedway, which is 2.5-mile-long (4.0 km).

==== Entry list ====
- (R) denotes rookie driver.
- (i) denotes the driver ineligible for series driver points.

| No. | Driver | Team | Manufacturer |
|---|---|---|---|
| 1 | Ross Chastain | Trackhouse Racing | Chevrolet |
| 2 | Austin Cindric | Team Penske | Ford |
| 3 | Austin Dillon | Richard Childress Racing | Chevrolet |
| 4 | Kevin Harvick | Stewart-Haas Racing | Ford |
| 5 | Kyle Larson | Hendrick Motorsports | Chevrolet |
| 6 | Brad Keselowski | RFK Racing | Ford |
| 7 | Corey LaJoie | Spire Motorsports | Chevrolet |
| 8 | Kyle Busch | Richard Childress Racing | Chevrolet |
| 9 | Chase Elliott | Hendrick Motorsports | Chevrolet |
| 10 | Aric Almirola | Stewart-Haas Racing | Ford |
| 11 | Denny Hamlin | Joe Gibbs Racing | Toyota |
| 12 | Ryan Blaney | Team Penske | Ford |
| 14 | Chase Briscoe | Stewart-Haas Racing | Ford |
| 15 | Riley Herbst (i) | Rick Ware Racing | Ford |
| 16 | A. J. Allmendinger | Kaulig Racing | Chevrolet |
| 17 | Chris Buescher | RFK Racing | Ford |
| 19 | Martin Truex Jr. | Joe Gibbs Racing | Toyota |
| 20 | Christopher Bell | Joe Gibbs Racing | Toyota |
| 21 | Harrison Burton | Wood Brothers Racing | Ford |
| 22 | Joey Logano | Team Penske | Ford |
| 23 | Bubba Wallace | 23XI Racing | Toyota |
| 24 | William Byron | Hendrick Motorsports | Chevrolet |
| 31 | Justin Haley | Kaulig Racing | Chevrolet |
| 34 | Michael McDowell | Front Row Motorsports | Ford |
| 36 | Todd Gilliland | Front Row Motorsports | Ford |
| 38 | Zane Smith (i) | Front Row Motorsports | Ford |
| 41 | Ryan Preece | Stewart-Haas Racing | Ford |
| 42 | Noah Gragson (R) | Legacy Motor Club | Chevrolet |
| 43 | Erik Jones | Legacy Motor Club | Chevrolet |
| 45 | Tyler Reddick | 23XI Racing | Toyota |
| 47 | Ricky Stenhouse Jr. | JTG Daugherty Racing | Chevrolet |
| 48 | Alex Bowman | Hendrick Motorsports | Chevrolet |
| 51 | J. J. Yeley (i) | Rick Ware Racing | Ford |
| 54 | Ty Gibbs (R) | Joe Gibbs Racing | Toyota |
| 62 | Austin Hill (i) | Beard Motorsports | Chevrolet |
| 77 | Ty Dillon | Spire Motorsports | Chevrolet |
| 78 | B. J. McLeod | Live Fast Motorsports | Chevrolet |
| 99 | Daniel Suárez | Trackhouse Racing | Chevrolet |
Official entry list

== Qualifying ==
Denny Hamlin scored the pole for the race with a time of 52.979 and a speed of 180.751 mph (290.891 km/h).

=== Qualifying results ===
| Pos | No. | Driver | Team | Manufacturer | R1 | R2 |
|---|---|---|---|---|---|---|
| 1 | 11 | Denny Hamlin | Joe Gibbs Racing | Toyota | 53.308 | 52.979 |
| 2 | 10 | Aric Almirola | Stewart-Haas Racing | Ford | 53.309 | 53.011 |
| 3 | 54 | Ty Gibbs (R) | Joe Gibbs Racing | Toyota | 53.292 | 53.025 |
| 4 | 14 | Chase Briscoe | Stewart-Haas Racing | Ford | 53.280 | 53.085 |
| 5 | 12 | Ryan Blaney | Team Penske | Ford | 53.333 | 53.124 |
| 6 | 20 | Christopher Bell | Joe Gibbs Racing | Toyota | 53.388 | 53.245 |
| 7 | 19 | Martin Truex Jr. | Joe Gibbs Racing | Toyota | 53.315 | 53.281 |
| 8 | 22 | Joey Logano | Team Penske | Ford | 53.341 | 53.299 |
| 9 | 5 | Kyle Larson | Hendrick Motorsports | Chevrolet | 53.440 | 53.302 |
| 10 | 17 | Chris Buescher | RFK Racing | Ford | 53.417 | 53.303 |
| 11 | 4 | Kevin Harvick | Stewart-Haas Racing | Ford | 53.455 | — |
| 12 | 23 | Bubba Wallace | 23XI Racing | Toyota | 53.470 | — |
| 13 | 45 | Tyler Reddick | 23XI Racing | Toyota | 53.496 | — |
| 14 | 3 | Austin Dillon | Richard Childress Racing | Chevrolet | 53.497 | — |
| 15 | 2 | Austin Cindric | Team Penske | Ford | 53.499 | — |
| 16 | 41 | Ryan Preece | Stewart-Haas Racing | Ford | 53.509 | — |
| 17 | 8 | Kyle Busch | Richard Childress Racing | Chevrolet | 53.548 | — |
| 18 | 24 | William Byron | Hendrick Motorsports | Chevrolet | 53.559 | — |
| 19 | 16 | A. J. Allmendinger | Kaulig Racing | Chevrolet | 53.568 | — |
| 20 | 6 | Brad Keselowski | RFK Racing | Ford | 53.611 | — |
| 21 | 34 | Michael McDowell | Front Row Motorsports | Ford | 53.629 | — |
| 22 | 99 | Daniel Suárez | Trackhouse Racing | Chevrolet | 53.651 | — |
| 23 | 1 | Ross Chastain | Trackhouse Racing | Chevrolet | 53.671 | — |
| 24 | 43 | Erik Jones | Legacy Motor Club | Chevrolet | 53.693 | — |
| 25 | 21 | Harrison Burton | Wood Brothers Racing | Ford | 53.695 | — |
| 26 | 31 | Justin Haley | Kaulig Racing | Chevrolet | 53.745 | — |
| 27 | 48 | Alex Bowman | Hendrick Motorsports | Chevrolet | 53.750 | — |
| 28 | 36 | Todd Gilliland | Front Row Motorsports | Ford | 53.849 | — |
| 29 | 9 | Chase Elliott | Hendrick Motorsports | Chevrolet | 53.874 | — |
| 30 | 42 | Noah Gragson (R) | Legacy Motor Club | Chevrolet | 53.902 | — |
| 31 | 62 | Austin Hill (i) | Beard Motorsports | Chevrolet | 53.973 | — |
| 32 | 77 | Ty Dillon | Spire Motorsports | Chevrolet | 54.033 | — |
| 33 | 47 | Ricky Stenhouse Jr. | JTG Daugherty Racing | Chevrolet | 54.039 | — |
| 34 | 7 | Corey LaJoie | Spire Motorsports | Chevrolet | 54.059 | — |
| 35 | 38 | Zane Smith (i) | Front Row Motorsports | Ford | 54.063 | — |
| 36 | 15 | Riley Herbst (i) | Rick Ware Racing | Ford | 54.106 | — |
| 37 | 78 | B. J. McLeod | Live Fast Motorsports | Chevrolet | 54.297 | — |
| 38 | 51 | J. J. Yeley (i) | Rick Ware Racing | Ford | 54.424 | — |
Official qualifying results

== Race ==
During the overtime lap, Kyle Larson's car was t-boned by Ryan Preece in a collision triggered by Ross Chastain and Noah Gragson. The wreck collapsed Larson's passenger side roll cage, described by race winner Kyle Busch as "brick getting rammed into a stick of butter". Neither Larson nor Preece were injured from the collision, but the carnage reignited safety concerns regarding the Next Gen car. NASCAR took both cars to the R&D Center for further investigation.

=== Race results ===
==== Stage Results ====
Stage One Laps: 60

| Pos | No | Driver | Team | Manufacturer | Points |
|---|---|---|---|---|---|
| 1 | 9 | Chase Elliott | Hendrick Motorsports | Chevrolet | 10 |
| 2 | 48 | Alex Bowman | Hendrick Motorsports | Chevrolet | 9 |
| 3 | 1 | Ross Chastain | Trackhouse Racing | Chevrolet | 8 |
| 4 | 24 | William Byron | Hendrick Motorsports | Chevrolet | 7 |
| 5 | 5 | Kyle Larson | Hendrick Motorsports | Chevrolet | 6 |
| 6 | 2 | Austin Cindric | Team Penske | Ford | 5 |
| 7 | 42 | Noah Gragson (R) | Legacy Motor Club | Chevrolet | 4 |
| 8 | 22 | Joey Logano | Team Penske | Ford | 3 |
| 9 | 41 | Ryan Preece | Stewart-Haas Racing | Ford | 2 |
| 10 | 99 | Daniel Suárez | Trackhouse Racing | Chevrolet | 1 |
Official stage one results

Stage Two Laps: 60

| Pos | No | Driver | Team | Manufacturer | Points |
|---|---|---|---|---|---|
| 1 | 10 | Aric Almirola | Stewart-Haas Racing | Ford | 10 |
| 2 | 9 | Chase Elliott | Hendrick Motorsports | Chevrolet | 9 |
| 3 | 4 | Kevin Harvick | Stewart-Haas Racing | Ford | 8 |
| 4 | 23 | Bubba Wallace | 23XI Racing | Toyota | 7 |
| 5 | 21 | Harrison Burton | Wood Brothers Racing | Ford | 6 |
| 6 | 19 | Martin Truex Jr. | Joe Gibbs Racing | Toyota | 5 |
| 7 | 41 | Ryan Preece | Stewart-Haas Racing | Ford | 4 |
| 8 | 11 | Denny Hamlin | Joe Gibbs Racing | Toyota | 3 |
| 9 | 47 | Ricky Stenhouse Jr. | JTG Daugherty Racing | Chevrolet | 2 |
| 10 | 42 | Noah Gragson (R) | Legacy Motor Club | Chevrolet | 1 |
Official stage two results

=== Final Stage Results ===
Stage Three Laps: 68

| Pos | Grid | No | Driver | Team | Manufacturer | Laps | Points |
|---|---|---|---|---|---|---|---|
| 1 | 17 | 8 | Kyle Busch | Richard Childress Racing | Chevrolet | 196 | 40 |
| 2 | 5 | 12 | Ryan Blaney | Team Penske | Ford | 196 | 35 |
| 3 | 10 | 17 | Chris Buescher | RFK Racing | Ford | 196 | 34 |
| 4 | 4 | 14 | Chase Briscoe | Stewart-Haas Racing | Ford | 196 | 33 |
| 5 | 20 | 6 | Brad Keselowski | RFK Racing | Ford | 196 | 32 |
| 6 | 24 | 43 | Erik Jones | Legacy Motor Club | Chevrolet | 196 | 31 |
| 7 | 18 | 24 | William Byron | Hendrick Motorsports | Chevrolet | 196 | 37 |
| 8 | 6 | 20 | Christopher Bell | Joe Gibbs Racing | Toyota | 196 | 29 |
| 9 | 22 | 99 | Daniel Suárez | Trackhouse Racing | Chevrolet | 196 | 29 |
| 10 | 28 | 36 | Todd Gilliland | Front Row Motorsports | Ford | 196 | 27 |
| 11 | 38 | 51 | J. J. Yeley (i) | Rick Ware Racing | Ford | 196 | 0 |
| 12 | 29 | 9 | Chase Elliott | Hendrick Motorsports | Chevrolet | 196 | 44 |
| 13 | 27 | 48 | Alex Bowman | Hendrick Motorsports | Chevrolet | 196 | 33 |
| 14 | 32 | 77 | Ty Dillon | Spire Motorsports | Chevrolet | 196 | 23 |
| 15 | 33 | 47 | Ricky Stenhouse Jr. | JTG Daugherty Racing | Chevrolet | 196 | 23 |
| 16 | 13 | 45 | Tyler Reddick | 23XI Racing | Toyota | 196 | 21 |
| 17 | 1 | 11 | Denny Hamlin | Joe Gibbs Racing | Toyota | 196 | 23 |
| 18 | 37 | 78 | B. J. McLeod | Live Fast Motorsports | Chevrolet | 196 | 19 |
| 19 | 26 | 31 | Justin Haley | Kaulig Racing | Chevrolet | 196 | 18 |
| 20 | 36 | 15 | Riley Herbst (i) | Rick Ware Racing | Ford | 196 | 0 |
| 21 | 11 | 4 | Kevin Harvick | Stewart-Haas Racing | Ford | 196 | 24 |
| 22 | 2 | 10 | Aric Almirola | Stewart-Haas Racing | Ford | 196 | 25 |
| 23 | 23 | 1 | Ross Chastain | Trackhouse Racing | Chevrolet | 196 | 23 |
| 24 | 31 | 62 | Austin Hill (i) | Beard Motorsports | Chevrolet | 196 | 0 |
| 25 | 34 | 7 | Corey LaJoie | Spire Motorsports | Chevrolet | 196 | 13 |
| 26 | 15 | 2 | Austin Cindric | Team Penske | Ford | 196 | 16 |
| 27 | 7 | 19 | Martin Truex Jr. | Joe Gibbs Racing | Toyota | 196 | 15 |
| 28 | 12 | 23 | Bubba Wallace | 23XI Racing | Toyota | 195 | 16 |
| 29 | 19 | 16 | A. J. Allmendinger | Kaulig Racing | Chevrolet | 195 | 8 |
| 30 | 8 | 22 | Joey Logano | Team Penske | Ford | 195 | 10 |
| 31 | 3 | 54 | Ty Gibbs (R) | Joe Gibbs Racing | Toyota | 194 | 6 |
| 32 | 30 | 42 | Noah Gragson (R) | Legacy Motor Club | Chevrolet | 189 | 10 |
| 33 | 9 | 5 | Kyle Larson | Hendrick Motorsports | Chevrolet | 189 | 10 |
| 34 | 16 | 41 | Ryan Preece | Stewart-Haas Racing | Ford | 189 | 9 |
| 35 | 21 | 34 | Michael McDowell | Front Row Motorsports | Ford | 189 | 2 |
| 36 | 25 | 21 | Harrison Burton | Wood Brothers Racing | Ford | 183 | 7 |
| 37 | 35 | 38 | Zane Smith (i) | Front Row Motorsports | Ford | 141 | 0 |
| 38 | 14 | 3 | Austin Dillon | Richard Childress Racing | Chevrolet | 141 | 1 |
Official race results

=== Race statistics ===
- Lead changes: 57 among 21 different drivers
- Cautions/Laps: 8 for 34
- Red flags: 0
- Time of race: 3 hours, 33 minutes, and 25 seconds
- Average speed: 146.575 miles per hour (235.890 km/h)

== Media ==
=== Television ===
Fox Sports covered their 23rd race at the Talladega Superspeedway. Mike Joy, Clint Bowyer and 2008 fall Talladega winner Tony Stewart called the race from the broadcast booth. Jamie Little, Regan Smith and Josh Sims handled the pit road for the television side. Larry McReynolds provided insight from the Fox Sports studio in Charlotte.

Fox
| Booth announcers | Pit reporters | In-race analyst |
|---|---|---|
| Lap-by-lap: Mike Joy; Color-commentator: Clint Bowyer; Color-commentator: Tony Stewart | Jamie Little; Regan Smith; Josh Sims | Larry McReynolds |

=== Radio ===
MRN had the radio call for the race which was also simulcasted on Sirius XM NASCAR Radio. Alex Hayden & Jeff Striegle called the race in the booth when the field raced through the tri-oval. Dave Moody called the race from the Sunoco spotters stand outside turn 2 when the field raced through turns 1 and 2. Mike Bagley called the race from a platform inside the backstretch when the field raced down the backstretch & Dillon Welch called the race from the Sunoco spotters stand outside turn 4 when the field raced through turns 3 and 4. Steve Post, Georgia Henneberry, Chris Wilner and Brienne Pedigo worked pit road for the radio side for MRN.

MRN Radio
| Booth announcers | Turn announcers | Pit reporters |
|---|---|---|
| Lead announcer: Alex Hayden; Announcer: Jeff Striegle | Turns 1 & 2: Dave Moody; Backstretch: Mike Bagley; Turns 3 & 4: Dillon Welch | Steve Post; Georgia Henneberry; Chris Wilner; Brienne Pedigo |

== Standings after the race ==
Drivers' Championship standings

| | Pos | Driver | Points |
|---|---|---|---|
| | 1 | Christopher Bell | 331 |
| | 2 | Ross Chastain | 319 (–12) |
| | 3 | Kevin Harvick | 311 (–20) |
| | 4 | Kyle Larson | 295 (–36) |
| 3 | 5 | Kyle Busch | 290 (–41) |
| | 6 | Tyler Reddick | 286 (–45) |
| 2 | 7 | Martin Truex Jr. | 281 (–50) |
| 2 | 8 | Ryan Blaney | 276 (–55) |
| 2 | 9 | Alex Bowman | 270 (–61) |
| 1 | 10 | Denny Hamlin | 270 (–61) |
| 4 | 11 | Joey Logano | 268 (–63) |
| | 12 | Brad Keselowski | 267 (–64) |
| | 13 | Ricky Stenhouse Jr. | 247 (–84) |
| 1 | 14 | William Byron | 245 (–86) |
| 1 | 15 | Chase Briscoe | 243 (–88) |
| | 16 | Chris Buescher | 240 (–91) |
Official driver's standings

Manufacturers' Championship standings

| Pos | Manufacturer | Points |
|---|---|---|
| 1 | Chevrolet | 382 |
| 2 | Toyota | 342 (–40) |
| 3 | Ford | 338 (–44) |

- Note: Only the first 16 positions are included for the driver standings.
- . – Driver has clinched a position in the NASCAR Cup Series playoffs.

| Previous race: 2023 NOCO 400 | NASCAR Cup Series; 2023 season | Next race: 2023 Würth 400 |
