= Generation 6 (NASCAR) =

Common name for the car that was used in the NASCAR Cup Series from 2013 to 2021

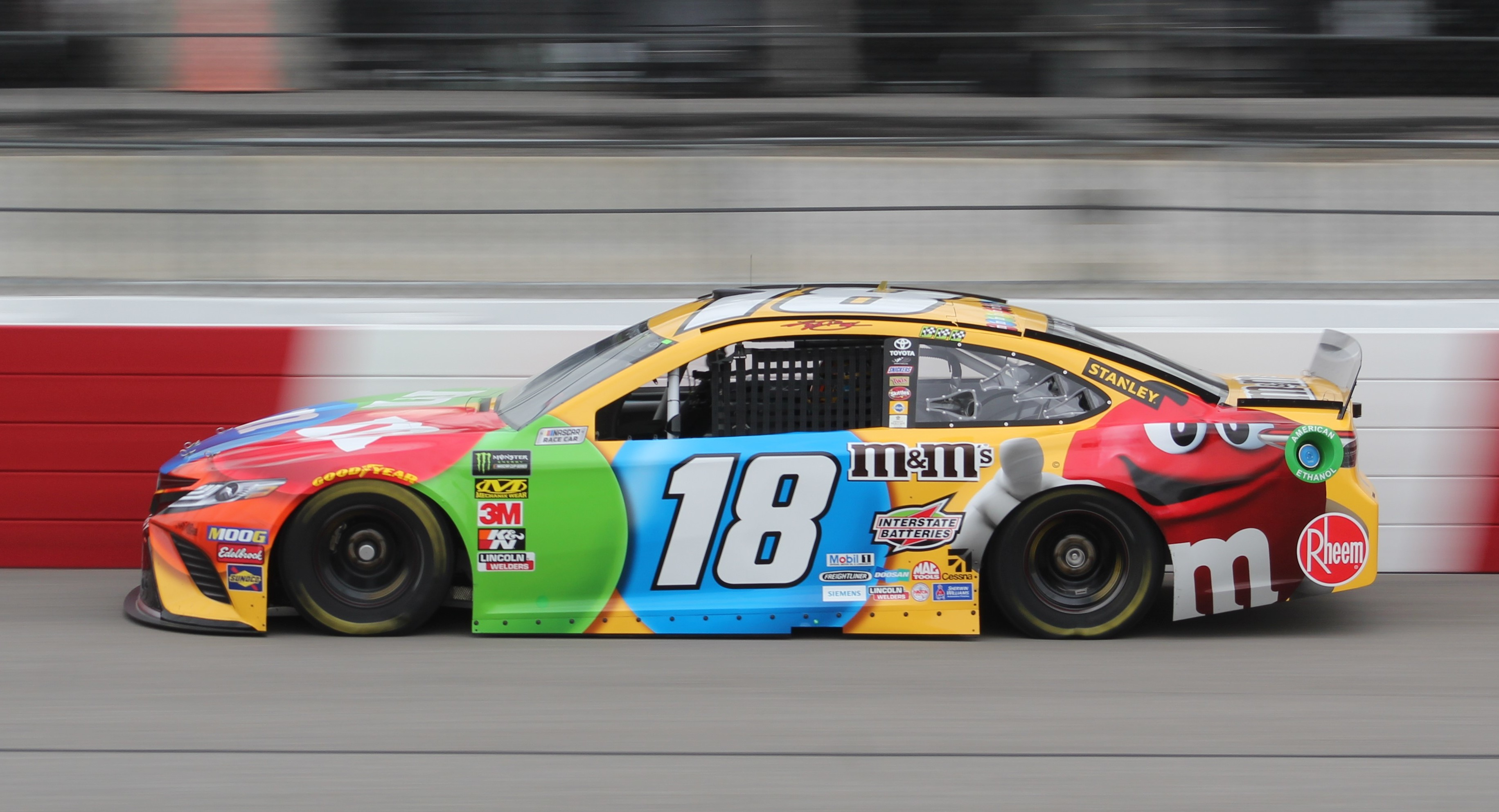
- Kyle Busch's 2019 Toyota Camry at Richmond Raceway
- Category: NASCAR Cup Series
- Constructor: (United States) Chevrolet (United States) Ford (Japan) Toyota
- Predecessor: Car of Tomorrow
- Successor: Next Gen (2022)

Technical specifications
- Chassis: Steel tube frame with integral safety roll cage
- Wheelbase: 110 in (2,794 mm)
- Engine: Chevrolet R07 (2013-2021), Ford FR9 (2013-2021), and TRD Phase-14 (2013–2021) 5.86 L (358 cu in) V8 Naturally-aspirated FR layout
- Transmission: 4 forward speeds + 1 reverse manual
- Weight: 3,200 lb (1,451 kg) minimum without driver and fuel 3,400 lb (1,542 kg) minimum with driver and fuel
- Fuel: Sunoco Green E15 98 octane race fuel
- Tires: Goodyear

Competition history
- Debut: February 24, 2013 (2013 Daytona 500)
- Last event: November 7, 2021 (2021 NASCAR Cup Series Championship Race)

The Generation 6 car, shortened to Gen-6, was the common name for the car that was used in the NASCAR Cup Series from 2013 to 2021. The car was part of a project to make NASCAR stock cars look more like their street-legal counterparts. The cars have used many different aero and downforce packages to improve their racing characteristics as well as using the safety measures of its predecessor, the Car of Tomorrow. The Generation 6 car has received both praise and criticism from fans and drivers.

The Generation 6 body style was introduced in the 2013 Daytona 500 and was originally scheduled to be retired after 2020 in favor of the new Next Gen car. However, due to the COVID-19 pandemic, the implementation of the Next Gen car was pushed to 2022.

== History ==
In 2013, NASCAR allowed the car manufacturers to design a brand new body style for the COT chassis so that they would better resemble the street legal versions of what the sport's fans could purchase and drive. Another hope of the Generation 6 car was that it would give more grip and speed to the drivers and more great racing action to the fans.

== Models ==
| Manufacturer | Chassis | Usage | Image |
|---|---|---|---|
| Chevrolet | SS | 2013–2017 | |
| Chevrolet | Camaro ZL1 | 2018–2021 | |
| Ford | Fusion | 2013–2018 | |
| Ford | Mustang | 2019–2021 | |
| Toyota | Camry | 2013–2021 | |

== Design ==
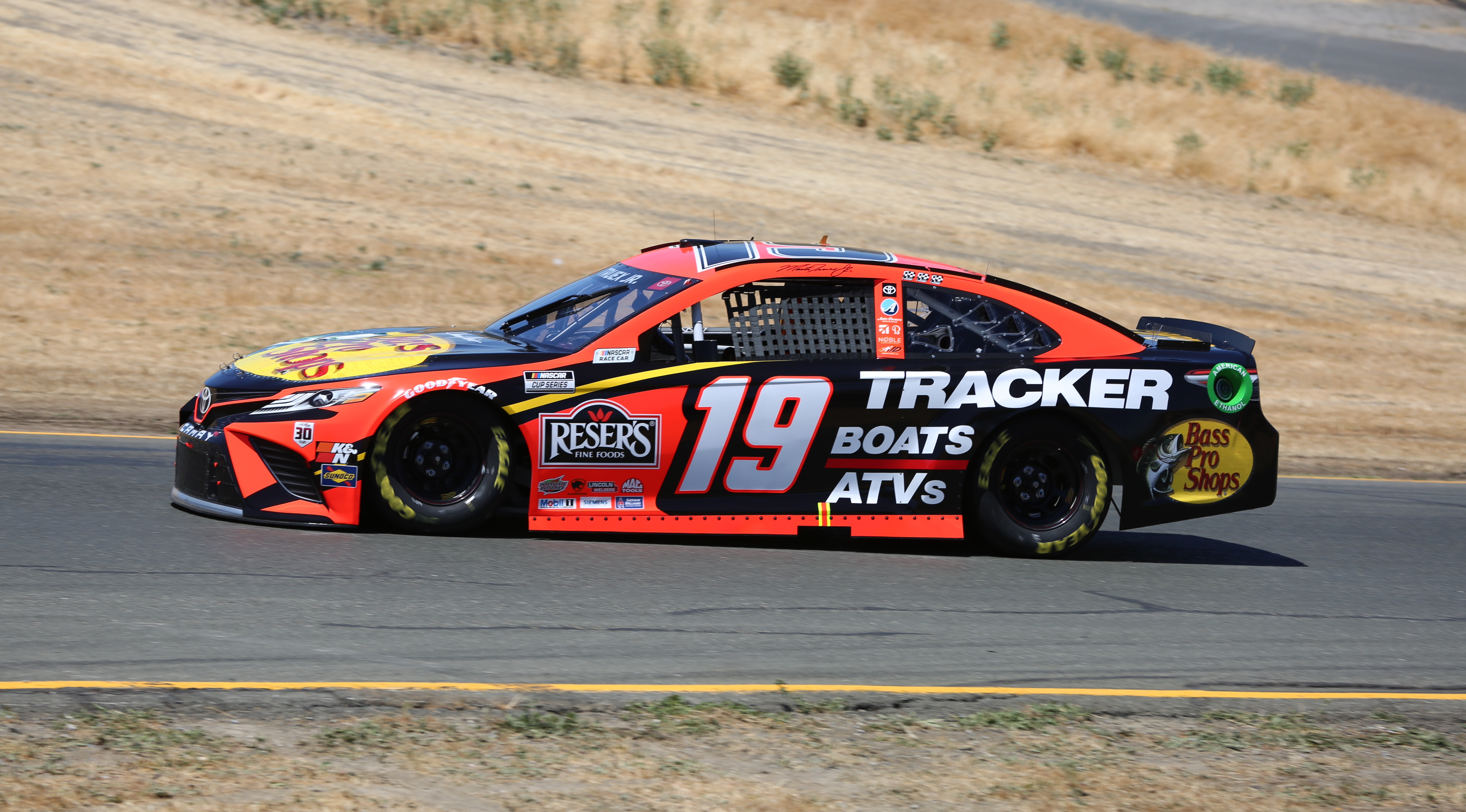
Martin Truex Jr.'s 2021 Toyota Camry (XV70) at Sonoma Raceway

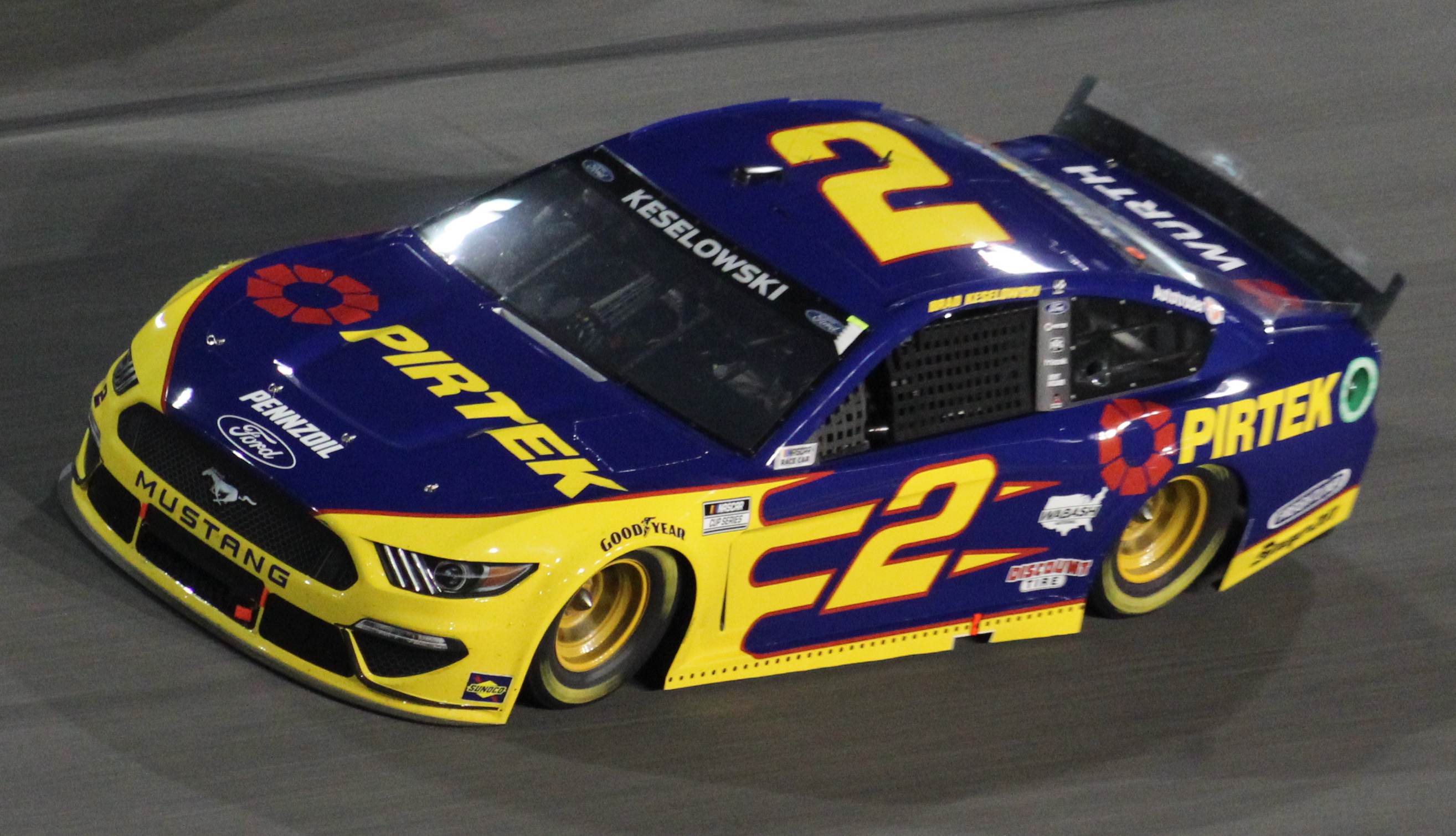
Brad Keselowski's 2021 Ford Mustang GT at Daytona International Speedway

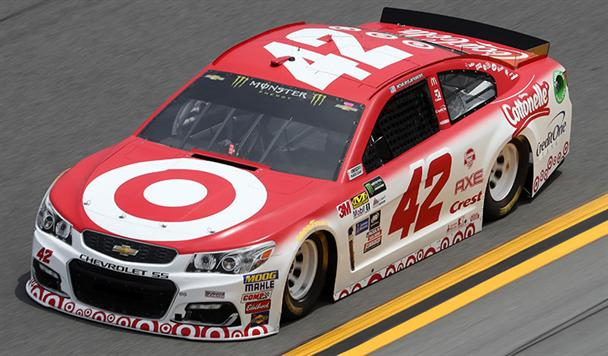
Kyle Larson's 2017 Chevrolet SS

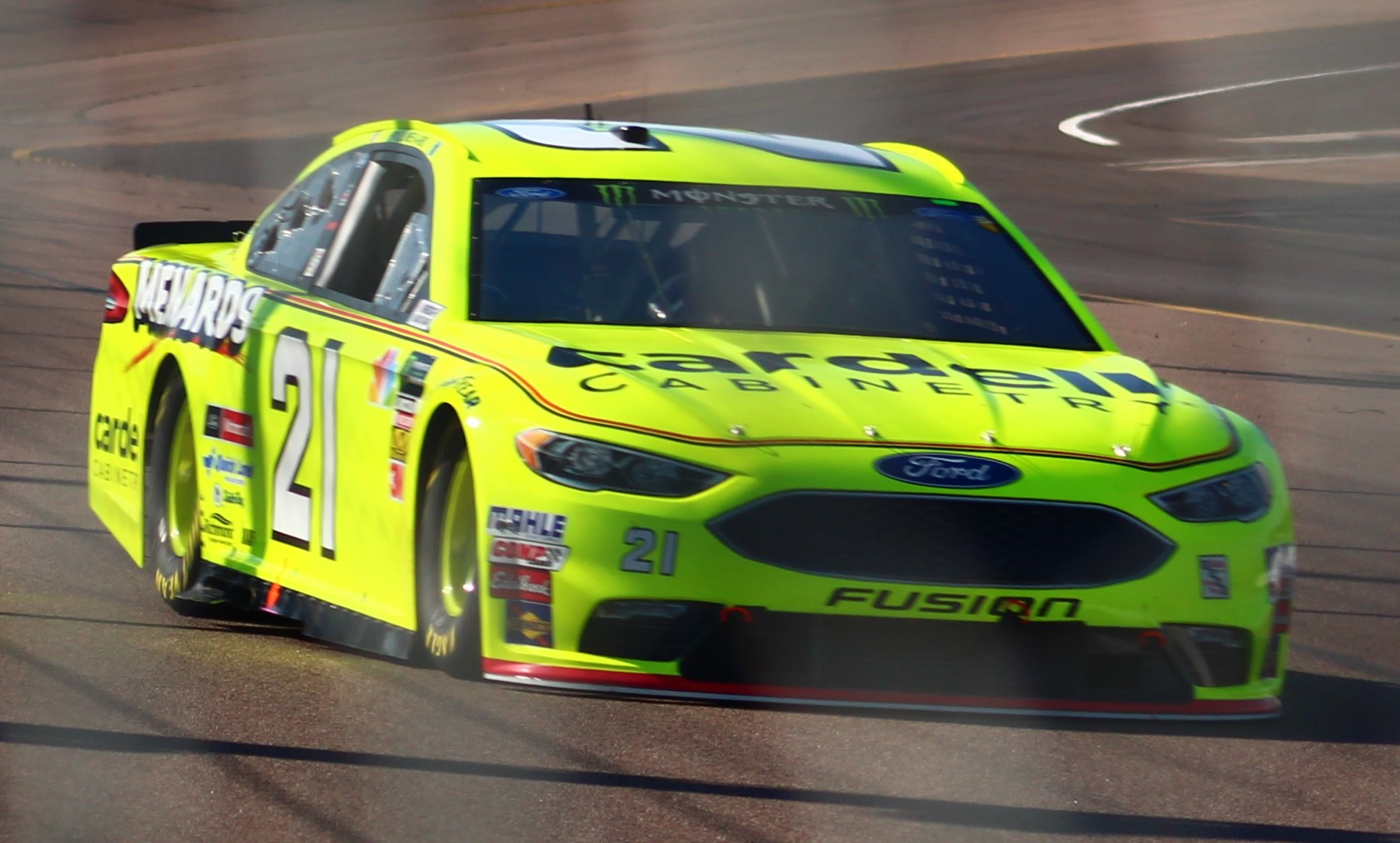
Paul Menard's 2018 Ford Fusion at Phoenix Raceway

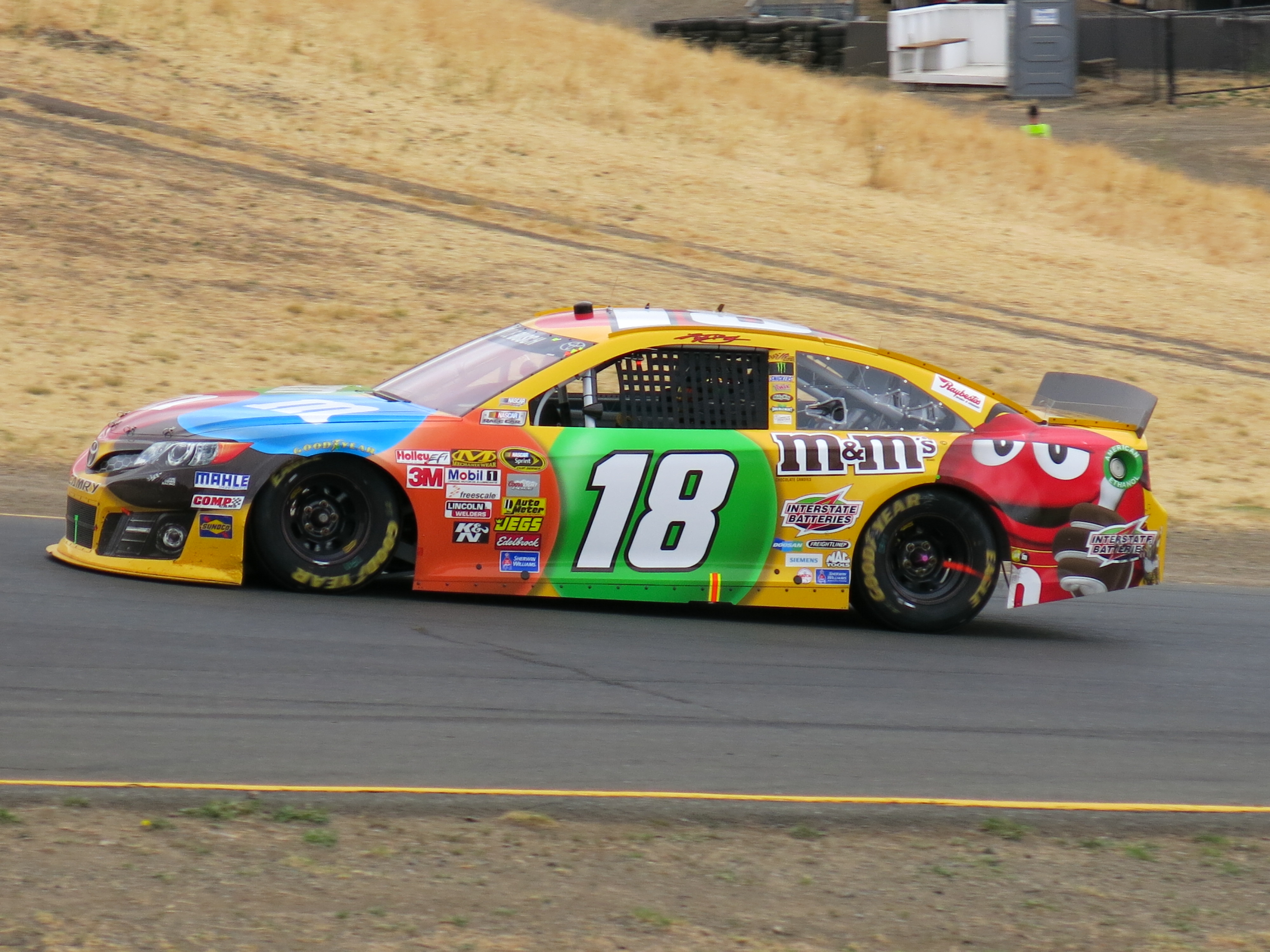
Kyle Busch's 2013 Toyota Camry (XV50)

During the 2012 season, it was announced that Ford would use the new second generation Fusion, Toyota would continue to use the 2013 Camry, while Chevrolet would use the Chevrolet SS (a rebadged Holden Commodore), replacing the Chevrolet Impala. Dodge announced they would use the Charger. However, soon after, Dodge announced its withdrawal from the Cup Series, after being unable to convince other teams into switching to Dodge to replace Team Penske (which returned to Ford in 2013).

For the 2015 season, Toyota updated its body to match the 2015 Camry, marking the first vehicle design change since the adoption of the Generation 6 body. Two seasons later, Toyota updated its body to match the new 2018 Camry.

Following the closure of General Motors' Elizabeth, South Australia plant and the discontinuation of the Holden VF Commodore (effectively ending production of the Chevrolet SS), Chevrolet announced on August 10, 2017, that it would be using the 2018 Camaro ZL1 starting with the 2018 season. The Camaro was the brand's first coupe-based entry since the Monte Carlo was retired in 2007.

On April 17, 2018, Ford announced that the Mustang GT would replace the Fusion in the 2019 season. This was the manufacturer's first coupe-based entry since the Ford Thunderbird was retired from NASCAR in 1998.

=== Aero and downforce packages ===
Throughout the 2014, 2015, and 2016 seasons, NASCAR implemented different downforce and aero packages to promote passing and give their fans more interesting racing.

The car had a low downforce package at the 2015 Quaker State 400 at Kentucky Speedway and another at the 2015 Bojangles' Southern 500 at Darlington Raceway. This package took 1,000 pounds of downforce away from the car. The cars had a high downforce package in July for the 2015 Brickyard 400 and in Michigan. These races saw almost no action and the down force package was criticized by the many fans. Martin Truex Jr. told USA Today: "We could run anybody down and get to them, but it took a long time to pass cars. It was just so damn hard to pass. I could run a guy down from way back and get to him and about spin out. It’s no fun to race like that. We had a car that could have contended with the 20 (Kenseth) today and just couldn’t ever get there."

The major differences between the 2015 and 2016 cars are the shortened spoiler and splitter to give the car less downforce and therefore grip in the turns. Following year's base package includes a 3.5-inch spoiler (currently six inches), a 0.25-inch front leading splitter edge (currently two inches) and a 33-inch wide radiator pan (currently 38 inches; it was 28 inches at the Darlington and Kentucky races).

To improve passing on high-speed tracks, aero ducts were implemented for the 2017 Indiana 250 to alleviate the drag rise on a close trailing car.

=== Safety improvements ===
The Generation 6 car features additions of forward roof bar and center roof support bar to the roll cage to reinforce integrity and increase the crush structure of the roof. Larger roof flaps help to keep the car on the ground to prevent it from flipping whilst going backward at high speeds.

Despite these safety improvements, there have still been multiple instances of the Gen-6 car flipping during high-speed crashes. At the 2015 Coke Zero 400 at Daytona, Austin Dillon's car went airborne during a multiple car pileup on the final lap and ripped the catchfence. Five spectators were injured while Dillon walked away with a bruised tailbone and forearm. On the final lap of the 2020 Daytona 500, Ryan Newman's car was spun out by Ryan Blaney, sending it to the frontstretch wall and in the air before being broadsided on the driver's side by Corey LaJoie on its way down. Newman survived the crash and was hospitalized, but suffered only minor head injury.

=== Technological improvements ===
==== New body panels ====
The car's new hood and deck lid are composed of carbon fiber. To alleviate carbon fiber's tendency to splinter and shatter with extreme impacts, Kevlar is incorporated. With the exception of the carbon fiber rear deck lid, all body panels are produced by the manufacturer and individually stamped for verification.

==== Digital dashboard ====
In a move to make race cars closer in style and appearance to modern street vehicles, all NASCAR Cup Series cars began utilizing a digital dash sold by McLaren in 2016. This dash includes 16 customizable preset screens, allowing the driver to monitor all the previous info with several additional elements such as lap time and engine diagnostics, for a total of 24 data elements. Information can be displayed as a gauge, numeral, bar graph or LED.

Future plans for the display capabilities include information such as flag status, restart order and penalties, allowing all such information to be available instantly to the driver. Ultimately, NASCAR could use the digital dash to transmit driver biometrics and provide information to the fans. It is NASCAR's position, however, not to move toward real time telemetry.

== Performance ==
Of the 23 tracks NASCAR used the Generation 6 car on, the car set new track records at 16 of them. Despite not setting a new track record at Daytona International Speedway, Danica Patrick's No. 10 car was one of the closest since the restrictor plate era began. Because the Las Vegas qualifying session was rained out, it can be said the car set records at 16 of the 23 tracks possible.

The Generation 6 car also provided a margin of victory between drivers of 1.267 seconds, the lowest since 2005.

== Reception ==
=== Drivers ===
Although the car was liked by drivers such as Jeff Gordon, other drivers were critical about the new car. At the 2013 Subway Fresh Fit 500, Denny Hamlin rallied from the rear to third place where he finished. He commented on how the newer Generation 6 cars were too difficult to pass with. Hamlin stated: "I don't want to be the pessimist, but it did not race as good as our generation 5 or regular CoT cars did." Comments from drivers, like Hamlin, were also similar to those said when the Car of Tomorrow came out. Many drivers stated that it was hard for the teams to figure out how to get the aerodynamics correctly balanced.

Hamlin was fined $25,000 for his comments on the new Generation 6 car. NASCAR spokesperson Kenny Tharp stated, "While NASCAR gives its competitors ample leeway in voicing their opinions when it comes to a wide range of aspects about the sport, the sanctioning body will not tolerate publicly made comments by its drivers that denigrate the racing product."

=== Fans ===
Fan response to the new body design was positive, as the perception that the race cars in the Cup Series "are cars that I would be interested in buying" increased from 49 percent to 76 percent. However, towards the end of the Generation 6's tenure, many fans, drivers, and team owners became dissatisfied with the car, in part because of several rule changes made by NASCAR affecting the performance of the car.

=== Teams: Price point factors ===
The Car of Tomorrow had roughly $10,000 in sheet metal per car, which is $5,000 less in comparison to the $15,000 worth of sheet metal of the Generation 6 car. On average, a well-funded team produces about 50 bodies per car which could lead to a possible issue of being over the estimated budget for this particular category.

Additionally, multiple new requirements, such as a new rear camber (which meant new suspension components) were also introduced. NASCAR's new weight rules required a new lighter weight chassis (although in practice existing Car of Tomorrow chassis remained compatible). Those changes came with a hefty price, as they increased the cost per car by $500,000 for the season. Including the other changes, the total cost for the season per car was estimated to have increased by $750,000 over the Car of Tomorrow. The price increase led then-team owner/driver Tony Stewart to tell reporter Marty Smith the Gen-6 car is financially "great for NASCAR, not for the owner. There's a lot of added cost, a lot of parts that are a lot more expensive than in the past. But racers are very resourceful. These teams will find a way to make it work."

== Successor ==
For 2022, NASCAR replaced the Generation 6 car with the all-new Next Gen car. The rules package of the 2019 season served as the starting point of the new car's development. In addition, the Next Gen car is meant to attract new original equipment manufacturers (OEMs) to compete with Chevrolet, Ford, and Toyota. The Next Gen car was tested at Richmond Raceway with Austin Dillon on October 8 and 9, at Phoenix Raceway with Joey Logano on December 9 and 10, at Homestead–Miami Speedway with Erik Jones on January 15 and 16, and at Auto Club Speedway with William Byron on March 2–3. The test car was built by Richard Childress Racing and used a generic body. The Next Gen car was originally set to debut at the 2021 Daytona 500; the Gen-6 car would be used for the 2021 Busch Clash, held on Daytona's road course configuration.
