= Compacted graphite iron =

Ferrous alloy

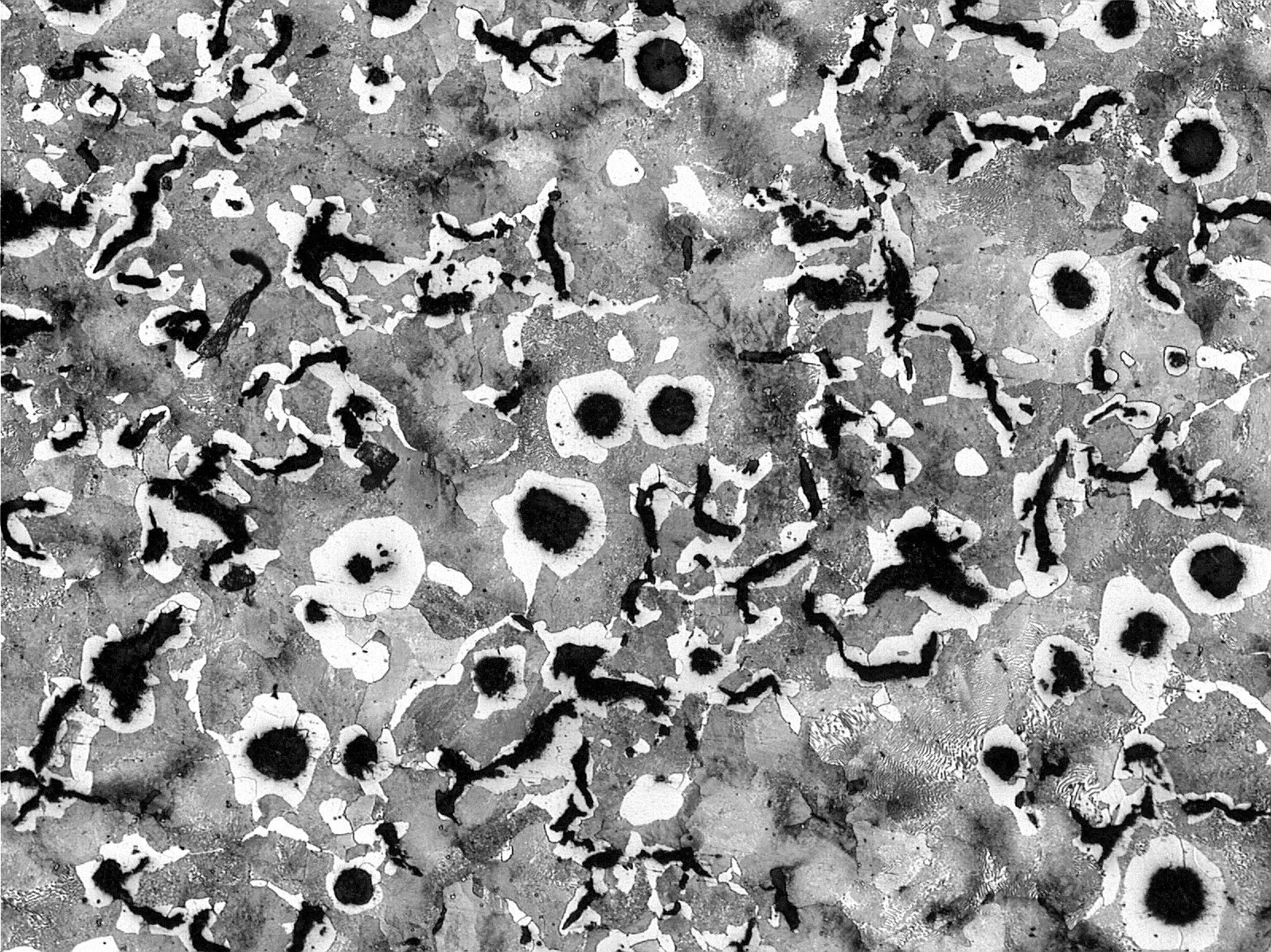
GJV at a magnification of 100:1

Compacted graphite iron (CGI), also known as vermicular graphite iron (GJV, VG, JV or GGV from the German: "Gusseisen mit Vermiculargraphit") especially in non-English speaking countries, is a metal which is gaining popularity in applications that require either greater strength, or lower weight than cast iron.

R.D. Schelleng obtained a patent for the production of compacted graphite iron in 1965.

== Metallurgy ==
The graphite in compacted graphite iron differs in structure from that in gray iron because the graphite particles are shorter and thicker.

== Applications ==
The first commercial application for compacted graphite iron was for the brake discs for high-speed trains.

More recently compacted graphite iron has been used for engine blocks. It has proven to be useful in the manufacture of V topology diesel engines where the loading on the block is very high between the cylinder banks, and for heavy goods vehicles which use diesel engines with high combustion pressures.

It is also used for turbo housings and exhaust manifolds, in the latter case to reduce corrosion.

It is also used in NASCAR engine blocks.

== See also ==
- Malleable iron
- Ductile iron
