= Michael Waltrip =

American racing driver, sports announcer, and businessman (born 1963)

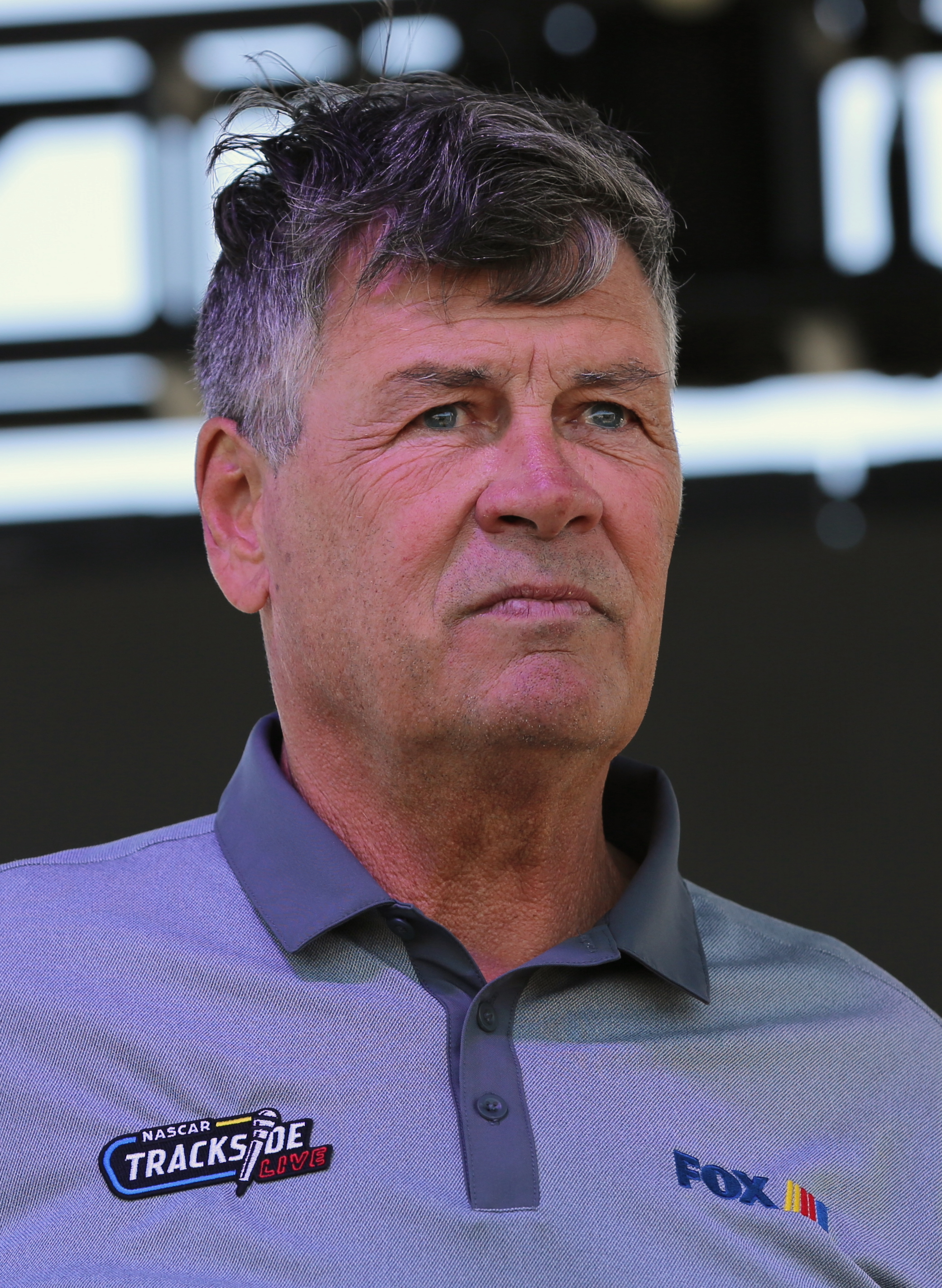
- Waltrip at Las Vegas Motor Speedway in 2026
- Born: Michael Curtis Waltrip; April 30, 1963 (age 63); Owensboro, Kentucky, U.S.
- Height: 6 ft 5 in (1.96 m)
- Weight: 210 lb (95 kg)
- Achievements: 1983 Darlington Dash Series champion 1996 The Winston Select winner 2001, 2003 Daytona 500 winner 2002, 2005 Gatorade Duel Winner
- Awards: 1983, 1984 Darlington Dash Series Most Popular Driver

NASCAR Cup Series career
- 784 races run over 33 years
- 2017 position: 38th
- Best finish: 12th (1994, 1995)
- First race: 1985 Coca-Cola World 600 (Charlotte)
- Last race: 2017 Daytona 500 (Daytona)
- First win: 2001 Daytona 500 (Daytona)
- Last win: 2003 EA Sports 500 (Talladega)
Wins	Top tens	Poles
4	133	4

NASCAR O'Reilly Auto Parts Series career
- 279 races run over 22 years
- Best finish: 13th (2004)
- First race: 1988 Kroger 200 (IRP)
- Last race: 2011 Aaron's 312 (Talladega)
- First win: 1988 Grand National 200 (Dover)
- Last win: 2004 Pepsi 300 (Nashville)
Wins	Top tens	Poles
11	105	14

NASCAR FedEx Freight Truck Series career
- 9 races run over 6 years
- Best finish: 61st (2004)
- First race: 1996 Carquest 420K (Las Vegas)
- Last race: 2011 NextEra Energy Resources 250 (Daytona)
- First win: 2011 NextEra Energy Resources 250 (Daytona)
Wins	Top tens	Poles
1	4	0

24 Hours of Le Mans career
- Years: 2011
- Teams: AF Corse
- Best finish: DNF in LMGTE-PRO (2011)
- Class wins: 0
- Statistics up to date as of February 25, 2017.

Michael Curtis "Mikey" Waltrip (born April 30, 1963) is an American former professional stock car racing driver, racing commentator, racing team owner, amateur ballroom dancing competitor and published author. He is the younger brother of three-time NASCAR champion and racing commentator Darrell Waltrip. Waltrip is a two-time winner of the Daytona 500, having won the race in 2001 and 2003. He is also a pre-race analyst for the NASCAR Cup Series and color commentator for the Xfinity Series and the Craftsman Truck Series broadcasts for Fox Sports. He last raced in the 2017 Daytona 500, driving the No. 15 Toyota Camry for Premium Motorsports. All four of his NASCAR Cup Series wins came on superspeedways driving for Dale Earnhardt Inc..

== Racing career ==
=== Beginnings ===
According to his autobiography Blink of An Eye, Waltrip's career started at the age of twelve when he phoned his older brother Darrell Waltrip, who was racing in the 1978 Daytona 500. Michael asked Darrell to help him build a career in NASCAR, but Darrell advised him to stay focused on school. Michael then obtained assistance from his older brother Bobby Waltrip, who was very close to him in their childhood. Michael began building a career by racing go-karts at carnivals and various racing clubs around his hometown. He won many races and, thanks to Bobby's help, was noticed by Dale Earnhardt. When Waltrip moved out of his house, he moved in with Kyle Petty and then ultimately lived with Richard Petty as a roommate. When Michael explained to Petty that he was going to try the Busch Series (now the O'Reilly Auto Parts Series) to build his NASCAR career, Petty told Michael he was "wasting his time" and advised that Michael should immediately go for the Cup Series ride.

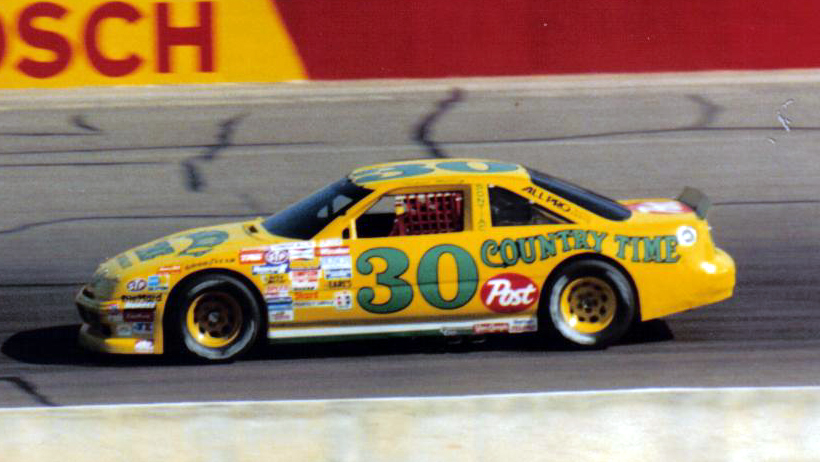
1989 car

Waltrip's stock car career got off the ground in 1981, when he captured the Mini-Modified division track championship at Kentucky Motor Speedway. A year later, Waltrip entered the Goody's Dash Series, where he won the series championship in 1983 and was voted the circuit's most popular driver that year and in 1984.

Waltrip made his Cup debut in 1985 in the Coca-Cola 600 at Charlotte, driving for Dick Bahre. He finished 28th in that race and finished 57th in the series standings after just five starts. His brother Darrell won the race. At the same time, Waltrip got confronted by Earnhardt, who questioned a previous move early in the race in which Waltrip nudged him out of the way and Dale responded by flipping the bird.

=== 1986–90 ===
In 1986, driving the No. 23 car for Bahari Racing, Waltrip finished second in the Rookie of the Year standings to Alan Kulwicki on the strength of a pair of eleventh-place finishes at Martinsville and Pocono. The following season, he posted his first career top-ten finish when he ended up tenth in Martinsville's spring race. In 1988, Waltrip began running Busch Series events, making five starts for his brother's team. He took the checkered flag for the first time at Dover in his fourth start. Waltrip competed in the 1988 Goodyear NASCAR 500 at the Calder Park Thunderdome in Australia, finishing fourteenth. He returned to the track later that year for the NASCAR Christmas 500, where he finished 28th due to engine issues less than 100 laps into the race. 1988 also saw Waltrip score his first Winston Cup top-five finish in the No. 30 Country Time Lemonade/Kool-Aid-sponsored Pontiac.

==== Crash at Bristol Motor Speedway ====
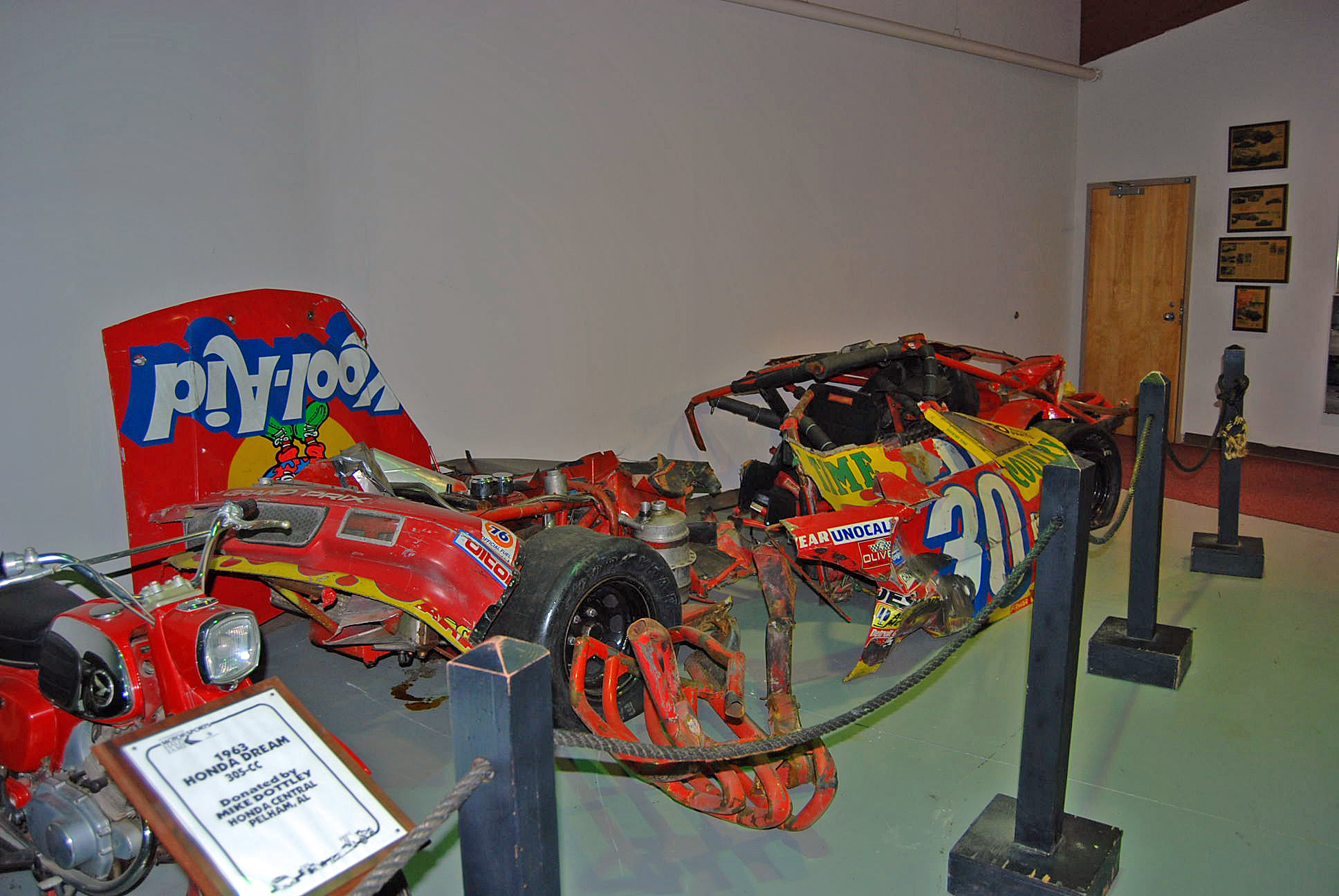
The remains of Waltrip's 1990 Kool-Aid sponsored Busch Series car after his accident at Bristol.

For Waltrip, 1990 was notable for a horrific crash at Bristol in the spring on the 170th lap of the Budweiser 250, where he destroyed his Busch Series Pontiac Grand Prix. After making contact with Robert Pressley in the No. 59, he hit a gate that was in the outside wall at the exit of turn two. The gate was used to allow vehicles in and out of the infield because the track did not have a tunnel. The impact broke the gate, and Michael went head-on into the end of the wall, disintegrating the car on impact and collapsing the car into itself. Onlookers were sure that Waltrip was severely injured, perhaps fatally, because of how massive the impact was and his brother Darrell rushed to the wreck fearing the worst. Amazingly, Waltrip not only survived the accident but he only suffered minor cuts, soreness, and bruises in the wreck. After Mike Harmon had an almost identical impact several years later (and also amazingly walked away), the gate was moved down to just before the entrance of turn 3, thus lessening the chance of a car hitting it because cars are diving away from the wall at that point. Later, when asked about the crash by Ken Squier, he replied saying he had "some contusions and a little bit of confusion" and ended with "Hope we did a good job for Kool-Aid." Years later, Waltrip said that at first, he thought that Pressley wrecked him on purpose, and thought about fighting him after the incident before thinking better of it.

=== 1991–2000 ===
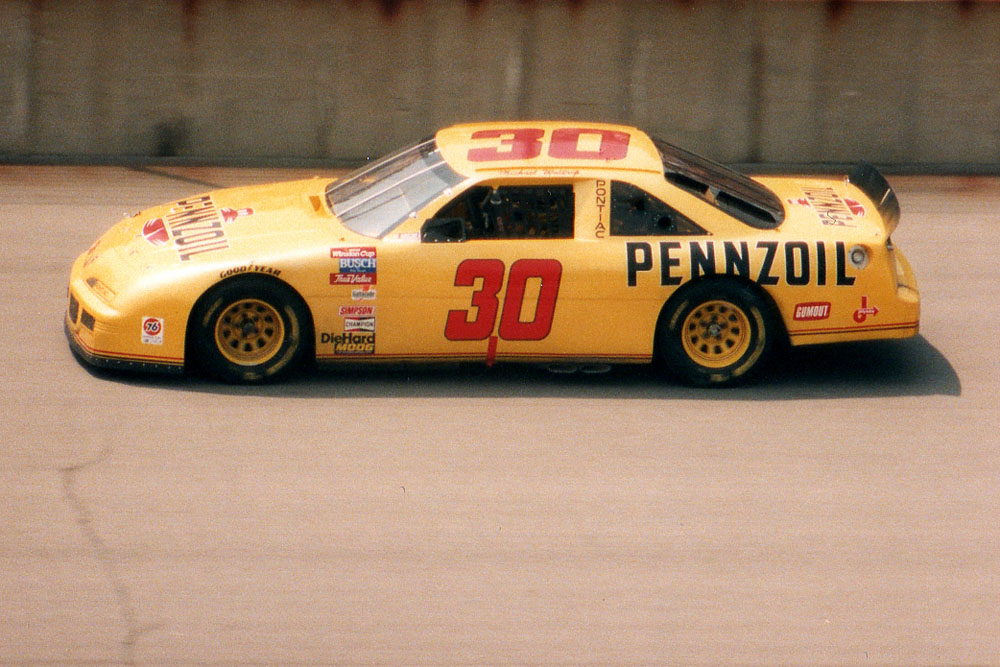
Waltrip driving for Bahari in 1994

In 1991, he gained new sponsorship from Pennzoil and won the Winston Open, as well as his first two career pole positions. He came close to winning the 1991 TranSouth 500 at Darlington, but a jammed air hose on his final visit to the pits caused his stop to last 37.4 seconds, costing him the victory. He stayed with the Bahari team until the end of 1995 when he was replaced by rookie Johnny Benson. He joined Wood Brothers Racing to drive their No. 21 Citgo-sponsored Ford. He won the 1996 edition of The Winston after capturing the last transfer spot in The Winston Open. After posting one top-five finish over three years, and missing his first race since 1986 at the 1998 Dura Lube/Kmart 500, Waltrip departed the Wood Brothers at the end of 1998 to drive the No. 7 Philips-sponsored Chevrolet for Mattei Motorsports, posting three top-ten finishes and ending that season 29th in points. However, mid-season the ownership of the team transferred from Mattei to Ultra Motorsports and Jim Smith. The next season, Nations Rent replaced Philips as the sponsor & Waltrip moved up to 27th in points but only finished in the top-five once, causing him and the team to part ways at the end of the season. Waltrip would later say in his 2011 book, In the Blink of an Eye, that 1999 and 2000 were the most disappointing years of his racing career and he began to lose hope that he would ever win a Cup Series race.

=== 2001–05 ===
Waltrip was hired by Dale Earnhardt to drive his team's new No. 15 NAPA Auto Parts-sponsored Chevrolet Monte Carlo entry, Waltrip drove for Earnhardt in the Busch Series in 1989 and 1994. In his first race with the team, the 2001 Daytona 500, Waltrip broke his streak of 462 consecutive Cup races without a victory and won his first career points-paying Cup race. His teammate Dale Earnhardt Jr. finished in 2nd. However, the win itself was largely overshadowed by Earnhardt, Sr.'s fatal crash on the last lap. In the movie The Day: Remembering Dale Earnhardt, Waltrip said that Earnhardt let him in line late in the race, which allowed him to take the lead, noting that Earnhardt "never let anyone in line". This presumably is because Earnhardt wanted Waltrip and Earnhardt Jr. to finish in the Top 2 spots, as both were members of his team. Waltrip was not aware of the severity of Earnhardt's crash until over 30 minutes after the end of the race when he was celebrating in victory lane. Ken Schrader, after having been treated and released from the infield care center following the crash (his car hit Earnhardt's car during the crash), informed Waltrip that Earnhardt had been taken to Halifax Medical Center, 2 miles (3.2 km) from the speedway, where Earnhardt was pronounced dead at 5:16 PM EST.

Waltrip would later say in his book, and a 2019 podcast episode with Earnhardt Jr., that in the aftermath of the tragedy, he and the No. 15 team pushed forward to continue Earnhardt's legacy, "Because we knew we had to." However, his results slumped in the aftermath of the disaster, and he realized after six races that he was "not in a good place." By June 2001, his crew chief, Scott Eggleston, left the team and was replaced by longtime DEI director Steve Hmiel.

Waltrip did not have another top-ten finish that season until returning to Daytona in July in the Pepsi 400, where he finished second while holding off the field as teammate Earnhardt Jr. won his first plate race. Earnhardt Jr.'s Pepsi 400 finish was emotional to the entire DEI team and when Earnhardt Jr. did his burnout on the infield grass, Waltrip pulled up alongside him. Waltrip would later say to Kenny Wallace on his podcast in 2021, that the moment with Earnhardt Jr. in the infield was "even bigger than any races I've won, and I didn't even win." Waltrip would also have a second-place finish at Homestead with Bill Elliott winning and finished 24th in the standings.

The next season, Waltrip won the second Gatorade Duel. His next top ten finish would be a second-place finish at Talladega, where he and Earnhardt Jr. combined to lead more than two-thirds of the race, with Earnhardt Jr. taking home his second of four straight wins at Talladega. The following week, Waltrip finished tenth at Auto Club. He had eighth-place finishes in the Coca-Cola 600 at Charlotte and the first Pocono race, and fourth place in the first Michigan race. He picked up his second career win at the Pepsi 400 at Daytona. After a ninth-place finish at Watkins Glen, and eighth-place finishes at New Hampshire and Talladega, Waltrip finished 14th in the points standings.

In 2003, Waltrip won a rain-shortened Daytona 500 and also took victory at the EA Sports 500 at Talladega (his only non-Daytona win), while running in the top-five for most of the season before falling back to fifteenth in points. Of trivial note, Waltrip won the first three NASCAR on Fox races at Daytona (2001 and 2003 Daytona 500s, and the 2002 Pepsi 400) with Michael's brother Darrell in the broadcast booth. His Talladega win was also his only win at a NASCAR on NBC race.

During the 71st lap of the 2004 Daytona 500, Waltrip was involved in a violent flip as part of a twelve car crash. Waltrip was on the outside of three wide under Brian Vickers and Johnny Sauter when Sauter and Vickers made contact and squeezed Waltrip into the outside backstretch wall. Vickers spun across Waltrip's nose and Waltrip spun down and into Robby Gordon. The impact into Gordon broke Waltrip's left-rear wheel and the car dug into the wet infield grass that got rained on the previous night and sent Waltrip flipping over violently 3 times while kicking up dirt before coming to a rest on its roof. Several minutes later, Waltrip would climb out of the car unhurt after the crews turned his car back over for him to climb out. In 2004, Waltrip went winless and dropped five spots in the standings. In 2005 Waltrip only had seven top tens and one pole. It included a runner-up at Phoenix despite hitting the wall on the next to last lap. He had an incident with Robby Gordon at New Hampshire. After Waltrip intentionally wrecked Robby Gordon and spun as a result, Gordon furiously tried to back his damaged racecar into Waltrip's. When Gordon failed to hit Waltrip's car with his own, he climbed out of his racecar and threw his helmet at Waltrip's driver-side door. Waltrip repeated the words Gordon said the previous year in another helmet-tossing incident: "He just threw a helmet at my car." Waltrip was fined $10,000 (equivalent to US$17,045 in 2025) after he gestured at Gordon for the damage on his car from the helmet, but he and Teresa Earnhardt appealed and the fine was overturned after a short investigation proved the charge false. Gordon however was fined $50,000 (equivalent to US$85,227 in 2025) and put on probation for the rest of the year after he was discovered to have said "You know everybody thinks Michael is this good guy. He's not the guy he acts he is. The caution was out, and he wrecked me, and he's a piece of shit." Waltrip and Gordon conferred later on, apologized, and continued their careers. After the 2005 season, Waltrip left DEI for Bill Davis Racing.

=== 2006–2017 ===
==== 2006 ====
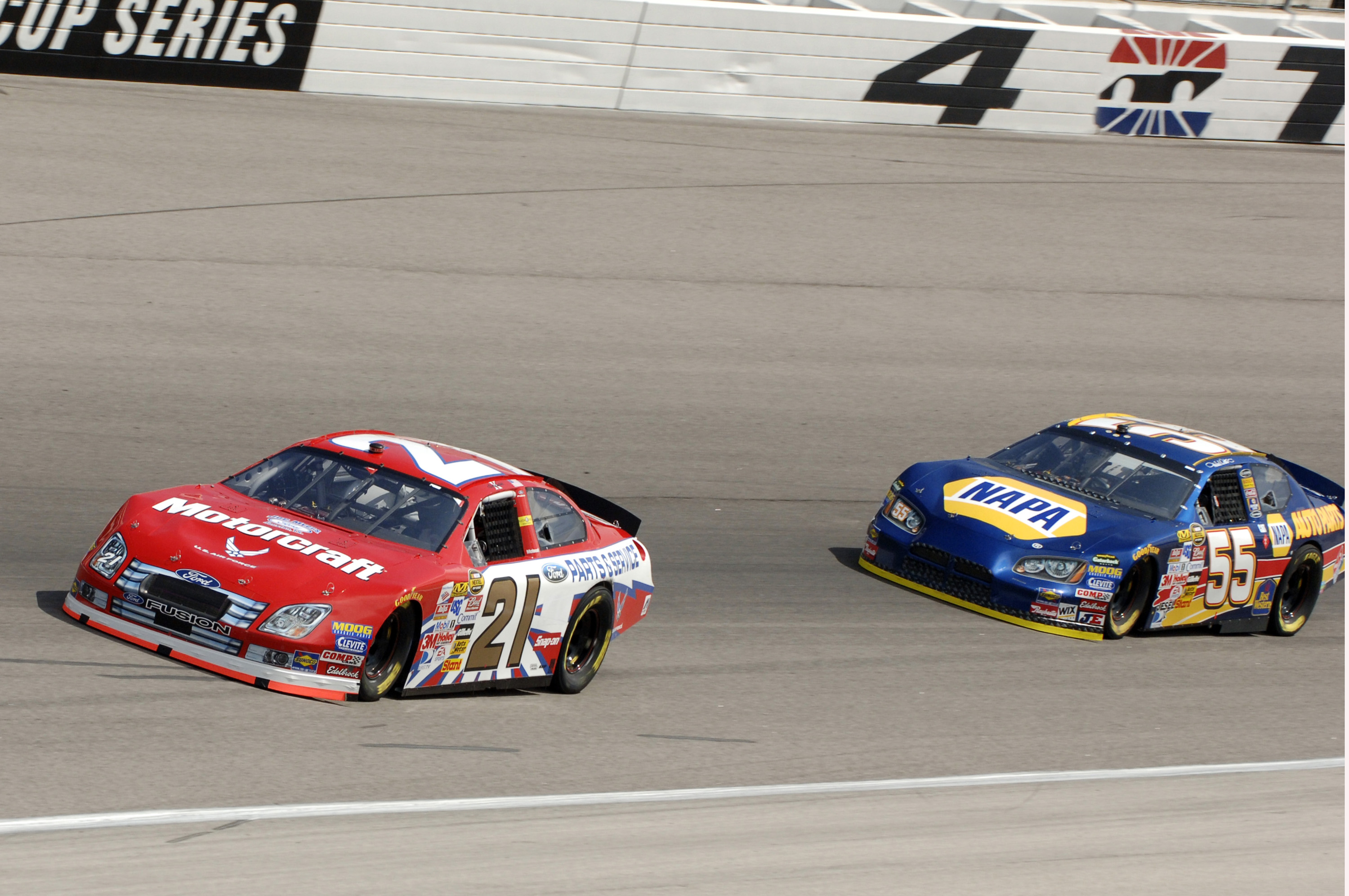
Michael Waltrip's No. 55 NAPA Dodge (right) in 2006

On January 20, 2006, Waltrip and Doug Bawel, who owned Penske Racing's No. 77 car in 2005, announced the forming of Waltrip-Jasper Racing. Because Waltrip was under contract with Bill Davis Racing, they reached a deal with BDR to oversee and supply the new team. Waltrip-Jasper fielded the No. 55 NAPA Auto Parts Dodge in the 2006 Nextel Cup Series, driven by Waltrip, with Bawel as listed owner, and Davis as a team executive. Bawel had a guaranteed starting spot in the first five races of 2006 by the No. 77 finishing 34th in the 2005 owner points, although Bawel was shutting down his team and needed a driver to pick up his team's owner points. This arrangement enabled Waltrip to make the first five races in 2006 without qualifying on time. After the first five races, this was unnecessary. Waltrip failed to qualify for the first time since 1998 at the Coca-Cola 600. He bought a slot from the No. 74 McGlynn Racing Dodge from Derrike Cope to drive in the race and to keep his streak of 262 consecutive races. Waltrip ended up missing three races total in 2006 and did not have a top-ten finish. This was attributable to BDR's lawsuit with Dodge, which meant the team did not receive manufacturer support for Waltrip or teammate Dave Blaney.

Waltrip left Bill Davis Racing to form his own Nextel Cup team in 2007.

==== 2007 ====
Waltrip moved his Busch Series team, Michael Waltrip Racing, to the Cup Series full-time for the 2007 season. He hired Dale Jarrett and David Reutimann to race in the three-car operation. Reutimann in the No. 00, Jarrett in the No. 44, and Waltrip in the No. 55. Waltrip was listed as the owner of the No. 44 and No. 55, while his wife Buffy was listed as the owner of the No. 00.

After the first round of qualifying for the 2007 Daytona 500, NASCAR inspectors found evidence in the engine intake manifold that Waltrip, Reutimann, and Jarrett's teams had used an illegal unspecified oxygenate fuel additive to increase performance. NASCAR confiscated the cars, forcing Waltrip, Reutimann, and Jarrett to move to back-up cars for the Daytona 500. On February 14, 2007, NASCAR officials announced at a press conference the penalties that would be levied: Bobby Kennedy (Director of Competition for Michael Waltrip Racing) and David Hyder (Waltrip's crew chief) were removed from Daytona International Speedway, and suspended indefinitely. David Hyder was also fined $100,000 (equivalent to US$155,272 in 2025) and was placed on a leave of absence, eventually to be released by the team in April. Waltrip, Reutimann, and Jarrett were docked one-hundred driver points and Waltrip and Buffy were docked 100 owner points each. Waltrip, Reutimann, and Jarrett's initial qualifying times were disallowed, but Waltrip and Reutimann were permitted to attempt to qualify by racing a backup car in their Gatorade Duel's qualifying race for the Daytona 500. Jarrett would qualify using his Past Champions provisional from his 1999 title, but was also permitted to race a backup car in his Gatorade Duel. Waltrip's interim crew chief was announced as Scott Eggleston, who was Waltrip's former crew chief in 2001. After a 30th-place finish in the Daytona 500, Waltrip became the first driver in series history to go into the second race of the season with a negative number of points (−27). Waltrip failed to qualify for the next eleven races following the Daytona 500, so he maintained his negative point total for almost four months. He qualified for the thirteenth race of the season at Dover and finished 28th, moving his point total above zero to 52 points.

On Saturday, April 7, 2007, Waltrip fell asleep behind the wheel of his Toyota Land Cruiser which overturned and hit a utility pole. Waltrip crawled out from the car suffering only minor cuts. There was no Nextel Cup race held that weekend. He was charged with reckless driving and failing to report an accident.

After failing to qualify for the Pocono 500 in June, Waltrip bounced back the following week by finishing tenth at the Citizens Bank 400 in Michigan.

During the summer, Waltrip decided to make changes to the No. 00 and No. 55, which both sat outside the top-35 in owners points. He hired Terry Labonte, who held an automatic qualifying spot with his Past Champions provisional from titles in 1984 and 1996, to take over Waltrip's No. 55 at Infineon Raceway, Watkins Glen International, and Indianapolis Motor Speedway. Waltrip also hired P. J. Jones, a road course ringer, to take over David Reutimann's No. 00 at Infineon and Watkins Glen.

In October 2007, before the 2007 Bank of America 500. Dale Jarrett announced his retirement from points racing after the 2008 Food City 500, Waltrip decided to put David Reutimann (No. 00 driver) to take over the No. 44. Jarrett's final race was the All-Star race in May 2008.

On October 6, 2007, Waltrip won the pole for the UAW-Ford 500 at Talladega Superspeedway, the first restrictor-plate race to be run with the Car of Tomorrow. He finished 25th after a wreck but bounced back the next week at Charlotte Motor Speedway with his second top-ten finish of the season.

==== 2008 ====
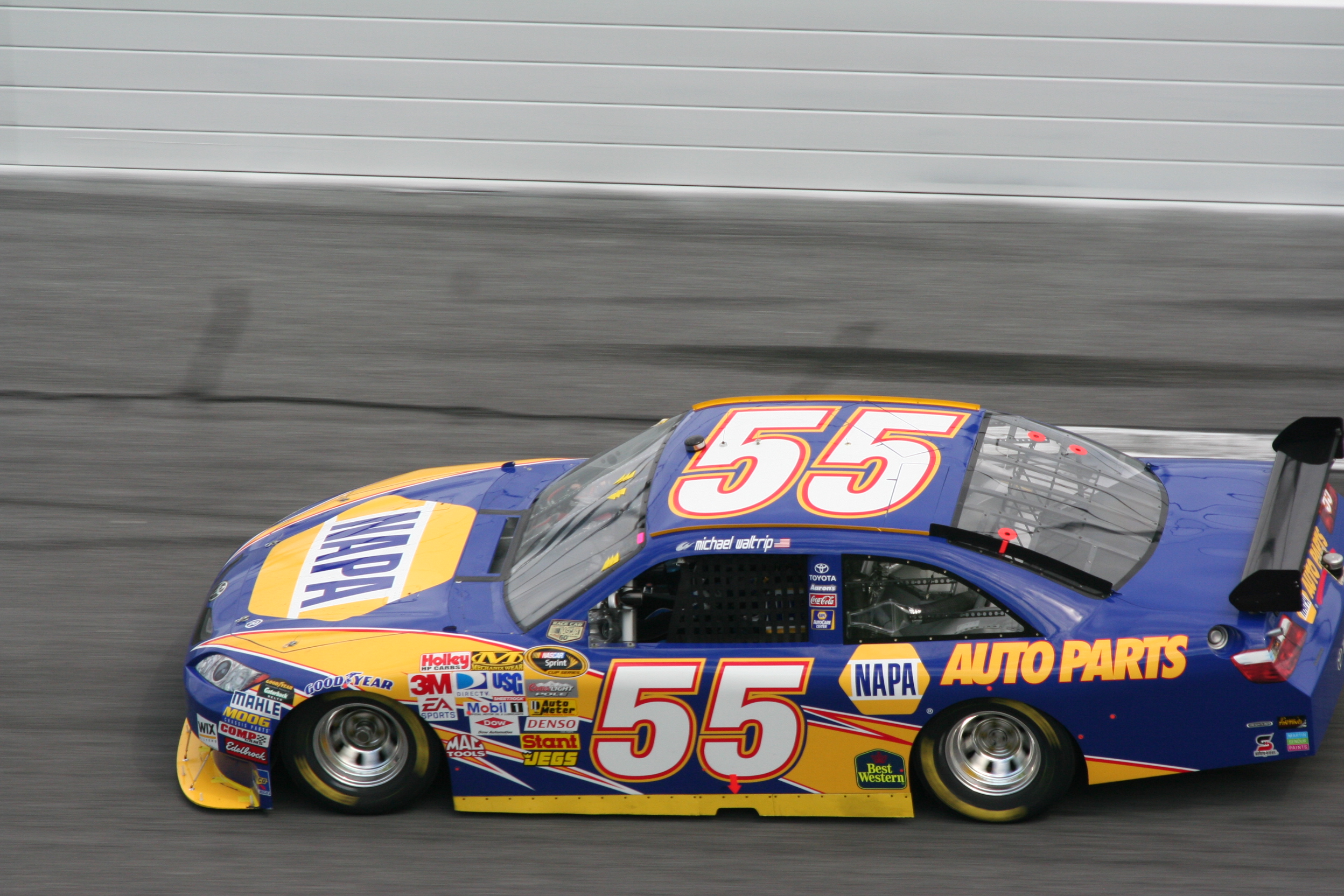
Waltrip's 2008 car at Daytona

In 2008, Michael Waltrip Racing changed following the disappointing 2007 campaign. Waltrip welcomed business owner Robert Kaufmann, owner/founder of the Fortress Investment Group and was made an equal partner and got more aid with real estate developer Johnny Harris buying into the team during the 2007 off-season. Former Cup owner Cal Wells was brought to MWR to oversee day-to-day operations, Dale Jarrett No. 44 retiring from points racing after the 2008 Food City 500, David Reutimann starting the season in the No. 00 then taking over Jarrett's No. 44, while Michael McDowell took over Reutimann's No. 00. Waltrip entered three full-time cars for 2008 David Reutimann/Michael McDowell/Mike Skinner/Kenny Wallace/A. J. Allmendinger and Mike Bliss No. 00, Dale Jarrett/David Reutimann No. 44 and Waltrip No. 55. On February 10, 2008, Michael qualified second for the 50th running of the Daytona 500, which guaranteed him a second-place start in the race. Waltrip started the race with "gold wheels" on his car in tribute to the golden anniversary of the Daytona 500; after the race, the wheels were signed and sold to benefit NASCAR charities. After leading the first two laps, he was not a factor in the race and finished 26th. Waltrip finished second at New Hampshire's Lenox Industrial Tools 301. He made his 1,000th NASCAR touring series start at Atlanta in October. He is second to Richard Petty in most career starts spanning all of the top divisions in NASCAR.

However, Michael McDowell struggled to keep the car in the Top 35 in owner points, which is necessary for automatic qualification into each race, and Waltrip replaced him with Mike Skinner, Kenny Wallace, A. J. Allmendinger and Mike Bliss to reclaim a top-35 spot. In October 2008, MWR transferred its third team to the No. 47 Toyota of JTG Daugherty Racing, driven by Marcos Ambrose, and discontinued the No. 00 team for the balance of the season.

At the end of 2008, MWR sold the No. 44 to Richard Petty Motorsports and contracted to two cars with David Reutimann moving back to the No. 00, Waltrip in the No. 55.

==== 2009 ====
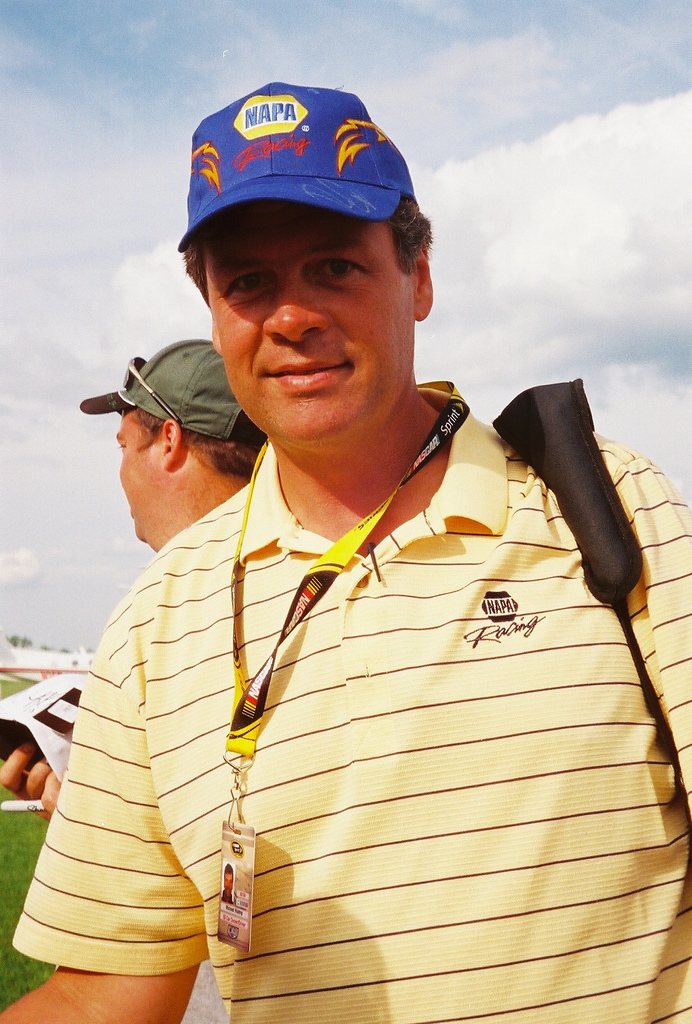
Waltrip in 2008

Waltrip entered two full-time cars for 2009 David Reutimann No. 00, Waltrip No. 55. In early 2009, Waltrip announced that he would be sharing the No. 99 NNS Aaron's dream machine with David Reutimann and Scott Speed during the season. On May 25, 2009, Waltrip scored his first win as an owner in Sprint Cup Series competition in the Coca-Cola 600, with David Reutimann winning the event.

In the 2009 season, Waltrip garnered two top-ten finishes (Daytona and Talladega) He came within a few laps of winning his third Daytona 500 as he was moving forward when the race was called for rain. He ended up seventh.

Waltrip decided to skip the road courses (Infineon Raceway and Watkins Glen International) handing it over to Patrick Carpentier to get the No. 55 back in the top-35 owners points.

On July 7, 2009, Waltrip announced he would be driving part-time in the 2010 season starting with the Daytona 500. Waltrip also announced Martin Truex Jr. would take over Waltrip's car as the No. 56 NAPA Auto Parts Toyota full-time in 2010, using the No. 55 owners points.

==== 2010 ====
In 2010, Waltrip announced that he would only be racing at the Daytona 500 unless more sponsorship was found; Waltrip drove the No. 51 for the 2010 Daytona 500. Waltrip entered two full-time cars for 2010 No. 00 David Reutimann and No. 56 Martin Truex Jr., with Reutimann and Truex Jr. running the full schedule, Waltrip ran 6 races Daytona 500 (No. 51 MWR), Food City 500 (No. 55 Prism), Aaron's 499 (No. 55 Prism), Heluva Good! Sour Cream Dips 400 (No. 55 Prism), Toyota/Save Mart 350 (No. 55 Prism), and AMP Energy Juice 500 (No. 55 MWR). Waltrip qualified 21st on Daytona Pole qualifying day. This was not fast enough to get in the race on speed, however. He then wrecked out of the first qualifying race. Waltrip was able to gain a spot in the starting grid when driver Scott Speed raced to make the 500 using his qualifying time in the second qualifying race, giving Waltrip the 43rd place starting position. He finished in a respectable eighteenth place. Since then, Michael has started the No. 55 Prism Motorsports entry at Bristol, finishing 41st. Waltrip qualified for the Aaron's 499 at Talladega Superspeedway and raced his way to the lead early, but wound up finishing 39th after "The Big One" on lap 84 of the race. It was announced in May that Waltrip would pilot the Toyota Sponsafier winning paint scheme on June 20 at Infineon Raceway in Sonoma, CA, but he failed to qualify. Waltrip also ran the Amp Energy 500 in a Michael Waltrip Racing fielded No. 55 Toyota where he would lead three laps and finish 28th.

Waltrip and his business partner Rob Kaufmann have entered various GT endurance races, participating in the Dubai 24 Hours and also the 24 Hours of Spa, driving a Ferrari F430 GTE for the Italian team AF Corse in both races. Waltrip, Kaufmann, and the AF Corse team finished fifth overall and 3rd in class at Spa, clinching a podium spot.

==== 2011 ====
In 2011, Waltrip announced that he would attempt to make his 25th consecutive Daytona 500 start driving the No. 15. Waltrip retained his drivers for 2011 No. 00 David Reutimann in the No. 00 and No. 56 Martin Truex Jr. in the No. 56, both of whom would run the full schedule. As well as the Daytona 500, Waltrip ran three races that year: the Aaron's 499, the Quaker State 400, and the Good Sam Club 500. Aside from the Sprint Cup event at Daytona, Waltrip also competed in the Camping World Truck Series and Nationwide Series races there. He captured an emotional win in the NextEra Energy Resources 250, which came 10 years to the day of the death of Dale Earnhardt and his first Sprint Cup Series victory. The victory also made Waltrip the 22nd driver to win a race in all three NASCAR national touring series. He followed up his Friday night win with a solid ninth-place finish in the Nationwide Series race the next day. On Sunday afternoon, as part of the commemoration of the tenth anniversary of Dale Earnhardt's death in the 2001 Daytona 500, (which Waltrip won) Waltrip drove a replica of the No. 15 NAPA Auto Parts-sponsored car that he drove at the time. However, Waltrip finished 40th in the race after getting caught up in an early wreck that eliminated fourteen cars. For the rest of 2011, Waltrip said he was working on plans to attempt the Sprint Cup Inaugural event at Kentucky Speedway in July, along with his first Le Mans start with AF Corse. He ran in the 2011 24 Hours of Le Mans in June in one of the AF Corse entered Ferraris. The car he co-drove with Robert Kauffman and Rui Águas completed 178 laps before retiring, finishing 38th overall. On September 29, 2011, it was announced that Waltrip would be replacing Jeff Hammond in the FOX's Hollywood Hotel on NASCAR on Fox beginning with the Daytona 500 in 2012 with Chris Myers and his brother Darrell Waltrip.

At the end of 2011, Waltrip hired Clint Bowyer to drive the No. 15 in 2012. On November 4, 2011, MWR announced that David Reutimann would not return as driver of the No. 00 for 2012 so Waltrip changed the number to No. 55 in honor of Aaron's 1955 founding and he hired Mark Martin and Brian Vickers to co-drive with Waltrip in 2012 and 2013.

==== 2012 ====
In January, Waltrip was confirmed as a driver for AF Corse Ferrari in the inaugural season of the FIA World Endurance Championship. Four weeks before the Daytona 500, Waltrip and Rob Kaufmann entered the 2012 Rolex 24 at Daytona. After a series of mechanical problems and off course excursions, Waltrip, Rob Kaufmann, Rui Águas, and Travis Pastrana never gave up and pressed on to finish 22nd in GT and 35th overall.

In early February, it was announced that Waltrip would attempt to qualify for the 2012 Daytona 500 for Hillman Racing, driving the No. 40 Toyota with sponsorship from Aaron's. He failed to qualify for the race, crashing in a single-car incident in the first Gatorade Duel race.

On May 6, Waltrip qualified for the 2012 Aarons 499 at Talladega Superspeedway and led several laps before finishing nineteenth.

Waltrip also qualified for the fall Talladega race. On the last lap, he was running fifth when he jumped to the bottom lane and made a move for the lead to try to win heading into turn 4 with drafting help from Casey Mears. In turn 4, Tony Stewart tried to block Waltrip but underestimated Waltrip's speed. Waltrip tapped Stewart, and went up into the tightly bunched pack, collecting 23 cars, while Stewart flipped over once and slid on his side airborne and pushed by the wrecking field. Waltrip finished 25th.

==== 2013 ====
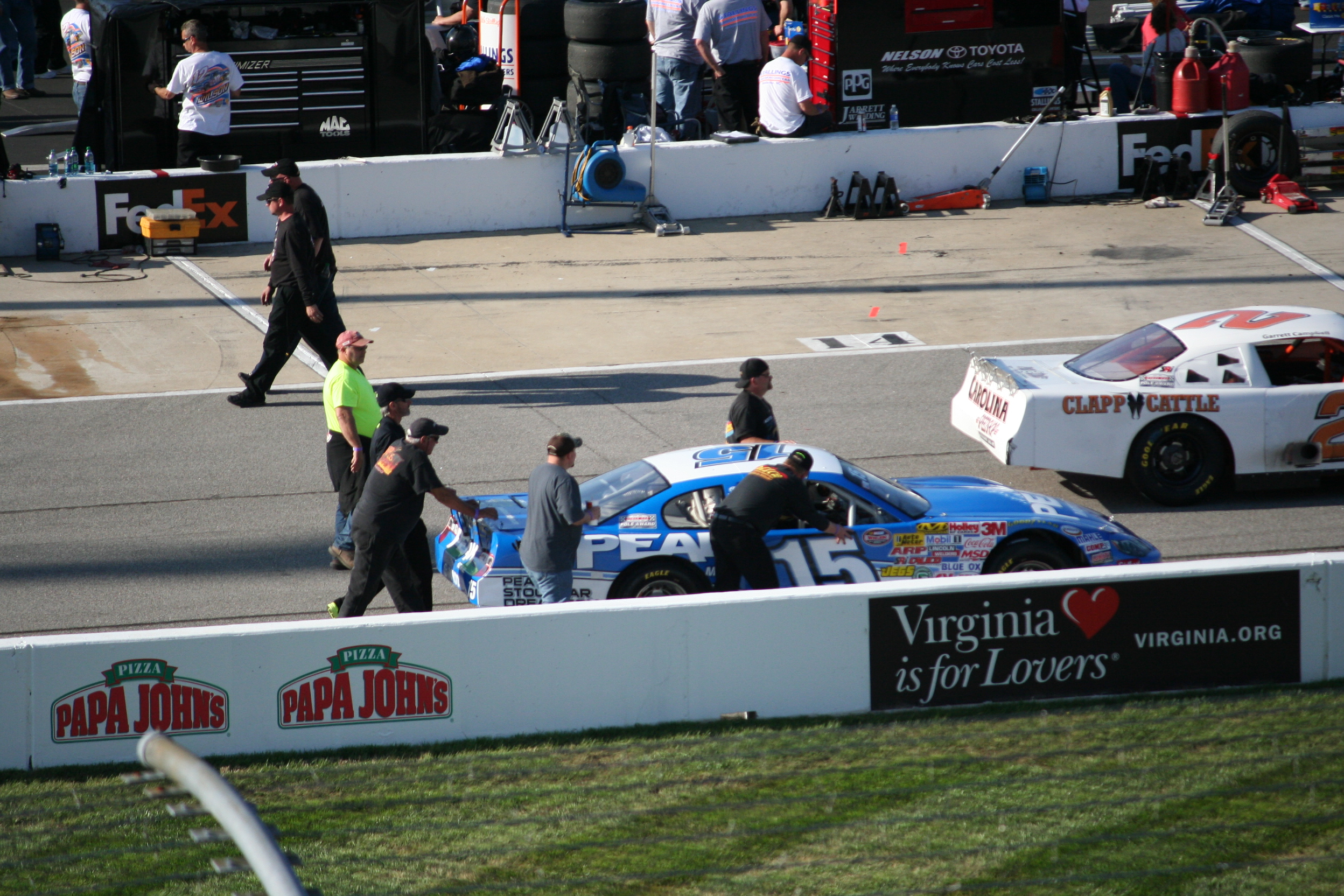
Waltrip competed in the 2013 Denny Hamlin Short Track Showdown

Waltrip entered the 2013 Daytona 500 driving the No. 30 Toyota for Swan Racing, which was changed for Daytona to the No. 26 as a charity car to raise funds for victims of the Newtown, Connecticut shooting. At his Budweiser Duel, Waltrip ran close to the front but faded back in the final laps. He ultimately finished fifteenth, but it was enough to grab the final transfer spot for the Daytona 500. At the Great American Race, Waltrip led four laps and finished 22nd in the race. He also finished in the top-five at all other races (three others) too.

In his first race in the No. 55 for the season at Talladega, Waltrip finished fourth. He also ran at Daytona in July and finished fifth.

On September 12, 2013, NASCAR penalized Michael Waltrip Racing for intentionally manipulating the outcome of the Federated Auto Parts 400. As a result, NAPA Auto Parts pulled its sponsorship of the team at the end of the year, forcing Waltrip to release Martin Truex Jr. from his contract.

==== 2014 ====
After originally announcing that he would field a part-time car for semi-retired Jeff Burton, plans changed when Waltrip sold the No. 56 team to investors of Identity Ventures who started a satellite team for MWR. Waltrip ran four races for Identity Ventures Racing owned by Jay Robinson, Mark Bailey, and James Hamilton.

Waltrip ran the Daytona 500, Aaron's 499, Coke Zero 400 and GEICO 500. At Daytona in Speedweeks, Waltrip was collected in a last-lap pileup caused when Jimmie Johnson ran out of gas on the final lap. Waltrip nonetheless made it into the race. He crashed on lap 144 and finished 41st. He finished 25th at the Aaron's 499 at Talladega.

For both races, he eschewed working with regular Identity Ventures Racing crew chief Scott Eggleston, with whom he had won his first Daytona 500, and instead paired himself with Chad Walter. At the summer Daytona race, Waltrip finally decided to work with Eggleston and ended up getting his first top-twenty in over a year. However at Talladega in October, Waltrip again worked with Walter and did pick up another top-twenty. Identity Ventures Racing closed up shop after the season was over.

==== 2015 ====
Waltrip returned to driving for his team, piloting the No. 55 at both Daytona and Talladega in the spring. Waltrip skipped the summer Daytona race, but returned at Talladega in the fall, running a third MWR entry after leasing the owner points from the No. 98 of Premium Motorsports.

==== 2016 ====
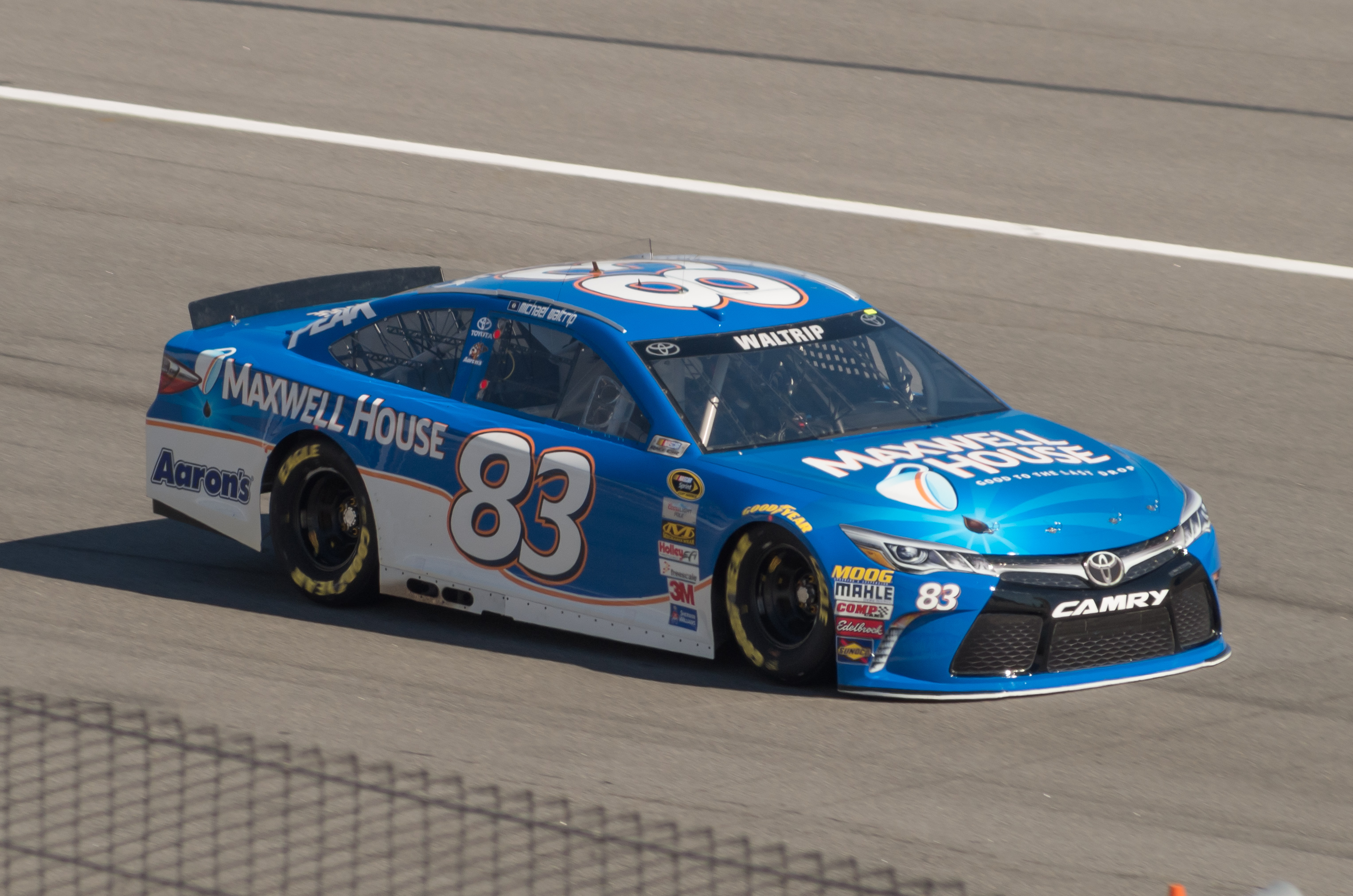
Waltrip's 2016 Cup car for BK Racing

On February 4, Waltrip announced he would return to the Daytona 500, driving the No. 83 Camry for BK Racing. Waltrip drove the No. 55 Camry for Premium Motorsports at Talladega in April with Peak BlueDEF as sponsor. Waltrip skipped again the summer Daytona race.

==== 2017 ====
Waltrip announced he would run the Daytona 500, driving the No. 15 Aaron's Camry for Premium Motorsports. It would be his final start in NASCAR-sanctioned racing. Waltrip started 32nd out of the forty car field, avoiding several large wrecks to end his NASCAR career with an eighth-place finish.

== Personal life ==
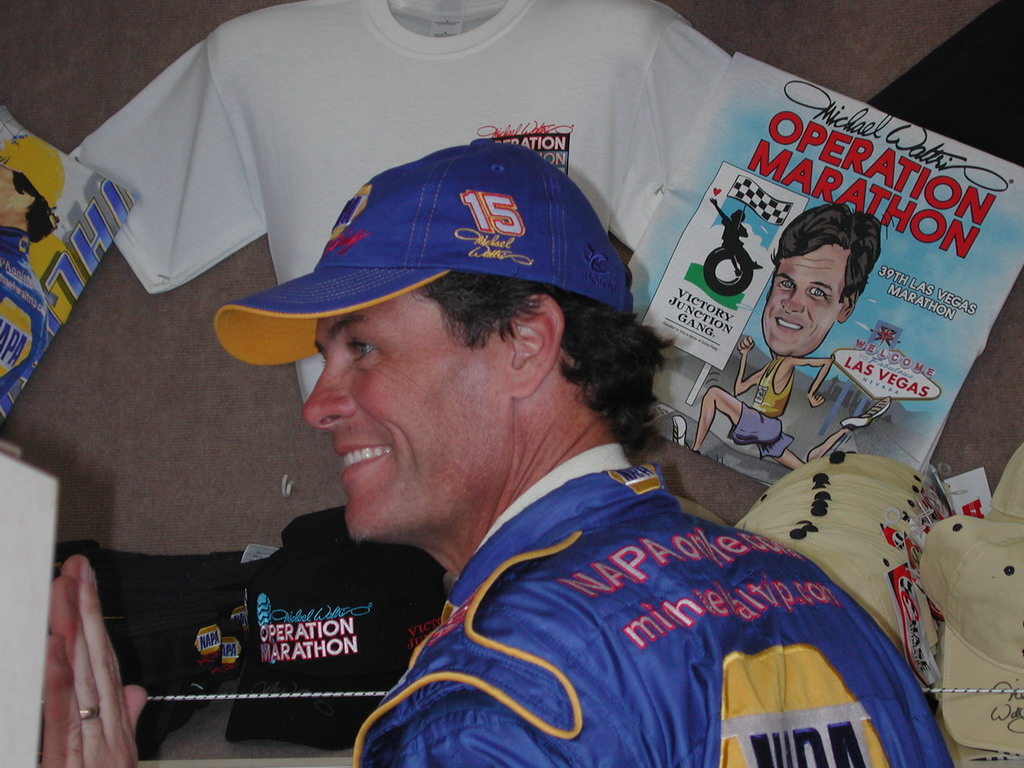
Waltrip in 2004

Waltrip was born in Owensboro, Kentucky. He currently lives in Huntersville, North Carolina. Waltrip was married to Elizabeth "Buffy" Franks. They were divorced in 2010.

Waltrip is an avid runner. In 2001, he participated in the Boston Marathon.

In October 2017, Waltrip had plans to attend the Route 91 Harvest music festival, but he canceled those plans. Later that night a gunman fired shots at the festival from the 32nd floor of the Mandalay Bay hotel and casino, causing the deadliest mass shooting in U.S. history. The following morning, Waltrip revealed on his Instagram account that he had befriended a family while in Las Vegas earlier in the day, that was also scheduled to attend the festival. On October 4, he tweeted that he had contacted the father of the family, adding that they "are doing as well as could be expected."

Waltrip is an investor in the Nashville Kats of Arena Football One, as well as in Michael Waltrip Brewing Company.

== In popular media ==
=== Acting ===
Waltrip appeared on the two-part April 30, 2009/May 7, 2009 episode of My Name Is Earl entitled "Inside Probe."

=== Television appearances ===
Waltrip works as a color commentator for NASCAR on Fox, covering the Xfinity Series since 2015 and the Truck Series since 2004.

On September 4, 2014, Waltrip was announced as one of the celebrities who would participate on the 19th season of Dancing with the Stars. He was paired with professional dancer Emma Slater. They were eliminated on November 3, 2014.

On the December 2, 2019 episode of WWE Raw, Waltrip put on a referees uniform and helped Kyle Busch defeat R-Truth for WWE 24/7 Championship

=== Book ===
Waltrip wrote a book published in 2011 called In the Blink of an Eye: Dale, Daytona, and the Day that Changed Everything. It became a New York Times best-seller. A documentary film adaptation, Blink of an Eye, was released in 2019.

== Controversies ==
=== Feuds with rival drivers ===
After a race in 1992, Waltrip hit driver Dave Marcis while he was still in his car, punching him in the mouth and cutting his lip open, and was fined $500 (equivalent to US$1,147 in 2025) for his actions.

In 1995 at Michigan International Speedway, Waltrip also hit driver, Lake Speed. Waltrip hit Speed twice on national television, while Speed was strapped in his car. Waltrip was fined $10,000 (equivalent to US$21,129 in 2025) for his actions.

Waltrip had a much-publicized feud with fellow Kentucky-man Jeff Green, then the driver of Petty Enterprises No. 43 Cheerios/Betty Crocker Dodge Charger in the early part of the 2005 season, which came to a head during races at Martinsville and Darlington, where Green and Waltrip wrecked each other on several occasions. The feud went back to 2002, when racing for the win at Rockingham caused both to lose control of their cars, allowing Jamie McMurray to win his second straight Busch Series race, although Waltrip and Green admitted to having been off-track friends and former high school schoolmates. After Waltrip retaliated against Green late in the Darlington race, NASCAR penalized Waltrip with a one-lap penalty. Following the race, NASCAR brought Green and Waltrip together and warned them to avoid future incidents.

In the 2005 Sylvania 300, Waltrip wrecked Robby Gordon's No. 7 Jim Beam Chevrolet after the yellow flag had come out. The angered Gordon got out of his totaled car and threw his helmet at the No. 15 car as it was passing by. When TNT interviewed him about the crash he stated "You know Michael, everyone thinks Michael's this good guy. He's not the good guy he acts he is. The caution was out and he wrecked me and he's a piece of shit." TNT apologized for the incident on both drivers' behalf, and both Gordon and Waltrip were required to meet with NASCAR officials after the race. Gordon was fined $50,000 and docked 50 drivers' points. Waltrip was also penalized, but the penalties were overturned on appeal. Gordon and Waltrip ultimately decided to auction the helmet for the benefit of the Harrah's Employee Relief Fund, a fund that provides aid to Harrah's employees displaced by Hurricane Katrina.

In 2008, Waltrip made contact with Casey Mears with 46 laps to go resulting in Mears successfully passing him. As a reply, Waltrip rushed up to Mears, locked his hood on Mears' damaged car, and tried to push it around through a struggle lasting over 4 seconds. Eventually Mears crashed, and soon after, NASCAR parked Waltrip as a punishment.

In the 2008 Sharpie 500, an irate Clint Bowyer, who was involved in a wreck involving Waltrip, said "Michael Waltrip is the worst driver in NASCAR, period! Could not believe NAPA (his primary sponsor) signed him back on!" However, Bowyer made it up with him after 2008 and eventually joined Waltrip's race team in 2012.

=== Scandals ===
In 2007, Waltrip had his No. 55 Toyota confiscated by NASCAR officials after inspectors found an odorless, Vaseline-like substance in the car's engine. Later in the week, NASCAR handed down the punishment to Michael Waltrip Racing, which included the ejection of team vice president of competition Bobby Kennedy and Crew Chief David Hyder from the garage at Daytona. Hyder was also fined $100,000 (equivalent to US$155,272 in 2025), the largest fine ever handed down by NASCAR (until Kurt Busch was penalized for a pit road incident). Waltrip himself was penalized with a loss of 100 driver points and his qualifying time from pole day on Feb 11 was thrown out. Elizabeth Waltrip, Michael's wife and the official owner of his car was also docked 100 owners points. The substance found in the vehicle's fuel was referred to as "rocket fuel", later determined to be Sterno.

In the 2013 Federated Auto Parts 400, the final race before the Chase for the Sprint Cup, Waltrip's team was penalized with the biggest penalty in NASCAR's history. In the race, MWR's Clint Bowyer spun out with 7 laps left after radio conversation hinting at an order to do so, and Brian Vickers was ordered to pit because the team "needed one more point". Following an investigation by NASCAR, the team was fined $300,000, stripped 50 driver points and 50 owner's points for each team, indefinitely suspended team vice-president Ty Norris and put every MWR crew chief on probation until December 31. With the points loss, Truex missed the Chase, which put Ryan Newman back in the wildcard spot. Waltrip stated as a reaction to the penalties that "I want to sincerely apologize to NASCAR, our sponsors, fans, and fellow drivers who were disappointed in our actions. We will learn from this and move on."

=== Car accident ===
On April 11, 2007, Waltrip was charged with reckless driving and leaving the scene of the accident after crashing his car into a telephone pole.

== Motorsports career results ==
=== NASCAR ===
(key) (Bold – Pole position awarded by qualifying time. Italics – Pole position earned by points standings or practice time. * – Most laps led.)

==== Monster Energy Cup Series ====
Monster Energy Cup Series results
Year	Team	No.	Make	1	2	3	4	5	6	7	8	9	10	11	12	13	14	15	16	17	18	19	20	21	22	23	24	25	26	27	28	29	30	31	32	33	34	35	36	NCS	Pts	Ref
1985	Bahre Racing	23	Pontiac	DAY	RCH	CAR	ATL	BRI	DAR	NWS	MAR	TAL	DOV	CLT; 28	RSD	POC	MCH	DAY	POC	TAL	MCH; 18	BRI	DAR; 24	RCH	DOV	MAR	NWS	CLT; 31	CAR	ATL; 39	RSD									57th	207	
1986	Bahari Racing	23	Pontiac	DAY; DNQ	RCH; 25	CAR; 21	ATL; 19		DAR; 13	NWS; 26	MAR; 11	TAL; 35	DOV; 12	CLT; 26	RSD; 25	POC; 39	MCH; 22	DAY; 18	POC; 11	TAL; 14	GLN; 17	MCH; 32	BRI; 13	DAR; 16	RCH; 14	DOV; 16	MAR; 14	NWS; 23	CLT; 19	CAR; 13	ATL; 20	RSD; 31								19th	2853	
1986	Bahari Racing	23	Buick					BRI; 32																																19th	2853	
1987	Bahari Racing	30	Chevy	DAY; 22	CAR; 17	RCH; 12	ATL; 39	DAR; 19	NWS; 24		MAR; 10	TAL; 25	CLT; 11	DOV; 21	POC; 16	RSD; 32	MCH; 39	DAY; 19	POC; 37	TAL; 17	GLN; 16	MCH; 20	BRI; 14	DAR; 19	RCH; 19	DOV; 18	MAR; 18	NWS; 16	CLT; 35	CAR; 19	RSD; 26	ATL; 38								20th	2840	
1987	Bahari Racing	30	Pontiac							BRI; 13																														20th	2840	
1988	Bahari Racing	30	Pontiac	DAY; DNQ	RCH; 31		ATL; 12	DAR; 21	BRI; 12	NWS; 32	MAR; 22	TAL; 33	CLT; 23	DOV; 36	RSD; 11	POC; 2	MCH; 28	DAY; 21	POC; 17	TAL; 20	GLN; 33	MCH; 7	BRI; 31	DAR; 25	RCH; 12	DOV; 12	MAR; 25	CLT; 23	NWS; 25	CAR; 19	PHO; 28	ATL; 7								18th	2949	
1988	Mueller Brothers Racing	89	Pontiac	DAY; 22																																				18th	2949	
1988	Bahari Racing	30	Chevy			CAR; 13																																		18th	2949	
1989	Bahari Racing	30	Pontiac	DAY; 21	CAR; 12	ATL; 20	RCH; 13	DAR; 9	BRI; 11	NWS; 29	MAR; 25	TAL; 21	CLT; 27	DOV; 22	SON; 10	POC; 14	MCH; 16	DAY; 34	POC; 28	TAL; 36	GLN; 10	MCH; 31	BRI; 32	DAR; 13	RCH; 23	DOV; 6	MAR; 12	CLT; 17	NWS; 23	CAR; 17	PHO; 9	ATL; 26								18th	3057	
1990	Bahari Racing	30	Pontiac	DAY; 8	RCH; 27	CAR; 28	ATL; 38	DAR; 9	BRI; 20	NWS; 27	MAR; 8	TAL; 5	CLT; 4	DOV; 26	SON; 9	POC; 19	MCH; 21	DAY; 16	POC; 23	TAL; 21	GLN; 4	MCH; 30	BRI; 9	DAR; 26	RCH; 14	DOV; 5	MAR; 30	NWS; 15	CLT; 3	CAR; 15	PHO; 43	ATL; 14								16th	3251	
1991	Bahari Racing	30	Pontiac	DAY; 38	RCH; 17	CAR; 7	ATL; 5	DAR; 3*	BRI; 23	NWS; 7	MAR; 7	TAL; 5	CLT; 15	**DOV**; 32	SON; 10	POC; 18	**MCH**; 34	DAY; 6	POC; 38	TAL; 7	GLN; 21	MCH; 9	BRI; 25	DAR; 27	RCH; 30	DOV; 5	MAR; 25	NWS; 27	CLT; 7	CAR; 19	PHO; 24	ATL; 40								15th	3254	
1992	Bahari Racing	30	Pontiac	DAY; 18	CAR; 4	RCH; 34	ATL; 28	DAR; 14	BRI; 17	NWS; 29	MAR; 27	TAL; 38	CLT; 25	DOV; 15	SON; 20	POC; 15	MCH; 27	DAY; 27	POC; 26	TAL; 7	GLN; 35	MCH; 22	BRI; 14	DAR; 35	RCH; 33	DOV; 17	MAR; 29	NWS; 16	CLT; 23	CAR; 20	PHO; 11	ATL; 14								23rd	2825	
1993	Bahari Racing	30	Pontiac	DAY; 16	CAR; 26	RCH; 23	ATL; 14	DAR; 33	BRI; 14	NWS; 20	MAR; 16	TAL; 10	SON; 23	CLT; 13	DOV; 27	POC; 21	MCH; 37	DAY; 22	NHA; 23	POC; 14	TAL; 20	GLN; 12	MCH; 16	BRI; 10	DAR; 13	RCH; 19	DOV; 23	MAR; 8	NWS; 14	CLT; 27	CAR; 18	PHO; 9	ATL; 6							17th	3291	
1994	Bahari Racing	30	Pontiac	DAY; 31	CAR; 10	RCH; 31	ATL; 23	DAR; 15	BRI; 5	NWS; 11	MAR; 17	TAL; 3	SON; 16	CLT; 10	DOV; 7	POC; 11	MCH; 8	DAY; 13	NHA; 37	POC; 14	TAL; 11	IND; 8	GLN; 20	MCH; 14	BRI; 7	DAR; 31	RCH; 26	DOV; 33	MAR; 19	NWS; 21	CLT; 10	CAR; 26	PHO; 36	ATL; 10						12th	3512	
1995	Bahari Racing	30	Pontiac	DAY; 6	CAR; 17	RCH; 23	ATL; 35	DAR; 7	BRI; 22	NWS; 22	MAR; 15	TAL; 12	SON; 10	CLT; 3	DOV; 8	POC; 9	MCH; 12	DAY; 15	NHA; 14	POC; 21	TAL; 9	IND; 14	GLN; 14	MCH; 11	BRI; 15	DAR; 5	RCH; 28	DOV; 29	MAR; 25	NWS; 12	CLT; 17	CAR; 38	PHO; 34	ATL; 12						12th	3601	
1996	Wood Brothers Racing	21	Ford	DAY; 10	CAR; 35	RCH; 36	ATL; 9	DAR; 29	BRI; 10	NWS; 17	MAR; 17	TAL; 5	SON; 22	CLT; 8	DOV; 11	POC; 14	MCH; 32	DAY; 7	NHA; 10	POC; 13	TAL; 42	IND; 28	GLN; 7	MCH; 25	BRI; 6	DAR; 33	RCH; 14	DOV; 9	MAR; 14	NWS; 12	CLT; 9	CAR; 14	PHO; 16	ATL; 11						14th	3535	
1997	Wood Brothers Racing	21	Ford	DAY; 32	CAR; 26	RCH; 27	ATL; 7	DAR; 7	TEX; 9	BRI; 21	MAR; 26	SON; 7	TAL; 14	CLT; 17	DOV; 7	POC; 13	MCH; 16	CAL; 11	DAY; 35	NHA; 29	POC; 22	IND; 39	GLN; 25	MCH; 22	BRI; 25	DAR; 9	RCH; 35	NHA; 32	DOV; 42	MAR; 36	CLT; 24	TAL; 28	CAR; 14	PHO; 26	ATL; 13					18th	3173	
1998	Wood Brothers Racing	21	Ford	DAY; 9	CAR; 34	LVS; 14	ATL; 18	DAR; 16	BRI; 9	TEX; 9	MAR; 21	TAL; 21	CAL; 20	CLT; 18	DOV; 14	RCH; 40	MCH; 21	POC; 14	SON; 34	NHA; 24	POC; 10	IND; 21	GLN; 28	MCH; 22	BRI; 16	NHA; 27	DAR; 17	RCH; 26	DOV; 20	MAR; 20	CLT; 13	TAL; 9	DAY; 31	PHO; DNQ	CAR; 22	ATL; 22				17th	3340	
1999	Mattei Motorsports	7	Chevy	DAY; 5	CAR; 20	LVS; 22	ATL; 10	DAR; 21	TEX; 14	BRI; 12	MAR; 39	TAL; 18	CAL; 23	RCH; 22	CLT; 37	DOV; 42	MCH; 15	POC; 37	SON; 10	DAY; 39	NHA; 19	POC; 12	IND; 27	GLN; 21	MCH; 13	BRI; 37	DAR; 41	RCH; 38	NHA; 38	DOV; 19	MAR; 33	CLT; 14	TAL; 39	CAR; 27	PHO; 33	HOM; 36	ATL; 36			29th	2974	
2000	Mattei Motorsports	7	Chevy	DAY; 39	CAR; 23	LVS; 33	ATL; 25	DAR; 32	BRI; 11	TEX; 29	MAR; 3	TAL; 31	CAL; 30	RCH; 19	CLT; 18	DOV; 39																								27th	2797	
2000	Ultra Motorsports	7	Chevy														MCH; 22	POC; 43	SON; 12	DAY; 42	NHA; 35	POC; 17	IND; 20	GLN; 17	MCH; 21	BRI; 19	DAR; 40	RCH; 43	NHA; 20	DOV; 24	MAR; 24	CLT; 22	TAL; 34	CAR; 35	PHO; 32	HOM; 34	ATL; 39			27th	2797	
2001	Dale Earnhardt, Inc.	15	Chevy	DAY; 1	CAR; 19	LVS; 13	ATL; 23	DAR; 25	BRI; 22	TEX; 39	MAR; 24	TAL; 28	CAL; 43	RCH; 35	CLT; 28	DOV; 43	MCH; 29	POC; 30	SON; 20	DAY; 2	CHI; 22	NHA; 28	POC; 19	IND; 25	GLN; 18	MCH; 36	BRI; 39	DAR; 36	RCH; 20	DOV; 39	KAN; 38	CLT; 18	MAR; 19	TAL; 37	PHO; 23	CAR; 21	HOM; 2	ATL; 26	NHA; 40	24th	3159	
2002	Dale Earnhardt, Inc.	15	Chevy	DAY; 5	CAR; 40	LVS; 22	ATL; 40	DAR; 15	BRI; 30	TEX; 28	MAR; 13	TAL; 2	CAL; 10	RCH; 24	CLT; 8	DOV; 21	POC; 8	MCH; 4	SON; 22	DAY; 1*	CHI; 42	NHA; 20	POC; 18	IND; 16	GLN; 9	MCH; 15	BRI; 22	DAR; 24	RCH; 36	NHA; 8	DOV; 12	KAN; 26	TAL; 8	CLT; 11	MAR; 18	ATL; 11	CAR; 19	PHO; 20	HOM; 41	14th	3985	
2003	Dale Earnhardt, Inc.	15	Chevy	DAY; 1*	CAR; 19	LVS; 3	ATL; 27	DAR; 5	BRI; 25	TEX; 17	TAL; 24	MAR; 23	CAL; 7	RCH; 12	CLT; 6	DOV; 16	POC; 18	MCH; 5	SON; 13	DAY; 11	CHI; 5	NHA; 28	POC; 4	IND; 16	GLN; 13	MCH; 7	BRI; 42	DAR; 37	RCH; 32	NHA; 26	DOV; 42	TAL; 1	KAN; 39	CLT; 14	MAR; 26	ATL; 38	PHO; 5	CAR; 37	HOM; 41	15th	3934	
2004	Dale Earnhardt, Inc.	15	Chevy	DAY; 38	CAR; 33	LVS; 37	ATL; 23	DAR; 35	BRI; 10	TEX; 20	MAR; 15	TAL; 12	CAL; 32	RCH; 10	CLT; 2	DOV; 6	POC; 33	MCH; 10	SON; 4	DAY; 13	CHI; 9	NHA; 6	POC; 36	IND; 20	GLN; 20	MCH; 17	BRI; 27	CAL; 23	RCH; 13	NHA; 9	DOV; 16	TAL; 25	KAN; 11	CLT; 28	MAR; 19	ATL; 14	PHO; 17	DAR; 33	HOM; 17	20th	3878	
2005	Dale Earnhardt, Inc.	15	Chevy	DAY; 37	CAL; 38	LVS; 21	ATL; 7	BRI; 19	MAR; 30	TEX; 6	PHO; 2	TAL; 3	DAR; 34	RCH; 9	CLT; 36	DOV; 13	**POC**; 5	MCH; 7	SON; 22	DAY; 40	CHI; 36	NHA; 17	POC; 26	IND; 16	GLN; 41	MCH; 27	BRI; 15	CAL; 13	RCH; 31	NHA; 15	DOV; 26	TAL; 42	KAN; 40	CLT; 29	MAR; 27	ATL; 11	TEX; 41	PHO; 33	HOM; 29	25th	3452	
2006	Bill Davis Racing	55	Dodge	DAY; 18	CAL; 36	LVS; 35	ATL; 20	BRI; 32	MAR; 29	TEX; 26	PHO; 42	TAL; 25	RCH; 31	DAR; 35	CLT; DNQ	DOV; 32	POC; 28	MCH; 25	SON; 23	DAY; 38	CHI; 30	NHA; 36	POC; 40	IND; DNQ	GLN; 36	MCH; 23	BRI; 16	CAL; 31	RCH; DNQ	NHA; 23	DOV; 28	KAN; 35	TAL; 14	CLT; 38	MAR; 34	ATL; 33	TEX; 43	PHO; 42	HOM; DNQ	37th	2350	
2006	McGlynn Racing	55	Dodge												CLT; 41																									37th	2350	
2007	Michael Waltrip Racing	55	Toyota	DAY; 30	CAL; DNQ	LVS; DNQ	ATL; DNQ	BRI; DNQ	MAR; DNQ	TEX; DNQ	PHO; DNQ	TAL; DNQ	RCH; DNQ	DAR; DNQ	CLT; DNQ	DOV; 28	POC; DNQ	MCH; 10	SON	NHA; DNQ	DAY; DNQ	CHI; 30	IND	POC; 38	GLN	MCH; 40	BRI; 23	CAL; 42	RCH; DNQ	NHA; DNQ	DOV; 15	KAN; 30	**TAL**; 25	CLT; 10	MAR; 18	ATL; 11	TEX; DNQ	PHO; DNQ	HOM; DNQ	44th	1149	
2008	Michael Waltrip Racing	55	Toyota	DAY; 29	CAL; 28	LVS; 31	ATL; 30	BRI; 23	MAR; 35	TEX; 31	PHO; 24	TAL; 27	RCH; 37	DAR; 24	CLT; 27	DOV; 28	POC; 37	MCH; 23	SON; 25	NHA; 2	DAY; 27	CHI; 36	IND; 43	POC; 43	GLN; 39	MCH; 19	BRI; 30	CAL; 33	RCH; 28	NHA; 25	DOV; 10	KAN; 35	TAL; 19	CLT; 24	MAR; 18	ATL; 37	TEX; 27	PHO; 24	HOM; 38	29th	2889	
2009	Michael Waltrip Racing	55	Toyota	DAY; 7	CAL; 15	LVS; 27	ATL; 25	BRI; 32	MAR; 13	TEX; 24	PHO; 37	TAL; 21	RCH; 24	DAR; 40	CLT; 30	DOV; 35	POC; 17	MCH; 30	SON	NHA; 24	DAY; 37	CHI; 20	IND; 35	POC; 31	GLN	MCH; 27	BRI; 31	ATL; 32	RCH; 32	NHA; 27	DOV; 36	KAN; 38	CAL; 17	CLT; 32	MAR; 30	TAL; 7	TEX; 23	PHO; 36	HOM; 30	33rd	2839	
2010	Michael Waltrip Racing	51	Toyota	DAY; 18	CAL	LVS	ATL																																	55th	284	
2010	Prism Motorsports	55	Toyota					BRI; 41	MAR	PHO	TEX	TAL; 39	RCH	DAR	DOV	CLT	POC	MCH; DNQ	SON; DNQ	NHA	DAY	CHI	IND	POC	GLN	MCH	BRI	ATL	RCH	NHA	DOV	KAN	CAR	CLT	MAR					55th	284	
2010	Michael Waltrip Racing	55	Toyota																																	TAL; 28	TEX	PHO	HOM	55th	284	
2011	Michael Waltrip Racing	15	Toyota	DAY; 40	PHO	LVS	BRI	CAL	MAR	TEX	TAL; 28	RCH	DAR	DOV	CLT	KAN	POC	MCH	SON	DAY	KEN; DNQ	NHA	IND	POC	GLN	MCH	BRI	ATL	RCH	CHI	NHA	DOV	KAN	CLT	TAL; 9	MAR	TEX	PHO	HOM	42nd	56	
2012	Hillman Racing	40	Toyota	DAY; DNQ	PHO	LVS	BRI	CAL	MAR	TEX	KAN	RCH																												43rd	94	
2012	Michael Waltrip Racing	55	Toyota										TAL; 19	DAR	CLT	DOV	POC	MCH	SON	KEN; 30	DAY; 9	NHA	IND	POC	GLN	MCH	BRI	ATL	RCH	CHI	NHA	DOV	TAL; 25	CLT	KAN	MAR	TEX	PHO	HOM	43rd	94	
2013	Swan Racing	26	Toyota	DAY; 22	PHO	LVS	BRI	CAL	MAR	TEX	KAN	RCH																												40th	114	
2013	Michael Waltrip Racing	55	Toyota										TAL; 4	DAR	CLT	DOV	POC	MCH	SON	KEN	DAY; 5	NHA	IND	POC	GLN	MCH	BRI	ATL	RCH	CHI	NHA	DOV	KAN	CLT	TAL; 32	MAR	TEX	PHO	HOM	40th	114	
2014	Michael Waltrip Racing	66	Toyota	DAY; 41	PHO	LVS	BRI	CAL	MAR	TEX	DAR	RCH	TAL; 25	KAN	CLT	DOV	POC	MCH	SON	KEN															TAL; 16	MAR	TEX	PHO	HOM	42nd	76	
2014	Identity Ventures Racing	66	Toyota																		DAY; 19	NHA	IND	POC	GLN	MCH	BRI	ATL	RCH	CHI	NHA	DOV	KAN	CLT						42nd	76	
2015	Michael Waltrip Racing	55	Toyota	DAY; 26	ATL	LVS	PHO	CAL	MAR	TEX	BRI	RCH	TAL; 36	KAN	CLT	DOV	POC	MCH	SON	DAY	KEN	NHA	IND	POC	GLN	MCH	BRI	DAR	RCH	CHI	NHA	DOV	CLT	KAN						43rd	58	
2015	Michael Waltrip Racing	98	Toyota																																TAL; 13	MAR	TEX	PHO	HOM	43rd	58	
2016	BK Racing	83	Toyota	DAY; 30	ATL	LVS	PHO	CAL	MAR	TEX	BRI	RCH																												45th	42	
2016	Premium Motorsports	55	Toyota										TAL; 12	KAN	DOV	CLT	POC	MCH	SON	DAY	KEN	NHA	IND	POC	GLN	BRI	MCH	DAR	RCH	CHI	NHA	DOV	CLT	KAN	TAL	MAR	TEX	PHO	HOM	45th	42	
2017	Premium Motorsports	15	Toyota	DAY; 8	ATL	LVS	PHO	CAL	MAR	TEX	BRI	RCH	TAL	KAN	CLT	DOV	POC	MCH	SON	DAY	KEN	NHA	IND	POC	GLN	MCH	BRI	DAR	RCH	CHI	NHA	DOV	CLT	TAL	KAN	MAR	TEX	PHO	HOM	38th	29	

===== Daytona 500 =====
Year	Team	Manufacturer	Start	Finish
1986	Bahari Racing	Pontiac	DNQ	
1987	Bahari Racing	Chevrolet	18	22
1988	Bahari Racing	Pontiac	DNQ	
1988	Mueller Brothers Racing	Pontiac	24	22
1989	Bahari Racing	Pontiac	23	21
1990	Bahari Racing	Pontiac	24	8
1991	Bahari Racing	Pontiac	13	38
1992	Bahari Racing	Pontiac	10	18
1993	Bahari Racing	Pontiac	28	16
1994	Bahari Racing	Pontiac	14	31
1995	Bahari Racing	Pontiac	15	6
1996	Wood Brothers Racing	Ford	11	10
1997	Wood Brothers Racing	Ford	12	32
1998	Wood Brothers Racing	Ford	6	9
1999	Mattei Motorsports	Chevrolet	13	5
2000	Mattei Motorsports	Chevrolet	10	39
2001	Dale Earnhardt, Inc.	Chevrolet	19	**1**
2002	Dale Earnhardt, Inc.	Chevrolet	4	5
2003	Dale Earnhardt, Inc.	Chevrolet	4	**1**
2004	Dale Earnhardt, Inc.	Chevrolet	9	38
2005	Dale Earnhardt, Inc.	Chevrolet	3	37
2006	Bill Davis Racing	Dodge	30	18
2007	Michael Waltrip Racing	Toyota	15	30
2008	Michael Waltrip Racing	Toyota	2	29
2009	Michael Waltrip Racing	Toyota	27	7
2010	Michael Waltrip Racing	Toyota	43	18
2011	Michael Waltrip Racing	Toyota	8	40
2012	Hillman Racing	Toyota	DNQ	
2013	Swan Racing	Toyota	29	22
2014	Michael Waltrip Racing	Toyota	42	41
2015	Michael Waltrip Racing	Toyota	34	26
2016	BK Racing	Toyota	36	30
2017	Premium Motorsports	Toyota	30	8

==== Nationwide Series ====
NASCAR Nationwide Series results
Year	Team	No.	Make	1	2	3	4	5	6	7	8	9	10	11	12	13	14	15	16	17	18	19	20	21	22	23	24	25	26	27	28	29	30	31	32	33	34	35	NNSC	Pts	Ref
1988	Bahari Racing	03	Olds	DAY	HCY	CAR	MAR	DAR	BRI	LNG	NZH	SBO	NSV	CLT	DOV	ROU	LAN	LVL	MYB	OXF	SBO	HCY	LNG	IRP; 14	ROU														62nd	221	
1988	Silver Racing	14	Olds																							BRI; 23					CLT; 12	CAR	MAR						62nd	221	
1988	Darrell Waltrip Motorsports	17	Chevy																								DAR; 3	RCH	DOV; 1	MAR									62nd	221	
1989	Bahari Racing	30	Olds	DAY; 8	CAR	MAR	HCY	DAR; 14	BRI; 8	NZH; 3	SBO	LAN	NSV	CLT; 3	DOV; 30	ROU	LVL; 2	VOL	MYB	SBO	HCY	DUB	**IRP**; 1	ROU	BRI; 25	DAR; 23	RCH; 15	**DOV**; 25	MAR	**CLT**; 2									23rd	1716	
1989	Dale Earnhardt, Inc.	3	Chevy																												CAR; 7	MAR							23rd	1716	
1990	Bahari Racing	30	Pontiac	DAY; 36	**RCH**; 1	CAR; 11	MAR	HCY; 19	DAR	BRI; 26	LAN	SBO	NZH	HCY	CLT; 18	DOV; 1*	ROU	VOL	MYB	OXF	NHA; 16	SBO	DUB	IRP; 28	ROU	BRI; 29		**RCH**; 3	DOV	MAR	CLT; 21	NHA	CAR	MAR					30th	1185	
1990	Mac Martin Racing	92	Pontiac																								DAR; 3												30th	1185	
1991	Bahari Racing	30	Pontiac	DAY; 2	RCH; 5	CAR	MAR	VOL	HCY	DAR; 28*	BRI; 25	LAN	SBO	NZH	CLT; 32	DOV	ROU	HCY	MYB	GLN	OXF	NHA; 4	SBO	DUB	IRP	ROU	BRI; 17	DAR; 2	RCH; 4	DOV	CLT; 26	NHA	CAR	MAR					34th	1246	
1992	Bahari Racing	30	Pontiac	**DAY**; 25	CAR	RCH; 17	ATL; 28	MAR	DAR	BRI	HCY	LAN	DUB	NZH; 6	CLT; 23	DOV	ROU	MYB	GLN	VOL	NHA	TAL; 2*	IRP; 26	ROU	MCH; 8	NHA	BRI	DAR; 1	RCH	DOV; 8	CLT; 2	MAR	CAR	HCY					26th	1412	
1993	Bahari Racing	30	Pontiac	DAY; 33	CAR	RCH	DAR; 15	BRI; 1*	HCY	ROU	MAR	NZH	CLT; 1	DOV	MYB	GLN	MLW	TAL; 6	IRP; 29	MCH	NHA	BRI	DAR; 34	RCH; 29	DOV	ROU	CLT; 2	MAR	CAR	HCY	ATL; 3								30th	1240	
1994	Bahari Racing	30	Pontiac	**DAY**; 25*	CAR	RCH	ATL; 34	MAR	DAR; 7	HCY	BRI	ROU	NHA	NZH	CLT; 3	DOV	MYB	GLN	MLW	SBO	TAL; 41	HCY	IRP	MCH	BRI	DAR	RCH; 7		CLT; 12	MAR									41st	983	
1994	Dale Earnhardt, Inc.	3	Chevy																									DOV; 41			CAR; 2								41st	983	
1995	Bahari Racing	30	Pontiac	**DAY**; 2	CAR	RCH	ATL; 36	NSV; 38	DAR	BRI	HCY	NHA	NZH	CLT; 35	DOV	MYB	GLN	MLW	TAL; 20*	SBO	IRP	MCH	BRI	DAR	RCH	DOV	CLT; DNQ	CAR	HOM; 4										48th	595	
1996	Michael Waltrip Racing	12	Ford	DAY; 41	CAR; 11	RCH; 25	ATL; DNQ	NSV; 29	DAR; 2	BRI; 19	HCY	NZH	CLT; 11	DOV	SBO	MYB	GLN; 14	MLW	NHA	TAL; 5	IRP	MCH; 38	BRI; 5	DAR	**RCH**; 38	DOV	CLT; 30	CAR	HOM										34th	1342	
1997	Michael Waltrip Racing	21	Ford	DAY; 3	CAR	RCH	ATL; 15	LVS; 4	DAR	HCY	TEX; 26	BRI; 4	NSV	TAL; 14	NHA	NZH	CLT; DNQ	DOV; 10	SBO	GLN	MLW	MYB	GTY; DNQ	IRP	MCH; 23	BRI; 40	DAR; 33	**RCH**; 28	DOV; 36	CLT; 30	CAL; 4	CAR; 14	HOM; 19						29th	1738	
1998	Michael Waltrip Racing	21	Ford	DAY; 7	CAR	LVS; 20	NSV	DAR; 41	BRI; 29	TEX; 17	HCY	TAL; 40	NHA; 34	NZH	CLT; 4	DOV	RCH; 20	PPR; 31	GLN	MLW	MYB	CAL; 23	SBO	IRP	MCH; 9	BRI; DNQ	DAR; 15	RCH; 14	DOV	CLT; 41	GTY	CAR	ATL; 9	HOM					34th	1667	
1999	Michael Waltrip Racing	21	Chevy	DAY; 40	CAR	LVS; 39	ATL; 11	DAR; 9	TEX; 11	NSV	BRI; 11	TAL	CAL; 8	NHA	RCH; 8	NZH	CLT; 5	DOV; 20	SBO	GLN	MLW	MYB	PPR	GTY	IRP	MCH; 6	BRI; 2	DAR	RCH; DNQ	DOV; 35	CLT; 1	CAR	MEM	PHO; 41	HOM				29th	1762	
2000	Michael Waltrip Racing	7	Chevy	DAY; 27	CAR; QL^{†}	LVS; 15	ATL	DAR	BRI; 32	TEX; DNQ	NSV	TAL	CAL; 4	RCH	NHA	CLT; DNQ	DOV; 7	SBO	MYB	GLN	MLW	NZH	PPR	GTY	IRP	MCH; 2			RCH; 16		CLT; 14			PHO; 37	HOM				37th	1356	
2000	Michael Waltrip Racing	99	Chevy																								BRI; 8	DAR; 15		DOV; 36		CAR; DNQ	MEM						37th	1356	
2001	Michael Waltrip Racing	99	Chevy	DAY; 37	CAR	LVS; 39	ATL; 3	DAR	BRI; 10	TEX	NSH	TAL	CAL	RCH	NHA	NZH	CLT; 43	DOV	KEN	MLW	GLN	CHI; 12	GTY	PPR	IRP	MCH	BRI; 40	DAR	RCH; 18	DOV	KAN; 15	CLT; 18	MEM	PHO; 20	CAR	HOM; 6			41st	1195	
2002	Michael Waltrip Racing	99	Chevy	DAY; 2	CAR; 26	LVS; 2	DAR; 14	BRI; 30	TEX; 42	NSH	TAL; 35	CAL; 8	RCH; 4	NHA	NZH	CLT; 11	DOV	NSH	KEN	MLW	DAY; 42	CHI	GTY	PPR	IRP	MCH; 1*	BRI; 7	DAR	RCH; 8	DOV	**KAN**; 33	**CLT**; 2	MEM	ATL; 2*	CAR; 7	PHO	HOM; 7		27th	2397	
2003	Michael Waltrip Racing	99	Chevy	DAY; 34	CAR; 18	LVS; 7	DAR; 36	BRI; 33	TEX; 11	TAL; 7	NSH	CAL; 2	**RCH**; 4*	GTY	NZH	CLT; 10*	DOV	NSH	KEN	MLW	DAY; 2	CHI; 5	NHA	PPR	IRP	MCH; 8	BRI; 1	DAR; 3	RCH	DOV	**KAN**; 24*	CLT; 2	MEM	ATL; 4	PHO	CAR; 41	HOM; 10		18th	2637	
2004	Michael Waltrip Racing	99	Chevy	DAY; 19	CAR; 4	LVS; 4	DAR; 8	BRI; 7	TEX; 13	NSH; 1	TAL; 8	CAL; 6	GTY; 14	RCH; 28	NZH; 8	CLT; 11	DOV; 16	NSH; 38	KEN; 14	MLW	DAY; 27	CHI; 18	NHA	PPR	IRP; 26	MCH; 24	BRI; 22	CAL; 14	RCH; 30	DOV; 11	KAN; 12	CLT; 23	MEM; 29	ATL; 22	PHO; 19	DAR; 10	HOM; 11		13th	3649	
2005	Michael Waltrip Racing	99	Chevy	DAY; 7	CAL; 38	MXC	LVS; DNQ	ATL; 7	NSH	BRI; 42	TEX; 15	PHO; 7	TAL; 34	DAR	RCH; 34	CLT; 16	DOV	NSH	KEN; 42	MLW	DAY	CHI; 14	NHA	PPR	GTY; 16	IRP	GLN; 40	MCH; 16	BRI; 24	CAL; DNQ	RCH; 9	DOV; 40	KAN; DNQ	CLT; DNQ	MEM	TEX; DNQ	PHO	HOM; DNQ	35th	1587	
2006	Michael Waltrip Racing	99	Dodge	DAY; 15	CAL; 26	MXC; 40	LVS; 24	ATL; 22	BRI; 26	TEX; 25		PHO; 13	TAL; 14	RCH; 25	DAR	CLT; 20	DOV; 31	NSH	KEN	MLW	DAY; 38	CHI; 11	NHA; 23	MAR	GTY	IRP	GLN; 13	MCH; 17	BRI	CAL	RCH	DOV; 10	KAN	CLT; 2	MEM	TEX	PHO; 39	HOM	27th	2126	
2006	Brewco Motorsports	99	Ford								NSH; 10																												27th	2126	
2007	Braun Racing	32	Toyota	DAY	CAL	MXC	LVS	ATL; 43	BRI	NSH	TEX	PHO	TAL	RCH	DAR	CLT	DOV	NSH	KEN	MLW	NHA	DAY	CHI	GTY	IRP	CGV	GLN	MCH	BRI	CAL	RCH	DOV	KAN	CLT	MEM	TEX	PHO	HOM	158th	34	
2009	Michael Waltrip Racing	99	Toyota	DAY; 24	CAL; 15	LVS	BRI	TEX; 19	NSH; 16	PHO; 40	TAL; 40	RCH	DAR	CLT	DOV	NSH	KEN	MLW	NHA	DAY; 11	CHI	GTY	IRP	IOW	GLN	MCH	BRI	CGV	ATL	RCH	DOV	KAN	CAL	CLT	MEM	TEX	PHO	HOM	65th	661	
2011	Pastrana-Waltrip Racing	99	Toyota	DAY; 9	PHO	LVS	BRI	CAL	TEX	TAL; 31	NSH	RCH	DAR	DOV	IOW	CLT	CHI	MCH	ROA	DAY	KEN	NHA	NSH	IRP	IOW	GLN	CGV	BRI	ATL	RCH	CHI	DOV	KAN	CLT	TEX	PHO	HOM		117th	0^{1}	
^{†} - Qualified but replaced by Dick Trickle·

==== Camping World Truck Series ====
NASCAR Camping World Truck Series results
Year	Team	No.	Make	1	2	3	4	5	6	7	8	9	10	11	12	13	14	15	16	17	18	19	20	21	22	23	24	25	26	27	NCWTC	Pts	Ref
1996	Michael Waltrip Racing	1	Ford	HOM	PHO	POR	EVG	TUS	CNS	HPT	BRI	NZH	MLW	LVL	I70	IRP	FLM	GLN	NSV	RCH	NHA	MAR	NWS	SON	MMR	PHO	LVS; 4				83rd	160	
1997	Michael Waltrip Racing	1	Ford	WDW; 31	TUS	HOM	PHO	POR	EVG	I70	NHA	TEX	BRI	NZH	MLW	LVL	CNS	HPT	IRP	FLM	NSV	GLN	RCH	MAR; 35	SON	MMR	CAL; 7	PHO	LVS		67th	274	
1998	Michael Waltrip Racing	1	Ford	WDW	HOM	PHO	POR	EVG	I70	GLN	TEX	BRI	MLW	NZH	CAL; 31	PPR	IRP	NHA	FLM	NSV	HPT	LVL	RCH	MEM	GTY	MAR	SON	MMR	PHO	LVS	103rd	70	
2004	Morgan-Dollar Motorsports	47	Chevy	DAY	ATL	MAR	MFD	CLT; 5	DOV	TEX	MEM	MLW	KAN	KEN	GTW	MCH															61st	215	
2004	Andy Petree Racing	33	Chevy														IRP; 36	NSH	BRI	RCH	NHA	LVS	CAL	TEX	MAR	PHO	DAR	HOM			61st	215	
2006	Darrell Waltrip Motorsports	12	Toyota	DAY	CAL	ATL	MAR	GTY	CLT	MFD	DOV	TEX	MCH	MLW	KAN	KEN	MEM	IRP	NSH	BRI	NHA	LVS	TAL	MAR	ATL	TEX	PHO	HOM; 17			74th	112	
2011	Vision Aviation Racing	15	Toyota	DAY; 1	PHO	DAR	MAR	NSH	DOV	CLT	KAN	TEX	KEN	IOW	NSH	IRP	POC	MCH	BRI	ATL	CHI	NHA	KEN	LVS	TAL	MAR	TEX	HOM			84th	0^{1}	

^{*} Season still in progress
^{1} Ineligible for series points

=== Sports car racing ===
(key) (Races in bold indicate pole position, Results are overall/class)

==== 24 Hours of Le Mans results ====
24 Hours of Le Mans results
Year	Team	Co-Drivers	Car	Class	Laps	Pos.	Class Pos.
2011	(Italy) AF Corse	(United States) Rob Kaufmann (Portugal) Rui Águas	Ferrari 458 Italia GTC	GTE; Pro	178	DNF	DNF

==== 24 Hours of Daytona ====
24 Hours of Daytona results
Year	Class	No	Team	Car	Co-drivers	Laps	Position	Class Pos.
2012	GT	56	(Italy) AF Waltrip	Ferrari 458	(Portugal) Rui Águas (United States) Rob Kauffman (United States) Travis Pastrana	645	35	22
2013	GT	56	(Italy) AF Waltrip	Ferrari 458	(Portugal) Rui Águas (United States) Rob Kauffman (United States) Clint Bowyer	677	16	8

=== Superstar Racing Experience ===
(key) * – Most laps led. ^{1} – Heat 1 winner. ^{2} – Heat 2 winner.

Superstar Racing Experience results
Year	No.	1	2	3	4	5	6	SRXC	Pts
2021	15	STA; 11	KNX; 4	ELD; 10	IRP; 6	SLG; 12	NSV; 7	8th	111
2022	15	FIF; 13	SBO; 11	STA; 12	NSV; 8	I55; 7	SHA; 13	9th	95

^{*} Season still in progress

== See also ==
- List of Daytona 500 winners
- List of NASCAR Sprint All-Star Race drivers
- List of people from Kentucky
- Michael Waltrip Racing

Sporting positions
Preceded by Larry Hoopaugh	NASCAR Darlington Dash Series Champion; 1983	Succeeded by Mike Swaim
Achievements
Preceded by Jeff Gordon	The Winston Winner; 1996	Succeeded by Jeff Gordon
Preceded by Dale Jarrett; Ward Burton	Daytona 500 Winner; 2001; 2003	Succeeded by Ward Burton; Dale Earnhardt Jr.
