= Dean Combs =

American stock car racing driver

- Born: February 23, 1952 (age 74); North Wilkesboro, North Carolina, U.S.
- Achievements: 1975, 1976, 1977 NASCAR Baby Grand Series Champion; 1980, 1981 NASCAR International Sedan Series Champion

NASCAR Cup Series career
- 24 races run over 4 years
- Best finish: 39th (1984)
- First race: 1981 Holly Farms 400 (North Wilkesboro)
- Last race: 1984 Atlanta Journal 500 (Atlanta)
Wins	Top tens	Poles
0	1	0
- Statistics up to date as of January 15, 2012.

Dean Combs (born February 23, 1952) is an American former NASCAR driver. In his limited career, Combs competed in twenty-four Winston Cup Series events. Combs is best known for dominance on NASCAR's lower level Dash Series in the 1970s and 1980s. He had five championships in that series, and was the all-time wins leader in that series before it closed up in 2004.

== Winston Cup ==
=== 1981 ===
Combs made his entrance into the series in 1981, driving for two races late in the season. Driving for the #77 of Irv Sanderson, Combs made his debut at North Wilkesboro. He qualified well, putting it in with an 11th-place lap. Eventually, rear end problems sidelined Combs to 28th. Combs again qualified well at Rockingham, but fell out once again due to mechanical problems to 34th.

=== 1982 ===
Combs upped his races to five starts in 1982, beginning with a 38th at Charlotte. Including that race, Combs only managed to finish two of his five starts. However, those two were fairly impressive. Both races came at Michigan and the result was a 17th place and a 13th place showing.

=== 1983 ===
Combs continued on his five-race pace in 1983, continuing to drive Sanderson's cars. He still struggled to finish races, falling out of two of the events. Yet, once again, if Combs finished he had good finishes. He was 13th at Charlotte, 20th at Michigan and at Atlanta, Combs grabbed his only top-ten with a solid eighth-place finish.

=== 1984 ===
Combs biggest year came in 1984, when he competed in twelve events. However, judging by the nine DNFs it was not exactly successful. The only races he did finish were an 18th at Charlotte, 19th at Daytona and 25th at Richmond. After finishing 39th in points, Combs and Sanderson finally split and Combs went back to lower level racing.

== Racing career results ==
NASCAR Winston Cup Series results
Year	Team/Owner	No.	Make	1	2	3	4	5	6	7	8	9	10	11	12	13	14	15	16	17	18	19	20	21	22	23	24	25	26	27	28	29	30	31	NWCC	Pts	Ref
1981	Irv Sanderson	77	Buick																											NWI 28		ROC 34			n/a	n/a	
1982	Irv Sanderson	77	Buick												CLS 38			MCH 17					MCH 13					NWI 26	CLS 34						43rd	431	
1983	Irv Sanderson	77	Buick												CLS 13								MCH 20				DOV 33								42nd	500	
1983	Irv Sanderson	97	Oldsmobile																											CLS 32		ATL 8			42nd	500	
1984	Irv Sanderson	97	Oldsmobile	DAY 19	RCH 25		ATL 32		NWI 31		MAR 27			DOV 29	CLS 18																				39th	903	
1984	Irv Sanderson	97	Chevrolet															MCH 36	DAY 32				MCH 38			RCH DNQ			CLS 28			ATL 36			39th	903	

== Moonshining ==
In 2009, Combs was arrested for the operation of a moonshine still in North Wilkesboro, North Carolina. Officers from the Wilkes County Sheriff's Office destroyed the still with explosives, seizing 200 US gallons (760 L; 170 imp gal) of corn liquor and 3,000 pounds (1,400 kg) of sugar.

Sporting positions
Preceded by Inaugural	NASCAR Baby Grand Series Champion; 1975, 1976, 1977	Succeeded by Larry Hoopaugh
Preceded by Larry Hoopaugh	NASCAR International Sedan Series Champion; 1980, 1981	Succeeded by Larry Hoopaugh
