= Larry Hoopaugh =

American racing driver

- Born: December 20, 1948 (age 77); Charlotte, North Carolina, U.S.

NASCAR O'Reilly Auto Parts Series career
- 8 races run over 3 years
- Best finish: 51st (1984)
- First race: 1982 Miller High Life 300 (Charlotte)
- Last race: 1984 Mello Yello 300 (Charlotte)
Wins	Top tens	Poles
0	1	0
- Statistics up to date as of December 22, 2024.

Larry Hoopaugh (born December 20, 1948) is an American professional stock car racing driver who has competed in the NASCAR Busch Grand National Series and the NASCAR Goody's Dash Series. He is a former champion of the Dash Series, having won the championship in 1978, 1979, and 1982.

Hoopaugh has also previously competed in the NASCAR Classic Series and the Trans Am Championship.

== Motorsports results ==
=== NASCAR ===
(key) (Bold - Pole position awarded by qualifying time. Italics - Pole position earned by points standings or practice time. * – Most laps led.)

==== Busch Grand National Series ====
NASCAR Busch Grand National Series results
Year	Team	No.	Make	1	2	3	4	5	6	7	8	9	10	11	12	13	14	15	16	17	18	19	20	21	22	23	24	25	26	27	28	29	30	31	32	33	34	35	NBGNSC	Pts	Ref
1982	Cox Racing	50	Mercury	DAY	RCH	BRI	MAR	DAR	HCY	SBO	CRW	RCH	LGY	DOV	HCY	CLT	ASH	HCY	SBO	CAR	CRW	SBO	HCY	LGY	IRP	BRI	HCY	RCH	MAR	CLT; 36	HCY	MAR							177th	55	
1983	Cox Racing	50	Pontiac	DAY; 35	RCH	CAR; 30	HCY	MAR	NWS	SBO	GPS	LGY	DOV	BRI	CLT; 29	SBO	HCY	ROU	SBO	ROU	CRW	ROU	SBO	HCY	LGY	IRP	GPS	BRI	HCY	DAR	RCH	NWS	SBO	MAR	ROU	CLT	HCY	MAR	90th	207	
1984	Larry Hoopaugh	46	Pontiac	DAY; 36	RCH	CAR; 9	HCY	MAR	DAR; 24	ROU	NSV	LGY	MLW	DOV	CLT; 24	SBO	HCY	ROU	SBO	ROU	HCY	IRP	LGY	SBO	BRI	DAR	RCH	NWS	CLT	HCY	CAR	MAR							51st	375	

Sporting positions
Preceded by Dean Combs	NASCAR Baby Grand Champion; 1978	Succeeded by Larry Hoopaugh
Preceded by Larry Hoopaugh	NASCAR Baby Grand Champion; 1979	Succeeded by Dean Combs
Preceded by Dean Combs	NASCAR International Sedan Champion; 1982	Succeeded by Michael Waltrip
