= Jersey Shore 150 =

Race at Wall Stadium

NASCAR Whelen Modified Tour
- Venue: Wall Stadium
- Location: Wall Township, New Jersey
- First race: 2003
- Last race: 2023
- Distance: 49.950 miles
- Laps: 150
- Previous names: Busch 150 (2003); Wall Township 150 (2004); Thunder at the Shore (2007)

The Jersey Shore 150 was an annual NASCAR Whelen Modified Tour race held at Wall Stadium in Wall Township, New Jersey, the race was held as a 150-lap, 49.950-mile (80.387 km) event, and was on the schedule from 2003 to 2023, though there were a number of hiatus years in between runnings.

Ron Silk is the final winner of the event.

== History ==
The inaugural race was held on June 29, 2003, and was won by John Blewett III, the 2004 race was won by Reggie Ruggiero, then, the race took a two-year hiatus before returning in 2007, that race was won by Jimmy Blewett, then, Wall Stadium closed in 2008 due to low attendance and development pressures, resulting in the series not returning to the track for another twelve years before returning in 2019, that race was won by Woody Pitkat, then after another two-year hiatus, the race returned in 2022, Jimmy Blewett won the race, which made him the only driver to win this race twice, the final race was held on July 8, 2023, and was won by Ron Silk, on October 20, 2023, the 2024 schedule for the series was announced with Wall Stadium not on it, and the track hasn't returned since.

== Past winners ==
| Year | Date | Winner | Laps | Report | Ref |
|---|---|---|---|---|---|
| 2003 | June 29 | John Blewett III | 153 | Report | |
| 2004 | June 26 | Reggie Ruggiero | 150 | Report | |
2005–2006 - Not held
| 2007 | May 6 | Jimmy Blewett | 50 | Report | |
2008–2018 - Not held
| 2019 | May 18 | Woody Pitkat | 157 | Report | |
2020–2021 - Not held
| 2022 | July 9 | Jimmy Blewett | 150 | Report | |
| 2023 | July 8 | Ron Silk | 150 | Report | |
