= Mohegan Sun 100 =

NASCAR Whelen Modified Tour races at New Hampshire Motor Speedway

NASCAR Whelen Modified Tour at New Hampshire Motor Speedway

NASCAR Whelen Modified Tour
- Venue: New Hampshire Motor Speedway
- Location: Loudon, New Hampshire, United States

Circuit information
- Surface: Asphalt
- Length: 1.058 mi (1.703 km)
- Turns: 4

Stock car races in the NASCAR Whelen Modified Tour have been held at New Hampshire Motor Speedway in Loudon, New Hampshire since 1990.

== History ==
The Whelen Modified Series has been racing since 1990. The current race was originally 125 laps, but in 1997 was reduced to 100 laps. Most events are held during the NASCAR Cup Series' race weekend. Starting in 2018, the September race at Loudon featured the Modifieds as the feature division, with a 250 lap, 264.5 mile event, the all-time record of distance of Whelen Modified Tour in the touring format.

The race in 2020 was shortened to 200 laps due to the effect of the COVID-19 pandemic. In 2021 only one race occurred during the season at New Hampshire Motor Speedway. It was the 100 lap, Whelen 100 as the Musket event was cancelled for 2021 as was the full throttle weekend. When the 2022 schedule was released, the only race listed for New Hampshire was the 100 lap race that accompanies the NASCAR Cup Series weekend in July.

The Modified cars during this race use a restrictor plate. This plate is similar to what the NASCAR O'Reilly Auto Parts Series uses at Daytona International Speedway and Talladega Superspeedway.

== Current race ==
Mohegan Sun 100
- Corporate sponsor: Mohegan Sun
- First race: 1990
- Distance: 105.8 miles (170.3 km)
- Laps: 100
- Previous names: Sunoco Winston 125 (1990); New Hampshire 75 (1992); CMT 100 (1997); Farm Aid on CMT 100 (1998); New Hampshire 100 (1999); ThatLook.com 100 (2000); New England 100 (2001-2003, 2005-2010; 2016); Siemens 100 (2004); F.W. Webb 100 (2011); Town Fair Tire 100 (2012-2013); Sunoco 100 (2014); Andy Blacksmith 100 (2015); Eastern Propane and Oil 100 (2017-2019); Whelen 100 (2021); Whelen: Manufactured in America 100 (2022); Mohegan Sun 100 (2023–)

The Mohegan Sun 100 is a NASCAR Whelen Modified Tour race at New Hampshire Motor Speedway.

=== Past winners ===
Year	Date	Driver	Event name
1990	September 2	Mike McLaughlin	Sunoco Winston 125
1991	Not Held		
1992	July 11	Reggie Ruggiero	New Hampshire 75
1993	Not Held		
1997	September 13	Reggie Ruggiero	CMT 100
1998	August 29	Mike Ewanitsko	Farm Aid on CMT 100
1999	September 18	Tony Hirschman Jr.	New Hampshire 100
2000	July 7	John Blewett III	ThatLook.com 100
2001	July 20	Tony Hirschman Jr.	New England 100
2002	July 20	Jan Leaty	New England 100
2003	July 18	Chuck Hossfeld	New England 100
2004	July 23	Ted Christopher	Siemens 100
2005	July 15	Ted Christopher	New England 100
2006	July 15	John Blewett III	New England 100
2007	June 30	Donny Lia	New England 100
2008	June 28	Chuck Hossfeld	New England 100
2009	June 27	Donny Lia	New England 100
2010	June 26	Ryan Newman	New England 100
2011	July 16	Todd Szegedy	F.W. Webb 100
2012	July 24	Mike Stefanik	Town Fair Tire 100
2013	July 13	Doug Coby	Town Fair Tire 100
2014	July 12	Bobby Santos III	Sunoco 100
2015	July 18	Todd Szegedy	Andy Blacksmith 100
2016	July 16	Doug Coby	New England 100
2017	July 15	Bobby Santos III	Eastern Propane and Oil 100
2018	July 21	Bobby Santos III	Eastern Propane and Oil 100
2019	July 20	Ron Silk	Eastern Propane and Oil 100
2020	Not Held		
2021	July 17	Ryan Preece	Whelen 100
2022	July 16	Anthony Nocella	Whelen: Manufactured in America 100
2023	July 15	Justin Bonsignore	Mohegan Sun 100
2024	June 22	Justin Bonsignore	Mohegan Sun 100
2025	September 20	Tyler Rypkema	Mohegan Sun 100
2026	August 22	Jon McKennedy	Mohegan Sun 100

== Former second race ==
Musket 200 presented by Whelen
- First race: 2000
- Last race: 2020
- Previous names: Featherlite Modified Series 100 (2000); New Hampshire 100 (2002-2003); Siemens 100 (2004); Sylvania 100 (2004-2005); F.W. Webb 100 (2010, 2012–2017); Musket 250 (2018-2019); Musket 200 (2020)

The Musket 200 presented by Whelen was a NASCAR Whelen Modified Tour race at New Hampshire Motor Speedway.

=== Past winners ===
Year	Date	Driver	Event name
2000	September 16	Mike Ewanitsko	Featherlite Modified Series 100
2001	Not Held		
2002	September 14	Chuck Hossfeld	New Hampshire 100
2003	September 12	John Blewett III	New Hampshire 100
2004	September 20	Ted Christopher	SYLVANIA 100 presented by Lowe's
2005	September 16	Ted Christopher	SYLVANIA 100 presented by Lowe's
2006	September 15	John Blewett III	New Hampshire 100
2007	September 15	Todd Szegedy	New Hampshire 75
2008	September 13	Ted Christopher	New Hampshire 100
2009	September 19	Ron Silk	New Hampshire 100
2010	September 18	Ryan Newman	F.W. Webb 100
2011	September 24	Ron Silk	New Hampshire 100
2012	September 22	Doug Coby	F.W. Webb 100
2013	September 22	Todd Szegedy	F.W. Webb 100
2014	September 20	Woody Pitkat	F.W. Webb 100
2015	September 26	Doug Coby	F.W. Webb 100
2016	September 24	Justin Bonsignore	F.W. Webb 100
2017	September 23	Bobby Santos III	F.W. Webb 100
2018	September 22	Chase Dowling	Musket 250
2019	September 21	Bobby Santos III	Musket 250 presented by Whelen
2020	September 12	Bobby Santos III	Musket 200 presented by Whelen

== Twin races ==
=== Past winners ===
Year	Date	Driver	Event name
1991	April 14	Mike Stefanik	New Hampshire Lottery Twin 125s
1991	August 25	Doug Heveron	ADAP/Auto Palace Doubleheader 150
1992	May 3	Jeff Fuller	New Hampshire Lottery Twin 125s
1992	September 20	Reggie Ruggiero	Auto Palace Doubleheader 150
1993	May 2	Reggie Ruggiero	Tri-State Megabucks Twin 125s
1993	July 10	Reggie Ruggiero	Winston Shootout 40
1994	April 17	Reggie Ruggiero	Tri-State Megabucks Twin 125s
1994	July 9	Jeff Fuller	NYNEX Yellow Pages 40
1994	August 21	Steve Park	New Hampshire 40
1994	September 25	Jeff Fuller	NASCAR Doubleheader 125
1995	April 9	Mike Ewanitsko	Tri-State Megabucks Twins
1995	July 8	Steve Park	Auto Palace 40
1995	August 20	Mike Stefanik	New Hampshire 40
1995	September 24	Steve Park	NYNEX Yellow Pages Doubleheader 125
1996	June 2	Tony Hirschman Jr.	Tri-State Megabucks Twins
1996	August 18	Tony Hirschman Jr.	New Hampshire 75
1996	September 7	Steve Park	Pennzoil 40
1996	September 8	Tony Hirschman Jr.	Pennzoil/VIP Tripleheader 125
1997	May 31	Mike Stefanik	Pennzoil / VIP Tripleheader
1997	July 12	Tim Connolly	Pennzoil / Replacement Auto Parts 50
1997	August 17	Jan Leaty	New Hampshire 125

== Granite State Classic ==
Granite State Classic
- First race: 2011
- Last race: 2011
- Previous names: Granite State Classic (2011)

The Granite State Classic was a NASCAR Whelen Modified Tour race at New Hampshire Motor Speedway held in 2011.

=== Past winners ===
Year	Date	Driver	Event name
2011	August 13	Mike Stefanik	Granite State Classic
