= 2009 NASCAR Whelen Modified Tour =

The 2009 NASCAR Whelen Modified Tour was the 25th season of the Whelen Modified Tour (WMT). It began with the Icebreaker 150 at Thompson Speedway Motorsports Park on April 5. It ended with the World Series of Speedway Racing at Thompson again on October 25. Ted Christopher entered the season as the defending Drivers' Champion. Donny Lia won the 2009 championship after 13 races, 16 points ahead of Ryan Preece.

== Schedule ==
No.	Race title	Track	Date
1	Icebreaker 150	Thompson Speedway Motorsports Park, Thompson, Connecticut	April 5
2	Tech Net Spring Sizzler Presented by CarQuest	Stafford Motor Speedway, Stafford, Connecticut	April 26
3	TSI Harley-Davidson Classic	Stafford Motor Speedway, Stafford, Connecticut	May 22
4	New England 100	New Hampshire Motor Speedway, Loudon, New Hampshire	June 27
5	Spencer Speedway 155	Spencer Speedway, Williamson, New York	July 12
6	Riverhead 175	Riverhead Raceway, Riverhead, New York	August 1
7	Town Fair Tire 150	Stafford Motor Speedway, Stafford, Connecticut	August 7
8	UNOH Perfect Storm (Note: The UNOH Perfect Storm was held as a combined event, with competitors from the Whelen Modified Tour competing along with competitors for the Whelen Southern Modified Tour. The race was run with a series-based point distribution, where drivers received points and statistical credit for their finish relative to other drivers in their series, not to the whole field in general.)	Bristol Motor Speedway, Bristol, Tennessee	August 19
9	Budweiser 150 Presented by N.E. Dodge Dealers	Thompson Speedway Motorsports Park, Thompson, Connecticut	September 2
10	New Hampshire 100	New Hampshire Motor Speedway, Loudon, New Hampshire	September 19
11	Made In America Whelen 300 (Note: The Made In America Whelen 300 was held as a combined event, with competitors from the Whelen Modified Tour competing along with competitors for the Whelen Southern Modified Tour. The race was run with a series-based point distribution, where drivers received points and statistical credit for their finish relative to other drivers in their series, not to the whole field in general.)	Martinsville Speedway, Martinsville, Virginia	September 27
12	CarQuest Fall Final	Stafford Motor Speedway, Stafford, Connecticut	October 4
13	World Series of Speedway Racing	Thompson Speedway Motorsports Park, Thompson, Connecticut	October 25

== Results and standings ==
=== Races ===
No.	Race	Pole position	Most laps led	Winning driver	Manufacturer
1	Icebreaker 150	Ted Christopher	Ted Christopher	Ted Christopher	Chevrolet
2	Tech Net Spring Sizzler Presented by CarQuest	Ted Christopher	Ted Christopher	Ted Christopher	Chevrolet
3	TSI Harley-Davidson Classic	Ted Christopher	Jimmy Blewett	Jimmy Blewett	Chevrolet
4	New England 100	Doug Coby	Todd Szegedy	Donny Lia	Dodge
5	Spencer Speedway 155	Ted Christopher	Todd Szegedy	Erick Rudolph	Chevrolet
6	Riverhead 175	Ryan Preece	Ryan Preece	Ryan Preece	Chevrolet
7	Town Fair Tire 150	Eric Berndt	Ted Christopher	Ryan Preece	Chevrolet
8	UNOH Perfect Storm	Ted Christopher	Ted Christopher	Donny Lia	Dodge
9	Budweiser 150 Presented by N.E. Dodge Dealers	Donny Lia	Ted Christopher	Donny Lia	Dodge
10	New Hampshire 100	Ryan Preece	Ron Silk	Ron Silk	Chevrolet
11	Made In America Whelen 300	Ron Silk	Chris Pasteryak	Mike Stefanik	Pontiac
12	CarQuest Fall Final	Donny Lia	Donny Lia	Donny Lia	Dodge
13	World Series of Speedway Racing	Donny Lia	Ted Christopher	Ted Christopher	Chevrolet

=== Drivers' championship ===
(key) Bold - Pole position awarded by time. Italics - Pole position set by final practice results or rainout. * – Most laps led.

Pos	Driver	THO	STA	STA	NHA	SPE	RIV	STA	BRI	THO	NHA	MAR	STA	THO	Points
1	Donny Lia	3	6	15	1	6	24	7	1	**1**	2	8	**1***	4	2020
2	Ryan Preece	4	3	10	24	5	**1****	1	3	18	**3**	3	3	2	2004
3	Ted Christopher	**1***	**1***	**2**	5	10	20	2*	2*	2*	7	30	31	1*	1931
4	Rowan Pennink	9	26	7	4	4	10	5	7	4	6	16	6	5	1867
5	Todd Szegedy	5	2	3	8*	2*	8	10	6	3	29	2	20	29	1823
6	Chris Pasteryak	33	5	6	25	14	9	3	16	13	12	15*	5	6	1691
7	Mike Stefanik	7	4	4	23	7	19	29	25	32	5	1	8	20	1650
8	Eric Beers	11	16	11	16	19	6	4	14	6	24	23	7	18	1645
9	Woody Pitkat	19	7	8	9	13	15	9	5	21	26	20	16	10	1621
10	Ed Flemke Jr.	16	10	12	2	20	16	13	8	17	30	12	13	14	1602
11	Eric Goodale	23	11	27	17	8	17	15	12	20	17	9	11	12	1546
12	Erick Rudolph	31	30	29	32	1	DNQ	6	10	10	9	36	10	7	1477
13	Jamie Tomaino	13	12	14	26	27	7	11	17	12	32	10	21	23	1469
14	Glen Reen	12	18	13	19	17	5	26	32	9	31	22	22	16	1453
15	Glenn Tyler	28	17	18	10	12	14	12	35	14	27	31	15	15	1442
16	Ron Silk	6	8	24	3	9	27	30	33		1*	**4**		9	1419
17	Ken Heagy	22	19	22	13	18	21	25	26	19	21	28	12	22	1369
18	Doug Coby	8	28	9	**6**	25	22	28		31	11		2	3	1308
19	Wade Cole	29	22	21	15	24	18	19	34	33	22	33	19	28	1237
20	Kevin Goodale	14	14	23	18	Wth	13	27		29	20	6	29	8	1203
21	Johnny Bush	30	DNQ	DNQ	22	23	DNQ	23	22	30	18	18	23	24	1162
22	Bobby Grigas III	10	15	25	11	11	23	32	15	8	40				1076
23	Jimmy Blewett	2	9	1*	28	22	12	8	31						1039
24	Jake Marosz	35	25	26	27		DNQ	31	36	23	25	14	24	26	1029
25	Gary McDonald		DNQ	DNQ	38	16	DNQ	22		22	23	19	18	21	962
26	Richard Savary	32	24	28	7			18	20	11	36			17	910
27	Renee Dupuis	18	32	31	36	26		24		28	14		32	19	850
28	Reggie Ruggiero	26	33	5	14			20			4		9		826
29	Rob Summers	34	29	17	12					27	15		27	11	788
30	James Civali								40	25	13	13	4	25	676
31	Eric Berndt	24	13	20				**16**		7			25		667
32	Andy Seuss	17	DNQ	16	21			21	11^{1}	15		21^{1}			606
33	Joe Hartmann	20	27	DNQ						16	16		28		494
34	Tim Arre				29			14		26	38		14		452
35	Tom Abele Jr.	27	31	19	20										361
36	Tommy Farrell	25	20	30	37										316
37	Keith Rocco									5	33		26		304
38	Chuck Hossfeld					3					10				299
39	Ryan Newman				34				37		8				291
40	Danny Knoll			DNQ^{2}		21		17							273
41	Carl Pasteryak	21	23										30		267
42	Tony Ferrante Jr.	15								24					209
43	Matt Hirschman		21						39						185
44	Richie Pallai Jr.			DNQ^{2}									17		179
45	Kasey Kahne				31				28						179
46	Anthony Sesely				30						19				179
47	Dave Brigati						2								170
48	Howie Brode						3								165
49	Justin Bonsignore						4								160
50	Bobby Santos III										37			27	134
51	Bill Park						11								130
52	Rob Fuller				33						34				125
53	Zach Sylvester													13	124
54	Buck Catalano					15									118
55	Jon McKennedy				35						35				116
56	Chuck Steuer						25								88
57	John Fortin						26								85
58	Frank Vigliarolo Jr.						28								79
59	Mike Christopher										28				79
60	Fred Vordermeier				DNQ^{2}										46
61	Eddie MacDonald										39				46
Drivers ineligible for NWMT points, because at the combined events they chose to drive for NWSMT points
	George Brunnhoelzl III								4			7			
	Burt Myers								9			5			
	Frank Fleming								21			11			
	L. W. Miller								13						
	Jason Myers								27			17			
	Bobby Hutchens								18						
	Brian Loftin								19			29			
	John Smith								23			24			
	Rich Kiuken Jr.								24						
	Jonathan Brown											25			
	Jay Foley											26			
	Buddy Emory								38			27			
	Gene Pack								29			34			
	Bryan Dauzat								30			35			
	Bradley Robbins											32			
	J. R. Bertuccio											37			
	Zach Brewer											38			
	Tommy Neal											39			
	Greg Butcher											40			
	Tim Brown											41			
	Jeremy Stoltz											42			
	Jamie Tomaino Jr.											43			
Pos	Driver	THO	STA	STA	NHA	SPE	RIV	STA	BRI	THO	NHA	MAR	STA	THO	Points

- ^{1} – Scored points towards the Whelen Southern Modified Tour.
- ^{2} – Danny Knoll, Richie Pallai Jr. and Fred Vordermier received championship points, despite the fact that the driver did not qualify for the race.

== See also ==
- 2009 NASCAR Sprint Cup Series
- 2009 NASCAR Nationwide Series
- 2009 NASCAR Camping World Truck Series
- 2009 NASCAR Camping World East Series
- 2009 NASCAR Camping World West Series
- 2009 ARCA Re/Max Series
- 2009 NASCAR Whelen Southern Modified Tour
- 2009 NASCAR Canadian Tire Series
- 2009 NASCAR Mini Stock Series
- 2009 NASCAR Corona Series
