= Tom Abele Jr. =

American racing driver

- Nationality: American
- Born: June 2, 1989 (age 37) Norwich, Connecticut, U.S.

NASCAR Whelen Modified Tour career
- Debut season: 2007
- Years active: 2007–2009, 2016
- Starts: 18
- Championships: 0
- Wins: 0
- Poles: 0
- Best finish: 21st in 2008
- Statistics up to date as of September 17, 2024.

Tom Abele Jr. (born June 2, 1989) is an American professional stock car racing driver who competed in the NASCAR Whelen Modified Tour from 2007 to 2016. Abele operates Thirty Two Signs, a graphic design company that provides the lettering and vinyl for many race teams.

Abele has also previously competed in series such as the now defunct NASCAR Whelen Southern Modified Tour, the PASS North Super Late Model Series, the PASS National Championship Super Late Model Series, the Modified Racing Series, the Allison Legacy Race Series, and the EXIT Realty Modified Touring Series.

== Motorsports results ==
=== NASCAR ===
(key) (Bold – Pole position awarded by qualifying time. Italics – Pole position earned by points standings or practice time. * – Most laps led.)

==== Whelen Modified Tour ====
NASCAR Whelen Modified Tour results
| Year | Team | No. | Make | 1 | 2 | 3 | 4 | 5 | 6 | 7 | 8 | 9 | 10 | 11 | 12 | 13 | 14 | 15 | 16 | 17 | NWMTC | Pts | Ref |
|---|---|---|---|---|---|---|---|---|---|---|---|---|---|---|---|---|---|---|---|---|---|---|---|
| 2007 | Tom Abele Sr. | 32 | Chevy | TMP | STA | WTO | STA | TMP | NHA | TSA | RIV | STA | TMP | MAN | MAR | NHA | TMP | STA | TMP; DNQ | | 68th | 49 | |
| 2008 | Tom Abele Sr. | 32 | Chevy | TMP; 5 | STA; 17 | STA; DNQ | TMP; 18 | NHA; 32 | SPE; 22 | RIV; DNQ | STA; DNQ | TMP; 12 | MAN; 25 | TMP; 20 | NHA; 28 | MAR; 16 | CHE; 20 | STA; 27 | TMP; 20 | | 21st | 1520 | |
| 2009 | Tom Abele Sr. | 32 | Chevy | TMP; 27 | STA; 31 | STA; 19 | NHA; 20 | SPE | RIV | STA | BRI | TMP | NHA | MAR | STA | TMP | | | | | 35th | 361 | |
| 2016 | Tom Abele Jr. | 32 | Chevy | TMP | STA | WFD; 16 | STA | TMP | RIV | NHA | MND | STA | TMP | BRI | RIV | OSW | SEE | NHA | STA | TMP | 45th | 28 | |

==== Whelen Southern Modified Tour ====
NASCAR Whelen Southern Modified Tour results
| Year | Car owner | No. | Make | 1 | 2 | 3 | 4 | 5 | 6 | 7 | 8 | 9 | 10 | NWSMTC | Pts | Ref |
|---|---|---|---|---|---|---|---|---|---|---|---|---|---|---|---|---|
| 2015 | Tom Abele Sr. | 32 | Chevy | CRW; 9 | CRW; 18 | SBO | LGY; 15 | CRW; 14 | BGS; 18 | BRI; DNQ | LGY | SBO | CLT | 18th | 146 | |
