= Johnny Bush (racing driver) =

American racing driver

- Nationality: American
- Born: August 6, 1954 (age 72) Huntington Station, New York, U.S.

NASCAR Whelen Modified Tour career
- Debut season: 1994
- Years active: 1989–1995, 1997, 2003–2004, 2009–2010, 2012, 2015–2016
- Starts: 74
- Championships: 0
- Wins: 0
- Poles: 0
- Best finish: 20th in 1992
- Statistics up to date as of August 29, 2024.

Johnny Bush (born August 6, 1954) is an American former professional stock car racing driver who competed in the NASCAR Whelen Modified Tour from 1989 to 2016.

Bush has also competed in series such as the SMART Modified Tour, the Modified Racing Series, the Race of Champions Asphalt Modified Tour, and the World Series of Asphalt Stock Car Racing.

== Motorsports results ==
=== NASCAR ===
(key) (Bold – Pole position awarded by qualifying time. Italics – Pole position earned by points standings or practice time. * – Most laps led.)

==== Whelen Modified Tour ====
NASCAR Whelen Modified Tour results
Year	Team	No.	Make	1	2	3	4	5	6	7	8	9	10	11	12	13	14	15	16	17	18	19	20	21	22	23	24	25	26	NWMTC	Pts	Ref
1989	Johnny Bush	68	Chevy	MAR	TMP	MAR	JEN	STA	IRP	OSW	WFD	MND	RIV; 25	OSW	JEN	STA	RPS	RIV	OSW	TMP	TMP	RPS	OSW	TMP	POC	STA	TIO	MAR	TMP	N/A	0	
1990	Johnny Bush	68	Chevy	MAR	TMP	RCH	STA	MAR	STA	TMP	MND	HOL	STA	RIV	JEN	EPP	RPS	RIV	TMP	RPS; DNQ	NHA	TMP; 21	POC	STA	TMP	MAR				N/A	0	
1991	Johnny Bush	68	Chevy	MAR	RCH	TMP	NHA	MAR	NZH; 23	STA	TMP; 16	FLE; 19	OXF	RIV	JEN	STA	RPS	RIV	RCH; 27	TMP	NHA	TMP; 8	POC	STA; 26	TMP; 19	MAR				27th	995	
1992	Johnny Bush	68	Chevy	MAR; 31	TMP	RCH; 7	STA; 18	MAR; 13	NHA; 15	NZH; 26	STA; 19	TMP; 22	FLE; 10	RIV	NHA; 6	STA; 20	RPS	RIV; 14	TMP; 7	TMP; 27	NHA; 30	STA; 26	MAR; 24	TMP; 29						20th	2044	
1993	Johnny Bush	68	Chevy	RCH; 35	STA; 18	TMP; 13	NHA; 27	NZH; 30	STA	RIV; 14	NHA	RPS	HOL	LEE	RIV	STA	TMP	TMP	STA	TMP										30th	689	
1994	Johnny Bush	68	Chevy	NHA; 27	STA; 16	TMP; 13	NZH; 32	STA; 14	LEE; 18	TMP; 26	RIV	TIO	NHA	RPS	HOL	TMP	RIV	NHA	STA	SPE	TMP									30th	876	
1994	Hill Enterprises	78	Pontiac																			NHA; 19	STA	TMP						30th	876	
1995	N/A	68	Chevy	TMP	NHA	STA	NZH	STA	LEE	TMP	RIV	BEE	NHA	JEN	RPS	HOL	RIV	NHA	STA	TMP; 22	NHA	STA	TMP	TMP						N/A	0	
1997	N/A	68	Chevy	TMP	MAR	STA	NZH	STA	NHA	FLE	JEN	RIV	GLN	NHA	RPS	HOL	TMP	RIV	NHA; 23	GLN	STA	NHA	STA	FLE	TMP	RCH				N/A	0	
2003	N/A	68	Chevy	TMP	STA	WFD	NZH	STA	LER	BLL	BEE	NHA	ADI	RIV	TMP; DNQ	STA	WFD	TMP	NHA		TMP; DNQ									N/A	0	
2003	N/A	93	Chevy																	STA; DNQ										N/A	0	
2004	N/A	68	Chevy	TMP	STA	WFD	NZH	STA	RIV	LER	WAL	BEE	NHA	SEE	RIV	STA	TMP	WFD	TMP	NHA	STA	TMP; DNQ								N/A	0	
2009	Johnny Bush	68	Chevy	TMP; 30	STA; DNQ	STA; DNQ	NHA; 22	SPE; 23	RIV; DNQ	STA; 23	BRI; 15	TMP; 30	NHA; 18	MAR; 14	STA; 23	TMP; 24														21st	1162	
2010	Johnny Bush	68	Chevy	TMP; 23	STA; 20	STA; 19	MAR; 19	NHA; 26	LIM	MND; 24	RIV; DNQ	STA	TMP; 27	BRI	NHA	STA	TMP													31st	743	
2012	Linda Rodenbaugh	38	Chevy	TMP	STA	MND	STA	WFD; 17	NHA; 20	STA; 14	TMP; 18	BRI	TMP	RIV																26th	149	
2012	Charlene Bush	68	Chevy												NHA; 21	STA	TMP; 25													26th	149	
2015	Beth Cole	33	Chevy	TMP; 34	STA; 19	WAT; 28	STA	TMP	RIV																					33rd	119	
2015	Charlene Bush	68	Chevy							NHA; 19	MON	STA	TMP		RIV; 26	NHA	STA	TMP												33rd	119	
2015	Robert Katon Jr.	13	Chevy											BRI; 19																33rd	119	
2016	Michael Loomis	68	Chevy	TMP	STA	WFD; DNQ	STA	TMP	RIV	NHA	MND	STA	TMP	BRI	RIV; 22	OSW	SEE; 24	NHA	STA	TMP										35th	57	
