= Erick Rudolph =

American racing driver

- Nationality: American
- Born: January 9, 1992 (age 34) Ransomville, New York, U.S.
- Relatives: Charlie Rudolph

Modified racing career
- Debut season: 2006
- Car number: 25
- Championships: 7
- Wins: 203

Championship titles
- 2013 DIRTcar 358 Modified Series Champion

NASCAR Whelen Modified Tour
- Years active: 2008–2011
- Starts: 51
- Wins: 1
- Poles: 2
- Best finish: 8th in 2010

Previous series
- 2005-2023 Wins 1997-2005 Wins: TQ Midgets & Micro Sprints; 24; Kart racing 200+
- Statistics up to date as of July 1, 2025.

Erick Rudolph (born January 9, 1992) is an American professional stock car racing driver credited with over 220 career wins at wins at 50 different tracks across the United States.

== Racing career ==
Rudolph competed in the NASCAR Whelen Modified Tour from 2008 to 2011. He has also competed in series such as the Race of Champions Asphalt Modified Tour, the Super DIRTcar Big-Block Modified Series, the DIRTcar Nationals, and the now defunct NASCAR Whelen Southern Modified Tour. Rudolph claimed the DIRTcar 358-Modified Touring Series title in 2013, 2014, and 2019.

== Personal life ==
Rudolph is the son of former NASCAR Cup Series driver Charlie Rudolph. For many years his grandfather Jim Rudolph, also a former driver, prepared the engines for his modifieds.

== Motorsports results ==
=== NASCAR ===
(key) (Bold – Pole position awarded by qualifying time. Italics – Pole position earned by points standings or practice time. * – Most laps led.)

==== Whelen Modified Tour ====
NASCAR Whelen Modified Tour results
Year	Team	No.	Make	1	2	3	4	5	6	7	8	9	10	11	12	13	14	15	16	NWMTC	Pts	Ref
2008	Dave DeLange	45	Chevy	TMP; 29	STA; 24	STA; 9	TMP	NHA	SPE; 24	RIV	STA; 17	TMP	MAN; 7	TMP	NHA; 7	MAR	CHE; 6	STA	TMP; 5	28th	1105	
2009	Ed Bennett III	59	Chevy	TMP; 31	STA; 30	STA; 29	NHA; 32	SPE; 1	RIV; DNQ	STA; 6	BRI; 8	TMP; 10	NHA; 9	MAR; 23	STA; 10	TMP; 7				12th	1477	
2010	Alan Heinke	98	Chevy	TMP; 19	STA; 9	STA; 8	MAR; 27	NHA; 28	LIM; 6	**MND**; 2*	RIV; 10	STA; 4	TMP; 21	BRI; 9	NHA; 25	STA; 3	TMP; 19			8th	1753	
2011	Alan Heinke	98	Chevy	TMP; 20	STA; 6	STA; 5	MND; 9	TMP; 15	NHA; 16	RIV; 24	STA; 8	NHA; 9	BRI; 21	**DEL**; 14*	TMP; 25	LRP; 7	NHA; 6	STA; 5	TMP; 14	10th	2051	

==== Whelen Southern Modified Tour ====
NASCAR Whelen Southern Modified Tour results
Year	Car owner	No.	Make	1	2	3	4	5	6	7	8	9	10	11	12	13	14	NSWMTC	Pts	Ref
2008	N/A	45	Chevy	CRW; DNQ	ACE	CRW	BGS	CRW	LAN	CRW	SNM	MAR	CRW	CRW				48th	76	
2009	Kyle Bennett	59	Chevy	CON; 5	SBO	CRW; 7	LAN	CRW	BGS	BRI	CRW	MBS	CRW	CRW	MAR	ACE	CRW	27th	301	
