= 2007 NASCAR Whelen Modified Tour =

The 2007 NASCAR Whelen Modified Tour was the 23rd season of the Whelen Modified Tour (WMT). It began with the Icebreaker 150 at Thompson Speedway Motorsports Park on April 15. It ended with the Xtra Mart 150 at Thompson again on October 14. Mike Stefanik entered the season as the defending Drivers' Champion. Donny Lia won the 2007 championship after 16 races, 180 points ahead of Todd Szegedy.

The season was marred with the death of John Blewett III, who was killed in a crash at Thompson on August 16.

== Schedule ==
No.	Race title	Track	Date
1	Icebreaker 150	Thompson Speedway Motorsports Park, Thompson, Connecticut	April 15
2	Carquest Tech-Net Spring Sizzler	Stafford Motor Speedway, Stafford, Connecticut	April 29
3	Thunder at the Shore	Wall Stadium, Wall Township, New Jersey	May 6
4	Connecticut Classic 150	Stafford Motor Speedway, Stafford, Connecticut	May 25
5	Charter Cable Internet & Telephone 150	Thompson Speedway Motorsports Park, Thompson, Connecticut	June 21
6	New England 100	New Hampshire Motor Speedway, Loudon, New Hampshire	June 30
7	Allstate 100	Twin State Speedway, Claremont, New Hampshire	July 8
8	Miller Lite 140	Riverhead Raceway, Riverhead, New York	August 4
9	New England Dodge Dealers 150	Stafford Motor Speedway, Stafford, Connecticut	August 11
10	New England Dodge Dealers 150	Thompson Speedway Motorsports Park, Thompson, Connecticut	August 16
11	Whelen 150	Mansfield Motorsports Park, Mansfield, Ohio	August 23
12	Made In America Whelen 300 (Note: The Made In America Whelen 300 was held as a combined event, with competitors from the Whelen Modified Tour competing along with competitors for the Whelen Southern Modified Tour. The race was run with a series-based point distribution, where drivers received points and statistical credit for their finish relative to other drivers in their series, not to the whole field in general.)	Martinsville Speedway, Martinsville, Virginia	September 1
13	New Hampshire 100	New Hampshire Motor Speedway, Loudon, New Hampshire	September 15
14	Sunoco Modified Mania 150	Thompson Speedway Motorsports Park, Thompson, Connecticut	September 23
15	CarQuest Fall Final	Stafford Motor Speedway, Stafford, Connecticut	September 29
16	Xtra Mart 150	Thompson Speedway Motorsports Park, Thompson, Connecticut	October 14

== Results and standings ==
=== Races ===
No.	Race	Pole position	Most laps led	Winning driver	Manufacturer
1	Icebreaker 150	Todd Szegedy	Donny Lia	James Civali	Chevrolet
2	Carquest Tech-Net Spring Sizzler	Matt Hirschman	Ted Christopher	Donny Lia	Dodge
3	Thunder at the Shore	Reggie Ruggiero	Jimmy Blewett	Jimmy Blewett	Chevrolet
4	Connecticut Classic 150	Tony Hirschman Jr.	Ted Christopher	Donny Lia	Dodge
5	Charter Cable Internet & Telephone 150	Richard Savary	Donny Lia	Donny Lia	Dodge
6	New England 100	Ted Christopher	Donny Lia	Donny Lia	Dodge
7	Allstate 100	Ron Silk	James Civali	James Civali	Chevrolet
8	Miller Lite 140	Ted Christopher	Mike Stefanik	Donny Lia	Dodge
9	New England Dodge Dealers 150	Tony Hirschman Jr.	Ted Christopher	Ted Christopher	Chevrolet
10	New England Dodge Dealers 150	Todd Szegedy	James Civali	Todd Szegedy	Ford
11	Whelen 150	Donny Lia	James Civali	James Civali	Chevrolet
12	Made In America Whelen 300	Donny Lia	Donny Lia	Donny Lia	Dodge
13	New Hampshire 100	Todd Szegedy	Todd Szegedy	Todd Szegedy	Ford
14	Sunoco Modified Mania 150	Donny Lia	Donny Lia	Ron Silk	Chevrolet
15	CarQuest Fall Final	Eric Beers	Mike Stefanik; Todd Szegedy (Note: Stefanik and Szegedy both led 59 laps.)	Mike Stefanik	Chevrolet
16	Xtra Mart 150	Tony Ferrante Jr.	Bobby Santos III	Bobby Santos III	Chevrolet

=== Drivers' championship ===
(key) Bold - Pole position awarded by time. Italics - Pole position set by final practice results or rainout. * – Most laps led.

Pos	Driver	THO	STA	WTO	STA	THO	NHA	TSA	RIV	STA	THO	MFD	MAR	NHA	THO	STA	THO	Points
1	Donny Lia	20*	1	14	1	1*	1*	4	1	5	4	**4**	**1***	3	**8***	7	28	2471
2	Todd Szegedy	**19**	2	8	5	5	5	8	16	2	**1**	9	25	**1***	3	15*	27	2291
3	Matt Hirschman	5	**8**	6	6	13	4	2	7	6	12	7	26	31	11	4	3	2260
4	Ron Silk	3	25	7	21	6	6	**3**	3	20	25	6	20	2	1	5	5	2257
5	Ted Christopher	27	19*	4	28*	2	**2**	5	**15**	1*	8	8	2	25	21	3	4	2187
6	James Civali	1	7	20	2	7	35	1*	5	25	26*	1*	4	6	5	6	32	2178
7	Mike Stefanik	34	4	5	12	15	13	7	11*	3	30	12	34	9	10	1*	8	2077
8	Jimmy Blewett	4	9	1*	13	8	30	10	12	9	15		43	5	15	16	26	1883
9	Jamie Tomaino	28	10	11	7	11	23	11	9	15	7	14	19	19	25	33	15	1872
10	Ed Flemke Jr.	26	23	15	3	20	3	13	14	28	5	18	24	26	24	11	19	1851
11	Eric Beers	11	20	21	10	14	33	16	19	8	13	5	18	22	23	**19**	16	1840
12	Jerry Marquis	21	3	9	18	28	28	6	21	7	27	27	17	11	27	30	17	1765
13	Richard Savary	17	15	30	9	**24**	11	18	22	22	21	13	10	32	16	17	13	1757
14	Richard Houlihan	18	14	25	8	18	22	25	27	11	23	15	7	37	13	18	11	1753
15	Kevin Goodale	16	12	DNQ	25	9	26	12	17	27	34	20	37	15	12	12	6	1715
16	Bobby Grigas III	9	11	29	19	32	39	23	DNQ	23	29	10	14	10	6	13	25	1670
17	Rowan Pennink	14	DNQ	18	DNQ	12	24	17	13	19	24	21	8	39	17	14	14	1634
18	Billy Pauch Jr.	12	21	10	20	34	20	26		13	6	16	23	20	26	29	21	1590
19	Ryan Preece	DNQ	DNQ	27	11	31	18	14	10	30	10	17	28	14	29	31	7	1573
20	Wade Cole	36	16	23	22	19	27	19	28	18	14	22	39	21	22	24	23	1528
21	Tony Hirschman Jr.	31	6		**24**	4	16			**12**	2	11		7	36	2	9	1522
22	Joe Hartmann	DNQ	DNQ	12	DNQ	26	40	15	DNQ	31	18	19	16	18	19	20	29	1396
23	Reggie Ruggiero	23	26	3	26		12			26	22		31	34	2	10	2	1379
24	Danny Sammons	33	22	13	17	16	25	24	6	17	33	25	33	38	35			1312
25	Bobby Santos III	32	32			3	7			32	35		32	4	4	9	1*	1311
26	Glenn Tyler	DNQ	DNQ	DNQ	16	21	36	20	24	24	31	23	41	16		27	18	1272
27	Woody Pitkat					10	14		DNQ	10	17	3	35	24	7	28	31	1219
28	Jake Marosz	DNQ	DNQ	DNQ	DNQ	27	32	21	DNQ	29	37	26	42	29	32	22	DNQ	1063
29	Ron Yuhas Jr.	22	27	19	15	25	8				3			35	14		30	1050
30	Renee Dupuis	35	17	DNQ	DNQ	30				16	36				18	26	10	854
31	Rick Fuller	25	29		30	23	37							12	20	8	24	846
32	Zach Sylvester	10	5	31	4	35	15	22										792
33	Anthony Sesely	30	18	24	DNQ	22					28		38			21	22	786
34	Jon McKennedy	8	DNQ	26	23	DNQ		9						17	33			745
35	Eric Berndt	37			14	29				14	11				28	23	DNQ	734
36	John Blewett III	29	28	2	27	33	10				16							720
37	Doug Coby									4	19	2	27	36			20	706
38	Tony Ferrante Jr.	6		DNQ					25						9		**12**	561
39	Charlie Pasteryak						9			21				13		25	DNQ	560
40	Rob Summers	24	31	17	DNQ		31				32				31			544
41	Chuck Hossfeld	2	13	16	31												DNQ	543
42	Andy Seuss						19				9	24		8				477
43	Carl Pasteryak	7	33		DNQ	17										32		444
44	Jimmy Storace	15	24	22													DNQ	358
45	Jeff Malave	DNQ					21							28		DNQ		280
46	Mike Christopher						34							23		DNQ	DNQ	262
47	Nevin George	13					17											236
48	Gary McDonald	DNQ^{1}	DNQ^{1}						DNQ^{1}					40			DNQ^{1}	209
49	Howie Brode								8							DNQ^{1}		200
50	Ken Heagy	DNQ									20				30			198
51	Ken Bouchard	DNQ				DNQ	38							33				196
52	Bill Park								2									170
53	Justin Bonsignore								4									160
54	Dave Etheridge		DNQ^{1}		DNQ^{1}												DNQ^{1}	153
55	Chris Pasteryak	DNQ^{1}	DNQ^{1}		DNQ^{1}	DNQ^{1}												150
56	Frank Ruocco		30		29													149
57	Alex Hoag						29							30				149
58	Roy Seidell Jr.	DNQ^{1}													34		DNQ^{1}	138
59	J. R. Bertuccio								18									109
60	Dan Jivanelli								20									103
61	Chuck Steuer								23									94
62	Wayne Anderson								26									85
63	J. J. Yeley													27				82
64	Ken Woolley Jr.			28														79
65	Dave Brigati								DNQ^{1}									70
66	Kenny Horton				DNQ^{1}													67
67	Rich Kuiken Jr.			DNQ^{1}														55
68	Tom Abele Jr.																DNQ^{1}	49
	Randy Butner												DNQ					
	Thomas Stinson												DNQ					
	Wesley Swartout												DNQ					
	Earl Baker												DNQ					
	Gene Pack												DNQ					
	Bradley Robbins												DNQ					
	Jason Trinchere												DNQ					
	Jay Mize												DNQ					
Drivers ineligible for NWMT points, because at the combined event at Martinsville they chose to drive for NWSMT points
	L. W. Miller												3					
	Tim Brown												5					
	Brian King												6					
	Jay Foley												9					
	George Brunnhoelzl III												11					
	Jason Myers												12					
	Brandon Hire												13					
	Junior Miller												15					
	Buddy Emory												21					
	Burt Myers												22					
	Brian Pack												29					
	Frank Fleming												30					
	Brian Loftin												36					
	Zach Brewer												40					
Pos	Driver	THO	STA	WTO	STA	THO	NHA	TSA	RIV	STA	THO	MFD	MAR	NHA	THO	STA	THO	Points

- ^{1} – Gary McDonald, Howie Brode, Dave Etheridge, Chris Pasteryak, Roy Seidell Jr., Dave Brigati, Kenny Horton, Rich Kuiken Jr., and Tom Abele Jr. received championship points, despite the fact that the driver did not qualify for the race.

== See also ==
- 2007 NASCAR Nextel Cup Series
- 2007 NASCAR Busch Series
- 2007 NASCAR Craftsman Truck Series
- 2007 NASCAR Busch East Series
- 2007 ARCA Re/Max Series
- 2007 NASCAR Whelen Southern Modified Tour
- 2007 NASCAR Canadian Tire Series
- 2007 NASCAR Corona Series
