= Anthony Sesely =

American racing driver (born 1983)

- Nationality: American
- Born: June 20, 1983 (age 43) Matawan, New Jersey, U.S.

NASCAR Whelen Modified Tour career
- Debut season: 2005
- Years active: 2005–2009, 2019, 2022–2024
- Car number: 16
- Crew chief: James Archibald
- Starts: 61
- Championships: 0
- Wins: 0
- Poles: 0
- Finished last season: 13th (2023)
- Statistics up to date as of August 9, 2024.

Anthony Sesely (born June 20, 1983) is an American professional stock car racing driver who competes part-time in the NASCAR Whelen Modified Tour, and locally in his family owned No. 16.

Raised in Matawan, New Jersey, Sesely graduated from Matawan Regional High School and started racing at the age of seven.

Sesely has also competed in series such as the Tri-Track Open Modified Series, the Modified Racing Series, the SMART Modified Tour, and the World Series of Asphalt Stock Car Racing.

== Motorsports results ==
=== NASCAR ===
(key) (Bold – Pole position awarded by qualifying time. Italics – Pole position earned by points standings or practice time. * – Most laps led.)

==== Whelen Modified Tour ====
NASCAR Whelen Modified Tour results
Year	Car owner	No.	Make	1	2	3	4	5	6	7	8	9	10	11	12	13	14	15	16	17	18	NWMTC	Pts	Ref
2005	N/A	09	Chevy	TMP	STA	RIV	WFD	STA	JEN	NHA	BEE	SEE	RIV	STA	TMP; 13	WFD	MAR; 13	TMP	NHA; 16	STA; DNQ	TMP	40th	479	
2006	Anthony Sesely	11	Chevy	TMP; 22	STA; DNQ	JEN; 20	TMP; 15	STA; 8	NHA; 21	HOL; 23	RIV; 21	STA; 11	TMP; 19	MAR; 14	TMP; 31	NHA; 18	WFD; 9	TMP; 29	STA; 24			20th	1596	
2007	Anthony Sesely	11	Chevy	TMP; 30	STA; 18	WTO; 24	STA; DNQ	TMP; 22	NHA	TSA	RIV	STA	TMP; 28	MAN	MAR; 25	NHA	TMP	STA; 21	TMP; 22			33rd	786	
2008	Tony Sesely	11	Chevy	TMP; 11	STA; 15	STA; 27	TMP; 27	NHA; 30	SPE; 11	RIV; 22	STA; 30	TMP; 13	MAN	TMP	NHA; 26	MAR	CHE	STA; 8	TMP			27th	1136	
2009	Anthony Sesely	11	Chevy	TMP	STA	STA	NHA; 30	SPE	RIV	STA	BRI	TMP	NHA; 19	MAR	STA	TMP						46th	179	
2019	Joe Yannone	11	Chevy	MYR	SBO	TMP	STA	WAL; 21	SEE	TMP	RIV	NHA	STA	TMP	OSW	RIV	NHA	STA	TMP			64th	23	
2022	Tommy Wanick	19	Chevy	NSM	RCH	RIV	LEE	JEN	MND	RIV	WAL; 21	NHA	CLM; 14	TMP	LGY	OSW; 19	RIV	TMP	MAR			43rd	78	
2023	Tommy Wanick	19	Chevy	NSM; 4	RCH; 26	MON; 25	RIV	LEE	SEE; 5	RIV	WAL; 4	NHA; 6	LMP; 17	THO; 9	LGY	OSW; 4	MON	RIV	NWS; 11	THO; 15	MAR; 14	13th	389	
2024	Tommy Wanick	19	Chevy	NSM; 28	RCH; 12	THO; 11	MON; 13	RIV; 23	SEE; 16	NHA	MON; Wth	LMP	THO; 13	OSW	RIV	MON; 17	THO	NWS	MAR			16th	220	
