= Howie Brode =

American racing driver

- Nationality: American
- Born: December 8, 1963 (age 62) Bay Shore, New York, U.S.

NASCAR Whelen Modified Tour career
- Debut season: 1998
- Years active: 1998–2007, 2009–2013
- Starts: 57
- Championships: 0
- Wins: 0
- Poles: 1
- Best finish: 16th in 2003
- Statistics up to date as of September 30, 2024.

Howie Brode (born December 8, 1963) is an American professional stock car racing driver who competed in the NASCAR Whelen Modified Tour from 1998 to 2013. He is the father of Matthew Brode, a current competitor in the modified division at the Riverhead Raceway.

Brode is a frequent competitor in the modified divisions at Riverhead Raceway, where he has gained since gained sixteen wins since 1998.

== Motorsports results ==
=== NASCAR ===
(key) (Bold – Pole position awarded by qualifying time. Italics – Pole position earned by points standings or practice time. * – Most laps led.)

==== Whelen Modified Tour ====
NASCAR Whelen Modified Tour results
| Year | Team | No. | Make | 1 | 2 | 3 | 4 | 5 | 6 | 7 | 8 | 9 | 10 | 11 | 12 | 13 | 14 | 15 | 16 | 17 | 18 | 19 | 20 | 21 | 22 | NWMTC | Pts | Ref |
|---|---|---|---|---|---|---|---|---|---|---|---|---|---|---|---|---|---|---|---|---|---|---|---|---|---|---|---|---|
| 1998 | Peter Clark | 96 | Chevy | RPS; 25 | TMP | MAR | STA | NZH | STA | GLN | JEN | RIV; 19 | NHA | NHA | LEE | HOL | TMP | NHA | RIV; 2 | STA | NHA | TMP | STA | TMP | FLE | 49th | 383 | |
| 1999 | Peter Clark | 96 | Chevy | TMP; DNQ | RPS; DNQ | STA | RCH | STA | RIV; 8 | JEN | NHA | NZH | HOL | TMP | NHA | RIV; 25 | GLN | STA | RPS | TMP | NHA | STA; 25 | MAR; DNQ | TMP; DNQ | | 45th | 478 | |
| 2000 | Peter Clark | 96 | Chevy | STA; DNQ | RCH | STA; 20 | RIV; 4 | SEE | NHA | NZH | TMP | RIV; 9 | GLN | TMP | STA; DNQ | WFD | NHA | STA; 19 | MAR; 25 | TMP; DNQ | | | | | | 40th | 743 | |
| 2001 | Peter Clark | 96 | Chevy | SBO; DNQ | TMP; DNQ | STA; 19 | WFD; 16 | NZH; DNQ | STA; DNQ | RIV; DNQ | SEE; 15 | RCH | NHA | HOL | RIV; 6 | CHE | TMP; DNQ | STA; 16 | WFD; 28 | TMP; 21 | STA; DNQ | MAR; 19 | TMP; DNQ | | | 27th | 1302 | |
| 2002 | Peter Clark | 96 | Chevy | TMP; DNQ | STA; DNQ | WFD; 23 | NZH; 33 | RIV; 21 | SEE; DNQ | RCH | STA; 17 | BEE | NHA; 41 | RIV; 10 | TMP | STA | WFD; 14 | TMP; 10 | NHA | STA; DNQ | MAR; 15 | TMP; DNQ | | | | 28th | 1095 | |
| 2003 | Peter Clark | 96 | Chevy | TMP; DNQ | STA; 22 | WFD; 11 | NZH; 16 | STA; 19 | LER; 23 | BLL; 10 | BEE; 15 | NHA; 30 | ADI; 8 | RIV; 3 | TMP; 30 | STA; 24 | WFD; 28 | TMP; 16 | NHA; 34 | STA; 16 | TMP; 25 | | | | | 16th | 1842 | |
| 2004 | Peter Clark | 96 | Chevy | TMP; 28 | STA; 16 | WFD; 18 | NZH | STA | RIV; DNQ | LER | WAL; DNQ | BEE | NHA | SEE | RIV; 9 | STA | TMP | WFD | TMP | NHA | STA; DNQ | TMP | | | | 46th | 573 | |
| 2005 | Peter Clark | 96 | Chevy | TMP; 30 | STA; DNQ | RIV; DNQ | WFD | STA | JEN | NHA | BEE | SEE | RIV; 12 | STA | TMP | WFD | MAR | TMP | NHA | STA; DNQ | TMP; DNQ | | | | | 45th | 359 | |
| 2006 | Peter Clark | 96 | Chevy | TMP | STA | JEN | TMP | STA | NHA | HOL | RIV; 8 | STA | TMP | MAR | TMP | NHA | WFD | TMP | STA | | | | | | | 55th | 142 | |
| 2007 | Peter Clark | 96 | Chevy | TMP | STA | WTO | STA | TMP | NHA | TSA | RIV; 8 | STA | TMP | MAN | MAR | NHA | TMP | STA; DNQ | TMP | | | | | | | 49th | 200 | |
| 2009 | Peter Clark | 96 | Chevy | TMP | STA | STA | NHA | SPE | RIV; 3 | STA | BRI | TMP | NHA | MAR | STA | TMP | | | | | | | | | | 48th | 165 | |
| 2010 | Peter Clark | 96 | Chevy | TMP | STA | STA | MAR | NHA | LIM | MND | RIV; 28 | STA | TMP | BRI | NHA | STA | TMP | | | | | | | | | 55th | 79 | |
| 2011 | Peter Clark | 96 | Chevy | TMP | STA | STA | MND | TMP | NHA | **RIV**; 23 | STA | NHA | BRI | DEL | TMP | LRP | NHA | STA | TMP | | | | | | | 50th | 99 | |
| 2012 | Peter Clark | 96 | Chevy | TMP | STA | MND | STA | WFD | NHA | STA | TMP | BRI | TMP | RIV; 4 | NHA | STA | TMP | | | | | | | | | 38th | 40 | |
| 2013 | Peter Clark | 96 | Chevy | TMP | STA | STA | WFD | RIV | NHA | MND | STA | TMP | BRI | RIV; 5 | NHA | STA | TMP | | | | | | | | | 39th | 39 | |
