= Tony Ferrante Jr. =

American racing driver

- Nationality: American
- Born: February 13, 1964 (age 62) Franklin Square, NY, U.S.

NASCAR Whelen Modified Tour career
- Debut season: 1985
- Years active: 1985–2012
- Starts: 317
- Championships: 0
- Wins: 0
- Poles: 2
- Best finish: 9th in 1999
- Statistics up to date as of September 17, 2024.

Tony Ferrante Jr. (born February 13, 1964) is an American former professional stock car racing driver who competed in the NASCAR Whelen Modified Tour from 1985 to 2012.

Ferrante also competed in the Race of Champions Asphalt Modified Tour.

== Motorsports results ==
=== NASCAR ===
(key) (Bold – Pole position awarded by qualifying time. Italics – Pole position earned by points standings or practice time. * – Most laps led.)

==== Whelen Modified Tour ====
NASCAR Whelen Modified Tour results
Year	Team	No.	Make	1	2	3	4	5	6	7	8	9	10	11	12	13	14	15	16	17	18	19	20	21	22	23	24	25	26	27	28	29	NWMTC	Pts	Ref
1985	N/A	21	N/A	TMP	MAR	STA	MAR	NEG	WFD	NEG	SPE	RIV; 23	CLA	STA	TMP	NEG	HOL	HOL	RIV	CAT	EPP	TMP	WFD	RIV	STA	TMP	POC	TIO	OXF				N/A	0	
1985	N/A	x2	N/A																											STA; 17	TMP	MAR	N/A	0	
1986	N/A	31	N/A	ROU	MAR	STA	TMP	MAR	NEG	MND	EPP	NEG	WFD	SPE	RIV; 22	NEG	TMP	RIV	TMP	RIV	STA	TMP	POC; 48	TIO	OXF	STA	TMP	MAR					N/A	0	
1987	N/A	X3	N/A	ROU	MAR	TMP	STA	CNB	STA	MND	WFD	JEN	SPE	RIV	TMP	RPS	EPP	RIV; 14	STA	TMP	RIV	SEE	STA	POC	TIO	TMP	OXF	TMP	ROU	MAR	STA		N/A	0	
1988	N/A	43	N/A	ROU	MAR	TMP	MAR	JEN	IRP	MND	OSW	OSW; DNQ	RIV; DNQ	JEN; 18	RPS	TMP					OSW; 33	TMP	POC	TIO	TMP	ROU	MAR						N/A	0	
1988	N/A	3	N/A														RIV; 11	OSW	TMP	OXF													N/A	0	
1989	Anthony Ferrante	03	Chevy	MAR	TMP; 27	MAR	JEN; 15	STA	IRP	OSW; 28	WFD	MND	RIV; 24	OSW; 21																			28th	829	
1989	Anthony Ferrante	3	Chevy												JEN; 16	STA	RPS	RIV	OSW	TMP	TMP	RPS	OSW	TMP	POC	STA	TIO	MAR	TMP				28th	829	
1990	Anthony Ferrante	31	Chevy	MAR	TMP; 13	RCH	STA; 12	MAR; 15	STA; 20	TMP; 11	MND; DNQ	HOL; 15	STA; 13	RIV; 21	JEN; 11	EPP; 9	RPS; DNQ	RIV; 14	TMP; 13	RPS; 15	NHA; 16	TMP; 26	POC; 29	STA; 12	TMP; 7	MAR; 28							15th	2428	
1991	Anthony Ferrante	31	Chevy	MAR; 8	RCH; 31	TMP; 16	NHA; 21	MAR; 25	NZH; 18	STA; 8	TMP; 11	FLE; 27	OXF; 12	RIV; 9	JEN; 5	STA; 20	RPS; 15	RIV; 20	RCH; 14	TMP; 32	NHA; 14	TMP; 9	POC; 12	STA; 18	TMP; 8	MAR; 16							12th	2662	
1992	Anthony Ferrante	31	Chevy	MAR; 28	TMP; 12	RCH; 11	STA; 17	MAR; 8	NHA; 12	NZH; 18	STA; 25	TMP; 9	FLE; 16	RIV; 11	NHA; 10	STA; 11	RPS; 19	RIV; 9	TMP; 10	TMP; 20	NHA; 14	STA; 16	MAR; 17	TMP; 23									12th	2484	
1993	Anthony Ferrante	31	Chevy	RCH; 29	STA; 28	TMP; 19	NHA; 13	NZH; 33	STA; 23	RIV; 7	NHA; 31	RPS	HOL; 13	LEE; 23	RIV; 7	STA; 12	TMP; 11	TMP; 24	STA; 27	TMP; 7													19th	1799	
1994	Anthony Ferrante	31	Chevy	NHA; 14	STA; 21	TMP; 7	NZH; 9	STA; 7	LEE; 5	TMP; 27	RIV; 16	TIO; 23	NHA; 24	RPS; 14	HOL; 10	TMP; 7	RIV; 12	NHA; 18	STA; 11	SPE; 13	TMP; 7	NHA; 16	STA; 6	TMP; 26									10th	2575	
1995	Anthony Ferrante	31	Chevy	TMP; 17	NHA; 38	STA; 11	NZH; 10	STA; 17	LEE; 22	TMP; 20	RIV; 20	BEE; 9	NHA; 13	JEN; 10	RPS; 24	HOL; 24	RIV; 14	NHA; 16	STA; 21	TMP; 30	NHA; 21	STA; 12	TMP; 31	TMP; 11									18th	2254	
1996	Anthony Ferrante	31	Chevy	TMP; 10	STA; 10	NZH; 6	STA; 12	NHA; 11	JEN; 19	RIV; 22	LEE; 27	RPS; 12	HOL; 7	TMP; 9	RIV; 16	NHA; 11	GLN; 9	STA; 13	NHA; 19	NHA; 31	STA; 19	FLE; 19	TMP; 15										10th	2387	
1997	Anthony Ferrante	31	Chevy	TMP; 24	MAR; 12	STA; 20	NZH; 12	STA; 8	NHA; 25	FLE; 12	JEN; 2	RIV; 8	GLN; 13	NHA; 19	RPS; 12	HOL; 9	TMP; 15	RIV; 17	NHA; 3	GLN; 13	STA; 16	NHA; 34	STA; 7	FLE; 17	TMP; 25	RCH; 12							12th	2780	
1998	Anthony Ferrante	31	Chevy	RPS; 17	TMP; 3	MAR; 9	STA; 3	NZH; 11	STA; 30	GLN; 5	JEN; 19	RIV; 7	NHA; 17	NHA; 23	LEE; 11	HOL	TMP; 4	NHA; 9	RIV; 5	STA; 20	NHA; 13	TMP; 31	STA; 27	TMP; 19	FLE; 14								11th	2585	
1999	Anthony Ferrante	31	Chevy	TMP; 11	RPS; 6	STA; 22	RCH; 16	STA; 16	RIV; 5	JEN; 25	NHA; 9	NZH; 9	HOL; 15	TMP; 9	NHA; 8	RIV; 8	GLN; 9	STA; 7	RPS; 12	TMP; 6	NHA; 12	STA; 27	MAR; 10	TMP; 17									9th	2682	
2000	Anthony Ferrante	31	Chevy	STA; 20	RCH; 28	STA; DNQ	RIV	SEE; 13	NHA; 37	NZH; 39	TMP; 9	RIV; 14	GLN	TMP; 22	STA; DNQ	WFD; DNQ	NHA; 32	STA; DNQ	MAR	TMP; 20													26th	1181	
2001	Anthony Ferrante	31	Chevy	SBO; 29	TMP; 7	STA; 14	WFD; 26	NZH; 22	STA; 20	RIV; 13	SEE; 20	RCH; 23	NHA; 19	HOL; 22	RIV; 11	CHE; 19	TMP; 15	STA; 30	WFD; 27	TMP; 17	STA; 17	MAR; 22	TMP; 29										17th	2058	
2002	Anthony Ferrante	31	Chevy	TMP; 9	STA; 14	WFD; 10	NZH; 21	RIV; 24	SEE; 14	RCH; 28	STA; 16	BEE	NHA; 17	RIV; DNQ	TMP; 21	STA; 13	WFD	TMP; 2	NHA; 27	STA; 28	MAR	TMP; 20											20th	1742	
2003	Anthony Ferrante	31	Chevy	TMP; 6	STA; 10	WFD; 16	NZH; 31	STA; 15	LER	BLL; 18	BEE	NHA	ADI	RIV; 17	TMP; 9	STA; 9	WFD	TMP; 26	NHA	STA; 13	TMP; 16												25th	1408	
2004	Anthony Ferrante	31	Chevy	TMP; 6	STA; 8	WFD; 8	NZH; 11	STA; 19	RIV; 11	LER	WAL; 4	BEE	NHA	SEE	**RIV**; 5	STA; DNQ	TMP; 23	WFD	TMP; 28		STA; 30	TMP; DNQ											24th	1532	
2004	Hill Enterprises	97	Pontiac																	NHA; 25													24th	1532	
2005	Anthony Ferrante	31	Chevy	TMP; 35	STA; 13	RIV; 11	WFD	STA; 12	JEN	NHA	BEE	SEE	RIV; 28	STA	TMP; 11	WFD	MAR	TMP; 7	NHA	STA; 11	TMP; 7												29th	1070	
2006	Anthony Ferrante	31	Chevy	TMP	STA	JEN	TMP; 34	STA	NHA	HOL	RIV; 12	STA	TMP	MAR	TMP; 5	NHA	WFD	TMP; 25	STA														43rd	431	
2007	Anthony Ferrante	31	Chevy	TMP; 6	STA	WTO; DNQ	STA	TMP	NHA	TSA	RIV; 25	STA	TMP	MAN	MAR	NHA	TMP; 9	STA	**TMP**; 12														38th	561	
2008	Anthony Ferrante	31	Chevy	TMP; 30	STA	STA	TMP; 5	NHA	SPE	RIV; 11	STA	TMP	MAN	TMP; 16	NHA	MAR	CHE	STA	TMP; 9														39th	611	
2009	Anthony Ferrante	31	Chevy	TMP; 15	STA	STA	NHA	SPE	RIV	STA	BRI	TMP; 24	NHA	MAR	STA	TMP																	42nd	209	
2010	Anthony Ferrante	31	Chevy	TMP	STA	STA	MAR	NHA	LIM	MND	RIV; 19	STA	TMP	BRI	NHA	STA	TMP; DNQ																42nd	167	
2011	Anthony Ferrante	31	Chevy	TMP; 31	STA	STA	MND	TMP	NHA	RIV	STA	NHA	BRI	DEL	TMP	LRP	NHA	STA	TMP; 34														43rd	131	
2012	Anthony Ferrante	31	Chevy	TMP; 26	STA	MND	STA	WFD	NHA	STA	TMP	BRI	TMP	RIV	NHA	STA	TMP																49th	18	
