= 2010 NASCAR Whelen Modified Tour =

The 2010 NASCAR Whelen Modified Tour was the 26th season of the Whelen Modified Tour (WMT). It began with the Icebreaker 150 at Thompson Speedway Motorsports Park on April 11. It ended with the Sunoco World Series of Speedway Racing at Thompson again on October 17. Donny Lia entered the season as the defending Drivers' Champion. Bobby Santos III won the 2010 championship after 14 races, 27 points ahead of Mike Stefanik.

== Schedule ==
No.	Race title	Track	Date
1	Icebreaker 150	Thompson Speedway Motorsports Park, Thompson, Connecticut	April 11
2	Spring Sizzler Presented by CarQuest	Stafford Motor Speedway, Stafford, Connecticut	May 1
3	TSI Harley-Davidson 125	Stafford Motor Speedway, Stafford, Connecticut	May 28
4	Made In America Whelen 200	Martinsville Speedway, Martinsville, Virginia	June 6
5	New England 100	New Hampshire Motor Speedway, Loudon, New Hampshire	June 26
6	Lime Rock 100	Lime Rock Park, Lakeville, Connecticut	July 3
7	Monadnock 200	Monadnock Speedway, Winchester, New Hampshire	July 17
8	Riverhead 200	Riverhead Raceway, Riverhead, New York	July 31
9	Town Fair Tire 150	Stafford Motor Speedway, Stafford, Connecticut	August 6
10	Budweiser King of Beers 150	Thompson Speedway Motorsports Park, Thompson, Connecticut	August 12
11	UNOH Perfect Storm (Note: The UNOH Perfect Storm was held as a combined event, with competitors from the Whelen Modified Tour competing along with competitors for the Whelen Southern Modified Tour. The race was run with a series-based point distribution, where drivers received points and statistical credit for their finish relative to other drivers in their series, not to the whole field in general.)	Bristol Motor Speedway, Bristol, Tennessee	August 18
12	F.W. Webb 100	New Hampshire Motor Speedway, Loudon, New Hampshire	September 18
13	CarQuest Fall Final	Stafford Motor Speedway, Stafford, Connecticut	October 3
14	Sunoco World Series of Speedway Racing	Thompson Speedway Motorsports Park, Thompson, Connecticut	October 17

== Results and standings ==
=== Races ===
No.	Race	Pole position	Most laps led	Winning driver	Manufacturer
1	Icebreaker 150	Bobby Santos III	Bobby Santos III	Bobby Santos III	Dodge
2	Spring Sizzler Presented by CarQuest	Bobby Santos III	Doug Coby	Ted Christopher	Chevrolet
3	TSI Harley-Davidson 125	Bobby Santos III	Eric Berndt	Bobby Santos III	Dodge
4	Made In America Whelen 200	Mike Stefanik	Ryan Preece	Bobby Santos III	Dodge
5	New England 100	Ryan Newman	Ted Christopher	Ryan Newman	Chevrolet
6	Lime Rock 100	Todd Szegedy	Todd Szegedy	Dale Quarterley	Chevrolet
7	Monadnock 200	Erick Rudolph	Erick Rudolph	Ted Christopher	Chevrolet
8	Riverhead 200	George Brunnhoelzl III	George Brunnhoelzl III; Kevin Goodale (Note: Brunnhoelzl III and Goodale both led 54 laps.)	Rowan Pennink	Chevrolet
9	Town Fair Tire 150	Ron Silk	Todd Szegedy	Todd Szegedy	Ford
10	Budweiser King of Beers 150	Ted Christopher	Ted Christopher	Ted Christopher	Chevrolet
11	UNOH Perfect Storm	Justin Bonsignore	Ted Christopher	Ryan Newman	Chevrolet
12	F.W. Webb 100	Ryan Newman	Ryan Newman	Ryan Newman	Chevrolet
13	CarQuest Fall Final	Justin Bonsignore	Ron Silk	Bobby Santos III	Dodge
14	Sunoco World Series of Speedway Racing	Bobby Santos III	Ron Silk	Ted Christopher	Chevrolet

=== Drivers' championship ===
(key) Bold - Pole position awarded by time. Italics - Pole position set by final practice results or rainout. * – Most laps led.

Pos	Driver	THO	STA	STA	MAR	NHA	LMP	MON	RIV	STA	THO	BRI	NHA	STA	THO	Points
1	Bobby Santos III	**1***	**2**	**1**	1	4	17	5	9	23	3	4	19	1	**6**	2180
2	Mike Stefanik	3	3	7	**4**	27	6	11	4	2	5	2	3	5	4	2153
3	Ted Christopher	4	1	12	18	2*	5	1	12	5	**1***	26*	30	8	1	2102
4	Ron Silk	8	30	13	15	5	3	3	3	**3**	2	15	5	2*	5*	2096
5	Todd Szegedy	5	5	3	3	15	**2***	25	22	1*	6	5	24	11	20	1957
6	Ryan Preece	2	23	4	16*	3	4	22	2	16	22	9	20	6	2	1933
7	Eric Goodale	9	17	24	24	11	18	14	7	7	9	8	8	12	8	1784
8	Erick Rudolph	19	9	8	27	28	16	**2***	10	4	21	10	25	3	19	1753
9	Eric Beers	10	27	28	7	10	25	10	6	6	11	14	18	9	7	1752
10	Chuck Hossfeld	33	6	15	25	13	7	17	21	9	7	12	7	18	13	1704
11	Rowan Pennink	6	4	26	32	25	22	12	1	29	4	33	35	4	9	1648
12	Richie Pallai Jr.	21	12	16	9	14	23	23	23	11	14	31	10	23	11	1592
13	Justin Bonsignore	27	10	11	2	12	21	9	17	25	24	**6**	27	**29**	22	1587
14	Ed Flemke Jr.	26	11	29	23	6	8	21	18	12	16	20	26	24	15	1540
15	Wade Cole	22	21	20	10	19	10	19	14	24	18	22	14	15	27	1534
16	Woody Pitkat	12	24	23	8	9	11	13	16	21	25	13	22	30	30	1527
17	George Brunnhoelzl III	16	29	9	29	29		6	**5***	10	17	28	13	13	26	1478
18	Renee Dupuis	13	18	18	26	20	13	18	25	13	20	35	23	14	24	1478
19	Jamie Tomaino	34	28	14	33	18	9	20	8	28	13	21	32	28	17	1398
20	James Civali	29	8	27	6	7		7	24		12	3^{1}	17		10	1206
21	Gary McDonald	25	DNQ	DNQ	34	21	19	16	DNQ	20	19		15	25	25	1162
22	Glenn Tyler	20	13	21	36	16	14		20	22			11	16	29	1139
23	Jimmy Blewett	15	15	2	30	30				26	15		2	20	31	1103
24	Jake Marosz	32	DNQ	31	14	32	15	26	DNQ	30	23		16	31	28	1084
25	Kevin Goodale	31	14	25	17		24		15*		28	16	29	22	DNQ	1047
26	Glen Reen		25	17		34		8		15	10		21	7	16	1016
27	Doug Coby	37	22*			8	20			17	8		4		3	1003
28	Eric Berndt	11	7	6*				4		27	29			21	12	986
29	Danny Knoll	24	DNQ	DNQ	13	22	12	15	13	18						918
30	Ken Heagy	35	31			17			DNQ	14	26		12	10	18	889
31	Johnny Bush	23	20	19	19	26		24	DNQ		27					743
32	Rob Summers	28	32	5		31						27	33	27	32	690
33	Dale Quarterley						1					7	6	17		597
34	Ryan Newman					**1**						1	**1***			560
35	Joe Hartmann	18	19			33							9	26	DNQ	554
36	Andy Seuss	36	26	10	20	23						23^{1}	34			532
37	Chris Pasteryak	7	16	30	22											431
38	Burt Myers	14			5							11^{1}			14	397
39	Richard Savary	30				36							28		23	301
40	Rob Fuller	17			31	35										240
41	L. W. Miller				21	24						29^{1}				191
42	Tony Ferrante Jr.								19						DNQ^{2}	167
43	Tom Rogers Jr.													19	DNQ^{2}	164
44	Bobby Grigas III									8						142
45	Jason Myers				11							18^{1}				130
46	Dave Brigati								11							130
47	Frank Fleming				12							17^{1}				127
48	Mike Christopher					DNQ^{2}							31			122
49	Mike Speeney									19						106
50	Ron Yuhas Jr.														21	100
51	Tim Arre			22												97
52	Chuck Steuer								26							85
53	Frank Vigliarolo Jr.								27							82
54	Bryan Dauzat				28							24^{1}				79
55	Howie Brode								28							79
56	Kenny Horton		33													64
57	Jonathan Kievman				35											58
58	Rick Gentes														DNQ^{2}	55
59	Zach Brewer				37							32^{1}				52
	Andy Petree											DNQ				
	Gary Fountain Sr.											DNQ				
Drivers ineligible for NWMT points, because at the combined event at Bristol they chose to drive for NWSMT points
	John Smith											19				
	Gene Pack											25				
	Tim Brown											30				
	Greg Butcher											34				
	Brandon Hire											36				
Pos	Driver	THO	STA	STA	MAR	NHA	LMP	MON	RIV	STA	THO	BRI	NHA	STA	THO	Points

Notes

- ^{1} – Scored points towards the Whelen Southern Modified Tour.
- ^{2} – Tony Ferrante Jr., Tom Rogers Jr., Mike Christopher and Rick Gentes received championship points, despite the fact that the driver did not qualify for the race.

== See also ==
- 2010 NASCAR Sprint Cup Series
- 2010 NASCAR Nationwide Series
- 2010 NASCAR Camping World Truck Series
- 2010 ARCA Racing Series
- 2010 NASCAR Whelen Southern Modified Tour
- 2010 NASCAR Canadian Tire Series
- 2010 NASCAR Mini Stock Series
- 2010 NASCAR Corona Series
