= Bobby Santos III =

American racing driver (born 1985)

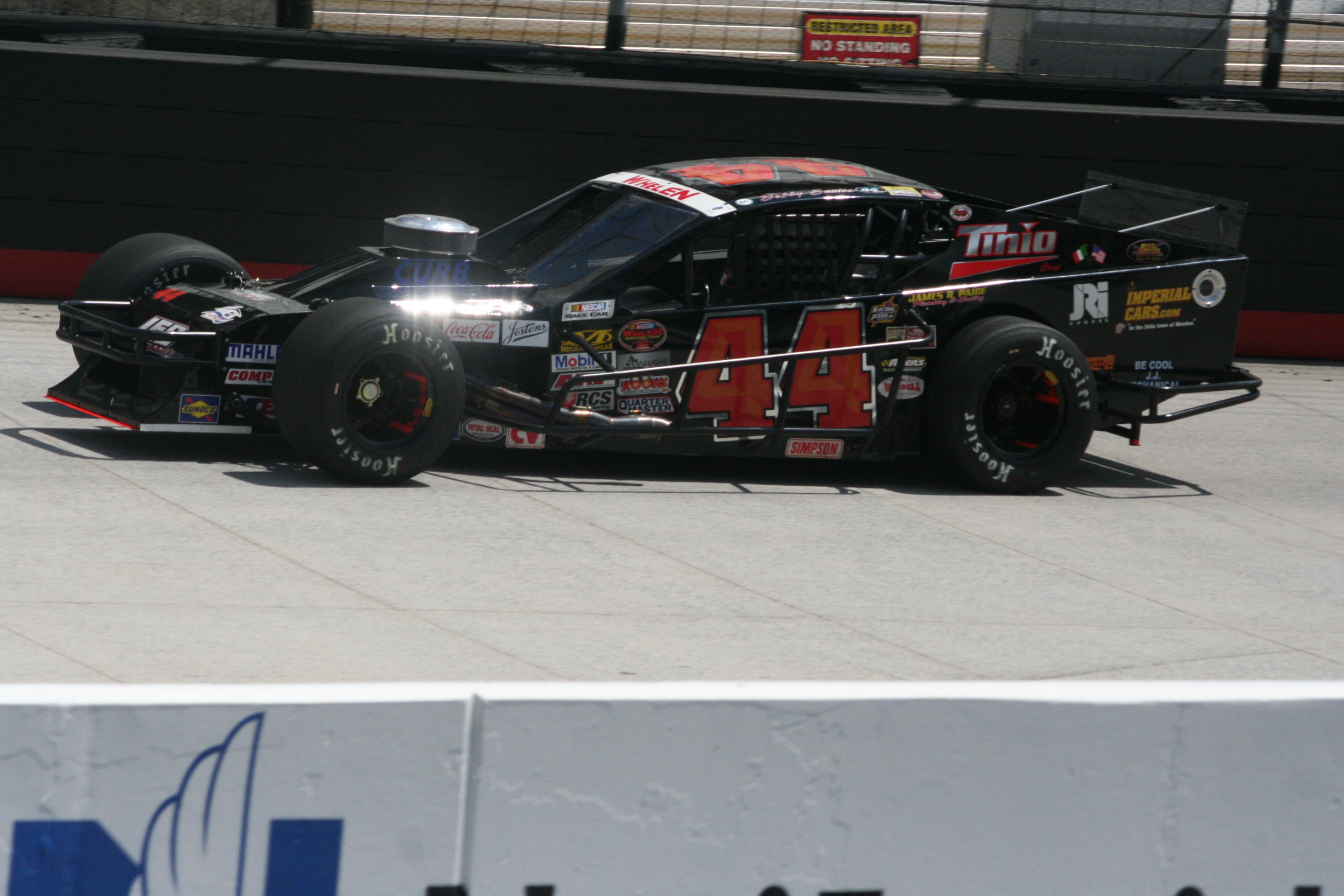
- Santos III's No. 44 car at Bristol Motor Speedway in 2016
- Born: Robert Santos III; October 3, 1985 (age 41); Franklin, Massachusetts, U.S.
- Achievements: 2006 Night Before the 500 winner 2008 Turkey Night Grand Prix winner 2010 NASCAR Whelen Modified Tour champion 2020 Little 500 winner

NASCAR O'Reilly Auto Parts Series career
- 6 races run over 3 years
- 2012 position: 92nd
- Best finish: 70th (2011)
- First race: 2007 Circuit City 250 (Richmond)
- Last race: 2012 Subway Jalapeño 250 (Daytona)
| Wins | Top tens | Poles |
|---|---|---|
| 0 | 0 | 0 |

NASCAR FedEx Freight Truck Series career
- 1 race run over 1 year
- 2011 position: 110th
- Best finish: 110th (2011)
- First race: 2011 F.W. Webb 175 (Loudon)
| Wins | Top tens | Poles |
|---|---|---|
| 0 | 0 | 0 |
- Statistics up to date as of February 25, 2013.

Robert Santos III (born October 3, 1985) is an American professional racing driver from Franklin, Massachusetts. He graduated in 2004 from Tri-County Regional Vocational Technical High School. Santos, nicknamed "Bobby New England", is the grandson of Bobby Santos, a former modified racer. His sister, Erica Pitkat, and brother in law Woody Pitkat are also racecar drivers. He is the cousin of former University of New Hampshire quarterback, and current head coach Ricky Santos.

== Early career ==
Before stock cars, Santos was a successful midget racer. He raced in the Northeastern Midget Association, USAC, PRA Big Car, and ISMA. He had the most wins of any driver in the USAC National Midget Tour in 2006, collecting five wins, including a win at O'Reilly Raceway Park on the Night Before the 500. He was signed to Bill Davis Racing.

== ARCA career ==
In 2006, Santos made his stock car debut at Iowa Speedway for Bill Davis Racing in the No. 02 Dodge. He started tenth and finished sixth. He returned to ARCA in 2007 for Bill Davis, now in a Toyota Camry. He won Toyota's first stock car pole at USA International Speedway in Lakeland, Florida. While leading the race, he was involved in an incident with a lapped car and did not finish. He returned at Nashville Superspeedway, but had a mid-pack run. At Kansas Speedway, Santos started second, but a blown engine relegated him to another DNF. Santos broke his dry spell at Kentucky Speedway when he started fourth and finished third, behind Erik Darnell and Erin Crocker. Santos placed third in the next race at Kentucky, as well. He won a pole at Pocono Raceway in early August and qualified fifth at Talladega Superspeedway, but was unable to back up either with a strong finish.

== NASCAR career ==
In 2007, Santos made his NASCAR Busch Series debut at Richmond International Raceway for the new Riley D'Hondt Motorsports team. He qualified seventh in his No. 91 Toyota but faded back to a thirtieth-place finish after running in the top-ten at the beginning of the race. He also qualified fourth for the Camping World 200 at New Hampshire Motor Speedway and was running in the top-ten before being hit by a lapped car. He ran two additional races for RDHM but did not finish better than 30th.

Santos has also participated in the Whelen Modified Tour, collecting his first two wins at Thompson International Speedway in October 2007, and the Ice Breaker, also at Thompson International Speedway, in April 2010. He parlayed his season-opening Icebreaker win into the 2010 Whelen Modified Tour championship, collecting a total of four wins and four poles on the season.

Santos ran the 2011 Nationwide Series opener for Jimmy Means in what was a back-up JR Motorsports car after wrecking the No. 52 in practice; the Earnhardt family has a long friendship with the independent owner and former driver. Santos finished seventeenth after vowing to run the race in its entirety.

== Current career ==
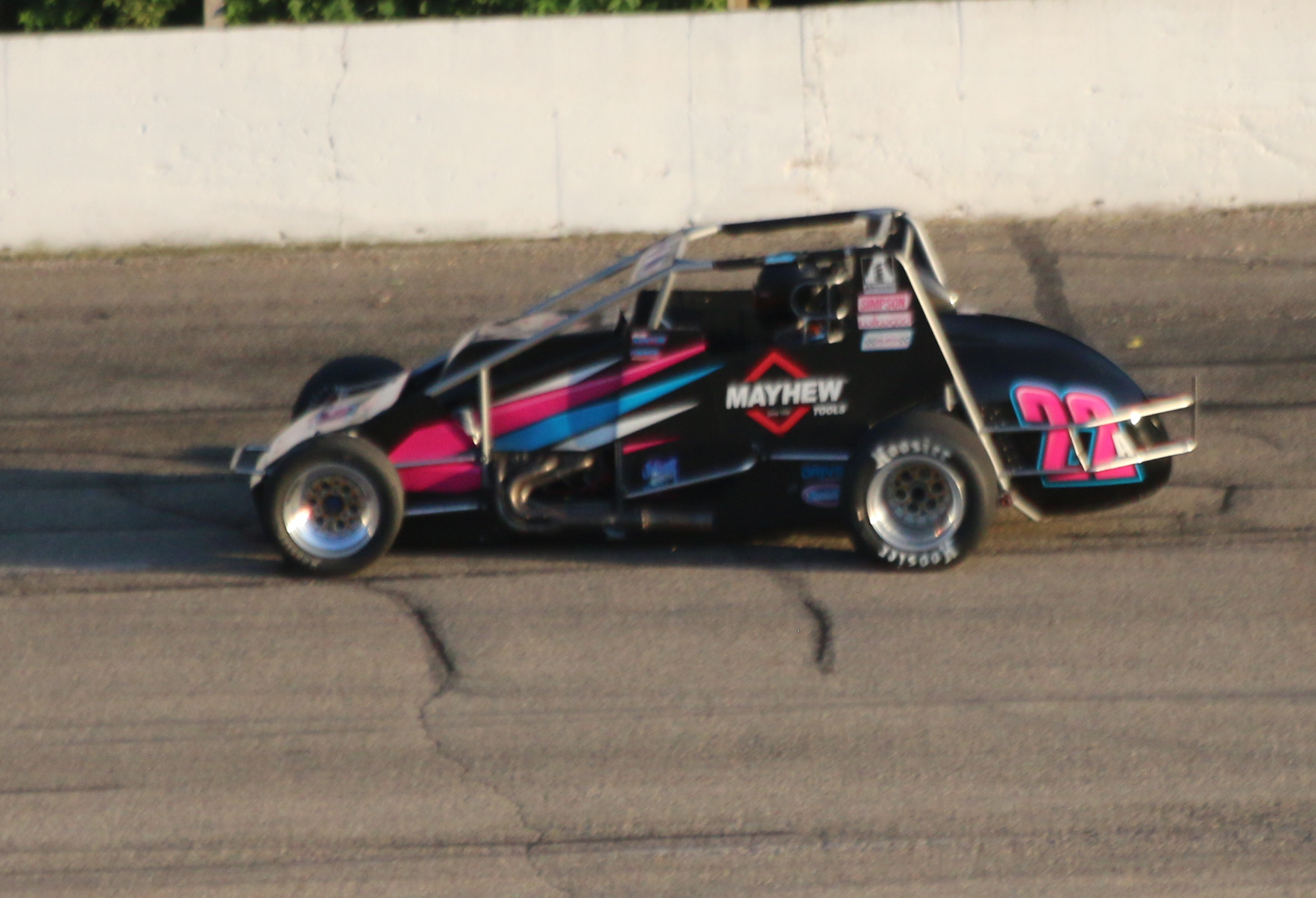
Santos' 2018 USAC Silvercrown car at Madison

After his stint in stock car racing, Santos returned to his roots, racing the full NASCAR Whelen Modified Tour for Bob Garbarino's Mystic Missile Racing team and a limited schedule in all three USAC divisions. Santos also made select appearances in the NEMA ranks in 2009. Santos' post-NASCAR career has been highlighted by wins in many of the nation's largest midget races, including the Turkey Night Grand Prix and Copper World Classic. He also won the 2020 Little 500 USAC Sprint car race at Anderson Speedway.

Santos would drive part-time in the NASCAR Nationwide Series in 2012 for Tommy Baldwin Racing and would continue to compete on the NASCAR Whelen Modified Tour behind the wheel of the Tinio Corporation No. 44.

Santos registered back-to-back Musket 250 wins in 2019 and 2020.

== Motorsports career results ==
=== NASCAR ===
(key) (Bold – Pole position awarded by qualifying time. Italics – Pole position earned by points standings or practice time. * – Most laps led.)

==== Nationwide Series ====
NASCAR Nationwide Series results
| Year | Team | No. | Make | 1 | 2 | 3 | 4 | 5 | 6 | 7 | 8 | 9 | 10 | 11 | 12 | 13 | 14 | 15 | 16 | 17 | 18 | 19 | 20 | 21 | 22 | 23 | 24 | 25 | 26 | 27 | 28 | 29 | 30 | 31 | 32 | 33 | 34 | 35 | NNSC | Pts | Ref |
|---|---|---|---|---|---|---|---|---|---|---|---|---|---|---|---|---|---|---|---|---|---|---|---|---|---|---|---|---|---|---|---|---|---|---|---|---|---|---|---|---|---|
| 2007 | Riley-D'Hondt Motorsports | 91 | Toyota | DAY | CAL | MXC | LVS | ATL | BRI | NSH | TEX | PHO | TAL | RCH; 30 | DAR | CLT | DOV | | | | NHA; 33 | DAY | CHI | GTY | IRP | CGV | GLN | MCH | BRI | CAL | RCH | DOV | KAN | | | | | | 98th | 235 | |
| 2007 | Riley-D'Hondt Motorsports | 92 | Toyota | | | | | | | | | | | | | | | NSH; 37 | KEN | MLW | | | | | | | | | | | | | | CLT; 39 | MEM | TEX | PHO | HOM | 98th | 235 | |
| 2010 | MacDonald Motorsports | 81 | Dodge | DAY | CAL | LVS | BRI | NSH | PHO | TEX | TAL | RCH | DAR | DOV | CLT | NSH | KEN | ROA | NHA | DAY | CHI | GTY | IRP | IOW | GLN | MCH | BRI | CGV | ATL | RCH | DOV | KAN | CAL | CLT | GTY; QL^{†} | TEX | PHO | HOM | NA | - | |
| 2011 | Jimmy Means Racing | 52 | Chevy | DAY; 17 | PHO | LVS | BRI | CAL | TEX | TAL | NSH | RCH | DAR | DOV | IOW | CLT | CHI | MCH | ROA | DAY | KEN | NHA | NSH | IRP | IOW | GLN | CGV | BRI | ATL | RCH | CHI | DOV | KAN | CLT | TEX | PHO | HOM | | 70th | 27 | |
| 2012 | Tommy Baldwin Racing | 36 | Chevy | DAY | PHO | LVS | BRI | CAL | TEX | RCH | TAL | DAR | IOW | CLT | DOV | MCH | ROA | KEN | DAY; 33 | NHA | CHI | IND | IOW | GLN | CGV | BRI | ATL | RCH | CHI | KEN | DOV | CLT | KAN | TEX | PHO | HOM | | | 91st | 11 | |
^{†} - Qualified for Michael McDowell

==== Camping World Truck Series ====
NASCAR Camping World Truck Series results
| Year | Team | No. | Make | 1 | 2 | 3 | 4 | 5 | 6 | 7 | 8 | 9 | 10 | 11 | 12 | 13 | 14 | 15 | 16 | 17 | 18 | 19 | 20 | 21 | 22 | 23 | 24 | 25 | NCWTC | Pts | Ref |
|---|---|---|---|---|---|---|---|---|---|---|---|---|---|---|---|---|---|---|---|---|---|---|---|---|---|---|---|---|---|---|---|
| 2011 | Norm Benning Racing | 75 | Chevy | DAY | PHO | DAR | MAR | NSH | DOV | CLT | KAN | TEX | KEN | IOW | NSH | IRP | POC | MCH | BRI | ATL | CHI | NHA; 34 | KEN | LVS | TAL | MAR | TEX | HOM | 110th | 0^{1} | |

^{1} Ineligible for series points

==== Whelen Modified Tour ====
NASCAR Whelen Modified Tour results
| Year | Car owner | No. | Make | 1 | 2 | 3 | 4 | 5 | 6 | 7 | 8 | 9 | 10 | 11 | 12 | 13 | 14 | 15 | 16 | 17 | 18 | 19 | 20 | NWMTC | Pts | Ref |
|---|---|---|---|---|---|---|---|---|---|---|---|---|---|---|---|---|---|---|---|---|---|---|---|---|---|---|
| 2001 | Info not available | | | SBO | TMP | STA | WFD | NZH | STA | RIV | SEE | RCH | NHA | HOL | RIV | CHE | TMP | STA | WFD | TMP | STA; DNQ | MAR; DNQ | | N/A | 0 | |
| 2001 | Info not available | 97 | | | | | | | | | | | | | | | | | | | | | TMP; DNQ | N/A | 0 | |
| 2004 | Joe Brady | 00 | Chevy | TMP; 30 | STA; 32 | WFD; 22 | NZH | STA | RIV | LER | BLL | BEE; 28 | NHA | SEE; 9 | RIV | STA; 14 | TMP; 28 | WFD | TMP | NHA | STA | | | 37th | 804 | |
| 2004 | Joe Brady | 34 | Chevy | | | | | | | | | | | | | | | | | | | TMP; 6 | | 37th | 804 | |
| 2005 | Info not available | 14 | | TMP | STA | RIV | WFD | STA | JEN | NHA | BEE | SEE | RIV | STA | TMP | WFD | MAR | TMP | NHA | STA; DNQ | TMP | | | N/A | 0 | |
| 2006 | Jeffrey Preece | 40 | Chevy | TMP | STA | JEN | TMP | STA | NHA; 29 | HOL | RIV | STA | TMP | MAR | TMP | NHA | WFD | TMP | STA | | | | | 66th | 76 | |
| 2007 | Jan Boehler | 3 | Chevy | TMP; 32 | STA; 32 | WTO | STA | TMP; 3 | NHA; 7 | TSA | RIV | STA; 32 | TMP; 35 | MAN | MAR; 20 | NHA; 4 | TMP; 4 | STA; 9 | TMP; 1* | | | | | 25th | 1311 | |
| 2008 | Joe Brady | 00 | Chevy | TMP; 35 | STA | STA | | | | | | | | | | | | | | | | | | 31st | 781 | |
| 2008 | Bobby Santos | 98 | Chevy | | | | TMP; 8 | NHA; 6 | SPE | RIV | STA | TMP; 3 | MAN | TMP; 6 | NHA; 38 | MAR | CHE | STA | TMP; 32 | | | | | 31st | 781 | |
| 2009 | Bobby Santos | 96 | Chevy | TMP | STA | STA | NHA | SPE | RIV | STA | BRI | TMP | NHA; 37 | MAR | STA | TMP; 27 | | | | | | | | 50th | 134 | |
| 2010 | Robert Garbarino | 4 | Dodge | **TMP**; 1* | **STA**; 2 | STA; 1 | MAR; 1 | NHA; 4 | LIM; 17 | MND; 5 | RIV; 9 | STA; 23 | TMP; 3 | BRI; 3 | NHA; 19 | STA; 1 | **TMP**; 6 | | | | | | | 1st | 2180 | |
| 2011 | Robert Garbarino | 4 | Dodge | **TMP**; 33 | STA; 1* | STA; 3 | MND; 15 | TMP; 4 | NHA; 12 | RIV; 9 | STA; 3 | **NHA**; 6* | **BRI**; 18 | DEL; 11 | TMP; 13 | LRP; 17 | NHA; 18 | STA; 27 | TMP; 2 | | | | | 8th | 2133 | |
| 2012 | Sully Tinio | 44 | Chevy | TMP; 17 | STA | MND | **STA**; 2* | WFD | NHA; 11 | STA; 27 | TMP; 8 | BRI | TMP; 2 | RIV | NHA; 28 | STA; 1 | TMP; 1 | | | | | | | 20th | 310 | |
| 2013 | Sully Tinio | 44 | Chevy | TMP; 18 | | | | | | | | | | | | | | | | | | | | 13th | 421 | |
| 2013 | Mike Curb | 44 | Chevy | | **STA**; 1* | **STA**; 5 | WFD; 5 | RIV | NHA; 24 | MND | **STA**; 4 | **TMP**; 1* | BRI; 21 | RIV; 25 | NHA; 4 | STA; 9 | **TMP**; 4* | | | | | | | 13th | 421 | |
| 2014 | Mike Curb | 44 | Chevy | TMP; 18 | STA; 1* | **STA**; 3 | WFD; 1 | RIV; 10 | NHA; 1 | MND; 11 | STA; 12 | TMP; 25 | BRI; 2* | NHA; 8 | **STA**; 12 | TMP; 28 | | | | | | | | 6th | 458 | |
| 2015 | Mike Curb | 44 | Chevy | TMP; 3 | STA; 11 | WFD; 6 | STA; 5 | TMP; 6 | RIV; 20 | NHA; 3 | MND; 22 | STA; 9 | TMP; 23 | BRI; 5 | RIV | NHA; 3 | STA; 20 | TMP; 16 | | | | | | 11th | 467 | |
| 2016 | Mike Curb | 44 | Chevy | TMP; 13 | STA; 7 | WFD; 26 | STA; 8 | TMP; 1 | RIV; 12 | NHA; 27 | MND; 20 | STA; 17 | TMP; 3 | BRI; 7 | RIV; 28 | **OSW**; 13 | SEE; 5 | NHA; 26 | STA; 18 | TMP; 15 | | | | 12th | 507 | |
| 2017 | Sully Tinio | 44 | Chevy | MYR | THO; 4 | STA | LGY | THO; 3 | RIV | NHA; 1 | STA; 11 | THO; 5 | | | | | NHA; 1 | STA; 8 | THO; 29 | | | | | 16th | 334 | |
| 2017 | Mike Curb | 77 | Chevy | | | | | | | | | | BRI; 9 | SEE | OSW | RIV | | | | | | | | 16th | 334 | |
| 2018 | Sully Tinio | 44 | Chevy | MYR | THO; 9 | STA; 12 | SEE | THO; Wth | LGY | RIV | NHA; 1 | STA; 22 | THO; 5 | BRI | OSW | RIV | NHA; 22 | STA; 23 | THO; 8 | | | | | 25th | 256 | |
| 2019 | Judy Thilberg | 36 | Dodge | MYR | SBO | TMP | STA | WAL | SEE | TMP | RIV | NHA; 24 | | | | | NHA; 1 | STA; 7 | TMP; 4 | | | | | 24th | 241 | |
| 2019 | Judy Thilberg | 36 | Chevy | | | | | | | | | | STA; 8 | TMP; 23 | OSW; 5 | RIV | | | | | | | | 24th | 241 | |
| 2020 | Judy Thilberg | 63 | Chevy | JEN | WMM | WMM | JEN | MND | TMP | NHA; 1 | STA | TMP | | | | | | | | | | | | 35th | 47 | |
| 2021 | Judy Thilberg | 44 | Chevy | MAR | STA | RIV | JEN | OSW | RIV | NHA; 8 | NRP | STA | BEE | OSW; 6 | RCH; 23 | RIV | STA; 24 | | | | | | | 29th | 115 | |
| 2022 | Lawney Tinio | 44 | Chevy | NSM | RCH; 17 | RIV | LEE | JEN | MND | RIV | WAL | NHA; 13 | CLM | TMP | LGY | OSW; 8 | RIV | TMP; 10 | MAR; 4 | | | | | 26th | 168 | |
| 2023 | Lawney Tinio | 44 | Chevy | NSM | RCH | MON | RIV | LEE | SEE | RIV | WAL | NHA; 27 | LMP | THO; 6 | LGY | OSW; 3 | MON | RIV | NWS; 9 | THO; 5 | MAR; 28 | | | 26th | 186 | |
| 2024 | Joe Stearns | 14 | Chevy | NSM | RCH; 4 | | | | | | | | | | | | | | | | | | | 39th | 94 | |
| 2024 | Lawney Tinio | 44 | Chevy | | | THO; 21 | MON | RIV | SEE | NHA | MON | LMP | THO | | | | | | | | | | | 39th | 94 | |
| 2024 | Boehler Racing Enterprises | 3 | Chevy | | | | | | | | | | | OSW; 13 | RIV | MON | THO | NWS | MAR | | | | | 39th | 94 | |

=== ARCA Re/Max Series ===
(key) (Bold – Pole position awarded by qualifying time. Italics – Pole position earned by points standings or practice time. * – Most laps led.)

ARCA Re/Max Series results
| Year | Team | No. | Make | 1 | 2 | 3 | 4 | 5 | 6 | 7 | 8 | 9 | 10 | 11 | 12 | 13 | 14 | 15 | 16 | 17 | 18 | 19 | 20 | 21 | 22 | 23 | ARSC | Pts | Ref |
|---|---|---|---|---|---|---|---|---|---|---|---|---|---|---|---|---|---|---|---|---|---|---|---|---|---|---|---|---|---|
| 2006 | Bill Davis Racing | 02 | Dodge | DAY | NSH | SLM | WIN | KEN | TOL | POC | MCH | KAN | KEN | BLN | POC | GTW | NSH | MCH | ISF | MIL | TOL | DSF | CHI | SLM | TAL | IOW; 6 | 108th | 200 | |
| 2007 | Bill Davis Racing | 02 | Toyota | DAY | **USA**; 33* | NSH; 18 | SLM | KAN; 32 | WIN | KEN; 3 | TOL | IOW | POC | MCH | BLN | KEN; 3 | **POC**; 34 | NSH | ISF | MIL | GTW | DSF | CHI | SLM | | | 40th | 835 | |
| 2007 | Bill Davis Racing | 20 | Toyota | | | | | | | | | | | | | | | | | | | | | | TAL; 41 | TOL | 40th | 835 | |

=== Superstar Racing Experience ===
(key) * – Most laps led. ^{1} – Heat 1 winner. ^{2} – Heat 2 winner.

Superstar Racing Experience results
| Year | No. | 1 | 2 | 3 | 4 | 5 | 6 | SRXC | Pts |
|---|---|---|---|---|---|---|---|---|---|
| 2021 | 22 | STA | KNX | ELD | IRP; 5 | SLG | NSV | 17th | 28 |

^{*} Season still in progress

Sporting positions
| Preceded by Donny Lia | NASCAR Whelen Modified Tour Champion; 2010 | Succeeded by Ronnie Silk |
