= Richard Savary =

American racing driver

- Nationality: American
- Born: October 21, 1964 (age 62) Canton, Massachusetts, U.S.

NASCAR Whelen Modified Tour career
- Debut season: 1990
- Years active: 1990–1992, 2006–2010
- Starts: 66
- Championships: 0
- Wins: 0
- Poles: 1
- Best finish: 13th in 2007
- Statistics up to date as of August 27, 2024.

Richard Savary (born October 21, 1964) is an American professional stock car racing driver who competed in the NASCAR Whelen Modified Tour from 1990 to 2010. He is the son of George Savary, a NEAR Hall of Famer.

Savary has also previously competed in series such as the now defunct NASCAR Whelen Southern Modified Tour, the Modified Racing Series, the Tri-Track Open Modified Series, and the World Series of Asphalt Stock Car Racing.

== Motorsports results ==
=== NASCAR ===
(key) (Bold – Pole position awarded by qualifying time. Italics – Pole position earned by points standings or practice time. * – Most laps led.)

==== Whelen Modified Tour ====
NASCAR Whelen Modified Tour results
Year	Team	No.	Make	1	2	3	4	5	6	7	8	9	10	11	12	13	14	15	16	17	18	19	20	21	22	23	NWMTC	Pts	Ref
1990	Richard Savary	91	Chevy	MAR	TMP; 30	RCH	STA; DNQ	MAR	STA; 12	TMP; 17	MND	HOL	STA; 15	RIV	JEN	EPP; 24	RPS	RIV	TMP; 34	RPS	NHA	TMP; 27	POC	STA; 21	TMP; 19	MAR	37th	371	
1991	Richard Savary	91	Chevy	MAR	RCH	TMP; 30	NHA; 31	MAR	NZH	STA	TMP; 22	FLE	OXF	RIV	JEN; 15	STA	RPS	RIV	RCH; 17	TMP; 12	NHA; 34	TMP	POC	STA	TMP; 35	MAR	28th	868	
1992	N/A	9	Chevy	MAR	TMP	RCH	STA	MAR	NHA; 36	NZH	STA	TMP	FLE	RIV	NHA	STA	RPS	RIV	TMP	TMP	NHA	STA	MAR				N/A	0	
1992	N/A	9m	Eagle																					TMP; 32			N/A	0	
2006	John Lombardi Jr.	20	Chevy	TMP	STA; DNQ	JEN	TMP; 31	STA; 18	NHA; 27	HOL	RIV	STA	TMP; 15	MAR; 29	TMP	NHA	WFD	TMP; 15	STA								35th	604	
2007	John Lombardi Jr.	21	Chevy	TMP; 17	STA; 15	WTO; 30		**TMP**; 24	NHA; 11	TSA; 18	RIV; 22	STA; 22	TMP; 21	MAN; 13	MAR; 6	NHA; 32	TMP; 16										13th	1757	
2007	John Lombardi Jr.	20	Chevy				STA; 9											STA; 17	TMP; 13								13th	1757	
2008	Art Barry	21	Chevy	TMP; 26	STA; 7	STA; 23	TMP; 13	NHA; 37	SPE; 23	RIV	STA; 14	TMP; 11	MAN	TMP; 29	NHA; 21	MAR; 27	CHE	STA; 32	TMP; 7								23rd	1317	
2009	Art Barry	21	Chevy	TMP; 32	STA; 24	STA; 28	NHA; 7	SPE	RIV	STA; 18	BRI; 14	TMP; 11															26th	910	
2009	Rob Walendy	01	Chevy										NHA; 36	MAR	STA	TMP; 17											26th	910	
2010	Rob Walendy	91	Chevy	TMP; 30	STA	STA	MAR	NHA; 36	LIM	MND	RIV	STA	TMP	BRI	NHA; 28	STA	TMP; 23										39th	301	

==== Whelen Southern Modified Tour ====
NASCAR Whelen Southern Modified Tour results
Year	Car owner	No.	Make	1	2	3	4	5	6	7	8	9	10	11	12	13	14	NSWMTC	Pts	Ref
2011	Rob Wolenty	99	Chevy	CRW	HCY	SBO	CRW	CRW	BGS	BRI	CRW	LGY	THO; 21	TRI	CRW	CLT	CRW	44th	100	
