= Dave Pecko =

American racing driver

- Nationality: American
- Born: June 11, 1966 (age 60) Vandling, Pennsylvania, U.S.

NASCAR Featherlite Modified Tour career
- Debut season: 1998
- Years active: 1998–2001
- Starts: 33
- Championships: 0
- Wins: 0
- Poles: 0
- Best finish: 19th in 1999
- Statistics up to date as of October 18, 2024.

Dave Pecko (born June 11, 1966) is an American professional former stock car racing driver who competed in the NASCAR Featherlite Modified Tour from 1998 to 2001.

Pecko has previously competed in series such as the SMART Modified Tour and the Race of Champions Asphalt Modified Tour.

== Motorsports results ==
=== NASCAR ===
(key) (Bold – Pole position awarded by qualifying time. Italics – Pole position earned by points standings or practice time. * – Most laps led.)

==== Featherlite Modified Tour ====
NASCAR Featherlite Modified Tour results
Year	Team	No.	Make	1	2	3	4	5	6	7	8	9	10	11	12	13	14	15	16	17	18	19	20	21	22	NFMTC	Pts	Ref
1998	N/A	42	Pontiac	RPS	TMP	MAR	STA; 20	NZH; 33	STA	GLN; 17	JEN	RIV	NHA	NHA	LEE	HOL	TMP	NHA	RIV	STA; 27	NHA	TMP	STA	TMP	FLE	45th	405	
1999	Ray Marshall	37	Chevy	TMP; DNQ	RPS; 16	STA; 27	RCH; DNQ	STA; 28	RIV; DNQ	JEN; 9	NHA; 19	NZH; 16	HOL; 22	TMP; 16	NHA; 25	RIV; 16	GLN; 8	STA; 16	RPS; DNQ	TMP; 32	NHA; 30	STA; 22		TMP; 28		19th	1928	
1999	Ray Marshall	37	Pontiac																				MAR; 19			19th	1928	
2000	Ray Marshall	37	Chevy	STA; 12	RCH; 26	STA; DNQ		SEE; DNQ	NHA; 17	NZH; 17	TMP; 22		GLN; 5		STA; DNQ	WFD; 12										23rd	1242	
2000	Ray Marshall	37	Pontiac				RIV; DNQ					RIV; 18		TMP; 26			NHA; 27	STA	MAR	TMP						23rd	1242	
2001	Ray Marshall	37	Pontiac	SBO	TMP	STA	WFD	NZH; 35	STA	RIV	SEE	RCH	NHA	HOL	RIV	CHE; 25	TMP	STA	WFD	TMP	STA	MAR	TMP			77th	146	
