= Todd Szegedy =

American racecar driver

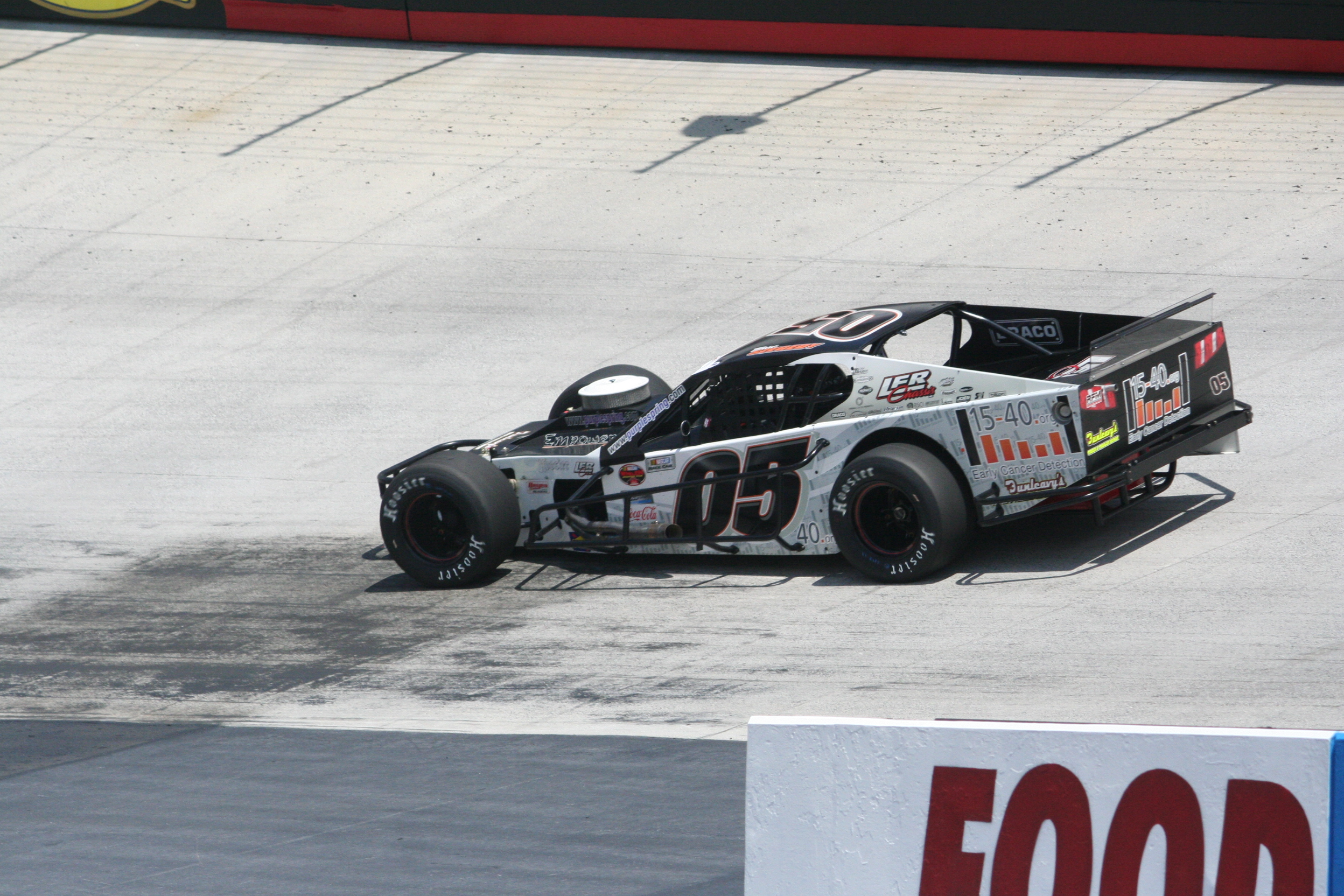
- Szegedy's No. 05 car at Bristol Motor Speedway in 2016
- Born: May 6, 1976 (age 50); Ridgefield, Connecticut, U.S.
- Awards: 2007 Whelen Modified Tour Most Popular Driver; 2003 NASCAR Featherlite Modified Tour Champion; 2002 NASCAR Featherlite Modified Tour Rookie of the Year; 1995 and 1996 SCCA Champion

NASCAR O'Reilly Auto Parts Series career
- 3 races run over 1 year
- Best finish: 83rd (2004)
- First race: 2004 Alan Kulwicki 250 (Milwaukee)
- Last race: 2004 Sam's Town 250 (Memphis)
Wins	Top tens	Poles
0	0	0
- Statistics up to date as of November 26, 2010.

Todd Szegedy (born May 6, 1976) is an American former stock car racing driver. He was the 2003 champion of the NASCAR Whelen Modified Tour.

== Busch Series career ==
In 2004, Szegedy competed in three NASCAR Busch Series races for NEMCO Motorsports in the No. 7 and No. 87 Chevrolets, with an average finish of 25th place. He made his Busch Series debut at the Milwaukee Mile starting in the 23rd position and finishing 21st. His best career finish came at the Memphis Motorsports Park which he started 37th and finished 15th.

Szegedy is best remembered by NASCAR fans for an incident that took place during his qualifying run for his second career start, which came at Chicagoland Speedway in July of 2004 in the No. 7 NEMCO car. During his run, a gigantic inflatable orange promoting race sponsor Tropicana was blown by the wind onto the racing surface, forcing Szegedy to dodge it. Szegedy was granted another qualifying attempt and qualified twelfth.

== Whelen Modified career ==
Szegedy resumed driving in the Whelen Modified Tour part-time since 2000. He has 19 career wins along with 11 pole positions. He was awarded win number sixteen in 2011 at New Hampshire Motor Speedway after Ryan Newman's car was disqualified after failing post race inspection.

== Motorsports career results ==
=== NASCAR ===
(key) (Bold – Pole position awarded by qualifying time. Italics – Pole position earned by points standings or practice time. * – Most laps led.)

==== Busch Series ====
NASCAR Busch Series results
Year	Team	No.	Make	1	2	3	4	5	6	7	8	9	10	11	12	13	14	15	16	17	18	19	20	21	22	23	24	25	26	27	28	29	30	31	32	33	34	NBSC	Pts	Ref
2004	NEMCO Motorsports	87	Chevy	DAY	CAR	LVS	DAR	BRI	TEX	NSH	TAL	CAL	GTY	RCH	NZH	CLT	DOV	NSH	KEN	MLW; 21	DAY												MEM; 15	ATL	PHO	DAR	HOM	83rd	264	
2004	NEMCO Motorsports	7	Chevy																			CHI; 39	NHA	PPR	IRP	MCH; DNQ	BRI	CAL	RCH	DOV	KAN	CLT						83rd	264	

==== Whelen Modified Tour ====
NASCAR Whelen Modified Tour results
Year	Car owner	No.	Make	1	2	3	4	5	6	7	8	9	10	11	12	13	14	15	16	17	18	19	20	NWMTC	Pts	Ref
2000	Info not available	42	Dodge	STA	RCH	STA	RIV	SEE	NHA	NZH	TMP	RIV	GLN; 33	TMP										71st	173	
2000	Info not available	92	Dodge												STA; 18	WFD	NHA	STA	MAR	TMP				71st	173	
2001	Gary Gaydosh	94	Dodge	SBO	TMP	STA; 21	WFD; 9	NZH	STA; 30	RIV	SEE; 7	RCH	NHA	HOL	RIV	CHE	TMP	STA	WFD	TMP				39th	512	
2001	Info not available																				STA; DNQ	MAR		39th	512	
2001	Info not available	55																					TMP; DNQ	39th	512	
2002	Don Barker	50	Ford	TMP; 12	STA; 13	WFD; 2*	NZH; 6	RIV; 11	SEE; 18	RCH; 1*	STA; 10	BEE; 4	NHA; 2	RIV; 7	TMP; 25	STA; 5	WFD; 28	TMP; 19	NHA; 10	STA; 6	MAR; 28	TMP; 19		7th	2497	
2003	Don Barker	50	Ford	TMP; 7	STA; 2	WFD; 4	NZH; 5		LER; 1*	BLL; 21	**BEE**; 1*	NHA; 2	ADI; 1	RIV; 15	TMP; 2	STA; 1	WFD; 2	TMP; 32	NHA; 7	**STA**; 17	TMP; 8			1st	2716	
2003	Don Barker	50	Chevy					STA; 2*																1st	2716	
2004	Don Barker	50	Ford	TMP; 38*	STA; 4	WFD; 5	NZH; 1*	STA; 15	RIV; 23	LER; 2	BLL	BEE; 9	NHA; 27	SEE; 18	RIV; 24	STA; 1	TMP	WFD; 1	TMP; 15	NHA; 2	STA; 6	TMP; 20		11th	2247	
2005	Jan Boehler	3	Chevy	TMP	STA; 3	RIV	WFD	STA	JEN	NHA	BEE	SEE	RIV	STA	TMP	WFD								48th	299	
2005	Joe Brady	00	Chevy														MAR; 10	TMP	NHA	STA	TMP			48th	299	
2006	Mike Smeriglio III	2	Ford	TMP; 17	STA; 12	JEN; 8	TMP; 1	STA; 23	NHA; 6	HOL; 6	RIV; 9	STA; 6	TMP; 21	MAR; 4	TMP; 11	NHA; 5*	WFD; 27	TMP; 16	**STA**; 1*					5th	2165	
2007	Mike Smeriglio III	2	Ford	TMP; 19	STA; 2	WTO; 8	STA; 5	TMP; 5	NHA; 5	TSA; 8	RIV; 16	STA; 2	TMP; 1	MAN; 9	MAR; 15	**NHA**; 1*	TMP; 3	**STA**; 15*	TMP; 27					2nd	2291	
2008	Mike Smeriglio III	2	Ford	TMP; 7	STA; 9	STA; 2	TMP; 6	NHA; 7	SPE; 7	RIV; 14	STA; 16	TMP; 20*	MAN; 23	TMP; 1	NHA; 13	MAR; 5	CHE; 2	STA; 4	TMP; 8					3rd	2260	
2009	Mike Smeriglio III	2	Ford	TMP; 5	STA; 2	STA; 3	NHA; 8*	SPE; 2*	RIV; 8	STA; 10	BRI; 5	TMP; 3	NHA; 29	MAR; 2	STA; 20	TMP; 29								5th	1823	
2010	Mike Smeriglio III	2	Ford	TMP; 5	STA; 5	STA; 3	MAR; 3	NHA; 15	**LIM**; 2*	MND; 25	RIV; 22	STA; 1*	TMP; 6	BRI; 4	NHA; 24	STA; 11	TMP; 20							5th	1957	
2011	Mike Smeriglio III	2	Ford	TMP; 22	STA; 24	STA; 6	**MND**; 1*	TMP; 6	NHA; 1	RIV; 2	STA; 14	NHA; 3	BRI; 3	DEL; 3	TMP; 5	**LRP**; 1*	NHA; 2	STA; 21	TMP; 25					2nd	2367	
2012	Mike Smeriglio III	2	Ford	TMP; 27	STA; 12	MND; 3	STA; 4	WFD; 19	NHA; 5	STA; 3	TMP; 10	BRI; 2*	TMP; 4	RIV; 3	NHA; 26	STA; 23	TMP; 3							5th	476	
2013	Mike Smeriglio III	2	Chevy	TMP; 16	STA; 18				NHA; 14						NHA; 1	STA; 4	TMP; 9							6th	477	
2013	Mike Smeriglio III	2	Ford			STA; 13	**WFD**; 6*	RIV; 19		MND; 16	STA; 11	TMP; 9	BRI; 2	RIV; 9										6th	477	
2014	Barbara Park	20	Chevy	TMP	STA	STA	WFD	RIV; 28																25th	162	
2014	Rob Fuller	15	Chevy						NHA; 22	MND	STA	TMP; 8		NHA; 2	STA	TMP; 24								25th	162	
2014	Rob Fuller	05	Chevy										BRI; 20											25th	162	
2015	Robert Garbarino	4	Dodge	TMP; 10	STA; 2	WFD; 19	STA; 4	TMP; 3	RIV; 2	NHA; 1	MND; 4	STA; 16	TMP; 3		RIV; 9	NHA; 20	STA; 10	TMP; 4						4th	535	
2015	Robert Garbarino	41	Dodge											BRI; 23										4th	535	
2016	Monica Fuller	15	Chevy	TMP	STA; 2	WFD	STA	TMP	RIV	NHA; 10	MND	STA	TMP											28th	120	
2016	Rob Fuller	05	Chevy											**BRI**; 2*	RIV	OSW	SEE	NHA	STA	TMP				28th	120	
2017	Robert Katon	85	Chevy	MYR; 26	THO; 10	STA; 23	LGY; 24	THO; 27	RIV	NHA; 25	STA; 24	THO	BRI	SEE	OSW	RIV	NHA	STA	THO					31st	149	

==== Whelen Southern Modified Tour ====
NASCAR Whelen Southern Modified Tour results
Year	Car owner	No.	Make	1	2	3	4	5	6	7	8	9	10	11	12	13	14	NSWMTC	Pts	Ref
2011	Mike Smeriglio III	22	Ford	CRW; 9	HCY	SBO	CRW	CRW	BGS	BRI	CRW	LGY	THO	TRI	CRW	CLT	CRW	34th	138	

Sporting positions
Preceded by Mike Stefanik	NASCAR Winston Modified Tour Champion; 2003	Succeeded by Tony Hirschman, Jr.
