= Reggie Ruggiero =

American racing driver (born 1951)

- Born: John Ruggiero; July 28, 1951 (age 75); Rocky Hill, Connecticut, U.S.

NASCAR O'Reilly Auto Parts Series career
- 4 races run over 3 years
- 1995 position: 113th
- Best finish: 54th (1987)
- First race: 1987 Miller 500 (Martinsville)
- Last race: 1995 NE Chevy Dealers 250 (Loudon)
| Wins | Top tens | Poles |
|---|---|---|
| 0 | 1 | 0 |

John "Reggie" Ruggiero is an American former NASCAR driver. He is known for his dominance in the NASCAR Whelen Modified Tour in the 1990s despite never winning the championship.

Ruggiero was a partner with Ed Flemke Jr. at Race Works, a manufacturer of modified chassis. Flemke took over sole control of the business when Ruggiero moved to North Carolina to work at Stewart–Haas Racing.

== Racing career ==
=== NASCAR Busch Series ===
Ruggiero debuted in the Busch Series in 1987, where he drove the No. 90 Cox Chevrolet to a tenth place finish after he had started 20th. He returned to the car for the next race at Darlington, where he finished 26th after starting 27th. He was then replaced by Rusty Wallace for the remainder of the season.

In 1993, Ruggiero drove the No. 13 Auto Palace Chevrolet at Loudon, and started 23rd. A crash caused him to finish 30th in the race.

Ruggiero's fourth and last race in the series was in 1995, where he drove his own No. 06 Chevrolet at Loudon to a 20th place finish after starting 18th.

=== NASCAR Whelen Modified Tour ===
Ruggiero raced in the Modified Tour from 1985 until 2009; a total of 24 years. He has participated in a total of 419 races in the series and won 44 of those races. He has also finished as runner-up in the points standings seven times.

Ruggiero has the third most wins in the series as of 2025, with 44 victories, 30 behind from Mike Stefanik's 74.

== After racing ==
Ruggiero later found work in the chassis shop of Stewart–Haas Racing, where he helped them in building their cars. He has also been inducted into the New England Auto Racers Hall of Fame.

Despite sharing the same last name, he is not related to current NASCAR Craftsman Truck Series driver Gio Ruggiero.

== Motorsports career results ==
=== NASCAR ===
(key) (Bold – Pole position awarded by qualifying time. Italics – Pole position earned by points standings or practice time. * – Most laps led.)

==== Busch Series ====
NASCAR Busch Series results
| Year | Team | No. | Make | 1 | 2 | 3 | 4 | 5 | 6 | 7 | 8 | 9 | 10 | 11 | 12 | 13 | 14 | 15 | 16 | 17 | 18 | 19 | 20 | 21 | 22 | 23 | 24 | 25 | 26 | 27 | 28 | NBSC | Pts | Ref |
|---|---|---|---|---|---|---|---|---|---|---|---|---|---|---|---|---|---|---|---|---|---|---|---|---|---|---|---|---|---|---|---|---|---|---|
| 1987 | Shugart Racing | 90 | Chevy | DAY | HCY | MAR; 10 | | | | | | | | | | | | | | | | | | | | | | | | | | 54th | 134 | |
| 1987 | Shugart Racing | 90 | Buick | | | | DAR; 26 | BRI | LGY | SBO | CLT | DOV | IRP | ROU | JFC | | | | | | | | | | | | | | | | | 54th | 134 | |
| 1987 | | 80 | Ford | | | | | | | | | | | | | OXF; DNQ | SBO | HCY | RAL | LGY | ROU | BRI | JFC | DAR | RCH | DOV | MAR | CLT | CAR | MAR | | 54th | 134 | |
| 1993 | | 13 | Chevy | DAY | CAR | RCH | DAR | BRI | HCY | ROU | MAR | NZH | CLT | DOV | MYB | GLN | MLW | TAL | IRP | MCH | NHA; 30 | BRI | DAR | RCH | DOV | ROU | CLT | MAR | CAR | HCY | ATL | NA | - | |
| 1995 | Ruggiero Racing | 06 | Chevy | DAY | CAR | RCH | ATL | NSV | DAR | BRI | HCY | NHA; 20 | NZH | CLT | DOV | MYB | GLN | MLW | TAL | SBO | IRP | MCH | BRI | DAR | RCH | DOV | CLT | CAR | HOM | | | NA | - | |
