= NASCAR Whelen Modified Tour =

American auto racing series

- Category: Prototype-based stock cars
- Country: United States
- Inaugural season: 1947
- Constructors: Troyer, Chassis Dynamics, RaceWorks, Spatco, LFR, Fury Race Cars, PSR
- Engine suppliers: Hutter, Bob Bruneau, Performance Engines by Billy the Kid, Performance Technology, ECR, Robert Yates Racing, Pettit Racing Engines
- Tire suppliers: American Racer
- Official website: Whelen Modified Tour

The NASCAR Whelen Modified Tour (NWMT) (previously the NASCAR Winston Modified Tour and NASCAR Featherlite Modified Series from 1985 until 2005) is a modified stock car racing series owned and operated by NASCAR. The Modified Division is NASCAR's oldest division, and is the only open-wheeled division that NASCAR sanctions. NASCAR Whelen Modified Tour events are mainly held in the northeastern United States, but the 2007 and 2008 tours expanded to the Midwest with the addition of a race in Mansfield, Ohio. The tour races primarily on short oval paved tracks, but the NWMT also has made appearances at larger ovals and road courses.

== History ==
=== Modified Division (1947–1984) ===
The NASCAR Modified Division was formed as part of NASCAR's creation in December 1947. NASCAR held a modified race as its first sanctioned event, on February 15, 1948, on the beach course at Daytona Beach, Florida. Red Byron won the event and 11 more races that year, and won the first NASCAR Modified Championship. (The Strictly Stock Division, which evolved into today's premier Cup Series, did not race until 1949.) Post-World War II modifieds were a form of "stock car" (contrasted against purpose-built AAA championship cars, sprints, and midgets) which allowed some modification, typically substitution of stronger truck parts. Most cars were pre-WWII coupes and coaches. This pattern continued through the 1960s, with aftermarket performance parts and later-model chassis (such as the 1955–57 Chevrolet's frame) becoming more common. Modifieds became known for technical innovation, both in homebuilt parts and in adapting components from other types of vehicles. By 1970, many modifieds featured big-block engines, fuel injection, eighteen-inch-wide rear tires, radically offset engine locations, and other technologies that made them faster on short tracks than any full-bodied race cars including Grand National cars.

The predecessor to the NASCAR Whelen Modified Tour was NASCAR's National Modified Championship, which was determined by total points from weekly NASCAR-sanctioned races as well as a schedule of national championship races. Parts of the northeastern and southeastern US were hotbeds of modified racing in the 1950s and 1960s; some racers competed five nights per week or more. Often the same car was raced on both dirt and paved tracks, changing only tires and perhaps springs and shock absorbers. In the late 1960s and early 1970s, the technology of dirt and pavement modifieds diverged to make them separate types of race car. NASCAR was no longer sanctioning dirt tracks which held modified races, so the NASCAR modified rules became the standard for asphalt Modifieds. (Starting in the early 1970s, northeastern US dirt modified racetracks began to join the DIRT organization founded by Glenn Donnelly.) Most unsanctioned tracks used similar modified rules to NASCAR's, or specified the same cars with cost-limiting rules such as smaller engines or narrow tires.

In the 1980s, it became prohibitively expensive for modified teams to tow long distances to sixty or more races per year, including Watkins Glen International and Daytona International Speedway, Bowman Gray Stadium in Winston-Salem, North Carolina, North Wilkesboro Speedway, and Martinsville Speedway, with the North Wilkesboro races part of the Cup weekend. To enable more than a few teams to contend seriously for the championship, it was decided to reformat the Modified Division's championship to a limited schedule of races not conflicting with one another. This change mirrored similar format changes to the Grand National Division starting in 1972 and the Late Model Sportsman Division (now Xfinity Series) starting in 1982. Richie Evans ran 66 NASCAR modified features (and several unsanctioned events such as the Race of Champions) in 1984, the final year of the old system.

=== Whelen Modified Tour (1985–present) ===
The modern-day NASCAR Whelen Modified Tour was first held in 1985 with 29 races, named the "NASCAR Winston Modified Tour". It switched sponsorship to the Featherlite Trailers brand in 1994, and was renamed the "NASCAR Featherlite Modified Series".

Two major changes to the NASCAR Whelen Modified Tour came in 2005.

In 2005, Whelen Engineering took over sponsorship of the series, which was renamed the "NASCAR Whelen Modified Tour".

Beginning in 2005, NASCAR sanctioned a new modified division in the southeastern United States known as the Whelen Southern Modified Tour. The two tours agreed to run a combined race at Martinsville Speedway.

==== 1985 ====
Richie Evans, the first NASCAR national touring division driver to capture nine national championships is tied with Mike Stefanik for the most NASCAR championships in the Modifieds, won his last championship posthumously in 1985, the first year of the Winston Modified Tour. Driving his own designed and built cars and maintained in his own shop in Rome, NY for sponsor concrete magnate B.R. DeWitt, Evans won 12 of his 28 starts on the tour, including five consecutive victories at five tracks in July and August. Billy Nacewicz was the team's crew chief. Other strong contenders on the tour included Stefanik, George Kent, Jimmy Spencer, Brian Ross, Reggie Ruggiero, Brett Bodine, Charlie Jarzombek, Jeff Fuller, George Brunnhoelzl, Doug Heveron, Jamie Tomaino, John Rosati, Corky Cookman, Greg Sacks, Mike McLaughlin, and Bugs Stevens. Many other top racers focused on their local tracks but ran limited tour schedules. In October, the season ended in tragedy when Evans was killed in an accident while practicing for the final race of the tour season, the Winn-Dixie 500 at Martinsville Speedway. He had already clinched the title; Mike McLaughlin, driving for Len Boehler, finished second in the points standings.

==== 2017 ====
Following the 2016 season, the NASCAR Whelen Southern Modified Tour ceased operation and was merged with the Whelen Modified Tour. For 2017, Bristol and Charlotte were brought over in the merger and Myrtle Beach was added to start the season. During the 2017 season, Ted Christopher died in a plane crash near North Branford on September 16 enroute to race at a tour event that night at Riverhead Raceway. The car owner later dropped out of the event and Christopher was credited with a Did Not Start and last place position. Christopher was honored during the next race held at New Hampshire with a decal displayed on the cars and with Woody Pitkat driving Ted Christopher's modified. Stafford Motor Speedway retired his number 13 from its weekly modified racing.

==== 2018 ====
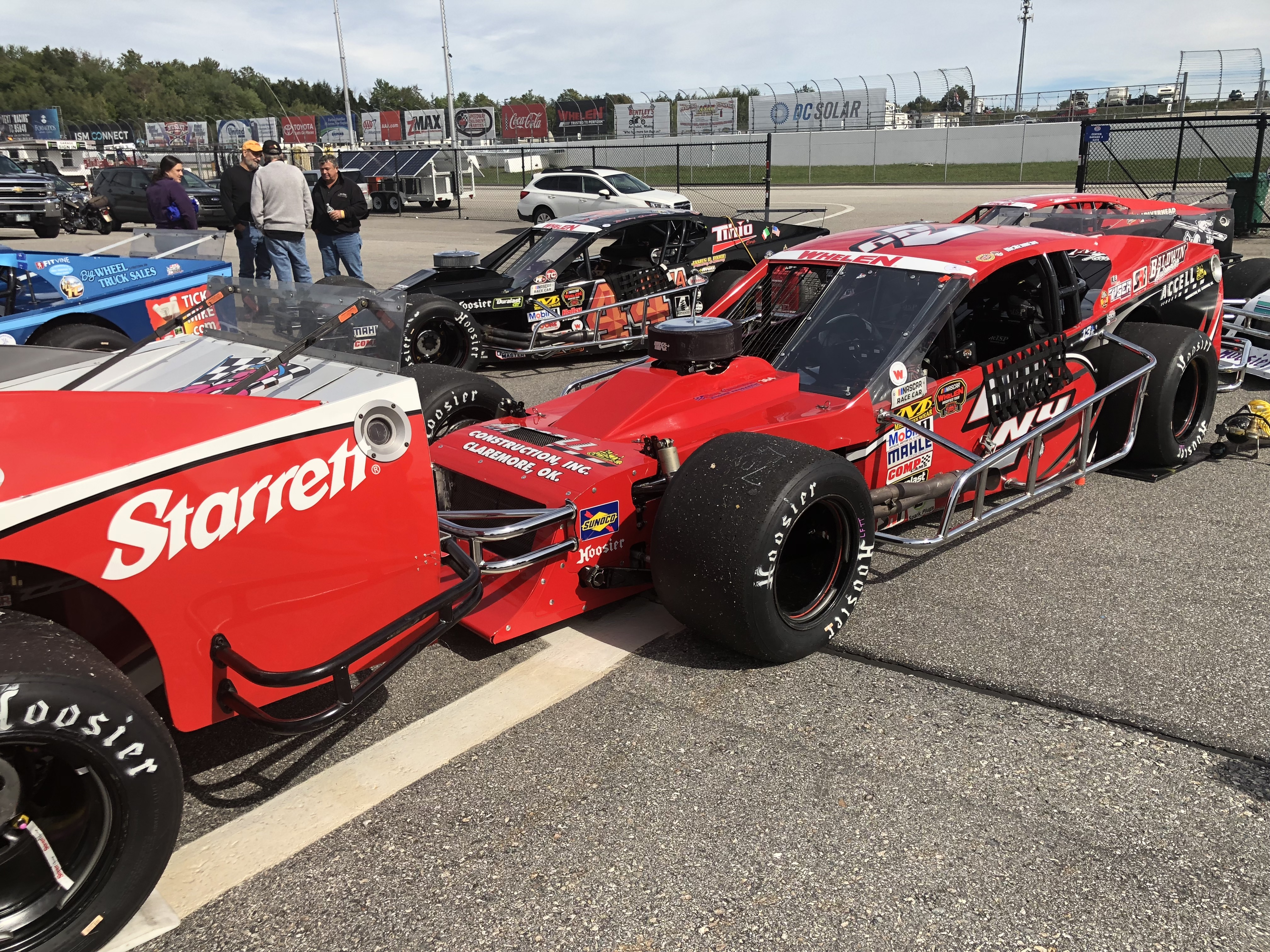
2018 7NY from Tommy Baldwin Jr. line up in the garage before the Musket 250 at New Hampshire Motor Speedway.

The NASCAR Cup Series and Truck Series dropped a race at New Hampshire Motor Speedway in favor of Las Vegas. New Hampshire replaced the series with the "Full Throttle Weekend", with the NASCAR Whelen Modified Tour Musket 250. It became the longest race on the tour (250 laps, 264.5 miles (425.7 km)). The weekend also featured the NASCAR K&N Pro Series East with the Apple Barrel 125 (which featured a driver from the Euro series and another from the Mexico series, and, for the first time since its formation in 2007, a NASCAR Pinty's Series race outside of Canada (the Granite 100).

==== 2019 ====
For 2019, the tour went back to South Boston for the first time since the merger of the northern tour and the southern tour.

Beginning with 2019, all NASCAR modified events will be live on Fanschoice.tv.

==== 2020 ====
The 2020 season was one of constant change, as the planned season was temporarily put on hold due to the COVID-19 pandemic. Many races were postponed or cancelled, while others were added to help fill the schedule. Justin Bonsignore, on the strength of three wins, won the championship. Jennerstown returned to the Tour for the first time in 2006, hosting two races, while New Hampshire's White Mountain Motorsports Park hosted back-to-back races that were the WMT's first ever visit to the beautiful bullring in White Mountains.

Six-time champion Doug Coby saw his Mike Smeriglio III Racing team close as Smeriglio chose to retire after a very successful career. Coby would form his own team in partnership with Steve Pickens, scoring one win at WMMP. Jon Mckennedy showed great speed on his way to second in points driving for Tommy Baldwin Racing, while Craig Lutz had a breakout year scoring wins at Jennerstown and Thompson.

==== 2021 ====
2021 saw the WMT return to two southern venues in Martinsville Speedway and Richmond Raceway, as well as an additional race at both Oswego Speedway and Riverhead Raceway. Lancaster Raceway and Beech Ridge Motor Speedway also made their returns after long stretches without WMT races. Patrick Emerling and Justin Bonsignore ran head to head right down to the wire at the final race of the season at Stafford Speedway. Bonsignore would win at the storied CT race track as he clinched the 2021 title on the strength of two wins.

Cup series regular Ryan Preece would have a solid year, scoring wins at New Hampshire, Stafford, and Richmond. Tragically his car owner Eddie Partridge would pass away in the hours after the win at Richmond. The loss was huge for the modified racing community, as Partridge was one of the strongest supporters of modifieds over the years, fielding cars in many series, as well as saving the Riverhead Raceway.

Doug Coby made a bold move to miss the first race at Oswego to run in the inaugural Superstar Racing Experience race at Stafford - a move that proved fruitful as he would go on to beat the star studded field in front of a live national TV audience. The win parlayed Coby to his first career NASCAR Camping World Truck series start, scoring a 12th place finish at Bristol driving the GMS Racing 24 truck.

A large story line was the absence of any races at the fabled Thompson Speedway Motorsports Park. After being on the WMT schedule every year since the tours inception in 1985, the managing partners of the speedway decided to hold open tour type modified races instead. This did not prove popular amongst fans and teams alike, however TSMP returned to the WMT schedule for the 2022 season.

== The cars ==
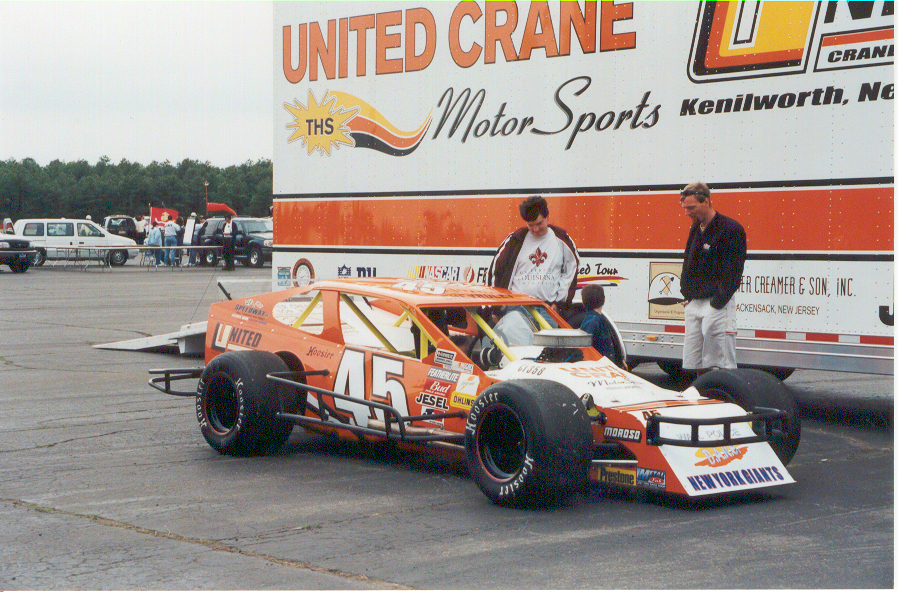
No. 45 modified car, courtesy of Navy Lakehurst

NASCAR Whelen Modified Tour cars are substantially different from their NASCAR Cup Series counterparts. Today's cars are based on tubular chassis built by fabricators such as Troyer Engineering, Chassis Dynamics, Spafco, Raceworks and Fury Race Cars / LFR Chassis. Bodies are related to their passenger car counterparts in only two ways. There is a "manufacturers" logo placed on the car, and a logo indicating the type of road car it is alleged to be. Neither logo is actually associated with the actual manufacturer of the race vehicle. Whelen Modified cars are also largely fabricated from sheetmetal, with the front wheels and much of the front suspension exposed. A NASCAR Whelen Modified car is 11 in (280 mm) shorter in height and over 23 in (580 mm) wider than a Cup car. By rule, tour-type modifieds weigh at least 2,610 lb (1,180 kg) (with additional weight for engines 358 cu in [5.9 L] and larger) and have a wheelbase of 107 in (270 cm). They are powered by small-block V-8 engines, usually of 355 to 368 cu in (5.8 to 6.0 L) of displacement, although larger or smaller engines can be used. Engine components are largely similar to those used in the Cup Series, but Whelen Modified Tour engines use a small four-barrel carburetor (rated at 390 cu ft [11 m^{3}] per minute, about half the airflow of previous modified carburetors), which limits their output to 625 to 700 hp (466 to 522 kW). On large tracks such as New Hampshire Motor Speedway, the engines must have a restrictor plate between the carburetor and intake manifold, reducing engine power and car speed for safety reasons. Approved "body styles" for 2006 include the Chevrolet Cavalier and Monte Carlo, the Dodge Avenger and Stealth, the Ford Mustang and Escort, the Plymouth Laser and Sundance, and the Pontiac Sunbird, J2000, and Grand Prix.

All Modified Tour cars use tires from American Racer. The series previously had a partnership with Hoosier Racing Tire from 1999 to 2025.

=== Safety ===
Richie Evans' 1985 death at Martinsville, along with other asphalt modified fatalities such as Charlie Jarzombek (in 1987), Corky Cookman (1987), Tommy Druar (1989), Don Pratt (1989), and Tony Jankowiak (1990), led to questions about car rigidity with tour modifieds, and safety changes. In particular, straight frame rails were phased out, with new chassis required to have a step which could bend in hard impacts rather than passing the force to the driver. The death of Tom Baldwin, Sr. in 2004 led to more safety modifications, with HANS devices (or equivalents) and left side headrests becoming mandatory. For the 2008 season, rear bumpers were shortened in response to the 2007 death of John Blewett III.

In July 1999, after a severed wheel caused a fatality at an Indy Racing League event at Lowe's Motor Speedway, NASCAR began requiring the Featherlite Modified Series teams (and eventually all NASCAR divisions) to add steel cables as tethers linking each front spindle to the chassis, the steel cables were later replaced with marine rope which is stronger and weighs less.

== Public stature ==
The series has been a minor league with a strong and loyal regional following. Most national media attention has appeared in racing-centered publications (magazines such as Stock Car Racing Magazine and Speedway Illustrated, and newspapers such as Speed Sport and Speedway Scene) rather than general mass media. In the 21st century, several books about historical modified drivers have been published. The series was featured in the EA Sports NASCAR series starting in NASCAR 2005: Chase for the Cup, though beginning with NASCAR 08, the series became exclusive to PlayStation 2 releases; additionally, all Whelen Modified Tour drivers in the aforementioned games (and NASCAR: Dirt to Daytona, the first video game to feature the series) are fictional characters specifically created for the games.

No full-time Cup Series driver competed regularly in Whelen Modified Tour events until 2010, when Ryan Newman won at Bristol and won twice at New Hampshire driving for Kevin Manion. However, Ron Bouchard, Geoff Bodine, Brett Bodine, Steve Park, and Jimmy Spencer went on from WMT competition to become race winners at the Cup level. Other WMT veterans such as Ryan Preece, Mike McLaughlin, and Jeff Fuller have advanced to become race winners and championship contenders in the Xfinity Series, the top minor league under the Cup Series. Two-time Xfinity Series champion Randy Lajoie also began racing modifieds in Connecticut before moving on the NASCAR. Randy’s son, Corey Lajoie has also won in the Modified Tour. Son of Mike McLaughlin, Max has also competed in the Modified Tour. Cup Series crew chiefs that started in WMT include Tommy Baldwin Jr. and Greg Zipadelli.

Flosports has live coverage of all races, with some tape-delayed on CNBC.

In 2023, the Modified Tour has support races with the New Smyrna Speedway meeting that is part of Daytona 500 ancillary events, and is part of Cup Series at Richmond Raceway, New Hampshire Motor Speedway, and Martinsville Speedway. Starting in 2025, they will join the NASCAR All-Star Race schedule at North Wilkesboro Speedway (which hosted a standalone race in October 2024 that became part of a CARS Tour and SMART Modified weekend because of Hurricane Helene). Typically, a name driver is recruited to participate in the race to pique the interest of casual fans. For example, Cup Series driver Carl Edwards and defending Cup champion Tony Stewart raced in the July 2006 race. In the past, they have raced at Bristol Motor Speedway and been part of INDYCAR races at Richmond and New Hampshire.

== Notable drivers ==
Certain drivers are notable specifically for their NASCAR Whelen Modified Tour careers.

=== All-time top 10 drivers ===
The following drivers were named to the NASCAR Modified all-time top 10 list in 2003:

1. Richie Evans – Evans won nine modified titles between 1973 and 1985, a championship total that was unmatched in all of NASCAR until Stefanik's championship in 2006; 52 wins in 84 NASCAR and unsanctioned events in 1979
2. Mike Stefanik – seven WMT and two Busch North championships
3. Jerry Cook – six NASCAR National Modified Championships in the 1970s, helped direct the series' changes as series director in 1985
4. Ray Hendrick – raced "anything, anywhere" from the 1950s to 1970s
5. Geoff Bodine – in the Guinness Book of World Records for winning 55 modified races in 1978
6. Tony Hirschman, Jr. – has won five WMT championships
7. Bugs Stevens – won three consecutive NASCAR National Modified Championships, in 1967–69
8. Fred DeSarro – 1970 NASCAR National Modified champion
9. Jimmy Spencer – 1986 and 1987 WMT champion
10. Reggie Ruggiero – the "best driver to never win a championship", his 44 victories rank him second to Stefanik since the modern era began in 1985

=== Wade Cole ===
Wade Cole (March 9, 1953 – March 15, 2020) was a fixture in the NASCAR Whelen Modified Tour. Between 1985 and 2019, Cole competed in 371 NWMT races, achieving seven top-ten finishes. He earned a career best eighth place finish twice, once in 1993 and again in 2008. His 371 starts place him eighth all time since the series inception in 1985. Cole died in a home accident on March 15, 2020. In 2020, a race on the tour was renamed for him.

== Results ==
=== Champions ===
Year	Driver	Team owner	Wins	Number	Make	Sponsor	Chassis
1985	Richie Evans	B.R.DeWitt	12	61	Chevrolet	DeWitt Construction	Evans
1986	Jimmy Spencer (1)	Frank Cicci Racing	4	24	Oldsmobile	Apple House Trucking / Quick Stop Beverage	Troyer
1987	Jimmy Spencer (2)	Frank Cicci Racing	6	24	Oldsmobile	Apple House Trucking / Quick Stop Beverage	Troyer
1988	Mike McLaughlin	Sherwood Racing Team	5	12	Chevrolet	Sherri-Cup	RaceWorks
1989	Mike Stefanik (1)	Jack Koszela	7	15	Chevrolet	Koszela Speed	Stefanik
1990	Jamie Tomaino	Danny Ust	1	U2	Pontiac	Danny's Market	Troyer
1991	Mike Stefanik (2)	Jack Koszela	5	15	Pontiac	Auto Palace / ADAP	Stefanik
1992	Jeff Fuller	Sheba Racing	6	8	Chevrolet	Sunoco Race Fuels	Troyer
1993	Rick Fuller	Curt Chase Racing	2	77	Pontiac	Polar Beverages	Spafco
1994	Wayne Anderson	Lenny Boehler/BRE Racing	1	3	Chevrolet	BRE Racing	BRE
1995	Tony Hirschman, Jr. (1)	Lenny Boehler/BRE Racing	1	3	Chevrolet	BRE Racing	BRE
1996	Tony Hirschman, Jr. (2)	Lenny Boehler/BRE Racing	3	3	Chevrolet	BRE Racing	BRE
1997	Mike Stefanik (3)	Peter Beal/Charlie Bacon	10	x6	Chevrolet	Burnham Boilers	Stefanik
1998	Mike Stefanik (4)	Peter Beal/Charlie Bacon	13	x6	Chevrolet	Burnham Boilers	Stefanik
1999	Tony Hirschman, Jr. (3)	Gary Cretty	6	25	Dodge	ATC	Stefanik
2000	Jerry Marquis	Mario Fiore	5	44	Pontiac	Teddy Bear Pools	Troyer
2001	Mike Stefanik (5)	Art Barry	3	21	Chevrolet	New England Egg	Spafco
2002	Mike Stefanik (6)	Art Barry	2	21	Chevrolet	Lombardi's Inside-Out	Spafco
2003	Todd Szegedy	Don Barker	4	50	Ford	Haynes Materials	Chassis Dynamics
2004	Tony Hirschman, Jr. (4)	Bob and Tom Kehley	4	48	Chevrolet	Kamco Supply	Troyer
2005	Tony Hirschman, Jr. (5)	Bob and Tom Kehley	5	48	Chevrolet	Kamco Supply	Troyer
2006	Mike Stefanik (7)	Eric Sanderson/Flamingo Motorsports	1	16	Pontiac	Diversified Metals	Troyer
2007	Donny Lia (1)	Bob Garbarino/Mystic Missile Racing	6	v4	Dodge	Mystic River Marina	Troyer
2008	Ted Christopher	Eddie Whalen	4	36	Chevrolet	Al-Lee Installations	Troyer
2009	Donny Lia (2)	Bob Garbarino/Mystic Missile Racing	4	v4	Dodge	Mystic River Marina	Troyer
2010	Bobby Santos III	Bob Garbarino/Mystic Missile Racing	4	v4	Dodge	Mystic River Marina	Troyer
2011	Ron Silk (1)	Ed Partridge	3	6	Chevrolet	T.S. Haulers/Calverton Tree Farm	Troyer
2012	Doug Coby (1)	Wayne Darling	5	52	Chevrolet	Sims Metal Management/Reynolds Auto Wrecking/Seekonk Grand Prix	Troyer
2013	Ryan Preece	Eric Sanderson/Flamingo Motorsports	4	16	Ford	East West Marine/Diversified Metals	Troyer
2014	Doug Coby (2)	Mike Smeriglio III	1	2	Ford/Chevrolet	Dunleavy's Truck & Trailer Repair/A&J Romano Construction/HEX Performance	Troyer
2015	Doug Coby (3)	Mike Smeriglio III	7	2	Chevrolet	Dunleavy's Truck & Trailer Repair/A&J Romano Construction/HEX Performance	LFR
2016	Doug Coby (4)	Mike Smeriglio III	5	2	Chevrolet	Dunleavy's Truck & Trailer Repair/A&J Romano Construction	LFR
2017	Doug Coby (5)	Mike Smeriglio III	1	2	Chevrolet	Mayhew Tools	LFR
2018	Justin Bonsignore	Ken Massa Motorsports	8	51	Chevrolet	Phoenix Communications	LFR
2019	Doug Coby (6)	Mike Smeriglio III	4	2	Chevrolet	Mayhew Tools	LFR
2020	Justin Bonsignore (2)	Ken Massa Motorsports	3	51	Chevrolet	Phoenix Communications	Fury
2021	Justin Bonsignore (3)	Ken Massa Motorsports	2	51	Chevrolet	Phoenix Communications	Fury
2022	Jon McKennedy	Lepine Motorsports	1	79	Chevrolet	Middlesex Interiors	LFR
2023	Ron Silk (2)	Haydt Yannone Racing	5	16	Chevrolet	Blue Mountain Machine and Future Homes	Fury
2024	Justin Bonsignore (4)	Ken Massa Motorsports	5	51	Chevrolet	Phoenix Communications	Fury
2025	Austin Beers	KLM Motorsports	2	64	Chevrolet	G&G Electrical Supply/Dell Electric/Fast Track Electric	Troyer
2026	Patrick Emerling	USNEPower Motorsports	5	1	Chevrolet	USNEPower	LFR

=== Rookie of the Year ===
Year	Driver
1999	Dave Pecko
2000	Michael Boehler
2001	Ricky Miller
2002	Todd Szegedy
2003	Donny Lia
2004	Ken Barry
2005	Tyler Haydt
2006	James Civali
2007	Richard Savary
2008	Glen Reen
2009	Eric Goodale
2010	Justin Bonsignore
2011	Patrick Emerling
2012	Keith Rocco
2013	Cole Powell
2014	Timmy Solomito
2015	Chase Dowling
2016	Matthew Swanson
2017	Calvin Carroll
2018	Tommy Catalano
2019	Sam Rameau
2020	Tyler Rypkema
2021	Not Awarded
2022	Austin Beers
2023	Jake Johnson
2024	Trevor Catalano
2025	Stephen Kopcik
2026	Teddy Hodgdon

=== Most Popular Driver Award ===
NASCAR stopped awarding the Most Popular Driver Award in the Modified Tour from the 2017 season.

Year	Driver
1985	Mike McLaughlin
1986	Jamie Tomaino
1987	Jamie Tomaino
1988	Reggie Ruggiero
1989	Reggie Ruggiero
1990	Satch Worley
1991	Satch Worley
1992	Jeff Fuller
1993	Jeff Fuller
1994	Jeff Fuller
1995	Steve Park
1996	Steve Park
1997	Mike Stefanik
1998	Mike Stefanik
1999	Reggie Ruggiero
2000	Rick Fuller
2001	Mike Stefanik
2002	Ed Flemke Jr.
2003	Tom Baldwin
2004	Tom Baldwin
2005	Tony Hirschman Jr.
2006	Tony Hirschman Jr.
2007	Todd Szegedy
2008	Ted Christopher
2009	Ted Christopher
2010	Ted Christopher
2011	Justin Bonsignore
2012	Ryan Preece
2013	Mike Stefanik
2014	Melissa Fifield
2015	Melissa Fifield
2016	Melissa Fifield

=== Pre-tour Most Popular Driver Award ===
Year	Driver
1965	Bobby Allison
1966	Runt Harris
1967	Al Grinnan
1968	Red Farmer
1969	Ray Hendrick
1970	Ray Hendrick
1971	Bugs Stevens
1972	Bugs Stevens
1973	Richie Evans
1974	Richie Evans
1975	Richie Evans
1976	Jerry Cook
1977	Harry Gant
1978	Richie Evans
1979	Richie Evans
1980	Richie Evans
1981	Richie Evans
1982	Richie Evans
1983	Richie Evans
1984	Brian Ross

== See also ==
- NASCAR
- Whelen Southern Modified Tour
- NASCAR Regional Racing
- PASS
