= Dave Sapienza =

American racing driver

- Nationality: American
- Born: May 11, 1965 (age 61) Riverhead, New York, U.S.

NASCAR Whelen Modified Tour career
- Debut season: 2014
- Current team: Judy Thilberg
- Years active: 2014–present
- Car number: 36
- Crew chief: Greg Kleila
- Starts: 132
- Championships: 0
- Wins: 0
- Poles: 0
- Best finish: 7th in 2017, 2020
- Finished last season: 20th (2026)
- Statistics up to date as of October 12, 2026.

David Sapienza (born May 11, 1965) is an American professional stock car racing driver who competes part-time in the NASCAR Whelen Modified Tour, driving the No. 36 for Judy Thilberg.

Sapienza has previously competed in series such as the Tri-Track Open Modified Series, the EXIT Realty Modified Touring Series, and the World Series of Asphalt Stock Car Racing.

== Motorsports results ==
=== NASCAR ===
(key) (Bold – Pole position awarded by qualifying time. Italics – Pole position earned by points standings or practice time. * – Most laps led.)

==== Whelen Modified Tour ====
NASCAR Whelen Modified Tour results
Year	Car owner	No.	Make	1	2	3	4	5	6	7	8	9	10	11	12	13	14	15	16	17	18	NWMTC	Pts	Ref
2014	Jarod Zeltmann	5	Chevy	TMP	STA	STA	WFD	RIV	NHA	MND	STA	TMP	BRI	NHA	STA	TMP; 29						50th	15	
2015	Jarod Zeltmann	36	Chevy	TMP; 21	STA; 18	WAT; 13	STA; 20	TMP; 19	RIV; 10	NHA; 15	MON; 20	STA; 14	TMP; 26	BRI; DNQ	RIV; 23	NHA; 9	STA; 26	TMP; 32				17th	369	
2016	Judy Thilberg	36	Chevy	TMP; 19	STA; 13	WFD; 22	STA; 13	TMP; 27	RIV; 5	NHA; 18	MND; 14	STA; 23	TMP; 19	BRI; Wth	RIV; 23	OSW; 12	SEE; 11	NHA; 23	STA; 14	TMP; 10		16th	438	
2017	Judy Thilberg	36	Chevy	MYR; 24	TMP; 11	STA; 10	LGY; 14	TMP; 20	RIV; 2	NHA; 3	STA; 7	TMP; 16	BRI; 20	SEE; 5	OSW; 9	RIV; 14	NHA; 18	STA; 12	TMP; 8			7th	511	
2018	Judy Thilberg	36	Chevy	MYR; 6	TMP; 25	STA; 24	SEE; 9	TMP; 5	LGY; 19	RIV; 4	NHA; 13	STA; 29	TMP; 14	BRI; 7	OSW; 22	RIV; 5	NHA; 13	STA; 7	TMP; 26			8th	477	
2019	Judy Thilberg	36	Chevy	MYR; 15		TMP; 20										RIV; 23	NHA	STA	TMP			31st	153	
2019	Judy Thilberg	36	Dodge		SBO; 18		STA; 30	WAL; 5	SEE	TMP	RIV	NHA	STA	TMP	OSW							31st	153	
2020	Judy Thilberg	36	Chevy	JEN; 13	WMM; 6	WMM; 7	JEN; 2	MND; 11	TMP; 6	NHA; 20	STA; 21	TMP; 19										7th	292	
2021	Judy Thilberg	36	Chevy	MAR; 30	STA; 25	RIV; 10	JEN; 10	OSW	RIV; 21	NHA; 7	NRP	STA; 19	BEE	OSW	RCH; 26	RIV; 18	STA; 20					18th	254	
2022	Judy Thilberg	36	Chevy	NSM; 17	RCH; 16	RIV; 18	LEE; 13	JEN; 15	MND; 16	RIV; 18	WAL; 18	NHA; 24	CLM; 15	TMP; 23	LGY	OSW	RIV; 11	TMP; 12	MAR; 20			12th	380	
2023	Judy Thilberg	36	Chevy	NSM; 7	RCH; 14	MON; 30	RIV; 27	LEE	SEE; 12	RIV; 19	WAL; 10	NHA; 14	LMP	THO; 16	LGY	OSW	MON	RIV	NWS; 15	THO; 14	MAR; 25	16th	325	
2024	Judy Thilberg	36	Chevy	NSM; 16	RCH	THO; 23	MON	RIV	SEE	NHA	MON	LMP	THO; 21	OSW	RIV	MON	THO; 9	NWS	MAR			34th	107	
2025	Judy Thilberg	36	Chevy	NSM; 20	THO; Wth	NWS; 30	SEE; 17	RIV	WMM; Wth	LMP	MON; 19	MON; 14	THO; 15	RCH	OSW	NHA	RIV	THO	MAR			31st	120	
2026	Judy Thilberg	36	Chevy	NSM; DNQ	MAR; 31	THO; 16	SEE; 23	RIV	OXF; Wth	SEE; 17	CLM	WMM; Wth	MON; Wth	THO; 15	NHA; 8	STA; 25	OSW	RIV; 18	THO; 15			20th	228	

==== Whelen Southern Modified Tour ====
NASCAR Whelen Southern Modified Tour results
Year	Car owner	No.	Make	1	2	3	4	5	6	7	8	9	10	NSWMTC	Pts	Ref
2015	Jarod Zeltmann	36	Chevy	CRW	CRW	SBO	LGY	CRW	BGS	BRI; DNQ	LGY	SBO	CLT	N/A	0	
