= Doug Coby =

American racing driver

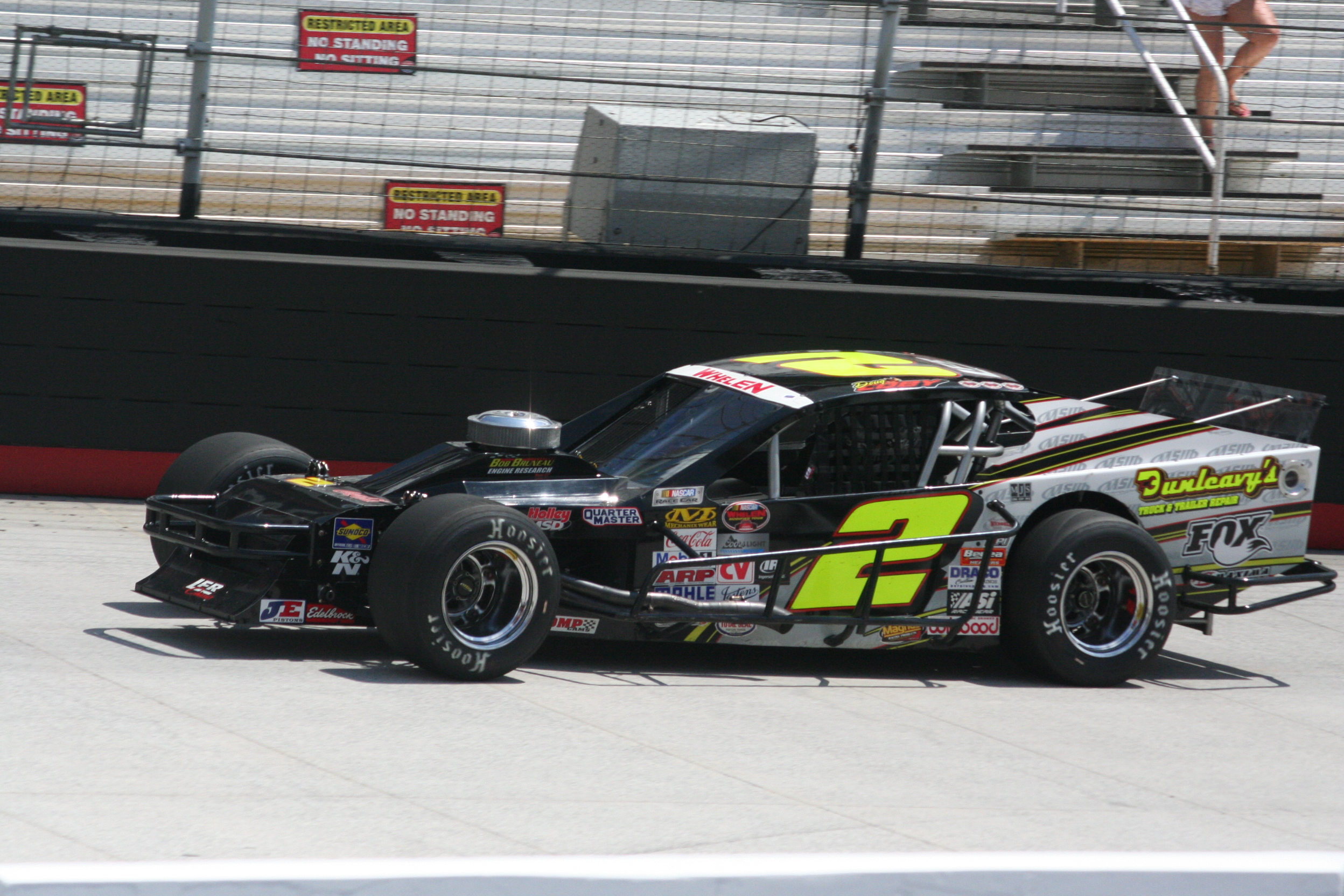
- Coby's No. 2 car at Bristol Motor Speedway in 2016
- Born: Frank Douglas Coby III; August 18, 1979 (age 47) Milford, Connecticut, U.S.

NASCAR Whelen Modified Tour career
- Debut season: 2002
- Current team: Jett Motorsports
- Car number: 28
- Engine: Chevrolet
- Crew chief: John McKenna
- Former teams: Mike Smeriglio Racing, Tommy Baldwin Racing, King Racing, Curt Chase Racing, Wayne Darling Racing, Major Motion Motorsports, Santos Racing, Solheim Racing, Berkeley Auto Racing, TS Haulers Motorsports
- Starts: 299
- Championships: 6
- Wins: 35
- Poles: 35
- Best finish: 1st in 2012, 2014, 2015, 2016, 2017, 2019
- Finished last season: 17th (2026)

Previous series
- 2015 2017: NASCAR Whelen Southern Modified Tour; NASCAR K&N Pro Series East

NASCAR FedEx Freight Truck Series career
- 1 race run over 1 year
- 2021 position: 62nd
- Best finish: 62nd (2021)
- First race: 2021 UNOH 200 (Bristol)
Wins	Top tens	Poles
0	0	0
- Statistics up to date as of October 12, 2026.

Frank Douglas Coby III (born August 18, 1979) is an American professional racing driver who competes part-time in the NASCAR Whelen Modified Tour, driving the No. 28 Chevrolet for Jett Motorsports. He has also competed part-time in the NASCAR Camping World Truck Series, driving the No. 24 Chevrolet Silverado for GMS Racing. He is a six-time champion of the Whelen Modified Tour, winning titles in 2012, 2014, 2015, 2016, 2017 and 2019.

== Racing career ==
Coby started racing in quarter midgets before moving up to pro stocks, late models and SK modifieds. He won two Whelen All-American Series championships at his home track, Stafford Motor Speedway. He has also dabbled in open-wheel midget racing.

In 2002, Coby debuted in the NASCAR Whelen Modified Tour at Stafford and ran part-time in the series for a number of years. He won his first NWMT race at Stafford in 2006 and continued to run part-time on the tour for the next half-decade, earning his second career win at Thompson Speedway Motorsports Park in 2011. He also ran in the Valenti Modified Racing Series during that time. The win at Thompson came with car owner Wayne Darling; Coby won his first NWMT championship with Darling in 2012 on the strength of five race wins.

The following year, Coby was second in points and decided to switch teams to Mike Smeriglio Racing for the 2014 season. He won his first race with the team, the Battle at the Beach, and claimed the 2014 NWMT championship.

In 2015, Coby entered the NWMT season finale at Thompson Speedway Motorsports Park tied with Ryan Preece atop the point standings after Coby had controversially spun Preece for a race win at New Hampshire Motor Speedway in the later stages of the season. Coby won the race and the championship after a mid-race pass on Justin Bonsignore for the lead. Also that year, he made his debut in the NASCAR Whelen Southern Modified Tour, driving a No. 21 car for Smeriglio in the season-opener at Caraway Speedway, finishing fifteenth.

For the 2016 season, Coby claimed nine NWMT pole awards and claimed his third consecutive tour championship, becoming the first driver in tour history to accomplish such a feat.

Following the first two races of the 2017 NASCAR Whelen Modified Tour season, Coby was 16th in the point standings but rallied to claim the championship by the end of the season. Also that year, he made his debut in the K&N Pro Series East race, driving the No. 43 for Calabrese Motorsports at Thompson Speedway Motorsports Park, finishing fourth.

In 2018, Coby finished third in the NWMT point standings while rival Justin Bonsignore won the championship. Coby won two races the following year and claimed his sixth title by nine points over Bonsignore. He also ran a limited stock car schedule, winning a feature at the World Series of Asphalt.

Coby won another NWMT championship in 2019, using a large accumulated points lead to withstand a flat tire suffered in the season finale. After the championship, Coby's car owner, Mike Smeriglio, decided to sell his team, leaving Coby without a ride. In the following offseason, Coby bought one of Smerigilio's three cars and started his own team, Doug Coby Racing with his crew chief, Phil Moran.

In 2021, it was announced Coby would compete in the inaugural Superstar Racing Experience race at Stafford Motor Speedway. (As a result, he skipped the Whelen Modified Tour race at Oswego Speedway, which was on the same day.) Driving a No. 10 car (the same number he uses in the Modified Tour), he won the second heat and the main event in front of the hometown crowd. This led to him getting a ride with GMS Racing in the NASCAR Camping World Truck Series at the Bristol night race in September. It would be his debut in NASCAR's top-three series. The deal came together through GMS Team President Mike Beam, who served as Coby's crew chief in the SRX race at Stafford.

Coby joined Tommy Baldwin Racing in 2022, winning in his first start with the team at Riverhead Raceway. He ran a partial schedule in the team's No. 7 for the remainder of the season, helping TBR win the owners' championship along with fellow drivers Jimmy Blewett and Mike Christopher Jr.

In 2023, TBR signed Coby to run the full schedule, but the team's season was interrupted when team owner Tommy Baldwin Jr. was diagnosed with cancer. Baldwin suspended the team's operations while undergoing treatment, though the team later returned in September for the race at Monadnock Speedway. Baldwin entered the 2024 season cancer-free, and Coby returned to the team for a part-time schedule.

While Baldwin's son, Luke Baldwin, began the 2025 season driving TBR's No. 7 entry, Coby returned to the seat at New Hampshire as a fill-in driver while Luke was in Virginia for a SMART Modified Tour race. Coby's engine failed six laps into the race, leaving him with a last-place finish in the 27-car field.

== Personal life ==
Outside of racing, Coby worked in financial services before founding Rescue Dog Realty, a real estate company that donates commission earnings to rescue shelters.

== Motorsports career results ==
=== NASCAR ===
(key) (Bold – Pole position awarded by qualifying time. Italics – Pole position earned by points standings or practice time. * – Most laps led.)

==== Camping World Truck Series ====
NASCAR Camping World Truck Series results
Year	Team	No.	Make	1	2	3	4	5	6	7	8	9	10	11	12	13	14	15	16	17	18	19	20	21	22	NCWTC	Pts	Ref
2021	GMS Racing	24	Chevy	DAY	DAY	LVS	ATL	BRI	RCH	KAN	DAR	COA	CLT	TEX	NAS	POC	KNX	GLN	GTW	DAR	BRI; 12	LVS	TAL	MAR	PHO	62nd	25	

==== K&N Pro Series East ====
NASCAR K&N Pro Series East results
Year	Team	No.	Make	1	2	3	4	5	6	7	8	9	10	11	12	13	14	NKNPSEC	Pts	Ref
2017	Calabrese Motorsports	43	Toyota	NSM	GRE	BRI	SBO	SBO	MEM	BLN	TMP; 4	NHA	IOW	GLN	LGY	NJM	DOV	42nd	40	

==== Whelen Modified Tour ====
NASCAR Whelen Modified Tour results
Year	Car owner	No.	Make	1	2	3	4	5	6	7	8	9	10	11	12	13	14	15	16	17	18	19	NWMTC	Pts	Ref
2002	Don King	28	Chevy	TMP	STA	WFD	NZH	RIV	SEE	RCH	STA	BEE	NHA	RIV	TMP	STA	WFD	TMP	NHA	STA; 19	MAR; 35	TMP; 26	59th	249	
2003	Don King	28	Chevy	TMP; 18	STA; DNQ	WFD; 28	NZH; 24	STA; DNQ	LER; 19	BLL; 17	BEE; 12	NHA; 23	ADI; 9	RIV; DNQ	TMP; 11	STA; 17	WFD; 9	TMP; 8	NHA; 12	STA; 18	TMP; 12		14th	1903	
2004	Don King	28	Chevy	TMP; 21	STA; 25	WFD; 14	NZH; 19	STA; 25	RIV; 9	LER; 23	BLL; 9	BEE; 16	NHA; 33	SEE; 17	RIV; 13	STA; 10	TMP; 16	WFD; 28	TMP; 19	NHA; 10	STA; 20		12th	2108	
2004	Curt Chase	77	Chevy																			TMP; 7	12th	2108	
2005	Curt Chase	77	Chevy	TMP; 9	STA; 24	RIV; 17		STA; 3*					RIV; 22										7th	2327	
2005	Curt Chase	77	Pontiac				WFD; 10		JEN; 12	NHA; 4	BEE; 14	SEE; 5		STA; 25	**TMP**; 14*	WFD; 2	MAR; 5	TMP; 19	**NHA**; 7	STA; 29	TMP; 3		7th	2327	
2006	Curt Chase	77	Pontiac	TMP; 16	STA; 1*	JEN; 9	TMP; 17	STA; 21	NHA; 33	HOL; 24	RIV; DNQ	STA; 20	TMP; 20	MAR; 5	TMP; 7	NHA; 33	WFD; 11	TMP; 23	STA; 13				14th	1792	
2007	Curt Chase	77	Pontiac	TMP	STA	WTO	STA	TMP	NHA	TSA	RIV	STA; 4	TMP; 19	MAN; 2	MAR; 17								37th	706	
2007	Mike Smeriglio III	22	Ford													NHA; 36	TMP	STA					37th	706	
2007	Don King	88	Chevy																TMP; 20				37th	706	
2008	Preece Racing	40	Chevy	TMP	STA	STA	TMP	NHA; DNQ	SPE	RIV													35th	694	
2008	Don King	28	Chevy								STA; 3	TMP	MAN	TMP; 3	NHA; 34	MAR	CHE	STA; 21	TMP; 4				35th	694	
2009	George Bierce Jr.	19	Chevy	**TMP**; 8	STA; 28	STA; 9	**NHA**; 6	SPE; 25	RIV; 22	STA; 28	BRI	TMP; 31	NHA; 11	MAR	STA; 2	TMP; 3							18th	1308	
2010	Ralph Solhem	0	Chevy	TMP; 37	STA; 22*	STA	MAR	NHA; 8															27th	1003	
2010	Robert Katon Jr.	46	Chevy						LIM; 20	MND	RIV												27th	1003	
2010	Bob Santos	92	Chevy									STA; 17	TMP; 8	BRI									27th	1003	
2010	Ed Partridge	12	Chevy												NHA; 4	STA							27th	1003	
2010	Wayne Darling	52	Chevy														TMP; 3						27th	1003	
2011	Wayne Darling	52	Chevy	TMP; 7	**STA**; 29	STA; 8	MND; 11	TMP; 7	NHA; 4	RIV; 5	**STA**; 9*	NHA; 10	BRI; 17	DEL; 2	TMP; 1*	LRP; 18	NHA; 16	STA; 9	TMP; 15*				5th	2214	
2012	Wayne Darling	52	Chevy	TMP; 8	STA; 1	MND; 2	STA; 1	WFD; 1*	NHA; 3	STA; 1*	TMP; 3	BRI; 11	TMP; 13	RIV; 22	NHA; 1	STA; 9	TMP; 6						1st	556	
2013	Wayne Darling	52	Chevy	TMP; 7	STA; 6	STA; 6	WFD; 2	RIV; 28	NHA; 1	MND; 2	STA; 1*	TMP; 4	BRI; 15	RIV; 14	NHA; 13	STA; 2	TMP; 8						2nd	517	
2014	Mike Smeriglio III	2	Chevy	TMP; 3	STA; 2	STA; 1*	WFD; 10	RIV; 6	NHA; 2	MND; 5	STA; 4	TMP; 3		NHA; 3	STA; 8	TMP; 17							1st	511	
2014	Mike Smeriglio III	2	Ford										BRI; 4										1st	511	
2015	Mike Smeriglio III	2	Chevy	**TMP**; 1*	STA; 6	WFD; 2	**STA**; 13	TMP; 1*	RIV; 3	**NHA**; 30	MND; 1*	STA; 2	TMP; 1*	BRI; 22	RIV; 2	**NHA**; 1*	**STA**; 1	**TMP**; 1*					1st	613	
2016	Mike Smeriglio III	2	Chevy	**TMP**; 4	**STA**; 1*	WFD; 8	**STA**; 1*	**TMP**; 11	**RIV**; 10*	NHA; 1*	MND; 6	**STA**; 20*	**TMP**; 2	BRI; 5	RIV; 15	OSW; 1*	**SEE**; 3*	NHA; 3	**STA**; 1*	TMP; 6			1st	684	
2017	Mike Smeriglio III	2	Chevy	MYR; 13	TMP; 31	**STA**; 2*	**LGY**; 15*	TMP; 4	RIV; 3	NHA; 11	STA; 2*	TMP; 2	BRI; 2	SEE; 1*	OSW; 4	RIV; 2	NHA; 14*	STA; 7	TMP; 5*				1st	604	
2018	Mike Smeriglio III	2	Chevy	MYR; 14	TMP; 6	STA; 21	SEE; 12	**TMP**; 3*	LGY; 24	RIV; 3	NHA; 26	STA; 1	TMP; 3	BRI; 5	OSW; 3	RIV; 4	NHA; 7	STA; 3	TMP; 6				3rd	575	
2019	Mike Smeriglio III	2	Chevy	**MYR**; 1	SBO; 8	**TMP**; 5*	STA; 1	WAL; 10*	**SEE**; 1*	**TMP**; 2	**RIV**; 8*	NHA; 2*	**STA**; 3*	**TMP**; 1*	OSW; 6	RIV; 15	**NHA**; 3	STA; 3	TMP; 7				1st	661	
2020	Doug Coby Racing	10	Chevy	JEN; 7	WMM; 3	WMM; 1	JEN; 4	MND; 3	**TMP**; 5*	NHA; 9	STA; 2	**TMP**; 22											3rd	347	
2021	Doug Coby Racing	10	Ford	MAR; 6	STA; 12		JEN; 2	OSW	RIV; 1*	NHA; 27	NRP; 9	STA; 4	BEE; 5	OSW; 4	RCH; 5	RIV; 24	STA; 2						5th	483	
2021	Doug Coby Racing	10	Chevy			RIV; 1																	5th	483	
2022	Tommy Baldwin Racing	7	Chevy	NSM	RCH	RIV; 1*	LEE; 1	JEN	MND; 5	RIV; 10	WAL	NHA; 7	CLM; 9		LGY; 1*	OSW; 7	RIV; 4						9th	460	
2022	Doug Coby Racing	10	Chevy											TMP; 3				TMP; 8*	MAR; 30				9th	460	
2023	Tommy Baldwin Racing	7	Chevy	NSM; 5	RCH; 13	MON; 1*	RIV; 19	**LEE**; 6	SEE; 2	RIV; 3	WAL; 6	NHA; 2	LMP; 7	THO; 8	LGY	OSW	MON; 5	RIV	NWS; 10	THO	MAR		6th	496	
2024	Tommy Baldwin Racing	7	Chevy	NSM; 3	RCH; 6	THO	MON	RIV; 15		NHA; 28	MON	LMP	THO; 16	OSW	RIV	MON	THO	NWS	MAR				18th	184	
2024	Lawney Tinio	44	Chevy						SEE; 14														18th	184	
2025	Tommy Baldwin Racing	7	Chevy	NSM	THO	NWS	SEE	RIV	WMM	LMP	MON	MON	THO	RCH	OSW	NHA; 27	RIV	THO	MAR				65th	17	
2026	Jett Motorsports	28	Chevy	NSM	MAR	THO; 18	SEE; 9	RIV	OXF	SEE; 14	CLM	WMM; 8	MON; 9	THO; 9	NHA; 14	STA; 13	OSW	RIV	THO; 14				17th	288	

==== Whelen Southern Modified Tour ====
NASCAR Whelen Southern Modified Tour results
Year	Car owner	No.	Make	1	2	3	4	5	6	7	8	9	10	NWSMTC	Pts	Ref
2015	Mike Smeriglio III	21	Chevy	CRW; 15	CRW	SBO	LGY	CRW	BGS	BRI	LGY	SBO	CLT	27th	29	

^{*} Season still in progress

=== Superstar Racing Experience ===
(key) * – Most laps led. ^{1} – Heat 1 winner. ^{2} – Heat 2 winner.

Superstar Racing Experience results
Year	No.	1	2	3	4	5	6	SRXC	Pts
2021	10	STA; 1*^{2}	KNX	ELD	IRP	SLG	NSV	13th	44

=== SMART Modified Tour ===
SMART Modified Tour results
Year	Car owner	No.	Make	1	2	3	4	5	6	7	8	9	10	11	12	13	14	SMTC	Pts	Ref
2024	Tommy Baldwin Racing	7	N/A	FLO	CRW	SBO; 3	TRI	ROU	HCY	FCS	CRW	JAC	CAR	CRW	DOM	SBO	NWS	44th	38	

^{*} Season still in progress
