= Brian Robie =

American racing driver

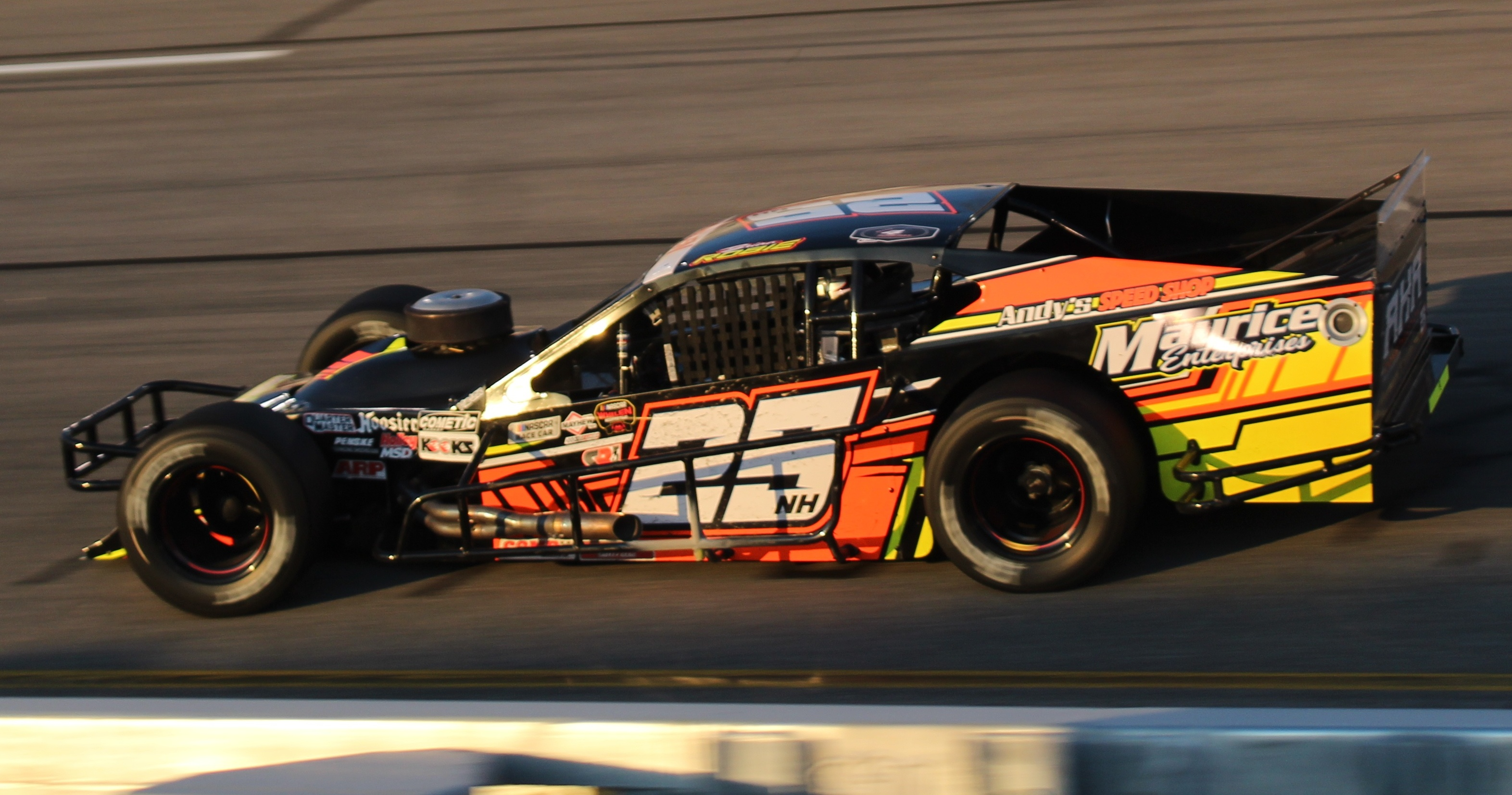
- Robie's No. 25 car at Richmond Raceway in 2024
- Nationality: American
- Born: February 25, 1988 (age 38) Sunapee, New Hampshire, U.S.

NASCAR Whelen Modified Tour career
- Debut season: 2022
- Years active: 2022–2025
- Starts: 18
- Championships: 0
- Wins: 0
- Poles: 0
- Best finish: 23rd in 2024, 2025
- Finished last season: 23rd (2025)
- Statistics up to date as of October 24, 2025.

Brian Robie (born February 25, 1988) is an American professional stock car racing driver who last competed part-time in the NASCAR Whelen Modified Tour, driving the No. 25 for Scott Spaulding.

Robie has previously competed in series such as the Modified Racing Series (where he was the 2021 series champion), the Tri-Track Open Modified Series, the Whitcomb 5 Series, the NHSTRA Modified Battle for the Cup, and the World Series of Asphalt Stock Car Racing.

== Motorsports results ==
=== NASCAR ===
(key) (Bold – Pole position awarded by qualifying time. Italics – Pole position earned by points standings or practice time. * – Most laps led.)

==== Whelen Modified Tour ====
NASCAR Whelen Modified Tour results
Year	Car owner	No.	Make	1	2	3	4	5	6	7	8	9	10	11	12	13	14	15	16	17	18	NWMTC	Pts	Ref
2022	Michael Smith	25	Chevy	NSM	RCH	RIV	LEE	JEN	MND; 23	RIV	WAL	NHA										40th	86	
2022	Kayleigh Eastman	25	Chevy										CLM; 8	TMP	LGY	OSW; 15	RIV	TMP	MAR			40th	86	
2023	Kayleigh Eastman	25	Chevy	NSM; 26	RCH	MON; 13	RIV	LEE; 11	SEE; 15	RIV	WAL	NHA	LMP	THO	LGY	OSW	MON; 8	RIV	NWS	THO	MAR	31st	147	
2024	Scott Spaulding	25	Chevy	NSM; 17	RCH; 16	THO; 12	MON; 7	RIV	SEE	NHA	MON; 11	LMP	THO	OSW	RIV	MON	THO	NWS	MAR			23rd	157	
2025	Scott Spaulding	25	Chevy	NSM; 12	THO	NWS	SEE; 18	RIV	WMM; 12	LMP	MON; 14	MON; 13	THO	RCH	OSW	NHA	RIV	THO	MAR			23rd	151	
