= Gary McDonald (racing driver) =

American racing driver

- Nationality: American
- Born: September 24, 1957 (age 69) Ronkonkoma, New York, U.S.

NASCAR Whelen Modified Tour career
- Debut season: 2007
- Years active: 2007–2019, 2021–2025
- Starts: 157
- Championships: 0
- Wins: 0
- Poles: 0
- Best finish: 13th in 2022
- Finished last season: 34th (2025)
- Statistics up to date as of October 24, 2025.

Gary McDonald (born September 24, 1957) is an American professional stock car racing driver who last competed part-time in the NASCAR Whelen Modified Tour, driving the No. 26 for Sean McDonald.

McDonald has also competed in series such as the Midwest Truck Series, the United States Super Trucks National Championship Series, and the Race of Champions Asphalt Modified Tour.

== Motorsports results ==
=== NASCAR ===
(key) (Bold – Pole position awarded by qualifying time. Italics – Pole position earned by points standings or practice time. * – Most laps led.)

==== Whelen Modified Tour ====
NASCAR Whelen Modified Tour results
Year	Car owner	No.	Make	1	2	3	4	5	6	7	8	9	10	11	12	13	14	15	16	17	18	NWMTC	Pts	Ref
2007	Sean McDonald	26	Chevy	TMP; DNQ	STA; DNQ	WTO	STA	TMP	NHA	TSA	RIV; DNQ	STA	TMP	MAN	MAR	NHA; 40	TMP	STA	TMP; DNQ			48th	209	
2008	Sean McDonald	26	Chevy	TMP; 39	STA	STA; DNQ	TMP; DNQ	NHA; 27	SPE	RIV; DNQ	STA; DNQ	TMP; 15	MAN	TMP; 23	NHA; 24	MAR	CHE	STA	TMP; DNQ			33rd	703	
2009	Sean McDonald	26	Chevy	TMP	STA; DNQ	STA; DNQ	NHA; 38		RIV; DNQ	STA; 22	BRI	TMP; 22	NHA; 23	MAR; 15	STA; 18	TMP; 21						25th	962	
2009	Sean McDonald	26	Pontiac					SPE; 16														25th	962	
2010	Sean McDonald	26	Pontiac	TMP; 25													TMP; 25					21st	1162	
2010	Sean McDonald	26	Chevy		STA; DNQ	STA; DNQ	MAR; 34	NHA; 21	LIM; 19	MND; 16	RIV; DNQ	STA; 20	TMP; 19	BRI	NHA; 15	STA; 25						21st	1162	
2011	Sean McDonald	26	Pontiac	TMP; 21	STA; 27	STA; 29	MND; 27	TMP; 23			STA; 24	NHA; 15	BRI; 19	DEL	TMP	LRP	NHA					25th	1140	
2011	Sean McDonald	26	Chevy						NHA; 25	RIV								STA; 18	TMP; 13			25th	1140	
2012	Sean McDonald	26	Chevy	TMP	STA; 25																	27th	126	
2012	Sean McDonald	26	Pontiac			MND; 19	STA; 22	WFD; 23	NHA; 24	STA; 25	TMP	BRI	TMP	RIV	NHA	STA	TMP					27th	126	
2013	Sean McDonald	26	Pontiac	TMP; 24	STA; 23	STA; 18	WFD; 19	RIV; 22	NHA; 31	MND; 18	STA; 24	TMP; 19	BRI	RIV; 19	NHA; 22	STA; 15	TMP					22nd	274	
2014	Sean McDonald	26	Chevy	TMP; DNQ									BRI; 19									18th	318	
2014	Sean McDonald	26	Pontiac		STA; 17	STA; 18	WFD; 18	RIV; 25	NHA; 21	MND; 15	STA; 20	TMP; 12		NHA; 14	STA; 17	TMP; 31						18th	318	
2015	Sean McDonald	26	Pontiac	TMP; 23	STA; 28	WAT; 29	STA; 23	TMP; 25	RIV; DNQ		MON; 24				RIV; 18							20th	296	
2015	Sean McDonald	26	Chevy							NHA; 20		STA; 21	TMP; 25	BRI		NHA; 16	STA; 17	TMP; 20				20th	296	
2016	Sean McDonald	26	Chevy	TMP; 22	STA; 22	WFD; 12	STA; 20	TMP; 13	RIV; 26	NHA; 26	MND; 19	STA; 19	TMP; 24	BRI; 17	RIV; 13	OSW; 18	SEE; 21	NHA; 18	STA; 24	TMP; 16		18th	418	
2017	Sean McDonald	26	Chevy	MYR	THO; 26	STA; Wth	LGY	THO	RIV; 26	NHA; Wth	STA; 16	THO; Wth	BRI	SEE; 9	OSW	RIV; 20	NHA; Wth	STA; 21	THO; 31			29th	159	
2018	Sean McDonald	26	Chevy	MYR; 17	TMP; 17	STA; 23	SEE; 18	TMP; 24	LGY; 17	RIV; 27	NHA; 21	STA; 17	TMP; 22	BRI; 16	OSW; 21	RIV; 19	NHA; 27	STA; 21	TMP; 33			16th	364	
2019	Sean McDonald	26	Chevy	MYR; Wth	SBO; Wth	TMP	STA	WAL	SEE	TMP	RIV; Wth	NHA	STA; Wth	TMP	OSW	RIV; 30	NHA	STA; 23	TMP; 24			50th	55	
2021	Sean McDonald	26	Chevy	MAR; 20	STA; 23	RIV; 25	JEN	OSW	RIV; 18	NHA	NRP	STA	BEE	OSW	RCH	RIV	STA; 25					30th	109	
2022	Sean McDonald	26	Chevy	NSM; 24	RCH; 22	RIV; 22	LEE; 18	JEN; 20	MND; 21	RIV	WAL; 20	NHA; 18	CLM; 18	TMP; 17	LGY; 17	OSW; 21	RIV; 20	TMP; 21	MAR; 25			13th	356	
2023	Sean McDonald	26	Chevy	NSM; 22	RCH; 22	MON; 23	RIV; 20	LEE	SEE	RIV	WAL	NHA	LMP; 15	THO	LGY; 14	OSW; 12	MON	RIV; 13	NWS; 29	THO	MAR	21st	226	
2024	Sean McDonald	26	Chevy	NSM; 22	RCH; 19	THO	MON	RIV; 20	SEE	NHA; 24	MON	LMP	THO	OSW	RIV	MON	THO	NWS	MAR			41st	91	
2025	Sean McDonald	26	Chevy	NSM; 24	THO; Wth	NWS	SEE	RIV; 21	WMM	LMP; 20	MON; 24	MON; Wth	THO	RCH	OSW	NHA	RIV; 17	THO	MAR			34th	114	
