= 2015 NASCAR Whelen Modified Tour =

The 2015 NASCAR Whelen Modified Tour was the thirty-first season of the Whelen Modified Tour (WMT). It began with the Icebreaker 150 at Thompson Speedway Motorsports Park on April 12 and concluded at the same venue with the Sunoco World Series 150 on October 18.

Defending champion Doug Coby won his third series title, and as a result, became the first driver since Tony Hirschman Jr. to win successive Whelen Modified Tour championships. Coby was the season's most prolific winner – with seven victories – including the final three races which allowed him to overhaul Ryan Preece in the standings, with Coby ultimately prevailing by eleven points after entering the final race tied on points with Preece. Preece was a four-time race winner, and finished all but one race inside the top-ten placings. Just like Preece, Woody Pitkat recorded fourteen top-ten finishes out of fifteen starts – winning at Stafford along with the non-championship Shootout at New Hampshire – as he finished third in points, two down on Preece and thirteen behind Coby. The only other drivers to win races during the season were Todd Szegedy at New Hampshire and Justin Bonsignore, who swept both races at his local track, Riverhead Raceway.

== Drivers ==
No.	Manufacturer	Car Owner	Race Driver	Crew Chief
0	Chevrolet	Joe Ambrose	Tom Rogers Jr. 2	Helmut Loschnig
01	Chevrolet	Kenneth Fifield	Melissa Fifield	Kenneth Fifield
2	Chevrolet	Mike Smeriglio III	Doug Coby	Phil Moran
3	Chevrolet	Jan Boehler	Troy Talman (R) 10	Greg Fournier
3	Chevrolet	Jan Boehler	Derek Ramstrom (R) 1	Rick Ramstrom
3	Chevrolet	Jan Boehler	Kyle Bonsignore (R) 1	Bill Bonsignore
4	Dodge	Robert Garbarino	Todd Szegedy (Note: At the Bush's Beans 150 at Bristol, some WMT and WSMT drivers had to change numbers to avoid clashing with the other Modified Tour championship. WMT drivers who had to change numbers: Todd Szegedy drove car number 41, instead of his regular car number 4, Ron Silk drove car number 05, instead of his regular car number 15 and Joe Ryan Osborne drove car number 19, instead of his regular car number 79.)	Ryan Spaulding
5	Chevrolet	Raymond Bouchard	Frank Vigliarolo Jr. 2	Raymond Bouchard
06	Chevrolet	Michelle Biondolillo	Vincent Biondolillo (R) 1	Jarred Hayes
6	Chevrolet	Ed Partridge	Ryan Preece	Tommy Grasso
07	Chevrolet	Jennifer Emerling	Patrick Emerling	Jan Leaty
7	Chevrolet	Mike Curb	Ryan Newman 3	Teddy Musgrave Jr.
8	Chevrolet	Mark Sypher	Donny Lia	Dan Laferriere
9	Chevrolet	Cheryl Tomaino	Chase Dowling (R)	Don Barker
11	Chevrolet	Grant Williams	Chuck Steuer 1	Butch Capuano
11	Chevrolet	William Deakin	John Beatty Jr. (R) 1	Glenn Dixon
13	Chevrolet	Robert Katon Jr.	Ted Christopher 8	Bob Fill
13	Chevrolet	Robert Katon Jr.	Andy Seuss 2	Bob Fill
13	Chevrolet	Robert Katon Jr.	Johnny Bush 1	Michael Loomis
13	Chevrolet	Robert Katon Jr.	James Civali 4	Bob Fill
14	Chevrolet	Ken Zachem	Max Zachem (R)	Shawn Ruszczyk
15	Chevrolet	Rob Fuller	Corey LaJoie 2	Jeff DeMinck
15	Chevrolet	Rob Fuller	Ron Silk 4	Ryan Stone
15	Chevrolet	Rob Fuller	Ray Graham (R) 1	Ryan Stone
16	Ford	Eric Sanderson	Timmy Solomito	Sly Szaban
17	Chevrolet	John Ellwood Jr.	Kyle Ellwood (R) 5	Rico Mariani
18	Chevrolet	Robert Pollifrone	Ken Heagy 14	Greg Gorman
19	Chevrolet	Karen Oltra	Brandon Oltra (R) 3	Steve Kreitzer
20	Chevrolet	Barbara Park	Ron Silk 2	Dave Wheeler
22	Chevrolet	Christopher Our	Tommy Barrett Jr. 1	Brad Lafontaine
22	Chevrolet	Christopher Our	Keith Rocco 7	Brad Lafontaine
22	Chevrolet	Christopher Our	Ted Christopher 5	Brad Lafontaine
26	Chevrolet 10	Sean McDonald	Gary McDonald 14	Chad McDonald
26	Pontiac 4	Sean McDonald	Gary McDonald 14	Chad McDonald
28	Ford	George Bock	Brendon Bock (R) 1	Glenn Dixon
29	Chevrolet 2	Jon McKennedy	Jon McKennedy 2	Peter Frappier
29	Ford 7	George Bock	Brendon Bock (R) 8	Glenn Dixon
29	Chevrolet 1	George Bock	Brendon Bock (R) 8	Glenn Dixon
31	Chevrolet	Pete Masse	Steve Masse (R) 9	Josh Steeves
33	Chevrolet	Wade Cole	Johnny Bush 3	Rick Rodenbaugh
33	Chevrolet	Wade Cole	Wade Cole 12	Rick Rodenbaugh
35	Chevrolet	Wayne Darling	Derek Ramstrom (R) 3	Rick Ramstrom
36	Chevrolet	Jarod Zeltmann	Dave Sapienza (R)	Jarod Zeltmann
37	Chevrolet	Cynthia Richey	Dave Salzarulo 10	Marty Radewick
38	Chevrolet	Linda Rodenbaugh	Wade Cole 1	Jake Marosz
38	Chevrolet	Linda Rodenbaugh	George Perreault (R) 1	Jake Marosz
40	Chevrolet	Monica Fuller	Ron Silk 2	Ryan Stone
41	Chevrolet	Tom Soper	Kyle Soper (R) 1	Tom Soper
44	Chevrolet	Mike Curb	Bobby Santos III 14	Steve Lemay
46	Chevrolet	Russell Goodale	Jeff Goodale (R)	Doug Ogiejko
51	Chevrolet	Ken Massa	Justin Bonsignore	Bill Michael
56	Chevrolet	Renee Lutz	Craig Lutz (R) 3	Jason Seachrist
57	Chevrolet	Mark Pane	Keith Rocco 1	Stash Butova
58	Chevrolet	Edgar Goodale	Eric Goodale	Jason Shephard
59	Chevrolet	Ed Bennett III	Jerry Solomito Jr. (R) 2	Jerry Solomito Sr.
59	Chevrolet	Ted Christopher	Ronnie Williams (R) 1	Stash Butova
63	Chevrolet	Bill Darrow	Tom Rogers Jr. 4	Mike Curtis
64	Chevrolet	Mike Murphy	Anthony Nocella (R) 12	Steve Dodge
68	Chevrolet	Charlene Bush	Johnny Bush 2	Michael Loomis
69	Chevrolet	Jason Blatz	Jason Agugliaro (R) 1	Jason Blatz
70	Chevrolet	Steve Seuss	Andy Seuss 2	Steve Seuss
73	Chevrolet	Paul Hartwig	Paul Hartwig Jr. (R) 1	Lisa Hartwig
73	Chevrolet	Todd Powell	Cole Powell 1	Seth Smith
75	Chevrolet	Wayne Anderson	Shawn Solomito 14	Jerry Solomito Sr.
75	Chevrolet	Wayne Anderson	Jerry Solomito Jr. (R) 1	Butch Capuano
77	Chevrolet	Mike Curb	Gary Putnam 2	Mike Hann
79	Pontiac 8	Susan Hill	Spencer Davis 5	David Hill
79	Pontiac 8	Susan Hill	James Civali 1	David Hill
79	Pontiac 8	Susan Hill	Joe Ryan Osborne 2	David Hill
79	Chevrolet 2	Susan Hill	Troy Talman (R) 1	David Hill
79	Chevrolet 2	Susan Hill	Joe Ryan Osborne 1	David Hill
82	Chevrolet	Pamla Hulse	Danny Watts Jr. 5	Buddy Loecher
83	Chevrolet	Linda Rodenbaugh	Tom Rogers Jr. 1	Helmut Losching
87	Chevrolet	Keri Brunnhoelzl	Ed Brunnhoelzl III (R) 1	Russell Savoy
88	Chevrolet	Buzz Chew	Woody Pitkat (Note: At the F. W. Webb 100 Woody Pitkat drove with car number 38 instead of his regular 88 as a tribute to NASCAR Hall of Fame-elect Jerry Cook.)	Ronald Ste-Marie
89	Chevrolet	John Swanson	Matt Swanson (R) 5	Ken Barry
93	Chevrolet	Mark Pennink	Rowan Pennink 13	Jimmy Fuller
99	Chevrolet	Brittany Tomaino	Jamie Tomaino	George Ratajczak

== Schedule ==
The Whelen All-Star Shootout did not count towards the championship. 10 races from the 2015 season were televised on NBCSN, on a tape-delay basis.

No.	Race title	Track	Date	TV
1	Icebreaker 150	Thompson Speedway Motorsports Park, Thompson, Connecticut	April 12	NBCSN
2	NAPA Spring Sizzler 200	Stafford Motor Speedway, Stafford, Connecticut	April 26	
3	Mr. Rooter 161	Waterford Speedbowl, Waterford, Connecticut	May 30	
4	TSI Harley-Davidson 125	Stafford Motor Speedway, Stafford, Connecticut	June 5	
5	Mr. Rooter 125	Thompson Speedway Motorsports Park, Thompson, Connecticut	June 10	NBCSN
6	Hoosier Tire East 200	Riverhead Raceway, Riverhead, New York	June 28 (Note: The Riverhead Hoosier Tire East 200 was originally scheduled for June 27, but was postponed to June 28 due to heavy rain.)	NBCSN
	Whelen All-Star Shootout	New Hampshire Motor Speedway, Loudon, New Hampshire	July 17	NBCSN
7	Andy Blacksmith 100 presented by Donate Life New England	New Hampshire Motor Speedway, Loudon, New Hampshire	July 18	NBCSN
8	O'Reilly Auto Parts 200	Monadnock Speedway, Winchester, New Hampshire	July 25	NBCSN
9	Call Before You Dig 150	Stafford Motor Speedway, Stafford, Connecticut	August 7	
10	Budweiser King of Beers 150	Thompson Speedway Motorsports Park, Thompson, Connecticut	August 12	FansChoice.TV
11	Bush's Beans 150 (Note: The Bush's Beans 150 was held as a combined event, with competitors from the Whelen Modified Tour competing along with competitors for the Whelen Southern Modified Tour. The race was run with a series-based point distribution, where drivers received points and statistical credit for their finish relative to other drivers in their series, not to the whole field in general.)	Bristol Motor Speedway, Bristol, Tennessee	August 19	NBCSN
12	Riverhead 200	Riverhead Raceway, Riverhead, New York	August 29	
13	F. W. Webb 100	New Hampshire Motor Speedway, Loudon, New Hampshire	September 26	NBCSN
14	NAPA Fall Final 150	Stafford Motor Speedway, Stafford, Connecticut	October 4	NBCSN
15	Sunoco World Series 150	Thompson Speedway Motorsports Park, Thompson, Connecticut	October 18	NBCSN

== Results and standings ==
=== Races ===
No.	Race	Pole position	Most laps led	Winning driver	Manufacturer
1	Icebreaker 150	Doug Coby	Doug Coby	Doug Coby	Chevrolet
2	NAPA Spring Sizzler 200	Ryan Preece	Ryan Preece	Woody Pitkat	Chevrolet
3	Mr. Rooter 161	Donny Lia	Ryan Preece	Ryan Preece	Chevrolet
4	TSI Harley-Davidson 125	Doug Coby	Ryan Preece	Ryan Preece	Chevrolet
5	Mr. Rooter 125	Woody Pitkat	Doug Coby	Doug Coby	Chevrolet
6	Hoosier Tire East 200	Tom Rogers Jr.	Justin Bonsignore	Justin Bonsignore	Chevrolet
	Whelen All-Star Shootout	Eric Goodale^{1}	Woody Pitkat	Woody Pitkat	Chevrolet
7	Andy Blacksmith 100 presented by Donate Life New England	Doug Coby	Ryan Preece	Todd Szegedy	Dodge
8	O'Reilly Auto Parts 200	Ryan Preece	Doug Coby	Doug Coby	Chevrolet
9	Call Before You Dig 150	Patrick Emerling	Ryan Preece	Ryan Preece	Chevrolet
10	Budweiser King of Beers 150	Patrick Emerling	Doug Coby	Doug Coby	Chevrolet
11	Bush's Beans 150	Woody Pitkat	Woody Pitkat	Ryan Preece	Chevrolet
12	Riverhead 200	Tom Rogers Jr.	Justin Bonsignore	Justin Bonsignore	Chevrolet
13	F. W. Webb 100	Doug Coby	Doug Coby	Doug Coby	Chevrolet
14	NAPA Fall Final 150	Doug Coby	Ryan Preece	Doug Coby	Chevrolet
15	Sunoco World Series 150	Doug Coby	Doug Coby	Doug Coby	Chevrolet

Notes

- ^{1} – There was no qualifying session for the Whelen All-Star Shootout. The starting grid was decided with a random draw.

=== Drivers' championship ===
(key) Bold - Pole position awarded by time. Italics - Pole position set by final practice results or rainout. * – Most laps led.

Pos	Driver	THO	STA	WAT	STA	THO	RIV	NHA‡	NHA	MON	STA	THO	BRI	RIV	NHA	STA	THO	Points
1	Doug Coby	**1***	6	2	**13**	1*	3	20	**30**	1*	2	1*	34	2	**1***	**1**	**1***	613
2	Ryan Preece	5	**3***	1*	1*	7	8	2	6*	**10**	1*	6	1	8	19	2*	7	602
3	Woody Pitkat	2	1	5	2	**5**	5	1*	7	2	3	2	**2***	7	10	12	5	600
4	Todd Szegedy	10	2	19	4	3	2	11	1	4	16	3	35	9	20	10	4	535
5	Patrick Emerling	11	8	7	9	12	16	15	4	16	**6**	**7**	10	13	2	22	6	515
6	Timmy Solomito	6	16	12	3	9	6	17	12	21	7	10	9	19	12	3	3	514
7	Donny Lia	8	5	**21**	25	20	23	3	2	12	26	5	3	4	6	4	10	490
8	Eric Goodale	7	4	11	26	8	4	7	8	6	8	4	28	5	28	14	23	486
9	Chase Dowling **(R)**	17	32	16	12	17	13		10	9	10	11	8	3	8	6	9	481
10	Justin Bonsignore	27	20	25	28	2	1*	4	22	3	5	8	36	1*	5	21	2	478
11	Bobby Santos III	3	11	6	5	6	20	5	3	22	9	23	5		3	20	16	467
12	Max Zachem **(R)**	31	21	4	19	16	14		14	13	13	17	14	12	30	11	15	418
13	Ted Christopher	4	24	3	6	10	11	6	31		4	9	13		21	19	8	414
14	Jamie Tomaino	16	9	33	17	22	21	19	16	11	19	20	24	22	14	8	18	397
15	Jeff Goodale **(R)**	22	23	15	18	21	DNQ^{1}		32	23	12	22	7	10	7	23	11	386
16	Shawn Solomito	32	17	18	15		18		29	7	11	28	18	20	17	5	13	373
17	Dave Sapienza **(R)**	21	18	13	20	19	10		15	20	14	26	DNQ^{1}	23	9	26	32	369
18	Rowan Pennink	13	7	8	7	13	25	16	24	14	20	19	22	11	32			364
19	Ken Heagy	30	15	26	21		24	18	21	19	24	21	23	14	13	9	19	344
20	Gary McDonald	23	28	29	23	25	DNQ^{1}		20	24	21	25		18	16	17	20	296
21	Troy Talman **(R)**	20	14	20	16	15	22		25	5	25	16			29			277
22	Wade Cole			30	29	23	DNQ^{1}		18	18	18	24	DNQ^{1}	24	25	15	29	263
23	Keith Rocco		12	10	8	4	15	12	9	28							12	254
24	Anthony Nocella **(R)**	26	26	31	24	26	DNQ^{1}		26	26			12		34	13	14	240
25	Melissa Fifield	29	29	32	30	28	DNQ^{1}		23	27	22	29	DNQ^{1}	27	31	27	25	239
26	Brendon Bock **(R)**		10	22	27	18	17		13	15	23		33					231
27	Dave Salzarulo	24	27	17	22	29		14	17		17	30			18	25		214
28	Ron Silk	9				27	27	8	5			27	28	28	4			199
29	Tom Rogers Jr.	14	31	23	10		**7**							**6**	33			185
30	Steve Masse **(R)**	33	25	24	11				33	25		12				18	31	184
31	Matt Swanson **(R)**										15	15			24	7	27	132
32	Derek Ramstrom **(R)**	15		14		11						14						122
33	Johnny Bush	34	19	28					19				29	26				119
34	Kyle Ellwood **(R)**		33		14		12							16			28	117
35	Spencer Davis	12	30	9	31	24												114
36	Andy Seuss							10	27	8		13	6^{3}		15			113
37	James Civali						28						11^{3}	15	27	16	26	108
38	Craig Lutz **(R)**											18		21	11		21	105
39	Ryan Newman							9	11				4		26			91
40	Danny Watts Jr.	35					DNQ^{1}							Wth^{4}	22		24	74
41	Joe Ryan Osborne								34	17			19					67
42	Jerry Solomito Jr. **(R)**					30	19							17				66
43	Brandon Oltra **(R)**	25	22												23			62
44	Gary Putnam		13					13	28				20^{3}					47
45	Corey LaJoie	28				14												46
46	Jon McKennedy	18		27														43
47	Vincent Biondolillo **(R)**						9											35
48	Frank Vigliarolo Jr.						26							Wth^{4}				33
49	Kyle Soper **(R)**																17	27
50	Tommy Barrett Jr.	19																25
51	Kyle Bonsignore **(R)**												32					24
52	John Beatty Jr. **(R)**																22	22
53	Ronnie Williams **(R)**															24		20
54	Ed Brunnhoelzl III **(R)**													25				19
55	Chuck Steuer													Wth^{4}				14
56	Ray Graham **(R)**																30	14
57	Paul Hartwig Jr. **(R)**						DNQ^{1}											11
58	George Perreault **(R)**																DNQ^{1}	11
59	Cole Powell								DNS^{2}									9
	Jason Agugliaro **(R)**													Wth				
Drivers ineligible for Whelen Modified Tour points
	George Brunnhoelzl III												15					
	Frank Fleming												16					
	Jason Myers												17					
	Jeremy Gerstner												21					
	Bobby Measmer Jr.												25					
	Kyle Ebersole												26					
	David Calabrese												27					
	Burt Myers												30					
	J. R. Bertuccio												31					
	Cale Gale												DNQ					
	Tom Abele Jr.												DNQ					
	Trey Hutchens **(R)**												Wth					
Pos	Driver	THO	STA	WAT	STA	THO	RIV	NHA‡	NHA	MON	STA	THO	BRI	RIV	NHA	STA	THO	Points

Notes

- ^{‡} – Non-championship round.
- ^{1} – Wade Cole, Melissa Fifield, Jeff Goodale, Paul Hartwig Jr., Gary McDonald, Anthony Nocella, George Perreault, Dave Sapienza, and Danny Watts Jr. received championship points, despite the fact that they did not qualify for the race.
- ^{2} – Cole Powell received championship points, despite the fact that he did not start the race.
- ^{3} – Scored points towards the Whelen Southern Modified Tour.
- ^{4} – Chuck Steuer, Frank Vigliarolo Jr. and Danny Watts Jr. received championship points, despite the fact that they did not qualify for the race.

== See also ==
- 2015 NASCAR Sprint Cup Series
- 2015 NASCAR Xfinity Series
- 2015 NASCAR Camping World Truck Series
- 2015 NASCAR K&N Pro Series East
- 2015 NASCAR K&N Pro Series West
- 2015 NASCAR Whelen Southern Modified Tour
- 2015 NASCAR Canadian Tire Series
- 2015 NASCAR Mexico Series
- 2015 NASCAR Whelen Euro Series
