= Timmy Solomito =

American racing driver

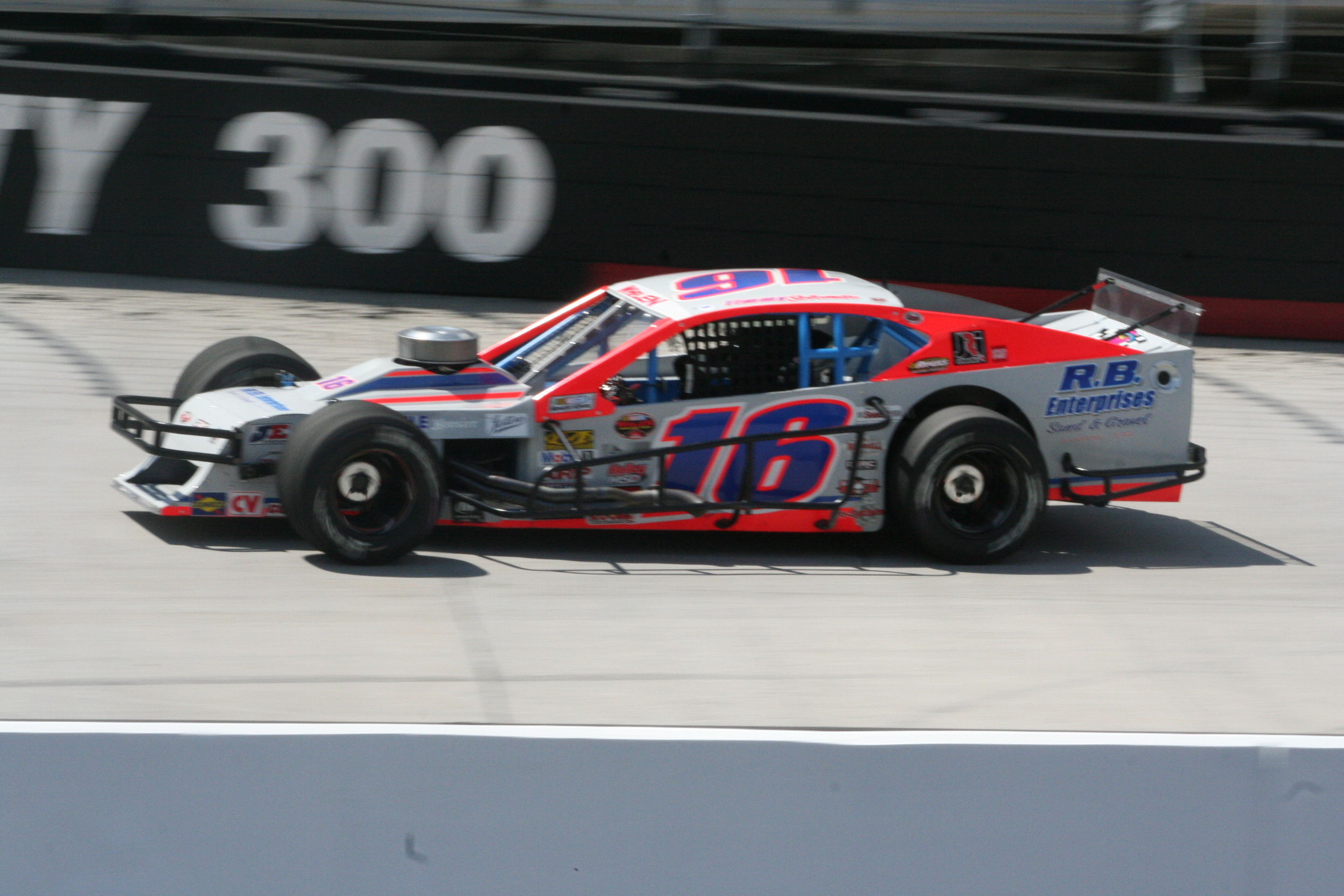
- Solomito's No. 16 car at Bristol Motor Speedway in 2016
- Nationality: American
- Born: December 3, 1991 (age 34) Islip, New York, U.S.

NASCAR Whelen Modified Tour career
- Debut season: 2011
- Current team: Jerry Solomito Sr.
- Years active: 2011–present
- Car number: 66
- Crew chief: Jerry Solomito Sr.
- Starts: 133
- Championships: 0
- Wins: 9
- Poles: 7
- Best finish: 2nd in 2017
- Finished last season: 32nd (2026)
- Statistics up to date as of October 12, 2026.

Timmy Solomito (born December 3, 1991) is an American professional stock car racing driver who competes part-time in the NASCAR Whelen Modified Tour, driving the No. 66 for Jerry Solomito Sr. He is the younger brother of fellow driver Shawn Solomito, who also competed in the Modified Tour.

Solomito is long-time competitor of the series, having made his debut in 2011, and has since won nine races and five pole positions.

Solomito has also competed in the now defunct NASCAR Whelen Southern Modified Tour, as well as the Modified Racing Series, the Allison Legacy Race Series, the Indoor Auto Racing Championship, and the World Series of Asphalt Stock Car Racing.

== Motorsports results ==
=== NASCAR ===
(key) (Bold – Pole position awarded by qualifying time. Italics – Pole position earned by points standings or practice time. * – Most laps led.)

==== Whelen Modified Tour ====
NASCAR Whelen Modified Tour results
Year	Car owner	No.	Make	1	2	3	4	5	6	7	8	9	10	11	12	13	14	15	16	17	18	NWMTC	Pts	Ref
2011	Eddie Whelan	66	Chevy	TMP	STA	STA	MND	TMP	NHA	RIV	STA	NHA	BRI	DEL	TMP	LRP	NHA	STA	TMP; 33			57th	64	
2013	Jerry Solomito	89	Chevy	TMP; 10	STA	STA; 27	WFD				STA; 19	TMP	BRI				TMP; 11					26th	173	
2013	Wayne Anderson	15	Chevy					RIV; 23	NHA	MND												26th	173	
2013	Rob Fuller	15	Chevy											**RIV**; 3*	NHA	STA						26th	173	
2014	Jerry Solomito	89	Chevy	TMP; 4																		8th	433	
2014	Wayne Anderson	75	Chevy		STA; 8	STA; 13	WFD; 21	RIV; 5	NHA; 11	MND; 13	STA; 11	TMP; 6	BRI; 8	NHA; 17	STA; 13	TMP; 10						8th	433	
2015	Eric Sanderson	16	Chevy	TMP; 6	STA; 16																	6th	514	
2015	Eric Sanderson	16	Ford			WFD; 12	STA; 3	TMP; 9	RIV; 6	NHA; 12	MND; 21	STA; 7	TMP; 10	BRI; 8	RIV; 19	NHA; 12	STA; 3	TMP; 3				6th	514	
2016	Eric Sanderson	16	Ford	TMP; 1	STA; 4	WFD; 15	STA; 23	TMP; 15	RIV; 1	NHA; 12	**MND**; 1**	STA; 8	TMP; 12	BRI; 19	RIV; 2	OSW; 2	SEE; 1	NHA; 9	STA; 2	**TMP**; 5*		3rd	638	
2017	Eric Sanderson	16	Ford	MYR; 1	**TMP**; 2	STA; 11	LGY; 1	TMP; 8	**RIV**; 1*	NHA; 29	STA; 4	TMP; 4	BRI; 15	SEE; 22	OSW; 3	**RIV**; 1	NHA; 24	STA; 5	TMP; 1			2nd	598	
2018	Eric Sanderson	16	Ford	MYR; 12	TMP; 10	STA; 9	SEE; 7	TMP; 6	LGY; 4	RIV; 5	NHA; 17	STA; 5	TMP; 10	BRI; 15	OSW; 8	RIV; 2*	NHA; 18	STA; 9	TMP; 28			4th	545	
2019	Eric Sanderson	16	Ford	MYR; 28	SBO; 9	TMP; 15	STA; 9	WAL; 25	SEE; 5	TMP; 13	RIV; 3	NHA; 11	STA; 25	TMP; 5	OSW; 8	RIV; 2			TMP; 10			7th	513	
2019	Eric Sanderson	x6	Ford														NHA; 13	STA; 13				7th	513	
2020	Jerry Solomito	66	Chevy	JEN; 15	WMM; 29	WMM; 17			TMP; 22	NHA	STA; 11	TMP; 26										23rd	144	
2020	Jerry Solomito	66	Ford				JEN; Wth	MND														23rd	144	
2021	Jerry Solomito	66	Chevy	MAR	STA; 4	RIV; Wth										RIV; 7	STA; 11					13th	326	
2021	KLM Motorsports	64	Chevy			RIV; 12																13th	326	
2021	KLM Motorsports	64	Toyota				JEN; 13	OSW; 13	RIV; 19	NHA; 10	NRP; 11	STA; 14	BEE; Wth	OSW	RCH							13th	326	
2022	Jerry Solomito	66	Chevy	NSM	RCH	RIV; 5	LEE			RIV; 8*	WAL; 23	NHA	CLM				RIV; 8	TMP	MAR			20th	201	
2022	Boehler Racing Enterprises	3	Chevy					JEN; 14	MND													20th	201	
2022	Russell Goodale	46	Chevy											TMP; 8	LGY	OSW						20th	201	
2023	Jerry Solomito	66	Chevy	NSM	RCH	MON	RIV; 11	LEE	SEE	RIV; 9	WAL	NHA	LMP	THO	LGY	OSW	MON	RIV; 6	NWS	THO	MAR	36th	106	
2024	Edgar Goodale	58	Chevy	NSM	RCH	THO	MON; 11	RIV; 25	SEE; 19	NHA	MON	LMP	THO	OSW								29th	119	
2024	Jerry Solomito Sr.	66	Chevy												RIV; 6	MON	THO	NWS	MAR			29th	119	
2025	Jerry Solomito Sr.	66	Chevy	NSM	THO	NWS	SEE	RIV	WMM	LMP	MON	MON	THO	RCH	OSW	NHA	RIV	THO; 22	MAR			62nd	22	
2026	Jerry Solomito Sr.	66	Chevy	NSM; 26	MAR; 9	THO	SEE	RIV; Wth	OXF	SEE	CLM	WMM	MON	THO	NHA	STA	OSW	RIV; 7	THO			32nd	90	

==== Whelen Southern Modified Tour ====
NASCAR Whelen Southern Modified Tour results
Year	Car owner	No.	Make	1	2	3	4	5	6	7	8	9	10	11	12	13	14	NWSMTC	Pts	Ref
2011	Joseph Bertuccio	2	Chevy	CRW	HCY	SBO	CRW	CRW	BGS	BRI	CRW	LGY	THO; 7	TRI	CRW	CLT	CRW	32nd	146	
