= 2015 NASCAR Whelen Southern Modified Tour =

The 2015 NASCAR Whelen Southern Modified Tour was the eleventh season of the NASCAR Whelen Southern Modified Tour (WSMT). It began with the Spring Classic 150 at Caraway Speedway on March 15 and ended with the Charlotte 150 at Charlotte Motor Speedway on October 8. Andy Seuss, who entered the season as the defending drivers champion, won the championship, three points in front of George Brunnhoelzl III. Five races during the season were televised in the United States on NBCSN by a tape-delay.

== Drivers ==
| No. | Manufacturer | Car Owner | Race Driver | Crew Chief |
|---|---|---|---|---|
| 1 | Ford 8 | Kim Myers | Burt Myers | Matt Cromer |
| 1 | Chevrolet 2 | Kim Myers | Burt Myers | Matt Cromer |
| 2 | Chevrolet | Joe Bertuccio Sr. | J. R. Bertuccio (Note: At the Bush's Beans 150 at Bristol, some WMT and WSMT drivers had to change numbers to avoid clashing with the other Modified Tour championship. The WSMT driver who had to change his number was J. R. Bertuccio, who drove car number 21, instead of his regular car number 2.) 7 | Joe Bertuccio Sr. |
| 4 | Ford | Gary Myers | Jason Myers | Mike Queen |
| 5 | Ford | Bob Ebersole | Kyle Ebersole | Bob Ebersole |
| 6 | Chevrolet | Constance Partridge | Ryan Preece 3 | Tommy Grasso |
| 8 | Chevrolet | Bobby Baldwin | Dalton Baldwin 3 | Bobby Baldwin |
| 10 | Chevrolet | Howard Harvey | Luke Fleming 1 | Kenny Minter Jr. |
| 11 | Chevrolet | Eddie Harvey | Andy Seuss | Eddie Harvey |
| 12 | Chevrolet | Donna Norman | Mike Norman 6 | Reggie Ruggerio |
| 14 | Chevrolet | Bobby Hutchens Jr. | Trey Hutchens (R) | Bobby Hutchens Jr. |
| 15 | Chevrolet | Grady Jeffreys Jr. | Jeremy Gerstner | Grady Jeffreys Sr. |
| 21 | Chevrolet | Mike Smeriglio III | Doug Coby 1 | Phillip Moran |
| 22 | Chevrolet | Kyle Bonsignore | Kyle Bonsignore 2 | Bill Bonsignore |
| 23 | Chevrolet | Bobby Loftin | Brian Loftin 2 | Mike Adams |
| 25 | Chevrolet | Misty Smith | John Smith 6 | Jody Utt |
| 28 | Chevrolet | George Brunnhoelzl Jr. | George Brunnhoelzl III | George Brunnhoelzl Jr. |
| 32 | Chevrolet | Tom Abele Sr. | Tom Abele Jr. 6 | Tom Abele Sr. |
| 37 | Chevrolet | Paul Hartwig | Paul Hartwig Jr. 2 | Neil Rutt |
| 40 | Chevrolet | Gina Fleming | Frank Fleming | Chris Fleming |
| 43 | Chevrolet | Michael Calabrese | David Calabrese | Bobby Foley |
| 58 | Chevrolet | Edgar Goodale | Eric Goodale 5 | Jason Shephard |
| 65 | Chevrolet | Eddie Bohn | Danny Bohn 4 | Eddie Bohn |
| 73 | Chevrolet | Paul Hartwig | Paul Hartwig Jr. 1 | Neil Rutt |
| 74 | Chevrolet | Kevin Hughes | Bobby Measmer Jr. | Bobby Measmer Sr. |
| 77 | Chevrolet | Mike Curb | Gary Putnam | Don Tarantino |
| 79 | Pontiac 9 | Susan Hill | Spencer Davis 4 | David Hill |
| 79 | Pontiac 9 | Susan Hill | Joe Ryan Osborne 3 | David Hill |
| 79 | Pontiac 9 | Susan Hill | James Civali 2 | David Hill |
| 79 | Chevrolet 1 | Susan Hill | James Civali 1 | Chris Kopec |
| 95 | Chevrolet | Bubba Gale | Cale Gale 2 | Bubba Gale |
| 97 | Chevrolet | Bryan Dauzat | Bryan Dauzat 2 | Bob Rahilly |
| 98 | Chevrolet | Mike Curb | Ryan Preece 2 | Jeff Preece |
| 99 | Chevrolet | Susanne Winstead | A. J. Winstead 3 | Reginald Winstead |

== Schedule ==
| No. | Race title | Track | Date | TV |
|---|---|---|---|---|
| 1 | Spring Classic 150 | Caraway Speedway, Asheboro, North Carolina | March 15^{1} | |
| 2 | Charles Kepley Memorial 150 | Caraway Speedway, Asheboro, North Carolina | March 28 | |
| 3 | South Boston 150 | South Boston Speedway, South Boston, Virginia | April 4 | |
| 4 | Pepsi 150 | Langley Speedway, Hampton, Virginia | April 11 | FansChoice.TV |
| 5 | 9th Annual Daggett Shuler Attorneys at Law Rusty Harpe Memorial 150 | Caraway Speedway, Asheboro, North Carolina | July 4 | |
| 6 | Strutmasters.com 199 | Bowman Gray Stadium, Winston-Salem, North Carolina | August 1 | NBCSN |
| 7 | Bush's Beans 150 (Note: The Bush's Beans 150 will be held as a combined event, with competitors from the Whelen Southern Modified Tour competing along with competitors for the Whelen Modified Tour. The race was run with a series-based point distribution, where drivers received points and statistical credit for their finish relative to other drivers in their series, not to the whole field in general.) | Bristol Motor Speedway, Bristol, Tennessee | August 19 | NBCSN |
| 8 | Bayport Credit Union 150 presented by Budweiser | Langley Speedway, Hampton, Virginia | September 5 | NBCSN |
| 9 | South Boston 150 | South Boston Speedway, South Boston, Virginia | September 19 | NBCSN |
| 10 | Charlotte 150 | Charlotte Motor Speedway, Concord, North Carolina | October 8 | NBCSN |

Notes

- ^{1} – The Spring Classic 150 was originally scheduled for March 14, but was postponed a day due to forecasted heavy rain.
- The MTP Tire 150 was originally scheduled at Hickory Motor Speedway for October 3, but was postponed a day due to forecasted heavy rain. On October 3, it was announced that the race would not be rescheduled.

== Results and standings ==
=== Races ===
| No. | Race | Pole position | Most laps led | Winning driver | Manufacturer |
|---|---|---|---|---|---|
| 1 | Spring Classic 150 | Jason Myers | George Brunnhoelzl III | Eric Goodale | Chevrolet |
| 2 | Charles Kepley Memorial 150 | Ryan Preece | J. R. Bertuccio | Andy Seuss | Chevrolet |
| 3 | South Boston 150 | Ryan Preece | Ryan Preece | Ryan Preece | Chevrolet |
| 4 | Pepsi 150 | George Brunnhoelzl III | George Brunnhoelzl III | Burt Myers | Ford |
| 5 | 9th Annual Daggett Shuler Attorneys at Law Rusty Harpe Memorial 150 | Andy Seuss | Andy Seuss | George Brunnhoelzl III | Chevrolet |
| 6 | Strutmasters.com 199 | Ryan Preece | George Brunnhoelzl III | Danny Bohn | Chevrolet |
| 7 | Bush's Beans 150 | Gary Putnam | Woody Pitkat | Andy Seuss | Chevrolet |
| 8 | Bayport Credit Union 150 presented by Budweiser | George Brunnhoelzl III | George Brunnhoelzl III | George Brunnhoelzl III | Chevrolet |
| 9 | South Boston 150 | Bobby Measmer Jr. | Andy Seuss | Andy Seuss | Chevrolet |
| 10 | Southern Slam 150 | George Brunnhoelzl III | George Brunnhoelzl III | George Brunnhoelzl III | Chevrolet |

=== Drivers' championship ===
(key) Bold – Pole position awarded by time. Italics - Pole position set by final practice results or rainout. * – Most laps led.

| Pos | Driver | CRW | CRW | SBO | LGY | CRW | BGS | BRI | LGY | SBO | CLT | Points |
|---|---|---|---|---|---|---|---|---|---|---|---|---|
| 1 | Andy Seuss | 19 | 1 | 16 | 4 | **7*** | 6 | 6 | 3 | 1* | 6 | 393 |
| 2 | George Brunnhoelzl III | 16* | 11 | 18 | **3*** | 1 | 15* | 15 | **1*** | 2 | **1*** | 390 |
| 3 | Jason Myers | **2** | 6 | 10 | 6 | 2 | 10 | 17 | 5 | 7 | 4 | 385 |
| 4 | Burt Myers | 6 | 5 | 3 | 1 | 16 | 4 | 30 | 4 | 6 | 5 | 384 |
| 5 | Kyle Ebersole | 13 | 7 | 6 | 2 | 4 | 8 | 26 | 2 | 8 | 12 | 371 |
| 6 | Frank Fleming | 8 | 8 | 11 | 5 | 9 | 12 | 16 | 8 | 4 | 11 | 360 |
| 7 | Bobby Measmer Jr. | 5 | 13 | 14 | 10 | 8 | 5 | 25 | 7 | **3** | 9 | 358 |
| 8 | Gary Putnam | 7 | 9 | 9 | 9 | 6 | 11 | 20 | 12 | 14 | 14 | 343 |
| 9 | Jeremy Gerstner | 11 | 19 | 15 | 8 | 17 | 3 | 21 | 6 | 5 | 7 | 342 |
| 10 | David Calabrese | 4 | 16 | 7 | 11 | 12 | 19 | 27 | 10 | 12 | 16 | 324 |
| 11 | Trey Hutchens **(R)** | DNQ^{1} | 14 | 8 | 13 | 13 | 14 | Wth | 11 | 9 | 13 | 281 |
| 12 | J. R. Bertuccio | 10 | 4* | 2 | 7 | 10 | 9 | 31 | | | | 257 |
| 13 | Ryan Preece | 14 | **3** | **1*** | | | **2** | 1^{3} | | | 2 | 206 |
| 14 | John Smith | 3 | 10 | 17 | 12 | | 17 | | | | 8 | 197 |
| 15 | Eric Goodale | 1 | 2 | 4 | | 3 | 20 | 28^{3} | | | | 194 |
| 16 | Mike Norman | 17 | 15 | 19 | | | 13 | | 14 | | 17 | 169 |
| 17 | Danny Bohn | | | 5 | | | 1 | | | 11 | 3 | 160 |
| 18 | Tom Abele Jr. | 9 | 18 | | 15 | 14 | 18 | DNQ | | | | 146 |
| 19 | Spencer Davis | 18 | 12 | 12 | 14 | | | | | | | 120 |
| 20 | Joe Ryan Osborne | | | | | 5 | 7 | 19^{3} | 9 | | | 111 |
| 21 | James Civali | | | | | | | 11 | | 10 | 15 | 105 |
| 22 | Dalton Baldwin | 12 | 17 | | | | | | | | 10 | 93 |
| 23 | A. J. Winstead | | | | | | 16 | | 13 | 15 | | 88 |
| 24 | Paul Hartwig Jr. | | | 13 | | DNS^{2} | 21 | | | | | 80 |
| 25 | Kyle Bonsignore | | | | | 15 | | 32^{3} | | 13 | | 60 |
| 26 | Luke Fleming | | | | | 11 | | | | | | 33 |
| 27 | Doug Coby | 15 | | | | | | 34^{3} | | | | 29 |
| 28 | Cale Gale | | | | | | | DNQ | | | 18 | 26 |
| | Brian Loftin | Wth | Wth | | | | | | | | | 0 |
| | Bryan Dauzat | Wth | Wth | | | | | | | | | 0 |
Drivers ineligible for Whelen Southern Modified Tour points
| | Woody Pitkat | | | | | | | **2*** | | | | |
| | Donny Lia | | | | | | | 3 | | | | |
| | Ryan Newman | | | | | | | 4 | | | | |
| | Bobby Santos III | | | | | | | 5 | | | | |
| | Jeff Goodale **(R)** | | | | | | | 7 | | | | |
| | Chase Dowling **(R)** | | | | | | | 8 | | | | |
| | Timmy Solomito | | | | | | | 9 | | | | |
| | Patrick Emerling | | | | | | | 10 | | | | |
| | Anthony Nocella **(R)** | | | | | | | 12 | | | | |
| | Ted Christopher | | | | | | | 13 | | | | |
| | Max Zachem **(R)** | | | | | | | 14 | | | | |
| | Shawn Solomito | | | | | | | 18 | | | | |
| | Rowan Pennink | | | | | | | 22 | | | | |
| | Ken Heagy | | | | | | | 23 | | | | |
| | Jamie Tomaino | | | | | | | 24 | | | | |
| | Johnny Bush | | | | | | | 29 | | | | |
| | Brendon Bock **(R)** | | | | | | | 33 | | | | |
| | Todd Szegedy | | | | | | | 35 | | | | |
| | Justin Bonsignore | | | | | | | 36 | | | | |
| | Ron Silk | | | | | | | Wth | | | | |
| | Dave Sapienza **(R)** | | | | | | | DNQ | | | | |
| | Wade Cole | | | | | | | DNQ | | | | |
| | Melissa Fifield | | | | | | | DNQ | | | | |
| Pos | Driver | CRW | CRW | SBO | LGY | CRW | BGS | BRI | LGY | SBO | CLT | Points |

Notes

- ^{1} – Trey Hutchens received championship points, despite the fact that he did not qualify for the race.
- ^{2} – Paul Hartwig Jr. received championship points, despite the fact that he did not start the race.
- ^{3} – Scored points towards the Whelen Modified Tour.

== See also ==
- 2015 NASCAR Sprint Cup Series
- 2015 NASCAR Xfinity Series
- 2015 NASCAR Camping World Truck Series
- 2015 NASCAR K&N Pro Series East
- 2015 NASCAR K&N Pro Series West
- 2015 NASCAR Whelen Modified Tour
- 2015 NASCAR Canadian Tire Series
- 2015 NASCAR Mexico Series
- 2015 NASCAR Whelen Euro Series
