= Jeremy Gerstner =

American racing driver

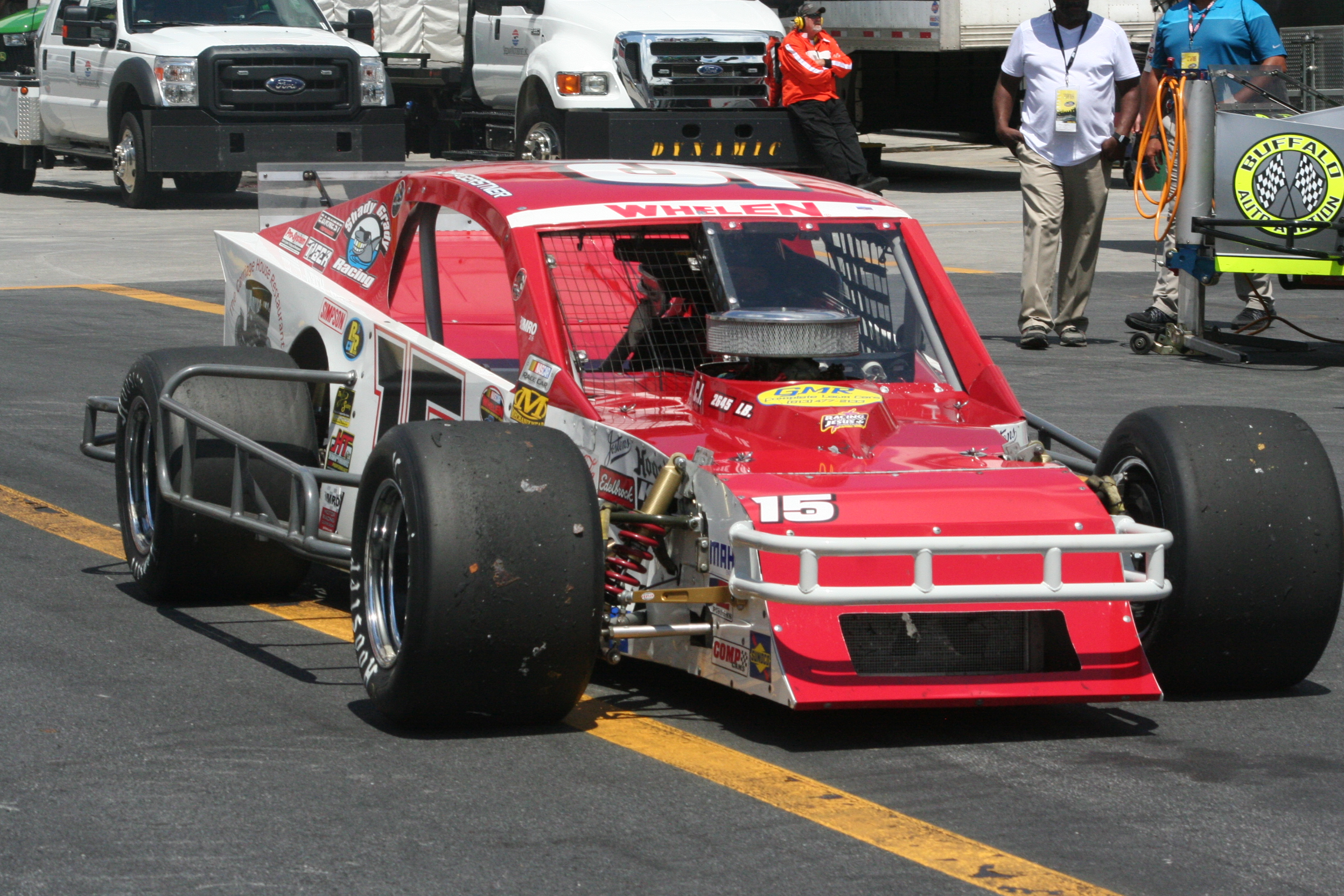
- Gerstner's No. 15 car at Bristol Motor Speedway in 2016
- Nationality: American
- Born: December 1, 1972 (age 53) Tampa, Florida, U.S.

NASCAR Whelen Modified Tour career
- Debut season: 2017
- Current team: Dawn Gerstner
- Years active: 2017, 2019–present
- Car number: 55
- Crew chief: Keith Wheeler
- Starts: 17
- Championships: 0
- Wins: 0
- Poles: 0
- Best finish: 31st in 2020
- Finished last season: 43rd (2026)
- Statistics up to date as of October 12, 2026.

Jeremy Gerstner (born December 1, 1972) is an American professional stock car racing driver who competes part-time in the NASCAR Whelen Modified Tour, driving the No. 55 for Dawn Gerstner.

Gerstner has also competed in series such as the now defunct NASCAR Whelen Southern Modified Tour, the SMART Modified Tour, the Southern Modified Racing Series, the X-1R Pro Cup Series, and the ASA Late Model Series Southern Division.

== Motorsports results ==
=== NASCAR ===
(key) (Bold – Pole position awarded by qualifying time. Italics – Pole position earned by points standings or practice time. * – Most laps led.)

==== Whelen Modified Tour ====
NASCAR Whelen Modified Tour results
Year	Car owner	No.	Make	1	2	3	4	5	6	7	8	9	10	11	12	13	14	15	16	17	18	NWMTC	Pts	Ref
2017	Grady Jeffreys	15	Chevy	MYR; 23	THO	STA	LGY	THO	RIV	NHA	STA	THO										45th	66	
2017	Sean McDonald	75	Chevy										BRI; 18	SEE	OSW	RIV	NHA	STA	THO			45th	66	
2019	Dawn Gerstner	55	Chevy	MYR	SBO; 29	TMP	STA	WAL	SEE	TMP	RIV	NHA	STA	TMP	OSW	RIV	NHA	STA	TMP			70th	15	
2020	Dawn Gerstner	55	Ford	JEN; 21				MND; Wth	TMP	NHA	STA	TMP										31st	69	
2020	Dawn Gerstner	55	Chevy		WMM; 20	WMM; 22	JEN; Wth															31st	69	
2021	Dawn Gerstner	55	Chevy	MAR; 28	STA	RIV	JEN	OSW	RIV	NHA	NRP	STA	BEE	OSW	RCH	RIV	STA					65th	16	
2022	Dawn Gerstner	55	Chevy	NSM; 27	RCH; 19	RIV	LEE	JEN	MND	RIV	WAL	NHA	CLM	TMP	LGY	OSW	RIV	TMP	MAR; 24			52nd	62	
2023	Dawn Gerstner	55	Chevy	NSM; 17	RCH	MON	RIV	LEE	SEE	RIV	WAL	NHA	LMP	THO	LGY	OSW	MON	RIV	NWS	THO	MAR	73rd	27	
2024	Dawn Gerstner	55	Chevy	NSM; 35	RCH	THO	MON	RIV	SEE	NHA	MON	LMP	THO	OSW	RIV	MON	THO	NWS	MAR			69th	9	
2025	Dawn Gerstner	55	Chevy	NSM; 26	THO	NWS; 9	SEE	RIV	WMM	LMP	MON	MON	THO	RCH	OSW	NHA	RIV	THO	MAR; 14			40th	83	
2026	Dawn Gerstner	55	Chevy	NSM; 24	MAR; 19	THO; Wth	SEE	RIV	OXF	SEE	CLM	WMM	MON	THO	NHA	STA	OSW	RIV	THO			43rd	45	

==== Whelen Southern Modified Tour ====
NASCAR Whelen Southern Modified Tour results
Year	Car owner	No.	Make	1	2	3	4	5	6	7	8	9	10	11	12	13	14	NWSMTC	Pts	Ref
2012	Dawn Gerstner	70	Chevy	CRW	CRW	SBO	CRW	CRW	BGS; 19	BRI	LGY	THO	CRW; DNQ	CLT				32nd	52	
2013	Dawn Gerstner	70	Chevy	CRW; 18	SNM; 21	SBO; 9	CRW; 15	CRW; 12	BGS; 7	BRI; 10	LGY; 17	CRW; 12	CRW; 13	SNM; 13	CLT; 17			13th	364	
2014	Dawn Gerstner	70	Chevy	CRW	SNM	SBO	LGY	CRW	BGS; 12								CLT; 13	23rd	91	
2014	Dawn Gerstner	12	Chevy							BRI; 16	LGY	CRW	SBO	SNM	CRW	CRW		23rd	91	
2015	Grady Jeffreys	15	Chevy	CRW; 11	CRW; 19	SBO; 15	LGY; 8	CRW; 17	BGS; 3	BRI; 7	LGY; 6	SBO; 5	CLT; 7					9th	342	
2016	Grady Jeffreys	15	Chevy	CRW; 10	CON; 13	SBO; 12	CRW; 13	CRW; 6	BGS; 16		ECA; 3	SBO; 9	CRW; 7	CLT; 11				8th	379	
2016	Grady Jeffreys	15S	Chevy							BRI; 6								8th	379	

=== SMART Modified Tour ===
SMART Modified Tour results
Year	Car owner	No.	Make	1	2	3	4	5	6	7	8	9	10	11	12	13	14	SMTC	Pts	Ref
2021	Dawn Gerstner	55	N/A	CRW; 16	FLO; 11	SBO; 16	FCS; 14	**CRW**; 8	DIL; 5*	CAR; 2	CRW; 5	DOM; 8	PUL; 5	HCY; 14	ACE			6th	246	
2022	N/A	79	N/A	FLO; 15	SNM; 18	CRW; 25	SBO; 16	FCS; 2	CRW; 5	NWS; 27	NWS; 20		DOM; 12	HCY	TRI	PUL		13th	155	
2022	N/A	8NY	N/A									CAR; 8						13th	155	
2023	Dawn Gerstner	55	Troyer	FLO; 18	CRW; 17	SBO; 8	HCY; 20	FCS; 11		ACE; 9	CAR; 11	PUL; 10	TRI; 19	SBO; 12	ROU; 13			10th	334	
2023	Dawn Gerstner	55FL	Troyer						CRW; 18									10th	334	
2025	Dawn Gerstner	55	Troyer	FLO	AND	SBO; 21	ROU	HCY	FCS	CRW; 12			CRW; 20				NWS; 12	18th	176	
2025	Grady Jeffreys Jr.	15	N/A								CPS; 13	CAR; 16		DOM; 17	FCS	TRI		18th	176	
2026	Dawn Gerstner	55	Troyer	FLO	AND	SBO	DOM	HCY; 18	WKS	FCR	CRW; Wth	PUL	CAR	ROU; 13	TRI	NWS		40th	51	
