= Paulie Hartwig III =

American racing driver (born 2011)

- Nationality: American
- Born: February 21, 2011 (age 15) Galloway Township, New Jersey, U.S.

NASCAR Whelen Modified Tour career
- Debut season: 2026
- Years active: 2026–present
- Starts: 15
- Championships: 0
- Wins: 0
- Poles: 1
- Best finish: 10th in 2026
- Finished last season: 10th (2026)
- Statistics up to date as of October 12, 2026.

Paul "Paulie" Hartwig III (born February 21, 2011) is an American professional stock car racing driver who competes full-time in the Whelen Modified Tour, driving the No. 73 for his father, Paul Hartwig Jr., who has previously competed in racing, including in the now defunct NASCAR Whelen Southern Modified Tour.

Hartwig originally made his debut in the SMART Modified Tour in 2022, but did not return until 2025 due to age restrictions. On April 12, 2025, Hartwig became the youngest winner in the series' history when he won at Hickory Motor Speedway at the age of fourteen.

In 2026, Hartwig will compete in the NASCAR Whelen Modified Tour on a full-time basis. He will, however, skip the opening race at New Smyrna Speedway due to age restrictions.

Hartwig has also competed in series such as the Carolina Crate Modified Series, the Race of Champions Asphalt Modified Tour, the Indoor Auto Racing Championship, and the Short Track Super Series.

== Motorsports results ==
=== NASCAR ===
(key) (Bold – Pole position awarded by qualifying time. Italics – Pole position earned by points standings or practice time. * – Most laps led.)

==== Whelen Modified Tour ====
NASCAR Whelen Modified Tour results
Year	Team	No.	Make	1	2	3	4	5	6	7	8	9	10	11	12	13	14	15	16	NWMTC	Pts	Ref
2026	Paul Hartwig Jr.	73	N/A	NSM	MAR; 29	THO; 28	SEE; 15	RIV; 12	OXF; 5	SEE; 10	CLM; 5	WMM; 3	MON; 4	THO; 7	NHA; 13	STA; 10	OSW; 9	RIV; 2	**THO**; 11*	10th	502	

=== SMART Modified Tour ===
SMART Modified Tour results
Year	Car owner	No.	Make	1	2	3	4	5	6	7	8	9	10	11	12	13	14	SMTC	Pts	Ref
2022	Paul Hartwig Jr.	73	N/A	FLO	SNM	CRW	SBO	FCS	CRW; 8	NWS	NWS	CAR	DOM	HCY	TRI	PUL		40th	23	
2025	Paul Hartwig Jr.	73	N/A	FLO; 16	AND; 2	SBO; 6	ROU; 2	HCY; 1	FCS; 6	CRW; 22	CPS; 6	**CAR**; 3	CRW; 3	DOM; 9	FCS; 9	TRI; 3	NWS; 8	3rd	491	
2026	Paul Hartwig Jr.	20	N/A	FLO	AND	SBO; 26	DOM	HCY	WKS	FCR	CRW; 26	PUL	CAR	ROU				37th	57	
2026	Jamie Tomaino	99	N/A												TRI; Wth	NWS; 17		37th	57	
