= Paul Hartwig Jr. =

American racing driver

- Nationality: American
- Born: February 26, 1991 (age 35) Freehold, New Jersey, U.S.

NASCAR Whelen Southern Modified Tour career
- Debut season: 2015
- Years active: 2015
- Starts: 2
- Championships: 0
- Wins: 0
- Poles: 0
- Best finish: 24th in 2015
- Statistics up to date as of April 24, 2025.

Paul Hartwig Jr. (born February 26, 1991) is an American retired professional stock car racing driver who competed in the now defunct NASCAR Whelen Southern Modified Tour for two races in 2015, getting a best finish of thirteenth at South Boston Speedway. He is the father of Paulie Hartwig III, who is also a racing driver.

Hartwig has previously competed in series such as the SMART Modified Tour, the Race of Champions Asphalt Modified Tour, the 602 Modified Tour, the Carolina Crate Modified Series, and the World Series of Asphalt Stock Car Racing.

== Motorsports results ==
=== NASCAR ===
(key) (Bold – Pole position awarded by qualifying time. Italics – Pole position earned by points standings or practice time. * – Most laps led.)

==== Whelen Modified Tour ====
NASCAR Whelen Modified Tour results
Year	Car owner	No.	Make	1	2	3	4	5	6	7	8	9	10	11	12	13	14	15	NWMTC	Pts	Ref
2015	Paul Hartwig	73	Chevy	TMP	STA	WAT	STA	TMP	RIV; DNQ	NHA	MON	STA	TMP	BRI	RIV	NHA	STA	TMP	57th	11	

==== Whelen Southern Modified Tour ====
NASCAR Whelen Southern Modified Tour results
Year	Car owner	No.	Make	1	2	3	4	5	6	7	8	9	10	NSWMTC	Pts	Ref
2015	Paul Hartwig	37	Chevy	CRW	CRW	SBO; 13	LGY							24th	80	
2015	Paul Hartwig	73	Chevy					CRW; 18	BGS; 21	BRI	LGY	SBO	CLT	24th	80	

=== SMART Modified Tour ===
SMART Modified Tour results
Year	Car owner	No.	Make	1	2	3	4	5	6	7	8	9	10	11	12	13	14	SMTC	Pts	Ref
2024	Paul Hartwig Jr.	73	N/A	FLO	CRW	SBO; 29	TRI	ROU	HCY	FCS	CRW	JAC	CAR	CRW	DOM	SBO	NWS	65th	9	
