= Rowan Pennink =

American racing driver

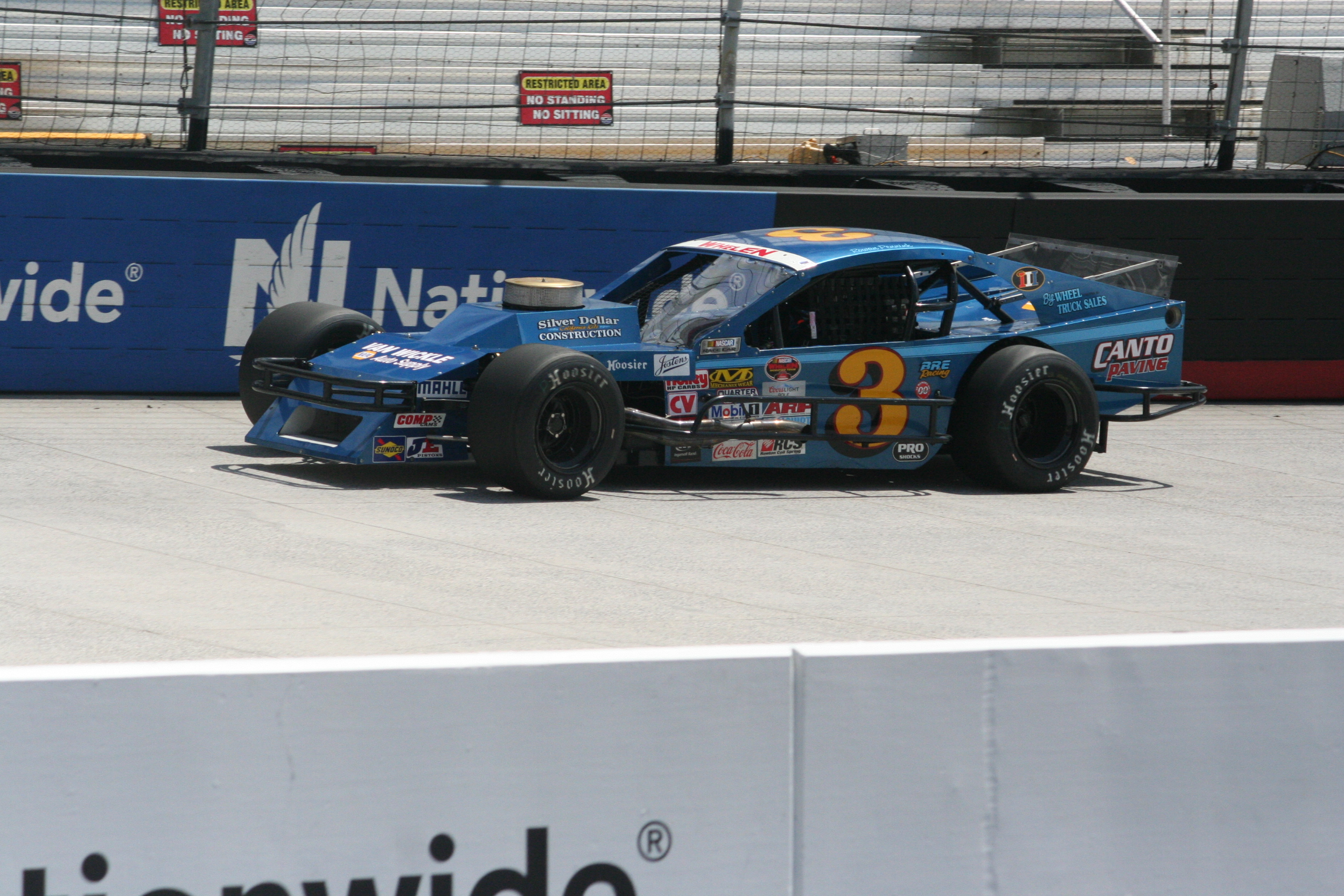
- Pennink's No. 3 car at Bristol Motor Speedway in 2016
- Nationality: American
- Born: September 3, 1985 (age 41) Huntingdon Valley, Pennsylvania, U.S.

NASCAR Whelen Modified Tour career
- Debut season: 2007
- Years active: 2007–2018
- Former teams: Mark Pennink, Boehler Racing Enterprises
- Starts: 166
- Championships: 0
- Wins: 3
- Poles: 1
- Best finish: 4th in 2009, 2011, 2013, 2017
- Statistics up to date as of July 22, 2024.

Rowan Pennink (born September 3, 1985) is an American former professional stock car racing driver who last competed part-time in the NASCAR Whelen Modified Tour.

Pennink was a long-time competitor of the series, having made his debut in 2007, won three races and one pole position between 2010 and 2018. Pennink retired from driving midway through the 2018 season due to recurrent back problems.

Pennink was the 2013 Modified Racing Series championship and also won two track championships in the SK Modified division at Stafford Speedway in 2015 & 2016.

Pennink has also competed in the now defunct NASCAR Whelen Southern Modified Tour, as well as the Modified Racing Series, the ACT Late Model Tour, the Race of Champions Asphalt Modified Tour, the EXIT Realty Modified Touring Series, the Tri-Track Open Modified Series, and the World Series of Asphalt Stock Car Racing.

== Motorsports results ==
=== NASCAR ===
(key) (Bold – Pole position awarded by qualifying time. Italics – Pole position earned by points standings or practice time. * – Most laps led.)

==== Whelen Modified Tour ====
NASCAR Whelen Modified Tour results
Year	Car owner	No.	Make	1	2	3	4	5	6	7	8	9	10	11	12	13	14	15	16	17	NWMTC	Pts	Ref
2007	Mark Pennink	93	Chevy	TMP; 14	STA; DNQ	WTO; 18	STA; DNQ	TMP; 12	NHA; 24	TSA; 17	RIV; 13	STA; 19	TMP; 24	MAN; 21	MAR; 5	NHA; 39	TMP; 17	STA; 14	TMP; 14		17th	1634	
2008	Mark Pennink	93	Chevy	TMP; 9	STA; 6	STA; 11	TMP; 19	NHA; 16	SPE; 12	RIV; 21	STA; 25	TMP; 7	MAN; 13	TMP; 8	NHA; 22	MAR; 8	CHE; 9	STA; 7	TMP; 12		8th	2016	
2009	Mark Pennink	93	Chevy	TMP; 9	STA; 26	STA; 7	NHA; 4	SPE; 4	RIV; 10	STA; 5	BRI; 6	TMP; 4	NHA; 6	MAR; 13	STA; 6	TMP; 5					4th	1867	
2010	Mark Pennink	93	Chevy	TMP; 6	STA; 4	STA; 26	MAR; 32	NHA; 25	LIM; 22	MND; 12	RIV; 1	STA; 29	TMP; 4	BRI; 22	NHA; 35	STA; 4	TMP; 9				11th	1648	
2011	Mark Pennink	93	Chevy	TMP; 2	STA; 2	STA; 2	MND; 10	TMP; 3*	NHA; 5	RIV; 6	STA; 6	NHA; 16	BRI; 14	DEL; 18	TMP; 8	LRP; 6	NHA; 22	STA; 12	TMP; 28		4th	2219	
2012	Mark Pennink	93	Chevy	TMP; 10	STA; 13	MND	STA; 5	WFD; 6	NHA; 6	STA; 12	TMP; 6	BRI; 21	TMP; 19	RIV; 14	NHA; 5	STA; 15	TMP; 29				12th	412	
2013	Mark Pennink	93	Chevy	TMP; 2*	STA; 5	STA; 3	WFD; 8	RIV; 11	NHA; 15	MND; 3	STA; 13	TMP; 18	BRI; 22	RIV; 7	NHA; 25	STA; 3	TMP; 1				4th	487	
2014	Mark Pennink	93	Chevy	TMP; 22*	STA; 3	STA; 4	WFD; 16	RIV; 22	NHA; 17	MND	STA; 6	TMP; 21	BRI	NHA; 5	STA; 10	TMP; 3					16th	359	
2015	Mark Pennink	93	Chevy	TMP; 13	STA; 7	WFD; 8	STA; 7	TMP; 13	RIV; 25	NHA; 24	MND; 14	STA; 20	TMP; 19	BRI; 15	RIV; 11	NHA; 32	STA	TMP			18th	364	
2016	Boehler Racing Enterprises	3	Chevy	TMP; 9	STA; 3	WFD; 18	STA; 6	TMP; 7	RIV; 21	NHA; 14	MND; 2	STA; 25	TMP; 25	BRI; 21	RIV; 11	OSW; 7	SEE; 8	NHA; 20	STA; 6	TMP; 14	11th	533	
2017	Boehler Racing Enterprises	3	Chevy	MYR; 7	TMP; 1*	STA; 6	LGY; 7	TMP; 2	RIV; 7	NHA; 9	STA; 17	**TMP**; 7	BRI; 7	SEE; 12	OSW; 10	RIV; 21	NHA; 2	STA; 23	TMP; 4		4th	570	
2018	Boehler Racing Enterprises	3	Chevy	MYR; Wth	TMP; 3	STA; 3	SEE; 4	TMP; 2	LGY; 8	RIV; 20	NHA; 6	STA; 4*	TMP	BRI; 8	OSW	RIV	NHA	STA	TMP		20th	341	

==== Whelen Southern Modified Tour ====
NASCAR Whelen Southern Modified Tour results
Year	Car owner	No.	Make	1	2	3	4	5	6	7	8	9	10	11	12	13	14	NSWMTC	Pts	Ref
2008	Johnny Hemric	93	Chevy	CRW; 11	ACE	CRW	BGS	CRW	LAN	CRW	SNM	MAR	CRW	CRW				36th	130	
2009	Mark Pennink	9	Chevy	CON; 2	SBO	CRW; 24	LAN	CRW	BGS	BRI	CRW	MBS	CRW	CRW	MAR	ACE	CRW	28th	261	
