= Shawn Solomito =

American racing driver

- Nationality: American
- Born: February 14, 1989 (age 37) Islip, New York, U.S.

NASCAR Whelen Modified Tour career
- Debut season: 2011
- Years active: 2011–2018
- Starts: 48
- Championships: 0
- Wins: 0
- Poles: 1
- Best finish: 16th in 2015
- Statistics up to date as of August 9, 2024.

Shawn Solomito (born February 14, 1989) is an American professional stock car racing driver who competed in the NASCAR Whelen Modified Tour from 2011 to 2018. He is the older brother of fellow driver Timmy Solomito, who currently competes part-time in the Modified Tour.

Solomito grew up racing at the Riverhead Raceway, where he is a two-time track champion in the tracks premier modified division. He has also competed in the Modified Racing Series and the Allison Legacy Race Series.

== Motorsports results ==
=== NASCAR ===
(key) (Bold – Pole position awarded by qualifying time. Italics – Pole position earned by points standings or practice time. * – Most laps led.)

==== Whelen Modified Tour ====
NASCAR Whelen Modified Tour results
Year	Car owner	No.	Make	1	2	3	4	5	6	7	8	9	10	11	12	13	14	15	16	17	NWMTC	Pts	Ref
2011	Jerry Sololmito Sr.	66	Chevy	TMP	STA	STA	MND	TMP	NHA	RIV; 19	STA	NHA	BRI	DEL	TMP	LRP	NHA	STA	TMP		49th	106	
2012	Thomas Bonsignore	57	Chevy	TMP	STA	MND	STA	WFD	NHA	STA	TMP	BRI	TMP	RIV	NHA	STA	TMP; 24				48th	20	
2013	Jerry Solomito	89	Chevy	TMP	STA	STA	WFD; 16	RIV; 4	NHA	MND	STA	TMP	BRI	RIV; 12	NHA	STA	TMP				31st	100	
2014	Jerry Solomito	89	Chevy	TMP	STA	STA; 16	WFD; 22	RIV; 9	NHA	MND	STA	TMP	BRI	NHA	STA						29th	93	
2014	Mike Murphy	64	Chevy													TMP; 36					29th	93	
2015	Wayne Anderson	75	Chevy	TMP; 32	STA; 17	WAT; 18	STA; 15	TMP	RIV; 18	NHA; 29	MON; 7	STA; 11	TMP; 28	BRI; 13	RIV; 20	NHA; 17	STA; 5	TMP; 13			16th	373	
2016	Wayne Anderson	75	Chevy	TMP; 16	STA; 6	WFD	STA; 11	TMP; 16	RIV; 24	NHA	MND; 23	STA; 15	TMP; 9	BRI	**RIV**; 3	OSW	SEE	NHA; 13	STA; 10	TMP; 27	21st	356	
2017	Wayne Anderson	75	Chevy	MYR; 21	TMP; 29																24th	220	
2017	Wayne Anderson	48	Chevy			STA; 19	LGY	TMP; 25	RIV; 14	NHA; 10											24th	220	
2017	Jerry Solomito	66	Chevy								STA; 22	TMP	BRI	SEE; 21	OSW						24th	220	
2017	Ken Zachem	20	Chevy													RIV; 15	NHA	STA	TMP		24th	220	
2018	Jerry Solomito	66	Chevy	MYR	TMP	STA; 10	SEE	TMP; 12	LGY	RIV	NHA	STA	TMP	BRI	OSW	RIV; 8	NHA	STA	TMP; 20		36th	126	
