= Wayne Anderson (racing driver, born 1946) =

American racing driver

- Nationality: American
- Born: October 8, 1946 (age 80) Yaphank, New York, U.S.

NASCAR Whelen Modified Tour career
- Debut season: 1985
- Years active: 1985–1995, 2000, 2002–2008
- Starts: 170
- Championships: 1
- Wins: 3
- Poles: 1
- Best finish: 1st in 1994
- Statistics up to date as of October 18, 2024.

Wayne Anderson (born October 8, 1946) is an American former professional stock car racing driver and team owner who competed in the NASCAR Whelen Modified Tour from 1985 to 2008. He is a former champion of the series, having previously won the championship in 1994 while driving for Len Boehler.

Anderson has also previously competed in the World Series of Asphalt Stock Car Racing.

== Motorsports results ==
=== NASCAR ===
(key) (Bold – Pole position awarded by qualifying time. Italics – Pole position earned by points standings or practice time. * – Most laps led.)

==== Whelen Modified Tour ====
NASCAR Whelen Modified Tour results
| Year | Team | No. | Make | 1 | 2 | 3 | 4 | 5 | 6 | 7 | 8 | 9 | 10 | 11 | 12 | 13 | 14 | 15 | 16 | 17 | 18 | 19 | 20 | 21 | 22 | 23 | 24 | 25 | 26 | 27 | 28 | 29 | NWMTC | Pts | Ref |
|---|---|---|---|---|---|---|---|---|---|---|---|---|---|---|---|---|---|---|---|---|---|---|---|---|---|---|---|---|---|---|---|---|---|---|---|
| 1985 | N/A | 15 | Chevy | TMP | MAR | STA | MAR | NEG; 18 | WFD | NEG | SPE | RIV; 10 | CLA | STA | TMP | NEG; 5 | HOL | HOL | RIV; 22 | CAT | EPP | TMP | WFD | RIV; 2 | STA | TMP; 18 | POC | TIO; 7 | OXF; 10 | STA | TMP | MAR | 25th | 945 | |
| 1986 | N/A | 15 | Chevy | ROU; 8 | MAR; 9 | STA | TMP | MAR | NEG; 1 | MND; 11 | EPP | NEG; 11 | WFD | SPE | RIV; 23 | NEG | TMP | RIV; 17 | TMP | RIV; 14 | STA | TMP | POC | TIO | OXF | STA | TMP | MAR | | | | | 22nd | 1047 | |
| 1987 | N/A | 45 | Chevy | ROU; 11 | | | | | | | | | | | | | | | | | | | | POC; 32 | TIO | TMP | OXF | TMP | ROU | MAR | STA | | 26th | 967 | |
| 1987 | N/A | 51 | Chevy | | MAR; 19 | TMP | STA | | | | | | | | | | | | | | | | | | | | | | | | | | 26th | 967 | |
| 1987 | N/A | 15S | N/A | | | | | CNB; 12 | STA | MND | WFD | JEN | SPE | | | | | | | | | | | | | | | | | | | | 26th | 967 | |
| 1987 | N/A | 15 | Chevy | | | | | | | | | | | RIV; 2 | TMP | RPS | EPP | RIV; 17 | STA | TMP | RIV; 7 | SEE; 18 | STA | | | | | | | | | | 26th | 967 | |
| 1988 | Axel Anderson | 15 | Chevy | ROU; 26 | MAR; DNQ | TMP; 23 | MAR; 12 | JEN; 14 | IRP; 19 | MND; 15 | OSW; 15 | OSW | **RIV**; 5 | JEN; 20 | | TMP; 13 | RIV; 3 | OSW | TMP; 13 | OXF | OSW; 7 | TMP; 7 | POC; 6 | TIO; 16 | TMP; 13 | ROU; 10 | MAR; 6 | | | | | | 11th | 2542 | |
| 1988 | N/A | 33 | N/A | | | | | | | | | | | | RPS; 19 | | | | | | | | | | | | | | | | | | 11th | 2542 | |
| 1989 | Axel Anderson | 15 | Chevy | MAR; 8 | TMP; 17 | MAR; 28 | JEN | STA; 6 | IRP | OSW; 23 | WFD; 17 | MND | RIV; 5 | OSW | JEN | STA; 10 | RPS | RIV; 4 | OSW | TMP | TMP; 5 | RPS | OSW | TMP; 20 | POC; 21 | STA; 11 | TIO | MAR; 7 | TMP | | | | 20th | 1833 | |
| 1990 | N/A | 16 | Chevy | MAR | TMP | RCH | STA | MAR | STA | TMP | MND | HOL | STA | RIV; DNQ | JEN | EPP | RPS | RIV; 12 | TMP | RPS | NHA | TMP; 20 | POC; 41 | STA | TMP | MAR | | | | | | | 38th | 349 | |
| 1991 | N/A | 51 | Chevy | MAR; 15 | | | | | | | | | | | | | | | | | | | | | | | | | | | | | 16th | 2415 | |
| 1991 | Axel Anderson | 16 | Chevy | | RCH; 13 | TMP; 14 | NHA; 8 | MAR; 7 | NZH; 10 | STA; 2 | TMP; 14 | FLE | OXF; 15 | RIV; 17 | JEN | STA; 8 | RPS; 23 | RIV; 12 | RCH | TMP; 13 | NHA; 26 | TMP | POC; 8 | | TMP; 7 | MAR; 5 | | | | | | | 16th | 2415 | |
| 1991 | Guy Ronzoni | 0 | Pontiac | | | | | | | | | | | | | | | | | | | | | STA; 23 | | | | | | | | | 16th | 2415 | |
| 1992 | Axel Anderson | 16 | Chevy | MAR; 2 | TMP; 8 | RCH; 21 | STA; 6 | MAR; 18 | NHA; 6 | NZH; 2 | STA; 4 | TMP; 19 | FLE; 11 | RIV; 19 | NHA; 13 | STA; 14 | RPS; 16 | RIV; 6 | TMP; 5 | TMP; 22 | NHA; 9 | STA; 24 | MAR; 2 | TMP; 6 | | | | | | | | | 6th | 2804 | |
| 1993 | Wayne Anderson | 15 | Chevy | RCH; 6 | STA; 22 | TMP; 11 | NHA; 6 | NZH; 26 | STA; 15 | RIV; 13 | NHA; 7 | RPS; 5 | HOL; 8 | LEE; 6 | RIV; 1 | STA; 4 | TMP; 26 | TMP; 9 | STA; 25 | TMP; 29 | | | | | | | | | | | | | 8th | 2174 | |
| 1994 | Boehler Racing Enterprises | 3 | Chevy | NHA; 7 | STA; 5 | TMP; 4 | NZH; 3 | STA; 3 | LEE; 8 | TMP; 4 | RIV; 3 | | NHA; 8 | RPS; 17 | | TMP; 5 | | NHA; 16 | STA; 19 | SPE; 2 | TMP; 10 | NHA; 4 | STA; 1* | | | | | | | | | | 1st | 3139 | |
| 1994 | Wayne Anderson | 15 | Chevy | | | | | | | | | TIO; 2 | | | HOL; 14 | | RIV; 2 | | | | | | | TMP; 7 | | | | | | | | | 1st | 3139 | |
| 1995 | Wayne Anderson | 15 | Ford | TMP; 8 | NHA; 28 | STA; 9 | NZH; 33 | STA; 12 | LEE; 23 | TMP; 29 | RIV; 4 | BEE; 24 | NHA; 10 | JEN; 9 | RPS; 13 | HOL; 14 | RIV; 27 | | STA; 22 | TMP; 14 | | STA; 24 | TMP; 20 | TMP; 2 | | | | | | | | | 17th | 2355 | |
| 1995 | Wayne Anderson | 15 | Chevy | | | | | | | | | | | | | | | NHA; 28 | | | NHA; 13 | | | | | | | | | | | | 17th | 2355 | |
| 2000 | N/A | 26 | N/A | STA | RCH | STA | RIV | SEE | NHA | NZH | TMP | RIV | GLN | TMP | STA | WFD | NHA | STA | MAR | TMP; DNQ | | | | | | | | | | | | | N/A | 0 | |
| 2002 | N/A | 15 | Chevy | TMP | STA | WFD | NZH | RIV; DNQ | SEE | RCH | STA | BEE | NHA | RIV; 22 | TMP | STA | WFD | TMP | NHA | STA | MAR | TMP | | | | | | | | | | | 67th | 161 | |
| 2003 | N/A | 15 | Chevy | TMP | STA | WFD | NZH | STA | LER | BLL | BEE | NHA | ADI | RIV; 10 | TMP | STA | WFD | TMP | NHA | STA | TMP | | | | | | | | | | | | 65th | 134 | |
| 2004 | Joette Anderson | 45 | Chevy | TMP | STA | WFD | NZH | STA | RIV; 28 | LER | WAL | BEE | NHA | SEE | RIV; 3 | STA | TMP | WFD | TMP | NHA | STA | TMP | | | | | | | | | | | 61st | 244 | |
| 2005 | Joette Anderson | 45 | Chevy | TMP | STA | RIV; 28 | WFD | STA | JEN | NHA | BEE | SEE | RIV; 21 | STA | TMP | WFD | MAR | TMP | NHA | STA; 25 | TMP | | | | | | | | | | | | 52nd | 267 | |
| 2006 | Joette Anderson | 45 | Chevy | TMP | STA | JEN | TMP | STA | NHA | HOL | RIV; 25 | STA | TMP | MAR | TMP | NHA | WFD | TMP | STA | | | | | | | | | | | | | | 63rd | 88 | |
| 2007 | N/A | 15 | Chevy | TMP | STA | WTO | STA | TMP | NHA | TSA | RIV; 26 | STA | TMP | MAN | MAR | NHA | TMP | STA | TMP | | | | | | | | | | | | | | 62nd | 85 | |
| 2008 | N/A | 15 | Chevy | TMP | STA | STA | TMP | NHA | SPE | RIV; 23 | STA | TMP | MAN | TMP | NHA | MAR | CHE | STA | TMP | | | | | | | | | | | | | | 57th | 94 | |

Sporting positions
| Preceded by Rick Fuller | NASCAR Featherlite Modified Tour Champion; 1994 | Succeeded by Tony Hirschman Jr. |
