= Ollie Silva =

American race car driver

- Born: May 14, 1929 (Note: Silva's military gravestone lists his date of birth as May 14, 1929. Other government records list his date of birth as May 15, 1929.); New York State, U.S.
- Died: August 15, 2004 (aged 75); Manchester, New Hampshire, U.S.
- Resting place: Elmwood Cemetery; Haverhill, Massachusetts
- Occupation: Race car driver
- Years active: 1949–1980
- Awards: New England Auto Racers Hall of Fame

Oliver W. Silva (May 14, 1929 – August 15, 2004) was an American auto racing driver. He raced in the Northeastern United States, winning many races, track championships, and touring-series championships. Silva drove in modifieds, supermodifieds, pro stocks, late models and sprint cars. He was the first driver inducted to the New England Auto Racers Hall of Fame when it was instituted in 1998.

== Biography ==
One of 16 children born to Portuguese immigrants, Silva started driving at the age of ten, steering a tractor and a pickup truck on his family's large produce and poultry farm in Topsfield, Massachusetts. By the time he was 14, he had secretly purchased a car and hid it in woods near the farm to "practice drive" on rarely used back roads. Silva served in the United States Army from February 1951 to February 1953, during the Korean War. He later worked as a carpenter and roofer.

Silva began racing in 1949 at Dracut Speedway in a 1934 Ford Coupe. Silva raced and won features from Canada to Florida, and won an estimated 500 features in 12 states. He drove for many years in a touring SuperModified association known as NESMRA.

Silva drove in underfunded cars. The Lawrence Eagle-Tribune published a story about him in 1999, where he described one race in Quebec: "We just had this little flathead engine. They had these big fuel-injected Chrysler V-8s. But when they got to the end of the straightaways, they didn't know how to drive through the turns. I wasn't going to tell them." "They're speaking French and all of a sudden one guy wants to buy our motor. Another one wanted to buy the rear end. Somebody else bought the transmission. Then somebody else bought the body, frame and roll bars. We came home with an empty trailer." Silva built himself a new racer the next week. Silva had offers to race for big-money NASCAR teams, but he turned them down because he wanted to be his own boss.

Silva joined forces for several years with car owner Vic Miller in a unique 01 Supermodified which was very successful. One of his last SuperModified rides was in the Clyde Booth "nine" car.

Silva died in 2004, aged 75, at the Manchester VA Medical Center in Manchester, New Hampshire. He was buried at Elmwood Cemetery in Haverhill, Massachusetts. His memory has been preserved with the annual "Ollie Silva Classic" at Lee USA Speedway in Lee, New Hampshire. For the first event, locals built a replica of one of Silva's 1960s "Big O" coupe modifieds.

== Notable events ==
Silva once lapped the entire field twice at the 1974 Hott Wheels 100 All-Star race at the New London-Waterford Speedbowl. He was a multi-time winner of Star Speedway's International Super Modified Classic.

Silva won New England Super-Modified Racing Association (NESMRA) championships at Star Speedway in 1967, 1968, and 1978. He won Can-Am Classics championships in 1969, 1970, 1971, and 1974. Silva was the four-time champion at the U.S. Winter Nationals. Silva claimed the 1972 World Series at Thompson Speedway.

Silva's career nearly ended in 1978 when he was seriously injured while racing at Monadnock Speedway in Winchester, New Hampshire. Funds to help with medical costs were raised by some members of the Boston Bruins. He returned to racing for a short while in 1980.
