= Valenti Modified Racing Series =

Sanctioning body of modified stock car racing

Milton CAT Modified Racing Series
- Sport: Modified stock car racing
- Category: Auto racing
- Jurisdiction: United States
- Abbreviation: MRS
- Founded: 2004; 22 years ago
- Regional affiliation: New England
- Headquarters: Canaan, New Hampshire, U.S.
- President: Jack Bateman

Official website
- www.themodifiedracingseries.com
- Other key staff: Chris Grey (Operations Manager); Ben Dodge (Chief adviser); Larry Frappier (Safety director); Robert Mcilvenn (Technical director); John Spence Sr. (Public relations)

The Milton CAT Modified Racing Series, also known as the Modified Racing Series, is a modified stock car racing sanctioning body based out of Canaan, New Hampshire. The series sanctions modified races throughout New England. The cars are similar to the NASCAR Whelen Modified Tour modifieds, allowing competitors from the Whelen Modified Tour to race in the Valenti Modified Racing Series. The series draws a large number of fans and drivers to each race, earning itself a well known reputation between track owners, fans, and drivers.

== Series champions ==
Series Champions
Year	Driver
2025	Brett Meservey
2024	Matt Swanson
2023	Kirk Alexander
2022	Jacob Perry
2021	Brian Robie
2020	N/A
2019	Mike Willis
2018	Sammy Rameau
2017	Anthony Nocella
2016	Jonathan McKennedy
2015	Woody Pitkat
2014	Justin Bonsignore
2013	Rowan Pennink
2012	Jonathan McKennedy
2011	Chris Pasteryak
2010	Jonathan McKennedy
2009	Jonathan McKennedy
2008	Chris Pasteryak
2007	Kirk Alexander
2006	Dwight Jarvis
2005	Kirk Alexander
2004	Kirk Alexander
