= Claremont Motorsports Park =

Race track in New Hampshire, U.S.

- Location: 282 Thrasher Road; Claremont, New Hampshire 03743
- Coordinates: 43°23′31″N 72°21′7″W
- Owner: Ben Bosowski (2023–present)
- Operator: Mike Parks
- Opened: 1947
- Former names: Claremont Speedway (1947-2004, 2014-2019); Twin State Speedway (2004-2014)
- Major events: Current: NASCAR Whelen Modified Tour (1985, 2007, 2022, 2026); Former: NASCAR North Tour (1980–1985); ACT Late Model Tour (2009–2011); NASCAR Local Series
- Website: www.claremontmotorsportspark.com

Paved Oval (1973–present)
- Surface: Asphalt
- Length: 0.333 mi (0.536 km)
- Turns: 4

Claremont Motorsports Park, formerly known as Claremont Speedway and Twin State Speedway is a paved 0.333 mi (0.536 km) oval race track in Claremont, New Hampshire. The track is in western Claremont, north of New Hampshire Route 103.

== History ==
The track was originally built in 1947 as a 1/5 mi (0.32 km) dirt oval by Arthur Fleury, an active duty service member for the army who proposed the idea of building a racetrack in his neighborhood. It was built on the site of his father's farmland, and began hosting races that year under the name Claremont Speedway. After a few years, the track went under new management from a group known as the Jalopy Association.

In the mid-1960s, Arthur's brother Sonny Fleury took over ownership of the track. He paved the facility in 1973 as a 1/3 mi (0.54 km) oval and has been run on that surface since then. The track was briefly owned by the Claremont Owners Drivers Association (CODA) from 1980 to 1985, until it was sold back to Sonny for the 1986 season. Following Sonny's death in 1993, his daughter Sherrie and husband James Laneau took over track operations. Dennis Fleury, Sonny's nephew and Arthur's son, bought the track in 2004, renaming it Twin State Speedway.

In December 2014, Jim Ambrose, along with a group of investors, purchased the track from Dennis and renamed it back to Claremont Speedway. During Ambrose's management in 2016, he made a proposal for a smaller campground, which was approved by the Zoning Board of Adjustment on October 3.

On February 25, 2019, it was announced that Ambrose had sold the track to a New Hampshire ownership group consisting of Norman Wrenn Jr. and Ben Bosowski, renaming it Claremont Motorsports Park. They also operated other tracks in the state, including Hudson Speedway, Lee USA Speedway, and Monadnock Speedway. After only one season, Wrenn and Bosowski sold the track to focus on other racing properties. Mike Parks and MDP Motorsports Promotions began leasing the track for the 2020 season. Bosowski returned in 2023 as the sole owner and continued to lease the track occasionally to Parks.

In July 2024, the track was severely damaged following a powerful and destructive windstorm. Community members from Claremont and surrounding cities, along with several local businesses, volunteered to help with clean-up efforts, and racing activities were able to continue for that weekend's Friday events.

On August 21, 2025, it was announced that MDP Motorsports Promotions would assume full day-to-day operations of the track beginning on November 1.

== Events ==
The track currently hosts weekly racing every Friday night, with several divisions including 604 Modifieds, Ridge Runners, Six Shooters, Outlaw Late Models, Pure Stocks, and Street Stocks, with most divisions running as part of the NASCAR Weekly Series. Special event touring series that competes at the track includes Tour Type Late Models, Mini Stocks, the Northeastern Midget Association (NEMA), Nelcar Legends Cars, and the Granite State Pro Stock Series. The facility also includes a 1/8 mi (0.20 km) inner track which is used for the Claremont Motorsports Karting Series since 2010, and was formerly a 1/5 mi (0.32 km) figure-8 track.

The track hosted NASCAR North Tour races from 1980 to 1985, with Robbie Crouch winning the inaugural race. Allen Whipple, Dick McCabe, Bobby Dragon, Stub Fadden, and Chuck Bown won the remaining races that occurred there. The Valenti Modified Racing Series competed at Claremont from 2015 to 2019, the final event was won by Mike Willis Jr. The American Canadian Tour ran races from 2009 to 2011, with the last event being won by Brian Hoar.

The track was featured during the inaugural season of the NASCAR Whelen Modified Tour in 1985, with Richie Evans winning the first event. The series returned in 2007 after a long hiatus, James Civali won the race after starting fourth and leading the most laps. After another long hiatus, the series returned in 2022 and was won by eventual champion Jon McKennedy. The series will make a return to Claremont for the 2026 season.

== Races ==
=== Current ===
- Northeastern Midget Association (NEMA)
  - Butch Walsh Memorial
- Granite State Pro Stock Series
  - McGee Automotive 125
- NASCAR Whelen Modified Tour
  - Whitcomb / Granite State 85 (1985)
  - Allstate Insurance 100 (2007)
  - Clash at Claremont 150 (2022)

=== Former ===
- Valenti Modified Racing Series
  - Claremont 100
- NASCAR North Tour
  - Granite State 50 (1980–1982)
  - Claremont 100 (1981)
  - Natco Tools 100 (1982)
  - Granite State 100 (1983)
  - Wayne's Garage 100 (1984)
  - Big A Auto Parts Northeast 100 (1985)
- ACT Late Model Tour
  - Twin State 100 (2009–2011)
