= Lee USA Speedway =

Race track in the U.S. state of New Hampshire

- Location: 380 Calef Highway; Lee, New Hampshire, U.S.
- Coordinates: 43°06′58″N 71°02′24″W
- Owner: Benjamin Bosowski (2023–present); Norman Wrenn Jr. (2018–2022); Red & Judy MacDonald (1987–2018); Russ Conway, Charlie Elliot, Kenny Smith (1983–1986); Bob Bonser (1964–1983)
- Opened: 1964; 62 years ago
- Former names: Lee Speedway (1984–1995); Lee Raceway (1964–1983)
- Major events: Current: American Canadian Tour (2006, 2008–2018, 2021, 2023, 2026); Former: NASCAR Whelen Modified Tour (1993–1996, 1998, 2022–2023); NASCAR K&N Pro Series East (1992–2004, 2010)
- Website: leespeedway.com

Paved oval (1984–present)
- Surface: Asphalt
- Length: 0.375 mi (0.604 km)
- Banking: Turns: 8°

Original dirt tri-oval (1964–1983)
- Surface: Clay
- Length: 0.333 mi (0.536 km)
- Banking: Turns: 8°

Lee USA Speedway is a short-track oval race track located in Lee, New Hampshire. (Note: Lee USA Speedway should not be confused with Lee County Speedway, which is located in Donnellson, Iowa.) As of November 2026, the speedway site is listed for sale "as the former Lee Speedway property."

== History ==
The facility opened as Lee Raceway in 1964 as a dirt tri-oval, one-third of a mile (0.54 km) in length. Original owner Bob Bonser later recounted that he initially bought the land the track is located on in order to have a site along New Hampshire Route 125 to place advertising for a nudist camp that he owned and operated. Bonser paved the track the following year, and it became home to the New England Super Modified Racing Association (NESMRA). (Note: That the raceway closed in 1979 and remained dormant during 1980–1981, as recounted in on the track's website, is not supported by contemporary newspaper reports.)

In late 1983, the facility was purchased by Kenny Smith, Russ Conway, and Charlie Elliot, who had previously owned and operated Star Speedway in nearby Epping, New Hampshire. Renamed as Lee Speedway, the track was changed to be an oval, three-eighths of a mile (0.60 km) in length, and reopened in the fall of 1984. (Note: That the track reopened on July 4, 1984, as recounted on the track's website, is not supported by contemporary newspaper reports.) The first event held at the reconfigured track reportedly drew 236 entrants. A section of the original tri-oval remained in use as a pre-race staging area.

The facility was sold to Red and Judy MacDonald in December 1986. Their son, Eddie MacDonald, became a professional race car driver. Branding of the track as Lee USA Speedway dates to at least 1996. The MacDonalds operated the track until February 2018, when it was sold to Norman Wrenn Jr. of Nashua, New Hampshire. Wrenn bought Monadnock Speedway in Winchester, New Hampshire, the same year.

In 2023, the facility was sold to Benjamin Bosowski, owner of Hudson Speedway in Hudson, New Hampshire. In October 2026, the speedway was again listed for sale, at $3.5 million. The real estate listing referred to the site as "a significant land acquisition opportunity in Lee, New Hampshire. Commonly recognized as the former Lee Speedway property".

== Events ==
The track has hosted various racing events, including for NASCAR. Notable drivers who have competed at Lee include John Andretti, Gary Bettenhausen, Brett Bodine, Todd Bodine, Dale Earnhardt, Terry Labonte, Ollie Silva, and Bentley Warren. Snowmobile racing, demolition derby, and motorcycle races have also been held.

On August 20, 1973, a driver from nearby Madbury was killed in a racing accident at the track. On October 27, 1985, a driver from nearby Epping was killed in a racing accident at the track.

The track is a member of the New Hampshire Short Track Racing Association (NHSTRA). Entering the 2022 season, modified stock car racing was planned, including a NASCAR Whelen Modified Tour event.

== See also ==
- New England Dragway, located in nearby Epping
