= Riverhead Raceway =

Race track in Riverhead, New York

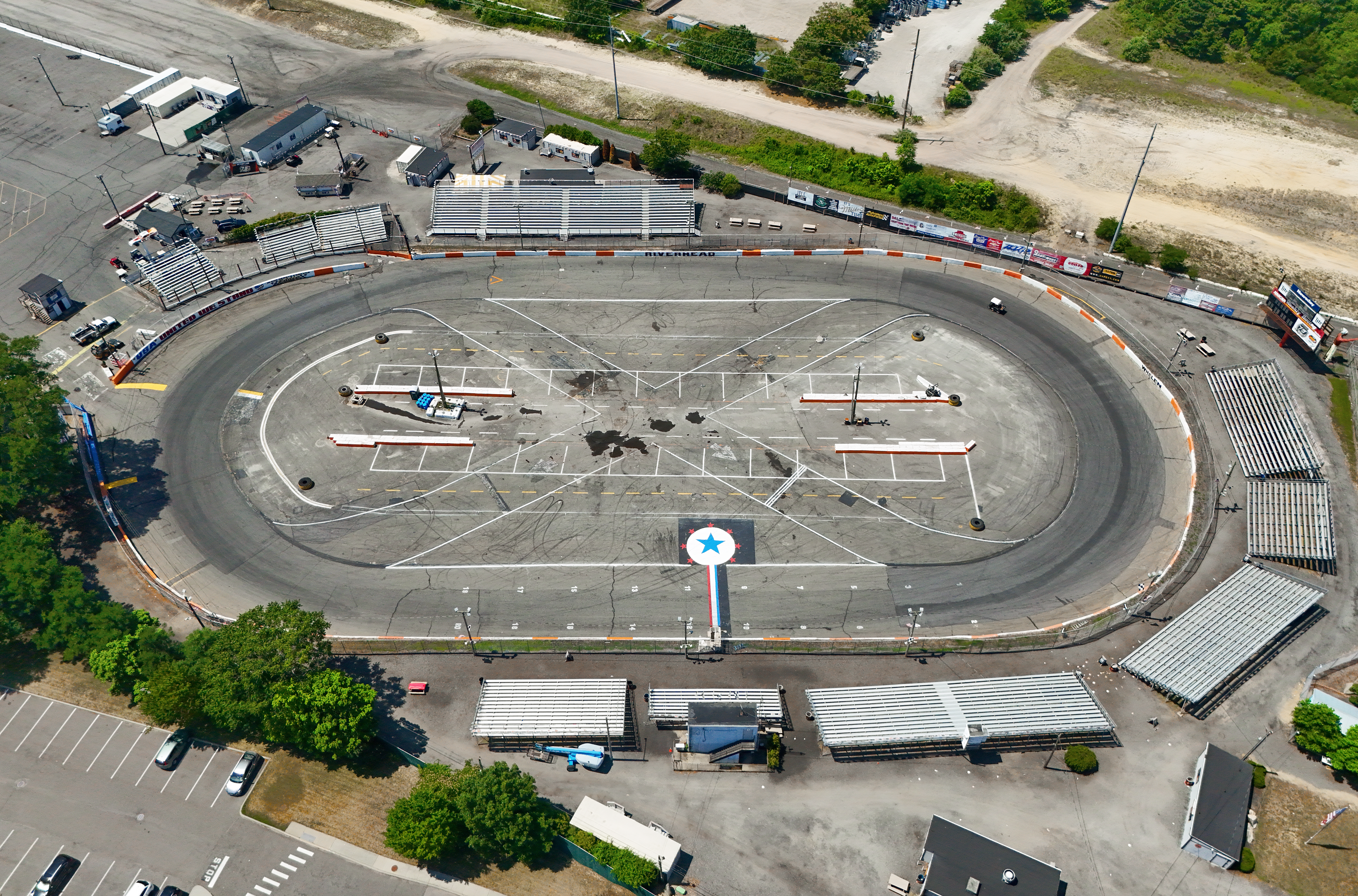
- Aerial view in 2025
- Location: Riverhead, New York
- Coordinates: 40°55′21″N 72°42′16″W
- Owner: Connie Partridge and Tom Gatz
- Broke ground: 1949
- Opened: 1951
- Major events: Current: NASCAR Whelen Modified Tour (1985–2019, 2021–present)

Paved Oval (1955–present)
- Surface: Asphalt
- Length: 0.250 mi (0.402 km)
- Turns: 4
- Banking: Turns: 12° Straights: 6°

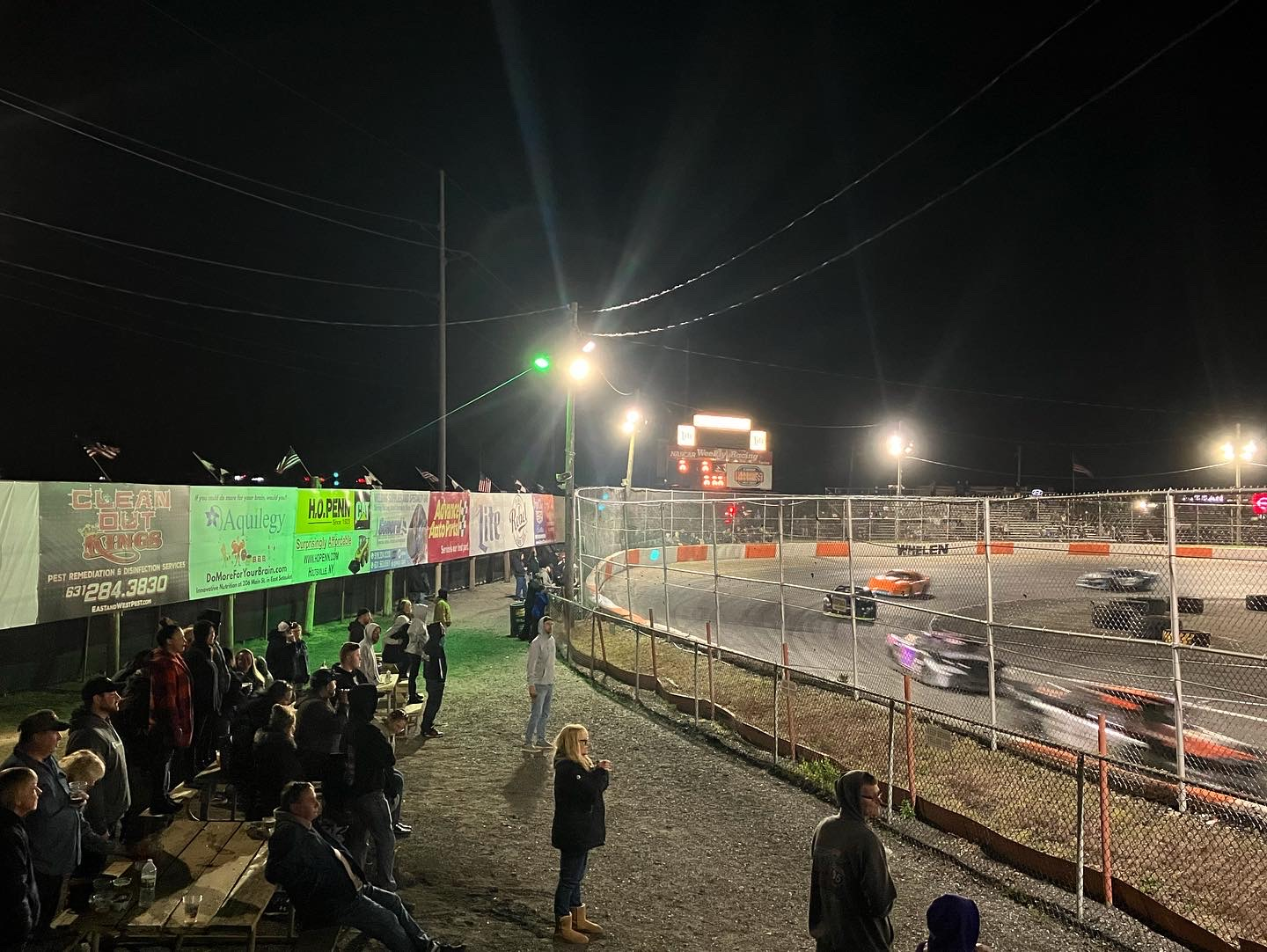
Riverhead Raceway in May 2023

Riverhead Raceway is a 0.250 mi (0.402 km) oval race track with a Figure 8 course, located in Riverhead, New York. It is the only auto racing venue on Long Island since Westhampton Raceway closed down in 2003. It started being built in 1949 and opened as a dirt track in 1951, before permanently changing to asphalt in 1955. The raceway was also well known for featuring a towering statue of a Native American, dubbed "Chief Running Fair", at its entrance until it was destroyed in 2012 due to Hurricane Sandy but rebuilt by Christmas and still standing at its original location.

== Events ==
Riverhead Raceway has seven racing divisions: Modified, Riverhead Modified Crate Figure Eight, Late Model, Blunderbust, Super Pro Truck, and Legends. It hosts races for the Whelen Modified Tour, Whelen All-American Series, and the Northeastern Midget Association. Other events include demolition derby, school bus racing, monster trucks, enduro, one-on-one spectator drags and go-karts up until the fall of 2016.

The track's signature race is the non-champion Islip 300, named for the now-defunct speedway on Long Island, which began in 2016. The open competition event allows cars run to any of four different series ("Tour Type" modifieds) specifications.

== Drivers ==
Notable drivers who used to race at Riverhead Raceway include Steve Park and his uncle Bill Park, Greg Sacks, Charlie Jarzombek, Brett Bodine, Tom Baldwin, Donny Lia, and 2013 NASCAR Whelen Modified Tour champion Ryan Preece.

== Riverhead Raceway modified champions ==
Year	Driver
2025	John Beatty Jr.
2024	John Beatty Jr.
2023	John Beatty Jr.
2022	Kyle Soper
2021	Kyle Soper
2020	Tom Rogers Jr.
2019	Kyle Soper
2018	Kyle Soper
2017	Tom Rogers Jr.
2016	Shawn Solomito
2015	Tom Rogers Jr.
2014	Howie Brode
2013	Howie Brode
2012	Shawn Solomito
2011	Justin Bonsignore
2010	Tom Rogers Jr.
2009	John Fortin
2008	Bill Park
2007	Bill Park
2006	Chuck Steuer
2005	Bill Park
2004	Tom Rogers Jr.
2003	John Fortin
2002	J. R. Bertuccio
2001	John Fortin
2000	Frank Vigliarolo Jr.
1999	Frank Vigliarolo Jr.
1998	Howie Brode
1997	Bill Park
1996	Chuck Steuer
1995	Don Howe
1994	Don Howe
1993	Don Howe
1992	Fred Harbach
1991	Wayne Anderson
1990	Wayne Anderson
1989	Dan Jivanelli
1988	Wayne Anderson
1987	Wayne Anderson
1986	John Blewett Jr.
1985	Fred Harbach
1984	Don Howe
1983	George Brunnhoelzl Jr.
1982	Wayne Anderson
1981	(no modifieds)
1980	(no modifieds)
1979	(no modifieds)
1978	Charlie Jarzombek
1977	Charlie Jarzombek
1976	Charlie Jarzombek
1975	Joe Krukowski
1974	Charlie Jarzombek
1973	Don Howe
1972	Joe Krukowski
1971	Jim Malone Sr.
1970	Jim Malone Sr.
1969	Joe Krukowski
1968	George Brunnhoelzl Sr.
1967	Charlie Jarzombek
1966	John Berkoski
1965	Tommy Washburn
1964	John Berkoski
1963	Gary Winters
1962	Gary Winters
1961	Joe Collins
1960	Norm Gimmler
1959	Buzzy Hedges
1958	Johnny Rocco
1957	Ronnie Harra
1956	Axel Anderson
1955	Tommy Washburn
1954	Tommy Washburn
1953	Ronnie Matson
1952	Bud Anderson

== Cultural references ==
Riverhead Raceway was featured as a filming location in the HBO series The Sopranos under the name "Chikamauga Raceway". It appears in Season 5, Episode 7 - "In Camelot".

== See also ==
- List of auto racing tracks in the United States
- Short track motor racing
