= Monadnock Speedway =

Race track in the U.S. state of New Hampshire

- Location: 840 Keene Rd; Winchester, New Hampshire 03470
- Coordinates: 42°49′52″N 72°21′44″W
- Owner: Norman Wrenn Jr. (2018–present)
- Operator: Michelle Cloutier
- Opened: 1971
- Major events: Current: NASCAR Whelen Modified Tour (1986–1990, 2010–2016, 2020, 2022–present); Former: NASCAR K&N Pro Series East (1988–1995); NASCAR North Tour (1979, 1982)
- Website: www.monadnockspeedway.com

Oval (1971–present)
- Surface: Asphalt
- Length: 0.250 mi (0.402 km)
- Turns: 4
- Banking: Turns 1-2: 18° Turns 3-4: 16°

Monadnock Speedway is a paved 1/4 mi (0.40 km) oval race track in Winchester, New Hampshire. Located south of Keene, the track is nestled between New Hampshire Route 10 and the Ashuelot River. Monadnock's nickname is "Mad Dog" and has been used over the years in various promotions.

The track hosts various races for regional touring series, including the Valenti Modified Racing Series, the Granite State Pro Stock Tour, the Northeastern Midget Association (NEMA) and NEMA Lites, and ISMA Supermodifieds.

== History ==
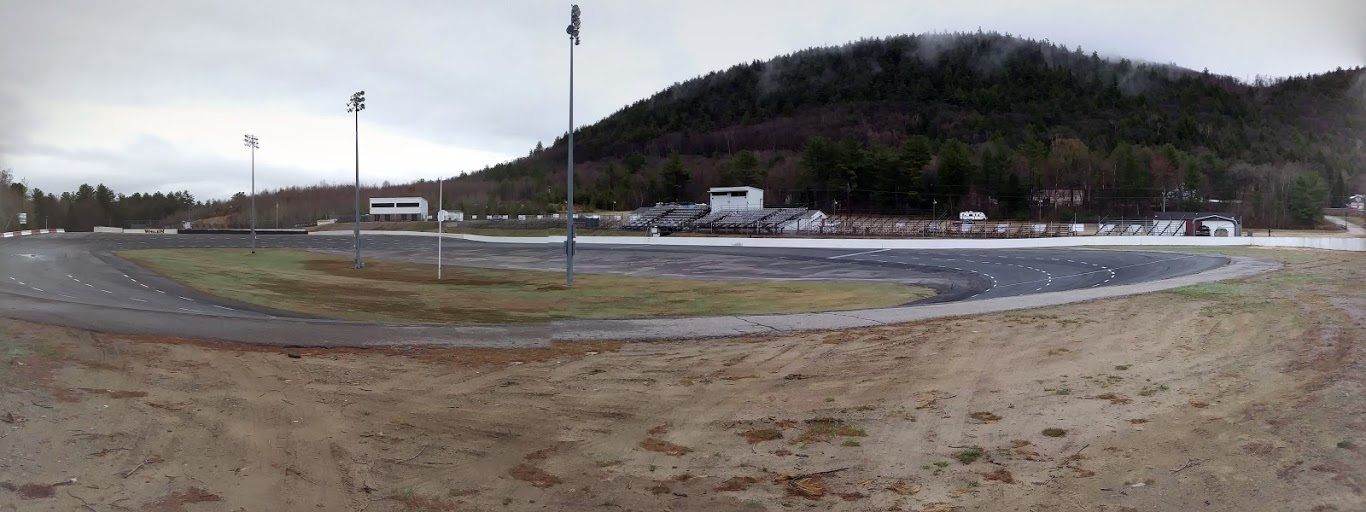
Panoramic view, April 2017

The track has been in operation since 1971, when admission was $2.50 for adults and $0.50 for children. The track was built on the site of a former gravel pit by the first owner, Bill Brown, who later sold it to Bill Davis.

Driver Ollie Silva was seriously injured and almost killed in a crash at the speedway on July 28, 1978, when his car left the track and crashed into a tree at nearly 100 miles per hour (160 km/h).

In January 1984, the venue was purchased by former driver Larry Cirillo and his business partner, Fred Pafumi. They owned and operated the track for over 30 years. In late 2018, Cirillo and Pafumi reached an agreement to sell the track to Nashua-based businessman Norman Wrenn Jr. after working out applications for various permits and licenses. Wrenn also purchased Lee USA Speedway the same year.

Improvements to the property, including replacement of all bleachers, were announced with the purchase by Wrenn. Longtime employee Michelle Cloutier was kept on as operations manager, and former racer Jeff Zuidema was brought on as a special advisor. Zuidema was previously employed as director of competition for Thompson Speedway, before stepping down in 2014.

In 2022, the Whelen Modified Series event at the speedway became part of the Whelen Granite State Short Track Cup. This promotional program promises cash awards to drivers who participate in the three races in the state at Lee USA Speedway, Monadnock Speedway, and Claremont Speedway. $5,000 is promised to the points leader, with smaller prizes for most laps led, highest average finish, and other criteria. The additional purse money totals $15,500, and is offered by regional motorsports broadcaster and promoter JDV Productions.

== Races ==
=== Current ===
- Northeastern Midget Association (NEMA)
  - Iron Mike Memorial
- Super Modified Atlantic Charter Series (SMAC)
- Granite State Pro Stock Tour
  - JBH 100
- NASCAR Whelen Modified Tour
  - Whitcomb 100 (1986)
  - Whitcomb 150 (1987–1990)
  - Monadnock 200 (2010–2011)
  - Whitcomb 200 (2012–2013)
  - O'Reilly Auto Parts 200 (2014–2015)
  - Dunleavy's Truck & Trailer Repair 200 (2016)
  - Advanced Gas Distributors Inc. 200 (2020)
  - Duel at the Dog 200 (2022)

=== Former ===
- International Supermodified Association (ISMA)
- Valenti Modified Racing Series
  - Firecracker 100
- NASCAR North Tour
  - Monadock 100 (1979)
  - Winchester 50 (1982)
- NASCAR K&N Pro Series East
  - Busch 150 (1988–1995)
