= Dylan Slepian =

American racing driver (born 1995)

- Nationality: American
- Born: April 18, 1995 (age 31) Dix Hills, New York, U.S.

NASCAR Whelen Modified Tour career
- Debut season: 2019
- Years active: 2019, 2021–2023, 2025
- Starts: 14
- Championships: 0
- Wins: 0
- Poles: 0
- Best finish: 31st in 2021
- Finished last season: 37th (2025)
- Statistics up to date as of October 24, 2025.

Dylan Slepian (born April 18, 1995) is an American professional stock car racing driver who last competed part-time in the NASCAR Whelen Modified Tour, driving the No. 63 for his own team.

Slepian has also previously competed in the NASCAR Weekly Series and the World Series of Asphalt Stock Car Racing, and is a frequent competitor at Riverhead Raceway.

== Motorsports results ==
=== NASCAR ===
(key) (Bold – Pole position awarded by qualifying time. Italics – Pole position earned by points standings or practice time. * – Most laps led.)

==== Whelen Modified Tour ====
NASCAR Whelen Modified Tour results
Year	Car owner	No.	Make	1	2	3	4	5	6	7	8	9	10	11	12	13	14	15	16	17	18	NWMTC	Pts	Ref
2019	Robert Pelis	70	Chevy	MYR	SBO	TMP	STA	WAL	SEE	TMP	RIV	NHA	STA	TMP	OSW	RIV	NHA	STA	TMP; 19			63rd	25	
2021	Robert Pelis	70	Chevy	MAR	STA	RIV; 9	JEN	OSW	RIV; 9	NHA	NRP	STA	BEE	OSW	RCH	RIV; 11	STA					31st	103	
2022	Robert Pelis	70	Chevy	NSM; 21	RCH												RIV; 24	TMP	MAR			34th	122	
2022	Robert Pelis	10	Chevy			RIV; 4	LEE	JEN	MND	RIV; 5	WAL	NHA	CLM	TMP	LGY	OSW						34th	122	
2023	Robert Pelis	10	Chevy	NSM	RCH	MON	RIV; 23	LEE	SEE	RIV	WAL	NHA	LMP	THO	LGY	OSW	MON	RIV	NWS	THO	MAR; 18	57th	47	
2025	Dylan Slepian	63	Chevy	NSM	THO; 29	NWS	SEE	RIV; 11	WMM	LMP	MON	MON	THO; 26	RCH	OSW	NHA	RIV	THO; 20	MAR			37th	90	
