= Roger Turbush =

American racing driver

- Nationality: American
- Born: April 14, 1981 (age 45) Riverhead, New York, U.S.

NASCAR Whelen Modified Tour career
- Debut season: 2017
- Years active: 2017–present
- Starts: 23
- Championships: 0
- Wins: 0
- Poles: 1
- Best finish: 33rd in 2021, 2026
- Finished last season: 33rd (2026)
- Statistics up to date as of October 12, 2026.

Roger Turbush (born April 14, 1981) is an American professional stock car racing driver who currently competes part-time in the NASCAR Whelen Modified Tour, driving the No. 88 for Heather Turbush. He is the uncle of Mark Stewart, who also competes part-time in the series.

Turbush has previously competed in series such as the EXIT Realty ProTruck Challenge, the Tri-Track Open Modified Series, and the EXIT Realty Modified Touring Series.

== Motorsports results ==
=== NASCAR ===
(key) (Bold – Pole position awarded by qualifying time. Italics – Pole position earned by points standings or practice time. * – Most laps led.)

==== Whelen Modified Tour ====
NASCAR Whelen Modified Tour results
Year	Team	No.	Make	1	2	3	4	5	6	7	8	9	10	11	12	13	14	15	16	17	18	NWMTC	Pts	Ref
2017	Danny Watts Jr.	88	Chevy	MYR	THO	STA	LGY	THO	RIV	NHA	STA	THO	BRI	SEE	OSW	RIV; 22	NHA	STA	THO			61st	22	
2018	Pat Kennedy	88	Chevy	MYR	TMP	STA	SEE	TMP	LGY	RIV; 25	NHA	STA	TMP	BRI	OSW	RIV; 16	NHA	STA	TMP			48th	47	
2019	Pat Kennedy	8	Toyota	MYR	SBO	TMP	STA	WAL	SEE	TMP	RIV; DNQ	NHA	STA	TMP	OSW	RIV; 25	NHA	STA	TMP			57th	33	
2020	JCR Motorsports	88	Chevy	JEN; 25	WMM	WMM	JEN	MND	TMP	NHA	STA	TMP										48th	19	
2021	Pat Kennedy	88	Chevy	MAR	STA	RIV; 21	JEN	OSW	RIV; Wth	NHA	NRP	STA	BEE	OSW	RCH	RIV; 3	STA					33rd	93	
2021	Pat Kennedy	81	Chevy						RIV; 15													33rd	93	
2022	Pat Kennedy	88	Chevy	NSM	RCH	RIV; 28	LEE	JEN	MND	RIV; 19	WAL	NHA	CLM	TMP	LGY	OSW						48th	72	
2022	Heather Turbush	88	Chevy														RIV; 13	TMP	MAR			48th	72	
2023	Heather Turbush	88	Chevy	NSM	RCH	MON	RIV; 24	LEE	SEE	RIV; 6	WAL	NHA	LMP	THO	LGY	OSW	MON					37th	95	
2023	Roger Turbush	88	Chevy															RIV; 7	NWS	THO	MAR	37th	95	
2024	Roger Turbush	88	Chevy	NSM	RCH	THO	MON	RIV; 16	SEE	NHA	MON	LMP	THO; 18	OSW								43rd	81	
2024	Heather Turbush	88	Chevy												RIV; 17	MON	THO	NWS	MAR			43rd	81	
2025	Roger Turbush	88	Chevy	NSM	THO; 20	NWS	SEE	RIV; 13	WMM	LMP	MON	MON	THO	RCH	OSW	NHA	RIV; 18	THO	MAR			41st	81	
2026	Roger Turbush	88	Chevy	NSM	MAR	THO	SEE	**RIV**; 15	OXF	SEE	CLM	WMM	MON	THO	NHA	STA	OSW	RIV; 9	THO; 20			33rd	89	
