= Kyle Soper =

American racing driver

- Nationality: American
- Born: April 25, 1996 (age 30) Manorville, New York, U.S.

NASCAR Whelen Modified Tour career
- Debut season: 2016
- Years active: 2015–2019, 2021–2023
- Starts: 18
- Championships: 0
- Wins: 1
- Poles: 0
- Best finish: 25th in 2021
- Finished last season: 71st (2023)
- Statistics up to date as of October 7, 2024.

Kyle Soper (born April 25, 1996) is an American professional stock car racing driver who last competed in the NASCAR Whelen Modified Tour, driving the No. 60 for Roy Hall. Soper has 4 Tour Type Modified track championships at Riverhead Raceway (2018, 2019, 2021, 2022) driving for 1994 NASCAR Whelen Modified Tour champion Wayne Anderson. In 2022, Soper pulled off the rare feat of a Riverhead weekly driver winning a NWMT race, being the first to do so since Ed Brunnhoelzl, Jr. in 1995.

Soper has previously competed in the Granite State Pro Stock Series.

== Motorsports results ==
=== NASCAR ===
(key) (Bold – Pole position awarded by qualifying time. Italics – Pole position earned by points standings or practice time. * – Most laps led.)

==== Camping World Truck Series ====
NASCAR Camping World Truck Series results
Year	Team	No.	Make	1	2	3	4	5	6	7	8	9	10	11	12	13	14	15	16	17	18	19	20	21	22	23	NCWTC	Pts	Ref
2016	FDNY Racing	28	Chevy	DAY	ATL	MAR	KAN	DOV	CLT	TEX	IOW	GTW	KEN	ELD	POC	BRI	MCH	MSP	CHI	NHA	LVS	TAL	MAR; DNQ	TEX	PHO	HOM	N/A	0	

==== Whelen Modified Tour ====
NASCAR Whelen Modified Tour results
Year	Team	No.	Make	1	2	3	4	5	6	7	8	9	10	11	12	13	14	15	16	17	18	NWMTC	Pts	Ref
2015	Tom Soper	41	Chevy	TMP	STA	WAT	STA	TMP	RIV	NHA	MON	STA	TMP	BRI	RIV	NHA	STA	TMP; 17				49th	27	
2016	Tom Soper	34	Chevy	TMP	STA	WFD	STA	TMP	RIV; 22	NHA	MND	STA	TMP	BRI	RIV; Wth	OSW	SEE	NHA	STA	TMP		51st	22	
2017	Wayne Anderson	15	Chevy	MYR	THO	STA	LGY	THO	RIV	NHA	STA	THO	BRI	SEE	OSW	RIV; 3	NHA	STA				47th	62	
2017	Wayne Anderson	48	Chevy																THO; 24			47th	62	
2018	Wayne Anderson	95	Chevy	MYR	TMP; 32	STA	SEE	TMP	LGY	RIV; 9	NHA	STA	TMP	BRI	OSW	RIV	NHA	STA	TMP			47th	47	
2019	Wayne Anderson	15	Chevy	MYR	SBO	TMP	STA	WAL	SEE	TMP	RIV	NHA	STA	TMP	OSW	RIV; 4	NHA	STA				45th	71	
2019	Wayne Anderson	95	Chevy																TMP; 13			45th	71	
2021	Wayne Anderson	15	Chevy	MAR; 25	STA	RIV; 22	JEN	OSW	RIV; 7	NHA	NRP	STA; 16	BEE	OSW	RCH	RIV; 4	STA					25th	147	
2022	Wayne Anderson	15	Chevy	NSM	RCH	RIV; 7	LEE	JEN	MND	RIV; 1	WAL	NHA	CLM	TMP	LGY	OSW	RIV; 9	TMP; 7	MAR			29th	156	
2023	Roy Hall	60	Chevy	NSM	RCH	MON	RIV; 13	LEE	SEE	RIV	WAL	NHA	LMP	THO	LGY	OSW	MON	RIV	NWS	THO	MAR	71st	31	
