= Kyle Bonsignore =

American racing driver

- Born: December 8, 1988 (age 37) Bay Shore, New York, U.S.

NASCAR Whelen Modified Tour career
- Debut season: 2015
- Current team: Kyle Bonsignore
- Years active: 2015, 2017–present
- Car number: 22
- Crew chief: Cam McDermott
- Starts: 112
- Championships: 0
- Wins: 3
- Poles: 0
- Best finish: 4th in 2021
- Finished last season: 30th (2026)
- Statistics up to date as of October 12, 2026.

Kyle Bonsignore (born December 8, 1988) is an American professional stock car racing driver who competes part-time in the NASCAR Whelen Modified Tour, driving the No. 22 for his own team.

Bonsignore is the cousin of multi-time Modified Tour champion Justin Bonsignore.

Bonsignore has also competed in series such as the now defunct NASCAR Whelen Southern Modified Tour, the Modified Racing Series, the Tri-Track Open Modified Series, and the PASS South Super Late Model Series.

== Motorsports results ==
=== NASCAR ===
(key) (Bold – Pole position awarded by qualifying time. Italics – Pole position earned by points standings or practice time. * – Most laps led.)

==== Whelen Modified Tour ====
NASCAR Whelen Modified Tour results
Year	Car owner	No.	Make	1	2	3	4	5	6	7	8	9	10	11	12	13	14	15	16	17	18	NWMTC	Pts	Ref
2015	Boehler Racing Enterprises	3	Chevy	TMP	STA	WAT	STA	TMP	RIV	NHA	MON	STA	TMP	BRI; 20	RIV	NHA	STA	TMP				51st	24	
2017	Kyle Bonsignore	22	Chevy	MYR; 19	THO	STA	LGY; 3	THO	RIV	NHA	STA	THO	BRI; 19	SEE	OSW	RIV	NHA	STA; 10	THO			33rd	126	
2018	Kyle Bonsignore	22	Chevy	MYR; 23	TMP; 34	STA; 31	SEE	TMP	LGY; 11	RIV	NHA	STA; 9	TMP	BRI	OSW	RIV	NHA	STA; 1	TMP; 15			29th	189	
2019	Kyle Bonsignore	22	Chevy	MYR; 17																		25th	220	
2019	Kyle Bonsignore	22	Toyota		SBO; 4	TMP; 14	STA; 21	WAL	SEE	TMP	RIV	NHA	STA; 21	TMP; 11	OSW	RIV	NHA	STA; 29	TMP; 15			25th	220	
2020	Kyle Bonsignore	22	Chevy	JEN; 8	WMM; 11	WMM; 2	JEN; 15	MND; 19	TMP; 20	NHA; Wth	STA; 26	TMP; 5										14th	246	
2021	Kyle Bonsignore	22	Chevy	MAR; 5	STA; 10	RIV; 4	JEN; 7	OSW; 16	RIV; 16	NHA; 9	NRP; 10	STA; 21	BEE; 7	OSW; 9	RCH; 6	RIV; 9	STA; 4					4th	484	
2022	Kyle Bonsignore	22	Chevy	NSM; 15	RCH; 20	RIV; 10	LEE; 6	JEN; 19	MND; 11	RIV; 6	WAL; 10	NHA; 2	CLM; 5	TMP; 7	LGY; 13	OSW; 4	RIV; 21	TMP; 5	MAR; 16			6th	536	
2023	Kyle Bonsignore	22	Chevy	NSM; 19	RCH; 11	MON; 8	RIV; 10	LEE; 8	SEE; 9	RIV; 4	WAL; 11	NHA; 18	LMP; 9	THO; 19	LGY; 1	OSW; 5	MON; 4	RIV; 11	NWS; 21	THO; 4	MAR; 30	5th	594	
2024	Kyle Bonsignore	22	Chevy	NSM; 11	RCH; 8	THO; 8	MON; 22	RIV; 13	SEE; 7	NHA; 2	MON; 5	LMP; 16	THO; 24	OSW; 8	RIV; 7	MON; 15	THO; 10	NWS; 10	MAR; 11			6th	530	
2025	Kyle Bonsignore	22	Chevy	NSM; 27	THO; 12	NWS; 24	SEE; 6	RIV; 6	WMM; 1*	LMP; 4	MON; 3	MON; 11	THO; 3	RCH; 14	OSW; 8	NHA; 20	RIV; 5	THO; 7	MAR; 16			7th	546	
2026	Kyle Bonsignore	22	Chevy	NSM; 27	MAR; 7	THO; 22	SEE; 19	RIV	OXF; Wth	SEE	CLM	WMM	MON	THO	NHA	STA	OSW	RIV	THO			30th	101	

==== Whelen Southern Modified Tour ====
NASCAR Whelen Southern Modified Tour results
Year	Car owner	No.	Make	1	2	3	4	5	6	7	8	9	10	11	NSWMTC	Pts	Ref
2015	Kyle Bonsignore	22	Chevy	CRW	CRW	SBO	LGY	CRW; 15	BGS	BRI	LGY	SBO; 13	CLT		25th	60	
2016	Kyle Bonsignore	22	Chevy	CRW; 15	CON; 8	SBO; 4	CRW; 6	CRW; 7	BGS; 13		ECA; 8	SBO; 2	CRW; 6	CLT; 8	7th	401	
2016	Kyle Bonsignore	22S	Chevy							**BRI**; 7					7th	401	

=== SMART Modified Tour ===
SMART Modified Tour results
Year	Car owner	No.	Make	1	2	3	4	5	6	7	8	9	10	11	12	13	SMTC	Pts	Ref
2026	Kyle Bonsignore	22	N/A	FLO	AND	SBO	DOM	HCY	WKS	FCR	CRW	PUL	CAR	ROU	TRI; Wth	NWS; 24	71st	17	
