= Matt Brode =

American racing driver

- Nationality: American
- Born: October 4, 2004 (age 22) East Islip, New York, U.S.

NASCAR Whelen Modified Tour career
- Debut season: 2022
- Years active: 2022–present
- Starts: 10
- Championships: 0
- Wins: 0
- Poles: 1
- Best finish: 44th in 2026
- Finished last season: 44th (2026)
- Statistics up to date as of October 12, 2026.

Matthew Brode (born August 16, 2002) is an American professional stock car racing driver who currently competes part-time in the NASCAR Whelen Modified Tour, driving the No. 96 for Peter Clark Motorsports. He is the son of former racing driver Howie Brode, who also competed in the Modified Tour.

Brode has also competed in the Modified Racing Series and the NASCAR Weekly Series, and is longtime competitor at Riverhead Raceway, having first raced there when he was five years old.

== Motorsports results ==
=== NASCAR ===
(key) (Bold – Pole position awarded by qualifying time. Italics – Pole position earned by points standings or practice time. * – Most laps led.)

==== Whelen Modified Tour ====
NASCAR Whelen Modified Tour results
Year	Car owner	No.	Make	1	2	3	4	5	6	7	8	9	10	11	12	13	14	15	16	17	18	NWMTC	Pts	Ref
2022	Peter Clark Motorsports	96	Chevy	NSM	RCH	RIV; 27	LEE	JEN	MND	RIV; 13	WAL	NHA	CLM	TMP	LGY	OSW	RIV; 19	TMP	MAR			47th	73	
2023	Peter Clark Motorsports	96	Chevy	NSM	RCH	MON	RIV; 22	LEE	SEE	RIV	WAL	NHA	LMP	THO	LGY	OSW	MON	RIV; 18	NWS	THO	MAR	55th	48	
2024	Peter Clark Motorsports	96	Chevy	NSM	RCH	THO	MON	RIV; 27	SEE	NHA	MON	LMP	THO	OSW	RIV	MON	THO	NWS	MAR			66th	17	
2025	Peter Clark Motorsports	96	Chevy	NSM	THO	NWS	SEE	RIV; 16	WMM	LMP	MON	MON	THO	RCH	OSW	NHA	**RIV**; 9	THO	MAR			47th	65	
2026	Peter Clark Motorsports	96	Chevy	NSM	MAR	THO	SEE	RIV; 22	OXF	SEE	CLM	WMM	MON	THO	NHA	STA	OSW	RIV; 22	THO			44th	44	
