= Eddie McCarthy =

American racing driver (born 1992)

- Nationality: American
- Born: November 11, 1992 (age 33) Brick, New Jersey, U.S.

NASCAR Whelen Modified Tour career
- Debut season: 2020
- Years active: 2020–2024
- Starts: 14
- Championships: 0
- Wins: 0
- Poles: 0
- Best finish: 31st in 2022
- Finished last season: 68th (2024)
- Statistics up to date as of April 23, 2025.

Edward McCarthy (born November 11, 1992) is an American professional stock car racing driver who has previously competed in the NASCAR Whelen Modified Tour and the SMART Modified Tour.

McCarthy has also previously competed in the World Series of Asphalt Stock Car Racing.

== Motorsports results ==
=== NASCAR ===
(key) (Bold – Pole position awarded by qualifying time. Italics – Pole position earned by points standings or practice time. * – Most laps led.)

==== Whelen Modified Tour ====
NASCAR Whelen Modified Tour results
Year	Car owner	No.	Make	1	2	3	4	5	6	7	8	9	10	11	12	13	14	15	16	17	18	NWMTC	Pts	Ref
2020	Edward McCarthy Jr.	20	Chevy	JEN; 22	WMM	WMM	JEN	MND	TMP	NHA	STA	TMP										46th	22	
2021	Edward McCarthy Jr.	20	Chevy	MAR	STA	RIV	JEN	OSW	RIV	NHA	NRP	STA	BEE	OSW	RCH; 14	RIV	STA					53rd	30	
2022	Ed McCarthy	20	Chevy	NSM; 20	RCH; 23	RIV	LEE	JEN	MND	RIV	WAL; 14	NHA; 14	CLM	TMP	LGY	OSW	RIV	TMP	MAR; 14			31st	135	
2023	Ed McCarthy	20	Chevy	NSM; 29	RCH; 27	MON	RIV	LEE	SEE	RIV	WAL; 3	NHA; 20	LMP	THO	LGY	OSW	MON	RIV	NWS; 38	THO	MAR; 17	32nd	130	
2024	Ed McCarthy	20	Chevy	NSM; 34	RCH	THO	MON	RIV	SEE	NHA	MON	LMP	THO	OSW	RIV	MON	THO	NWS	MAR			68th	10	

=== SMART Modified Tour ===
SMART Modified Tour results
Year	Car owner	No.	Make	1	2	3	4	5	6	7	8	9	10	11	12	13	14	SMTC	Pts	Ref
2025	Ed McCarthy	20	N/A	FLO	AND	SBO; 9	ROU	HCY	FCS	CRW	CPS	CAR	CRW	DOM	FCS	TRI	NWS; 7	33rd	66	
