= Max McLaughlin =

American racing driver (born 2000)

- Born: February 29, 2000 (age 26); Mooresville, North Carolina, U.S.
- Achievements: 2021 DIRTcar Nationals Champion; 2020 North-South Shootout Winner

NASCAR O'Reilly Auto Parts Series career
- 1 race run over 1 year
- 2023 position: 66th
- Best finish: 66th (2023)
- First race: 2023 Shriners Children's 200 at The Glen (Watkins Glen)
Wins	Top tens	Poles
0	0	0

NASCAR FedEx Freight Truck Series career
- 1 race run over 1 year
- 2018 position: 66th
- Best finish: 66th (2018)
- First race: 2018 Eldora Dirt Derby (Eldora)
Wins	Top tens	Poles
0	0	0

ARCA Menards Series career
- 5 races run over 1 year
- Best finish: 21st (2020)
- First race: 2020 Calypso Lemonade 200 (IRP)
- Last race: 2020 Bush's Beans 200 (Bristol)
Wins	Top tens	Poles
0	5	0

ARCA Menards Series East career
- 16 races run over 2 years
- First race: 2019 New Smyrna 175 (New Smyrna)
- Last race: 2020 Bush's Beans 200 (Bristol)
- First win: 2019 Great Outdoors RV Superstore 100 (Watkins Glen)
Wins	Top tens	Poles
1	11	2

World of Outlaws Case Construction Late Model Series career
- Debut season: 2021
- Current team: Team 22
- Car number: No. 22
- Starts: 30
- Wins: 1
- Poles: 0
- Best finish: 237th in 2021
- Statistics up to date as of September 10, 2024.

Max McLaughlin (born February 29, 2000) is an American professional stock car racing and dirt track racing driver. He currently competes full-time in the World of Outlaws Case Construction Late Model Series, driving the No. 22 Longhorn Chassis for Team 22 and part-time in the Super DIRTcar Big-Block Modified Series, driving the No. 8 for Heinke-Baldwin Racing. He has also previously competed in the NASCAR Xfinity Series, NASCAR Truck Series, ARCA Menards Series, ARCA Menards Series East and NASCAR Whelen Modified Tour. He is the son of former NASCAR driver Mike McLaughlin.

== Racing career ==
On February 2, 2018, it was announced that McLaughlin would be driving part-time for Niece Motorsports in the No. 38 truck. He finished twelfth in his first start at Eldora, which ended up being his only start with the team.

In 2019, McLaughlin joined Hattori Racing Enterprises for his first full asphalt racing season in the NASCAR K&N Pro Series East, driving the No. 1 Toyota Camry. McLaughlin won his first career race at Watkins Glen International. In October 2020, McLaughlin won in a Big Block dirt modified Super DIRTcar Series race at Weedsport Speedway.

For 2021, McLaughlin decided to put more focus on his dirt racing efforts and would therefore not run another full season in the East Series. On January 13, McLaughlin revealed that he would run part-time in the Truck Series for Hattori in 2021 in a new part-time second truck for the team. However, he did not end up running any Truck Series races that year.

On February 28, 2023, it was announced that McLaughlin would make his Xfinity Series debut in the race at Watkins Glen in the No. 96 car for the new FRS Racing team. He would qualify the part-time car into the race and finish 34th after suffering a crash late in the race.

In 2024, McLaughlin would run full-time in the World of Outlaws Late Model Series in the No. 22 for G.R. Smith. He would pick up his first win in just his fifth start in April at the Talladega Short Track.

== Personal life ==
He is the son of former NASCAR driver Mike McLaughlin.

== Motorsports career results ==
=== NASCAR ===
(key) (Bold – Pole position awarded by qualifying time. Italics – Pole position earned by points standings or practice time. * – Most laps led. ** – All laps led.)

==== Xfinity Series ====
NASCAR Xfinity Series results
Year	Team	No.	Make	1	2	3	4	5	6	7	8	9	10	11	12	13	14	15	16	17	18	19	20	21	22	23	24	25	26	27	28	29	30	31	32	33	NXSC	Pts	Ref
2023	FRS Racing	96	Chevy	DAY	CAL	LVS	PHO	ATL	COA	RCH	MAR	TAL	DOV	DAR	CLT	PIR	SON	NSH	CSC	ATL	NHA	POC	ROA	MCH	IRC	GLN; 34	DAY	DAR	KAN	BRI	TEX	ROV	LVS	HOM	MAR	PHO	66th	3	

==== Camping World Truck Series ====
NASCAR Camping World Truck Series results
Year	Team	No.	Make	1	2	3	4	5	6	7	8	9	10	11	12	13	14	15	16	17	18	19	20	21	22	23	NCWTC	Pts	Ref
2018	Niece Motorsports	38	Chevy	DAY	ATL	LVS	MAR	DOV	KAN	CLT	TEX	IOW	GTW	CHI	KEN	ELD; 12	POC	MCH	BRI	MSP	LVS	TAL	MAR	TEX	PHO	HOM	66th	25	

==== Whelen Modified Tour ====
NASCAR Whelen Modified Tour results
Year	Car owner	No.	Make	1	2	3	4	5	6	7	8	9	10	11	12	13	14	15	16	17	18	NWMTC	Pts	Ref
2020	Mike Curb	77	Chevy	JEN	WMM	WMM	JEN	MND	TMP	NHA	STA; 4	TMP										38th	40	
2021	Mike Curb	77	Chevy	MAR; 4	STA; 11	RIV	JEN; 11	**OSW**; 11	RIV	NHA; 30	NRP; 3	STA	BEE	OSW	RCH	RIV	STA					22nd	196	
2022	Mike Curb	77	Chevy	NSM	RCH; 12	RIV	LEE	JEN; 7	MND	RIV	WAL	NHA	CLM	TMP	LGY	OSW	RIV	TMP	MAR; 26			39th	88	
2023	Mike Curb	77	Chevy	NSM	RCH; 3	MON	RIV	LEE	SEE	RIV	WAL	NHA; 17	LMP; 11	THO	LGY; 8	OSW	MON	RIV	NWS	THO	MAR; 8	28th	174	

=== ARCA Menards Series ===
(key) (Bold – Pole position awarded by qualifying time. Italics – Pole position earned by points standings or practice time. * – Most laps led.)

ARCA Menards Series results
Year	Team	No.	Make	1	2	3	4	5	6	7	8	9	10	11	12	13	14	15	16	17	18	19	20	AMSC	Pts	Ref
2020	Hattori Racing Enterprises	1	Toyota	DAY	PHO	TAL	POC	IRP; 6	KEN	IOW; 7	KAN	TOL	TOL	MCH	DAY; 7	GTW; 4	L44	TOL	BRI; 3	WIN	MEM	ISF	KAN	21st	194	

==== ARCA Menards Series East ====
ARCA Menards Series East results
Year	Team	No.	Make	1	2	3	4	5	6	7	8	9	10	11	12	AMSEC	Pts	Ref
2019	Hattori Racing Enterprises	1	Toyota	NSM; 11	BRI; 13	SBO; 3	SBO; 3	**MEM**; 6*	NHA; 4	IOW; 10	**GLN**; 1**	BRI; 7	GTW; 19		DOV; 6	5th	440	
2019	Hattori Racing Enterprises	51	Toyota											NHA; 13		5th	440	
2020	Hattori Racing Enterprises	1	Toyota	NSM; 10	TOL; 12	DOV; 4	TOL	BRI; 3	FIF							12th	148	

=== SMART Modified Tour ===
SMART Modified Tour results
Year	Car owner	No.	Make	1	2	3	4	5	6	7	8	9	10	11	12	13	SMTC	Pts	Ref
2022	Curb Racing	77	N/A	FLO	SNM; 2	CRW	SBO	FCS	CRW	NWS; 29	NWS; 8	CAR	DOM	HCY	TRI	PUL	36th	30	

^{*} Season still in progress
