= Jimmy Blewett =

American racing driver (born 1980)

- Nationality: American
- Born: August 26, 1980 (age 46) Howell, New Jersey, U.S.
- Relatives: John Blewett III (brother)

NASCAR Whelen Modified Tour career
- Debut season: 2001 NASCAR Featherlite Modified Tour
- Current team: Greshow Motorsports
- Car number: 2
- Crew chief: Mike Bologna
- Starts: 130
- Wins: 6
- Poles: 3
- Best finish: 6th in 2016
- Finished last season: 57th (2026)
- Statistics up to date as of October 12, 2026.

James Robert Blewett (born August 26, 1980) is an American professional stock car racing driver who currently competes part-time in the NASCAR Whelen Modified Tour, driving the No. 2 for Greshow Motorsports. He has also previously competed in the SMART Modified Tour. He is the younger brother of the late John Blewett III, who also raced in modifieds.

== Career ==
Blewett is a long-time competitor of the NASCAR Whelen Modified Tour, having made his debut in the series in 2001. In 2006, he won his first NASCAR Whelen Modified Tour race at the Made in America Whelen 300 at Martinsville Speedway, leading all 20 laps.

On August 16, 2007, Blewett and his brother John were involved in an accident while racing for the lead during a NASCAR Whelen Modified Tour race at Thompson International Speedway. John Blewett died in the accident from blunt force head and neck trauma.

Blewett was sidelined for the 2025 racing season due to complications from diverticulitis. Later that year, Blewett was named one of NASCAR Whelen Modified Tour's 40 greatest drivers.

== Motorsports career results ==
=== NASCAR ===
(key) (Bold – Pole position awarded by qualifying time. Italics – Pole position earned by points standings or practice time. * – Most laps led.)

==== Whelen Modified Tour ====
NASCAR Whelen Modified Tour results
Year	Car owner	No.	Make	1	2	3	4	5	6	7	8	9	10	11	12	13	14	15	16	17	18	19	20	NWMTC	Pts	Ref
2001	Curt Chase	76	Chevy	SBO	TMP	STA	WFD	NZH	STA	RIV	SEE	RCH	NHA	HOL	RIV	CHE; 9	TMP	STA	WFD	TMP	STA	MAR	TMP; DNQ	71st	175	
2002	Curt Chase	77	Pontiac	TMP	STA	WFD	NZH	RIV	SEE	RCH; 42	STA	BEE												62nd	189	
2002	Curt Chase	78	Chevy										NHA; 18	RIV	TMP; DNQ	STA	WFD	TMP	NHA	STA	MAR	TMP		62nd	189	
2003	Curt Chase	76	Chevy	TMP	STA	WFD	NZH; 32	STA	LER	BLL; 4	BEE	NHA	ADI	RIV	TMP	STA	WFD	TMP	NHA	STA	TMP			52nd	227	
2004	John Blewett	66	Chevy	TMP	STA	WFD	NZH; 32	STA	RIV	LER	BLL; 29	BEE	NHA	SEE	RIV	STA	TMP	WFD	TMP	NHA	STA	TMP		73rd	143	
2005	Ed Partridge	12	Dodge	TMP	STA	RIV; 20	WFD	STA	JEN				RIV; 18	STA; 22	TMP; 12									32nd	867	
2005	Ed Partridge	12	Chevy							NHA; 30	BEE	SEE				WFD	MAR	TMP; 33	NHA; 25	STA; 13	TMP; 27			32nd	867	
2006	Ed Partridge	12	Chevy	TMP; 20	STA; 29	JEN; 17	TMP; 14	STA; 2*	NHA; 42	HOL; 9	RIV; DNQ	STA; 24	TMP; 5	MAR; 1	TMP; 32	NHA; 11	WFD; 28	**TMP**; 2	STA; 30					15th	1754	
2007	Ed Partridge	12	Chevy	TMP; 4	STA; 9	WTO; 1*	STA; 13	TMP; 8	NHA; 30	TSA; 10	RIV; 12	STA; 9	TMP; 15	MAN	MAR; 29	NHA; 5	TMP; 15	STA; 16	TMP; 26					8th	1883	
2008	Ed Partridge	19	Chevy	TMP; 12	STA; 23	STA; 31	TMP; 29	NHA; 13	SPE; 4	RIV; 1*	STA; 1	TMP; 25	MAN; 2	TMP; 26	NHA; 2	MAR; 20	CHE; 21	STA; 13	**TMP**; 15					9th	1969	
2009	Ed Partridge	12	Chevy	TMP; 2	STA; 9	**STA**; 1*	NHA; 28	SPE; 22	RIV; 12	STA; 8	BRI; 19	TMP	NHA	MAR	STA	TMP								23rd	1039	
2010	Dick Barney	14	Chevy	TMP; 15	STA; 15	STA; 2	MAR; 30					STA; 26	TMP; 15	BRI	NHA; 2	STA; 20	TMP; 31							23rd	1103	
2010	Dick Barney	14	Ford					NHA; 30	LIM	MND	RIV													23rd	1103	
2011	Dick Barney	14	Chevy	TMP; DNQ	STA; 18	STA; 31	MND	TMP	NHA; 29	RIV		NHA; 29	BRI	DEL										29th	629	
2011	John Blewett	76	Chevy								STA; 10				TMP; 20	LRP	NHA	STA	TMP					29th	629	
2012	John Blewett	76	Chevy	TMP; 4	STA; 5	MND; 13	STA; 9	WFD; 13	NHA; 16	STA; 2	TMP; 7	BRI; 15	TMP; 20	RIV; 12	NHA; 23	**STA**; 3	TMP; 16							8th	459	
2013	John Blewett	76	Chevy	TMP; 6	STA; 8	STA; 9	WFD; 12	RIV	**NHA**; 21	MND	STA	TMP; 7	BRI	RIV	NHA	STA	TMP							24th	201	
2016	Robert Garbarino	4	Dodge	TMP; 8	STA; 31	WFD; 3	STA; 2	TMP; 9	RIV; 4	NHA; 20	MND; 3	STA; 1	TMP; 14		RIV; 6	OSW	SEE; 7	NHA; 7	STA; 3	TMP; 3				6th	574	
2016	Robert Garbarino	41	Dodge											BRI; 14										6th	574	
2017	John Blewett	76	Chevy	MYR	THO; 24	STA	LGY	THO	RIV	NHA	STA	THO	BRI	SEE	OSW	RIV	NHA	STA	THO; 19					53rd	45	
2018	Ed Partridge	6	Chevy	MYR; 2																				33rd	168	
2018	Starrett Racing	76	Chevy		THO; 28			THO; 14	LGY	RIV	NHA	STA; 8	THO	BRI	OSW	RIV	NHA	STA; 14	THO					33rd	168	
2018	Eddie Harvey	1	Chevy			STA; 32	SEE																	33rd	168	
2019	Joseph Bertuccio	21	Chevy	MYR; 3	SBO; 3	TMP; 10	STA; 15	WAL; 12	SEE; 19	TMP; 30	RIV; 11	NHA; 22	STA; 7	TMP; 6	OSW	RIV	NHA	STA	TMP					18th	346	
2022	Jon Bertuccio	21	Chevy	NSM; 13																				27th	166	
2022	Tommy Baldwin Racing	7	Chevy		RCH; 7	RIV	LEE	JEN	MND	RIV	WAL; 1	NHA	CLM	**TMP**; 21	LGY	OSW	RIV	TMP	MAR; 17					27th	166	
2023	John Blewett	76	Chevy	NSM; 28	RCH	MON	RIV	LEE	SEE	RIV	WAL; 22	NHA	LMP	THO	LGY	OSW	MON	RIV	NWS	THO	MAR			65th	38	
2026	Gershow Motorsports	2	N/A	NSM; 25	MAR; Wth	THO	SEE	RIV	OXF	SEE	CLM	WMM	MON	THO	NHA	STA	OSW	RIV	THO					57th	19	

=== SMART Modified Tour ===
SMART Modified Tour results
Year	Car owner	No.	Make	1	2	3	4	5	6	7	8	9	10	11	12	13	14	SMTC	Pts	Ref
2022	Tommy Baldwin Racing	7NYB	N/A	FLO	SNM	CRW	SBO	FCS	CRW	NWS; 7	NWS; 9	CAR	DOM	HCY	TRI	PUL		N/A	0	
2024	Jamie Tomaino	99	N/A	FLO; 6	CRW; 4		TRI; 2*	ROU; 2	HCY; 8	FCS; 15	CRW; 14	JAC; 18	CAR; 13	CRW; 7	DOM; 2	SBO; 18	NWS	11th	404	
2024	N/A	76	N/A			SBO; DNS												11th	404	
2026	Phil Stefanelli	17	N/A	FLO	AND	SBO; 27												30th	79	
2026	Gershow Motorsports	2NY	N/A				DOM; 29	HCY	WKS	FCR	CRW							30th	79	
2026	Factory 39 Racing	39	N/A									PUL; 14	CAR	ROU	TRI			30th	79	
2026	N/A	21NY	N/A													NWS; 15		30th	79	
