= Andrew Krause =

American racing driver (born 1990)

- Nationality: American
- Born: May 2, 1990 (age 36) Holmdel, New Jersey, U.S.

NASCAR Whelen Modified Tour career
- Debut season: 2016
- Current team: Diane Krause
- Years active: 2016–present
- Car number: 24
- Crew chief: Steven Reed
- Starts: 73
- Championships: 0
- Wins: 0
- Poles: 1
- Best finish: 19th in 2022
- Finished last season: 35th (2026)
- Statistics up to date as of October 12, 2026.

Andrew Krause (born May 2, 1990) is an American professional stock car racing driver who competes part-time in the NASCAR Whelen Modified Tour, driving the No. 24 for Diane Krause. Krause's family currently operates Wall Stadium, a high banked 1/4 Mile oval in Wall Township, New Jersey.

Krause has also competed in series such as the Tri-Track Open Modified Series, the Modified Racing Series, the SMART Modified Tour, and the World Series of Asphalt Stock Car Racing.

== Motorsports results ==
=== NASCAR ===
(key) (Bold – Pole position awarded by qualifying time. Italics – Pole position earned by points standings or practice time. * – Most laps led.)

==== Whelen Modified Tour ====
NASCAR Whelen Modified Tour results
| Year | Car owner | No. | Make | 1 | 2 | 3 | 4 | 5 | 6 | 7 | 8 | 9 | 10 | 11 | 12 | 13 | 14 | 15 | 16 | 17 | 18 | NWMTC | Pts | Ref |
|---|---|---|---|---|---|---|---|---|---|---|---|---|---|---|---|---|---|---|---|---|---|---|---|---|
| 2016 | Clifford Krause | 24 | Chevy | TMP; 21 | STA; 19 | WFD; 23 | STA; 19 | TMP; 17 | RIV | NHA; 23 | MND | STA; 13 | TMP; 22 | BRI | RIV | OSW | SEE; Wth | NHA | STA; Wth | TMP; Wth | | 27th | 195 | |
| 2017 | Clifford Krause | 24 | Chevy | MYR | THO; 16 | STA; 26 | LGY | THO; 9 | RIV | NHA; 16 | STA; 12 | THO; 6 | BRI | SEE; 23 | OSW | RIV | NHA; 16 | STA; 13 | THO; 6 | | | 20th | 297 | |
| 2018 | Diane Krause | 24 | Toyota | MYR | TMP; 14 | STA; Wth | SEE; 13 | TMP; 18 | LGY | RIV | NHA; 16 | STA | | | | | | STA; 28 | TMP; 27 | | | 30th | 185 | |
| 2018 | Diane Krause | 24 | Chevy | | | | | | | | | | TMP; 7 | BRI | OSW | RIV | NHA | | | | | 30th | 185 | |
| 2019 | Diane Krause | 24 | Chevy | MYR | SBO | TMP; 27 | STA | | | | | | | | | | | | | | | 29th | 180 | |
| 2019 | Diane Krause | 24 | Toyota | | | | | WAL; 17 | SEE; 10 | TMP; 18 | RIV | NHA; 18 | STA | TMP; 7 | OSW | RIV | NHA | STA | **TMP**; 33 | | | 29th | 180 | |
| 2020 | Diane Krause | 24 | Chevy | JEN; 33 | WMM; 24 | WMM | JEN; 24 | MND | TMP; Wth | | | | | | | | | | | | | 34th | 51 | |
| 2020 | Kyle Bonsignore | 24 | Chevy | | | | | | | NHA; Wth | STA | TMP | | | | | | | | | | 34th | 51 | |
| 2021 | Diane Krause | 24 | Chevy | MAR; 32 | STA; 7 | RIV | JEN | OSW; 12 | RIV | NHA; 17 | NRP | STA; 15 | BEE | OSW; 7 | RCH; 20 | RIV | STA | | | | | 21st | 199 | |
| 2022 | Diane Krause | 24 | Chevy | NSM; 29 | RCH; 18 | RIV | LEE | JEN; 4 | MND | RIV | WAL; 4* | NHA | CLM | TMP; 22 | LGY | OSW; 10 | RIV | TMP | MAR; 6 | | | 19th | 217 | |
| 2023 | Diane Krause | 24 | Chevy | NSM; 25 | RCH; 16 | MON; 22 | RIV | LEE | SEE | RIV | WAL; 5 | NHA | LMP | THO; 18 | LGY | OSW | MON | RIV | NWS; 27 | THO; 7 | MAR; 9 | 20th | 243 | |
| 2024 | Diane Krause | 24 | Chevy | NSM; 8 | RCH; 13 | THO; 22 | MON | RIV | SEE | NHA | MON | LMP | THO; 11 | OSW; 17 | RIV | MON | THO | NWS; 20 | MAR; 9 | | | 17th | 209 | |
| 2025 | Diane Krause | 24 | Chevy | NSM; 10 | THO; 18 | NWS | SEE | RIV | WMM | LMP | MON | MON | THO; 19 | RCH; 24 | OSW | NHA | RIV | THO; 26 | MAR; Wth | | | 29th | 123 | |
| 2026 | Diane Krause | 24 | Chevy | NSM; 28 | MAR; 30 | THO; 20 | SEE | RIV | OXF | SEE | CLM | WMM | MON | THO; 22 | NHA | STA | OSW | RIV | THO | | | 35th | 77 | |

=== SMART Modified Tour ===
SMART Modified Tour results
| Year | Car owner | No. | Make | 1 | 2 | 3 | 4 | 5 | 6 | 7 | 8 | 9 | 10 | 11 | 12 | 13 | 14 | SMTC | Pts | Ref |
|---|---|---|---|---|---|---|---|---|---|---|---|---|---|---|---|---|---|---|---|---|
| 2023 | N/A | 24 | N/A | FLO | CRW | SBO | HCY | FCS | CRW | ACE | CAR | PUL; 3 | TRI | SBO | ROU | | | 40th | 38 | |
| 2024 | N/A | 9 | N/A | FLO | CRW | SBO; 25 | TRI | ROU | HCY | FCS | CRW | JAC | CAR | CRW | DOM | SBO | | 49th | 29 | |
| 2024 | N/A | 24NJ | N/A | | | | | | | | | | | | | | NWS; 27 | 49th | 29 | |
