= Tyler Rypkema =

American racing driver (born 1997)

- Born: February 3, 1997 (age 29) Owego, New York, U.S.

NASCAR Whelen Modified Tour career
- Debut season: 2018
- Current team: Boehler Racing Enterprises
- Years active: 2018–present
- Car number: 3
- Crew chief: Greg Fournier
- Starts: 102
- Championships: 0
- Wins: 1
- Poles: 2
- Best finish: 4th in 2023
- Finished last season: 6th (2026)
- Statistics up to date as of October 12, 2026.

Tyler Rypkema (born February 3, 1997) is an American professional stock car racing driver who competes full-time in the NASCAR Whelen Modified Tour, driving the No. 3 for Boehler Racing Enterprises.

== Racing career ==
Rypkema has previously competed in series such as the Race of Champions Late Model Series, the Race of Champions Asphalt Modified Tour, the Race of Champions Asphalt Sportsman Modified Series, the Race of Champions TQ Midget Series, and the World Series of Asphalt Stock Car Racing.

In 2025, Rypkema scored his first NASCAR Whelen Modified Tour win at New Hampshire Motor Speedway.

== Motorsports career results ==
=== NASCAR ===
(key) (Bold – Pole position awarded by qualifying time. Italics – Pole position earned by points standings or practice time. * – Most laps led.)

==== Whelen Modified Tour ====
NASCAR Whelen Modified Tour results
Year	Car owner	No.	Make	1	2	3	4	5	6	7	8	9	10	11	12	13	14	15	16	17	18	NWMTC	Pts	Ref
2018	Dean Rypkema	32	Chevy	MYR	TMP	STA	SEE	TMP	LGY	RIV	NHA	STA	TMP	BRI	OSW; 14	RIV	NHA	STA	TMP			53rd	30	
2019	Dean Rypkema	32	Chevy	MYR	SBO	TMP	STA; 23	WAL	SEE	TMP	RIV	NHA; 23	STA	TMP	OSW; 20	RIV	NHA	STA; 33	TMP; 27			41st	94	
2020	Dean Rypkema	32	Chevy	JEN; 18	WMM; 22	WMM; 13	JEN; 8	MND; 12	TMP; 10	NHA; 10	STA; 10	TMP; 10										9th	283	
2021	Dean Rypkema	32	Chevy	MAR; 2	STA; 24	RIV; 15	JEN; 20	OSW; 7	RIV; 10	NHA; 21	NRP; 6	STA; 12	BEE; 13	OSW; 14	RCH; 12	RIV; 12	STA; 7					9th	442	
2022	Dean Rypkema	32	Chevy	NSM; 5	RCH; 5	RIV	LEE	**JEN**; 2*	MND	RIV; 12	WAL	NHA; 19	CLM	TMP; 14	LGY	OSW; 24	RIV	TMP; 18	MAR; 22			18th	278	
2023	Dean Rypkema	32	Chevy	NSM; 11	RCH; 19	MON; 11	RIV; 4	LEE; 15	SEE; 13	RIV; 7	WAL; 14	NHA; 15	LMP; 12	THO; 10	LGY; 6	OSW; 8	MON; 11	RIV; 9	NWS; 12	THO; 16	**MAR**; 5	4th	595	
2024	Dean Rypkema	32	Chevy	NSM; 7	RCH; 17	THO; 5	MON; 21	RIV; 26	SEE	NHA; 11	MON	LMP; 17	THO; 12	OSW; 10								10th	440	
2024	Boheler Racing Enterprises	3	Chevy												RIV; 3	MON; 13	THO; 13	NWS; 5	MAR; 16			10th	440	
2025	Boheler Racing Enterprises	3	Chevy	NSM; 11	THO; 15	NWS; 19	SEE; 21	RIV; 9	WMM; 11	LMP; 6	MON; 6	MON; 21	THO; 13	RCH; 13	OSW; 11	NHA; 1	RIV; 11	THO; 9	MAR; 6			9th	526	
2026	Boheler Racing Enterprises	3	Chevy	NSM; 2	MAR; 3	THO; 10	SEE; 22	RIV; 24	OXF; 2	SEE; 13	CLM; 11	WMM; 4	MON; 2	THO; 10	NHA; 4	STA; 12	OSW; 3	RIV; 4	THO; 13			6th	566	
