= Melissa Fifield =

American auto racing driver

- Nationality: American
- Born: Melissa Fifield; August 7, 1992 (age 34) Wakefield, New Hampshire, U.S.

NASCAR Whelen Modified Tour career
- Debut season: 2014
- Current team: Pine Knoll Racing
- Years active: 2014–2024
- Car number: 01
- Engine: Chevrolet
- Crew chief: Jake Marosz
- Starts: 158
- Championships: 0
- Wins: 0
- Poles: 0
- Best finish: 11th in 2023
- Finished last season: 15th (2024)

Awards
- 2014-2016 NASCAR Whelen Modified Tour Most Popular Driver (3 times)
- Statistics up to date as of August 27, 2024.

Melissa Fifield (born August 7, 1992) is an American racing driver and spokesperson. She primarily raced in the NASCAR Whelen Modified Tour from 2014 to 2024, driving the No. 01 Chevrolet for her family-owned team. She won NASCAR Whelen Modified tour most popular driver for three consecutive years.

== Racing career ==
Fifield grew up watching races with her family at a young age. She received her first go-kart at eleven years old, and competed in nearby racetracks. She won the Londonderry Track Championship in her rookie season, and eventually drove in the World Karting Association, where she ranked fourth in the national standings. She drove in the Allison Legacy Series at fourteen years old, racing in the North and South series. She had her first and only Legacy Series win at the New London-Waterford Speedbowl in 2011.

=== NASCAR Whelen Modified Tour ===
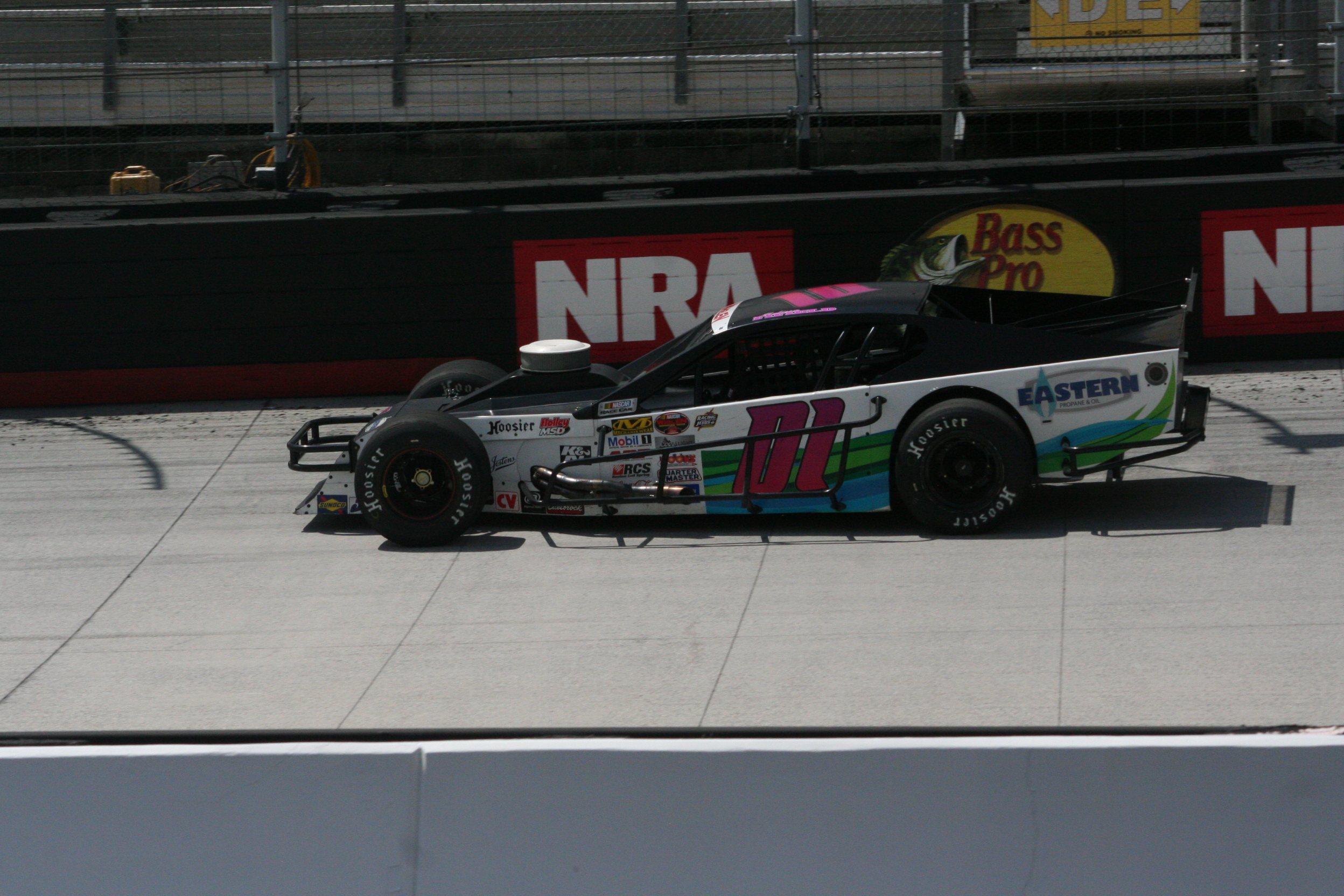
Fifield at Bristol Motor Speedway in 2015

==== 2014–present ====
Fifield moved up to the NASCAR Whelen Modified Tour full-time in 2014, racing for her family-owned team. She recorded her season best finish of nineteenth at Thompson Speedway and New Hampshire Motor Speedway. She finished 21st in the final point standings and won the Most Popular Driver Award that season.

Throughout her career in the Whelen Modified Tour, she would always start each race, with most of them being ended early from mechanical issues. She failed to finish a single race in 2021 through fourteen attempts. Her career-best finish is fifteenth, attained twice; once at Wall Stadium in 2019 and once at Lancaster Motorplex in 2024. 2023 marked a significant uptick in her performance, finally starting to finish more races than she DNFed. This change led to eighteen top-twenty finishes in two seasons, as compared to her 23 prior top-twenties through nine seasons.

After making 117 consecutive race attempts, she did not enter the Monadnock Speedway race set for September 21st, 2024. Skipping two races, she raced at North Wilkesboro Speedway, finishing eighteenth, before again skipping the final race of the season. The reasoning for this was made clear when on October 24th, 2024, Melissa announced that she had been diagnosed with breast cancer. Keeping her own health in mind, she decided to take a hiatus from racing. July 13th of 2025 marked her return. She raced in the SMART Modified Tour race at Caraway Speedway, finishing nineteenth.

=== Criticism ===
From 2014 to 2016, Fifield won the Whelen Modified Tour Most Popular Driver award, and would often get criticized on social media, due to her driving performance and being behind the pace. Fifield said, "I've never had anybody make a comment at a pit party or off the track or anything there. Everybody kind of just has the courage to say what they want on the computer, but they'll never say it to your face. People don't have the courage to say something."

== Personal life ==
Fifield is currently a spokesperson for the New Hampshire Office of Highway Safety. Because of her efforts, she received a commendation from New Hampshire governor Chris Sununu in 2017. Sununu stated that she is "one of the best race car drivers in the world, and one of the top few female race car drivers in the world lives right here in New Hampshire and she doesn't get nearly the recognition she deserves."

Fifield was featured on the cover of New Hampshire Women Magazine in September 2018, which talks about her NASCAR career.

She also worked with the Children's Hospital at Dartmouth-Hitchcock Medical Center (CHaD), where she would interview high school students about making good decisions in life, and their future goals.

Fifield currently runs and operates Pine Knoll Auto Sales, a car dealership in her hometown of Wakefield, New Hampshire, which is also the location of her race shop.

On February 14, 2022, Anheuser-Busch brands announced the formation of a new program, called the Busch Light Accelerate Her Program, a program that allows female drivers who are 21 years old or older, to get more funding, track time, media exposure, and training for NASCAR. Fifield is one of the recipients for the program.

== Motorsports career results ==
=== NASCAR ===
(key) (Bold – Pole position awarded by qualifying time. Italics – Pole position earned by points standings or practice time. * – Most laps led.)

==== Whelen Modified Tour ====
NASCAR Whelen Modified Tour results
Year	Car owner	No.	Make	1	2	3	4	5	6	7	8	9	10	11	12	13	14	15	16	17	18	NWMTC	Pts	Ref
2014	Kenneth Fifield	01	Chevy	TMP; 19	STA; 20	STA; 22	WFD; 27	RIV; 30	NHA; 29	MND; 23	STA; 22	TMP; 24	BRI	NHA; 19	STA; 20	TMP; 22						21st	251	
2015	Kenneth Fifield	01	Chevy	TMP; 29	STA; 29	WFD; 32	STA; 30	TMP; 28	RIV; DNQ	NHA; 23	MND; 27	STA; 22	TMP; 29	BRI; DNQ	RIV; 27	NHA; 31	STA; 27	TMP; 25				25th	239	
2016	Kenneth Fifield	01	Chevy	TMP; 27	STA; 27	WFD; 28	STA; 22	TMP; 19	RIV; 27	NHA; 31	MND; 22	STA; 22	TMP; 23	BRI; 18	RIV; 29	OSW	SEE; 26	NHA; 25	STA; 20	TMP; 19		23rd	341	
2017	Kenneth Fifield	01	Chevy	MYR; 27	TMP; 23	STA; 24	LGY; 21	TMP; 19	RIV; 24	NHA; 22	STA; 28	TMP; 25	BRI; 21	SEE; 27	OSW; 21	RIV; 23	NHA; 20	STA; 22	TMP; 30			15th	337	
2018	Kenneth Fifield	01	Chevy	MYR; 25	TMP; 30	STA; 20	SEE; 22	TMP; 28	LGY; 22	RIV; 30	NHA; 30	STA; 28	TMP; 26	BRI; 21	OSW; 20	RIV; 20	NHA; 25	STA; 24	TMP; 31			22nd	302	
2019	Kenneth Fifield	01	Chevy	MYR; 27	SBO; 24	TMP; 26	STA; 33	WAL; 15	SEE; 27	TMP; 29	RIV; DNQ	NHA; 26	STA; 31	TMP; 30	OSW; 26	RIV; 29	NHA; 31	STA; 31	TMP; 29			23rd	261	
2020	Kenneth Fifield	01	Chevy	JEN; 27	WMM; 31	WMM; 27	JEN; 25	MND; 28	TMP; 25	NHA; 30	STA; 27	TMP; 20										22nd	156	
2021	Kenneth Fifield	01	Chevy	MAR; 27	STA; 26	RIV; 26	JEN; 16	OSW; 24	RIV; 25	NHA; 28	NRP; 20	STA; 22	BEE; 19	OSW; 18	RCH; 22	RIV; 26	STA; 26					16th	291	
2022	Kenneth Fifield	01	Chevy	NSM; 30	RCH; 27	RIV; 30	LEE; 19	JEN; 21	MND; 25	RIV; 26	WAL; 27	NHA; 23	CLM; 20	TMP; 18	LGY; 18	OSW; 25	RIV; 22	TMP; 24	MAR; 28			15th	321	
2023	Kenneth Fifield	01	Chevy	NSM; 33	RCH; 20	MON; 26	RIV; 21	LEE; 20	SEE; 17	RIV; 22	WAL; 16	NHA; 28	LMP; 16	THO; 15	LGY; 15	OSW; 18	MON; 18	RIV; 12	NWS; 28	THO; 22	MAR; 35	11th	410	
2024	Kenneth Fifield	01	Chevy	NSM; 25	RCH; 20	THO; 16	MON; 20	RIV; 29	SEE; 23	NHA; 29	MON; 19	LMP; 15	THO; 27	OSW; 20	RIV; 19	MON	THO	NWS; 18	MAR			15th	292	

==== Whelen Southern Modified Tour ====
NASCAR Whelen Southern Modified Tour results
Year	Car owner	No.	Make	1	2	3	4	5	6	7	8	9	10	NSWMTC	Pts	Ref
2015	Kenneth Fifield	01	Chevy	CRW	CRW	SBO	LGY	CRW	BGS	BRI; DNQ	LGY	SBO	CLT	N/A	-	

=== SMART Modified Tour ===
SMART Modified Tour results
Year	Car owner	No.	Make	1	2	3	4	5	6	7	8	9	10	11	12	13	14	SMTC	Pts	Ref
2025	Kenneth Fifield	01	N/A	FLO	AND	SBO	ROU	HCY	FCS	CRW; 19	CPS	CAR	CRW; 16	DOM	FCS	TRI; 27	NWS; 17	28th	85	
2026	Kenneth Fifield	01	N/A	FLO	AND	SBO	DOM	HCY; 22	WKS	FCR	CRW; 15	PUL	CAR	ROU	TRI; Wth	NWS; 22		34th	64	
