= Matt Galko =

American racing driver (born 1993)

- Nationality: American
- Born: October 25, 1993 (age 33) Meriden, Connecticut, U.S.

NASCAR Whelen Modified Tour career
- Debut season: 2019
- Years active: 2019–2021
- Starts: 4
- Championships: 0
- Wins: 0
- Poles: 0
- Best finish: 43rd in 2021
- Statistics up to date as of November 21, 2025.

Matt Galko (born October 25, 1993) is an American professional stock car racing driver who competed in the NASCAR Whelen Modified Tour from 2019 to 2021. Galko works as an engineer for Joe Gibbs Racing.

Galko has also previously competed in series such as the Modified Racing Series, the Tri-Track Open Modified Series, and the World Series of Asphalt Stock Car Racing. He is also a former SK Light champion at Stafford Motor Speedway, having won back-to-back titles in 2010 and 2011.

== Motorsports results ==
=== NASCAR ===
(key) (Bold – Pole position awarded by qualifying time. Italics – Pole position earned by points standings or practice time. * – Most laps led.)

==== Whelen Modified Tour ====
NASCAR Whelen Modified Tour results
Year	Car owner	No.	Make	1	2	3	4	5	6	7	8	9	10	11	12	13	14	15	16	NWMTC	Pts	Ref
2019	Steve Mendoza	55	Dodge	MYR	SBO	TMP	STA	WAL	SEE	TMP	RIV	NHA	STA	TMP	OSW	RIV	NHA	STA; 12	TMP	59th	32	
2020	Steve Mendoza	59	Dodge	JEN	WMM	WMM	JEN	MND	TMP	NHA	STA; 23	TMP								47th	21	
2021	Steve Mendoza	59	Dodge	MAR	STA; 19	RIV	JEN	OSW	RIV	NHA; 18	NRP	STA	BEE	OSW	RCH	RIV	STA			43rd	51	
