= Jake Johnson (racing driver) =

American racing driver (born 2002)

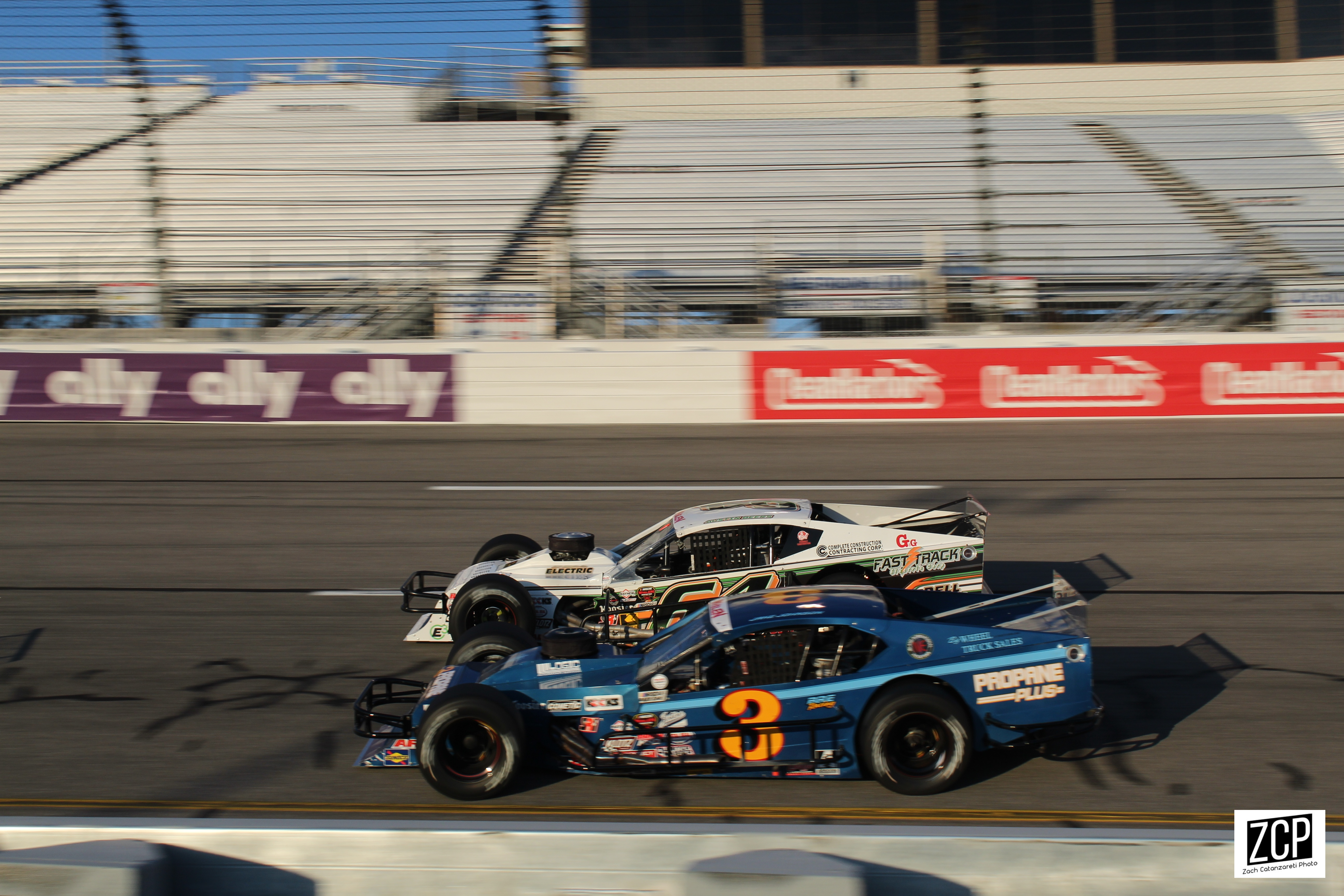
- Johnson's No. 3 car at Richmond Raceway in 2024
- Nationality: American
- Born: December 24, 2002 (age 23) Rehoboth, Massachusetts, U.S.

NASCAR Whelen Modified Tour career
- Debut season: 2022
- Years active: 2022–2025
- Former teams: Boehler Racing Enterprises
- Starts: 33
- Championships: 0
- Wins: 1
- Poles: 3
- Best finish: 9th in 2023
- Finished last season: 25th (2025)
- Statistics up to date as of October 24, 2025.

Jake Johnson (born December 24, 2002) is an American professional stock car racing driver who last competed part-time in the NASCAR Whelen Modified Tour, driving the No. 07 for JMA Motorsports.

Johnson made his debut in the series in 2022, driving the No. 3 for Boehler Racing Enterprises while driving a partial schedule, where he earned four top-tens with a best finish of third at Claremont Speedway. He then ran in all but five races with the team in 2023, where he finished ninth in the points with seven top-ten finishes and won rookie of the year honors. He was retained by the team the following year to run full-time. He won his first win in the series that year at Monadnock Speedway, giving the No. 3 its first win since 2017. However, in August of that year, it was revealed that Johnson and the team had parted ways, and that Johnson would sit out the remainder of the season and the whole of the following year to focus on school and personal responsibilities.

Johnson has also competed in series such as the ACT Late Model Tour, the PASS North Super Late Model Series, the Modified Racing Series, the Tri-Track Open Modified Series, and the NELCAR Legends Tour. His biggest win came in the 2020 Snowflake 100 at Five Flags Speedway during the Snowball Derby weekend, which was an upset victory as not many New England racers have had much success at the event.

== Motorsports results ==
=== Stock car career summary ===
| Season | Series | Team | Races | Wins | Top 5 | Top 10 | Points | Position |
|---|---|---|---|---|---|---|---|---|
| 2022 | NASCAR Whelen Modified Tour | Boehler Racing Enterprises | 6 | 0 | 2 | 4 | 193 | 21st |
| 2023 | NASCAR Whelen Modified Tour | Boehler Racing Enterprises | 13 | 0 | 1 | 7 | 443 | 9th |
| 2024 | NASCAR Whelen Modified Tour | Boehler Racing Enterprises | 10 | 1 | 3 | 8 | 355 | 14th |
| 2025 | CARS Pro Late Model Tour | N/A | 1 | 0 | 0 | 1 | 34 | 55th |
| 2025 | NASCAR Whelen Modified Tour | JMA Motorsports | 4 | 0 | 3 | 3 | 143 | 25th |
| 2026 | CARS Pro Late Model Tour | Lins Propane Truck Racing | 2 | 0 | 1 | 1 | 63 | 28th |

=== NASCAR ===
(key) (Bold – Pole position awarded by qualifying time. Italics – Pole position earned by points standings or practice time. * – Most laps led.)

==== Whelen Modified Tour ====
NASCAR Whelen Modified Tour results
| Year | Car owner | No. | Make | 1 | 2 | 3 | 4 | 5 | 6 | 7 | 8 | 9 | 10 | 11 | 12 | 13 | 14 | 15 | 16 | 17 | 18 | NWMTC | Pts | Ref |
|---|---|---|---|---|---|---|---|---|---|---|---|---|---|---|---|---|---|---|---|---|---|---|---|---|
| 2022 | Boehler Racing Enterprises | 3 | Chevy | NSM | RCH | RIV; 24 | **LEE**; 5 | JEN | MND; 7 | RIV | WAL; 26 | NHA | **CLM**; 3 | TMP | LGY; 8 | OSW | RIV | TMP | MAR | | | 21st | 193 | |
| 2023 | Boehler Racing Enterprises | 3 | Chevy | NSM; 6 | RCH | MON; 14 | RIV; 8 | LEE; 7 | SEE; 19 | RIV | WAL; 18 | NHA; 10 | LMP | THO; 12 | LGY; 7 | OSW | MON; 7 | RIV; 14 | NWS; 16 | THO; 2 | MAR | 9th | 433 | |
| 2024 | Boehler Racing Enterprises | 3 | Chevy | NSM; 9 | RCH; 5 | THO; 2 | MON; 1 | RIV; 6 | SEE; 9 | NHA; 8 | MON; 14 | LMP; 9 | THO; 26 | OSW | RIV | MON | THO | NWS | MAR | | | 14th | 355 | |
| 2025 | JMA Motorsports | 07 | Chevy | NSM | THO; 26 | NWS | SEE; 4 | RIV | **WMM**; 3 | LMP | MON | MON | THO; 4 | RCH | OSW | NHA | RIV | THO | MAR | | | 25th | 143 | |

=== CARS Pro Late Model Tour ===
(key)

CARS Pro Late Model Tour results
| Year | Team | No. | Make | 1 | 2 | 3 | 4 | 5 | 6 | 7 | 8 | 9 | 10 | 11 | 12 | 13 | CPLMTC | Pts | Ref |
|---|---|---|---|---|---|---|---|---|---|---|---|---|---|---|---|---|---|---|---|
| 2025 | N/A | 17J | N/A | AAS | CDL | OCS | ACE | NWS | CRW | HCY | HCY | AND | FLC | SBO | TCM | NWS; 9 | 55th | 34 | |
| 2026 | Lins Propane Truck Racing | 15J | Ford | SNM | NSV | CRW | ACE; 2 | NWS | HCY | AND | FLC | TCM; 19 | NPS | SBO | | | 28th | 63 | |
