= Jon McKennedy =

American racing driver

- Nationality: American
- Born: April 15, 1987 (age 39) Chelmsford, Massachusetts, U.S.

NASCAR Whelen Modified Tour career
- Debut season: 2006
- Current team: JMR - Jon McKennedy Racing
- Years active: 2006–present
- Car number: 79
- Crew chief: Patrick Walsh
- Starts: 123
- Wins: 6
- Poles: 5
- Best finish: 1st in 2022
- Finished last season: 3rd (2026)

Championship titles
- NASCAR Whelen Modified Tour
- Statistics up to date as of October 12, 2026.

Jonathan McKennedy (born April 5, 1987) is an American race car driver who competes full-time in the NASCAR Whelen Modified Tour, driving the No. 79 for his own team. He is a former champion of the series, having won it in 2022.

McKennedy has won nine championships in Tour-Type Modifieds and Supermodifieds.

== Career ==
McKennedy began racing at the age of nine. Since starting his career, he has won multiple Karting championships. McKennedy has won 83 races at 25 tracks from Canada to Florida.

Former NASCAR team owner Tommy Baldwin Jr. won his first NASCAR Whelen Modified Tour race with McKennedy, at Myrtle Beach Speedway in 2018. At the time, Baldwin called him "an awesome talent.”

In 2009, McKennedy was ranked third by Vermont Motorsports Magazine.

== Championships ==
- 2003 350 Supermodified champion at Star Speedway
- 4x Modified Racing Series champion (2009, 2010, 2012, and 2016). 24 wins, second all-time wins.
- 4x ISMA Ollie Silva Memorial winner (2012, 2014, 2019, and 2020) at Lee USA Speedway.
- 4x ISMA Star Classic winner (2013, 2018, 2020, and 2021) at Star Speedway.
- 2014 & 2025 Tri-Track Open Modified Series champion
- 2015 ISMA Hy-Miler Classic winner at Sandusky Speedway
- 2016 Northeast Premier Touring Series Driver of the Year
- 2017 ISMA champion
- 2018 First NASCAR Whelen Modified Tour win at Myrtle Beach Speedway and North/South Shootout Winner at Concord Motorsports Park
- 2020 Finished 2nd in NASCAR Whelen Modified Tour championship standings
- 2022 NASCAR Whelen Modified Tour Champion

== Motorsports career results ==
=== NASCAR ===
(key) (Bold – Pole position awarded by qualifying time. Italics – Pole position earned by points standings or practice time. * – Most laps led.)

==== Whelen Modified Tour ====
NASCAR Whelen Modified Tour results
| Year | Car owner | No. | Make | 1 | 2 | 3 | 4 | 5 | 6 | 7 | 8 | 9 | 10 | 11 | 12 | 13 | 14 | 15 | 16 | 17 | 18 | NWMTC | Pts | Ref |
|---|---|---|---|---|---|---|---|---|---|---|---|---|---|---|---|---|---|---|---|---|---|---|---|---|
| 2006 | Chris Geoffroy | 73 | Chevy | TMP; 10 | STA; DNQ | JEN; 10 | TMP; DNQ | STA; DNQ | NHA; 26 | HOL; 14 | RIV | STA; 29 | TMP; 13 | MAR; DNQ | TMP; 18 | NHA; 34 | WFD | TMP; DNQ | STA; 32 | | | 30th | 1090 | |
| 2007 | Chris Geoffroy | 73 | Chevy | TMP; 8 | STA; DNQ | WTO; 26 | STA; 23 | TMP; DNQ | NHA | TSA; 9 | RIV | STA | TMP | MAN | MAR | | | | | | | 34th | 745 | |
| 2007 | Bear Motorsports | 13 | Dodge | | | | | | | | | | | | | NHA; 17 | TMP; 33 | STA | TMP | | | 34th | 745 | |
| 2009 | Joe Brady | 00 | Chevy | TMP | STA | STA | NHA; 35 | SPE | RIV | STA | BRI | TMP | | | | | | | | | | 55th | 116 | |
| 2009 | Art Barry | 21 | Chevy | | | | | | | | | | NHA; 35 | MAR | STA | TMP | | | | | | 55th | 116 | |
| 2012 | Roger Hill | 79 | Pontiac | TMP | STA | MND; 23 | STA; 18 | WFD; 10 | NHA; 26 | STA; 7 | TMP; 14 | BRI; 7 | TMP; 22 | RIV; 21 | NHA | STA | TMP | | | | | 23rd | 248 | |
| 2015 | Jon McKennedy | 29 | Chevy | TMP; 18 | STA | WFD; 27 | STA | TMP | RIV | NHA | MND | STA | TMP | BRI | RIV | NHA | STA | TMP | | | | 46th | 43 | |
| 2017 | Brian Brady | 00 | Chevy | MYR | TMP | STA | LGY | TMP; 27 | RIV | NHA | STA; 5 | TMP; 9 | BRI | SEE; 24 | OSW | RIV | | STA; 14 | TMP | | | 27th | 196 | |
| 2017 | Ed Partridge | 6 | Chevy | | | | | | | | | | | | | | NHA; 11 | | | | | 27th | 196 | |
| 2018 | Tommy Baldwin Racing | 7 | Chevy | MYR; 1 | TMP; 20 | STA; 6 | SEE; 25 | TMP; 29 | LGY | RIV | NHA; 11 | STA; 23 | TMP; 12 | BRI | OSW; 15 | RIV | NHA; 8 | STA; 26 | TMP; 2 | | | 18th | 357 | |
| 2019 | Tommy Baldwin Racing | 7 | Chevy | MYR; 2* | SBO; 16 | TMP; 17 | STA | WAL | SEE | TMP; 17 | RIV | **NHA**; 4 | STA; 2 | TMP; 4 | OSW | RIV | NHA; 2 | STA | TMP | | | 20th | 295 | |
| 2020 | Tommy Baldwin Racing | 7 | Chevy | JEN; 3 | WMM; 9 | **WMM**; 4* | JEN; 6 | **MND**; 9 | TMP; 3 | NHA; 8 | STA; 6 | TMP; 2* | | | | | | | | | | 2nd | 352 | |
| 2021 | Tommy Baldwin Racing | 7 | Chevy | MAR; 11 | STA; 6 | RIV; 16 | JEN; 6 | OSW; 20 | RIV; 8 | NHA; 5 | **NRP**; 4* | STA; 3 | BEE; 16 | OSW; 16 | RCH; 2 | RIV | STA; 12 | | | | | 8th | 450 | |
| 2022 | Tim Lepine | 79 | Chevy | NSM; 4 | RCH; 8 | RIV; 17 | LEE; 2 | JEN; 6 | MND; 18 | RIV; 4 | WAL; 8 | NHA; 5 | CLM; 1 | TMP; 4 | LGY; 4 | OSW; 6 | RIV; 10 | TMP; 6 | MAR; 12 | | | 1st | 597 | |
| 2023 | Tim Lepine | 79 | Chevy | NSM; 24 | RCH; 9 | MON; 2 | RIV; 3 | LEE; 2 | SEE; 7 | RIV | WAL | NHA | LMP | THO | LGY | | | | | | | 19th | 254 | |
| 2023 | Mike Curb | 77 | Chevy | | | | | | | | | | | | | OSW; 7 | MON | RIV | NWS | THO | MAR | 19th | 254 | |
| 2024 | Jon McKennedy | 79 | Chevy | NSM | RCH | THO | MON; 23 | RIV | SEE | NHA; 23 | MON | LMP | THO; 4 | OSW | RIV | MON; 21 | THO; Wth | NWS | MAR | | | 35th | 105 | |
| 2025 | Jon McKennedy | 79 | Chevy | NSM | **THO**; 8 | NWS | SEE; 15 | RIV | WMM; 9 | LMP | MON | MON; Wth | THO; 23 | RCH | OSW | NHA; 10 | RIV | THO | MAR | | | 22nd | 159 | |
| 2026 | Jon McKennedy | 79 | Chevy | NSM; 6 | MAR; 27 | THO; 4* | SEE; 1 | RIV; 8 | OXF; 1* | SEE; 9 | CLM; 3 | WMM; 12 | MON; 8 | THO; 24 | NHA; 1 | STA; 6 | OSW; 2 | RIV; 12 | THO; 12 | | | 3rd | 585 | |

Sporting positions
| Preceded by Justin Bonsignore | NASCAR Whelen Modified Tour Champion; 2022 | Succeeded by Ron Silk |
