= 2022 NASCAR Whelen Modified Tour =

38th season of the NASCAR Whelen Modified Tour

The 2022 NASCAR Whelen Modified Tour was the thirty-eighth season of the NASCAR Whelen Modified Tour, a stock car racing tour sanctioned by NASCAR. It began with the New Smyrna Visitors Bureau 200 at New Smyrna Speedway on February 12 and ended with the Virginia is for Racing Lovers 200 at Martinsville Speedway on October 27.

Justin Bonsignore entered the season as the defending series champion. Jon McKennedy won his first championship in the series in 2022.

== Schedule ==
On November 3, 2021, NASCAR announced the 2022 Whelen Modified Tour schedule. There are 16 scheduled races for the season which includes an inaugural stop at New Smyrna Speedway.

No.	Race title	Track	Date
1	New Smyrna Visitors Bureau 200	New Smyrna Speedway, New Smyrna Beach, Florida	February 12
2	Virginia is for Racing Lovers 150	Richmond Raceway, Richmond, Virginia	April 1
3	Miller Lite 200	Riverhead Raceway, Riverhead, New York	May 14
4	Granite State Derby	Lee USA Speedway, Lee, New Hampshire	May 21
5	Jennerstown Salutes 150	Jennerstown Speedway, Jennerstown, Pennsylvania	May 28
6	Duel at the Dog 200	Monadnock Speedway, Winchester, New Hampshire	June 18
7	Buzz Chew Chevrolet Cadillac 200	Riverhead Raceway, Riverhead, New York	June 25
8	Jersey Shore 150	Wall Stadium, Wall Township, New Jersey	July 9
9	Whelen 100	New Hampshire Motor Speedway, Loudon, New Hampshire	July 16
10	Clash at Claremont 150	Claremont Motorsports Park, Claremont, New Hampshire	July 29
11	Phoenix Communications 150	Thompson Speedway, Thompson, Connecticut	August 17
12	CheckeredFlag.com 150	Langley Speedway, Hampton, Virginia	August 27
13	Toyota - Bud Mod Classic 150	Oswego Speedway, Oswego, New York	September 3
14	Eddie Partridge 256	Riverhead Raceway, Riverhead, New York	September 17
15	Phoenix Communications 150	Thompson Speedway, Thompson, Connecticut	October 8
16	Virginia is for Racing Lovers 200	Martinsville Speedway, Ridgeway, Virginia	October 27

== Results and standings ==
=== Race results ===
No.	Race	Pole position	Most laps led	Winning driver	Manufacturer	Report
1	New Smyrna Visitors Bureau 200	Matt Hirschman	Matt Hirschman	Matt Hirschman	Chevrolet	Report
2	Virginia is for Racing Lovers 150	Justin Bonsignore	Tommy Catalano	Justin Bonsignore	Chevrolet	Report
3	Miller Lite 200	Timmy Solomito	Doug Coby	Doug Coby	Chevrolet	Report
4	Granite State Derby	Jake Johnson	Matt Hirschman	Doug Coby	Chevrolet	Report
5	Jennerstown Salutes 150	Tyler Rypkema	Tyler Rypkema	Mike Christopher Jr.	Chevrolet	Report
6	Duel at the Dog 200	Justin Bonsignore	Ron Silk	Justin Bonsignore	Chevrolet	Report
7	Buzz Chew Chevrolet Cadillac 200	Ron Silk	Timmy Solomito	Kyle Soper	Chevrolet	Report
8	Jersey Shore 150	Ron Silk	Andrew Krause	Jimmy Blewett	Chevrolet	Report
9	Whelen 100	Justin Bonsignore	Donny Lia	Anthony Nocella	Chevrolet	Report
10	Clash at Claremont 150	Jake Johnson	Jon McKennedy	Jon McKennedy	Chevrolet	Report
11	Phoenix Communications 150	Jimmy Blewett	Craig Lutz	Craig Lutz	Chevrolet	Report
12	CheckeredFlag.com 150	Doug Coby	Doug Coby	Doug Coby	Chevrolet	Report
13	Toyota - Bud Mod Classic 150	Matt Hirschman	Doug Coby	Justin Bonsignore	Chevrolet	Report
14	Eddie Partridge 256	Justin Bonsignore	Justin Bonsignore	Justin Bonsignore	Chevrolet	Report
15	Phoenix Communications 150	Ronnie Williams	Doug Coby	Eric Goodale	Chevrolet	Report
16	Virginia is for Racing Lovers 200	Matt Hirschman	Corey LaJoie	Corey LaJoie	Chevrolet	Report

=== Point standings ===
(key) Bold – Pole position awarded by time. Italics – Pole position set by final practice results or rainout. * – Most laps led. ** – All laps led.

Pos	Driver	NSM	RCH	RIV	LEE	JEN	MON	RIV	WAL	NHA	CLA	THO	LGY	OSW	RIV	THO	MAR	Points
1	Jon McKennedy	4	8	17	2	6	18	4	8	5	1	4	4	6	10	6	12	597
2	Ron Silk	7	10	3	4	9	3*	**3**	**5**	21	2	12	2	13	3	9	11	591
3	Eric Goodale	2	6	9	9	11	6	11	15	4	12	2	12	9	5	1	7	588
4	Justin Bonsignore	31	**1**	25	10	8	1	2	6	**12**	6	5	5	1	**1***	14	29	568
5	Austin Beers	11	11	13	7	12	8	9	7	11	11	16	3	12	6	11	8	548
6	Kyle Bonsignore	15	20	10	6	19	11	6	10	2	5	7	13	4	21	5	16	536
7	Tommy Catalano	8	2	12	11	5	9	14	12	20	7	15	6	17	12	15	9	534
8	Craig Lutz	6	15	26	14	10	15	15	11	10	13	1*	9	3	7	23	23	508
9	Doug Coby			1*	1		5	10		7	9	3	**1***	7*	4	8*	30	460
10	J. B. Fortin	14	14		8	3	14	25	22	16	16	24	11	22	23	20	10	418
11	Patrick Emerling	9	25	2		13	22		3	3		9		23	2	4	34	380
12	Dave Sapienza	17	16	18	13	15	16	18	18	24	15	23			11	12	20	380
13	Gary McDonald	24	22	22	18	20	21		20	18	18	17	17	21	20	21	25	356
14	Walter Sutcliffe Jr.			21	17	18	19	22	19	17	21	13	16	20	18	19	35	342
15	Melissa Fifield	30	27	30	19	21	25	26	27	23	20	18	18	25	22	24	28	321
16	Ken Heagy	22		19			17	24		15	17	11	10	18	15	13	27	320
17	Matt Hirschman	**1***			3		2		2		4			**3**			**2**	300
18	Tyler Rypkema	5	5			**2***		12		19		14		24		18	22	278
19	Andrew Krause	29	18			4			4*			22		10			6	217
20	Timmy Solomito			5		14		8*	23			8			8			201
21	Jake Johnson			24	**5**		7		26		**3**		8					193
22	Donny Lia		9					21		8*		19		11	25			173
23	Ronnie Williams	12		14			12					20				**16**	19	173
24	Kyle Ebersole	26	4			17				25			7	16				169
25	Anthony Nocella		28							1	19					3	5	168
26	Bobby Santos III		17							13				8		10	4	168
27	Jimmy Blewett	13	7						1			**21**					17	166
28	Mike Christopher Jr.	3				1	13									2		162
29	Kyle Soper			7				1							9	7		156
30	Ryan Preece	10							6		6					17	31	151
31	Eddie McCarthy	20	23						14	14							14	135
32	James Pritchard Jr.		21			16	20	20	13									130
33	Spencer Davis	16	26			22						10					21	125
34	Dylan Slepian	21		3				5							24			122
35	Chuck Hossfeld		3											2			18	110
36	Matt Kimball	19					24		17		10							106
37	John Beatty Jr.			8				7							16			101
38	Sam Rameau				12		4				22							94
39	Max McLaughlin		12			7											26	88
40	Brian Robie						23				8			15				86
41	Corey LaJoie									9							1*	83
42	Eddie Brunnhoelzl III							16							14	22		80
43	Anthony Sesely								21		14			19				78
44	Chris Young	28		11				11										76
45	Chris Turbush			16				23							17			76
46	Ryan Newman		13														3	73
47	Matt Brode			27				13							19			73
48	Roger Turbush			28				19							13			72
49	J. R. Bertuccio	18		23									19					72
50	Jacob Perry				15		10											63
51	Joey Coulter	25		29													15	63
52	Jeremy Gerstner	27	19														24	62
53	Jamie Tomaino												14				13	61
54	Tom Rogers Jr.			20					25									43
55	Todd Patnode						26				23							39
56	John Baker			6														38
57	Blake Barney								9									35
58	Bryan Dauzat		24														32	32
59	Mike Leaty													14				30
60	John Fortin			15														29
61	Gary Putnam												15					29
62	Steve Dickey				16													28
63	Jack Ely								16									28
64	Andy Seuss									22								22
65	Paul Charette	23																21
66	Danny Bohn								24									20
67	Bobby Labonte																33	11

== See also ==
- 2022 NASCAR Cup Series
- 2022 NASCAR Xfinity Series
- 2022 NASCAR Camping World Truck Series
- 2022 ARCA Menards Series
- 2022 ARCA Menards Series East
- 2022 ARCA Menards Series West
- 2022 NASCAR Pinty's Series
- 2022 NASCAR Mexico Series
- 2022 NASCAR Whelen Euro Series
- 2022 SRX Series
- 2022 CARS Tour
- 2022 SMART Modified Tour
