= 2020 NASCAR Whelen Modified Tour =

Auto racing season

The 2020 NASCAR Whelen Modified Tour was the thirty-sixth season of the Whelen Modified Tour (NWMT), a stock car racing tour sanctioned by NASCAR. It began with the Wade Cole Memorial 133 at Jennerstown Speedway on June 21 and concluded at Thompson Speedway Motorsports Park on October 11. Justin Bonsignore won the championship, his second.

== Schedule ==
On November 5, 2019, NASCAR announced the 2020 Whelen Modified Tour schedule. Among the 17 races was an inaugural stop at Iowa Speedway and returns to Jennerstown Speedway Complex and Martinsville Speedway. Due to the COVID-19 pandemic, however, the Martinsville date was cancelled, and many of the early-season races were postponed. An initial version of a revised schedule had Myrtle Beach Speedway hosting the season-opening race on June 6, but that date was eventually moved to Jennerstown and rescheduled for June 21. Two events at White Mountain Motorsports Park and an event at Monadnock Speedway were also added to the revised schedule. Oswego Speedway announced the cancellation of their September race in August in the face of tight state restrictions on gatherings.

Due to the COVID-19 pandemic, the WMT ran on tracks that are not NASCAR-sanctioned such as White Mountain Motorsports Park and Thompson Speedway Motorsports Park.

| No. | Race title | Track | Date |
|---|---|---|---|
| 1 | Wade Cole Memorial 133 | Jennerstown Speedway Complex, Jennerstown, Pennsylvania | June 21 |
| 2 | Independence Day 200 | White Mountain Motorsports Park, North Woodstock, New Hampshire | July 4 |
| 3 | White Mountain Showdown 200 | White Mountain Motorsports Park, North Woodstock, New Hampshire | August 1 |
| 4 | Laurel Highlands 150 | Jennerstown Speedway Complex, Jennerstown, Pennsylvania | August 22 |
| 5 | Advanced Gas Distributors Inc. 200 | Monadnock Speedway, Winchester, New Hampshire | August 30 |
| 6 | Thompson 150 | Thompson Speedway Motorsports Park, Thompson, Connecticut | September 3* |
| 7 | Musket 200 presented by Whelen | New Hampshire Motor Speedway, Loudon, New Hampshire | September 12 |
| 8 | NAPA Auto Parts 150 | Stafford Motor Speedway, Stafford, Connecticut | September 27 |
| 9 | World Series of Speedway Racing 150 | Thompson Speedway Motorsports Park, Thompson, Connecticut | October 11 |

^{*} The Thompson 150 was delayed from September 2 to September 3 due to inclement weather.

== Results and standings ==
=== Race results ===
| No. | Race | Pole position | Most laps led | Winning driver | Manufacturer |
|---|---|---|---|---|---|
| 1 | Wade Cole Memorial 133 | Justin Bonsignore | Justin Bonsignore | Justin Bonsignore | Chevrolet |
| 2 | Independence Day 200 | Matt Hirschman | Matt Hirschman | Justin Bonsignore | Chevrolet |
| 3 | White Mountain Showdown 200 | Jon McKennedy | Jon McKennedy | Doug Coby | Chevrolet |
| 4 | Laurel Highlands 150 | Justin Bonsignore | Justin Bonsignore | Craig Lutz | Chevrolet |
| 5 | Advanced Gas Distributors Inc. 200 | Jon McKennedy | Ron Silk | Justin Bonsignore | Chevrolet |
| 6 | Thompson 150 | Doug Coby | Doug Coby | Ron Silk | Chevrolet |
| 7 | Musket 200 presented by Whelen | Andy Seuss | Justin Bonsignore | Bobby Santos III | Chevrolet |
| 8 | NAPA Auto Parts 150 | Eric Goodale | Ron Silk | Ron Silk | Chevrolet |
| 9 | World Series of Speedway Racing 150 | Doug Coby | Jon McKennedy | Craig Lutz | Chevrolet |

=== Point standings ===
(key) Bold – Pole position awarded by time. Italics – Pole position set by final practice results or rainout. * – Most laps led. ** – All laps led.

| Pos | Driver | JEN | WMM | WMM | JEN | MND | TMP | NHA | STA | TMP | Points |
|---|---|---|---|---|---|---|---|---|---|---|---|
| 1 | Justin Bonsignore | **1**** | 1 | 5 | **5** | 1 | 2 | 2* | 3 | 4 | 392 |
| 2 | Jon McKennedy | 3 | 9 | **4*** | 6 | **9** | 3 | 8 | 6 | 2* | 352 |
| 3 | Doug Coby | 7 | 3 | 1 | 4 | 3 | **5*** | 9 | 2 | **22** | 347 |
| 4 | Craig Lutz | 2 | 8 | 11 | 1 | 10 | 12 | 5 | 13 | 1 | 342 |
| 5 | Ron Silk | 6 | 27 | 10 | Wth | 2* | 1 | 3 | 1* | 3 | 311 |
| 6 | Matt Swanson | 9 | 28 | 3 | 7 | 13 | 9 | 7 | 9 | 11 | 301 |
| 7 | Dave Sapienza | 13 | 6 | 7 | 2 | 11 | 6 | 20 | 21 | 19 | 292 |
| 8 | Calvin Carroll | 5 | 13 | 6 | 18 | 14 | 11 | 17 | 15 | 8 | 290 |
| 9 | Tyler Rypkema **(R)** | 18 | 22 | 13 | 8 | 12 | 10 | 10 | 10 | 10 | 283 |
| 10 | Anthony Nocella | | 14 | 8 | 3 | 4 | 8 | 4 | 17 | 12 | 282 |
| 11 | Chris Pasteryak | 12 | 7 | 20 | 10 | 20 | 4 | 13 | 16 | 13 | 282 |
| 12 | Sam Rameau | 11 | 12 | 21 | 11 | 8 | 23 | 12 | 12 | 6 | 281 |
| 13 | Woody Pitkat | 16 | 5 | 23 | 16 | 7 | 21 | 29 | 19 | 7 | 254 |
| 14 | Kyle Bonsignore | 8 | 11 | 2 | 15 | 19 | 20 | Wth | 26 | 5 | 246 |
| 15 | Eric Goodale | 14 | 16 | 9 | 13 | 18 | 14 | 19 | **22** | 27 | 244 |
| 16 | Patrick Emerling | 19 | 15 | 12 | 12 | 17 | 26 | 11 | | 9 | 229 |
| 17 | Rob Summers | 10 | 26 | 14 | 17 | 22 | 15 | 26 | 24 | 14 | 228 |
| 18 | J. B. Fortin | 23 | 17 | 12 | 19 | 24 | 13 | 16 | 25 | | 203 |
| 19 | Walter Sutcliffe Jr. | 31 | 25 | 25 | 20 | 25 | 16 | 23 | 18 | 15 | 198 |
| 20 | Ronnie Williams | 28 | | | | 5 | 7 | 28 | 7 | 17 | 172 |
| 21 | Tommy Catalano | 32 | 4 | 24 | 23 | 16 | | 24 | | 23 | 162 |
| 22 | Melissa Fifield | 27 | 31 | 27 | 25 | 28 | 25 | 30 | 27 | 20 | 156 |
| 23 | Timmy Solomito | 15 | 29 | 17 | Wth | | 22 | | 11 | 26 | 144 |
| 24 | Chuck Hossfeld | | | | | 15 | 17 | 18 | 8 | 25 | 138 |
| 25 | Timmy Catalano | 30 | 19 | 16 | 14 | 26 | | 22 | | | 137 |
| 26 | Matt Hirschman | 4 | **2*** | | | 6 | | | | | 122 |
| 27 | Chase Dowling | 26 | 10 | | | | | 15 | 5 | | 122 |
| 28 | Gary Byington **(R)** | | 30 | 28 | | 23 | 27 | Wth | 20 | 18 | 118 |
| 29 | Amy Catalano **(R)** | 29 | 23 | 18 | 22 | 27 | | 27 | | | 118 |
| 30 | Jeff Gallup **(R)** | 17 | 18 | 19 | | 21 | Wth | | | | 101 |
| 31 | Jeremy Gerstner | 21 | 20 | 22 | Wth | Wth | | | | | 69 |
| 32 | J. R. Bertuccio | 20 | 21 | 26 | Wth | | | | | | 65 |
| 33 | Gary Putnam | | | | 21 | | | 14 | | | 53 |
| 34 | Andrew Krause | 33 | 24 | | 24 | | Wth | Wth | | | 51 |
| 35 | Bobby Santos III | | | | | | | 1 | | | 47 |
| 36 | John Beatty Jr. | 24 | | | | | 18 | | | Wth | 46 |
| 37 | Joey Mucciacciaro **(R)** | | | | | | | | 14 | | 45 |
| 38 | Max McLaughlin **(R)** | | | | | | | | 4 | | 40 |
| 39 | Andy Jankowiak | | | | Wth | | 24 | | | 24 | 40 |
| 40 | Andy Seuss | | | | | | | **6** | | | 39 |
| 41 | Kyle Ebersole | | | | 9 | | | | | | 35 |
| 42 | Ken Heagy | | | Wth | | | | | | 16 | 28 |
| 43 | Ryan Preece | | | | | | 19 | | | | 26 |
| 44 | Bryan Dauzat | | | | | | | 21 | | | 23 |
| 45 | Cory Osland **(R)** | | | | | | | | | 21 | 23 |
| 46 | Eddie McCarthy **(R)** | 22 | | | | | | | | | 22 |
| 47 | Matt Galko **(R)** | | | | | | | | 23 | | 21 |
| 48 | Roger Turbush **(R)** | 25 | | | | | | | | | 19 |
| 49 | Joey Cipriano III **(R)** | | | | | | | 25 | | | 19 |
| 50 | Manny Dias **(R)** | | | | | | 28 | | | | 16 |
| | Jamie Tomaino | | | | | | | | | Wth | 0 |
| Pos | Driver | JEN | WMM | WMM | JEN | MND | TMP | NHA | STA | TMP | Points |

== See also ==
- 2020 NASCAR Cup Series
- 2020 NASCAR Xfinity Series
- 2020 NASCAR Gander RV & Outdoors Truck Series
- 2020 ARCA Menards Series
- 2020 ARCA Menards Series East
- 2020 ARCA Menards Series West
- 2020 NASCAR Pinty's Series
- 2020 NASCAR Whelen Euro Series
- 2020 CARS Tour
- 2020 eNASCAR iRacing Pro Invitational Series
- 2020 EuroNASCAR Esports Series
