= 2022 Jersey Shore 150 =

Race details
- Race 8 of 16 in the 2022 NASCAR Whelen Modified Tour season
- Date: July 9, 2022
- Location: Wall Stadium in Wall Township, New Jersey
- Course: Permanent racing facility
- Course length: 0.536 km (1/3 miles)
- Distance: 150 laps, 50.0 mi (80.467 km)

Pole position
Driver	Ron Silk	Tyler Haydt
- Time: 12.353

Most laps led
Driver	Andrew Krause	Diane Krause
- Laps: 70

Winner
No. 7	Jimmy Blewett	Tommy Baldwin

Television in the United States
- Network: FloSports

The 2022 Jersey Shore 150 was a NASCAR Whelen Modified Tour race that was held on July 9, 2022. It was contested over 150 laps on the 1/3-mile (0.54 km) oval. It was the 8th race of the 2022 NASCAR Whelen Modified Tour season. Jimmy Blewett, driving for owner Tommy Baldwin, got his first win of the season.

== Report ==
=== Entry list ===
- (R) denotes rookie driver.
- (i) denotes driver who is ineligible for series driver points.

No.	Driver	Owner
01	Melissa Fifield	Kenneth Fifield
03	Tom Rogers Jr.	Ken Darch
3	Jake Johnson (R)	Jan Boehler
07	Patrick Emerling	Jennifer Emerling
7	Jimmy Blewett	Tommy Baldwin
14	Blake Barney	Richard Barney
16	Ron Silk	Tyler Haydt
18	Ken Heagy	Robert Pollifrone
19	Anthony Sesely	Tommy Wanick
20	Edward McCarthy (R)	Edward McCarthy Jr.
22	Kyle Bonsignore	Kyle Bonsignore
24	Andrew Krause	Diane Krause
26	Gary McDonald	Sean McDonald
34	J. B. Fortin	Nicole Fortin
36	David Sapienza	Judy Thilberg
51	Justin Bonsignore	Kenneth Massa
54	Tommy Catalano	David Catalano
58	Eric Goodale	Edgar Goodale
60	Matt Hirschman	Roy Hall
64	Austin Beers (R)	Mike Murphy
65	Danny Bohn	Scott Branick
66	Timmy Solomito	Jerry Solomito
71	James Pritchard Jr. (R)	James Pritchard
76	Matthew Kimball (R)	Jerel Gomarlo
78	Walter Sutcliffe Jr.	Steven Sutcliffe
79	Jon McKennedy	Tim Lepine
81	Jack Ely (R)	Jack Ely
82	Craig Lutz	Danny Watts Jr.
92	Anthony Nocella	Anthony Nocella
Official entry list

== Practice ==
Pos	No.	Driver	Team	Time	Speed
1	24	Andrew Krause	Diane Krause	12.443	95.475
2	60	Matt Hirschman	Roy Hall	12.478	95.208
3	51	Justin Bonsignore	Kenneth Massa	12.480	95.192
[ Official first practice results]

== Qualifying ==
=== Qualifying results ===
Pos	No	Driver	Team	Time	Speed
1	16	Ron Silk	Tyler Haydt	12.353	96.171
2	7	Jimmy Blewett	Tommy Baldwin	12.391	95.876
3	07	Patrick Emerling	Jennifer Emerling	12.455	95.383
4	51	Justin Bonsignore	Kenneth Massa	12.473	95.246
5	24	Andrew Krause	Diane Krause	12.481	95.185
6	64	Austin Beers	Mike Murphy	12.499	95.048
7	20	Eddie McCarthy	Ed McCarthy	12.506	94.994
8	14	Blake Barney	Richard Barney	12.514	94.934
9	36	Dave Sapienza	Judy Thilburg	12.517	94.911
10	60	Matt Hirschman	Roy Hall	12.523	94.865
11	22	Kyle Bonsignore	Kyle Bonsignore	12.544	94.707
12	65	Danny Bohn	Scott Brannick	12.549	94.669
13	19	Anthony Sesley	Tommy Wanick	12.590	94.361
14	81	Jack Ely	Jeff Ely	12.592	94.346
15	79	Jon McKennedy	Tim Lepine	12.593	94.338
16	82	Craig Lutz	Danny Watts Jr.	12.607	94.233
17	54	Tommy Catalano	David Catalano	12.623	94.114
18	58	Eric Goodale	Edgar Goodale	12.626	94.092
19	66	Timmy Solomito	Jerry Solomito	12.636	94.017
20	34	J.B. Fortin	Nicole Fortin	12.654	93.883
21	03	Tom Rogers, Jr.	Kenny Darch	12.684	93.661
22	3	Jake Johnson	Jan Boehler	12.750	93.176
23	71	James Pritchard, Jr	James Pritchard	12.819	92.675
24	76	Matt Kimball	Jerel Gomarlo	13.004	91.357
25	26	Gary McDonald	Sean McDonald	13.593	87.398
26	01	Melissa Fifield	Kenneth Fifield	13.761	86.331
27	78	Walter Sutcliffe, Jr.	Steven Sutcliffe	13.874	85.628
[ Official qualifying results]

== Race ==
Laps: 150

Pos	Grid	No	Driver	Team	Laps	Points	Status
1	2	7	Jimmy Blewett	Tommy Baldwin	150	47	Running
2	10	60	Matt Hirschman	Roy Hall	150	42	Running
3	3	07	Patrick Emerling	Jennifer Emerling	150	41	Running
4	5	24	Andrew Krause	Diane Krause	150	42	Running
5	1	16	Ron Silk	Tyler Haydt	150	40	Running
6	4	51	Justin Bonsignore	Kenneth Massa	150	38	Running
7	6	64	Austin Beers	Mike Murphy	150	37	Running
8	15	79	Jon McKennedy	Tim Lepine	150	36	Running
9	8	14	Blake Barney	Richard Barney	150	35	Running
10	11	22	Kyle Bonsignore	Kyle Bonsignore	150	34	Running
11	16	82	Craig Lutz	Danny Watts Jr.	150	33	Running
12	17	54	Tommy Catalano	David Catalano	150	32	Running
13	23	71	James Pritchard Jr.	James Pritchard	150	31	Running
14	7	20	Edward McCarthy	Edward McCarthy Jr.	150	30	Running
15	18	58	Eric Goodale	Edgar Goodale	149	29	Running
16	14	81	Jack Ely	Jack Ely	147	28	Running
17	24	76	Matthew Kimball	Jerel Gomarlo	147	27	Running
18	9	36	David Sapienza	Judy Thilberg	145	26	Running
19	27	78	Walter Sutcliffe Jr.	Steven Sutcliffe	144	25	Running
20	25	26	Gary McDonald	Sean McDonald	143	24	Running
21	13	19	Anthony Sesely	Tommy Wanick	97	23	Mechanical
22	20	34	J. B. Fortin	Nicole Fortin	96	22	Running
23	19	66	Timmy Solomito	Jerry Solomito	80	21	Mechanical
24	12	65	Danny Bohn	Scott Branick	76	20	Crash
25	21	03	Tom Rogers Jr.	Ken Darch	66	19	Engine
26	22	3	Jake Johnson	Jan Boehler	49	18	Overheating
27	26	01	Melissa Fifield	Kenneth Fifield	48	17	Handling
[ Official race results]

=== Race statistics ===
- Lead changes: 4
- Cautions/Laps: 4 for 26 laps
- Time of race: 0:43:12
- Average speed: 68.75 mph

Previous race: 2022 Buzz Chew Chevrolet Cadillac 200	NASCAR Whelen Modified Tour; 2022 season	Next race: 2022 Whelen 100
