= 2022 Buzz Chew Chevrolet Cadillac 200 =

Race details
- Race 7 of 16 in the 2022 NASCAR Whelen Modified Tour season
- Date: June 25, 2022
- Location: Riverhead Raceway in Riverhead, New York
- Course: Permanent racing facility
- Course length: 0.322 km (0.20 miles)
- Distance: 200 laps, 50 mi (80.467 km)
- Average speed: 54.945

Pole position
Driver	Ron Silk	Tyler Haydt
- Time: 11.586

Most laps led
Driver	Timmy Solomito	Jerry Solomito
- Laps: 114

Winner
No. 15	Kyle Soper	Wayne Anderson

Television in the United States
- Network: FloSports

The 2022 Buzz Chew Chevrolet Cadillac 200 was a NASCAR Whelen Modified Tour race that was held on June 25, 2022 at the Riverhead Raceway. It was contested over 200 laps on the 0.25-mile (0.40 km) oval. It was the 7th race of the 2022 NASCAR Whelen Modified Tour season. Kyle Soper collected his first Modified Tour victory with a late-race pass for the lead on Justin Bonsignore.

== Report ==
=== Entry list ===
- (R) denotes rookie driver.
- (i) denotes driver who is ineligible for series driver points.

No.	Driver	Owner
01	Melissa Fifield	Kenneth Fifield
3	Donny Lia	Jan Boehler
5	John Beatty Jr.	Mark Mina
7	Doug Coby	Tommy Baldwin Jr
10	Dylan Slepian	Rob Pelis
15	Kyle Soper	Wayne Anderson
16	Ron Silk	Tyler Haydt
18	Ken Heagy	Robert Pollifrone
22	Kyle Bonsignore	Kyle Bonsignore
26	Eddie Brunnhoelzl	Sean McDonald
32	Tyler Rypkema	Dean Rypkema
34	J. B. Fortin	Nicole Fortin
36	David Sapienza	Judy Thilberg
49	Chris Young	Chris Young
51	Justin Bonsignore	Kenneth Massa
54	Tommy Catalano	David Catalano
58	Eric Goodale	Edgar Goodale
64	Austin Beers	Mike Murphy
66	Timmy Solomito	Jerry Solomito
71	James Pritchard Jr.	James Pritchard
78	Walter Sutcliffe Jr.	Steven Sutcliffe
79	Jon McKennedy	Tim Lepine
81	Craig Turbush	Danny Watts Jr.
82	Craig Lutz	Danny Watts Jr.
88	Roger Turbush	Patrick Kennedy
96	Matthew Brode	Howie Brode
Official entry list

== Practice ==
Pos	No.	Driver	Team	Time	Speed
1	10	Dylan Slepian	Rob Pelis	11.455	78.568
2	16	Ron Silk	Tyler Haydt	11.548	77.936
3	15	Kyle Soper	Wayne Anderson	11.558	77.868
Official first practice results

== Qualifying ==
=== Starting lineup ===
Pos	No	Driver	Team	Time	Speed
1	16	Ron Silk	Tyler Haydt	11.586	77.680
2	66	Timmy Solomito	Jerry Solomito	11.637	77.340
3	82	Craig Lutz	Danny Watts Jr.	11.644	77.293
4	54	Tommy Catalano	David Catalano	11.683	77.035
5	15	Kyle Soper	Wayne Anderson	11.685	77.022
6	51	Justin Bonsignore	Kenneth Massa	11.690	76.989
7	58	Eric Goodale	Edgar Goodale	11.696	76.949
8	10	Dylan Slepian	Rob Pelis	11.700	76.923
9	79	Jon McKennedy	Tim Lepine	11.701	76.917
10	7	Doug Coby	Tommy Baldwin Jr.	11.717	76.811
11	5	John Beatty Jr.	Mark Mina	11.753	76.576
12	96	Matthew Brode	Howie Brode	11.801	76.265
13	81	Chris Turbush	Patrick Kennedy	11.821	76.136
14	34	J. B. Fortin	Nicole Fortin	11.823	76.123
15	3	Donny Lia	Jan Boehler	11.827	76.097
16	22	Kyle Bonsignore	Kyle Bonsignore	11.859	75.892
17	36	Dave Sapienza	Judy Thillberg	11.878	75.770
18	49	Chris Young	Chris Young	11.914	75.541
19	26	Eddie Brunnhoelzl	Sean McDonald	11.964	75.226
20	64	Austin Beers	Mike Murphy	11.966	75.213
21	32	Tyler Rypkema	Dean Rypkema	11.975	75.157
22	88	Roger Turbush	Patrick Kennedy	12.002	74.988
23	18	Ken Heagy	Robert Pollifrone	12.066	74.590
24	78	James Pritchard Jr.	James Pritchard	12.089	74.448
25	78	Walter Sutcliffe Jr.	Steven Sutcliffe	12.685	70.950
26	01	Melissa Fifield	Kenneth Fifield	13.247	67.940
Official qualifying results

== Race ==
Laps: 200

Pos	Grid	No	Driver	Team	Laps	Points	Status
1	5	15	Kyle Soper	Wayne Anderson	200	47	running
2	6	51	Justin Bonsignore	Kenneth Massa	200	43	running
3	1	16	Ron Silk	Tyler Haydt	200	41	running
4	9	79	Jon McKennedy	Tim Lepine	200	40	running
5	8	10	Dylan Slepian	Rob Pelis	200	39	running
6	16	22	Kyle Bonsignore	Kyle Bonsignore	200	38	running
7	11	5	John Beatty Jr.	Mark Mina	200	37	running
8	2	66	Timmy Solomito	Jerry Solomito	200	38	running
9	20	64	Austin Beers	Mike Murphy	200	35	running
10	10	7	Doug Coby	Tommy Baldwin Jr.	200	34	running
11	7	58	Eric Goodale	Edgar Goodale	199	33	running
12	21	32	Tyler Rypkema	Dean Rypkema	199	32	running
13	12	96	Matthew Brode	Howie Brode	199	31	running
14	4	54	Tommy Catalano	David Catalano	199	30	running
15	3	82	Craig Lutz	Danny Watts Jr.	198	29	running
16	19	26	Eddie Brunnhoezl	Sean McDonald	198	28	running
17	18	49	Chris Young	Chris Young	197	27	running
18	17	36	Dave Sapienza	Judt Thillberg	197	26	running
19	22	88	Roger Turbush	Patrick Kennedy	196	25	running
20	24	71	James Pritchard Jr.	James Pritchard	194	24	running
21	15	3	Donny Lia	Jan Boehler	165	23	running
22	26	78	Walter Sutcliffe Jr.	Steven Sutcliffe	59	22	crash
23	13	81	Chris Turbush	Patrick Kennedy	57	21	electrical
24	23	18	Ken Heagy	Robert Pollifrone	57	20	crash
25	14	34	J. B. Fortin	Nicole Fortin	25	19	crash
26	25	91	Melissa Fifield	Kenneth Fifield	9	18	suspension
Official race results

=== Race statistics ===
- Lead changes: 4
- Cautions/Laps: 4 for 35 laps
- Time of race: 0:54:36
- Average speed: 54.945

Previous race: 2022 Duel at the Dog 200	NASCAR Whelen Modified Tour; 2022 season	Next race: 2022 Jersey Shore 150
