= 2022 Duel at the Dog 200 =

Race details
- Race 6 of 16 in the 2022 NASCAR Whelen Modified Tour season
- Date: June 19, 2022
- Location: Monadnock Speedway in Winchester, New Hampshire
- Course: Permanent racing facility
- Course length: 0.40 km (0.25 miles)
- Distance: 150 laps, 37.5 mi (60.35 km)
- Average speed: 55.641

Pole position
Driver	Justin Bonsignore	Kenneth Massa
- Time: n/a

Most laps led
Driver	Ron Silk	Tyler Haydt
- Laps: 110

Winner
No. 51	Justin Bonsignore	Kenneth Massa

Television in the United States
- Network: FloSports

The 2022 Duel at the Dog 200 was a NASCAR Whelen Modified Tour race that was held on June 19, 2022. The race was originally scheduled to be run on June 18, but was postponed due to rain. It was contested over 150 laps on the 0.25-mile (0.40 km) oval. It was the 6th race of the 2022 NASCAR Whelen Modified Tour season. Justin Bonsignore collected his second victory of the season with a late-race pass for the lead.

== Report ==
=== Entry list ===
- (R) denotes rookie driver.
- (i) denotes driver who is ineligible for series driver points.

No.	Driver	Owner
01	Melissa Fifield	Kenneth Fifield
1	Mike Christopher Jr.	Beth Baldwin
3	Jake Johnson	Jan Boehler
06	Sam Rameau	Sam Rameau
07	Patrick Emerling	Jennifer Emerling
7	Doug Coby	Tommy Baldwin
12	Todd Patnode	Cory Plummer
16	Ron Silk	Tyler Haydt
18	Ken Heagy	Robert Pollifrone
22	Kyle Bonsignore	Kyle Bonsignore
25	Brian Robie	Michael Smith
26	Gary McDonald	Sean McDonald
34	J. B. Fortin	Nicole Fortin
36	David Sapienza	Judy Thilberg
47	Jacob Perry	Jack Bateman
50	Ronnie Williams	Paul Les
51	Justin Bonsignore	Kenneth Massa
54	Tommy Catalano	David Catalano
58	Eric Goodale	Edgar Goodale
60	Matt Hirschman	Roy Hall
64	Austin Beers	Mike Murphy
71	James Pritchard Jr.	James Pritchard
76	Matthew Kimball	Jerel Gomarlo
78	Walter Sutcliffe Jr.	Steven Sutcliffe
79	Jon McKennedy	Tim Lepine
82	Craig Lutz	Danny Watts Jr.
Official entry list

== Practice ==
Pos	No.	Driver	Team	Time	Speed
1	51	Justin Bonsignore	Kenneth Massa	12.854	70.017
2	76	Matthew Kimball	Jerel Gomarlo	12.898	69.778
3	60	Matt Hirschman	Roy Hall	12.909	69.719
Official first practice results

== Qualifying ==
=== Starting lineup ===
Pos	No	Driver	Team
1	51	Justin Bonsignore	Kenneth Massa
2	76	Matthew Kimball	Jerel Gomarlo
3	60	Matt Hirschman	Roy Hall
4	16	Ron Silk	Tyler Haydt
5	06	Sam Rameau	Sam Rameau
6	7	Doug Coby	Tommy Baldwin
7	36	Dave Sapienza	Judy Thillberg
8	58	Eric Goodale	Edgar Goodale
9	50	Ronnie Williams	Paul Les
10	3	Jake Johnson	Jan Boehler
11	82	Craig Lutz	Danny Watts Jr.
12	34	J. B. Fortin	Nicole Fortin
13	22	Kyle Bonsignore	Kyle Bonsignore
14	07	Patrick Emerling	Jennifer Emerling
15	64	Austin Beers	Mike Murphy
16	47	Jacob Perry	Jack Bateman
17	79	Jon McKennedy	Tim Lepine
18	1	Jimmy Blewett	Beth Baldwin
19	25	Brian Roble	Michael Smith
20	18	Ken Heagy	Robert Pollifrone
21	54	Tommy Catalano	David Catalano
22	71	James Pritchard Jr.	James Pritchard
23	12	Todd Patnode	Cory Plummer
24	78	Walter Sutcliffe Jr.	Steven Sutcliffe
25	26	Gary McDonald	Sean McDonald
26	01	Melissa Fifield	Kenneth Fifield
Official qualifying results

== Race ==
Laps: 200

Pos	Grid	No	Driver	Team	Laps	Points	Status
1	1	51	Justin Bonsignore	Kenneth Massa	200	47	running
2	3	60	Matt Hirschman	Roy Hall	200	43	running
3	4	16	Ron Silk	Tyler Haydt	200	43	running
4	5	06	Sam Rameau	Sam Rameau	200	40	running
5	6	7	Doug Coby	Tommy Baldwin Jr.	200	39	running
6	8	58	Eric Goodale	Edgar Goodale	200	38	running
7	10	3	Jake Johnson	Jan Boehler	200	37	running
8	15	64	Austin Beers	Mike Murphy	200	36	running
9	21	54	Tommy Catalano	David Catalano	200	35	running
10	16	47	Jacob Perry	Jack Bateman	200	34	running
11	13	22	Kyle Bonsignore	Kyle Bonsignore	200	33	running
12	9	50	Ronnie Williams	Paul Les	200	32	running
13	18	1	Mike Christopher Jr.	Tommy Baldwin	200	31	running
14	12	34	J. B. Fortin	Nicole Fortin	199	30	running
15	11	82	Craig Lutz	Danny Watts Jr.	199	29	running
16	7	36	Dave Sapienza	Judy Thillberg	198	25	running
17	20	18	Ken Heagy	Robert Pollifrone	195	24	running
18	17	79	Jon McKennedy	Tim Lepine	193	23	running
19	23	78	Walter Sutcliffe Jr.	Steven Sutcliffe	192	25	running
20	22	71	James Pritchard Jr.	James Pritchard	192	24	running
21	24	26	Gary McDonald	Sean McDonald	192	23	running
22	14	07	Patrick Emerling	Jennifer Emerling	164	22	handling
23	19	25	Brian Robie	Michael Smith	149	21	running
24	2	76	Matthew Kimball	Jerel Gomarlo	37	20	power steering
25	25	01	Melissa Fifield	Kenneth Fifield	13	19	handling
Official race results

=== Race statistics ===
- Lead changes: 4
- Cautions/Laps: 4 for 22 laps
- Time of race: 0:53:55
- Average speed: 55.641

Previous race: 2022 Jennerstown Salutes 150	NASCAR Whelen Modified Tour; 2022 season	Next race: 2022 Buzz Chew Chevrolet Cadillac 200
