= 2022 Jennerstown Salutes 150 =

Race details
- Race 5 of 16 in the 2022 NASCAR Whelen Modified Tour season
- Date: May 28, 2022
- Location: Jennerstown Speedway in Jennerstown, Pennsylvania
- Course: Permanent racing facility
- Course length: 0.522 miles (0.840 km)
- Distance: 150 laps, 78.3 mi (120.012 km)

Pole position
Driver	Tyler Rypkema	Dean Rypkema
- Time: 18.043

Winner
No. 7	Mike Christopher Jr.	Tommy Baldwin Racing

Television in the United States
- Network: FloSports

The 2022 Jennerstown Salutes 150 was a NASCAR Whelen Modified Tour race that was held on May 28, 2022. It was contested over 150 laps on the 0.522-mile (0.840 km) oval. It was the 5th race of the 2022 NASCAR Whelen Modified Tour season. Tommy Baldwin Racing driver Mike Christopher Jr. collected his first career Modified Tour victory in only his 3rd career start.

== Report ==
=== Entry list ===
- (R) denotes rookie driver.
- (i) denotes driver who is ineligible for series driver points.

No.	Driver	Owner
01	Melissa Fifield	Kenneth Fifield
3	Timmy Solomito	Jan Boehler
5	Kyle Ebersole	Bob Ebersole
07	Patrick Emerling	Jennifer Emerling
7	Mike Christopher Jr.	Tommy Baldwin
16	Ron Silk	Ron Silk
18	Ken Heagy	Robert Pollifrone
22	Kyle Bonsignore	Kyle Bonsignore
24	Andrew Krause	Diane Krause
26	Gary McDonald	Sean McDonald
29	Spencer Davis	Spencer Davis
32	Tyler Rypkema	Dean Rypkema
34	J. B. Fortin	Nicole Fortin
36	David Sapienza	Judy Thilberg
51	Justin Bonsignore	Kenneth Massa
54	Tommy Catalano	David Catalano
58	Eric Goodale	Edgar Goodale
64	Austin Beers	Mike Murphy
71	James Pritchard Jr.	James Pritchard
77	Max McLaughlin	Mike Curb
78	Walter Sutcliffe Jr.	Steven Sutcliffe
79	Jon McKennedy	Tim Lepine
82	Craig Lutz	Danny Watts Jr.
Official entry list

== Practice ==
Pos	No.	Driver	Owner	Time	Speed
1	07	Patrick Emerling	Jennifer Emerling	17.919	104.872
2	32	Tyler Rypkema	Dean Rypkema	17.986	104.481
3	22	Kyle Bonsignore	Kyle Bonsignore	18.02	104.284
Official first practice results

== Qualifying ==
=== Qualifying results ===
Pos	No	Driver	Owner	Time
1	32	Tyler Rypkema	Dean Rypkema	18.043
2	07	Patrick Emerling	Jennifer Emerling	18.071
3	16	Ron Silk	Ron Silk	18.077
4	79	Jon McKennedy	Tim Lepine	18.089
5	22	Kyle Bonsignore	Kyle Bonsignore	18.095
6	34	J. B. Fortin	Nicole Fortin	18.105
7	58	Eric Goodale	Edgar Goodale	18.123
8	7	Mike Christopher Jr.	Tommy Baldwin	18.128
9	3	Timmy Solomito	Jan Boehler	18.145
10	82	Craig Lutz	Danny Watts Jr.	18.155
11	77	Max McLaughlin	Mike Curb	18.177
12	24	Andrew Krause	Diane Krause	18.19
13	36	Dave Sapienza	Judy Thillberg	18.192
14	51	Justin Bonsignore	Kenneth Massa	18.208
15	64	Austin Beers	Mike Murphy	18.252
16	54	Tommy Catalano	David Catalano	18.258
17	29	Spencer Davis	Spencer Davis	18.259
18	5	Kyle Ebersole	Bob Ebersole	18.379
19	71	James Pritchard Jr.	James Pritchard	18.642
20	26	Gary McDonald	Sean McDonald	18.842
21	78	Walter Sutcliffe Jr.	Steven Sutcliffe	19.099
22	01	Melissa Fifield	Kenneth Fifield	19.353
Official qualifying results

== Race ==
Laps: 150

Pos	Grid	No	Driver	Team	Laps	Status
1	8	7	Mike Christopher Jr.	Tommy Baldwin	150	Running
2	1	32	Tyler Rypkema	Dean Rypkema	150	Running
3	6	34	J. B. Fortin	Nicole Fortin	150	Running
4	12	24	Andrew Krause	Diane Krause	150	Running
5	16	54	Tommy Catalano	David Catalano	150	Running
6	4	79	Jon McKennedy	Tim Lepine	150	Running
7	11	77	Max McLaughlin	Mike Curb	149	Running
8	14	51	Justin Bonsignore	Kenneth Massa	149	Running
9	3	16	Ron Silk	Ron Silk	149	Running
10	10	82	Craig Lutz	Danny Watts Jr.	149	Running
11	7	58	Eric Goodale	Edgar Goodale	149	Running
12	15	64	Austin Beers	Mike Murphy	148	Running
13	2	07	Patrick Emerling	Jennifer Emerling	148	Running
14	9	3	Timmy Solomito	Jan Boehler	148	Running
15	13	36	Dave Sapienza	Judy Thillberg	148	Running
16	19	71	James Pritchard Jr.	James Pritchard	147	Running
17	18	5	Kyle Ebersole	Bob Ebersole	147	Running
18	21	78	Walter Sutcliffe Jr.	Steven Sutcliffe	142	Running
19	5	22	Kyle Bonsignore	Kyle Bonsignore	141	Running
20	20	26	Gary McDonald	Sean McDonald	136	Running
21	22	01	Melissa Fifield	Kenneth Fifield	133	Running
22	17	29	Spencer Davis	Spencer Davis	83	Running
Official race results

Previous race: 2022 Granite State Derby	NASCAR Whelen Modified Tour; 2022 season	Next race: 2022 Duel at the Dog 200
