= 2022 Miller Lite 200 =

Race details
- Race 3 of 16 in the 2022 NASCAR Whelen Modified Tour season
- Date: May 14, 2022
- Location: Riverhead Raceway in Riverhead, New York
- Course: Permanent racing facility
- Course length: 0.40 km (0.25 miles)
- Distance: 200 laps, 50.00 mi (80.47 km)
- Average speed: 57.02

Pole position
Driver	Timmy Solomito	Jerry Solomito
- Time: 11.427

Most laps led
Driver	Doug Coby	Tommy Baldwin Racing
- Laps: 196

Winner
No. 7	Doug Coby	Tommy Baldwin Racing

Television in the United States
- Network: FloSports

The 2022 Miller Lite 200 was a NASCAR Whelen Modified Tour race that was held on May 14, 2022. It was contested over 200 laps on the 0.25-mile (0.40 km) oval. It was the 3rd race of the 2022 NASCAR Whelen Modified Tour season. Tommy Baldwin Racing driver Doug Coby collected the victory in his first start of the season.

== Report ==
=== Entry list ===
- (R) denotes rookie driver.
- (i) denotes driver who is ineligible for series driver points.

No.	Driver	Owner
01	Melissa Fifield	Kenneth Fifield
02	Joey Coulter	Joey Coulter
2	J. R. Bertuccio	Joseph Bertuccio
03	Tom Rogers Jr.	Ken Darch
3	Jake Johnson	Jan Boehler
05	John Beatty Jr.	Mark Mina
07	Patrick Emerling	Jennifer Emerling
7	Doug Coby	Tommy Baldwin
10	Dylan Slepian	Rob Pelis
15	Kyle Soper	Wayne Anderson
16	Ron Silk	Ron Silk
18	Ken Heagy	Robert Pollifrone
22	Kyle Bonsignore	Kyle Bonsignore
26	Gary McDonald	Sean McDonald
34	J. B. Fortin	Nicole Fortin
36	David Sapienza	Judy Thilberg
49	Chris Young	Chris Young
50	Ronnie Williams	Paul Les
51	Justin Bonsignore	Kenneth Massa
54	Tommy Catalano	David Catalano
58	Eric Goodale	Edgar Goodale
64	Austin Beers	Mike Murphy
66	Timmy Solomito	Jerry Solomito
71	James Pritchard Jr.	James Pritchard
78	Walter Sutcliffe Jr.	Steven Sutcliffe
79	Jon McKennedy	Tim Lepine
81	Chris Turbush	Patrick Kennedy
82	Craig Lutz	Danny Watts Jr.
87	John Baker	Daryl Baker
96	Matthew Brode	Howie Brode
98	Dave Brigati	Bryan Schwarz
Official entry list

== Qualifying ==
=== Qualifying results ===
Pos	No	Driver	Team	Time
1	66	Timmy Solomito	Jerry Solomito	11.427
2	58	Eric Goodale	Edgar Goodale	11.453
3	7	Doug Coby	Tommy Baldwin	11.490
4	82	Craig Lutz	Danny Watts Jr.	11.522
5	51	Justin Bonsignore	Kenneth Massa	11.553
6	22	Kyle Bonsignore	Kyle Bonsignore	11.572
7	16	Ron Silk	Ron Silk	11.596
8	96	Matt Brode	Howie Brode	11.621
9	18	Ken Heagy	Robert Pollifrone	11.624
10	50	Ronnie Williams	Paul Les	11.631
11	34	J. B. Fortin	Nicole Fortin	11.632
12	10	Dylan Slepian	Rob Pelis	11.639
13	64	Austin Beers	Mike Murphy	11.641
14	02	Joey Coulter	Joey Coulter	11.646
15	07	Patrick Emerling	Jennifer Emerling	11.650
16	5	John Beatty Jr.	Mark Mina	11.694
17	49	Chris Young	Chris Young	11.699
18	54	Tommy Catalano	David Catalano	11.716
19	2	J. R. Bertuccio	Joseph Bertuccio	11.737
20	87	John Baker	Daryl Baker	11.795
21	36	Dave Sapienza	Judy Thillberg	11.820
22	81	Chris Turbush	Patrick Kennedy	11.856
23	88	Roger Turbush	Patrick Kennedy	11.876
24	03	Tom Rogers Jr.	Ken Darch	11.954
25	78	Walter Sutcliffe Jr.	Steven Sutcliffe	12.178
26	01	Melissa Fifield	Kenneth Fifield	13.057
27	79	Jon McKennedy	Tim Lepine	11.961
28	15	Kyle Soper	Wayne Anderson	11.977
29	26	Gary McDonald	Sean McDonald	12.422
30	3	Jake Johnson	Jan Boehler	12.324
Official qualifying results

== Race ==
Laps: 213

Pos	Grid	No	Driver	Team	Laps	Points	Status
1	3	7	Doug Coby	Tommy Baldwin	213	48	Running
2	15	07	Patrick Emerling	Jennifer Emerling	213	42	Running
3	7	16	Ron Silk	Ron Silk	213	41	Running
4	12	10	Dylan Slepian	Rob Pelis	213	40	Running
5	1	66	Timmy Solomito	Jerry Solomito	213	40	Running
6	20	87	John Baker	Daryl Baker	213	38	Running
7	28	15	Kyle Soper	Wayne Anderson	213	37	Running
8	16	5	John Beatty Jr.	Mark Mina	213	36	Running
9	2	58	Eric Goodale	Edgar Goodale	213	35	Running
10	6	22	Kyle Bonsignore	Kyle Bonsignore	213	34	Running
11	17	49	Chris Young	Chris Young	212	33	Running
12	18	54	Tommy Catalano	David Catalano	212	32	Running
13	13	64	Austin Beers	Mike Murphy	212	31	Running
14	10	50	Ronnie Williams	Paul Les	212	30	Running
15	11	34	J. B. Fortin	Nicole Fortin	211	29	Running
16	22	81	Chris Turbush	Patrick Kennedy	211	28	Running
17	27	79	Jon McKennedy	Tim Lepine	208	27	Running
18	21	36	Dave Sapienza	Judy Thilberg	207	26	Running
19	9	18	Ken Heagy	Robert Pollifrone	206	25	Running
20	24	03	Tom Rogers Jr.	Ken Darch	206	24	Running
21	25	78	Walter Sutcliffe Jr.	Steven Sutcliffe	206	23	Running
22	29	26	Gary McDonald	Sean McDonald	202	22	Running
23	19	2	J. R. Bertuccio	Joseph Bertuccio	144	21	Handling
24	30	3	Jake Johnson	Jan Boehler	143	20	Running
25	5	51	Justin Bonsignore	Kenneth Massa	143	19	Running
26	4	82	Craig Lutz	Danny Watts Jr.	124	18	Crash
27	8	96	Matt Brode	Howie Brode	123	17	Crash
28	23	88	Roger Turbush	Patrick Kennedy	87	16	Crash
29	14	02	Joey Coulter	Joey Coulter	83	15	Crash
30	26	01	Melissa Fifield	Kenneth Fifield	9	14	Handling
Official race results

=== Race statistics ===
- Lead changes: 3
- Cautions/Laps: 5 cautions for 34 laps
- Time of race: 0:56:02
- Average speed: 57.02-mile-per-hour (91.76 km/h)

Previous race: 2022 Virginia is for Racing Lovers 150	NASCAR Whelen Modified Tour; 2022 season	Next race: 2022 Granite State Derby
