= 2022 Granite State Derby =

Race details
- Race 4 of 16 in the 2022 NASCAR Whelen Modified Tour season
- Date: May 21, 2022
- Location: Lee USA Speedway in Lee, New Hampshire
- Course: Permanent racing facility
- Course length: 0.60 km (3/8 miles)
- Distance: 175 laps, 65.244 mi (105 km)
- Average speed: 70.289

Pole position
Driver	Jake Johnson	Jan Boehler
- Time: 14.747

Most laps led
Driver	Matt Hirschman	Roy Hall
- Laps: 100

Winner
No. 7	Doug Coby	Tommy Baldwin Racing

Television in the United States
- Network: FloSports

The 2022 Granite State Derby was a NASCAR Whelen Modified Tour race that was held on May 21, 2022. It was contested over 175 laps on the 3/8-mile (0.60 km) oval. It was 4th race of the 2022 NASCAR Whelen Modified Tour season. After winning in his first start of the season, Doug Coby collected the victory, going 2-for-2 on the season.

== Report ==
=== Entry list ===
- (R) denotes rookie driver.
- (i) denotes driver who is ineligible for series driver points.

No.	Driver	Owner
01	Melissa Fifield	Kenneth Fifield
2	J. R. Bertuccio	Joseph Bertuccio
3	Jake Johnson	Jan Boehler
6	Sam Rameau	Sam Rameau
7	Doug Coby	Tommy Baldwin
16	Ron Silk	Ron Silk
18	Ken Heagy	Robert Pollifrone
22	Kyle Bonsignore	Kyle Bonsignore
26	Gary McDonald	Sean McDonald
34	J. B. Fortin	Nicole Fortin
36	David Sapienza	Judy Thilberg
47	Jacob Perry	Cory Plummer
51	Justin Bonsignore	Kenneth Massa
54	Tommy Catalano	David Catalano
58	Eric Goodale	Edgar Goodale
60	Matt Hirschman	Roy Hall
64	Austin Beers	Mike Murphy
78	Walter Sutcliffe Jr.	Steven Sutcliffe
79	Jon McKennedy	Tim Lepine
82	Craig Lutz	Danny Watts Jr.
92	Anthony Nocella	Anthony Nocella
98	Steven Dickey Jr.	Cory Plummer
Official entry list

== Practice ==
Pos	No.	Driver	Owner	Time	Speed
1	60	Matt Hirschman	Roy Hall	14.785	91.309
2	7	Doug Coby	Tommy Baldwin	14.795	91.247
3	3	Jake Johnson	Jan Boehler	14.858	90.86
Official first practice results

== Qualifying ==
=== Qualifying results ===
Pos	No	Driver	Team	Time
1	3	Jake Johnson	Jan Boehler	14.747
2	60	Matt Hirschman	Roy Hall	17.786
3	7	Doug Coby	Tommy Baldwin	14.868
4	22	Kyle Bonsignore	Kyle Bonsignore	14.894
5	79	Jon McKennedy	Tim Lepine	14.903
6	64	Austin Beers	Mike Murphy	14.928
7	58	Eric Goodale	Edgar Goodale	14.966
8	82	Craig Lutz	Danny Watts Jr.	14.994
9	16	Ron Silk	Ron Silk	14.999
10	51	Justin Bonsignore	Kenneth Massa	15.009
11	6	Sam Rameau	Sam Rameau	15.009
12	36	Dave Sapienza	Judy Thilberg	15.013
13	34	J. B. Fortin	Nicole Fortin	15.022
14	54	Tommy Catalano	David Catalano	15.042
15	47	Jacob Perry	Cory Plummer	15.227
16	26	Gary McDonald	Sean McDonald	15.256
17	98	Steve Dickey Jr.	Cory Plummer	15.332
18	78	Walter Sutcliffe Jr.	Steven Sutcliffe	15.739
19	01	Melissa Fifield	Kenneth Fifield	15.749
Official qualifying results

== Race ==
Laps: 181

Pos	Grid	No	Driver	Team	Laps	Points	Status
1	3	7	Doug Coby	Tommy Baldwin	181	47	Running
2	5	79	Jon McKennedy	Tim Lepine	181	42	Running
3	2	60	Matt Hirschman	Roy Hall	181	43	Running
4	9	16	Ron Silk	Ron Silk	181	40	Running
5	1	3	Jake Johnson	Jan Boehler	181	40	Running
6	4	22	Kyle Bonsignore	Kyle Bonsignore	181	38	Running
7	6	64	Austin Beers	Mike Murphy	181	37	Running
8	13	34	J. B. Fortin	Nicole Fortin	181	36	Running
9	7	58	Eric Goodale	Edgar Goodale	181	35	Running
10	10	51	Justin Bonsignore	Kenneth Massa	181	34	Running
11	14	54	Tommy Catalano	David Catalano	181	33	Running
12	11	6	Sam Rameau	Sam Rameau	180	32	Running
13	12	36	Dave Sapienza	Judy Thilberg	180	31	Running
14	8	82	Craig Lutz	Danny Watts Jr.	180	30	Running
15	15	47	Jacob Perry	Cory Plummer	178	29	Running
16	17	98	Steven Dickey Jr.	Cory Plummer	176	28	Running
17	18	78	Walter Sutcliffe Jr.	Steven Sutcliffe	175	27	Running
18	16	26	Gary McDonald	Sean McDonald	166	26	Running
19	19	01	Melissa Fifield	Kenneth Fifield	108	25	Power steering
Official race results

=== Race statistics ===
- Lead changes: 3
- Cautions/Laps: 5 cautions for 24 laps
- Time of race: 0:57:10
- Average speed: 70.289 mph

Previous race: 2022 Miller Lite 200	NASCAR Whelen Modified Tour; 2022 season	Next race: 2022 Jennerstown Salutes 150
