= 2022 New Smyrna Visitors Bureau 200 =

2022 New Smyrna Visitors Bureau 200 #lovensb
Race details
- Race 1 of 16 in the 2022 NASCAR Whelen Modified Tour season
- Date: February 12, 2022
- Location: New Smyrna Speedway in New Smyrna Speedway
- Course: Permanent racing facility
- Course length: 0.8 km (0.5 miles)
- Distance: 200 laps, 100.00 mi (160.934 km)
- Average speed: 62.424

Pole position
Driver	Matt Hirschman	Roy Hall
- Time: 17.462

Most laps led
Driver	Matt Hirschman	Roy Hall
- Laps: 112

Winner
No. 60	Matt Hirschman	Roy Hall

The 2022 New Smyrna Visitors Bureau 200 was a NASCAR Whelen Modified Tour race that was held on February 12, 2022. It was contested over 200 laps on the 0.48-mile (0.77 km) short track. It was the first race of the 2022 NASCAR Whelen Modified Tour season. Matt Hirschman, driving for owner Roy Hall, collected his first victory of the season.

== Report ==
=== Entry list ===
- (R) denotes rookie driver.
- (i) denotes driver who is ineligible for series driver points.

No.	Driver	Owner
1	Melissa Fifield	Kenneth Fifield
02	Joey Coulter	Joey Coulter
2	J. R. Bertuccio Jr.	Joseph Bertuccio
3	Ryan Preece	Jan Boehler
5	Kyle Ebersole	Bob Ebersole
07	Patrick Emerling	Jennifer Emerling
7	Mike Christopher Jr.	Tommy Baldwin
16	Ron Silk	Ron Silk
18	Ken Heagy	Robert Pollifrone
20	Edward McCarthy	Edward McCarthy Jr.
21	Jimmy Blewett	Jon Bertuccio
22	Kyle Bonsignore	Kyle Bonsignore
24	Andrew Krause	Diane Krause
26	Gary McDonald	Sean McDonald
28	Paul Charette	Shawn Brule
29	Spencer Davis	Spencer Davis
32	Tyler Rypkema	Dean Rypkema
34	J. B. Fortin	Nicole Fortin
36	David Sapienza	Judy Thilberg
49	Chris Young	Chris Young
50	Ron Williams Jr.	Paul Les
51	Justin Bonsignore	Kenneth Massa
54	Tommy Catalano	David Catalano
55	Jeremy Gerstner	Dawn Gerstner
58	Eric Goodale	Edgar Goodale
59	Matt Kimball	Jody Lauzon
60	Matt Hirschman	Roy Hall
64	Austin Beers	Mike Murphy
70	Dylan Slepian	Steve Seuss
79	Jon McKennedy	Tim Lepine
82	Craig Lutz	Danny Watts Jr.
Official entry list

== Practice ==
Pos	No.	Driver	Owner	Manufacturer	Time	Speed
1	51	Justin Bonsignore	Kenneth Massa	Chevrolet	17.691	101.747
2	79	Jon McKennedy	Tim Lepine	Chevrolet	17.703	101.678
3	16	Ron Silk	Ron Silk	Chevrolet	17.714	101.615
Official first practice results

== Qualifying ==
=== Qualifying results ===
Pos	No	Driver	Owner	Manufacturer	Time
1	60	Matt Hirschman	Roy Hall	Chevrolet	17.462
2	3	Ryan Preece	Jan Boehler	Chevrolet	17.522
3	22	Kyle Bonsignore	Kyle Bonsignore	Chevrolet	17.540
4	50	Ronnie Williams	Paul Les	Ford	17.572
5	51	Justin Bonsignore	Kenneth Massa	Chevrolet	17.584
6	79	Jon McKennedy	Tim Lepine	Chevrolet	17.597
7	2	J. R. Bertuccio	Joseph Bertuccio	Chevrolet	17.625
8	64	Austin Beers	Mike Murphy	Toyota	17.633
9	7	Mike Christopher Jr.	Tommy Baldwin	Chevrolet	17.633
10	34	J. B. Fortin	Nicole Fortin	Chevrolet	17.646
11	36	Dave Sapienza	Judy Thilberg	Chevrolet	17.669
12	32	Tyler Rypkema	Dean Rypkema	Chevrolet	17.688
13	58	Eric Goodale	Edgar Goodale	Chevrolet	17.698
14	82	Craig Lutz	Danny Watts Jr.	Chevrolet	17.719
15	21	Jimmy Blewett	Jon Bertuccio	Chevrolet	17.737
16	49	Chris Young	Chris Young	Chevrolet	17.751
17	07	Patrick Emerling	Jennifer Emerling	Chevrolet	17.755
18	54	Tommy Catalano	David Catalano	Chevrolet	17.761
19	16	Ron Silk	Ron Silk	Chevrolet	17.803
20	29	Spencer Davis	Spencer Davis	Ford	17.808
21	70	Dylan Slepian	Steve Seuss	Chevrolet	17.826
22	5	Kyle Ebersole	Bob Ebersole	Ford	17.827
23	28	Paul Charette	Shawn Brule	Chevrolet	17.895
24	02	Joey Coulter	Joey Coulter	Chevrolet	17.939
25	20	Ed McCarthy	Ed McCarthy Jr.	Chevrolet	18.023
26	24	Andrew Krause	Diane Krause	Chevrolet	18.093
27	18	Ken Heagy	Robert Pollifrone	Chevrolet	18.093
28	59	Matt Kimball	Jody Lauzon	Dodge	18.110
29	55	Jeremy Gerstner	Dawn Gerstner	Chevrolet	18.143
30	26	Gary McDonald	Sean McDonald	Chevrolet	18.430
31	01	Melissa Fifield	Kenneth Fifield	Chevrolet	18.430
Official qualifying results

== Race ==
Laps: 200

Pos	Grid	No	Driver	Owner	Manufacturer	Laps	Points	Status
1	1	60	Matt Hirschman	Roy Hall	Chevrolet	200	48	Running
2	13	58	Eric Goodale	Edgar Goodale	Chevrolet	200	42	Running
3	8	7	Mike Christopher Jr.	Tommy Baldwin	Chevrolet	200	42	Running
4	6	79	Jon McKennedy	Tim Lepine	Chevrolet	200	40	Running
5	12	32	Tyler Rypkema	Dean Rypkema	Chevrolet	200	40	Running
6	14	82	Craig Lutz	Danny Watts Jr.	Chevrolet	200	38	Running
7	19	16	Ron Silk	Ron Silk	Chevrolet	200	38	Running
8	18	54	Tommy Catalano	David Catalano	Chevrolet	200	36	Running
9	17	07	Patrick Emerling	Jennifer Emerling	Chevrolet	200	35	Running
10	2	3	Ryan Preece	Jan Boehler	Chevrolet	200	35	Running
11	9	64	Austin Beers	Mike Murphy	Toyota	200	33	Running
12	4	50	Ronnie Williams	Paul Les	Ford	200	32	Running
13	15	21	Jimmy Blewett	Jon Bertuccio	Chevrolet	200	31	Running
14	10	34	J. B. Fortin	Nicole Fortin	Chevrolet	199	30	Running
15	3	22	Kyle Bonsignore	Kyle Bonsignore	Chevrolet	199	29	Running
16	20	29	Spencer Davis	Spencer Davis	Ford	199	28	Running
17	11	36	Dave Sapienza	Judy Thillberg	Chevrolet	198	27	Running
18	7	2	J. R. Bertuccio	Joseph Bertuccio	Chevrolet	198	26	Running
19	28	59	Matt Kimball	Jody Lauzon	Dodge	197	25	Running
20	25	20	Eddie McCarthy	Ed McCarthy Jr.	Chevrolet	197	24	Running
21	21	70	Dylan Slepian	Steve Seuss	Chevrolet	197	23	Running
22	27	18	Ken Heagy	Robert Pollifrone	Chevrolet	195	22	Running
23	23	28	Paul Charette	Shawn Brule	Chevrolet	194	21	Running
24	30	26	Gary McDonald	Sean McDonald	Chevrolet	191	20	Running
25	24	02	Joey Coulter	Joey Coulter	Chevrolet	149	19	Electrical
26	22	5	Kyle Ebersole	Bob Ebersole	Ford	148	18	Crash
27	31	55	Jeremy Gerstner	Dawn Gerstner	Chevrolet	147	17	Crash
28	16	49	Chris Young	Chris Young	Chevrolet	142	16	Crash
29	26	24	Andrew Krause	Diane Krause	Chevrolet	140	15	Crash
30	29	01	Melissa Fifield	Kenneth Fifield	Chevrolet	94	14	Handling
31	5	51	Kyle Bonsignore	Kenneth Massa	Chevrolet	32	13	Overheating
Official race results

=== Race statistics ===
- Lead changes: 6
- Cautions/Laps: 5 for 31 laps
- Time of race: 1:36:07
- Average speed: 62.424 mph

Previous race: NAPA Auto Parts Fall Final	NASCAR Whelen Modified Tour; 2022 season	Next race: 2022 Virginia is for Racing Lovers 150
