= Empire Dragway =

Drag strip in Leicester, New York

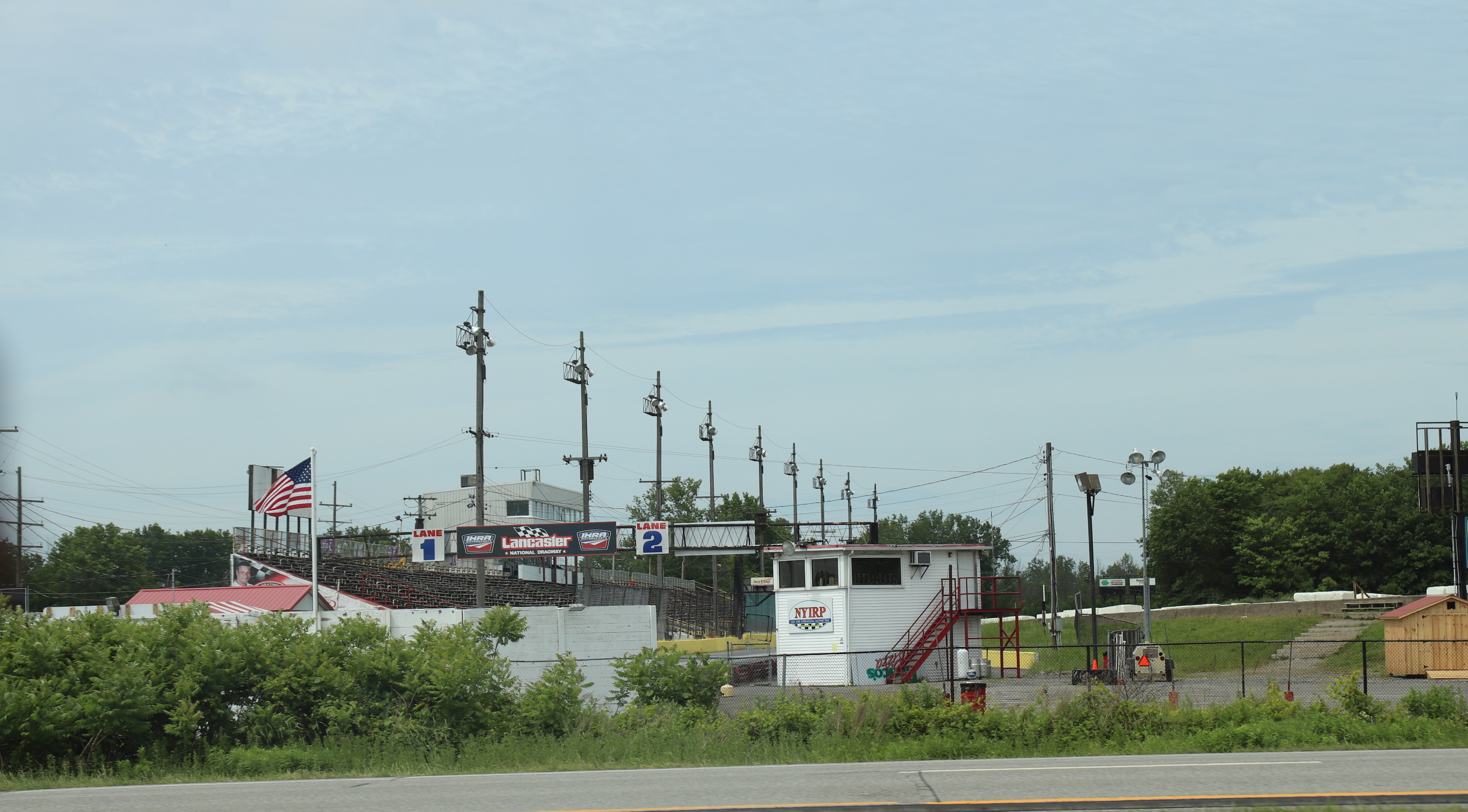
- Location: Leicester, New York
- Coordinates: 42.7986°N 77.9355°W
- Owner: Jerry and Clara Scaccia
- Opened: 1971
- Former names: Dragway 36, Motorcity Raceway, New York International Raceway Park
- Website: www.empiredragway.com
- Surface: Asphalt
- Length: .4 km (0.25 mi)

Empire Dragway, formerly known as New York International Raceway Park, is a quarter-mile drag strip located in Leicester, New York.

== Overview ==
The track first opened on August 29, 1971. The track was first owned by Peter Geib and Ron Mangone and Abe Hamza. Mr. Hamza was a concert promoter and Mr. Mangone was a successful contractor. Corwin Boddy designed the property area and Mr. Mangone's company built the track. Originally proposed as a full motorsports complex, there were ambitious plans to build a motorsports facility that would host oval racing, a full road course (which was to utilize the dragstrip as the front straight, as well as the dragstrip itself. The track faced major financial difficulties from the start and was eventually taken over by Livingston County for unpaid taxes in the mid-80s. The track fell into disrepair and suffered some other damage due to being inoperative for nearly two years without proper maintenance.

The facility was originally called Empire Dragway, then became Dragway 36, followed by Motor City Raceway and New York International Raceway Park. The track's original name--"Empire Dragway", was resurrected following the 2008 season. The track still boasts the longest shutdown area on the East Coast, at 3,000 feet (910 m).

The longest running consecutive seasons occurred while it was owned and operated by Bob and Donna Metcalfe, who acquired it in 1986. It had an abbreviated opening season beginning in August of that year. Their first full season in 1987 had sanctioning from NHRA (National Hot Rod Association). In anticipation of hosting future National Events, a change of sanctioning bodies was made to IHRA (International Hot Rod Association) in 1989 and held its first IHRA Empire Nationals the following year. Many schedule changes and facility improvements were made under Metcalfe's ownership.

At the end of the 2013 season, a Livingston County successful businessman, Jerry Scaccia and wife Clara, purchased the facility and intended to operate it on Wednesday, Friday and Saturday nights. The track has undergone many major improvements since the change in ownership—long needed basic maintenance, repaving, a new competitor entrance was constructed which made easier access for racers, much needed new drainage, rebuilt timing tower, updated timing system, improved lighting and installation of concrete barriers running the full length of the strip on both sides, with other minor changes as well. The Scaccia's first season began 4/19/2014; the inaugural full season ended 10/25/2014. The Scaccia's still own and operate the facility and continue to make further updates and improvements.

== Events ==
On Friday evenings from May through October, the track was open to everyone for test and tune, and on Saturdays the track runs its full bracket points program for paid purses. Since 2022, events have been sanctioned by the World Drag Racing Alliance (WDRA).
