= 2017 NASCAR Whelen Modified Tour =

NASCAR season

The 2017 NASCAR Whelen Modified Tour was the 33rd season of the Whelen Modified Tour (WMT), a stock car racing tour sanctioned by NASCAR. It began with the Performance Plus 150 presented by Safety-Kleen at Myrtle Beach Speedway on March 18 and concluded with the Sunoco World Series 150 at Thompson Speedway Motorsports Park on October 15. Doug Coby entered the season as the defending Driver's Champion. 2017 marked the first season of the unification of the Whelen (Northern) Modified Tour and the Whelen Southern Modified Tour. Doug Coby won the championship, six points in front of Timmy Solomito.

== Drivers ==
No.	Manufacturer	Car Owner	Race Driver	Crew Chief
00	Chevrolet	Brian Brady	Les Hinckley III (R) 1	Scott Anderson
00	Chevrolet	Brian Brady	Ted Christopher 1	Scott Anderson
00	Chevrolet	Brian Brady	Jon McKennedy 5	Scott Anderson
00	Chevrolet	Brian Brady	Ron Silk 1	Scott Anderson
00	Chevrolet	Brian Brady	Andy Seuss 1	Scott Anderson
0	Chevrolet	Joe Ambrose	Tom Rogers Jr. 1	Unknown
01	Chevrolet	Kenneth Fifield	Melissa Fifield	Glen Billings 12
01	Chevrolet	Kenneth Fifield	Melissa Fifield	Eric Pelletier 3
01	Chevrolet	Kenneth Fifield	Melissa Fifield	Jake Rheaume 1
1	Ford	Kim Myers	Burt Myers 2	Bobby Foley
2	Chevrolet	Mike Smeriglio III	Doug Coby	Phil Moran
3	Chevrolet	Jan Boehler	Rowan Pennink	Greg Fournier
04	Chevrolet	Mike Curb	Gary Putnam 1	Donald Tarantino
5	Chevrolet	Bob Ebersole	Kyle Ebersole 4	Bob Ebersole
06	Chevrolet	Michelle Biondolillo	Vincent Biondolillo (R) 1	Andrew Biondolillo
6	Chevrolet	Ed Partridge	Ryan Preece 14	Jeff Preece
6	Chevrolet	Ed Partridge	George Brunnhoelzl III 1	Jeff Preece
6	Chevrolet	Ed Partridge	Jon McKennedy 1	Jeff Preece
07	Chevrolet	Jennifer Emerling	Patrick Emerling 5	Jan Leaty
7	Chevrolet	Tommy Baldwin Jr.	Donny Lia 5	Tommy Baldwin Jr.
7	Chevrolet	Tommy Baldwin Jr.	Woody Pitkat 1	Tommy Baldwin Jr.
09	Chevrolet	Jeff Goodale	Brad Vanhouten (R) 1	William Renton Jr.
10	Chevrolet	Erin Solomito	Jerry Solomito 1	Ed Bennett
11	Chevrolet	Eddie Harvey	Andy Seuss 5	Justin Link 5
11	Chevrolet	Eddie Harvey	Chase Dowling 1	Eddie Harvey 2
11	Chevrolet	Eddie Harvey	Burt Myers 1	Eddie Harvey 2
14	Ford	Bobby Hutchens Jr. 1	Trey Hutchens 1	Bobby Hutchens Jr. 1
14	Ford	Brian Midgett 2	Cory Osland (R) 2	Michael Midgett 2
15	Chevrolet	Grady Jeffreys Jr. 1	Jeremy Gerstner 1	Kevin Jasper 1
15	Chevrolet	Rob Fuller 8	Chase Dowling 8	Steve Garrepy 8
15	Chevrolet	Wayne Anderson 1	Kyle Soper (R) 1	Tom Soper 1
16	Ford	Eric Sanderson	Timmy Solomito	Sly Szaban
17	Chevrolet	John Ellwood Jr.	Kyle Ellwood 4	Jarod Zeltmann
17	Chevrolet	John Ellwood Jr.	John Baker (R) 1	Jarod Zeltmann
18	Chevrolet	Greg Gorman	Ken Heagy 2	Greg Gorman
20	Chevrolet	Ken Zachem	Max Zachem 12 (Note: Max Zachem drove in the Whelen Modified All-Star Shootout with car number 4.)	Steve Lemay 13
20	Chevrolet	Ken Zachem	Shawn Solomito 1 (Note: Shawn Solomito drove the No. 20 in place of Max Zachem. Zachem suffered a broken nose the weekend before so he was unable to race.)	Steve Lemay 13
20	Chevrolet	Ken Zachem	Danny Cugini (R) 1	Max Zachem 1
21	Chevrolet	Joe Bertuccio Sr.	Ronnie Williams (R) 10	Joe Bertuccio 7
21	Chevrolet	Joe Bertuccio Sr.	Ronnie Williams (R) 10	Stash Butova 3
22	Chevrolet	Kyle Bonsignore	Kyle Bonsignore 4	Bill Bonsignore 1
22	Chevrolet	Kyle Bonsignore	Kyle Bonsignore 4	Unknown 3
23	Chevrolet	Jason Sechrist	Troy Talman 1	Jason Sechrist
24	Chevrolet	Cliff Krause	Andrew Krause 10	John Cooke
26	Chevrolet	Sean McDonald	Gary McDonald 11	Chad McDonald 8
26	Chevrolet	Sean McDonald	Gary McDonald 11	Gary McDonald 3
28	Chevrolet	George Brunnhoelzl Jr.	George Brunnhoelzl III 1	Unknown
29	Chevrolet	George Bock	Brendon Bock 8	Glenn Dixon
33	Ford 10	Wade Cole	Wade Cole	Jake Marosz 4
33	Chevrolet 6	Wade Cole	Wade Cole	Rick Rodenbaugh 12
36	Chevrolet	Judy Thilberg	Dave Sapienza	Tommy Grasso
38	Chevrolet	Linda Rodenbaugh	Gary Byington (R) 3	Bobby Bourne
38	Chevrolet	Linda Rodenbaugh	Dave Salzarulo 4	Bobby Bourne
38	Chevrolet	Linda Rodenbaugh	Manny Dias (R) 2	Bobby Bourne
38	Chevrolet	Linda Rodenbaugh	Kyle Ellwood 2	Bobby Bourne
39	Chevrolet	Joe Carroll	Calvin Carroll (R)	Joe Carroll 3
39	Chevrolet	Joe Carroll	Calvin Carroll (R)	Geary Rinehimer 13
40	Chevrolet	Gina Fleming	Danny Bohn 2	Frank Fleming
44	Chevrolet	Sully Tinio	Bobby Santos III 9	Bob Santos 8
44	Chevrolet	Sully Tinio	Bobby Santos III 9	Steve Lemay 1
45	Chevrolet	Chuck Steuer	Dillon Steuer (R) 3	Butch Capuano
46	Chevrolet	Russell Goodale	Woody Pitkat 7	Doug Ogiejko
46	Chevrolet	Russell Goodale	Craig Lutz 9	Doug Ogiejko
48	Chevrolet	Wayne Anderson	Shawn Solomito 4	Jerry Solomito Sr. 4
48	Chevrolet	Wayne Anderson	Kyle Soper (R) 1	Tom Soper 1
51	Chevrolet	Ken Massa	Justin Bonsignore	Danny Laferriere 7
51	Chevrolet	Ken Massa	Justin Bonsignore	Bill Michael 9
52	Chevrolet	Erika Pitkat	Woody Pitkat 1	Unknown
56	Toyota 1	Renee Lutz	Craig Lutz 6	Eric Lutz 4
56	Chevrolet 5	Renee Lutz	Craig Lutz 6	Aaron Clifford 2
58	Chevrolet	Edgar Goodale	Eric Goodale	Jason Shephard
60	Chevrolet	Roy Hall	Matt Hirschman 3	James Gouldey 1
60	Chevrolet	Roy Hall	Matt Hirschman 3	Unknown 2
63	Chevrolet	Steve Pickens	Austin Pickens (R) 3	Rob Fuller
64	Chevrolet	Mike Murphy	Rob Summers	Russell Montgomery 1
64	Chevrolet	Mike Murphy	Rob Summers	Ron Yuhas Jr. 14
64	Chevrolet	Mike Murphy	Rob Summers	Steve Lemay 1
66	Chevrolet	Jerry Solomito Sr.	Shawn Solomito 2	Jerry Solomito Sr.
70	Chevrolet	Dawn Gerstner 1	Jeremy Gerstner 1	Unknown 1
70	Chevrolet	Steve Seuss 3	Andy Seuss 3	Steve Seuss 3
72	Chevrolet	Rusty Edgerton	Lauren Edgerton (R) 1	Lauren Edgerton
74	Chevrolet	Marie Benevento	C. J. Lehmann (R) 4	Michael LaMura 1
74	Chevrolet	Marie Benevento	C. J. Lehmann (R) 4	John Visconti III 2
74	Chevrolet	Marie Benevento	C. J. Lehmann (R) 4	Bill Loecher 1
75	Chevrolet	Wayne Anderson 2	Shawn Solomito 2	Jerry Solomito Sr. 2
75	Chevrolet	Sean McDonald 1	Jeremy Gerstner 1	Chad McDonald 1
76	Chevrolet	John Blewett Sr.	Jimmy Blewett 4	Rob Ormsbee
77	Chevrolet	Mike Curb	Gary Putnam 6	Teddy Musgrave Jr. 8 Donald Tarantino 1
77	Chevrolet	Mike Curb	Ryan Newman 2	Teddy Musgrave Jr. 8 Donald Tarantino 1
77	Chevrolet	Mike Curb	Bobby Santos III 1	Teddy Musgrave Jr. 8 Donald Tarantino 1
78	Chevrolet	Steven Sutcliffe	Walter Sutcliffe Jr. (R) 13	Kevin Anderson
82	Chevrolet	Danny Watts Jr.	Ron Silk 3	Danny Watts Jr. 8 Aaron Clifford 8
82	Chevrolet	Danny Watts Jr.	Spencer Davis 1	Danny Watts Jr. 8 Aaron Clifford 8
82	Chevrolet	Danny Watts Jr.	Ted Christopher 9	Danny Watts Jr. 8 Aaron Clifford 8
82	Chevrolet	Danny Watts Jr.	Woody Pitkat 3	Danny Watts Jr. 8 Aaron Clifford 8
84	Chevrolet	Nicole Fortin	John Fortin 1	Unknown
85	Chevrolet	Robert Katon Jr.	Todd Szegedy 7	Don Barker 11
85	Chevrolet	Robert Katon Jr.	Jeff Rocco (R) 4	Don Barker 11
85	Chevrolet	Robert Katon Jr.	Ron Silk 2	Kenny Stuart 2
88	Chevrolet	Danny Watts Jr.	Roger Turbush (R) 1	Jarod Zeltmann 1
88	Chevrolet	Danny Watts Jr.	Spencer Davis 1	Unknown 1
89	Ford	John Swanson	Matt Swanson (Note: Matt Swanson drove in the Whelen Modified All-Star Shootout with a Chevrolet engine.)	Ken Barry 13
89	Ford	John Swanson	Matt Swanson	John Swanson 3
92	Chevrolet 4	Anthony Nocella	Anthony Nocella 5	Jason Decambra
92	Ford 1	Anthony Nocella	Anthony Nocella 5	Jason Decambra
97	Chevrolet	Bryan Dauzat	Bryan Dauzat 4	Todd Cooper
99	Chevrolet	Cheryl Tomaino	Jamie Tomaino 5	Trey Tomaino
Entry list Southern Slam 150
2	Chevrolet	Mike Smeriglio III	Doug Coby	Phil Moran
7	Chevrolet	Tommy Baldwin Jr.	Ryan Preece	Tommy Baldwin Jr.
11	Chevrolet	Eddie Harvey	Corey LaJoie	Justin Link
14A	Chevrolet	Bobby Measmer Jr.	Bobby Measmer Jr.	Bobby Measmer Sr.
14	Ford	Bobby Hutchens Jr.	Trey Hutchens	Bobby Hutchens Jr.
39	Chevrolet	Joe Carroll	Calvin Carroll (R)	Geary Rinehimer
65	Chevrolet	Eddie Bohn	Danny Bohn	Eddie Bohn
72	Chevrolet	Rusty Edgerton	Lauren Edgerton (R)	Unknown
74	Chevrolet	Marie Benevento	C. J. Lehmann (R)	John Visconti III
75	Chevrolet	Dawn Gerstner	Jeremy Gerstner	Dawn Gerstner
77	Chevrolet	Mike Curb	Derek Kraus (R)	Teddy Musgrave Jr.
99	Chevrolet	Cheryl Tomaino	Jamie Tomaino	Trey Tomaino

== Schedule ==
The All-Star Shootout and the Southern Slam 150 did not count towards the championship. The Performance Plus 150 presented by Safety-Kleen, the Icebreaker 150, City of Hampton 150 and the Thompson 125 were shown live on FansChoice.tv. Eleven of the eighteen races in the 2017 season were televised on NBCSN on a tape delay basis.

No.	Race title	Track	Date	TV
1	Performance Plus 150 presented by Safety-Kleen	Myrtle Beach Speedway, Myrtle Beach, South Carolina	March 18	FansChoice.tv
2	Icebreaker 150	Thompson Speedway Motorsports Park, Thompson, Connecticut	April 9 (Note: The Icebreaker 150 was postponed a week because of expected inclement weather.)	FansChoice.tv
3	NAPA Auto Parts Spring Sizzler 200	Stafford Motor Speedway, Stafford, Connecticut	April 30	
4	City of Hampton 150	Langley Speedway, Hampton, Virginia	May 13	FansChoice.tv
5	Thompson 125	Thompson Speedway Motorsports Park, Thompson, Connecticut	June 14	FansChoice.tv
6	Buzz Chew Chevrolet-Cadillac 200	Riverhead Raceway, Riverhead, New York	June 24	
	Whelen Modified All-Star Shootout	New Hampshire Motor Speedway, Loudon, New Hampshire	July 14	NBCSN
7	Eastern Propane & Oil 100	New Hampshire Motor Speedway, Loudon, New Hampshire	July 15	NBCSN
8	Stafford 150	Stafford Motor Speedway, Stafford, Connecticut	August 4	
9	Bud 'King of Beers' 150	Thompson Speedway Motorsports Park, Thompson, Connecticut	August 9	NBCSN
10	Bush's Beans 150	Bristol Motor Speedway, Bristol, Tennessee	August 16	NBCSN
11	Seekonk 150	Seekonk Speedway, Seekonk, Massachusetts	August 26	NBCSN
12	Toyota Mod Classic 150 presented by McDonald's	Oswego Speedway, Oswego, New York	September 2	NBCSN
13	Miller Lite 200	Riverhead Raceway, Riverhead, New York	September 16	NBCSN
14	F. W. Webb 100	New Hampshire Motor Speedway, Loudon, New Hampshire	September 23	NBCSN
15	NAPA Fall Final	Stafford Motor Speedway, Stafford, Connecticut	October 1	NBCSN
	Southern Slam 150	Charlotte Motor Speedway, Concord, North Carolina	October 5	NBCSN
16	Sunoco World Series 150	Thompson Speedway Motorsports Park, Thompson, Connecticut	October 15	NBCSN

Notes

- The race at the Waterford Speedbowl was originally scheduled for 22 July, but was removed from the schedule by NASCAR on 6 April following the track owner's arrest a week earlier.

== Results and standings ==
=== Races ===
No.	Race	Pole position	Most laps led	Winning driver	Manufacturer
1	Performance Plus 150 presented by Safety-Kleen	Rob Summers	Rob Summers	Timmy Solomito	Ford
2	Icebreaker 150	Timmy Solomito	Rowan Pennink	Rowan Pennink	Chevrolet
3	NAPA Auto Parts Spring Sizzler 200	Doug Coby	Doug Coby	Ryan Preece	Chevrolet
4	City of Hampton 150	Doug Coby	Doug Coby	Timmy Solomito	Ford
5	Thompson 125	Donny Lia	Ryan Preece	Ryan Preece	Chevrolet
6	Buzz Chew Chevrolet-Cadillac 200	Timmy Solomito	Timmy Solomito	Timmy Solomito	Ford
	Whelen Modified All-Star Shootout	Rowan Pennink^{1}	Ryan Newman	Ryan Preece	Chevrolet
7	Eastern Propane & Oil 100	Ryan Preece^{2}	Ryan Preece	Bobby Santos III	Chevrolet
8	Stafford 150	Craig Lutz	Doug Coby	Ryan Preece	Chevrolet
9	Bud 'King of Beers' 150	Rowan Pennink	Ryan Preece	Ryan Preece	Chevrolet
10	Bush's Beans 150	Patrick Emerling	Patrick Emerling	Patrick Emerling	Chevrolet
11	Seekonk 150	Matt Hirschman	Doug Coby	Doug Coby	Chevrolet
12	Toyota Mod Classic 150 presented by McDonald's	Matt Hirschman	Matt Hirschman	Ryan Preece	Chevrolet
13	Miller Lite 200	Timmy Solomito	Timmy Solomito	Timmy Solomito	Ford
14	F. W. Webb 100	Ryan Newman	Doug Coby	Bobby Santos III	Chevrolet
15	NAPA Fall Final	Ryan Preece	Ryan Preece	Eric Goodale	Chevrolet
	Southern Slam 150	Doug Coby	Doug Coby	Doug Coby	Chevrolet
16	Sunoco World Series 150	Chase Dowling	Doug Coby	Timmy Solomito	Ford

Notes

- ^{1} – There was no qualifying session for the Whelen Modified All-Star Shootout. The starting grid was decided with a random draw.
- ^{2} – The qualifying session for the Eastern Propane & Oil 100 was cancelled due to weather. The starting line-up was decided by Practice results.

=== Drivers' championship ===
(key) Bold – Pole position awarded by time. Italics – Pole position set by final practice results or Owners' points. * – Most laps led.

Pos	Driver	MYR	THO	STA	LGY	THO	RIV	NHA‡	NHA	STA	THO	BRI	SEE	OSW	RIV	NHA	STA	CLT‡	THO	Points
1	Doug Coby	13	31	**2***	**15***	4	3	5	11	2*	2	2	1*	4	2	14*	6	**1***	5*	604
2	Timmy Solomito	1	**2**	11	1	8	**1***	9	29	4	4	15	22	3	**1***	24	5		1	598
3	Justin Bonsignore	6	9	9	5	14	5	17	17	3	11	3	6	6	5	5	7		10	588
4	Rowan Pennink	7	1*	6	7	2	7	13	9	17	**7**	7	12	10	21	2	23		4	570
5	Eric Goodale	18	5	4	2	5	6	16	15	13	8	16	14	5	9	6	1		16	566
6	Ryan Preece	4	28	1		1*	4	1	2*	1	1*	5	3	1	4		**2***	10	26	562
7	Dave Sapienza	24	11	10	14	20	2	8	3	7	16	20	5	9	14	18	12		8	511
8	Matt Swanson	11	7	14	10	12	13	12	28	10	17	10	4	12	19	12	27		14	484
9	Rob Summers	**2***	27	13	6	15	16		21	6	18	25	11	11	10	21	19		12	474
10	Craig Lutz	29	19	7	12	22	12			**8**	12	17	13	7	18	27	9		20	429
11	Wade Cole	20	20	17	19	17	25		27	25	21	13	10	16	13	19	20		18	404
12	Calvin Carroll **(R)**	28	18	25	13	18	19		19	21	20	24	25	15	17	17	15	3	15	395
13	Woody Pitkat	8	8	12	16	11	17		13	18	10					8	25		7	375
14	Max Zachem	5	3	21	4	10	10	10	8	19	15		8	8	INQ		Wth			373
15	Melissa Fifield	27	23	24	21	19	24		22	28	25	21	17	21	23	20	22		30	337
16	Bobby Santos III		4			3		18	1	11	5	9	Wth			1	8		29	334
17	Chase Dowling		25	3		21			5		14	4				15	4		**2**	304
18	Walter Sutcliffe Jr. **(R)**		22	18	20	24				14	24	14	20	19	12	28	26		27	304
19	Ted Christopher			5		7	11	7	7	26	3	22	15	17	DNS†					303
20	Andrew Krause		16	26		9			16	12	6		23			16	13		6	297
21	Ronnie Williams **(R)**						21		12	15		8	16	13	11	13	24		25	283
22	Ron Silk	16	13	8				11	30							7	3		3	231
23	Brendon Bock		12		11	26	22		4	20	13					23				221
24	Shawn Solomito	21	29	19		25	14		10	22			21		15					220
25	Gary Putnam	14		15	17	13				9				14					11	215
26	Andy Seuss	3	17	Wth	22	28		4	6			6				25			33	213
27	Jon McKennedy					6				5	9		24			11	14			196
28	Patrick Emerling		6					3	31			**1***		18		3				167
29	Gary McDonald		26	Wth			26		Wth	16	Wth		9		20	Wth	21		31	159
30	Kyle Ellwood	15	14	16	Wth										8		16			151
31	Todd Szegedy	26	10	23	24	27		19	25	24										149
32	Anthony Nocella			27					Wth				2			10	11		32	149
33	Kyle Bonsignore	19			3							19					10			126
34	Donny Lia	22		22		**23**		6	26							4				124
35	Kyle Ebersole				9			14	14			11		20						122
36	Bryan Dauzat		15			16		15	20			12								113
37	C. J. Lehmann **(R)**						18			23	19				6			7		110
38	Matt Hirschman	17											**7**	**2**						109
39	Jamie Tomaino	25			Wth			20	18							22		4	9	102
40	Dillon Steuer **(R)**						9				22				7					94
41	Burt Myers	10										26							13	83
42	Jeff Rocco **(R)**						15				23		19	Wth						75
43	Dave Salzarulo								24	27	26					26				73
44	Danny Bohn	12			8													2		68
45	Jeremy Gerstner	23			Wth^{1}							18						11		66
46	Austin Pickens **(R)**											23					17		28	64
47	Kyle Soper **(R)**														3				24	62
48	Ryan Newman							2*	23							**9**				58
49	Cory Osland **(R)**														16				22	50
50	George Brunnhoelzl III			20	18															50
51	Spencer Davis				23														17	48
52	Manny Dias **(R)**												18						23	47
53	Jimmy Blewett		24	Wth	Wth														19	45
54	Tom Rogers Jr.						8													36
55	Ken Heagy																18		34	36
56	Les Hinckley III **(R)**	9																		35
57	Gary Byington **(R)**		30	28		Wth														30
58	Vincent Biondolillo **(R)**						20													24
59	Brad Vanhouten **(R)**		21																	23
60	Danny Cugini **(R)**																		21	23
61	Roger Turbush **(R)**														22					22
62	Jerry Solomito						23													21
63	Lauren Edgerton **(R)**				25													8		19
64	John Baker **(R)**																		35	9
	Trey Hutchens	Wth																12		0
	Troy Talman		Wth																	0
	John Fortin														Wth					0
Drivers ineligible for Whelen Modified Tour points
	Bobby Measmer Jr.																	5		
	Derek Kraus **(R)**																	6		
	Corey LaJoie																	9		
Pos	Driver	MYR	THO	STA	LGY	THO	RIV	NHA‡	NHA	STA	THO	BRI	SEE	OSW	RIV	NHA	STA	CLT‡	THO	Points

Notes

- ^{‡} – Non-championship round.
- ^{1} – Jeremy Gerstner received championship points, despite the fact that he withdrew prior to the race.
- ^{†} – Ted Christopher died in a plane crash near the North Branford and Guilford, Connecticut town line while en routing to Riverhead Raceway.

== See also ==
- 2017 Monster Energy NASCAR Cup Series
- 2017 NASCAR Xfinity Series
- 2017 NASCAR Camping World Truck Series
- 2017 NASCAR K&N Pro Series East
- 2017 NASCAR K&N Pro Series West
- 2017 NASCAR Pinty's Series
- 2017 NASCAR PEAK Mexico Series
- 2017 NASCAR Whelen Euro Series
