= 2016 NASCAR Whelen Southern Modified Tour =

The 2016 NASCAR Whelen Southern Modified Tour was the twelfth and final season of the NASCAR Whelen Southern Modified Tour (WSMT). It began at Caraway Speedway on March 12 and concluded at Charlotte Motor Speedway on October 6. Andy Seuss entered the season as the defending Drivers' Champion. Burt Myers won the championship, 20 points in front of George Brunnhoelzl III.

The 2016 season was the final season before NASCAR merged the two modified tours for 2017, and the series itself would not return until 2021, where it was revived under the SMART Modified Tour name.

== Drivers ==
No.	Manufacturer	Car Owner	Race Driver	Crew Chief
00	Chevrolet	Brian Brady	Ted Christopher 1	Scott Anderson
1	Ford	Kim Myers	Burt Myers	Marty Edwards
2	Chevrolet	Joe Bertuccio Sr.	J. R. Bertuccio 6 (Note: J. R. Bertuccio drove in the Bush's Beans 150 with car number 21.)	Joe Bertuccio Sr.
4	Ford	Gary Myers	Jason Myers	Mike Queen
5	Ford	Bob Ebersole	Kyle Ebersole 9	Bob Ebersole
6	Chevrolet	Constance Partridge	Ryan Preece 1	Jeff Preece
7	Chevrolet	Mark Hunter	Lauren Edgerton (R) 2	Mark Hunter
8	Chevrolet	Bobby Baldwin	Dalton Baldwin 4	Bobby Baldwin
11	Chevrolet	Eddie Harvey	Andy Seuss	Eddie Harvey
13	Chevrolet	Amy Fleming	Chris Fleming 2	Mike Boight 1
13	Chevrolet	Amy Fleming	Chris Fleming 2	Frank Fleming 1
14	Chevrolet	Bobby Hutchens Jr.	Trey Hutchens 9	Bobby Hutchens Jr.
15	Chevrolet	Grady Jeffreys Jr.	Jeremy Gerstner	Grady Jeffreys Sr.
16	Chevrolet	Jeremy Gerstner	Shawn Balluzzo (R) 1	TBA
22	Chevrolet	Kyle Bonsignore	Kyle Bonsignore (R)	Bill Bonsignore
28	Chevrolet	George Brunnhoelzl Jr.	George Brunnhoelzl III	George Brunnhoelzl Jr.
29	Chevrolet	George Bock	Brendon Bock 1	Glenn Dixon
33	Chevrolet	Gary Fountain Sr.	Austin Pickens (R) 7	Michael Williams
40	Chevrolet	Gina Fleming	Danny Bohn	Chris Fleming 10
40	Chevrolet	Gina Fleming	Danny Bohn	Frank Fleming 1
46	Chevrolet	Russell Goodale	Jeff Goodale 1	Doug Ogiejko
70	Chevrolet	Dawn Gerstner 3	Shawn Balluzzo (R) 4	Denzil Cormican 2
70	Chevrolet	Jeremy Gerstner 1	Shawn Balluzzo (R) 4	Jeremy McIntosh 2
74	Chevrolet	Kevin Hughes	Bobby Measmer Jr.	Bobby Measmer Sr.
77	Chevrolet	Mike Curb	Gary Putnam 10	Teddy Musgrave Jr. 7 Ray Holm 1 Teddy Christopher Jr. 3
77	Chevrolet	Mike Curb	Ryan Preece 1	Teddy Musgrave Jr. 7 Ray Holm 1 Teddy Christopher Jr. 3
79	Pontiac	Susan Hill	Richie Pallai Jr. 4	David Hill
79	Pontiac	Susan Hill	James Civali 4	David Hill
79	Pontiac	Susan Hill	Robert Babb (R) 1	David Hill
79	Pontiac	Susan Hill	David Calabrese 1	David Hill
97	Chevrolet	Bryan Dauzat	Bryan Dauzat 9	Todd Cooper
99	Chevrolet	Susanne Winstead	A. J. Winstead 3	Reginald Winstead

== Schedule ==
Four of the eleven races in the 2016 season were televised on NBCSN and were on a tape delay basis.

No.	Race title	Track	Date	TV
1	Davis Roofing 150	Caraway Speedway, Asheboro, North Carolina	March 12	
2	Spring Explosion 150	Concord Speedway, Midland, North Carolina	April 2 (Note: The Southern Sizzler 150 was postponed from March 19 to April 2 because of persistent rain.)	
3	South Boston 150	South Boston Speedway, South Boston, Virginia	April 9	
4	Dogwood 150	Caraway Speedway, Asheboro, North Carolina	April 16	
5	Davis Roofing 150	Caraway Speedway, Asheboro, North Carolina	July 1	
6	Strutmasters.com 199	Bowman Gray Stadium, Winston-Salem, North Carolina	August 6	NBCSN
7	Bush's Beans 150 (Note: The Bush's Beans 150 was held as a combined event, with competitors from the Whelen Southern Modified Tour competing along with competitors for the Whelen Modified Tour. The race was run with a series-based point distribution, where drivers received points and statistical credit for their finish relative to other drivers in their series, not to the whole field in general.)	Bristol Motor Speedway, Bristol, Tennessee	August 17	NBCSN
8	Visit Martin County 150	East Carolina Motor Speedway, Robersonville, North Carolina	September 11 (Note: The Visit Martin County 150 was postponed from September 3 to September 11 due to the forecast for heavy rain and high winds as a result of Hurricane Hermine.)	
9	South Boston 150	South Boston Speedway, South Boston, Virginia	September 17	NBCSN
10	Caraway 150	Caraway Speedway, Asheboro, North Carolina	September 24	
11	Bad Boy Off Road Southern Slam 150	Charlotte Motor Speedway, Concord, North Carolina	October 6	NBCSN

== Results and standings ==
=== Races ===
No.	Race	Pole position	Most laps led	Winning driver	Manufacturer
1	Davis Roofing 150	Danny Bohn	Burt Myers	Burt Myers	Ford
2	Spring Explosion 150	Jason Myers	Ryan Preece	George Brunnhoelzl III	Chevrolet
3	South Boston 150	Burt Myers	George Brunnhoelzl III	George Brunnhoelzl III	Chevrolet
4	Dogwood 150	Danny Bohn	Burt Myers	Burt Myers	Ford
5	Davis Roofing 150	J. R. Bertuccio	J. R. Bertuccio	Andy Seuss	Chevrolet
6	Strutmasters.com 199	Kyle Ebersole	Kyle Ebersole	Burt Myers	Ford
7	Bush's Beans 150	Kyle Bonsignore	Todd Szegedy	Eric Goodale	Chevrolet
8	Visit Martin County 150	Burt Myers	Burt Myers	Bobby Measmer Jr.	Chevrolet
9	South Boston 150	Danny Bohn	Danny Bohn	James Civali	Pontiac
10	Caraway 150	Andy Seuss	Burt Myers	George Brunnhoelzl III	Chevrolet
11	Bad Boy Off Road Southern Slam 150	George Brunnhoelzl III	George Brunnhoelzl III	Ryan Preece	Chevrolet

=== Drivers' championship ===
(key) Bold – Pole position awarded by time. Italics – Pole position set by final practice results or Owner's points. * – Most laps led.

Pos	Driver	CRW	CON	SBO	CRW	CRW	BGS	BRI	ECA	SBO	CRW	CLT	Points
1	Burt Myers	1*	3	**2**	1*	4	1	28	**5***	5	2*	6	465
2	George Brunnhoelzl III	7	1	1*	5	3	14	34	6	3	1	**2***	445
3	Andy Seuss	5	4	3	4	1	3	11	7	10	**4**	7	442
4	Danny Bohn	**3**	10	5	**3**	8	11	16	2	**4***	5	4	432
5	Bobby Measmer Jr.	2	6	11	9	5	4	17	1	6	9	5	426
6	Jason Myers	4	**5**	9	2	11	2	29	4	8	3	9	418
7	Kyle Bonsignore **(R)**	15	8	4	6	7	13	25	8	2	6	8	401
8	Jeremy Gerstner	10	13	DNS^{1}	13	6	16	20	3	9	7	11	379
9	Kyle Ebersole	16	16	7	8	DNQ^{2}	**10***	9		7		12	310
10	Gary Putnam	14	9	6	11	9	5	18	12	DNS^{1}	Wth	INJ	310
11	Bryan Dauzat	11	15		10	Wth	6	31		11	10	13	265
12	Trey Hutchens	Wth	11		Wth	10	9		9	12	11	10	236
13	Austin Pickens **(R)**	12	17	8	14	DNQ^{2}	8	37					222
14	J. R. Bertuccio	13	7		7	**2***	12	35					213
15	James Civali						17	26		1		3	151
16	Richie Pallai Jr.	9	14	10	12								131
17	Shawn Balluzzo **(R)**					12	7			13	Wth	14	130
18	Ryan Preece		12*					6^{3}				1	81
19	Lauren Edgerton **(R)**								11	14			63
20	Dalton Baldwin					Wth	15				Wth	15	58
21	A. J. Winstead						Wth			15		16	57
22	Ted Christopher		2										43
23	Brendon Bock	6						36^{3}					38
24	Jeff Goodale	8						10^{3}					36
25	David Calabrese										8		36
26	Robert Babb **(R)**								10				35
	Chris Fleming						Wth					Wth	0
Drivers ineligible for Whelen Southern Modified Tour points
	Eric Goodale							1					
	Todd Szegedy							**2***					
	Donny Lia							3					
	Patrick Emerling							4					
	Doug Coby							5					
	Bobby Santos III							7					
	Ron Silk							8					
	Matt Swanson **(R)**							12					
	Ryan Newman							13					
	Max Zachem							14					
	Chase Dowling							15					
	Jimmy Blewett							19					
	Jamie Tomaino							21					
	Wade Cole							22					
	Gary McDonald							23					
	Melissa Fifield							24					
	Timmy Solomito							27					
	Rob Summers							30					
	Rowan Pennink							32					
	Justin Bonsignore							33					
	Ken Heagy							Wth					
	Dave Sapienza							Wth					
Pos	Driver	CRW	CON	SBO	CRW	CRW	BGS	BRI	ECA	SBO	CRW	CLT	Points

Notes

- ^{1} – Jeremy Gerstner and Gary Putnam received championship points, despite the fact that they did not start the race.
- ^{2} – Kyle Ebersole and Austin Pickens received championship points, despite the fact that they did not qualify for the race.
- ^{3} – Scored points towards the Whelen Modified Tour.

== See also ==
- 2016 NASCAR Sprint Cup Series
- 2016 NASCAR Xfinity Series
- 2016 NASCAR Camping World Truck Series
- 2016 NASCAR K&N Pro Series East
- 2016 NASCAR K&N Pro Series West
- 2016 NASCAR Whelen Modified Tour
- 2016 NASCAR Pinty's Series
- 2016 NASCAR Whelen Euro Series
