= 2016 NASCAR Whelen Modified Tour =

The 2016 NASCAR Whelen Modified Tour was the thirty-second season of the Whelen Modified Tour (WMT). It began with the Icebreaker 150 at Thompson Speedway Motorsports Park on April 10 and concluded with the Sunoco World Series 150 at the same venue on October 16. Doug Coby entered the season as the defending Drivers' Champion and he won the championship for the fourth time, twelve points in front of Justin Bonsignore.

Melissa Fifield, the only female driver to compete in the series in 2016, was voted by the fans as the most popular driver for the third consecutive year.

== Drivers ==
No.	Manufacturer	Car Owner	Race Driver	Crew Chief
00	Chevrolet	Brian Brady	Ted Christopher 2	Scott Anderson
0	Chevrolet	Joe Ambrose	Tom Rogers Jr. 2	Helmut Losching
01	Chevrolet	Kenneth Fifield	Melissa Fifield	Kenneth Fifield
2	Chevrolet	Mike Smeriglio III	Doug Coby	Phil Moran
3	Chevrolet	Jan Boehler	Rowan Pennink	Greg Fournier
4	Dodge	Robert Garbarino	Jimmy Blewett 16 (Note: Jimmy Blewett drove in the Bush's Beans 150 with car number 41.)	P. J. Fearns
4	Dodge	Robert Garbarino	Chuck Hossfeld 1	P. J. Fearns
5	Chevrolet	Raymond Bouchard 1	Frank Vigliarolo Jr. 2	Raymond Bouchard 1
5	Chevrolet	Tim Thilberg 1	Frank Vigliarolo Jr. 2	Tommy Grasso 1
06	Chevrolet	Michelle Biondolillo	Vincent Biondolillo (R) 2	Andrew R. Biondolillo
6	Chevrolet	Constance Partridge	Ryan Preece 9	Jeff Preece
07	Chevrolet	Jennifer Emerling	Patrick Emerling 7	Jan Leaty
7	Chevrolet	Mike Curb	Gary Putnam 1	Mike Hann 1
7	Chevrolet	Mike Curb	Ryan Newman 2	Teddy Musgrave Jr. 2
8	Chevrolet	Mark Sypher	Donny Lia	Don Barker 16
8	Chevrolet	Mark Sypher	Donny Lia	Robert Katon Jr. 1
9	Chevrolet	Robert Katon Jr.	Chase Dowling	Robert Katon Jr. 3
9	Chevrolet	Robert Katon Jr.	Chase Dowling	Mark Dowling 14
10	Chevrolet	Erin Solomito	Jerry Solomito Jr. (R) 1	Jerry Solomito Sr.
13	Chevrolet	Ashley Katon	Anthony Nocella (R) 1	Don Adams
15	Chevrolet	Monica Fuller	Todd Szegedy 3 (Note: Todd Szegedy drove in the Bush's Beans 150 with car number 05.)	Ryan Stone 1
15	Chevrolet	Monica Fuller	Todd Szegedy 3	Rob Fuller 2
16	Ford	Eric Sanderson	Timmy Solomito	Sly Szaban
17	Chevrolet	John Ellwood Jr.	Kyle Ellwood 2	Jarod Zeltmann
18	Chevrolet	Robert Pollifrone	Ken Heagy 16	Greg Gorman
20	Chevrolet	Ken Zachem	Max Zachem	Shawn Ruszczyk
21	Chevrolet	Joe Bertuccio Sr.	J. R. Bertuccio 1	Joe Bertuccio Sr.
24	Chevrolet	Cliff Krause	Andrew Krause (R) 11	Ralph Solhem 2
24	Chevrolet	Cliff Krause	Andrew Krause (R) 11	John Cooke 9
26	Chevrolet	Sean McDonald	Gary McDonald	Chad McDonald 10
26	Chevrolet	Sean McDonald	Gary McDonald	Sean McDonald 7
28	Chevrolet	George Brunnhoelzl Jr.	George Brunnhoelzl III 1	George Brunnhoelzl Jr.
29	Chevrolet	George Bock	Brendon Bock 13	Glenn Dixon
32	Chevrolet	Tom Abele Sr.	Tom Abele Jr. 1	Tom Abele Sr.
33	Chevrolet	Beth Cole 3	Wade Cole (Note: Wade Cole drove in the Bush's Beans 150 with car number 38.)	Rick Rodenbaugh
33	Chevrolet	Wade Cole 14	Wade Cole	Rick Rodenbaugh
34	Chevrolet	Tom Soper	Kyle Soper (R) 2	Jarod Zeltmann
36	Chevrolet	Judy Thilberg	Dave Sapienza	Tommy Grasso
38	Chevrolet	Linda Rodenbaugh 8 Wade Cole 2	Troy Talman 1	Mike Talman 1
38	Chevrolet	Linda Rodenbaugh 8 Wade Cole 2	Tom Rogers Jr. 1	Michael Berner 1
38	Chevrolet	Linda Rodenbaugh 8 Wade Cole 2	Johnny Bush 1	Bobby Bourne 8
38	Chevrolet	Linda Rodenbaugh 8 Wade Cole 2	Dave Salzarulo 4	Bobby Bourne 8
38	Chevrolet	Linda Rodenbaugh 8 Wade Cole 2	Gary Byington (R) 3	Bobby Bourne 8
39	Chevrolet	Calvin Carroll	Calvin Carroll (R) 2	Joe Carroll
44	Chevrolet	Mike Curb	Bobby Santos III	Steve Lemay 9
44	Chevrolet	Mike Curb	Bobby Santos III	Ryan Stone 8
46	Chevrolet	Russell Goodale	Jeff Goodale	Doug Ogiejko
51	Chevrolet	Ken Massa	Justin Bonsignore	Bill Michael
56	Chevrolet	Renee Lutz	Craig Lutz (R) 16	Eric Lutz 14
56	Chevrolet	Renee Lutz	Craig Lutz (R) 16	Jason Sechrist 2
58	Chevrolet	Edgar Goodale	Eric Goodale	Jason Shephard
59	Chevrolet	Ed Bennett III	Nick Salva (R) 4	Bob Buffington
60	Chevrolet	Roy Hall	Matt Hirschman 1	TBA
64	Chevrolet	Mike Murphy	Rob Summers	Ron Yuhas Jr. 4
64	Chevrolet	Mike Murphy	Rob Summers	Steve Dodge 13
68	Chevrolet	Michael Loomis	Johnny Bush 2	Michael Loomis
69	Chevrolet	Jason Blatz	Jason Agugliaro (R) 1	Jason Blatz
70	Chevrolet	Steve Seuss	Andy Seuss 2	Steve Seuss
71	Chevrolet	Danny Watts Jr.	Jimmy Zacharias 2	TBA
75	Chevrolet	Wayne Anderson	Shawn Solomito 12	Aaron Clifford
77	Chevrolet	Mike Curb	Gary Putnam 1	Mike Hann 1
77	Chevrolet	Mike Curb	Ryan Newman 1	Teddy Musgrave Jr. 1
78	Chevrolet	Steven Sutcliffe	Walter Sutcliffe Jr. (R) 8 (Note: Walter Sutcliffe Jr. drove in the Stafford 150 with car number 76.)	Kevin Anderson
82	Chevrolet	Danny Watts Jr.	Ron Silk	Buddy Loecher
84	Chevrolet	Nicole Fortin	John Fortin 1	TBA
85	Chevrolet	Kevin Stuart	Woody Pitkat 13	Kenny Stuart 9
85	Chevrolet	Kevin Stuart	Woody Pitkat 13	Greg Felton 4
89	Chevrolet	John Swanson	Matt Swanson (R)	Ken Barry
97	Chevrolet	Bryan Dauzat	Bryan Dauzat 1	Todd Cooper
99	Chevrolet	Brittany Tomaino	Jamie Tomaino	George Ratajczak

== Schedule ==
The Whelen All-Star Shootout did not count towards the championship. Nine of the eighteen races in the 2016 season were televised on NBCSN and were on a tape delay basis. The Icebreaker 150 was shown live on FansChoice.tv.

No.	Race title	Track	Date	TV
1	Icebreaker 150	Thompson Speedway Motorsports Park, Thompson, Connecticut	April 10	FansChoice.tv
2	NAPA Spring Sizzler 200	Stafford Motor Speedway, Stafford, Connecticut	April 24	
3	New England Cycle Center 161	Waterford Speedbowl, Waterford, Connecticut	May 14	
4	TSI Harley-Davidson 125	Stafford Motor Speedway, Stafford, Connecticut	June 3	
5	Thompson 125	Thompson Speedway Motorsports Park, Thompson, Connecticut	June 15	NBCSN
6	Riverhead 200	Riverhead Raceway, Riverhead, New York	June 25	
	All-Star Shootout	New Hampshire Motor Speedway, Loudon, New Hampshire	July 15	NBCSN
7	New England 100	New Hampshire Motor Speedway, Loudon, New Hampshire	July 16	NBCSN
8	Dunleavy's 200	Monadnock Speedway, Winchester, New Hampshire	July 24 (Note: The Dunleavy's 200 was postponed a day because of persistent rain.)	
9	Stafford 150	Stafford Motor Speedway, Stafford, Connecticut	August 5	
10	Budweiser King of Beers 150	Thompson Speedway Motorsports Park, Thompson, Connecticut	August 10	NBCSN
11	Bush's Beans 150 (Note: The Bush's Beans 150 was held as a combined event, with competitors from the Whelen Modified Tour competing along with competitors for the Whelen Southern Modified Tour. The race was run with a series-based point distribution, where drivers received points and statistical credit for their finish relative to other drivers in their series, not to the whole field in general.)	Bristol Motor Speedway, Bristol, Tennessee	August 17	NBCSN
12	Riverhead 200	Riverhead Raceway, Riverhead, New York	August 27	NBCSN
13	Toyota Mod Classic 150 presented by McDonald's	Oswego Speedway, Oswego, New York	September 3	
14	AnytimeRealty.com 150	Seekonk Speedway, Seekonk, Massachusetts	September 10	
15	F. W. Webb 100	New Hampshire Motor Speedway, Loudon, New Hampshire	September 24	NBCSN
16	NAPA Fall Final 150	Stafford Motor Speedway, Stafford, Connecticut	October 9 (Note: The NAPA Fall Final 150 was postponed a week due to the forecast for heavy rain and high winds throughout the weekend.)	NBCSN
17	Sunoco World Series 150 presented by XtraMart	Thompson Speedway Motorsports Park, Thompson, Connecticut	October 16	NBCSN

== Results and standings ==
=== Races ===
No.	Race	Pole position	Most laps led	Winning driver	Manufacturer
1	Icebreaker 150	Doug Coby	Ryan Preece	Timmy Solomito	Ford
2	NAPA Spring Sizzler 200	Doug Coby	Doug Coby	Doug Coby	Chevrolet
3	New England Cycle Center 161	Eric Goodale	Ron Silk	Ron Silk	Chevrolet
4	TSI Harley-Davidson 125	Doug Coby	Doug Coby	Doug Coby	Chevrolet
5	Thompson 125	Doug Coby	Max Zachem	Bobby Santos III	Chevrolet
6	Riverhead 200	Doug Coby	Doug Coby	Timmy Solomito	Ford
	All-Star Shootout	J. R. Bertuccio^{1}	Woody Pitkat	Bobby Santos III	Chevrolet
7	New England 100	Ron Silk	Doug Coby	Doug Coby	Chevrolet
8	Dunleavy's 200	Timmy Solomito	Timmy Solomito	Timmy Solomito	Ford
9	Stafford 150	Doug Coby	Doug Coby	Jimmy Blewett	Dodge
10	Budweiser King of Beers 150	Doug Coby	Justin Bonsignore	Justin Bonsignore	Chevrolet
11	Bush's Beans 150	Todd Szegedy	Todd Szegedy	Eric Goodale	Chevrolet
12	Riverhead 200	Shawn Solomito	Justin Bonsignore	Justin Bonsignore	Chevrolet
13	Toyota Mod Classic 150 presented by McDonald's	Bobby Santos III	Doug Coby	Doug Coby	Chevrolet
14	AnytimeRealty.com 150	Doug Coby	Doug Coby	Timmy Solomito	Ford
15	F. W. Webb 100	Woody Pitkat^{2}	Justin Bonsignore	Justin Bonsignore	Chevrolet
16	NAPA Fall Final 150	Doug Coby	Doug Coby	Doug Coby	Chevrolet
17	Sunoco World Series 150 presented by XtraMart	Timmy Solomito	Timmy Solomito	Justin Bonsignore	Chevrolet

Notes

- ^{1} – There was no qualifying session for the All-Star Shootout. The starting grid was decided with a random draw.
- ^{2} – The qualifying session for the F. W. Webb 100 was cancelled due to heavy rain. The starting line-up was decided by Practice results.

=== Drivers' championship ===
(key) Bold – Pole position awarded by time. Italics – Pole position set by final practice results or 2015 Owner's points. * – Most laps led.

Pos	Driver	THO	STA	WAT	STA	THO	RIV	NHA‡	NHA	MON	STA	THO	BRI	RIV	OSW	SEE	NHA	STA	THO	Points
1	Doug Coby	**4**	**1***	8	**1***	**11**	**10***	5	1*	6	**20***	**2**	5	15	1*	**3***	3	**1***	6	684
2	Justin Bonsignore	3	5	17	5	20	2	7	8	5	2	1*	33	1*	3	2	1*	4	1	672
3	Timmy Solomito	1	4	15	23	15	1	8	12	**1***	8	12	27	2	2	1	9	2	**5***	638
4	Donny Lia	6	15	9	3	14	3	12	2	10	18	8	3	16	15	15	10	23	4	577
5	Max Zachem	12	10	2	10	2*	6		32	7	7	6	14	8	20	13	8	7	13	576
6	Jimmy Blewett	8	31	3	2	9	4	15	20	3	1	14	19	6	INJ	7	7	3	3	574
7	Eric Goodale	7	24	**20**	4	12	7	2	9	4	5	15	1	10	17	6	16	19	8	570
8	Ron Silk	5	26	1*	7	21	19	3	**4**	17	6	7	8	14	9	16	2	11	18	565
9	Matt Swanson **(R)**	15	11	7	17	3	9		13	12	21	16	12	18	21	12	4	8	9	543
10	Chase Dowling	11	8	24	16	25	8	13	11	16	4	11	15	5	8	9	11	5	22	543
11	Rowan Pennink	9	3	18	6	7	21	6	14	2	25	25	32	11	7	8	20	6	14	533
12	Bobby Santos III	13	7	26	8	1	12	1	27	20	17	3	7	28	**13**	5	26	18	15	507
13	Jeff Goodale	24	28	4	12	5	17		28	21	12	10	10	19	14	10	12	12	12	499
14	Jamie Tomaino	17	16	10	15	26	11	20	24	15	11	18	21	12	16	19	17	15	11	481
15	Rob Summers	18	12	5	24	22	20		19	9	14	17	30	26	4	17	15	Wth	21	441
16	Dave Sapienza	19	13	22	13	27	5		18	14	23	19	Wth	23	12	11	23	14	10	438
17	Craig Lutz **(R)**	26	21	11	14	23	16		21	13	10	21		7	10	14	22	13	25	437
18	Gary McDonald	22	22	12	20	13	26		26	19	19	24	23	13	18	21	18	24	16	418
19	Wade Cole	23	23	25	21	18	18		29	18	16	20	22	27	19	27	19	16	17	397
20	Woody Pitkat	10	25	19	25	29		19*	7	8	9	4				20	24	9	7	377
21	Shawn Solomito	16	6		11	16	24			23	15	9		**3**			13	10	27	356
22	Brendon Bock	20	9	6	9	8	13		15	11	3	13	36	Wth	Wth					354
23	Melissa Fifield	27	27	28	22	19	27		31	22	22	23	24	29	DNQ^{2}	26	25	20	19	341
24	Ryan Preece	2*	30			6	23	4	6			5	6					Wth	2	277
25	Patrick Emerling	14	Wth			4		9	3				4		5		6			228
26	Ken Heagy	Wth	18	13	18	10	14		30	Wth	24	Wth	Wth	25	Wth	Wth		22	Wth	222
27	Andrew Krause **(R)**	21	19	23	19	17			23		13	22				Wth		Wth	Wth	195
28	Todd Szegedy		2					14	10				**2***							120
29	Ryan Newman							10	5				13				5			111
30	Walter Sutcliffe Jr. **(R)**		Wth	21		28					Wth	Wth			Wth			17	20	90
31	Nick Salva **(R)**		29	27		24										18				78
32	Gary Byington **(R)**															23	21		24	64
33	Jimmy Zacharias														11		14			63
34	Ted Christopher		14	14																61
35	Johnny Bush			DNQ^{2}										22		24				57
36	Frank Vigliarolo Jr.						25							9						54
37	Tom Rogers Jr.		32				Wth							4						52
38	Vincent Biondolillo **(R)**						15							21						52
39	Dave Salzarulo				26				33	Wth								25		48
40	Kyle Ellwood		QL^{1}															21	23	44
41	Gary Putnam		20					18	25				18^{3}							43
42	Matt Hirschman															4				40
43	Chuck Hossfeld														6					38
44	Calvin Carroll **(R)**															25			26	37
45	Tom Abele Jr.			16																28
46	Andy Seuss							11	16	Wth			11^{3}							28
47	George Brunnhoelzl III		17										34^{3}							27
48	J. R. Bertuccio							17	17				35^{3}							27
49	Jason Agugliaro **(R)**													17						27
50	John Fortin													20						24
51	Kyle Soper **(R)**						22							Wth						22
52	Bryan Dauzat							16	22				31^{3}							22
53	Anthony Nocella **(R)**															22				22
54	Jerry Solomito Jr. **(R)**													24						20
55	Troy Talman	25																		19
	Jon McKennedy																		QL^{4}	
Drivers ineligible for Whelen Modified Tour points
	Kyle Ebersole												9							
	Danny Bohn												16							
	Bobby Measmer Jr.												17							
	Jeremy Gerstner												20							
	Kyle Bonsignore **(R)**												25							
	James Civali												26							
	Burt Myers												28							
	Jason Myers												29							
	Austin Pickens **(R)**												37							
Pos	Driver	THO	STA	WAT	STA	THO	RIV	NHA‡	NHA	MON	STA	THO	BRI	RIV	OSW	SEE	NHA	STA	THO	Points

Notes

- ^{‡} – Non-championship round.
- ^{1} – Kyle Ellwood qualified in the No. 6 for Ryan Preece.
- ^{2} – Johnny Bush and Melissa Fifield received championship points, despite the fact that they did not qualify for the race.
- ^{3} – Scored points towards the Whelen Southern Modified Tour.
- ^{4} – Jon McKennedy qualified in the No. 6 for Ryan Preece.

== See also ==
- 2016 NASCAR Sprint Cup Series
- 2016 NASCAR Xfinity Series
- 2016 NASCAR Camping World Truck Series
- 2016 NASCAR K&N Pro Series East
- 2016 NASCAR K&N Pro Series West
- 2016 NASCAR Whelen Southern Modified Tour
- 2016 NASCAR Pinty's Series
- 2016 NASCAR Whelen Euro Series
