= Kevin Goodale =

American racing driver

- Nationality: American
- Born: September 26, 1980 (age 46) Riverhead, New York, U.S.

NASCAR Whelen Modified Tour career
- Years active: 2003–2012
- Starts: 105
- Championships: 0
- Wins: 0
- Poles: 0
- Best finish: 12th in 2008
- Statistics up to date as of August 11, 2024.

Kevin Goodale (born September 26, 1980) is an American former professional stock car racing driver who competed in the NASCAR Whelen Modified Tour from 2003 to 2012. He is the older brother of Eric Goodale, and the first cousin of Jeff Goodale, who have both competed in the Modified Tour.

Goodale has also competed in the now defunct NASCAR Whelen Southern Modified Tour, the Race of Champions Asphalt Modified Tour, and the World Series of Asphalt Stock Car Racing Series.

== Motorsports results ==
=== NASCAR ===
(key) (Bold – Pole position awarded by qualifying time. Italics – Pole position earned by points standings or practice time. * – Most laps led.)

==== Whelen Modified Tour ====
NASCAR Whelen Modified Tour results
Year	Car owner	No.	Make	1	2	3	4	5	6	7	8	9	10	11	12	13	14	15	16	17	18	19	NWMTC	Pts	Ref
2003	Edgar Goodale	58	Chevy	TMP	STA	WFD	NZH	STA; DNQ	LER	BLL; DNQ	BEE	NHA	ADI	RIV; DNQ	TMP	STA; DNQ	WFD; 25	TMP; 33	NHA	STA; DNQ	TMP; 29		41st	543	
2004	Edgar Goodale	58	Chevy	TMP; 33	STA; DNQ	WFD; DNQ	NZH; 29	STA; 24	RIV; DNQ	LER; 15	WAL; DNQ	BEE; DNQ	NHA; 32	SEE; DNQ	RIV; 18	STA; DNQ	TMP; DNQ	WFD; 11	TMP; 10	NHA; 39	STA; DNQ	TMP; 26	26th	1388	
2005	Edgar Goodale	58	Chevy	TMP; 14	STA; 29	RIV; DNQ	WFD; DNQ	STA; 25	JEN; 16	NHA; 29	BEE; 21	SEE; 25	RIV; 15	STA; 13	TMP; 22	WFD; 15	MAR; 25	TMP; 16	NHA; 21	STA; 32	TMP; 14		16th	1737	
2006	Edgar Goodale	58	Chevy	TMP; 34	STA; 31	JEN; 22	TMP; 23	STA; 22	NHA; 34	HOL	RIV; DNQ	STA; 27	TMP; DNQ	MAR; 8	TMP; 25	NHA; 36	WFD	TMP; 13	STA; 14				27th	1214	
2007	Edgar Goodale	58	Chevy	TMP; 16	STA; 12	WTO; DNQ	STA; 25	TMP; 9	NHA; 26	TSA; 12	RIV; 17	STA; 27	TMP; 34	MAN; 20	MAR; 24	NHA; 15	TMP; 12	STA; 12	TMP; 6				15th	1715	
2008	Edgar Goodale	58	Chevy	TMP; 25	STA; 11	STA; 16	TMP; 9	NHA; 17	SPE; 27	RIV; 13	STA; 6	TMP; 33	MAN; 9	TMP; 11	NHA; 30		CHE; 11						12th	1847	
2008	Nancy Goodale	50	Chevy													MAR; 13		STA; 10	TMP; 16				12th	1847	
2009	Nancy Goodale	50	Chevy	TMP; 14	STA; 14	STA; 23	NHA; 18	SPE; Wth	RIV; 13	STA; 27	BRI	TMP; 29	NHA; 20	MAR; 5	STA; 29	TMP; 8							20th	1203	
2010	Nancy Goodale	50	Chevy	TMP; 31	STA; 14	STA; 25	MAR; 17	NHA	LIM; 24	MND	RIV; 15*	STA	TMP; 28	BRI; 14	NHA; 29	STA; 22	TMP; DNQ						25th	1047	
2011	Nancy Goodale	50	Chevy	TMP; 26	STA; 26	STA; 30	MND	TMP	NHA; 15	RIV; 28	STA	NHA; 23	BRI	DEL	TMP; 18	LRP; 9	NHA	STA; 6	TMP; 29				26th	1007	
2012	Nancy Goodale	50	Chevy	TMP; 12	STA; 28	MND	STA	WFD	NHA	STA	TMP	BRI	TMP	RIV	NHA	STA	TMP; 30						34th	62	

==== Whelen Southern Modified Tour ====
NASCAR Whelen Southern Modified Tour results
Year	Car owner	No.	Make	1	2	3	4	5	6	7	8	9	10	11	NWSMTC	Pts	Ref
2008	Edgar Goodale	58	Chevy	CRW; 14	ACE	CRW	BGS	CRW	LAN	CRW	SNM	MAR	CRW	CRW	38th	121	
