= 2021 NASCAR Whelen Modified Tour =

Auto racing season

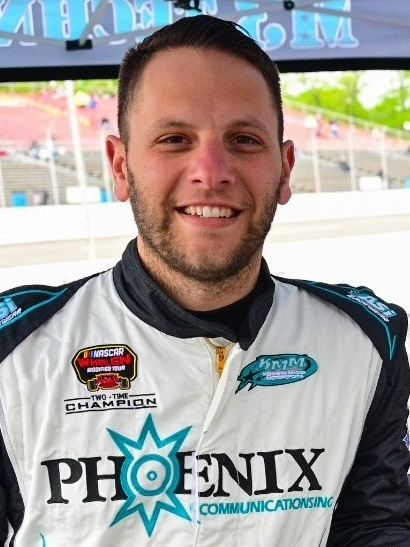
Justin Bonsignore, the 2021 Whelen Modified Tour champion. This was his second consecutive championship and third overall in the series.

The 2021 NASCAR Whelen Modified Tour was the thirty-seventh season of the Whelen Modified Tour (NWMT), a stock car racing tour sanctioned by NASCAR. It began with the Virginia is for Racing Lovers 200 at Martinsville Speedway on April 8 and concluded at Stafford Motor Speedway on September 25. Defending series champion Justin Bonsignore won another championship and his third in total after previously winning the 2018 title.

== Schedule ==
On December 11, 2020, NASCAR announced the 2021 Whelen Modified Tour schedule. Among the 14 races was an inaugural stop at New York International Raceway Park and returns to Beech Ridge Motor Speedway and Martinsville Speedway.

No.	Race title	Track	Date
1	Virginia is for Racing Lovers 200	Martinsville Speedway, Martinsville, Virginia	April 8
2	Napa Auto Parts Spring Sizzler	Stafford Motor Speedway, Stafford, Connecticut	April 30
3	Miller Lite 200	Riverhead Raceway, Riverhead, New York	May 15
4	Jennerstown Salutes 150 presented by DGV	Jennerstown Speedway, Jennerstown, Pennsylvania	May 29
5	Steel Palace 150	Oswego Speedway, Oswego, New York	June 12
6	Buzz Chew Chevrolet Cadillac 200	Riverhead Raceway, Riverhead, New York	June 20
7	Whelen 100	New Hampshire Motor Speedway, Loudon, New Hampshire	July 17
8	Nu-Way Auto Parts 150	Lancaster Motorplex, Lancaster, New York	July 31
9	GAF Roofing 150 presented by Riverhead Building Supply	Stafford Motor Speedway, Stafford, Connecticut	August 6
10	Rumble at the Ridge 200	Beech Ridge Motor Speedway, Scarborough, Maine	August 21
11	Toyota Mod Classic 150	Oswego Speedway, Oswego, New York	September 4
12	Virginia is for Racing Lovers 150	Richmond Raceway, Richmond, Virginia	September 10
13	Miller Lite 200	Riverhead Raceway, Riverhead, New York	September 18
14	NAPA Auto Parts Fall Final	Stafford Motor Speedway, Stafford, Connecticut	September 25

== Results and standings ==
=== Race results ===
No.	Race	Pole position	Most laps led	Winning driver	Manufacturer
1	Virginia Is For Racing Lovers 200	Ryan Preece	Ryan Preece	Eric Goodale	Chevrolet
2	NAPA Auto Parts Spring Sizzler	Matt Swanson	Matt Swanson	Patrick Emerling	Chevrolet
3	Miller Lite 200	Justin Bonsignore	Justin Bonsignore	Doug Coby	Chevrolet
4	Jennerstown Salutes 150 Presented by DGV	Justin Bonsignore	Justin Bonsignore	Justin Bonsignore	Chevrolet
5	Steel Palace 150	Max McLaughlin	Matt Hirschman	Matt Hirschman	Chevrolet
6	Buzz Chew Chevrolet Cadillac 200	Justin Bonsignore	Doug Coby	Doug Coby	Ford
7	Whelen 100	Justin Bonsignore	Justin Bonsignore	Ryan Preece	Chevrolet
8	Nu-Way Auto Parts 150	Jon McKennedy	Jon McKennedy	Patrick Emerling	Chevrolet
9	GAF Roofing 150 Presented by Riverhead Building Supply	Ryan Preece	Ryan Preece	Ryan Preece	Chevrolet
10	Rumble at the Ridge 200	Matt Hirschman	Matt Hirschman	Ron Silk	Chevrolet
11	Toyota Mod Classic 150	Ron Silk	Ron Silk	Ron Silk	Chevrolet
12	Virginia Is For Racing Lovers 150	Justin Bonsignore	Ryan Preece	Ryan Preece	Chevrolet
13	Riverhead Raceway	Tom Rogers Jr.	Patrick Emerling	Patrick Emerling	Chevrolet
14	NAPA Auto Parts Fall Final	Anthony Nocella	Anthony Nocella	Justin Bonsignore	Chevrolet

=== Point standings ===
(key) Bold – Pole position awarded by time. Italics – Pole position set by final practice results or rainout. * – Most laps led. ** – All laps led.

Pos	Driver	MAR	STA	RIV	JEN	OSW	RIV	NHA	NRP	STA	BEE	OSW	RCH	RIV	STA	Points
1	Justin Bonsignore	3	13	**3***	**1***	4	**3**	**2***	2	2	8	3	**24**	2	1	565
2	Patrick Emerling	8	1	2	5	3	2	13	1	7	3	15	25	1*	3	543
3	Ron Silk	21	14	7	19	10	4	3	12	5	1	**1***	19	17	8	486
4	Kyle Bonsignore	5	10	4	7	16	16	9	10	21	7	9	6	9	4	484
5	Doug Coby	6	12	1	2		1*	27	9	4	5	4	5	24	2	483
6	Eric Goodale	1	2	8	18	21	20	14	5	9	11	12	13	5	9	472
7	Woody Pitkat	9	15	5	4	6	17	11	23	6	12	8	10	6	19	466
8	Jon McKennedy	11	6	16	6	20	8	5	**4***	3	16	16	2		12	450
9	Tyler Rypkema	2	24	15	20	7	10	21	6	12	13	14	12	12	7	442
10	Anthony Nocella	23	18	14	12	9	5	16	18	11	6	5	11		**6***	422
11	J. B. Fortin	34	16	20	8	18	13	19	8	17	10	17	16	16	18	386
12	Tommy Catalano	7	3	11	9	15	6	22	17	10	18	21	Wth			345
13	Timmy Solomito		4	12	13	13	19	10	11	14	Wth			7	11	326
14	Walter Sutcliffe Jr.	26	28	19	15	23	12	20	15	23	15	19	17	19		321
15	Craig Lutz	33	5	13	3	17	23	26	22	20				23	5	295
16	Melissa Fifield	27	26	26	16	24	25	28	20	22	19	18	22	26	26	291
17	Ryan Preece	**12***	17	23		2		1		**1***			1*			268
18	Dave Sapienza	30	25	10	10		21	7		19			26	18	20	254
19	Chuck Hossfeld		8	6	Wth	14	24	25	7	Wth		13		13		242
20	Ronnie Williams	13	9					4		8			3		10	218
21	Andrew Krause	32	7			12		17		15		7	20			199
22	Max McLaughlin	4	11		11	**11**		30	3							196
23	Kyle Ebersole	24			21	5					9	10	18			177
24	Ken Heagy	Wth	21	Wth				15	13	18	Wth			21	23	153
25	Kyle Soper	25		22			7			16				4		147
26	Matt Swanson		**20***					31		13	4				17	137
27	Matt Hirschman					1*					**2***	2				134
28	Austin Beers											20	7	15	13	121
29	Bobby Santos III							8				6	23		24	115
30	Gary McDonald	20	23	25			18								25	109
31	Dylan Slepian			9			9							11		103
32	Andy Jankowiak								14				8	10		100
33	Roger Turbush			21			15							3		93
34	Bobby Measmer Jr.	14									14		15			89
35	Scott Wylie				17	19			16							80
36	Ryan Newman	29						24					4			76
37	John Baker			17			14							25		76
38	Mike Leaty					22			19			22				69
39	Andy Seuss	17						6					Wth			65
40	Tom Rogers Jr.			24			Wth							**8**		57
41	Jamie Tomaino	10											21			57
42	Gary Putnam											11			21	56
43	Matt Galko		19					18								51
44	Kyle Ellwood			18										20		50
45	Bryan Dauzat	18						23					Wth			47
46	Rob Summers	19	22													47
47	Sam Rameau	31						12								45
48	Gary Byington	22	27		Wth					Wth						39
49	Chase Dowling					8										36
50	Burt Myers												9			35
51	Mike Rutkoski						11									33
52	Timmy Catalano				14											30
53	Eddie McCarthy												14			30
54	Mike Christopher Jr.													14		30
55	Stephen Kopcik														14	30
56	Jeff Gallup	15	Wth													29
57	Joey Cipriano III														15	29
58	Jared Fryar	16														28
59	Andrew Molleur														16	28
60	Tony Ricci										17					27
61	Jim Gavek Jr.								21							23
62	Dave Brigati													22		23
63	J. R. Bertuccio						22				Wth					22
64	C. J. Lehmann														22	22
65	Jeremy Gerstner	28														16
66	Max Zachem							29								15
67	Jeff Fultz	35														9
	Bobby Labonte	Wth														
	Frank Fleming	Wth														
Pos	Driver	MAR	STA	RIV	JEN	OSW	RIV	NHA	NRP	STA	BEE	OSW	RCH	RIV	STA	Points

== See also ==
- 2021 NASCAR Cup Series
- 2021 NASCAR Xfinity Series
- 2021 NASCAR Camping World Truck Series
- 2021 ARCA Menards Series
- 2021 ARCA Menards Series East
- 2021 ARCA Menards Series West
- 2021 NASCAR Pinty's Series
- 2021 NASCAR Whelen Euro Series
- 2021 eNASCAR iRacing Pro Invitational Series
- 2021 SRX Series
- 2021 CARS Tour
- 2021 Southern Modified Auto Racing Teams season
