= Craig Lutz =

American racing driver

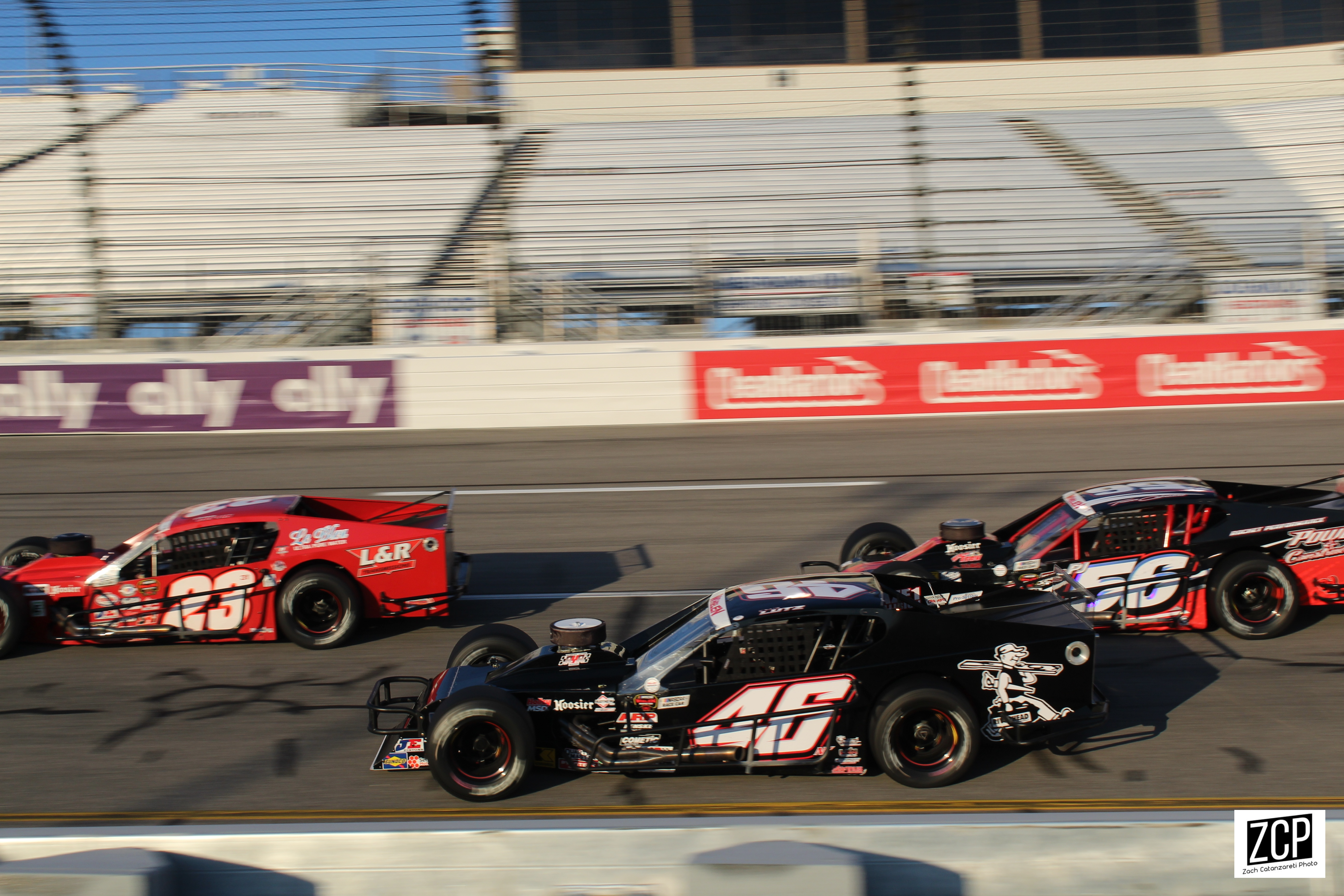
- Lutz's No. 46 car at Richmond Raceway in 2024
- Born: July 27, 1994 (age 32) Miller Place, New York, U.S.

NASCAR Whelen Modified Tour career
- Debut season: 2014
- Current team: Elite Racing
- Years active: 2014–present
- Car number: 12
- Crew chief: Joey Mucciacciaro
- Starts: 161
- Championships: 0
- Wins: 6
- Poles: 3
- Best finish: 3rd in 2025
- Finished last season: 19th (2026)
- Statistics up to date as of October 12, 2026.

Craig Lutz (born July 27, 1994) is an American professional stock car racing driver who competes part-time in the NASCAR Whelen Modified Tour, driving the No. 12 for Elite Racing. Lutz started racing Late Models before moving up to the SK Modified division at Stafford Motor Speedway, Thompson Speedway Motorsports Park, and the Waterford Speedbowl, where he won multiple feature races.

In 2026, it was revealed that Lutz would participate in the pre-season test for the ARCA Menards Series at Daytona International Speedway, driving for Fast Track Racing as a part on the Road to Daytona program, where he set the 44th quickest time between the two sessions held.

Lutz is a long-time competitor of the Modified Tour, having competed in the series since 2014. He has also competed in series such as the Modified Racing Series, the Tri-Track Open Modified Series, and the World Series of Asphalt Stock Car Racing.

== Motorsports results ==
=== NASCAR ===
(key) (Bold – Pole position awarded by qualifying time. Italics – Pole position earned by points standings or practice time. * – Most laps led.)

==== Whelen Modified Tour ====
NASCAR Whelen Modified Tour results
Year	Car owner	No.	Make	1	2	3	4	5	6	7	8	9	10	11	12	13	14	15	16	17	18	NWMTC	Pts	Ref
2014	Terry Zacharias	71	Chevy	TMP	STA	STA	WFD; 28	RIV	NHA	MND	STA	TMP	BRI	NHA	STA	TMP						49th	16	
2015	Renee Lutz	56	Chevy	TMP	STA	WAT	STA	TMP	RIV	NHA	MON	STA	TMP; 18	BRI	RIV; 21	NHA; 11	STA	TMP; 21				38th	105	
2016	Renee Lutz	56	Chevy	TMP; 26	STA; 21	WFD; 11	STA; 14	TMP; 23	RIV; 16	NHA; 21	MND; 13	STA; 10	TMP; 21	BRI	RIV; 7	OSW; 10	SEE; 14	NHA; 22	STA; 13	TMP; 25		17th	437	
2017	Renee Lutz	56	Toyota	MYR; 29																		10th	429	
2017	Renee Lutz	56	Chevy		TMP; 19	STA; 7	LGY; 12	TMP; 22	RIV; 12	NHA												10th	429	
2017	Russell Goodale	46	Chevy								**STA**; 8	TMP; 12	BRI; 17	SEE; 13	OSW; 7	RIV; 18	NHA; 27	STA; 9	TMP; 20			10th	429	
2018	Russell Goodale	46	Chevy	MYR; 9	TMP; 2	STA; 5	SEE; 10	TMP; 7	LGY; 27	RIV; 6	NHA; 19	STA; 6	TMP; 8	BRI; 11	OSW; 11	RIV; 13	NHA; 17	STA; 2	TMP; 12			5th	541	
2019	Russell Goodale	46	Chevy	MYR; 20	SBO; 10	TMP; 13	STA; 2	WAL; 26	SEE; 3	TMP; 3*	RIV; 5	NHA; 10	STA; 5	TMP; 3	OSW; 4	**RIV**; 3	NHA; 10	STA; 1	TMP; 12			4th	585	
2020	Russell Goodale	46	Chevy	JEN; 2	WMM; 8	WMM; 11	JEN; 1	MND; 10	TMP; 12	NHA; 5	STA; 13	TMP; 1										4th	342	
2021	Russell Goodale	46	Chevy	MAR; 33	STA; 5	RIV; 13	JEN; 3	OSW; 17	RIV; 23	NHA; 26	NRP; 22	STA; 20	BEE	OSW	RCH							15th	295	
2021	Danny Watts Jr.	82	Chevy													RIV; 23						15th	295	
2021	Tim Thilburg	63	Chevy														STA; 5					15th	295	
2022	Danny Watts Jr.	82	Chevy	NSM; 6	RCH; 15	RIV; 26	LEE; 14	JEN; 10	MND; 15	RIV; 15	WAL; 11	NHA; 10	CLM; 13	TMP; 1*	LGY; 9	OSW; 3	RIV; 7	TMP; 23	MAR; 23			8th	508	
2023	Danny Watts Jr.	82	Chevy	NSM; 18	RCH; 28	MON; 17	RIV; 9	LEE; 12	SEE; 11	RIV; 14	WAL; 23	NHA; 30	LMP	THO; 5	LGY; 9	OSW; 16	MON; 9	RIV; 8	NWS; 34	THO; 8	MAR; 26	7th	471	
2024	Russell Goodale	46	Chevy	**NSM**; 12	RCH; 7	THO; 6	MON; 4	RIV; 7	SEE; 19	NHA; 22	MON; 12*	LMP; 6	THO; 3	OSW; 9	RIV; 2	MON; 4	THO; 8	NWS; 12	MAR; 6			5th	575	
2025	Russell Goodale	46	Chevy	NSM; 2	THO; 13	NWS; 1*	SEE; 13	RIV; 5	WMM; 6	LMP; 9	MON; 9	MON; 12	THO; 12	RCH; 1	OSW; 2	NHA; 3	RIV; 4	THO; 5	MAR; 5			3rd	612	
2026	Russell Goodale	46	Chevy	NSM; 5	MAR; 14	THO; 8	SEE; 12	RIV; 23	OXF; Wth	SEE	CLM	WMM										19th	249	
2026	Elite Racing	12	N/A										MON; 19	THO				RIV; 10	THO			19th	249	
2026	Elite Racing	31	N/A												NHA; 12	STA	OSW					19th	249	
