= Calvin Carroll =

American racing driver

- Nationality: American
- Born: September 19, 2000 (age 26) Andover, New Jersey, U.S.

NASCAR Whelen Modified Tour career
- Debut season: 2016
- Years active: 2016–2020
- Starts: 59
- Championships: 0
- Wins: 0
- Poles: 0
- Best finish: 8th in 2020
- Statistics up to date as of August 5, 2024.

Calvin Carroll (born September 19, 2000) is an American professional stock car racing driver who competed in the NASCAR Whelen Modified Tour from 2016 to 2020.

Carroll has previously competed in series such as the Tri-Track Open Modified Series, the EXIT Realty Modified Touring Series, and the World Series of Asphalt Stock Car Racing.

== Motorsports results ==
=== NASCAR ===
(key) (Bold – Pole position awarded by qualifying time. Italics – Pole position earned by points standings or practice time. * – Most laps led.)

==== Whelen Modified Tour ====
NASCAR Whelen Modified Tour results
Year	Car owner	No.	Make	1	2	3	4	5	6	7	8	9	10	11	12	13	14	15	16	17	NWMTC	Pts	Ref
2016	Calvin Carroll	39	Chevy	TMP	STA	WFD	STA	TMP	RIV	NHA	MND	STA	TMP	BRI	RIV	OSW	SEE; 25	NHA	STA	TMP; 26	44th	37	
2017	Joe Carroll	39	Chevy	MYR; 28	TMP; 18	STA; 25	LGY; 13	TMP; 18	RIV; 19	NHA; 19	STA; 21	TMP; 20	BRI; 24	SEE; 25	OSW; 15	RIV; 17	NHA; 17	STA; 15	TMP; 15		12th	395	
2018	Joe Carroll	25	Chevy	MYR; 8	TMP; 16	STA; 29	SEE; 24	TMP; 21	LGY; 16	RIV; 23	NHA; 34	STA; 12	TMP; 19	BRI; 22	OSW; 24	RIV; 18	NHA; 31	STA; 16	TMP; 23		15th	368	
2019	Joe Carroll	25	Chevy	MYR; 21	SBO; 32	TMP; 19	STA; 19	WAL; 16	SEE; 22	TMP; 25	RIV; 28	NHA; 36	STA; 30	TMP; 16	OSW; 24	RIV; 24	NHA; 11	STA; 28	TMP; 30		19th	323	
2020	Joe Carroll	25	Ford	JEN; 5	WMM; 13																8th	290	
2020	Joe Carroll	25	Chevy			WMM; 6	JEN; 18	MND; 14	TMP; 11	NHA; 17	STA; 15	TMP; 8									8th	290	
