= Brendon Bock =

American racing driver

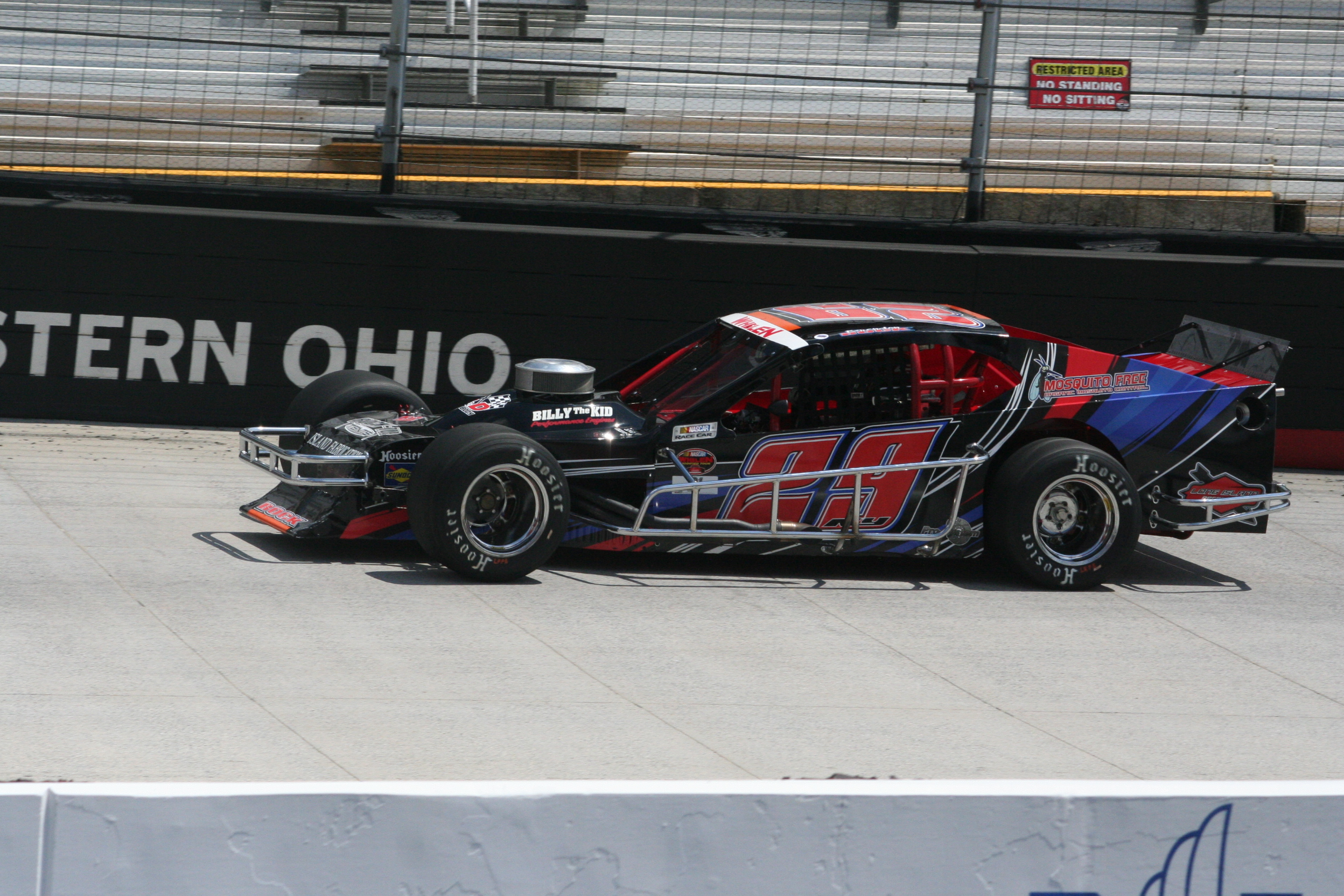
- Bock's No. 29 car at Bristol Motor Speedway in 2016
- Nationality: American
- Born: February 23, 1997 (age 29) Franklin Square, New York, U.S.

NASCAR Whelen Modified Tour career
- Debut season: 2015
- Years active: 2015–2017
- Starts: 28
- Championships: 0
- Wins: 0
- Poles: 0
- Best finish: 22nd in 2016
- Statistics up to date as of May 20, 2025.

Brendon Bock (born February 23, 1997) is an American former professional stock car racing driver who competed part-time in the NASCAR Whelen Modified Tour from 2015 to 2017.

Bock also previously competed in series such as the now defunct NASCAR Whelen Southern Modified Tour, the PASS South Super Late Model Series, the Monaco Modified Tri-Track Series, and the INEX Legends at Riverhead Raceway.

== Motorsports results ==
=== NASCAR ===
(key) (Bold – Pole position awarded by qualifying time. Italics – Pole position earned by points standings or practice time. * – Most laps led.)

==== Whelen Modified Tour ====
NASCAR Whelen Modified Tour results
| Year | Car owner | No. | Make | 1 | 2 | 3 | 4 | 5 | 6 | 7 | 8 | 9 | 10 | 11 | 12 | 13 | 14 | 15 | 16 | 17 | NWMTC | Pts | Ref |
|---|---|---|---|---|---|---|---|---|---|---|---|---|---|---|---|---|---|---|---|---|---|---|---|
| 2015 | Jon McKennedy | 29 | Ford | TMP | STA; 10 | | | | | | | | | | | | | | | | 26th | 231 | |
| 2015 | George Bock | 28 | Ford | | | WAT; 22 | | | | | | | | | | | | | | | 26th | 231 | |
| 2015 | George Bock | 29 | Ford | | | | STA; 27 | TMP; 18 | RIV; 17 | | MON; 15 | | | BRI; 21 | RIV | NHA | STA | TMP | | | 26th | 231 | |
| 2015 | George Bock | 29 | Chevy | | | | | | | NHA; 13 | | STA; 23 | TMP | | | | | | | | 26th | 231 | |
| 2016 | George Bock | 29 | Chevy | TMP; 20 | STA; 9 | WFD; 6 | STA; 9 | TMP; 8 | RIV; 13 | NHA; 15 | MND; 11 | STA; 3 | TMP; 13 | BRI; 23 | RIV; Wth | OSW; Wth | SEE | NHA | STA | TMP | 22nd | 354 | |
| 2017 | George Bock | 29 | Chevy | MYR | THO; 12 | STA | LGY; 11 | THO; 26 | RIV; 22 | NHA; 4 | STA; 20 | THO; 13 | BRI | SEE | OSW | RIV | NHA; 23 | STA | THO | | 23rd | 221 | |

==== Whelen Southern Modified Tour ====
NASCAR Whelen Southern Modified Tour results
| Year | Car owner | No. | Make | 1 | 2 | 3 | 4 | 5 | 6 | 7 | 8 | 9 | 10 | 11 | NWSMTC | Pts | Ref |
|---|---|---|---|---|---|---|---|---|---|---|---|---|---|---|---|---|---|
| 2016 | George Bock | 29 | Chevy | CRW; 6 | CON | SBO | CRW | CRW | BGS | BRI | ECA | SBO | CRW | CLT | 23rd | 38 | |
