= Walter Sutcliffe Jr. =

American racing driver

- Nationality: American
- Born: March 28, 1975 (age 51) East Haven, Connecticut, U.S.

NASCAR Whelen Modified Tour career
- Debut season: 2016
- Years active: 2016–2023
- Starts: 71
- Championships: 0
- Wins: 0
- Poles: 0
- Best finish: 14th in 2021, 2022
- Finished last season: 79th (2023)
- Statistics up to date as of October 1, 2024.

Walter Sutcliffe Jr. (born March 28, 1975) is an American professional stock car racing driver who last competed in the NASCAR Whelen Modified Tour, driving the No. 78 for Steven Sutcliffe.

Sutcliffe has previously competed in series such as the NASCAR Southeast Series, the ACT Late Model Tour, the PASS North Super Late Model Series, the Tri-Track Open Modified Series, and the EXIT Realty Modified Touring Series.

== Motorsports results ==
=== NASCAR ===
(key) (Bold – Pole position awarded by qualifying time. Italics – Pole position earned by points standings or practice time. * – Most laps led.)

==== Whelen Modified Tour ====
NASCAR Whelen Modified Tour results
Year	Team	No.	Make	1	2	3	4	5	6	7	8	9	10	11	12	13	14	15	16	17	18	NWMTC	Pts	Ref
2016	Steven Sutcliffe	78	Chevy	TMP	STA; Wth	WFD; 21	STA	TMP; 28	RIV	NHA	MND		TMP; Wth	BRI	RIV	OSW	SEE	NHA	STA; 17	TMP; 20		30th	90	
2016	Steven Sutcliffe	76	Chevy									STA; Wth										30th	90	
2017	Steven Sutcliffe	78	Chevy	MYR	THO; 22	STA; 18	LGY; 20	THO; 24	RIV	NHA	STA; 14	THO; 24	BRI; 14	SEE; 20	OSW; 19	RIV; 12	NHA; 28	STA; 26	THO; 27			18th	304	
2018	Steven Sutcliffe	78	Chevy	MYR; Wth	TMP; 35	STA; 22	SEE; 31	TMP; 25	LGY; 26	RIV; 24	NHA; 33	STA; 27	TMP; 29	BRI; Wth	OSW; Wth	RIV	NHA	STA; 30	TMP; 25			31st	177	
2019	Steven Sutcliffe	78	Chevy	MYR; 32	SBO; 20	TMP; Wth	STA; 22	WAL; Wth	SEE; DNQ	TMP; 23	RIV; Wth	NHA; 37	STA; DNQ	TMP; 29	OSW; 22	RIV; Wth	NHA; 33	STA; Wth	TMP			34th	148	
2020	Steven Sutcliffe	78	Ford	JEN; 31																		19th	198	
2020	Steven Sutcliffe	78	Chevy		WMM; 25	WMM; 25	JEN; 20	MND; 25	TMP; 16	NHA; 23	STA; 18	TMP; 15										19th	198	
2021	Steven Sutcliffe	78	Chevy	MAR; 26	STA; 28	RIV; 19	JEN; 15	OSW; 23	RIV; 12	NHA; 20	NRP; 15	STA; 23	BEE; 15	OSW; 19	RCH; 17	RIV; 19	STA					14th	321	
2022	Steven Sutcliffe	78	Chevy	NSM	RCH	RIV; 21	LEE; 17	JEN; 18	MND; 19	RIV; 22	WAL; 19	NHA; 17	CLM; 21	TMP; 13	LGY; 16	OSW; 20	RIV; 18	TMP; 19	MAR; 35			14th	342	
2023	Steven Sutcliffe	78	Chevy	NSM	RCH; 24	MON	RIV	LEE	SEE	RIV	WAL	NHA	LMP	THO	LGY	OSW	MON	RIV	NWS	THO	MAR	79th	20	
