= Tom Rogers Jr. =

American racing driver

- Nationality: American
- Born: June 16, 1978 (age 48) Patchogue, New York, U.S.

NASCAR Whelen Modified Tour career
- Debut season: 2004
- Years active: 2004–2006, 2010–2012, 2014–2019, 2021–2022, 2024
- Starts: 35
- Championships: 0
- Wins: 0
- Poles: 3
- Best finish: 27th in 2011
- Finished last season: 53rd (2024)
- Statistics up to date as of April 16, 2025.

Thomas Rogers Jr. (born June 16, 1978) is an American professional stock car racing driver who last competed part-time in the NASCAR Whelen Modified Tour, driving the No. 00 for Jody Lauzon. Rogers is a six-time champion and has the most career modified division titles at the Riverhead Raceway, his home track.

Rogers has also competed in the Tri-Track Open Modified Series.

== Motorsports results ==
=== NASCAR ===
(key) (Bold – Pole position awarded by qualifying time. Italics – Pole position earned by points standings or practice time. * – Most laps led.)

==== Whelen Modified Tour ====
NASCAR Whelen Modified Tour results
Year	Car owner	No.	Make	1	2	3	4	5	6	7	8	9	10	11	12	13	14	15	16	17	18	19	NWMTC	Pts	Ref
2004	N/A	6	Chevy	TMP	STA	WFD	NZH	STA	RIV; DNQ	LER	WAL	BEE	NHA	SEE	RIV; 22	STA	TMP	WFD	TMP	NHA	STA; DNQ	TMP	67th	195	
2005	N/A	6	Chevy	TMP	STA	RIV; DNQ	WFD	STA	JEN	NHA	BEE	SEE	RIV; DNQ	STA	TMP	WFD	MAR	TMP	NHA	STA	TMP		N/A	0	
2006	N/A	01	Chevy	TMP	STA	JEN	TMP	STA	NHA	HOL	**RIV**; 14	STA	TMP	MAR	TMP	NHA	WFD	TMP					51st	173	
2006	N/A	51	N/A																STA; DNQ				51st	173	
2010	Helmut Loschnig	5	Chevy	TMP	STA	STA	MAR	NHA	LIM	MND	RIV	STA	TMP	BRI	NHA	STA; 19	TMP; DNQ						43rd	164	
2011	Michael Berner	9	Chevy	TMP; 27	STA; 9	STA; 28	MND	TMP; 14	NHA	RIV	STA; 19	NHA	BRI	DEL	TMP; 6	LRP	NHA	STA; 17	TMP; 5				27th	948	
2012	Joe Ambrose	9	Chevy	TMP	STA	MND	STA	WFD	NHA	STA	TMP	BRI	TMP	RIV; 6	NHA	STA	TMP; 12						32nd	70	
2014	Joe Ambrose	0	Chevy	TMP	STA	STA	WFD	RIV; 8	NHA	MND	STA	TMP	BRI	NHA	STA	TMP							38th	36	
2015	Bill Darrow	63	Chevy	TMP; 14	STA; 31	WAT; 23	STA; 10	TMP															29th	185	
2015	Joe Ambrose	0	Chevy						**RIV**; 7	NHA	MON	STA	TMP	BRI	**RIV**; 6								29th	185	
2015	Linda Rodenbaugh	83	Chevy													NHA; 33	STA	TMP					29th	185	
2016	Linda Rodenbaugh	38	Chevy	TMP	STA; 32	WFD	STA	TMP	RIV	NHA	MND	STA	TMP	BRI									37th	52	
2016	Joe Ambrose	0	Chevy												RIV; 4	OSW	SEE	NHA	STA	TMP			37th	52	
2017	Joe Ambrose	0	Chevy	MYR	THO	STA	LGY	THO	RIV; 8	NHA	STA	THO	BRI	SEE	OSW	RIV	NHA	STA	THO				54th	36	
2018	Danny Watts Racing	82	Chevy	MYR	TMP	STA	SEE	TMP	LGY	RIV; 8	NHA	STA	TMP	BRI	OSW	RIV; 22	NHA	STA	TMP				45th	58	
2019	Sean Corsetti	9	Chevy	MYR	SBO	TMP	STA	WAL	SEE	TMP	RIV; 9	NHA	STA	TMP	OSW								38th	98	
2019	Danny Watts Racing	82	Chevy													RIV; 9*	NHA	STA					38th	98	
2019	Danny Watts Racing	80	Chevy																TMP; 18				38th	98	
2021	Kenny Darch	03	Chevy	MAR	STA	RIV; 24	JEN	OSW	RIV	NHA	NRP	STA	BEE	OSW	RCH	**RIV**; 8	STA						40th	57	
2022	Kenny Darch	03	Chevy	NSM	RCH	RIV; 20	LEE	JEN	MND	RIV	WAL; 25	NHA	CLM	TMP	LGY	OSW	RIV	TMP	MAR				54th	43	
2024	Jody Lauzon	00	Chevy	NSM	RCH	THO	MON	RIV; 21	SEE; 18	NHA	MON	LMP	THO	OSW	RIV	MON	THO	NWS	MAR				53rd	49	
