= Anthony Nocella =

American racing driver

- Born: November 10, 1992 (age 33) Woburn, Massachusetts, U.S.

NASCAR Whelen Modified Tour career
- Debut season: 2015
- Current team: Michiele Davini
- Years active: 2015–present
- Car number: 17
- Crew chief: Chris McTaggart
- Starts: 83
- Championships: 0
- Wins: 1
- Poles: 1
- Best finish: 10th in 2020, 2021
- Finished last season: 28th (2026)
- Statistics up to date as of October 12, 2026.

Anthony Nocella (born November 20, 1992) is an American professional stock car racing driver who competes part-time in the NASCAR Whelen Modified Tour, driving the No. 17 for Michele Davini. He is a driver known for his prowess in a variety of different cars, including NEMA Midgets and Supermodifieds.

Nocella has previously competed in series such as the Modified Racing Series (where he won the 2017 series championship), the Tri-Track Open Modified Series, the Chili Bowl Nationals, the Little 500 at the Anderson Speedway, and the World Series of Asphalt Stock Car Racing.

== Motorsports results ==
=== NASCAR ===
(key) (Bold – Pole position awarded by qualifying time. Italics – Pole position earned by points standings or practice time. * – Most laps led.)

==== Whelen Modified Tour ====
NASCAR Whelen Modified Tour results
Year	Car owner	No.	Make	1	2	3	4	5	6	7	8	9	10	11	12	13	14	15	16	17	18	NWMTC	Pts	Ref
2015	Mike Murphy	64	Chevy	TMP; 26	STA; 26	WAT; 31	STA; 24	TMP; 26	RIV; DNQ	NHA; 26	MON; 26	STA	TMP	BRI; 10	RIV	NHA; 34	STA; 13	TMP; 14				24th	240	
2016	Robert Katon Jr.	13	Chevy	TMP	STA	WFD	STA	TMP	RIV	NHA	MND	STA	TMP	BRI	RIV	OSW	SEE; 22	NHA	STA	TMP		53rd	22	
2017	Anthony Nocella	92	Chevy	MYR	THO	STA; 27	LGY	THO	RIV	NHA	STA	THO	BRI	SEE; 2	OSW	RIV	NHA; 10	STA; 11	THO; 32			32nd	149	
2018	Anthony Nocella	92	Chevy	MYR	TMP	STA	SEE; 20	TMP	LGY	RIV	NHA; 15	STA	TMP	BRI	OSW	RIV	NHA; 12	STA; 13	TMP; 11			34th	149	
2019	Anthony Nocella	92	Chevy	MYR; 6	SBO; 14	TMP; 24	STA; 27	WAL	SEE; 7	TMP; 28	RIV	NHA; 30	STA	TMP	OSW	RIV	NHA; 27	STA; 27	TMP; 35			26th	215	
2020	Anthony Nocella	92	Chevy	JEN	WMM; 14																	10th	282	
2020	Danny Watts Jr.	82	Chevy			WMM; 8	JEN; 3	MND; 4	TMP; 8	NHA; 4	STA; 17	TMP; 12										10th	282	
2021	Danny Watts Jr.	82	Chevy	MAR; 23	STA; 18	RIV; 14	JEN; 12	OSW; 9	RIV; 5	NHA; 16	NRP; 18	STA; 11	BEE; 6	OSW; 5	RCH; 11	RIV	**STA**; 6*					10th	422	
2022	Anthony Nocella	92	Chevy	NSM	RCH; 28	RIV	LEE	JEN	MND	RIV	WAL	NHA; 1	CLM; 19	TMP	LGY	OSW	RIV	TMP; 3	MAR; 5			25th	168	
2023	Anthony Nocella	92	Chevy	NSM; 9	RCH	MON; 27	RIV; 16	LEE; 21	SEE; 10	RIV							MON; 6	RIV	NWS; 19	THO; 6	MAR	12th	391	
2023	Russell Goodale	46	Chevy								WAL; 12	NHA; 16	LMP; 13	THO; 17	LGY; 10	OSW						12th	391	
2024	Anthony Nocella	92	Chevy	NSM	RCH	THO	MON; 9	RIV	SEE													24th	149	
2024	Michele Davini	17	Chevy							NHA; 14	MON	LMP	THO	OSW	RIV	MON; 2	THO; 2	NWS	MAR			24th	149	
2025	Michele Davini	17	Chevy	NSM	THO; Wth	NWS	SEE	RIV	WMM; 17	LMP	MON; 10	MON; 4	THO	RCH	OSW	NHA; 7	RIV	THO; 11	MAR			21st	171	
2026	Michele Davini	17	Chevy	NSM	MAR	THO	SEE	RIV	OXF; 15	SEE	CLM	WMM; Wth	MON; 13	THO	NHA; 26	STA	OSW	RIV	THO; 16			28th	106	
