= Gary Byington =

American racing driver

- Nationality: American
- Born: November 18, 1957 (age 68) Unionville, Connecticut, U.S.

NASCAR Whelen Modified Tour career
- Debut season: 2016
- Years active: 2016–2017, 2020–2021
- Starts: 13
- Championships: 0
- Wins: 0
- Poles: 0
- Best finish: 28th in 2020
- Statistics up to date as of May 19, 2025.

Gary Byington (born November 18, 1957) is an American former professional stock car racing driver who competed in the NASCAR Whelen Modified Tour from 2016 to 2021.

Byington has previously competed in the Modified Racing Series and the EXIT Realty Modified Touring Series.

== Motorsports results ==
=== NASCAR ===
(key) (Bold – Pole position awarded by qualifying time. Italics – Pole position earned by points standings or practice time. * – Most laps led.)

==== Whelen Modified Tour ====
NASCAR Whelen Modified Tour results
Year	Car owner	No.	Make	1	2	3	4	5	6	7	8	9	10	11	12	13	14	15	16	17	NWMTC	Pts	Ref
2016	Wade Cole	38	Chevy	TMP	STA	WFD	STA	TMP	RIV	NHA	MND	STA	TMP	BRI	RIV	OSW	SEE; 23				32nd	64	
2016	Linda Rodenbaugh	38	Chevy															NHA; 21	STA	TMP; 24	32nd	64	
2017	Linda Rodenbaugh	38	Chevy	MYR	THO; 30	STA; 28	LGY	THO; Wth	RIV	NHA	STA	THO	BRI	SEE	OSW	RIV	NHA	STA	THO		57th	30	
2020	Gary Byington	30	Chevy	JEN	WMM; 30	WMM; 28	JEN	MND; 23	TMP; 27	NHA; Wth	STA; 20	TMP; 18									28th	118	
2021	Gary Byington	30	Chevy	MAR; 22	STA; 27	RIV	JEN; Wth	OSW	RIV	NHA	NRP	STA; Wth	BEE	OSW	RCH	RIV	STA				48th	39	
