= J. R. Bertuccio =

American racing driver

- Nationality: American
- Born: May 12, 1981 (age 45) Centereach, New York, U.S.

NASCAR Whelen Modified Tour career
- Debut season: 1997
- Years active: 1997–2004, 2006–2008, 2014, 2016, 2019–2024
- Starts: 47
- Championships: 0
- Wins: 0
- Poles: 0
- Best finish: 31st in 2024
- Finished last season: 31st (2024)
- Statistics up to date as of April 16, 2025.

J. R. Bertuccio (born May 12, 1981) is an American professional stock car racing driver who last competed part-time in the NASCAR Whelen Modified Tour, driving the No. 2 for Joe Bertuccio. He was the 2003 champion in the modified division at his home track of Riverhead Raceway.

Bertuccio has also competed in series such as the now defunct NASCAR Whelen Southern Modified Tour, the SMART Modified Tour, the Southern Modified Racing Series, the ASA Southern Modified Race Tour, and the World Series of Asphalt Stock Car Racing.

== Motorsports results ==
=== NASCAR ===
(key) (Bold – Pole position awarded by qualifying time. Italics – Pole position earned by points standings or practice time. * – Most laps led.)

==== Whelen Modified Tour ====
NASCAR Whelen Modified Tour results
| Year | Car owner | No. | Make | 1 | 2 | 3 | 4 | 5 | 6 | 7 | 8 | 9 | 10 | 11 | 12 | 13 | 14 | 15 | 16 | 17 | 18 | 19 | 20 | 21 | 22 | 23 | NWMTC | Pts | Ref |
|---|---|---|---|---|---|---|---|---|---|---|---|---|---|---|---|---|---|---|---|---|---|---|---|---|---|---|---|---|---|
| 1997 | N/A | N/A | Chevy | TMP | MAR | STA | NZH | STA | NHA | FLE | JEN | RIV | GLN | NHA | RPS | HOL | TMP | RIV | NHA | GLN | STA | NHA | STA | FLE | TMP; 22 | RCH | N/A | 0 | |
| 1998 | N/A | 02 | Chevy | RPS | TMP | MAR | STA | NZH | STA | GLN | JEN | RIV; 12 | NHA | NHA | LEE | HOL | TMP | NHA | RIV; 24 | STA | NHA | TMP | STA | TMP | FLE | | N/A | 0 | |
| 1999 | Teri Bertuccio | 02 | Chevy | TMP; 26 | RPS; DNQ | STA | RCH | STA; 22 | RIV; 14 | JEN | NHA | NZH | HOL | TMP; 30 | NHA | RIV; 21 | GLN | STA; 30 | RPS | TMP; 11 | NHA; 19 | STA; 34 | MAR; DNQ | TMP; 26 | | | 33rd | 817 | |
| 2000 | Teri Bertuccio | 02 | Chevy | STA | RCH; DNQ | STA; DNQ | RIV; 12 | SEE | NHA | NZH | TMP | RIV; 27 | GLN | TMP | STA | WFD | NHA | STA; DNQ | MAR | TMP; DNQ | | | | | | | 58th | 290 | |
| 2001 | Teri Bertuccio | 02 | Chevy | SBO | TMP | STA | WFD | NZH | STA | RIV; 26 | SEE | RCH | NHA; 29 | HOL | RIV; 26 | CHE | TMP | STA | WFD | TMP | STA; DNQ | MAR | TMP; 17 | | | | 46th | 383 | |
| 2002 | N/A | 2 | Chevy | TMP; 32 | STA | WFD | NZH | RIV; 14 | SEE | RCH | STA | BEE | NHA | RIV; 26 | TMP | STA | WFD | TMP | NHA | STA; DNQ | MAR; 17 | TMP; 18 | | | | | 45th | 555 | |
| 2003 | N/A | 2 | Chevy | TMP | STA | WFD | NZH | STA | LER | BLL; DNQ | BEE | NHA | ADI | RIV; 25 | TMP | STA | WFD | TMP | NHA | STA | TMP | | | | | | 62nd | 149 | |
| 2004 | N/A | 2 | Chevy | TMP | STA | WFD | NZH | STA | RIV; DNQ | LER | WAL | BEE | NHA | SEE | RIV | STA | TMP | WFD | TMP | NHA | STA | TMP | | | | | N/A | 0 | |
| 2006 | Joe Bertuccio | 27 | Chevy | TMP | STA | JEN | TMP | STA | NHA | HOL | RIV; 28 | STA | TMP | MAR | TMP | NHA | WFD | TMP | STA | | | | | | | | 65th | 79 | |
| 2007 | N/A | 02 | Chevy | TMP | STA | WTO | STA | TMP | NHA | TSA | RIV; 18 | STA | TMP | MAN | MAR | NHA | TMP | STA | TMP | | | | | | | | 59th | 109 | |
| 2008 | N/A | 74 | Dodge | TMP; 36 | STA | STA | TMP | NHA | SPE | RIV | STA | TMP | MAN | TMP | NHA | MAR | CHE | STA | TMP | | | | | | | | 70th | 55 | |
| 2014 | Joe Bertuccio | 21 | Chevy | TMP | STA | STA | WFD | RIV | NHA; 24 | MND | STA | TMP | BRI | NHA | STA | TMP | | | | | | | | | | | 47th | 20 | |
| 2016 | Joe Bertuccio | 21 | Chevy | TMP | STA | WFD | STA | TMP | RIV | NHA; 17 | MND | STA | TMP | BRI | RIV | OSW | SEE | NHA | STA | TMP | | | | | | | 48th | 27 | |
| 2019 | Stash Butova | 12 | Chevy | MYR | SBO | TMP | STA | WAL | SEE | TMP | RIV | NHA | STA | TMP | OSW | RIV; 8 | NHA; 34 | STA; Wth | TMP; 28 | | | | | | | | 48th | 62 | |
| 2020 | Joe Bertuccio | 2 | Chevy | JEN; 20 | WMM; 21 | WMM; 26 | JEN; Wth | MND | TMP | NHA | STA | TMP | | | | | | | | | | | | | | | 32nd | 65 | |
| 2021 | Joe Bertuccio | 21 | Chevy | MAR | STA | RIV | JEN | OSW | RIV; 22 | NHA | NRP | STA | | | | | | | | | | | | | | | 63rd | 22 | |
| 2021 | Joe Bertuccio | 2 | Chevy | | | | | | | | | | BEE; Wth | OSW | RCH | RIV | STA | | | | | | | | | | 63rd | 22 | |
| 2022 | Joe Bertuccio | 2 | Chevy | NSM; 18 | RCH | RIV; 23 | LEE | JEN | MND | RIV | WAL | NHA | CLM | TMP | LGY; 19 | OSW | RIV | TMP | MAR | | | | | | | | 49th | 72 | |
| 2023 | Joe Bertuccio | 2 | Chevy | NSM; 30 | RCH | MON | RIV | LEE | SEE | RIV; 23 | WAL | NHA | LMP | THO | LGY | OSW | MON | RIV; 5 | NWS | THO; 25 | MAR | | | | | | 35th | 108 | |
| 2024 | Joe Bertuccio | 2 | Chevy | NSM; 32 | RCH | THO; 18 | MON | RIV; 5 | SEE | NHA | MON | LMP | THO | OSW | RIV; 8 | MON | THO | NWS | MAR | | | | | | | | 31st | 113 | |

==== Whelen Southern Modified Tour ====
NASCAR Whelen Southern Modified Tour results
| Year | Car owner | No. | Make | 1 | 2 | 3 | 4 | 5 | 6 | 7 | 8 | 9 | 10 | 11 | 12 | 13 | 14 | NSWMTC | Pts | Ref |
|---|---|---|---|---|---|---|---|---|---|---|---|---|---|---|---|---|---|---|---|---|
| 2005 | N/A | 2 | Chevy | CRW; 15 | CRW | CRW | CRW | BGS | MAR | ACE | ACE | CRW | CRW | SNM | ACE | | | 27th | 118 | |
| 2007 | J. R. Bertuccio | 21 | Chevy | CRW; 26 | FAI | GRE | CRW | CRW | BGS | MAR | ACE | CRW | SNM | CRW | CRW | | | 45th | 85 | |
| 2008 | J. R. Bertuccio | 74 | Chevy | CRW; 20 | ACE | CRW | BGS | CRW | LAN | CRW | SNM | MAR | CRW | CRW | | | | 40th | 103 | |
| 2009 | Joseph Bertuccio | 2 | Chevy | CON; 11 | SBO; 6 | | LAN; 8 | CRW; 11 | BGS | BRI | CRW | MBS | CRW | CRW; 10 | | ACE; 15 | CRW | 13th | 1075 | |
| 2009 | Joseph Bertuccio | 2 | Dodge | | | CRW; 6 | | | | | | | | | | | | 13th | 1075 | |
| 2009 | Joseph Bertuccio | 22 | Chevy | | | | | | | | | | | | MAR; 14 | | | 13th | 1075 | |
| 2012 | Joseph Bertuccio | 2 | Chevy | CRW; 11 | CRW; 19 | SBO; 18 | CRW | CRW | BGS | BRI | LGY | THO | CRW | CLT | | | | 26th | 84 | |
| 2013 | Joseph Bertuccio | 2 | Chevy | CRW; 14 | SNM; 15 | SBO; 15 | CRW; 11 | CRW; 9 | BGS; 16 | | LGY; 13 | CRW; 5 | CRW; 4 | SNM; 7 | CLT; 14 | | | 10th | 392 | |
| 2013 | Joseph Bertuccio | 21 | Chevy | | | | | | | BRI; 12 | | | | | | | | 10th | 392 | |
| 2014 | Joseph Bertuccio | 2 | Chevy | CRW; 3 | SNM; 1* | SBO; 5 | LGY; 12 | CRW; 3 | BGS; 14 | | LGY; 4 | CRW; 7 | SBO; 5 | SNM; 6 | CRW; 3 | CRW; 7 | CLT; 2 | 4th | 552 | |
| 2014 | Joseph Bertuccio | 21 | Chevy | | | | | | | BRI; 1 | | | | | | | | 4th | 552 | |
| 2015 | Joseph Bertuccio | 2 | Chevy | CRW; 10 | CRW; 4 | SBO; 2 | LGY; 7 | CRW; 10 | BGS; 9 | | | | | | | | | 12th | 257 | |
| 2015 | Joseph Bertuccio | 21 | Chevy | | | | | | | BRI; 12 | LGY | SBO | CLT | | | | | 12th | 257 | |
| 2016 | Joseph Bertuccio | 2 | Chevy | CRW; 13 | CON; 7 | SBO | CRW; 7 | **CRW**; 2* | BGS; 12 | | | | | | | | | 14th | 230 | |
| 2016 | Joseph Bertuccio | 21S | Chevy | | | | | | | BRI; 13 | ECA | SBO | CRW | CLT | | | | 14th | 230 | |

=== SMART Modified Tour ===
SMART Modified Tour results
| Year | Car owner | No. | Make | 1 | 2 | 3 | 4 | 5 | 6 | 7 | 8 | 9 | 10 | 11 | 12 | 13 | SMTC | Pts | Ref |
|---|---|---|---|---|---|---|---|---|---|---|---|---|---|---|---|---|---|---|---|
| 2021 | Joe Bertuccio | 21 | N/A | CRW | FLO | SBO; 8 | FCS | CRW | DIL | CAR | CRW | DOM | PUL | HCY | ACE | | 37th | 24 | |
| 2026 | Joe Bertuccio | 2 | N/A | FLO | AND | SBO | DOM | HCY | WKS | FCR | CRW | PUL | CAR | ROU | TRI | NWS; 18 | 54th | 23 | |
