= Kyle Ebersole =

American racing driver

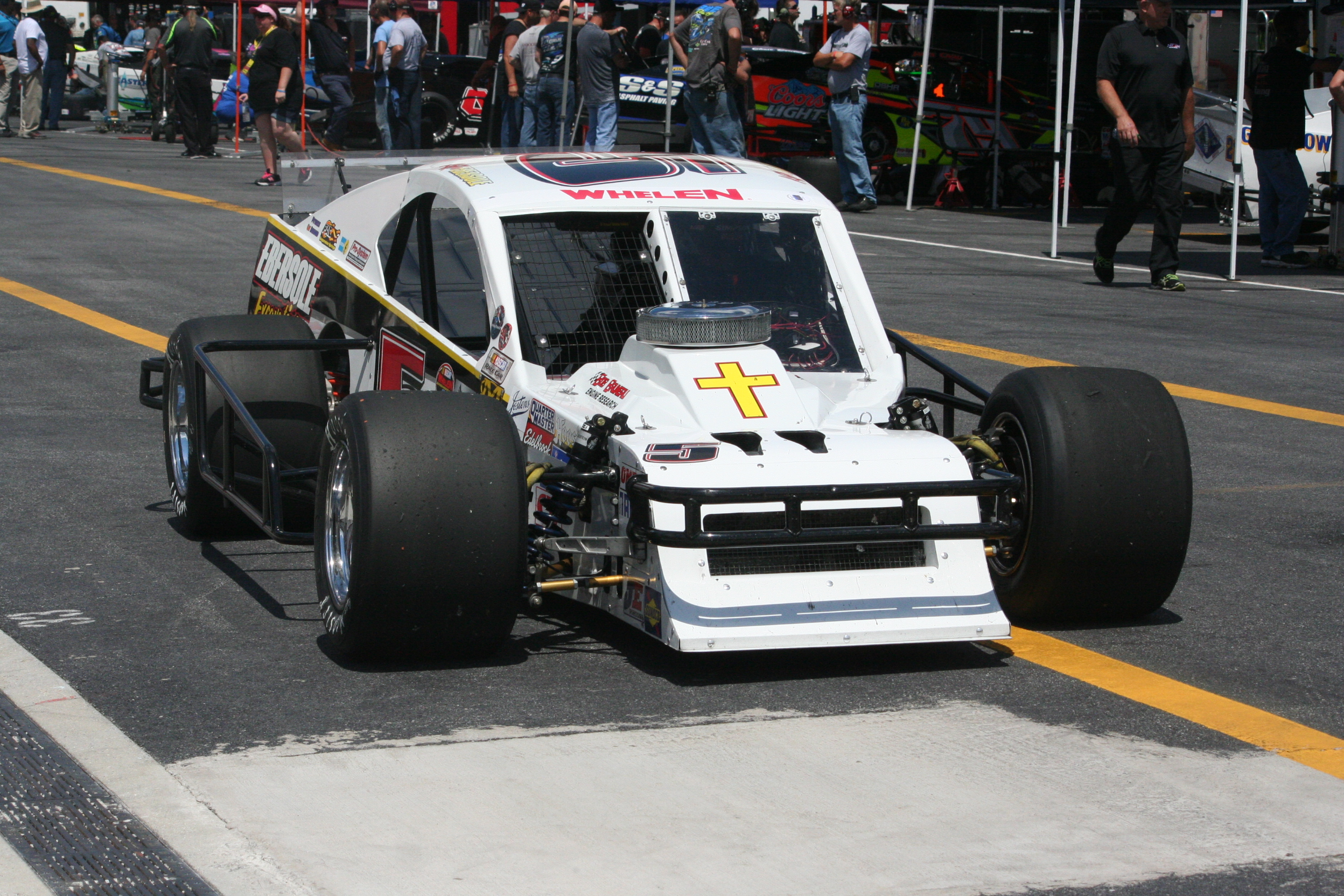
- Ebersole's No. 5 car at Bristol Motor Speedway in 2016
- Nationality: American
- Born: October 25, 1990 (age 36) Hummelstown, Pennsylvania, U.S.

NASCAR Whelen Modified Tour career
- Debut season: 2013
- Current team: Bob Ebersole
- Years active: 2013, 2017–2025
- Car number: 5
- Crew chief: Bob Ebersole
- Starts: 36
- Championships: 0
- Wins: 0
- Poles: 0
- Best finish: 22nd in 2023
- Finished last season: 35th (2025)
- Statistics up to date as of October 24, 2025.

Kyle Ebersole (born October 25, 1990) is an American professional stock car racing driver who last competed part-time in the NASCAR Whelen Modified Tour, driving the No. 5 for Bob Ebersole.

Ebersole has also competed in series such as the now defunct NASCAR Whelen Southern Modified Tour, the SMART Modified Tour, the Race of Champions Asphalt Modified Tour, the Southern Modified Racing Series, and the World Series of Asphalt Stock Car Racing.

== Motorsports results ==
=== NASCAR ===
(key) (Bold – Pole position awarded by qualifying time. Italics – Pole position earned by points standings or practice time. * – Most laps led.)

==== Whelen Modified Tour ====
NASCAR Whelen Modified Tour results
Year	Car owner	No.	Make	1	2	3	4	5	6	7	8	9	10	11	12	13	14	15	16	17	18	NWMTC	Pts	Ref
2013	Bob Ebersole	5	Ford	TMP	STA	STA	WFD	RIV	NHA; 29	MND	STA	TMP	BRI	RIV	NHA	STA	TMP					48th	15	
2017	Bob Ebersole	5	Chevy	MYR	THO	STA	LGY; 9	THO	RIV	NHA; 14	STA	THO	BRI; 11	SEE	OSW; 20	RIV	NHA	STA	THO			35th	122	
2018	Bob Ebersole	5	Chevy	MYR	TMP	STA	SEE	TMP	LGY; 12	RIV	NHA	STA	TMP	BRI	OSW; 17	RIV	NHA	STA	TMP			44th	59	
2019	Bob Ebersole	5	Chevy	MYR; 14	SBO; 31	TMP	STA	WAL	SEE	TMP	RIV	NHA	STA	TMP	OSW; 18	RIV	NHA	STA	TMP			46th	70	
2020	Bob Ebersole	5	Chevy	JEN	WMM	WMM	JEN; 9	MND	TMP	NHA	STA	TMP										41st	35	
2021	Bob Ebersole	5	Ford	MAR; 24	STA	RIV	JEN; 21	OSW; 5	RIV	NHA	NRP	STA	BEE; 9	OSW; 10	RCH; 18	RIV	STA					23rd	177	
2022	Bob Ebersole	5	Ford	NSM; 26	RCH; 4	RIV	LEE	JEN; 17	MND	RIV	WAL	NHA; 25	CLM	TMP	LGY; 7	OSW; 16	RIV	TMP	MAR			24th	169	
2023	Bob Ebersole	5	Ford	NSM; 12	RCH; 12	MON; 21	RIV	LEE	SEE	RIV	WAL	NHA	LMP; 10	THO	LGY; 5	OSW	MON	RIV	NWS; 8	THO	MAR; 36	22nd	204	
2024	Bob Ebersole	5	Ford	NSM	RCH	THO	MON; 19	RIV	SEE; 17	NHA	MON; 16	LMP	THO	OSW	RIV	MON	THO	NWS	MAR			44th	80	
2025	Bob Ebersole	5	Ford	NSM	THO	NWS; 25	SEE; 9	RIV	WMM	LMP	MON; 18	MON; 15	THO	RCH	OSW	NHA	RIV	THO	MAR			35th	109	

==== Whelen Southern Modified Tour ====
NASCAR Whelen Southern Modified Tour results
Year	Car owner	No.	Make	1	2	3	4	5	6	7	8	9	10	11	12	13	14	NSWMTC	Pts	Ref
2012	Bob Ebersole	51	Ford	CRW; 24								THO; 19						6th	381	
2012	Bob Ebersole	51	Chevy		CRW; 12	SBO; 4	CRW; 4	CRW; 13	BGS; 6	BRI; 6	LGY; 6		CRW; 3	CLT; 6				6th	381	
2013	Bob Ebersole	5	Ford	CRW; 3	SNM; 7	SBO; 3	CRW; 3	CRW; 2	BGS; 11	BRI; 3	LGY; 1	CRW; 6	CRW; 12	SNM; 4	CLT; 2			2nd	475	
2014	Bob Ebersole	5	Ford	CRW; 14	SNM; 2	SBO; 10	LGY; DNQ	CRW; 5	BGS; 6	BRI; 15	LGY; 6	CRW; 3	SBO; 1	SNM; 3	CRW; 11	CRW; 3	CLT; 4	6th	520	
2015	Bob Ebersole	5	Ford	CRW; 13	CRW; 7	SBO; 6	LGY; 2	CRW; 4	BGS; 8	BRI; 9	LGY; 2	SBO; 8	CLT; 12					5th	371	
2016	Bob Ebersole	5	Ford	CRW; 16	CON; 16	SBO; 7	CRW; 8	CRW; Wth	BGS; 10*			SBO; 7	CRW	CLT; 12				9th	310	
2016	Bob Ebersole	5S	Ford							BRI; 1	ECA							9th	310	

=== SMART Modified Tour ===
SMART Modified Tour results
Year	Car owner	No.	Make	1	2	3	4	5	6	7	8	9	10	11	12	13	SMTC	Pts	Ref
2022	N/A	5E	N/A	FLO	SNM	CRW	SBO; 23	FCS	CRW	NWS	NWS	CAR	DOM	HCY	TRI	PUL	53rd	9	
2026	Robert Ebersole	5PA	N/A	FLO	AND	SBO	DOM	HCY; 20	WKS	FCR; 15	CRW	PUL	CAR	ROU	TRI	NWS	44th	47	
