= Jeff Goodale =

American racing driver

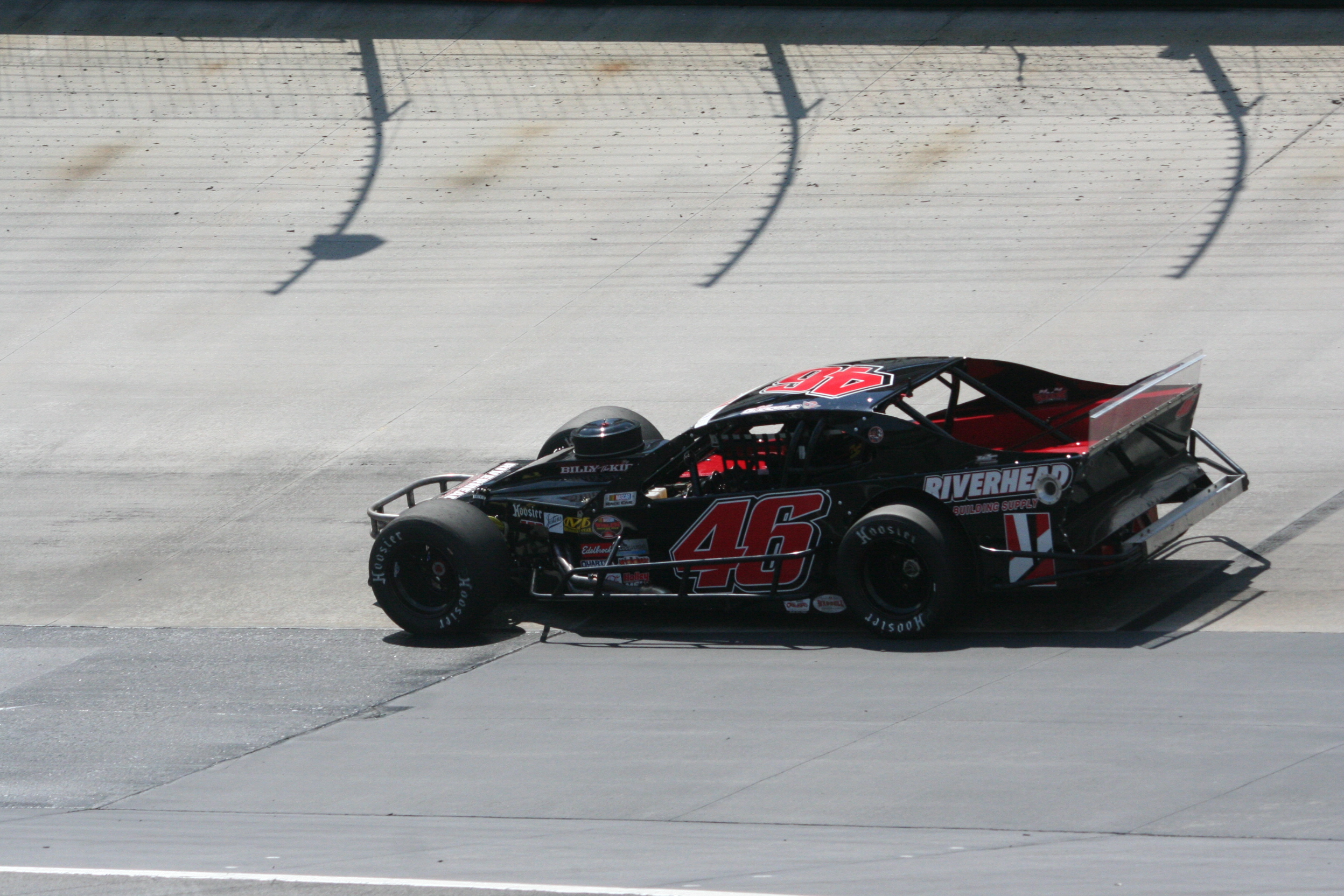
- Goodale's No. 46 car at Bristol Motor Speedway in 2016
- Nationality: American
- Born: August 19, 1993 (age 33) Riverhead, New York, U.S.

NASCAR Whelen Modified Tour career
- Years active: 2015–2016
- Starts: 31
- Championships: 0
- Wins: 0
- Poles: 0
- Best finish: 13th in 2016
- Statistics up to date as of August 11, 2024.

Jeffrey Goodale (born August 19, 1993) is an American professional stock car racing driver who competed in the NASCAR Whelen Modified Tour from 2015 to 2016. He is the first cousin of Eric Goodale and Kevin Goodale, who have both competed in the Modified Tour.

Goodale has cystic fibrosis.

Goodale has also competed in the now defunct NASCAR Whelen Southern Modified Tour, and the World Series of Asphalt Stock Car Racing Series.

== Motorsports results ==
=== NASCAR ===
(key) (Bold – Pole position awarded by qualifying time. Italics – Pole position earned by points standings or practice time. * – Most laps led.)

==== Whelen Modified Tour ====
NASCAR Whelen Modified Tour results
Year	Car owner	No.	Make	1	2	3	4	5	6	7	8	9	10	11	12	13	14	15	16	17	NWMTC	Pts	Ref
2015	Russell Goodale	46	Chevy	TMP; 22	STA; 23	WAT; 15	STA; 18	TMP; 21	RIV; DNQ	NHA; 32	MON; 23	STA; 12	TMP; 22	BRI; 6	RIV; 10	NHA; 7	STA; 23	TMP; 11			15th	386	
2016	Russell Goodale	46	Chevy	TMP; 24	STA; 28	WFD; 4	STA; 12	TMP; 5	RIV; 17	NHA; 28	MND; 21	STA; 12	TMP; 10	BRI; 9	RIV; 19	OSW; 14	SEE; 10	NHA; 12	STA; 12	TMP; 12	13th	499	

==== Whelen Southern Modified Tour ====
NASCAR Whelen Southern Modified Tour results
Year	Car owner	No.	Make	1	2	3	4	5	6	7	8	9	10	11	NWSMTC	Pts	Ref
2016	Russ Goodale	46	Chevy	CRW; 8	CON	SBO	CRW	CRW	BGS	BRI	ECA	SBO	CRW	CLT	24th	36	
