= Max Zachem =

American racing driver (born 1992)

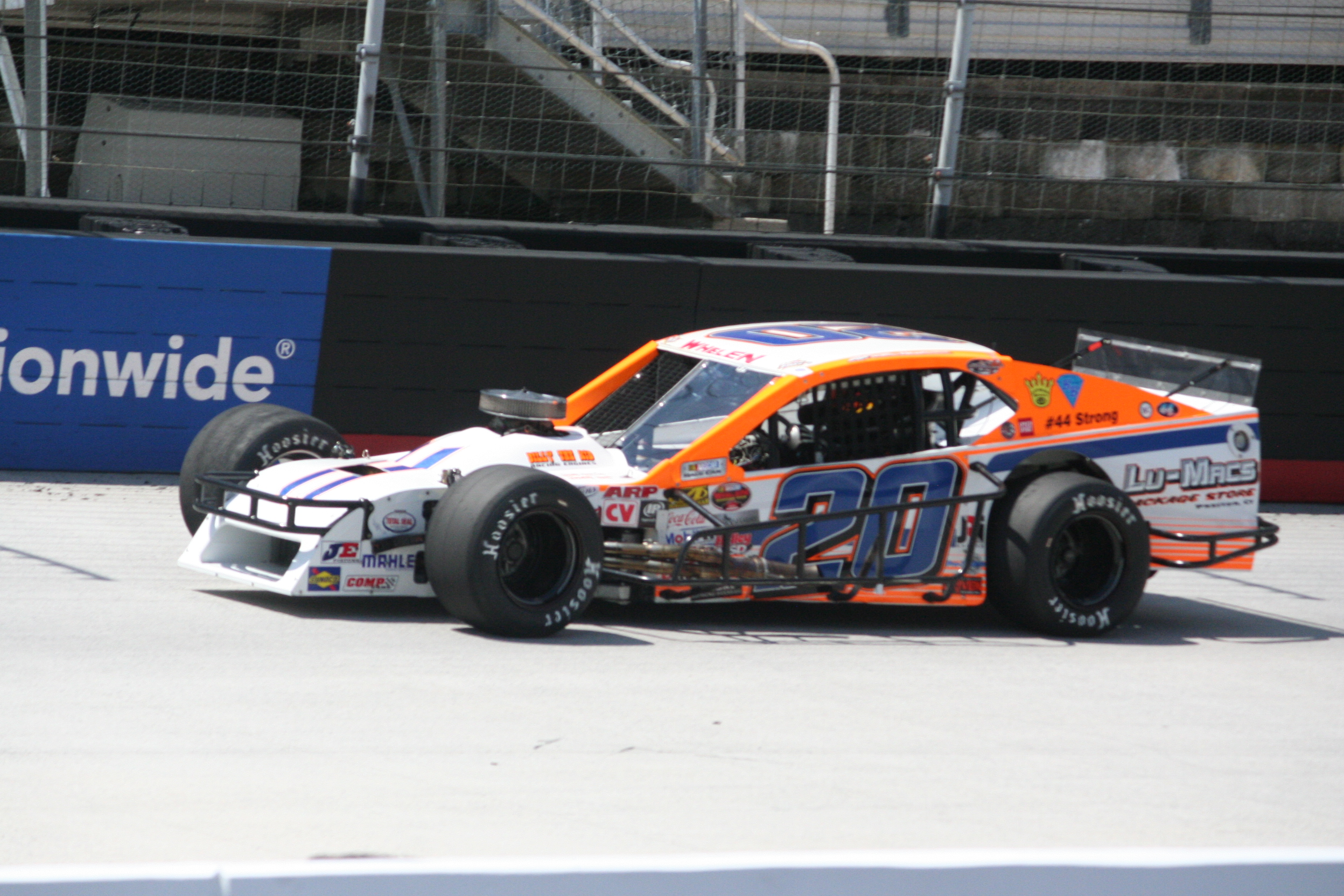
- Zachem's No. 20 car at Bristol Motor Speedway in 2016
- Nationality: American
- Born: November 22, 1992 (age 33) Preston, Connecticut, U.S.

NASCAR Whelen Modified Tour career
- Debut season: 2013
- Current team: John Morgan
- Years active: 2013–2019, 2021, 2023, 2025–present
- Car number: 20
- Crew chief: Ryan Morgan
- Starts: 73
- Championships: 0
- Wins: 0
- Poles: 0
- Best finish: 5th in 2016
- Finished last season: 25th (2026)
- Statistics up to date as of October 12, 2026.

Max Zachem (born November 22, 1992) is an American professional stock car racing driver who competes part-time in the NASCAR Whelen Modified Tour, driving the No. 20 for John Morgan.

Zachem has previously competed in series such as the SMART Modified Tour, the Tri-Track Open Modified Series, the Modified Racing Series, and the World Series of Asphalt Stock Car Racing.

== Motorsports results ==
=== NASCAR ===
(key) (Bold – Pole position awarded by qualifying time. Italics – Pole position earned by points standings or practice time. * – Most laps led.)

==== Whelen Modified Tour ====
NASCAR Whelen Modified Tour results
Year	Car owner	No.	Make	1	2	3	4	5	6	7	8	9	10	11	12	13	14	15	16	17	18	NWMTC	Pts	Ref
2013	Mike Smeriglio III	20	Ford	TMP	STA	STA	WFD	RIV	NHA	MND	STA	TMP	BRI	RIV	NHA	STA	TMP; 6					40th	38	
2014	Boehler Racing Enterprises	3	Chevy	TMP	STA	STA	WFD	RIV	NHA	MND	STA	TMP	BRI	NHA	STA; 22							33rd	57	
2014	Michael Grimaldi	20	Chevy													TMP; 9						33rd	57	
2015	Ken Zachem	14	Chevy	TMP; 31	STA; 21	WAT; 4	STA; 19	TMP; 16	RIV; 14	NHA; 14	MON; 13	STA; 13	TMP; 17	BRI; 12	RIV; 12	NHA; 30	STA; 11	TMP; 15				12th	418	
2016	Ken Zachem	20	Chevy	TMP; 12	STA; 10	WFD; 2	STA; 10	TMP; 2*	RIV; 6	NHA; 32	MND; 7	STA; 7	TMP; 6	BRI; 12	RIV; 8	OSW; 20	SEE; 13	NHA; 8	STA; 7	TMP; 13		5th	576	
2017	Ken Zachem	20	Chevy	MYR; 5	TMP; 3	STA; 21	LGY; 4	TMP; 10	RIV; 10	NHA; 8	STA; 19	TMP; 15	BRI	SEE; 8	OSW; 8	RIV	NHA	STA; Wth	TMP			14th	373	
2018	Ken Zachem	20	Chevy	MYR	TMP; 36	STA	SEE	TMP; Wth	LGY	RIV	NHA; 29	STA	TMP	BRI	OSW	RIV	NHA	STA; 27	TMP; Wth			52nd	40	
2019	Bruce Bachta	20	Chevy	MYR	SBO	TMP	STA; 4	WAL	SEE; 13	TMP; 9	RIV	NHA; 25	STA; Wth	TMP; Wth	OSW	RIV	NHA	STA	TMP			35th	125	
2021	Sean McDonald	26	Chevy	MAR	STA	RIV	JEN	OSW	RIV	NHA; 29	NRP	STA	BEE	OSW	RCH	RIV	STA					66th	15	
2023	Sean McDonald	26	Chevy	NSM	RCH	MON	RIV	LEE; 19	SEE; 18	RIV; 16	WAL; 20	NHA; 29	LMP	THO; 13	LGY	OSW	MON	RIV	NWS	THO; 18	MAR	24th	199	
2025	Kenneth Zachem	20	Chevy	NSM; 16	THO; 22	NWS; Wth	SEE; 16	RIV	WMM	LMP	MON; 16	MON; 20	THO; 15	RCH	OSW	NHA	RIV	THO; 25	MAR			20th	178	
2026	John Morgan	20	N/A	NSM; 16	MAR	THO; 24	SEE	RIV	OXF	SEE	CLM; 6	WMM	MON	THO; 23	NHA	STA; 16	OSW	RIV	THO			25th	136	

=== SMART Modified Tour ===
SMART Modified Tour results
Year	Car owner	No.	Make	1	2	3	4	5	6	7	8	9	10	11	12	13	SMTC	Pts	Ref
2021	N/A	18C	N/A	CRW	FLO	SBO	FCS	CRW	DIL	CAR	CRW	DOM	PUL; 11*	HCY	ACE		41st	20	
2022	N/A	20	N/A	FLO	SNM	CRW	SBO	FCS	CRW	NWS; 10	NWS; 7	CAR	DOM	HCY	TRI	PUL	N/A	0	
