= Eric Goodale =

American racing driver

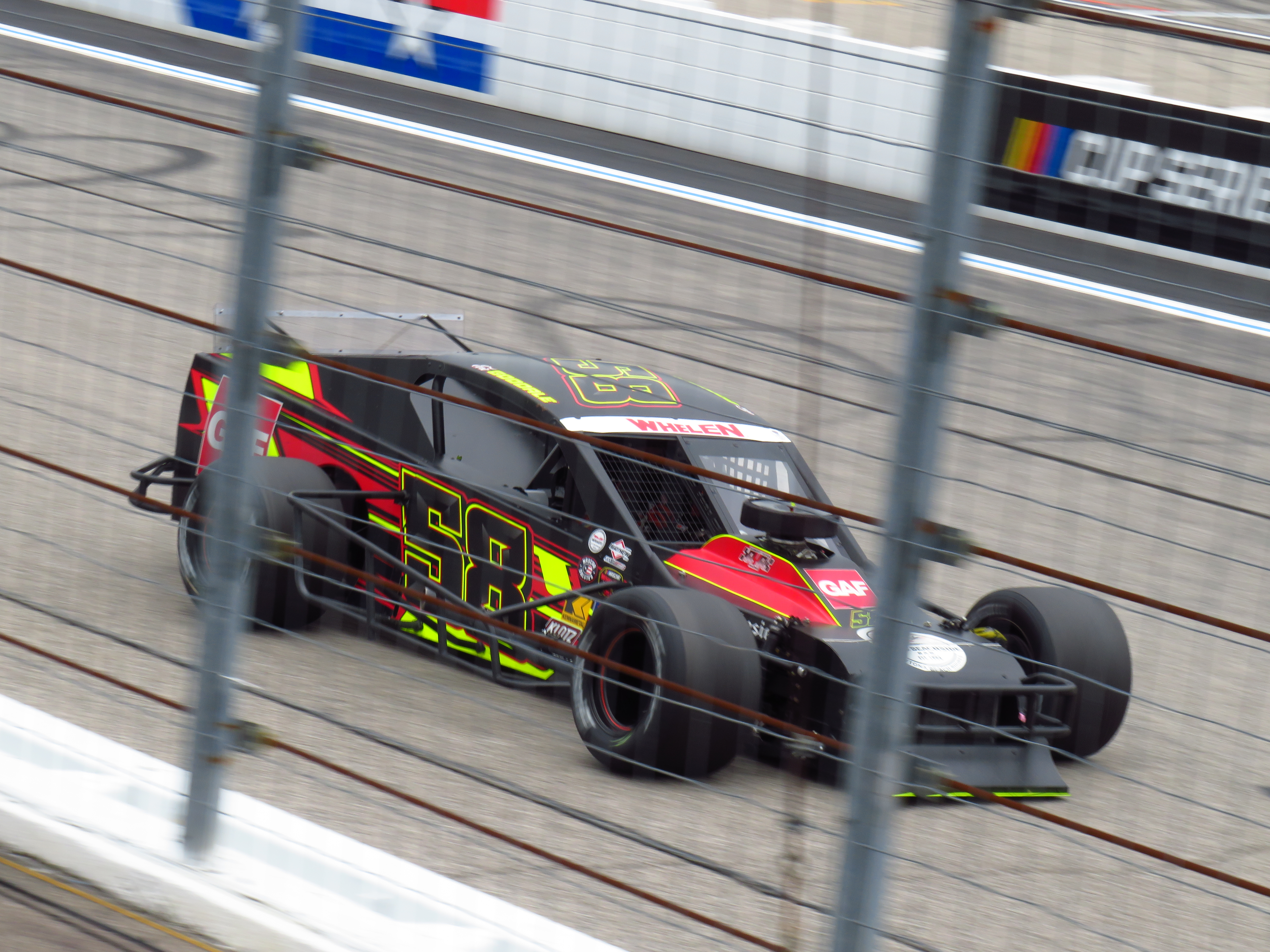
- Goodale's No. 58 car at New Hampshire Motor Speedway in 2024
- Nationality: American
- Born: November 9, 1985 (age 40) Riverhead, New York, U.S.

NASCAR Whelen Modified Tour career
- Debut season: 2008
- Current team: Goodie Racing
- Years active: 2008–present
- Car number: 58
- Crew chief: Rob Hyer
- Starts: 250
- Championships: 0
- Wins: 5
- Poles: 3
- Best finish: 3rd in 2022
- Finished last season: 7th (2026)
- Statistics up to date as of October 12, 2026.

Eric Goodale (born November 9, 1985) is an American professional stock car racing driver who competes full-time in the NASCAR Whelen Modified Tour, driving the No. 58 for Goodie Racing. He is the younger brother of Kevin Goodale, and the first cousin of Jeff Goodale, who have both competed in the Modified Tour. Goodale's family owns and operates Riverhead Building Supply, a longtime supporter of modified racing.

Goodale is long-time competitor of the series, having made his debut in 2008, and has since won five races and three pole positions.

Goodale has also competed in the now defunct NASCAR Whelen Southern Modified Tour, as well as the Modified Racing Series, the Tri-Track Open Modified Series, the EXIT Realty Modified Touring Series, the Carolina Crate Modified Series, and the World Series of Asphalt Stock Car Racing Series.

== Motorsports results ==
=== NASCAR ===
(key) (Bold – Pole position awarded by qualifying time. Italics – Pole position earned by points standings or practice time. * – Most laps led.)

==== Whelen Modified Tour ====
NASCAR Whelen Modified Tour results
Year	Car owner	No.	Make	1	2	3	4	5	6	7	8	9	10	11	12	13	14	15	16	17	18	NWMTC	Pts	Ref
2008	Edgar Goodale	58	Chevy	TMP	STA	STA	TMP	NHA	SPE	RIV	STA	TMP	MAN	TMP	NHA	MAR; 10	CHE	STA; 19	TMP; DNQ			42nd	304	
2009	Edgar Goodale	58	Chevy	TMP; 23	STA; 11	STA; 27	NHA; 17	SPE; 8	RIV; 17	STA; 15	BRI; 9	TMP; 20	NHA; 17	MAR; 7	STA; 11	TMP; 12						11th	1546	
2010	Edgar Goodale	58	Chevy	TMP; 9	STA; 17	STA; 24	MAR; 24	NHA; 11	LIM; 18	MND; 14	RIV; 7	STA; 7	TMP; 9	BRI; 7	NHA; 8	STA; 12	TMP; 8					7th	1784	
2011	Edgar Goodale	58	Chevy	TMP; 24	STA; 11	STA; 21	MND; 18	TMP; 10	NHA; 6	RIV; 15	STA; 5	NHA; 24	BRI; 8	DEL; 13	TMP; 7	LRP; 19	NHA; 10	STA; 24	TMP; 10			12th	1955	
2012	Edgar Goodale	58	Chevy	TMP; 23	STA; 18	MND; 24	STA; 16	WFD; 24	NHA; 21	STA; 9	TMP; 24	BRI; 8	TMP; 11	RIV; 7	NHA; 18	STA; 17	TMP; 23					17th	374	
2013	Edgar Goodale	58	Chevy	TMP; 12	STA; 20	STA; 23	WFD; 7	RIV; 2	NHA; 25	**MND**; 20	STA; 6	TMP; 3	BRI; 7	RIV; 6	NHA; 7	STA; 18	TMP; 26					11th	435	
2014	Edgar Goodale	58	Chevy	TMP; 5	STA; 14	STA; 11	WFD; 25	RIV; 1	NHA; 19	MND; 3	STA; 5	TMP; 18	BRI; 7	NHA; 13	STA; 7	TMP; 8						7th	440	
2015	Edgar Goodale	58	Chevy	TMP; 7	STA; 4	WFD; 11	STA; 26	TMP; 8	RIV; 4	NHA; 8	MND; 6	STA; 8	TMP; 4	BRI; 18	RIV; 5	NHA; 28	STA; 14	TMP; 23				8th	486	
2016	Edgar Goodale	58	Chevy	TMP; 7	STA; 24	**WFD**; 20	STA; 4	TMP; 12	RIV; 7	NHA; 9	MND; 4	STA; 5	TMP; 15	BRI; 1	RIV; 10	OSW; 17	SEE; 6	NHA; 16	STA; 19	TMP; 8		7th	570	
2017	Edgar Goodale	58	Chevy	MYR; 18	TMP; 5	STA; 4	LGY; 2	TMP; 5	RIV; 6	NHA; 15	STA; 13	TMP; 8	BRI; 16	SEE; 14	OSW; 5	RIV; 9	NHA; 6	STA; 1	TMP; 16			5th	566	
2018	Edgar Goodale	58	Chevy	MYR; 7	TMP; 27	STA; 30	SEE; 19	TMP; 11	LGY; 5	RIV; 18	NHA; 5	STA; 3	TMP; 11	BRI; 10	OSW; 5	RIV; 14	NHA; 9	STA; 25	TMP; 10			7th	495	
2019	Edgar Goodale	58	Chevy	MYR; 9	SBO; 26	TMP; 3	STA; 5	WAL; 6	SEE; 25	TMP; 6	RIV; 8	NHA; 6	STA; 13	TMP; 13	OSW; 7	RIV; 13	NHA; 21	STA; 21	TMP; 6			6th	518	
2020	Edgar Goodale	58	Chevy	JEN; 14	WMM; 16	WMM; 9	JEN; 13	MND; 18	TMP; 14	NHA; 19	**STA**; 22	TMP; 27										15th	244	
2021	Edgar Goodale	58	Chevy	MAR; 1	STA; 2	RIV; 8	JEN; 18	OSW; 21	RIV; 20	NHA; 14	NRP; 5	STA; 9	BEE; 11	OSW; 12	RCH; 13	RIV; 5	STA; 9					6th	472	
2022	Edgar Goodale	58	Chevy	NSM; 2	RCH; 6	RIV; 9	LEE; 9	JEN; 11	MND; 6	RIV; 11	WAL; 15	NHA; 4	CLM; 12	TMP; 2	LGY; 12	OSW; 9	RIV; 5	TMP; 1	MAR; 7			3rd	588	
2023	Edgar Goodale	58	Chevy	NSM; 27	RCH; 10	MON; 7	RIV; 5	LEE	SEE	RIV; 11	WAL; 21	NHA; 13	LMP	THO; 3	LGY	OSW	MON	RIV; 16	NWS; 4	THO; 3	MAR; 23	14th	387	
2024	Edgar Goodale	58	Chevy	NSM; 26	RCH; 21	THO; 24	MON	RIV	SEE	NHA; 7	MON	LMP	THO; 10	OSW	RIV; 9	MON	THO	NWS	MAR			21st	169	
2025	Edgar Goodale	58	Chevy	NSM; 7	THO; 25	NWS; 31	SEE; 10	RIV; 14	WMM; Wth	LMP	MON	MON	THO; 5	RCH; 9	OSW	NHA; 8	RIV; 6	THO; 23	MAR; 7			14th	339	
2026	Edgar Goodale	58	Chevy	NSM; 10	MAR; 4	THO; 12	SEE; 18	RIV; 10	OXF; 3	SEE; 6	CLM; 9	WMM; 7	MON; 7	THO; 6	NHA; 23	STA; 9	OSW; 7	RIV; 5	THO; 6			7th	562	

==== Whelen Southern Modified Tour ====
NASCAR Whelen Southern Modified Tour results
Year	Car owner	No.	Make	1	2	3	4	5	6	7	8	9	10	11	12	NWSMTC	Pts	Ref
2013	Edgar Goodale	58	Chevy	CRW	SNM; 17	SBO	CRW	CRW	BGS	BRI	LGY	CRW	CRW	SNM	CLT	34th	27	
2015	Edgar Goodale	58	Chevy	CRW; 1	CRW; 2	SBO; 4	LGY	CRW; 3	BGS; 20	BRI	LGY	SBO	CLT			15th	194	
