= Bobby Measmer Jr. =

American racing driver

- Nationality: American
- Born: June 25, 1985 (age 41) Concord, North Carolina, U.S.

NASCAR Whelen Southern Modified Tour career
- Debut season: 2014
- Years active: 2014–2016
- Starts: 35
- Championships: 0
- Wins: 1
- Poles: 1
- Best finish: 5th in 2016
- Statistics up to date as of October 24, 2024.

Bobby Measmer Jr. (born June 25, 1985) is an American professional stock car racing driver who competed in the now defunct NASCAR Whelen Southern Modified Tour from 2014 to 2016.

Measmer has previously competed in series such as the NASCAR Whelen Modified Tour, the SMART Modified Tour, the Southern Modified Race Tour, the ASA Southern Modified Race Tour, and the World Series of Asphalt Stock Car Racing.

== Motorsports results ==
=== NASCAR ===
(key) (Bold – Pole position awarded by qualifying time. Italics – Pole position earned by points standings or practice time. * – Most laps led.)

==== Whelen Modified Tour ====
NASCAR Whelen Modified Tour results
Year	Car owner	No.	Make	1	2	3	4	5	6	7	8	9	10	11	12	13	14	NWMTC	Pts	Ref
2021	Kevin Hughes	14	Chevy	MAR; 14	STA	RIV	JEN	OSW	RIV	NHA	NRP	STA	BEE; 14	OSW	RCH; 15	RIV	STA	34th	89	

==== Whelen Southern Modified Tour ====
NASCAR Whelen Southern Modified Tour results
Year	Car owner	No.	Make	1	2	3	4	5	6	7	8	9	10	11	12	13	14	NWSMTC	Pts	Ref
2014	Bob Dillner	51	Chevy	CRW; 17	SNM; 16	SBO; 17	LGY; 7	CRW; 12	BGS; 19		LGY; 12	CRW; 14	SBO; 15	SNM; 12	CRW; 9	CRW; 10	CLT; 22	13th	421	
2014	Bob Dillner	76	Chevy							BRI; 13								13th	421	
2015	Kevin Hughes	74	Chevy	CRW; 5	CRW; 13	SBO; 14	LGY; 10	CRW; 8	BGS; 5	BRI; 8	LGY; 7	**SBO**; 3	CLT; 9					7th	358	
2016	Kevin Hughes	74	Chevy	CRW; 2	CON; 6	SBO; 11	CRW; 9	CRW; 5	BGS; 4		ECA; 1	SBO; 6	CRW; 9	CLT; 5				5th	426	
2016	Kevin Hughes	74S	Chevy							BRI; 4								5th	426	

=== SMART Modified Tour ===
SMART Modified Tour results
Year	Car owner	No.	Make	1	2	3	4	5	6	7	8	9	10	11	12	13	14	SMTC	Pts	Ref
2021	N/A	14	N/A	CRW	FLO	SBO	FCS	CRW	DIL	CAR	CRW	DOM	PUL	HCY; 6	ACE			11th	155	
2022	N/A	14	N/A	**FLO**; 10	SNM; 9	CRW; 6	SBO; 12	FCS; 3	CRW; 27			CAR; 6	DOM; 8	HCY; 18	TRI	PUL		10th	181	
2022	N/A	14NC	N/A							NWS; 20	NWS; 16							10th	181	
2023	N/A	14	Troyer	FLO; 15	**CRW**; 3	SBO; 11	HCY; 15	FCS; 14	CRW; 8	ACE; 3	CAR; 21	PUL	TRI; 2	SBO; 9	ROU			11th	313	
2024	N/A	14	N/A	FLO	CRW	SBO	TRI; DNS	ROU	HCY	FCS	CRW	JAC	CAR	CRW	DOM	SBO	NWS	55th	21	
