= 2009 NASCAR Nationwide Series =

American motorsport season

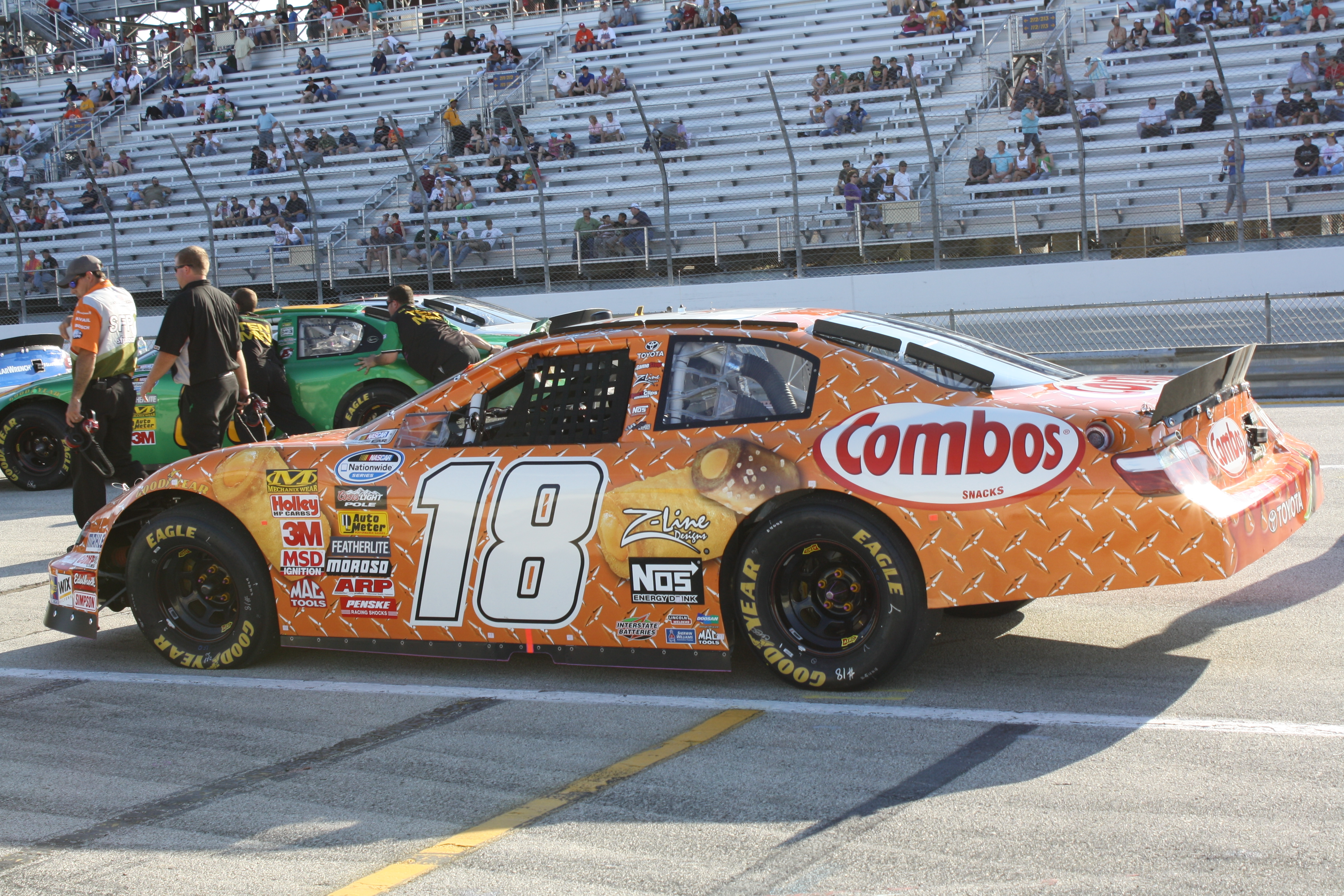
Kyle Busch's 2009 Nationwide championship car at Milwaukee

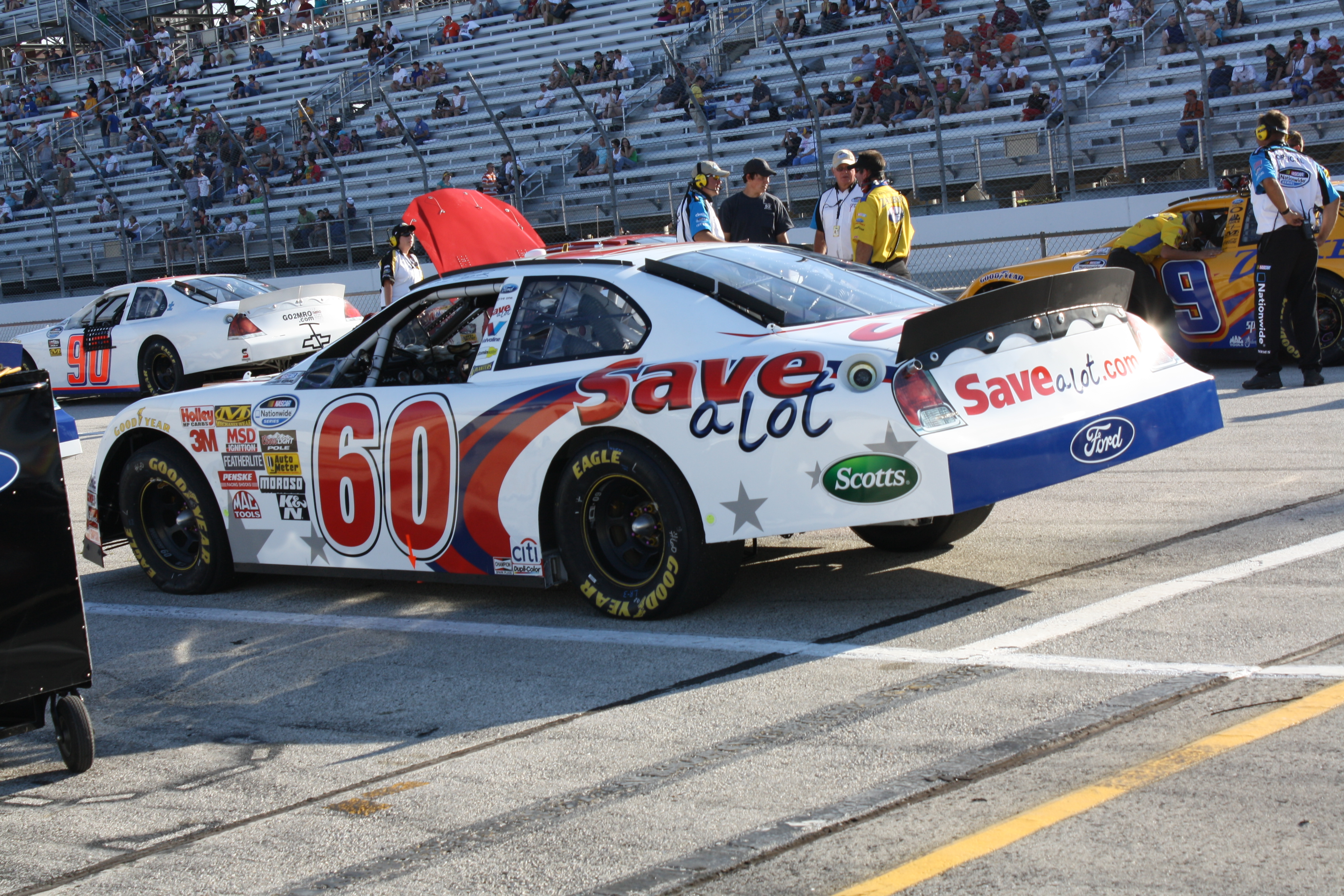
Carl Edwards, finished second in points driving the No. 60 Save-a-Lot car shown above.

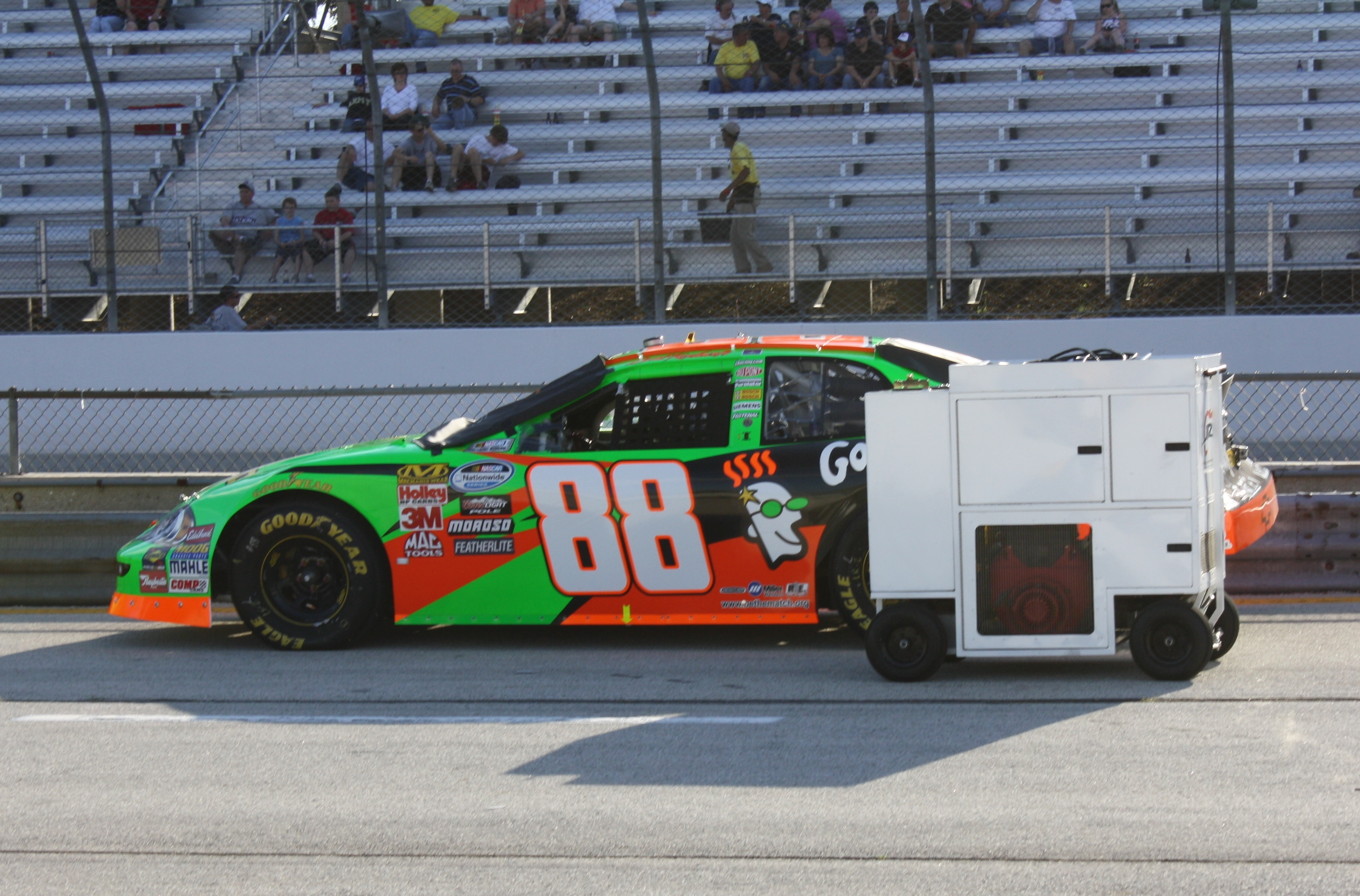
Brad Keselowski, who finished third in points driving the No. 88 GoDaddy.com car shown above, was the highest-finishing series regular in the standings.

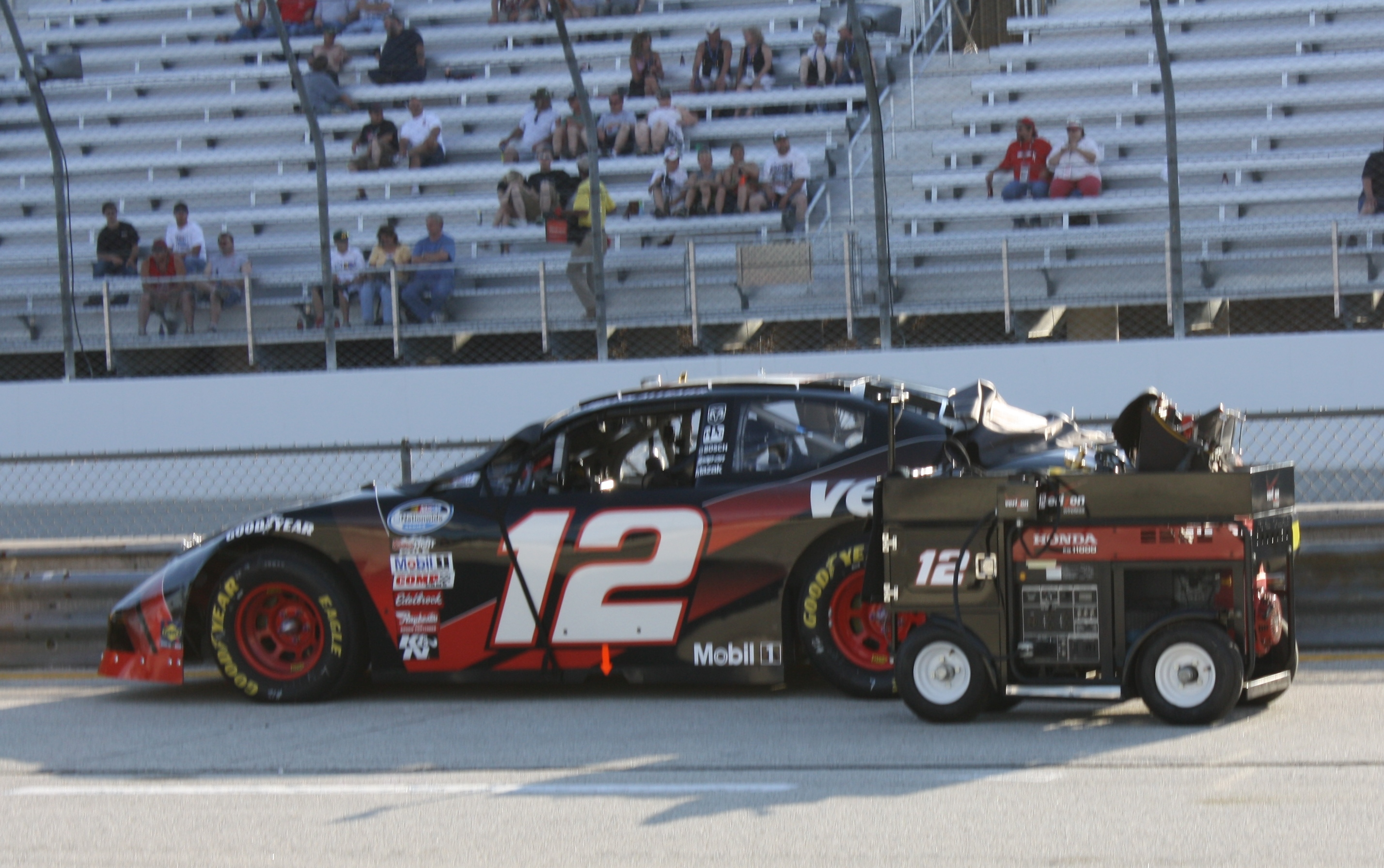
Justin Allgaier, who finished sixth in points driving the No. 12 Verizon car shown above, was the Rookie of the Year.

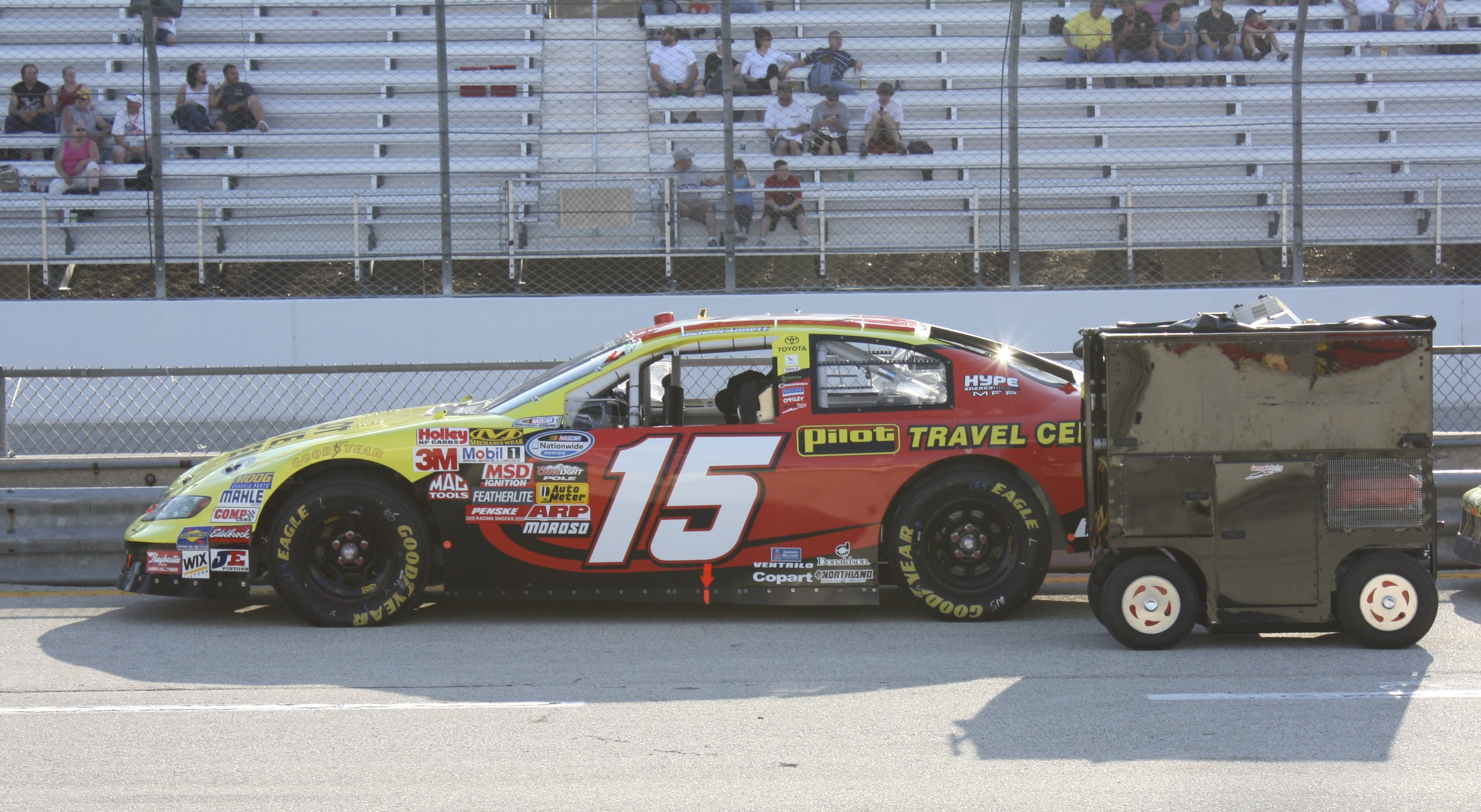
Toyota won the manufacturer's championship.

The 2009 NASCAR Nationwide Series was the 28th season of the NASCAR Nationwide Series, the second national stock car racing series sanctioned by NASCAR in the United States. The season began on February 14 at Daytona International Speedway with the Camping World 300. The season concluded on November 21 at Homestead–Miami Speedway with the Ford 300. With 25 top-five finishes, Kyle Busch was the season champion. He finished 210 points clear of Carl Edwards and 318 ahead of Brad Keselowski.

== Double-file restarts ==
Before the start of the season, NASCAR changed restart rules regarding the final moments of all races in the Sprint Cup, Nationwide Series and Camping World Truck Series. Previously, when the race was inside the final ten laps, all cars/trucks on the lead lap were in a single-file restart in that window. As of the 2009 season, the window changed to the final 20 laps. The "lucky dog"/"free pass" rule was still be eliminated in the last ten laps of a race. This rule will not matter starting at the July Daytona race, with the addition of "Double-File Restarts Shootout Style."

After being successful in the NASCAR Sprint Cup Series, NASCAR will implement a double-file restart system starting at the July Daytona race. The entire field will line up double-file, much like the start of the race at every restart. The leaders and other lead lap cars are now in front always when taking the green flag. Cars who choose to stay out and not pit during a caution flag who are in front of the leaders are now waved-around to restart (double file) at the back of the field. The lucky dog/free pass rule is now in effect the entire distance of the race, and the double-file restarts are for every restart, including green-white-checkered finishes. The only reason cars do not line up double-file in the order they are position wise on the leaderboard is if they are serving a penalty (in most cases, for pit road violations). The leader of the race also has the option of selecting which lane, inside or outside, to restart in, however, the 3rd place car (and 5th, 7th, and so on) will always restart on the inside.

== Schedule ==
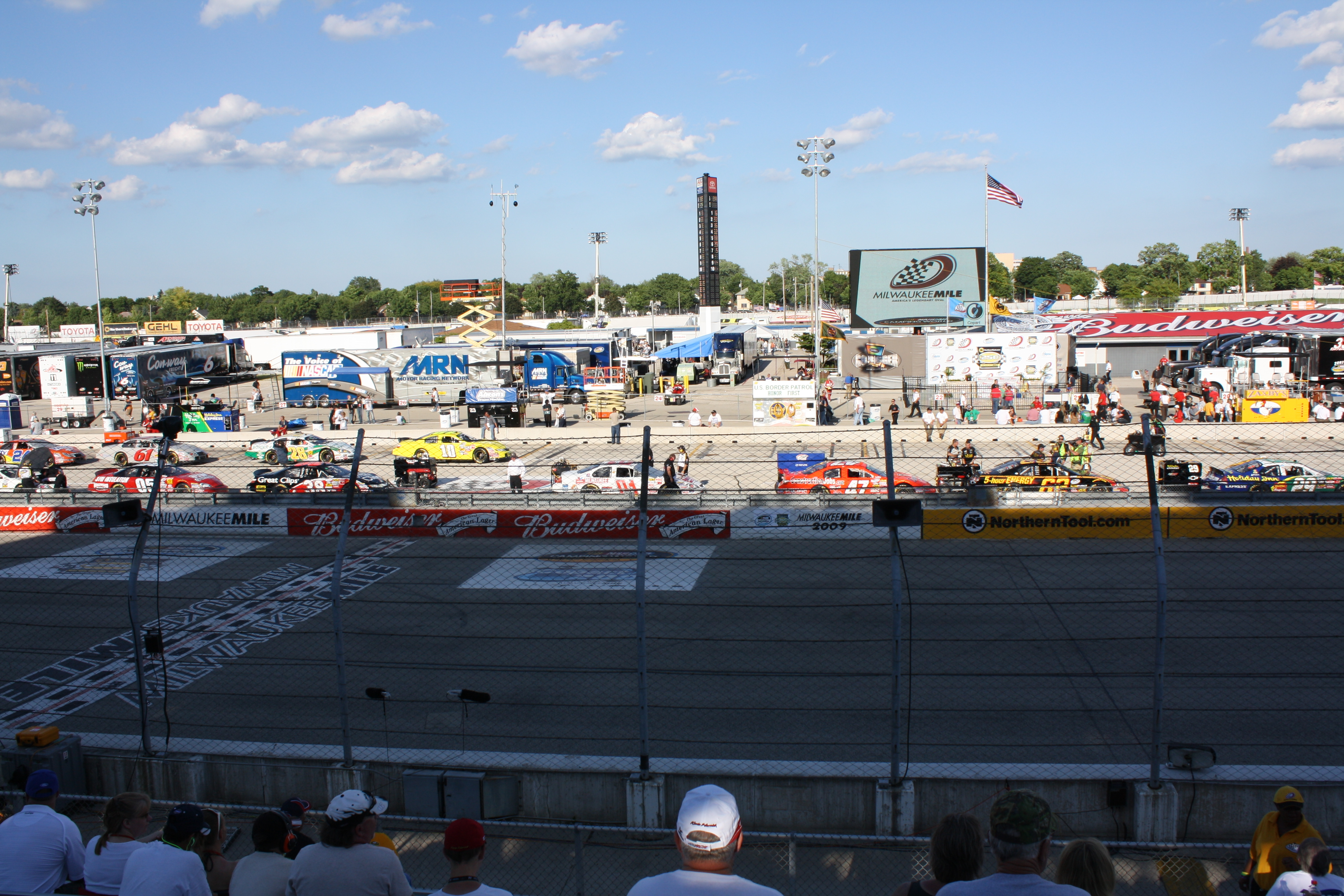
The infield of the Milwaukee Mile showing some of the field for the 2009 NorthernTool.com 250

| Round | Race | Venue | Winner | Date |
|---|---|---|---|---|
| 1 | Camping World 300 | Daytona International Speedway | Tony Stewart | February 14 |
| 2 | Stater Brothers 300 | Auto Club Speedway | Kyle Busch | February 21 |
| 3 | Sam's Town 300 | Las Vegas Motor Speedway | Greg Biffle | February 28 |
| 4 | Scotts Turf Builder 300 | Bristol Motor Speedway | Kevin Harvick | March 21 |
| 5 | O'Reilly 300 | Texas Motor Speedway | Kyle Busch | April 4 |
| 6 | Nashville 300 | Nashville Superspeedway | Joey Logano | April 11 |
| 7 | Bashas' Supermarkets 200 | Phoenix International Raceway | Greg Biffle | April 17 |
| 8 | Aaron's 312 | Talladega Superspeedway | David Ragan | April 25 |
| 9 | Lipton Tea 250 | Richmond International Raceway | Kyle Busch | May 1 |
| 10 | Diamond Hill Plywood 200 | Darlington Raceway | Matt Kenseth | May 8 |
| 11 | CarQuest Auto Parts 300 | Lowe's Motor Speedway | Mike Bliss | May 23 |
| 12 | Heluva Good! 200 | Dover International Speedway | Brad Keselowski | May 30 |
| 13 | Federated Auto Parts 300 | Nashville Superspeedway | Kyle Busch | June 6 |
| 14 | Meijer 300 | Kentucky Speedway | Joey Logano | June 13 |
| 15 | NorthernTool.com 250 | The Milwaukee Mile | Carl Edwards | June 20 |
| 16 | Camping World RV Sales 200 | New Hampshire Motor Speedway | Kyle Busch | June 27 |
| 17 | Subway Jalapeño 250 | Daytona International Speedway | Clint Bowyer | July 3 |
| 18 | Dollar General 300 | Chicagoland Speedway | Joey Logano | July 10 |
| 19 | Missouri-Illinois Dodge Dealers 250 | Gateway International Raceway | Kyle Busch | July 18 |
| 20 | Kroger 200 | O'Reilly Raceway Park | Carl Edwards | July 25 |
| 21 | U.S. Cellular 250 | Iowa Speedway | Brad Keselowski | August 1 |
| 22 | Zippo 200 | Watkins Glen International | Marcos Ambrose | August 8 |
| 23 | CarFax 250 | Michigan International Speedway | Brad Keselowski | August 15 |
| 24 | Food City 250 | Bristol Motor Speedway | David Ragan | August 21 |
| 25 | NAPA Auto Parts 200 | Circuit Gilles Villeneuve | Carl Edwards | August 30 |
| 26 | Degree Men V12 300 | Atlanta Motor Speedway | Kevin Harvick | September 5 |
| 27 | Virginia 529 College Savings 250 | Richmond International Raceway | Carl Edwards | September 11 |
| 28 | Dover 200 | Dover International Speedway | Clint Bowyer | September 26 |
| 29 | Kansas Lottery 300 | Kansas Speedway | Joey Logano | October 3 |
| 30 | Copart 300 | Auto Club Speedway | Joey Logano | October 10 |
| 31 | Dollar General 300 | Lowe's Motor Speedway | Kyle Busch | October 16 |
| 32 | Kroger on Track for the Cure 250 | Memphis Motorsports Park | Brad Keselowski | October 24 |
| 33 | O'Reilly Challenge | Texas Motor Speedway | Kyle Busch | November 7 |
| 34 | Able Body Labor 200 | Phoenix International Raceway | Carl Edwards | November 14 |
| 35 | Ford 300 | Homestead–Miami Speedway | Kyle Busch | November 21 |

== Teams and drivers ==
=== Full schedule ===
| Manufacturer | Team | No. | Driver | Crew chief |
|---|---|---|---|---|
| Chevrolet | Faith Motorsports | 89 | Morgan Shepherd | Morris Van Vleet 26; Nathan McGuire 1 Shannon Feldman 1 Jason Crouse 4 Zach Johnson 3 |
| Chevrolet | Jay Robinson Racing | 28 | Kenny Wallace | Chris Rice 26; Jay Robinson 6 Curtis Aldridge 3 |
| Chevrolet | Jay Robinson Racing | 49 | Kertus Davis 13 | Mark Fordham; Terry Richardson; Gary Cogswell; Curtis Aldridge; Jay Robinson |
| Chevrolet | Jay Robinson Racing | 49 | Kevin Hamlin 1 | Mark Fordham; Terry Richardson; Gary Cogswell; Curtis Aldridge; Jay Robinson |
| Chevrolet | Jay Robinson Racing | 49 | Mark Green 21 | Mark Fordham; Terry Richardson; Gary Cogswell; Curtis Aldridge; Jay Robinson |
| Chevrolet | JD Motorsports | 0 | Danny O'Quinn Jr. 1 | |
| Chevrolet | JD Motorsports | 0 | J. C. Stout 6 | |
| Chevrolet | JD Motorsports | 0 | Robert Richardson Jr. 1 | |
| Chevrolet | JD Motorsports | 0 | Steve Grissom 1 | |
| Chevrolet | JD Motorsports | 0 | Mark Green 8 | |
| Chevrolet | JD Motorsports | 0 | Mike Wallace 7 | |
| Chevrolet | JD Motorsports | 0 | Kertus Davis 3 | |
| Chevrolet | JD Motorsports | 0 | Andy Lally 1 | |
| Chevrolet | JD Motorsports | 0 | Jeremy Clements 7 | |
| Chevrolet | JD Motorsports | 01 | Mike Wallace 12 | |
| Chevrolet | JD Motorsports | 01 | Danny O'Quinn Jr. 23 | |
| Chevrolet | JR Motorsports | 88 | Brad Keselowski | Tony Eury |
| Chevrolet | Kevin Harvick, Inc. | 33 | Kevin Harvick 22 | Ernie Cope |
| Chevrolet | Kevin Harvick, Inc. | 33 | Tony Stewart 1 | Ernie Cope |
| Chevrolet | Kevin Harvick, Inc. | 33 | Kelly Bires 3 | Ernie Cope |
| Chevrolet | Kevin Harvick, Inc. | 33 | Ryan Newman 5 | Ernie Cope |
| Chevrolet | Kevin Harvick, Inc. | 33 | Cale Gale 1 | Ernie Cope |
| Chevrolet | Kevin Harvick, Inc. | 33 | Ron Hornaday Jr. 2 | Ernie Cope |
| Chevrolet | Kevin Harvick, Inc. | 33 | J. R. Fitzpatrick 1 | Ernie Cope |
| Chevrolet | Key Motorsports | 40 | Scott Wimmer 27 | Gary Showalter |
| Chevrolet | Key Motorsports | 40 | Jeff Green 1 | Gary Showalter |
| Chevrolet | Key Motorsports | 40 | Aric Almirola 3 | Gary Showalter |
| Chevrolet | Key Motorsports | 40 | Jeffrey Earnhardt 2 | Gary Showalter |
| Chevrolet | Key Motorsports | 40 | Mike Bliss 2 | Gary Showalter |
| Chevrolet | MSRP Motorsports | 90 | Johnny Chapman 32 | Michael Allen 3 Robert Huffman 32 |
| Chevrolet | MSRP Motorsports | 90 | Dave Blaney 1 | Michael Allen 3 Robert Huffman 32 |
| Chevrolet | MSRP Motorsports | 90 | Mike Bliss 1 | Michael Allen 3 Robert Huffman 32 |
| Chevrolet | MSRP Motorsports | 90 | Chris Cook 1 | Michael Allen 3 Robert Huffman 32 |
| Chevrolet | MSRP Motorsports | 91 | Terry Cook (R) 23 | Robert Huffman 3 Michael Allen 32 |
| Chevrolet | MSRP Motorsports | 91 | Justin Hobgood 3 | Robert Huffman 3 Michael Allen 32 |
| Chevrolet | MSRP Motorsports | 91 | Kelly Bires 2 | Robert Huffman 3 Michael Allen 32 |
| Chevrolet | MSRP Motorsports | 91 | Jeff Green 1 | Robert Huffman 3 Michael Allen 32 |
| Chevrolet | MSRP Motorsports | 91 | Chase Miller 3 | Robert Huffman 3 Michael Allen 32 |
| Chevrolet | MSRP Motorsports | 91 | Dave Blaney 2 | Robert Huffman 3 Michael Allen 32 |
| Chevrolet | MSRP Motorsports | 91 | Tom Hubert 1 | Robert Huffman 3 Michael Allen 32 |
| Chevrolet | Phoenix Racing | 1 | Mike Bliss 22 | Marc Reno |
| Chevrolet | Phoenix Racing | 1 | Ryan Newman 1 | Marc Reno |
| Chevrolet | Phoenix Racing | 1 | Reed Sorenson 3 | Marc Reno |
| Chevrolet | Phoenix Racing | 1 | Max Papis 1 | Marc Reno |
| Chevrolet | Phoenix Racing | 1 | Martin Truex Jr. 2 | Marc Reno |
| Chevrolet | Phoenix Racing | 1 | David Gilliland 3 | Marc Reno |
| Chevrolet | Phoenix Racing | 1 | Landon Cassill 1 | Marc Reno |
| Chevrolet | Phoenix Racing | 1 | James Buescher 2 | Marc Reno |
| Chevrolet | Richard Childress Racing | 29 | Clint Bowyer 12 | Dan Deeringhoff |
| Chevrolet | Richard Childress Racing | 29 | Jeff Burton 13 | Dan Deeringhoff |
| Chevrolet | Richard Childress Racing | 29 | Stephen Leicht 9 | Dan Deeringhoff |
| Chevrolet | Richard Childress Racing | 29 | Casey Mears 1 | Dan Deeringhoff |
| Chevrolet | Rusty Wallace Racing | 62 | Brendan Gaughan (R) | Bryan Berry 23; Shane Huffman 4 Dale Ferguson 8 |
| Chevrolet | Rusty Wallace Racing | 66 | Steve Wallace | Dale Ferguson 18; Tripp Bruce 17 |
| Chevrolet | R3 Motorsports | 23 | Robert Richardson Jr. 14 | Todd Brewer; Walter Giles; Steve Plattenberger |
| Chevrolet | R3 Motorsports | 23 | Ken Butler III (R) 17 | Todd Brewer; Walter Giles; Steve Plattenberger |
| Chevrolet | R3 Motorsports | 23 | Jeff Fuller 1 | Todd Brewer; Walter Giles; Steve Plattenberger |
| Chevrolet | R3 Motorsports | 23 | Chris Cook 1 | Todd Brewer; Walter Giles; Steve Plattenberger |
| Chevrolet | R3 Motorsports | 23 | Jean-François Dumoulin 1 | Todd Brewer; Walter Giles; Steve Plattenberger |
| Chevrolet | R3 Motorsports | 23 | Kevin Conway 1 | Todd Brewer; Walter Giles; Steve Plattenberger |
| Chevrolet | R3 Motorsports | 26 | Kevin Conway 6 | Jefferson Hodges |
| Dodge | Whitney Motorsports | 26 | Brian Keselowski 20 | Bob Keselowski |
| Dodge | Whitney Motorsports | 26 | Dennis Setzer 2 | Bob Keselowski |
| Dodge | Whitney Motorsports | 26 | Michael McDowell (R) 6 | Bob Keselowski |
| Dodge | Whitney Motorsports | 26 | Danny O'Quinn Jr. 1 | Bob Keselowski |
| Dodge | MacDonald Motorsports | 81 | D. J. Kennington 6 | David Ingram Jr. |
| Dodge | MacDonald Motorsports | 81 | Kevin Hamlin 5 | David Ingram Jr. |
| Dodge | MacDonald Motorsports | 81 | Jeff Green 1 | David Ingram Jr. |
| Dodge | MacDonald Motorsports | 81 | Bobby Hamilton Jr. 8 | David Ingram Jr. |
| Dodge | MacDonald Motorsports | 81 | Patrick Sheltra 2 | David Ingram Jr. |
| Dodge | MacDonald Motorsports | 81 | Michael McDowell 3 | David Ingram Jr. |
| Dodge | MacDonald Motorsports | 81 | Sean Murphy 3 | David Ingram Jr. |
| Dodge | MacDonald Motorsports | 81 | J. J. Yeley 1 | David Ingram Jr. |
| Dodge | MacDonald Motorsports | 81 | Alex Tagliani 2 | David Ingram Jr. |
| Dodge | MacDonald Motorsports | 81 | Mike Bliss 1 | David Ingram Jr. |
| Dodge | MacDonald Motorsports | 81 | Blake Koch 2 | David Ingram Jr. |
| Dodge | MacDonald Motorsports | 81 | Bobby Hillin Jr. 1 | David Ingram Jr. |
| Dodge | Penske Racing | 12 | Justin Allgaier (R) | Chad Walter |
| Ford | Baker Curb Racing | 27 | Jason Keller | Todd Gordon |
| Ford | RAB Racing | 09 | John Wes Townley (R) 32 | Blake Bainbridge |
| Ford | RAB Racing | 09 | Boris Said 2 | Blake Bainbridge |
| Ford | RAB Racing | 09 | Travis Kvapil 1 | Blake Bainbridge |
| Ford | Roush Fenway Racing | 6 | David Ragan 19 | Mike Kelley |
| Ford | Roush Fenway Racing | 6 | Erik Darnell (R) 16 | Mike Kelley |
| Ford | Roush Fenway Racing | 16 | Greg Biffle 14 | Eddie Pardue |
| Ford | Roush Fenway Racing | 16 | Matt Kenseth 14 | Eddie Pardue |
| Ford | Roush Fenway Racing | 16 | Ricky Stenhouse Jr. 6 | Eddie Pardue |
| Ford | Roush Fenway Racing | 16 | Colin Braun 1 | Eddie Pardue |
| Ford | Roush Fenway Racing | 60 | Carl Edwards | Dan Stillman |
| Ford | Specialty Racing | 61 | Brandon Whitt 15 | Doug Taylor |
| Ford | Specialty Racing | 61 | Matt Carter 15 | Doug Taylor |
| Ford | Specialty Racing | 61 | D. J. Kennington 1 | Doug Taylor |
| Ford | Specialty Racing | 61 | Kenny Hendrick 3 | Doug Taylor |
| Ford | Specialty Racing | 61 | Jason Bowles 1 | Doug Taylor |
| Ford | Team Rensi Motorsports | 24 | Eric McClure | Chris Wright |
| Toyota | Braun Racing | 10 | David Reutimann 7 | Todd Lohse 4 Cory Shea 1 Mike McCoige 2 Stewart Cooper 26; Mike Hillman Jr. 1 |
| Toyota | Braun Racing | 10 | Kelly Bires 4 | Todd Lohse 4 Cory Shea 1 Mike McCoige 2 Stewart Cooper 26; Mike Hillman Jr. 1 |
| Toyota | Braun Racing | 10 | Brian Scott 5 | Todd Lohse 4 Cory Shea 1 Mike McCoige 2 Stewart Cooper 26; Mike Hillman Jr. 1 |
| Toyota | Braun Racing | 10 | Burney Lamar 1 | Todd Lohse 4 Cory Shea 1 Mike McCoige 2 Stewart Cooper 26; Mike Hillman Jr. 1 |
| Toyota | Braun Racing | 10 | Marc Davis 2 | Todd Lohse 4 Cory Shea 1 Mike McCoige 2 Stewart Cooper 26; Mike Hillman Jr. 1 |
| Toyota | Braun Racing | 10 | Chad Blount 3 | Todd Lohse 4 Cory Shea 1 Mike McCoige 2 Stewart Cooper 26; Mike Hillman Jr. 1 |
| Toyota | Braun Racing | 10 | Elliott Sadler 1 | Todd Lohse 4 Cory Shea 1 Mike McCoige 2 Stewart Cooper 26; Mike Hillman Jr. 1 |
| Toyota | Braun Racing | 10 | Kasey Kahne 4 | Todd Lohse 4 Cory Shea 1 Mike McCoige 2 Stewart Cooper 26; Mike Hillman Jr. 1 |
| Toyota | Braun Racing | 10 | Justin Marks 5 | Todd Lohse 4 Cory Shea 1 Mike McCoige 2 Stewart Cooper 26; Mike Hillman Jr. 1 |
| Toyota | Braun Racing | 10 | Reed Sorenson 3 | Todd Lohse 4 Cory Shea 1 Mike McCoige 2 Stewart Cooper 26; Mike Hillman Jr. 1 |
| Toyota | Braun Racing | 32 | Brian Vickers 17 | Trent Owens |
| Toyota | Braun Racing | 32 | Burney Lamar 8 | Trent Owens |
| Toyota | Braun Racing | 32 | Reed Sorenson 2 | Trent Owens |
| Toyota | Braun Racing | 32 | David Reutimann 5 | Trent Owens |
| Toyota | Braun Racing | 32 | Brian Ickler 2 | Trent Owens |
| Toyota | Braun Racing | 32 | Jacques Villeneuve 1 | Trent Owens |
| Toyota | Braun Racing | 38 | Jason Leffler | Scott Zipadelli |
| Toyota | CJM Racing | 11 | Scott Lagasse Jr. (R) 21 | Paul Wolfe |
| Toyota | CJM Racing | 11 | Denny Hamlin 3 | Paul Wolfe |
| Toyota | CJM Racing | 11 | Brian Scott 2 | Paul Wolfe |
| Toyota | CJM Racing | 11 | Andrew Ranger 1 | Paul Wolfe |
| Toyota | CJM Racing | 11 | Kelly Bires 1 | Paul Wolfe |
| Toyota | CJM Racing | 11 | Trevor Bayne 2 | Paul Wolfe |
| Toyota | CJM Racing | 11 | Mike Bliss 5 | Paul Wolfe |
| Toyota | Germain Racing | 15 | Michael Annett (R) | Bruce Cook |
| Toyota | Joe Gibbs Racing | 18 | Kyle Busch | Joel Weidman 2 Jason Ratcliff 33 |
| Toyota | Joe Gibbs Racing | 20 | Joey Logano 22 | Ron Denton 2 Dave Rogers 31; Doug Hewitt 2 |
| Toyota | Joe Gibbs Racing | 20 | Denny Hamlin 4 | Ron Denton 2 Dave Rogers 31; Doug Hewitt 2 |
| Toyota | Joe Gibbs Racing | 20 | Brad Coleman 8 | Ron Denton 2 Dave Rogers 31; Doug Hewitt 2 |
| Toyota | Joe Gibbs Racing | 20 | Matt DiBenedetto 1 | Ron Denton 2 Dave Rogers 31; Doug Hewitt 2 |
| Toyota | JTG Daugherty Racing | 47 | Michael McDowell (R) 18 (Note: Chase Miller qualified the No. 47 car at Kansas (race #29), but was replaced in the race by Michael Mcdowell after he failed to qualify in his own No. 96 car.) | Gene Nead |
| Toyota | JTG Daugherty Racing | 47 | Kelly Bires 3 | Gene Nead |
| Toyota | JTG Daugherty Racing | 47 | Coleman Pressley 5 | Gene Nead |
| Toyota | JTG Daugherty Racing | 47 | Marcos Ambrose 2 | Gene Nead |
| Toyota | JTG Daugherty Racing | 47 | Chase Miller 7 | Gene Nead |
| Toyota | JTG Daugherty Racing | 47 | Chris Cook 1 | Gene Nead |
| Toyota | Michael Waltrip Racing | 99 | Michael Waltrip 7 | Jerry Baxter |
| Toyota | Michael Waltrip Racing | 99 | Scott Speed 13 | Jerry Baxter |
| Toyota | Michael Waltrip Racing | 99 | Trevor Bayne 12 | Jerry Baxter |
| Toyota | Michael Waltrip Racing | 99 | Patrick Carpentier 1 | Jerry Baxter |
| Toyota | Michael Waltrip Racing | 99 | David Reutimann 2 | Jerry Baxter |
| Chevrolet Dodge | Front Row Motorsports | 34 | Tony Raines | Scott Eggelston 32; Jim Mazza 3 |
| Chevrolet Ford | Day Enterprise Racing | 05 | Jeff Green 4 | Newt Moore |
| Chevrolet Ford | Day Enterprise Racing | 05 | Justin Ashburn 1 | Newt Moore |
| Chevrolet Ford | Day Enterprise Racing | 05 | Casey Atwood 23 | Newt Moore |
| Chevrolet Ford | Day Enterprise Racing | 05 | Brad Baker 2 | Newt Moore |
| Chevrolet Ford | Day Enterprise Racing | 05 | Victor Gonzalez Jr. 1 | Newt Moore |
| Chevrolet Ford | Day Enterprise Racing | 05 | Mark Day 3 | Newt Moore |
| Chevrolet Ford | Day Enterprise Racing | 05 | Blake Koch 1 | Newt Moore |
| Chevrolet Toyota | NEMCO Motorsports | 87 | Joe Nemechek 22 | Mike Boerschinger; Cory Shea |
| Chevrolet Toyota | NEMCO Motorsports | 87 | Kevin Conway 5 | Mike Boerschinger; Cory Shea |
| Chevrolet Toyota | NEMCO Motorsports | 87 | Chad Blount 1 | Mike Boerschinger; Cory Shea |
| Chevrolet Toyota | NEMCO Motorsports | 87 | Jeff Fuller 2 | Mike Boerschinger; Cory Shea |
| Chevrolet Toyota | NEMCO Motorsports | 87 | Mike Bliss 4 | Mike Boerschinger; Cory Shea |
| Chevrolet Toyota | NEMCO Motorsports | 87 | Dave Blaney 1 (Note: Blaney's race in the No. 87 at Charlotte in October (race #31) was in a partnership with Braun Racing.) | Mike Boerschinger; Cory Shea |

=== Limited schedule ===
| Manufacturer | Team | No. | Driver | Rounds |
|---|---|---|---|---|
| Chevrolet | Richard Childress Racing | 2 | Austin Dillon | 4 |
| Chevrolet | Richard Childress Racing | 2 | Sean Caisse | 2 |
| Chevrolet | Corrie Stott Racing | 02 | Andy Ponstein | 11 |
| Chevrolet | Kevin Harvick, Inc. | 4 | J. R. Fitzpatrick | 1 |
| Chevrolet | JD Motorsports | 04 | Mark Green | 1 |
| Chevrolet | JD Motorsports | 04 | Kertus Davis | 6 |
| Chevrolet | JR Motorsports | 5 | Dale Earnhardt Jr. | 7 |
| Chevrolet | JR Motorsports | 5 | Mark Martin | 1 |
| Chevrolet | JR Motorsports | 5 | Scott Wimmer | 6 |
| Chevrolet | JR Motorsports | 5 | Ryan Newman | 4 |
| Chevrolet | JR Motorsports | 5 | Ron Fellows | 2 |
| Chevrolet | JR Motorsports | 5 | Tony Stewart | 1 |
| Chevrolet | JR Motorsports | 5 | Richard Boswell | 1 |
| Chevrolet | JR Motorsports | 5 | Kelly Bires | 1 |
| Chevrolet | Stellar Quest Racing | 19 | J. C. Stout | 4 |
| Chevrolet | Trail Motorsports | 22 | Johnny Borneman III | 3 |
| Chevrolet | Rick Ware Racing | 31 | Stanton Barrett | 8 |
| Chevrolet | Rick Ware Racing | 31 | Kerry Earnhardt | 3 |
| Chevrolet | Rick Ware Racing | 31 | Tim Andrews | 4 |
| Chevrolet | Rick Ware Racing | 31 | Daryl Harr | 5 |
| Chevrolet | Rick Ware Racing | 31 | Travis Kittleson | 8 |
| Chevrolet | Rick Ware Racing | 31 | Jeffrey Earnhardt | 1 |
| Chevrolet | Rick Ware Racing | 31 | Kevin Hamlin | 1 |
| Chevrolet | Rick Ware Racing | 31 | Nick Joanides | 1 |
| Chevrolet | Rick Ware Racing | 41 | Derrike Cope | 3 |
| Chevrolet | Rick Ware Racing | 41 | Justin Hobgood | 4 |
| Chevrolet | Rick Ware Racing | 41 | Stanton Barrett | 2 |
| Chevrolet | Rick Ware Racing | 41 | Tom Hubert | 1 |
| Chevrolet | Rick Ware Racing | 41 | Kevin Hamlin | 2 |
| Chevrolet | Rick Ware Racing | 79 | Stanton Barrett | 1 |
| Chevrolet | SK Motorsports | 44 | Danny O'Quinn Jr. | 1 |
| Chevrolet | SK Motorsports | 44 | Jarit Johnson | 2 |
| Chevrolet | Clements Racing | 50 | Jeremy Clements | 6 |
| Chevrolet | Mac Hill Motorsports | 56 | Larry Foyt | 1 |
| Chevrolet | Horn Auto Racing | 58 | Chris Horn | 3 |
| Chevrolet | Xxxtreme Motorsports | 58 | Mike Harmon | 1 |
| Chevrolet | Xxxtreme Motorsports | 58 | Josh Wise | 2 |
| Chevrolet | Xxxtreme Motorsports | 58 | Chase Austin | 1 |
| Chevrolet | ML Motorsports | 70 | Mark Green | 2 |
| Chevrolet | ML Motorsports | 70 | Shelby Howard | 19 |
| Chevrolet | E.O.C. Motorsports | 71 | Joe Ruttman | 3 |
| Chevrolet | Bob Schacht Racing | 75 | Bobby Gerhart | 2 |
| Chevrolet | Bob Schacht Racing | 75 | Brandon Knupp | 1 |
| Chevrolet | Bob Schacht Racing | 75 | Kenny Hendrick | 1 |
| Chevrolet | Herd Racing | 75 | Brett Rowe | 2 |
| Chevrolet | Cardinal Motorsports | 77 | Peyton Sellers | 12 |
| Chevrolet | Hendrick Motorsports | 80 | Tony Stewart | 1 |
| Chevrolet | Mike Harmon Racing | 84 | Mike Harmon | 12 |
| Chevrolet | Mike Harmon Racing | 84 | Jennifer Jo Cobb | 1 |
| Dodge | Penske Racing | 22 | Parker Kligerman | 2 |
| Dodge | Smith-Ganassi Racing | 42 | Kenny Hendrick | 11 |
| Dodge | Smith-Ganassi Racing | 42 | David Gilliland | 3 |
| Dodge | Smith-Ganassi Racing | 42 | Kevin Hamlin | 1 |
| Dodge | Smith-Ganassi Racing | 42 | Scott Lagasse Jr. | 1 |
| Dodge | Smith-Ganassi Racing | 42 | Aric Almirola | 1 |
| Dodge | Smith-Ganassi Racing | 42 | Todd Kluever | 1 |
| Dodge | Smith-Ganassi Racing | 42 | Todd Bodine | 1 (Note: Todd Bodine qualified the No. 42 car at Homestead (race #35), but was replaced in the race by Parker Kligerman after he failed to qualify in his own No. 22 car.) |
| Dodge | Smith-Ganassi Racing | 42 | Parker Kligerman | 1 |
| Dodge | Derrike Cope, Inc. | 73 | Kevin Lepage | 3 |
| Dodge | Derrike Cope, Inc. | 73 | Derrike Cope | 14 |
| Dodge | Derrike Cope, Inc. | 73 | Chase Miller | 1 |
| Dodge | Derrike Cope, Inc. | 78 | Kevin Lepage | 9 |
| Dodge | Derrike Cope, Inc. | 78 | Derrike Cope | 2 |
| Dodge | Derrike Cope, Inc. | 79 | Jennifer Jo Cobb | 1 |
| Dodge | TW Racing | 86 | Antonio Pérez | 2 |
| Dodge | Whitney Motorsports | 92 | Willie Allen | 3 |
| Dodge | Whitney Motorsports | 92 | Dennis Setzer | 5 |
| Dodge | Whitney Motorsports | 96 | Dennis Setzer | 14 (Note: Dennis Setzer qualified the No. 96 car at Texas I (race #5), but was replaced in the race by Brian Keselowski after he failed to qualify in his own No. 26 car.) |
| Dodge | Whitney Motorsports | 96 | Brian Keselowski | 4 |
| Dodge | Whitney Motorsports | 96 | Willie Allen | 3 |
| Dodge | Whitney Motorsports | 96 | Blake Bjorklund | 1 |
| Dodge | Whitney Motorsports | 96 | Andy Ponstein | 1 |
| Dodge | Whitney Motorsports | 96 | Michael McDowell | 8 |
| Ford | Roush Fenway Racing | 17 | Matt Kenseth | 1 |
| Ford | Roush Fenway Racing | 17 | Ricky Stenhouse Jr. | 1 |
| Ford | Rensi-Hamilton Racing | 25 | Bobby Hamilton Jr. | 1 |
| Ford | Go Green Racing | 39 | Eddie MacDonald | 2 |
| Ford | Means Racing | 55 | Brad Teague | 1 |
| Ford | VSI Racing | 72 | Benny Gordon | 9 |
| Ford | Ray Hackett Racing | 76 | Ryan Hackett | 1 |
| Ford | Borneman Racing | 83 | Johnny Borneman III | 8 |
| Ford | Yates Racing | 98 | Paul Menard | 17 |
| Ford | Baker Curb Racing | 37 | Kevin Hamlin | 2 |
| Ford | Baker Curb Racing | 43 | Josh Wise | 1 |
| Toyota | Braun Racing with Richard Petty Motorsports | 43 | Kasey Kahne | 1 |
| Toyota | CJM Racing | 14 | Justin Lofton | 1 |
| Toyota | Marc Davis Motorsports | 36 | Marc Davis | 3 |
| Toyota | Robby Gordon Motorsports | 55 | Robby Gordon | 1 |
| Chevrolet Ford | Day Enterprise Racing | 85 | Justin Ashburn | 1 |
| Chevrolet Ford | Day Enterprise Racing | 85 | Casey Atwood | 3 |
| Chevrolet Ford | Day Enterprise Racing | 85 | Brad Baker | 1 |
| Chevrolet Ford | Day Enterprise Racing | 85 | Jeff Green | 1 |
| Chevrolet Ford | Smith-Ganassi Racing | 52 | Trevor Bayne | 1 |
| Chevrolet Ford | Means Racing | 52 | Donnie Neuenberger | 3 |
| Chevrolet Ford | Means Racing | 52 | Scott Gaylord | 3 |
| Chevrolet Ford | Means Racing | 52 | Kevin Lepage | 8 |
| Chevrolet Ford | Means Racing | 52 | Brad Teague | 5 |
| Chevrolet Ford | Means Racing | 52 | Kevin Hamlin | 4 |
| Chevrolet Ford | Means Racing | 52 | Chris Lawson | 3 |
| Chevrolet Ford | Means Racing | 52 | Jack Smith | 1 |
| Chevrolet Ford | Means Racing | 52 | Mike Wallace | 1 |
| Chevrolet Ford | Means Racing | 52 | Tony Ave | 2 |
| Chevrolet Toyota | SK Motorsports | 07 | David Green | 9 |
| Chevrolet Toyota | SK Motorsports | 07 | Patrick Carpentier | 1 |
| Chevrolet Toyota | SK Motorsports | 07 | Donny Lia | 1 |
| Chevrolet Toyota | SK Motorsports | 07 | Mike Harmon | 7 |
| Chevrolet Toyota | SK Motorsports | 07 | Chase Mattioli | 1 |
| Chevrolet Toyota | SK Motorsports | 07 | Kris Szekeres | 1 |
| Chevrolet Toyota | SK Motorsports | 07 | Jason White | 1 |
| Chevrolet Toyota | SK Motorsports | 07 | Josh Wise | 1 |
| Chevrolet Toyota | SK Motorsports | 07 | Jarit Johnson | 2 |
| Chevrolet Toyota | SK Motorsports | 07 | Danny O'Quinn Jr. | 6 |
| Chevrolet Toyota | Xxxtreme Motorsports | 07 | Chase Austin | 4 |

==== Notes ====
- Penske purchased the #59 car's 2008 owner's points from JTG Daugherty Racing for the 2009 season.
- The #23 car's owners points were purchased from JD Motorsports for the season, coming from the #01 car in 2008.
- RAB Racing used Jay Robinson's #4 car's owner points from 2008, which had previously belonged to James Finch.
- The 07 team used the former Fitz Motorsports' teams owner points. Fitz now runs as Trail Motorsports.

== Races ==
=== Camping World 300 ===
The Camping World 300 was held February 14 at Daytona International Speedway. Kevin Harvick took the pole but Tony Stewart won the race.

Top ten finishers
| Pos. | Car # | Driver | Make | Team |
|---|---|---|---|---|
| 1 | 80 | Tony Stewart | Chevrolet | Hendrick Motorsports |
| 2 | 60 | Carl Edwards | Ford | Roush Fenway Racing |
| 3 | 29 | Clint Bowyer | Chevrolet | Richard Childress Racing |
| 4 | 18 | Kyle Busch | Toyota | Joe Gibbs Racing |
| 5 | 16 | Greg Biffle | Ford | Roush Fenway Racing |
| 6 | 32 | Brian Vickers | Toyota | Braun Racing |
| 7 | 5 | Dale Earnhardt Jr. | Chevrolet | JR Motorsports |
| 8 | 6 | David Ragan | Ford | Roush Fenway Racing |
| 9 | 27 | Jason Keller | Ford | Baker Curb Racing |
| 10 | 17 | Matt Kenseth | Ford | Roush Fenway Racing |
Danny O'Quinn Jr. finished 23rd and suffered a 25-point penalty.
Mike Harmon finished 29th and suffered a 25-point penalty.
John Wes Townley finished 21st and suffered a 100-point penalty.
All 3 drivers for unapproved adjustments on their cars.

Did not qualify: Larry Foyt (#56), Johnny Chapman (#90), Stanton Barrett (#31), Terry Cook (#91), Derrike Cope (#41), Johnny Borneman, III (#22).

- Justin Ashburn (#85) withdraw prior qualifying for unknown reasons.

=== Stater Brothers 300 ===
The Stater Brothers 300 was held February 21 at Auto Club Speedway. Carl Edwards took the pole but Kyle Busch won the race.

Top ten finishers
| Pos. | Car # | Driver | Make | Team |
|---|---|---|---|---|
| 1 | 18 | Kyle Busch | Toyota | Joe Gibbs Racing |
| 2 | 33 | Kevin Harvick | Chevrolet | Kevin Harvick, Inc. |
| 3 | 20 | Joey Logano | Toyota | Joe Gibbs Racing |
| 4 | 60 | Carl Edwards | Ford | Roush Fenway Racing |
| 5 | 6 | David Ragan | Ford | Roush Fenway Racing |
| 6 | 29 | Jeff Burton | Chevrolet | Richard Childress Racing |
| 7 | 10 | David Reutimann | Toyota | Braun Racing |
| 8 | 32 | Brian Vickers | Toyota | Braun Racing |
| 9 | 62 | Brendan Gaughan (R) | Chevrolet | Rusty Wallace Racing |
| 10 | 66 | Steve Wallace | Chevrolet | Rusty Wallace Racing |

Did not qualify: Scott Wimmer (#40), Johnny Borneman, III (#22), Mike Harmon (#84), Andy Ponstein (#02).

=== Sam's Town 300 ===
The Sam's Town 300 was held February 28 at Las Vegas Motor Speedway. Scott Speed took the pole but Greg Biffle won the race.

Top ten finishers
| Pos. | Car # | Driver | Make | Team |
|---|---|---|---|---|
| 1 | 16 | Greg Biffle | Ford | Roush Fenway Racing |
| 2 | 60 | Carl Edwards | Ford | Roush Fenway Racing |
| 3 | 32 | Brian Vickers | Toyota | Braun Racing |
| 4 | 38 | Jason Leffler | Toyota | Braun Racing |
| 5 | 5 | Dale Earnhardt Jr. | Chevrolet | JR Motorsports |
| 6 | 47 | Michael McDowell | Toyota | JTG Daugherty Racing |
| 7 | 62 | Brendan Gaughan (R) | Chevrolet | Rusty Wallace Racing |
| 8 | 12 | Justin Allgaier (R) | Dodge | Penske Championship Racing |
| 9 | 11 | Scott Lagasse Jr. (R) | Toyota | CJM Racing |
| 10 | 29 | Jeff Burton | Chevrolet | Richard Childress Racing |

Did not qualify: Derrike Cope (#41), Kertus Davis (#49), Johnny Borneman, III (#22), Mike Harmon (#84).

=== Scotts Turf Builder 300 ===
The Scotts Turf Builder 300 was held March 21 at Bristol Motor Speedway. Brendan Gaughan got his first Nationwide series career pole but Kevin Harvick won the race.

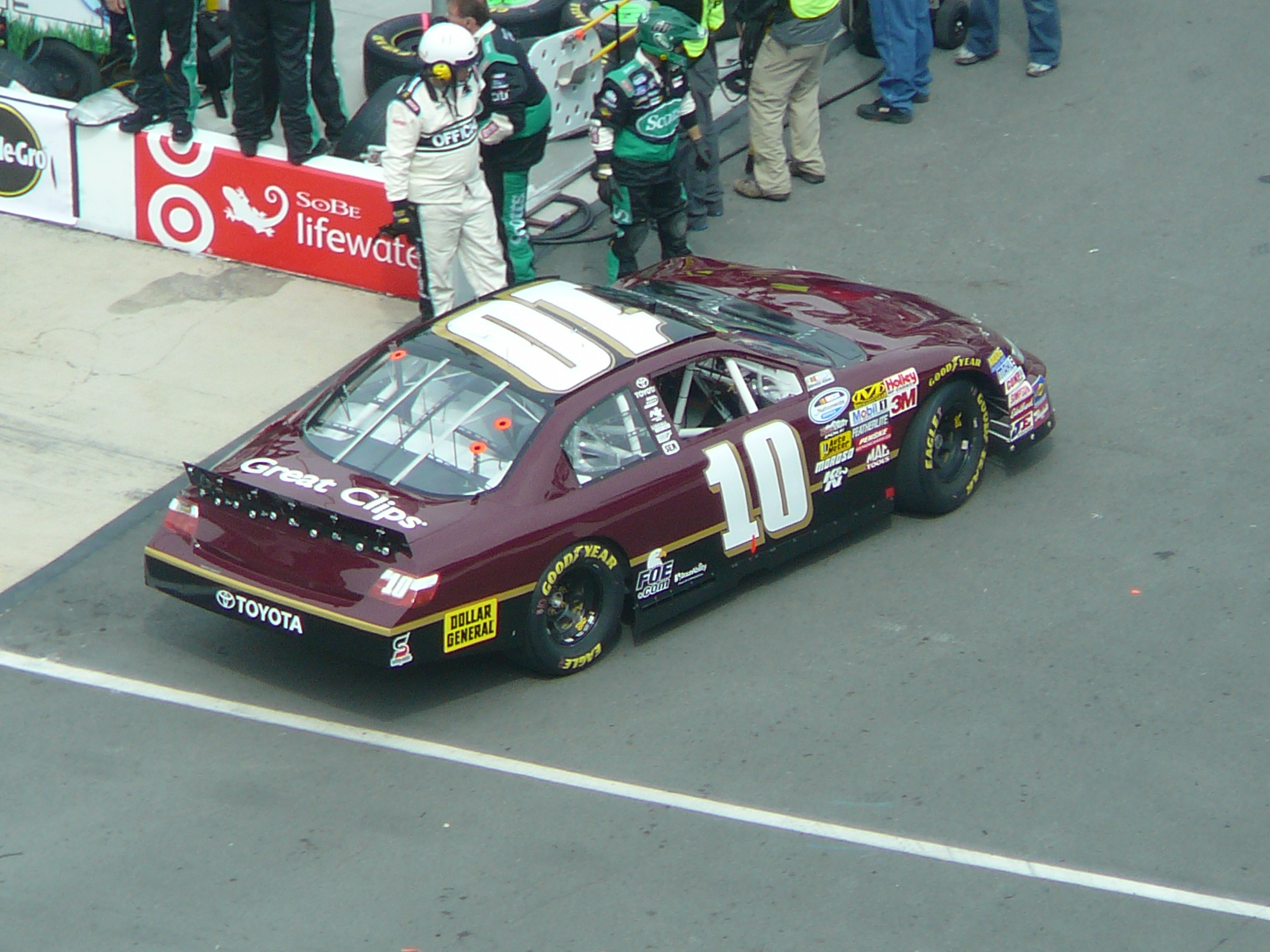
Kelly Bires pulls the #10 Braun Racing Toyota in to the garage at the Scotts Turf Builder 300 at Bristol

Top ten finishers
| Pos. | Car # | Driver | Make | Team |
|---|---|---|---|---|
| 1 | 33 | Kevin Harvick | Chevrolet | Kevin Harvick, Inc. |
| 2 | 60 | Carl Edwards | Ford | Roush Fenway Racing |
| 3 | 29 | Clint Bowyer | Chevrolet | Richard Childress Racing |
| 4 | 16 | Matt Kenseth | Ford | Roush Fenway Racing |
| 5 | 12 | Justin Allgaier (R) | Dodge | Penske Championship Racing |
| 6 | 18 | Kyle Busch | Toyota | Joe Gibbs Racing |
| 7 | 66 | Steve Wallace | Chevrolet | Rusty Wallace Racing |
| 8 | 99 | Scott Speed | Toyota | Michael Waltrip Racing |
| 9 | 20 | Joey Logano | Toyota | Joe Gibbs Racing |
| 10 | 38 | Jason Leffler | Toyota | Braun Racing |

Did not qualify: Mark Green (#70), Kertus Davis (#49), Brad Teague (#55), Brian Keselowski (#26), Stanton Barrett (#31), Mike Harmon (#84), Benny Gordon (#72).

- Joe Ruttman (#71) was forced to withdraw after a wreck in final practice.

=== O'Reilly 300 ===
The O'Reilly 300 was held April 4 at Texas Motor Speedway. Kyle Busch took the pole and won the race.

Top ten finishers
| Pos. | Car # | Driver | Make | Team |
|---|---|---|---|---|
| 1 | 18 | Kyle Busch | Toyota | Joe Gibbs Racing |
| 2 | 33 | Tony Stewart | Chevrolet | Kevin Harvick, Inc. |
| 3 | 88 | Brad Keselowski | Chevrolet | JR Motorsports |
| 4 | 6 | David Ragan | Ford | Roush Fenway Racing |
| 5 | 98 | Paul Menard | Ford | Yates Racing |
| 6 | 16 | Matt Kenseth | Ford | Roush Fenway Racing |
| 7 | 1 | Mike Bliss | Chevrolet | Phoenix Racing |
| 8 | 29 | Jeff Burton | Chevrolet | Richard Childress Racing |
| 9 | 10 | David Reutimann | Toyota | Braun Racing |
| 10 | 12 | Justin Allgaier (R) | Dodge | Penske Championship Racing |

Did not qualify: Scott Wimmer (#40), Josh Wise (#43), Brian Keselowski (#26), Kertus Davis (#49), Kerry Earnhardt (#31), Mike Harmon (#84).

- Brian Keselowski replaced Dennis Setzer in the #96 car in the race, after failing to qualify his #26.

=== Nashville 300 ===
The Nashville 300 was held on April 11 at Nashville Superspeedway. Joey Logano won his 2nd career NNS race. 1992 series champion Joe Nemechek took a wild ride after contact with several cars and flipped once. The car was fine, and he drove it around the track a few times before being black-flagged.

Top ten finishers
| Pos. | Car # | Driver | Make | Team |
|---|---|---|---|---|
| 1 | 20 | Joey Logano | Toyota | Joe Gibbs Racing |
| 2 | 18 | Kyle Busch | Toyota | Joe Gibbs Racing |
| 3 | 88 | Brad Keselowski | Chevrolet | JR Motorsports |
| 4 | 33 | Kelly Bires | Chevrolet | Kevin Harvick, Inc. |
| 5 | 60 | Carl Edwards | Ford | Roush Fenway Racing |
| 6 | 38 | Jason Leffler | Toyota | Braun Racing |
| 7 | 6 | David Ragan | Ford | Roush Fenway Racing |
| 8 | 1 | Mike Bliss | Chevrolet | Phoenix Racing |
| 9 | 66 | Steve Wallace | Chevrolet | Rusty Wallace Racing |
| 10 | 11 | Scott Lagasse Jr. (R) | Toyota | CJM Racing |

Did not qualify: Brad Teague (#52), Andy Ponstein (#02), Mike Harmon (#84), Ryan Hackett (#76), Mark Green (#0).

=== Bashas' Supermarket 200 ===
The Bashas' Supermarket 200 was held April 17 at Phoenix International Raceway. Carl Edwards took the pole but Greg Biffle won the race.

Top ten finishers
| Pos. | Car # | Driver | Make | Team |
|---|---|---|---|---|
| 1 | 16 | Greg Biffle | Ford | Roush Fenway Racing |
| 2 | 38 | Jason Leffler | Toyota | Braun Racing |
| 3 | 88 | Brad Keselowski | Chevrolet | JR Motorsports |
| 4 | 20 | Joey Logano | Toyota | Joe Gibbs Racing |
| 5 | 33 | Kevin Harvick | Chevrolet | Kevin Harvick, Inc. |
| 6 | 6 | David Ragan | Ford | Roush Fenway Racing |
| 7 | 62 | Brendan Gaughan | Chevrolet | Rusty Wallace Racing |
| 8 | 12 | Justin Allgaier (R) | Dodge | Penske Championship Racing |
| 9 | 1 | Mike Bliss | Chevrolet | Phoenix Racing |
| 10 | 18 | Kyle Busch | Toyota | Joe Gibbs Racing |

Did not qualify: Kenny Hendrick (#42), Andy Ponstein (#02), Mike Harmon (#84), Dennis Setzer (#96).

=== Aaron's 312 ===
The Aaron's 312 was held April 25 at Talladega Superspeedway. David Ragan edged out Ryan Newman by .030 of a second for his first win in any of NASCAR's three top national series. Matt Kenseth had a scary wreck in which he flipped 3 times on the backstretch. Kenseth was uninjured.

Top ten finishers
| Pos. | Car # | Driver | Make | Team |
|---|---|---|---|---|
| 1 | 6 | David Ragan | Ford | Roush Fenway Racing |
| 2 | 33 | Ryan Newman | Chevrolet | Kevin Harvick, Inc. |
| 3 | 20 | Joey Logano | Toyota | Joe Gibbs Racing |
| 4 | 34 | Tony Raines | Chevrolet | Front Row Motorsports |
| 5 | 5 | Dale Earnhardt Jr. | Chevrolet | JR Motorsports |
| 6 | 38 | Jason Leffler | Toyota | Braun Racing |
| 7 | 27 | Jason Keller | Ford | Baker Curb Racing |
| 8 | 11 | Scott Lagasse Jr. (R) | Toyota | CJM Racing |
| 9 | 88 | Brad Keselowski | Chevrolet | JR Motorsports |
| 10 | 18 | Kyle Busch | Toyota | Joe Gibbs Racing |

Did not qualify: Johnny Chapman (#90), Justin Hobgood (#91), Scott Wimmer (#40), Mike Harmon (#84).

=== Lipton Tea 250 ===
The Lipton Tea 250 was held May 1 at Richmond International Raceway. Matt Kenseth took the pole but Kyle Busch won the race.

Top ten finishers
| Pos. | Car # | Driver | Make | Team |
|---|---|---|---|---|
| 1 | 18 | Kyle Busch | Toyota | Joe Gibbs Racing |
| 2 | 60 | Carl Edwards | Ford | Roush Fenway Racing |
| 3 | 16 | Matt Kenseth | Ford | Roush Fenway Racing |
| 4 | 88 | Brad Keselowski | Chevrolet | JR Motorsports |
| 5 | 33 | Kevin Harvick | Chevrolet | Kevin Harvick, Inc. |
| 6 | 20 | Joey Logano | Toyota | Joe Gibbs Racing |
| 7 | 5 | Mark Martin | Chevrolet | JR Motorsports |
| 8 | 47 | Michael McDowell | Toyota | JTG Daugherty Racing |
| 9 | 27 | Jason Keller | Ford | Baker Curb Racing |
| 10 | 38 | Jason Leffler | Toyota | Braun Racing |

Did not qualify: Kevin Hamlin (#52), Kenny Hendrick (#42), Travis Kittleson (#31), John Wes Townley (#09), Mike Harmon (#84).

=== Diamond Hill Plywood 200 ===
The Diamond Hill Plywood 200 was held May 8 at Darlington Raceway. The qualify rained out so Kyle Busch started 1st but Matt Kenseth won the race.

Top ten finishers
| Pos. | Car # | Driver | Make | Team |
|---|---|---|---|---|
| 1 | 16 | Matt Kenseth | Ford | Roush Fenway Racing |
| 2 | 38 | Jason Leffler | Toyota | Braun Racing |
| 3 | 60 | Carl Edwards | Ford | Roush Fenway Racing |
| 4 | 6 | Erik Darnell (R) | Ford | Roush Fenway Racing |
| 5 | 12 | Justin Allgaier (R) | Dodge | Penske Championship Racing |
| 6 | 33 | Kevin Harvick | Chevrolet | Kevin Harvick, Inc. |
| 7 | 1 | Mike Bliss | Chevrolet | Phoenix Racing |
| 8 | 29 | Jeff Burton | Chevrolet | Richard Childress Racing |
| 9 | 5 | Scott Wimmer | Chevrolet | JR Motorsports |
| 10 | 32 | Brian Vickers | Toyota | Braun Racing |

Did not qualify: Dennis Setzer (#96), Paul Menard (#98), Derrike Cope (#73), Justin Hobgood (#41).

=== CarQuest Auto Parts 300 ===
The CarQuest Auto Parts 300 was held May 23 at Lowe's Motor Speedway. Carl Edwards took the pole. The race was shortened to 170 laps due to rain so Mike Bliss won the race.

Top ten finishers
| Pos. | Car # | Driver | Make | Team |
|---|---|---|---|---|
| 1 | 1 | Mike Bliss | Chevrolet | Phoenix Racing |
| 2 | 62 | Brendan Gaughan (R) | Chevrolet | Rusty Wallace Racing |
| 3 | 18 | Kyle Busch | Toyota | Joe Gibbs Racing |
| 4 | 32 | Brian Vickers | Toyota | Braun Racing |
| 5 | 20 | Joey Logano | Toyota | Joe Gibbs Racing |
| 6 | 38 | Jason Leffler | Toyota | Braun Racing |
| 7 | 6 | David Ragan | Ford | Roush Fenway Racing |
| 8 | 88 | Brad Keselowski | Chevrolet | JR Motorsports |
| 9 | 29 | Jeff Burton | Chevrolet | Richard Childress Racing |
| 10 | 60 | Carl Edwards | Ford | Roush Fenway Racing |

Did not qualify: Morgan Shepherd (#89), Casey Atwood (#05), John Wes Townley (#09), Kevin Lepage (#52), Kertus Davis (#49), Marc Davis (#36), Mike Harmon (#84).

- Brandon Knupp (#75) was forced to withdraw after a wreck in practice.

=== Heluva Good! 200 ===
The Heluva Good! 200 was held May 30 at Dover International Speedway. Joey Logano took the pole but Brad Keselowski won the race.

Top ten finishers
| Pos. | Car # | Driver | Make | Team |
|---|---|---|---|---|
| 1 | 88 | Brad Keselowski | Chevrolet | JR Motorsports |
| 2 | 20 | Joey Logano | Toyota | Joe Gibbs Racing |
| 3 | 29 | Clint Bowyer | Chevrolet | Richard Childress Racing |
| 4 | 32 | Brian Vickers | Toyota | Braun Racing |
| 5 | 60 | Carl Edwards | Ford | Roush Fenway Racing |
| 6 | 98 | Paul Menard | Ford | Yates Racing |
| 7 | 99 | Scott Speed | Toyota | Michael Waltrip Racing |
| 8 | 38 | Jason Leffler | Toyota | Braun Racing |
| 9 | 27 | Jason Keller | Ford | Baker Curb Racing |
| 10 | 12 | Justin Allgaier (R) | Dodge | Penske Championship Racing |

Did not qualify: Jeffrey Earnhardt (#31).

=== Federated Auto Parts 300 ===
The Federated Auto Parts 300 was held June 6 at Nashville Superspeedway and was dominated by Kyle Busch. This was his first win in Nashville. The victory made news as Kyle smashed the trophy – a custom painted Gibson guitar – in victory lane.

Top ten finishers
| Pos. | Car # | Driver | Make | Team |
|---|---|---|---|---|
| 1 | 18 | Kyle Busch | Toyota | Joe Gibbs Racing |
| 2 | 88 | Brad Keselowski | Chevrolet | JR Motorsports |
| 3 | 60 | Carl Edwards | Ford | Roush Fenway Racing |
| 4 | 1 | Mike Bliss | Chevrolet | Phoenix Racing |
| 5 | 38 | Jason Leffler | Toyota | Braun Racing |
| 6 | 29 | Stephen Leicht | Chevrolet | Richard Childress Racing |
| 7 | 66 | Steve Wallace | Chevrolet | Rusty Wallace Racing |
| 8 | 47 | Michael McDowell | Toyota | JTG Daugherty Racing |
| 9 | 6 | Erik Darnell (R) | Ford | Roush Fenway Racing |
| 10 | 20 | Brad Coleman | Toyota | Joe Gibbs Racing |

Did not qualify: Justin Hobgood (#41), Daryl Harr (#31).

=== Meijer 300 ===
The Meijer 300 was held June 13 at Kentucky Speedway. Joey Logano took the pole and won the race.

Top ten finishers
| Pos. | Car # | Driver | Make | Team |
|---|---|---|---|---|
| 1 | 20 | Joey Logano | Toyota | Joe Gibbs Racing |
| 2 | 18 | Kyle Busch | Toyota | Joe Gibbs Racing |
| 3 | 88 | Brad Keselowski | Chevrolet | JR Motorsports |
| 4 | 62 | Brendan Gaughan (R) | Chevrolet | Rusty Wallace Racing |
| 5 | 12 | Justin Allgaier (R) | Dodge | Penske Championship Racing |
| 6 | 38 | Jason Leffler | Toyota | Braun Racing |
| 7 | 15 | Michael Annett (R) | Toyota | Germain Racing |
| 8 | 32 | Burney Lamar | Toyota | Braun Racing |
| 9 | 16 | Ricky Stenhouse Jr. | Ford | Roush Fenway Racing |
| 10 | 33 | Kelly Bires | Chevrolet | Kevin Harvick, Inc. |

Did not qualify: Jeff Green (#91), J. C. Stout (#19), Benny Gordon (#72), Blake Bjorklund (#96), Kevin Lepage (#52), Travis Kittleson (#31).

=== NorthernTool.com 250 ===
The NorthernTool.com 250 was held June 20 at Milwaukee Mile. Erik Darnell got his first Nationwide series career pole but Carl Edwards won the race.

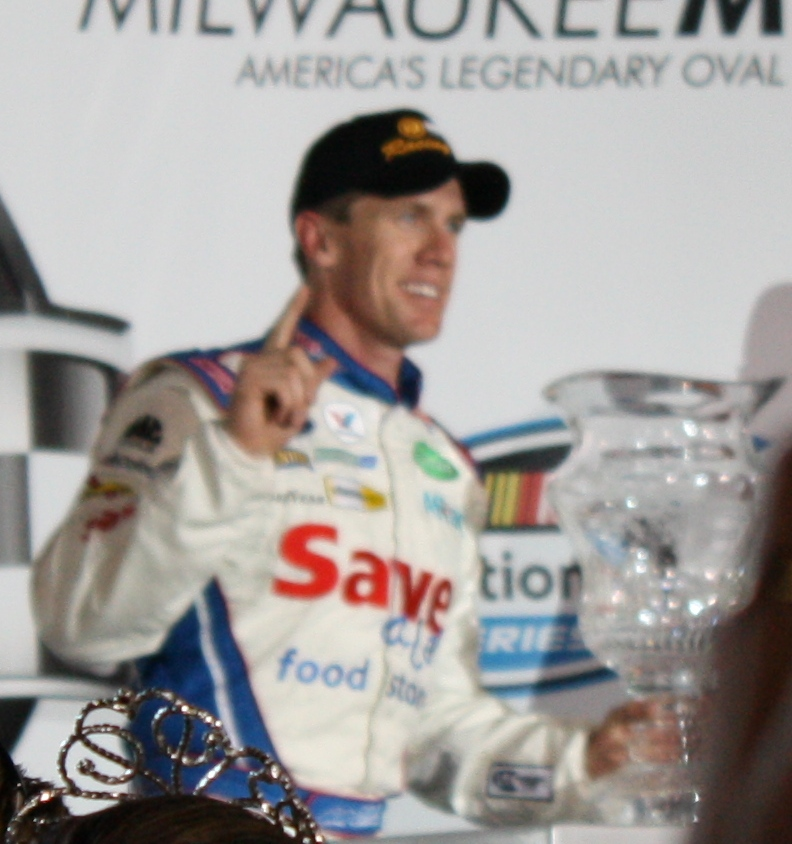
Carl Edwards after winning the 2009 NorthernTool.com

Top ten finishers
| Pos. | Car # | Driver | Make | Team |
|---|---|---|---|---|
| 1 | 60 | Carl Edwards | Ford | Roush Fenway Racing |
| 2 | 18 | Kyle Busch | Toyota | Joe Gibbs Racing |
| 3 | 88 | Brad Keselowski | Chevrolet | JR Motorsports |
| 4 | 6 | Erik Darnell (R) | Ford | Roush Fenway Racing |
| 5 | 16 | Ricky Stenhouse Jr. | Ford | Roush Fenway Racing |
| 6 | 66 | Steve Wallace | Chevrolet | Rusty Wallace Racing |
| 7 | 1 | Mike Bliss | Chevrolet | Phoenix Racing |
| 8 | 29 | Stephen Leicht | Chevrolet | Richard Childress Racing |
| 9 | 33 | Ron Hornaday Jr. | Chevrolet | Kevin Harvick, Inc. |
| 10 | 38 | Jason Leffler | Toyota | Braun Racing |

Did not qualify: Morgan Shepherd (#89), Kevin Lepage (#52), Stanton Barrett (#41), John Wes Townley (#09).

=== Camping World RV Sales 200 presented by Turtle Wax ===
The Camping World RV Sales 200 presented by Turtle Wax was held June 27 at New Hampshire Motor Speedway. Joey Logano won the pole for the third straight race he attempted. Kyle Busch won the race.

Top ten finishers
| Pos. | Car # | Driver | Make | Team |
|---|---|---|---|---|
| 1 | 18 | Kyle Busch | Toyota | Joe Gibbs Racing |
| 2 | 20 | Joey Logano | Toyota | Joe Gibbs Racing |
| 3 | 88 | Brad Keselowski | Chevrolet | JR Motorsports |
| 4 | 1 | Mike Bliss | Chevrolet | Phoenix Racing |
| 5 | 33 | Kevin Harvick | Chevrolet | Kevin Harvick, Inc. |
| 6 | 60 | Carl Edwards | Ford | Roush Fenway Racing |
| 7 | 16 | Greg Biffle | Ford | Roush Fenway Racing |
| 8 | 99 | Scott Speed | Toyota | Michael Waltrip Racing |
| 9 | 6 | Erik Darnell (R) | Ford | Roush Fenway Racing |
| 10 | 38 | Jason Leffler | Toyota | Braun Racing |

Did not qualify: Justin Hobgood (#41), Morgan Shepherd (#89), Kertus Davis (#04), Mike Wallace (#0).

=== Subway Jalapeño 250 ===
The Subway Jalapeño 250 was held July 3 at Daytona International Speedway. Clint Bowyer took the pole and won the race.

Top ten finishers
| Pos. | Car # | Driver | Make | Team |
|---|---|---|---|---|
| 1 | 29 | Clint Bowyer | Chevrolet | Richard Childress Racing |
| 2 | 18 | Kyle Busch | Toyota | Joe Gibbs Racing |
| 6 | 60 | Carl Edwards | Ford | Roush Fenway Racing |
| 4 | 20 | Joey Logano | Toyota | Joe Gibbs Racing |
| 5 | 10 | Kasey Kahne | Toyota | Braun Racing |
| 6 | 88 | Brad Keselowski | Chevrolet | JR Motorsports |
| 7 | 32 | Brian Vickers | Toyota | Braun Racing |
| 8 | 12 | Justin Allgaier (R) | Dodge | Penske Championship Racing |
| 9 | 6 | David Ragan | Ford | Roush Fenway Racing |
| 10 | 33 | Kevin Harvick | Chevrolet | Kevin Harvick, Inc. |

Did not qualify: Terry Cook (#91), Brian Keselowski (#26), Mike Wallace (#0).

=== Dollar General 300 (Chicagoland) ===
The Dollar General 300 was held July 10 at Chicagoland Speedway. Carl Edwards took the pole but Joey Logano won the race.

Top ten finishers
| Pos. | Car # | Driver | Make | Team |
|---|---|---|---|---|
| 1 | 20 | Joey Logano | Toyota | Joe Gibbs Racing |
| 2 | 18 | Kyle Busch | Toyota | Joe Gibbs Racing |
| 3 | 32 | Brian Vickers | Toyota | Braun Racing |
| 4 | 38 | Jason Leffler | Toyota | Braun Racing |
| 5 | 33 | Kevin Harvick | Chevrolet | Kevin Harvick, Inc. |
| 6 | 60 | Carl Edwards | Ford | Roush Fenway Racing |
| 7 | 16 | Greg Biffle | Ford | Roush Fenway Racing |
| 8 | 10 | David Reutimann | Toyota | Braun Racing |
| 9 | 1 | Mike Bliss | Chevrolet | Phoenix Racing |
| 10 | 12 | Justin Allgaier (R) | Dodge | Penske Championship Racing |

Did not qualify: Johnny Chapman (#90), J. C. Stout (#19), Stanton Barrett (#31), Kevin Hamlin (#52), Morgan Shepherd (#89), Brian Keselowski (#96).

=== Missouri-Illinois Dodge Dealers 250 ===
The Missouri-Illinois Dodge Dealers 250 was held July 18 at Gateway International Raceway. Brad Keselowski took the pole but Kyle Busch won the race.

Top ten finishers
| Pos. | Car # | Driver | Make | Team |
|---|---|---|---|---|
| 1 | 18 | Kyle Busch | Toyota | Joe Gibbs Racing |
| 2 | 32 | Reed Sorenson | Toyota | Braun Racing |
| 3 | 60 | Carl Edwards | Ford | Roush Fenway Racing |
| 4 | 1 | Mike Bliss | Chevrolet | Phoenix Racing |
| 5 | 20 | Brad Coleman | Toyota | Joe Gibbs Racing |
| 6 | 29 | Stephen Leicht | Chevrolet | Richard Childress Racing |
| 7 | 15 | Michael Annett (R) | Toyota | Germain Racing |
| 8 | 88 | Brad Keselowski | Chevrolet | JR Motorsports |
| 9 | 27 | Jason Keller | Ford | Baker Curb Racing |
| 10 | 6 | Erik Darnell (R) | Ford | Roush Fenway Racing |

Did not qualify: Morgan Shepherd (#89), Jeff Green (#85), Kertus Davis (#04), Joe Ruttman (#71), Stanton Barrett (#31), Brad Teague (#52).

=== Kroger 200 ===
The Kroger 200 was held July 25 at O'Reilly Raceway Park. Trevor Bayne took the pole but Carl Edwards won the race.

Top ten finishers
| Pos. | Car # | Driver | Make | Team |
|---|---|---|---|---|
| 1 | 60 | Carl Edwards | Ford | Roush Fenway Racing |
| 2 | 18 | Kyle Busch | Toyota | Joe Gibbs Racing |
| 3 | 16 | Matt Kenseth | Ford | Roush Fenway Racing |
| 4 | 88 | Brad Keselowski | Chevrolet | JR Motorsports |
| 5 | 66 | Steve Wallace | Chevrolet | Rusty Wallace, Inc. |
| 6 | 33 | Ron Hornaday Jr. | Chevrolet | Kevin Harvick, Inc. |
| 7 | 99 | Trevor Bayne | Toyota | Michael Waltrip Racing |
| 8 | 38 | Jason Leffler | Toyota | Braun Racing |
| 9 | 5 | Scott Wimmer | Chevrolet | JR Motorsports |
| 10 | 28 | Kenny Wallace | Chevrolet | Jay Robinson Racing |

Did not qualify: Dennis Setzer (#96), Brian Keselowski (#26), Joe Ruttman (#71), John Wes Townley (#09), Mike Wallace (#0).

=== U.S. Cellular 250 ===
The U.S. Cellular 250 was held August 1 and was the inaugural Nationwide series race at Iowa Speedway. Ricky Stenhouse Jr. and Justin Allgaier tied for the pole but Stenhouse started 1st. Brad Keselowski won the race.

Top ten finishers
| Pos. | Car # | Driver | Make | Team |
|---|---|---|---|---|
| 1 | 88 | Brad Keselowski | Chevrolet | JR Motorsports |
| 2 | 18 | Kyle Busch | Toyota | Joe Gibbs Racing |
| 3 | 38 | Jason Leffler | Toyota | Braun Racing |
| 4 | 60 | Carl Edwards | Ford | Roush Fenway Racing |
| 5 | 10 | Kelly Bires | Toyota | Braun Racing |
| 6 | 27 | Jason Keller | Ford | Baker Curb Racing |
| 7 | 28 | Kenny Wallace | Chevrolet | Jay Robinson Racing |
| 8 | 26 | Michael McDowell | Dodge | Whitney Motorsports |
| 9 | 11 | Scott Lagasse Jr. (R) | Toyota | CJM Racing |
| 10 | 29 | Stephen Leicht | Chevrolet | Richard Childress Racing |

Did not qualify: Shelby Howard (#70), Peyton Sellers (#77), Kenny Hendrick (#75), Derrike Cope (#78), Andy Ponstein (#96), Jack Smith (#52), Chris Horn (#58).

=== Zippo 200 ===
The Zippo 200 was held August 8 at Watkins Glen International. Kevin Harvick took the pole but Marcos Ambrose won the race.

Top ten finishers
| Pos. | Car # | Driver | Make | Team |
|---|---|---|---|---|
| 1 | 47 | Marcos Ambrose | Toyota | JTG Daugherty Racing |
| 2 | 18 | Kyle Busch | Toyota | Joe Gibbs Racing |
| 3 | 60 | Carl Edwards | Ford | Roush Fenway Racing |
| 4 | 33 | Kevin Harvick | Chevrolet | Kevin Harvick, Inc. |
| 5 | 5 | Ron Fellows | Chevrolet | JR Motorsports |
| 6 | 29 | Jeff Burton | Chevrolet | Richard Childress Racing |
| 7 | 16 | Greg Biffle | Ford | Roush Fenway Racing |
| 8 | 6 | David Ragan | Ford | Roush Fenway Racing |
| 9 | 88 | Brad Keselowski | Chevrolet | JR Motorsports |
| 10 | 99 | Scott Speed | Toyota | Michael Waltrip Racing |

Did not qualify: Peyton Sellers (#77), Daryl Harr (#31), Brad Baker (#05), Scott Gaylord (#52), Brett Rowe (#75).

=== Carfax 250 ===
The Carfax 250 was held August 15 at Michigan International Speedway. Brian Vickers took the pole but Brad Keselowski won the race.

Top ten finishers
| Pos. | Car # | Driver | Make | Team |
|---|---|---|---|---|
| 1 | 88 | Brad Keselowski | Chevrolet | JR Motorsports |
| 2 | 32 | Brian Vickers | Toyota | Braun Racing |
| 3 | 18 | Kyle Busch | Toyota | Joe Gibbs Racing |
| 4 | 6 | David Ragan | Ford | Roush Fenway Racing |
| 5 | 33 | Kevin Harvick | Chevrolet | Kevin Harvick, Inc. |
| 6 | 5 | Ryan Newman | Chevrolet | JR Motorsports |
| 7 | 12 | Justin Allgaier (R) | Dodge | Penske Championship Racing |
| 8 | 16 | Greg Biffle | Ford | Roush Fenway Racing |
| 9 | 29 | Jeff Burton | Chevrolet | Richard Childress Racing |
| 10 | 98 | Paul Menard | Ford | Yates Racing |

Did not qualify: Kevin Lepage (#73), Jason White (#07), Casey Atwood (#05), Kertus Davis (#0), Derrike Cope (#78), J. C. Stout (#19), Morgan Shepherd (#89), John Wes Townley (#09).

=== Food City 250 ===
The Food City 250 was held August 21 at Bristol Motor Speedway. Brad Keselowski took the pole but David Ragan won the race.

Top ten finishers
| Pos. | Car # | Driver | Make | Team |
|---|---|---|---|---|
| 1 | 6 | David Ragan | Ford | Roush Fenway Racing |
| 2 | 60 | Carl Edwards | Ford | Roush Fenway Racing |
| 3 | 88 | Brad Keselowski | Chevrolet | JR Motorsports |
| 4 | 33 | Kevin Harvick | Chevrolet | Kevin Harvick, Inc. |
| 5 | 16 | Matt Kenseth | Ford | Roush Fenway Racing |
| 6 | 38 | Jason Leffler | Toyota | Braun Racing |
| 7 | 29 | Clint Bowyer | Chevrolet | Richard Childress Racing |
| 8 | 15 | Michael Annett (R) | Toyota | Germain Racing |
| 9 | 98 | Paul Menard | Ford | Yates Racing |
| 10 | 26 | Michael McDowell | Dodge | Whitney Motorsports |

Did not qualify: Dennis Setzer (#96), Kertus Davis (#0), Shelby Howard (#70), Travis Kittleson (#31), Scott Lagasse Jr. (#42), Morgan Shepherd (#89).

=== NAPA Auto Parts 200 presented by Dodge ===
All practice and qualifying was done in the wet using rain tires. The final 16 laps of the race were also run under wet conditions using rain tires. For the third consecutive year, Marcos Ambrose dominated the race, but he blew the final corner by jumping over the curb too high, giving Edwards the win. Ambrose also won the pole.

Top ten finishers
| Pos. | Car # | Driver | Make | Team |
|---|---|---|---|---|
| 1 | 60 | Carl Edwards | Ford | Roush Fenway Racing |
| 2 | 47 | Marcos Ambrose | Toyota | JTG Daugherty Racing |
| 3 | 11 | Andrew Ranger | Toyota | CJM Racing |
| 4 | 32 | Jacques Villeneuve | Toyota | Braun Racing |
| 5 | 88 | Brad Keselowski | Chevrolet | JR Motorsports |
| 6 | 34 | Tony Raines | Chevrolet | Front Row Motorsports |
| 7 | 23 | Jean-François Dumoulin | Chevrolet | R3 Motorsports |
| 8 | 29 | Stephen Leicht | Chevrolet | Richard Childress Racing |
| 9 | 62 | Brendan Gaughan | Chevrolet | Rusty Wallace Racing |
| 10 | 18 | Kyle Busch | Toyota | Joe Gibbs Racing |

Did not qualify: Daryl Harr (#31), Morgan Shepherd (#89).

=== Degree Men V12 300 ===
The Degree Men V12 300 was held September 5 at Atlanta Motor Speedway. Dale Earnhardt Jr. took the pole but Kevin Harvick won the race.

Top ten finishers
| Pos. | Car # | Driver | Make | Team |
|---|---|---|---|---|
| 1 | 33 | Kevin Harvick | Chevrolet | Kevin Harvick, Inc. |
| 2 | 18 | Kyle Busch | Toyota | Joe Gibbs Racing |
| 3 | 5 | Dale Earnhardt Jr. | Chevrolet | JR Motorsports |
| 4 | 88 | Brad Keselowski | Chevrolet | JR Motorsports |
| 5 | 29 | Jeff Burton | Chevrolet | Richard Childress Racing |
| 6 | 20 | Joey Logano | Toyota | Joe Gibbs Racing |
| 7 | 60 | Carl Edwards | Ford | Roush Fenway Racing |
| 8 | 16 | Greg Biffle | Ford | Roush Fenway Racing |
| 9 | 6 | David Ragan | Ford | Roush Fenway Racing |
| 10 | 1 | Reed Sorenson | Chevrolet | Phoenix Racing |

Did not qualify: Derrike Cope (#73), Morgan Shepherd (#89), John Wes Townley (#09), J. C. Stout (#0), Tony Ave (#52).

=== Virginia 529 College Savings 250 ===
The Virginia 529 College Savings 250 was held September 11 at Richmond International Raceway. Denny Hamlin took the pole but Carl Edwards won the race.

Top ten finishers
| Pos. | Car # | Driver | Make | Team |
|---|---|---|---|---|
| 1 | 60 | Carl Edwards | Ford | Roush Fenway Racing |
| 2 | 33 | Kevin Harvick | Chevrolet | Kevin Harvick, Inc. |
| 3 | 18 | Kyle Busch | Toyota | Joe Gibbs Racing |
| 4 | 88 | Brad Keselowski | Chevrolet | JR Motorsports |
| 5 | 32 | David Reutimann | Toyota | Braun Racing |
| 6 | 1 | Martin Truex Jr. | Chevrolet | Phoenix Racing |
| 7 | 11 | Trevor Bayne | Toyota | CJM Racing |
| 8 | 12 | Justin Allgaier (R) | Dodge | Penske Championship Racing |
| 9 | 66 | Steve Wallace | Chevrolet | Rusty Wallace, Inc. |
| 10 | 99 | Scott Speed | Toyota | Michael Waltrip Racing |

Did not qualify: Derrike Cope (#73), Casey Atwood (#05), Morgan Shepherd (#89), Chris Lawson (#52).

=== Dover 200 ===
The Dover 200 was held September 26 at Dover International Speedway. Kyle Busch took the pole but Clint Bowyer won the race.

Top ten finishers
| Pos. | Car # | Driver | Make | Team |
|---|---|---|---|---|
| 1 | 29 | Clint Bowyer | Chevrolet | Richard Childress Racing |
| 2 | 11 | Mike Bliss | Toyota | CJM Racing |
| 3 | 88 | Brad Keselowski | Chevrolet | JR Motorsports |
| 4 | 18 | Kyle Busch | Toyota | Joe Gibbs Racing |
| 5 | 60 | Carl Edwards | Ford | Roush Fenway Racing |
| 6 | 38 | Jason Leffler | Toyota | Braun Racing |
| 7 | 10 | Reed Sorenson | Toyota | Braun Racing |
| 8 | 99 | Scott Speed | Toyota | Michael Waltrip Racing |
| 9 | 32 | David Reutimann | Toyota | Braun Racing |
| 10 | 27 | Jason Keller | Ford | Baker Curb Racing |

Did not qualify: J. C. Stout (#0).

=== Kansas Lottery 300 ===
The Kansas Lottery 300 was held October 3 at Kansas Speedway. Parker Kligerman got his first Nationwide series career pole. Joey Logano won the race.

Top ten finishers
| Pos. | Car # | Driver | Make | Team |
|---|---|---|---|---|
| 1 | 20 | Joey Logano | Toyota | Joe Gibbs Racing |
| 2 | 18 | Kyle Busch | Toyota | Joe Gibbs Racing |
| 3 | 88 | Brad Keselowski | Chevrolet | JR Motorsports |
| 4 | 33 | Kevin Harvick | Chevrolet | Kevin Harvick, Inc. |
| 5 | 16 | Greg Biffle | Ford | Roush Fenway Racing |
| 6 | 12 | Justin Allgaier (R) | Dodge | Penske Championship Racing |
| 7 | 60 | Carl Edwards | Ford | Roush Fenway Racing |
| 8 | 99 | Scott Speed | Toyota | Michael Waltrip Racing |
| 9 | 29 | Clint Bowyer | Chevrolet | Richard Childress Racing |
| 10 | 10 | Reed Sorenson | Toyota | Braun Racing |

Did not qualify: Michael McDowell (#96), Kevin Hamlin (#52), Willie Allen (#92), Derrike Cope (#73), Jennifer Jo Cobb (#79), Morgan Shepherd (#89), Chris Horn (#58), Andy Ponstein (#02).

- Michael McDowell replaced Chase Miller in the #47 car in the race, after failing to qualify his #96.

=== Copart 300 ===
The Copart 300 was held October 10 at Auto Club Speedway. Joey Logano took the pole and won the race.

Top ten finishers
| Pos. | Car # | Driver | Make | Team |
|---|---|---|---|---|
| 1 | 20 | Joey Logano | Toyota | Joe Gibbs Racing |
| 2 | 32 | Brian Vickers | Toyota | Braun Racing |
| 3 | 60 | Carl Edwards | Ford | Roush Fenway Racing |
| 4 | 33 | Kevin Harvick | Chevrolet | Kevin Harvick, Inc. |
| 5 | 88 | Brad Keselowski | Chevrolet | JR Motorsports |
| 6 | 15 | Michael Annett (R) | Toyota | Germain Racing |
| 7 | 62 | Brendan Gaughan (R) | Chevrolet | Rusty Wallace, Inc. |
| 8 | 1 | David Gilliland | Chevrolet | Phoenix Racing |
| 9 | 6 | David Ragan | Ford | Roush Fenway Racing |
| 10 | 27 | Jason Keller | Ford | Baker Curb Racing |

Did not qualify: Stanton Barrett (#31), Jarit Johnson (#44), Casey Atwood (#05).

=== Dollar General 300 (Charlotte) ===
The Dollar General 300 was held October 16 at Lowe's Motor Speedway. Carl Edwards took the pole but Kyle Busch won the race.

Top ten finishers
| Pos. | Car # | Driver | Make | Team |
|---|---|---|---|---|
| 1 | 18 | Kyle Busch | Toyota | Joe Gibbs Racing |
| 2 | 11 | Mike Bliss | Toyota | CJM Racing |
| 3 | 87 | Dave Blaney | Toyota | Braun Racing |
| 4 | 32 | Brian Vickers | Toyota | Braun Racing |
| 5 | 60 | Carl Edwards | Ford | Roush Fenway Racing |
| 6 | 88 | Brad Keselowski | Chevrolet | JR Motorsports |
| 7 | 33 | Ryan Newman | Chevrolet | Kevin Harvick, Inc. |
| 8 | 43 | Kasey Kahne | Toyota | Braun Racing |
| 9 | 29 | Jeff Burton | Chevrolet | Richard Childress Racing |
| 10 | 34 | Tony Raines | Chevrolet | Front Row Motorsports |

Did not qualify: Terry Cook (#91), Kevin Lepage (#78), Casey Atwood (#05), Derrike Cope (#73), Peyton Sellers (#77), Morgan Shepherd (#89).

=== Kroger on Track for the Cure 250 ===
The Kroger on Track for the Cure 250 was held October 24 at Memphis Motorsports Park. Justin Allgaier got his first Nationwide career pole. Kyle Busch nudged Brad Keselowski on the final turn but Keselowski held on and won the race.

Top ten finishers
| Pos. | Car # | Driver | Make | Team |
|---|---|---|---|---|
| 1 | 88 | Brad Keselowski | Chevrolet | JR Motorsports |
| 2 | 18 | Kyle Busch | Toyota | Joe Gibbs Racing |
| 3 | 38 | Jason Leffler | Toyota | Braun Racing |
| 4 | 11 | Mike Bliss | Toyota | CJM Racing |
| 5 | 62 | Brendan Gaughan (R) | Chevrolet | Rusty Wallace Racing |
| 6 | 60 | Carl Edwards | Ford | Roush Fenway Racing |
| 7 | 40 | Scott Wimmer | Chevrolet | Key Motorsports |
| 8 | 99 | David Reutimann | Toyota | Michael Waltrip Racing |
| 9 | 29 | Stephen Leicht | Chevrolet | Richard Childress Racing |
| 10 | 1 | Landon Cassill | Chevrolet | Phoenix Racing |
Shelby Howard suffered 25 point penalty for unapproved adjustments on his car.

Did not qualify: Johnny Chapman (#90), Todd Kluever (#42), Kevin Lepage (#78), Nick Joanides (#31), Mark Green (#49), Jarit Johnson (#44), Brad Teague (#52).

=== O'Reilly Challenge ===
The O'Reilly Challenge was held November 7 at Texas Motor Speedway. Matt Kenseth took the pole but Kyle Busch won the race.

Top ten finishers
| Pos. | Car # | Driver | Make | Team |
|---|---|---|---|---|
| 1 | 18 | Kyle Busch | Toyota | Joe Gibbs Racing |
| 2 | 29 | Casey Mears | Chevrolet | Richard Childress Racing |
| 3 | 38 | Jason Leffler | Toyota | Braun Racing |
| 4 | 16 | Matt Kenseth | Ford | Roush Fenway Racing |
| 5 | 88 | Brad Keselowski | Chevrolet | JR Motorsports |
| 6 | 33 | Kevin Harvick | Chevrolet | Kevin Harvick, Inc. |
| 7 | 32 | Brian Vickers | Toyota | Braun Racing |
| 8 | 6 | David Ragan | Ford | Roush Fenway Racing |
| 9 | 60 | Carl Edwards | Ford | Roush Fenway Racing |
| 10 | 11 | Mike Bliss | Toyota | CJM Racing |
Kyle Busch finished 1st
He suffered a 25-point penalty for an unapproved adjustment found on his car.

Did not qualify: Casey Atwood (#85), Mike Harmon (#84), Andy Ponstein (#02).

=== Able Body Labor 200 ===
The Able Body Labor 200 was held November 14 at Phoenix International Raceway. Denny Hamlin won the pole with a new track record. Carl Edwards won the race.

Top ten finishers
| Pos. | Car # | Driver | Make | Team |
|---|---|---|---|---|
| 1 | 60 | Carl Edwards | Ford | Roush Fenway Racing |
| 2 | 33 | Kevin Harvick | Chevrolet | Kevin Harvick, Inc. |
| 3 | 32 | Jason Leffler | Toyota | Braun Racing |
| 4 | 29 | Clint Bowyer | Chevrolet | Richard Childress Racing |
| 5 | 88 | Brad Keselowski | Chevrolet | JR Motorsports |
| 6 | 6 | David Ragan | Ford | Roush Fenway Racing |
| 7 | 16 | Matt Kenseth | Ford | Roush Fenway Racing |
| 8 | 11 | Mike Bliss | Toyota | CJM Racing |
| 9 | 18 | Kyle Busch | Toyota | Joe Gibbs Racing |
| 10 | 66 | Steve Wallace | Chevrolet | Rusty Wallace Racing |

Did not qualify: Chris Lawson (#52), Blake Koch (#05), Morgan Shepherd (#89), Daryl Harr (#31).

=== Ford 300 ===
The Ford 300 was held November 21 at Homestead–Miami Speedway. Carl Edwards won the pole. Kyle Busch won the race and the championship. Denny Hamlin also spun Brad Keselowski earlier in the race.

Top ten finishers
| Pos. | Car # | Driver | Make | Team |
|---|---|---|---|---|
| 1 | 18 | Kyle Busch | Toyota | Joe Gibbs Racing |
| 2 | 60 | Carl Edwards | Ford | Roush Fenway Racing |
| 3 | 29 | Jeff Burton | Chevrolet | Richard Childress Racing |
| 4 | 20 | Joey Logano | Toyota | Joe Gibbs Racing |
| 5 | 11 | Denny Hamlin | Toyota | CJM Racing |
| 6 | 32 | David Reutimann | Toyota | Braun Racing |
| 7 | 33 | Ryan Newman | Chevrolet | Kevin Harvick, Inc. |
| 8 | 66 | Steve Wallace | Toyota | Rusty Wallace Racing |
| 9 | 99 | Scott Speed | Toyota | Michael Waltrip Racing |
| 10 | 16 | Matt Kenseth | Ford | Roush Fenway Racing |

Did not qualify: Jeremy Clements (#0), Chase Austin (#58), Johnny Borneman, III (#83), Parker Kligerman (#22), Morgan Shepherd (#89), Eddie MacDonald (#39), Jennifer Jo Cobb (#84), Brian Keselowski (#96), Benny Gordon (#72).

- Parker Kligerman replaced Todd Bodine in the #42 car in the race, after failing to qualify his #22.

== Final standings ==
=== Full Drivers' Championship ===
(key) Bold – Pole position awarded by time. Italics – Pole position set by owner's points. * – Most laps led.

| Pos | Driver | DAY | CAL | LVS | BRI | TEX | NSH | PHO | TAL | RCH | DAR | CLT | DOV | NSH | KEN | MIL | NHA | DAY | CHI | GTY | IRP | IOW | GLN | MCH | BRI | CGV | ATL | RCH | DOV | KAN | CAL | CLT | MEM | TEX | PHO | HOM | Pts |
|---|---|---|---|---|---|---|---|---|---|---|---|---|---|---|---|---|---|---|---|---|---|---|---|---|---|---|---|---|---|---|---|---|---|---|---|---|---|
| 1 | Kyle Busch | 4 | 1* | 39 | 6* | **1*** | 2 | 10 | 10* | 1* | 16* | 3* | 17* | **1*** | 2* | 2* | 1 | 2 | 2 | 1 | 2 | 2 | 2 | 3 | 28 | 10 | 2 | 3 | **4*** | 2* | 31* | 1* | 2 | 1* | 9 | 1* | 5682 |
| 2 | Carl Edwards | 2 | **4** | 2 | 2 | 18 | **5** | **33** | 13 | 2 | 3 | **10** | 5 | 3 | 20 | 1 | 6 | 3 | **6** | 3 | 1* | 4 | 3 | 40 | 2 | 1 | 7 | 1 | 5 | 7 | 3 | **5** | 6 | 9 | 1* | **2** | 5472 |
| 3 | Brad Keselowski | 22 | 27 | 27 | 12 | 3 | 3 | 3 | 9 | 4 | 11 | 8 | 1 | 2 | 3 | 3 | 3 | 6 | 18 | **8** | 4 | 1* | 9 | 1 | **3** | 5 | 4 | 4 | 3 | 3 | 5 | 6 | 1 | 5 | 5 | 12 | 5364 |
| 4 | Jason Leffler | 33 | 11 | 4 | 10 | 13 | 6 | 2 | 6 | 10 | 2 | 6 | 8 | 5 | 6 | 10 | 10 | 19 | 4 | 14 | 8 | 3 | 15 | 11 | 6 | 29 | 20 | 32 | 6 | 11 | 30 | 32 | 3 | 3 | 27 | 18 | 4540 |
| 5 | Mike Bliss | 28 | 13 | 22 | 35 | 7 | 8 | 9 | 41 | 33 | 7 | 1 | 14 | 4 | 28 | 7 | 4 | 29 | 9 | 4 | 33 | 14 | 43 | 27 | 15 | 34 | 34 | 16 | 2 | 21 | 13 | 2 | 4* | 10 | 8 | 16 | 4075 |
| 6 | Justin Allgaier **(R)** | 40 | 14 | 8 | 5 | 10 | 29 | 8 | 32 | 38 | 5 | 14 | 10 | 13 | 5 | 17 | 13 | 8 | 10 | 11 | 21 | 15 | 17 | 7 | 27 | 36 | 17 | 8 | 25 | 6 | 16 | 12 | **19** | 25 | 16 | 20 | 4049 |
| 7 | Steve Wallace | 42 | 10 | 30 | 7 | 14 | 9 | 12 | 34 | 11 | 14 | 17 | 29 | 7 | 14 | 6 | 11 | 12 | 16 | 24 | 5 | 17 | 12 | 15 | 17 | 16 | 23 | 9 | 12 | 15 | 29 | 31 | 20 | 21 | 10 | 8 | 4007 |
| 8 | Jason Keller | 9 | 17 | 25 | 28 | 15 | 12 | 17 | 7 | 9 | 15 | 16 | 9 | 26 | 23 | 20 | 23 | 22 | 19 | 9 | 25 | 6 | 16 | 20 | 16 | 23 | 37 | 15 | 10 | 13 | 10 | 17 | 28 | 12 | 11 | 13 | 3960 |
| 9 | Brendan Gaughan **(R)** | 15 | 9 | 7 | **21** | 37 | 17 | 7 | 38 | 26 | 19 | 2 | 12 | 24 | 4 | 13 | 21 | 17 | 13 | 31 | 12 | 25 | 22 | 29 | 19 | 9 | 31 | 21 | 19 | 29 | 7 | 15 | 5 | 16 | 19 | 11 | 3914 |
| 10 | Michael Annett **(R)** | 35 | 16 | 32 | 20 | 11 | 19 | 16 | 21 | 34 | 29 | 39 | 19 | 27 | 7 | 28 | 19 | 35 | 17 | 7 | 35 | 11 | 20 | 13 | 8 | 18 | 14 | 25 | 13 | 30 | 6 | 13 | 16 | 22 | 20 | 21 | 3598 |
| 11 | Kenny Wallace | 16 | 31 | 14 | 14 | 21 | 24 | 29 | 17 | 23 | 18 | 18 | 33 | 16 | 37 | 33 | 20 | 16 | 27 | 29 | 10 | 7 | 19 | 22 | 14 | 17 | 27 | 26 | 20 | 20 | 24 | 21 | 13 | 17 | 17 | 17 | 3569 |
| 12 | Tony Raines | 31 | 21 | 15 | 32 | 22 | 27 | 24 | 4 | 15 | 21 | 26 | 28 | 19 | 21 | 21 | 30 | 23 | 23 | 12 | 15 | 18 | 28 | 33 | 23 | 6 | 24 | 22 | 15 | 23 | 20 | 10 | 18 | 15 | 21 | 23 | 3548 |
| 13 | Michael McDowell **(R)** | 14 | 36 | 6 | 31 | 17 | 15 | 11 | 15 | 8 | 33 | 20 | 11 | 8 | 29 | 14 | 15 | 13 | 25 | 32 | 28 | 8 | 27 | 17 | 10 | 11 | 35 | 19 | 29 | 39 | 38 | 23 | 21 | 29 | 25 | | 3449 |
| 14 | Joey Logano | 20 | 3 | | 9 | 12 | 1* | 4 | 3 | 6 | 12 | 5 | 2 | | **1** | | **2*** | 4 | 1* | | | | 33 | | | | 6 | | | 1 | **1** | 14 | | 24 | | 4 | 3371 |
| 15 | Kevin Harvick | **11** | 2 | 29 | 1 | | | 5 | | 5 | | 23 | 17 | | | | 5 | 10 | 5 | 17* | | 30 | **4** | 5 | 4* | | 1* | 2 | | 4 | 4 | | | 6 | 2 | | 3248 |
| 16 | Scott Wimmer | 32 | DNQ | 11 | 22 | DNQ | 28 | 19 | DNQ | 16 | 9 | 28 | 18 | 33 | 16 | 18 | 17 | 21 | 15 | 15 | 9 | 31 | | 35 | 21 | | 18 | 18 | 14 | 12 | 21 | 25 | 7 | 14 | 15 | 19 | 3177 |
| 17 | Eric McClure | 26 | 30 | 16 | 26 | 34 | 26 | 22 | 25 | 39 | 28 | 19 | 23 | 22 | 30 | 32 | 33 | 28 | 31 | 23 | 23 | 20 | 30 | 28 | 25 | 22 | 26 | 29 | 24 | 25 | 28 | 18 | 30 | 19 | 28 | 28 | 2962 |
| 18 | David Ragan | 8 | 5 | 26 | 19 | 4 | 7 | 6 | 1 | | | 7 | 30 | | | | | 9 | 34 | | | | 8 | 4 | 1 | | 9 | | | | 9 | | | 8 | 6 | | 2632 |
| 19 | Danny O'Quinn Jr. | 23 | 33 | 18 | 37 | 29 | 32 | 21 | 37 | 20 | 27 | 24 | 21 | 18 | 18 | 27 | 26 | 30 | 29 | 18 | 34 | 24 | 25 | 31 | 32 | | | | 34 | 43 | 34 | 37 | 42 | 35 | 35 | 35 | 2404 |
| 20 | Brian Vickers | 6 | 8 | 3 | | | | | 20 | | 10 | 4 | 4 | | | | 12 | 7 | 3 | | | | 37 | **2*** | | | 13 | | | 28 | 2 | 4 | | 7 | | | 2403 |
| 21 | Scott Lagasse Jr. **(R)** | 43 | 12 | 9 | 13 | 16 | 10 | 32 | 8 | 17 | 22 | 32 | 27 | 11 | 13 | 16 | 16 | 18 | 20 | 33 | 37 | 9 | | | DNQ | | | | | | | | | | | | 2194 |
| 22 | Matt Kenseth | 10 | | | 4 | 6 | | | 35 | **3** | 1 | | | | | | | 14 | | | 3 | | | | 5 | | | | 11 | | | 33 | 11 | **4** | 7 | 10 | 1992 |
| 23 | John Wes Townley **(R)** | 21 | 22 | 38 | 16 | 36 | 18 | 36 | 18 | DNQ | 34 | DNQ | 38 | 42 | 32 | DNQ | 28 | 36 | 21 | 21 | DNQ | 29 | | DNQ | 33 | | DNQ | | 18 | 31 | 17 | 28 | 40 | 18 | 23 | 24 | 1989 |
| 24 | Greg Biffle | 5 | 34 | 1* | | | | 1* | | | | 12 | 25 | | | | 7 | | 7 | | | | 7 | 8 | | | 8 | 12 | | 5 | 14 | | | | | | 1966 |
| 25 | Paul Menard | | | | 11 | 5 | | 14 | | | DNQ | 21 | 6 | | | | 35 | | 14 | | | | 29 | 10 | 9 | 15 | 12 | 13 | | | 11 | | | | 30 | 14 | 1876 |
| 26 | Erik Darnell **(R)** | | | | | | | | | 12 | 4 | | | 9 | 11 | **4** | 9 | | | 10 | 29 | 23 | | | | 12 | | 14 | 17 | 18 | | 34 | 31 | | | 31 | 1837 |
| 27 | David Reutimann | 12 | 7 | | | 9 | | | 29 | | | | | | | | | | 8 | | 11 | | | 14 | 11 | | | 5 | 9 | | | 20 | 8 | | 18 | 6 | 1807 |
| 28 | Jeff Burton | | 6 | 10 | | 8 | | 20 | | 31 | 8 | 9 | | | | | | | 11 | | | | 6 | 9 | | | 5 | | | | | 9 | | | | 3 | 1775 |
| 29 | Clint Bowyer | 3* | | | 3 | | | | 31 | | | | 3 | | | | 14 | **1*** | | | | | | | 7 | | | 11 | 1 | 9 | 26 | | | | 4 | | 1750 |
| 30 | Morgan Shepherd | 39 | 19 | 13 | 34 | 28 | 31 | 35 | 23 | 36 | 31 | DNQ | 22 | 17 | 25 | DNQ | DNQ | 32 | DNQ | DNQ | 17 | 19 | 21 | DNQ | DNQ | DNQ | DNQ | DNQ | 21 | DNQ | 33 | DNQ | 34 | 32 | DNQ | DNQ | 1742 |
| 31 | Joe Nemechek | 13 | 35 | 20 | 18 | 39 | 34 | 25 | 11 | 18 | 32 | 36 | | | | | 27 | 24 | 24 | | | | 26 | | | | | 36 | 35 | 35 | 37 | | | 36 | 36 | 36 | 1692 |
| 32 | Trevor Bayne | | | | 23 | | | | | | | | | 28 | 12 | 12 | | | 12 | 27 | **7** | 26 | | 30 | 24 | | 26 | 7 | | | 19 | | QL | 13 | 14 | | 1648 |
| 33 | Shelby Howard | | | | | 32 | 14 | | 27 | 13 | | | | 12 | 26 | 23 | | | 26 | 13 | 19 | DNQ | | 18 | DNQ | | 21 | 35 | | 26 | | | 12 | 31 | | 33 | 1603 |
| 34 | Scott Speed | | | **40** | 8 | | | | | 27 | 13 | 11 | 7 | | | | 8 | | | | | | 10 | | | | | 10 | 8 | 8 | 27 | | | | | 9 | 1591 |
| 35 | Mike Wallace | 19 | | | | | | | 39 | | | | | | | | DNQ | DNQ | 38 | 22 | DNQ | | 39 | 34 | | 19 | 19 | 24 | 22 | 17 | 15 | 30 | 15 | 28 | 22 | 15 | 1535 |
| 36 | Mark Green | 18 | | | DNQ | | DNQ | 38 | 43 | 40 | 39 | 41 | 39 | 43 | 19 | 35 | 36 | 39 | 43 | 35 | 43 | 38 | 38 | 36 | 38 | 33 | 40 | 38 | 42 | 38 | 35 | 38 | DNQ | 43 | 34 | 26 | 1498 |
| 37 | Brian Keselowski | 25 | 29 | 19 | DNQ | 38 | 41 | 27 | 14 | 21 | 24 | 30 | 16 | 30 | 35 | 31 | 34 | DNQ | DNQ | 20 | DNQ | | | | | 42 | 33 | | | | | | QL | | | DNQ | 1412 |
| 38 | Ken Butler III **(R)** | | 20 | 17 | | | 37 | 28 | | 35 | | | 37 | | 17 | 26 | 25 | | | 25 | 31 | 33 | QL | | 22 | | | | 23 | | | 35 | | | 32 | 27 | 1361 |
| 39 | Matt Carter | | | | | | | | | | | | | | | | 24 | 15 | 32 | 19 | 30 | 21 | 36 | 26 | 12 | | 25 | 33 | 26 | 27 | 25 | 29 | | | | | 1305 |
| 40 | Brandon Whitt | 37 | 23 | 24 | 24 | 23 | 30 | 26 | 30 | 30 | 25 | 29 | 20 | 20 | 24 | 30 | | | | | | | | | | | | | | | | | | | | | 1260 |
| 41 | Robert Richardson Jr. | 34 | | 34 | 29 | 24 | | | 16 | | | 33 | | 21 | | | | 26 | 28 | | | | | 24 | | | 22 | 28 | | 22 | | | 32 | 26 | | | 1248 |
| 42 | Ryan Newman | | | | | | | | **2** | | 6 | | 32 | | | | | | 22 | | | | 35 | 6 | 13 | | | | 30 | | | 7 | | | | 7 | 1191 |
| 43 | Stephen Leicht | | | | | | 11 | | | | | | | 6 | 31 | 8 | | | | 6 | 13 | 10 | | | | 8 | | | | | | | 9 | | | | 1185 |
| 44 | Casey Atwood | | 40 | 35 | 25 | 27 | 22 | 31 | | 25 | 43 | DNQ | 43 | 40 | | 25 | 40 | | 37 | 34 | | 35 | | DNQ | 41 | | 38 | DNQ | 36 | 36 | DNQ | DNQ | QL | DNQ | 41 | | 1178 |
| 45 | Kevin Conway | | | | | | | | | | | | 24 | 23 | 15 | | | | | 28 | 20 | | | | | | | | | 24 | 18 | 24 | 27 | 20 | 24 | 22 | 1149 |
| 46 | Johnny Chapman | DNQ | 39 | 42 | 41 | 43 | 43 | | DNQ | 43 | 42 | 42 | 40 | 38 | 39 | 43 | 43 | 43 | DNQ | 39 | 41 | 42 | | 39 | 43 | | 42 | 42 | 40 | 42 | 42 | 43 | DNQ | 40 | 40 | 42 | 1090 |
| 47 | Reed Sorenson | | | | | | | | | | | | | | | | | | | 2 | | | | 12 | 35 | | 10 | | 7 | 10 | | 16 | | | 3 | | 1059 |
| 48 | Kelly Bires | | | 37 | 42 | | 4 | | | | | | | 37 | 10 | 36 | 41 | | 40 | 40 | 39 | 5 | | | | | 32 | | | | | | 25 | | | 29 | 1053 |
| 49 | Burney Lamar | | | | 15 | 35 | 13 | 13 | | 28 | | 22 | | 15 | 8 | 22 | | | | | | | | | | | | | | | | | | | | | 957 |
| 50 | Jeremy Clements | | | | | | 39 | | | | | 27 | | | | | | | 35 | 16 | | QL | | 25 | | | 36 | | | 32 | 12 | 22 | 29 | 33 | 29 | DNQ | 951 |
| 51 | Dale Earnhardt Jr. | 7 | | 5 | | 20 | | | 5 | | | 13 | | | | | | 40 | | | | | | | | | **3** | | | | | | | | | | 901 |
| 52 | Brad Coleman | | | | | | | | | | | | | 10 | | 24 | | | | 5 | 16 | 13 | | 23 | 29 | 28 | | | | | | | | | | | 873 |
| 53 | Bobby Hamilton Jr. | | | | | | | | | | | | 15 | 14 | 27 | 19 | 29 | | | | 22 | | | | | | 30 | 23 | 28 | | | | | | | | 846 |
| 54 | Terry Cook **(R)** | DNQ | 37 | 41 | 40 | 42 | 42 | 42 | | 41 | 41 | 40 | 41 | | | 39 | | DNQ | 41 | | 40 | | | 38 | 42 | | | | | 41 | 41 | DNQ | | 41 | 39 | 40 | 833 |
| 55 | David Green | 30 | 18 | 31 | 17 | 30 | 38 | 18 | 24 | 14 | | | | | | | | | | | | | | | | | | | | | | | | | | | 807 |
| 56 | Kenny Hendrick | 41 | 26 | 12 | 30 | 25 | 35 | DNQ | 42 | DNQ | 36 | | | | 34 | | | | | | | DNQ | | | | | | | | | | | 37 | 37 | | 38 | 777 |
| 57 | Dennis Setzer | | 42 | 43 | 38 | QL | 20 | DNQ | | | DNQ | 38 | 42 | | | 41 | | | 30 | | DNQ | | | 42 | DNQ | | | 34 | 38 | | 36 | 42 | | 42 | 42 | 41 | 775 |
| 58 | Peyton Sellers **(R)** | | | | | 26 | | | | 19 | | 31 | 31 | | | 15 | | | | | 26 | DNQ | DNQ | | 31 | | 28 | | | 33 | | DNQ | | | | | 747 |
| 59 | Kertus Davis | 38 | 25 | DNQ | DNQ | DNQ | 40 | 39 | 22 | 42 | 40 | DNQ | 36 | 35 | | 42 | DNQ | 33 | 42 | DNQ | 42 | 37 | | DNQ | DNQ | | | | | | | | | | | | 743 |
| 60 | Denny Hamlin | | | 21 | | | | | | | | | | | | | | | | | | | 34 | 32 | | | | **17*** | 27 | | | | | | **12** | 5 | 729 |
| 61 | Kevin Lepage | | | | 36 | 33 | | | | | 35 | DNQ | 35 | 34 | DNQ | DNQ | 39 | | 39 | 37 | | 39 | | DNQ | 40 | | 41 | 43 | | 40 | 40 | DNQ | DNQ | | | | 689 |
| 62 | Ricky Stenhouse Jr. | | | | | | 23 | | | | | | | 32 | 9 | 5 | | | | 30 | QL | **23** | | 19 | | | | | | | | 40 | QL | | | | 677 |
| 63 | David Gilliland | | | | | | | | | | | 15 | | | | | | 27 | | | | | | | | | 15 | | | 19 | 8 | 19 | | | | | 672 |
| 64 | Brian Scott | | | | | | 25 | 15 | | 32 | 20 | | | | | | | | | | | | | | 30 | | | | | 14 | 23 | | | | | | 664 |
| 65 | Michael Waltrip | 24 | 15 | | | 19 | 16 | 40 | 40 | | | | | | | | | 11 | | | | | | | | | | | | | | | | | | | 661 |
| 66 | D. J. Kennington | 17 | 24 | 33 | | | | 23 | 19 | 24 | | | | | | | | | | | | | | | | 32 | | | | | | | | | | | 625 |
| 67 | Derrike Cope | DNQ | 43 | DNQ | Wth | Wth | | | | 22 | DNQ | 34 | | | 22 | 40 | 37 | | 36 | 38 | | DNQ | | DNQ | 26 | | DNQ | DNQ | | DNQ | 39 | DNQ | | | | | 619 |
| 68 | Mike Harmon | 29 | DNQ | DNQ | DNQ | DNQ | DNQ | DNQ | DNQ | DNQ | 37 | DNQ | 26 | 39 | 33 | 34 | | 31 | 33 | 26 | | 43 | | | | | | | | | | | | DNQ | | | 612 |
| 69 | Johnny Borneman III | DNQ | DNQ | DNQ | | | | 30 | 26 | | | | | | | | | 25 | | | | 16 | | | | | | | | | 22 | | | 34 | 26 | DNQ | 604 |
| 70 | Kevin Hamlin | | | | 33 | 31 | | 41 | | DNQ | 26 | 35 | | | 36 | | | | DNQ | 43 | | QL | | 41 | | | | | 43 | DNQ | 38 | 36 | | | 37 | 43 | 589 |
| 71 | Kasey Kahne | | | | | | | | | | | | | | | | | 5 | | | | | | | 37 | | 11 | | | | | 8 | | 30 | | | 562 |
| 72 | Tony Stewart | 1 | | | | 2 | | | | | | | | | | | | | | | | | | | | | | | | | | 11 | | | | | 500 |
| 73 | Jeff Green | 27 | | Wth | | | 21 | | 36 | | 23 | | | | DNQ | | | 34 | | DNQ | 24 | | | | | | | | | | | | | | | | 483 |
| 74 | Chase Miller | | | | | | | | | | | | | | | | | | | 42 | | 40 | | 37 | | | 39 | | 39 | QL | 37 | 41 | 39 | 39 | | 37 | 442 |
| 75 | Benny Gordon | | | | DNQ | | 36 | | | 37 | | | | | DNQ | | 31 | | | | | 12 | | | 18 | | | 30 | | | | | | | | DNQ | 436 |
| 76 | Aric Almirola | | | | | | | | | | | | | | | 11 | | | | | 14 | 34 | | | | | | | | | | 27 | | | | | 394 |
| 77 | Marcos Ambrose | | | | | | | | | | | | | | | | | | | | | | 1* | | | **2*** | | | | | | | | | | | 375 |
| 78 | Justin Marks | | | | | | | | | | | | | | | | | | | | | | 32 | | | 30 | | 31 | | | | | 24 | | | 32 | 368 |
| 79 | Dave Blaney | | | | | | | 43 | | | | | | | | | | | | | | | 13 | | | | 43 | | | | | 3 | | | | | 357 |
| 80 | Austin Dillon | | | | | | | 34 | | | | | | | | | | | | | 18 | 28 | | 19 | | | | | | | | | | | | | 355 |
| 81 | Travis Kittleson | | | | | | | | | DNQ | 38 | | | | DNQ | 29 | 38 | | | | 27 | | | | DNQ | | | 27 | | | | | | | | | 338 |
| 82 | Stanton Barrett | DNQ | 28 | 28 | DNQ | | | | | | | 25 | | | 43 | DNQ | | | DNQ | DNQ | | | | | | 24 | | | | | DNQ | | | | | | 337 |
| 83 | Marc Davis | | | | 27 | | | | | 29 | | DNQ | 34 | 25 | | | | | | | | | | | | | | | | | | | | | | | 307 |
| 84 | Ron Hornaday Jr. | | | | | | | | | | | | | | | 9 | | | | | 6 | | | | | | | | | | | | | | | | 293 |
| 85 | Tim Andrews | | | | | | 33 | | | | | | | | | | | | | | | | | | | | | | 31 | | | 26 | | | | 30 | 292 |
| 86 | Andy Ponstein | | DNQ | 23 | 39 | 41 | DNQ | DNQ | | | | | | | | | | | | | | DNQ | | | | | | | 37 | DNQ | | 39 | 36 | DNQ | | | 287 |
| 87 | Sean Murphy | | | | | | | | | | | | | | | | | | | | | 27 | 23 | | 20 | | | | | | | | | | | | 279 |
| 88 | Martin Truex Jr. | | | | | | | | | | | | | | | | | | | | | | | | | | | 6 | 16 | | | | | | | | 265 |
| 89 | Chase Austin | | | | | | | | | | | | | | | | | 37 | | | 32 | | | | 36 | | 29 | | | | | | | | | DNQ | 255 |
| 90 | James Buescher | | | | | | | | | | | | | | | | | | | | | | | | | | | | | | | | | 11 | 13 | | 254 |
| 91 | J. C. Stout | | 38 | | | 40 | | | | | | 37 | | | DNQ | 37 | | | DNQ | | | | | DNQ | | | DNQ | 40 | DNQ | | | | | | | | 239 |
| 92 | Boris Said | | | | | | | | | | | | | | | | | | | | | | 11 | | | 25 | | | | | | | | | | | 218 |
| 93 | Coleman Pressley | | | | | | | | | | | | | | | | | | | | | 41 | | | 39 | | | 41 | 41 | | | | 38 | | | | 215 |
| 94 | Ron Fellows | | | | | | | | | | | | | | | | | | | | | | 5 | | | 35 | | | | | | | | | | | 213 |
| 95 | Parker Kligerman | | | | | | | | | | | | | | | | | | | | | | | | | | | | | **16** | | | | | | 25 | 208 |
| 96 | Willie Allen | | | | | | | | | | | | | 36 | | | 42 | | | 41 | | | | 43 | | | | | | DNQ | | | 43 | | | | 200 |
| 97 | Josh Wise | | | | | DNQ | | | | | | | | | | | | | | | | | | | | | | 37 | | | | | | 27 | 33 | | 198 |
| 98 | J. R. Fitzpatrick | | | | | | | | | | | | | | | | | | | | | | 18 | | | 27 | | | | | | | | | | | 191 |
| 99 | Chad Blount | | | | | | | | | | | | | | 42 | 38 | | | | 36 | 38 | | | | | | | | | | | | | | | | 190 |
| 100 | Jeff Fuller | | | | | | | | | | 30 | | | | | | | | | | | 36 | | | | | | | | | | | 35 | | | | 186 |
| 101 | Kerry Earnhardt | | | | | DNQ | | | 12 | | | | | | | | | 38 | | | | | | | | | | | | | | | | | | | 176 |
| 102 | Blake Koch | | | | | | | | | | | | | | | | | | | | | | | | | | | | | | | | 17 | | DNQ | 34 | 173 |
| 103 | Donnie Neuenberger | 36 | | | | | | | 28 | | | | | | | | | 42 | | | | | | | | | | | | | | | | | | | 171 |
| 104 | Casey Mears | | | | | | | | | | | | | | | | | | | | | | | | | | | | | | | | | 2 | | | 170 |
| 105 | Andrew Ranger | | | | | | | | | | | | | | | | | | | | | | | | | 3 | | | | | | | | | | | 170 |
| 106 | Bobby Gerhart | | | | | | | | 33 | | | | | | | | | 20 | | | | | | | | | | | | | | | | | | | 167 |
| 107 | Jacques Villeneuve | | | | | | | | | | | | | | | | | | | | | | | | | 4 | | | | | | | | | | | 165 |
| 108 | Patrick Carpentier | | | | | | | | | | 17 | | | | | | | | | | | | | | | 38 | | | | | | | | | | | 161 |
| 109 | Jeffrey Earnhardt | | | | | | | | | | | | DNQ | | | | | | | | | | 24 | | | 31 | | | | | | | | | | | 161 |
| 110 | Mark Day | | | | | | | | | | | | | | | | | | | | | | | | | | | | | | | | 33 | 38 | | 39 | 159 |
| 111 | Brian Ickler | | | | | | | | | | | | | | | | | | | | QL | 32 | | | | | | | | | | | 26 | | | | 152 |
| 112 | Mark Martin | | | | | | | | | 7 | | | | | | | | | | | | | | | | | | | | | | | | | | | 146 |
| 113 | Jean-François Dumoulin | | | | | | | | | | | | | | | | | | | | | | | | | 7 | | | | | | | | | | | 146 |
| 114 | Chris Cook | | | | | | | | | | | | | | | | | | | | | | 31 | | | 41 | | | | | | | | | 43 | | 144 |
| 115 | Landon Cassill | | | | | | | | | | | | | | | | | | | | | | | | | | | | | | | | 10 | | | | 134 |
| 116 | Alex Tagliani | | | | | | | | | | | | | | | | | | | | | | | | | 26 | | | | | | | | | 38 | | 134 |
| 117 | Brad Teague | | | | DNQ | | DNQ | | | | | | | | | | | | | DNQ | | | | | 34 | | | | 32 | | | | DNQ | | | | 128 |
| 118 | Justin Hobgood | | | | | | | | DNQ | | DNQ | | | DNQ | 41 | | DNQ | | | | | | | | | | | 39 | | | | | 41 | | | | 126 |
| 119 | Jarit Johnson | | | | | | | | | | | | | | | | | | | | | | | | | | | | 33 | 34 | DNQ | | DNQ | | | | 125 |
| 120 | Antonio Pérez | | | | | | | | | | | | | | | | | | | | | | 40 | | | 13 | | | | | | | | | | | 124 |
| 121 | Scott Gaylord | | 32 | 36 | | | | | | | | | | | | | | | | | | | DNQ | | | | | | | | | | | | | | 122 |
| 122 | Robby Gordon | | | | | | | | | | | | | | | | | | | | | | 14 | | | | | | | | | | | | | | 121 |
| 123 | Victor Gonzalez Jr. | | | | | | | | | | | | | | | | | | | | | | | | | 14 | | | | | | | | | | | 121 |
| 124 | Matt DiBenedetto | | | | | | | | | | | | | | | | | | | | | | | | | | | | | | | | 14 | | | | 121 |
| 125 | Justin Lofton | | | | | | | | | | | | | | | | | | | | | | | 16 | | | | | | | | | | | | | 115 |
| 126 | Elliott Sadler | | | | | | | | | | | | | | | | 18 | | | | | | | | | | | | | | | | | | | | 109 |
| 127 | Max Papis | | | | | | | | | | | | | | | | | | | | | | | | | 20 | | | | | | | | | | | 103 |
| 128 | Travis Kvapil | | | | | | | | | | | | | | | | | | | | | | | | | | | 20 | | | | | | | | | 103 |
| 129 | Brett Rowe | | | | | | | | | | | | | | | | | | | | | | DNQ | | | 21 | | | | | | | | | | | 100 |
| 130 | J. J. Yeley | | | | | | | | | | | | | | | | | | | | | | | 21 | | | | | | | | | | | | | 100 |
| 131 | Sean Caisse | | | | | | | | | | | | | 29 | | | 22 | | | | | | | | | | | | | | | | | | | | 97 |
| 132 | Eddie MacDonald | | | | | | | | | | | | | | | | | | | | | | | | | | | | | | | | 22 | | | DNQ | 97 |
| 133 | Richard Boswell | | | | | | | | | | | | | | | | | | | | | | | | | | | | | | | | 23 | | | | 94 |
| 134 | Bobby Hillin Jr. | | | | | | | | | | | | | | | | | | | | | | | | | | | | | | | | | 23 | | | 94 |
| 135 | Patrick Sheltra | | | | | | | | | | | | | | | | | 41 | | | | | | | | | | | | 37 | | | | | | | 92 |
| 136 | Brad Baker | | | | | | | | | | | | | 41 | 40 | | | | | | | | DNQ | | | | | | | | | | | | | | 83 |
| 137 | Tom Hubert | | | | | | | | | | | | | | | | | | | | | | 41 | | | 43 | | | | | | | | | | | 74 |
| 138 | Cale Gale | | | | | | | | | | | | | 31 | | | | | | | | QL | | | | | | | | | | | | | | | 70 |
| 139 | Jason Bowles | | | | | | | | | | | | | | | | | | | | | | | | | | | | | | | | | | 31 | | 70 |
| 140 | Chase Mattioli | | | | | | | | | | | | | | | | 32 | | | | | | | | | | | | | | | | | | | | 67 |
| 141 | Chris Lawson | | | | | | | | | | | | | | | | | | | | 36 | | | | | | | DNQ | | | | | | | DNQ | | 55 |
| 142 | Daryl Harr | | | | | | | 37 | | | | | | DNQ | | | | | | | | | DNQ | | | DNQ | | | | | | | | | DNQ | | 52 |
| 143 | Andy Lally | | | | | | | | | | | | | | | | | | | | | | | | | 37 | | | | | | | | | | | 52 |
| 144 | Chris Horn | | | | | | | | | | | | | | 38 | | | | | | | DNQ | | | | | | | | DNQ | | | | | | | 49 |
| 145 | Tony Ave | | | | | | | | | | | | | | | | | | | | | | | | | 39 | DNQ | | | | | | | | | | 46 |
| 146 | Colin Braun | | | | | | | | | | | | | | | QL | | | | | QL | | | | | 40 | | | | | | | | | | | 43 |
| 147 | Justin Ashburn | Wth | 41 | | | | | | | | | | | | | | | | | | | | | | | | | | | | | | | | | | 40 |
| 148 | Kris Szekeres | | | | | | | | | | | | | | | | | | | | | | 42 | | | | | | | | | | | | | | 37 |
| 149 | Steve Grissom | | | | 43 | | | | | | | | | | | | | | | | | | | | | | | | | | | | | | | | 34 |
| 150 | Donny Lia | | | | | | | | | | | 43 | | | | | | | | | | | | | | | | | | | | | | | | | 34 |
| 151 | Larry Foyt | DNQ | | | | | | | | | | | | | | | | | | | | | | | | | | | | | | | | | | | |
| 152 | Ryan Hackett | | | | | | DNQ | | | | | | | | | | | | | | | | | | | | | | | | | | | | | | |
| 153 | Blake Bjorklund | | | | | | | | | | | | | | DNQ | | | | | | | | | | | | | | | | | | | | | | |
| 154 | Joe Ruttman | | | | Wth | | | | | | | | | | | | | | | DNQ | DNQ | | | | | | | | | | | | | | | | |
| 155 | Jack Smith | | | | | | | | | | | | | | | | | | | | | DNQ | | | | | | | | | | | | | | | |
| 156 | Jason White | | | | | | | | | | | | | | | | | | | | | | | DNQ | | | | | | | | | | | | | |
| 157 | Jennifer Jo Cobb | | | | | | | | | | | | | | | | | | | | | | | | | | | | | DNQ | | | | | | DNQ | |
| 158 | Todd Kluever | | | | | | | | | | | | | | | | | | | | | | | | | | | | | | | | DNQ | | | | |
| 159 | Nick Joanides | | | | | | | | | | | | | | | | | | | | | | | | | | | | | | | | DNQ | | | | |
| 160 | Brandon Knupp | | | | | | | | | | | Wth | | | | | | | | | | | | | | | | | | | | | | | | | |
| 161 | Johnny Sauter | | | | | | | | | | | | | | | QL | | | | | QL | | | | | | | | | | | | | | | | |
| 162 | Auggie Vidovich | | | | | | | | | | | | | | | | | | | | | QL | | | | | | | | | | | QL | | | | |
| 163 | Todd Bodine | | | | | | | | | | | | | | | | | | | | | | | | | | | | | | | | | | | QL | |
| Pos | Driver | DAY | CAL | LVS | BRI | TEX | NSH | PHO | TAL | RCH | DAR | CLT | DOV | NSH | KEN | MIL | NHA | DAY | CHI | GTY | IRP | IOW | GLN | MCH | BRI | CGV | ATL | RCH | DOV | KAN | CAL | CLT | MEM | TEX | PHO | HOM | Pts |

== See also ==
- 2009 NASCAR Sprint Cup Series
- 2009 NASCAR Camping World Truck Series
- 2009 NASCAR Camping World East Series
- 2009 NASCAR Camping World West Series
- 2009 ARCA Re/Max Series
- 2009 NASCAR Whelen Modified Tour
- 2009 NASCAR Whelen Southern Modified Tour
- 2009 NASCAR Corona Series
- 2009 NASCAR Mini Stock Series
- 2009 NASCAR Canadian Tire Series
