= Travis Kittleson =

American stock car racing driver

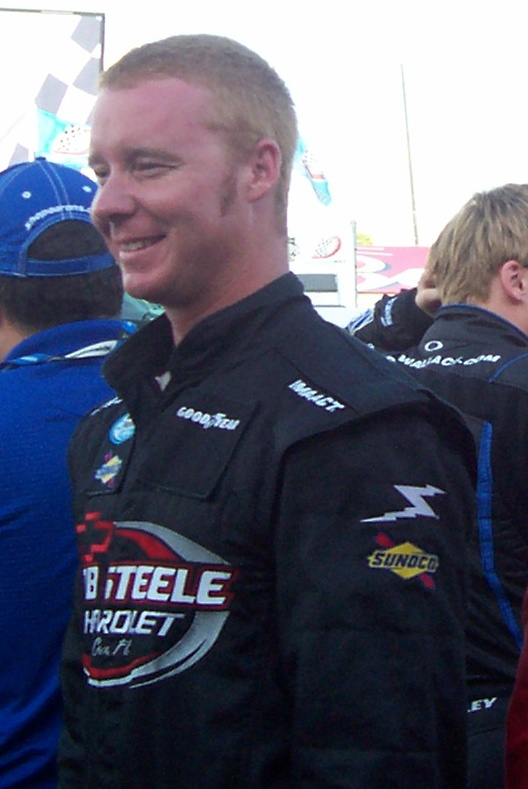
- Kittleson at Milwaukee in 2009.
- Born: December 21, 1979 (age 46); Merritt Island, Florida, U.S.

NASCAR O'Reilly Auto Parts Series career
- 11 races run over 5 years
- 2009 position: 81st
- Best finish: 81st (2009)
- First race: 2004 Sam's Town 250 (Memphis)
- Last race: 2009 Virginia 529 College Savings 250 (Richmond)
Wins	Top tens	Poles
0	0	0

NASCAR FedEx Freight Truck Series career
- 8 races run over 2 years
- Best finish: 55th (2006)
- First race: 2006 Toyota Tundra 200 (Nashville)
- Last race: 2007 Chevy Silverado 350K (Texas)
Wins	Top tens	Poles
0	0	0

Travis Kittleson (born December 21, 1979) is an American former stock car racing driver from Merritt Island, Florida. Kittleson competed in 11 NASCAR Busch Series races between 2004 and 2009. He also competed in eight NASCAR Craftsman Truck Series events between 2007 and 2008. Kittleson also competed in the X-1R Pro Cup Series and the ASA National Tour.

== Racing career ==
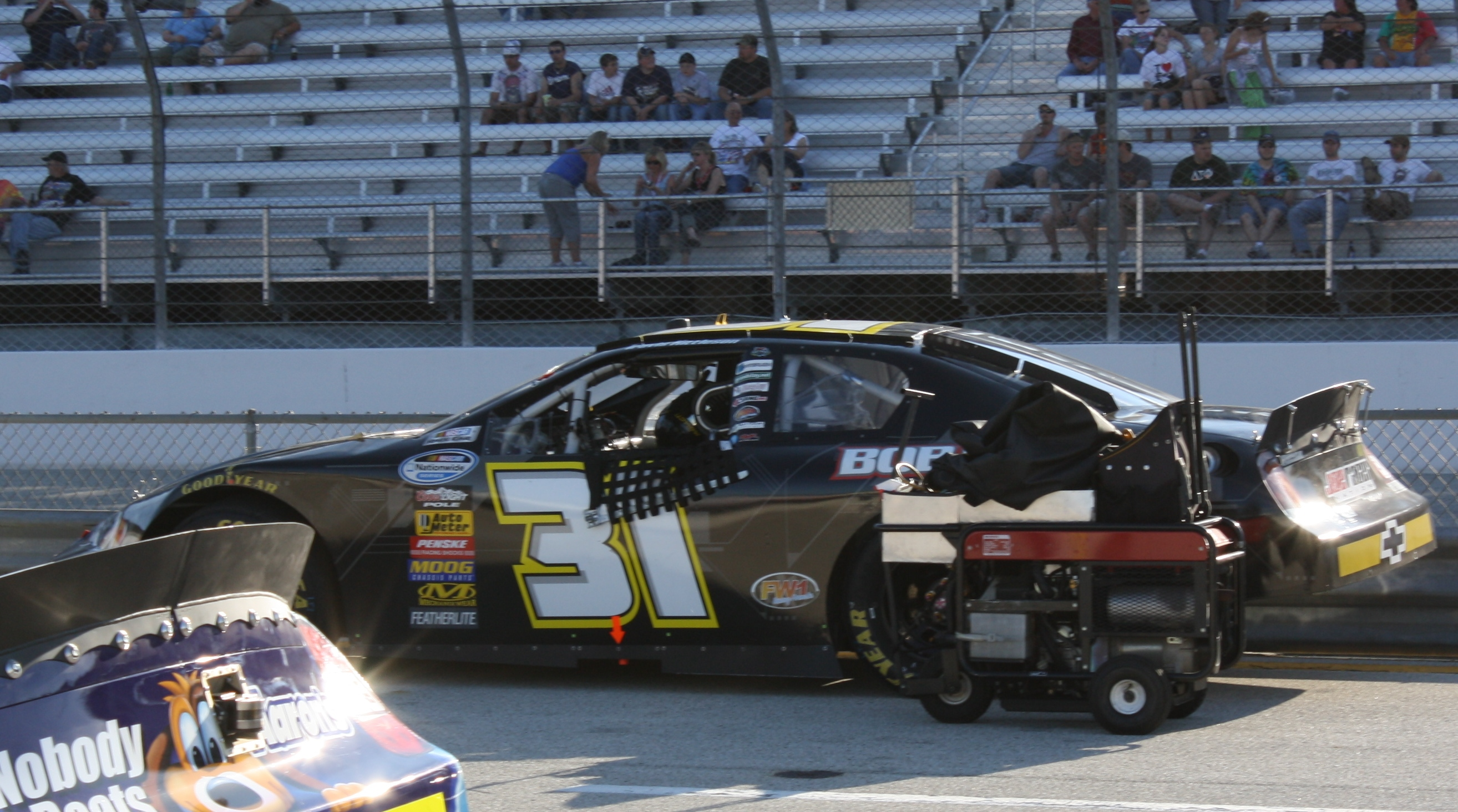
Kittleson's car at the Milwaukee Mile in 2009.

Kittleson's first two Busch Series starts came with his family R/T Racing team. He also tested with Dale Earnhardt, Inc.'s Busch Series team in 2004.

== Motorsports career results ==
=== NASCAR ===
(key) (Bold – Pole position awarded by qualifying time. Italics – Pole position earned by points standings or practice time. * – Most laps led.)

==== Nationwide Series ====
NASCAR Nationwide Series results
Year	Team	No.	Make	1	2	3	4	5	6	7	8	9	10	11	12	13	14	15	16	17	18	19	20	21	22	23	24	25	26	27	28	29	30	31	32	33	34	35	NNSC	Pts	Ref
2004	R/T Racing	68	Chevy	DAY	CAR	LVS	DAR	BRI	TEX	NSH	TAL	CAL	GTY	RCH	NZH	CLT	DOV	NSH	KEN	MLW	DAY	CHI	NHA	PPR	IRP	MCH	BRI	CAL	RCH	DOV	KAN	CLT	MEM; 25	ATL	PHO	DAR	HOM		123rd	88	
2005	R/T Racing	68	Chevy	DAY	CAL	MXC	LVS	ATL	NSH	BRI	TEX	PHO	TAL	DAR	RCH	CLT	DOV	NSH; DNQ	KEN	MLW	DAY	CHI	NHA	PPR	GTY	IRP	GLN	MCH	BRI	CAL	RCH	DOV	KAN	CLT	MEM; 26	TEX	PHO	HOM; DNQ	117th	85	
2007	Joe Gibbs Racing	20	Chevy	DAY	CAL	MXC	LVS	ATL	BRI	NSH	TEX	PHO	TAL	RCH	DAR	CLT	DOV	NSH	KEN	MLW	NHA	DAY	CHI	GTY; 17	IRP	CGV	GLN	MCH	BRI	CAL	RCH	DOV	KAN						124th	112	
2007	Brian Carter Racing	61	Chevy																															CLT; DNQ	MEM	TEX	PHO	HOM	124th	112	
2008	Mac Hill Motorsports	56	Chevy	DAY	CAL	LVS	ATL	BRI	NSH	TEX	PHO	MXC	TAL	RCH	DAR	CLT	DOV	NSH; 25	KEN	MLW; 31	NHA	DAY	CHI	GTY	IRP; 33	CGV	GLN	MCH	BRI	CAL	RCH	DOV	KAN	CLT	MEM; DNQ	TEX	PHO	HOM	88th	222	
2009	Rick Ware Racing	31	Chevy	DAY	CAL	LVS	BRI	TEX	NSH	PHO	TAL	RCH; DNQ	DAR; 38	CLT	DOV	NSH	KEN; DNQ	MLW; 29	NHA; 38	DAY	CHI	GTY	IRP; 27	IOW	GLN	MCH	BRI; DNQ	CGV	ATL	RCH; 27	DOV	KAN	CAL	CLT	MEM	TEX	PHO	HOM	81st	338	

==== Craftsman Truck Series ====
NASCAR Craftsman Truck Series results
Year	Team	No.	Make	1	2	3	4	5	6	7	8	9	10	11	12	13	14	15	16	17	18	19	20	21	22	23	24	25	NCTC	Pts	Ref
2006	Green Light Racing	07	Chevy	DAY	CAL	ATL	MAR	KAN	CLT	MFD	DOV	TEX	MCH	MLW	MEM	KEN	IRP	NSH; 16	BRI; 30	GTW	NHA	LVS; 31	TAL	MAR	ATL	TEX	PHO	HOM	55th	263	
2007	Morgan-Dollar Motorsports	46	Chevy	DAY	CAL	ATL	MAR	KAN; 36	CLT	MFD	DOV	TEX	MCH; 28	MLW	MEM	KEN	IRP												61st	268	
2007	Xpress Motorsports	19	Ford															NSH; 36	BRI	GTW	NHA	LVS	TAL	MAR					61st	268	
2007	Green Light Racing	08	Chevy																						ATL; 28	TEX; 36	PHO	HOM	61st	268	
