= Stan Silva Jr. =

American racing driver (born 1965)

- Born: October 26, 1965 (age 61); Castroville, California, U.S.

NASCAR O'Reilly Auto Parts Series career
- 1 race run over 1 year
- Best finish: 143rd (2008)
- First race: 2008 Zippo 200 at the Glen (Watkins Glen)
Wins	Top tens	Poles
0	0	0

ARCA Menards Series East career
- 1 race run over 1 year
- Best finish: 68th (2008)
- First race: 2008 East 125 at the Glen (Watkins Glen)
Wins	Top tens	Poles
0	0	0

ARCA Menards Series West career
- 30 races run over 7 years
- Best finish: 16th (2007)
- First race: 2006 King Taco 200 (Irwindale)
- Last race: 2012 Pick-N-Pull Racing To Stop Hunger 200 (Sonoma)
Wins	Top tens	Poles
0	7	0
- Statistics up to date as of November 25, 2024.

Stan Silva Jr. (born October 26, 1965) is an American former professional stock car racing driver who has competed in the NASCAR Nationwide Series, the NASCAR K&N Pro Series East and the NASCAR K&N Pro Series West.

Silva Jr. has also previously competed in the NASCAR Midwest Series, the NASCAR Northwest Series, and the NASCAR Southwest Series.

== Motorsports results ==
=== NASCAR ===
(key) (Bold - Pole position awarded by qualifying time. Italics - Pole position earned by points standings or practice time. * – Most laps led.)

==== Nationwide Series ====
NASCAR Nationwide Series results
Year	Team	No.	Make	1	2	3	4	5	6	7	8	9	10	11	12	13	14	15	16	17	18	19	20	21	22	23	24	25	26	27	28	29	30	31	32	33	34	35	NNSC	Pts	Ref
2005	Silva Motorsports	65	Chevy	DAY	CAL	MXC; DNQ	LVS	ATL	NSH	BRI	TEX	PHO	TAL	DAR	RCH	CLT	DOV	NSH	KEN	MLW	DAY	CHI	NHA	PPR	GTY	IRP	GLN; DNQ	MCH	BRI	CAL	RCH	DOV	KAN	CLT	MEM	TEX	PHO	HOM	N/A	0	
2006	Silva Motorsports	65	Chevy	DAY	CAL	MXC; DNQ	LVS	ATL	BRI	TEX	NSH	PHO	TAL	RCH	DAR	CLT	DOV	NSH	KEN	MLW	DAY	CHI	NHA	MAR	GTY	IRP	GLN; DNQ	MCH	BRI	CAL	RCH	DOV	KAN	CLT	MEM	TEX	PHO	HOM	N/A	0	
2008	Silva Motorsports	65	Chevy	DAY	CAL	LVS	ATL	BRI	NSH	TEX	PHO	MXC	TAL	RCH	DAR	CLT	DOV	NSH	KEN	MLW	NHA	DAY	CHI	GTY	IRP	CGV	GLN; 39	MCH	BRI	CAL	RCH	DOV	KAN	CLT	MEM	TEX	PHO; DNQ	HOM	143rd	46	

==== Camping World East Series ====
NASCAR Camping World East Series results
Year	Team	No.	Make	1	2	3	4	5	6	7	8	9	10	11	12	13	NCWESC	Pts	Ref
2007	Silva Motorsports	65	Chevy	GRE	ELK; DNQ	IOW; DNQ	SBO	STA	NHA	TMP	NSH	ADI	LRP	MFD	NHA	DOV	N/A	0	
2008	Silva Motorsports	65	Chevy	GRE	IOW	SBO	GLN; 19	NHA	TMP	NSH	ADI	LRP	MFD	NHA	DOV	STA	68th	106	

==== K&N Pro Series West ====
NASCAR K&N Pro Series West results
Year	Team	No.	Make	1	2	3	4	5	6	7	8	9	10	11	12	13	14	15	NKNPSWC	Pts	Ref
2006	Silva Motorsports	65	Chevy	PHO	PHO; DNQ	S99	IRW; 13	SON; 8	DCS	IRW; 26	EVG	S99	CAL; 19	CTS	AMP				19th	484	
2007	Silva Motorsports	65	Chevy	CTS; 22	PHO; 15	AMP; 16	ELK; DNQ	IOW; DNQ	CNS; 13	SON; 8	DCS; 17	IRW; 15	MMP; 21	EVG	CSR	AMP			16th	979	
2008	Hollis Thackery	38	Ford	AAS	PHO; 33	CTS													33rd	303	
2008	Silva Motorsports	65	Chevy				IOW; 14	CNS	SON; 15	IRW	DCS	EVG	MMP	IRW	AMP	AAS			33rd	303	
2009	Silva Motorsports	65	Chevy	CTS	AAS	PHO	MAD	IOW	DCS	SON; 9	IRW	PIR; 10	MMP	CNS	IOW	AAS			34th	272	
2010	Silva Motorsports	65	Chevy	AAS	PHO; 7	IOW; 7	DCS	SON; 25	IRW; 27	PIR; 7	MRP	CNS	MMP; 14	AAS	PHO; 37				19th	781	
2011	Silva Motorsports	65	Chevy	PHO; 30	AAS; 16	MMP; 21	IOW	LVS; 10	SON; 22	IRW	EVG	PIR	CNS	MRP	SPO	AAS	PHO		26th	519	
2012	Silva Motorsports	65	Chevy	PHO	LHC	MMP	S99	IOW	BIR	LVS	SON; 16	EVG	CNS	IOW	PIR	SMP	AAS	PHO	70th	28	
