= Brett Rowe =

American racing driver

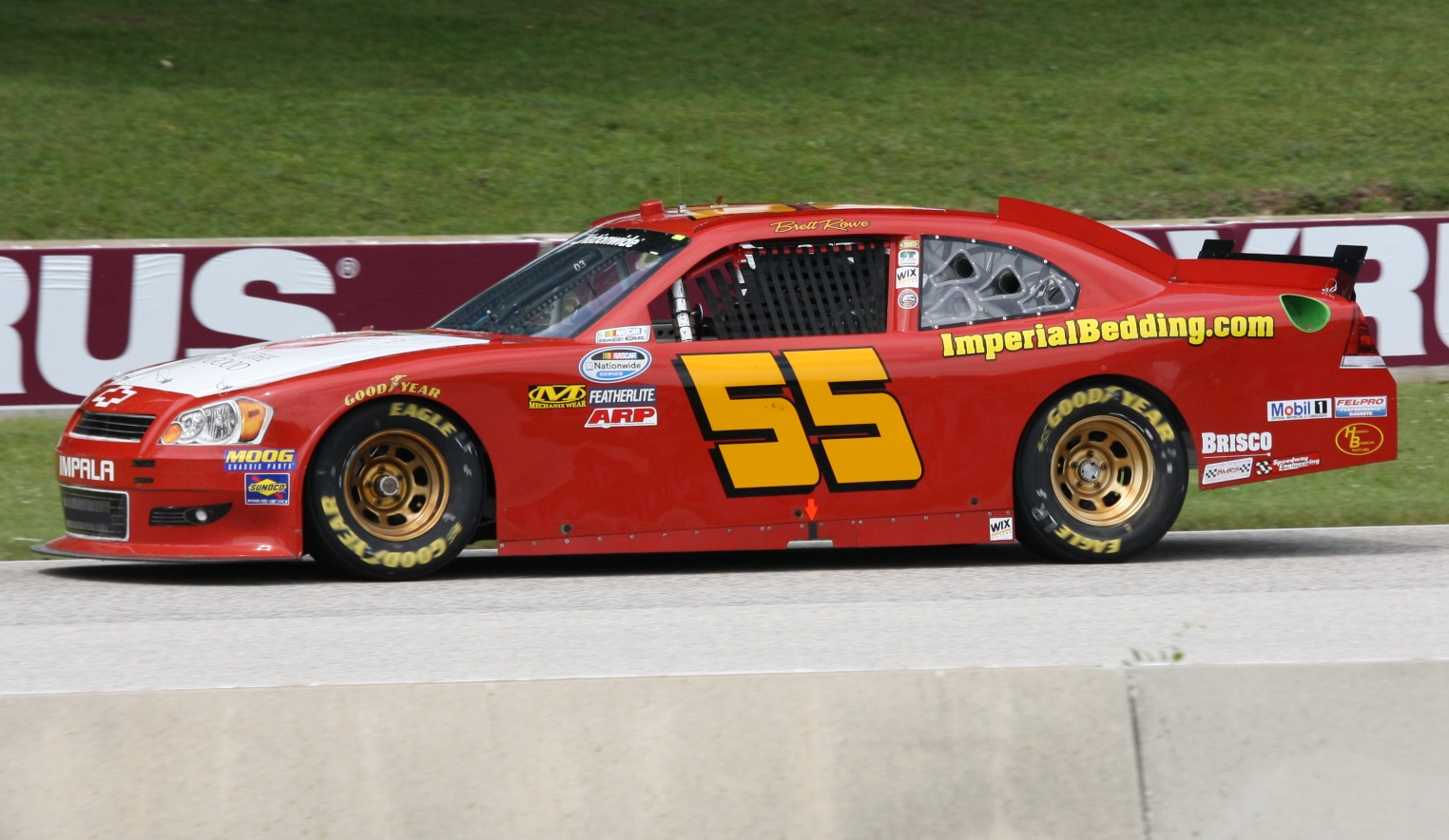
- 2011 car at Road America
- Born: May 6, 1967 (age 59); Barboursville, West Virginia, U.S.
- Achievements: 2005 ARCA Lincoln Welders Truck Series champion

NASCAR O'Reilly Auto Parts Series career
- 30 races run over 6 years
- 2011 position: 69th
- Best finish: 58th (2008)
- First race: 2007 Sam's Town 300 (Las Vegas)
- Last race: 2011 Bucyrus 200 (Road America)
Wins	Top tens	Poles
0	0	0

Brett Rowe (born May 6, 1967) is an American professional stock car racing driver. He last competed part-time in the NASCAR Nationwide Series, driving the No. 55 for Shepherd Racing Ventures.

== Racing career ==
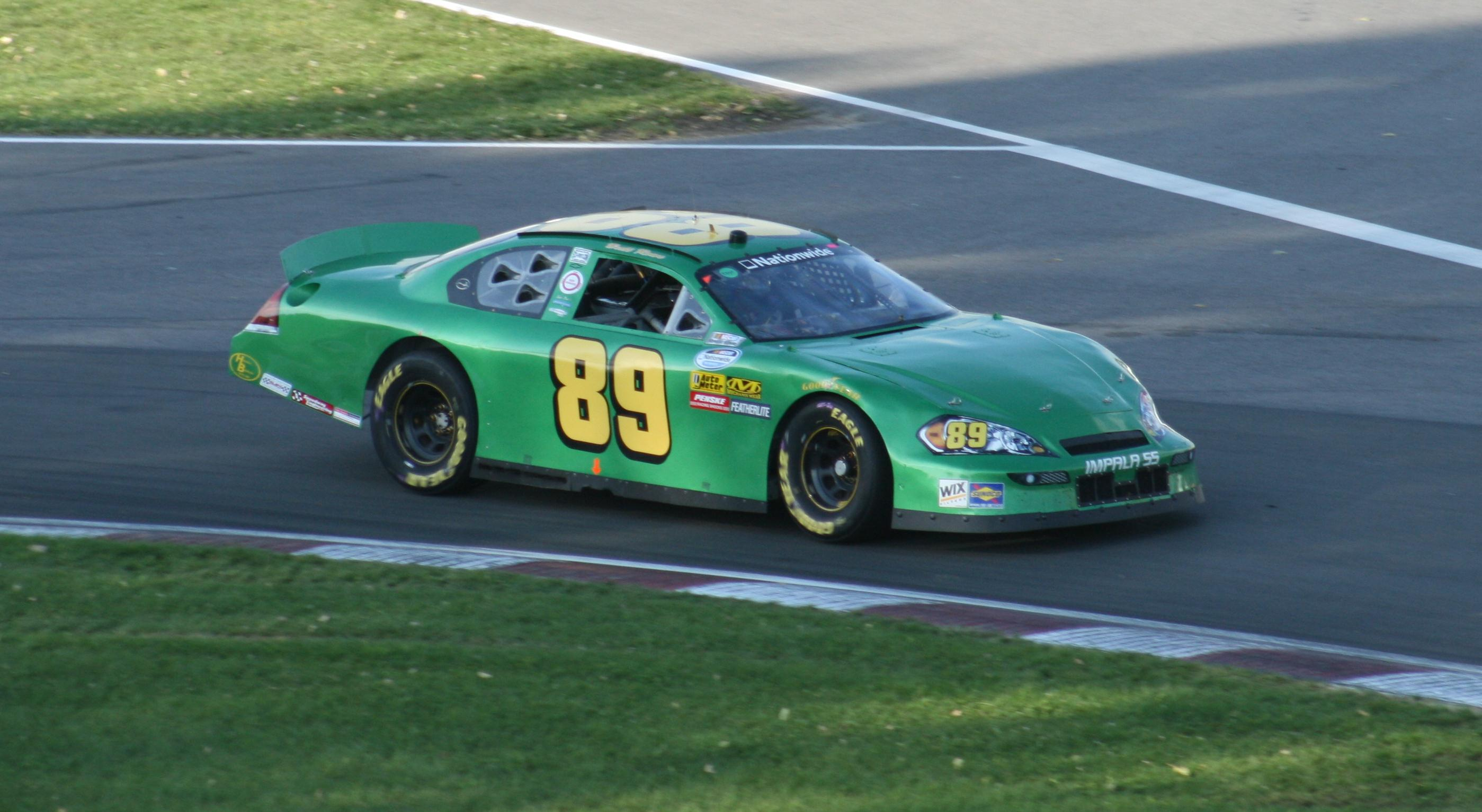
2010 car at Circuit Gilles Villeneuve

During the early 2000s, Rowe raced in the ARCA Lincoln Welders Truck Series for his Front Rowe Racing team. In 2005, he won the series championship.

Rowe began competing in the Busch Series, later renamed the Nationwide Series, in 2007. In 2009, Rowe joined Herd Racing, driving the No. 75 car; the team name and number were tributes to the victims of the 1970 Marshall University plane crash. Herd's sister team Faith Motorsports, owned by Morgan Shepherd, fielded a Nationwide ride for Rowe in 2011 as Herd owner Dana Tomes did not own a Nationwide Series Car of Tomorrow.

== Personal life ==
Rowe's brother Brian has also raced in the ARCA Truck Series.

== Motorsports career results ==
=== NASCAR ===
(key) (Bold – Pole position awarded by qualifying time. Italics – Pole position earned by points standings or practice time. * – Most laps led.)

==== Nationwide Series ====
NASCAR Nationwide Series results
Year	Team	No.	Make	1	2	3	4	5	6	7	8	9	10	11	12	13	14	15	16	17	18	19	20	21	22	23	24	25	26	27	28	29	30	31	32	33	34	35	NXSC	Pts	Ref
2006	Day Enterprises	05	Chevy	DAY	CAL	MXC	LVS	ATL	BRI	TEX	NSH	PHO	TAL	RCH	DAR	CLT	DOV	NSH	KEN	MLW	DAY	CHI	NHA	MAR	GTY	IRP	GLN	MCH	BRI	CAL	RCH	DOV	KAN	CLT	MEM; DNQ	TEX	PHO	HOM; DNQ	NA	-	
2007	Kinney Racing	85	Chevy	DAY	CAL	MXC	LVS; 43	ATL	BRI																														70th	524	
2007	Front Rowe Racing	73	Ford							NSH; 22				RCH; 40	DAR	CLT	DOV																						70th	524	
2007	Day Enterprises	05	Chevy								TEX; 40	PHO	TAL						KEN; 39	MLW	NHA	DAY	CHI	GTY; 21	IRP; 37	CGV	GLN	MCH	BRI	CAL	RCH	DOV	KAN	CLT		TEX; DNQ	PHO	HOM	70th	524	
2007	Front Rowe Racing	73	Chevy															NSH; 39																					70th	524	
2007	Day Enterprises	05	Ford																																MEM; 22				70th	524	
2008	Day Enterprises	05	Chevy	DAY; DNQ	CAL; 35	LVS; 21	ATL; 36	BRI; 28	NSH; 43	TEX; 38	PHO; 42	MXC; DNQ	TAL; 27	RCH; 36	DAR; DNQ	CLT; DNQ	DOV; 33	NSH; DNQ	KEN	MLW	NHA	DAY	CHI	GTY	IRP; 40	CGV	GLN	MCH	BRI	CAL	RCH	DOV	KAN	CLT	MEM	TEX	PHO	HOM	58th	656	
2009	Herd Racing	75	Chevy	DAY	CAL	LVS	BRI	TEX	NSH	PHO	TAL	RCH	DAR	CLT	DOV	NSH	KEN	MLW	NHA	DAY	CHI	GTY	IRP	IOW	GLN; DNQ	MCH	BRI	CGV; 21	ATL	RCH	DOV	KAN	CAL	CLT	MEM	TEX	PHO	HOM	129th	100	
2010	Herd Racing	75	Dodge	DAY; DNQ	CAL	LVS	BRI																																145th	40	
2010	Herd Racing	75	Chevy					NSH; DNQ	PHO	TEX	TAL	RCH	DAR	DOV	CLT	NSH	KEN	ROA	NHA	DAY	CHI	GTY	IRP	IOW	GLN	MCH	BRI												145th	40	
2010	Faith Motorsports	89	Chevy																									CGV; 41	ATL	RCH	DOV	KAN	CAL	CLT	GTY	TEX	PHO; DNQ	HOM	145th	40	
2011	Faith Motorsports	55	Chevy	DAY; DNQ	PHO; 39	LVS; 36	BRI; 40	CAL; 42	TEX; DNQ	TAL	NSH	RCH	DAR	DOV; 40	IOW; 43	CLT	CHI; 42	MCH; DNQ	ROA; 42	DAY	KEN	NHA					CGV; DNQ	BRI	ATL	RCH	CHI	DOV	KAN	CLT	TEX	PHO	HOM		69th	28	
2011	Key Motorsports	46	Chevy																				NSH; DNQ	IRP	IOW	GLN													69th	28	

=== ARCA Re/Max Series ===
(key) (Bold – Pole position awarded by qualifying time. Italics – Pole position earned by points standings or practice time. * – Most laps led.)

ARCA Re/Max Series results
Year	Team	No.	Make	1	2	3	4	5	6	7	8	9	10	11	12	13	14	15	16	17	18	19	20	21	22	23	ARMC	Pts	Ref
2006	Day Enterprises	90	Chevy	DAY; 14	NSH; 28	SLM; 23	**WIN**; 8	KEN; 22	TOL; 25	POC; 10	MCH; 38	KAN; 4	KEN; 18	BLN; 7	POC; 10	GTW; 21	NSH; 40	MCH; 15	ISF; 29	MIL; 15	TOL; 32	DSF; 2	CHI; 25	SLM; 26	TAL; 33	IOW; 17	9th	4260	
2007	Day Enterprises	14	Chevy	DAY	USA	NSH	SLM	KAN	WIN	KEN	TOL; 31	IOW	POC	MCH	BLN	KEN	POC	NSH	ISF	MIL	GTW; 26	DSF	CHI	SLM	TAL	TOL	119th	75	
