= 2008 NASCAR Nationwide Series =

American motorsport season

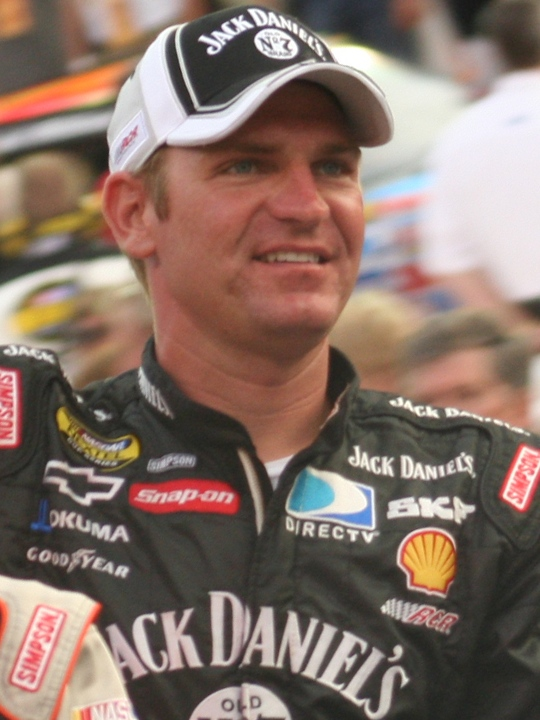
Clint Bowyer, the 2008 Nationwide Series champion.

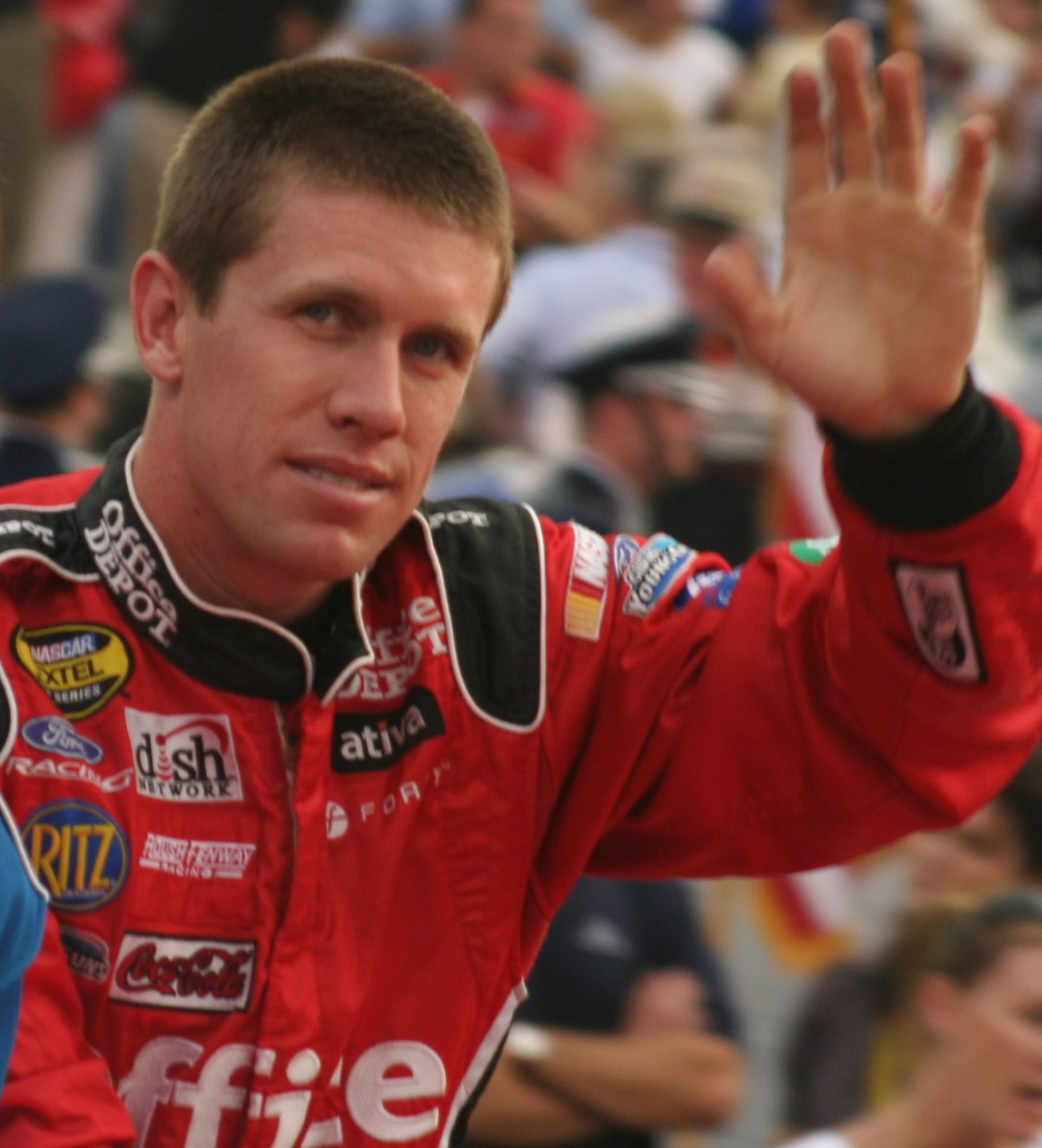
Carl Edwards, the 2008 Nationwide Series runner-up.

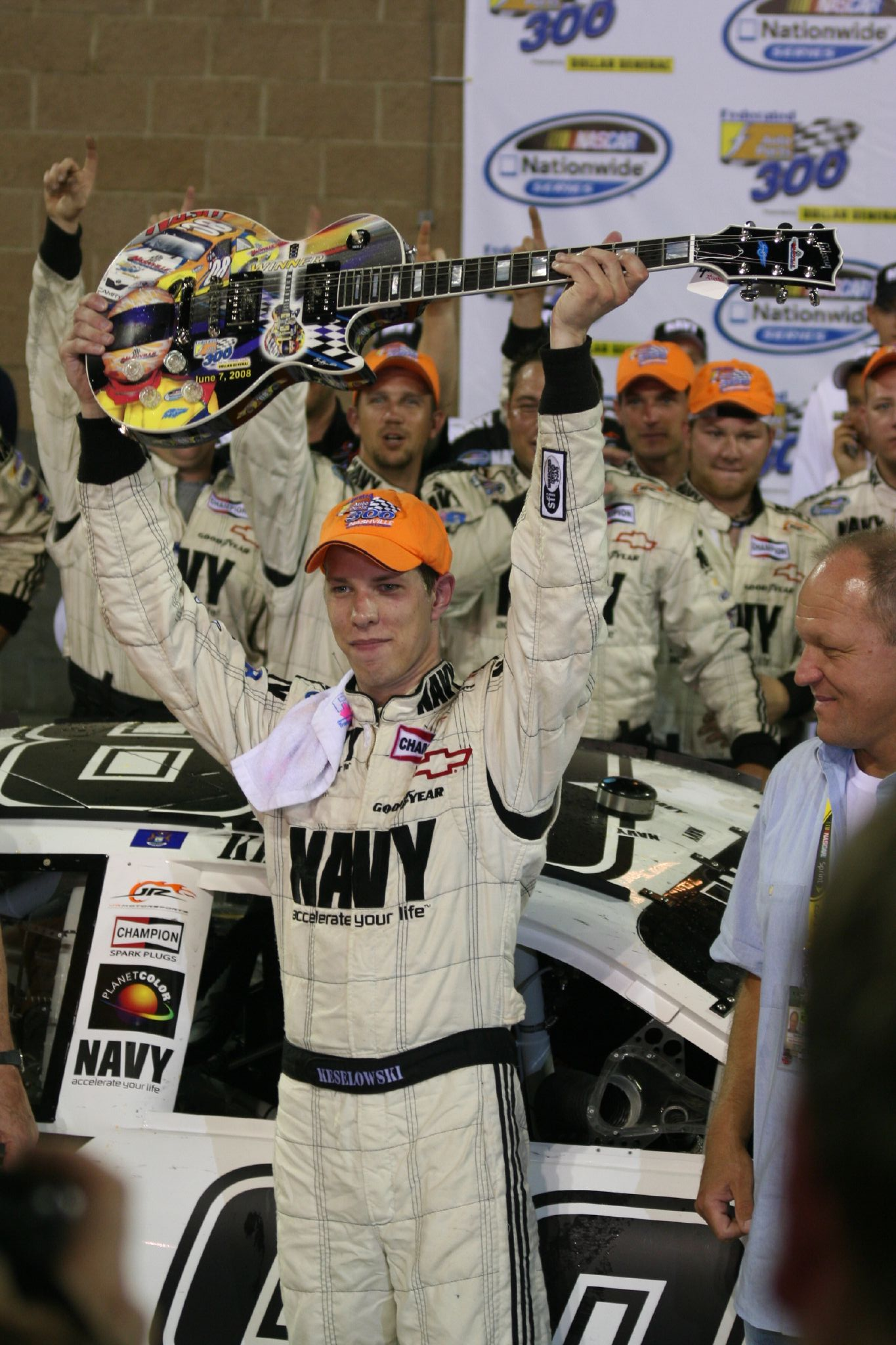
Brad Keselowski, who finished third in points, was the highest-finishing series regular in the standings.

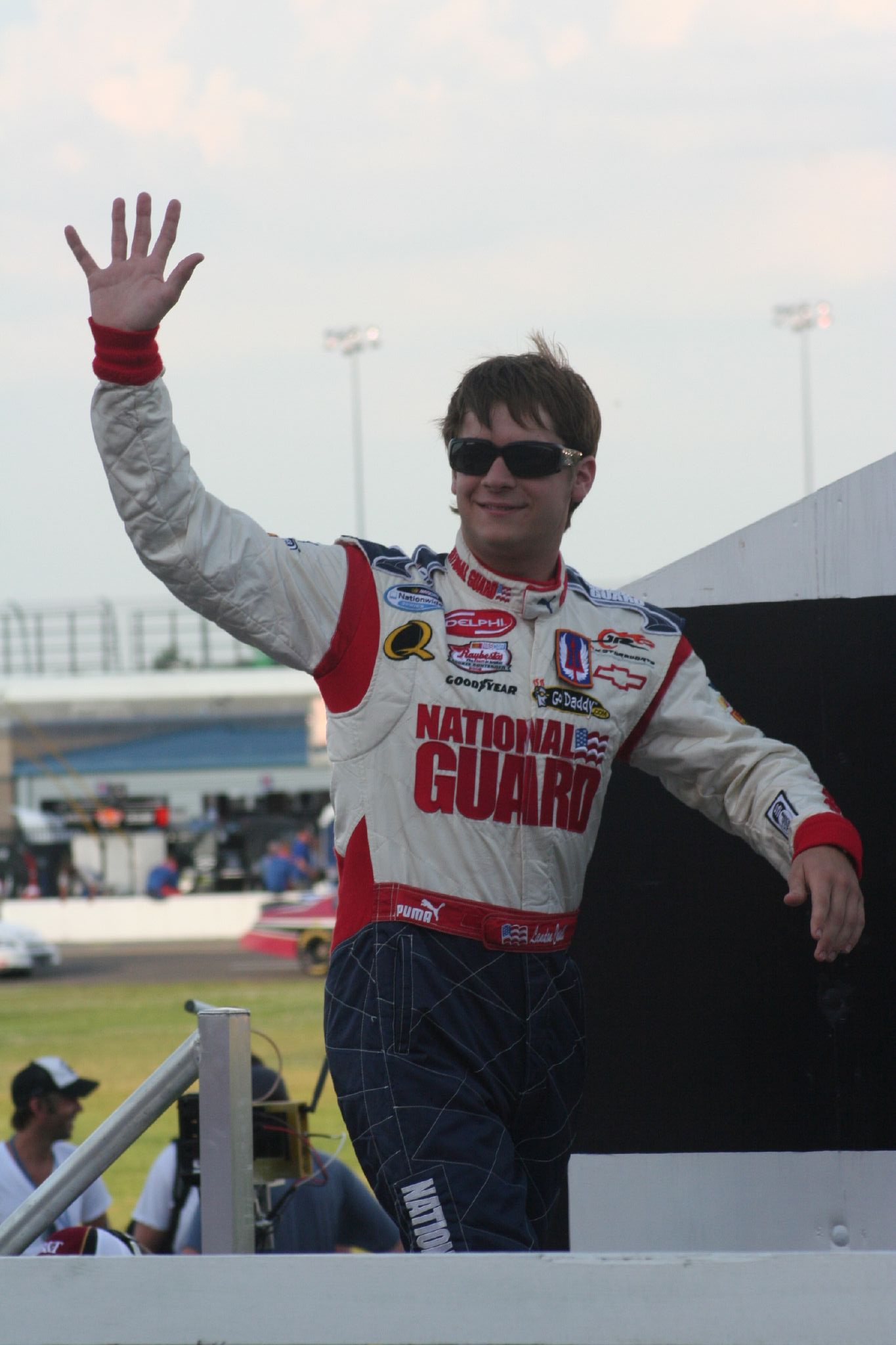
Landon Cassill won the Rookie of the Year title.

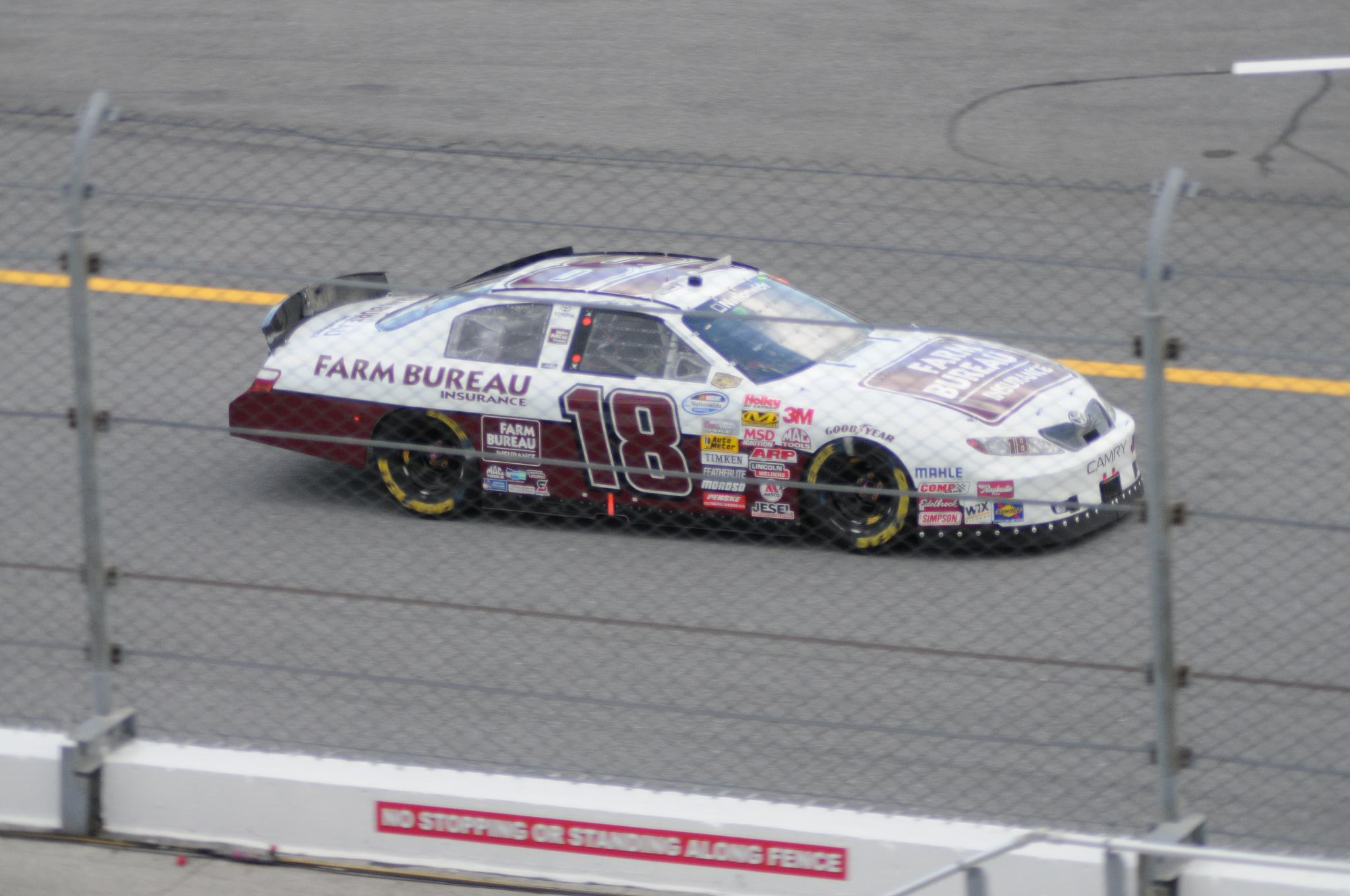
Toyota won the manufacturer's championship.

The 2008 NASCAR Nationwide Series was the 27th season of the NASCAR Nationwide Series, the second national professional stock car racing series sanctioned by NASCAR in the United States. The season began on February 16 at Daytona International Speedway with the Camping World 300, and ended on November 15 at Homestead–Miami Speedway with the Ford 300. This was the first season in which NASCAR's second national series was known as the Nationwide Series, ending the 26-year sponsorship by Anheuser-Busch's Busch Beer. The seven-year agreement gave Nationwide Insurance the exclusive rights to tie its brand to NASCAR's second-most popular racing series.

== Schedule ==
The following table shows the 2008 schedule published by NASCAR.

No.	Race title	Track	Location	Date
1	Camping World 300	Daytona International Speedway	Daytona Beach, Florida	February 16
2	Stater Brothers 300	Auto Club Speedway	Fontana, California	February 23
3	Sam's Town 300	Las Vegas Motor Speedway	Las Vegas, Nevada	March 1
4	Nicorette 300	Atlanta Motor Speedway	Hampton, Georgia	March 8
5	Sharpie Mini 300	Bristol Motor Speedway	Bristol, Tennessee	March 15
6	Pepsi 300	Nashville Superspeedway	Lebanon, Tennessee	March 22
7	O'Reilly 300	Texas Motor Speedway	Fort Worth, Texas	April 5
8	Bashas' Supermarkets 200	Phoenix International Raceway	Avondale, Arizona	April 11
9	Corona México 200	Autódromo Hermanos Rodríguez	Mexico City, Mexico	April 20
10	Aaron's 312	Talladega Superspeedway	Lincoln, Alabama	April 26
11	Lipton Tea 250	Richmond International Raceway	Richmond, Virginia	May 2
12	Diamond Hill Plywood 200	Darlington Raceway	Darlington, South Carolina	May 9
13	Carquest Auto Parts 300	Lowe's Motor Speedway	Concord, North Carolina	May 24
14	Heluva Good! 200	Dover International Speedway	Dover, Delaware	May 31
15	Federated Auto Parts 300	Nashville Superspeedway	Lebanon, Tennessee	June 7
16	Meijer 300	Kentucky Speedway	Sparta, Kentucky	June 14
17	Camping World RV Rental 250	Milwaukee Mile	West Allis, Wisconsin	June 21
18	Camping World RV Sales 200	New Hampshire Motor Speedway	Loudon, New Hampshire	June 28
19	Winn-Dixie 250	Daytona International Speedway	Daytona Beach, Florida	July 4
20	Dollar General 300	Chicagoland Speedway	Joliet, Illinois	July 11
21	Missouri-Illinois Dodge Dealers 250	Gateway International Raceway	Madison, Illinois	July 19
22	Kroger 200	Lucas Oil Indianapolis Raceway Park	Brownsburg, Indiana	July 26
23	NAPA Auto Parts 200	Circuit Gilles Villeneuve	Montreal, Quebec, Canada	August 2
24	Zippo 200	Watkins Glen International	Watkins Glen, New York	August 9
25	CarFax 250	Michigan International Speedway	Cambridge Township, Michigan	August 16
26	Food City 250	Bristol Motor Speedway	Bristol, Tennessee	August 22
27	Camping World 300	Auto Club Speedway	Fontana, California	August 30
28	Emerson Radio 250	Richmond International Raceway	Richmond, Virginia	September 5
29	RoadLoans.com 200	Dover International Speedway	Dover, Delaware	September 20
30	Kansas Lottery 300	Kansas Speedway	Kansas City, Kansas	September 27
31	Dollar General 300	Lowe's Motor Speedway	Concord, North Carolina	October 10
32	Sam's Town 250	Memphis Motorsports Park	Millington, Tennessee	October 25
33	O'Reilly Challenge	Texas Motor Speedway	Fort Worth, Texas	November 1
34	Arizona.Travel 200	Phoenix International Raceway	Avondale, Arizona	November 8
35	Ford 300	Homestead–Miami Speedway	Homestead, Florida	November 15

== Teams and drivers ==
=== Complete schedule ===
Manufacturer	Team	No.	Driver	Crew chief
Chevrolet	CJM Racing	11	Jason Keller 28	Todd Gordon 31; Michael Sibley 4
Chevrolet	CJM Racing	11	Scott Lagasse Jr. 7	Todd Gordon 31; Michael Sibley 4
Chevrolet	Front Row Motorsports	24	Eric McClure 32	Cal Boprey 15; Carl Long 20
Chevrolet	Front Row Motorsports	24	Brian Simo 3	Cal Boprey 15; Carl Long 20
Chevrolet	Jay Robinson Racing	28	Kirk Shelmerdine 1	Kenneth Campbell 2 Bob Keselowski 5 Rick Gay 23; Mark Fordham 1 Chris Rice 4
Chevrolet	Jay Robinson Racing	28	Brian Keselowski 4	Kenneth Campbell 2 Bob Keselowski 5 Rick Gay 23; Mark Fordham 1 Chris Rice 4
Chevrolet	Jay Robinson Racing	28	Kenny Wallace 30	Kenneth Campbell 2 Bob Keselowski 5 Rick Gay 23; Mark Fordham 1 Chris Rice 4
Chevrolet	JD Motorsports	01	Dwayne Leik 2 (Note: Dwayne Leik qualified the No. 01 car at Daytona (race #1), but was replaced in the race by Kertus Davis after he failed to qualify in his own No. 0 car.)	
Chevrolet	JD Motorsports	01	Kertus Davis 14	
Chevrolet	JD Motorsports	01	J. C. Stout 1	
Chevrolet	JD Motorsports	01	Mike Potter 2	
Chevrolet	JD Motorsports	01	James Hylton 1	
Chevrolet	JD Motorsports	01	Danny Efland 12	
Chevrolet	JD Motorsports	01	Trevor Boys 1	
Chevrolet	JD Motorsports	01	Wheeler Boys 2	
Chevrolet	JD Motorsports	01	Larry Gunselman 1	
Chevrolet	JR Motorsports	5	Dale Earnhardt Jr. 8	Chad Walter 14; Lance McGrew 7 Cam Strader 13
Chevrolet	JR Motorsports	5	Mark Martin 5	Chad Walter 14; Lance McGrew 7 Cam Strader 13
Chevrolet	JR Motorsports	5	Martin Truex Jr. 1	Chad Walter 14; Lance McGrew 7 Cam Strader 13
Chevrolet	JR Motorsports	5	Landon Cassill 16	Chad Walter 14; Lance McGrew 7 Cam Strader 13
Chevrolet	JR Motorsports	5	Adrián Fernández 1	Chad Walter 14; Lance McGrew 7 Cam Strader 13
Chevrolet	JR Motorsports	5	Jimmie Johnson 3	Chad Walter 14; Lance McGrew 7 Cam Strader 13
Chevrolet	JR Motorsports	5	Ron Fellows 1	Chad Walter 14; Lance McGrew 7 Cam Strader 13
Chevrolet	JR Motorsports	88	Brad Keselowski	Tony Eury Sr.
Chevrolet	Kevin Harvick, Inc.	33	Kevin Harvick 22	Wally Rogers 19; Rick Ren 2 Jason Meeks 13
Chevrolet	Kevin Harvick, Inc.	33	Cale Gale (R) 10	Wally Rogers 19; Rick Ren 2 Jason Meeks 13
Chevrolet	Kevin Harvick, Inc.	33	Ron Hornaday Jr. 2	Wally Rogers 19; Rick Ren 2 Jason Meeks 13
Chevrolet	Kevin Harvick, Inc.	33	Ryan Newman 1	Wally Rogers 19; Rick Ren 2 Jason Meeks 13
Chevrolet	MSRP Motorsports	90	Steve Grissom 1	Jack Walter 3 David Ingram Jr. 32
Chevrolet	MSRP Motorsports	90	Scott Lynch 1	Jack Walter 3 David Ingram Jr. 32
Chevrolet	MSRP Motorsports	90	Todd Bodine 1	Jack Walter 3 David Ingram Jr. 32
Chevrolet	MSRP Motorsports	90	Johnny Chapman 27	Jack Walter 3 David Ingram Jr. 32
Chevrolet	MSRP Motorsports	90	Chris Cook 2	Jack Walter 3 David Ingram Jr. 32
Chevrolet	MSRP Motorsports	90	Don Thomson Jr. 1	Jack Walter 3 David Ingram Jr. 32
Chevrolet	MSRP Motorsports	90	Terry Cook 2	Jack Walter 3 David Ingram Jr. 32
Chevrolet	Phoenix Racing	1	Johnny Sauter 5	Jon Wolfe 9 Marc Reno 26
Chevrolet	Phoenix Racing	1	Sterling Marlin 1	Jon Wolfe 9 Marc Reno 26
Chevrolet	Phoenix Racing	1	Mike Bliss 29	Jon Wolfe 9 Marc Reno 26
Chevrolet	Richard Childress Racing	2	Clint Bowyer	Dan Deeringhoff
Chevrolet	Richard Childress Racing	29	Scott Wimmer 22	Pat Smith
Chevrolet	Richard Childress Racing	29	Jeff Burton 13	Pat Smith
Chevrolet	Rusty Wallace Racing	64	David Stremme 32	Steve Darne 6 Dale Ferguson 29
Chevrolet	Rusty Wallace Racing	64	Max Papis 3	Steve Darne 6 Dale Ferguson 29
Chevrolet	Rusty Wallace Racing	66	Steve Wallace	Harold Holly
Dodge	Chip Ganassi Racing	40	Dario Franchitti (R) 14	Brad Parrott
Dodge	Chip Ganassi Racing	40	Bryan Clauson (R) 16	Brad Parrott
Dodge	Chip Ganassi Racing	40	Scott Pruett 2	Brad Parrott
Dodge	Chip Ganassi Racing	40	Reed Sorenson 1	Brad Parrott
Dodge	Chip Ganassi Racing	40	Kevin Hamlin 1	Brad Parrott
Dodge	Chip Ganassi Racing	40	Juan Pablo Montoya 1	Brad Parrott
Dodge	Gillett Evernham Motorsports	9	Kasey Kahne 10	
Dodge	Gillett Evernham Motorsports	9	Elliott Sadler 4	
Dodge	Gillett Evernham Motorsports	9	Patrick Carpentier 8	
Dodge	Gillett Evernham Motorsports	9	Chase Miller (R) 12	
Dodge	Gillett Evernham Motorsports	9	A. J. Allmendinger 1	
Dodge	MacDonald Motorsports	81	D. J. Kennington 26	
Dodge	MacDonald Motorsports	81	Brad Baker 1	
Dodge	MacDonald Motorsports	81	Bryan Clauson 1	
Dodge	MacDonald Motorsports	81	Randy MacDonald 2	
Dodge	MacDonald Motorsports	81	Shane Huffman 1	
Dodge	MacDonald Motorsports	81	P. J. Jones 1	
Dodge	MacDonald Motorsports	81	Kevin Hamlin 2	
Dodge	MacDonald Motorsports	81	Bobby Hillin Jr. 1	
Ford	Baker Curb Racing	27	Brad Coleman 24	Shawn Parker 24; Jeff White 11
Ford	Baker Curb Racing	27	David Gilliland 2	Shawn Parker 24; Jeff White 11
Ford	Baker Curb Racing	27	Burney Lamar 1	Shawn Parker 24; Jeff White 11
Ford	Baker Curb Racing	27	Casey Atwood 1	Shawn Parker 24; Jeff White 11
Ford	Baker Curb Racing	27	Jason Keller 7	Shawn Parker 24; Jeff White 11
Ford	JTG Daugherty Racing	47	Kelly Bires	Scott Zipadelli
Ford	JTG Daugherty Racing	59	Marcos Ambrose	Walter Giles 8 Gary Cogswell 27
Ford	Roush Fenway Racing	6	David Ragan	Mike Kelley
Ford	Roush Fenway Racing	60	Carl Edwards	Pierre Kuettel 16; Drew Blickensderfer 19
Ford	Team Rensi Motorsports	25	Bobby Hamilton Jr. 33	Chris Wright
Ford	Team Rensi Motorsports	25	Boris Said 2	Chris Wright
Toyota	Braun Racing	32	Denny Hamlin 10	
Toyota	Braun Racing	32	Kyle Busch 10	
Toyota	Braun Racing	32	Brian Vickers 7	
Toyota	Braun Racing	32	James Buescher 6	
Toyota	Braun Racing	32	Michel Jourdain Jr. 1	
Toyota	Braun Racing	32	Jacques Villeneuve 1	
Toyota	Braun Racing	38	Jason Leffler	Stewart Cooper 7 Paul Wolfe 15; Todd Lohse 13
Toyota	Germain Racing	7	Mike Wallace	Bruce Cook
Toyota	Joe Gibbs Racing	20	Tony Stewart 9	Dave Rogers 25; Wally Brown 4 Doug Hewitt 6
Toyota	Joe Gibbs Racing	20	Kyle Busch 3	Dave Rogers 25; Wally Brown 4 Doug Hewitt 6
Toyota	Joe Gibbs Racing	20	Denny Hamlin 5	Dave Rogers 25; Wally Brown 4 Doug Hewitt 6
Toyota	Joe Gibbs Racing	20	Joey Logano 18	Dave Rogers 25; Wally Brown 4 Doug Hewitt 6
Toyota	Michael Waltrip Racing	99	David Reutimann	Jerry Baxter
Chevrolet Ford	Day Enterprise Racing	05	Brett Rowe 16	
Chevrolet Ford	Day Enterprise Racing	05	Danny O'Quinn Jr. 1	
Chevrolet Ford	Day Enterprise Racing	05	Justin Ashburn 3	
Chevrolet Ford	Day Enterprise Racing	05	Burney Lamar 12	
Chevrolet Ford	Day Enterprise Racing	05	Casey Atwood 3	
Chevrolet Ford	MSRP Motorsports	91	Larry Gunselman 10	
Chevrolet Ford	MSRP Motorsports	91	Kenny Hendrick 2	
Chevrolet Ford	MSRP Motorsports	91	Terry Cook 5	
Chevrolet Ford	MSRP Motorsports	91	Justin Hobgood 15	
Chevrolet Ford	MSRP Motorsports	91	Scott Steckly 1	
Chevrolet Ford	MSRP Motorsports	91	Michael McDowell 1	
Chevrolet Ford	MSRP Motorsports	91	Todd Bodine 1	
Chevrolet Ford	Specialty Racing	61	Kevin Lepage 19	
Chevrolet Ford	Specialty Racing	61	Brandon Whitt 14	
Chevrolet Ford	Stanton Barrett Motorsports	61	Stan Barrett 2	
Chevrolet Dodge	Faith Motorsports	89	Morgan Shepherd	
Chevrolet Dodge	Jay Robinson Racing	4	Robert Richardson Jr. 10	
Chevrolet Dodge	Jay Robinson Racing	4	Landon Cassill 3	
Chevrolet Dodge	Jay Robinson Racing	4	Derrike Cope 19	
Chevrolet Dodge	Jay Robinson Racing	4	Jerick Johnson 1	
Chevrolet Dodge	Sheltra Motorsports	4	Patrick Sheltra 2	
Dodge Toyota	Fitz Motorsports	22	Mike Bliss 6	Paul Wolfe 20; Steve Darne 15
Dodge Toyota	Fitz Motorsports	22	Robby Gordon 2	Paul Wolfe 20; Steve Darne 15
Dodge Toyota	Fitz Motorsports	22	Rubén Pardo 2	Paul Wolfe 20; Steve Darne 15
Dodge Toyota	Fitz Motorsports	22	Reed Sorenson 1	Paul Wolfe 20; Steve Darne 15
Dodge Toyota	Fitz Motorsports	22	Johnny Sauter 1	Paul Wolfe 20; Steve Darne 15
Dodge Toyota	Fitz Motorsports	22	Josh Wise 13	Paul Wolfe 20; Steve Darne 15
Dodge Toyota	Fitz Motorsports	22	Andrew Ranger 5	Paul Wolfe 20; Steve Darne 15
Dodge Toyota	Fitz Motorsports	22	Ryan Newman 1	Paul Wolfe 20; Steve Darne 15
Dodge Toyota	Fitz Motorsports	22	Jarit Johnson 1	Paul Wolfe 20; Steve Darne 15
Dodge Toyota	Fitz Motorsports	22	Marc Davis 3	Paul Wolfe 20; Steve Darne 15
Ford Chevrolet Dodge	Means Racing	52	Donnie Neuenberger 7	
Ford Chevrolet Dodge	Means Racing	52	Derrike Cope 8	
Ford Chevrolet Dodge	Means Racing	52	Scott Gaylord 5	
Ford Chevrolet Dodge	Means Racing	52	Brad Teague 13 (Note: Brad Teague qualified the No. 52 car at Chicagoland (race #20), but was replaced in the race by Kevin Lepage after he failed to qualify in his own No. 43 car.)	
Ford Chevrolet Dodge	Means Racing	52	Kevin Lepage 1	
Ford Chevrolet Dodge	Means Racing	52	Boris Said 1	
Ford Chevrolet Dodge	Means Racing	52	Tony Raines 1	

=== Part-time schedule ===
Manufacturer	Team	No.	Driver(s)	Crew chief	Rounds
Chevrolet	Bob Schacht Motorsports	75	Johnny Sauter	Bob Schacht	1
Chevrolet	Dale Earnhardt, Inc.	8	Martin Truex Jr.	Mike Greci	1
Chevrolet	Dale Earnhardt, Inc.	8	Kerry Earnhardt	Mike Greci	1
Chevrolet	Elite 2 Racing	84	Mike Harmon		18
Chevrolet	Elite 2 Racing	84	Carl Long		1
Chevrolet	Elite 2 Racing	84	Kevin Lepage		1
Chevrolet	Elite 2 Racing	84	Dale Quarterley		2
Chevrolet	JD Motorsports	0	Kertus Davis	Gene Allnut 2 Cindy Wosley 4 Brad Hicks 22; Justin Thomas 3 Steve Jenkins 3	2
Chevrolet	JD Motorsports	0	Dwayne Leik	Gene Allnut 2 Cindy Wosley 4 Brad Hicks 22; Justin Thomas 3 Steve Jenkins 3	4
Chevrolet	JD Motorsports	0	Mike Potter	Gene Allnut 2 Cindy Wosley 4 Brad Hicks 22; Justin Thomas 3 Steve Jenkins 3	2
Chevrolet	JD Motorsports	0	Danny Efland	Gene Allnut 2 Cindy Wosley 4 Brad Hicks 22; Justin Thomas 3 Steve Jenkins 3	7
Chevrolet	JD Motorsports	0	Donnie Neuenberger	Gene Allnut 2 Cindy Wosley 4 Brad Hicks 22; Justin Thomas 3 Steve Jenkins 3	1
Chevrolet	JD Motorsports	0	Joe Fox	Gene Allnut 2 Cindy Wosley 4 Brad Hicks 22; Justin Thomas 3 Steve Jenkins 3	1
Chevrolet	JD Motorsports	0	J. C. Stout	Gene Allnut 2 Cindy Wosley 4 Brad Hicks 22; Justin Thomas 3 Steve Jenkins 3	2
Chevrolet	JD Motorsports	0	Brad Teague	Gene Allnut 2 Cindy Wosley 4 Brad Hicks 22; Justin Thomas 3 Steve Jenkins 3	1
Chevrolet	JD Motorsports	0	Larry Gunselman	Gene Allnut 2 Cindy Wosley 4 Brad Hicks 22; Justin Thomas 3 Steve Jenkins 3	12
Chevrolet	JD Motorsports	0	Wheeler Boys	Gene Allnut 2 Cindy Wosley 4 Brad Hicks 22; Justin Thomas 3 Steve Jenkins 3	1
Chevrolet	JD Motorsports	0	David Green	Gene Allnut 2 Cindy Wosley 4 Brad Hicks 22; Justin Thomas 3 Steve Jenkins 3	1
Chevrolet	Jeremy Clements Racing	50	Jeremy Clements	Tony Clements	4
Chevrolet	JR Motorsports	48	Jimmie Johnson	Chad Knaus	1
Chevrolet	JR Motorsports	83	Dale Earnhardt Jr.	Lance McGrew	1
Chevrolet	Front Row Motorsports	43	Kevin Lepage	Jimmy Means	1
Chevrolet	Jay Robinson Racing	49	Derrike Cope	Jay Robinson 4 Gene Allnut 1 Kenneth Campbell 12; Curtis Aldridge 5	4
Chevrolet	Jay Robinson Racing	49	Shane Hall	Jay Robinson 4 Gene Allnut 1 Kenneth Campbell 12; Curtis Aldridge 5	1
Chevrolet	Jay Robinson Racing	49	Kertus Davis	Jay Robinson 4 Gene Allnut 1 Kenneth Campbell 12; Curtis Aldridge 5	17
Chevrolet	Jay Robinson Racing	82	Derrike Cope	Jay Robinson	1
Chevrolet	Kevin Harvick, Inc.	77	Cale Gale (R)	Jason Meeks	3
Chevrolet	Key Motorsports	31	Jeff Green	Tommy Morgan	3
Chevrolet	SKI Motorsports	31	Kenny Hendrick		19 (Note: Kenny Hendrick qualified the No. 31 car at Memphis (race #32), but was replaced in the race by Stanton Barrett after he failed to qualify in his own No. 30 car.)
Chevrolet	SKI Motorsports	31	Shane Huffman		1
Chevrolet	SKI Motorsports	31	Jeff Fuller		1
Chevrolet	SKI Motorsports	31	Stanton Barrett		1
Chevrolet	SKI Motorsports	30	Stanton Barrett		28
Chevrolet	SKI Motorsports	30	Kenny Hendrick		1
Chevrolet	SKI Motorsports	34	Kenny Hendrick	Mike Dayton	1
Chevrolet	SKI Motorsports	93	Kenny Hendrick	Mike Dayton	1
Chevrolet	Mac Hill Motorsports	56	Danny O'Quinn Jr.	Tony Lambert	3
Chevrolet	Mac Hill Motorsports	56	Travis Kittleson	Tony Lambert	4
Chevrolet	ML Motorsports	70	Mark Green	Tom Sokoloski 7 Brian Ross 14	21
Chevrolet	NEMCO Motorsports	87	Joe Nemechek	Mike Boerschinger	1
Chevrolet	O'Connell Racing	09	Kevin O'Connell	Barry O'Brien	2
Chevrolet	R3 Motorsports	23	Robert Richardson Jr.	Rob Jones 5 Robert Fuller 3	8
Chevrolet	RB1 Motorsports	71	Ron Young	Greg Tester	1
Chevrolet	Richard Childress Racing	21	Bobby Labonte	Shane Wilson	5
Chevrolet	Richard Childress Racing	21	Stephen Leicht	Shane Wilson	5
Chevrolet	Richard Childress Racing	21	Austin Dillon	Shane Wilson	2
Chevrolet	Richard Childress Racing	21	Scott Wimmer	Shane Wilson	1
Chevrolet	Silva Motorsports	65	Stan Silva Jr.	Shaun Capener	2
Chevrolet	Stott Classic Racing	02	Andy Ponstein	Corrie Stott	11
Chevrolet	Stott Classic Racing	02	Dominick Casola	Corrie Stott	1
Chevrolet	ThorSport Racing	13	Shelby Howard	Chris Rice	2
Chevrolet	Transnet Racing	98	Alex García	Stan Hover	3
Chevrolet	Curb Agajanian Performance Group	98	Johnny Sauter	Andy Bean	2
Dodge	Beahr Racing Enterprises	57	Jerick Johnson		1
Dodge	Beahr Racing Enterprises	57	Justin Ashburn		1
Dodge	Beahr Racing Enterprises	57	Chad Beahr		2
Dodge	Mike Ege Racing	57	Nick Tucker		1
Dodge	Mike Ege Racing	57	Michael Guerity		1
Dodge	Carl Long Racing	46	Carl Long	Rick Markle	1
Dodge	Chip Ganassi Racing	41	Bryan Clauson (R)	Brian Pattie	4
Dodge	Chip Ganassi Racing	41	Kyle Krisiloff	Brian Pattie	6
Dodge	Chip Ganassi Racing	42	Juan Pablo Montoya	Brian Pattie	1
Dodge	CFK Motorsports	73	Larry Gunselman	Dom Turse 4 Rick Markle 8	1
Dodge	CFK Motorsports	73	Kertus Davis	Dom Turse 4 Rick Markle 8	1
Dodge	CFK Motorsports	73	Kevin Lepage	Dom Turse 4 Rick Markle 8	10
Dodge	Faith Motorsports	75	Tim Weaver	Yullianna Vizzuett	1
Dodge	Fitz Motorsports	36	Kenny Wallace	Rick Gay 6 Bill Farnsworth 6	5
Dodge	Fitz Motorsports	36	Rubén Pardo	Rick Gay 6 Bill Farnsworth 6	4
Dodge	Fitz Motorsports	36	Charles Lewandoski	Rick Gay 6 Bill Farnsworth 6	2
Dodge	Fitz Motorsports	36	Chad Blount	Rick Gay 6 Bill Farnsworth 6	1
Dodge	Gillett Evernham Motorsports	19	Chase Miller (R)	Kevin Kidd	2
Dodge	Penske Racing	12	Sam Hornish Jr.	Matthew Gimbel	10
Dodge	Penske Racing	12	Justin Allgaier	Matthew Gimbel	4
Dodge	Robby Gordon Motorsports	55	Robby Gordon	Walter Giles 1 Dana Brugman 1 Steve Graham 1	2
Dodge	Robby Gordon Motorsports	55	Brian Ickler	Walter Giles 1 Dana Brugman 1 Steve Graham 1	1
Dodge	Sadler-Hamilton Racing	95	Willie Allen	Danny Gill	2
Dodge	TW Motorsports	84	José Luis Ramírez	Troy Williams	1
Dodge	TW Motorsports	86	Antonio Pérez	Mark Tutor 1 Troy Williams 1	2
Dodge	Whitney Motorsports	92	Brian Keselowski	Bob Keselowski	11
Ford	Baker Curb Racing	37	Brad Baker	Jeff White	7
Ford	Baker Curb Racing	37	Greg Biffle	Jeff White	1
Ford	Baker Curb Racing	37	Burney Lamar	Jeff White	9
Ford	Baker Curb Racing	37	John Young	Jeff White	1
Ford	Baker Curb Racing	37	Rafael Martínez	Jeff White	1
Ford	Borneman Motorsports	83	Johnny Borneman III	Kevin Cram	5
Ford	Richardson-Haas Motorsports	14	David Gilliland	Robert Edwards	1
Ford	Roush Fenway Racing	16	Greg Biffle		14
Ford	Roush Fenway Racing	16	Jamie McMurray		3
Ford	Roush Fenway Racing	16	Colin Braun		5
Ford	Roush Fenway Racing	17	Matt Kenseth		7
Ford	Roush Fenway Racing	17	Jamie McMurray		8
Ford	Roush Fenway Racing	17	Erik Darnell		1
Ford	RAB Racing	09	John Wes Townley	Keith Hinkein 3 Blake Bainbridge 4	7
Ford	Ray Hackett Racing	76	Ryan Hackett	Rodney Goodman 2 Ray Hackett 1	3
Ford	Specialty Racing	62	Brandon Whitt	Doug Taylor	2
Ford	Team Rensi Motorsports	35	Danny O'Quinn Jr.	Ronald Drake	5
Toyota	Braun Racing	10	Brian Vickers	Trent Owens 5 Bryan Schaffer 2	5
Toyota	Braun Racing	10	Justin Marks	Trent Owens 5 Bryan Schaffer 2	1
Toyota	Braun Racing	10	Dave Blaney	Trent Owens 5 Bryan Schaffer 2	1
Toyota	D'Hondt Motorsports	92	Kyle Busch	Jerry Pitts	1
Toyota	Germain Racing	03	Todd Bodine	Doug Chouinard	1
Toyota	Germain Racing	03	Justin Marks	Doug Chouinard	1
Toyota	Germain Racing	03	Michael Annett	Doug Chouinard	1
Toyota	Joe Gibbs Racing	18	Kyle Busch		16
Toyota	Joe Gibbs Racing	18	Denny Hamlin		5
Toyota	Joe Gibbs Racing	18	Joey Logano		1
Toyota	Joe Gibbs Racing	18	Marc Davis		1
Toyota	Michael Waltrip Racing	00	Michael McDowell	Bobby Kennedy	1
Toyota	Michael Waltrip Racing	00	Josh Wise	Paul Wolfe	5
Chevrolet Dodge	CFK Motorsports	78	Nick Tucker	Del Markle	1
Chevrolet Dodge	CFK Motorsports	78	Johnny Sauter	Del Markle	5
Chevrolet Dodge	CFK Motorsports	78	Jennifer Jo Cobb	Del Markle	1
Chevrolet Dodge	CFK Motorsports	78	Jason White	Del Markle	1
Chevrolet Dodge	CFK Motorsports	78	Derrike Cope	Del Markle	1
Chevrolet Ford	Means Racing	55	Brad Teague	Mark Arellano	2
Chevrolet Ford	Means Racing	55	Scott Gaylord	Mark Arellano	1
Chevrolet Ford	Means Racing	55	Chad Chaffin	Mark Arellano	1

== Television ==
The 2008 TV schedule followed the same format as 2007, with most races broadcast on ESPN2 and three races broadcast on ABC when ESPN2 broadcast larger sporting events. All races were to be shown live on free-to-air TV in Australia on Ten HD. In South America, SPEED broadcast the entire season.

== 2008 season races ==
=== Camping World 300 ===
The Camping World 300 presented by Chevrolet was held February 16 at Daytona International Speedway. Tony Stewart won the pole and then went on to win the race. Stewart became the first driver to win the season opening Nationwide Series race at Daytona from the pole. Johnny Sauter, Cale Gale, Kertus Davis and David Gilliland all received 25-point penalties for various infractions.

Top ten finishers
Pos.	Car #	Driver	Make	Team
1	20	Tony Stewart	Toyota	Joe Gibbs Racing
2	18	Kyle Busch	Toyota	Joe Gibbs Racing
3	5	Dale Earnhardt Jr.	Chevrolet	JR Motorsports
4	10	Brian Vickers	Toyota	Braun Racing
5	17	Matt Kenseth	Ford	Roush Fenway Racing
6	41	Bryan Clauson (R)	Dodge	Chip Ganassi Racing
7	16	Greg Biffle	Ford	Roush Fenway Racing
8	32	Denny Hamlin	Toyota	Braun Racing
9	6	David Ragan	Ford	Roush Fenway Racing
10	60	Carl Edwards	Ford	Roush Fenway Racing
Average race speed: 154.154 mph (248.087 km/h)
Lead changes: 16 among 8 drivers
Cautions: 4 for 12 laps

Did not qualify: Danny O'Quinn Jr. (#56), Morgan Shepherd (#89), Larry Gunselman (#91), Kenny Wallace (#36), Kevin Lepage (#61), Joe Nemechek (#87), Donnie Neuenberger (#52), Brett Rowe (#05), Mike Harmon (#84), Kertus Davis (#0).

NOTE: On February 20 NASCAR announced that seven Nationwide teams had been penalized due to rule violations during Speedweeks at Daytona. The most notable was Dale Earnhardt Jr.'s #5 team whose crew chief was fined $25,000 and suspended for the next six Nationwide Series events until April 9. Earnhardt Jr. was penalized with the loss of 50 driver points, while car owner Rick Hendrick was penalized 50 owner points. An altered rear spoiler was found during post-practice template inspection which enhanced the aerodynamic performance on the car. On March 4 it was announced that some teams had their penalties upheld and some rescinded by the National Stock Car Racing Commission. Rusty Wallace, Inc. had 3 penalties rescinded on the #64 car driven by David Stremme. The commission also amended 2 of 3 penalties issued to Richardson-Hass Motorsports' #14 car driven by David Gilliland. The commission also reduced a fine against Kevin Harvick, Inc. #77 crew chief Charles Wilson from $15,000 to $5,000 and also reduced a suspension from the next 6 races to only 4 races. The commission opted to uphold penalties against the JD Motorsports #0 car driven by Kertus Davis. The commission also decided to amend 2 of 3 penalties issued to the Phoenix Racing #1 car driven by Johnny Sauter.

- Kertus Davis replaced Dwayne Leik in the #01 car in the race, after failing to qualify his #0.

=== Stater Brothers 300 ===
The Stater Brothers 300 was held on Monday, February 25 due to rain at the newly renamed Auto Club Speedway of Southern California (previously California Speedway) in Fontana, California. Jeff Burton won the pole due to qualifying being canceled after being rained out. The race was scheduled to be held on the 23rd, but water seeping onto the track surface prevented this, and it was then scheduled to be held after Sunday's Auto Club 500. More rain postponed that, and again also delayed the Nationwide race to Monday, an hour after the completion of the Sprint Cup Series race. Tony Stewart dominated most of the day leading 139 of 150 laps with fellow Toyota driver David Reutimann sitting in 2nd for much of the race.

Top ten finishers
Pos.	Car #	Driver	Make	Team
1	20	Tony Stewart	Toyota	Joe Gibbs Racing
2	32	Kyle Busch	Toyota	Braun Racing
3	33	Kevin Harvick	Chevrolet	Kevin Harvick, Inc.
4	99	David Reutimann	Toyota	Michael Waltrip Racing
5	60	Carl Edwards	Ford	Roush Fenway Racing
6	17	Jamie McMurray	Ford	Roush Fenway Racing
7	5	Dale Earnhardt Jr.	Chevrolet	JR Motorsports
8	29	Jeff Burton	Chevrolet	Richard Childress Racing
9	2	Clint Bowyer	Chevrolet	Richard Childress Racing
10	21	Stephen Leicht	Chevrolet	Richard Childress Racing
Average race speed: 141.769 mph (228.155 km/h)
Lead changes: 11 among 9 drivers
Cautions: 5 for 19 laps

Did not qualify: None, only 43 entries.

NOTE: Eric Norris driver of the #14 Carl A. Haas Motorsports entry withdrew, making only 42 starters.

=== Sam's Town 300 ===
The Sam's Town 300 was held on March 1 at Las Vegas Motor Speedway. Brian Vickers won the pole. Just like the previous two weeks, Tony Stewart dominated the race. However, his chance to score his first Vegas win were dashed on lap 138 when he spun while alongside David Reutimann. Hometown hero Kyle Busch had to start in the back but worked his way through the field and took the lead after a lap 63 pit stop. However, his day would end on lap 103 when he cut a right front tire. Another strong car, the #29 of Jeff Burton, worked his way through the field following an unscheduled pit stop. However, on lap 158, his engine blew while challenging Mark Martin for the lead. Eventually, after 12 cautions, the race would turn to three drivers: Martin who was seeking to return to Victory Lane, Carl Edwards who was looking to keep his momentum going after his Cup win in Fontana, and Brad Keselowski, trying to make a name for himself and become the first non Cup Series driver to win since Jason Leffler last year. On lap 195 while Edwards and Keselowski were going side by side at the start/finish line, Martin tapped Edwards in the rear, spinning him into Keselowski and sending the race into overtime. Martin would easily fend off former teammate Greg Biffle for his first Nationwide Series win of the season. Martin later apologized to both Edwards and Keselowski in victory lane.

Top ten finishers
Pos.	Car #	Driver	Make	Team
1	5	Mark Martin	Chevrolet	JR Motorsports
2	16	Greg Biffle	Ford	Roush Fenway Racing
3	2	Clint Bowyer	Chevrolet	Richard Childress Racing
4	33	Kevin Harvick	Chevrolet	Kevin Harvick, Inc.
5	64	David Stremme	Chevrolet	Rusty Wallace, Inc.
6	40	Dario Franchitti (R)	Dodge	Chip Ganassi Racing
7	7	Mike Wallace	Toyota	Germain Racing
8	9	Patrick Carpentier	Dodge	Gillett Evernham Motorsports
9	27	Brad Coleman	Ford	Baker Curb Racing
10	6	David Ragan	Ford	Roush Fenway Racing
Average race speed: 108.118 mph (173.999 km/h)
Lead changes: 15 among 11 drivers
Cautions: 13 for 55 laps

Did not qualify: Sam Hornish Jr. (#12), Mike Harmon (#84).

=== Nicorette 300 ===
The Nicorette 300 was held on March 10 at Atlanta Motor Speedway. Jeff Burton won the pole. As usual, the race would be dominated by Sprint Cup Series points leader Kyle Busch. Busch hoped to make history by being the points leader in all three of NASCAR's top racing circuits. He would do so to an extent, leading 153 laps. However, Busch's hopes would be derailed by a flat tire while entering turn 1. His misfortune would open the door for other drivers such as Matt Kenseth, Kevin Harvick, and polesitter Burton. David Ragan would take the top spot after pit stops under the caution for Busch's crash. However, Burton and Kenseth took first and second on lap 177. Things would stay this way for 9 laps until Kenseth made the pass for the lead. The main highlight of the race came on lap 189. While exiting turn two, Dale Earnhardt Jr. attempted to pass Eric McClure. However, McClure spun in front of Dale Jr., turning him into the wall and into the path of rookie Bryan Clauson, who hit McClure's car as it hit the wall, lifting it off the ground. This brought out a red flag lasting several minutes. Although Kenseth led with three to go, debris from Ragan's car brought out a green–white–checkered finish to lap 198, with Kenseth holding off Harvick for his first win of the season.

Top ten finishers
Pos.	Car #	Driver	Make	Team
1	17	Matt Kenseth	Ford	Roush Fenway Racing
2	33	Kevin Harvick	Chevrolet	Kevin Harvick, Inc.
3	29	Jeff Burton	Chevrolet	Richard Childress Racing
4	60	Carl Edwards	Ford	Roush Fenway Racing
5	21	Bobby Labonte	Chevrolet	Richard Childress Racing
6	88	Brad Keselowski	Chevrolet	JR Motorsports
7	22	Mike Bliss	Dodge	Fitz Motorsports
8	38	Jason Leffler	Toyota	Braun Racing
9	9	Kasey Kahne	Dodge	Gillett Evernham Motorsports
10	99	David Reutimann	Toyota	Michael Waltrip Racing
Average race speed: 131.290 mph (211.291 km/h)
Lead changes: 22 among 11 drivers
Cautions: 8 for 22 laps

Did not qualify: None, only 43 entries.

=== Sharpie Mini 300 ===
The Sharpie Mini 300 was held March 15 at Bristol Motor Speedway. Scott Wimmer won the pole. Unlike other races, Kyle Busch would not dominate this one, as he was taken out by a spinning Martin Truex Jr. on lap 13. 2006 Champion Kevin Harvick had one of the best cars all day but fell out of contention after his tire changer failed to secure a lugnut on lap 102. Clint Bowyer dominated the race, leading for 119 laps. However, the move of the race came on lap 164 when Bowyer and eight others stayed out on the track as rain began to hit the track. Up to that point, Bowyer had been fending off a charging Kasey Kahne for the past 40 laps before the rains hit. The cars would be pulled onto pit road on lap 171 and Bowyer would be declared the winner after a 47-minute rain delay.

Top ten finishers
Pos.	Car #	Driver	Make	Team
1	2	Clint Bowyer	Chevrolet	Richard Childress Racing
2	9	Kasey Kahne	Dodge	Gillett Evernham Motorsports
3	99	David Reutimann	Toyota	Michael Waltrip Racing
4	88	Brad Keselowski	Chevrolet	JR Motorsports
5	22	Mike Bliss	Dodge	Fitz Motorsports
6	38	Jason Leffler	Toyota	Braun Racing
7	33	Kevin Harvick	Chevrolet	Kevin Harvick, Inc.
8	6	David Ragan	Ford	Roush Fenway Racing
9	64	David Stremme	Chevrolet	Rusty Wallace Racing
10	7	Mike Wallace	Toyota	Germain Racing
Average race speed: 78.74 mph (126.72 km/h)
Lead changes: 6 among 3 drivers
Cautions: 7 for 30 laps

Did not qualify: Danny O'Quinn Jr. (#56), Sam Hornish Jr. (#12).

=== Pepsi 300 ===
The Pepsi 300 was held on March 22 at Nashville Superspeedway. Kyle Busch won the pole. As usual, Busch would dominate the race, leading 125 laps. However, his bad luck would continue as he spun coming out of turn 4. This move handed the lead to Bristol winner Clint Bowyer who held the top spot until teammate Scott Wimmer passed him with 20 to go. Wimmer would hang on to snap his 57 race winless streak (since Pikes Peak in 2003) and become the first non-Sprint Cup driver to win a race in 2008. This was also Wimmer's 6th and final career victory in the Series.

Top ten finishers
Pos.	Car #	Driver	Make	Team
1	29	Scott Wimmer	Chevrolet	Richard Childress Racing
2	2	Clint Bowyer	Chevrolet	Richard Childress Racing
3	60	Carl Edwards	Ford	Roush Fenway Racing
4	88	Brad Keselowski	Chevrolet	JR Motorsports
5	47	Kelly Bires	Ford	JTG Racing
6	64	David Stremme	Chevrolet	Rusty Wallace Racing
7	32	Denny Hamlin	Toyota	Braun Racing
8	33	Cale Gale	Chevrolet	Kevin Harvick, Inc.
9	99	David Reutimann	Toyota	Michael Waltrip Racing
10	25	Bobby Hamilton Jr.	Ford	Team Rensi Motorsports
Average race speed: 134.095 mph (215.805 km/h)
Lead changes: 10 among 4 drivers
Cautions: 3 for 20 laps

Did not qualify: Jerick Johnson (#57), Rubén Pardo (#36).

=== O'Reilly 300 ===
The O'Reilly 300 was held on April 5 at Texas Motor Speedway in Fort Worth, Texas. Kevin Harvick started from the pole after qualifying was rained out. Kyle Busch won the race, it was his first Nationwide Series win of the 2008 season. Busch led four times for 126 laps, including the final 43 laps of the race. Kevin Harvick who led 55 laps broke an axle on his first pit stop and lost 21 laps while his crew replaced it, he finished 34th. Tony Stewart went down a lap with an unscheduled pit stop on lap 71 after cutting his right rear tire. He had run over a lug nut on pit road during a green-flag pit stop on lap 56. Only 14 cars finished on the lead lap.

Top ten finishers
Pos.	Car #	Driver	Make	Team
1	18	Kyle Busch	Toyota	Joe Gibbs Racing
2	29	Jeff Burton	Chevrolet	Richard Childress Racing
3	2	Clint Bowyer	Chevrolet	Richard Childress Racing
4	21	Bobby Labonte	Chevrolet	Richard Childress Racing
5	16	Jamie McMurray	Ford	Roush Fenway Racing
6	32	Brian Vickers	Toyota	Braun Racing
7	5	Dale Earnhardt Jr.	Chevrolet	JR Motorsports
8	6	David Ragan	Ford	Roush Fenway Racing
9	38	Jason Leffler	Toyota	Braun Racing
10	20	Tony Stewart	Toyota	Joe Gibbs Racing
Average race speed: 151.707 mph (244.149 km/h)
Lead changes: 12 among 8 drivers
Cautions: 4 for 13 laps

Failed to make race as qualifying was canceled due to rain: Donnie Neuenberger (#0).

=== Bashas' Supermarkets 200 ===
The Bashas' Supermarkets 200 was held on April 11 at Phoenix International Raceway. Kyle Busch won the pole. And as usual, the race would be utterly dominated by Busch. Busch hoped to make history by being the points leader in all three of NASCAR's top racing circuits.

Top ten finishers
Pos.	Car #	Driver	Make	Team
1	18	Kyle Busch	Toyota	Joe Gibbs Racing
2	60	Carl Edwards	Ford	Roush Fenway Racing
3	20	Denny Hamlin	Toyota	Joe Gibbs Racing
4	33	Kevin Harvick	Chevrolet	Kevin Harvick, Inc.
5	6	David Ragan	Ford	Roush Fenway Racing
6	1	Mike Bliss	Chevrolet	Phoenix Racing
7	21	Stephen Leicht	Chevrolet	Richard Childress Racing
8	2	Clint Bowyer	Chevrolet	Richard Childress Racing
9	99	David Reutimann	Toyota	Michael Waltrip Racing
10	64	David Stremme	Chevrolet	Rusty Wallace, Inc.
Average race speed: 98.764 mph (158.945 km/h)
Lead changes: 14 among 5 drivers
Cautions: 9 for 36 laps

Did not qualify: None, only 43 entries.

=== Corona México 200 ===
The Corona México 200 was held on April 20 at Autódromo Hermanos Rodríguez in Mexico City, Mexico. Colin Braun won the pole. Kyle Busch won the race after passing Scott Pruett with nine laps remaining. Busch warned over his radio that Pruett would get dumped if he kept blocking him, a reference to the 2007 race. The win was Busch's first on a road course and his third straight Nationwide Series win. Scott Pruett led 36 of the 80 laps and wound up finishing third. Road course veteran Boris Said struggled for most of the day and was spun out by Marcos Ambrose with 28 laps remaining. The damage took Said out of the race, and he angrily pointed at Ambrose. Boris commented that "He either made a mistake or he's incredibly stupid, and I don't think he'd make a big mistake like that. I wouldn't expect it from him. "I'm not going to get mad, I'm just going to get even." Ambrose finished the day in second place, his best finish in the Nationwide Series. This was the last race held at Autódromo Hermanos Rodríguez for the NASCAR Nationwide Series.

Top ten finishers
Pos.	Car no.	Driver	Make	Team
1	20	Kyle Busch	Toyota	Joe Gibbs Racing
2	59	Marcos Ambrose	Ford	JTG Racing
3	40	Scott Pruett	Dodge	Chip Ganassi Racing
4	60	Carl Edwards	Ford	Roush Fenway Racing
5	9	Patrick Carpentier (R)	Dodge	Gillett Evernham Motorsports
6	2	Clint Bowyer	Chevrolet	Richard Childress Racing
7	29	Scott Wimmer	Chevrolet	Richard Childress Racing
8	88	Brad Keselowski	Chevrolet	JR Motorsports
9	1	Mike Bliss	Chevrolet	Phoenix Racing
10	66	Steve Wallace	Chevrolet	Rusty Wallace, Inc.
Average race speed: 68.124 mph (109.635 km/h)
Lead changes: 10 among 7 drivers
Cautions: 7 for 18 laps + (2 red flags)

Did not qualify: Brett Rowe (#05), Morgan Shepherd (#89), Derrike Cope (#49), Joe Fox (#0).

=== Aaron's 312 ===
The Aaron's 312 was held on April 26 at Talladega Superspeedway, in Talladega, Alabama. Tony Stewart won the pole and later went on to win the race. Tony Stewart and Dale Earnhardt Jr. dominated much of the race running in first and second place respectively. 2007 IndyCar Series champion Dario Franchitti blew a tire on lap 11 and spun around onto the apron in Turn 3 into the path of the #91 car driven by Larry Gunselman who slammed into the driver's side of Franchitti's car. Franchitti suffered a fractured left ankle and minor contusions from the hard impact, the injury would sideline him for 5 Sprint Cup Series races. The big wreck (often dubbed "The Big One") occurred on lap 71 when Kevin Lepage was coming off pit road and merged immediately in front of the lead pack traffic. Lepage was only running around 115 mph when the wreck happened compared to the leaders who were running 191 mph. Several contenders were taken out including Kyle Busch and Carl Edwards. The race was red flagged to clean up debris. Around 16 cars were involved in the wreck, during the race several drivers were penalized for blending onto the track too early, instead of blending at Turn 2. Lepage publicly apologized for the incident the next day saying "I made a huge driver error by blending onto the racetrack in the wrong area. This caused a multi-car accident and changed the outcome of the race for many teams." Dale Earnhardt Jr. waited to make a last lap pass down the backstretch on Stewart but didn't have any drafting help, Dale would cross the finish line in sixth position.

Top ten finishers
Pos.	Car #	Driver	Make	Team
1	20	Tony Stewart	Toyota	Joe Gibbs Racing
2	64	David Stremme	Chevrolet	Rusty Wallace, Inc.
3	25	Bobby Hamilton Jr.	Ford	Team Rensi Motorsports
4	38	Jason Leffler	Toyota	Braun Racing
5	70	Mark Green	Chevrolet	ML Motorsports
6	5	Dale Earnhardt Jr.	Chevrolet	JR Motorsports
7	1	Mike Bliss	Chevrolet	Phoenix Racing
8	9	Patrick Carpentier (R)	Dodge	Gillett Evernham Motorsports
9	29	Scott Wimmer	Chevrolet	Richard Childress Racing
10	7	Mike Wallace	Toyota	Germain Racing
Average race speed: 133.111 mph (214.221 km/h)
Lead changes: 15 among 9 drivers
Cautions: 8 for 27 laps + (1 red flag)

Did not qualify: None, only 43 cars.

=== Lipton Tea 250 ===
The Lipton Tea 250 was held on May 2 at Richmond International Raceway in Richmond, Virginia. Kasey Kahne won the pole. The race, like the previous year's featured pit strategy as a key factor. Bryan Clauson (#41) spun out on lap 247 with only 3 laps left bringing out the eighth and final caution. Virginia native Denny Hamlin who was leading at the time of Clauson's spin made a pit stop during the caution for four fresh Goodyear tires. On the restart of a green–white–checkered finish Hamlin blew past Carl Edwards and race leader Kevin Harvick who both opted to not pit during the late race caution. It was Denny Hamlin's sixth Nationwide Series career win and also Joe Gibbs Racing's seventh Nationwide Series victory in 2008. Kyle Busch came from a lap down to finish third, even after Steve Wallace got into Busch on the final lap. Kyle retaliated at Wallace after the checkered flag and spun out fourth-place finisher David Ragan in the process. Busch and Wallace had a small altercation on pit road after the race. Wallace who was seated in his #66 Chevy grabbed Busch's helmet when Busch confronted him about the incident.

Top ten finishers
Pos.	Car #	Driver	Make	Team
1	20	Denny Hamlin	Toyota	Joe Gibbs Racing
2	33	Kevin Harvick	Chevrolet	Kevin Harvick, Inc.
3	32	Kyle Busch	Toyota	Braun Racing
4	6	David Ragan	Ford	Roush Fenway Racing
5	66	Steve Wallace	Chevrolet	Rusty Wallace, Inc.
6	64	David Stremme	Chevrolet	Rusty Wallace, Inc.
7	60	Carl Edwards	Ford	Roush Fenway Racing
8	1	Mike Bliss	Chevrolet	Phoenix Racing
9	2	Clint Bowyer	Chevrolet	Richard Childress Racing
10	29	Scott Wimmer	Toyota	Richard Childress Racing
Average race speed: 96.238 mph (154.880 km/h)
Lead changes: 3 among 4 drivers
Cautions: 8 for 41 laps

Did not qualify: Chad Beahr (#57).

=== Diamond Hill Plywood 200 ===
The Diamond Hill Plywood 200 was held on May 9 at Darlington Raceway in Darlington, South Carolina. Carl Edwards won the pole. Denny Hamlin who won the previous race and was the fastest in the two final practice sessions hit the wall on his qualifying lap and failed to qualify. Carl Edwards, who won the pole, chose to start on the outside of Bowyer, the second-place qualifier. But scraped the wall while racing Bowyer on the opening lap. Edwards' bad luck would continue when on lap 2 his #60 Ford blew the right-front tire and smacked the Turn 3 wall causing his race to end early. Matt Kenseth led Tony Stewart by more than two seconds with 46 laps left in the race but Kenseth made a pit stop on lap 121, complaining that his wheels were chattering. The crew put on four tires and sent Kenseth back on the track, but Kenseth wrecked in Turn 4 on lap 128 trying to catch the first car one lap down. The race was red flagged with 19 laps remaining as track crews cleaned up after Kenseth's wreck. David Ragan spun on lap 138 and hit the wall bringing out the seventh caution. Mark Martin's engine stalled on the restart with three laps remaining due to fuel pickup problems, triggering a six-car wreck, the race was red flagged again for cleanup. Stewart led the field to the restart of a green-white-checker finish on lap 148. Tony Stewart pulled away from Clint Bowyer and went on to win his first race at Darlington Raceway. It was Stewart's fourth victory in the 2008 Nationwide Series, and the sixth of his career. It marked the eighth win for Joe Gibbs Racing in the 2008 Nationwide Series, and the fourth consecutive victory for the team's #20 car.

Top ten finishers
Pos.	Car #	Driver	Make	Team
1	20	Tony Stewart	Toyota	Joe Gibbs Racing
2	2	Clint Bowyer	Chevrolet	Richard Childress Racing
3	99	David Reutimann	Toyota	Michael Waltrip Racing
4	03	Todd Bodine	Toyota	Germain Racing
5	66	Steve Wallace	Chevrolet	Rusty Wallace, Inc.
6	64	David Stremme	Chevrolet	Rusty Wallace, Inc.
7	11	Jason Keller	Chevrolet	CJM Racing
8	9	Chase Miller (R)	Dodge	Gillett Evernham Motorsports
9	38	Jason Leffler	Toyota	Braun Racing
10	59	Marcos Ambrose	Ford	JTG Racing
Average race speed: 107.139 mph (172.424 km/h)
Lead changes: 11 among 8 drivers
Cautions: 8 for 36 laps + (2 red flags)

Did not qualify: Brett Rowe (#05), Denny Hamlin (#18).

=== Carquest Auto Parts 300 ===
The Carquest Auto Parts 300 was held on May 24 at Lowe's Motor Speedway in Concord, North Carolina, a suburb of Charlotte. Brian Vickers won the pole. Kyle Busch driving for Braun Racing won the race, ending the four-race winning streak of Joe Gibbs Racing. During the final caution (#88) Brad Keselowski tapped (#20) Denny Hamlin's bumper as the cars circled the track behind the pace car. Keselowski was upset with the way Hamlin had raced him. Hamlin retaliated by turning right into Keselowski's Chevrolet, damaging the left-front fender. The move by Hamlin upset Dale Earnhardt Jr. owner of the #88 and driver of the #83 for this race only, who was running fourth right behind the #88. While still under caution Earnhardt drove up and tapped Hamlin's bumper. After the incident an angry post-race confrontation erupted between the #88 JR Motorsports crew and the #20 Gibbs crew. The confrontation resulted in three members of the JR Motorsports crew being fined by NASCAR and one member was also suspended for one race.

Top ten finishers
Pos.	Car #	Driver	Make	Team
1	32	Kyle Busch	Toyota	Braun Racing
2	20	Denny Hamlin	Toyota	Joe Gibbs Racing
3	88	Brad Keselowski	Chevrolet	JR Motorsports
4	83	Dale Earnhardt Jr.	Chevrolet	JR Motorsports
5	10	Brian Vickers	Toyota	Braun Racing
6	2	Clint Bowyer	Chevrolet	Richard Childress Racing
7	16	Greg Biffle	Ford	Roush Fenway Racing
8	29	Jeff Burton	Chevrolet	Richard Childress Racing
9	6	David Ragan	Ford	Roush Fenway Racing
10	5	Jimmie Johnson	Chevrolet	JR Motorsports
Average race speed: 120.331 mph (193.654 km/h)
Lead changes: 18 among 11 drivers
Cautions: 12 for 44 laps

Did not qualify: Burney Lamar (#37), Johnny Chapman (#90), Brett Rowe (#05).

=== Heluva Good! 200 ===
The Heluva Good! 200 was held on May 31 at Dover International Speedway in Dover, Delaware. Carl Edwards won the pole. The start of the race was delayed for three hours due to heavy rain. This race marked the much anticipated debut of 18-year-old driving sensation Joey Logano driving the #20 GameStop Toyota for Joe Gibbs Racing. Dario Franchitti made his first start since breaking his ankle in the Aaron's 312 at Talladega. Kyle Busch driving for Braun Racing led 68 laps, but various problems dropped him back in the field. Busch made a pit stop on Lap 105 while leading, but contact between his #32 Toyota and Brad Keselowski's #88 Chevrolet forced both cars back to pit road under the third caution of the race. Busch had rallied back to the eight position when on Lap 169, Braun Racing teammate Jason Leffler lost control of his car and knocked Busch into the Turn 2 wall. From then on, Denny Hamlin would hold off polesitter Edwards and David Stremme over the final 28 laps to win the race. It would be Joe Gibbs Racing's ninth victory in the 2008 Nationwide Series. Joey Logano was able to keep his car in one piece and finish sixth, despite making contact with Kasey Kahne on pit road early in the race.

Top ten finishers
Pos.	Car #	Driver	Make	Team
1	18	Denny Hamlin	Toyota	Joe Gibbs Racing
2	60	Carl Edwards	Ford	Roush Fenway Racing
3	64	David Stremme	Chevrolet	Rusty Wallace, Inc.
4	99	David Reutimann	Toyota	Michael Waltrip Racing
5	16	Greg Biffle	Ford	Roush Fenway Racing
6	20	Joey Logano (R)	Toyota	Joe Gibbs Racing
7	88	Brad Keselowski	Chevrolet	JR Motorsports
8	7	Mike Wallace	Toyota	Germain Racing
9	2	Clint Bowyer	Chevrolet	Richard Childress Racing
10	9	Kasey Kahne	Dodge	Gillett Evernham Motorsports
Average race speed: 112.395 mph (180.882 km/h)
Lead changes: 5 among 3 drivers
Cautions: 6 for 26 laps

Did not qualify: Dominick Casola (#02).

=== Federated Auto Parts 300 ===
The Federated Auto Parts 300 presented by Dollar General was held on June 7 at Nashville Superspeedway in Lebanon, Tennessee. The 18-year-old phenom Joey Logano won the pole in his second ever start. Logano led early for 60 laps. Though Logano, Clint Bowyer, David Reutimann, and others headed for the pits on Lap 79, Brad Keselowski stayed out. This move put Keselowski on a different fuel strategy, pitting late with 41 laps to go instead of pitting with the rest of the field with 77 to go. On lap 89 Logano was taken out of contention during a four wide race through Turn 4. His #20 Toyota was clipped by Greg Biffle's Ford, turning him sideways into Busch's car before shooting up the track and into the outside wall. Late in the race fuel became an issue as Reutimann appeared to have his second Nationwide career win in the bag while being pursued by Bowyer and Kyle Busch. However, a caution brought out by a spinning Brad Teague ruined Reutimann's hopes of victory, as he was passed by Bowyer and Busch on the restart with 8 laps to go. As Bowyer made contact with Reutimann, Keselowski made his move to the inside of Bowyer, taking the lead and eventually his first ever win in his 49th start.

Top ten finishers
Pos.	Car #	Driver	Make	Team
1	88	Brad Keselowski	Chevrolet	JR Motorsports
2	64	David Stremme	Chevrolet	Rusty Wallace, Inc.
3	99	David Reutimann	Toyota	Michael Waltrip Racing
4	2	Clint Bowyer	Chevrolet	Richard Childress Racing
5	6	David Ragan	Ford	Roush Fenway Racing
6	7	Mike Wallace	Toyota	Germain Racing
7	29	Scott Wimmer	Chevrolet	Richard Childress Racing
8	47	Kelly Bires	Ford	JTG Racing
9	5	Landon Cassill (R)	Chevrolet	JR Motorsports
10	16	Greg Biffle	Ford	Roush Fenway Racing
Average race speed: 117.643 mph (189.328 km/h)
Lead changes: 10 among 8 drivers
Cautions: 10 for 41 laps

Did not qualify: Brian Keselowski (#92), Brett Rowe (#05), Ryan Hackett (#76).

=== Meijer 300 ===
The Meijer 300 presented by Oreo was held on June 14 at Kentucky Speedway in Sparta, Kentucky. 18-year-old phenom Joey Logano won the pole. From the drop of the green, Logano and teammate Kyle Busch dominated the race, leading a combined total of 116 laps, with Busch leading a race high 85 laps. It would be the Logano and Busch show until lap 163 when Busch spun coming out of turn 2. From there, Logano went on to win the race, becoming the youngest winner in the NASCAR Nationwide Series at only 18 years and 21 days, beating Casey Atwood's long standing record of 18 years, 10 months and 9 days set when he won at Milwaukee in 1999.

Top ten finishers
Pos.	Car #	Driver	Make	Team
1	20	Joey Logano (R)	Toyota	Joe Gibbs Racing
2	29	Scott Wimmer	Chevrolet	Richard Childress Racing
3	7	Mike Wallace	Toyota	Germain Racing
4	88	Brad Keselowski	Chevrolet	JR Motorsports
5	40	Bryan Clauson (R)	Dodge	Chip Ganassi Racing
6	59	Marcos Ambrose	Ford	JTG Racing
7	6	David Ragan	Ford	Roush Fenway Racing
8	1	Mike Bliss	Chevrolet	Phoenix Racing
9	2	Clint Bowyer	Chevrolet	Richard Childress Racing
10	11	Jason Keller	Chevrolet	CJM Racing
Average race speed: 135.508 mph (218.079 km/h)
Lead changes: 14 among 8 drivers
Cautions: 5 for 25 laps

Did not qualify: Danny O'Quinn Jr. (#05).

=== Camping World RV Rental 250 ===
The Camping World RV Rental 250 was held on June 21 at The Milwaukee Mile in West Allis, Wisconsin. The defending 2007 NASCAR Busch Series champion, Carl Edwards, won the event, end his 36-winless streak drought. Edwards had started in the back, due to not making to the track for qualifying. Last week's winner, Joey Logano finished a hard strong 2nd, while points leader, Clint Bowyer finished 3rd.

Top ten finishers
Pos.	Car #	Driver	Make	Team
1	60	Carl Edwards	Ford	Roush Fenway Racing
2	20	Joey Logano (R)	Toyota	Joe Gibbs Racing
3	2	Clint Bowyer	Chevrolet	Richard Childress Racing
4	6	David Ragan	Ford	Roush Fenway Racing
5	99	David Reutimann	Toyota	Michael Waltrip Racing
6	29	Scott Wimmer	Chevrolet	Richard Childress Racing
7	1	Mike Bliss	Chevrolet	Phoenix Racing
8	88	Brad Keselowski	Chevrolet	JR Motorsports
9	11	Jason Keller	Chevrolet	CJM Racing
10	38	Jason Leffler	Toyota	Braun Racing
Average race speed: 91.678 mph (147.541 km/h)
Lead changes: 12 among 9 drivers
Cautions: 9 for 34 laps

Did not qualify: Rubén Pardo (#36), Kenny Hendrick (#31), Andy Ponstein (#02), Chad Chaffin (#55), Mike Harmon (#84).

=== Camping World RV Sales 200 presented by RVs.com ===
The Camping World RV Sales 200 presented by RVs.com was held on June 28 at the New Hampshire Motor Speedway in Loudon, New Hampshire. Landon Cassill won the pole but started from the rear due to an engine change. Cassill gained 28 positions but on Lap 47 a tap from Bobby Hamilton Jr. sent his #5 Chevy into the wall and ended his day. He finished 34th. Tony Stewart who started 8th dominated the race in the #20 Joe Gibbs Racing Toyota leading 75 of the 200 laps. Fellow Joe Gibbs driver Kyle Busch also fared well starting 4th and leading 63 laps eventually finishing 3rd. David Reutimann led 25 laps and managed a 7th-place finish in his Michael Waltrip Racing Toyota. Nationwide points leader Clint Bowyer started 2nd and led 36 laps before finishing 9th. Greg Biffle crashed on the last lap causing the race to end under caution with Stewart, Hamlin and Busch claiming the top 3 spots. The race marked the first 1–2–3 Nationwide Series finish for Toyota. Stewart's win was the eighth of the season for the #20 Joe Gibbs Racing Toyota.

Top ten finishers
Pos.	Car #	Driver	Make	Team
1	20	Tony Stewart	Toyota	Joe Gibbs Racing
2	32	Denny Hamlin	Toyota	Braun Racing
3	18	Kyle Busch	Toyota	Joe Gibbs Racing
4	33	Kevin Harvick	Chevrolet	Kevin Harvick, Inc.
5	60	Carl Edwards	Ford	Roush Fenway Racing
6	6	David Ragan	Ford	Roush Fenway Racing
7	99	David Reutimann	Toyota	Michael Waltrip Racing
8	1	Mike Bliss	Chevrolet	Phoenix Racing
9	2	Clint Bowyer	Chevrolet	Richard Childress Racing
10	88	Brad Keselowski	Chevrolet	JR Motorsports
Average race speed: 109.025 mph (175.459 km/h)
Lead changes: 11 among 5 drivers
Cautions: 5 for 22 laps

Did not qualify: Justin Hobgood (#91).

NOTE: NASCAR announced on July 2 that Chad Walter crew chief for the #5 JR Motorsports team had been fined due to a rule violation during the Nationwide Series event at New Hampshire on June 28. Walter was fined $10,000 and placed on NASCAR probation until December 31 due to the use of improper language by a crew chief during a televised interview of the race. After a wreck between Bobby Hamilton Jr. and the #5 driver Landon Cassill, Walter said "Shit happens" in an interview with an ESPN reporter. Rick Hendrick, listed owner of the #5 Chevy, was penalized with the loss of 25 Nationwide Series car owner points while Cassill was docked 25 Nationwide Series driver points.

=== Winn-Dixie 250 ===
The Winn-Dixie 250 powered by Coca-Cola was held on July 4 at Daytona International Speedway in Daytona Beach, Florida. Denny Hamlin won the race.

Top ten finishers
Pos.	Car #	Driver	Make	Team
1	20	Denny Hamlin	Toyota	Joe Gibbs Racing
2	18	Kyle Busch	Toyota	Joe Gibbs Racing
3	5	Dale Earnhardt Jr.	Chevrolet	JR Motorsports
4	2	Clint Bowyer	Chevrolet	Richard Childress Racing
5	88	Brad Keselowski	Chevrolet	JR Motorsports
6	9	Kasey Kahne	Dodge	Gillett Evernham Motorsports
7	29	Scott Wimmer	Chevrolet	Richard Childress Racing
8	64	David Stremme	Chevrolet	Rusty Wallace, Inc.
9	6	David Ragan	Ford	Roush Fenway Racing
10	1	Mike Bliss	Chevrolet	Phoenix Racing
Average race speed: 155.761 mph (250.673 km/h)
Lead changes: 17 among 10 drivers
Cautions: 3 for 10 laps

Did not qualify: Justin Hobgood (#91), Justin Ashburn (#05).

NOTE: Race extended 5 laps / 12.5 miles due to a green-white-checker finish.

=== Dollar General 300 ===
The Dollar General 300 powered by Coca-Cola was held on July 11 at Chicagoland Speedway in Joliet, Illinois. Sprint Cup Series regular David Reutimann won the pole. Denny Hamlin started the race in 41st position after a mechanical problem in qualifying forced him to start from the rear. Hamlin rallied back and finished 2nd having one of the fastest cars near the end of the race. Tony Stewart missed a shift at the start of the race causing Kevin Harvick to slam into the back of Stewart's car taking both drivers out of contention for the win. The first caution flag flew on Lap 56 when Jason Leffler spun into the infield grass during green flag pit stops. The second caution was brought out on Lap 63 when Matt Kenseth's #17 car spun coming off Turn 4. The third and final caution came out for debris from Tony Stewart's #20 car. The race stayed green setting a record average speed, Kyle Busch had a 3.120 second advantage over Denny Hamlin when he took the checkered flag. The win was Busch's fifth 2008 Nationwide victory, and the 16th of his career. The win gave Joe Gibbs Racing a series record tying 13 wins in a single season, matching in 20 races the 13 wins Richard Childress Racing scored in all of 2007.

Top ten finishers
Pos.	Car #	Driver	Make	Team
1	18	Kyle Busch	Toyota	Joe Gibbs Racing
2	32	Denny Hamlin	Toyota	Braun Racing
3	88	Brad Keselowski	Chevrolet	JR Motorsports
4	10	Brian Vickers	Toyota	Braun Racing
5	99	David Reutimann	Toyota	Michael Waltrip Racing
6	16	Greg Biffle	Ford	Roush Fenway Racing
7	2	Clint Bowyer	Chevrolet	Richard Childress Racing
8	29	Jeff Burton	Chevrolet	Richard Childress Racing
9	20	Tony Stewart	Toyota	Joe Gibbs Racing
10	5	Landon Cassill (R)	Chevrolet	JR Motorsports
Average race speed:
Lead changes: 10 among 6 drivers
Cautions: 3 for 15 laps

Did not qualify: Jeremy Clements (#50), Robert Richardson Jr. (#23), Kevin Lepage (#43), Brian Keselowski (#92), Morgan Shepherd (#89), Chad Blount (#36), Justin Hobgood (#91).

- Kevin Lepage replaced Brad Teague in the #52 car in the race, after failing to qualify his #43.

=== Missouri-Illinois Dodge Dealers 250 ===
The Missouri-Illinois Dodge Dealers 250 was held on July 19 at Gateway International Raceway in Madison, Illinois. Carl Edwards was the winner.

Top ten finishers
Pos.	Car #	Driver	Make	Team
1	60	Carl Edwards	Ford	Roush Fenway Racing
2	20	Joey Logano	Toyota	Joe Gibbs Racing
3	11	Jason Keller	Chevrolet	CJM Racing
4	10	Jason Leffler	Toyota	Braun Racing
5	88	Brad Keselowski	Chevrolet	JR Motorsports
6	5	Landon Cassill (R)	Chevrolet	JR Motorsports
7	32	James Buescher	Toyota	Braun Racing
8	2	Clint Bowyer	Chevrolet	Richard Childress Racing
9	64	David Stremme	Chevrolet	Rusty Wallace, Inc.
10	6	David Ragan	Ford	Roush Fenway Racing
Average race speed: 108.095 MPH
Lead changes: 12 among 9 drivers
Cautions: 6 for 25 laps

Did not qualify: Brad Baker (#37), Andy Ponstein (#02), Kevin Lepage (#84), Nick Tucker (#57).

=== Kroger 200 ===
The Kroger 200 was held on July 26 at O'Reilly Raceway Park in Clermont, Indiana. Kyle Busch was the overall winner.

Top ten finishers
Pos.	Car #	Driver	Make	Team
1	18	Kyle Busch	Toyota	Joe Gibbs Racing
2	16	Colin Braun	Ford	Roush Fenway Racing
3	1	Mike Bliss	Chevrolet	Phoenix Racing
4	29	Scott Wimmer	Chevrolet	Richard Childress Racing
5	22	Josh Wise	Dodge	Fitz Motorsports
6	33	Cale Gale (R)	Chevrolet	Kevin Harvick, Inc.
7	5	Landon Cassill (R)	Chevrolet	JR Motorsports
8	20	Joey Logano	Toyota	Joe Gibbs Racing
9	6	David Ragan	Ford	Roush Fenway Racing
10	66	Steve Wallace	Chevrolet	Rusty Wallace, Inc.
Average race speed: 80.522 MPH
Lead changes: 4 among 3 drivers
Cautions: 7 for 35 laps

Did not qualify: Charles Lewandoski (#36), Andy Ponstein (#02), Chad Beahr (#57).

=== NAPA Auto Parts 200 presented by Dodge ===
The NAPA Auto Parts 200 was held on August 2 at the Circuit Gilles Villeneuve. The race became the first NASCAR race in history to be run in the rain, as cars were fitted with rain tires and windshield-wipers. Despite these advantages, the race was eventually red-flagged and was soon called after 48 of the scheduled 74 laps. Although Marcos Ambrose dominated the race in the #59 for a second-straight year, he got penalized for speeding on pit road which gave the lead to Canadian Ron Fellows. Fellows held it to the end and was declared the winner, his final NASCAR Nationwide Series win of his racing career, plus his final win in any form of division in NASCAR. During an earlier caution for rain, Carl Edwards was seen using what looked to be a floor mop to try and clean his windshield; he was given it to combat the windshield fogging up on the inside.

Top ten finishers
Pos	Car #	Driver	Make	Team
1	5	Ron Fellows	Chevrolet	JR Motorsports
2	9	Patrick Carpentier	Dodge	Gillett Evernham Motorsports
3	59	Marcos Ambrose	Ford	JTG Racing
4	33	Ron Hornaday Jr.	Chevrolet	Kevin Harvick, Inc.
5	25	Boris Said	Ford	Rensi-No Fear
6	60	Carl Edwards	Ford	Roush Fenway Racing
7	38	Jason Leffler	Toyota	Braun Racing
8	16	Greg Biffle	Ford	Roush Fenway Racing
9	2	Clint Bowyer	Chevrolet	Richard Childress Racing
10	66	Steve Wallace	Chevrolet	Rusty Wallace, Inc.
Average race speed: 50.149 MPH
Lead changes: 3 among 3 drivers
Cautions: 4 for 12 laps

Did not qualify: Kevin O'Connell (#09).

=== Zippo 200 at the Glen ===
The Zippo 200 was held on August 9 at Watkins Glen International. Marcos Ambrose was the overall winner, becoming the first Australian winner in NASCAR history. Dario Franchitti became the first Scottish driver to win a NASCAR pole position and the first Scotsman to lead laps in a NASCAR Nationwide Series race, finishing 5th.

Top ten finishers
Pos	Car #	Driver	Make	Team
1	59	Marcos Ambrose	Ford	JTG Racing
2	92	Kyle Busch	Toyota	D'Hondt Motorsports
3	17	Matt Kenseth	Ford	Roush Fenway Racing
4	33	Kevin Harvick	Chevrolet	Kevin Harvick, Inc.
5	40	Dario Franchitti	Dodge	Chip Ganassi Racing
6	88	Brad Keselowski	Chevrolet	JR Motorsports
7	20	Joey Logano	Toyota	Joe Gibbs Racing
8	38	Jason Leffler	Toyota	Braun Racing
9	6	David Ragan	Ford	Roush Fenway Racing
10	27	Brad Coleman	Ford	Baker Curb Racing
Average race speed: 85.954 MPH
Lead changes: 11 among 9 drivers
Cautions: 6 for 15 laps

Did not qualify: Burney Lamar (#05), Kenny Hendrick (#31), Derrike Cope (#49), Larry Gunselman (#0), Alex Garcia (#98).

=== Carfax 250 ===
The Carfax 250 was held on August 16 at Michigan International Speedway.

Top ten finishers
Pos.	Car #	Driver	Make	Team
1	60	Carl Edwards	Ford	Roush Fenway Racing
2	32	Brian Vickers	Toyota	Braun Racing
3	20	Tony Stewart	Toyota	Joe Gibbs Racing
4	5	Mark Martin	Chevrolet	JR Motorsports
5	16	Greg Biffle	Ford	Roush Fenway Racing
6	1	Mike Bliss	Chevrolet	Phoenix Racing
7	18	Joey Logano	Toyota	Joe Gibbs Racing
8	38	Jason Leffler	Toyota	Braun Racing
9	47	Kelly Bires	Ford	JTG Racing
10	2	Clint Bowyer	Chevrolet	Richard Childress Racing
Average race speed: 136.571 MPH
Lead changes: 10 among 6 drivers
Cautions: 6 for 21 laps

Did not qualify: Larry Gunselman (#0), Kertus Davis (#49), Michael Guerity (#57), Jeremy Clements (#50).

=== Food City 250 ===
The Food City 250 was held on August 22 at Bristol Motor Speedway. Brad Keselowski was the overall winner.

Top ten finishers
Pos.	Car #	Driver	Make	Team
1	88	Brad Keselowski	Chevrolet	JR Motorsports
2	2	Clint Bowyer	Chevrolet	Richard Childress Racing
3	16	Greg Biffle	Ford	Roush Fenway Racing
4	33	Cale Gale	Chevrolet	Kevin Harvick, Inc.
5	64	David Stremme	Chevrolet	Rusty Wallace, Inc.
6	29	Scott Wimmer	Chevrolet	Richard Childress Racing
7	18	Kyle Busch	Toyota	Joe Gibbs Racing
8	99	David Reutimann	Toyota	Michael Waltrip Racing
9	10	Brian Vickers	Toyota	Braun Racing
10	66	Steve Wallace	Chevrolet	Rusty Wallace, Inc.
Average race speed: 93.509 MPH
Lead changes: 4 among 3 drivers
Cautions: 7 for 35 laps

Did not qualify: Kertus Davis (#49), John Wes Townley (#09), Morgan Shepherd (#89), Kenny Hendrick (#34), Nick Tucker (#78), Johnny Chapman (#90), Brian Keselowski (#92), Ryan Hackett (#76), Mike Harmon (#84).

=== Camping World RV Service 300 presented by Coleman ===
The Camping World RV Service 300 was held on August 30 at Auto Club Speedway. Kyle Busch was the overall winner.

Top ten finishers
Pos.	Car #	Driver	Make	Team
1	18	Kyle Busch	Toyota	Joe Gibbs Racing
2	60	Carl Edwards	Ford	Roush Fenway Racing
3	32	Brian Vickers	Toyota	Braun Racing
4	29	Jeff Burton	Chevrolet	Richard Childress Racing
5	17	Jamie McMurray	Ford	Roush Fenway Racing
6	20	Joey Logano	Toyota	Joe Gibbs Racing
7	2	Clint Bowyer	Chevrolet	Richard Childress Racing
8	99	David Reutimann	Toyota	Michael Waltrip Racing
9	6	David Ragan	Ford	Roush Fenway Racing
10	64	David Stremme	Chevrolet	Rusty Wallace, Inc.
Average race speed: 144.212 MPH
Lead changes: 7 among 6 drivers
Cautions: 5 for 15 laps

Did not qualify: Mike Harmon (#84).

=== Emerson Radio 250 ===
The Emerson Radio 250 was held on September 7 at Richmond International Raceway. Carl Edwards was the overall winner.

Top ten finishers
Pos.	Car #	Driver	Make	Team
1	60	Carl Edwards	Ford	Roush Fenway Racing
2	29	Scott Wimmer	Chevrolet	Richard Childress Racing
3	2	Clint Bowyer	Chevrolet	Richard Childress Racing
4	18	Denny Hamlin	Toyota	Joe Gibbs Racing
5	6	David Ragan	Ford	Roush Fenway Racing
6	16	Greg Biffle	Ford	Roush Fenway Racing
7	20	Joey Logano	Toyota	Joe Gibbs Racing
8	33	Kevin Harvick	Chevrolet	Kevin Harvick, Inc.
9	64	David Stremme	Chevrolet	Rusty Wallace, Inc.
10	32	Kyle Busch	Toyota	Braun Racing
Average race speed: 90.787 MPH
Lead changes: 7 among 5 drivers
Cautions: 9 for 50 laps

Did not qualify: Larry Gunselman (#0).

=== Camping World RV Sales 200 ===
The Camping World RV Sales 200 was held September 20 at Dover International Speedway. Kyle Busch won the pole and then went on to win the race.

Top ten finishers
Pos.	Car #	Driver	Make	Team
1	18	Kyle Busch	Toyota	Joe Gibbs Racing
2	1	Mike Bliss	Chevrolet	Phoenix Racing
3	88	Brad Keselowski	Chevrolet	JR Motorsports
4	29	Scott Wimmer	Chevrolet	Richard Childress Racing
5	60	Carl Edwards	Ford	Roush Fenway Racing
6	32	Denny Hamlin	Toyota	Braun Racing
7	38	Jason Leffler	Toyota	Braun Racing
8	17	Jamie McMurray	Ford	Roush Fenway Racing
9	6	David Ragan	Ford	Roush Fenway Racing
10	2	Clint Bowyer	Chevrolet	Richard Childress Racing
Average race speed: 107.084 mph (172.335 km/h)
Lead changes: 5 among 4 drivers
Cautions: 7 for 34 laps

Did not qualify: None, only 43 entries.

=== Kansas Lottery 300 ===
The Kansas Lottery 300 was held on September 27 at Kansas Speedway in Kansas City, Kansas. Denny Hamlin is the race winner.

Top ten finishers
Pos.	Car #	Driver	Make	Team
1	18	Denny Hamlin	Toyota	Joe Gibbs Racing
2	2	Clint Bowyer	Chevrolet	Richard Childress Racing
3	6	David Ragan	Ford	Roush Fenway Racing
4	60	Carl Edwards	Ford	Roush Fenway Racing
5	17	Matt Kenseth	Ford	Roush Fenway Racing
6	88	Brad Keselowski	Chevrolet	JR Motorsports
7	9	Kasey Kahne	Dodge	Gillett Evernham Motorsports
8	38	Jason Leffler	Toyota	Braun Racing
9	20	Joey Logano	Toyota	Joe Gibbs Racing
10	47	Kelly Bires	Ford	JTG Racing
Average race speed: 122.296 mph (196.816 km/h)
Lead changes: 10 among 8 drivers
Cautions: 6 for 31 laps

Did not qualify: Johnny Chapman (#90), Brian Keselowski (#92), Mike Harmon (#84), Larry Gunselman (#0).

=== Dollar General 300 ===
The Dollar General 300 was held on October 10 at Lowe's Motor Speedway in Concord, North Carolina. Kyle Busch was the winner.

Top ten finishers
Pos.	Car #	Driver	Make	Team
1	18	Kyle Busch	Toyota	Joe Gibbs Racing
2	29	Jeff Burton	Chevrolet	Richard Childress Racing
3	32	Brian Vickers	Toyota	Braun Racing
4	2	Clint Bowyer	Chevrolet	Richard Childress Racing
5	60	Carl Edwards	Ford	Roush Fenway Racing
6	33	Kevin Harvick	Chevrolet	Kevin Harvick, Inc.
7	47	Kelly Bires	Ford	JTG Racing
8	88	Brad Keselowski	Chevrolet	JR Motorsports
9	17	Jamie McMurray	Ford	Roush Fenway Racing
10	7	Mike Wallace	Toyota	Germain Racing
Average race speed: 103.647 mph (166.804 km/h)
Lead changes: 12 among 7 drivers
Cautions: 13 for 58 laps

Did not qualify: Mark Green (#70), Kertus Davis (#49), Kenny Hendrick (#93), Andy Ponstein (#02), Morgan Shepherd (#89), Johnny Sauter (#78), Josh Wise (#00), Larry Gunselman (#0), Justin Marks (#03), Robert Richardson Jr. (#23).

=== Kroger on Track for the Cure 250 presented by the Southern Dodge Dealers ===
The Kroger On Track for the Cure 250 was held on October 25 at Memphis Motorsports Park in Millington, Tennessee, a suburb of Memphis. Carl Edwards was the winner. Kenny Wallace suffered a 100-point penalty for unapproved adjustments found in his car during post-race inspection.

Top ten finishers
Pos.	Car #	Driver	Make	Team
1	60	Carl Edwards	Ford	Roush Fenway Racing
2	99	David Reutimann	Toyota	Michael Waltrip Racing
3	28	Kenny Wallace	Chevrolet	Jay Robinson Racing
4	21	Austin Dillon	Chevrolet	Richard Childress Racing
5	20	Joey Logano	Toyota	Joe Gibbs Racing
6	9	Chase Miller	Dodge	Gillett Evernham Motorsports
7	1	Mike Bliss	Chevrolet	Phoenix Racing
8	6	David Ragan	Ford	Roush Fenway Racing
9	66	Steve Wallace	Chevrolet	Rusty Wallace, Inc.
10	64	David Stremme	Chevrolet	Rusty Wallace, Inc.
Average race speed: 88.783 mph (142.882 km/h)
Lead changes: 2 among 3 drivers
Cautions: 8 for 39 laps

Did not qualify: Johnny Chapman (#90), Stanton Barrett (#30), John Wes Townley (#09), Larry Gunselman (#0), Travis Kittleson (#56), Tim Weaver (#75).

- Stanton Barrett replaced Kenny Hendrick in the #31 car in the race, after failing to qualify his #30.

=== O'Reilly Challenge ===
The O'Reilly Challenge was held on November 1 at Texas Motor Speedway in Fort Worth, Texas, a suburb of Dallas. Kyle Busch was the winner.

Top ten finishers
Pos.	Car #	Driver	Make	Team
1	18	Kyle Busch	Toyota	Joe Gibbs Racing
2	60	Carl Edwards	Ford	Roush Fenway Racing
3	5	Mark Martin	Chevrolet	JR Motorsports
4	20	Joey Logano	Toyota	Joe Gibbs Racing
5	6	David Ragan	Ford	Roush Fenway Racing
6	2	Clint Bowyer	Chevrolet	Richard Childress Racing
7	88	Brad Keselowski	Chevrolet	JR Motorsports
8	99	David Reutimann	Toyota	Michael Waltrip Racing
9	59	Marcos Ambrose	Ford	JTG Racing
10	64	David Stremme	Chevrolet	Rusty Wallace, Inc.
Average race speed: 140.9 mph (226.8 km/h)
Lead changes: 10 among 4 drivers
Cautions: 5 for 20 laps

Did not qualify: Morgan Shepherd (#89), Burney Lamar (#05), John Wes Townley (#09), Kenny Hendrick (#31), Justin Hobgood (#91), Johnny Sauter (#78), Mike Harmon (#84).

=== Hefty Odor Block 200 ===
The Hefty Odor Block 200 was held on November 8 at Phoenix International Raceway in Avondale, Arizona, a suburb of Phoenix. Carl Edwards was the winner.

Top ten finishers
Pos.	Car #	Driver	Make	Team
1	60	Carl Edwards	Ford	Roush Fenway Racing
2	18	Denny Hamlin	Toyota	Joe Gibbs Racing
3	33	Kevin Harvick	Chevrolet	Kevin Harvick, Inc.
4	2	Clint Bowyer	Chevrolet	Richard Childress Racing
5	32	Kyle Busch	Toyota	Braun Racing
6	5	Landon Cassill (R)	Chevrolet	JR Motorsports
7	17	Jamie McMurray	Ford	Roush Fenway Racing
8	1	Mike Bliss	Chevrolet	Phoenix Racing
9	7	Mike Wallace	Toyota	Germain Racing
10	20	Joey Logano	Toyota	Joe Gibbs Racing
Average race speed: 95.374 mph (153.490 km/h)
Lead changes: 6 among 6 drivers
Cautions: 9 for 41 laps

Did not qualify: Kevin Lepage (#73), Stan Silva Jr. (#65), Derrike Cope (#82), Danny Efland (#0), Kenny Hendrick (#31), Jason White (#78), Morgan Shepherd (#89).

=== Ford 300 ===
The Ford 300 was held November 15 at Homestead–Miami Speedway in Homestead, Florida, a suburb of Miami. Edwards wins the race. Clint Bowyer wins his first championship.

Top ten finishers
Pos.	Car #	Driver	Make	Team
1	60	Carl Edwards	Ford	Roush Fenway Racing
2	18	Kyle Busch	Toyota	Joe Gibbs Racing
3	88	Brad Keselowski	Chevrolet	JR Motorsports
4	38	Jason Leffler	Toyota	Braun Racing
5	2	Clint Bowyer	Chevrolet	Richard Childress Racing
6	21	Scott Wimmer	Chevrolet	Richard Childress Racing
7	32	Denny Hamlin	Toyota	Braun Racing
8	5	Dale Earnhardt Jr.	Chevrolet	JR Motorsports
9	6	Kelly Bires	Ford	JTG Racing
10	20	Joey Logano	Toyota	Joe Gibbs Racing
Average race speed: 117.340 mph (188.840 km/h)
Lead changes: 10 among 8 drivers
Cautions: 8 for 38 laps

Did not qualify: Stanton Barrett (#30), Casey Atwood (#05), Danny O'Quinn Jr. (#35), Mark Green (#70), Robert Richardson Jr. (#23), John Wes Townley (#09), Kevin Lepage (#73), Morgan Shepherd (#89), Derrike Cope (#78).

== Final standings ==
=== Full Drivers' Championship ===
(key) Bold – Pole position awarded by time. Italics – Pole position set by owner's points. * – Most laps led.

Pos	Driver	DAY	CAL	LVS	ATL	BRI	NSH	TEX	PHO	MXC	TAL	RCH	DAR	CLT	DOV	NSH	KEN	MIL	NHA	DAY	CHI	GTY	IRP	CGV	GLN	MCH	BRI	CAL	RCH	DOV	KAN	CLT	MEM	TEX	PHO	HOM	Pts
1	Clint Bowyer	25	9	3	19	1*	2	3	8	6	25	9	2	6	9	4*	9	3	9	4	7	8	18	9	23	10	2*	7	3*	10	2	4	16	6	4	5	5132
2	Carl Edwards	10	5	14	4	14	3	13	2	4	31	7*	**43**	13	**2**	13	20	1	5	11	16	1*	11	6	25	**1***	37	2	1	5	4	5	1*	**2**	1*	1	5111
3	Brad Keselowski	16	32	23	6	4	4	15	12	8	23	11	15	3	7	1	4	**8***	10	5	3	5	19	12	6	11	1	33	21	3	6	8	17	7	21	3	4794
4	David Ragan	9	12	10	16	8	21	8	5	22	18	4	27	9	29	5	7	4	6	9	13	10	9	13	9	36	25	9	5	9	3	12	8	5	14	23	4525
5	Mike Bliss	17	13	26	7	5	11	24	6	9	7	8	14	15	18	12	8	7	8	10	11	31	3	19	13	6	13	12	11	2	12	19	7	27	8	14	4518
6	Kyle Busch	2*	2	31	24*	41	**16***	1*	**1***	1	16	3	31	1*	28	20	30		3	2	1*		1*		2		7	**1***	10	**1***	35	1*		1*	5	2*	4461
7	David Reutimann	14	4	25	10	3	9	14	9	11	20	18	3	11	4	3	13	5	7	14	**5**	25	26	18	15	34	8	8	34	17	16	24	2	8	31	13	4388
8	Mike Wallace	24	16	7	17	10	20	25	15	12	10	13	25	22	8	6	3	18	15	22	20	11	17	15	18	15	35	16	15	12	15	10	14	12	9	18	4128
9	Jason Leffler	19	11	39	8	6	13	9	14	21	4	16	9	32	27	26	16	10	32	23	27	4	16	7	8	8	15	26	30	7	8	18	12	17	25	4	4086
10	Marcos Ambrose	39	22	28	11	19	23	18	17	2	28	25	10	14	30	19	6	16	14	20	15	15	20	3*	1	12	34	15	13	16	11	15	15	9	24	31	3991
11	David Stremme	42	17	5	30	9	6	35	10		2	6	6	12	3	2	12	34	17	8	23	9	13			16	5	10	9	11	17	31	10	10	35	16	3887
12	Jason Keller	36	14	18	14	15	18	12	32	17	21	19	7	17	16	15	10	9	11	18	14	3	24	23	32	17	12	14	16	19	19	29	25	19	13	22	3873
13	Kelly Bires	12	30	15	12	20	5	17	19	31	36	20	24	33	13	8	19	11	22	16	12	32	36	24	17	9	17	13	20	34	10	7	18	22	17	9	3764
14	Steve Wallace	37	15	30	18	16	24	16	16	10	32	5	5	20	11	21	17	19	21	13	24	26	10	10	28	38	10	20	17	18	41	32	9	28	33	15	3615
15	Bobby Hamilton Jr.	22	20	12	23	17	10	23	13		3	17	30	18	14	30	21	15	16	15	19	20	14		16	18	18	19	14	15	25	37	21	16	18	21	3566
16	Kenny Wallace	DNQ	18	13	25	11	32	26	20	19	30	37	17	23	20	16	29	28	23	25	28	18	22	31	21	30	26	28	18	29	28	16	3	26	15	33	3121
17	Scott Wimmer	18				12	1			7	9	10			12	7	2	6	12	7		30	4	11		22	6		2	4			22	13	19	6	3002
18	Kevin Harvick	21	3	4	2	7		**34**	4			2	13	19	17				4	12	18				4			11	8	28	**13**	6		29	3		2936
19	Denny Hamlin	8	Wth			26	7		3		37	1	DNQ	2	1*				2	1*	2				34		36		4	6	1*			14	**2**	7	2758
20	Joey Logano														8	**31**	**1***	2				2	8	17	7	7	16	6	7	14	9	14	5	4	10	**10**	2555
21	Eric McClure	34	28	22	33	30	31	36	29		15	32	33	29	26	28	28	29	27	38	32	21	27			27	31	32	29	24	33	22	27	32	32	32	2429
22	Stanton Barrett	38		11		25		27		30			19	35	21	17	25	17	33	26	35	24		25	26	21	20	21	25	27	34	28	34	24	26	DNQ	2329
23	Brad Coleman	26	19	9	35	33	27	22	23	16	24	26	12	21	32	35	15	25	31	21	30	17	23	21	10												2271
24	D. J. Kennington	33	26	29	34	34	34	30	26	25	26	27	20			23		24	26	29	31			27		29	29		27			25	20	31	22	26	2099
25	Greg Biffle	7		2	21	13					11			7	5	10			19		6			8		5	3		6		18						2092
26	Landon Cassill **(R)**						19		22	23		23			25	9	11	22	**34**		10	6	7	14	31		22		12	25			13		6		2092
27	Bryan Clauson **(R)**	6	34		29	35	17					21	18	31	31	22	5	20		**19**			32					18	38	33	21	30			16	34	1915
28	Kevin Lepage	DNQ	23	17	27	18	29	31	28	24	35	29	26	26	35	29	24	26	24	24	34	DNQ				41	41	41		39	43	39	43	41	DNQ	DNQ	1895
29	Morgan Shepherd	DNQ	37	40	41	37	38	42	34	DNQ	13	28	16	37	22	24	43	37	25	31	DNQ	37	37	37	24	26	DNQ	34	36	22	24	DNQ	37	DNQ	DNQ	DNQ	1844
30	Mark Green	41				24	26	28			5	22				14	22	13		30	22	14	21			23	24		22		22	DNQ	30	20		DNQ	1835
31	Derrike Cope		36	32	37	36	40	37	35	DNQ		33	32	34	24	36	31	38	30	28	38	34	38	43	DNQ	25	39	30	31	32	37	43	26	34	DNQ	DNQ	1765
32	Jeff Burton		8	34	3			2	31				21	8							8				14*			4			14	2				35	1712
33	Josh Wise													24	19	33	23	33	20	33	25	16	5			14		22	35	13		DNQ	QL	11	23	12	1700
34	Kertus Davis	32	31	33	42	23	30	32	25	43	12	31	29	25	36	32	37	42	35	42	42	43	39			DNQ	DNQ	43	42	37	40	DNQ	39	43	42	41	1639
35	Dario Franchitti **(R)**	20	24	6	28	22		11	11		41				15				13		26				**5**	13	11										1571
36	Brian Vickers	4		**36**	22			6						**5**						37	4					2	9	3				3		37			1544
37	Cale Gale	23			20		8				22			30		34	18	12				12	6			19	**4**						11				1464
38	Chase Miller **(R)**						14		21					36		11	39	23				13	30					23				36	6	23		20	1386
39	Tony Stewart	**1**	1*	27				10			**1***		1*						1*		9					3											1354
40	Jamie McMurray		6		13			5	36													**27**						5		8		**9**		35	7	19	1331
41	Kasey Kahne	35			9	2		21				**14**		16	10					6											7	11					1277
42	Dale Earnhardt Jr.	3	7		15			7			6			4						3					30											8	1235
43	Danny Efland						37					41	35	43		39	42				33	38	31			28	30	27	37	26	26	23		33	DNQ	25	1152
44	Burney Lamar							40				39	34	DNQ	42	18	32	36	36		36			35	DNQ	37	27	35	39	35	32	38	38	DNQ	37		1114
45	Robert Richardson Jr.	31	25	19	32	32	35	29	30		19	34		38						32	DNQ					35					23	DNQ		36		DNQ	1105
46	Brandon Whitt																				41	28	35	38	40	32	33	25	28	23	27	21	28	40	30	38	1087
47	Johnny Chapman				38	38	39	39	38		39	42	38	DNQ	39	37	36	39	38	40	37	35	41			39	DNQ	39	43	38	DNQ	41	DNQ	39			1073
48	Brad Teague						41						22	28	37	27	27	30	28	43	QL	23	29				32		32				36			40	1020
49	Matt Kenseth	5			1							12	28								17				3						5						993
50	Patrick Carpentier **(R)**			8						5	8								18					2	22	33				20							987
51	Sam Hornish Jr.			DNQ		DNQ		19		13		15	11	39	23										36		14										799
52	Kenny Hendrick									38		43	36	41	40	40	34	DNQ	40		40	36	34		DNQ	43	DNQ	37	40	41	39	DNQ	QL	DNQ	DNQ	39	788
53	Brian Keselowski **(R)**		33	42	31	31						30				DNQ	35	27			DNQ	40	15			24	DNQ				DNQ		31			Wth	776
54	Johnny Sauter	13	21	16	26	21					43	24														42	42	42		40		DNQ	41	DNQ			752
55	Larry Gunselman	DNQ	42	38	39	39	42	41	39	41	43						41				43	42	42		DNQ	DNQ	38	36	DNQ	36	DNQ	DNQ	DNQ		36		737
56	James Buescher								18								14	14				7	28										**19**				692
57	Mark Martin			1*									23													4					38			3			663
58	Brett Rowe	DNQ	35	21	36	28	43	38	42	DNQ	27	36	DNQ	DNQ	33	DNQ							40														656
59	Scott Lagasse Jr.																													31	20	13	24	25	20	37	631
60	Stephen Leicht		10				12		7		34							QL															QL	18			577
61	Bobby Labonte	15		34	5	29		4																													575
62	Mike Harmon	DNQ	40	DNQ	40	40	36	43	40		17		37		43			DNQ	42	39							DNQ	DNQ			DNQ			DNQ			542
63	Colin Braun						15			33								21		35			**2**														515
64	Brad Baker	28	39	35		27	28							27						27		DNQ															508
65	Justin Hobgood															41	38		DNQ	DNQ	DNQ	39				40	43	38	41	42	42		40	DNQ	41		458
66	Andrew Ranger																							28			19		33		31	20					427
67	Kyle Krisiloff			43			25	33	24	29	33																										417
68	Johnny Borneman III		29	20					33																			29							28		398
69	Jimmie Johnson													10											29			17				33					396
70	Donnie Neuenberger	DNQ						DNQ			14				34					34						31				43				38			396
71	Elliott Sadler		27																		21						21		19								388
72	Justin Allgaier																															34		21	11	28	370
73	Robby Gordon							20	27												29				19												367
74	Max Papis									15														20	11												351
75	Andy Ponstein											40	39	40		38	33	DNQ	37		39	DNQ	DNQ									DNQ					343
76	Marc Davis																																23	30	27	27	331
77	Scott Gaylord								43	42														29				40			29				39		312
78	Boris Said									35														5	27												295
79	Scott Pruett									3*														**22**													277
80	Terry Cook												41		41			41					43									42			40	42	271
81	Ryan Newman																								12											11	262
82	Brian Simo									28														30	20												255
83	Kevin Hamlin																											24		21			35				249
84	Todd Bodine			37									4																							43	246
85	Austin Dillon																												26				4				245
86	Juan Pablo Montoya																																	15		17	230
87	Ron Hornaday Jr.									32														4													227
88	Travis Kittleson															25		31					33										DNQ				222
89	Mike Potter					43			41									32	29																		217
90	Dwayne Leik	QL	38	41	43						40						40																				214
91	Danny O'Quinn Jr.	DNQ				DNQ											DNQ												24			40	42	42	43	DNQ	205
92	John Wes Townley																										DNQ			30		27	DNQ	DNQ	38	DNQ	204
93	Casey Atwood																					33					40		23							DNQ	201
94	Shelby Howard																						20				23										197
95	David Gilliland	40																								20		31									191
96	Ron Fellows																							1													190
97	Wheeler Boys																							32	35								33				189
98	Rubén Pardo						DNQ			18			42			42		DNQ				41															186
99	Jeff Green											38															28					35					186
100	Martin Truex Jr.	11				41																															175
101	Randy MacDonald																		26				25														173
102	Jeremy Clements																QL				DNQ	22				DNQ										30	170
103	Patrick Sheltra																																		29	24	167
104	Alex García									27														26	DNQ												167
105	Reed Sorenson										29											29															157
106	Shane Huffman																			41		19															151
107	Willie Allen	29					33																														140
108	J. C. Stout														38			40	39																		138
109	A. J. Allmendinger																																		12		132
110	Adrián Fernández									14																											121
111	Jacques Villeneuve																							16													120
112	Michael McDowell	27																							42												119
113	Justin Ashburn										38							43	43	DNQ																	117
114	Antonio Pérez									34															37												113
115	Dave Blaney																															17					112
116	Stan Barrett																							39	33												110
117	Rafael Martínez									20																											103
118	Sterling Marlin						22																														97
119	Erik Darnell									26								QL																			85
120	Tony Raines																												QL			26					85
121	Carl Long												40	42																							80
122	Kirk Shelmerdine	30																																			78
123	Chris Cook									40															43												77
124	Dale Quarterley																							42	41												77
125	Ron Young																																29				76
126	David Green									QL																										29	76
127	Jennifer Jo Cobb																														30						73
128	Jarit Johnson																																32				67
129	Justin Marks																							33								DNQ					64
130	Trevor Boys																							34													61
131	Brian Ickler																																		34		61
132	Jerick Johnson						DNQ											35																			58
133	Ryan Hackett											35				DNQ											DNQ										58
134	Michel Jourdain Jr.									36																											55
135	James Hylton																			36																	55
136	Jeff Fuller																							36													55
137	Bobby Hillin Jr.																														36						55
138	Michael Annett																																			36	55
139	John Young								37																												52
140	Kevin O'Connell									37														DNQ													52
141	P. J. Jones																								38												49
142	José Luis Ramírez									39																											46
143	Stan Silva Jr.																								39										DNQ		46
144	Don Thomson Jr.																							40													43
145	Scott Lynch		41																																		40
146	Charles Lewandoski																		41				DNQ														40
147	Scott Steckly																							41													40
148	Steve Grissom	43																																			34
149	Shane Hall																43																				34
150	Kerry Earnhardt																			17																	
151	Joe Nemechek	DNQ																																			
152	Joe Fox									DNQ																											
153	Chad Beahr											DNQ						Wth					DNQ														
154	Dominick Casola														DNQ																						
155	Chad Chaffin																	DNQ																			
156	Chad Blount																				DNQ																
157	Nick Tucker																					DNQ					DNQ										
158	Michael Guerity																									DNQ											
159	Tim Weaver																																DNQ				
160	Jason White																																		DNQ		
161	Eric Norris		Wth																																		
162	Auggie Vidovich																	QL															QL				
163	Robert Pressley																	QL															QL				
164	Bobby East																																QL				
Pos	Driver	DAY	CAL	LVS	ATL	BRI	NSH	TEX	PHO	MXC	TAL	RCH	DAR	CLT	DOV	NSH	KEN	MIL	NHA	DAY	CHI	GTY	IRP	CGV	GLN	MCH	BRI	CAL	RCH	DOV	KAN	CLT	MEM	TEX	PHO	HOM	Pts

== See also ==
- 2008 NASCAR Sprint Cup Series
- 2008 NASCAR Craftsman Truck Series
- 2008 NASCAR Camping World East Series
- 2008 NASCAR Camping World West Series
- 2008 ARCA Re/Max Series
- 2008 NASCAR Whelen Modified Tour
- 2008 NASCAR Whelen Southern Modified Tour
- 2008 NASCAR Corona Series
- 2008 NASCAR Canadian Tire Series
