= Wheeler Boys =

Canadian racing driver (born 1982)

- Born: September 22, 1982 (age 44); Calgary, Alberta, Canada

NASCAR O'Reilly Auto Parts Series career
- 3 races run over 1 year
- 2008 position: 97th
- Best finish: 97th (2008)
- First race: 2008 NAPA Auto Parts 200 (Montreal)
- Last race: 2008 Kroger On Track for the Cure 250 (Memphis)
Wins	Top tens	Poles
0	0	0

NASCAR FedEx Freight Truck Series career
- 3 races run over 2 years
- 2012 position: NA
- Best finish: 91st (2009)
- First race: 2009 Kroger 200 (Martinsville)
- Last race: 2009 Ford 200 (Homestead)
Wins	Top tens	Poles
0	0	0

Wheeler Boys (born September 22, 1982) is a Canadian professional dirt track and stock car racing driver. He last competed part-time in the NASCAR Camping World Truck Series, driving the No. 50 for Boys Will Be Boys Racing.

== Racing career ==
Boys is from a racing pedigree; his father Trevor Boys and grandfather George Boys have competed in the NASCAR Cup Series. In 1998, he and his father formed Boys Will Be Boys Racing; at the age of 16, Boys began racing mini stock cars at Race City Motorsport Park in Calgary. He later competed in the CASCAR Super Series and NASCAR Nationwide Series before sponsorship issues forced the team to close. Wheeler and Trevor also raced together in various series, including the 2008 NAPA Auto Parts 200 Nationwide race at Circuit Gilles Villeneuve.

After ending his NASCAR career, Boys raced in Alberta's A-1 Autobody Outlaw Legends Dirt Series and has now began a new Alberta Wingless Sprint Car Series called the Iron Aces Sprint Cars. His career includes running wing sprint cars, IMCA Modifieds, late models and GT road race cars. His son Jaxon is also a dirt track racer.

== Motorsports career results ==
=== NASCAR ===
(key) (Bold – Pole position awarded by qualifying time. Italics – Pole position earned by points standings or practice time. * – Most laps led.)

==== Nationwide Series ====
NASCAR Nationwide Series results
Year	Team	No.	Make	1	2	3	4	5	6	7	8	9	10	11	12	13	14	15	16	17	18	19	20	21	22	23	24	25	26	27	28	29	30	31	32	33	34	35	NNSC	Pts	Ref
2008	JD Motorsports	0	Chevy	DAY	CAL	LVS	ATL	BRI	NSH	TEX	PHO	MXC	TAL	RCH	DAR	CLT	DOV	NSH	KEN	MLW	NHA	DAY	CHI	GTY	IRP	CGV; 32													97th	189	
2008	JD Motorsports	01	Chevy																								GLN; 35	MCH	BRI	CAL	RCH	DOV	KAN	CLT	MEM; 33	TEX	PHO	HOM	97th	189	

==== Camping World Truck Series ====
NASCAR Camping World Truck Series results
Year	Team	No.	Make	1	2	3	4	5	6	7	8	9	10	11	12	13	14	15	16	17	18	19	20	21	22	23	24	25	NCWTC	Pts	Ref
2009	Boys Will Be Boys Racing	50	Dodge	DAY	CAL	ATL	MAR	KAN	CLT	DOV	TEX	MCH	MLW	MEM	KEN	IRP	NSH	BRI	CHI	IOW	GTW	NHA	LVS	MAR; 35	TAL	TEX	PHO; 26	HOM; 28	91st	85	
2012	Mike Harmon Racing	74	Chevy	DAY; DNQ	MAR	CAR	KAN	CLT	DOV	TEX	KEN	IOW	CHI	POC	MCH	BRI	ATL	IOW	KEN	LVS	TAL	MAR	TEX	PHO	HOM				NA	-	

==== West Series ====
NASCAR West Series results
Year	Team	No.	Make	1	2	3	4	5	6	7	8	9	10	11	12	13	NWSC	Pts	Ref
2004	Boys Will Be Boys Racing	89	Ford	PHO	MMR	CAL	S99	EVG	IRW	S99	RMR; 14	DCS	PHO; 23	CNS	MMR	IRW	41st	215	

=== ARCA Re/Max Series ===
(key) (Bold – Pole position awarded by qualifying time. Italics – Pole position earned by points standings or practice time. * – Most laps led.)

ARCA Re/Max Series results
Year	Team	No.	Make	1	2	3	4	5	6	7	8	9	10	11	12	13	14	15	16	17	18	19	20	21	22	23	24	25	ARMC	Pts	Ref
2001	Wayne Peterson Racing	06	Chevy	DAY	NSH	WIN	SLM	GTY	KEN	CLT	KAN	MCH	POC	MEM	GLN; 34	KEN	MCH	POC	NSH	ISF	CHI	DSF	SLM	TOL	BLN	CLT	TAL	ATL	NA	-	

=== CASCAR ===
==== Super Series ====
CASCAR Super Series results
Year	Car owner	No.	Make	1	2	3	4	5	6	7	8	9	10	11	12	CSSC	Pts	Ref
2001	Boys Will Be Boys Racing	50	Dodge	DEL; 28	PET	MSP	MSP	KWA	TOR	ASE	CTR	HAM				34th	514	
2001		81	Ford										CAL; 25	VAN; 30	DEL; 30	34th	514	
2002	Boys Will Be Boys Racing	50	Dodge	DEL	PET	ASE	MSP	MSP	HAM	TOR	CAL; 33	VAN; 33	MNT	KWA	DEL	46th	352	
