= 2008 NAPA Auto Parts 200 =

Race details
- Race 23 of 35 in the 2008 NASCAR Nationwide Series season
- Circuit Gilles Villeneuve
- Date: August 2, 2008
- Location: Circuit Gilles Villeneuve, Montreal, Quebec
- Course: Permanent racing facility
- Course length: 2.709 miles (4.360 km)
- Distance: 48 laps, 130.032 mi (209.266 km)
- Scheduled distance: 74 laps, 200.466 mi (322.619 km)
- Weather: Mild with temperatures of 26.6 °C (79.9 °F); wind speeds of 4.9 kilometres per hour (3.0 mph)
- Average speed: 50.149 mph (80.707 km/h)
- Attendance: 60,000

Pole position
Driver	Scott Pruett	Chip Ganassi Racing
- Time: 102.568 sec

Most laps led
Driver	Marcos Ambrose	JTG Daugherty Racing
- Laps: 27

Winner
No. 5	Ron Fellows	JR Motorsports

Television in the United States
- Network: ESPN2
- Announcers: Marty Reid, Rusty Wallace, Randy LaJoie

The 2008 NAPA Auto Parts 200 presented by Dodge race was the second running of the NAPA Auto Parts 200, a discontinued NASCAR Nationwide Series race held on August 2, 2008, at Circuit Gilles Villeneuve in Montreal, Quebec. The race was the 23rd of the 2008 NASCAR Nationwide Series season.

The pole position was won by Scott Pruett of Chip Ganassi Racing, while the race was won by JR Motorsports' Ron Fellows. The race was the first points race in NASCAR history to be run with grooved rain tires.

== Background ==
The race was the second running of the NAPA Auto Parts 200, with Kevin Harvick winning the inaugural event in 2007. The track, Circuit Gilles Villeneuve, was one of two international tracks on the 2008 Nationwide schedule, along with Autódromo Hermanos Rodríguez in Mexico City.

Various road course ringers ran in the race, including Patrick Carpentier, Ron Fellows, Max Papis, Scott Pruett, Boris Said, Scott Gaylord and Jacques Villeneuve.

=== Qualifying ===
Scott Pruett of Earnhardt Ganassi Racing won the pole position with a lap time of 102.568 seconds and a speed of 95.082 miles per hour (153.020 km/h). Max Papis started second with a lap speed of 94.835 mph (152.622 km/h), followed by Marcos Ambrose, Patrick Carpentier, Jacques Villeneuve. The remaining top ten comprised Ron Fellows, Boris Said, Steve Wallace, Brad Coleman and Joey Logano. The lone driver to not qualify for the race was Kevin O'Connell.

== Race ==
The race started at 3:30 EST, with pole-sitter Scott Pruett leading until lap 7, in which the caution flag flew for rain, followed by the red flag on the following lap. As a result, most teams added windshield wipers to the cars, while grooved rain tires were installed. Rain tires had been previously used in practice and qualifying for the 1997 NASCAR Thunder 100 exhibition race at Suzuka Circuit, and also in 1999 by the Camping World Truck Series during a practice at Watkins Glen International. At one point, Carl Edwards was seen trying to use what appeared to be a Swiffer mop to try cleaning his windshield, possibly during the first caution.

The race was paused for about an hour before restarting. As a result of the rain, speeds dropped from 90 mph (140 km/h) to 75 mph (121 km/h). On lap 14, Marcos Ambrose took the lead, leading for a race high 27 laps until he was penalized for speeding in pit road. Jacques Villeneuve took the lead on lap 41, which he subsequently relinquished to Ron Fellows on the following lap. Fellows held the lead for seven laps until the race was called due to severe rain on lap 48. On the same lap, Villeneuve, who did not have a wiper installed, collided with another car's rear; Joey Logano also crashed on the lap, hitting a car without brake lights. Patrick Carpentier finished second, followed by Ambrose, Ron Hornaday Jr., and Boris Said. The top ten was rounded out with Edwards, Jason Leffler, Greg Biffle, Clint Bowyer and Steve Wallace.

== Results ==
Pos	Grid	No.	Driver	Team	Manufacturer	Laps	Points
1	6	5	Ron Fellows	JR Motorsports	Chevrolet	48	190
2	4	9	Patrick Carpentier #	Gillett Evernham Motorsports	Dodge	48	170
3	3	59	Marcos Ambrose	JTG Daugherty Racing	Ford	48	175
4	12	33	Ron Hornaday Jr.	Kevin Harvick, Inc.	Chevrolet	48	160
5	7	25	Boris Said	Rensi - No Fear	Ford	48	155
6	18	60	Carl Edwards	Roush Fenway Racing	Ford	48	150
7	14	38	Jason Leffler	Braun Racing	Toyota	48	146
8	16	16	Greg Biffle	Roush Fenway Racing	Ford	48	142
9	29	2	Clint Bowyer	Richard Childress Racing	Chevrolet	48	138
10	8	66	Steve Wallace	Rusty Wallace Racing	Chevrolet	48	134
11	17	29	Scott Wimmer	Richard Childress Racing	Chevrolet	48	130
12	28	88	Brad Keselowski	JR Motorsports	Chevrolet	48	127
13	30	6	David Ragan	Roush Fenway Racing	Ford	48	124
14	19	4	Landon Cassill #	Jay Robinson Racing	Chevrolet	48	121
15	11	7	Mike Wallace	Germain Racing	Toyota	48	118
16	5	32	Jacques Villeneuve	Braun Racing	Toyota	48	120
17	10	20	Joey Logano #	Joe Gibbs Racing	Toyota	47	112
18	32	99	David Reutimann	Michael Waltrip Racing	Toyota	47	109
19	25	1	Mike Bliss	Phoenix Racing	Chevrolet	47	106
20	2	64	Max Papis	Rusty Wallace Racing	Chevrolet	47	103
21	9	27	Brad Coleman	Curb Agajanian Performance Group	Ford	47	105
22	1	40	Scott Pruett	Chip Ganassi Racing	Dodge	47	102
23	23	11	Jason Keller	CJM Racing	Chevrolet	47	94
24	26	47	Kelly Bires	JTG Daugherty Racing	Ford	47	91
25	21	30	Stanton Barrett	SKI Motorsports	Chevrolet	47	88
26	24	98	Alex Garcia	Transnet Racing	Chevrolet	47	85
27	22	81	D. J. Kennington	MacDonald Motorsports	Dodge	47	82
28	15	22	Andrew Ranger	Fitz Motorsports	Dodge	47	79
29	37	52	Scott Gaylord	Jimmy Means Racing	Ford	46	76
30	20	24	Brian Simo	Front Row Motorsports	Chevrolet	44	73
31	27	28	Kenny Wallace	Jay Robinson Racing	Chevrolet	42	70
32	38	0	Wheeler Boys	JD Motorsports	Chevrolet	37	67
33	13	10	Justin Marks	Braun Racing	Toyota	19	64
34	42	01	Trevor Boys	JD Motorsports	Chevrolet	13	61
35	31	05	Burney Lamar	Day Enterprises	Ford	8	58
36	35	31	Jeff Fuller	SKI Motorsports	Chevrolet	7	55
37	43	89	Morgan Shepherd	Faith Motorsports	Chevrolet	7	52
38	34	62	Brandon Whitt	Specialty Racing	Ford	7	49
39	41	61	Stan Barrett	Specialty Racing	Chevrolet	7	46
40	39	90	Don Thomson Jr.	MSRP Motorsports	Chevrolet	2	43
41	36	91	Scott Steckly	MSRP Motorsports	Chevrolet	2	40
42	40	84	Dale Quarterley	Mike Harmon Racing	Chevrolet	2	37
43	33	49	Derrike Cope	Jay Robinson Racing	Chevrolet	1	34
# Rookie of the Year candidate Source:

== Standings after the race ==
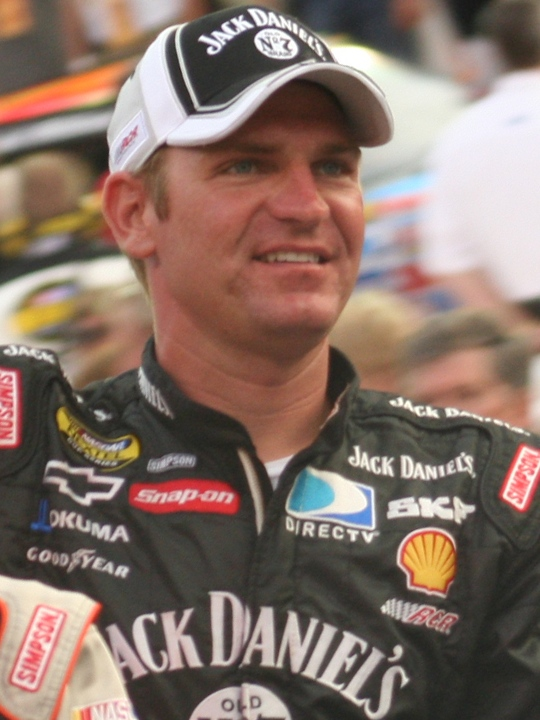
Clint Bowyer led the points standings after the race.

Pos	Driver	Points	Differential
1	Clint Bowyer	3354	0
2	Carl Edwards	3186	-168
3	Brad Keselowski	3170	-184
4	David Reutimann	3035	-319
5	David Ragan	3009	-345
6	Mike Bliss	2944	-410
7	Kyle Busch	2828	-526
8	Mike Wallace	2736	-618
9	Jason Leffler	2637	-717
10	Jason Keller	2628	-726
