= 2008 NASCAR Camping World East Series =

NASCAR season

Seasons
- ← 2007 2009 →

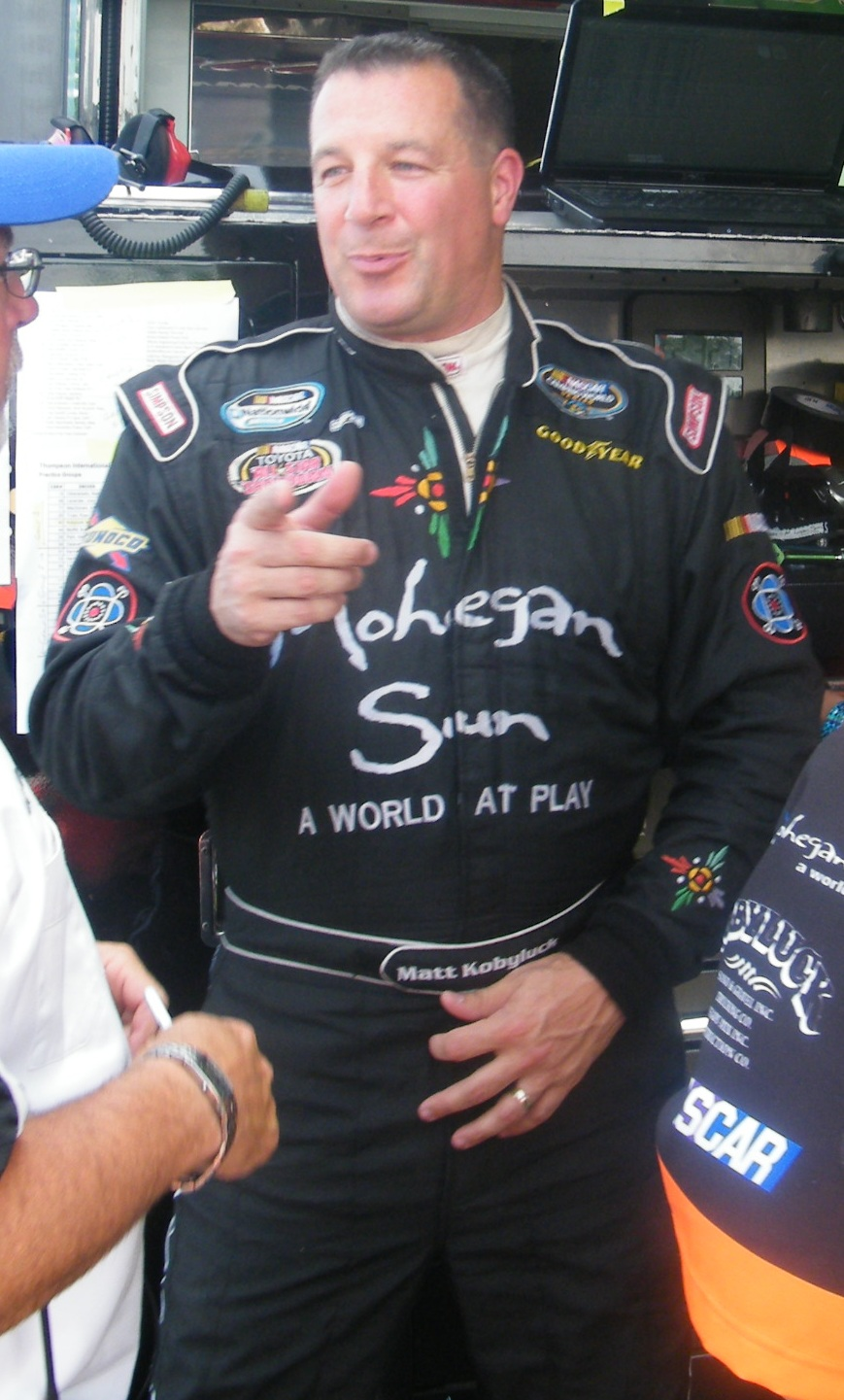
Matt Kobyluck, the 2008 Camping World East Series champion.

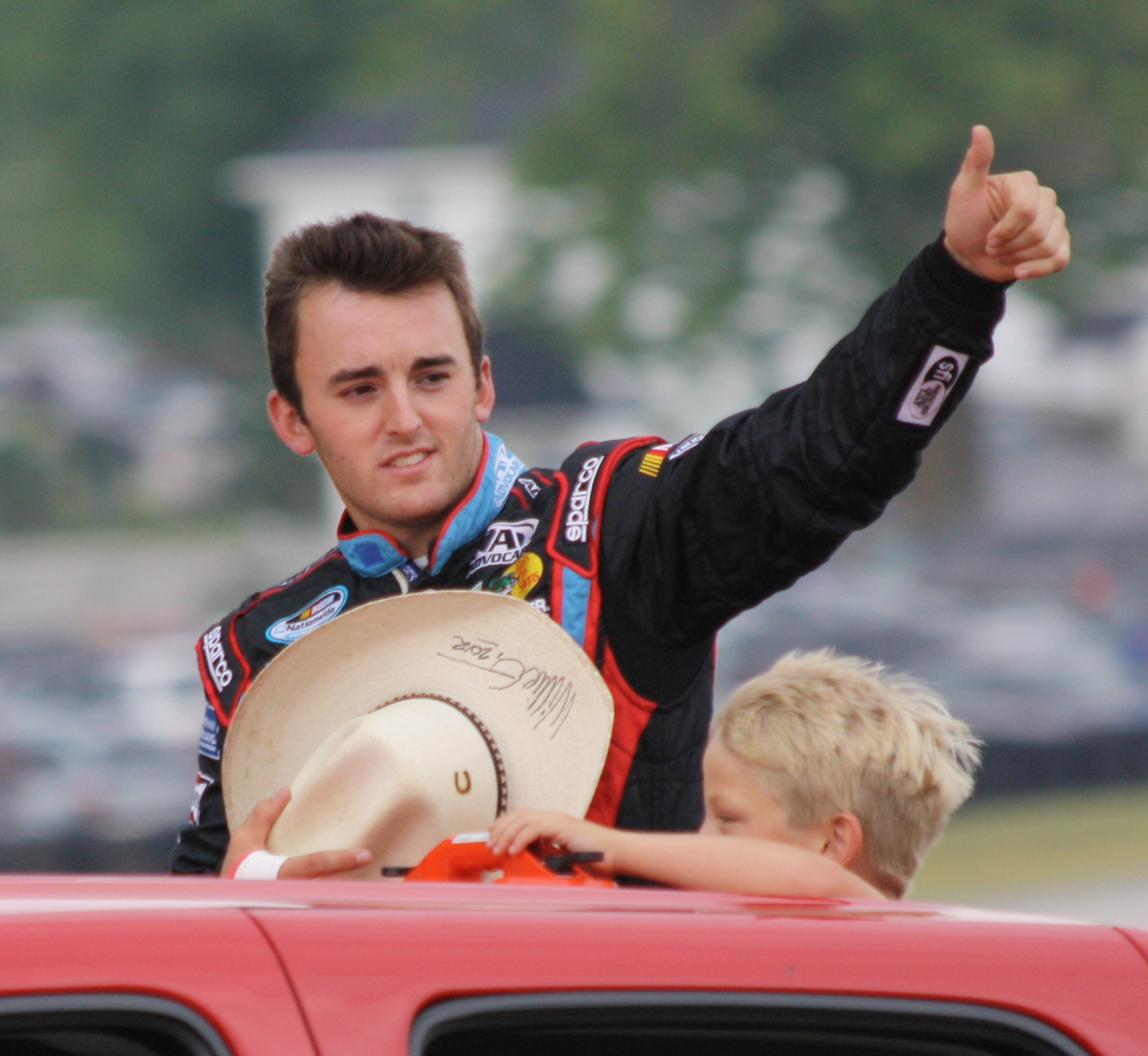
Austin Dillon finished second in the championship behind Kobyluck by 210 points.

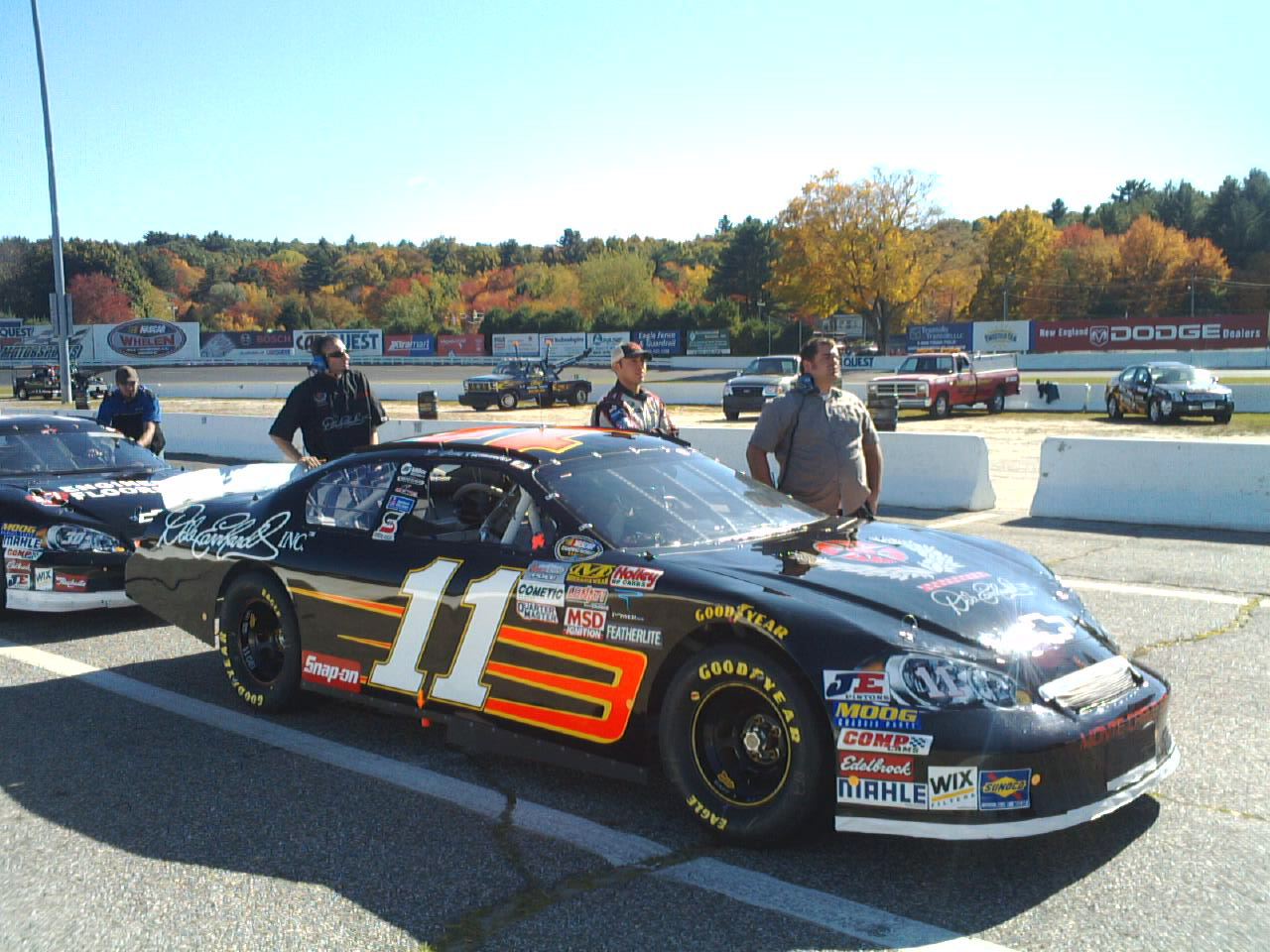
Jesus Hernandez, driving the No. 11 car for Dale Earnhardt, Inc., finished third in the championship. He is the second-to-right person pictured here.

The 2008 NASCAR Camping World East Series was the 22nd season of the Camping World East Series, a regional stock car racing series sanctioned by NASCAR. The season began on April 19, 2008, at Greenville-Pickens Speedway with the An American Revolution 150. The regular season concluded on October 12, 2008, at Stafford Motor Speedway. Matt Kobyluck won the championship, 210 points in front of Austin Dillon. Joey Logano entered the season as the defending drivers' champion, but he did not defend his championship because he moved up to the Nationwide Series in 2008.

It also marked the first season with Camping World as the title sponsor, which replaced Anheuser-Busch's Busch Beer after 21 years.

== Schedule ==
No.	Race title	Track	Date	TV
1	An American Revolution 150 presented by Kevin Whitaker Chevrolet	Greenville-Pickens Speedway, Greenville, South Carolina	April 19	Speed*
2	U.S. Cellular 200 presented by Wellmark	Iowa Speedway, Newton, Iowa	May 18	HDNet
3	Strutmasters.com 150	South Boston Speedway, South Boston, Virginia	May 31	Speed*
4	NASCAR Camping World Series 125 at The Glen	Watkins Glen International, Watkins Glen, New York	June 8	Speed*
5	Heluva Good! Summer 125	New Hampshire Motor Speedway, Loudon, New Hampshire	June 27	Speed*
6	Pepsi Full Fender Frenzy 100	Thompson International Speedway, Thompson, Connecticut	July 12	
7	Strutmasters.com 150 presented by Dollar General	Music City Motorplex, Nashville, Tennessee	July 19	HDNet
8	The Edge Hotel 150	Adirondack International Speedway, New Bremen, New York	July 26	HDNet
9	Mohegan Sun NASCAR Camping World Series 200	Lime Rock Park, Lakeville, Connecticut	August 16	HDNet
10	Mansfield 150	Mansfield Motorsports Park, Mansfield, Ohio	August 23	HDNet
11	Heluva Good! Fall 125	New Hampshire Motor Speedway, Loudon, New Hampshire	September 13	HDNet
12	Sunoco 150	Dover International Speedway, Dover, Delaware	September 19	HDNet
13	36th Annual Carquest Fall Final	Stafford Motor Speedway, Stafford Springs, Connecticut	October 12 (Note: The 36th Annual Carquest Fall Final was scheduled to September 28 however, due to an unfavorable forecast the race was postponed until October 12.)	HDNet
	2008 Toyota All-Star Showdown ^{2}	Toyota Speedway at Irwindale, Irwindale, California	January 24 (2009)	Speed

^{*} Races aired on delay only. All HDNet races aired live and re-aired on Speed.

=== Television ===
The 2008 television schedule followed a similar format to the 2007 season with almost all of the events having television coverage in one form or another. The first part of the season was broadcast on the Speed Channel via tape-delay. HDNet signed on to broadcast the final seven races live. The U.S. Cellular 200 presented by Wellmark race at Iowa Speedway was shown live on HDNet due to the fact that it is a combination race with the Camping World West Series and it is part of the West Series' TV schedule. The Toyota All-Star Showdown moved to January and aired live on Speed.

== 2008 Races ==
=== An American Revolution 150 ===
The An American Revolution 150 presented by Kevin Whitaker Chevrolet was held at Greenville-Pickens Speedway on April 19. Peyton Sellers won the pole for the event and then went on to take the checkered flag in the first position. During post-race inspection, an illegal shock absorber was found on Peyton's car and he was disqualified and was credited with a last-place finish in the race and everyone else in the field moved ahead one finishing position. Austin Dillon crossed the line behind Peyton and was subsequently declared the winner. This was Austin's first win in his first race in the series.

Official Results
Finish	Start	Car #	Driver	Hometown	Car	Laps	Reason Out
1	5	3	Austin Dillon	Lewisville, NC	Chevrolet	156	
2	3	18	Marc Davis	Mitchelville, MD	Toyota	156	
3	7	91	Ben Stancill	Ayden, NC	Chevrolet	156	
4	28	71	Eddie MacDonald	Rowley, MA	Chevrolet	156	
5	11	4	Ricky Carmichael	Clearwater, FL	Chevrolet	156	
6	18	88	Jody Lavender	Hartsville, SC	Ford	156	
7	9	52	Jamie Hayes	Norlina, NC	Chevrolet	156	
8	20	35	Steve Park	East Northport, NY	Chevrolet	156	
9	16	1	Trevor Bayne	Mooresville, NC	Chevrolet	156	
10	8	28	Buster Bennet	Monroe, NC	Ford	156	
11	13	63	John Salemi	Nashua, NH	Chevrolet	156	
12	24	16	Max Dumarey	Gent, Belgium	Chevrolet	156	
13	15	59	Richard Johns	Cornelius, NC	Dodge	156	
14	2	15	Brian Ickler	Poway, CA	Chevrolet	155	
15	22	03	Rogelio López	Aguascalientes, Mexico	Chevrolet	155	
16	14	30	Jeff Anton	Russell, MA	Chevrolet	155	
17	10	11	Jesus Hernandez	Fresno, CA	Chevrolet	155	
18	23	37	Kyle Cattanach	Redding, CA	Chevrolet	155	
19	30	39	Dustin Delaney	Mayfield, NY	Chevrolet	154	
20	27	21	Jonathan Smith	Beacon Falls, CT	Dodge	154	
21	25	38	Alan Tardiff	Lyman, ME	Chevrolet	154	
22	19	40	Matt Kobyluck	Uncasville, CT	Chevrolet	154	
23	12	8	Jeffrey Earnhardt	Mooresville, NC	Chevrolet	153	
24	6	80	Derek Thorn	Lakeport, CA	Ford	153	
25	21	7	Ryan Duff	Hazard, KY	Chevrolet	153	
26	29	26	Scott Bouley	Middlebury, CT	Chevrolet	150	
27	26	2	Craig Goess	Greenville, NC	Toyota	141	Accident
28	4	95	Bobby Hamilton Jr.	Nashville, TN	Dodge	129	Suspension
29	17	99	Bryon Chew	Mattituck, NY	Chevrolet	14	Accident
30	1	44	Peyton Sellers	Danville, VA	Chevrolet	0	Penalty
Fastest Qualifier: Peyton Sellers, Time: 20.702 Seconds, Speed: 86.948 mph (139.929 km/h)
Time of Race: 1hrs., 26 min, 6 seconds.
Margin of Victory: Under Caution
Average race speed: 54.355 mph (87.476 km/h)
Lead changes: 3 among 3 drivers
Cautions: 7 for 43 laps

Did not Qualify: (9) Todd Peck (#50), Jason Cochran (#72), Richard Gould (#58), A. J. Henriksen (#17), Daniel Pope II (#10), Johnny Petrozelle (#33), James Pritchard (#41), Ian Henderson (#93), Joe Oliver (#08).

=== U.S. Cellular 200 ===
The U.S. Cellular 200 presented by Wellmark took place on May 18. This marks the second year that the East and West series have met in Iowa for a points race. Nextel Cup driver Kasey Kahne was on hand to take part in the event and marks the second time in a row that the winner of the previous night's "Nextel All-Star Race" was on hand for this event. Austin Dillon captured his first pole award, and Brian Ickler captured his first win in the series.

Official Results
Finish	Start	Car #	Series	Driver	Hometown	Car	Laps	Reason Out
1	7	15	E	Brian Ickler	Poway, CA	Chevrolet	200	
2	4	9	E	Kasey Kahne	Enumclaw, WA	Dodge	200	
3	8	1	E	Trevor Bayne	Knoxville, TN	Chevrolet	200	
4	40	08	E	Jeffrey Earnhardt	Mooresville, NC	Chevrolet	200	
5	38	11	E	Jesus Hernandez	Fresno, CA	Chevrolet	200	
6	1	3	E	Austin Dillon	Lewisville, NC	Chevrolet	200	
7	6	35	E	Steve Park	East Northport, NY	Chevrolet	200	
8	26	40	E	Matt Kobyluck	Uncasville, CT	Chevrolet	200	
9	10	01	W	Jim Inglebright	Fairfield, CA	Chevrolet	200	
10	11	03	E	Rogelio López	Aguascalientes, Mexico	Chevrolet	200	
11	12	81	E	Mark MacFarland	Winchester, VA	Chevrolet	200	
12	2	46	W	Jeff Barkshire	Auburn, WA	Dodge	200	
13	5	44	E	Peyton Sellers	Danville, VA	Chevrolet	200	
14	21	14	W	Austin Cameron	El Cajon, CA	Toyota	200	
15	30	2	W	Mike David	Modesto, CA	Toyota	200	
16	19	17	W	Jason Patison	Corona, CA	Ford	200	
17	24	16	W	Moses Smith	Tempe, AZ	Toyota	200	
18	15	22	W	Jason Bowles	Ontario, CA	Ford	200	
19	31	99	E	Bryon Chew	Mattituck, NY	Chevrolet	199	
20	18	31	E	James Buescher	Plano, TX	Chevrolet	199	
21	36	4	E	Ricky Carmichael	Clearwater, FL	Chevrolet	199	
22	35	77	W	Andrew Myers	Newport Beach, CA	Ford	199	
23	13	34	W	Mike Gallegos	Wheat Ridge, CO	Chevrolet	199	
24	28	42	W	Jeff Jefferson	Naches, WA	Chevrolet	199	
25	34	91	E	Ben Stancill	Ayden, NC	Chevrolet	199	
26	32	70	W	Greg Pursley	Canyon Country, CA	Chevrolet	199	
27	22	20	W	Eric Holmes	Escalon, CA	Toyota	198	
28	17	8	W	Johnny Borneman III	Ramona, CA	Ford	197	
29	43	65	W	Stan Silva Jr.	Castroville, CA	Chevrolet	197	
30	44	30	E	Jeff Anton	Russell, MA	Chevrolet	195	
31	14	10	W	James Warn	Aurora, OR	Chevrolet	189	
32	41	52	E	Jamie Hayes	Norlina, NC	Chevrolet	188	
33	27	02	E	Craig Goess	Greenville, SC	Toyota	180	
34	42	71	W	Daryl Harr	St.Albert, Canada	Chevrolet	161	
35	39	88	W	Jamie Dick	Albuquerque, NM	Chevrolet	161	
36	37	12	E	Jonathan Smith	Beacon Falls, CT	Dodge	150	Oil Leak
37	20	75	E	Eddie MacDonald	Rowley, MA	Chevrolet	149	
38	33	5	W	Eric Hardin	Anaheim, CA	Chevrolet	130	Accident
39	29	19	W	Terry Henry	Bakersfield, CA	Chevrolet	96	Brakes
40	23	61	W	Brett Thompson	Jerome, ID	Chevrolet	92	Accident
41	9	51	W	Alex Haase	Las Vegas, NV	Toyota	55	Accident
42	3	21	W	David Mayhew	Atascadero, CA	Chevrolet	9	Engine
43	16	41	W	Ryan Foster	Anderson, CA	Ford	2	Accident
44	25	18	E	Marc Davis	Mitchelville, MD	Toyota	0	Penalty
Fastest Qualifier: Austin Dillon, Time: 23.576 Seconds, Speed: 133.610 mph (215.024 km/h)
Time of Race: 2 hrs., 3 mins, 13 secs
Margin of Victory: 1.254 Seconds
Average race speed: 85.216 mph (137.142 km/h)
Lead changes: 13 among 8 drivers
Cautions: 9 for 44 laps

Did not Qualify: (10) Michael Faulk (#36), Max Dumarey (#76), John Salemi (#63), Derek Thorn (#80), Jody Lavender (#89), Dustin Delaney (#39), Ryan Duff (#7), Richard Johns (#59), Lloyd Mack (#33), Ryan Preece (#28)

NOTE: On May 20, NASCAR announced that the No. 18 car of Marc Davis was found to be in violation of Sections 12-4-A (actions detrimental to stock car racing); 12-4-Q (car, car parts, components and/or equipment used do not conform to NASCAR rules); 20C-8.4C (lubrication oil reservoir tank cover was not in place on the top of the lubrication oil reservoir tank encasement) and 20C-2.1O (any device or duct work that permits air to pass from one area of the interior of the car to another, or to the outside of the car, will not be permitted. This includes, but is not limited to, the inside of the car to the trunk area, or the floors, firewalls, crush panels and wheel wells passing air into or out of the car) of the 2008 NASCAR rule book. The violations was discovered during post race inspection on May 18.

=== Strutmasters.com 150 ===
The Strutmasters.com 150 was run on May 31 at South Boston Speedway. Ricky Carmichael took his first pole award and Brian Ickler went on to lead a dominant 149 laps of the Strutmasters.com 150. He then held off bids from runner-up Austin Dillon of Lewisville, North Carolina, and third-place Peyton Sellers of Danville, Virginia, through a late race caution that extended the event to 155 laps. This win was his second of the season, and his second in a row.

Official Results
Finish	Start	Car #	Driver	Hometown	Car	Laps	Reason Out
1	2	15	Brian Ickler	Poway, CA	Chevrolet	155	
2	9	3	Austin Dillon	Lewisville, NC	Chevrolet	155	
3	11	44	Peyton Sellers	Danville, VA	Chevrolet	155	
4	16	71	Eddie MacDonald	Rowley, MA	Chevrolet	155	
5	12	40	Matt Kobyluck	Uncasville, CT	Chevrolet	155	
6	23	88	Jody Lavender	Hartsville, SC	Ford	155	
7	20	8	Jeffrey Earnhardt	Mooresville, NC	Chevrolet	155	
8	17	35	Steve Park	East Northport, NY	Chevrolet	155	
9	5	18	Marc Davis	Mitchelville, MD	Toyota	155	
10	14	03	Rogelio López	Aguascalientes, Mexico	Chevrolet	155	
11	3	99	Bryon Chew	Mattituck, NY	Chevrolet	155	
12	27	30	Jeff Anton	Russell, MA	Chevrolet	155	
13	10	2	Craig Goess	Greenville, NC	Toyota	155	
14	26	7	Ryan Duff	Hazard, KY	Chevrolet	155	
15	7	11	Jesus Hernandez	Fresno, CA	Chevrolet	155	
16	13	52	Jamie Hayes	Norlina, NC	Chevrolet	155	
17	31	27	Chase Mattioli	Long Pond, PA	Ford	154	
18	24	21	Jonathan Smith	Beacon Falls, CT	Dodge	154	
19	28	39	Dustin Delaney	Mayfield, NY	Chevrolet	153	
20	8	80	Derek Thorn	Lakeport, CA	Ford	151	
21	4	63	John Salemi	Nashua, NH	Chevrolet	151	
22	22	72	Jason Cochran	Marion, NC	Chevrolet	149	
23	21	59	Richard Johns	Cornelius, NC	Dodge	146	
24	18	58	Richard Gould	North Brunswick, NJ	Chevrolet	142	
25	6	1	Trevor Bayne	Knoxville, TN	Chevrolet	141	
26	1	4	Ricky Carmichael	Clearwater, FL	Chevrolet	139	
27	15	91	Ben Stancill	Ayden, NC	Chevrolet	127	Accident
28	25	16	Max Dumarey	Gent, Belgium	Chevrolet	127	Radiator
29	29	41	James Pritchard Jr.	Wharton, NJ	Dodge	122	Engine
30	30	84	Todd Peck	Glenville, PA	Chevrolet	67	Accident
31	32	93	Ian Henderson	Greenville, SC	Chevrolet	64	Engine
32	19	37	Alex Kennedy	Aztek, NM	Chevrolet	17	Accident
Fastest Qualifier: Ricky Carmichael, Time: 16.043 Seconds, Speed: 89.759 mph (144.453 km/h)
Time of Race: 1 hrs., 40 mins, 46 secs
Margin of Victory: Under Caution
Average race speed: 36.917 mph (59.412 km/h)
Lead changes: 12 among 3 drivers
Cautions: 15 for 77 laps

Did not Qualify: (1) Johnny Petrozelle (#33).

NOTE: This was Eddie MacDonald's 100th career start.

=== NASCAR Camping World Series 125 At The Glen ===
The NASCAR Camping World Series 125 at The Glen was run on June 8. This marked the return of the series to the historic Watkins Glen International track for the first time since 2004. Antonio Pérez took the pole award and Matt Kobyluck went on to win the race. A green-white-checkered finish necessitated by a late-race blown engine and stretched the race from its scheduled 51 laps to 55. Marc Davis (No. 18 Slim Jim Toyota) led a total of 32 laps of the event and led the field to its final restart.

Official Results
Finish	Start	Car #	Driver	Hometown	Car	Laps	Reason Out
1	2	40	Matt Kobyluck	Uncasville, CT	Chevrolet	55	
2	7	8	Jeffrey Earnhardt	Mooresville, NC	Chevrolet	55	
3	11	1	Trevor Bayne	Knoxville, TN	Chevrolet	55	
4	14	11	Jesus Hernandez	Fresno, CA	Chevrolet	55	
5	4	35	Steve Park	East Northport, NY	Dodge	55	
6	15	99	Bryon Chew	Mattituck, NY	Chevrolet	55	
7	17	81	Jason Holehouse	Ossining N.Y.	Toyota	55	
8	23	75	Tim Cowen	Ashland, Ohio	Ford	55	
9	9	4	Ricky Carmichael	Clearwater, FL	Dodge	55	
10	1	12	Antonio Pérez	Mexico City, Mexico	Dodge	55	
11	28	03	Rogelio López	Aguascalientes, Mexico	Chevrolet	55	
12	20	3	Austin Dillon	Lewisville, NC	Chevrolet	55	
13	8	18	Marc Davis	Mitchelville, MD	Toyota	54	
14	25	2	Craig Goess	Greenville, NC	Toyota	54	
15	22	88	Jody Lavender	Hartsville, SC	Ford	54	
16	26	39	Dustin Delaney	Mayfield, NY	Chevrolet	54	
17	24	7	Ryan Duff	Hazard, KY	Chevrolet	52	
18	12	44	Peyton Sellers	Danville, VA	Chevrolet	52	
19	10	65	Stan Silva	Castroville Calif.	Chevrolet	52	
20	27	25	Jeremy Clark	Concord, N.C.	Chevrolet	50	
21	3	16	Max Dumarey	Gent, Belgium	Dodge	48	Engine
22	18	23	Tim George Jr.	Nevado, Calif.	Chevrolet	41	Radiator
23	19	52	Jamie Hayes	Norlina, NC	Chevrolet	33	Accident
24	6	15	Brian Ickler	Poway, CA	Chevrolet	30	Clutch
25	16	30	Jeff Anton	Russell, MA	Chevrolet	27	Accident
26	5	37	Nick DeBruijn	Vlaardingen, Netherlands	Chevrolet	25	Accident
27	13	71	Eddie MacDonald	Rowley, MA	Ford	6	Engine
28	21	21	Jonathan Smith	Beacon Falls, CT	Dodge	5	Engine
Fastest Qualifier: Antonio Pérez, Time: 74.223 Seconds, Speed: 118.831 mph (191.240 km/h)
Time of Race: 1 hrs., 55 mins, 10 secs
Margin of Victory: Under Caution
Average race speed: 70.203 mph (112.981 km/h)
Lead changes: 4 among 3 drivers
Cautions: 4 for 17 laps

Did not Qualify: (2) James Buescher (#31), Larry Moloney (#89)

NOTE: The race was red flagged just past half-way due to rain. The red flag lasted for approximately 90 minutes

=== Heluva Good! Summer 125 ===
The Heluva Good! Summer 125 was run on June 27 at the New Hampshire Motor Speedway. This race is the first of three this season that will be run in conjunction with the NASCAR Nextel Cup series. Qualifying was rained out and the field was set by the rulebook. This put points leader Austin Dillon on the pole. Matt Kobyluck went on to lead a race high 47 laps, but it was Eddie MacDonald taking the win after he managed to jump into the lead over Trevor Bayne on the final restart on lap 122.

Official Results
Finish	Start	Car #	Driver	Hometown	Car	Laps	Reason Out
1	10	71	Eddie MacDonald	Rowley, MA	Chevrolet	127	
2	6	1	Trevor Bayne	Knoxville, TN	Chevrolet	127	
3	4	40	Matt Kobyluck	Uncasville, CT	Chevrolet	127	
4	1	3	Austin Dillon	Lewisville, NC	Chevrolet	127	
5	12	4	Ricky Carmichael	Clearwater, FL	Dodge	127	
6	7	18	Marc Davis	Mitchelville, MD	Toyota	127	
7	21	61	Mike Olsen	N. Haverhill, N.H.	Chevrolet	127	
8	24	63	John Salemi	Nashua, N.H.	Chevrolet	127	
9	22	55	Brad Leighton	Center Harbor, N.H.	Chevrolet	127	
10	2	15	Brian Ickler	Poway, CA	Chevrolet	127	
11	18	39	Dustin Delaney	Mayfield, NY	Chevrolet	127	
12	8	11	Jesus Hernandez	Fresno, CA	Chevrolet	127	
13	11	88	Jody Lavender	Hartsville, SC	Chevrolet	127	
14	33	96	Mike Johnson	Salisbury, Mass.	Ford	127	
15	16	30	Jeff Anton	Russell, MA	Chevrolet	127	
16	19	16	Max Dumarey	Gent, Belgium	Chevrolet	127	
17	23	21	Jonathan Smith	Beacon Falls, CT	Dodge	127	
18	31	01	Charles Lewandoski	Stafford Springs, Conn.	Toyota	127	
19	15	52	Jamie Hayes	Norlina, N.C.	Chevrolet	127	
20	32	14	Joe Masessa	Franklin Lakes, N.J.	Chevrolet	127	
21	28	38	Alan Tardiff	Lyman, Maine	Chevrolet	127	
22	17	2	Craig Goess	Greenville, NC	Toyota	127	
23	13	99	Bryon Chew	Mattituck, NY	Chevrolet	127	
24	26	80	Derek Thorn	Lakeport, Calif.	Ford	126	
25	36	27	Chase Mattioli	Long Pond, Penn.	Ford	125	
26	35	12	Antonio Pérez	Mexico City, Mexico	Dodge	120	Accident
27	29	26	Scott Bouley	Thomaston, Conn.	Chevrolet	120	
28	3	35	Steve Park	East Northport, NY	Chevrolet	118	
29	14	44	Peyton Sellers	Danville, VA	Chevrolet	118	
30	20	7	Ryan Duff	Hazard, KY	Chevrolet	108	Accident
31	34	24	Patrick Dupree	Saranac Lake, N.Y.	Dodge	108	Accident
32	9	03	Rogelio López	Aguascalientes, Mexico	Chevrolet	102	
33	30	50	Todd Peck	Glenville, Penn.	Chevrolet	81	Accident
34	5	8	Jeffrey Earnhardt	Mooresville, NC	Chevrolet	32	Accident
35	25	59	Bobby Hamilton Jr.	Nashville, Tenn.	Dodge	23	Accident
36	27	41	James Pritchard Jr.	Wharton, N.J.	Dodge	0	Engine
Fastest Qualifier: Field set as per rulebook, rain
Time of Race: 1 hrs., 39 mins, 31 secs
Margin of Victory: .515 secs
Average race speed: 81.011 mph (130.375 km/h)
Lead changes: 9 among 6 drivers
Cautions: 7 for 55 laps

Did not qualify: None

NOTE: This was Eddie MacDonald's first win at New Hampshire Motor Speedway in 16 career NASCAR Camping World Series East starts at the track.

=== Pepsi Full Fender Frenzy 100 ===
The Pepsi Full Fender Frenzy 100 was run on July 12 at the Thompson International Speedway. Jesus Hernandez seemed to have the car to beat as he led three times for a race high of 50 laps, but it was Trevor Bayne who took both the pole and the win for the event. This was Bayne's first pole award and his first win in the series in only his sixth start.

Official Results
Finish	Start	Car #	Driver	Hometown	Car	Laps	Reason Out
1	1	1	Trevor Bayne	Knoxville, TN	Chevrolet	100	
2	8	11	Jesus Hernandez	Fresno, CA	Chevrolet	100	
3	9	55	Brad Leighton	Center Harbor, NH	Chevrolet	100	
4	2	18	Marc Davis	Mitchelville, MD	Toyota	100	
5	12	8	Jeffrey Earnhardt	Mooresville, NC	Chevrolet	100	
6	10	88	Jody Lavender	Hartsville, SC	Ford	100	
7	4	40	Matt Kobyluck	Uncasville, CT	Chevrolet	100	
8	23	03	Rogelio López	Aguascalientes, Mexico	Chevrolet	100	
9	11	3	Austin Dillon	Lewisville, NC	Chevrolet	100	
10	21	30	Jeff Anton	Russell, MA	Chevrolet	100	
11	14	16	Max Dumarey	Gent, Belgium	Chevrolet	100	
12	25	39	Dustin Delaney	Mayfield, NY	Chevrolet	100	
13	24	21	Jonathan Smith	Beacon Falls, CT	Dodge	100	
14	26	52	Jamie Hayes	Norlina, N.C.	Chevrolet	100	
15	3	71	Eddie MacDonald	Rowley, MA	Chevrolet	100	
16	16	5	Joey Polewarczyk	Hudson, N.H.	Chevrolet	100	
17	17	4	Ricky Carmichael	Clearwater, FL	Dodge	100	Suspension
18	5	44	Peyton Sellers	Danville, VA	Chevrolet	100	
19	7	15	Brian Ickler	Poway, CA	Chevrolet	100	
20	19	37	Alex Kennedy	Aztek, NM	Chevrolet	100	
21	22	7	Ryan Duff	Hazard, KY	Chevrolet	100	
22	6	35	Steve Park	East Northport, NY	Chevrolet	100	
23	20	22	Eric Lux	Buffalo, N.Y.	Toyota	100	
24	15	2	Craig Goess	Greenville, NC	Toyota	99	
25	13	99	Bryon Chew	Mattituck, NY	Chevrolet	83	Accident
26	27	41	James Pritchard Jr.	Wharton, N.J.	Dodge	73	Suspension
27	28	08	Joe Oliver	Commack, N.Y.	Chevrolet	71	
28	18	96	Mike Johnson	Salisbury, Mass.	Ford	43	Radiator
Fastest Qualifier: Trevor Bayne, Time: 20.357 Seconds, Speed: 110.527 mph (177.876 km/h)
Time of Race: 54 mins, 13 secs
Margin of Victory: .460 secs
Average race speed: 69.167 mph (111.313 km/h)
Lead changes: 8 among 5 drivers
Cautions: 6 for 35 laps

Did not qualify: (1) Guy Pavageau (#05)

=== Strutmasters.com 150 presented by Dollar General ===
The Strutmasters.com 150 presented by Dollar General was run on July 19 at the Music City Motorplex. Sterling Marlin was on hand to compete in this event. Peyton Sellers captured another pole award and led a race-high 74 laps. In the end it was Matt Kobyluck who crossed the start–finish line first to capture his second win of the season.

Official Results
Finish	Start	Car #	Driver	Hometown	Car	Laps	Reason Out
1	6	40	Matt Kobyluck	Uncasville, CT	Chevrolet	150	
2	1	44	Peyton Sellers	Danville, VA	Chevrolet	150	
3	3	3	Austin Dillon	Lewisville, NC	Chevrolet	150	
4	20	4	Ricky Carmichael	Clearwater, FL	Dodge	150	
5	7	80	Derek Thorn	Lakeport, Calif.	Ford	150	
6	16	35	Steve Park	East Northport, NY	Chevrolet	150	
7	9	11	Jesus Hernandez	Fresno, CA	Chevrolet	150	
8	5	15	Brian Ickler	Poway, CA	Chevrolet	150	
9	10	2	Craig Goess	Greenville, NC	Toyota	150	
10	22	16	Max Dumarey	Gent, Belgium	Chevrolet	150	
11	26	39	Dustin Delaney	Mayfield, NY	Chevrolet	150	
12	4	1	Trevor Bayne	Knoxville, TN	Chevrolet	150	
13	17	52	Jamie Hayes	Norlina, N.C.	Chevrolet	149	
14	27	27	Chase Mattioli	Long Pond, Penn.	Ford	149	
15	21	30	Jeff Anton	Russell, MA	Chevrolet	147	
16	15	88	Jody Lavender	Hartsville, SC	Ford	147	
17	13	18	Marc Davis	Mitchelville, MD	Toyota	147	
18	25	17	A. J. Henriksen	Chicago, Ill.	Chevrolet	147	
19	2	8	Jeffrey Earnhardt	Mooresville, NC	Chevrolet	145	
20	11	59	Richard Johns	Cornelius, N.C.	Dodge	131	
21	8	03	Rogelio López	Aguascalientes, Mexico	Chevrolet	99	
22	14	95	Sterling Marlin	Columbia, Tenn.	Dodge	93	Tire
23	19	7	Ryan Duff	Hazard, KY	Chevrolet	88	Suspension
24	12	71	Eddie MacDonald	Rowley, MA	Chevrolet	85	Ignition
25	23	21	Jonathan Smith	Beacon Falls, CT	Dodge	29	Radiator
26	24	50	Todd Peck	Glenville, Penn.	Chevrolet	21	Accident
27	18	10	Daniel Pope II	Smryna, Tenn.	Dodge	20	Accident
28	28	58	Richard Gould	North Brunswick, N.J.	Chevrolet	17	Accident
Fastest Qualifier: Peyton Sellers, Time: 19.508 Seconds, Speed: 109.986 mph (177.005 km/h)
Time of Race: 1 hrs., 12 mins, 52 secs (record)
Margin of Victory: 1.127 Seconds
Average race speed: 73.614 mph (118.470 km/h)
Lead changes: 12 among 4 drivers
Cautions: 8 for 26 laps

Did not Qualify: None

=== The Edge Hotel 150 ===
"The Edge Hotel 150" was run on July 26 at Adirondack Motor Speedway in Lowville (New Bremen), New York. Bryon Chew captured his first pole award of the season and went on to finish eleventh, while Matt Kobyluck, who led for only three laps, went on to take the win for his third of the season and second in a row. This was also Kobyluck's third win at this track in only six visits.

Official Results
Finish	Start	Car #	Driver	Hometown	Car	Laps	Reason Out
1	7	40	Matt Kobyluck	Uncasville, CT	Chevrolet	150	
2	3	1	Trevor Bayne	Knoxville, TN	Chevrolet	150	
3	9	71	Eddie MacDonald	Rowley, MA	Chevrolet	150	
4	5	8	Jeffrey Earnhardt	Mooresville, NC	Chevrolet	150	
5	17	88	Jody Lavender	Hartsville, SC	Ford	150	
6	20	4	Ricky Carmichael	Clearwater, FL	Dodge	150	
7	21	11	Jesus Hernandez	Fresno, CA	Chevrolet	150	
8	8	63	John Salemi	Nashua, N.H.	Chevrolet	150	
9	4	44	Peyton Sellers	Danville, VA	Chevrolet	150	
10	10	18	Marc Davis	Mitchelville, MD	Toyota	150	
11	1	99	Bryon Chew	Mattituck, NY	Chevrolet	150	
12	12	16	Max Dumarey	Gent, Belgium	Chevrolet	150	
13	15	2	Craig Goess	Greenville, NC	Toyota	150	
14	19	35	Steve Park	East Northport, NY	Chevrolet	150	
15	11	7	Ryan Duff	Hazard, KY	Chevrolet	150	
16	18	39	Dustin Delaney	Mayfield, NY	Chevrolet	150	
17	25	65	Levi Arthur	Lyons Falls, N.Y.	Chevrolet	150	
18	24	26	Scott Bouley	Thomaston, Conn.	Chevrolet	150	
19	13	03	Rogelio López	Aguascalientes, Mexico	Chevrolet	150	
20	14	30	Jeff Anton	Russell, MA	Chevrolet	150	
21	16	52	Jamie Hayes	Norlina, NC	Chevrolet	149	
22	23	21	Jonathan Smith	Beacon Falls, CT	Dodge	148	
23	22	41	James Pritchard Jr.	Wharton, N.J.	Dodge	148	
24	6	15	Brian Ickler	Poway, CA	Chevrolet	120	Accident
25	2	3	Austin Dillon	Lewisville, NC	Chevrolet	0	Penalty
Fastest Qualifier: Bryon Chew, 109.296 mph (175.895 km/h), 16.469 seconds
Time of Race: 2 hrs., 9 mins, 46 secs
Margin of Victory: Under Caution
Average race speed: 34.678 mph (55.809 km/h)
Lead changes: 8 among 5 drivers
Cautions: 12 for 55 laps

Did not Qualify: None

NOTE: NASCAR announced on July 29 that the #3 car of Austin Dillon was being penalized due to a rules violations discovered during post-race inspection. The car was found to be in violation of Sections 12-4-A (actions detrimental to stock car racing); 12-4-Q (car, car parts, components and/or equipment used do not conform to NASCAR rules); and 20C-12.3-S (front shock absorbers would not extend to the specified distance within the specified period of time) of the 2008 NASCAR rule book. The violations were discovered during post race inspection on July 26. The infraction dropped Dillon to 25th in the official race finish. All other drivers in the event moved up one position in the official finishing order.

=== Mohegan Sun NASCAR Camping World Series 200 ===
The Mohegan Sun NASCAR Camping World Series 200 took place on August 16 at Lime Rock Park in Lakeville, Connecticut. This race is the second and final road course on the 2008 schedule. Qualifying for this event was rained out so the starting lineup was set by the rule book. This put points leader Matt Kobyluck on the pole for the event. Matt went on to lead a race high 41 laps en route to win his 4th race of the season and third in a row.

Official Results
Finish	Start	Car #	Driver	Hometown	Car	Laps	Reason Out
1	1	40	Matt Kobyluck	Uncasville, CT	Chevrolet	82	
2	5	18	Marc Davis	Mitchelville, MD	Toyota	82	
3	12	44	Peyton Sellers	Danville, VA	Chevrolet	82	
4	4	11	Jesus Hernandez	Fresno, CA	Chevrolet	82	
5	21	61	Mike Olsen	N. Haverhill, N.H.	Chevrolet	82	
6	26	31	Eric Curran	East Hampton, Mass.	Chevrolet	82	
7	11	35	Steve Park	East Northport, NY	Chevrolet	82	
8	16	16	Max Dumarey	Gent, Belgium	Chevrolet	82	
9	14	30	Jeff Anton	Russell, MA	Chevrolet	82	
10	23	37	Alex Kennedy	Aztek, NM	Chevrolet	82	
11	13	52	Jamie Hayes	Norlina, N.C.	Chevrolet	82	
12	6	4	Ricky Carmichael	Clearwater, FL	Dodge	82	
13	27	96	Mike Johnson	Salisbury, Mass.	Ford	82	
14	8	71	Eddie MacDonald	Rowley, MA	Chevrolet	82	
15	20	7	Ryan Duff	Hazard, KY	Chevrolet	82	
16	29	75	Tim Cowen	Ashland, Ohio	Ford	82	
17	2	1	Trevor Bayne	Knoxville, TN	Chevrolet	82	
18	9	8	Jeffrey Earnhardt	Mooresville, NC	Chevrolet	82	
19	7	15	Brian Ickler	Poway, CA	Chevrolet	82	
20	30	89	Larry Maloney	Wayland, Mass.	Ford	82	
21	3	3	Austin Dillon	Lewisville, NC	Chevrolet	82	
22	15	39	Dustin Delaney	Mayfield, NY	Chevrolet	82	
23	10	88	Jody Lavender	Hartsville, SC	Ford	82	
24	25	26	Scott Bouley	Thomaston, Conn.	Chevrolet	81	
25	31	32	Dale Quarterley	Westfield, Mass.	Chevrolet	78	Electrical
26	19	99	Bryon Chew	Mattituck, NY	Chevrolet	71	Suspension
27	28	81	Jason Holehouse	Ossining N.Y.	Toyota	38	Accident
28	32	17	Alessandro Ciompi	Follonica, Italy	Chevrolet	33	Accident
29	24	27	Chase Mattioli	Long Pond, Penn.	Ford	23	Accident
30	17	2	Justin Lofton	Westmoreland, Calif.	Toyota	9	Engine
31	22	63	John Salemi	Nashua, N.H.	Chevrolet	9	Clutch
32	18	21	Jonathan Smith	Beacon Falls, CT	Dodge	1	Transmission
Fastest Qualifier: Field set by rule book due to rain.
Time of Race: 1 hrs., 15 mins, 48 secs
Margin of Victory: 1.636 Seconds
Average race speed: 99.309 mph (159.822 km/h)
Lead changes: 8 among 7 drivers
Cautions: 7 for 36 laps

Did not Qualify: None

Note: The race was red flagged at lap 51 due to rain. The red flag was out for 75 minutes before racing resumed.

=== Mansfield 150 ===
The Mansfield 150 took place on August 23 at Mansfield Motorsports Park in Mansfield, Ohio. Trevor Bayne captured his second pole award of the season, while Brian Ickler dominated the field leading six times for 128 laps en route to his third win of the season.

Official Results
Finish	Start	Car #	Driver	Hometown	Car	Laps	Reason Out
1	3	15	Brian Ickler	Poway, CA	Chevrolet	152	
2	4	40	Matt Kobyluck	Uncasville, CT	Chevrolet	152	
3	11	44	Peyton Sellers	Danville, VA	Chevrolet	152	
4	8	11	Jesus Hernandez	Fresno, CA	Chevrolet	152	
5	10	2	Craig Goess	Greenville, NC	Toyota	152	
6	12	3	Austin Dillon	Lewisville, NC	Chevrolet	152	
7	6	80	Derek Thorn	Lakeport, Calif.	Ford	152	
8	13	4	Ricky Carmichael	Clearwater, FL	Dodge	152	
9	17	37	Kyle Cattanach	Redding, Calif.	Chevrolet	152	
10	2	8	Jeffrey Earnhardt	Mooresville, NC	Chevrolet	152	
11	21	22	Eric Lux	Buffalo, N.Y.	Toyota	152	
12	9	88	Jody Lavender	Hartsville, SC	Ford	152	
13	7	9	Kevin Swindell	Germantown, Tenn.	Dodge	152	
14	19	30	Jeff Anton	Russell, MA	Chevrolet	152	
15	23	72	Jason Cochran	Marion, N.C.	Chevrolet	152	
16	24	39	Dustin Delaney	Mayfield, NY	Chevrolet	152	
17	22	75	Tim Cowen	Ashland, Ohio	Ford	152	
18	5	35	Steve Park	East Northport, NY	Chevrolet	152	
19	16	18	Marc Davis	Mitchelville, MD	Toyota	152	
20	1	1	Trevor Bayne	Knoxville, TN	Chevrolet	152	
21	18	71	Eddie MacDonald	Rowley, MA	Ford	151	
22	25	21	Jonathan Smith	Beacon Falls, CT	Dodge	151	
23	20	16	Max Dumarey	Gent, Belgium	Chevrolet	149	
24	15	7	Ryan Duff	Hazard, KY	Chevrolet	126	Accident
25	14	52	Jamie Hayes	Norlina, N.C.	Chevrolet	103	Fuel Pump
26	26	05	Guy Pavageau	Columbia, Md.	Chevrolet	0	Engine
Fastest Qualifier: Trevor Bayne, Time: 16.439 Seconds, Speed: 109.496 mph (176.217 km/h)
Time of Race: 1 hrs., 12 mins, 0 secs
Margin of Victory: .370 Seconds
Average race speed: 63.333 mph (101.925 km/h)
Lead changes: 10 among 3 drivers
Cautions: 12 for 55 laps

Did not Qualify: None

=== Heluva Good! Fall 125 ===
The Heluva Good! Fall 125 took place on September 13 at New Hampshire Motor Speedway in Loudon. "Independent" teams lead the field by taking the top three spots in qualifying on Thursday. Peyton Sellers, Steve Park and Eddie MacDonald took the top three spots respectively; Each of them drive for teams that have no affiliation with any Cup or Nationwide teams. Rain on Friday forced the race to be postponed until Saturday morning. A 52 lap green flag stretch during the middle of the race was not planned on and ended up resulting in several teams running out of gas in the closing laps. Eddie MacDonald took the lead from Steve Park on the last lap and went on to win the race.

Official Results
Finish	Start	Car #	Driver	Hometown	Car	Laps	Reason Out
1	3	71	Eddie MacDonald	Rowley, MA	Chevrolet	125	
2	2	35	Steve Park	East Northport, NY	Chevrolet	125	
3	13	40	Matt Kobyluck	Uncasville, CT	Chevrolet	125	
4	17	9	Matt Hirschman	Northampton, Penn.	Dodge	125	
5	15	3	Austin Dillon	Lewisville, NC	Chevrolet	125	
6	10	03	Joey Polewarczyk	Hudson, N.H.	Chevrolet	125	
7	26	61	Mike Olsen	N. Haverhill, N.H.	Chevrolet	125	
8	8	1	Trevor Bayne	Knoxville, TN	Chevrolet	125	
9	22	99	Bryon Chew	Mattituck, NY	Chevrolet	125	
10	23	30	Jeff Anton	Russell, MA	Chevrolet	125	
11	20	39	Dustin Delaney	Mayfield, NY	Chevrolet	125	
12	29	16	Max Dumarey	Gent, Belgium	Chevrolet	124	
13	12	2	Craig Goess	Greenville, NC	Toyota	124	
14	9	8	Jeffrey Earnhardt	Mooresville, NC	Chevrolet	124	
15	7	80	Derek Thorn	Lakeport, Calif.	Ford	124	
16	16	4	Ricky Carmichael	Clearwater, FL	Dodge	123	
17	28	38	Alan Tardiff	Lyman, Maine	Chevrolet	123	
18	5	18	Marc Davis	Mitchelville, MD	Toyota	123	
19	11	11	Jesus Hernandez	Fresno, CA	Chevrolet	123	
20	1	44	Peyton Sellers	Danville, VA	Chevrolet	123	
21	36	41	James Pritchard Jr.	Wharton, N.J.	Dodge	123	
22	6	55	Brad Leighton	Center Harbor, N.H.	Chevrolet	122	
23	27	7	Ryan Duff	Hazard, KY	Chevrolet	122	
24	19	52	Jamie Hayes	Norlina, N.C.	Chevrolet	122	
25	33	26	Scott Bouley	Thomaston, Conn.	Chevrolet	122	
26	14	88	Jody Lavender	Hartsville, SC	Chevrolet	121	
27	32	50	Todd Peck	Glenville, Penn.	Chevrolet	114	
28	25	12	Antonio Pérez	Mexico City, Mexico	Dodge	93	Engine
29	4	15	Brian Ickler	Poway, CA	Chevrolet	91	Accident
30	38	45	Ryan Black	Alto Loma, Calif.	Ford	72	Brakes
31	37	81	Jeremy Clark	Concord, N.C.	Toyota	65	Rear End
32	35	21	Jonathan Smith	Beacon Falls, CT	Resorts	46	Engine
33	18	63	John Salemi	Nashua, N.H.	Chevrolet	45	Vibration
34	24	37	Alex Kennedy	Aztek, NM	Chevrolet	34	Accident
35	21	96	Mike Johnson	Salisbury, Mass.	Ford	31	Accident
36	30	14	Joe Masessa	Franklin Lakes, N.J.	Chevrolet	22	Accident
37	34	72	Jason Cochran	Marion, N.C.	Chevrolet	22	Accident
38	31	13	Laine Chase	Beverly, Mass.	Chevrolet	13	Engine
Fastest Qualifier: Peyton Sellers, 126.437 mph (203.481 km/h), 30.124 seconds
1 hour 25 minutes 14 seconds
Margin of Victory: 0.365 seconds
Average Speed: 93.097 mph (149.825 km/h)
Lead changes: Eddie MacDonald 60, Brad Leighton 44, Trevor Bayne 9, Peyton Sellers 6, Steve Park 3, Marc Davis 3. 9 changes among 6 drivers
Cautions: 6 for 21 laps
Lap Leaders: E.MacDonald 1-12; P.Sellers 13; E.MacDonald 14-19; P.Sellers 20-24; M.Davis 25-27; T.Bayne 28-36; E.MacDonald 37-76; B.Leighton 77-120; S.Park 121-123; E.MacDonald 124-125

Did not Qualify: None

Note: Eddie MacDonald became the third driver to complete the sweep of the Camping World Series East events at NHMS. Previous drivers to accomplish this feat are Mike McLaughlin in 1992 and Joey Logano in 2007

=== Sunoco 150 ===
The Sunoco 150 was run on September 19 at Dover International Speedway in Dover, Delaware. Points leader Matt Kobyluck was poised to clinch the series championship with good finish in the race. Brian Ickler got his first pole position of the year but the race would turn bittersweet for him as he was involved in a wreck only 18 laps into the event. A nine-minute red flag stopped the race for cleanup after an accident. Aric Almirola would go on to win the race but it was Matt Kobyluck, who by finishing in third place and extending his lead to 219 points over second place with only one race remaining, clinched the series championship.

Official Results
Finish	Start	Car #	Driver	Hometown	Car	Laps	Reason Out
1	8	8	Aric Almirola	Tampa, Fla.	Chevrolet	150	
2	6	18	Marc Davis	Mitchelville, MD	Toyota	150	
3	5	40	Matt Kobyluck	Uncasville, CT	Chevrolet	150	
4	9	35	Steve Park	East Northport, NY	Chevrolet	150	
5	20	59	Bobby Hamilton Jr.	Nashville, Tenn.	Dodge	150	
6	14	9	Matt Hirschman	Northampton, Penn.	Dodge	150	
7	16	4	Ricky Carmichael	Clearwater, FL	Dodge	150	
8	27	88	Jody Lavender	Hartsville, SC	Chevrolet	150	
9	17	3	Austin Dillon	Lewisville, NC	Chevrolet	150	
10	11	99	Bryon Chew	Mattituck, NY	Chevrolet	150	
11	24	2	Craig Goess	Greenville, NC	Toyota	150	
12	23	39	Dustin Delaney	Mayfield, NY	Chevrolet	150	
13	25	06	Ryan Seaman	Toms River, N.J.	Chevrolet	150	
14	22	16	Max Dumarey	Gent, Belgium	Chevrolet	150	
15	21	52	Jamie Hayes	Norlina, N.C.	Chevrolet	149	
16	28	7	Ryan Duff	Hazard, KY	Chevrolet	147	
17	4	11	Jesus Hernandez	Fresno, CA	Chevrolet	146	
18	2	44	Peyton Sellers	Danville, VA	Chevrolet	146	
19	19	32	Dale Quarterley	Westfield, Mass.	Chevrolet	145	
20	18	71	Eddie MacDonald	Rowley, MA	Chevrolet	133	
21	3	1	Trevor Bayne	Knoxville, TN	Chevrolet	130	Accident
22	13	63	John Salemi	Nashua, N.H.	Dodge	118	Accident
23	30	26	Scott Bouley	Thomaston, Conn.	Chevrolet	89	Rear End
24	7	30	Jeff Anton	Russell, MA	Chevrolet	68	Accident
25	10	95	Tim Andrews	Mooresville, N.C.	Chevrolet	67	Accident
26	15	80	Jason Patison	Corona, Calif.	Chevrolet	67	Accident
27	29	41	James Pritchard Jr.	Wharton, N.J.	Dodge	66	Accident
28	12	37	Alex Kennedy	Aztek, NM	Chevrolet	60	Accident
29	26	21	Jonathan Smith	Beacon Falls, CT	Dodge	53	Accident
30	1	15	Brian Ickler	Poway, CA	Chevrolet	26	Engine
Fastest Qualifier: Brian Ickler, 152.620 mph (245.618 km/h), 23.588 seconds
1 hour 39 minutes 5 seconds
Margin of Victory: 1.495 seconds
Average Speed: 90.833 mph (146.182 km/h)
Laps Lead: Marc Davis 45, Bobby Hamilton Jr. 34, Aric Almirola 27, Matt Kobyluck 11, Matt Hirschman 10, Brian Ickler 9, Peyton Sellers 8, Jesus Hernandez 5, Ricky Carmichael 1
Lead changes: 13 changes involving 9 drivers
Cautions: 6 for 37 laps
Lap Leaders: Peyton Sellers 1-6, Brian Ickler 7-8, Peyton Sellers 9-10, Brian Ickler 11-17, Jesus Hernandez 18-22, Marc Davis 23-44, Aric Almirola 45-56, Matt Kobyluck 57-67, Matt Hirschman 68-77, Bobby Hamilton Jr. 78-111, Marc Davis 112-124, Ricky Carmichael * 125, Marc Davis 126-135, Aric Almirola 136-150

Did not Qualify: (1) Johnny Sauter (#12)

Notes: Aric Almirola became the second driver this year to win his first race in the series on his first start in the series.

Matt Kobyluck became the thirteenth different series champion in the series 22 years.

=== 36th Annual Carquest Fall Final ===
The 36th Annual Carquest Fall Final at Stafford Motor Speedway was originally scheduled to run on September 28; however, due to an unfavorable forecast the race was postponed until the weekend of October 11–12.

While Matt Kobyluck had wrapped up the series championship at Dover, there were still several positions within the top ten in points that were up for grabs.

Brian Ickler was the second to last driver to go out in qualifying and he laid down a lap of 19.376 seconds (new series record at the track) and took the pole. Ickler would lead the first 36 laps of the event before handing the lead over to Ted Christopher on a restart. Peyton Sellers would be the only other driver to lead laps during the race, and between the three of them they exchanged the lead 8 times.

A blistering race speed and a 57-lap green flag run put many cars down a lap and made for an exciting race. A couple of late race cautions kept the leaders within reach of each other. Towards the end of the race NASCAR was getting reports of Christopher's car leaking oil and spent several laps under caution looking for a leak but ended up not bringing him to pit road to take a look at the car. On the final restart on lap 143 Ickler was leading with Christopher on the outside as they came to take the green flag. The two got together and Ickler went spinning into the infield with Christopher taking the lead.

Ickler kept the car running and was able to continue but a caution was not thrown and the race continued under green. Christopher and Sellers were running nose to tail for the lead. Coming out of turn 4 on lap 148 Ickler was directly in front of the leaders and Christopher seemed to have to check up a little bit to not get into Ickler. This led to Sellers getting into the rear of Christopher and sending him spinning towards the outside wall. Sellers would take the lead and the white flag as Christopher came to a rest near the wall out of turn 4. The yellow came out and Sellers crossed the line in first place under the yellow/checkered flags and took the win.

Peyton Sellers would proceed to stop under the flag stand to get the checkered flag and do a little celebrating but all victory lane proceedings would be postponed while the tower reviewed the contact between Sellers and Christopher. Fifteen minutes later word came from the tower that Sellers was the winner of the event. This was Sellers' first win of the season after having a win in the season opener at Greenville-Pickens Speedway taken away from him for an illegal shock absorber.

Official Results
Finish	Start	Car #	Driver	Hometown	Car	Laps	Reason Out
1	8	44	Peyton Sellers	Danville, VA	Chevrolet	150	
2	9	1	Trevor Bayne	Knoxville, TN	Chevrolet	150	
3	18	11	Jesus Hernandez	Fresno, CA	Chevrolet	150	
4	11	3	Austin Dillon	Lewisville, NC	Chevrolet	150	
5	23	71	Eddie MacDonald	Rowley, MA	Chevrolet	150	
6	5	61	Woody Pitkat	Stafford, Conn.	Chevrolet	150	
7	6	40	Matt Kobyluck	Uncasville, CT	Chevrolet	150	
8	14	88	Jody Lavender	Hartsville, SC	Chevrolet	150	
9	20	52	Jamie Hayes	Norlina, N.C.	Chevrolet	150	
10	16	4	Ricky Carmichael	Clearwater, FL	Chevrolet	150	
11	15	8	Ryan Truex	Mayetta, N.J.	Chevrolet	150	
12	2	16	Mike Olsen	N. Haverhill, N.H.	Chevrolet	150	
13	13	18	Marc Davis	Mitchelville, MD	Toyota	150	
14	24	39	Dustin Delaney	Mayfield, NY	Chevrolet	150	
15	12	2	Craig Goess	Greenville, NC	Toyota	150	
16	3	9	Kevin Swindell	Germantown, Tenn.	Dodge	150	
17	25	38	Alan Tardiff	Lyman, Maine	Chevrolet	150	
18	1	15	Brian Ickler	Poway, CA	Chevrolet	149	
19	7	99	Bryon Chew	Mattituck, NY	Chevrolet	149	
20	4	31	Ted Christopher	Plainville, Conn.	Chevrolet	148	
21	22	30	Jeff Anton	Russell, MA	Chevrolet	148	
22	19	7	Alan Purkhiser	Moore, S.C.	Chevrolet	148	
23	26	21	Jonathan Smith	Beacon Falls, CT	Chevrolet	148	
24	17	96	Mike Johnson	Salisbury, Mass.	Ford	136	
25	28	41	James Pritchard Jr.	Wharton, N.J.	Dodge	115	
26	10	35	Steve Park	East Northport, NY	Chevrolet	104	Brakes
27	21	01	Charles Lewandoski	Stafford Springs, Conn.	Toyota	58	Ignition
28	27	26	Scott Bouley	Thomaston, Conn.	Chevrolet	41	Radiator
Fastest Qualifier: Brian Ickler, 92.898 mph (149.505 km/h), 19.376 seconds
Time of Race: 1 hours, 9 minutes, 50 seconds
Margin of Victory: Under Yellow
Average Speed: 64.439 mph (103.705 km/h)
Laps Lead: Brian Ickler 66, Ted Christopher 42, Peyton Sellers 42
Lead changes: 8 changes involving 3 drivers
Cautions: 8 for 30 laps
Lap Leaders: Brian Ickler 1-36, Ted Christopher 37-45, Peyton Sellers 46-85, Ted Christopher 86-111, Brian Ickler 112-135, Ted Christopher 136, Brian Ickler 137-142, Ted Christopher 143-148, Peyton Sellers 149-150

Did not Qualify: None

=== Toyota All-Star Showdown ===
The Toyota All-Star Showdown was moved to January of the next year from its traditional October date in order to allow the race to keep a "post-season" feel, this race is a 2008 Camping World Series race, per NASCAR rulebook, since it is run with 2008 rules, and not 2009 rules (e.g., 2008 approved equipment only; no 2009 approved equipment was allowed to be run, and no 2009 rules applied).

The East-West showdown format favoured the West in qualifying, as six of the top ten drivers in qualifying were West drivers, with only two East Series regulars making the top ten, along with defending champion Joey Logano (who was not an East Series regular in 2008) and Mexico Series champion Antonio Pérez.

West Series champion Eric Holmes was among the leaders of the first 100 laps, along with East Series driver Brian Ickler (originally from California; moved to the Charlotte area to race in the East Series in 2008), who led 98 laps throughout the night. Holmes dropped back because of a dragging part on the start of the second segment. On Lap 141, Ron Hornaday Jr. ran into the side of Ickler, and caused an incident that led to a nine-minute red flag as 22 cars were involved, either by the crash or being stuck behind the wreckage.

On Lap 250, Logano raced Peyton Sellers, who has a Nationwide Series ride for 2009, hard, running into Sellers to cause a spin in turn three. Logano crossed the line first but was disqualified by NASCAR for unsportsmanlike conduct. East Series champion Matt Kobyluck, who did not lead a single lap and crashed in practice, going to his 2006 Showdown-winning car, finished second but was declared the winner.

East driver Trevor Bayne was second, and West driver Jason Bowles, who drove a car for this race purchased from East Series team owner Andy Santerre, who supported the team (he did not bring his regular team with him to the Showdown) was third.

There were 13 cautions in the race.

Official Results
Finish	Start	Car #	Driver	Car	Laps	Money Won	Reason Out
1	23	40	Matt Kobyluck	Chevrolet	250	$34,500	Running
2	6	1	Trevor Bayne	Chevrolet	250	23,630	Running
3	2	6	Jason Bowles	Ford	250	17,000	Running
4	30	8	Johnny Borneman III	Chevrolet	250	15,500	Running
5	39	45	Matt Crafton	Toyota	250	16,000	Running
6	13	33	Ron Hornaday Jr.	Chevrolet	250	10,000	Running
7	16	2	Mike David	Toyota	250	10,000	Running
8	20	18	Marc Davis	Toyota	250	11,500	Running
9	22	01	Jim Inglebright	Chevrolet	250	9,200	Running
10	11	14	David Mayhew	Chevrolet	250	8,750	Running
11	15	37	Alex Kennedy	Chevrolet	250	7,500	Running
12	24	13	Todd Souza	Chevrolet	250	7,250	Running
13	27	16	Moses Smith	Toyota	250	7,500	Running
14	21	83	Peyton Sellers	Chevrolet	249	9,250	Accident
15	40	10	Jim Warn	Chevrolet	249	7,000	Running
16	31	17	Jason Patison	Chevrolet	249	6,800	Running
17	18	9	Auggie Vidovich II	Ford	247	5,700	Running
18	8	12	Antonio Pérez	Dodge	245	8,600	Running
19	34	88	Jamie Dick	Chevrolet	238	6,550	Running
20	14	51	Alex Haase	Chevrolet	233	5,500	Engine
21	37	61	Brett Thompson	Chevrolet	231	6,400	Running
22	4	20	Eric Holmes	Toyota	219	6,300	Running
23	29	35	Steve Park	Chevrolet	201	8,250	Running
24	36	58	Jarit Johnson	Chevrolet	197	5,200	Running
25	17	44	Eric Richardson	Chevrolet	194	5,150	Running
26	7	29	Nick Lynch	Dodge	188	5,100	Suspension
27	12	71	Eddie MacDonald	Chevrolet	181	8,100	Accident
28	26	25	Jason Fensler	Chevrolet	155	5,100	Accident
29	1	50	Chris Johnson	Ford	154	8,100	Accident
30	19	3	Austin Dillon	Chevrolet	153	8,100	Running
31	3	15	Brian Ickler	Chevrolet	144	8,100	Accident
32	35	77	Andrew Myers	Toyota	144	5,000	Accident
33	5	46	Jeff Barkshire	Dodge	144	6,000	Accident
34	28	4	Ricky Carmichael	Chevrolet	142	8,000	Accident
35	38	34	Jonathon Gomez	Chevrolet	53	5,000	Accident
36	9	41	Ryan Foster	Ford	46	5,000	Accident
37	32	52	Jamie Hayes	Chevrolet	9	8,000	Accident
38	25	22	Scott Steckly	Chevrolet	8	8,000	Accident
39	33	28	John Salemi	Dodge	8	5,000	Accident
40	10	08	Joey Logano	Toyota	250	5,000	Penalty
Coors Pole Award: Chris Johnson, Time: 18.299 Seconds, Speed: 98.366 mph (158.305 km/h)
Time of Race: 2 hrs., 20 mins, 18 secs
Margin of Victory: .482 Seconds
Average race speed: 53.457 mph (86.031 km/h)
Lead changes: 18 among 8 drivers
Cautions: 13 for 86 laps (does not include Lap 100 intermission; Lap 200 intermission ended caution period on Lap 195)

Did not qualify out of 50-lap "last chance qualifier" was held after qualifying. The top six advanced.: (16) Blake Koch (#21), Joey Polewarczyk Jr. (#03), Daryl Harr (#00), Keith Spangler (#39), Brian Wong (#89), Marcus Zukanovic (#99), Tony Toste (#91), Stan Silva Jr. (#65), Paul Pedroncelli Jr. (#0), Billy Kann (#78), Kyle Kelley (#7), Dakoda Armstrong (#5), Wes Banks (#31), Rod Johnson Jr. (#04), Terry Henry (#19), Greg Pursley (#26).

NOTE: Logano crossed the line first but was penalised for rough driving in the Lap 250 crash with Sellers.

== Points standings ==
Final Points Standings
Pos	Car #	Driver	Total	Att	Starts	Poles	Wins	Top5s	Top10s	DNFs
1	40	Matt Kobyluck	2126	13	13		4	9	12	
2	3	Austin Dillon	1916	13	13	1	1	6	10	
3	11	Jesus Hernandez	1857	13	13			5	8	
4	1	Trevor Bayne	1855	13	13	2	1	6	8	1
5	18	Marc Davis	1812	13	13			4	7	
6	4	Ricky Carmichael	1745	13	13	1		3	8	1
7	71	Eddie MacDonald	1733	13	13		2	6	6	2
8	44	Peyton Sellers	1732	13	13	3	1	5	6	
9	35	Steve Park	1727	13	13			3	8	1
10	15	Brian Ickler	1644	13	13	2	3	3	5	4
11	88	Jody Lavender	1637	13	12			1	6	
12	30	Jeff Anton	1502	13	13				3	2
13	39	Dustin Delaney	1501	13	12					
14	52	Jamie Hayes	1483	13	13				3	1
15	8	Jeffrey Earnhardt	1416	11	11			4	6	1
16	2	Craig Goess	1413	12	12			1	2	1
17	16	Max Dumarey	1395	12	11				2	2
18	99	Bryon Chew	1263	11	11	1			3	3
19	21	Jonathan Smith	1219	13	13					6
20	7	Ryan Duff	1203	12	11					3
21	03	Rogelio López	940	8	8				2	
22	63	John Salemi	836	8	7				2	3
23	80	Derek Thorn	797	7	6			1	2	
24	41	James Pritchard Jr.	632	8	7					4
25	26	Scott Bouley	628	7	7					2
26	61	Mike Olsen	574	4	4			1	3	
27	96	Mike Johnson	473	5	5					2
28	37	Alex Kennedy	444	5	5				1	3
29	38	Alan Tardiff	424	4	4					
30	55	Brad Leighton	405	3	3			1	2	
31	59	Richard Johns	397	4	3					
32	27	Chase Mattioli	397	4	4					1
33	50	Todd Peck	374	5	4					3
34	75	Tim Cowen	369	3	3				1	
35	91	Ben Stancill	365	3	3			1	1	1
36	72	Jason Cochran	334	4	3					1
37	9	Matt Hirschman	315	2	2			1	2	
38	12	Antonio Pérez	303	3	3				1	2
39	95	Bobby Hamilton Jr.	297	3	3			1	1	2
40	03	Joey Polewarczyk	265	2	2				1	
41	37	Kyle Cattanach	247	2	2				1	
42	9	Kevin Swindell	239	2	2					
43	58	Richard Gould	234	3	2					1
44	81	Jason Holehouse	228	2	2				1	1
45	22	Eric Lux	224	2	2					
46	31	James Buescher	200	2	1					
47	32	Dale Quarterley	194	2	2					1
48	01	Charles Lewandoski	191	2	2					1
49	8	Aric Almirola	185	1	1		1	1	1	
50	89	Larry Moloney	176	2	1					
51	9	Kasey Kahne	175	1	1			1	1	
52	25	Jeremy Clark	173	2	2					1
53	17	A. J. Henriksen	170	2	1					
54	05	Guy Pierre Pavageau	161	2	1					1
55	14	Joe Masessa	158	2	2					1
56	31	Eric Curran	155	1	1				1	
57	61	Woody Pitkat	150	1	1				1	
58	10	Daniel Pope II	140	2	1					1
59	28	Buster Bennet	134	1	1				1	
60	81	Mark McFarland	134	1	1					
61	8	Ryan Truex	134	1	1					
62	08	Joe Oliver	128	2	1					
63	06	Ryan Seaman	124	1	1					
64	33	Johnny Petrozelle	119	2	1					
65	93	Ian Henderson	119	2	1					1
66	65	Levi Arthur	112	1	1					
67	31	Ted Christopher	108	1	1					
68	65	Stan Silva	106	1	1					
69	36	Michael Faulk	97	1	0					
70	23	Tim George Jr.	97	1	1					1
71	95	Sterling Marlin	97	1	1					1
72	7	Alan Purkhiser	97	1	1					
73	95	Tim Andrews	88	1	1					1
74	37	Nick de Bruijn	85	1	1					1
75	80	Jason Patison	85	1	1					1
76	17	Alessandro Ciompi	79	1	1					1
77	28	Ryan Preece	73	1	0					
78	2	Justin Lofton	73	1	1					1
79	45	Ryan Black	73	1	1					1
80	24	Patrick Dupree	70	1	1					1
81	12	Johnny Sauter	70	1	0					
82	13	Laine Chase	49	1	1					1

^{*} Denotes a rookie of the year candidate

== Season-ending awards ==
Season Ending Awards
Award	Winner
Happy Camper Award	Matt Kobyluck
Goodyear Tire Award	Matt Kobyluck
Champion Car Owner Award	Matt Kobyluck
Lunati Champion Crew Chief Award	Perry Waite
2008 Champion Sponsor Award	Mohegan Sun
Aero Exhaust Lap Leader Award	Marc Davis
POWERAde Power Move of the Race Award	Eddie MacDonald
Featherlite Most Improved Driver Award	Eddie MacDonald
Most Popular Driver Award	Ricky Carmichael
Bunk Sampson Memorial Award	Stub Fadden
NASCAR Camping World Series East Women's Auxiliary Award	Alisha Ziner & Setphanie Petfield
Driver Achievement Award	Jeff Anton
Sportsmanship Award	#40 Mohegan Sun Resort Team
Rookie of the Year Award	Austin Dillon

== See also ==
- 2008 NASCAR Sprint Cup Series
- 2008 NASCAR Nationwide Series
- 2008 NASCAR Craftsman Truck Series
- 2008 ARCA Re/Max Series
- 2008 NASCAR Whelen Modified Tour
- 2008 NASCAR Whelen Southern Modified Tour
- 2008 NASCAR Camping World West Series
- 2008 NASCAR Canadian Tire Series
- 2008 NASCAR Corona Series
