= Marc Davis (racing driver) =

American racing driver (born 1990)

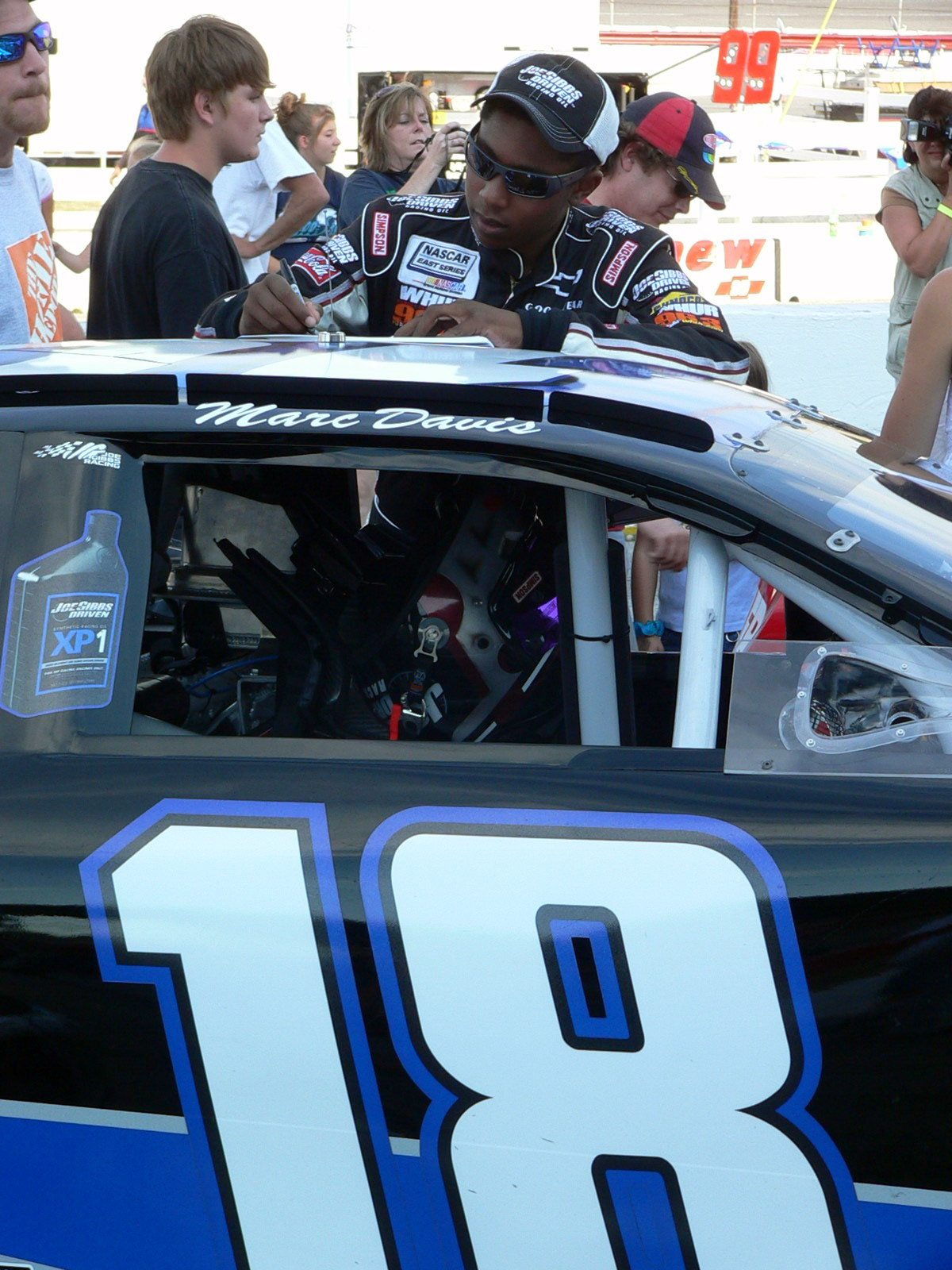
- Davis at Nashville Fairgrounds Speedway in 2007
- Born: June 23, 1990 (age 36); Silver Spring, Maryland, U.S.

NASCAR O'Reilly Auto Parts Series career
- 10 races run over 4 years
- Best finish: 76th (2008)
- First race: 2008 Kroger On Track for the Cure 250 (Memphis)
- Last race: 2011 Federated Auto Parts 300 (Nashville)
Wins	Top tens	Poles
0	0	0

NASCAR FedEx Freight Truck Series career
- 3 races run over 2 years
- Best finish: 70th (2009)
- First race: 2008 Camping World 200 (Gateway)
- Last race: 2009 Ford 200 (Homestead)
Wins	Top tens	Poles
0	0	0
- Statistics up to date as of October 29, 2012.

Marc Davis (born June 23, 1990) is an American former stock car racing developmental driver for Joe Gibbs Racing. He has previously competed in the NASCAR Nationwide Series, the NASCAR Camping World Truck Series, and the ARCA Re/Max Series.

== Racing career ==
Davis grew up in Colesville, Maryland as the son of an F-1 boat racer. He began competing in BMX, achieving US-2 and Gold Cup #1 rankings. He moved to quarter midgets at the age of eight, followed by Junior Dragsters. He spent three years racing Bandoleros before moving to legends. At the age of 13, he was in this third year racing legends when he won two 2003 national legends car championships in the Dirt and Road Course Young Lion divisions, becoming the first champion to win both championships in the same season. He moved to Mooresville, North Carolina to pursue a career in racing. He won six of twelve limited late model races for JGR at Hickory Motor Speedway in 2006. His March 25, 2006 victory at the track was the track's second victory by an African American.

In 2007, Davis recorded a season best second-place finish, five top fives, and seven top-ten finishes in thirteen events. He finished ninth in points. He also competed in his first ARCA event, finishing fourth for veteran Bill Venturini. He is scheduled to racing the Camping World East in 2008 along with four ARCA events. He rang the closing bell at the New York Stock Exchange on February 6, 2008 for Black History Month. He made his major league NASCAR debut late in 2008, driving the No. 81 Randy Moss Motorsports Chevrolet at Gateway International Raceway in the Craftsman Truck Series. He finished 16th.

Davis then finished the 2008 Camping World East season with a top-ten finish in Irwindale at the Toyota All-Star Showdown.

In 2009, Davis drove selected races in both the Nationwide Series and Camping World Truck Series for his own team. In Nationwide, Davis made five attempts and qualified for four races in the No. 10/No. 36 Toyota with a best finish of 25th at Nashville Superspeedway. In the Truck Series, he attempted and qualified for two races in the No. 19 Chevrolet, finishing 18th at Martinsville and 32nd at Homestead.

In 2010, Davis would pull out of the Nationwide Series race at Daytona due to the death of his father. He was scheduled to race for Xxxtreme Motorsport in their No. 58 Chevrolet. Davis would make one start in 2010, at Dover finishing 23rd.

Davis returned to NASCAR in 2011, start and parking the No. 03 for R3 Motorsports.

== Personal life ==
Davis graduated from Mooresville Christian Academy in May 2008.

Davis used to work for Hendrick BMW in North Carolina.

== Motorsports career results ==
=== NASCAR ===
(key) (Bold – Pole position awarded by qualifying time. Italics – Pole position earned by points standings or practice time. * – Most laps led.)

==== Nationwide Series ====
NASCAR Nationwide Series results
Year	Team	No.	Make	1	2	3	4	5	6	7	8	9	10	11	12	13	14	15	16	17	18	19	20	21	22	23	24	25	26	27	28	29	30	31	32	33	34	35	NNSC	Pts	Ref
2008	Joe Gibbs Racing	18	Toyota	DAY	CAL	LVS	ATL	BRI	NSH	TEX	PHO	MXC	TAL	RCH	DAR	CLT	DOV	NSH	KEN	MLW	NHA	DAY	CHI	GTY	IRP	CGV	GLN	MCH	BRI	CAL	RCH	DOV	KAN	CLT	MEM; 23				76th	331	
2008	Fitz Motorsports	22	Dodge																																	TEX; 30	PHO; 27	HOM; 27	76th	331	
2009	Marc Davis Motorsports	36	Toyota	DAY	CAL	LVS	BRI; 27	TEX	NSH	PHO	TAL	RCH; 29	DAR	CLT; DNQ																									83rd	307	
2009	Braun Motorsports	10	Toyota												DOV; 34	NSH; 25	KEN	MLW	NHA	DAY	CHI	GTY	IRP	IOW	GLN	MCH	BRI	CGV	ATL	RCH	DOV	KAN	CAL	CLT	MEM	TEX	PHO	HOM	83rd	307	
2010	R3 Motorsports	23	Chevy	DAY	CAL	LVS	BRI	NSH	PHO	TEX	TAL	RCH	DAR	DOV	CLT	NSH	KEN	ROA	NHA	DAY	CHI	GTY	IRP	IOW	GLN	MCH	BRI	CGV	ATL	RCH	DOV; 23	KAN	CAL	CLT	GTY	TEX	PHO	HOM	117th	94	
2011	R3 Motorsports	03	Chevy	DAY	PHO	LVS	BRI	CAL	TEX	TAL	NSH	RCH	DAR	DOV	IOW	CLT	CHI	MCH	ROA	DAY	KEN	NHA	NSH; 43	IRP	IOW	GLN	CGV	BRI	ATL	RCH	CHI	DOV; DNQ	KAN	CLT	TEX	PHO	HOM		140th	0^{1}	

==== Camping World Truck Series ====
NASCAR Camping World Truck Series results
Year	Team	No.	Make	1	2	3	4	5	6	7	8	9	10	11	12	13	14	15	16	17	18	19	20	21	22	23	24	25	NCWTC	Pts	Ref
2008	Randy Moss Motorsports	81	Chevy	DAY	CAL	ATL	MAR	KAN	CLT	MFD	DOV	TEX	MCH	MLW	MEM	KEN	IRP	NSH	BRI	GTW; 16	NHA	LVS	TAL	MAR	ATL	TEX	PHO	HOM	77th	115	
2009	Marc Davis Motorsports	19	Chevy	DAY	CAL	ATL	MAR	KAN	CLT	DOV	TEX	MCH	MLW	MEM	KEN	IRP	NSH	BRI	CHI	IOW	GTW	NHA	LVS	MAR; 18	TAL	TEX	PHO	HOM; 32	70th	176	

^{*} Season still in progress
^{1} Ineligible for series points

==== K&N Pro Series East ====
NASCAR K&N Pro Series East results
Year	Team	No.	Make	1	2	3	4	5	6	7	8	9	10	11	12	13	NKNPSEC	Pts	Ref
2007	Joe Gibbs Racing	18	Chevy	GRE; 12				STA; 4	NHA; 28	TMP; 28	NSH; 3	ADI; 3	LRP; 25	MFD; 6	NHA; 21		9th	1654	
2007	Joe Gibbs Racing	92	Chevy		ELK; 17	IOW; 15	SBO; 4									DOV; 7	9th	1654	
2008	Joe Gibbs Racing	18	Toyota	GRE; 2	IOW; 21*	SBO; 9	GLN; 13*	NHA; 6	TMP; 4	NSH; 17	ADI; 10	LRP; 2	MFD; 19	NHA; 18	DOV; 2*	STA; 13	5th	1812	
2010	Rev Racing	8	Chevy	GRE	SBO	IOW	MAR	NHA	LRP	LEE; 8	JFC	NHA	DOV				48th	142	

==== Camping World West Series ====
NASCAR K&N Pro Series West results
Year	Team	No.	Make	1	2	3	4	5	6	7	8	9	10	11	12	13	NCWWC	Pts	Ref
2007	Joe Gibbs Racing	92	Chevy	CTS; 12	PHO; 2	AMP	ELK	IOW	CNS	SON; 7	DCS	IRW	MMP	EVG	CSR	AMP	29th	443	
2008	Joe Gibbs Racing	92	Toyota	AAS	PHO; 17	CTS	IOW	CNS	SON	IRW	DCS	EVG	MMP	IRW	AMP	AAS	60th	117	

=== ARCA Re/Max Series ===
(key) (Bold – Pole position awarded by qualifying time. Italics – Pole position earned by points standings or practice time. * – Most laps led.)

ARCA Re/Max Series results
Year	Team	No.	Make	1	2	3	4	5	6	7	8	9	10	11	12	13	14	15	16	17	18	19	20	21	22	23	ARSC	Pts	Ref
2007	Venturini Motorsports	25	Chevy	DAY	USA	NSH	SLM	KAN	WIN	KEN	TOL	IOW	POC	MCH	BLN	KEN	POC	NSH	ISF	MIL	GTW	DSF	CHI	SLM	TAL	TOL; 4	104th	210	
2008	Venturini Motorsports	15	Toyota	DAY	SLM	IOW	KAN	CAR	KEN	TOL	POC	MCH	CAY	KEN	BLN	POC; 8	NSH	ISF	DSF	CHI	SLM	NJE					87th	220	
2008	Venturini Motorsports	8	Toyota																				TAL; 40	TOL			87th	220	

^{*} Season still in progress
^{1} Ineligible for series points
