= Jonathan Smith (racing driver) =

American racing driver

- Nationality: (United States) American
- Born: November 3, 1986 (age 40) Beacon Falls, Connecticut

NASCAR K&N Pro Series East career
- Debut season: 2007
- Former teams: Motion Racing, Troy Williams Racing with Sean Watts, Fadden Racing
- Starts: 38
- Wins: 0
- Poles: 0
- Best finish: 11th in 2009
- Finished last season: 41st (2010)
- Statistics up to date as of May 9, 2020.

Jonathan Smith (born November 3, 1986) is an American former professional stock car racing driver who competed in the NASCAR East Series full-time for three years from 2007 to 2009. In 2010, his most recent season as a driver, Smith ran part-time in the same series.

== Racing career ==
Smith started racing at the age of five on dirtbikes, and by the age of 12, he was racing BMX bicycles, where he was crowned State Champion in his first year. At the age of 14, Smith began racing go-karts in the Nite Series at Poughkeepsie Speedway in New York proving himself in his first year by finishing in second place in both series' championships. In his second year of competition, Smith moved to Stock Light division, Poughkeepsie Speedway's most competitive go-karting class, where he took home the championship. In 2001, Smith decided to take a break from racing to focus on high school.

When he returned to racing the spring of 2006, Smith entered into automobile racing in the Dodge Weekly Series driving a late-model in the NASCAR sanctioned division. In his rookie season, with the help of Ryan Posocco Racing, Smith's team ran at Stafford Motor Speedway in Stafford Springs, Connecticut and finished in the top-three of the championship race, and as the runner up in the Rookie of the Year competition. Smith's talent did not go unnoticed, and he was selected to participate in the NASCAR Drive for Diversity program where he was placed with veteran Barney McRae and Motion Racing in 2007. During this season, Smith debuted in the NASCAR Busch East Series, NASCAR's top developmental racing series. Smith finished the year 16th in the point standings, scoring a top-five finish in only his second series race. In 2008, Smith joined Troy Williams Racing with Sean Watts to pilot their No. 21 Aqua Pure Health/Raintree Vacations Dodge in the newly named Camping World Series East (formerly Busch East, currently K&N Pro Series). He also drove in the NASCAR Drive for Diversity program for a second season that year. In the 2009 season, Smith was brought on by two time series champion Mike Olsen and Fadden Racing. He returned to Fadden in 2010 to run a limited schedule, but has not raced in the East Series or any other series since then.

== Motorsports career results ==
=== NASCAR ===
(key) (Bold – Pole position awarded by qualifying time. Italics – Pole position earned by points standings or practice time. * – Most laps led.)

==== K&N Pro Series East ====
NASCAR K&N Pro Series East results
| Year | Team | No. | Make | 1 | 2 | 3 | 4 | 5 | 6 | 7 | 8 | 9 | 10 | 11 | 12 | 13 | NKNPSEC | Pts | Ref |
|---|---|---|---|---|---|---|---|---|---|---|---|---|---|---|---|---|---|---|---|
| 2007 | Motion Racing | 5 | Chevy | GRE; DNQ | | | SBO; 18 | STA; 22 | NHA; 34 | TMP; 21 | NSH; 25 | ADI; 25 | LRP; 14 | MFD; 13 | NHA; 19 | DOV; 21 | 16th | 1286 | |
| 2007 | Motion Racing | 51 | Chevy | | ELK; 15 | IOW; 5 | | | | | | | | | | | 16th | 1286 | |
| 2008 | Troy Williams Racing with Sean Watts | 21 | Dodge | GRE; 20 | | SBO; 18 | GLN; 28 | | TMP; 13 | MCM; 25 | ADI; 22 | LRP; 32 | MFD; 22 | NHA; 32 | DOV; 29 | STA; 23 | 19th | 1219 | |
| 2008 | Troy Williams Racing with Sean Watts | 21 | Chevy | | | | | NHA; 17 | | | | | | | | | 19th | 1219 | |
| 2008 | Troy Williams Racing with Sean Watts | 12 | Dodge | | IOW; 19 | | | | | | | | | | | | 19th | 1219 | |
| 2009 | Fadden Racing | 16 | Chevy | GRE; 19 | TRI; 22 | | SBO; 14 | GLN; 10 | NHA; 21 | TMP; 9 | ADI; 12 | LRP; 15 | NHA; 19 | DOV; 16 | | | 11th | 1277 | |
| 2009 | Fadden Racing | 76 | Chevy | | | IOW; 16 | | | | | | | | | | | 11th | 1277 | |
| 2010 | Fadden Racing | 16 | Chevy | GRE | SBO | IOW | MAR | NHA; 23 | | | | | | | | | 41st | 218 | |
| 2010 | Fadden Racing | 61 | Chevy | | | | | | LRP; 13 | LEE | JFC | NHA | DOV | | | | 41st | 218 | |
