= Brian Ickler =

American racing driver (born 1985)

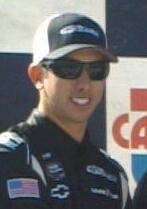
- Ickler in 2008
- Born: September 17, 1985 (age 41); San Diego, California, U.S.

NASCAR O'Reilly Auto Parts Series career
- 8 races run over 3 years
- Best finish: 66th (2010)
- First race: 2008 Hefty Odor Block 200 (Phoenix)
- Last race: 2010 Food City 250 (Bristol)
Wins	Top tens	Poles
0	1	0

NASCAR FedEx Freight Truck Series career
- 27 races run over 4 years
- 2014 position: 37th
- Best finish: 24th (2009)
- First race: 2009 O'Reilly Auto Parts 250 (Kansas)
- Last race: 2014 Rhino Linings 350 (Las Vegas)
Wins	Top tens	Poles
0	12	1
- Statistics up to date as of September 27, 2014.

Brian Ickler (born September 17, 1985) is an American former professional stock car racing driver.

== Racing career ==
=== Early career ===
Ickler started in off-road racing when he was 14 years old. At the age of 17, he was SCORE rookie of the year, Lite champion, and the winner of the SCORE Baja 1000, Baja 500, and San Felipe 250. In 2005, Ickler raced his first year on an oval track at Irwindale Speedway in the NASCAR Weekly Racing Series Super Late Model Division. In his rookie season, he earned his first win in the NASCAR Hot Wheels 200. In 2006, Ickler signed with Bill McAnally Racing to drive the No. 20 NAPA Filters Chevrolet in the NASCAR AutoZone West Series. He recorded a first-place finish in the qualifying race at the Toyota All-Star Showdown and finished fifth. Ickler drove the No. 16 NAPA Auto Parts Chevrolet for the 2007 West Series season. He finished the season fourth in the championship standings and led the series with three wins. Ickler was awarded the NASCAR GNW Driver Achievement award two years in a row (2006, 2007) for his accomplishments in the series. In 2008, he relocated to Mooresville, North Carolina and ran the full NASCAR Camping World East Series schedule, where he earned three wins, two poles, and two track records. He led the series in laps led, leading 26 percent of total laps raced.

=== NASCAR national series ===
In 2008, Ickler made his Nationwide Series debut, finishing 34th at Phoenix International Raceway in the No. 55 Dodge for Robby Gordon Motorsports.

In 2009, Ickler made 11 starts in the Camping World Truck Series for Billy Ballew Motorsports. He also had two starts in the Nationwide Series for Braun Racing and six starts in the ARCA Re/Max Series in his own Ickler Motorsports entry. In the Truck Series, he has two top-fives, three top-tens, and one pole. He also had two DNFs. In his two Nationwide Series starts, he finished 32nd and 26th at Iowa Speedway and Memphis Motorsports Park, respectively.

In the 2010 NASCAR Camping World Truck Series, Ickler was scheduled to share the No. 18 Toyota Tundra with team owner Kyle Busch. The truck was to be sponsored by Miccosukee Indian Gaming, but the tribe pulled out of all NASCAR sponsorship.

Ickler ran four races for the team in 2011, before taking two years off from NASCAR competition; he returned to the Camping World Truck Series in 2014, driving the No. 7 Toyota for Red Horse Racing. However, on May 20, the team was shut down.

=== Other racing ===
In 2016, Ickler ran the Stadium Super Trucks race weekend at the Charlotte Dirt Track; driving the No. 15 Arctic Cat truck, he finished sixth and eighth.

== Motorsports career results ==
=== NASCAR ===
(key) (Bold – Pole position awarded by qualifying time. Italics – Pole position earned by points standings or practice time. * – Most laps led.)

==== Nationwide Series ====
NASCAR Nationwide Series results
Year	Team	No.	Make	1	2	3	4	5	6	7	8	9	10	11	12	13	14	15	16	17	18	19	20	21	22	23	24	25	26	27	28	29	30	31	32	33	34	35	NNSC	Pts	Ref
2008	Robby Gordon Motorsports	55	Dodge	DAY	CAL	LVS	ATL	BRI	NSH	TEX	PHO	MXC	TAL	RCH	DAR	CLT	DOV	NSH	KEN	MLW	NHA	DAY	CHI	GTY	IRP	CGV	GLN	MCH	BRI	CAL	RCH	DOV	KAN	CLT	MEM	TEX	PHO; 34	HOM	131st	61	
2009	Braun Racing	32	Toyota	DAY	CAL	LVS	BRI	TEX	NSH	PHO	TAL	RCH	DAR	CLT	DOV	NSH	KEN	MLW	NHA	DAY	CHI	GTY	IRP; QL^{†}	IOW; 32	GLN	MCH	BRI	CGV	ATL	RCH	DOV	KAN	CAL	CLT	MEM; 26	TEX	PHO	HOM	111th	152	
2010	Roush Fenway Racing	16	Ford	DAY	CAL	LVS	BRI	NSH	PHO	TEX	TAL	RCH	DAR	DOV	CLT; 15	NSH; 29		ROA	NHA	DAY; 9	CHI	GTY	IRP	IOW	GLN	MCH	BRI; 19	CGV	ATL	RCH	DOV	KAN	CAL	CLT; 12	GTY	TEX; 15	PHO	HOM; 16	66th	559	
2010	Roush Fenway Racing	6	Ford														KEN; 14																						66th	559	
^{†} - Qualified for David Reutimann

==== Camping World Truck Series ====
NASCAR Camping World Truck Series results
Year	Team	No.	Make	1	2	3	4	5	6	7	8	9	10	11	12	13	14	15	16	17	18	19	20	21	22	23	24	25	NCWTC	Pts	Ref
2009	Billy Ballew Motorsports	51	Toyota	DAY	CAL	ATL	MAR	KAN; 5			TEX; 22		MLW; 15	MEM; 12	KEN; 21	IRP	NSH	BRI	CHI	IOW; 18									24th	1340	
2009	Billy Ballew Motorsports	15	Toyota						CLT; 16	DOV; 25		**MCH**; 3									GTW; 15	NHA	LVS; 9	MAR	TAL	TEX	PHO	HOM	24th	1340	
2010	Kyle Busch Motorsports	18	Toyota	DAY	ATL	MAR; 3	NSH	KAN; 4	DOV	CLT	TEX	MCH	IOW; 13	GTY; 9	IRP	POC	NSH; 8	DAR; 21	BRI	CHI	KEN	NHA	LVS; 7	MAR	TAL	TEX	PHO	HOM	29th	980	
2011	Kyle Busch Motorsports	18	Toyota	DAY	PHO	DAR	MAR	NSH	DOV	CLT	KAN	TEX; 4	KEN	IOW; 14	NSH	IRP	POC	MCH	BRI	ATL	CHI	NHA	KEN; 5	LVS; 28	TAL	MAR	TEX	HOM	43rd	86	
2014	Red Horse Racing	7	Toyota	DAY; 33	MAR; 10	KAN; 27	CLT; 23	DOV	TEX	GTW	KEN	IOW	ELD	POC	MCH	BRI	MSP	CHI	NHA	LVS; 5	TAL	MAR	TEX	PHO	HOM				37th	122	

==== Camping World East Series ====
NASCAR Camping World East Series results
Year	Team	No.	Make	1	2	3	4	5	6	7	8	9	10	11	12	13	NCWEC	Pts	Ref
2007	Bill McAnally Racing	15	Chevy	GRE	ELK	IOW	SBO	STA	NHA	TMP	NSH	ADI	LRP	MFD; 11	NHA	DOV; 29	47th	206	
2008	Ickler Motorsports	15	Chevy	GRE; 14	IOW; 1	SBO; 1*	GLN; 24	NHA; 10	TMP; 19	NSH; 8	ADI; 24	LRP; 19	MFD; 1*	NHA; 29	**DOV**; 30	**STA**; 18*	10th	1644	
2009	Ickler Motorsports	15	Chevy	GRE; 1*	TRI	IOW; 2	SBO	GLN	NHA	TMP	ADI	LRP	NHA	DOV			31st	360	

==== Camping World West Series ====
NASCAR Camping World West Series results
Year	Team	No.	Make	1	2	3	4	5	6	7	8	9	10	11	12	13	NCWWC	Pts	Ref
2006	Bill McAnally Racing	20	Chevy	PHO; 6	PHO; 16	S99; 19	IRW; 8	SON; 2	DCS; 13	IRW; 27	EVG; 17	S99; 12	CAL; 7	CTS; 2	AMP; 8		9th	1591	
2007	Bill McAnally Racing	16	Chevy	CTS; 23	PHO; 33	AMP; 13	**ELK**; 7	IOW; 12	**CNS**; 15*	SON; 6	DCS; 1	IRW; 1*	MMP; 6	EVG; 1*	CSR; 2	**AMP**; 16	4th	1838	
2009	Ickler Motorsports	51	Toyota	CTS	AAS	PHO	MAD	IOW	DCS	SON	IRW	PIR	MMP	CNS	IOW; 8	AAS	53rd	142	

=== ARCA Re/Max Series ===
(key) (Bold – Pole position awarded by qualifying time. Italics – Pole position earned by points standings or practice time. * – Most laps led.)

ARCA Re/Max Series results
Year	Team	No.	Make	1	2	3	4	5	6	7	8	9	10	11	12	13	14	15	16	17	18	19	20	21	ARMC	Pts	Ref
2009	Ickler Motorsports	8	Toyota	DAY	SLM	CAR; 20	TAL																		27th	1390	
2009	Ickler Motorsports	51	Toyota					KEN; 4	TOL	POC			IOW; 5	**KEN**; 5	BLN	POC	ISF	**CHI**; 4	TOL	DSF	NJE	SLM			27th	1390	
2009	Ickler Motorsports	61	Toyota								MCH; 35	MFD												CAR; DNQ	27th	1390	
2009	Ickler Motorsports	52	Toyota																				KAN; 33		27th	1390	

=== Stadium Super Trucks ===
(key) (Bold – Pole position. Italics – Fastest qualifier. * – Most laps led.)

Stadium Super Trucks results
Year	1	2	3	4	5	6	7	8	9	10	11	12	13	14	15	16	17	18	19	20	21	22	SSTC	Pts	Ref
2016	ADE	ADE	ADE	STP	STP	LBH	LBH	DET	DET	DET	TOW	TOW	TOW	TOR	TOR	CLT; 6	CLT; 8	OCF	OCF	SRF	SRF	SRF	26th	28	

^{*} Season still in progress
^{1} Ineligible for series points
