= Jesus Hernandez (racing driver) =

American racing driver (born 1981)

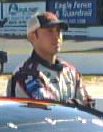
- Hernandez in 2008
- Nationality: (United States) American
- Born: April 1, 1981 (age 45) Fresno, California, U.S.

NASCAR Camping World East Series career
- Debut season: 2007
- Former teams: Ginn Racing, Dale Earnhardt, Inc., Troy Williams Racing
- Starts: 34
- Wins: 0
- Poles: 0
- Best finish: 3rd in 2008
- Finished last season: 12th (2009)

Previous series
- 2007 2007, 2009: NASCAR Camping World West Series; ARCA Re/Max Series
- Statistics up to date as of May 26, 2020.

Jesus Hernandez (born April 1, 1981) is an American professional stock car racing driver. He competed in what is now the ARCA Menards Series East full-time for three years from 2007 to 2009, while also making one start in both the West and ARCA Series during the course of his career. Being a Hispanic American, Hernandez was also a member of the Drive for Diversity program.

== Racing career ==
Hernandez made his NASCAR debut in the West Series at Phoenix International Raceway in 2007, driving the No. 4 Waste Management Chevy Monte Carlo SS. Hernandez finished fifth that race, his first and only start in that series. For the rest of the year, he full-time and for rookie of the year in the NASCAR Busch East Series with the same team, sponsor and car number. Allstate signed on as a sponsor for the team beginning in June of that year.

Hernandez was brought over to Dale Earnhardt, Inc., when Ginn merged with DEI in July 2007. His No. 4 team skipped the race at Adirondack International Speedway during the transition, and returned in time for the next race at Lime Rock Park. After this merger, Hernandez joined Jeffrey Earnhardt and Trevor Bayne as DEI's development drivers. If the merger had not happened, Hernandez was going to make his Truck Series debut in Morgan-Dollar Motorsports' No. 47 truck, sharing the ride with fellow Ginn development driver Kraig Kinser.

After DEI's merger with Chip Ganassi Racing to become Earnhardt Ganassi Racing, the team closed down their East Series team due to a lack of sponsorship, and Hernandez was released from his full-time ride after the season, but remained a development and test driver for the organization. He drove in the East Series for one more year in 2009, finishing 12th in points driving the Troy Williams Racing No. 12 Dodge for nearly the full season. He was replaced by Antonio Pérez for the races at Tri-County Motor Speedway and Watkins Glen. Pérez was also supposed to drive the car at Iowa (temporarily renumbered to the No. 28 due to it being a combination race with the West Series and Paulie Harraka using the No. 12), but was unable to race for unknown reasons, and Hernandez substituted for him in that race. Perez was supposed to drive the No. 12 in more races with Hernandez in a second car for TWR, but this did not happen.

Hernandez did not return to the Williams team and EGR in 2010 in order to seek a full-time ride in the ARCA or Truck Series.

== Motorsports career results ==
=== NASCAR ===
(key) (Bold – Pole position awarded by qualifying time. Italics – Pole position earned by points standings or practice time. * – Most laps led.)

==== Camping World East Series ====
NASCAR Camping World East Series results
| Year | Team | No. | Make | 1 | 2 | 3 | 4 | 5 | 6 | 7 | 8 | 9 | 10 | 11 | 12 | 13 | NCWEC | Pts | Ref |
|---|---|---|---|---|---|---|---|---|---|---|---|---|---|---|---|---|---|---|---|
| 2007 | Ginn Racing | 4 | Chevy | GRE; 11 | ELK; 6 | IOW; 2 | SBO; 31 | STA; 6 | NHA; 23 | TMP; 18 | NSH; 29 | ADI | | | | | 12th | 1495 | |
| 2007 | Dale Earnhardt, Inc. | 4 | Chevy | | | | | | | | | | LRP; 4 | MFD; 21 | NHA; 14 | DOV; 4 | 12th | 1495 | |
| 2008 | Dale Earnhardt, Inc. | 11 | Chevy | GRE; 17 | IOW; 5 | SBO; 15 | GLN; 4 | NHA; 12 | TMP; 2* | MCM; 7 | ADI; 7 | LRP; 4 | MFD; 4 | NHA; 19 | DOV; 17 | STA; 3 | 3rd | 1857 | |
| 2009 | Troy Williams Racing with Sean Watts | 12 | Dodge | GRE; 25 | TRI | | SBO; 16 | GLN | NHA; 8 | TMP; 7 | ADI; 4 | LRP; 6 | NHA; 5 | DOV; 13 | | | 12th | 1240 | |
| 2009 | Troy Williams Racing with Sean Watts | 28 | Dodge | | | IOW; 5 | | | | | | | | | | | 12th | 1240 | |

==== Camping World West Series ====
NASCAR West Series results
| Year | Team | No. | Make | 1 | 2 | 3 | 4 | 5 | 6 | 7 | 8 | 9 | 10 | 11 | 12 | 13 | NWSC | Pts | Ref |
|---|---|---|---|---|---|---|---|---|---|---|---|---|---|---|---|---|---|---|---|
| 2007 | Ginn Racing | 4 | Chevy | CTS | PHO; 5 | AMP | ELK | IOW | CNS | SON | DCS | IRW | MMP | EVG | CSR | AMP | 48th | 155 | |

=== ARCA Re/Max Series ===
(key) (Bold – Pole position awarded by qualifying time. Italics – Pole position earned by points standings or practice time. * – Most laps led.)

ARCA Re/Max Series results
| Year | Team | No. | Make | 1 | 2 | 3 | 4 | 5 | 6 | 7 | 8 | 9 | 10 | 11 | 12 | 13 | 14 | 15 | 16 | 17 | 18 | 19 | 20 | 21 | 22 | 23 | ARMC | Pts | Ref |
|---|---|---|---|---|---|---|---|---|---|---|---|---|---|---|---|---|---|---|---|---|---|---|---|---|---|---|---|---|---|
| 2007 | Ginn Racing | 36 | Chevy | DAY | USA | NSH | SLM | KAN | WIN | KEN; 6 | TOL | IOW | POC | MCH | BLN | KEN | POC | NSH | ISF | MIL | GTW | DSF | CHI | SLM | TAL | TOL | 109th | 200 | |
| 2009 | MTJ Motorsports | 56 | Chevy | DAY | SLM | CAR | TAL | KEN | TOL | POC | MCH | MFD | IOW | KEN; DNS | BLN | POC | ISF | CHI | TOL | DSF | NJE | SLM | KAN | CAR | | | 160th | 0 | |
