= Ryan Seaman (racing driver) =

American racing driver

- Nationality: (United States) American
- Born: November 6, 1982 (age 44) Toms River, New Jersey, U.S.

NASCAR Camping World East Series career
- Debut season: 2002
- Former teams: ERS Motorsports
- Wins: 0
- Poles: 0
- Best finish: 11th in 2005
- Finished last season: 63rd (2008)

Previous series
- 2008: ARCA Re/Max Series

NASCAR FedEx Freight Truck Series career
- 2 races run over 1 year
- Best finish: 106th (2008)
- First race: 2008 AAA Insurance 200 (Dover)
- Last race: 2008 Camping World RV Sales 200 (Milwaukee)
Wins	Top tens	Poles
0	0	0
- Statistics up to date as of July 8, 2020.

Ryan Seaman (born November 6, 1982) is an American professional stock car racing driver. He was a competitor in what is now the ARCA Menards Series East during the 2000s decade, driving all but one race in his 39 starts in that series for his family team, ERS Motorsports. Seaman also made two NASCAR Truck Series starts in 2008, three NASCAR Whelen Modified Tour starts between 2003 and 2005, and attempted to make an ARCA Re/Max Series start in 2008.

== Personal life ==
Seaman married his wife Melissa in November 2005. He and his family live in Toms River, New Jersey.

== Motorsports career results ==
=== NASCAR ===
(key) (Bold – Pole position awarded by qualifying time. Italics – Pole position earned by points standings or practice time. * – Most laps led.)

==== Craftsman Truck Series ====
NASCAR Craftsman Truck Series results
Year	Team	No.	Make	1	2	3	4	5	6	7	8	9	10	11	12	13	14	15	16	17	18	19	20	21	22	23	24	25	NCTC	Pts	Ref
2008	Lafferty Motorsports	89	Chevy	DAY	CAL	ATL	MAR	KAN	CLT	MFD	DOV; 33	TEX	MCH	MLW; 35	MEM	KEN	IRP	NSH	BRI	GTW	NHA	LVS	TAL	MAR	ATL	TEX	PHO	HOM	106th	64	

==== Camping World East Series ====
NASCAR Camping World East Series results
Year	Team	No.	Make	1	2	3	4	5	6	7	8	9	10	11	12	13	14	15	16	17	18	19	NCWESC	Pts	Ref
2002	ERS Motorsports	19	Chevy	LEE	NHA	NZH	SEE	BEE	STA	HOL	WFD	TMP	NHA	STA	GLN	ADI	THU	BEE	NHA	DOV	STA	LRP; DNQ	N/A	0	
2003	Info not available	1	Chevy	LEE	STA; 24	ERI	BEE																37th	374	
2003	ERS Motorsports	06	Chevy					STA; 22	HOL	TMP	NHA; 39	WFD	SEE	GLN	ADI	BEE	THU	NHA; 33	STA; 29	LRP			37th	374	
2004	ERS Motorsports	06	Chevy	LEE; 20	TMP; 15	LRP; 33	SEE; 16	STA; 19	HOL; 18	ERI; 12	WFD; 17	NHA; 16	ADI; 15	GLN; 17	NHA; 24	DOV; 10							16th	1424	
2005	ERS Motorsports	06	Chevy	STA; 20	HOL; 11	ERI; 11	NHA; 27	WFD; 12	ADI; 9	STA; 11	DUB; 12	OXF; 16	NHA; 9	DOV; 4	LRP; 14	TMP; 15							11th	1619	
2006	ERS Motorsports	06	Chevy	GRE	STA; 7	HOL	TMP	ERI	NHA; 24	ADI; 9	WFD	NHA; 6	DOV; 16	LRP									24th	640	
2007	ERS Motorsports	06	Chevy	GRE	ELK	IOW	SBO	STA	NHA; 35	TMP	NSH	ADI	LRP	MFD	NHA	DOV; 23							55th	152	
2008	ERS Motorsports	06	Chevy	GRE	IOW	SBO	GLN	NHA	TMP	NSH	ADI	LRP	MFD	NHA	DOV; 13	STA							63rd	124	

=== ARCA Re/Max Series ===
(key) (Bold – Pole position awarded by qualifying time. Italics – Pole position earned by points standings or practice time. * – Most laps led.)

ARCA Re/Max Series results
Year	Team	No.	Make	1	2	3	4	5	6	7	8	9	10	11	12	13	14	15	16	17	18	19	20	21	ARMC	Pts	Ref
2008	Mike Harmon Racing	24	Chevy	DAY	SLM	IOW	KAN	CAR	KEN	TOL	POC	MCH	CAY	KEN	BLN	POC	NSH	ISF	DSF	CHI	SLM	NJE; QL^{†}	TAL	TOL	N/A	0	
^{†} - Qualified for Mike Harmon
