= Bryon Chew =

American racing driver

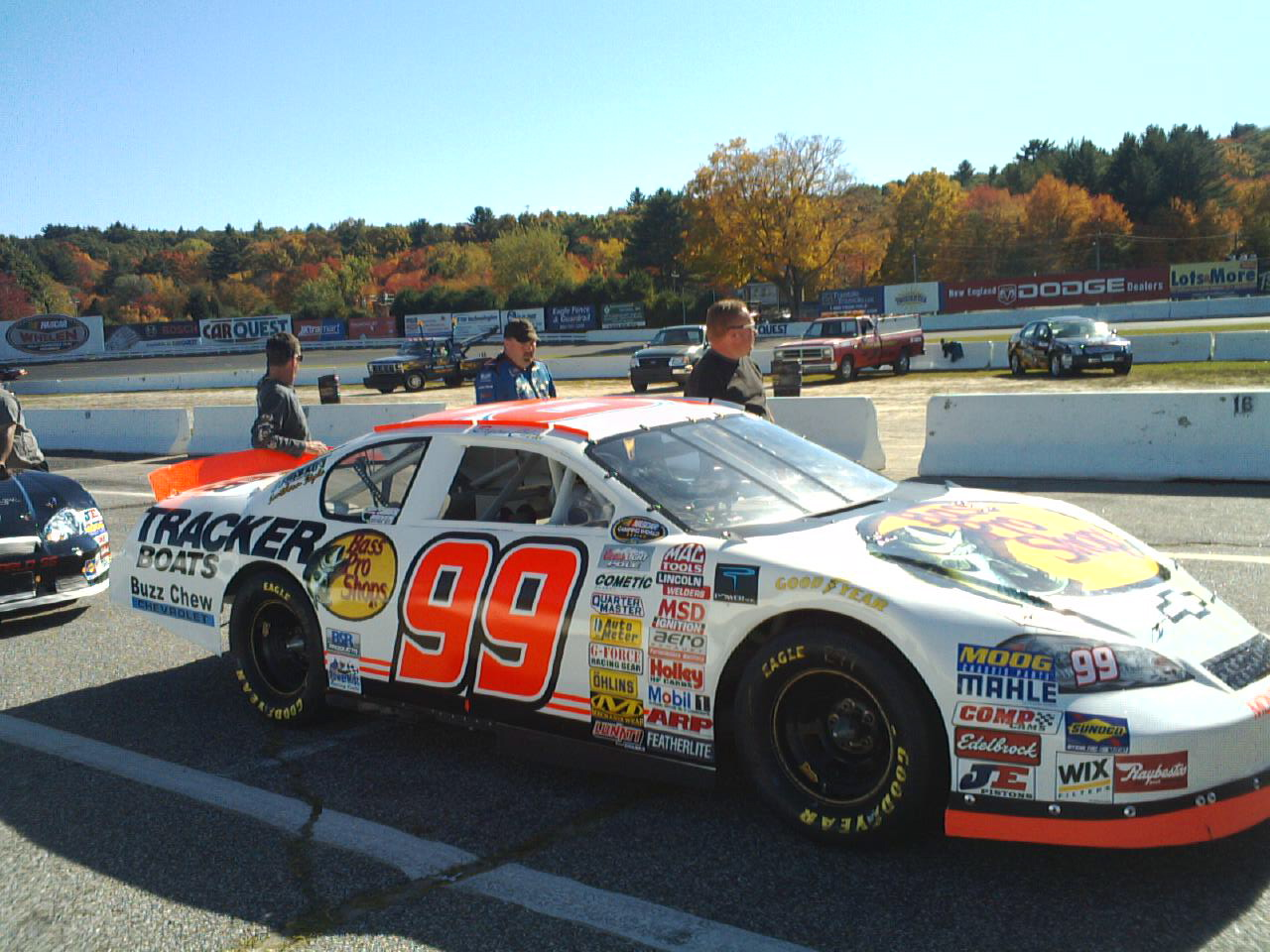
- Chew's No. 99 car at Stafford Motor Speedway in 2008
- Born: December 15, 1971 (age 54); Mattituck, New York, U.S.

ARCA Menards Series East career
- 129 races run over 10 years
- Best finish: 3rd (2006)
- First race: 1999 Busch 100 (New Hampshire)
- Last race: 2008 CarQuest Fall Final 150 (Stafford Springs)
- First win: 2006 Fuccillo Auto Park HUGE 150 (Holland)
Wins	Top tens	Poles
1	42	2
- Statistics up to date as of August 15, 2024.

Bryon Chew (born December 15, 1971) is an American former professional stock car racing driver who previously competed in the NASCAR Whelen Modified Tour, and NASCAR Camping World East Series.

Chew has also competed in the Modified Racing Series, the Race of Champions Asphalt Modified Tour and the PRO Truck Tour.

== Motorsports results ==
=== NASCAR ===
(key) (Bold – Pole position awarded by qualifying time. Italics – Pole position earned by points standings or practice time. * – Most laps led.)

==== Camping World East Series ====
NASCAR Camping World East Series results
Year	Team	No.	Make	1	2	3	4	5	6	7	8	9	10	11	12	13	14	15	16	17	18	19	20	NCWESC	Pts	Ref
1999	Buzz Chew	09	Chevy	LEE	RPS	NHA; 28	TMP	NZH	HOL	BEE	JEN	GLN	STA	NHA; 9	NZH	STA	NHA; 11	GLN; DNQ	EPP	THU	BEE	NHA; DNQ	LRP; 9	40th	510	
2000	Buzz Chew	09	Chevy	LEE; 25	NHA; 33	SEE; 20	HOL; DNQ	BEE; 13	JEN; 14	GLN	STA; 23	NHA; 16	NZH	STA; DNQ	WFD; 18	GLN; 10	EPP	TMP; 16	THU; 23	BEE; 25	NHA; 11	LRP		22nd	1504	
2001	Buzz Chew	09	Chevy	LEE; 26	NHA; 23	SEE; 24	HOL; 28	BEE; 22	EPP	STA; 12	WFD; 8	BEE	TMP; 30	NHA; 38	STA; 26	SEE; 18	GLN; 15	NZH	THU	BEE	DOV; 31	STA; 7	LRP; 15	24th	1483	
2002	Buzz Chew	09	Chevy	LEE; 30	NHA; 12	NZH; 21	SEE; 18	BEE; 20	STA; 4	HOL; 5	WFD; 17	TMP; 12	NHA; 8	STA; 15	GLN; 19	ADI; 20	THU; 12	BEE; 4	NHA; 12	DOV; 18	STA; 17	LRP; 2		12th	2340	
2003	Buzz Chew	09	Chevy	LEE; 14	STA; 13	ERI; 10	BEE; 13	STA; 15	HOL; 14	TMP; 31	NHA; 13	WFD; 3	SEE; 9	GLN; 14	ADI; 18	BEE; 16	THU; 13	NHA; 16	STA; 13	LRP; 13				12th	2071	
2004	Buzz Chew	99	Chevy	LEE; 25	TMP; 12	LRP; 8	SEE; 7	**STA**; 17	HOL; 13	ERI; 4	WFD; 6	NHA; 30	ADI; 21	GLN; 18	NHA; 13	DOV; 20								13th	1558	
2005	Buzz Chew	99	Chevy	STA; 13	HOL; 8	ERI; 13	NHA; 12	WFD; 2	ADI; 8	STA; 7	DUB; 21	OXF; 7	NHA; 15	DOV; 11	LRP; 7	TMP; 17								6th	1737	
2006	Buzz Chew	99	Chevy	GRE; 5	STA; 10	HOL; 1	TMP; 5	ERI; 9	NHA; 32	ADI; 2	WFD; 2	NHA; 3	DOV; 3	LRP; 8										3rd	1656	
2007	Buzz Chew	99	Chevy	GRE; 3	ELK; 2	IOW; 20	SBO; 13	STA; 5	NHA; 40	TMP; 8	NSH; 5	ADI; 26	LRP; 16	MFD; 9	NHA; 16	DOV; 25								11th	1603	
2008	Buzz Chew	99	Chevy	GRE; 29	IOW; 12	SBO; 11	GLN; 6	NHA; 23	TMP; 25	NSH	**ADI**; 11	LRP; 26	MFD	NHA; 9	DOV; 10	STA; 19								18th	1263	

==== Whelen Modified Tour ====
NASCAR Whelen Modified Tour results
Year	Car owner	No.	Make	1	2	3	4	5	6	7	8	9	10	11	12	13	14	15	16	NWMTC	Pts	Ref
2011	Buzz Chew	88	Chevy	TMP; 29	STA; 12	STA; 18	MND; 24	TMP; 27	NHA; 17	RIV; 25	STA; 12	NHA; 12	BRI; 20	DEL	TMP; 23	LRP; 21	NHA; 20	STA; 25	TMP; 30	19th	1500	
2012	Buzz Chew	88	Chevy	TMP; 19	STA; 10	MND; 17	STA; 19	WFD; 14	NHA; 14	STA; 24	TMP; 21	BRI; 9	TMP; 17	RIV	NHA; 22	STA; 8	TMP; 14			18th	364	
2013	Buzz Chew	88	Chevy	TMP; 25	STA; 22	STA; 12	WFD; 10	RIV; 9	NHA; 26	MND; 4	STA; 20	TMP; 26	BRI; 23	RIV; 21	NHA; 11	STA; 13	TMP; 27			17th	367	
