= Ryan Duff =

American racing driver

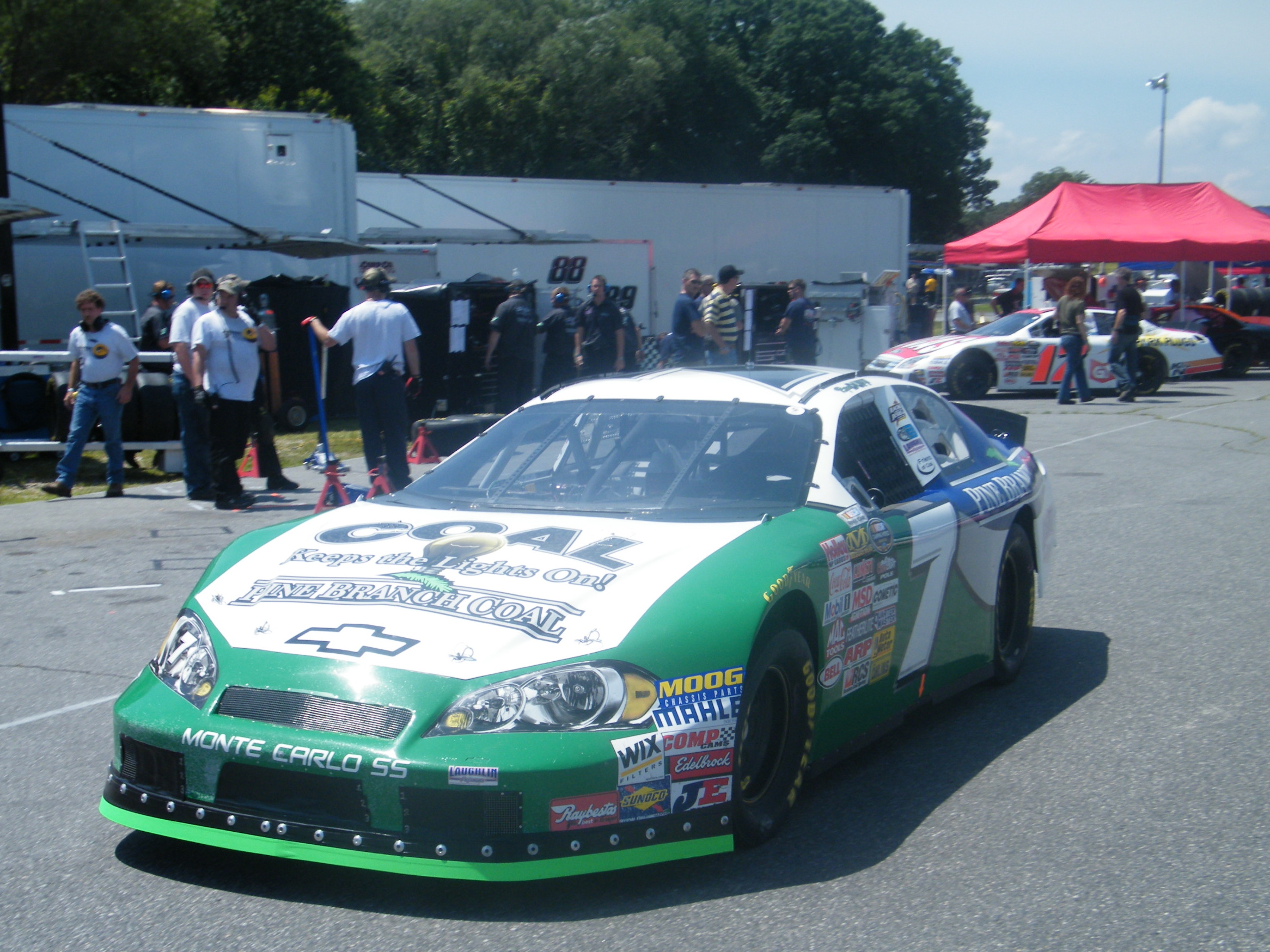
- Duff's No. 7 car at Thompson Speedway Motorsports Park in 2009
- Born: February 9, 1976 (age 50); Hazard, Kentucky, U.S.

ARCA Menards Series East career
- 29 races run over 3 years
- Best finish: 9th (2009)
- First race: 2008 An American Revolution 150 (Greensville-Pickens)
- Last race: 2010 NASCAR K&N Pro Series 125 (Lee)
| Wins | Top tens | Poles |
|---|---|---|
| 0 | 4 | 0 |
- Statistics up to date as of February 4, 2025.

Ryan Duff (born February 9, 1976) is an American former professional stock car racing driver who has competed in the NASCAR K&N Pro Series East from 2008 to 2010.

Duff has also previously competed in the Hooters Pro Cup Series.

== Motorsports results ==
=== NASCAR ===
(key) (Bold – Pole position awarded by qualifying time. Italics – Pole position earned by points standings or practice time. * – Most laps led.)

==== K&N Pro Series East ====
NASCAR K&N Pro Series East results
| Year | Team | No. | Make | 1 | 2 | 3 | 4 | 5 | 6 | 7 | 8 | 9 | 10 | 11 | 12 | 13 | NKNPSEC | Pts | Ref |
|---|---|---|---|---|---|---|---|---|---|---|---|---|---|---|---|---|---|---|---|
| 2008 | Laughlin Racing | 7 | Chevy | GRE; 25 | IOW; DNQ | SBO; 14 | GLN; 17 | NHA; 30 | TMP; 21 | NSH; 23 | ADI; 15 | LRP; 15 | MFD; 24 | NHA; 23 | DOV; 16 | STA | 20th | 1203 | |
| 2009 | Laughlin Racing | 7 | Chevy | GRE; 15 | TRI; 8 | IOW; 20 | SBO; 12 | GLN; 19 | NHA; 20 | TMP; 8 | ADI; 14 | LRP; 7 | NHA; 11 | DOV; 7 | | | 9th | 1384 | |
| 2010 | Laughlin Racing | 7 | Chevy | GRE; 21 | SBO; 16 | IOW; 24 | MAR; 19 | NHA; 18 | LRP; 15 | LEE; 24 | JFC | NHA | DOV | | | | 19th | 730 | |
