= Richard Johns (racing driver) =

American racing driver (born 1981)

- Born: October 23, 1981 (age 45); Lawrenceville, Georgia, U.S.

NASCAR O'Reilly Auto Parts Series career
- 15 races run over 1 year
- Best finish: 44th (2007)
- First race: 2007 Pepsi 300 (Nashville)
- Last race: 2007 Ford 300 (Homestead)
Wins	Top tens	Poles
0	0	0

NASCAR FedEx Freight Truck Series career
- 2 races run over 1 year
- Best finish: 97th (2008)
- First race: 2008 Mountain Dew 250 (Talladega)
- Last race: 2008 E-Z-GO 200 (Atlanta)
Wins	Top tens	Poles
0	0	0

Richard Johns (born October 23, 1981) is an American professional race car driver from Lawrenceville, Georgia. He is currently racing in the Georgia Asphalt Series and the Camping World East Series. Johns also works as an engineering consultant for several teams in NASCAR.

== Pre-NASCAR ==
Johns began racing in go-karts at the age of nine, Johns spent time on the go-kart dirt tracks throughout Georgia and the southeast. Moving up, he competed in the Professional Auto Truck Racing Series, the Georgia Asphalt Series and the ARCA RE/MAX Series. Along the way, Johns met Bobby Hamilton, who would be his mentor throughout his career.

== Entry into NASCAR ==
Johns attended the University of North Carolina at Charlotte while an employee at Team Rensi Motorsports. He graduated UNC-Charlotte with a Bachelor of Science in Mechanical Engineering. At the same time, he was promoted to Rensi's head engineer. In 2007, Rensi turned to Johns in driving their No. 25 car to fill in for NEXTEL Cup driver David Gilliland when his Cup and Busch schedule conflicted in 15 races, sponsored by freecreditreport.com. Johns had two top-20 finishes and ended the season with a 44th-place finish in points. Losing not only both sponsors but Gilliland as well, who had mutually left due to the struggles of Yates Racing, Team Rensi downsized to a one team operation. During the offseason, Johns left Team Rensi and signed a sponsorship deal with family internet portal havfun.com. He and havfun were to compete in the Craftsman Truck Series for Wyler Racing in 2008, but the sponsor money never materialized and the deal fell through before Speedweeks, leaving Johns without a ride.

== Motorsports career results ==
=== NASCAR ===
(key) (Bold – Pole position awarded by qualifying time. Italics – Pole position earned by points standings or practice time. * – Most laps led.)

==== Busch Series ====
NASCAR Busch Series results
Year	Team	No.	Make	1	2	3	4	5	6	7	8	9	10	11	12	13	14	15	16	17	18	19	20	21	22	23	24	25	26	27	28	29	30	31	32	33	34	35	NBSC	Pts	Ref
2007	Team Rensi Motorsports	25	Ford	DAY	CAL	MXC	LVS	ATL	BRI	NSH; 34	TEX	PHO	TAL	RCH	DAR	CLT	DOV	NSH; 34	KEN; 28	MLW; 19	NHA	DAY	CHI	GTY; 31	IRP; 15	CGV; 25	GLN	MCH	BRI	CAL	RCH; 30	DOV; 28	KAN; 26	CLT; 27	MEM; 23	TEX; 34	PHO; 31	HOM; 35	44th	1185	

==== Craftsman truck Series ====
NASCAR Craftsman Truck Series results
Year	Team	No.	Make	1	2	3	4	5	6	7	8	9	10	11	12	13	14	15	16	17	18	19	20	21	22	23	24	25	NCTC	Pts	Ref
2008	Lafferty Motorsports	89	Chevy	DAY	CAL	ATL	MAR	KAN	CLT	MFD	DOV	TEX	MCH	MLW	MEM	KEN	IRP	NSH	BRI	GTW	NHA	LVS	TAL; 31	MAR	ATL; 30	TEX	PHO	HOM	70th	152	

=== ARCA Re/Max Series ===
(key) (Bold – Pole position awarded by qualifying time. Italics – Pole position earned by points standings or practice time. * – Most laps led.)

ARCA Re/Max Series results
Year	Team	No.	Make	1	2	3	4	5	6	7	8	9	10	11	12	13	14	15	16	17	18	19	20	21	22	23	ARSC	Pts	Ref
2006	Roulo Brothers Racing	39	Ford	DAY	NSH	SLM	WIN	KEN	TOL	POC	MCH	KAN; 7	KEN; 29	BLN	POC	GTW	NSH	MCH	ISF	MIL	TOL	DSF	CHI	SLM	TAL	IOW	90th	285	
2007	Roulo Brothers Racing	39	Ford	DAY	USA	NSH; 16	SLM	KAN	WIN	KEN; 14	TOL	IOW	POC	MCH	BLN	KEN	POC	NSH	ISF	MIL	GTW	DSF	CHI	SLM	TAL; 4	TOL	54th	525	
