= Jody Lavender =

American racing driver

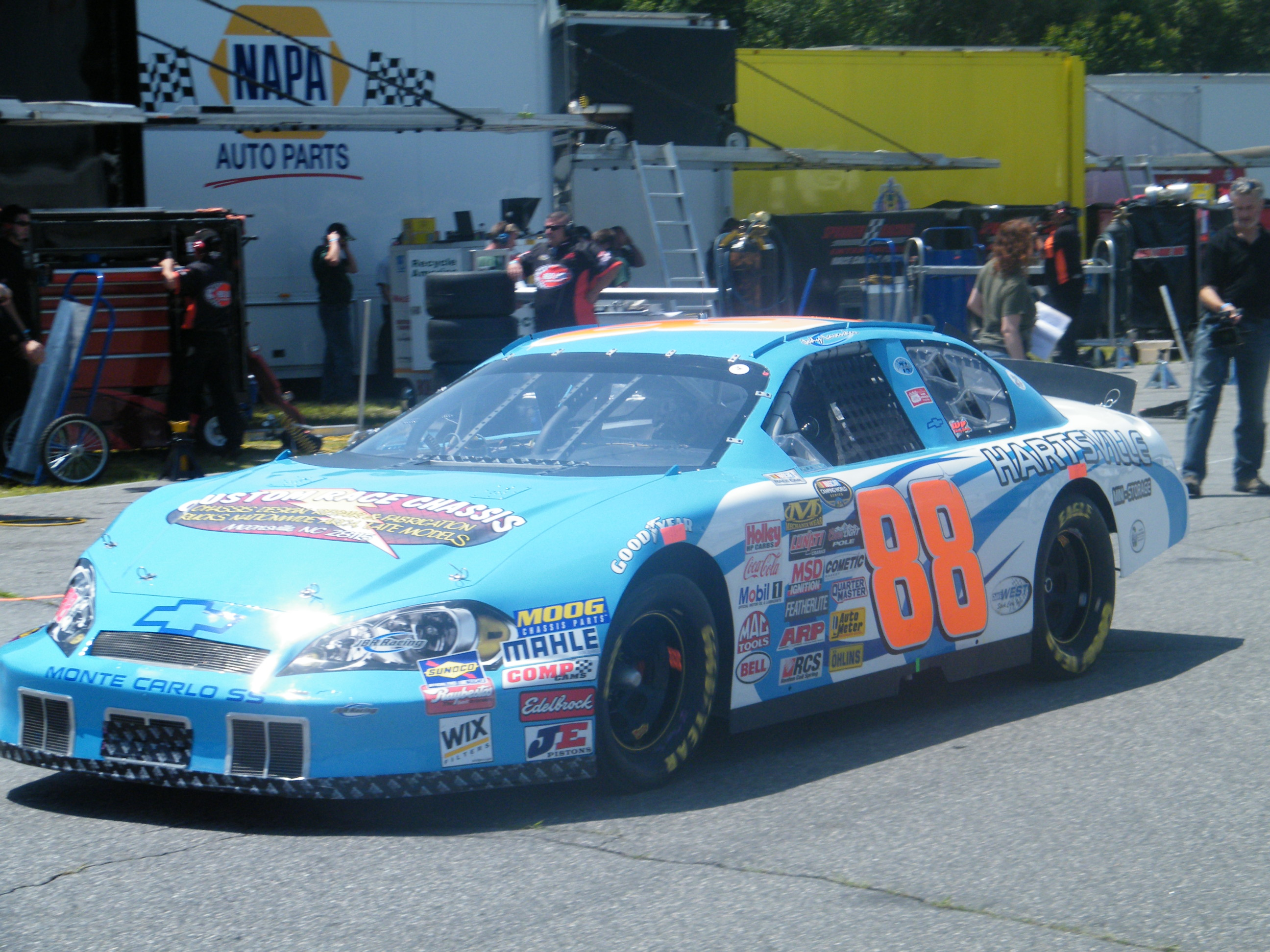
- Lavender's No. 88 car at Thompson Speedway Motorsports Park in 2009
- Born: December 29, 1979 (age 46); Hartsville, South Carolina, U.S.

NASCAR O'Reilly Auto Parts Series career
- 1 race run over 1 year
- Best finish: 124th (2003)
- First race: 2003 Rockingham 200 (Rockingham)
Wins	Top tens	Poles
0	0	0

NASCAR FedEx Freight Truck Series career
- 22 races run over 2 years
- Best finish: 17th (2003)
- First race: 2002 Virginia Is For Lovers 200 (Richmond)
- Last race: 2003 Ford 200 (Homestead)
Wins	Top tens	Poles
0	0	0
- Statistics up to date as of July 31, 2013.

Jody Lavender (born December 29, 1979) is an American stock car racing driver. He formerly competed in the NASCAR Camping World East Series. He was born in Hartsville, South Carolina.

== Racing history ==
Lavender only competed in one Busch Series race, in a family-owned No. 08 Ford. He started 34th in 2003 at Darlington, and finished 23rd, two laps down.

Lavender made his debut in the Craftsman Truck Series in a one-race deal in 2002, driving for Troxell Racing. Starting last at Richmond, he managed to improve to 33rd in the race after a rear end gear let go.

Lavender was picked up by Green Light Racing, and ran 21 of the 25 races in 2003. However, he never cracked the top-ten. He finished all but five of his starts. In those sixteen starts that he was running at the end, he finished in the top-20 eleven times. The highlight of the season was a pair of 13th-place finishes at Dover and Memphis. His worst finish of the year was 27th (out of 36 starters per race). Lavender also led one lap of competition at Kentucky, giving him bonus points toward the 17th-place finish he got in points.

Green Light did not pick him up for 2004, and Lavender was not able to find a ride. Lavender drove the number 88 Chevrolet for JBR in the NASCAR Camping World East Series during the 2009 and 2010 seasons.

== Motorsports career results ==
=== NASCAR ===
(key) (Bold – Pole position awarded by qualifying time. Italics – Pole position earned by points standings or practice time. * – Most laps led.)

==== Busch Series ====
NASCAR Busch Series results
Year	Team	No.	Make	1	2	3	4	5	6	7	8	9	10	11	12	13	14	15	16	17	18	19	20	21	22	23	24	25	26	27	28	29	30	31	32	33	34	NBSC	Pts	Ref
2002	Weber Racing	84	Chevy	DAY	CAR	LVS	DAR	BRI	TEX	NSH	TAL	CAL	RCH	NHA	NZH	CLT	DOV	NSH	KEN	MLW	DAY	CHI	GTY	PPR	IRP	MCH	BRI	DAR	RCH	DOV	KAN	CLT	MEM; DNQ	ATL				NA	-	
2002	Lavender Racing	08	Chevy																																CAR; DNQ	PHO	HOM	NA	-	
2003	Lavender Racing	08	Ford	DAY	CAR; 23	LVS	DAR	BRI	TEX	TAL	NSH	CAL	RCH	GTY	NZH	CLT	DOV	NSH	KEN	MLW	DAY	CHI	NHA	PPR	IRP	MCH	BRI	DAR	RCH	DOV	KAN	CLT	MEM	ATL	PHO	CAR	HOM	124th	94	

==== Craftsman Truck Series ====
NASCAR Craftsman Truck Series results
Year	Team	No.	Make	1	2	3	4	5	6	7	8	9	10	11	12	13	14	15	16	17	18	19	20	21	22	23	24	25	NCTC	Pts	Ref
2002	Troxell Racing	93	Chevy	DAY	DAR	MAR	GTY	PPR	DOV	TEX	MEM	MLW	KAN	KEN	NHA	MCH	IRP	NSH	RCH; 33	TEX	SBO	LVS	CAL	PHO	HOM				99th	64	
2003	Green Light Racing	08	Chevy	DAY	DAR; 25	MMR; 27	MAR; 23	CLT; 18	DOV; 13	TEX; 15	MEM; 13	MLW; 24	KAN; 20	KEN; 24	GTW; 16	MCH; 23	IRP; 21	NSH; 18	BRI; 22	RCH; 19	NHA	CAL	LVS	SBO; 19	TEX; 16	MAR; 26	PHO; 22	HOM; 16	17th	2168	

=== CARS Super Late Model Tour ===
(key)

CARS Super Late Model Tour results
Year	Team	No.	Make	1	2	3	4	5	6	7	8	9	10	CSLMTC	Pts	Ref
2016	Mickelson Motorsports	7K	N/A	SNM	ROU	HCY	TCM	GRE; 13	ROU	CON	MYB; 12	HCY	SNM	36th	41	
