= Mansfield Speedway =

Motorsport venue in the United States

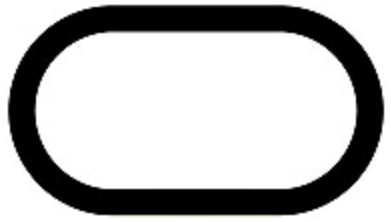
- Oval (1959–2019)
- Location: Mansfield, Ohio
- Coordinates: 40°48′42″N 82°29′49″W
- Capacity: 10,000
- Owner: Matt Tifft
- Address: 100 Crall Road, Mansfield, Ohio 44903
- Opened: 1959; Re-opened: 2026
- Closed: 2019
- Former names: Mansfield Motor Speedway (2017–2019); Mansfield Motorsports Park (2008–2016); Mansfield Motorsports Speedway (1959–2007)
- Major events: Former: NASCAR Craftsman Truck Series Ohio 250 (2004–2008); ARCA RE/MAX Series (2009–2010); NASCAR K&N Pro Series East (2007–2008); NASCAR Whelen Modified Tour (2007–2008); USAR Hooters Pro Cup Series (2003–2008); NASCAR Midwest Series (2004–2005); ASA Late Model Series (2003–2004)

Oval (1959–2019, 2026)
- Surface: Dirt
- Length: 0.437 mi (0.704 km)
- Banking: Turns - 16° Front straight - 8°

Previous oval
- Surface: Asphalt
- Length: 0.437 mi (0.704 km)

Mansfield Speedway (formerly Mansfield Motorsports Park, Mansfield Motorsports Speedway, and Mansfield Motor Speedway) is a 0.440 mi (0.708 km) dirt track located in Mansfield, Ohio, United States. It opened in 1959 and hosted dirt and pavement racing, the latter including NASCAR and the Automobile Racing Club of America.

The track eventually fell into disrepair. Former driver Matt Tifft purchased the facility in 2025, and it reopened in 2026.

== History ==
With its moderately high banking and a wide racing surface, it was suitable for close racing and passing. The track hosted an ARCA RE/MAX Series race in 2009–2010, and it also hosted the NASCAR Craftsman Truck Series from 2004 to 2008. Mansfield Motorsports Park closed in 2010.

On January 18, 2013, Grant Milliron of Milliron Industries, a local facility specializing in waste, recycling and scrap metal, purchased the former Mansfield Motorsports Park for $800,000 in an auction held by the Richland County Sheriff's office following the property's seizure by the county in lieu of unpaid property taxes.

For 2017, it was announced that the track would undergo a transition from asphalt to dirt. The track had previously been dirt until 1999. The track name was also changed from "Spitzer Motor Speedway" to "Mansfield Motor Speedway" for 2017.

With the new dirt surface, Mansfield Motor Speedway hosted series like the Lucas Oil Late Model Dirt Series and the Arctic Cat All Star Circuit of Champions. Due to scheduling changes, the Lucas Oil Late Model Dirt Series event originally scheduled for July 3 at Atomic Speedway was relocated to Mansfield Speedway as a 50-lap, $25,000-to-win feature program.

The track closed following the 2019 Dirt Million event. Demolition of the grandstands began in late 2020 as portions were donated to a local high school. The track walls were torn down in 2022 and portions of the fencing and SAFER barriers were sold to the Nelson Ledges Race Course.

On June 1, 2025, former NASCAR driver and teamowner Matt Tifft announced he had purchased the facility with plans to rebuild the track. Tifft installed a new dirt surface along with an upgraded video screen and restored grandstands. The track reopened in 2026.

== Former events ==
Mansfield formerly hosted a wide variety of events, most notably the NASCAR Craftsman Truck Series), which raced at Mansfield on Memorial Day weekend beginning in 2004. Mansfield was the shortest track on the Craftsman Truck Series schedule and was the only track in the United States to be on the Craftsman Truck Series schedule as well as being Dodge Weekly Series sanctioned. This ended in 2007 when the weekly race program at the track was discontinued.

In addition, Mansfield hosted two annual rounds of the USAR Hooters Pro Cup Series as well as the NASCAR Camping World East Series and NASCAR Whelen Modified Tour, the ASA Late Model Series, ISMA and MSA supermodifieds and HOSS sprint cars.

The facility received a safety upgrade in 2006 when SAFER barriers were installed in the turns.

During early 2009, Music City Motorplex authorities announced a new promoter for the Nashville 0.596-mile (0.959 km) speedway, who chose to remove all "upper level" touring series races (NASCAR and ARCA) and decided not to renew its NASCAR sanction. Track officials were contacted by former Nashville promoter Joseph Mattioli III about having their major touring series races moved to Mansfield. In February 2009, the track replaced Nashville on the ARCA RE/MAX Series tour, with the Tim Richmond Memorial ARCA Re/Max 200 scheduled to be held on June 20, 2009.

== Drag strip ==
A drag strip had been planned for the facility since 2006, following the decision by Summit Motorsports Park (located roughly 35-mile (56 km) north in Norwalk) to discontinue their affiliation with the IHRA and join the NHRA. It was intended to have Mansfield replace Norwalk as the venue for the IHRA World Nationals by 2007 and to host a Live Nation IHRA eMax Nitro Jam event as part of the drag strip's opening festivities. The drag strip was never completed after construction was delayed and once started almost immediately halted.

== Former NASCAR races ==
- NASCAR Craftsman Truck Series Ohio 250 (2004–2008)

== Track NASCAR records ==
- NASCAR Craftsman Truck Series qualifying: Ron Hornaday Jr., 16.277 sec. (110.585 mph), 2005
- NASCAR Craftsman Truck Series race: Bobby Hamilton, 1 hr, 55 min, 37 sec (65.907 mph), 2005
- NASCAR Craftsman Truck Series race record for most caution flags: 18 (2006)
