= Adirondack International Speedway =

Motorsport venue in New Bremen, New York, US

- Location: New Bremen, New York
- Coordinates: 43.8536°N 75.4519°W
- Owner: Paul Lyndacker
- Broke ground: 1996
- Opened: 2001
- Former names: Adirondack Motorsports Park
- Website: aismotorsports.com

Oval
- Surface: Asphalt
- Length: .8 km (0.50 mi)
- Turns: 4
- Banking: 10 to 15 degrees

Inner Oval
- Surface: Asphalt
- Length: .4 km (0.25 mi)
- Turns: 4

Adirondack International Speedway (AIS) includes a half-mile and a quarter-mile asphalt oval raceways located in the foothills of the Adirondack Mountains and the Northern Region of New York State. The facility also contains a mud-park.

== Overview ==
In 1995 and 1996, Paul Lyndacker purchased adjoining parcels of land in Lewis County, New York and began construction of a racing facility. In late 1997 he marked out a one-mile dirt road course and hosted the Central New York Ice Racing Association. However, it was not until August 24, 2001, that New York Governor George Pataki presided over the official opening of the ovals, featuring the American Canadian Tour along with the Street Stock and 4 Cylinder classes.

The following year, the facility began offering a regular schedule of Late Models, Legends, and Street Stocks, with occasional appearances by Supermodifieds and Modifieds. Also, beginning in 2002 and continuing through 2009 the NASCAR Busch Grand National North tour (now known as the ARCA Menards Series East) appeared annually at AIS.

Litigation with government officials over tax assessments and access to state grants began in 2010 and caused operations to go on hiatus for several years. AIS eventually revived regular auto racing events, with Leslie Keefer and later Frank Nortz taking on the general manager role.

== Events ==
In recent years, traditional oval track racing has been less prevalent at AIS. Instead, the facility focuses on mud racing, demolition derbies, drifting, and enduros.
