= 2017 Northeastern Midget Association =

The 2017 Northeastern Midget Association is the 65th season of the Northeastern Midget Association. The series began at Thompson Speedway Motorsports Park on April 1, and ends with the 55th World Series of Speedway Racing at Thompson Speedway Motorsports Park on October 14. John Zych Jr. is the defending champion.

Date	Track	Title	Location	Winner	Car #	M/L
April 1	Thompson Speedway Motorsports Park	43rd Annual Icebreaker	Thompson, Connecticut	Todd Bertrand	48	Light
May 13	Star Speedway		Epping, New Hampshire	Avery Stoehr; Dan CuginI	39; 51	Midget; Light
May 20	Wiscasset Speedway	Ames True Value NEMA Nights	Wiscasset, Maine			Midget; Light
June 3	Riverhead Raceway	Allan Cantor Memorial	Riverhead, New York			Midget; Light
June 14	Thompson Speedway Motorsports Park		Thompson, Connecticut			Light
June 17	Star Speedway	Butch Walsh Memorial	Epping, New Hampshire			Midget; Light
June 28	Seekonk Speedway	Boston Louie Memorial	Seekonk, Massachusetts			Midget; Light
July 8	Star Speedway	Marvin Rifchin Trophy Race	Epping, New Hampshire			Midget; Light
July 15	Seekonk Speedway		Seekonk, Massachusetts			Light
July 29	Speedway 51		Groveton, New Hampshire			Light
August 9	Thompson Speedway Motorsports Park		Thompson, Connecticut			Midget
August 12	Waterford Speedbowl	Wings & Wheels; The Angelillo Memorial	Waterford, Connecticut			Midget; Light
August 19	Star Speedway	Marvin Rifchin Memorial	Epping, New Hampshire			Midget; Light
August 26	Waterford Speedbowl		Waterford, Connecticut			Light
September 2	Monadnock Speedway	Iron Mike Scrivani Memorial Race	Winchester, New Hampshire			Midget; Light
September 9	Waterford Speedbowl		Waterford, Connecticut			Light
September 23	Wiscasset Speedway		Wiscasset, Maine			Light
September 30	Star Speedway	Jim O'Brien Memorial	Epping, New Hampshire			Midget; Light
October 14–15	Thompson Speedway Motorsports Park	55th Annual Sunoco World Series of Speedway Racing	Thompson, Connecticut			Midget; Light
