= Shore Lunch 250 =

ARCA Menards Series races at Elko Speedway

ARCA Menards Series at Elko
ARCA Menards Series
- Venue: Elko Speedway
- Location: Elko New Market, Minnesota, United States

Circuit information
- Surface: Paved
- Length: .375 mi (0.604 km)
- Turns: 4

Stock car racing events in the ARCA Menards Series have been held at Elko Speedway, in Elko New Market, Minnesota during numerous seasons and times of year since 2012.

== Current race ==
Shore Lunch 250
ARCA Menards Series
- Venue: Elko Speedway
- Location: Elko New Market, Minnesota
- Corporate sponsor: Shore Lunch (title sponsor); Dutch Boy (presenting sponsor)
- First race: 2012
- Distance: 93.750 mi (150.876 km)
- Laps: 250
- Previous names: Akona 200 presented by Federated Car Care (2012); Akona 250 Presented by Federated Car Care (2013–2014); Shore Lunch 250 (2017); Sioux Chief PowerPEX 250 (2018); Menards 250 Presented by MatrixCare (2019); Menards 250 (2021–2023)
- Most wins (driver): Max Reaves (2)
- Most wins (team): Venturini Motorsports (4)
- Most wins (manufacturer): Toyota (9)

Circuit information
- Length: .375 mi (0.604 km)
- Turns: 4

The Shore Lunch 250 presented by Dutch Boy Paints is a 93.750-mile (150.876 km), 250-lap annual ARCA Menards Series race held at Elko Speedway in Elko New Market, Minnesota. Max Reaves is the defending race winner.

=== History ===
ARCA debuted at the track in 2012, running at the track for three consecutive years. After 2014, the race was taken off the calendar for the next two seasons, before being added back for the 2017 season, where it has remained since.

In 2020, the race was cancelled and moved to Toledo due to the COVID-19 pandemic. With this race off the schedule, Menards also moved their title sponsorship to the new Toledo race.

In 2024, the race would be held in August for the first time and Shore Lunch, previously the title sponsor of the race in 2017, returned as title sponsor, replacing Menards. In 2025, the race was held back in June.

=== Past winners ===
Year	Date	No.	Driver	Team	Manufacturer	Race Distance		Race Time	Average Speed (mph)	Report	Ref
Year	Date	No.	Driver	Team	Manufacturer	Laps	Miles (km)	Race Time	Average Speed (mph)	Report	Ref
2012	June 2	25	Brennan Poole	Venturini Motorsports	Chevrolet	200	75 (120.701)	1:00:44	74.090	Report	
2013	June 1	44	Frank Kimmel	ThorSport Racing	Toyota	250	93.750 (150.876)	1:17:00	73.051	Report	
2014	June 21	90	Grant Enfinger	Team BCR Racing	Ford	250	93.750 (150.876)	1:16:51	73.200	Report	
2015 – 2016	Not held										
2017	June 3	52	Austin Theriault	Ken Schrader Racing	Toyota (2)	250	93.750 (150.876)	1:28:51	63.311	Report	
2018	July 14	32	Gus Dean	Win-Tron Racing	Chevrolet (2)	250	93.750 (150.876)	1:29:54	62.570	Report	
2019	July 13	20	Chandler Smith	Venturini Motorsports (2)	Toyota (3)	250	93.750 (150.876)	1:30:25	62.212	Report	
2020	July 11	Cancelled due to the COVID-19 pandemic									
2021	July 10	20	Corey Heim	Venturini Motorsports (3)	Toyota (4)	250	93.750 (150.876)	1:20:07	69.274	Report	
2022	June 25	18	Sammy Smith	Kyle Busch Motorsports	Toyota (5)	250	93.750 (150.876)	1:19:07	71.098	Report	
2023	June 24	20	Jesse Love	Venturini Motorsports (4)	Toyota (6)	250	93.750 (150.876)	1:34:19	59.64	Report	
2024	August 3	18	William Sawalich	Joe Gibbs Racing	Toyota (7)	250	93.750 (150.876)	1:25:54	65.483	Report	
2025	June 21	18	Max Reaves	Joe Gibbs Racing (2)	Toyota (8)	250	93.750 (150.876)	1:27:3	64.261	Report	
2026	June 27	18	Max Reaves (2)	Joe Gibbs Racing (3)	Toyota (9)	250	93.750 (150.876)	1:25:1	65.995	Report	

==== Multiple winners (teams) ====
# Wins	Team	Years won
4	Venturini Motorsports	2012, 2019, 2021, 2023
3	Joe Gibbs Racing	2024–2026

==== Manufacturer wins ====
# Wins	Manufacturer	Years won
9	Toyota	2013, 2017, 2019, 2021–2026
2	Chevrolet	2012, 2018
1	Ford	2014

== Former race ==
Minnesota 150
ARCA Menards Series East ARCA Menards Series West
- Venue: Elko Speedway
- Location: Elko New Market, Minnesota, United States
- First race: 2007
- Last race: 2007
- Distance: 56.2 (105.733 km)
- Laps: 150
- Previous names: Minnesota 150 (2007)
- Most wins (driver): Sean Caisse (1)
- Most wins (team): Andy Santerre Racing (1)
- Most wins (manufacturer): Chevrolet (1)

Circuit information
- Surface: Paved
- Length: .375 mi (0.604 km)
- Turns: 4

The Minnesota 150 was a combination onetime ARCA Menards Series East and ARCA Menards Series West event held at Elko Speedway. Sean Caisse was the lone winner of the event.

=== History ===
In 2007, the NASCAR K&N Pro Series East and the NASCAR K&N Pro Series West held a lone combination race. Sean Caisse was the only winner of the event, scoring the overall win, while third place Mike David was awarded the race win for the West Series.

=== Past winners ===
Year	Date	No.	Driver	Team	Manufacturer	Race distance		Race time	Average speed (mph)	Report	Ref
Year	Date	No.	Driver	Team	Manufacturer	Laps	Miles (km)	Race time	Average speed (mph)	Report	Ref
2007	May 18	44	Sean Caisse	Andy Santerre Racing	Chevrolet	150	56.2 (90.526)	1:11:26	49.137	Report	

Previous race: Herr's Snacks 200	ARCA Menards Series; Shore Lunch 250	Next race: ARCA 100
