= Sean Caisse =

American racing driver (born 1986)

- Born: Sean James Caisse; January 30, 1986 (age 40); Pelham, New Hampshire, U.S.

NASCAR O'Reilly Auto Parts Series career
- 8 races run over 3 years
- Best finish: 76th (2010)
- First race: 2006 Dover 200 (Dover)
- Last race: 2010 5-hour Energy 250 (Gateway)
Wins	Top tens	Poles
0	0	0

NASCAR FedEx Freight Truck Series career
- 1 race run over 1 year
- Best finish: 113th (2008)
- First race: 2008 Kroger 200 (Martinsville)
Wins	Top tens	Poles
0	0	0
- Statistics up to date as of November 20, 2015.

Sean James Caisse (born January 30, 1986) is an American former stock car racing driver.

== Career ==
Caisse rose through the ranks of karting to full-size stock cars at Lee USA Speedway in Lee, New Hampshire. He progressed from Hobby Stocks to Late Models and beyond while still a teenager. In 2002 Caisse finished second in the Hobby Stock category at the local speedway. For 2003, Caisse joined the Northeastern Midget Association. Caisse's best results were two second-place finishes at Oswego Speedway and Star Speedway. He finished seventh in the season standings.

Caisse then joined the NASCAR Featherlite Modified Series in 2004. With owner Art Barry, he won a pole and also drove in the NASCAR Busch North Series. After leaving Barry's operation, he made his NASCAR Grand National Division, Busch North Series debut at New Hampshire International Speedway. 2005 saw Caisse make a run at Rookie of the Year in Busch North driving for Barney McRae. He won two poles and finishing in the top five twice as well on his way to finishing seventh in series points. In 2006, Caisse drove for a new team, Andy Santerre Motorsports and sponsored by Casella Waste Systems. The combination won the first time out at Greenville-Pickens Speedway, and totaled three times in eleven races, finishing, the season with six top-fives and eight top-tens, and second in points to Mike Olsen.

Caisse also made his NASCAR Busch Series debut during 2006, racing at Dover International Speedway for Kevin Harvick, Inc. He plans to participate in more races for the NASCAR Busch Series in 2007. He is set to make his Craftsman Truck Series debut with Germain Racing in their Research & development No. 03 Toyota, sponsored by Casella.

Caisse went on in the Busch East series to win four races total as well as the final race at Dover Speedway, He finished second in the NASCAR Busch East Series Championship. He went to Irwindale, California for the Toyota All Star Showdown in November to earn the pole and lead the first 74 laps before being spun by a lapped car, ending his night early. The following year, Caisse again competed in the NASCAR Busch East Series. Caisse won four races earning him the second place in the championship again.

In 2008, Caisse moved to Mooresville, North Carolina. Due to the economic crisis Caisse was left without a sponsor. He also became a frequent competitor in the NASCAR Busch Series, later the NASCAR Nationwide Series. After his debut race in 2006, crashing at Dover International Speedway, Caisse joined Richard Childress Racing for two races in 2009. A 22nd place at New Hampshire International Speedway was his best result. In 2009 Caisse won one ARCA RE/MAX race, at Rockingham Speedway. Caisse ran five Nationwide Series races in 2010. His best finish was 18th at Nashville Superspeedway.

Caisse ran his last professional auto race in 2012. Racing a MacDonald Motorsports Dodge Caisse finished seventeenth in a NASCAR K&N Pro Series East race at Bowman Gray Stadium.

== Personal life ==
In 2008, Caisse had a relationship with model Whitney Kay. In 2010 the two had a daughter, Brielle. In May 2010 Caisse and Kay got married. The two filed for divorce in October 2011. Kay later remarried in January 2014 with her current husband, former NASCAR driver, Brian Scott.

=== Assault charges ===
In 2013, Caisse made a sexual assault complaint against Andy Cusack, owner of Beech Ridge Motor Speedway. During the following 13 months, Caisse threatened Cusack to file more sexual assault charges. In late 2014 Cusack and Caisse met in person. Cusack offered Caisse a petition to sign that stated the sexual assault charges were false. Caisse did not sign the petition and left the meeting for time to think about the statement. The following night Caisse returned to Cusack's home in Scarborough, Maine. After Cusack stepped outside Caisse started to beat him. In February 2015, Caisse was extradited to Maine where he awaited trial. During the proceedings, Cusack claimed that an unnamed citizen of Gorham, Maine, who had also filed a legal action against Cusack in 2017 on similar grounds, colluded with Caisse in an attempt to blackmail him.

== Motorsports career results ==
=== NASCAR ===
(key) (Bold – Pole position awarded by qualifying time. Italics – Pole position earned by points standings or practice time. * – Most laps led.)

==== Nationwide Series ====
NASCAR Nationwide Series results
Year	Team	No.	Make	1	2	3	4	5	6	7	8	9	10	11	12	13	14	15	16	17	18	19	20	21	22	23	24	25	26	27	28	29	30	31	32	33	34	35	NNSC	Pts	Ref
2006	Kevin Harvick Incorporated	33	Chevy	DAY	CAL	MXC	LVS	ATL	BRI	TEX	NSH	PHO	TAL	RCH	DAR	CLT	DOV	NSH	KEN	MLW	DAY	CHI	NHA	MAR	GTY	IRP	GLN	MCH	BRI	CAL	RCH	DOV; 42	KAN	CLT	MEM	TEX	PHO	HOM	146th	37	
2009	Richard Childress Racing	2	Chevy	DAY	CAL	LVS	BRI	TEX	NSH	PHO	TAL	RCH	DAR	CLT	DOV	NSH; 29	KEN	MLW	NHA; 22	DAY	CHI	GTY	IRP	IOW	GLN	MCH	BRI	CGV	ATL	RCH	DOV	KAN	CAL	CLT	MEM	TEX	PHO	HOM	131st	97	
2010	RAB Racing	09	Ford	DAY	CAL	LVS	BRI	NSH	PHO	TEX	TAL	RCH	DAR	DOV	CLT	NSH; 18	KEN; 27	ROA	NHA; 21	DAY	CHI	GTY	IRP	IOW	GLN	MCH													76th	416	
2010	Go Green Racing	39	Ford																								BRI; 34	CGV	ATL	RCH	DOV	KAN	CAL	CLT	GTY; 33	TEX	PHO	HOM; DNQ	76th	416	

==== Craftsman Truck Series ====
NASCAR Craftsman Truck Series results
Year	Team	No.	Make	1	2	3	4	5	6	7	8	9	10	11	12	13	14	15	16	17	18	19	20	21	22	23	24	25	NCTC	Pts	Ref
2007	Germain Racing	03	Toyota	DAY	CAL	ATL	MAR	KAN	CLT	MFD	DOV	TEX	MCH	MLW	MEM	KEN	IRP	NSH	BRI	GTW	NHA; DNQ	LVS	TAL	MAR	ATL	TEX	PHO	HOM	NA	-	
2008	Germain Racing	9	Toyota	DAY	CAL	ATL	MAR	KAN	CLT	MFD	DOV	TEX	MCH	MLW	MEM	KEN	IRP	NSH	BRI	GTW	NHA	LVS	TAL	MAR; 36	ATL	TEX	PHO	HOM	113th	55	

==== K&N Pro Series East ====
NASCAR K&N Pro Series East results
Year	Team	No.	Make	1	2	3	4	5	6	7	8	9	10	11	12	13	14	NKNPSEC	Pts	Ref
2004		20	Chevy	LEE	TMP	LRP	SEE	STA	HOL	ERI	WFD	NHA	ADI	GLN	NHA; 27	DOV		61st	82	
2005	Barney McRae	5	Chevy	STA; 14	HOL; 10	ERI; 8	NHA; 26	WFD; 6	ADI; 13	STA; 9	**DUB**; 22*	OXF; 17	NHA; 21	DOV; 3	LRP; 10	**TMP**; 4		7th	1682	
2006	Andy Santerre Racing	44	Chevy	GRE; 1*	**STA**; 1	**HOL**; 8*	**TMP**; 28	ERI; 2*	NHA; 2*	ADI; 1	**WFD**; 6	NHA; 14*	**DOV**; 22	LRP; 5				2nd	1699	
2007	Andy Santerre Racing	44	Chevy	GRE; 2*	**ELK**; 1*	IOW; 18	SBO; 27	**STA**; 24	NHA; 24	**TMP**; 1*	**NSH**; 18	ADI; 2	LRP; 2	**MFD**; 1*	NHA; 2	DOV; 1		2nd	1957	
2009	Dave Davis	03	Chevy	GRE	TRI	IOW	SBO; 7	GLN	NHA	TMP	ADI	LRP	NHA	DOV				51st	146	
2010	NDS Motorsports	35	Chevy	GRE	SBO	IOW	MAR	NHA	LRP	LEE	JFC; 13	NHA	DOV					54th	124	
2012	MacDonald Motorsports	49	Dodge	BRI	GRE	RCH	IOW	BGS; 17	JFC	LGY	CNB	COL	IOW	NHA	DOV	GRE	CAR	62nd	27	

==== Featherlite Modified Tour ====
NASCAR Featherlite Modified Tour results
Year	Car owner	No.	Make	1	2	3	4	5	6	7	8	9	10	11	12	13	14	15	16	17	18	19	NFMTC	Pts	Ref
2004		21	Chevy	TMP; DNQ	STA; DNQ	WFD; 30	NZH	STA	RIV	LER	BLL	BEE; 29	NHA; 34	SEE; DNQ	RIV	STA; DNQ	**TMP**; 29	WFD	TMP	NHA	STA	TMP	50th	425	

^{*} Season still in progress
^{1} Ineligible for series points

=== ARCA Re/Max Series ===
(key) (Bold – Pole position awarded by qualifying time. Italics – Pole position earned by points standings or practice time. * – Most laps led.)

ARCA Re/Max Series results
Year	Team	No.	Make	1	2	3	4	5	6	7	8	9	10	11	12	13	14	15	16	17	18	19	20	21	ARSC	Pts	Ref
2008	Hattori Racing Enterprises	01	Toyota	DAY	SLM	IOW	KAN	CAR	**KEN**; 28	TOL	POC	MCH; 19*	CAY	KEN; 2	BLN	POC	NSH; 16*	ISF	DSF	CHI	SLM; 5*	NJE	TAL	TOL	37th	875	
2009	Venturini Motorsports	25	Chevy	DAY	SLM	CAR; 1	TAL	KEN	TOL; 25	POC	MCH	MFD	IOW	KEN	BLN	POC	ISF	CHI	TOL	DSF	NJE	SLM	KAN	CAR	77th	335	

^{*} Season still in progress
^{1} Ineligible for series points
