= U.S. Pro Stock/Super Late Model Championship =

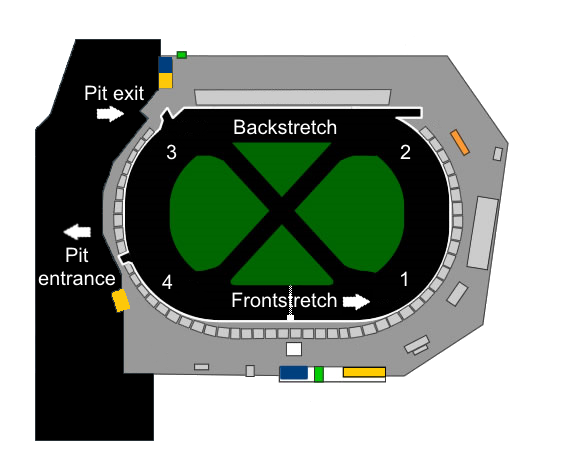
- Venue: Seekonk Speedway
- Location: Seekonk, Massachusetts, United States
- First race: 2016
- Distance: 67 mi (108 km)
- Laps: 200
- Most wins (driver): Tom Scully Jr. (1); Derek Griffith (1); Reid Lanpher (1)
- Most wins (manufacturer): Chevrolet (3)

Circuit information
- Surface: Asphalt
- Length: .333 mi (0.536 km)
- Turns: 4

The U.S. Pro Stock/Super Late Model Championship was a 200 lap super late model race held annually at Seekonk Speedway. The event was aimed at creating a race similar to the Snowball Derby in New England.

The race was scheduled to run the Wednesday before the Monster Energy NASCAR Cup Series runs their July race at New Hampshire Motor Speedway, in hopes of gaining the attention of Cup teams and encouraging them to enter the race.

== Race setup ==
The rules for the 200 lap race were very lenient, allowing competitors from across the country come to the track in hopes of winning a $10,000 pay check. All cars were required to run the same American Racer racing slicks used by Seekonk's weekly pro stock competitors. The race itself was a non-points race for the Whelen All-American Series. Racing action was separated into two 100 lap race segments. The time between the two 100 lap races is used to host other racing (In the case of 2016, pro-4 modifieds and legends. Qualifying was split into heat races, where 20 drivers (including guaranteed-starters) will qualify. A final six positions were filled in by consolation races. Between the two 100 lap races, the winner of the first 100 laps draws a number to determine an inversion for the second 100 lap feature.

Several New England race tracks host their own super late model races, some of which were used as guaranteed-starter races. Which races were and weren't used as guaranteed-starter races were determined before the racing season started. The whole event was sponsored by Kraze Korlacki Speed Equipment, who offered payouts and promoted the race. It was up to their discretion how many cars are eligible for the race, but 26 was the number used to explain race procedure. There was a $47,160 total prize; $42,160 coming from Kraze Korlacki Speed Equipment, and $5,000 coming from lap sponsorship. Anyone was eligible to sponsor a lap for $25.

== Race winners ==
Year	Date	Driver	Manufacturer	Race distance		Race time
Year	Date	Driver	Manufacturer	Laps	Miles (km)	Race time
2016	July 13	Tom Scully Jr.	Chevrolet	200	67 (108)	1:27:21
2017	July 19	Derek Griffith	Chevrolet	200	67 (108)	57:39
2018	July 18	Reid Lanpher	Chevrolet	200	67 (108)	1:41:32

== By year ==
=== 2016 ===
The race's finish was voted second best in Speed51's best finishes of 2016.

2016 U.S. PS/SLM Championship time trials
Position	Driver	Number	Time
1	Joey Pole	97	12.392
2	Derek Griffith	12D	12.400
3	Dalton Sargeant	55	12.400
4	DJ Shaw	72	12.405
5	Derek Ramstrom	35	12.408
6	Angelo Belsito*	8	12.466
7	David Darling*	52	12.471
8	Rick Martin*	14	12.507
9	Kenny Spencer III*	0	12.512
10	Ryan Lineham*	48	12.534
11	Tom Scully Jr.*	2	12.537
12	Craig Weinstein*	90	12.582
13	Dick Houlihan*	41	12.586
14	Cory Casagrande	1	12.586
15	Jeremy Davis	09	12.592
16	Bobby Pelland III*	12	12.594
17	Wyatt Alexander	96	12.595
18	Fred Astle*	30	12.676
19	Mike Fowler	66	12.694
20	Robert Hussey*	80	12.918
21	Mike Scorzelli	18	13.008
22	Ben Bosowski	75	13.331
*Weekly Seekonk Speedway competitors

2016 U.S. PS/SLM Championship heat 1
Position	Driver	Number	Time
1	Joey Pole	97	12.440
2	DJ Shaw	72	12.527
3	Ryan Lineham*	48	12.585
4	David Darling*	52	12.587
5	Bobby Pelland III*	12	12.692
6	Dick Houlihan*	41	12.734
7	Mike Fowler	66	12.842
8	Ben Bosowski	75	13.152
*Weekly Seekonk Speedway competitors

2016 U.S. PS/SLM Championship heat 2
Position	Driver	Number	Time
1	Derek Griffith	12D	12.585
2	Rick Martin*	14	12.553
3	Tom Scully Jr.*	2	12.615
4	Derek Ramstrom	35	12.540
5	Wyatt Alexander	96	12.639
6	Cory Casagrande	1	12.686
7	Robert Hussey*	80	18.985
*Weekly Seekonk Speedway competitors

2016 U.S. PS/SLM Championship heat 3
Position	Driver	Number	Time
1	Dalton Sargeant	55	12.507
2	Angelo Belsito*	8	12.560
3	Kenny Spencer III*	0	12.519
4	Jeremy Davis	09	12.727
5	Craig Weinstein*	90	12.626
6	Fred Astle*	30	12.727
7	Mike Scorzelli	18	12.982
*Weekly Seekonk Speedway competitors

2016 U.S. PS/SLM Championship race results
Position	Start	Driver	No	Laps
1	8	Tom Scully Jr.*	2	200
2	2	Derek Griffith	12D	200
3	3	DJ Shaw	72	200
4	11	Derek Ramstrom	35	200
5	4	Dalton Sargeant	55	200
6	10	David Darling*	52	200
7	12	Jeremy Davis	09	200
8	6	Angelo Belsito*	8	200
9	14	Wyatt Alexander	96	200
10	9	Kenny Spencer III*	0	200
11	13	Bobby Pelland III*	12	200
12	17	Cory Casagrande	1	198
13	16	Dick Houlihan*	41	197
14	22	Robert Hussey*	80	196
15	5	Rick Martin*	14	193
16	1	Joey Pole	97	192
17	7	Ryan Lineham*	48	186
18	19	Mike Fowler	66	170
19	15	Craig Weinstein*	90	122
20	21	Ben Bosowski	75	104
21	20	Mike Scorzelli	18	101
22	18	Fred Astle*	30	64
23	23	Cole Littlewood	61	DNS
*Weekly Seekonk Speedway competitors

=== 2017 ===
2017 U.S. PS/SLM Championship time trials
Position	Driver	Number	Time
1	David Darling*	52	12.289
2	Derek Griffith	12G	12.316
3	Travis Benjamin	14	12.348
4	Joey Pole	97	12.357
5	Derek Ramstrom	35	12.382
6	Garrett Hall	94	12.382
7	Joseph Graf	12J	12.398
8	Eddie MacDonald	17MA	12.417
9	Reid Lanpher	99	12.433
10	Kyle Casper*	7	12.504
11	Ryan Vanesse*	11	12.528
12	Bobby Pelland III*	12	12.529
13	Woody Pitkat	42	12.555
14	Tom Scully Jr.*	2	12.575
15	Devin O'Connell	43	12.584
16	Joey Mooch	45	12.598
17	Mike Brightman*	27	12.600
18	Raphael Lessard	99	12.628
19	Kevin Folan*	21	12.672
20	Cole Littlewood	12L	13.042
21	Steve Pailler	66	13.199
*Weekly Seekonk Speedway competitors

2017 U.S. PS/SLM Championship heat 1
Position	Driver	Number	Time
1	Joey Pole	97	12.539
2	David Darling*	52	12.527
3	Kyle Casper*	7	12.639
4	Kevin Folan*	17	12.813
5	Joseph Graf	12J	12.679
6	Joey Mooch	45	12.688
7	Woody Pitkat	42	12.755
*Weekly Seekonk Speedway competitors

2017 U.S. PS/SLM Championship heat 2
Position	Driver	Number	Time
1	Eddie MacDonald	17MA	12.503
2	Derek Griffith	12G	12.547
3	Tom Scully Jr.*	2	12.552
4	Ryan Vanesse*	11	12.623
5	Derek Ramstrom	35	12.633
6	Mike Brightman*	27	12.711
7	Cole Littlewood	12L	13.065
*Weekly Seekonk Speedway competitors

2017 U.S. PS/SLM Championship heat 3
Position	Driver	Number	Time
1	Travis Benjamin	14	12.738
2	Bobby Pelland III*	12	12.709
3	Reid Lanpher	59	12.679
4	Raphael Lessard	99	12.699
5	Devin O'Connell	43	12.814
6	Steve Pailler	66	13.162
*Weekly Seekonk Speedway competitors

2017 U.S. PS/SLM Championship race results
Position	Start	Driver	No	Laps
1	6	Derek Griffith	12G	200
2	21	Garrett Hall	94	200
3	13	Derek Ramstrom	35	200
4	2	Eddie MacDonald	17MA	200
5	4	David Darling*	52	200
6	3	Travis Benjamin	14	200
7	17	Mike Brightman*	27	200
8	1	Joey Pole	97	200
9	9	Reid Lanpher	59	200
10	7	Kyle Casper*	7	199
11	5	Bobby Pelland III*	12	198
12	19	Woody Pitkat	42	196
13	20	Cole Littlewood	12L	181
14	11	Ryan Vanesse*	11	171
15	14	Joseph Graf	12J	141
16	12	Raphael Lessard	99	112
17	8	Tom Scully Jr.*	2	72
18	10	Kevin Folan*	17	66
19	18	Steve Pailler	66	14
20	16	Devin O'Connell	43	12
21	15	Joey Mooch	45	2
*Weekly Seekonk Speedway competitors

=== 2018 ===
2018 U.S. PS/SLM Championship time trials
Position	Driver	Number	Time
1	Travis Benjamin	14	12.306
2	Reid Lanpher	59	12.342
3	David Darling*	52	12.355
4	Jake Johnson*	15	12.370
5	Derek Griffith	12G	12.381
6	Cory Casagrande	7	12.389
7	Nick Johnson*	6	12.392
8	Wyatt Alexander	96	12.400
9	Dylan Estrella*	46	12.405
10	Joe Squeglia	03	12.407
11	Dave Farrington Jr.	23	12.466
12	Joey Pole	97	12.472
13	Mike Mitchell*	48	12.476
14	Ryan Kuhn*	72	12.486
15	Garrett Hall	94	12.533
16	Devin O'Connell	43	12.567
17	Craig Weinstein	90	12.568
18	Ryan Vanesse*	11	12.569
19	Jake Vanada	31	12.579
20	Mike Brightman*	27	12.588
21	Derek Ramstrom	35	12.599
22	Nick Lascoula	39	12.601
23	Joe Graf	12J	12.605
24	Robert Pelland III*	12	12.677
25	Kevin Folan*	17	12.771
26	Bob Hussey*	80	13.018
27	Cole Littlewood	73	13.062
28	Brandon Turbush	NY21	13.278
*Weekly Seekonk Speedway competitors

2018 U.S. PS/SLM Championship heat 1
Position	Driver	Number	Time
1	Travis Benjamin	14	12.569
2	Nick Johnson*	6	12.574
3	Jake Johnson*	15	12.587
4	Joe Squeglia	03	12.637
5	Mike Mitchell*	48	12.759
6	Nick Lascoula	39	12.727
7	Devin O'Connell	43	12.884
8	Kevin Folan*	17	12.861
9	Jake Vanada	31	12.774
10	Brandon Turbush	NY21	13.022
*Weekly Seekonk Speedway competitors

2018 U.S. PS/SLM Championship heat 2
Position	Driver	Number	Time
1	Reid Lanpher	59	12.427
2	Derek Griffith	12G	12.481
3	Dave Farrington Jr.	23	12.521
4	Wyatt Alexander	96	12.479
5	Ryan Kuhn*	72	12.619
6	Mike Brightman*	27	12.765
7	Craig Weinstein	90	12.614
8	Joseph Graf	12J	12.706
9	Bob Hussey*	80	13.169
*Weekly Seekonk Speedway competitors

2018 U.S. PS/SLM Championship heat 3
Position	Driver	Number	Time
1	David Darling*	52	12.447
2	Dylan Estrella*	46	12.508
3	Joey Pole	97	12.553
4	Cory Casagrande	7	12.620
5	Garrett Hall	94	12.701
6	Derek Ramstrom	35	12.778
7	Ryan Vanesse*	11	12.871
8	Robert Pelland III*	12	12.774
9	Cole Littlewood	73	13.119
*Weekly Seekonk Speedway competitors

2018 U.S. PS/SLM Championship consolation race
Position	Driver	Number	Time
1	Devin O'Connell	43	12.784
2	Ryan Vanesse*	11	12.835
3	Craig Weinstein	90	12.842
4	Kevin Folan*	17	12.855
5	Jake Vanada	31	12.914
6	Joseph Graf	12J	12.942
7	Cole Littlewood	73	13.243
8	Brandon Turbush	NY21	13.235
9	Robert Pelland III*	12	DNS
10	Bob Hussey*	80	DNS
*Weekly Seekonk Speedway competitors

2018 U.S. PS/SLM Championship race results
Position	Start	Driver	No	Laps
1	2	Reid Lanpher	59	200
2	9	Joe Squeglia	03	200
3	17	Derek Ramstrom	35	200
4	7	Dave Farrington Jr.	23	200
5	16	Garrett Hall	94	200
6	12	Wyatt Alexander	96	200
7	14	Mike Mitchell*	48	200
8	22	Craig Weinstein	90	200
9	8	Jake Johnson*	15	200
10	11	Cory Casagrande	7	200
11	13	Ryan Kuhn*	72	200
12	15	Nick Lascoula	39	199
13	21	Kevin Folan*	17	194
14	24	Jake Vanada	31	181
15	10	Joey Pole	97	170
16	5	Dylan Estrella*	46	163
17	1	Travis Benjamin	14	163
18	18	Mike Brightman*	27	154
19	23	Joseph Graf	12J	120
20	4	Nick Johnson*	6	90
21	19	Ryan Vanesse*	11	83
22	20	Devin O'Connell	43	80
23	3	David Darling*	52	66
24	6	Derek Griffith	12G	59
*Weekly Seekonk Speedway competitors
