= Chase Austin =

American racing driver (born 1989)

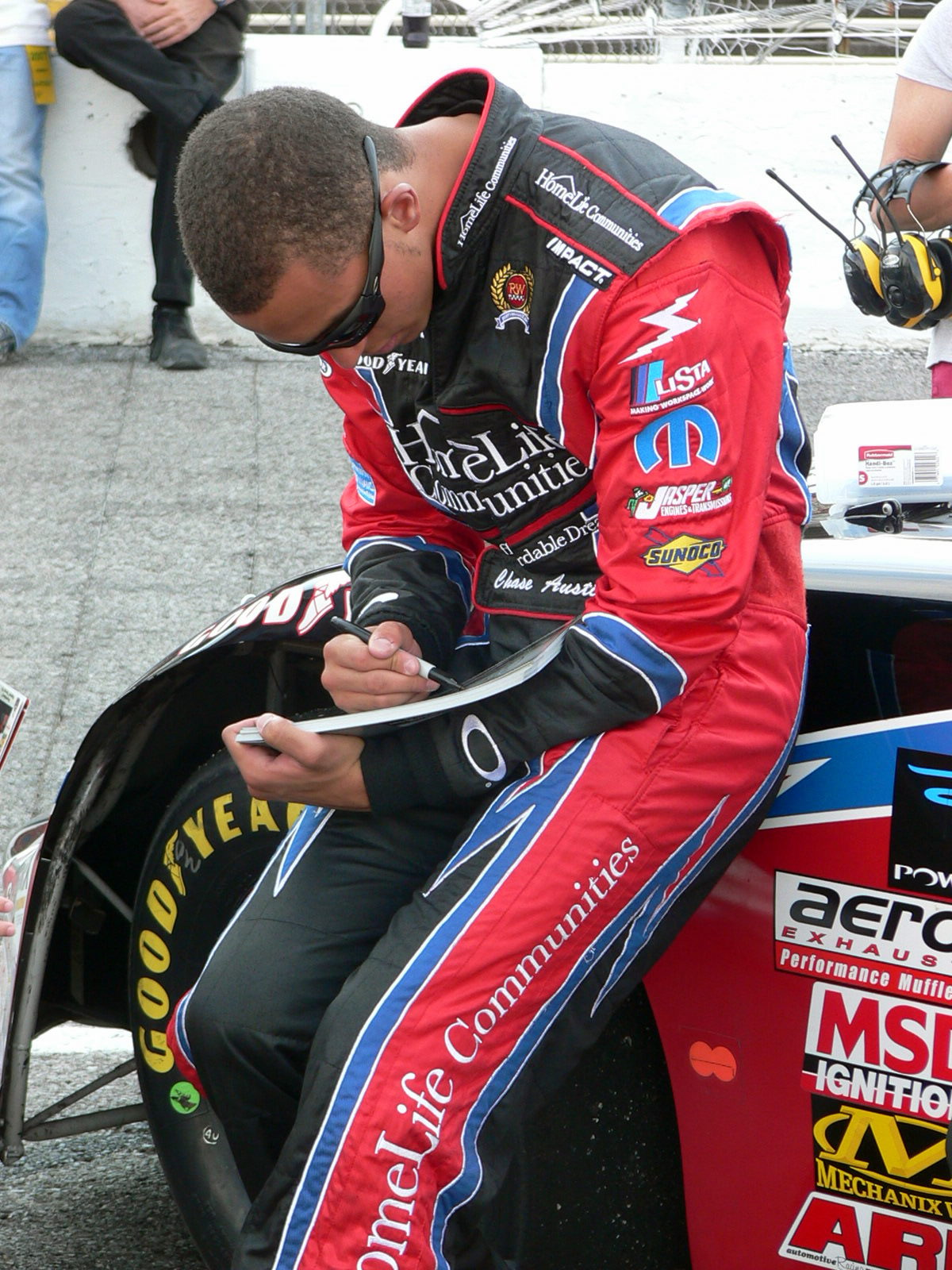
- Austin at Nashville Fairgrounds Speedway in 2007
- Born: October 3, 1989 (age 37); Eudora, Kansas, U.S.

NASCAR O'Reilly Auto Parts Series career
- 6 races run over 3 years
- Best finish: 89th (2009)
- First race: 2007 Sam's Town 250 (Memphis)
- Last race: 2010 Carfax 250 (Michigan)
Wins	Top tens	Poles
0	0	0

NASCAR FedEx Freight Truck Series career
- 3 races run over 2 years
- Best finish: 63rd (2009)
- First race: 2009 NextEra Energy Resources 250 (Daytona)
- Last race: 2010 VFW 200 (Michigan)
Wins	Top tens	Poles
0	0	0
- Statistics up to date as of November 19, 2011.

Chase Austin (born October 3, 1989) is an American former professional racing driver. He is a former development driver with Hendrick Motorsports and Rusty Wallace Racing, racing in NASCAR's Nationwide and Camping World Truck Series. He also competed in the Firestone Indy Lights series from 2011 to 2014.

== Background ==
Austin started racing when he was seven, in an old worn out go kart he built with his father. He earned over sixty wins while racing karts in the late 1990s to early 2000s. In 2001, he raced in micro sprint cars and won sixteen features in two years. Then he moved up to full size sprint cars, dirt track racing modifieds, and late models on dirt and asphalt. While competing in the Kansas area, he won over one-hundred features in karts, sprint cars and stock cars. He won the "Future Dirt Track World Championship", a dirt late model race for around a dozen of the United States' top teenaged drivers.

== NASCAR career ==
In late 2004, at age 14, Austin signed a driver development deal with Hendrick Motorsports. Hendrick assigned him to race for the team's ally SS Racing in the ASA Late Model Series.

In 2009, he won two races with one top five, six top ten finishes and a pole position.

Hendrick dissolved its driver development program in 2006. Originally backed by the new STAR Motorsports team, the deal fell through after STAR failed to fulfill its financial obligations. Austin's family was given a race shop and car parts, so they used the parts to race in numerous series. While a sixteen-year-old in high school, Austin was the driver and crew chief for the family effort. He raced in 23 events in the season, with three wins, six top fives, and eight top tens. He competed on dirt and asphalt. He competed in his first USAR Hooters Procup Series race.

Austin made one start at the 2007 Sam's Town 250 at Memphis Motorsports Park for RWI, finishing 41st after crashing out. In that start, he became the first African American driver to start in a NASCAR Busch Series (then the name of the XFINITY Series) oval track race, and the second African American driver to start in the series' history. He started in eleven NASCAR Grand National Division, Busch East Series races, with four top ten finishes. He had his first start in ARCA that season. He was scheduled to run fifteen races for RWI in the Nationwide Series in 2008, but those plans were postponed. He left the team later in the season. He was announced as the driver of the No. 32 Trail Motorsport Chevrolet Silverado in 2009, but the team closed very early in the season. Chase Austin picked up a ride with Xxxtreme Motorsport to drive the No. 07 Chevrolet part-time. During the Nationwide Series race at Bristol Motor Speedway on August 21, 2009, he crashed heavily with Kyle Busch and Reed Sorenson while dropping down the track following a punctured tire.

Austin ran a Camping World Truck and Nationwide race in 2010 for the newly formed United Racing Group with sponsorship from Walgreens and Forgotten Harvest.

== Indy Lights and IndyCar ==
When unable to find a ride in NASCAR in 2011, Austin signed on with African American former IndyCar driver Willy T. Ribbs in association with Brooks Associates Racing to make his Firestone Indy Lights debut in the Firestone Freedom 100 at the Indianapolis Motor Speedway. Austin also competed in the Freedom 100 in 2012.

In August 2012, it was announced that Austin would drive for A. J. Foyt Enterprises in the 2013 Indianapolis 500. However, the second Foyt Indy 500 entry was ultimately driven by Conor Daly.

== Personal life ==
Austin is the son of an African American father and a Caucasian mother. He is married and lives in Houston, Texas.

== Racing record ==
=== American open–wheel racing results ===
(key)

==== Indy Lights ====
Year	Team	1	2	3	4	5	6	7	8	9	10	11	12	13	14	Rank	Points
2011	Willy T. Ribbs Racing Brooks Associates Racing	STP	ALA	LBH	INDY; 9	MIL	IOW; 10	TOR	EDM1	EDM2	TRO	NHM	BAL	KTY	LVS	**23rd**	**42**
2012	Juncos Racing	STP	ALA	LBH	INDY; 10	DET	MIL	IOW; 8	TOR	EDM	TRO	BAL	FON			**17th**	**44**
2013	Bryan Herta Autosport Jeffery Mark Motorsports	STP	ALA	LBH	INDY; 8	MIL	IOW	POC	TOR	MOH	BAL	HOU	FON			**17th**	**24**
2014	Belardi Auto Racing	STP	LBH	ALA	ALA	IND	IND	INDY; 11	POC	TOR	MOH	MOH	MIL	SNM	SNM	**17th**	**1**

=== NASCAR ===
(key) (Bold – Pole position awarded by qualifying time. Italics – Pole position earned by points standings or practice time. * – Most laps led.)

==== Nationwide Series ====
NASCAR Nationwide Series results
Year	Team	No.	Make	1	2	3	4	5	6	7	8	9	10	11	12	13	14	15	16	17	18	19	20	21	22	23	24	25	26	27	28	29	30	31	32	33	34	35	NNSC	Pts	Ref
2007	Rusty Wallace Racing	64	Chevy	DAY	CAL	MXC	LVS	ATL	BRI	NSH	TEX	PHO	TAL	RCH	DAR	CLT	DOV	NSH	KEN	MLW	NHA	DAY	CHI	GTY	IRP	CGV	GLN	MCH	BRI	CAL	RCH	DOV	KAN	CLT	MEM; 41	TEX	PHO	HOM	153rd	40	
2009	Xxxtreme Motorsport	07	Chevy	DAY	CAL	LVS	BRI	TEX	NSH	PHO	TAL	RCH	DAR	CLT	DOV	NSH	KEN	MLW	NHA	DAY; 37	CHI	GTY	IRP; 32	IOW	GLN	MCH	BRI; 36	CGV	ATL; 29	RCH	DOV	KAN	CAL	CLT	MEM	TEX	PHO		89th	255	
2009	Xxxtreme Motorsport	58	Chevy																																			HOM; DNQ	89th	255	
2010	Xxxtreme Motorsport	58	Chevy	DAY; Wth	CAL	LVS	BRI	NSH	PHO	TEX	TAL	RCH	DAR	DOV	CLT	NSH	KEN	ROA	NHA	DAY	CHI	GTY	IRP	IOW	GLN														135th	58	
2010	Curb Racing	43	Dodge																							MCH; 35	BRI	CGV	ATL	RCH	DOV	KAN	CAL	CLT	GTY	TEX	PHO	HOM	135th	58	

==== Camping World Truck Series ====
NASCAR Camping World Truck Series results
Year	Team	No.	Make	1	2	3	4	5	6	7	8	9	10	11	12	13	14	15	16	17	18	19	20	21	22	23	24	25	NCWTC	Pts	Ref
2009	Trail Motorsports	32	Chevy	DAY; 13	CAL; 23	ATL	MAR	KAN; Wth	CLT	DOV	TEX	MCH	MLW	MEM	KEN	IRP	NSH	BRI	CHI	IOW	GTW	NHA	LVS	MAR	TAL	TEX	PHO	HOM	63rd	218	
2010	United Racing Group	46	Dodge	DAY	ATL	MAR	NSH	KAN	DOV	CLT	TEX	MCH; 35	IOW	GTY	IRP	POC	NSH	DAR	BRI	CHI	KEN	NHA	LVS	MAR	TAL	TEX	PHO	HOM	118th	58	

==== Busch East Series ====
NASCAR Busch East Series results
Year	Team	No.	Make	1	2	3	4	5	6	7	8	9	10	11	12	13	NBEC	Pts	Ref
2007	Rusty Wallace Racing	66	Dodge	GRE; 19			SBO; 10	STA; 8	NHA; 32	TMP; 25	NSH; 11	ADI; 7	LRP; 15	MFD; 17	NHA; 30	DOV; 6	15th	1322	
2007	Rusty Wallace Racing	64	Dodge		ELK; DNQ	IOW; DNQ											15th	1322	

=== ARCA Re/Max Series ===
(key) (Bold – Pole position awarded by qualifying time. Italics – Pole position earned by points standings or practice time. * – Most laps led.)

ARCA Re/Max Series results
Year	Team	No.	Make	1	2	3	4	5	6	7	8	9	10	11	12	13	14	15	16	17	18	19	20	21	22	23	ARSC	Pts	Ref
2007	Rusty Wallace Racing	61	Dodge	DAY	USA	NSH	SLM	KAN	WIN	KEN	TOL	IOW	POC	MCH	BLN	KEN	POC	NSH	ISF	MIL	GTW	DSF	CHI	SLM	TAL; 32	TOL	163rd	70	
2008	Rusty Wallace Racing	61	Chevy	DAY; DNQ	SLM	IOW	KAN	CAR	KEN	TOL	POC	MCH	CAY	KEN	BLN	POC	NSH	ISF	DSF	CHI	SLM	NJE	TAL	TOL			N/A	0	
