= Boston Louie Memorial =

Annual NEMA race at Seekonk Speedway

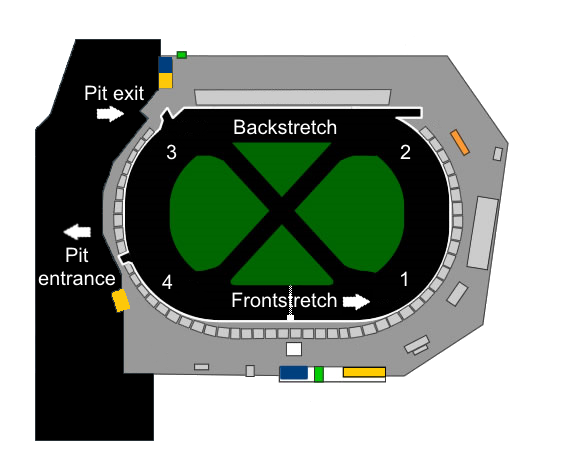

Northeastern Midget Association
- Venue: Seekonk Speedway (1997–2001, 2005–2019, 2021–present); Waterford Speedbowl (2002–2004)
- Location: Seekonk, Massachusetts, United States (1997–2001, 2005–2019, 2021–present); Waterford, Connecticut, United States (2002–2004)
- First race: 1997
- Distance: 10 mi (16 km)
- Laps: 29
- Most wins (driver): Randy Cabral (3); Jeff Abold (3); PJ Stergios (3)

Circuit information
- Surface: Asphalt
- Length: 0.536 km (0.333 mi)
- Turns: 4

The Boston Louie Memorial is a NEMA Light and Midget race held annually at Seekonk Speedway's Open Wheel Wednesday. The event headlines as two races, both 29 laps long in memorial of Louie's chosen car number as an owner. "Boston" Louie Seymour died on September 13, 1996.

== 2002–2004 location change ==
The 2002–2004 Boston Louie Memorial races were all held at the Waterford Speedbowl, not Seekonk Speedway. This happened after the 2001 racing season for NEMA, when the series was determining its schedule. Seekonk Speedway had just finished its racing season, and was in the process of shutting down the track for the Winter months. Seekonk officials generally decide their schedules the year of the racing season, not at the close of the season. When NEMA contacted Seekonk officials to get an early commitment for a 2002 race date, the Seekonk officials did not want to confirm a date yet, due to the racing season still months away for them. Despite open communications, NEMA eventually moved the race to Waterford. NEMA and Seekonk officials still wanted to give a race date due to the history NEMA has with Seekonk, but Seekonk officials felt that they needed addition sponsorship for the race, along with the sponsorship NEMA would be bringing for the race. The Boston Louie Memorial would later return to Seekonk Speedway in 2005, and has stayed at Seekonk from then on.

== Race winners ==
Year	Name	M/L	Track
1997	Russ Stoehr	Midget	Seekonk Speedway
1998	Drew Fornoro	Midget	Seekonk Speedway
1999	Bobby Seymour	Midget	Seekonk Speedway
2000	Randy Cabral	Midget	Seekonk Speedway
2001	Jeff Horn	Midget	Seekonk Speedway
2002	Bobby Santos	Midget	Waterford Speedbowl
2003	Joey Payne	Midget	Waterford Speedbowl
2004	Ben Seitz	Midget	Waterford Speedbowl
2005	Joey Payne	Midget	Seekonk Speedway
2006	Nokie Fornoro	Midget	Seekonk Speedway
2007	Ben Seitz	Midget	Seekonk Speedway
2008	Shaun Gosselin	Light	Seekonk Speedway
2008	Randy Cabral	Midget	Seekonk Speedway
2009	Anthony Marvuglio	Light	Seekonk Speedway
2009	Jeff Abold	Midget	Seekonk Speedway
2010	Anthony Nocella	Light	Seekonk Speedway
2010	Jeff Abold	Midget	Seekonk Speedway
2011	David Moniz	Light	Seekonk Speedway
2011	Jeff Abold	Midget	Seekonk Speedway
2012	Canceled due to weather		Seekonk Speedway
2013	PJ Stergios	Light	Seekonk Speedway
2013	Doug Coby	Midget	Seekonk Speedway
2014	PJ Stergios	Light	Seekonk Speedway
2014	Randy Cabral	Midget	Seekonk Speedway
2015	PJ Stergios	Light	Seekonk Speedway
2015	Todd Bertrand	Midget	Seekonk Speedway
2016	Jim Chambers	Light	Seekonk Speedway
2016	Doug Coby	Midget	Seekonk Speedway
2017	Dylan Duhaime	Light	Seekonk Speedway
2017	John Zych	Midget	Seekonk Speedway
2018	Dan Cugini	Light	Seekonk Speedway
2018	Randy Cabral	Midget	Seekonk Speedway
2019	Ryan Locke	Light	Seekonk Speedway
2019	Avery Stoehr	Midget	Seekonk Speedway
2020	Not ran due to COVID-19		Seekonk Speedway
