= 2007 NASCAR Busch East Series =

NASCAR season

Seasons
- ← 2006 2008 →

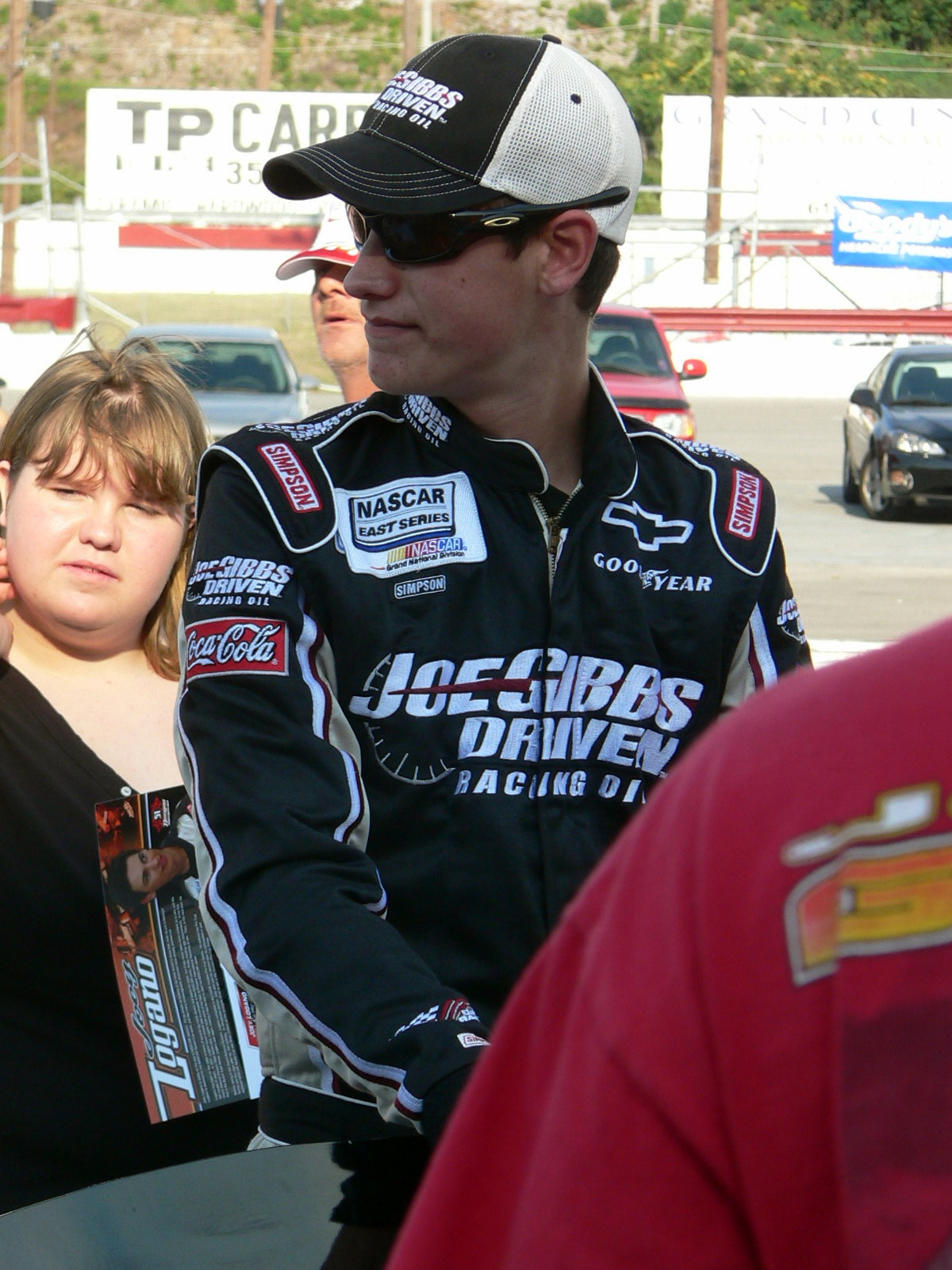
Joey Logano, the 2007 Busch East Series champion.

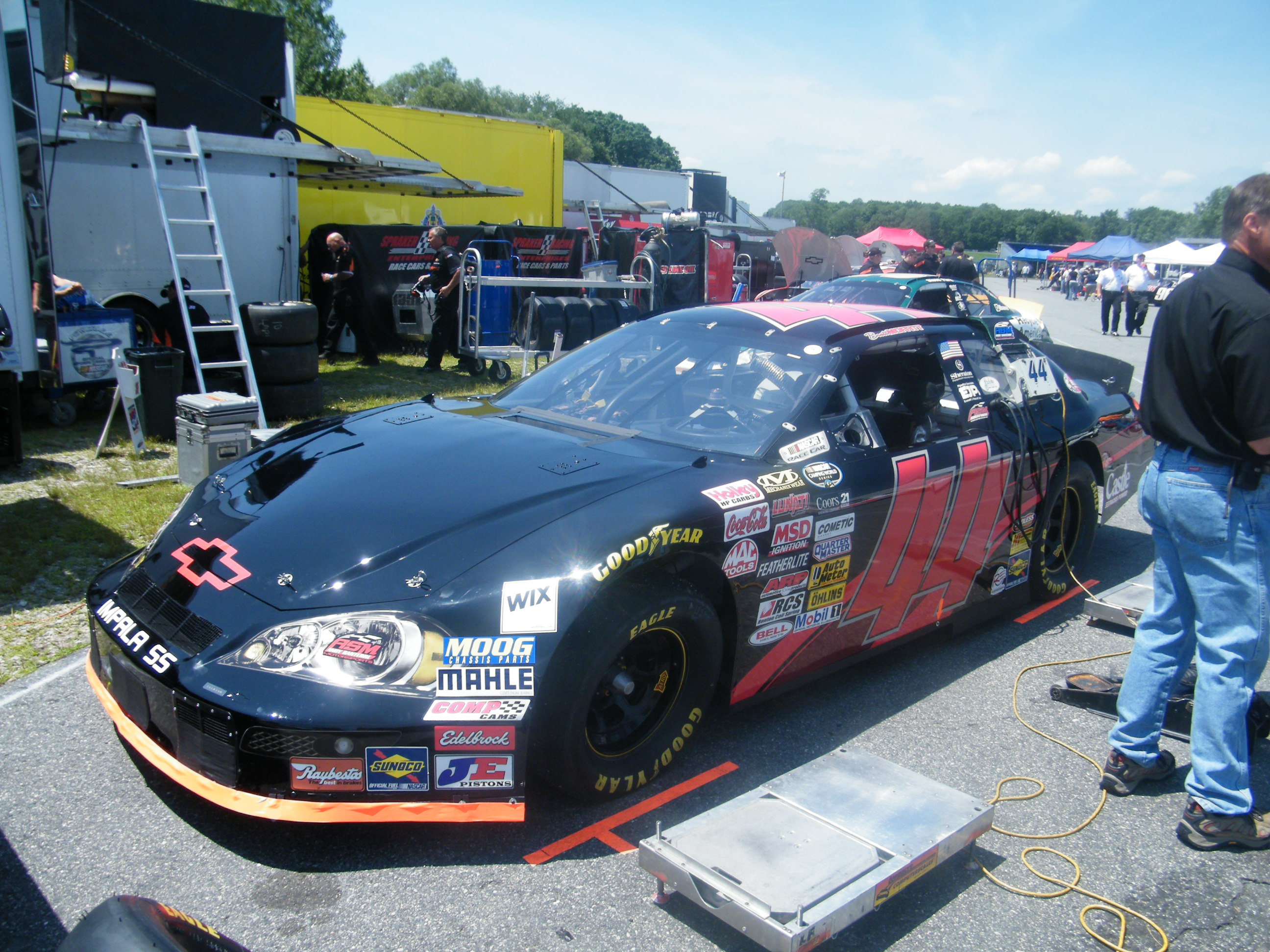
Sean Caisse, driving the No. 44 car for Andy Santerre, finished second behind Logano in the championship by 166 points.

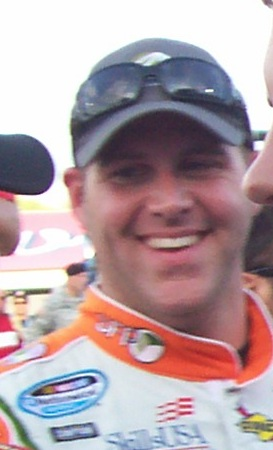
Peyton Sellers finished third in the championship.

The 2007 NASCAR Busch East Series was the 21st season of the Busch East Series, a stock car racing series sanctioned by NASCAR. The season consisted of thirteen races and began on April 28 at Greenville-Pickens Speedway with the Greased Lightning 150. The season finale, the Sunoco 150, was held on September 21 at Dover International Speedway. Mike Olsen entered the season as the defending drivers' champion. Joey Logano won the championship, 166 points in front of Sean Caisse.

This season was the last season with Anheuser-Busch's Busch Beer as the series' title sponsor after a 21-year relationship. Busch was replaced by Camping World as the title sponsor for 2008.

By virtue of NASCAR's lower age limit of 16 starting this year for its touring series, Logano became the youngest champion of the series at that time. He started the season when he was just 16 years old, and turned 17 during the season on May 24. The lowering of the age limit in 2007 was instrumental in the future of the series, as most of the drivers who compete in the East Series now are teenagers. The age limit would eventually be lowered again to 15, which is what it is today.

== Schedule ==
No.	Race title	Track	Date	TV
1	Greased Lightning 150	Greenville-Pickens Speedway, Greenville, South Carolina	April 28	SPEED*
2	Minnesota 150	Elko Speedway, Elko New Market, Minnesota	May 18	HDNet
3	Featherlite Coaches 200	Iowa Speedway, Newton, Iowa	May 20	HDNet
4	South Boston 150	South Boston Speedway, South Boston, Virginia	June 2	
5	TSI Harley-Davidson 150	Stafford Motor Speedway, Stafford Springs, Connecticut	June 8	SPEED*
6	New England 125	New Hampshire International Speedway, Loudon, New Hampshire	June 29	SPEED*
7	Pepsi Racing 100	Thompson International Speedway, Thompson, Connecticut	July 14	HDNet
8	Music City 150	Music City Motorplex, Nashville, Tennessee	July 22	HDNet
9	The Edge Hotel 150	Adirondack International Speedway, New Bremen, New York	July 28	HDNet
10	Mohegan Sun NASCAR Busch East 200	Lime Rock Park, Lakeville, Connecticut	August 18	HDNet
11	Mansfield 150	Mansfield Motorsports Park, Mansfield, Ohio	August 25	HDNet
12	Aubuchon Hardware 125 presented by hardwarestore.com	New Hampshire International Speedway, Loudon, New Hampshire	September 14	HDNet
13	Sunoco 150	Dover International Speedway, Dover, Delaware	September 21	HDNet

^{*} Races will air on delay only. All HDNet races will air live and re-air on SPEED.

=== Television ===
Both HDNet and SPEED returned to broadcast most of the races. HDNet broadcast nine of the races, including the final seven, live in high definition. Speed aired three of the remaining four races by a broadcast delay. All of the races shown on HDNet were also re-broadcast in standard definition on Speed.

== 2007 Series Races ==
=== Greased Lightning 150 ===
The Greased Lightning 150 was run on April 28 at Greenville-Pickens Speedway in Greenville, SC. Joey Logano sat on the pole for the event and went on to win the event. This marked Logano's first pole and first win in the series in his first start.

Official Results
Finish	Start	Car #	Driver	Hometown	Car	Laps	Reason Out
1	1	20	Joey Logano	Middletown, Conn.	Chevrolet	150	
2	2	44	Sean Caisse	Pelham, N.H.	Chevrolet	150	
3	3	99	Bryon Chew	Mattituck, N.Y.	Chevrolet	150	
4	5	83	Peyton Sellers	Danville, Va.	Chevrolet	150	
5	11	03	Rogelio López	Mexico City, Mexico	Chevrolet	150	
6	8	1	Jeffrey Earnhardt	Mooresville, N.C.	Chevrolet	150	
7	16	61	Mike Olsen	N. Haverhill, N.H.	Chevrolet	150	
8	21	37	Michelle Theriault	Bristol, Conn.	Chevrolet	150	
9	7	57	John S. Freeman	Huntersville, N.C.	Chevrolet	150	
10	20	3	John Wes Townley	Watkinsville, Ga.	Chevrolet	150	
11	26	4	Jesus Hernandez	Fresno, Calif.	Chevrolet	150	
12	12	18	Marc Davis	Mitchelville, Md.	Chevrolet	150	
13	17	52	Jamie Hayes	Norlina, N.C.	Chevrolet	150	
14	25	63	John Salemi	Nashua, N.H.	Chevrolet	150	
15	6	35	Eric Holmes	Salida, Calif.	Chevrolet	150	
16	29	26	Scott Bouley	Wolcott, Conn.	Chevrolet	150	
17	13	43	Tim Schendel	Sparta, Wis.	Dodge	150	
18	28	30	Jeff Anton	Russell, Mass.	Chevrolet	150	
19	19	66	Chase Austin	Eudora, Kan.	Dodge	150	
20	15	58	Richard Gould	N. Brunswick, N.J.	Chevrolet	150	
21	4	40	Matt Kobyluck	Uncasville, Conn.	Chevrolet	148	
22	22	84	Dion Ciccarelli	Severn, Md.	Chevrolet	147	
23	9	91	Richard Jarvis Jr.	Ocean Pines, Md.	Chevrolet	146	
24	18	96	Mike Johnson	Salisbury, Mass.	Ford	144	
25	27	2	Max Dumarey	Gent, Belgium	Dodge	144	
26	14	21	Germán Quiroga	Mexico City, Mexico	Chevrolet	128	Accident
27	24	50	Todd Peck	Glendale, Penn.	Chevrolet	124	Accident
28	23	23	Casey Wyatt	Newport News, Va.	Chevrolet	114	Accident
29	30	24	Patrick Dupree	Saranac Lake, N.Y.	Dodge	114	Accident
30	10	22	Rubén Pardo	Mexico City, Mexico	Dodge	114	Accident
Fastest Qualifier: Joey Logano, 87.481 mph (140.787 km/h), 20.576 seconds
Time of Race: 1 hour 27 minutes 37 seconds
Margin of Victory: 4.595 seconds
Lead changes: 3 among 2 drivers
Cautions: 4 for 62 laps
Lap Leaders: S.Caisse 1-74; J.Logano 75-121; Caisse 122-122; Logano, 123-150

Did not Qualify: (8) Jonathan Cash (#59), Jonathan Smith (#5), Pierre Bourque (#7), James Pritchard Jr. (#41), Jeremy Clark (#25), Tim Cowen (#75), Glenn Sullivan (#15), Blair Addis (#8)

Notes: Logano's win in his first start in the series made him the first driver to repeat this feat since Kip Stockwell got his only win in his first start in the series at Thunder Road International SpeedBowl in 1997.

=== Minnesota 150 ===
The Minnesota 150 took place on May 18 at Elko Speedway in Elko, Minnesota. This race marked the first time that the East and West series would meet during the regular season for a points race. Sean Caisse took the pole and went on to win the race. Only he and fellow East series competitor Mike Olsen would lead the race.

Official Results
Finish	Start	Car #	Series	Driver	Hometown	Car	Laps	Reason Out
1	1	44	E	Sean Caisse	Pelham, N.H.	Chevrolet	156	
2	23	99	E	Bryon Chew	Mattituck, N.Y.	Chevrolet	156	
3	18	2	W	Mike David	Modesto, Calif.	Ford	156	
4	12	03	E	Rogelio López	Mexico City, Mexico	Chevrolet	156	
5	5	61	E	Mike Olsen	N. Haverhill, N.H.	Chevrolet	156	
6	11	83	E	Peyton Sellers	Danville, Va.	Chevrolet	156	
7	10	4	E	Jesus Hernandez	Fresno, Calif.	Chevrolet	156	
8	16	66	W	Justin Lofton	Westmorland, Calif.	Ford	156	
9	30	5	W	Eric Hardin	Anaheim, Calif.	Chevrolet	156	
10	19	37	E	Michelle Theriault	Bristol, Conn.	Chevrolet	156	
11	9	52	E	Jamie Hayes	Norlina, N.C.	Chevrolet	156	
12	17	40	E	Matt Kobyluck	Uncasville, Conn.	Chevrolet	156	
13	14	35	E	Eric Holmes	Salida, Calif.	Chevrolet	156	
14	29	30	E	Jeff Anton	Russell, Mass.	Chevrolet	156	
15	24	9	W	Mike Duncan	Bakersfield, Calif.	Chevrolet	156	
16	15	22	W	Jason Bowles	Ontario, Calif.	Ford	156	
17	7	43	E	Tim Schendel	Sparta, Wis.	Dodge	156	
18	26	54	W	Tim Woods III	Chino Hills, Calif.	Ford	156	
19	2	16	W	Brian Ickler	San Diego, Calif.	Chevrolet	156	
20	4	10	E	Joey Logano	Middletown, Conn.	Chevrolet	156	
21	27	32	E	Rubén Pardo	Mexico City, Mexico	Dodge	155	
22	25	51	E	Jonathan Smith	Beacon Falls, Conn.	Chevrolet	155	
23	28	8	W	Johnny Borneman III	Ramona, Calif.	Ford	154	
24	3	11	E	Jeffrey Earnhardt	Mooresville, N.C.	Chevrolet	145	Accident
25	8	92	E	Marc Davis	Mitchelville, Md.	Chevrolet	144	
26	22	88	W	Alex Haase	Las Vegas, Nev.	Chevrolet	108	
27	20	81	W	Brett Thompson	Jerome, Idaho	Chevrolet	67	Clutch
28	13	18	W	Moses Smith	Tempe, Ariz.	Chevrolet	50	Accident
29	21	14	W	Andrew Myers	Newport Beach, Calif.	Chevrolet	50	Accident
30	6	91	E	Richard Jarvis Jr.	Ocean Pines, Md.	Chevrolet	37	Engine
Fastest Qualifier: Sean Caisse, 95.440 mph (153.596 km/h), 14.145 Seconds
Time of Race: 1 hour 11 minutes 26 seconds
Margin of Victory: .305 seconds
Lead changes: 4 among 2 drivers
Cautions: 9 for 72 laps
Lap Leaders: S.Caisse 1-28; M.Olsen 29-41; S.Caisse 42-72; M.Olsen 73-103; S.Caisse 104-156

Did not Qualify: (16) Ryan Foster (#21W), John Salemi (#63E), Stan Silva Jr. (#65W), Eric Richardson (#20W), Jim Inglebright (#1W), Scott Bouley (#26E), Chase Austin (#64E), Dion Ciccarelli (#84E), Germán Quiroga (#12E), Lloyd Mack (#09W), Jack Sellers (#15W), Blair Addis (#3E), Daryl Harr (#71W), Jerick Johnson (76E), Mike Gallegos (#77W), Pierre Bourque (#7E)

Note: Both series would meet again 2 days later for the second and final combination race at Iowa Speedway

=== Featherlite Coaches 200 ===
The Featherlite Coaches 200 was run on May 5 at the Iowa Speedway in Newton, Iowa. This race, sponsored by Featherlite Coaches, was the second and final meeting between the East and West series during the regular season. Kevin Harvick was on hand to take part in the race. Harvick would narrowly take the pole over Joey Logano. These two drivers would proceed to swap the lead 15 times between the two of them. In the end, it would be Logano taking the win over the Nextel Cup star.

Official Results
Finish	Start	Car #	Series	Driver	Hometown	Car	Laps	Reason Out
1	2	10	E	Joey Logano	Middletown, Conn.	Chevrolet	200	
2	1	33	W	Kevin Harvick	Bakersfield, Calif.	Chevrolet	200	
3	23	4	E	Jesus Hernandez	Fresno, Calif.	Chevrolet	200	
4	37	8	W	Johnny Borneman III	Ramona, Calif.	Ford	200	
5	3	9	W	Mike Duncan	Bakersfield, Calif.	Chevrolet	200	
6	17	66	W	Justin Lofton	Westmorland, Calif.	Ford	200	
7	12	81	W	Brett Thompson	Jerome, Idaho	Chevrolet	200	
8	7	30	E	Jeff Anton	Russell, Mass.	Chevrolet	200	
9	18	20	W	Eric Richardson	Bakersfield, Calif.	Chevrolet	200	
10	31	31	W	Tim McCreadie	Watertown, N.Y.	Chevrolet	200	
11	33	21	W	Ryan Foster	Anderson, Calif.	Chevrolet	200	
12	11	63	E	John Salemi	Nashua, N.H.	Chevrolet	200	
13	19	6	W	David Mayhew	Atascadero, Calif.	Chevrolet	200	
14	27	51	E	Jonathan Smith	Beacon Falls, Conn.	Chevrolet	200	
15	39	5	W	Eric Hardin	Anaheim, Calif.	Chevrolet	200	
16	36	03	E	Rogelio López	Mexico City, Mexico	Chevrolet	200	
17	34	71	W	Daryl Harr	St. Albert, AB	Chevrolet	200	
18	32	11	E	Jeffrey Earnhardt	Mooresville, N.C.	Chevrolet	200	
19	8	16	W	Brian Ickler	San Diego, Calif.	Chevrolet	200	
20	24	2	W	Mike David	Modesto, Calif.	Ford	199	
21	42	57	E	John Freeman	Huntersville, N.C.	Chevrolet	199	
22	35	22	W	Jason Bowles	Ontario, Calif.	Ford	199	
23	28	1	W	Jim Inglebright	Fairfield, Calif.	Chevrolet	198	
24	40	84	E	Dion Ciccarelli	Severn, Md.	Chevrolet	198	
25	9	14	W	Andrew Myers	Newport Beach, Calif.	Chevrolet	197	
26	20	37	E	Michelle Theriault	Bristol, Conn.	Chevrolet	197	
27	41	88	W	Alex Haase	Las Vegas, Nev.	Chevrolet	197	
28	10	52	E	Jamie Hayes	Norlina, N.C.	Chevrolet	196	
29	29	61	E	Mike Olsen	N. Haverhill, N.H.	Chevrolet	192	
30	13	32	E	Rubén Pardo	Mexico City, Mexico	Dodge	175	
31	22	29	W	Scott Lynch	Burley, Idaho	Dodge	175	Accident
32	25	7	E	Pierre Bourque	Ottawa, Ont.	Dodge	171	Accident
33	14	46	W	Jeff Barkshire	Auburn, Wash.	Chevrolet	166	
34	5	92	E	Marc Davis	Mitchelville, Md.	Chevrolet	165	Vibration
35	26	91	E	Richard Jarvis Jr.	Ocean City, Md.	Chevrolet	150	Vibration
36	21	40	E	Matt Kobyluck	Uncasville, Conn.	Chevrolet	113	Accident
37	6	44	E	Sean Caisse	Pelham, N.H.	Chevrolet	94	Accident
38	16	35	E	Eric Holmes	Salida, Calif.	Chevrolet	76	Engine
39	38	99	E	Bryon Chew	Mattituck, N.Y.	Chevrolet	51	Clutch
40	4	83	E	Peyton Sellers	Danville, Va.	Chevrolet	51	Engine
41	30	43	E	Tim Schendel	Sparta, Wis.	Dodge	9	Accident
42	15	3	E	John Wes Townley	Watkinsville, Ga.	Chevrolet	3	Accident
Fastest Qualifier: Kevin Harvick, 133.775 mph (215.290 km/h), 23.547 seconds
Time of Race: 2 hours 10 minutes 8 seconds
Margin of Victory: 2.400 seconds
Lead changes: 18 among 4 drivers
Cautions: 10 for 68 laps
Lap Leaders: Harvick 1-38; Logano 39-41; Harvick 42-44; Logano 45-60; Harvick 61-85; Logano 86; Harvick 87-89; Logano 90; Harvick 91; Logano 92-101; Lofton 102-103; Duncan 104-130; Lofton 131-135; Harvick 136-162; Logano 163; Harvick 164-165; Logano 166-184; Harvick 185-193; Logano 194-200

Did not Qualify: (10) Chase Austin (68 E), Mike Gallegos (77 W), Stan Silva Jr. (65 W), Chris Bristol (12 E), Kyle Cattanach (59 W), Jerick Johnson (76 E), Scott Bouley (26 E), Tim Woods III (54 W), Jack Sellers (15 W), Trevor Bayne (00 E)

=== South Boston 150 ===
The South Boston 150 was run on June 2 at the South Boston Speedway in South Boston, Virginia. Peyton Sellers, who was the track's Late Model champion in 2005 en route to winning the NASCAR Whelen All-American Series title and also has a grandstand at the track named after him took the pole in qualifying. The race turned into a two-man race between Sellers and Matt Kobyluck swapping the lead for eleven of the twelve lead changes. Sellers lead a race high of 101 laps while Kobyluck lead 46. Sean Caisse would be the only other driver to lead during the race when he managed to jump into the lead for the first three laps. With restarts coming with 10 laps to go and again at 4 to go, Kobyluck was able to maintain the lead and go on to win his first race of the season.

Official Results
Finish	Start	Car #	Driver	Hometown	Car	Laps	Reason Out
1	4	40	Matt Kobyluck	Uncasville, Conn.	Chevrolet	150	
2	1	83	Peyton Sellers	Danville, Va.	Chevrolet	150	
3	3	20	Joey Logano	Middletown, Conn.	Chevrolet	150	
4	5	92	Marc Davis	Mitchelville, Md.	Chevrolet	150	
5	6	03	Rogelio López	Mexico City, Mexico	Chevrolet	150	
6	14	52	Jamie Hayes	Norlina, N.C.	Chevrolet	150	
7	8	61	Mike Olsen	N. Haverhill, N.H.	Chevrolet	150	
8	20	35	Eric Holmes	Salida, Calif.	Ford	150	
9	18	43	Tim Schendel	Sparta, Wis.	Dodge	150	
10	16	66	Chase Austin	Eudora, Kan.	Dodge	150	
11	10	91	Richard Jarvis Jr.	Ocean City, Md.	Chevrolet	150	
12	19	30	Jeff Anton	Russell, Mass.	Chevrolet	150	
13	11	99	Bryon Chew	Mattituck, N.Y.	Chevrolet	150	
14	15	42	Landon Cassill	Charlotte, N.C.	Chevrolet	150	
15	9	58	Ben Stancill	Ayden, N.C.	Chevrolet	150	
16	25	22	Rubén Pardo	Mexico City, Mexico	Dodge	150	
17	12	84	Dion Ciccarelli	Severn, Md.	Chevrolet	150	
18	17	5	Jonathan Smith	Beacon Falls, Conn.	Chevrolet	150	
19	32	25	Jeremy Clark	Concord, N.C.	Chevrolet	150	
20	21	1	Jeffrey Earnhardt	Mooresville, N.C.	Chevrolet	150	
21	23	63	John Salemi	Nashua, N.H.	Chevrolet	149	
22	30	50	Todd Peck	Glenville, Pa.	Chevrolet	148	
23	27	28	A. J. Lane	Carleton, Mich.	Ford	147	
24	26	26	Scott Bouley	Wolcott, Conn.	Chevrolet	147	
25	22	16	Max Dumarey	Gent, Belgium	Chevrolet	147	
26	28	21	Chris Bristol	Columbus, Ohio	Chevrolet	146	
27	2	44	Sean Caisse	Pelham, N.H.	Chevrolet	144	
28	31	41	James Pritchard Jr.	Wharton, N.J.	Chevrolet	139	
29	24	59	Jonathan Cash	Oxford, N.C.	Ford	139	
30	29	3	Blair Addis	Greenville, S.C.	Chevrolet	137	
31	7	4	Jesus Hernandez	Fresno, Calif.	Chevrolet	133	
32	13	37	Michelle Theriault	Bristol, Conn.	Chevrolet	117	
Fastest Qualifier: Peyton Sellers, 92.414 mph (148.726 km/h), 15.582 seconds
Time of Race: 1 hour 13 minutes 15 seconds
Margin of Victory: 0.411 seconds
Lead changes: 12 among 3 drivers
Cautions: 8 for 52 laps
Lap Leaders: Caisse 1-3; Sellers 4-20; Kobyluck 21-30; Sellers 31-66; Kobyluck 67; Sellers 68-82; Kobyluck 83-99; Sellers 100-102; Kobyluck 103; Sellers 104; Kobyluck 105-110; Sellers 111-139; Kobyluck 140-150

Did not Qualify: None

=== TSI Harley-Davidson 150 ===
The TSI Harley-Davidson 150 took place on June 6 at Stafford Motor Speedway in Stafford, Connecticut. Sean Caisse would sit on the pole for the first time this season, but it would be Eddie MacDonald, who was making his first start of the season that would go on to take the win in grand fashion by leading the final 81 laps.

Official Results
Finish	Start	Car #	Driver	Hometown	Car	Laps	Reason Out
1	5	48	Eddie MacDonald	Rowley, Mass.	Chevrolet	150	
2	8	61	Mike Olsen	N. Haverhill, N.H.	Chevrolet	150	
3	2	40	Matt Kobyluck	Uncasville, Conn.	Chevrolet	150	
4	9	18	Marc Davis	Mitchelville, Md.	Chevrolet	150	
5	4	99	Bryon Chew	Mattituck, N.Y.	Chevrolet	150	
6	13	4	Jesus Hernandez	Fresno, Calif.	Chevrolet	150	
7	11	96	Mike Johnson	Salisbury, Mass.	Ford	150	
8	10	66	Chase Austin	Eudora, Kan.	Dodge	150	
9	22	63	John Salemi	Nashua, N.H.	Chevrolet	150	
10	15	2	John Freeman	Charlotte, N.C.	Dodge	150	
11	6	20	Joey Logano	Middletown, Conn.	Chevrolet	150	
12	20	1	Jeffrey Earnhardt	Mooresville, N.C.	Chevrolet	150	
13	25	26	Scott Bouley	Wolcott, Conn.	Chevrolet	150	
14	3	83	Peyton Sellers	Danville, Va.	Chevrolet	150	
15	16	22	Rubén Pardo	Mexico City, Mexico	Dodge	150	
16	12	52	Jamie Hayes	Norlina, N.C.	Chevrolet	149	
17	27	03	Rogelio López	Mexico City, Mexico	Ford	149	
18	18	30	Jeff Anton	Russell, Mass.	Chevrolet	149	
19	7	35	Eric Holmes	Salida, Calif.	Ford	149	
20	24	84	Dion Ciccarelli	Severn, Md.	Chevrolet	149	
21	26	16	Max Dumarey	Gent, Belgium	Chevrolet	148	
22	19	5	Jonathan Smith	Beacon Falls, Conn.	Chevrolet	146	
23	14	91	Richard Jarvis Jr.	Ocean City, Md.	Chevrolet	132	Fuel Pump
24	1	44	Sean Caisse	Pelham, N.H.	Chevrolet	132	
25	17	37	Michelle Theriault	Bristol, Conn.	Chevrolet	115	
26	21	43	Tim Schendel	Sparta, Wis.	Dodge	109	Brakes
27	29	15	Glenn Sullivan	Westbury, N.Y.	Chevrolet	90	Brakes
28	23	21	Germán Quiroga	Mexico City, Mexico	Chevrolet	78	Rear End
29	28	41	James Pritchard Jr.	Wharton, N.J.	Chevrolet	71	
30	30	85	Rob Humphreys	Elbridge, N.Y.	Chevrolet	53	Overheating
Fastest Qualifier: Sean Caisse, 91.963 mph (148.000 km/h), 19.573 seconds
Time of Race: 1 hour 12 minutes 36 seconds
Margin of Victory: 1.236 seconds
Lead changes: 4 among 4 drivers
Cautions: 5 for 31 laps
Lap Leaders: S.Caisse 1-30; M.Kobyluck 31-37; P.Sellers 38; M.Kobyluck 39-69; E.MacDonald 70-150

Did not Qualify: None

=== New England 125 ===
The New England 125 took place on June 6 at New Hampshire International Speedway in Loudon, New Hampshire. Joey Logano took the pole and went on to lead the most laps en route to his third win of the series. Series veteran Brad Leighton was in contention until he was deemed to have jumped the final restart leading to a green-white-checkered finish and subsequently was black flagged. Rather than risk disqualification, Leighton gave the lead back to Logano and would have to settle for a second-place finish.

Official Results
Finish	Start	Car #	Driver	Hometown	Car	Laps	Reason Out
1	1	20	Joey Logano	Middletown, Conn.	Chevrolet	126	
2	11	55	Brad Leighton	Center Harbor, N.H.	Chevrolet	126	
3	26	43	Tim Schendel	Sparta, Wis.	Dodge	126	
4	6	42	Landon Cassill	Charlotte, N.C.	Chevrolet	126	
5	14	45	Brian Hoar	Williston, Vt.	Dodge	126	
6	13	40	Matt Kobyluck	Uncasville, Conn.	Chevrolet	126	
7	24	31	James Buescher	Plano, Texas	Chevrolet	126	
8	18	22	Rubén Pardo	Mexico City, Mexico	Dodge	126	
9	4	83	Peyton Sellers	Danville, Va.	Chevrolet	126	
10	25	52	Jamie Hayes	Norlina, N.C.	Chevrolet	126	
11	16	61	Mike Olsen	N. Haverhill, N.H.	Chevrolet	126	
12	3	2	Josh Wise	Riverside, Calif.	Dodge	126	
13	23	37	Michelle Theriault	Bristol, Conn.	Chevrolet	126	
14	22	30	Jeff Anton	Russell, Mass.	Chevrolet	126	
15	42	1	Jeffrey Earnhardt	Mooresville, N.C.	Chevrolet	126	
16	29	14	Joe Masessa	Franklin Lakes, N.J.	Chevrolet	126	
17	27	88	Mike Gallo	Saco, Maine	Ford	126	
18	30	63	John Salemi	Nashua, N.H.	Chevrolet	126	
19	34	26	Scott Bouley	Wolcott, Conn.	Chevrolet	126	
20	8	57	John Freeman	Charlotte, N.C.	Chevrolet	126	
21	35	41	James Pritchard Jr.	Wharton, N.J.	Chevrolet	126	
22	41	84	Dion Ciccarelli	Severn, Md.	Chevrolet	126	
23	19	4	Jesus Hernandez	Fresno, Calif.	Chevrolet	126	
24	2	44	Sean Caisse	Pelham, N.H.	Chevrolet	126	
25	39	24	Patrick Dupree	Saranac Lake, N.Y.	Dodge	125	
26	38	96	Mike Johnson	Salisbury, Mass.	Ford	123	
27	28	16	Max Dumarey	Gent, Belgium	Chevrolet	121	
28	10	18	Marc Davis	Mitchelville, Md.	Chevrolet	120	Accident
29	17	47	Kelly Moore	Scarborough, Maine	Chevrolet	120	Accident
30	36	50	Todd Peck	Glenville, Penn.	Chevrolet	118	Accident
31	37	13	Garrett Liberty	Jonesboro, Ga.	Chevrolet	110	Accident
32	15	66	Chase Austin	Eudora, Kan.	Dodge	104	Accident
33	32	21	Germán Quiroga	Mexico City, Mexico	Chevrolet	103	Accident
34	33	5	Jonathan Smith	Beacon Falls, Conn.	Chevrolet	94	Accident
35	21	06	Ryan Seaman	Toms River, N.J.	Chevrolet	68	Accident
36	12	33	Tim McCreadie	Watertown, N.Y.	Chevrolet	68	Accident
37	40	25	Jeremy Clark	Concord, N.C.	Chevrolet	66	Radiator
38	20	35	Eric Holmes	Salida, Calif.	Chevrolet	56	Accident
39	31	15	Glenn Sullivan	Westbury, N.Y.	Chevrolet	51	Suspension
40	9	99	Bryon Chew	Mattituck, N.Y.	Chevrolet	31	Engine
41	7	48	Eddie MacDonald	Rowley, Mass.	Chevrolet	28	Suspension
42	43	28	A. J. Lane	Carleton, Mich.	Ford	24	Handling
43	5	03	Rogelio López	Mexico City, Mexico	Chevrolet	15	Fire
Fastest Qualifier: Joey Logano, 125.294 mph (201.641 km/h), 30.399 seconds
2 hours 0 minutes 55 seconds
Margin of Victory: 0.430 seconds
Lead changes: Logano 61, Leighton 48, Holmes 7, Buescher 6, Sellers 4. 9 changes among 4 drivers
Cautions: 10 for 64 laps
Lap Leaders: S.Caisse 1-30; M.Kobyluck 31-37; P.Sellers 38; M.Kobyluck 39-69; E.MacDonald 70-150

Did not Qualify: None

=== Pepsi Racing 100 ===
The Pepsi Racing 100 was run on July 14, at Thompson International Speedway in Thompson, CT. Sean Caisse would sit on the pole and nearly lead flag to flag in the race that was extended to 108 laps due to late race cautions that required two green-white-checkered attempts to end the race. Caisse only relinquished the lead for two laps en route to his second win of the season, breaking a four race streak of bad luck.

Official Results
Finish	Start	Car #	Driver	Hometown	Car	Laps	Reason Out
1	1	44	Sean Caisse	Pelham, N.H.	Chevrolet	108	
2	12	40	Matt Kobyluck	Uncasville, Conn.	Chevrolet	108	
3	7	61	Mike Olsen	N. Haverhill, N.H.	Chevrolet	108	
4	13	55	Brad Leighton	Center Harbor, N.H.	Chevrolet	108	
5	4	20	Joey Logano #	Middletown, Conn.	Chevrolet	108	
6	8	31	James Buescher	Plano, Texas	Chevrolet	108	
7	9	22	Rubén Pardo	Mexico City, Mexico	Dodge	108	
8	15	99	Bryon Chew	Mattituck, N.Y.	Chevrolet	108	
9	11	35	Eric Holmes	Salida, Calif.	Ford	108	
10	20	30	Jeff Anton	Russell, Mass.	Chevrolet	108	
11	19	63	John Salemi	Nashua, N.H.	Chevrolet	108	
12	5	83	Peyton Sellers	Danville, Va.	Chevrolet	108	
13	30	39	Dustin Delaney	Mayfield, Conn.	Chevrolet	108	
14	10	1	Jeffrey Earnhardt #	Mooresville, N.C.	Chevrolet	108	
15	25	11	Laine Chase	Beverly, Mass.	Chevrolet	108	
16	3	71	Eddie MacDonald	Rowley, Mass.	Chevrolet	108	
17	23	16	Max Dumarey	Gent, Belgium	Chevrolet	108	
18	6	4	Jesus Hernandez #	Fresno, Calif.	Chevrolet	108	
19	18	84	Dion Ciccarelli	Severn, Md.	Chevrolet	107	
20	28	21	Chris Bristol	Columbus, Ohio	Chevrolet	107	
21	21	5	Jonathan Smith #	Beacon Falls, Conn.	Chevrolet	107	
22	22	96	Mike Johnson	Salisbury, Mass.	Ford	107	
23	16	37	Michelle Theriault #	Bristol, Conn.	Chevrolet	106	
24	29	15	Glenn Sullivan	Westbury, N.Y.	Chevrolet	100	
25	14	66	Chase Austin	Emporia, Kan.	Dodge	99	
26	17	03	Rogelio López	Aquascalientes, Mexico	Chevrolet	91	
27	24	52	Jamie Hayes	Norlina, N.C.	Chevrolet	40	Overheating
28	2	18	Marc Davis	Mitchelville, Md.	Chevrolet	33	Accident
29	26	41	James Pritchard Jr.	Wharton, N.J.	Chevrolet	25	Accident
30	27	26	Scott Bouley	Wolcott, Conn.	Chevrolet	25	Rear End
Fastest Qualifier: Sean Caisse, 109.508 mph (176.236 km/h), 20.382 seconds
Time of Race: 1 hour 2 minutes 43 seconds
Margin of Victory: .328 seconds
Laps Lead: S. Caisse 106; M. Davis 1; M. Kobyluck 1.
Lead changes: 3 changes involving 3 drivers
Cautions: 9 for 47 laps
Lap Leaders: M.Davis 1; S.Caisse 2-91; M.Kobyluck 92; S.Caisse 93-108.

Did not Qualify: (1) Rob Humphreys (#85)

=== Music City 150 ===
- Coming Soon

=== The Edge Hotel 150 ===
The 2007 The Edge Hotel 150 was a Busch East Series (now K & N Pro Series East) event held at Adirondack International Speedway on July 28, 2007. Joey Logano pulled out an impossible victory, making a last lap squeeze pass between leader Bryon Chew and the spinning car of Rogelio Lopez to pull out his fourth victory of the year, leading just the last quarter lap. Logano continued to pull far far away in the points, now 192 makers ahead of Matt Kobyluck.

=== Mohegan Sun NASCAR Busch East 200 ===
- Coming Soon

=== Mansfield 150 ===
- Coming Soon

=== Aubuchon Hardware 125 presented by hardwarestore.com ===
- Coming Soon

=== Sunoco 150 ===
- Coming Soon

== Points Standings ==
There are the final points standings for the 2007 season.

Official Results
Pos	Car #	Driver	Total	Att	Starts	Poles	Wins	Top5s	Top10s	DNFs
1	20	Joey Logano	2123	13	13	2	5	10	10	
2	44	Sean Caisse	1957	13	13	5	4	8	8	1
3	83	Peyton Sellers	1862	13	13	1		4	9	1
4	40	Matt Kobyluck	1840	13	13	1	2	5	7	3
5	1	Jeffrey Earnhardt	1736	13	13	1		4	5	2
6	61	Mike Olsen	1721	13	13			3	6	2
7	03	Rogelio López	1671	13	13	1	1	5	5	1
8	52	Jamie Hayes	1661	13	13			1	5	2
9	18	Marc Davis	1654	13	13			4	6	4
10	30	Jeff Anton	1630	13	13			1	4	
11	99	Bryon Chew	1603	13	13			4	6	3
12	4	Jesus Hernandez	1495	12	12			3	5	1
13	37	Michelle Theriault	1434	13	13				2	1
14	63	John Salemi	1416	13	12				1	2
15	66	Chase Austin	1322	13	11				4	1
16	5	Jonathan Smith	1286	13	12					4
17	22	Rubén Pardo	1278	11	11				3	2
18	84	Dion Ciccarelli	1262	13	12				1	3
19	16	Max Dumarey	1134	11	11				2	1
20	26	Scott Bouley	1066	13	11					1
21	48	Eddie MacDonald	988	8	8		1	2	3	1
22	43	Tim Schendel	847	7	7			1	2	2
23	35	Jerry Marquis	847	6	6				3	
24	2	John Freeman	843	7	7				2	1
25	35	Eric Holmes	798	7	7			1	3	2
26	41	James Pritchard Jr.	789	10	9				1	2
27	96	Mike Johnson	655	6	6				1	
28	31	James Buescher	569	4	4				4	
29	91	Richard Jarvis Jr.	542	5	5					3
30	55	Brad Leighton	481	3	3			2	3	
31	21	Germán Quiroga	408	6	5					5
32	50	Todd Peck	392	5	5					3
33	58	Richard Gould	367	3	3				1	
34	21	Chris Bristol	310	4	3					1
35	25	Jeremy Clark	307	4	3					1
36	15	Glenn Sullivan	299	5	4					2
37	42	Landon Cassill	281	2	2			1	1	
38	21	Antonio Pérez	264	3	3					1
39	85	Rob Humphreys	259	4	3					2
40	24	Patrick Dupree	243	3	3					1
41	39	Dustin Delaney	233	2	2					
42	3	John Wes Townley	228	2	2				1	1
43	9	Tim Andrews	227	2	2				1	1
44	76	Jason Cochran	221	2	2					1
45	33	Tim McCreadie	210	2	2			1	1	1
46	91	Ben Stancill	209	2	2					1
47	11	Laine Chase	206	2	2					
48	15	Brian Ickler	206	2	2					1
49	14	Joe Massessa	201	3	3					
50	7	Pierre Bourque	181	4	2					1
51	3	Jeffrey Oakley	179	2	2					1
52	3	Stephen Berry	179	2	2					
53	47	Kelly Moore	158	2	2					1
54	45	Brian Hoar	155	1	1			1	1	
55	06	Ryan Seaman	152	2	2					2
56	74	Ryan Moore	142	1	1				1	
57	53	Steve Park	142	1	1				1	
58	88	Larry Moloney	134	1	1				1	
59	28	A. J. Lane	131	2	2					1
60	75	Tim Cowen	129	3	1					1
61	2	Josh Wise	127	1	1					
62	3	Nicholas Formosa	118	1	1					
63	88	Mike Gallo	112	1	1					
64	23	Casey Wyatt	110	2	1					1
65	59	Jonathan Cash	107	2	1					
66	00	Trevor Bayne	104	2	1					1
67	28	Kevin Leicht	103	1	1					
68	81	Mark McFarland	102	1	1					
69	8	Skip McCord	100	1	1					
70	3	Blair Addis	99	3	1					
71	76	Jerick Johnson	87	3	1					
72	05	Guy Pavageau	79	1	1					1
73	13	Garrett Liberty	70	1	1					1
74	29	Scott Lynch	61	1	1					1

== See also ==
- 2007 NASCAR Nextel Cup Series
- 2007 NASCAR Busch Series
- 2007 NASCAR Craftsman Truck Series
- 2007 ARCA Re/Max Series
- 2007 NASCAR Whelen Modified Tour
- 2007 NASCAR Whelen Southern Modified Tour
- 2007 NASCAR Canadian Tire Series
- 2007 NASCAR Corona Series
