= Seekonk Speedway =

Racetrack

"The Cement Palace", "The Action Track of the East", "The Fast Track to Family Fun", "The House of Pain"
- Logo of Seekonk Speedway

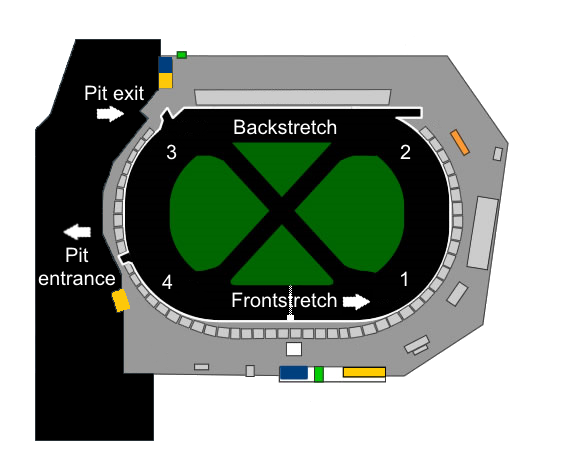
- Track map of Seekonk Speedway
- Location: Seekonk, Massachusetts
- Coordinates: 41°47′04″N 71°18′08″W
- Capacity: 10,000
- Owner: Venditti Family
- Operator: Francis Venditti and David Alburn
- Broke ground: 1945
- Opened: 30 May 1946; 80 years ago
- Architect: D. Anthony Venditti
- Major events: Current: Northeastern Midget Association; Boston Louie Memorial (1997–2001, 2005–2019, 2021–present); NASCAR Whelen Modified Tour (1987, 2000–2002, 2004–2005, 2016–2019, 2023–present); American Canadian Tour (1983–1985, 2006–2007, 2016–2017, 2021–present); Former: U.S. Pro Stock/Super Late Model Championship (2016–2018); NASCAR Busch North Series (1987, 2000–2004)

1/3 Mile Paved Oval (1980–present)
- Surface: Asphalt
- Length: 0.333 mi (0.536 km)
- Turns: 4
- Banking: 7 feet (6°)

1/3 Mile Paved Figure 8 Course (c.1958–present; ramps added in 1980)
- Surface: Asphalt
- Length: 0.333 mi (0.536 km)
- Turns: 4

1/4 Mile Paved Oval (1946–1979)
- Surface: Asphalt
- Length: 0.250 mi (0.402 km)

Seekonk Speedway is a family entertainment venue that features racing of all kinds on a semi-banked 1/3 mile asphalt-paved oval, located on U.S. Route 6 in Seekonk, Massachusetts.

The track holds the distinction of being the longest continually operated family-owned race track in the United States, under the guidance of the Venditti family since it opened on May 30, 1946. The track is sanctioned by NASCAR under the Whelen All-American Series. It is also the widest track in New England at 72 feet. The track's all-time winningest drivers include George Summers and "Radical" Rick Martin of Westport, Massachusetts. Typically starting on the first Sunday of May, Seekonk Speedway is host to short track racing every Saturday night, depending on the weather. On Friday nights, Seekonk Speedway is open for lower-budget competition, to drivers of varying skills. The facility has seating all around, allowing patrons to see the whole track from any seat. Optional pit passes are available for sale which allow patrons to enter the paddock area to meet the drivers and see their cars.

== History ==
Opened in 1946, Seekonk Speedway has hosted stock car racing from its inception. Construction of the track was started by Dominic Anthony Venditti in 1945, following the post-war racing boom. The track was built with midgets in mind, as a 0.250 mi (0.402 km) paved oval. Along with midgets, the track branched out to modifieds as the staple of racing for nearly twenty years. Venditti had his own vision for the future of auto racing in the United States, and he used his track to promote that vision. In 1980, the track was expanded to a 0.333 mi (0.536 km) oval. Midgets and modifieds dominated racing at Seekonk Speedway, until the predecessors to the late models were introduced. The track has not only hosted stock car racing, however. The track has been flooded at least once for boat races to take place within its walls.

Modifieds and midgets were a track staple until 1987, when they were completely phased out of weekly racing. Along with the modifieds were a division that lasted from 1982 to 1987, called the "mini modifieds". Venditti had introduced the division formerly known as the "all-pro division" after a visit to the mid-west, where he received inspiration for a series similar to modern-day super late models, with the intent of replacing the modifieds. For 1978 only, the all-pro division raced with the cadet division (Now known as late models), with a flag on the trunks of the all-pro division cars to differentiate them. The all-pro division became its own division in 1979, and had their name changed to "pro stocks" mid-season. In 1984, the pro stocks replaced the modifieds as the headlining division at Seekonk Speedway. The track claims to have created the division known universally as "super late models", but the claim is widely disputed. Preceding the pro stocks, however, are the track's late models, which have been racing at the track since 1960. The late models were introduced to the speedway in 1960 under the name of the "charger class". The charger class was eventually renamed the "cadet division", also known as the "late model cadets". In 1978, the cadet division was renamed again, to "late models", but the name was changed back to "cadet division" the following year. For 1980 to 1989 the name had once again been changed, this time back to "charger class". In 1990 the charger class had another name change, this time being named the "late model sportsmen". This name was used until 2003, when sportsman was dropped, leaving the name as "late models". In 2010, the late models had their rules changed so that they would conform to American Canadian Tour late model rules. This allows Seekonk late model drivers to travel to any ACT race they want and race, and also allows any ACT competitor to travel to Seekonk and race.

Street stock racing at Seekonk Speedway was introduced in 1971, for one season. They would later return to the track from 1974 through 1980, taking yet another hiatus at the end of the 1980 racing season. In 1985 however, the street stocks were brought back to Seekonk, and have been racing weekly ever since. The street stock division was introduced as a cheap way to get into racing. The cars ran stock chassis from American made cars, keeping the cost of racing down for its competitors. At the end of the 2016 racing season, the street stocks had their name changed to the sportsmen, per request of the division's new sponsorship. In 1995, Seekonk Speedway introduced a division named the sport trucks. The trucks were introduced as a secondary introduction division to Saturday night racing at the track, the other division being the sportsmen. The current trucks at the track are similar in appearance to Camping World Truck Series trucks, but are down-scaled and far less powerful.

== Saturday Night NASCAR ==
=== Racing ===
Saturday night starting at 6PM EST, Seekonk Speedway hosts weekly Saturday Night NASCAR racing under the banner of the Whelen All-American Series, allowing its weekly competitors to fight point battles on the national scale against tracks from all corners of the country. Phil's Propane has signed aboard to sponsor 12 races per year, three per division, in what is called the Phil's Propane Triple Crown Series. Victory lane is sponsored by Everett's Auto Parts, who also sponsor the late model division at the track. Caution flags do not count towards the race total at Seekonk Speedway, except during a touring race in which the series dictates caution laps to count towards the race total.

Racing is split into heat races and feature races. Sport trucks, sportsmen, and late models run 10 lap heat races, while the pro stocks run 12 lap heat races. The top five finishers in each heat race receive points, 5 for first, 4 for second, etc. Sport trucks and sportsmen run 25 lap feature races, and during the Triple Crown Series races run 35 lap feature races. Late models run 30 lap feature races, and during the Triple Crown Series races run 50 lap feature races. Pro stocks run 40 lap feature races, and during the Triple Crown Series races run 65 lap feature races, except for the first Triple Crown race every year, which is 75 laps in memorial to Brad Scott.

=== NASCAR divisions ===
==== Division 1 ====
Division 1 of NASCAR Whelen All-American Series racing at Seekonk Speedway is the pro stocks, also known as super late models at many other tracks. The pro stocks at Seekonk Speedway run either a tube frame chassis or straight rail chassis on 10-inch American Racer racing slicks. The engines are 358 cubic inch crate engines sold by General Motors and Ford Motor Company, generating 400-450 horsepower. Many different body styles of cars are allowed to compete at the track, including (Chevy) Camaro and Impala, (Ford) Mustang and Fusion, (Dodge) Charger and Challenger, (Oldsmobile) Cutlass, (Pontiac) Grand Prix, and (Toyota) Camry. All bodies are made of fiberglass. Use of a General Motors crate engine allows a minimum weight of 2,775 pounds, use of a Ford crate engine allows a minimum weight of 2,800 pounds, and use of an open engine (one built by the competitor's team) allows a minimum weight of 2,825 pounds. A maximum of 56% left side weight is enforced with all tube frame chassis cars, while straight rail chassis cars are allowed only 55%. All weights are measured with driver.

Before every pro stock race, "Stranglehold" by Ted Nugent is played over the loudspeakers.

==== Division 2 ====
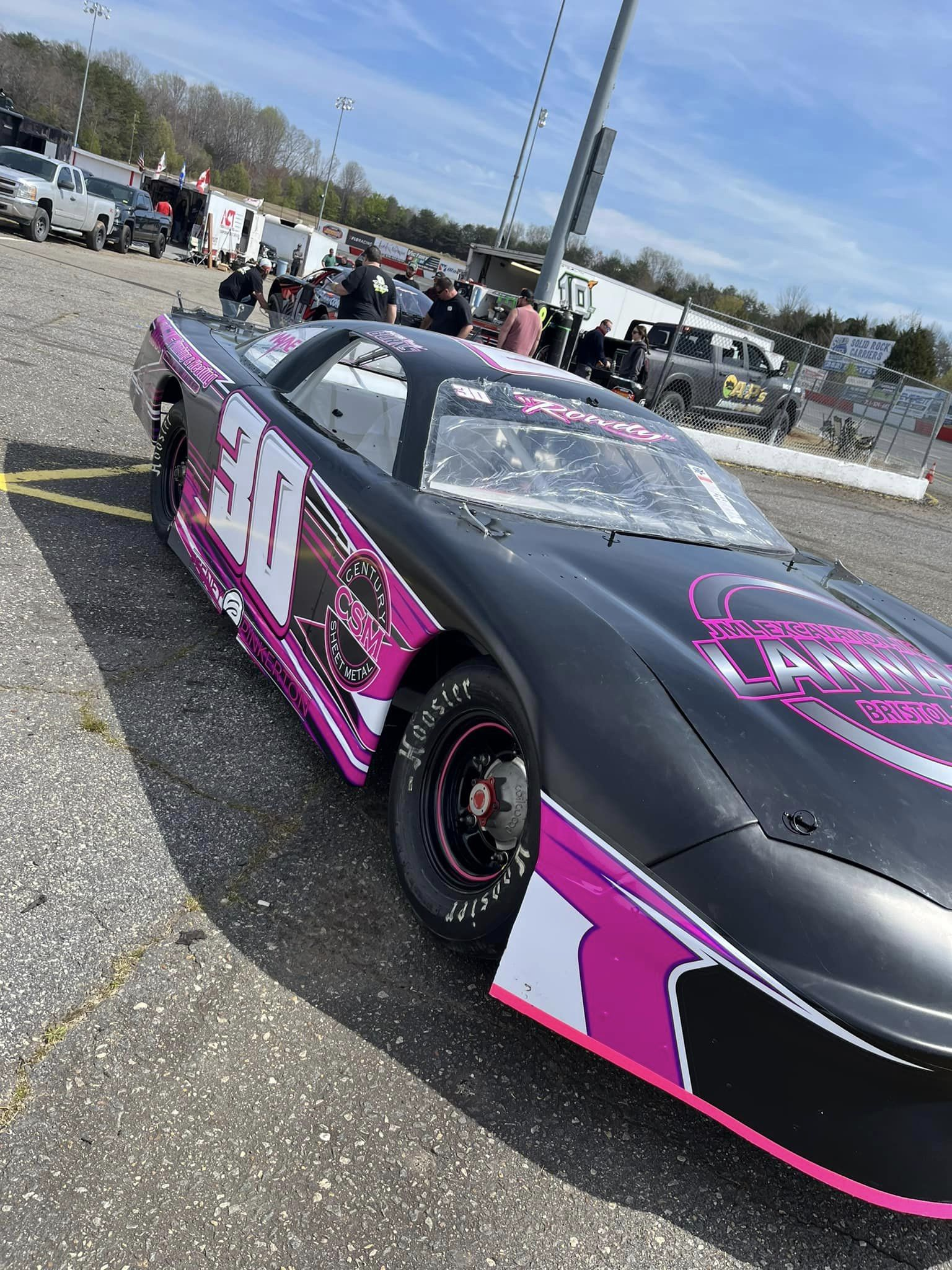
Jacob "Rowdy" Burns’ Late Model

Division 2 of NASCAR Whelen All-American Series racing at Seekonk Speedway is the late models. The late models at Seekonk Speedway run with rules that are nearly identical to the late model rules set by ACT. The late models run a tube frame chassis on 8-inch American Racer racing slicks. The engines are 358 cubic inch crate engines sold by General Motors and Ford Motor Company, generating 350-370 horsepower. Many different body styles of cars are allowed to compete, including (Chevrolet) Monte Carlo and Impala, (Dodge) Charger, (Pontiac) Grand Prix, (Ford) Taurus, and (Toyota) Camry. All bodies are made of fiberglass, generally with steel quarter panels. The minimum weight of all cars is 2,775 pounds including driver, with a maximum of 57% left side weight.

Before every late model race, "Fuel" by Metallica is played over the loudspeakers.

==== Division 3 ====
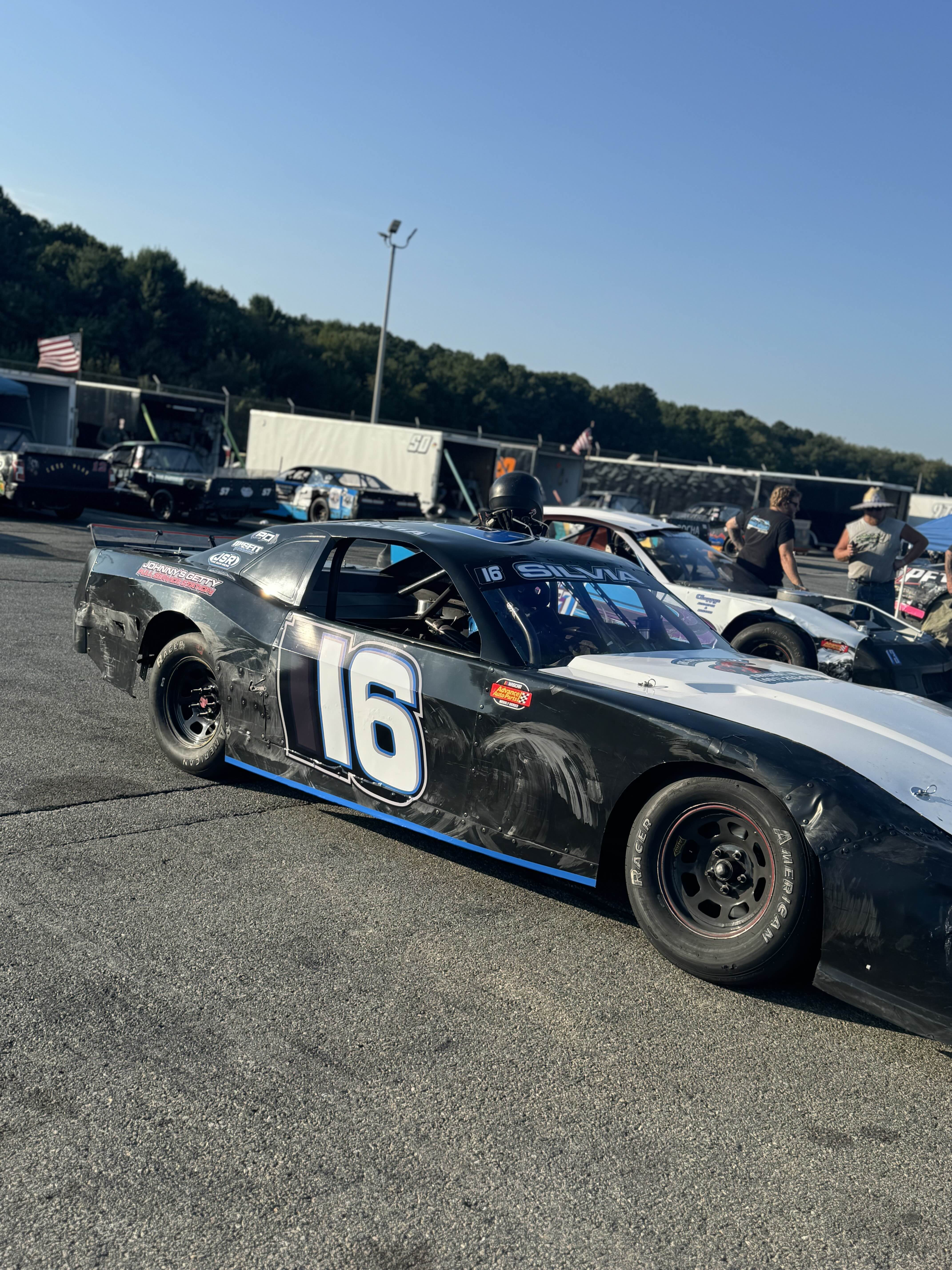
Jimmy "Pepe" Silvia's Sportsman

Division 3 of NASCAR Whelen All-American Series racing at Seekonk Speedway is the sportsmen. The sportsmen at Seekonk Speedway run any stock American-made chassis made from 1970 to the late 1980s on 7-inch American Racer treaded racing slicks. The engines are 358 cubic inch General Motors and Ford engines and 366 cubic inch Chrysler engines, with the option of running a crate engine, generating 300-350 horsepower. There is a large variety of car body styles allowed to compete, with any car body made in America from 1970 to 1988 allowed. All bodies are required to be made of aluminum or steel. Weight rules are set only on the right side of the cars, with a minimum ride side weight of 1,400 pounds including driver.

Before every sportsman race, "Flirtin' with Disaster" by Molly Hatchet is played over the loudspeakers.

==== Division 4 ====
Division 4 of NASCAR Whelen All-American Series racing at Seekonk Speedway is the sport trucks. Sport trucks at Seekonk Speedway run 25-lap races. The sport trucks at Seekonk Speedway run a stock chassis from the options of Ford Ranger, Chevrolet S-10, GMC Sonoma, Nissan Frontier, and Toyota Tacoma on 7-inch Hoosier treaded racing slicks. The trucks at Seekonk Speedway have the option of running a four-cylinder or eight-cylinder engine. Four-cylinder engines are limited to 2,300 cubic centimeters (Ford), 2,400 cubic centimeters (Toyota and Nissan) and 2,500 cubic centimeters (Chevrolet). Eight-cylinder engines have the option of running a General Motors crate engine, or running a Chevrolet 305, Ford 302, or Dodge 318 engine. All bodies are required to be made of steel sheet metal. Twenty-three hundred CC engine trucks have a minimum weight of 2,400 pounds, 2,400 CC engines 2,450 pounds, 2,500 CC engines 2,550 pounds, and all V8 trucks have a minimum weight of 2,850 pounds. All weights are measured with driver, with a maximum left side weight for four-cylinder engines being 55% and eight-cylinder engines being 56%.

Before every sport truck race, "Wild Side" by Mötley Crüe is played over the loudspeakers.

== Open Wheel Wednesday ==
Since 2005, Seekonk has featured an exclusively open-wheel program on one Wednesday of the summer. The event features racing from the NEMA lights and midgets, as well as the 100 lap $10,000 to win Tri Track Modified Series race. The two NEMA races are the most prestigious races for each series, as Open Wheel Wednesday headlines as the Boston Louie Memorial for NEMA.

=== Modifieds ===
Modified racing during Open Wheel Wednesday takes stage with 4+ 12 lap heat races, with usually the top four or five drivers guaranteed entrance to the 100 lap race. Drivers who do not qualify for the race run 12 lap consolation races, with the top 3 or 4 in each race moving on to the B-Main. The B-Main race is a 25 lap race, with the winner either taking a $1,000 prize or taking the last starting position in the 100 lap race. The rule book for the Tri Track Modified Series is similar to the NASCAR Whelen Modified Tour and Valenti Modified Racing Series modifieds, allowing competitors from both series participate in the Tri Track races with minimal modifications. The winner of the 100 lap modified race takes home the grand prize of $10,000, and positions 16-26 taking home a prize of $800. Past winners include Doug Coby and Matt Hirschman.

=== NEMA Lights and Midgets ===
NEMA racing at Seekonk for the Boston Louie Memorial takes stage with 2+ 10 lap heat races. All drivers who qualify are eligible for their division's race (NEMA Light or Midget). There are a wide variety of engines usable in NEMA competition, ranging from 140 CI DOHC inline 4 engines to 195 CI push rod Mopar inline 4 engines.

== Fast Friday Series ==
=== Racing ===
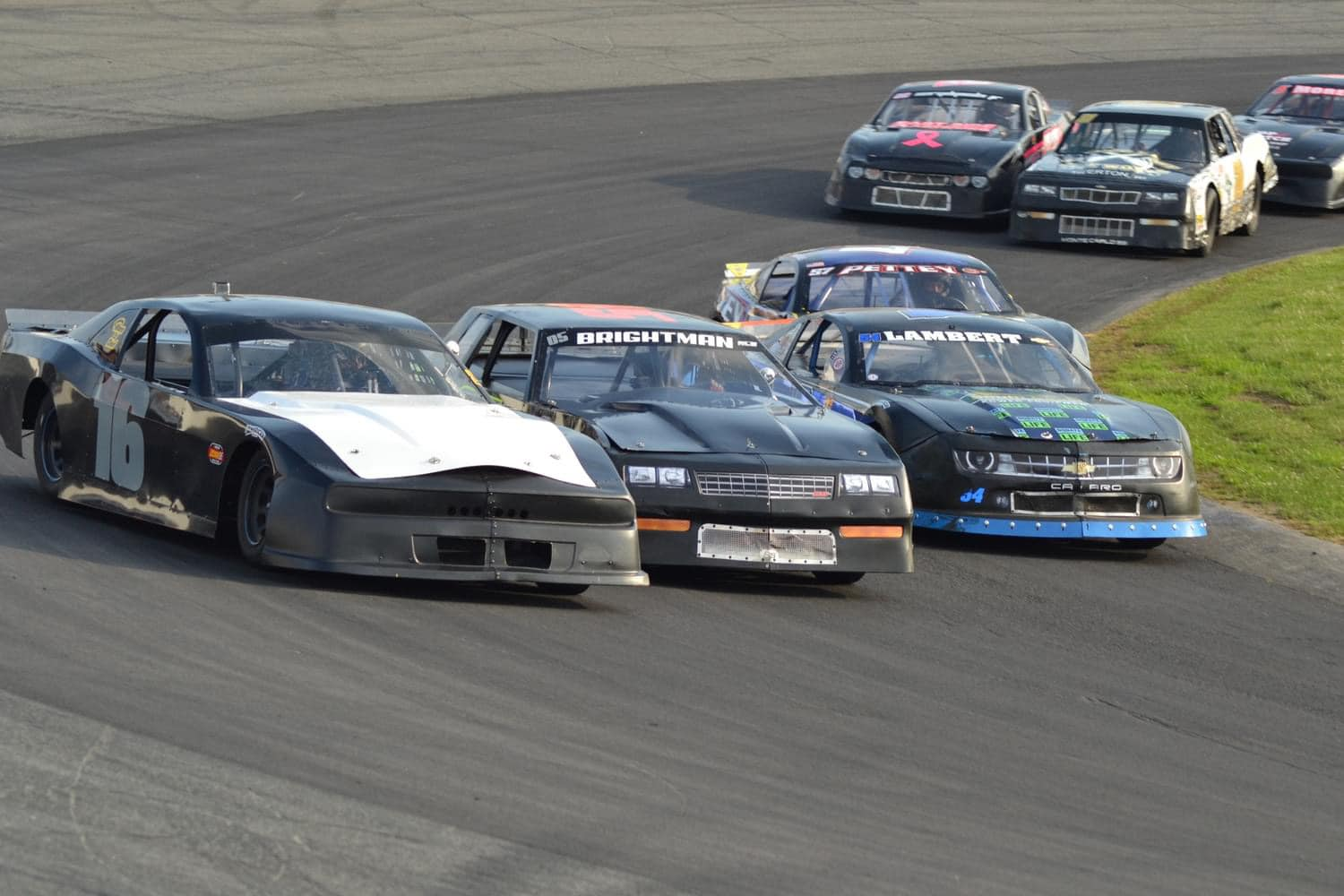
3 Wide action during Sportsman race

Every Friday during the racing season at Seekonk, the track opens its gates to lower budget racing aimed at kids and drivers who are looking to gain experience to move into the Saturday night action at the track. Phil's Propane also sponsors three races per year for each division in the Phil's Propane Triple Crown series. Both Seekonk Youth Racing Association races are 20 laps, sport 4 races are 25 laps, legend races are 25 laps, and pure stock races are 25 laps. The track's spectator drag series also visits during Fast Friday, but not weekly.

=== Fast Friday divisions ===
==== SYRA 600+750 ====
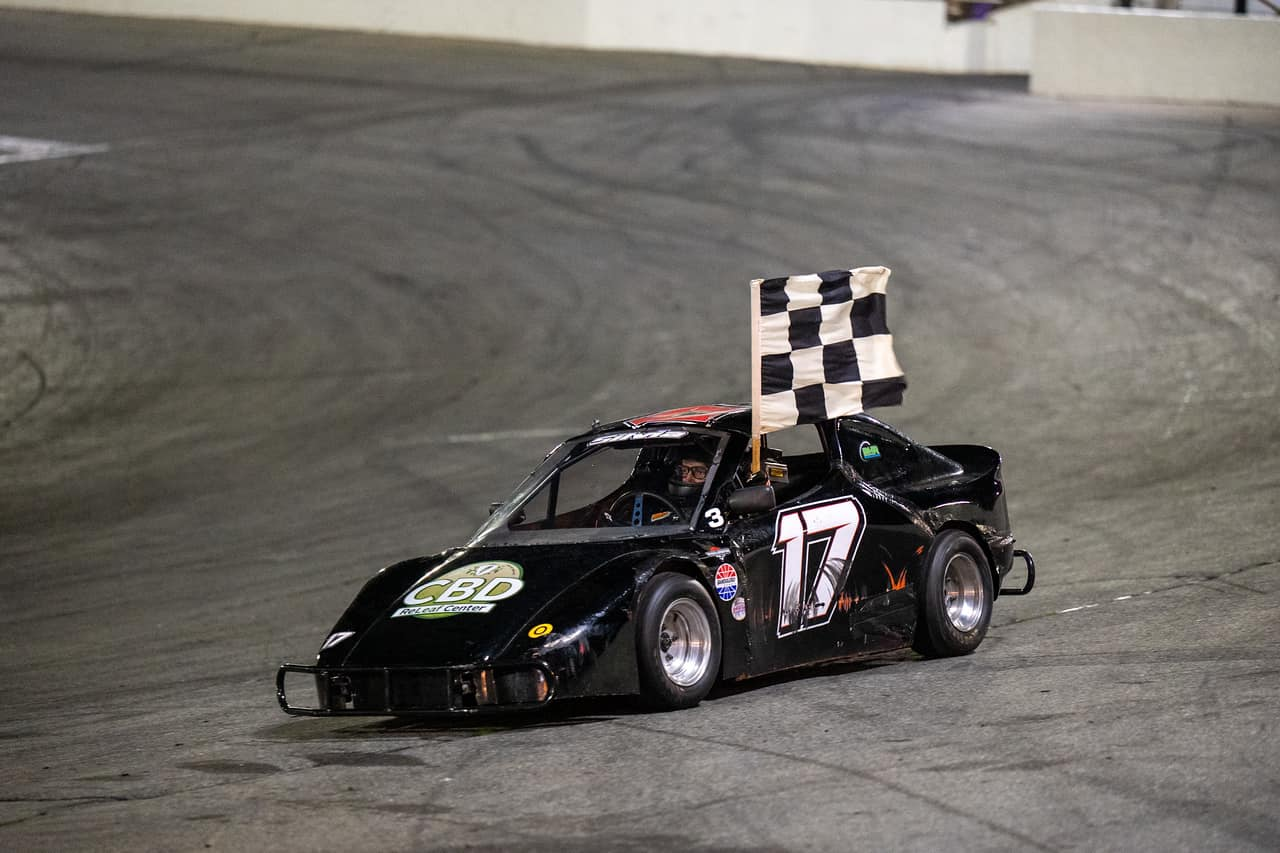
Chase Silvia's Bandolero

Featuring scaled-down NEXTEL cup bodies run by Honda engines, this is the absolute beginner class for kids aiming to race at Seekonk Speedway. The main difference between the 600 and 750 classes are the restrictor plates, with 750 allowing more power. The 600 class is mainly for kids aged 10–14, and the 750 class is mainly for kids aged 14–18, or younger kids who have more driving experience. Both series mandate a maximum of 55% left side weight, with the minimum weight including driver for the 600 class being 680 pounds and the 750 class being 700 pounds. The SYRA division is going to be phased out of Friday racing at Seekonk, being replaced entirely by bandoleros by 2018. For the 2017 racing season, the 750 division is being replaced by bandoleros.

==== Sport 4s ====
The Sport 4s at Seekonk Speedway are nearly stock front wheel drive cars with four cylinder engines, with all modifications only being for safety. This series is used as a place to learn racing mainly. Vehicles must remain stock in mechanical terms, allowing no competitor to give his or her car an advantage over the field. Any front wheel drive and four cylinder car made from 1980 to 2004 is eligible for competition in the sport fours, with some exceptions.

==== Legends ====
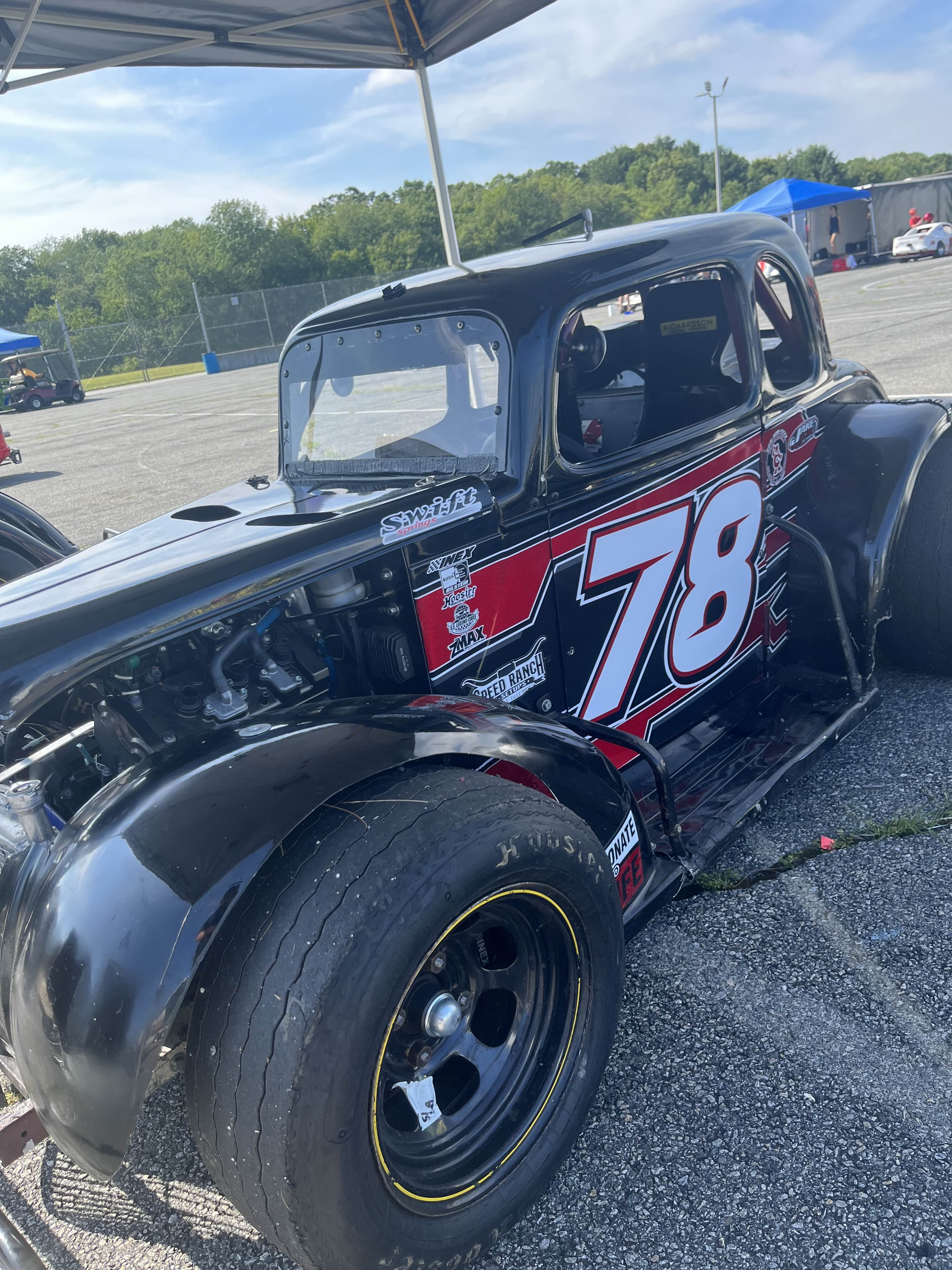
Jake Silvia's Legend Car

The Legends at Seekonk Speedway are run under INEX sanctioning, allowing Seekonk competitors to travel to any other INEX Legend race and compete, and allowing any other INEX Legend competitor to come to Seekonk and compete. In 2012, the Legends was added in the Fast Friday lineup. In 2013 Nicks Pit Stop jumped on board as the title sponsor for the legend cars. The Legends run sealed 1250cc Yamaha engines generating about 132 HP. The cars themselves weigh 1,300 pounds including driver and fluids, and run on specifically marked Federal Tires as mandated by INEX rules. The cars have a full tube frame with adjustable coil over springs.

==== Pure Stocks ====
Similar to the sport fours, the pure stocks are, as the name implies, pure stock cars. The pure stocks run stock V8 American rear wheel drive cars, with the only modifications allowed for safety. Allowed cars are American cars made from 1970 through 1992, hardtops only, and cars that have t-tops must be sealed off and braced. No weight is allowed to be added to any car, except for weight added for conversion to a race car through safety devices. Mustangs and two-seat cars are not allowed for competition. Stock transmissions only are allowed. The cars run on steel 7 inch wheels, and any street legal 65 series tires. All tires must be the same.

==== Crown Vic Cruisers ====
Crown Vic Cruisers are a debuting division on Fast Fridays after being on the thrill shows for the 2025 racing season. They are a grassroots racing division that the car can be raced at other tracks across New England.

== Thrill Shows ==
On select Saturdays throughout the year, Seekonk Speedway hosts thrill shows to celebrate holidays such as Memorial Day. These events generally include racing from the track's spectator drag series, featuring street-legal vehicles in one-lap drag races, enduro cars, enduro trucks, and occasionally monster trucks. In recent years, the track hosted semiannual demolition derbies, featuring some of the largest such events in the world, with up to 200 cars competing simultaneously on the track. Seekonk remains known for its unique setup for figure-8 racing, its 50-lap enduros with up to 100 cars, as well as occasional backwards races, trailer races, and enduro drags, among other thrill-show events that have regularly drawn crowds of 15,000 fans, particular on the 4th of July and Labor Day.

== Wall of Fame ==
Year	Inductee
2013	D. Anthony Venditti
2013	Irene Venditti
2013	Ron Bouchard
2013	Carl Berghman
2013	Norm Holden
2013	Len Ellis
2013	George Summers
2013	Johnny Verissimo
2014	Wayne Dion
2014	Ron Manfredo
2014	Don Dionne
2014	Billy Clarke
2015	Bobby Sprague
2015	Deke Astle
2016	Dave Humphrey
2016	Leo Cleary
2017	Nat Chiavettone
2017	Rollie Linblad
2017	Fred Astle Sr
2018	Ed St. Angelo
2018	Vinny Annarummo
2019	Jim Waterman
2019	Mickey Gill
2019	Manny Silvia
2021	Joe Rosenfield
2021	George Murray
2021	Wally Saleeba
2024	Rick Martin
2024	Kevin Boucher
2024	Gerald Sorterup
2024	Sources

== Notable races ==
Inaugural U.S. Pro Stock/Super Late Model Championship
Main article: U.S. Pro Stock/Super Late Model Championship
Position	Driver	Number
1	Tom Scully Jr.*	2
2	Derek Griffith	12D
3	Darrell Johnson Shaw	72
4	Derek Ramstrom	35
5	Dalton Sargeant	55
6	Dave Darling*	52
7	Jeremy Davis	09
8	Angelo Belsito*	8
9	Wyatt Alexander	96
10	Kenny Spencer III*	0
*Weekly Seekonk Speedway competitors

2016 Propane Plus ACT 150
Position	Driver	Number
1	Scott Payea	37VT
2	Dillon Moltz	5CT
3	Joey Polewarczyk Jr.	98NH
4	Wane Helliwell Jr.	27NH
5	Nicholas Johnson*	6MA
6	Raymond Parent	17RI
7	Ryan Vanasse*	11RI
8	Nick Sweet	40VT
9	Bobby Therrien	5VT
*Weekly Seekonk Speedway competitors

2016 DAV Pro Stock Open 150
Position	Driver	Number
1	Derek Griffith	12D
2	D. J. Shaw	60
3	Fred Astle*	30
4	Dave Darling*	52
5	Dave Farrington Jr.	7
6	Matt Swanson	49
7	Tom Scully Jr.*	2
8	Joey Doiron	73
9	Bobby Pelland III*	12
10	Dick Houlihan*	41
*Weekly Seekonk Speedway competitors

== Deaths ==
There have been three deaths at Seekonk Speedway, all taking place in 1947 in a span of three months. The track was closed for the remainder of the season following the death of Frank Facenda.

Name	Date	Age	Car	Description
Edward Casterline	June 7, 1947	32	Midget	Bay State Midget Racing Association, blew a tire and crashed through an infield fence. Died the next day in Truesdale Hospital in nearby Fall River, MA.
Frank Hanley	August 22, 1947	25?	Midget	Entering turn one Frank's engine let go, causing his car to spin. A fellow competitor hit Frank, sending him into a light pole. As Frank's car fell from the pole it rolled several more times, and was struck by two other drivers. He was later pronounced dead at Truesdale Hospital.
Fernando Facenda	September 12, 1947	25	Midget	Fernando's car overturned and spun into the wall at Seekonk Speedway. He was later pronounced dead in a Fall River hospital.

== Track Champions ==
Track champions at Seekonk Speedway, 1949–2019
Year	Mini modifieds	Mini stock	Modifieds	Legends	Formula 4	SYRA	Sport 4	Pure stock	Sport truck	Sportsman	Late model	Pro stock
1949			Hop Harrington									
1950			Mickey Gill									
1951			Dave Humphrey									
1952			Dave Humphrey									
1953			George Smaldone									
1954			George Smaldone									
1955			George Smaldone									
1956			Fred Luchesi									
1957			Hop Harrington									
1958			Hop Harrington									
1959			Dave Humphrey									
Year	Mini modifieds	Mini stock	Modifieds	Legends	Formula 4	SYRA	Sport 4	Pure stock	Sport truck	Sportsman	Late model	Pro stock
1960			Joe Rosenfield								Les Andrews	
1961		Reino Tulonen	Joe Rosenfield								Dick Machado	
1962		Gavin Couper	Joe Rosenfield								Wayne Silvia	
1963			Billy Clarke								Dick Machado	
1964			Joe Rosenfield								Wayne Silvia	
1965			Bugs Stevens								Ray Lackey	
1966			Deke Astle								Ed Flanagan	
1967			George Summers								Sonny Mello	
1968			Ron Bouchard								Bill Anderson	
1969			Ron Bouchard								George Ponte	
Year	Mini modifieds	Mini stock	Modifieds	Legends	Formula 4	SYRA	Sport 4	Pure stock	Sport truck	Sportsman	Late model	Pro stock
1970			Ron Bouchard								Don Dionne	
1971			Ron Bouchard								Norm Holden	
1972		Wayne Darling	Leo Cleary								Joe Oliver	
1973		Jerry Capozzoli	Red Barbeau								Vinnie Annarummo	
1974			George Summers							Wayne Dion	Russ Webber	
1975		Bill Tibbert, Jr.	George Murray							Frank Carpenter	Hank Goff	
1976			George Murray								Buddy Peckham	
1977			Bugs Stevens								Wayne Dion	
1978		Dan Meservey	Ron Bouchard							Ray Souliere		Charlie Perry
1979			Leo Cleary								Joe Cerullo	Don Dionne
Year	Mini modifieds	Mini stock	Modifieds	Legends	Formula 4	SYRA	Sport 4	Pure stock	Sport truck	Sportsman	Late model	Pro stock
1980										Ray Souliere	Ron Kingsborough	George Murray
1981			Bugs Stevens								Deke Astle Jr.	Don Dionne
1982	Bill Singerson		Gomer Taylor								Paul Round	Wayne Dion
1983	Marcel L'Etoile		Ed St. Angelo								Greg Warzycha	Norm Holden
1984	Bobby Fitzpatrick										Dave Sylvia	Norm Holden
1985	Dick Houlihan									Brian Thompson	Dennis Dupuis	Norm Holden
1986	Richie Murray									Rick Hanatow	Kevin Nabb	Leo Cleary
1987	Leo Cleary									Bill Willcox	Bob Stockel Jr.	Joey Cerullo
1988										Rick Hanatow	Ray Souliere	Johnny Tripp
1989										Roland Wheeler	Johnny Gomes	Bugs Stevens
Year	Mini modifieds	Mini stock	Modifieds	Legends	Formula 4	SYRA	Sport 4	Pure stock	Sport truck	Sportsman	Late model	Pro stock
1990										Jim Proulx	Rick Hanatow	Vinnie Annarummo
1991					Brian Thompson					Jim Proulx	Rick Hanatow	Rick Martin
1992					Doug Hanson					Scott Serydynski	Rick Hanatow	Vinnie Annarummo
1993					Kevin Casper					Mike Boehler	Mike Hassell	Vinnie Annarummo
1994										Matt Dewey	Bob Pelland Jr.	Fred Astle Jr.
1995					Dave Banville				Turk Gunbay	Matt Dewey	Bobby LeClerc	Bobby Tripp
1996					Ray Parent				Ray Souliere	Rusty Bryant	Scott Estrella	Rick Martin
1997					David Brightman				Ray Souliere	Rusty Bryant	Scott Estrella	Len Ellis Jr.
1998					Billy Prisco				Billy Flint	Bob Bettencourt Jr.	James Lawrence	Rick Martin
1999					Billy Prisco				Billy Flint	Bob Bettencourt Jr.	Bryan Souza	Rick Martin
Year	Mini modifieds	Mini stock	Modifieds	Legends	Formula 4	SYRA	Sport 4	Pure stock	Sport truck	Sportsman	Late model	Pro stock
2000					Mike Brodeur	Jason Heroux (Mini cup); B.J. Piekarski (Baby Grand)			Brian Clarke	Bobby Rose	James Lawrence	Fred Astle Jr.
2001					Lance Cambra	Steve Heroux			Brian Clarke	Dick Cavallaro	James Lawrence	Len Ellis Jr.
2002					Jason Arsenault	Brit Andersen			Kyle Casper	Sparky Arsenault	Kenny Spencer	Dick Houlihan
2003					Rob Murphy	Matthew Hudon (Journeyman); Nick Ribbe (Apprentice)			Kevin Casper	Dave Ratcliffe	Gerry DeGasparre Jr.	Dick Houlihan
2004						Nick Ribbe (Journeyman); Tom McVay (Apprentice)			Lee Hayes	Elmer Wing III	Glenn Lawton	Vinnie Annarummo
2005						Christopher Robinson (600); Zach Tucan (750)			Brian Clarke	Al Clements IV	Mike Brightman	Vinnie Annarummo
2006						Kyle Tringali (600); Zach Tucan (750)		Randy Arruda	Mike Cavallaro	Al Clements IV	Gerry DeGasparre Jr.	David Darling
2007						Tim Brown (600); Brian Mondeau (750)		Bill Chouinard	Mike Cavallaro	Sparky Arsenault	Gerry DeGasparre Jr.	David Darling
2008						Jake Spillers (600); Dylan Estrella (750)		Scott Cestodio	Mike Cavallaro	Sparky Arsenault	Gerry DeGasparre Jr	Fred Astle Jr
2009						Dave Hutchins Jr (600); Jake Spillers (750)		Scott Cestodio	Jody Tripp	Mike Mitchell	Ryan Vanasse	Fred Astle Jr
Year	Mini modifieds	Mini stock	Modifieds	Legends	Formula 4	SYRA	Sport 4	Pure stock	Sport truck	Sportsman	Late model	Pro stock
2010						Nick Lascoula (600); Dave Hutchins Jr. (750)	Ken Silvia	Nick Uhrig	Rick Martin	Steve Axon	Ryan Vanasse	Fred Astle Jr.
2011						Branden Dion (600); Curtis Rolando (750)	Kyle Pacheco	William Chouinard	Mike Cavallaro	Ryan Lineham	Gerry DeGasparre	Fred Astle Jr.
2012						Tyler Boudreau (600); Austin Blais (750)	Chuck McDonald	Jesse Melberg	Mike Cavallaro	Paul Lallier	Gerry Degasparre	David Darling
2013				Nick Lascuola		TJ Moreshead (600); Curtis Rolando (750)	Devin Miranda	John Robidoux	John Paiva	Scott Bruneau	Gerry Degasparre	Dave Darling
2014				Nick Lascuola		Dereck Debbis (600); Shelby Donovan (750)	Devin Miranda	Mark Murphy	Rob Murphy	Rey Lovelace	Bobby Pelland III	Kenny Spencer
2015				Jordan Lamothe		Karlin Levesque (600); Eric Lebrun (750)	David Westgate	Andrew Kun	Chase Belcher	Paul Lallier	Dylan Estrella	Angelo Belsito
2016				Jake Johnson		Evan Marchand (600); Luke Lebrun (750)	Mike Belanger	Andrew Kun	Mike Cavallaro	Scott Bruneau	Dylan Estrella	Tom Scully Jr (Track); Fred Astle Jr (NASCAR division 1)
2017				Joe Marfeo		Ava Chouinard (Mini cup); Devin Deshaies (Bandit); Mason Tessier (Outlaw)	David Westgate	Colby Lambert	Mike Duarte	Scott Bruneau	Ryan Lineham	Dave Darling (Track and NASCAR division 1)
2018				Jake Matheson		Devin Deshaies (Bandit); Evan Marchand (Outlaw)	AJ Manuel	Doug Benoit	Josh Hedges	Paul Lallier	Ryan Kuhn	Dave Darling (Track and NASCAR division 1)
2019				Peter Bennett		Reese Bogue (Bandit); Giovanni Ruggiero (Outlaw)	Mike Lefort	Greg Perry	Richie Murray	Corey Fanning	Tommy Adams	Dave Darling (Track and NASCAR division 1)
2020				Jake Johnson		Isaiah Newcomb (Outlaw) Ethan Dion (Bandit)	Mike Lefort	Doug Benoit				
2021				Luke LeBrun		Richie Helger Jr (Outlaw) Darren Krantz Jr (Bandit)	Mike Lefort	Greg Perry	Barry Shaw	Chad Baxter	Vinnie Arrenegado	Dave Darling
2022				Devin Deshaies		Bradley Strickland (Outlaw) Sam Macedo (Bandit)	Crystal Murray	Jeremy Lambert	Rick Martin	Craig Pianka	Mark Jenison	Mark Jenison
2023				Jacob Burns		Collin Vanasse (Outlaw) Parker Davis (Bandit)	Crystal Murray	Jared Corrderia	Rick Martin	Steve Axon	Vinnie Arrenegado	Mark Jenison
2024				Richie Helger Jr		Bryson Robidoux (Outlaw) David Bernier (Bandit)	Justin Leduc	Brent Robidoux	Rick Martin	Adam Pettey	Luke LeBrun	Dylan Estrella
Year	Mini modifieds	Mini stock	Modifieds	Legends	Formula 4	Bandolero	Sport 4	Pure stock	Sport truck	Sportsman	Late model	Pro stock

== Notable alumni ==
- Ron Bouchard (former competitor)
- Ken Bouchard (former competitor)
- Richie Evans (former competitor)
- Bugs Stevens (former competitor)
- Dale Shaw (former competitor)
- Reggie Ruggiero (former competitor)
- Allen Bestwick (former track announcer)
- Gio Ruggiero (former competitor)
- Tyler Tomassi (former competitor)
