= Northeastern Midget Association =

- Category: Auto racing
- Country: United States
- Region: Northeastern United States
- Inaugural season: 1953
- Classes: Midgets; Lights
- Current champions: John Zych Jr
- Drivers' champion: John Zych Jr
- Official website: nemaracing.com

The Northeastern Midget Association (NEMA) is a sanctioning body of short track auto racing in the United States and is the oldest sanctioning body of midget car type open wheel racing in North America.

== History ==
On March 8, 1953, a meeting was held at the Thompson Speedway Clubhouse for the purpose of forming a new midget racing organization. The founders were dedicated racing men determined to salvage the remains of what had been the most successful spectator sport in the United States. The first officially sanctioned NEMA race took place at the famed Seekonk Speedway May 30, 1953. It was a two billed show in conjunction with the American Racing Drivers Club (ARDC) of New York, with each organization running its own program. The cars and drivers came from the ranks of several other racing organizations which had fallen on hard times and the pits of the infant organization were filled to capacity with no less than forty six cars signed-in. Fred Meeker captured the first NEMA victory driving the Kerhan #17 V-8. The years of 1953 and 1954 saw the fortunes of midget racing at their lowest ebb. Total purses of less than what is paid to the winner of a race feature today were common place. The group credited with keeping NEMA afloat during this timewere; Milt Dentch, the first club president, car owners Ray and Wen Kelley, and John McCarthy; drivers Al Pillion and Ray Roberts; racing officials Lenny Poe and many others. NEMA gradually outgrew its humble beginnings and emerged as a solid professional division. The early rules of NEMA restricted the use of costly specialized racing engines, specifically the twin overhead camshaft Offenhauser. These engines were so powerful and expensive that owners with modified stock engines had little chance at the top prize money. By 1957 the stock block powered machines had developed to such an extent that this restriction was removed and from this time until 1968, NEMA crowned an Offy non-Offy champion, with one being the overall champion. Along with this improved competition with this rule change came a renewal of interest in midget racing among competitors as well as the fans, who came out in large numbers to see the Ford Falcon and Chevy II engines take their share of wins over the mighty “Offy”.

== Current ==
NEMA remains one of the main short track sanctioning bodies in the country and one of the largest in the northeastern US. With 10-15 races a year, the series runs at some of the most historic tracks in America, and when top the feature event, NEMA midgets support some of the top series such as; ISMA and the NASCAR Whelen Modified Tour. NEMA also sanction its own junior support series, NEMA Lites. The Lites are similar in appearance to the traditional midgets, but have less power, some running the USAC Ford Focus Midget engine, and are limited in components they are able to use; all to control cost.

== Champions ==
Season	Driver
1953	Bill Eldridge
1954	Bill Eldridge
1955	Ray Burke
1956	Al Pillion
1957	Bill Eldridge
1958	Bill Eldridge
1959	Al Pillion
1960	Dick Brown
1961	Dick Brown
1962	Joe Csiki
1963	Joe Csiki
1964	Walt Gale
1965	Joe Csiki
1966	Ray Roberts
1967	Dave Humphrey
1968	Dave Humphrey
1969	Dave Humphey
1970	Dave Humphrey/ Lou Fray
1971	Dave Humphrey
1972	Johnny Mann
1973	Butch Walsh
1974	Johnny Mann
1975	Bobby White
1976	Armond Holley
1977	Lee Smith
1978	Dave Humphrey
1979	Bobby White
1980	Lee Smith
1981	Nokie Fornoro
1982	Lee Smith
1983	Drew Fornoro
1984	Billy Mann
1985	Drew Fornoro
1986	Drew Fronoro
1987	Bobby Seymour
1988	Drew Fronoro
1989	Joey Coy
1990	Russ Stoehr
1991	Joey Coy
1992	Drew Fornoro
1993	Joey Coy
1994	Mike Seymour
1995	Drew Fornoro
1996	Russ Stoehr
1998	Drew Fronoro
1999	Drew Fronoro
2000	Russ Stoehr
2001	Russ Stoehr
2002	Russ Stoehr
2003	Joey Payne Jr.
2004	Ben Seitz
2005	Ben Seitz
2006	Ben Seitz
2007	Ben Seitz
2008	Randy Cabral
2009	Randy Cabral
2010	Russ Stoehr
2011	Randy Cabral
2012	Randy Cabral
2013	John Zych Jr.
2014	Randy Cabral
2015	John Zych Jr.
2016	John Zych Jr.
2017	Season Starts 5/7/17
