= 2006 NASCAR Whelen Southern Modified Tour =

The 2006 NASCAR Whelen Southern Modified Tour was the second season of the NASCAR Whelen Southern Modified Tour (WSMT). It began with the NASCAR Whelen Southern Modified Tour 150 at Caraway Speedway on March 25. It ended with the Night of the Modifieds 100 at Southern National Motorsports Park on October 21. Junior Miller, who entered the season as the defending championship, would win his second and last championship in the series, six points ahead of series runner up Tim Brown.

== Schedule ==
No.	Race title	Track	Date
1	NASCAR Whelen Southern Modified Tour 150	Caraway Speedway, Asheboro, North Carolina	March 25
2	Kevin Whitaker Chevrolet 150	Greenville-Pickens Speedway, Greenville, South Carolina	April 8
3	NASCAR Whelen Southern Modified Tour 150	Caraway Speedway, Asheboro, North Carolina	April 15
4	94.9 Star Country 200	Motor Mile Speedway, Radford, Virginia	April 23
5	NASCAR Whelen Southern Modified Tour 150	Caraway Speedway, Asheboro, North Carolina	June 30
6	Advance Auto Parts 199	Bowman Gray Stadium, Winston-Salem, North Carolina	August 5
7	Made In America Whelen 300 (Note: The Made In America Whelen 300 was held as a combined event, with competitors from the Whelen Modified Tour competing along with competitors for the Whelen Modified Tour. The race was run with a series-based point distribution, where drivers received points and statistical credit for their finish relative to other drivers in their series, not to the whole field in general.)	Martinsville Speedway, Martinsville, Virginia	September 2
8	NASCAR Whelen Southern Modified Tour 150	Caraway Speedway, Asheboro, North Carolina	September 9
9	NASCAR Whelen Southern Modified Tour 150	Ace Speedway, Altamahaw, North Carolina	September 15
10	NASCAR Whelen Southern Modified Tour 150	Caraway Speedway, Asheboro, North Carolina	September 23
11	Hickory 150	Hickory Motor Speedway, Hickory, North Carolina	September 22
12	Star Country 94.9 / Adams Construction 150	Motor Mile Speedway, Radford, Virginia	October 14
13	Night of the Modifieds 100	Southern National Motorsports Park, Kenly, North Carolina	October 21

== Results and standings ==
=== Races ===
No.	Race	Pole position	Most laps led	Winning driver	Manufacturer
1	NASCAR Whelen Southern Modified Tour 150	Burt Myers	Ted Christopher	Ted Christopher	Chevrolet
2	Kevin Whitaker Chevrolet 150	Junior Miller	Junior Miller	Junior Miller	Dodge
3	NASCAR Whelen Southern Modified Tour 150	Brian Loftin	Ted Christopher	Junior Miller	Dodge
4	94.9 Star Country 200	Brian Loftin	L. W. Miller; Jay Foley (Note: Miller and Foley both led 100 laps.)	L. W. Miller	Chevrolet
5	NASCAR Whelen Southern Modified Tour 150	Brian Loftin	Junior Miller	Junior Miller	Chevrolet
6	Advance Auto Parts 199	Burt Myers	Lee Jeffreys	Jason Myers	Chevrolet
7	Made In America Whelen 300	Mike Stefanik	Mike Stefanik	Jimmy Blewett	Chevrolet
8	NASCAR Whelen Southern Modified Tour 150	Tim Brown	Tim Brown	Junior Miller	Chevrolet
9	NASCAR Whelen Southern Modified Tour 150	Tim Brown	Junior Miller	Brian King	Pontiac
10	NASCAR Whelen Southern Modified Tour 150	Tim Brown	Frank Fleming	L. W. Miller	Pontiac
11	Hickory 150	Burt Myers	Josh Nichols	Junior Miller	Dodge
12	Star Country 94.9 / Adams Construction 150	Burt Myers	L. W. Miller	L. W. Miller	Pontiac
13	Night of the Modifieds 100	L. W. Miller	Tim Brown	Junior Miller	Dodge

=== Drivers' championship ===
(key) Bold - Pole position awarded by time. Italics - Pole position set by final practice results or rainout. * – Most laps led.

Pos	Driver	CRW	GRE	CRW	DUB	CRW	BGS	MAR	CRW	ACE	CRW	HCY	DUB	SNM	Points
1	Junior Miller	4	1**	1	5	1**	4	39	1	6*	11	1	8	1	2098
2	Tim Brown	8	2	3	9	8	5	9	**2***	**2**	**3**	2	5	2*	2092
3	L. W. Miller	19	3	2	1*		2	25	3	8	1	4	1*	**4**	1924
4	Burt Myers	**3**	4	23	7	5	**17**	13	7	3	10	**3**	**7**	3	1913
5	Brian King	15	14	10	24	2	8	35	5	1	4	8	10	6	1824
6	Jason Myers	18	6	24	3	10	1	28	14	7	7	13	9	7	1788
7	Brian Pack	6	7	20	4	17	21	DNQ	6	5	8	11	2	8	1778
8	Bobby Hutchens	10	5	14	20	6	3	30	11	9	12	5	14	12	1760
9	Gene Pack	21	11	6	10	9	11	10	12	12	6	24	13	10	1705
10	Frank Fleming	20	10	22	22	4	10	26	16	13	2*	7	17		1534
11	Jay Foley			12	2*	11	20	18	10	4	14	15	6	13	1492
12	Michael Clifton	7	21	13	12	21	6	11	8	10		23	21		1382
13	Brian Loftin	13	12	**15**	**23**	**7**		32	4		5	9	18		1301
14	Jay Mize	23	17		18	19	25		13	11	18	12	16	14	1235
15	Johnny Sutton	25	13	16	17	16	23		17		16	16			990
16	Kevin Powell	DNQ	16	21	13		7	36				19	12		870
17	Josh Nichols	12	15	9	19	14					13	10*			868
18	Joe Lucas	DNQ	19	17	16	13					17	25	15		806
19	Lee Jeffreys	27	20	26	15	15	19*					17			724
20	Jay Hedgecock	9	9	11	21	18	22								712
21	Chuck Hossfeld	2		25	11	3		31^{1}						5	708
22	Earl Baker	14	18	18		12						20		9	707
23	Wesley Swartout						16		15		9	21	11		601
24	John Smith	16		7	8		14								524
25	Ted Christopher	1*		4*	6			2^{1}							490
26	Andy Seuss	22			14						19		4		484
27	Brandon Hire					20	12	DNQ				18			451
28	Jamie Tomaino	5		8				34^{1}							447
29	Brian Cranmer	24		5			9								384
30	Jonathan Brown	17					13					14			357
31	Kevin Eckerich	26							9		20				326
32	Brandon Ward											6	3		315
33	George Brunnhoelzl III												20	11	233
34	Jay Charles												19	15	224
35	Randy Butner						18	DNQ^{2}							224
36	Alex Hoag		8												142
37	Bradley Robbins	11													130
38	Mike Herman Jr.						15								118
39	Jeremy Stoltz										15				118
40	Steve Whitt			19				40^{1}							106
41	Bo Bo Brown											22			97
42	Al Hill						24								91
43	Tam Topham				25										88
44	Tyler Haydt											26			85
	Jamie Tomaino Jr.							22							
Drivers ineligible for NWSMT points, because at the combined event at Martinsville they chose to drive for NWMT points
	Jimmy Blewett							1							
	James Civali							3							
	Todd Szegedy							4							
	Doug Coby							5							
	Ron Yuhas Jr.							6							
	Matt Hirschman							7							
	Kevin Goodale							8							
	Ed Flemke Jr.							12							
	Mike Stefanik							**14***							
	Zach Sylvester							15							
	Jerry Marquis							16							
	Donny Lia							17							
	Anthony Sesely							19							
	Jimmy Storace							20							
	Wade Cole							21							
	Richard Houlihan							23							
	Danny Sammons							24							
	Tony Hirschman Jr.							27							
	Ron Silk							29							
	Ken Barry							33							
	Mike Andrews							37							
	Reggie Ruggiero							38							
	Eric Beers							41							
	Rob Summers							42							
	Richard Savary							43							
	Jake Marosz							DNQ							
	Ken Heagy							DNQ							
	Jon McKennedy							DNQ							
Pos	Driver	CRW	GRE	CRW	DUB	CRW	BGS	MAR	CRW	ACE	CRW	HCY	DUB	SNM	Points

- ^{1} – Scored points towards the Whelen Modified Tour.
- ^{2} – Randy Butner received championship points, despite the fact that the driver did not qualify for the race.

== See also ==
- 2006 NASCAR Nextel Cup Series
- 2006 NASCAR Busch Series
- 2006 NASCAR Craftsman Truck Series
- 2006 ARCA Re/Max Series
- 2006 NASCAR Whelen Modified Tour
