= 2011 NASCAR Whelen Southern Modified Tour =

The 2011 NASCAR Whelen Southern Modified Tour was the seventh season of the NASCAR Whelen Southern Modified Tour (WSMT). It began with the Spring Classic 150 at Caraway Speedway on March 13. It ended with the Caraway 150 at the same track on October 22. Burt Myers entered the season as the defending championship. George Brunnhoelzl III would win his second championship in the series, 181 points ahead of series runner up Andy Seuss.

== Schedule ==
No.	Race title	Track	Date
1	Spring Classic 150	Caraway Speedway, Asheboro, North Carolina	March 13
2	Hickory 150	Hickory Motor Speedway, Hickory, North Carolina	April 2
3	South Boston 150	South Boston Speedway, South Boston, Virginia	April 17
4	Caraway 150	Caraway Speedway, Asheboro, North Carolina	April 23
5	Firecracker 150	Caraway Speedway, Asheboro, North Carolina	July 1
6	Strutmasters.com 199	Bowman Gray Stadium, Winston-Salem, North Carolina	August 6
7	UNOH Perfect Storm 150 (Note: The UNOH Perfect Storm 150 was held as a combined event, with competitors from the Whelen Southern Modified Tour competing along with competitors for the Whelen Modified Tour. The race was run with a series-based point distribution, where drivers received points and statistical credit for their finish relative to other drivers in their series, not to the whole field in general.)	Bristol Motor Speedway, Bristol, Tennessee	August 24
8	Caraway 150	Caraway Speedway, Asheboro, North Carolina	August 26
9	Newport News Shipbuilding 150	Langley Speedway, Hampton, Virginia	September 3
10	Southern Thompson 75	Thompson Speedway Motorsports Park, Thompson, Connecticut	September 11
11	Tri-County 150	Tri-County Motor Speedway, Hudson, North Carolina	September 24
12	Caraway 150	Caraway Speedway, Asheboro, North Carolina	October 1
13	UNOH Southern Slam 150	Charlotte Motor Speedway, Concord, North Carolina	October 13
14	Caraway 150	Caraway Speedway, Asheboro, North Carolina	October 22

== Results and standings ==
=== Races ===
No.	Race	Pole position	Most laps led	Winning driver	Manufacturer
1	Spring Classic 150	Brian Loftin	Burt Myers	George Brunnhoelzl III	Chevrolet
2	Hickory 150	Patrick Emerling	Patrick Emerling	George Brunnhoelzl III	Chevrolet
3	South Boston 150	Lee Jeffreys	Zach Brewer	Ted Christopher	Chevrolet
4	Caraway 150	George Brunnhoelzl III	Ted Christopher	Ted Christopher	Chevrolet
5	Firecracker 150	Brian Loftin	L. W. Miller	L. W. Miller	Chevrolet
6	Strutmasters.com 199	George Brunnhoelzl III	L. W. Miller	L. W. Miller	Chevrolet
7	UNOH Perfect Storm 150	Bobby Santos III	Ryan Newman	Ryan Newman	Chevrolet
8	Caraway 150	Andy Seuss	Andy Seuss	Andy Seuss	Chevrolet
9	Newport News Shipbuilding 150	Burt Myers	Thomas Stinson	Andy Seuss	Chevrolet
10	Southern Thompson 75	Andy Seuss	Steve Masse	George Brunnhoelzl III	Chevrolet
11	Tri-County 150	George Brunnhoelzl III	George Brunnhoelzl III	George Brunnhoelzl III	Chevrolet
12	Caraway 150	George Brunnhoelzl III	Andy Seuss	Andy Seuss	Chevrolet
13	UNOH Southern Slam 150	George Brunnhoelzl III	George Brunnhoelzl III	Tim Brown	Chevrolet
14	Caraway 150	Andy Seuss	George Brunnhoelzl III	George Brunnhoelzl III	Chevrolet

=== Drivers' championship ===
(key) Bold - Pole position awarded by time. Italics - Pole position set by final practice results or rainout. * – Most laps led.

Pos	Driver	CRW	HCY	SBO	CRW	CRW	BGS	BRI	CRW	LGY	TMP	TRI	CRW	CLT	CRW	Points
1	George Brunnhoelzl III	1	1	2	**4**	2	**3**	29	2	7	1	**1***	**2**	**2***	1**	2415
2	Andy Seuss	8	6	15	13	3	8	9	**1***	1	**4**	2	1**	4	**4**	2231
3	Jason Myers	7	7	7	6	12	4	14	3	5	12	5	7	5	6	2103
4	Tim Brown	2	16	4	8	DNQ	9	23	12	6	3	6	3	1	7	2067
5	John Smith	6	4	5	3	4	13	16	5	2	13	12	11	8	14	2043
6	Frank Fleming	12	14	6	5	9	12	8	4	8	6	10	12	6	12	1988
7	L. W. Miller	4	12	13	18	1*	1*	19	6	9	19	7	10	16	10	1984
8	Austin Pack	10	Wth	12	7	8	15	15	9	12	10	8	9	14	8	1875
9	Burt Myers	14*	8			5	2	17	10	**4**	2	3	8	3	2	1854
10	Thomas Stinson	3	5	19	2	7				3*	9	18	6	9	15	1570
11	Mike Norman	20	11	17	20	11	6			11		16	DNQ	17	11	1336
12	Josh Nichols	21	10	16	12	16	11					11	13	10	13	1233
13	Jonathan Kievman	15	17		17	10	14			10		14		18		966
14	Renee Dupuis		9						8	13	11	9				672
15	Mike Speeney	16	13	18	16	14										584
16	Zach Brewer	17	2	3*	15											580
17	James Civali	5	3	14	10			4^{1}								580
18	Brandon Ward								13			4	5		9	577
19	Daniel Hemric							32	7					11	3	571
20	Brian Loftin	**18**				**13**							4		5	558
21	Gary Putnam	11			11						16			13		499
22	Patrick Emerling	13	**15***	9	19			5^{1}								496
23	Donnie Lacks			11		15			11			17				490
24	Ted Christopher	19		1	1*											481
25	Greg Butcher		18				7				17					367
26	Corey LaJoie					6		28								288
27	Lee Jeffreys			8	9											285
28	Steve Park										5			12		282
29	Dean Ward						16					15				233
30	Randy Butner						5									155
31	Donny Lia										8					147
32	Timmy Solomito										7					146
33	Johnny Sutton													7		146
34	Todd Szegedy	9						3^{1}								138
35	Daryl Lacks			10												134
36	Derrick Hill						10									134
37	Steve Masse										14*					131
38	Terry Gaither											13				124
39	Gary Fountain Sr.	22			14											121
40	Jeff Malave										15					118
41	Bryan Dauzat													15		118
42	Rob Fuller										18					109
43	Rick Gentes										20					103
44	Richard Savary										21					100
45	Jeff Fuller										22					97
	Keith Rocco										23					
Drivers ineligible for NWSMT points, because at the combined event at Bristol they chose to drive for NWMT points
	Ryan Newman							1*								
	Justin Bonsignore							2								
	Eric Beers							6								
	Ron Silk							7								
	Eric Goodale							10								
	Eric Berndt							11								
	Woody Pitkat							12								
	Matt Hirschman							13								
	Ed Flemke Jr.							18								
	Jamie Tomaino							20								
	Rowan Pennink							21								
	Wade Cole							22								
	Mike Stefanik							24								
	Doug Coby							25								
	Bobby Santos III							**26**								
	Gary McDonald							27								
	Bryon Chew							30								
	Erick Rudolph							31								
	Andy Petree							33								
	Ron Yuhas Jr.							34								
Pos	Driver	CRW	HCY	SBO	CRW	CRW	BGS	BRI	CRW	LGY	TMP	TRI	CRW	CLT	CRW	Points

- ^{1} – Scored points towards the Whelen Modified Tour.

== See also ==
- 2011 NASCAR Sprint Cup Series
- 2011 NASCAR Nationwide Series
- 2011 NASCAR Camping World Truck Series
- 2011 ARCA Racing Series
- 2011 NASCAR Whelen Modified Tour
- 2011 NASCAR Canadian Tire Series
- 2011 NASCAR Stock V6 Series
- 2011 NASCAR Corona Series
