= Corey LaJoie =

American racing driver (born 1991)

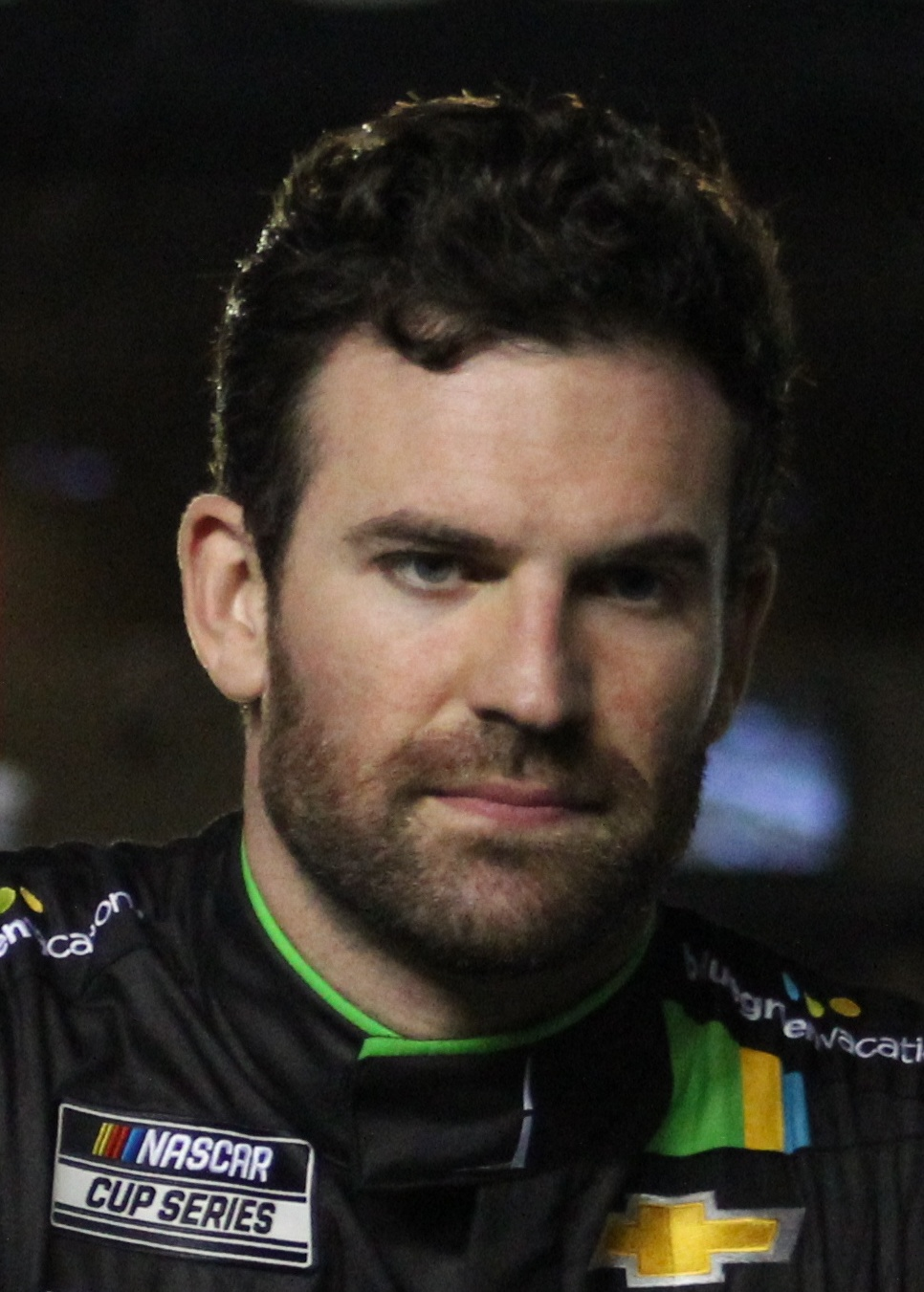
- LaJoie at Daytona International Speedway in 2024
- Born: Corey Daniel LaJoie; September 25, 1991 (age 35); Charlotte, North Carolina, U.S.
- Height: 6 ft 1 in (1.85 m)
- Weight: 180 lb (82 kg)
- Achievements: 2010 Atlanta 150 Winner; 2022 Virginia is for Racing Lovers 200 Winner

NASCAR Cup Series career
- 276 races run over 10 years
- 2026 position: 56th
- Best finish: 25th (2023)
- First race: 2014 Sylvania 300 (New Hampshire)
- Last race: 2025 Quaker State 400 (Atlanta)
Wins	Top tens	Poles
0	11	0

NASCAR O'Reilly Auto Parts Series career
- 22 races run over 4 years
- 2017 position: 58th
- Best finish: 31st (2016)
- First race: 2013 Ford EcoBoost 300 (Homestead)
- Last race: 2017 Ford EcoBoost 300 (Homestead)
Wins	Top tens	Poles
0	2	0

NASCAR FedEx Freight Truck Series career
- 37 races run over 5 years
- 2026 position: 21st
- Best finish: 21st (2026)
- First race: 2014 UNOH 225 (Kentucky)
- Last race: 2026 Craftsman 200 (Homestead)
Wins	Top tens	Poles
0	12	0

ARCA Menards Series career
- 7 races run over 3 years
- Best finish: 22nd (2013)
- First race: 2012 ARCA Re/Max American 200 (Rockingham)
- Last race: 2023 General Tire 100 at The Glen (Watkins Glen)
- First win: 2013 Ansell ActivArmr 150 (Chicagoland)
- Last win: 2013 ZLOOP 150 (Kentucky)
Wins	Top tens	Poles
3	4	1

ARCA Menards Series East career
- 37 races run over 7 years
- Best finish: 2nd (2012)
- First race: 2009 Pepsi Full Fender Frenzy 100 (Thompson)
- Last race: 2016 United Site Services 70 (New Hampshire)
- First win: 2012 NASCAR Hall of Fame 150 (Bowman Gray)
- Last win: 2016 United Site Services 70 (New Hampshire)
Wins	Top tens	Poles
6	22	1
- Statistics up to date as of November 8, 2026.

Corey Daniel LaJoie (born September 25, 1991), nicknamed SuperShoe, is an American professional stock car racing driver, crew chief, analyst for NASCAR on Prime Video, podcaster, and businessman. He last competed part-time in the NASCAR Cup Series, driving the No. 99 Ford Mustang Dark Horse for RFK Racing and full-time in the NASCAR Craftsman Truck Series, driving the No. 10 Ram 1500 for Kaulig Racing. LaJoie is the son of two-time Busch Series champion Randy LaJoie. He was formerly a development driver for Richard Petty Motorsports and JGL Racing.

== Racing career ==
=== Early career ===
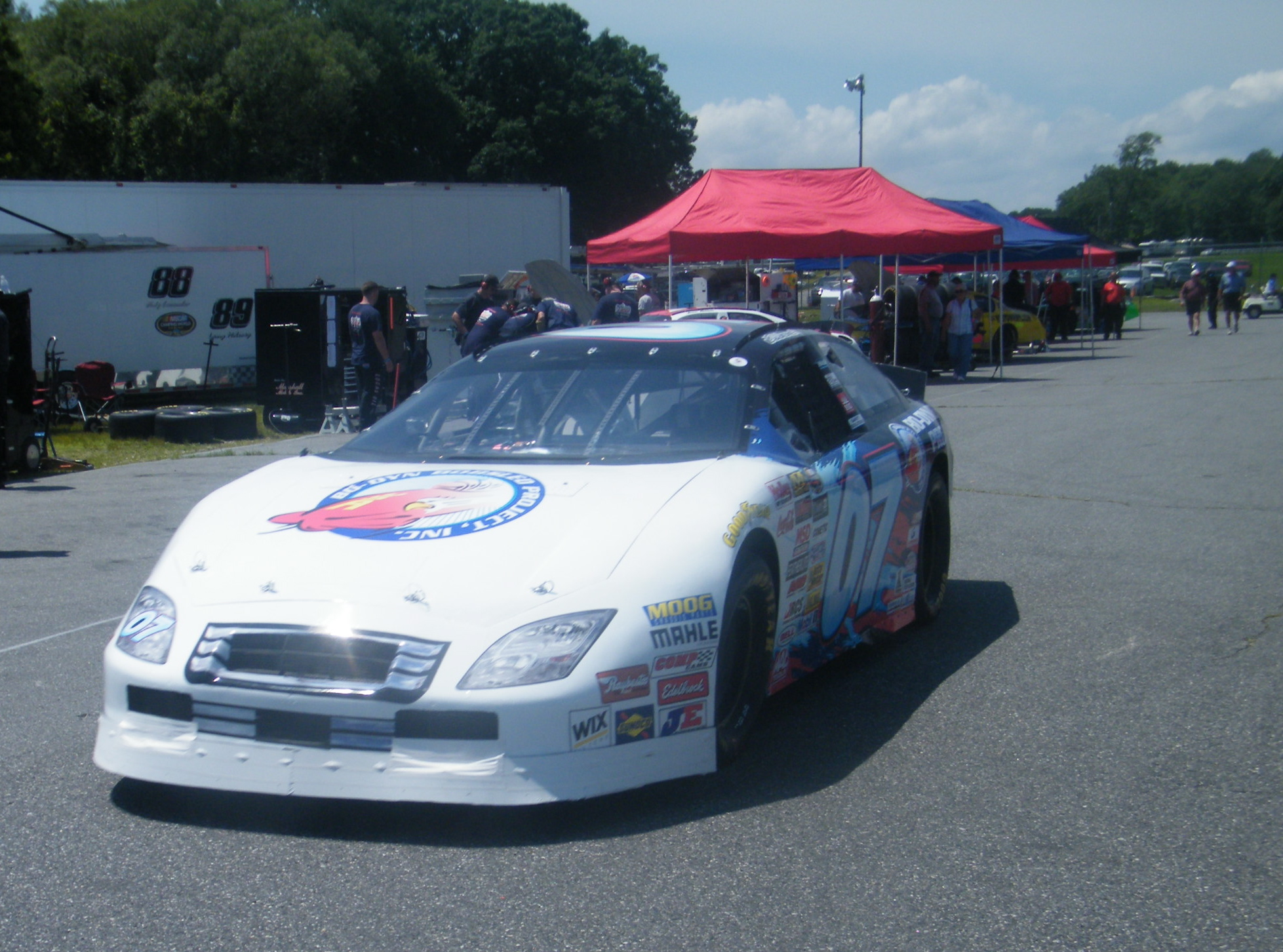
LaJoie's No. 07 NASCAR Camping World East Series car at Thompson Speedway Motorsports Park in 2009

LaJoie started his racing career in 1996, competing in kart racing events, winning 19 times on both dirt and asphalt tracks. He moved in 2003 to the INEX Bandolero series, scoring twelve wins and winning the series' Summer Shootout Championship. LaJoie began racing Legends cars in 2005, and in 2006 moved to the Aaron's Pro Challenge Series, where he won 10 of 12 races that year. Between 2007 and 2009, LaJoie competed in the UARA-Stars Late Model Touring Series, scoring one win and ten top-ten finishes in seventeen starts in the series.

=== Camping World East Series and ARCA Series ===
==== 2009 ====
In 2009, LaJoie made his debut in the NASCAR Camping World East Series at Thompson Speedway

==== 2012–2013 ====
LaJoie remained in the series through the 2012 season, scoring his first win in the series in June 2012 at Bowman Gray Stadium; He scored four additional wins over the course of the season, finishing the year second in points. In addition, LaJoie ran a limited schedule in the ARCA Racing Series in the second half of 2013, winning his first start of the year, and second career start, at Chicagoland Speedway in July, and then in his next race at Pocono Raceway in August.

=== NASCAR ===
==== 2013: Nationwide Series debut ====
LaJoie, who had been named to the 2012 NASCAR Next class of up-and-coming drivers, entered the 2013 season with only a limited schedule planned, including selected NASCAR Nationwide Series races for Tommy Baldwin Racing, however in June it was announced that he had signed with Richard Petty Motorsports as a development driver, with plans to run in the Nationwide Series later that year.

In November 2013, LaJoie made his NASCAR Nationwide Series debut at Homestead-Miami Speedway, driving the No. 9 Ford for Richard Petty Motorsports. He was involved in an accident during the race and finished 34th.

==== 2014: Cup series debut ====
In June 2014, LaJoie joined Biagi-DenBeste Racing to drive five races, starting at Kentucky. LaJoie struggled in these races, crashing in three of them. In September 2014, LaJoie made his Sprint Cup Series debut in the Sylvania 300 at Loudon, racing for Randy Humphrey Racing.

==== 2016: Return to NASCAR ====
LaJoie returned to NASCAR in 2016 after leaving in 2014, driving the No. 24 Toyota Camry for JGL Racing in the Xfinity Series at Atlanta Motor Speedway.

==== 2017: BK Racing ====
In 2017, LaJoie returned to the Cup Series and signed with BK Racing, driving the No. 83 Camry part-time. Trying to make the 2017 Daytona 500 as an Open team (without a charter, thus no starting spot guaranteed) with BK Racing, LaJoie was turning his first laps at Daytona International Speedway during the Can-Am Duels due to practice being rained out. Trailing Reed Sorenson, the only other Open driver, with under fifteen laps to go, LaJoie spun out Sorenson in the tri-oval, ensuring himself a spot in the 500 and making Paul Menard start at the back of the field as Menard was also involved in the crash and had to start in a backup car. After the race, LaJoie said that "I do feel bad" and that "if that was my mom, I'd probably spin her out to make the Daytona 500 too." Sorenson was incensed after the incident, calling the crash "moronic" and "pretty crappy" while saying that LaJoie could have hurt somebody with reckless driving.

==== 2018: TriStar Motorsports ====
In 2018, LaJoie moved from BK Racing to TriStar Motorsports for a part-time schedule, splitting the No. 72 with Cole Whitt. LaJoie entered the 2018 season with high hopes in the Daytona 500, and qualified 32nd for the 500, but unfortunately blew an engine on lap nine. He made his second start for the team at ISM Raceway in March, once again blowing an engine early in the race. In the Coca-Cola 600, LaJoie went as high as eighth but finished 26th. At year’s end, TriStar shut down, throwing LaJoie out of his part-time ride.

==== 2019–2020: Go Fas Racing ====
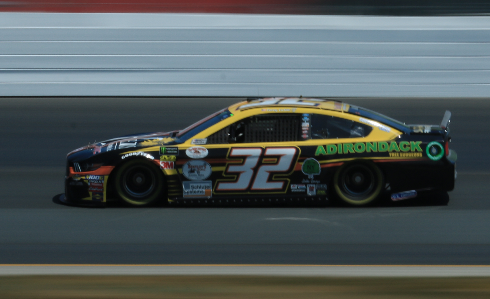
LaJoie practicing at New Hampshire Motor Speedway in 2019

LaJoie joined Go Fas Racing's No. 32 Ford in 2019. For the 2019 Daytona 500, Go Fas Racing made headlines by placing a picture of LaJoie's face on the No. 32 car as part of Old Spice's sponsorship. LaJoie finished 18th after blowing a right-front tire just 20 laps into the race. He scored two top tens during the year with a sixth at Daytona's Coke Zero Sugar 400 and seventh at Talladega's 1000Bulbs.com 500.

He returned to the No. 32 for 2020 on a one-year contract extension. In the Daytona 500, LaJoie impacted an airborne Ryan Newman coming to the finish, denting LaJoie's windshield and knocking the wind out of him; LaJoie, who finished eighth, was ultimately uninjured while Newman was briefly hospitalized. On August 21, LaJoie announced that he will part ways with Go Fas Racing at the end of the 2020 season.

==== 2021–2024: Spire Motorsports ====
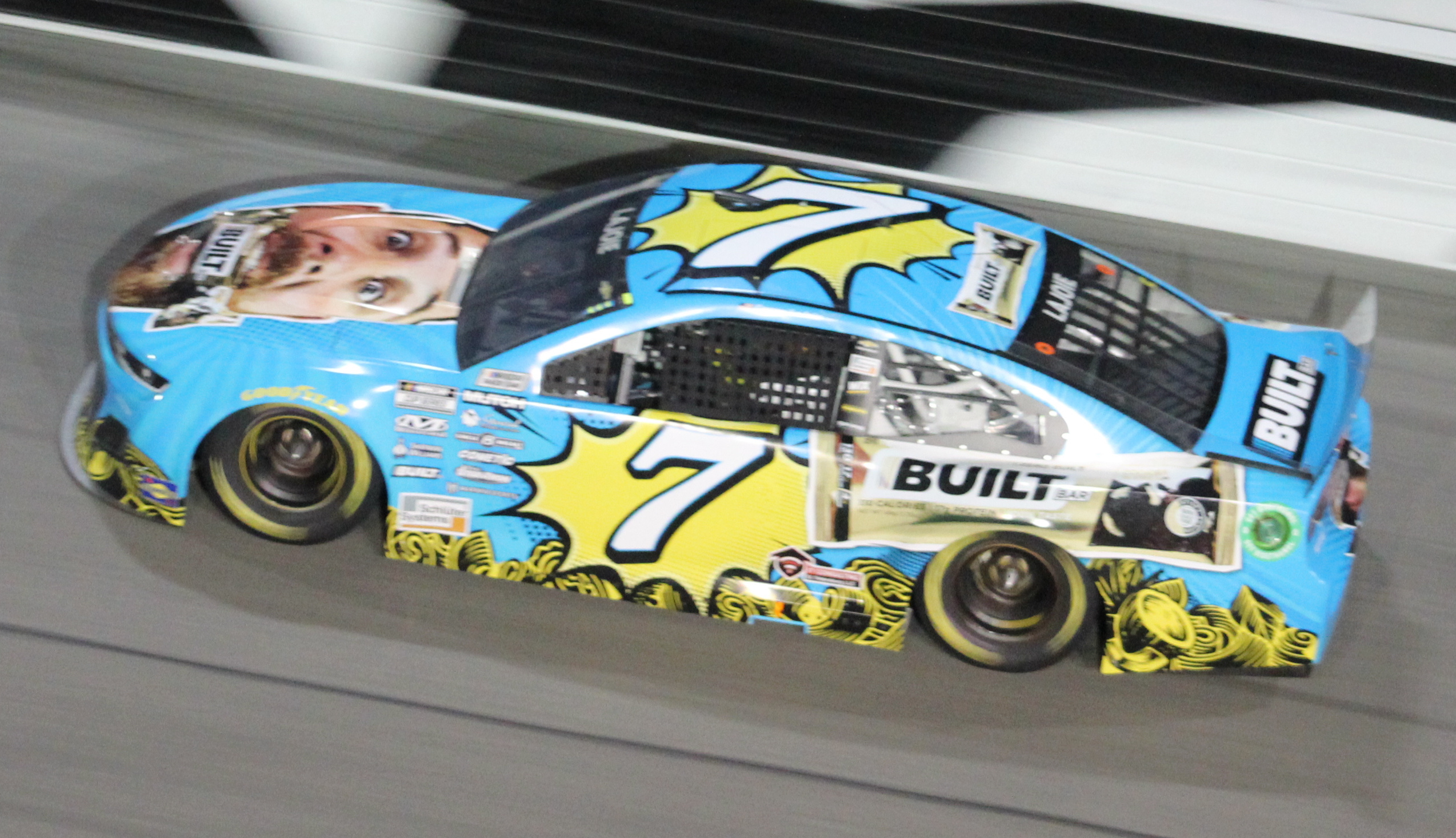
LaJoie racing at Daytona International Speedway in 2021

LaJoie moved to Spire Motorsports' No. 7 on a multi-year agreement beginning in 2021. LaJoie missed the FireKeepers Casino 400 due to COVID-19 protocols; LaJoie was close to a person testing positive for COVID-19 from his Stacking Pennies podcast studio while he was unvaccinated at the time.

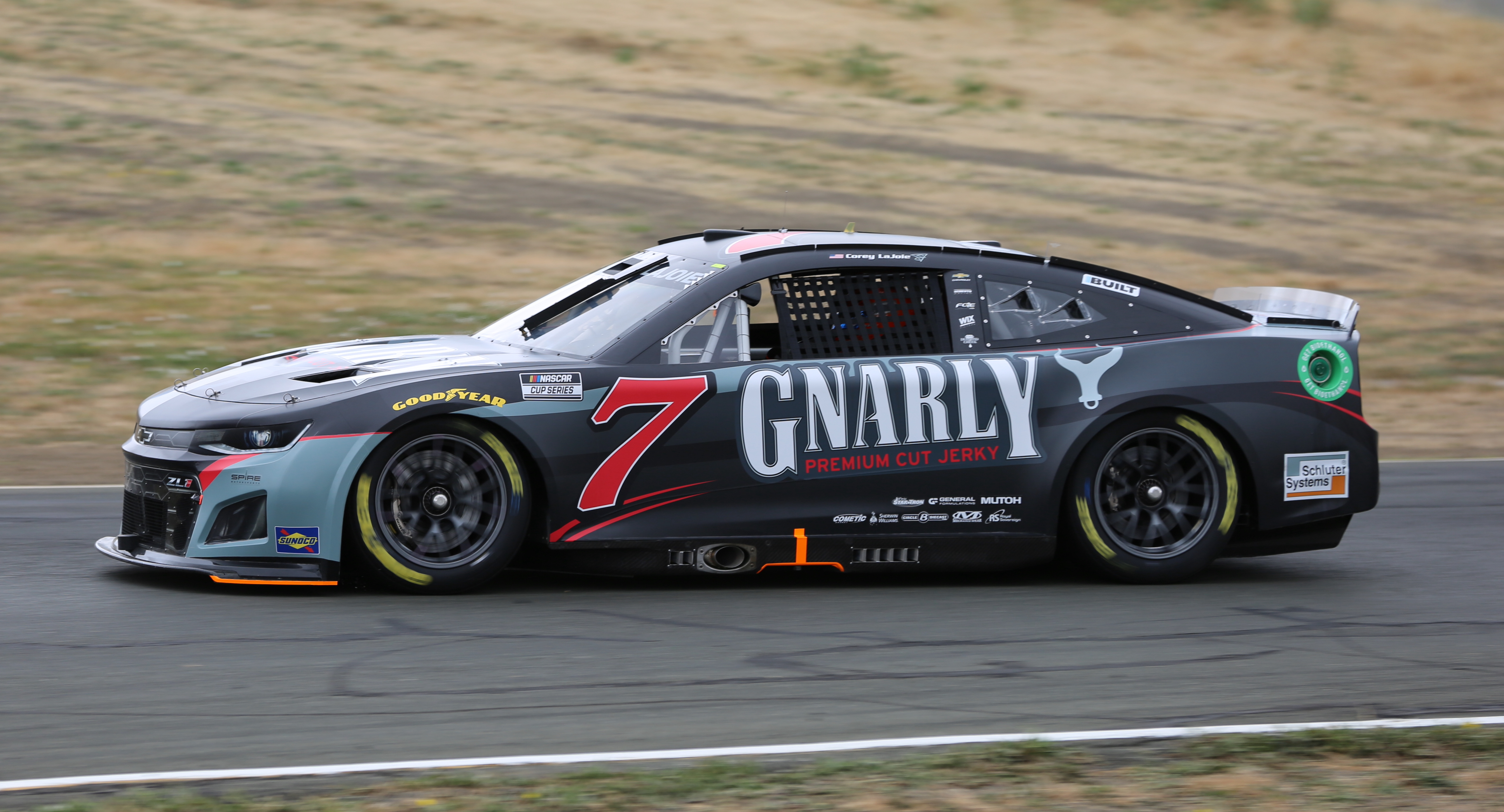
LaJoie’s No. 7 car at Sonoma Raceway in 2022

On March 15, 2022, crew chief Ryan Sparks was suspended for four races due to a tire and wheel loss during the 2022 Ruoff Mortgage 500 at Phoenix. At Atlanta, LaJoie led a career-best 19 laps and was on his way to claiming his first career win with two laps to go when Chase Elliott overtook him and blocked him on the high side, causing him to brush the wall and spin before colliding with Kurt Busch and finishing the race in 21st place.

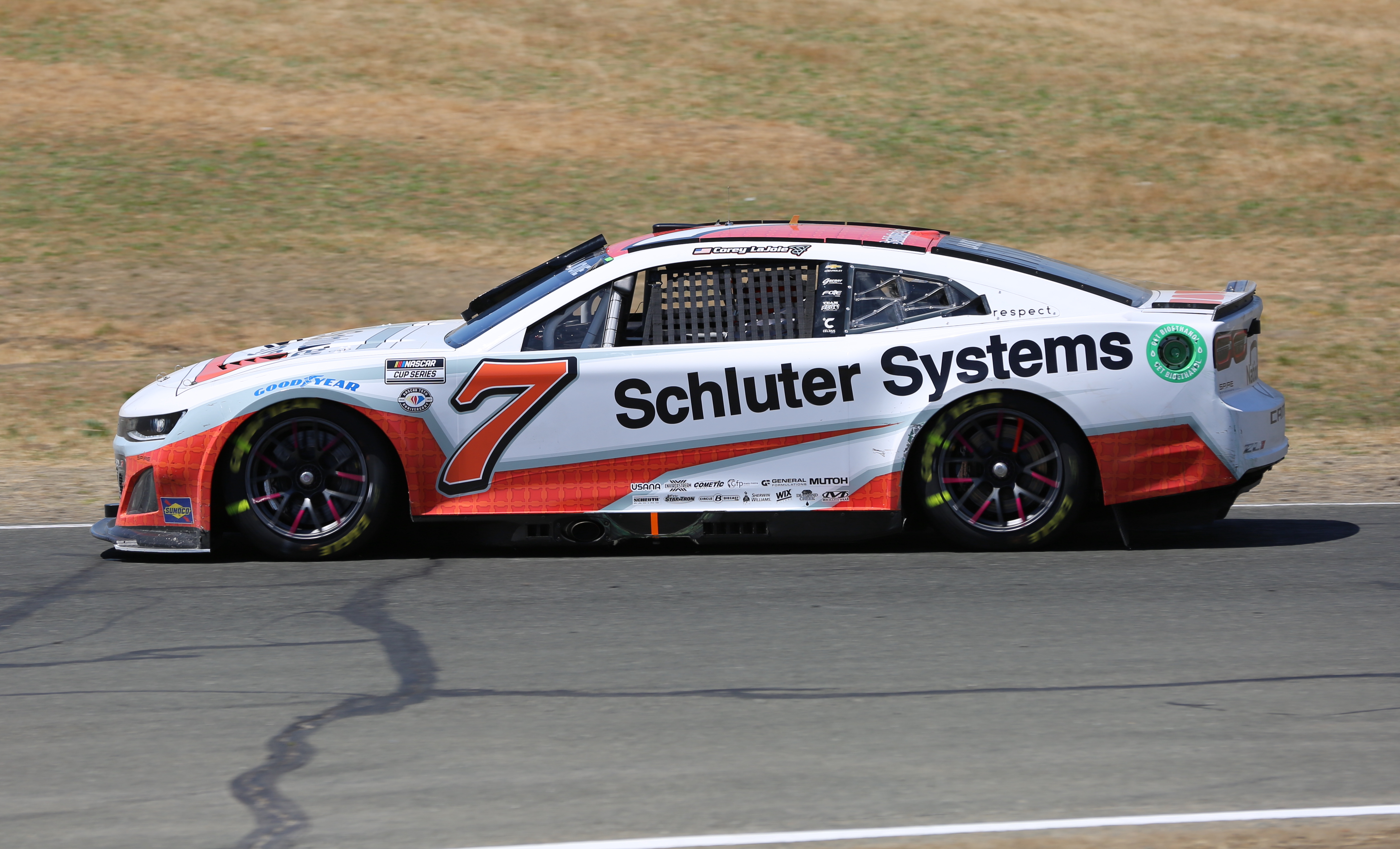
LaJoie at Sonoma Raceway in 2023.

LaJoie started the 2023 season with a 16th-place finish at the 2023 Daytona 500. He showed huge improvement over the past season with more consistent top-20 and top-30 finishes. On May 30, LaJoie was announced as the substitute driver of the Hendrick Motorsports No. 9 at Gateway after Chase Elliott was suspended for one race for intentionally wrecking Denny Hamlin at Charlotte. Carson Hocevar filled in for the No. 7, making his Cup Series debut. He finished 25th in the points standings, his highest points finish in his career, and was the only driver to not have had a single DNF throughout the 2023 season.

From 2020 to 2023, LaJoie was represented by Athelo Group, a sports agency based out of Stamford, Connecticut. In 2024, he signed with KHI Management.

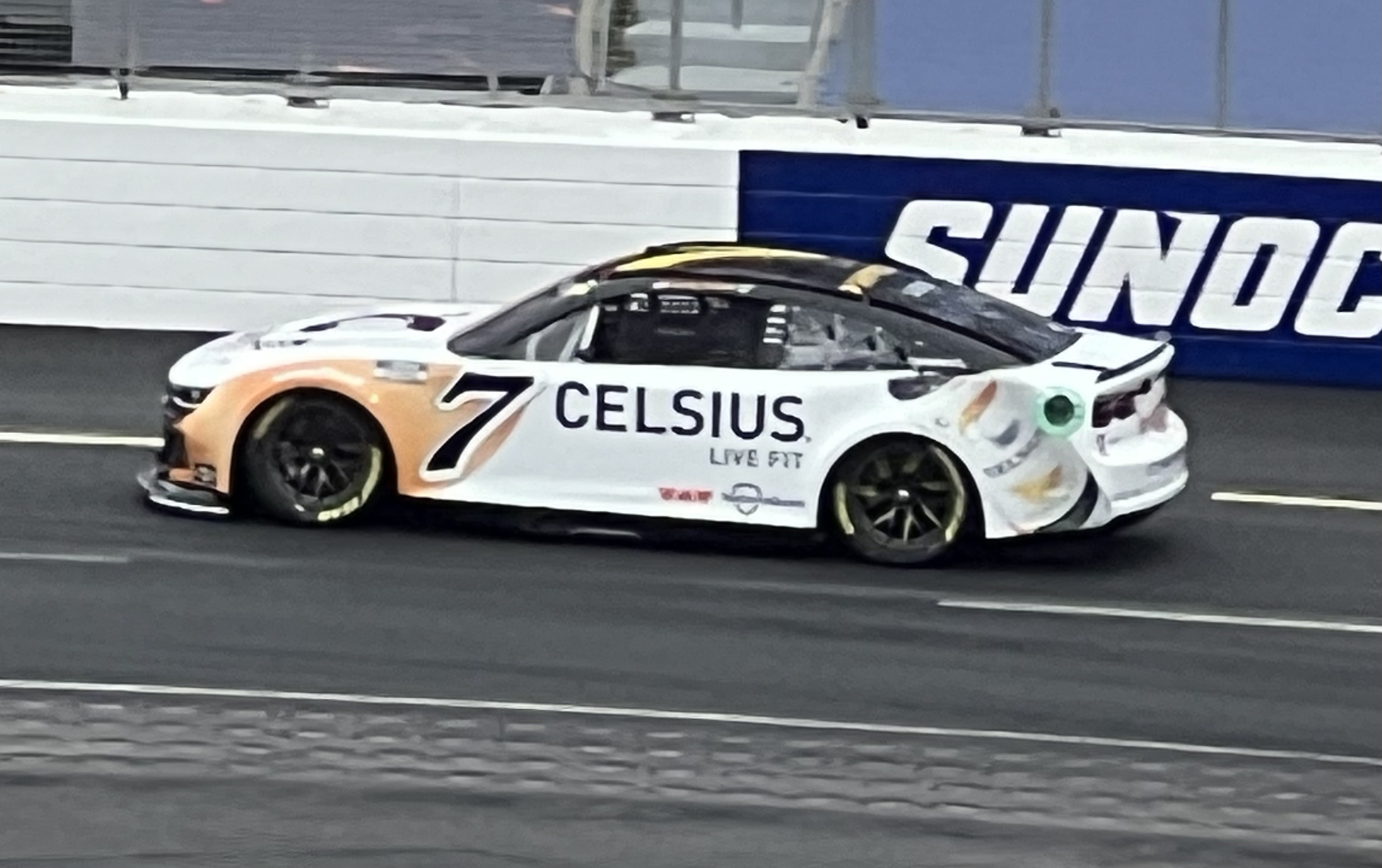
LaJoie during the 2024 Busch Light Clash at The Coliseum.

On April 21, 2024, at Talladega Superspeedway, LaJoie was attempting to avoid an accident on the last lap of the race through the tri-oval when he got turned by both Ryan Preece and Carson Hocevar after those two made contact, which shot them both up into LaJoie. LaJoie spun up the track into Josh Berry and ramped onto Berry's car, and LaJoie's car got turned over coming to the checkered flag, and LaJoie finished the race with his car on its side, scoring in 18th. A few feet after the line, LaJoie's car rolled over back onto its wheels. On July 25, LaJoie announced he was parting ways with Spire at the end of the 2024 season. At Michigan the same year, LaJoie would be involved in another flip. Going down the backstretch, LaJoie pulled to the inside of Noah Gragson to attempt a pass following several laps of intense racing between the two. LaJoie made slight contact with Gragson's left rear, but enough to send LaJoie into a spin. The car caught air on the apron of the track, blew over onto its roof, and slid upside down for some time. After glancing off the inside wall, the car continued to slide inverted until digging into the grass on the inside of turn 3, launching it into a barrel roll, before the car finally came to rest upright in the grass. Fortunately, LaJoie would climb out of his car unhurt. LaJoie became the first Cup Series driver to flip twice in one season since Rusty Wallace in 1993. The flip was the second in the same spot of that race weekend, following Kyle Sieg's in the NASCAR Xfinity Series race the preceding Saturday. Following LaJoie's incident, NASCAR implemented a new side air deflector for the upcoming Coke Zero Sugar 400. LaJoie would score a top-ten at Darlington, his first ever at a non-drafting track, in the regular season finale, but still finished outside of Playoff contention. The next week at Atlanta in the Playoff opener, LaJoie would finish 15th after narrowly avoiding a multi-car accident in turn 4 on the final lap. At Watkins Glen, LaJoie would make contact with Kyle Busch on lap 1 in the bus stop chicane, causing a pileup, but he would go on to run in the top-five the majority of the race, scoring yet another top-ten finish, finishing eighth. Lajoie’s final race with Spire would be at the Bristol night race, where he would DNF on lap 330 after getting loose in turn 2 and hitting the outside wall.

==== 2024–2025: Rick Ware Racing; return to Spire ====
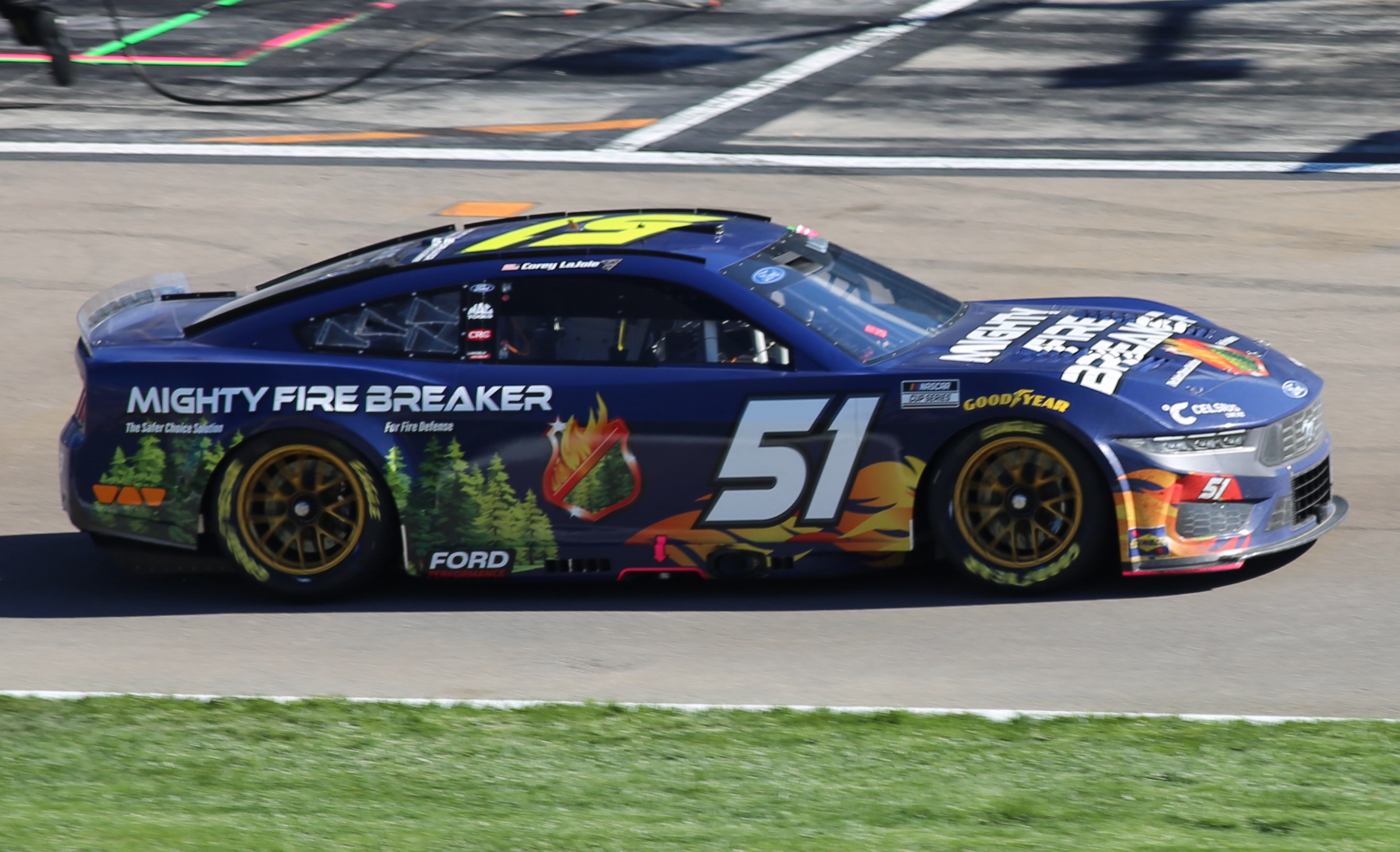
LaJoie's No. 51 car at Las Vegas Motor Speedway in 2024

On September 20, 2024, it was announced that LaJoie would move to the Rick Ware Racing No. 51, while Justin Haley would replace him in the No. 7 for the remainder of the 2024 season starting with Kansas.

On January 27, 2025, it was announced LaJoie would run a part-time schedule for RWR that year in the No. 01 car (formerly No. 15), starting with the 2025 Daytona 500. In addition to that announcement, it was announced he, along with Danielle Trotta, would serve as analysts for Amazon Prime Video's coverage of the Cup Series season later in the year, as well as starting his Stacking Pennies Performance brand. In Speedweeks, LaJoie raced himself into the race with a sixth place finish in Duel 2 and would start 12th in the 500, he would go on to stay up front nearly all race, leading the race with eight laps to go and found himself in position to win the race leading the inside line going down the backstretch on the white flag in third place, but would ultimately be taken out by an ill timed block by Cole Custer which set off the big one.

On June 2, 2025, it was announced that LaJoie would return to Spire Motorsports to run nine Craftsman Truck Series races later that season. LaJoie drove Spire's No. 07 to a fifth-place finish at Michigan. On August 11, 2025 Spire announced that LaJoie would drive their No. 77 for the rest of the season starting at Richmond after Andrés Pérez de Lara departed to join Niece Motorsports. LaJoie would once again finish fifth at Richmond.

==== 2026: RFK Racing and Kaulig Racing ====
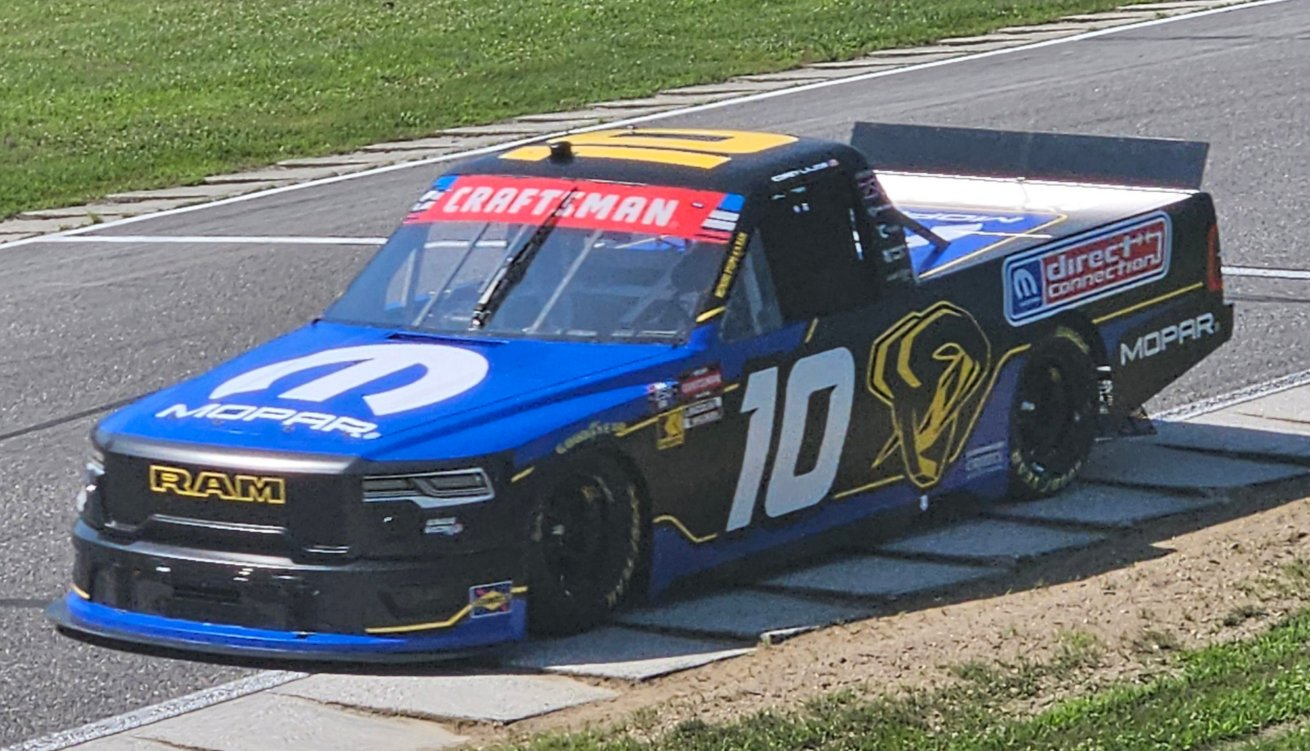
LaJoie's No. 10 truck at Lime Rock Park in 2026

On January 8, 2026, it was revealed that LaJoie would replace Brad Keselowski in the Cook Out Clash at Bowman Gray Stadium, after Keselowski suffered a broken leg during a skiing trip a month prior. Two weeks after the announcement, it was announced that LaJoie would attempt to qualify for the Daytona 500, in the No. 99 car, the first time that number was used by RFK since 2016.

In his Duel race, RFK dominated the majority of the race, seeking to help LaJoie clinch among the "Open" cars, as he had not qualified for the race. Unfortunately for LaJoie, a last-lap wreck would end his chances of making the race.

In the Craftsman Truck Series, LaJoie ran in the No. 75 Chevrolet Silverado for Henderson Motorsports in the season-opening race at Daytona. After being absent the next two races, LaJoie ran in the No. 25 RAM for Kaulig Racing at Darlington. LaJoie was scheduled to run Rockingham in the No. 25, until it was announced he would pilot the No. 10 for the rest of the season, replacing Daniel Dye, who was suspended and released from Kaulig.

== Personal life ==
LaJoie is a Christian. His father, Randy LaJoie, is a two-time NASCAR Busch Series champion, winning the series title in 1996 and 1997.

== Other ventures ==
Stacking Pennies Composites
- Type: Private
- Industry: Seating, manufacturing, racecar bodies
- Founded: October 9, 2025; 13 months ago in Concord, North Carolina, U.S.
- Founders: Corey LaJoie
- Headquarters: Concord, North Carolina, U.S.
- Products: Carbon fiber racing seats, Racecar bodies
- Owners: Corey LaJoie
- Parent: The Joie of Seating
- Website: www.stackingpennies.com

Stacking Pennies Composites is a carbon composite company based in Concord, North Carolina, founded in 2025 by NASCAR driver Corey LaJoie. The company most notably manufacturers carbon fiber racing seats in partnership with its parent company The Joie of Seating as well as also manufacturing carbon fiber racecar bodies independently.

Stacking Pennies Composites wordmark logo

The company is one of the only manufacturers in short track racing to manufacturer carbon fiber seats. LaJoie made his first sketch of the X.01 seat on a napkin, and later that day with a 3D Printer on November 3, 2025. It was introduced in July 2026 and made its competitive debut with Dale Earnhardt Jr. and GMS Race Cars in a CARS Pro Late Model Tour race at Florence Motor Speedway on September 4, 2026, going from concept to product in only 8 months time.

=== Podcasts ===
LaJoie was a host of Motor Racing Network's Sunday Money podcast alongside Daryl Motte and MRN's Lauren Fox, talking about racing and current events; LaJoie and Fox were classmates in high school. In 2021, he began hosting his own podcast Stacking Pennies on NASCAR.com.

== Motorsports career results ==
=== Racing career summary ===
Season	Series	Team	Races	Wins	Top 5	Top 10	Points	Position
2009	NASCAR Camping World East Series	Randy Lajoie Racing	2	0	1	1	341	34th
2009	NASCAR Camping World East Series	Marsh Racing	1	0	0	0	341	34th
2009	ARCA Re/Max Series	Kevin Harvick Inc.	1	0	0	0	365	73rd
2010	NASCAR Whelen Southern Modified Tour	Roger Hill	1	1	1	1	185	28th
2010	NASCAR K&N Pro Series East	Randy Lajoie Racing	4	0	2	3	668	21st
2011	NASCAR Whelen Southern Modified Tour	Glenn Ryerson	2	0	0	2	288	26th
2011	NASCAR K&N Pro Series East	Randy Lajoie Racing	12	0	4	6	1548	8th
2012	NASCAR Whelen Southern Modified Tour	Phillip Smith	1	0	0	0	57	30th
2012	NASCAR Whelen Southern Modified Tour	Randy Lajoie Racing	1	0	0	0	57	30th
2012	NASCAR Whelen Modified Tour	Randy Lajoie Racing	1	0	0	0	17	51st
2012	NASCAR K&N Pro Series East	Randy Lajoie Racing	14	5	10	10	522	**2nd**
2013	NASCAR K&N Pro Series East	Spraker Racing	1	0	0	0	35	54th
2013	NASCAR K&N Pro Series East	Randy Lajoie Racing	1	0	0	0	35	54th
2013	ARCA Racing Series	Randy Lajoie Racing	5	3	4	4	1295	22nd
2013	NASCAR Nationwide Series	Richard Petty Motorsports	1	0	0	0	10	84th
2014	NASCAR Camping World Truck Series	RBR Enterprises	2	0	0	1	61	48th
2014	NASCAR Nationwide Series	Biagi-DenBeste Racing	5	0	0	0	0	NC†
2014	NASCAR Sprint Cup Series	Randy Humphrey Racing	2	0	0	0	0	NC†
2015	NASCAR Whelen Modified Tour	Rob Fuller Motorsports	2	0	0	0	46	45th
2015	NASCAR K&N Pro Series East	Precision Performance Motorsports	1	0	0	1	37	44th
2016	NASCAR K&N Pro Series East	Ranier Racing with MDM	1	1	1	1	47	43rd
2016	NASCAR Xfinity Series	JGL Racing	10	0	0	2	177	31st
2017	NASCAR Xfinity Series	JGL Racing	6	0	0	0	23	58th
2017	Monster Energy NASCAR Cup Series	BK Racing	32	0	0	0	0	NC†
2018	CARS Super Late Model Tour	Fat Head Racing	2	0	0	2	26	35th
2018	Monster Energy NASCAR Cup Series	TriStar Motorsports	23	0	0	0	144	34th
2019	Monster Energy NASCAR Cup Series	Go Fas Racing	36	0	0	2	401	29th
2020	NASCAR Cup Series	Go Fas Racing	36	0	0	1	408	30th
2021	NASCAR Cup Series	Spire Motorsports	35	0	0	1	448	29th
2022	NASCAR Whelen Modified Tour	Michelle Davini	1	0	0	1	83	41st
2022	NASCAR Whelen Modified Tour	Mike Curb	1	1	1	1	83	41st
2022	NASCAR Cup Series	Spire Motorsports	36	0	1	1	466	31st
2023	NASCAR Whelen Modified Tour	Rob Fuller	1	0	0	1	32	69th
2023	ARCA Menards Series	Spraker Racing Enterprises	1	0	0	0	31	91st
2023	NASCAR Craftsman Truck Series	Spire Motorsports	2	0	0	0	0	NC†
2023	NASCAR Cup Series	Spire Motorsports	35	0	2	3	603	25th
2023	NASCAR Cup Series	Hendrick Motorsports	1	0	0	0	603	25th
2024	NASCAR Craftsman Truck Series	Spire Motorsports	1	0	0	0	0	NC†
2024	NASCAR Cup Series	Spire Motorsports	29	0	1	3	489	33rd
2024	NASCAR Cup Series	Rick Ware Racing	7	0	0	0	489	33rd
2025	CARS Late Model Stock Car Tour	KP Speed Motorsports	1	0	0	0	14	97th
2025	NASCAR Whelen Modified Tour	Mike Curb	2	0	1	1	70	44th
2025	NASCAR Craftsman Truck Series	Spire Motorsports	9	0	3	7	282	24th
2025	NASCAR Cup Series	Rick Ware Racing	4	0	0	0	0	NC†
2026	NASCAR Craftsman Truck Series	Henderson Motorsports	1	0	0	0	363	21st
2026	NASCAR Craftsman Truck Series	Kaulig Racing	21	0	0	4	363	21st

^{†} As Lajoie was a guest driver, he was ineligible for championship points.

=== NASCAR ===
(key) (Bold – Pole position awarded by qualifying time. Italics – Pole position earned by points standings or practice time. * – Most laps led.)

==== Cup Series ====
NASCAR Cup Series results
Year	Team	No.	Make	1	2	3	4	5	6	7	8	9	10	11	12	13	14	15	16	17	18	19	20	21	22	23	24	25	26	27	28	29	30	31	32	33	34	35	36	NCSC	Pts	Ref
2014	Randy Humphrey Racing	77	Ford	DAY	PHO	LVS	BRI	CAL	MAR	TEX	DAR	RCH	TAL	KAN	CLT	DOV	POC	MCH	SON	KEN	DAY	NHA	IND	POC	GLN	MCH	BRI	ATL	RCH	CHI	NHA; 41	DOV	KAN	CLT; 35	TAL	MAR	TEX	PHO	HOM	70th	0^{1}	
2017	BK Racing	83	Toyota	DAY; 24	ATL; 34	LVS; 39	PHO; 38	CAL; 30	MAR; 28	TEX; 32	BRI; 24	RCH; 32	TAL; 27	KAN; 27	CLT; 32	DOV	POC; 28	MCH; 30	SON								BRI; 28		RCH; 29											51st	0^{2}	
2017	BK Racing	23	Toyota																	DAY; 11	KEN	NHA; 31	IND; 40	POC; 25	GLN; 33	MCH; 31		DAR; 28		CHI; 36	NHA; 27	DOV; 34	CLT; 28	TAL	KAN; 27	MAR; 33	TEX; 39	PHO; 31	HOM; 31	51st	0^{2}	
2018	TriStar Motorsports	72	Chevy	DAY; 40	ATL	LVS	PHO; 37	CAL	MAR	TEX	BRI; 25	RCH	TAL	DOV; 38	KAN; 24	CLT; 26	POC	MCH; 27	SON	CHI; 34	DAY; 31	KEN; 31	NHA; 27	POC; 39	GLN	MCH; 40	BRI; 34	DAR; 27	IND; 27	LVS; 16	RCH; 32	ROV	DOV; 30	TAL; 32	KAN; 34	MAR	TEX; 40	PHO	HOM; 34	34th	144	
2019	Go Fas Racing	32	Ford	DAY; 18	ATL; 29	LVS; 27	PHO; 26	CAL; 31	MAR; 33	TEX; 28	BRI; 34	RCH; 26	TAL; 11	DOV; 29	KAN; 22	CLT; 12	POC; 36	MCH; 23	SON; 32	CHI; 30	DAY; 6	KEN; 28	NHA; 23	POC; 26	GLN; 34	MCH; 21	BRI; 24	DAR; 36	IND; 19	LVS; 28	RCH; 29	ROV; 27	DOV; 28	TAL; 7	KAN; 28	MAR; 18	TEX; 38	PHO; 35	HOM; 31	29th	401	
2020	Go Fas Racing	32	Ford	DAY; 8	LVS; 16	CAL; 29	PHO; 27	DAR; 31	DAR; 24	CLT; 23	CLT; 19	BRI; 32	ATL; 27	MAR; 18	HOM; 29	TAL; 16	POC; 23	POC; 21	IND; 39	KEN; 28	TEX; 16	KAN; 21	NHA; 35	MCH; 22	MCH; 22	DRC; 32	DOV; 29	DOV; 23	DAY; 21	DAR; 37	RCH; 27	BRI; 33	LVS; 27	TAL; 28	ROV; 27	KAN; 23	TEX; 25	MAR; 25	PHO; 38	30th	408	
2021	Spire Motorsports	7	Chevy	DAY; 9	DRC; 31	HOM; 36	LVS; 37	PHO; 27	ATL; 29	BRD; 38	MAR; 37	RCH; 21	TAL; 22	KAN; 27	DAR; 22	DOV; 26	COA; 20	CLT; 19	SON; 18	NSH; 15	POC; 36	POC; 23	ROA; 21	ATL; 22	NHA; 23	GLN; 24	IRC; 16	MCH	DAY; 16	DAR; 15	RCH; 29	BRI; 26	LVS; 30	TAL; 22	ROV; 35	TEX; 20	KAN; 25	MAR; 21	PHO; 32	29th	448	
2022	Spire Motorsports	7	Chevy	DAY; 14	CAL; 28	LVS; 15	PHO; 36	ATL; 5	COA; 36	RCH; 31	MAR; 32	BRD; 19	TAL; 14	DOV; 18	DAR; 35	KAN; 19	CLT; 35	GTW; 36	SON; 34	NSH; 20	ROA; 34	ATL; 21	NHA; 32	POC; 19	IRC; 18	MCH; 19	RCH; 28	GLN; 27	DAY; 30	DAR; 24	KAN; 33	BRI; 15	TEX; 14	TAL; 35	ROV; 12	LVS; 24	HOM; 23	MAR; 21	PHO; 18	31st	466	
2023	Spire Motorsports	7	Chevy	DAY; 16	CAL; 14	LVS; 20	PHO; 26	ATL; 4	COA; 11	RCH; 21	BRD; 30	MAR; 26	TAL; 25	DOV; 14	KAN; 20	DAR; 24	CLT; 17		SON; 20	NSH; 20	CSC; 14	ATL; 31	NHA; 33	POC; 27	RCH; 32	MCH; 15	IRC; 29	GLN; 20	DAY; 10	DAR; 22	KAN; 22	BRI; 25	TEX; 26	TAL; 4	ROV; 17	LVS; 19	HOM; 20	MAR; 22	PHO; 31	25th	603	
2023	Hendrick Motorsports	9	Chevy															GTW; 21																						25th	603	
2024	Spire Motorsports	7	Chevy	DAY; 4	ATL; 13	LVS; 32	PHO; 33	BRI; 21	COA; 24	RCH; 36	MAR; 32	TEX; 22	TAL; 18	DOV; 21	KAN; 26	DAR; 16	CLT; 35	GTW; 32	SON; 11	IOW; 21	NHA; 23	NSH; 20	CSC; 27	POC; 19	IND; 14	RCH; 34	MCH; 32	DAY; 34	DAR; 9	ATL; 15	GLN; 8	BRI; 36								33rd	489	
2024	Rick Ware Racing	51	Ford																														KAN; 15	TAL; 18	ROV; 37	LVS; 14	HOM; 35	MAR; 35	PHO; 32	33rd	489	
2025	Rick Ware Racing	01	Ford	DAY; 22	ATL; 38	COA	PHO	LVS	HOM	MAR	DAR	BRI; 34	TAL	TEX	KAN	CLT	NSH	MCH	MXC	POC	ATL; 39	CSC	SON	DOV	IND	IOW	GLN	RCH	DAY	DAR	GTW	BRI	NHA	KAN	ROV	LVS	TAL	MAR	PHO	52nd	0^{1}	
2026	RFK Racing	99	Ford	DAY; DNQ	ATL	COA	PHO	LVS	DAR	MAR	BRI	KAN	TAL	TEX	GLN	CLT	NSH	MCH	POC	COR	SON	CHI	ATL	NWS	IND	IOW	RCH	NHA	DAY	DAR	GTW	BRI	KAN	LVS	CLT	PHO	TAL	MAR	HOM	56th	0^{1}	

===== Daytona 500 =====
Year	Team	Manufacturer	Start	Finish
2017	BK Racing	Toyota	31	24
2018	TriStar Motorsports	Chevrolet	32	40
2019	Go Fas Racing	Ford	32	18
2020	Go Fas Racing	Ford	36	8
2021	Spire Motorsports	Chevrolet	16	9
2022	Spire Motorsports	Chevrolet	24	14
2023	Spire Motorsports	Chevrolet	12	16
2024	Spire Motorsports	Chevrolet	29	4
2025	Rick Ware Racing	Ford	12	22
2026	RFK Racing	Ford	DNQ	

==== Xfinity Series ====
NASCAR Xfinity Series results
Year	Team	No.	Make	1	2	3	4	5	6	7	8	9	10	11	12	13	14	15	16	17	18	19	20	21	22	23	24	25	26	27	28	29	30	31	32	33	NXSC	Pts	Ref
2013	Richard Petty Motorsports	9	Ford	DAY	PHO	LVS	BRI	CAL	TEX	RCH	TAL	DAR	CLT	DOV	IOW	MCH	ROA	KEN	DAY	NHA	CHI	IND	IOW	GLN	MOH	BRI	ATL	RCH	CHI	KEN	DOV	KAN	CLT	TEX	PHO	HOM; 34	84th	10	
2014	Biagi-DenBeste Racing	98	Ford	DAY	PHO	LVS	BRI	CAL	TEX	DAR	RCH	TAL	IOW	CLT	DOV	MCH	ROA	KEN; 16	DAY	NHA	CHI	IND	IOW	GLN	MOH	BRI	ATL	RCH	CHI	KEN	DOV	KAN; 26	CLT; 24	TEX; 32	PHO	HOM; 37	106th	0^{1}	
2016	JGL Racing	24	Toyota	DAY	ATL; 23	LVS; 19	PHO	CAL; 18	TEX	BRI	RCH	TAL	DOV	CLT	POC	MCH	IOW	DAY; 30	KEN	NHA; 37	IND	IOW	GLN	MOH	BRI; 10	ROA	DAR	RCH	CHI	KEN	DOV; 6	CLT	KAN	TEX; 23	PHO; 33	HOM; 35	31st	177	
2017	JGL Racing	24	Toyota	DAY	ATL; 16	LVS	PHO	CAL; 18	TEX	BRI	RCH	TAL	CLT	DOV	POC	MCH	IOW	DAY	KEN	NHA	IND	IOW	GLN	MOH	BRI	ROA	DAR	RCH	CHI	KEN	DOV; 15	CLT; 17	KAN	TEX	PHO; 22	HOM; 15	58th	23^{2}	

==== Craftsman Truck Series ====
NASCAR Craftsman Truck Series results
Year	Team	No.	Make	1	2	3	4	5	6	7	8	9	10	11	12	13	14	15	16	17	18	19	20	21	22	23	24	25	NCTC	Pts	Ref
2014	RBR Enterprises	92	Ford	DAY	MAR	KAN	CLT	DOV	TEX	GTW	KEN; 17	IOW	ELD	POC	MCH	BRI; 10	MSP	CHI	NHA	LVS	TAL	MAR	TEX	PHO	HOM				48th	61	
2023	Spire Motorsports	7	Chevy	DAY; 23*	LVS	ATL	COA	TEX	BRD	MAR	KAN	DAR; 16	NWS	CLT	GTW	NSH	MOH	POC	RCH	IRP	MLW	KAN	BRI	TAL	HOM	PHO			106th	0^{1}	
2024	Spire Motorsports	7	Chevy	DAY; 20	ATL	LVS	BRI	COA	MAR	TEX	KAN	DAR	NWS	CLT	GTW	NSH	POC	IRP	RCH	MLW	BRI	KAN	TAL	HOM	MAR	PHO			87th	0^{1}	
2025	Spire Motorsports	07	Chevy	DAY	ATL	LVS	HOM	MAR	BRI	CAR	TEX	KAN	NWS	CLT	NSH	MCH; 5	POC	LRP	IRP	GLN									24th	282	
2025	Spire Motorsports	77	Chevy																		RCH; 5	DAR; 20	BRI; 9	NHA; 8	ROV; 18	TAL; 8	MAR; 5	PHO; 7	24th	282	
2026	Henderson Motorsports	75	Chevy	DAY; 34	ATL	STP																							21st	363	
2026	Kaulig Racing	25	Ram				DAR; 21																						21st	363	
2026	Kaulig Racing	10	Ram					CAR; 7	BRI; 29	TEX; 25	GLN; 12	DOV; 8	CLT; 12	NSH; 22	MCH; 29	COR; 35	LRP; 28	NWS; 29	IRP; 24	RCH; 21	NHA; 15	BRI; 18	KAN; 10	CLT; 16	PHO; 17	TAL; 33	MAR; 20	HOM; 10	21st	363	

^{*} Season still in progress
^{1} Ineligible for series points
^{2} LaJoie began the 2017 season racing for Cup Series points, but switched to Xfinity Series points before the race at Homestead–Miami Speedway

=== ARCA Menards Series ===
(key) (Bold – Pole position awarded by qualifying time. Italics – Pole position earned by points standings or practice time. * – Most laps led.)

ARCA Menards Series results
Year	Team	No.	Make	1	2	3	4	5	6	7	8	9	10	11	12	13	14	15	16	17	18	19	20	21	AMSC	Pts	Ref
2009	Kevin Harvick Inc.	33	Chevy	DAY	SLM	CAR	TAL	KEN	TOL	POC	MCH	MFD	IOW	KEN	BLN	POC	ISF	CHI	TOL	DSF	NJE	SLM	KAN	CAR; 23	73rd	365	
2013	Randy LaJoie Racing	17	Ford	DAY	MOB	SLM	TAL	TOL	ELK	POC	MCH	ROA	WIN	CHI; 1	NJE	POC; 1	BLN	ISF	MAD	DSF	IOW; 4	SLM	KEN; 1*	KAN; 25	22nd	1295	
2023	Spraker Racing Enterprises	63	Chevy	DAY	PHO	TAL	KAN	CLT	BLN	ELK	MOH	IOW	POC	MCH	IRP	**GLN**; 15	ISF	MLW	DSF	KAN	BRI	SLM	TOL		91st	31	

==== K&N Pro Series East ====
NASCAR K&N Pro Series East results
Year	Team	No.	Make	1	2	3	4	5	6	7	8	9	10	11	12	13	14	NKNPSEC	Pts	Ref
2009	Randy LaJoie Racing	07	Ford	GRE	TRI	IOW	SBO	GLN	NHA	TMP; 19	ADI	LRP		DOV; 3				34th	341	
2009	Marsh Racing	36	Chevy										NHA; 31					34th	341	
2010	Randy LaJoie Racing	07	Ford	GRE; DNQ	SBO			NHA; 8	LRP	LEE	JFC	NHA; 13	DOV; 2					21st	668	
2010	Randy LaJoie Racing	70	Ford			IOW; 4	MAR											21st	668	
2011	Randy LaJoie Racing	07	Ford	GRE; 20	SBO; 29	RCH; 3		BGS; 2		LGY; 8		COL; 17	**GRE**; 13					8th	1548	
2011	Randy LaJoie Racing	07	Dodge				IOW; 20		JFC; 5		NHA; 3			NHA; 6	DOV; 30			8th	1548	
2012	Randy LaJoie Racing	07	Ford	BRI; 22	GRE; 2	RCH; 3	IOW; 14	BGS; 1*	JFC; 4	LGY; 1	CNB; 23	COL; 17	IOW; 1*	NHA; 2		GRE; 1		2nd	522	
2012	Randy LaJoie Racing	07	Toyota												DOV; 1		CAR; 2	2nd	522	
2013	Randy LaJoie Racing	07	Ford	BRI	GRE	FIF	RCH; 31											54th	35	
2013	Spraker Racing	37	Chevy					BGS; 22	IOW	LGY	COL	IOW	VIR	GRE	NHA	DOV	RAL	54th	35	
2015	Precision Performance Motorsports	12	Toyota	NSM	GRE	BRI	IOW	BGS	LGY	COL	NHA	IOW	GLN	MOT	VIR	RCH	DOV; 7	44th	37	
2016	Ranier Racing with MDM	41	Chevy	NSM	MOB	GRE	BRI	VIR	DOM	STA	COL	NHA; 1	IOW	GLN	GRE	NJM	DOV	43rd	47	

==== Whelen Modified Tour ====
NASCAR Whelen Modified Tour results
Year	Car owner	No.	Make	1	2	3	4	5	6	7	8	9	10	11	12	13	14	15	16	17	18	NWMTC	Pts	Ref
2012	Randy LaJoie Racing	17	Chevy	TMP	STA; 27	MON	STA	WAT	NHA	STA	TMP	BRI	TMP	RIV	NHA	STA	TMP					51st	17	
2015	Rob Fuller Motorsports	15	Chevy	TMP; 28	STA	WAT	STA	TMP; 14	RIV	NHA	MON	STA	TMP	BRI	RIV	NHA	STA	TMP				45th	46	
2022	Michelle Davini	17		NSM	RCH	RIV	LEE	JEN	MND	RIV	WAL	NHA; 9	CLM	TMP	LGY	OSW	RIV	TMP				41st	83	
2022	Mike Curb	53																	MAR; 1*			41st	83	
2023	Rob Fuller	1		NSM	RCH	MON	RIV	LEE	SEE	RIV	WAL	NHA; 7	LMP	THO	LGY	OSW	MON	RIV	NWS	THO	MAR	69th	32	
2025	Mike Curb	77	Chevy	NSM	THO	NWS; 14	SEE	RIV	WMM	LMP	MON	MON	THO	RCH; 5	OSW	NHA	RIV	THO	MAR			44th	70	

==== Whelen Southern Modified Tour ====
NASCAR Whelen Southern Modified Tour results
Year	Car owner	No.	Make	1	2	3	4	5	6	7	8	9	10	11	12	13	14	NSWMTC	Pts	Ref
2010	Roger Hill	19	Pontiac	ATL; 1	CRW	SBO	CRW	BGS	BRI	CRW	LGY	TRI	CLT					28th	185	
2011	Glenn Ryerson	71	Chevy	CRW	HCY	SBO	CRW	CRW; 6	BGS	BRI; 9	CRW	LGY	THO	TRI	CRW	CLT	CRW	26th	288	
2012	Randy LaJoie Racing	17	Chevy	CRW	CRW	SBO	CRW; 21	CRW	BGS	BRI								30th	57	
2012	Phillip Smith	1	Ford								LGY; 12*	THO	CRW	CLT				30th	57	

=== CARS Late Model Stock Car Tour ===
(key) (Bold – Pole position awarded by qualifying time. Italics – Pole position earned by points standings or practice time. * – Most laps led. ** – All laps led.)

CARS Late Model Stock Car Tour results
Year	Team	No.	Make	1	2	3	4	5	6	7	8	9	10	11	12	13	14	15	CLMSCTC	Pts	Ref
2025	KP Speed Motorsports	12	Chevy	AAS	WCS	CDL	OCS	ACE	NWS; 28	LGY	DOM	CRW	HCY	AND	FLC	SBO	TCM	NWS	97th	14	

=== CARS Super Late Model Tour ===
(key)

CARS Super Late Model Tour results
Year	Team	No.	Make	1	2	3	4	5	6	7	8	9	CSLMTC	Pts	Ref
2018	Fat Head Racing	07	Ford	MYB	NSH; 6	ROU; 7	HCY	BRI	AND	HCY	ROU	SBO	35th	26	

Achievements
Preceded by Inaugural race	Atlanta 150 winner 2010	Succeeded by Not held
Preceded by Eric Goodale	Virginia is for Racing Lovers 200 winner 2022	Succeeded by Ryan Preece
