= 2012 NASCAR Whelen Southern Modified Tour =

The 2012 NASCAR Whelen Southern Modified Tour was the eighth season of the NASCAR Whelen Southern Modified Tour (WSMT). It began with the Spring Classic 150 at Caraway Speedway on March 31. It ended with the UNOH Southern Slam 150 at Charlotte Motor Speedway on October 11. George Brunnhoelzl III, who entered the season as the defending Drivers' Champion, would win his third championship in the series, fifty-three points ahead of series runner up Danny Bohn.

== Schedule ==
No.	Race title	Track	Date
1	Spring Classic 150	Caraway Speedway, Asheboro, North Carolina	March 31
2	Farm Bureau Insurance 150	Caraway Speedway, Asheboro, North Carolina	April 7
3	South Boston 150	South Boston Speedway, South Boston, Virginia	April 14
4	Parking Lot Maintenance Headquarters 150	Caraway Speedway, Asheboro, North Carolina	April 21
5	Firecracker 150	Caraway Speedway, Asheboro, North Carolina	July 6
6	Strutmasters.com 199	Bowman Gray Stadium, Winston-Salem, North Carolina	August 4
7	UNOH Perfect Storm 150 (Note: The UNOH Perfect Storm 150 was held as a combined event, with competitors from the Whelen Southern Modified Tour competing along with competitors for the Whelen Modified Tour. The race was run with a series-based point distribution, where drivers received points and statistical credit for their finish relative to other drivers in their series, not to the whole field in general.)	Bristol Motor Speedway, Bristol, Tennessee	August 22
8	Newport News Shipbuilding 150	Langley Speedway, Hampton, Virginia	September 1
9	GreenPointe Energy 75	Thompson Speedway Motorsports Park, Thompson, Connecticut	September 9
10	Mid-Atlantic Shoot Out 150	Caraway Speedway, Asheboro, North Carolina	October 6
11	UNOH Southern Slam 150	Charlotte Motor Speedway, Concord, North Carolina	October 11

== Results and standings ==
=== Races ===
No.	Race	Pole position	Most laps led	Winning driver	Manufacturer
1	Spring Classic 150	George Brunnhoelzl III	George Brunnhoelzl III	George Brunnhoelzl III	Chevrolet
2	Farm Bureau Insurance 150	Tim Brown	Brian Loftin	Brian Loftin	Chevrolet
3	South Boston 150	L. W. Miller	George Brunnhoelzl III	Brandon Ward	Chevrolet
4	Parking Lot Maintenance Headquarters 150	George Brunnhoelzl III	George Brunnhoelzl III	George Brunnhoelzl III	Chevrolet
5	Firecracker 150	George Brunnhoelzl III	George Brunnhoelzl III	George Brunnhoelzl III	Chevrolet
6	Strutmasters.com 199	Burt Myers	George Brunnhoelzl III	George Brunnhoelzl III	Chevrolet
7	UNOH Perfect Storm 150	Ron Silk	Todd Szegedy	Ron Silk	Chevrolet
8	Newport News Shipbuilding 150	Danny Bohn	Corey LaJoie	Jason Myers	Ford
9	GreenPointe Energy 75	Rob Fuller	Andy Seuss	Andy Seuss	Chevrolet
10	Mid-Atlantic Shoot Out 150	George Brunnhoelzl III	Brian Loftin	Danny Bohn	Chevrolet
11	UNOH Southern Slam 150	George Brunnhoelzl III	George Brunnhoelzl III	George Brunnhoelzl III	Chevrolet

=== Drivers' championship ===
(key) Bold - Pole position awarded by time. Italics - Pole position set by final practice results or rainout. * – Most laps led.

Pos	Driver	CRW	CRW	SBO	CRW	CRW	BGS	BRI	LGY	TMP	CRW	CLT	Points
1	George Brunnhoelzl III	**1****	7	8*	**1***	**1****	1*	6	10	8	**10**	**1****	468
2	Danny Bohn	12	5	3	11	3	10	7	**15**	7	1	4	415
3	Jason Myers	2	8	20	3	5	4	20	1	12	9	4	412
4	Tim Brown	13	**4**	11	14	9	2	36	5	5	5	11	393
5	Andy Seuss	17	10	2	22	18	5	28	3	1*	8	5	388
6	Kyle Ebersole	24	12	4	4	13	6	14	6	19	3	6	381
7	Frank Fleming	14	15	12	9	11	7	29	2	16	14	8	366
8	Thomas Stinson	23	11	6	7	14	23	9	7	13	7	13	357
9	John Smith	5	17	10	19	7	16	35	4	9	9	17	357
10	Burt Myers	8	9	7	10	15	**9**	32		4	11	3	353
11	Joe Scarbrough	19	22	22	20	10	12	DNQ	9	18	6	20	310
12	Mike Speeney	16	13	25	5	8	14	10	13	17	16		309
13	Gary Putnam	21	18	15	15	12	21		8	14	12	10	294
14	Bryan Dauzat	22	21	24	8	16	15	DNQ	11			15	247
15	Brian Loftin	7	1*	23	12	4	22				2*		245
16	L. W. Miller	3	2	**5**	2	19	13						221
17	Mike Norman	20	16	17	18	20	8		14		DNQ		221
18	A. J. Winstead	15		21			24			21	13	18	177
19	Gary Fountain Sr.	9	20	26	13	21		30					163
20	Jonathan Kievman	18		13			18	11				12	154
21	Brandon Ward	4		1		2	25						148
22	Cole Powell					17	3	22		10			137
23	Daniel Hemric	6	3		6								117
24	Rich Kuiken Jr.	10	14	27	17								108
25	Renee Dupuis			9	16					20			87
26	J. R. Bertuccio	11	19	18									84
27	Ryan Preece						11	3^{1}				2	75
28	Jon McKennedy					6	17	12^{1}					65
29	Dalton Baldwin										15	14	59
30	Corey LaJoie				21				12*				57
31	Daryl Lacks			16					DNQ^{2}				53
32	Jeremy Gerstner						19				DNQ^{2}		52
33	Brian Weber						20					19	49
34	Matt Hirschman									2			42
35	Rob Fuller									**3***			41
36	Patrick Emerling		6					25^{1}					38
37	Steve Masse									6			38
38	Ryan Newman							19					37
39	Ted Christopher							26^{1}				7	37
40	Jimmy Zacharias									11			33
41	Chuck Hossfeld			14									30
42	Ken Bouchard									15			29
43	Johnny Sutton											16	28
44	Donnie Lacks			19					DNQ^{2}				25
	Carl Long							DNQ					
Drivers ineligible for NWSMT points, because at the combined event at Bristol they chose to drive for NWMT points
	Ron Silk							**1**					
	Todd Szegedy							2*					
	Justin Bonsignore							4					
	Ron Yuhas Jr.							5					
	Ken Heagy							8					
	Eric Goodale							13					
	Bryon Chew							15					
	Jamie Tomaino							16					
	Doug Coby							17					
	Eric Berndt							18					
	Eric Beers							21					
	Donny Lia							23					
	Jimmy Blewett							24					
	Ed Flemke Jr.							27					
	Wade Cole							31					
	Mike Stefanik							33					
	Rowan Pennink							34					
Pos	Driver	CRW	CRW	SBO	CRW	CRW	BGS	BRI	LGY	TMP	CRW	CLT	Points

Notes

- ^{1} – Scored points towards the Whelen Modified Tour.
- ^{2} – Daryl Lacks, Jeremy Gerstner and Donnie Lacks received championship points, despite the fact that the driver did not qualify for the race.

== See also ==
- 2012 NASCAR Sprint Cup Series
- 2012 NASCAR Nationwide Series
- 2012 NASCAR Camping World Truck Series
- 2012 ARCA Racing Series
- 2012 NASCAR Whelen Modified Tour
- 2012 NASCAR K&N Pro Series East
- 2012 NASCAR Canadian Tire Series
- 2012 NASCAR Toyota Series
- 2012 NASCAR Whelen Euro Series
