= Randy Butner =

American racing driver (born 1960)

- Born: March 21, 1960 (age 66); Pfafftown, North Carolina, U.S.

NASCAR O'Reilly Auto Parts Series career
- 5 races run over 3 years
- Best finish: 61st (1984)
- First race: 1983 DAPCO 200 (Greenville-Pickens)
- Last race: 1985 Coca-Cola 300 (North Wilkesboro)
Wins	Top tens	Poles
0	0	0
- Statistics up to date as of September 24, 2026.

Randy Butner (born March 21, 1960) is an American professional stock car racing driver who has competed in the NASCAR Busch Series and the now defunct NASCAR Whelen Southern Modified Tour.

Butner has also previously competed in the SMART Modified Tour, the ASA Southern Modified Race Tour, and the NASCAR Local Racing Series, and is a longtime competitor at Bowman Gray Stadium, having set the record for the most starts at the track in 2025.

== Motorsports results ==
=== NASCAR ===
(key) (Bold - Pole position awarded by qualifying time. Italics - Pole position earned by points standings or practice time. * – Most laps led.)

==== Busch Series ====
NASCAR Busch Series results
Year	Team	No.	Make	1	2	3	4	5	6	7	8	9	10	11	12	13	14	15	16	17	18	19	20	21	22	23	24	25	26	27	28	29	30	31	32	33	34	35	NBSC	Pts	Ref
1983	N/A	N/A	N/A	DAY	RCH	CAR	HCY	MAR	NWS	SBO	GPS	LGY	DOV	BRI	CLT	SBO	HCY	ROU	SBO	ROU	CRW	ROU	SBO	HCY	LGY	IRP	GPS; 23	BRI	HCY	DAR	RCH	NWS	SBO	MAR	ROU; 14	CLT	HCY	MAR	85th	215	
1984	Butner Racing	35	Pontiac	DAY	RCH	CAR	HCY	MAR	DAR	ROU	NSV	LGY	MLW	DOV	CLT	SBO	HCY	ROU	SBO	ROU; 13	HCY	IRP	LGY																61st	242	
1984	Butner Racing	35	Olds																					SBO; 15	BRI	DAR	RCH	NWS	CLT	HCY	CAR	MAR							61st	242	
1985	Butner Racing	35	Olds	DAY	CAR	HCY	BRI	MAR	DAR	SBO	LGY	DOV	CLT	SBO	HCY	ROU	IRP	SBO	LGY	HCY	MLW	BRI	DAR	RCH	NWS; 14	ROU	CLT	HCY	CAR	MAR									71st	121	
1986	Butner Racing	35	Olds	DAY	CAR	HCY	MAR	BRI	DAR	SBO	LGY	JFC	DOV	CLT	SBO	HCY	ROU	IRP	SBO	RAL	OXF	SBO	HCY	LGY	ROU	BRI	DAR	RCH	DOV	MAR	ROU	CLT	CAR	MAR; DNQ					N/A	0	

==== Whelen Modified Tour ====
NASCAR Whelen Modified Tour results
Year	Car owner	No.	Make	1	2	3	4	5	6	7	8	9	10	11	12	13	14	15	16	NWMTC	Pts	Ref
2006	N/A	5	N/A	TMP	STA	JEN	TMP	STA	NHA	HOL	RIV	STA	TMP	MAR; DNQ	TMP	NHA	WFD	TMP	STA	N/A	0	
2007	N/A	5	N/A	TMP	STA	WTO	STA	TMP	NHA	TSA	RIV	STA	TMP	MAN	MAR; DNQ	NHA	TMP	STA	TMP	N/A	0	

==== Whelen Southern Modified Tour ====
NASCAR Whelen Southern Modified Tour results
Year	Car owner	No.	Make	1	2	3	4	5	6	7	8	9	10	11	12	13	14	NWSMTC	Pts	Ref
2005	N/A	5	Chevy	CRW	CRW	CRW	CRW	BGS; 8	MAR; 6	ACE; 11	ACE; 13	CRW	CRW	SNM	ACE			21st	546	
2006	Marty Butner	5	Chevy	CRW	GRE	CRW	DUB	CRW	BGS; 18	MAR; DNQ	CRW	ACE	CRW	HCY	DUB	SNM		35th	224	
2007	Marty Butner	5	Chevy	CRW	FAI	GRE	CRW	CRW	BGS; 20	MAR; DNQ	ACE; 15	CRW	SNM	CRW	CRW			30th	318	
2008	Marty Butner	5	Chevy	CRW	ACE	CRW	BGS; 23	CRW	LAN	CRW	SNM	MAR	CRW	CRW				44th	94	
2009	Marty Butner	5	Chevy	CON	SBO	CRW	LAN	CRW	BGS; 8	BRI	CRW	MBS	CRW	CRW	MAR	ACE	CRW	35th	142	
2010	Marty Butner	5	Chevy	ATL	CRW	SBO	CRW	BGS; 10	BRI	CRW	LGY	TRI	CLT					30th	134	
2011	Marty Butner	5	Chevy	CRW	HCY	SBO	CRW	CRW	BGS; 5	BRI	CRW	LGY	THO	TRI	CRW	CLT	CRW	30th	155	
