= George Brunnhoelzl III =

American racing driver

- Nationality: American
- Born: October 28, 1982 (age 44) North Babylon, New York, U.S.

NASCAR Whelen Southern Modified Tour career
- Debut season: 2006
- Years active: 2006–2016
- Starts: 114
- Championships: 4
- Wins: 28
- Poles: 27
- Best finish: 1st in 2009, 2011, 2012, 2013
- Statistics up to date as of August 12, 2024.

George "Georgie" Brunnhoelzl III (born October 28, 1982) is an American professional stock car racing driver who competed part-time in the NASCAR Whelen Modified Tour. He is the son of George Brunnhoelzl Jr., who competed in the Modified Tour from 1985 to 2001.

Brunnhoelzl is a multi-time champion of the now-defunct NASCAR Whelen Southern Modified Tour, having won the championship in 2009, 2011, 2012, and 2013, where he won 28 races and 27 pole positions.

Brunnhoelzl has previously competed in series such as the SMART Modified Tour, the X-1R Pro Cup Series, the Tri-Track Open Modified Series, the ASA Southern Modified Race Tour, and the World Series of Asphalt Stock Car Racing.

== Motorsports results ==
=== NASCAR ===
(key) (Bold – Pole position awarded by qualifying time. Italics – Pole position earned by points standings or practice time. * – Most laps led.)

==== Whelen Modified Tour ====
NASCAR Whelen Modified Tour results
Year	Car owner	No.	Make	1	2	3	4	5	6	7	8	9	10	11	12	13	14	15	16	17	18	19	NWMTC	Pts	Ref
2002	N/A	2	Dodge	TMP	STA	WFD	NZH	RIV	SEE	RCH; 38	STA	BEE	NHA	RIV	TMP	STA	WFD	TMP	NHA	STA			77th	98	
2002	N/A	02	Chevy																		MAR; 38	TMP	77th	98	
2010	Robert Katon Jr.	46	Chevy	TMP; 16	STA; 29	STA; 9	MAR; 29	NHA; 29	LIM	MND; 6	**RIV**; 5	STA; 10	TMP; 17	BRI; 20	NHA; 13	STA; 13	TMP; 26						17th	1478	
2011	Howard Harvey	09	Chevy	TMP	STA	STA	MND	TMP	NHA	RIV; 27	STA	NHA	BRI	DEL	TMP	LRP	NHA	STA	TMP				53rd	82	
2016	George Brunnhoelzl Jr.	28	Chevy	TMP	STA; 17	WFD	STA	TMP	RIV	NHA	MND	STA	TMP	BRI	RIV	OSW	SEE	NHA	STA	TMP			47th	27	
2017	Heather Brunnhoelzl	28	Chevy	MYR	THO	STA; 20																	50th	50	
2017	Ed Partridge	6	Chevy				LGY; 18	THO	RIV	NHA	STA	THO	BRI	SEE	OSW	RIV	NHA	STA	THO				50th	50	
2019	Eddie Harvey	1	Chevy	MYR	SBO	TMP	STA	WAL	SEE	TMP; 15	RIV; 15	NHA	STA; 16	TMP	OSW	RIV	NHA	STA	TMP				42nd	86	

==== Whelen Southern Modified Tour ====
NASCAR Whelen Southern Modified Tour results
Year	Car owner	No.	Make	1	2	3	4	5	6	7	8	9	10	11	12	13	14	NSWMTC	Pts	Ref
2006	George Brunnhoelzl Jr.	2	Chevy	CRW	GRE	CRW	DUB	CRW	BGS	MAR	CRW	ACE	CRW	HCY	DUB; 20	SNM; 11		33rd	233	
2007	George Brunnhoelzl Jr.	2	Dodge	CRW; 9		GRE; 12	CRW; 9	CRW; 14	BGS; 6	MAR; 5	ACE; 8	CRW; 12	SNM; 8	CRW; 20	CRW; 8			8th	1609	
2007	George Brunnhoelzl Jr.	2	Chevy		FAI; 13													8th	1609	
2008	George Brunnhoelzl	28	Ford	CRW; 26	ACE; 15	CRW; 4	BGS; 25	CRW; 6	LAN; 1*	CRW; 13	SNM; 5	MAR; 4	CRW; 3	CRW; 5				7th	1540	
2009	George Brunnhoelzl	28	Ford	CON; 3	**SBO**; 2	**CRW**; 11*	**LAN**; 2	CRW; 1	BGS; 2	BRI; 1	**CRW**; 2	**MBS**; 2	CRW; 1*	CRW; 2	MAR; 2	ACE; 1*	**CRW**; 1*	1st	2385	
2010	George Brunnhoelzl Jr.	28	Ford	ATL	CRW	SBO; 15	CRW	BGS	BRI	CRW; 5	LGY	TRI; 17	CLT					23rd	385	
2011	Howard Harvey	09	Chevy	CRW; 1	HCY; 1	SBO; 2	**CRW**; 4	CRW; 2	**BGS**; 3	BRI; 10	CRW; 2	LGY; 7	THO; 1	**TRI**; 1*	**CRW**; 2	**CLT**; 2*	CRW; 1*	1st	2415	
2012	Howard Harvey	09	Chevy	**CRW**; 1*	CRW; 7	SBO; 8*	**CRW**; 1*	**CRW**; 1**	BGS; 1*	BRI; 1	LGY; 10	THO; 8	**CRW**; 10	**CLT**; 1**				1st	468	
2013	George Brunnhoelzl Jr.	28	Chevy	CRW; 2	SNM; 4	**SBO**; 1**	**CRW**; 1	CRW; 1**	BGS; 14	BRI; 4	LGY; 2	CRW; 2	CRW; 2	SNM; 2	CLT; 3			1st	506	
2014	George Brunnhoelzl Jr.	28	Chevy	CRW; 2	**SNM**; 3	SBO; 2	LGY; 1*	CRW; 2	BGS; 16	BRI; 2	LGY; 2	**CRW**; 12*	SBO; 3	SNM; 2	CRW; 1*	CRW; 13	CLT; 7	2nd	569	
2015	George Brunnhoelzl Jr.	28	Chevy	CRW; 16*	CRW; 11	SBO; 18	**LGY**; 3	CRW; 1	BGS; 15*	BRI; 3	**LGY**; 1*	SBO; 2	**CLT**; 1*					2nd	390	
2016	George Brunnhoelzl Jr.	28	Chevy	CRW; 7	CON; 1	SBO; 1*	CRW; 5	CRW; 3	BGS; 14		ECA; 6	SBO; 3	CRW; 1	**CLT**; 2*				2nd	445	
2016	George Brunnhoelzl Jr.	28S	Chevy							BRI; 12								2nd	445	
