= Tim Brown (racing driver) =

American racing driver

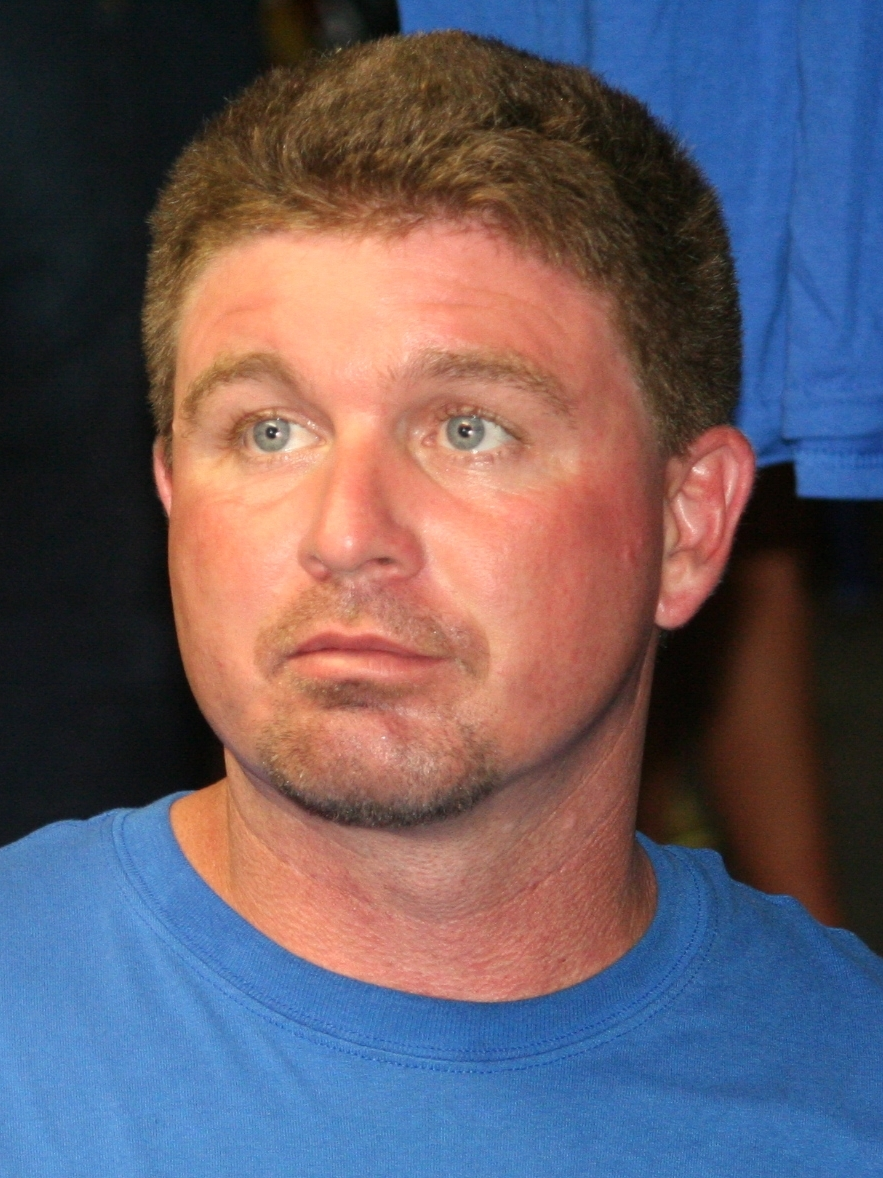
- Brown at Bowman Gray Stadium in 2011
- Born: Timothy Harold Brown; July 6, 1971 (age 55); Cana, Virginia, U.S.

NASCAR FedEx Freight Truck Series career
- 1 race run over 1 year
- 2009 position: 97th
- Best finish: 97th (2009)
- First race: 2009 Kroger 200 (Martinsville)
Wins	Top tens	Poles
0	0	0
- Statistics up to date as of August 15, 2024.

Timothy Harold Brown (born July 6, 1971) is an American professional stock car racing driver who competed in the NASCAR Camping World Truck Series and the now defunct NASCAR Whelen Southern Modified Tour.

Brown is a long-time competitor at Bowman Gray Stadium, having won 101 races in the modified division, which is the most of all time as of 2024.

Brown has previously competed in series such as the SMART Modified Tour, the Southern Modified Racing Series, and the Southern Modified Race Tour.

Brown competed in the 2025 Clash at Bowman Gray Stadium, driving the No. 15 Ford for Rick Ware Racing. He previously worked with the team as a suspension and drivetrain specialist.

== Motorsports results ==
=== NASCAR ===
(key) (Bold – Pole position awarded by qualifying time. Italics – Pole position earned by points standings or practice time. * – Most laps led.)

==== Camping World Truck Series ====
NASCAR Camping World Truck Series results
Year	Team	No.	Make	1	2	3	4	5	6	7	8	9	10	11	12	13	14	15	16	17	18	19	20	21	22	23	24	25	NCWTC	Pts	Ref
2009	SS-Green Light Racing	08	Chevy	DAY	CAL	ATL	MAR	KAN	CLT	DOV	TEX	MCH	MLW	MEM	KEN	IRP	NSH	BRI	CHI	IOW	GTW	NHA	LVS	MAR; 27	TAL	TEX	PHO	HOM	97th	82	

==== Whelen Southern Modified Tour ====
NASCAR Whelen Southern Modified Tour results
Year	Car owner	No.	Make	1	2	3	4	5	6	7	8	9	10	11	12	13	14	NSWMTC	Pts	Ref
2005	Ben Brown	83	Chevy	CRW; DNQ	CRW; 12	CRW; 5	CRW; 5	BGS; 2	MAR; 4	ACE; 8	ACE; 8	CRW; 2	CRW; 12	DUB; 3	ACE; 11			4th	1752	
2006	Ben Brown	83	Chevy	CRW; 8	GRE; 2	CRW; 3	DUB; 9	CRW; 8	BGS; 5	MAR; 1	**CRW**; 2*	**ACE**; 2	**CRW**; 3	HCY; 2	DUB; 5	SNM; 2		2nd	2092	
2007	Ben Brown	83	Chevy	CRW; 8	FAI; 6	GRE; 3	CRW; 15	CRW; 6	**BGS**; 4	MAR; 2	**ACE**; 1*	CRW; 5	SNM; 1*	CRW; 3	CRW; 2			2nd	1905	
2008	Ben Brown	83	Chevy	CRW; 4	ACE; 7	CRW; 17	BGS; 3	CRW; 8	LAN; 5	CRW; 1	SNM; 2	MAR; 2	**CRW**; 1	**CRW**; 2				2nd	1750	
2009	Ben Brown	83	Chevy	CON; 17	SBO; 4	CRW; 9	LAN; 11	CRW	BGS	BRI	CRW	MBS	CRW	CRW	MAR	ACE	CRW	18th	540	
2010	Ben Brown	83	Chevy	ATL; 2*	CRW; 7	SBO; 6	CRW											11th	1209	
2010	Tommy Lythgoe	02	Chevy					BGS; 15	BRI; 10	CRW; 14	LGY; 1	TRI	CLT; 2					11th	1209	
2011	Tommy Lythgoe	02	Chevy	CRW; 2	HCY; 16	SBO; 4	CRW; 8	CRW; DNQ	BGS; 9	BRI; 8	CRW; 12	LGY; 6	THO; 3	TRI; 6	CRW; 3	CLT; 1	CRW; 7	4th	2067	
2012	Tommy Lythgoe	02	Chevy	CRW; 13	**CRW**; 4	SBO; 11	CRW; 14	CRW; 9	BGS; 2	BRI; 15	LGY; 5	THO; 5	CRW; 5	CLT; 11				4th	393	
2013	Tommy Lythgoe	02	Chevy	**CRW**; 14		SBO; 5	CRW; 2*	CRW; 17	BGS; 5	BRI; 6	LGY; 3	CRW; 4	CRW; 14	SNM; 14	CLT; 4			5th	438	
2013	Tommy Lythgoe	02	Ford		SNM; 3													5th	438	
