= Lee Jeffreys =

American racing driver

- Nationality: American
- Born: December 2, 1966 (age 59) Wallburg, North Carolina, U.S.
- Relatives: Robert Jeffreys (father)

NASCAR Whelen Southern Modified Tour career
- Debut season: 2005
- Years active: 2005–2006, 2009–2011
- Teams: J & R Racing
- Car number: 75
- Starts: 18
- Championships: 0
- Wins: 0
- Poles: 0
- Best finish: 18th in 2005
- Statistics up to date as of October 24, 2024.

Lee Jeffreys (born December 2, 1966) is an American professional stock car racing driver who competed in the now defunct NASCAR Whelen Southern Modified Tour from 2005 to 2011. He is the son of the late Robert Jeffreys, who also competed in modified racing.

Jeffreys has previously competed in series such as the SMART Modified Tour, the 602 Modified Tour, and the Carolina Crate Modified Series. He is also a frequent competitor at Bowman Gray Stadium.

== Motorsports results ==
=== NASCAR ===
(key) (Bold – Pole position awarded by qualifying time. Italics – Pole position earned by points standings or practice time. * – Most laps led.)

==== Whelen Southern Modified Tour ====
NASCAR Whelen Southern Modified Tour results
Year	Car owner	No.	Make	1	2	3	4	5	6	7	8	9	10	11	12	13	14	NWSMTC	Pts	Ref
2005	N/A	11	Dodge	CRW	CRW	CRW	CRW	BGS; 20	MAR	ACE; 12	ACE; 10	CRW	CRW	DUB; 13	ACE; 17			18th	600	
2006	N/A	01	Dodge	CRW; 27														19th	724	
2006	Melvin Swisher	53	Dodge		GRE; 20		DUB; 15											19th	724	
2006	N/A	0	Dodge			CRW; 26												19th	724	
2006	N/A	3	Dodge					CRW; 15										19th	724	
2006	Robert Jeffreys	75	Chevy						BGS; 19*	MAR	CRW	ACE	CRW					19th	724	
2006	N/A	01	Chevy											HCY; 17	DUB	SNM		19th	724	
2009	Julie Pack	81	Chevy	CON	SBO	CRW	LAN	CRW	BGS	BRI	CRW	MBS	CRW	CRW; 16	MAR	ACE	CRW; 11	33rd	245	
2010	Julie Pack	81	Chevy	ATL; 13	CRW; 10	SBO	CRW	BGS	BRI	CRW	LGY	TRI	CLT					27th	258	
2011	Philip Smith	1	Ford	CRW	HCY	SBO; 8	CRW; 9	CRW	BGS	BRI	CRW	LGY	THO	TRI	CRW	CLT	CRW	27th	285	
