= 2010 NASCAR Whelen Southern Modified Tour =

The 2010 NASCAR Whelen Southern Modified Tour was the sixth season of the NASCAR Whelen Southern Modified Tour (WSMT). It began with the Atlanta 150 at Atlanta Motor Speedway on March 5. It ended with the UNOH Southern Slam 150 at Charlotte Motor Speedway on October 14. George Brunnhoelzl III entered the season as the defending championship. Burt Myers would win his first championship in the series, 31 points ahead of series runner up L. W. Miller.

== Schedule ==
No.	Race Title	Track	Date
1	Atlanta 150	Atlanta Motor Speedway, Hampton, Georgia	March 5
2	Spring Classic 150	Caraway Speedway, Asheboro, North Carolina	March 14
3	South Boston 150	South Boston Speedway, South Boston, Virginia	April 3
4	Firecracker 150	Caraway Speedway, Asheboro, North Carolina	July 2
5	Strutmasters.com 199	Bowman Gray Stadium, Winston-Salem, North Carolina	August 7
6	UNOH Perfect Storm (Note: The UNOH Perfect Storm was held as a combined event, with competitors from the Whelen Southern Modified Tour competing along with competitors for the Whelen Modified Tour. The race was run with a series-based point distribution, where drivers received points and statistical credit for their finish relative to other drivers in their series, not to the whole field in general.)	Bristol Motor Speedway, Bristol, Tennessee	August 18
7	Triad Commercial Property Services 150	Caraway Speedway, Asheboro, North Carolina	August 28
8	Visit Hampton 150	Langley Speedway, Hampton, Virginia	September 4
9	Tri-County 150	Tri-County Motor Speedway, Hudson, North Carolina	September 25
10	UNOH Southern Slam 150	Charlotte Motor Speedway, Concord, North Carolina	October 14

== Results and standings ==
=== Races ===
No.	Race	Pole position	Most laps led	Winning driver	Manufacturer
1	Atlanta 150	James Civali	Tim Brown	Corey LaJoie	Pontiac
2	Spring Classic 150	Burt Myers	Andy Seuss	Andy Seuss	Dodge
3	South Boston 150	Zach Brewer	James Civali	James Civali	Pontiac
4	Firecracker 150	Burt Myers	L. W. Miller	John Smith	Chevrolet
5	Strutmasters.com 199	Zach Brewer	Burt Myers	L. W. Miller	Pontiac
6	UNOH Perfect Storm	Justin Bonsignore	Ted Christopher	Ryan Newman	Chevrolet
7	Triad Commercial Property Services 150	Andy Seuss	Andy Seuss	Andy Seuss	Dodge
8	Visit Hampton 150	James Civali	James Civali	Tim Brown	Chevrolet
9	Tri-County 150	George Brunnhoelzl III	Jason Myers	Burt Myers	Ford
10	UNOH Southern Slam 150	Andy Seuss	Burt Myers	Burt Myers	Ford

=== Drivers' championship ===
(key) Bold - Pole position awarded by time. Italics - Pole position set by final practice results or rainout. * – Most laps led.

Pos	Driver	ATL	CRW	SBO	CRW	BGS	BRI	CRW	LGY	TRI	CLT	Points
1	Burt Myers	17	**6**	8	**5**	2*	11	4	3	1	1*	1609
2	L. W. Miller	14	2	2	2*	1	29	2	8	8	6	1578
3	James Civali	**6**	3	1*	3	13	3	7	**2***	5	16	1575
4	Andy Seuss	12	1**	3	6	5	23	**1****	5	3	**18**	1566
5	John Smith	9	8	7	1	3	19	3	13	2	4	1555
6	Zach Brewer	8	5	**5**	19	**7**	32	9	4	12	3	1429
7	Jason Myers	7	18	12	4	4	18	8	6	7*	17	1427
8	Frank Fleming	3	12	11	21	6	17	11	9	18	7	1365
9	Brandon Hire	5	11	25	11	8	36	6	10	4	11	1354
10	Gene Pack	21	9	20	8	11	25	12	7	9	12	1293
11	Tim Brown	2*	7	6		15	30	14	1		2	1209
12	Bryan Dauzat	20	14	21	15	17	24	16	11	10	15	1197
13	Greg Butcher	23	16	17	14	18	34	19	14	15		1023
14	Mike Norman	18	19	19	18	16		20		16	14	884
15	Brian Loftin	16	4	10	16			17		6		791
16	Bradley Robbins	22	15	16	13	14					13	699
17	Jonathan Kievman	15		22	20			10		19	9	696
18	Gary Putnam	19	13	18	10			18			19	688
19	Josh Nichols			14	7	9		13				529
20	Buddy Emory	10	17	24	17							452
21	Johnny Sutton				9					11	8	410
22	Darrel Krentz			23					12	13		345
23	George Brunnhoelzl III			15			28^{1}	5		**17**		385
24	Thomas Stinson			4							10	294
25	Dave Brigati	4		13								284
26	Daniel Hemric							15			5	273
27	Lee Jeffreys	13	10									258
28	Corey LaJoie	1										185
29	Brian King			9								138
30	Randy Butner					10						134
31	Adam Gay	11										130
32	Austin Pack				12							127
33	Luke Fleming					12						127
34	Donnie Lacks									14		121
35	Shawn Balluzzo								15			118
	Gary Fountain Sr.						DNQ					
Drivers ineligible for NWSMT points, because at the combined event at Bristol they chose to drive for NWMT points
	Ryan Newman						1					
	Mike Stefanik						2					
	Bobby Santos III						4					
	Todd Szegedy						5					
	Justin Bonsignore						**6**					
	Dale Quarterley						7					
	Eric Goodale						8					
	Ryan Preece						9					
	Erick Rudolph						10					
	Chuck Hossfeld						12					
	Woody Pitkat						13					
	Eric Beers						14					
	Ron Silk						15					
	Kevin Goodale						16					
	Ed Flemke Jr.						20					
	Jamie Tomaino						21					
	Wade Cole						22					
	Ted Christopher						26*					
	Rob Summers						27					
	Richie Pallai Jr.						31					
	Rowan Pennink						33					
	Renee Dupuis						35					
	Andy Petree						DNQ					
Pos	Driver	ATL	CRW	SBO	CRW	BGS	BRI	CRW	LGY	TRI	CLT	Points

- ^{1} – Scored points towards the Whelen Modified Tour.

== See also ==
- 2010 NASCAR Sprint Cup Series
- 2010 NASCAR Nationwide Series
- 2010 NASCAR Camping World Truck Series
- 2010 ARCA Racing Series
- 2010 NASCAR Whelen Modified Tour
- 2010 NASCAR Canadian Tire Series
- 2010 NASCAR Mini Stock Series
- 2010 NASCAR Corona Series
