= John Smith (racing driver, born 1975) =

American racing driver

- Nationality: American
- Born: June 25, 1975 (age 51) Mount Airy, North Carolina, U.S.

NASCAR Whelen Southern Modified Tour career
- Debut season: 2005
- Years active: 2005–2013, 2015
- Starts: 93
- Championships: 0
- Wins: 1
- Poles: 0
- Best finish: 5th in 2010, 2011
- Statistics up to date as of August 21, 2024.

John Smith (born June 25, 1975) is an American professional stock car racing driver who competed in the now defunct NASCAR Whelen Southern Modified Tour from 2005 to 2015.

Smith has previously competed in series such as the SMART Modified Tour, the ASA Southern Modified Race Tour, the Southern Modified Racing Series, and the World Series of Asphalt Stock Car Racing.

== Motorsports results ==
=== NASCAR ===
(key) (Bold – Pole position awarded by qualifying time. Italics – Pole position earned by points standings or practice time. * – Most laps led.)

==== Whelen Southern Modified Tour ====
NASCAR Whelen Southern Modified Tour results
Year	Car owner	No.	Make	1	2	3	4	5	6	7	8	9	10	11	12	13	14	NWSMTC	Pts	Ref
2005	Gary Tutterow	25	Chevy	CRW; 7	CRW; 7	CRW; 20	CRW	BGS; 14	MAR	ACE	ACE	CRW	CRW	DUB; 10	ACE; 4			15th	810	
2006	Gary Tutterow	25	Chevy	CRW; 16	GRE	CRW; 7	DUB; 8	CRW	BGS; 14	MAR	CRW	ACE	CRW	HCY	DUB	SNM		24th	524	
2007	Gary Tutterow	25	Chevy	CRW; 7	FAI	GRE; 10	CRW	CRW	BGS; 2	MAR	ACE; 7	CRW	SNM	CRW; 6	CRW; 16			16th	861	
2008	Gary Tutterow	25	Chevy	CRW; 19	ACE; 19	CRW; 14	BGS; 7	CRW; 9	LAN; 12	CRW; 15	SNM; 9	MAR; 9	CRW; 15	CRW; 8				8th	1398	
2009	Gary Tutterow	25	Chevy	CON; 9	SBO; 10	CRW; 12	LAN; 13	CRW; 17	BGS; 13*	BRI; 8	CRW; 5	MBS; 7	CRW; 5	CRW; 7	MAR; 6	ACE	CRW; 2	7th	1823	
2010	Gary Tutterow	25	Chevy	ATL; 9	CRW; 8	SBO; 7	CRW; 1	BGS; 3	BRI; 5	CRW; 3	LGY; 13	TRI; 2	CLT; 4					5th	1555	
2011	Gary Tutterow	25	Chevy	CRW; 6	HCY; 4	SBO; 5	CRW; 3	CRW; 4	BGS; 13	BRI; 5	CRW; 5	LGY; 2	THO; 13	TRI; 12	CRW; 11	CLT; 8	CRW; 14	5th	2043	
2012	Grady Jeffreys	25	Chevy	CRW; 5	CRW; 17	SBO; 10	CRW; 19	CRW; 7	BGS; 16	BRI; 14	LGY; 4	THO; 9	CRW; 9	CLT; 17				9th	357	
2013	Grady Jeffreys	25	Chevy	CRW; 9	SNM; 16	SBO; 4	CRW; 12	CRW; 16	BGS; 6	BRI; 5	LGY; 4	CRW; 3	CRW; 3	SNM; 8	CLT; 7			6th	435	
2015	Grady Tutterow	25	Chevy	CRW; 3	CRW; 10	SBO; 17	LGY; 12	CRW	BGS; 17	BRI	LGY	SBO	CLT; 8					14th	197	

=== SMART Modified Tour ===
SMART Modified Tour results
Year	Car owner	No.	Make	1	2	3	4	5	6	7	8	9	10	11	12	13	SMTC	Pts	Ref
2000	N/A	19	N/A	CRW	JAC; 8	AND	CRW; 13	MYB; 12	CRW; 22	ACE	CRW; 17	PUL; 15	CRW; 7	CRW; 6			16th	1101	
2001	N/A	19	N/A	CRW; 5	CRW; 8	AND; 18	LAN; 15	CRW; 10	MYB; 7	ACE; 8	CRW; 11	PUL; 26	CRW; 20	CRW; 6	CRW; 21	SBS; 15	8th	1714	
2002	N/A	19	N/A	SUM; 9	CRW; 5	LAN; 5	CRW; 9	ACE; 25	CRW; 24	PUL; 5	CRW; 26	CON; 6	CRW; 22				11th	1337	
2003	N/A	19	N/A	CRW; 12	SUM; 1	CRW; 19	UMP; 5	UMP; 17	CRW; 6	MYB; 8	ACE; 17	CRW; 9	UMP; 12	CON; 21	UMP; 14		11th	1655	
2004	Gary Tutterow	25	Chevy	CRW; 14	UMP; 3	CRW; 3	CRW; 16	UMP; 6	UMP; 5	CRW; 6	MYB; 4	CRW; 8	CRW; 3	PUL; 7	CON; 9	UMP; 4	4th	1932	
2021	N/A	24	N/A	CRW; 3	FLO; 6	SBO; 10	FCS; 1										2nd	282	
2021	N/A	17	N/A					CRW; 16									2nd	282	
2021	N/A	19	N/A						DIL; 4	CAR; 7	CRW; 8	DOM; 6	PUL; 9	HCY; 10	ACE		2nd	282	
2022	N/A	07	LFR	FLO	SNM	CRW	SBO	FCS	CRW	NWS	NWS	CAR	DOM	HCY; 11	TRI; 8	PUL	30th	43	
2023	N/A	07	LFR	FLO	CRW	SBO	HCY; 6	FCS; 21	CRW; 11	ACE	CAR	PUL	TRI	SBO	ROU		33rd	85	
2026	John Smith	71	N/A	FLO	AND; 22	SBO	DOM	HCY	WKS	FCR	CRW	PUL	CAR	ROU	TRI	NWS	67th	19	
