= Zach Brewer =

American racing driver (1979–2024)

- Nationality: American
- Born: Zachary Kyle Brewer; November 29, 1979 Arcadia, North Carolina, U.S.
- Died: March 3, 2024 (aged 44)

NASCAR Whelen Southern Modified Tour career
- Debut season: 2007
- Years active: 2007–2011, 2014
- Starts: 32
- Championships: 0
- Wins: 0
- Poles: 2
- Best finish: 6th in 2010
- Statistics up to date as of October 24, 2024.

Zachary Kyle Brewer (born November 29, 1979 – March 3, 2024) was an American professional stock car racing driver who competed in the now defunct NASCAR Whelen Southern Modified Tour from 2007 to 2014.

Brewer died on March 3, 2024, following a brief illness.

Brewer previously competed in series such as the NASCAR Whelen Modified Tour, the SMART Modified Tour, and the NASCAR Goody's Dash Series.

== Motorsports results ==
=== NASCAR ===
(key) (Bold – Pole position awarded by qualifying time. Italics – Pole position earned by points standings or practice time. * – Most laps led.)

==== Goody's Dash Series ====
NASCAR Goody's Dash Series results
Year	Team	No.	Make	1	2	3	4	5	6	7	8	9	10	11	12	13	14	15	16	17	18	NGDS	Pts	Ref
1999	N/A	31	Pontiac	DAY; 25	HCY; 14	CAR; 17	CLT; 13	BRI; 1	LOU; 15	SUM; 4		ROU; 6	STA; 2	MYB; 9	HCY; 27	LAN; 2	USA; 7	JAC; 4	LAN; 8			6th	2142	
1999	N/A	11	Pontiac								GRE; 26											6th	2142	
2000	N/A	31	Pontiac	DAY; 32	MON; 7	STA; 21	JAC; 11	CAR; 15	CLT; 13	SBO; 12	ROU; 23	LOU	SUM	GRE	SNM	MYB; 10	BRI; 14	HCY; 27	JAC	USA; 12	LAN	22nd	1370	
2001	N/A	31	Pontiac	DAY; 34	ROU	DAR; 25	CLT; 7	LOU	JAC	KEN; 6	SBO	DAY; 4	GRE; 26	SNM	NRV; 6	MYB	BRI; 6	ACE; 5	JAC	USA; 8	NSH	17th	1287	
2002	N/A	31	Pontiac	DAY; 29	HAR; 6	ROU; 4	LON; 1*	CLT; 6	KEN; 7	MEM; 7	GRE; 7	SNM; 8	SBO; 10	MYB; 4	BRI; 4	MOT; 7	ATL; 1					4th	2076	
2003	N/A	31	Pontiac	DAY; 6	OGL; 16	CLT; 35	SBO; 8	GRE	KEN	BRI; 8	ATL											20th	607	

==== Whelen Modified Tour ====
NASCAR Whelen Modified Tour results
Year	Car owner	No.	Make	1	2	3	4	5	6	7	8	9	10	11	12	13	14	NWMTC	Pts	Ref
2010	Eddie Harvey	11	Chevy	TMP	STA	STA	MAR; 37	NHA	LIM	MND	RIV	STA	TMP	BRI	NHA	STA	TMP	59th	52	

==== Whelen Southern Modified Tour ====
NASCAR Whelen Southern Modified Tour results
Year	Car owner	No.	Make	1	2	3	4	5	6	7	8	9	10	11	12	13	14	NWSMTC	Pts	Ref
2007	Doug Brewer	18	Chevy	CRW	FAI	GRE	CRW	CRW; 9		MAR; 14	ACE	CRW	SNM	CRW; 11	CRW			24th	531	
2007	Doug Brewer	18	Ford						BGS; 8									24th	531	
2008	Doug Brewer	18	Chevy	CRW; 18	ACE	CRW		CRW; 10	LAN	CRW; 11	SNM	MAR; 12						18th	877	
2008	Doug Brewer	18	Pontiac				BGS; 6						CRW; 18	CRW; 15				18th	877	
2009	Doug Brewer	18	Chevy	CON	SBO; 16	CRW; 21	LAN	CRW; 6	BGS; 19	BRI	CRW	MBS	CRW	CRW	MAR; 15	ACE	CRW; 7	15th	735	
2010	Eddie Harvey	11	Chevy	ATL; 8	CRW; 5	**SBO**; 5	CRW; 19	**BGS**; 7	BRI; 11	CRW; 9	LGY; 4	TRI; 12	CLT; 3					6th	1429	
2011	Eddie Harvey	11	Chevy	CRW; 17	HCY; 2	SBO; 3*	CRW; 15	CRW	BGS	BRI	CRW	LGY	THO	TRI	CRW	CLT	CRW	16th	580	
2014	Eddie Harvey	09	Chevy	CRW	SNM	SBO	LGY	CRW	BGS	BRI	LGY	CRW	SBO	SNM	CRW	CRW	CLT; 6	25th	38	

=== SMART Modified Tour ===
SMART Modified Tour results
Year	Car owner	No.	Make	1	2	3	4	5	6	7	8	9	10	11	12	13	SMTC	Pts	Ref
2001	N/A	N/A	N/A	CRW	CRW	AND	LAN	CRW	MYB	ACE	CRW	PUL	CRW; 15	CRW; 21	CRW	SBS	39th	218	
2021	Zach Brewer	31	N/A	CRW	FLO	SBO; 6	FCS	CRW	DIL	CAR	CRW	DOM	PUL	HCY; 16	ACE		27th	40	
2022	Hill Enterprises	79	Troyer	FLO	SNM	CRW	SBO	FCS	CRW	NWS	NWS	CAR	DOM	HCY; 22	TRI; 17	PUL	41st	22	
2023	Hill Enterprises	79	Troyer	FLO; 12	CRW; 5	SBO; 27	HCY	FCS	CRW; 24	ACE; 8	CAR; 19	PUL	TRI	SBO	ROU		22nd	147	
