= Eric Berndt =

American racing driver

- Nationality: American
- Born: April 23, 1979 (age 47) Rocky Hill, Connecticut, U.S.

NASCAR Whelen Modified Tour career
- Debut season: 2004
- Current team: Ferguson Racing
- Years active: 2001, 2003–2013, 2023, 2025–present
- Car number: 11
- Starts: 90
- Championships: 0
- Wins: 0
- Poles: 2
- Best finish: 13th in 2012
- Finished last season: 50th (2026)
- Statistics up to date as of October 12, 2026.

Eric Berndt (born April 23, 1979) is an American professional stock car racing driver who competes part-time in the NASCAR Whelen Modified Tour, driving the No. 11 for Ferguson Motorsports. Nicknamed "The Bulldog", Berndt has spent the majority of his career driving SK Modifieds at Stafford Motor Speedway, Thompson Speedway Motorsports Park, and the Waterford Speedbowl, winning races at all three facilities as well as the 2003 track championship at Thompson. Berndt's grandfather Ron has owned racecars in Connecticut dating back to the 1960's.

Berndt has also competed in the Tri-Track Open Modified Series and the Modified Racing Series.

== Motorsports results ==
=== NASCAR ===
(key) (Bold – Pole position awarded by qualifying time. Italics – Pole position earned by points standings or practice time. * – Most laps led.)

==== Whelen Modified Tour ====
NASCAR Whelen Modified Tour results
Year	Car owner	No.	Make	1	2	3	4	5	6	7	8	9	10	11	12	13	14	15	16	17	18	19	20	NWMTC	Pts	Ref
2001	N/A	13	N/A	SBO	TMP	STA	WFD	NZH	STA	RIV	SEE	RCH	NHA	HOL	RIV	CHE	TMP	STA	WFD	TMP	STA; DNQ	MAR	TMP; DNQ	N/A	0	
2003	N/A	25	N/A	TMP; DNQ	STA	WFD	NZH	STA	LER	BLL	BEE	NHA	ADI	RIV	TMP	STA	WFD	TMP	NHA	STA	TMP			N/A	0	
2004	Ronald Berndt	64	Chevy	TMP	STA	WFD	NZH	STA	RIV	LER	WAL	BEE	NHA	SEE	RIV	STA	TMP	WFD	TMP; 31	NHA	STA; DNQ	TMP; 16		63rd	225	
2005	Ronald Berndt	64	Chevy	TMP; 32	STA; 32	RIV	WFD; 21	STA; 20	JEN	NHA	BEE	SEE; 12	RIV	STA; DNQ	TMP	WFD	MAR	TMP	NHA	STA	TMP			39th	528	
2006	Ronald Berndt	64	Chevy	TMP; 30	STA; DNQ	JEN	TMP; DNQ	STA	NHA	HOL	RIV	STA; DNQ	TMP; DNQ	MAR	TMP; 26	NHA	WFD; 8	TMP; DNQ	STA; 29					37th	576	
2007	Ronald Berndt	64	Chevy	TMP; 37	STA	WTO	STA; 14	TMP; 29	NHA	TSA	RIV													35th	734	
2007	Ronald Berndt	64	Pontiac										STA; 14	TMP; 11	MAN	MAR	NHA	TMP; 28	STA; 23	TMP; DNQ				35th	734	
2008	Ronald Berndt	64	Chevy	TMP; 31	STA; 18	STA; 26	TMP; 32	NHA	SPE	RIV	STA; 29	TMP; 31	MAN	TMP; 31	NHA	MAR	CHE	STA; 31	TMP					37th	617	
2009	Ronald Berndt	64	Chevy	TMP; 24																				31st	667	
2009	Ronald Berndt	54	Chevy		STA; 13	STA; 20	NHA	SPE	RIV	STA; 16	BRI	TMP; 7	NHA	MAR	**STA**; 25	TMP								31st	667	
2010	Ronald Berndt	54	Chevy	TMP; 11	STA; 7	STA; 6*	MAR	NHA	LIM	MND; 4	RIV	STA; 27	TMP; 29	BRI	NHA	STA; 21	TMP; 12							28th	986	
2011	Robert Katon Jr.	46	Chevy	TMP; 28	STA; 20	STA; 12	MND; 16	TMP; 5	NHA; 13	RIV; 16	STA; 23	NHA; 27	BRI; 9	DEL; 6	TMP; 24	LRP; 13	NHA; 23	STA; 26	TMP; 27					17th	1763	
2012	Robert Katon Jr.	46	Chevy	TMP; 24	STA; 15	MND; 21	STA; 15	WFD; 12	NHA; 15	STA; 20	TMP; 19	BRI; 12	TMP; 9	RIV; 10	NHA; 11	STA; 21	**TMP**; 15							13th	399	
2013	Robert Katon Jr.	46	Chevy	TMP; 29	STA; 14	STA; 16	WFD; 14	RIV; 16	NHA; 7	MND; 10	STA; 18	TMP; 14	BRI; 16	RIV; 27	NHA; 26	STA; 20	TMP							19th	345	
2023	Rob Fuller	1	Chevy	NSM	RCH	MON	RIV	LEE	SEE	RIV	WAL	NHA	LMP	THO; 21	LGY	OSW	MON	RIV	NWS	THO; 23				51st	57	
2023	Tim Lepine	79	Chevy																		MAR; 32			51st	57	
2025	Ferguson Racing	11	Chevy	NSM	THO; 21	NWS	SEE	RIV	WMM	LMP	MON	MON	THO; 27	RCH	OSW	NHA	RIV	THO; 16	MAR					45th	68	
2026	Ferguson Racing	11	Chevy	NSM	MAR	THO; 14	SEE	RIV	OXF	SEE	CLM	WMM	MON	THO	NHA	STA	OSW	RIV	THO					50th	30	
