= James Civali =

American racing driver

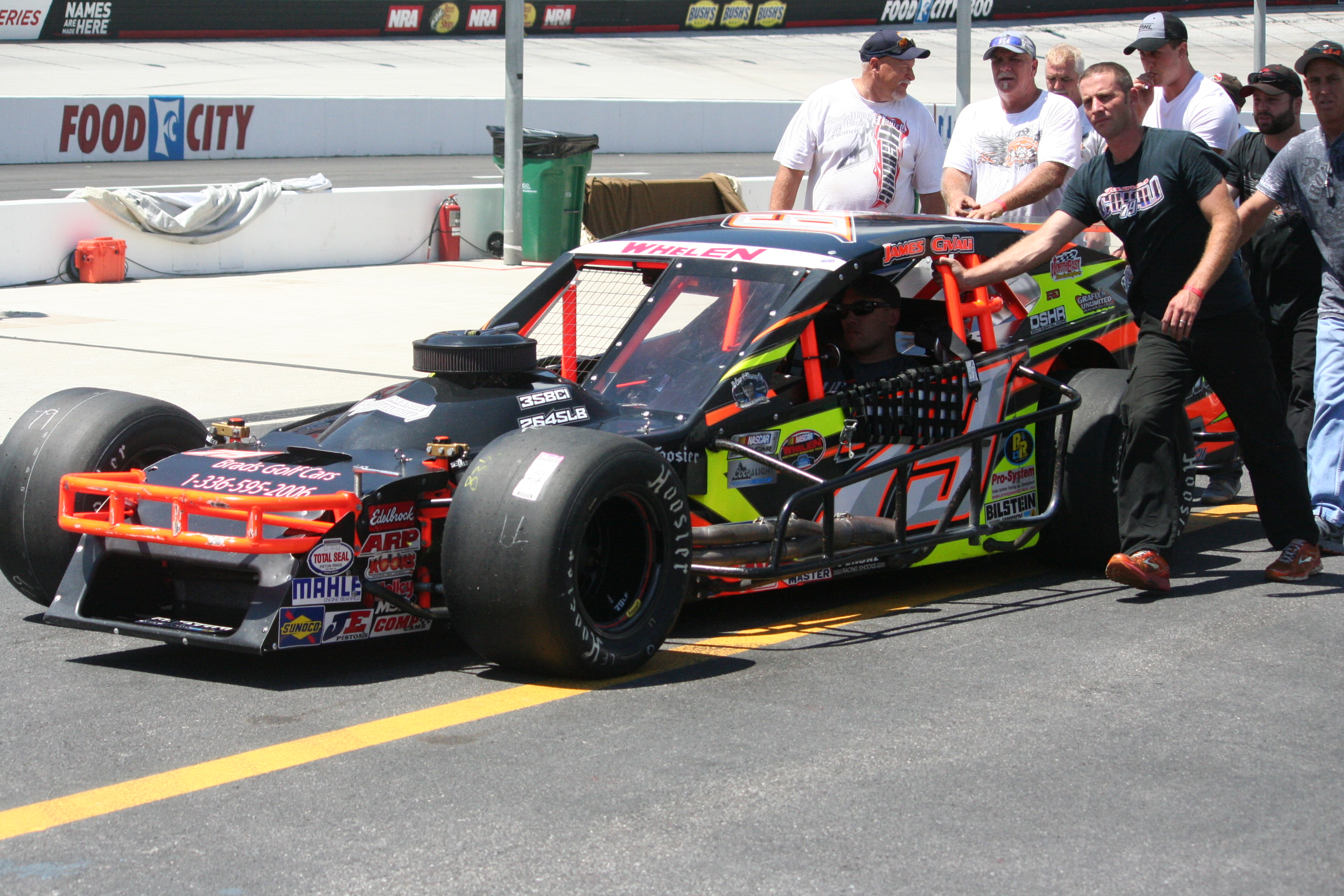
- Civali's No. 79 car at Bristol Motor Speedway in 2016
- Nationality: American
- Born: October 9, 1983 (age 43) Meriden, Connecticut, U.S.

NASCAR Whelen Modified Tour career
- Debut season: 2005
- Years active: 2005–2011, 2014–2015, 2019
- Starts: 79
- Championships: 0
- Wins: 4
- Poles: 1
- Best finish: 6th in 2006
- Finished last season: 65th (2019)
- Statistics up to date as of July 24, 2024.

James W. Civali (born October 9, 1983) is an American professional stock car racing driver who last competed part-time in the NASCAR Whelen Modified Tour.

Civali is a long-time competitor of the series, having made his debut in 2005, and has since won four races and one pole position.

Civali has also competed in what is now known as the ARCA Menards Series East and the now defunct NASCAR Whelen Southern Modified Tour, as well as the SMART Modified Tour, the Southern Modified Racing Series, the Modified Racing Series, the Carolina Crate Modified Series, and the World Series of Asphalt Stock Car Racing.

== Motorsports results ==
=== NASCAR ===
(key) (Bold – Pole position awarded by qualifying time. Italics – Pole position earned by points standings or practice time. * – Most laps led.)

==== Busch East Series ====
NASCAR Busch East Series results
Year	Team	No.	Make	1	2	3	4	5	6	7	8	9	10	11	12	13	NBESC	Pts	Ref
2005	Joseph Civali	7	Chevy	STA; 26	HOL	ERI	NHA; 10	WFD	ADI	STA; 21	DUB	OXF	NHA	DOV	LRP	TMP	35th	319	
2006	Joseph Civali	7	Chevy	GRE	STA	HOL	TMP; 27	ERI	NHA	ADI	WFD	NHA; 15	DOV	LRP			46th	200	

==== Whelen Modified Tour ====
NASCAR Whelen Modified Tour results
Year	Car owner	No.	Make	1	2	3	4	5	6	7	8	9	10	11	12	13	14	15	16	17	18	NWMTC	Pts	Ref
2005	Kenny Horton	29	Chevy	TMP	STA	RIV	WFD; 16	STA; 8	JEN	NHA	BEE	SEE	RIV	STA	TMP	WFD	MAR	TMP	NHA	STA	TMP	53rd	257	
2006	Don King	28	Chevy	TMP; 6	STA; 7	JEN; 12	TMP; 3	STA; 24	NHA; 2	HOL; 10	RIV; 17	STA; 1*	TMP; 31	MAR; 3	TMP; 14	NHA; 3	WFD; 14	TMP; 30	STA; 22			7th	2087	
2007	Don King	28	Chevy	TMP; 1	STA; 7	WTO; 20	STA; 2	TMP; 7	NHA; 35	TSA; 1*	RIV; 5	STA; 25	TMP; 26	MAN; 1*	MAR; 3	NHA; 6	TMP; 5	STA; 6	TMP; 32			6th	2178	
2008	Don King	28	Chevy	**TMP**; 6	STA; 5	STA; 8	TMP; 28	NHA; 29	SPE; 26	RIV; 27	STA	TMP	MAN	TMP	NHA	MAR	CHE	STA	TMP			32nd	769	
2009	Hill Enterprises	91	Pontiac	TMP	STA	STA	NHA	SPE	RIV	STA	BRI; 27											30th	676	
2009	Hill Enterprises	79	Pontiac									TMP; 25	NHA; 13	MAR; 10	STA; 4	TMP; 25						30th	676	
2010	Hill Enterprises	79	Pontiac	TMP; 29	STA; 8	STA; 27	MAR; 6	NHA; 7	LIM	MND; 7	RIV; 24	STA	TMP; 12	BRI	NHA; 17	STA	TMP; 10					20th	1206	
2011	Hill Enterprises	79	Pontiac	TMP; 17	STA; 25	STA; 9	MND; 5	TMP; 9	NHA; 14	RIV; 21	STA; 15	NHA; 19	BRI; 4	DEL; 4	TMP; 2	LRP; 20	NHA; 26	STA				16th	1826	
2011	Don King	28	Chevy																TMP; 32			16th	1826	
2014	Hill Enterprises	29	Pontiac	TMP	STA	STA	WFD	RIV	NHA	MND	STA	TMP	BRI	NHA	STA	TMP; 26						48th	18	
2015	Hill Enterprises	79	Pontiac	TMP	STA	WAT	STA	TMP	RIV; 28	NHA	MON	STA	TMP	BRI								37th	108	
2015	Robert Katon Jr.	13	Chevy												RIV; 15	NHA; 27	STA; 16	TMP; 26				37th	108	
2019	Hill Enterprises	79	Chevy	MYR	SBO; 22	TMP	STA	WAL	SEE	TMP	RIV	NHA	STA	TMP	OSW	RIV	NHA	STA	TMP			65th	22	

==== Whelen Southern Modified Tour ====
NASCAR Whelen Southern Modified Tour results
Year	Car owner	No.	Make	1	2	3	4	5	6	7	8	9	10	11	12	13	14	NSWMTC	Pts	Ref
2007	Hill Enterprises	79	Chevy	CRW	FAI	GRE	CRW	CRW; 5	BGS	MAR	ACE	CRW	SNM	CRW	CRW			39th	155	
2008	Don King	26	Chevy	CRW; 22	ACE	CRW	BGS	CRW	LAN	CRW	SNM	MAR	CRW	CRW				43rd	97	
2010	Hill Enterprises	79	Pontiac	ATL; 6		SBO; 1*	CRW; 3	BGS; 13	**BRI**; 1*	CRW; 7	LGY; 2*	TRI; 5	CLT; 16					3rd	1575	
2010	Hill Enterprises	79	Chevy		CRW; 3													3rd	1575	
2011	Hill Enterprises	79	Pontiac	CRW; 5	HCY; 3	SBO; 14	CRW; 10	CRW	BGS	BRI	CRW	LGY	THO	TRI	CRW	CLT	CRW	17th	580	
2015	Hill Enterprises	79	Chevy	CRW	CRW	SBO	LGY	CRW	BGS	BRI; 2	LGY							21st	105	
2015	Hill Enterprises	79	Pontiac									SBO; 10	CLT; 15					21st	105	
2016	Hill Enterprises	79	Pontiac	CRW	CON	SBO	CRW	CRW	BGS; 17			SBO; 1	CRW	CLT; 3				15th	151	
2016	Hill Enterprises	79S	Pontiac							BRI; 8	ECA							15th	151	

=== SMART Modified Tour ===
SMART Modified Tour results
Year	Car owner	No.	Make	1	2	3	4	5	6	7	8	9	10	11	12	13	SMTC	Pts	Ref
2021	Hill Enterprises	79	N/A	CRW	FLO; DNS	SBO; 9	FCS; 2	CRW; 6*	DIL; 14	CAR; 12	CRW; 15	DOM	PUL; 17	HCY; 9	ACE; 5		9th	183	
2023	Hill Enterprises	79	N/A	FLO	CRW	SBO	HCY	FCS; 17	CRW	ACE	CAR	PUL	TRI	SBO	ROU		47th	25	
2026	N/A	79J	N/A	FLO	AND	SBO	DOM	HCY	WKS	FCR; 10	CRW						21st	133	
2026	Hill Enterprises	79	N/A									PUL; 11	CAR	ROU; 11	TRI; 18	NWS; 23	21st	133	
