= Rob Fuller (racing driver) =

American racing driver

- Born: June 29, 1973 (age 53); Boylston, Massachusetts, U.S.

NASCAR FedEx Freight Truck Series career
- 4 races run over 1 year
- Best finish: 51st (2009)
- First race: 2009 AAA Insurance 200 (Indianapolis)
- Last race: 2009 Kroger 200 (Martinsville)
| Wins | Top tens | Poles |
|---|---|---|
| 0 | 0 | 0 |
- Statistics up to date as of August 6, 2024.

Rob Fuller (born June 29, 1973) is an American former professional stock car racing driver who competed in the NASCAR Camping World Truck Series and the NASCAR Whelen Modified Tour.

Fuller is also the owner of LFR Chassis, Troyer Racecars, TFR Distribution, LFR Driver Development Group that fielded cars for drivers such as William Byron, Riley Herbst and Christian Eckes among others. He has also fielded his own Modified Tour team, NASCAR Craftsman Truck Team, NASCAR Xfinity teams, NASCAR Cup team and has previously worked as a crew member for Team Penske, Dale Earnhardt Inc and Hendrick Motorsports.

Fuller has previously competed in series such as the now defunct NASCAR Whelen Southern Modified Tour, the UARA STARS Late Model Series, and the World Series of Asphalt Stock Car Racing.

Fuller also owns a vast amount of commercial real estate in central MA under RJF Commercial Properties and Page Fuller Properties.

== Motorsports results ==
=== NASCAR ===
(key) (Bold – Pole position awarded by qualifying time. Italics – Pole position earned by points standings or practice time. * – Most laps led.)

==== Camping World Truck Series ====
NASCAR Camping World Truck Series results
| Year | Team | No. | Make | 1 | 2 | 3 | 4 | 5 | 6 | 7 | 8 | 9 | 10 | 11 | 12 | 13 | 14 | 15 | 16 | 17 | 18 | 19 | 20 | 21 | 22 | 23 | 24 | 25 | NCWTC | Pts | Ref |
|---|---|---|---|---|---|---|---|---|---|---|---|---|---|---|---|---|---|---|---|---|---|---|---|---|---|---|---|---|---|---|---|
| 2009 | Rob Fuller Motorsports | 71 | Chevy | DAY | CAL | ATL | MAR | KAN | CLT | DOV | TEX | MCH | MLW | MEM | KEN | IRP; 20 | NSH | BRI; 33 | CHI | IOW | GTW | NHA; 25 | LVS | MAR; 32 | TAL | TEX | PHO | HOM | 51st | 322 | |

==== Whelen Modified Tour ====
NASCAR Whelen Modified Tour results
| Year | Car owner | No. | Make | 1 | 2 | 3 | 4 | 5 | 6 | 7 | 8 | 9 | 10 | 11 | 12 | 13 | 14 | 15 | 16 | NWMTC | Pts | Ref |
|---|---|---|---|---|---|---|---|---|---|---|---|---|---|---|---|---|---|---|---|---|---|---|
| 2009 | Rob Fuller | 71 | Ford | TMP | STA | STA | NHA; 33 | SPE | RIV | STA | BRI | TMP | NHA; 34 | MAR | STA | TMP | | | | 52nd | 125 | |
| 2010 | Rob Fuller | 71 | Ford | TMP; 17 | STA | STA | MAR; 31 | NHA; 35 | LIM | MND | RIV | STA | TMP | BRI | NHA | STA | TMP | | | 40th | 240 | |
| 2011 | Rob Fuller | 71 | Ford | TMP; 32 | STA | STA | MND | TMP | NHA; 33 | RIV | STA | NHA | BRI | DEL | TMP | LRP | NHA; 13 | STA | TMP; 20 | 33rd | 358 | |
| 2012 | Rob Fuller | 71 | Ford | TMP; 25 | STA | MND | STA | WFD | NHA; 17 | STA | TMP; 15 | BRI | TMP | RIV | NHA; 31 | STA | TMP; 26 | | | 28th | 106 | |
| 2013 | Rob Fuller | 15 | Chevy | TMP; 28 | STA | STA | WFD | RIV | NHA; 23 | MND | STA | TMP; 25 | BRI; 18 | RIV | NHA; 21 | STA | TMP; 28 | | | 29th | 121 | |
| 2014 | Rob Fuller | 15 | Chevy | TMP; 13 | STA | STA | WFD | RIV | NHA | MND | STA | TMP | BRI | NHA | STA | TMP | | | | 41st | 31 | |

==== Whelen Southern Modified Tour ====
NASCAR Whelen Southern Modified Tour results
| Year | Car owner | No. | Make | 1 | 2 | 3 | 4 | 5 | 6 | 7 | 8 | 9 | 10 | 11 | 12 | 13 | 14 | NSWMTC | Pts | Ref |
|---|---|---|---|---|---|---|---|---|---|---|---|---|---|---|---|---|---|---|---|---|
| 2011 | Rob Fuller | 71 | Ford | CRW | HCY | SBO | CRW | CRW | BGS | BRI | CRW | LGY | THO; 18 | TRI | CRW | CLT | CRW | 42nd | 107 | |
| 2012 | Rob Fuller | 71 | Ford | CRW | CRW | SBO | CRW | CRW | BGS | BRI | LGY | **THO**; 3 | CRW | CLT | | | | 35th | 41 | |
