= 2008 NASCAR Whelen Southern Modified Tour =

The 2008 NASCAR Whelen Southern Modified Tour was the fourth season of the NASCAR Whelen Southern Modified Tour (WSMT). It began with the Whelen Southern Modified Tour 150 at Caraway Speedway on March 22. It ended with the Whelen 150 at Caraway again on October 4. L. W. Miller entered the season as the defending championship. Brian Loftin would win his first and only championship in the series, 30 points ahead of series runner up Tim Brown.

== Schedule ==
No.	Race title	Track	Date
1	Whelen Southern Modified Tour 150	Caraway Speedway, Asheboro, North Carolina	March 22
2	Whelen Southern Modified Tour 150	Ace Speedway, Altamahaw, North Carolina	April 11
3	Whelen Southern Modified Tour 150	Caraway Speedway, Asheboro, North Carolina	April 12
4	Advance Auto Parts 199	Bowman Gray Stadium, Winston-Salem, North Carolina	August 2
5	Whelen Southern Modified Tour 150	Caraway Speedway, Asheboro, North Carolina	August 22
6	Lanier 150	Lanier Speedway, Braselton, Georgia	August 30
7	Whelen 150	Caraway Speedway, Asheboro, North Carolina	September 6
8	Night of the Modifieds 150	Southern National Motorsports Park, Kenly, North Carolina	September 13
9	Made In America Whelen 300 (Note: The Made In America Whelen 300 was held as a combined event, with competitors from the Whelen Modified Tour competing along with competitors for the Whelen Modified Tour. The race was run with a series-based point distribution, where drivers received points and statistical credit for their finish relative to other drivers in their series, not to the whole field in general.)	Martinsville Speedway, Martinsville, Virginia	September 20
10	Whelen Southern Modified Tour 150	Caraway Speedway, Asheboro, North Carolina	September 27
11	Whelen 150	Caraway Speedway, Asheboro, North Carolina	October 4

== Results and standings ==
=== Races ===
No.	Race	Pole position	Most laps led	Winning driver	Manufacturer
1	Whelen Southern Modified Tour 150	Tim Brown	L. W. Miller	L. W. Miller	Pontiac
2	Whelen Southern Modified Tour 150	L. W. Miller	L. W. Miller	L. W. Miller	Pontiac
3	Whelen Southern Modified Tour 150	Burt Myers	Andy Seuss	Brian Loftin	Chevrolet
4	Advance Auto Parts 199	Burt Myers	Brian Loftin	Brian Loftin	Chevrolet
5	Whelen Southern Modified Tour 150	Andy Seuss	Brian Loftin	Brian Loftin	Chevrolet
6	Lanier 150	George Brunnhoelzl III	George Brunnhoelzl III	George Brunnhoelzl III	Ford
7	Whelen 150	Burt Myers	L. W. Miller	Tim Brown	Chevrolet
8	Night of the Modifieds 150	L. W. Miller	L. W. Miller	Burt Myers	Chevrolet
9	Made In America Whelen 300	Ryan Preece	Ryan Preece	Ryan Preece	Chevrolet
10	Whelen Southern Modified Tour 150	Tim Brown	L. W. Miller	Tim Brown	Chevrolet
11	Whelen 150	Tim Brown	Andy Seuss	Andy Seuss	Dodge

=== Drivers' championship ===
(key) Bold - Pole position awarded by time. Italics - Pole position set by final practice results or rainout. * – Most laps led.

Pos	Driver	CRW	ACE	CRW	BGS	CRW	LAN	CRW	SNM	MAR	CRW	CRW	Points
1	Brian Loftin	3	17	1	1**	1*	4	2	15	9	2	3	1780
2	Tim Brown	**4**	7	17	3	8	5	1	2	11	**1**	**2**	1750
3	L. W. Miller	1*	**1***	7	8	7	3	18*	**3***	12	6*	6	1698
4	Andy Seuss	10	21	2*	5	**18**	9	3	4	30	4	1*	1617
5	Jason Myers	7	4	12	18	4	8	7	6	28	17	4	1562
6	Frank Fleming	9	9	3	14	21	2	4	10	36	7	7	1552
7	George Brunnhoelzl III	26	15	4	25	6	**1***	13	5	16	3	5	1540
8	John Smith	19	19	14	7	9	12	15	9	35	15	8	1398
9	Burt Myers	25	3	**5**	**2**	2	6	6	1		12		1355
10	Rick Kuiken Jr.	DNQ	13	16	17	19	15	16	14	20	21	13	1257
11	Buddy Emory	16	20		11	12	10	14	7	42	14	16	1233
12	Bobby Hutchens	23	18	10	4	16		12	11	38	13	18	1232
13	Brian King	12	6	8	16	5	7	5	12				1117
14	Scott Rigney	DNQ	8	18	21	20	16	21	13	DNQ	22		1069
15	Jay Mize	DNQ	12	9	19	13	14	17			8	10	1068
16	Thomas Stinson	13		11	12	11			8		16	17	880
17	Brandon Hire	15	14	15	9	15	13	8					879
18	Zach Brewer	18			6	10		11		39	18	15	877
19	Jay Foley	21	5			14		9		32		22	753
20	Gene Pack	DNQ	10	20	22						10	9	679
21	Ron Silk	6	2	6			11			24^{1}			600
22	Brandon Ward					3		10			5	14	575
23	Junior Miller	24		21	15						11	11	569
24	Sean Gartner					22	17			41	23		427
25	Dean Ward				24	17		19				21	409
26	Jamie Tomaino Jr.									DNQ	19	12	348
27	Brian Pack	DNQ	11	13									333
28	Bryan Dauzat							22		DNQ	20		318
29	Jason Trinchere										9	19	244
30	Jonathan Brown		16		20								218
31	Johnny Sutton	17		19									218
32	Ted Christopher	2								4^{1}			170
33	Bobby Grigas III	5								26^{1}			155
34	Matt Hirschman	8								2^{1}			142
35	Brent Elliott				10								134
36	Rowan Pennink	11								8^{1}			130
37	Al Hill				13								124
38	Kevin Goodale	14								17^{1}			121
39	Bradley Robbins									DNQ^{2}			112
40	J. R. Bertuccio	20											103
41	Sam Beam							20					103
42	Mike Herman Jr.											20	103
43	James Civali	22											97
44	Randy Butner				23								94
45	Josh Nichols											DNQ^{2}	94
46	Kevin Powell				26								85
47	Earl Baker	DNQ^{2}											82
48	Erick Rudolph	DNQ^{2}											76
	Sean Patterson									DNQ			
Drivers ineligible for NWSMT points, because at the combined event at Martinsville they chose to drive for NWMT points
	Ryan Preece									**1***			
	Reggie Ruggiero									3			
	Todd Szegedy									5			
	Woody Pitkat									6			
	Ed Flemke Jr.									7			
	Jamie Tomaino									10			
	Eric Goodale									13			
	Eric Beers									14			
	Glenn Tyler									15			
	Joe Hartmann									18			
	Chuck Hossfeld									19			
	Tom Abele Jr.									21			
	Danny Sammons									22			
	Mike Stefanik									23			
	Jimmy Blewett									25			
	Wade Cole									27			
	Ken Heagy									29			
	Billy Pauch Jr.									31			
	Rick Fuller									33			
	Glen Reen									34			
	Richard Savary									37			
	Jake Marosz									40			
Pos	Driver	CRW	ACE	CRW	BGS	CRW	LAN	CRW	SNM	MAR	CRW	CRW	Points

- ^{1} – Scored points towards the Whelen Modified Tour.
- ^{2} – Bradley Robbins, Josh Nichols, Earl Baker, and Erick Rudolph received championship points, despite the fact that the driver did not qualify for the race.

== See also ==
- 2008 NASCAR Sprint Cup Series
- 2008 NASCAR Nationwide Series
- 2008 NASCAR Craftsman Truck Series
- 2008 NASCAR Camping World East Series
- 2008 NASCAR Camping World West Series
- 2008 ARCA Re/Max Series
- 2008 NASCAR Whelen Modified Tour
- 2008 NASCAR Canadian Tire Series
- 2008 NASCAR Corona Series
