= 2007 NASCAR Whelen Southern Modified Tour =

The 2007 NASCAR Whelen Southern Modified Tour was the third season of the NASCAR Whelen Southern Modified Tour (WSMT). It began with the Whelen Southern Modified Tour 150 at Caraway Speedway on March 24. It ended with the Whelen Southern Modified Tour 150 at Caraway again on October 6. Junior Miller entered the season as the defending championship. L. W. Miller would win his first and only championship in the series, 25 points ahead of series runner up Tim Brown.

== Schedule ==
No.	Race title	Track	Date
1	Whelen Southern Modified Tour 150	Caraway Speedway, Asheboro, North Carolina	March 24
2	Whelen 150	Nashville Fairgrounds Speedway, Nashville, Tennessee	April 1
3	Whelen Southern Modified Tour 150	Greenville-Pickens Speedway, Greenville, South Carolina	April 7
4	Night of the Southern Modifieds 150	Caraway Speedway, Asheboro, North Carolina	April 21
5	Whelen Southern Modified Tour 150	Caraway Speedway, Asheboro, North Carolina	July 7
6	Advance Auto Parts 199	Bowman Gray Stadium, Winston-Salem, North Carolina	August 4
7	Made In America Whelen 300 (Note: The Made In America Whelen 300 was held as a combined event, with competitors from the Whelen Modified Tour competing along with competitors for the Whelen Modified Tour. The race was run with a series-based point distribution, where drivers received points and statistical credit for their finish relative to other drivers in their series, not to the whole field in general.)	Martinsville Speedway, Martinsville, Virginia	September 1
8	DMC Auto Exchange 150	Ace Speedway, Altamahaw, North Carolina	September 3
9	Whelen Southern Modified Tour 150	Caraway Speedway, Asheboro, North Carolina	September 8
10	Southern National Raceway Park 150	Southern National Motorsports Park, Kenly, North Carolina	September 15
11	Whelen Southern Modified Tour 150	Caraway Speedway, Asheboro, North Carolina	September 22
12	Whelen Southern Modified Tour 150	Caraway Speedway, Asheboro, North Carolina	October 6

== Results and standings ==
=== Races ===
No.	Race	Pole position	Most laps led	Winning driver	Manufacturer
1	Whelen Southern Modified Tour 150	Burt Myers	L. W. Miller	L. W. Miller	Pontiac
2	Whelen 150	Burt Myers	Andy Seuss	Andy Seuss	Chevrolet
3	Whelen Southern Modified Tour 150	Burt Myers	Matt Hirschman	Junior Miller	Dodge
4	Night of the Southern Modifieds 150	Burt Myers	Jason Myers	L. W. Miller	Pontiac
5	Whelen Southern Modified Tour 150	Burt Myers	L. W. Miller	L. W. Miller	Pontiac
6	Advance Auto Parts 199	Tim Brown	Frank Fleming	Burt Myers	Chevrolet
7	Made In America Whelen 300	Donny Lia	Donny Lia	Donny Lia	Dodge
8	DMC Auto Exchange 150	Tim Brown	Tim Brown	Tim Brown	Chevrolet
9	Whelen Southern Modified Tour 150	Burt Myers	Junior Miller	L. W. Miller	Pontiac
10	Southern National Raceway Park 150	Frank Fleming	Tim Brown	Tim Brown	Chevrolet
11	Whelen Southern Modified Tour 150	Brian Loftin	Brian Loftin	Brian Loftin	Chevrolet
12	Whelen Southern Modified Tour 150	Brian Loftin	Brian Loftin	Brian Loftin	Chevrolet

=== Drivers' championship ===
(key) Bold - Pole position awarded by time. Italics - Pole position set by final practice results or rainout. * – Most laps led.

Pos	Driver	CRW	NSV	GRE	CRW	CRW	BGS	MAR	ACE	CRW	SNM	CRW	CRW	Points
1	L. W. Miller	1*	2	24	1	1*	10	3	2	1	4	5	6	1930
2	Tim Brown	8	6	3	15	6	**4**	5	1*	5	1*	3	2	1905
3	Burt Myers	**2**	**8**	**6**	**3**	**7**	1	22	**4**	8	5	12	12	1798
4	Junior Miller	6	4	1	4	11	3	15	20	3*	3	10	17	1766
5	Brian King	21	5	18	6	3	7	6	6	4	10	7	9	1718
6	Jason Myers	20	12	7	2*	8	9	12	12	6	15	4	4	1694
7	Frank Fleming	23	14	22	5	2	16*	30	9	2	**2**	2	3	1692
8	George Brunnhoelzl III	9	13	12	9	14	6	11	8	12	8	20	8	1609
9	Brian Pack	16	18	2	8	20	5	29	18	7	9	14	5	1593
10	Gene Pack	15	11	20	11	18	13	DNQ	19	9	12	9	10	1475
11	Wesley Swartout	17	7	16	16	15	23	DNQ	17	14	16	19	11	1399
12	Brian Loftin	3	17			17	11	36	3	18		**1***	**1***	1277
13	Thomas Stinson	DNQ		14	18	12	24	DNQ	10	11	6	13	22	1256
14	Brandon Hire					4	19	13	16	16	7	8	21	1030
15	Earl Baker	12	15	21			18	DNQ		10	13	16		936
16	John Smith	7		10			2		7			6	16	861
17	Jay Foley	22			14			9	11		14	15	20	850
18	Jay Mize					16		DNQ	13	13	11	21	13	820
19	Bobby Hutchens	19	10	9	7	10	12							782
20	Jason Trinchere	DNQ		13	12			DNQ	14				19	660
21	Rich Kuiken Jr.		19	17	13	13	15							584
22	Andy Seuss		1*	4	19	19								552
23	Buddy Emory			19				21		17	17			538
24	Zach Brewer					9	8	40				11		531
25	Dean Ward					21				15		18	7	473
26	Michael Clifton	11			17					19				445
27	Brandon Ward	DNQ	3	5										402
28	Chuck Hossfeld	24	9	8										371
29	Greg Butcher	13	16	15										357
30	Randy Butner						20	DNQ	15					318
31	Matt Hirschman	4		11*				26^{1}						290
32	Bradley Robbins	DNQ^{2}						DNQ^{2}						288
33	Woody Pitkat							35^{1}	5				14	276
34	Kevin Powell	10					14							255
35	Chris Fleming				10								15	252
36	Johnny Sutton											17	18	221
37	Jonathan Brown			23			21							194
38	Ryan Preece	5						28^{1}						155
39	James Civali					5		4^{1}						155
40	Bobby Grigas III	14						14^{1}						121
41	Al Hill						17							112
42	Ted Christopher	18						2^{1}						109
43	Alex Hoag						22							97
44	Jamie Tomaino	25						19^{1}						88
45	J. R. Bertuccio	26												85
Drivers ineligible for NWSMT points, because at the combined event at Martinsville they chose to drive for NWMT points
	Donny Lia							**1***						
	Richard Houlihan							7						
	Rowan Pennink							8						
	Richard Savary							10						
	Joe Hartmann							16						
	Jerry Marquis							17						
	Eric Beers							18						
	Ron Silk							20						
	Billy Pauch Jr.							23						
	Ed Flemke Jr.							24						
	Todd Szegedy							25						
	Doug Coby							27						
	Reggie Ruggiero							31						
	Bobby Santos III							32						
	Danny Sammons							33						
	Mike Stefanik							34						
	Kevin Goodale							37						
	Anthony Sesely							38						
	Wade Cole							39						
	Glenn Tyler							41						
	Jake Marosz							42						
	Jimmy Blewett							43						
Pos	Driver	CRW	NSV	GRE	CRW	CRW	BGS	MAR	ACE	CRW	SNM	CRW	CRW	Points

- ^{1} – Scored points towards the Whelen Modified Tour.
- ^{2} – Bradley Robbins received championship points, despite the fact that the driver did not qualify for the race.

== See also ==
- 2007 NASCAR Nextel Cup Series
- 2007 NASCAR Busch Series
- 2007 NASCAR Craftsman Truck Series
- 2007 NASCAR Busch East Series
- 2007 ARCA Re/Max Series
- 2007 NASCAR Whelen Modified Tour
- 2007 NASCAR Canadian Tire Series
- 2007 NASCAR Corona Series
