= 2009 NASCAR Whelen Southern Modified Tour =

The 2009 NASCAR Whelen Southern Modified Tour was the fifth season of the NASCAR Whelen Southern Modified Tour (WSMT). It began with the Capital Bank 150 at Concord Speedway on March 21. It ended with the Fall Classic 150 at Caraway Speedway on October 24. Brian Loftin entered the season as the defending championship. George Brunnhoelzl III would win his first championship in the series, 180 points ahead of series runner up Andy Seuss.

== Schedule ==
No.	Race title	Track	Date
1	Capitol Bank 150	Concord Speedway, Midland, North Carolina	March 21
2	Whelen Southern Modified Tour 150	South Boston Speedway, South Boston, Virginia	April 4
3	Caraway Speedway 150	Caraway Speedway, Asheboro, North Carolina	April 11
4	Lanier 150	Lanier Speedway, Braselton, Georgia	April 18
5	Firecracker 150	Caraway Speedway, Asheboro, North Carolina	July 3
6	Advance Auto Parts 199	Bowman Gray Stadium, Winston-Salem, North Carolina	August 1
7	UNOH Perfect Storm (Note: The UNOH Perfect Storm was held as a combined event, with competitors from the Whelen Southern Modified Tour competing along with competitors for the Whelen Modified Tour. The race was run with a series-based point distribution, where drivers received points and statistical credit for their finish relative to other drivers in their series, not to the whole field in general.)	Bristol Motor Speedway, Bristol, Tennessee	August 19
8	Caraway 150	Caraway Speedway, Asheboro, North Carolina	August 29
9	Myrtle Beach 150	Myrtle Beach Speedway, Myrtle Beach, South Carolina	September 5
10	Caraway 150	Caraway Speedway, Asheboro, North Carolina	September 12
11	Caraway Classic 150	Caraway Speedway, Asheboro, North Carolina	September 19
12	Made In America Whelen 300 (Note: The Made In America Whelen 300 was held as a combined event, with competitors from the Whelen Modified Tour competing along with competitors for the Whelen Modified Tour. The race was run with a series-based point distribution, where drivers received points and statistical credit for their finish relative to other drivers in their series, not to the whole field in general.)	Martinsville Speedway, Martinsville, Virginia	September 27
13	Lightning Fast 150	Ace Speedway, Altamahaw, North Carolina	October 2
14	Fall Classic 150	Caraway Speedway, Asheboro, North Carolina	October 24

== Results and standings ==
=== Races ===
No.	Race	Pole position	Most laps led	Winning driver	Manufacturer
1	Capitol Bank 150	Burt Myers	Ted Christopher	Ted Christopher	Chevrolet
2	Whelen Southern Modified Tour 150	George Brunnhoelzl III	Andy Seuss	Andy Seuss	Dodge
3	Caraway Speedway 150	George Brunnhoelzl III	George Brunnhoelzl III	Ted Christopher	Chevrolet
4	Lanier 150	George Brunnhoelzl III	Andy Seuss	Andy Seuss	Dodge
5	Firecracker 150	Andy Seuss	L. W. Miller	George Brunnhoelzl III	Ford
6	Advance Auto Parts 199	Brian Loftin	John Smith	Luke Fleming	Chevrolet
7	UNOH Perfect Storm	Ted Christopher	Ted Christopher	Donny Lia	Dodge
8	Caraway 150	George Brunnhoelzl III	Brian Loftin	Brian Loftin	Chevrolet
9	Myrtle Beach 150	George Brunnhoelzl III	Gene Pack	Andy Seuss	Dodge
10	Caraway 150	Burt Myers	George Brunnhoelzl III	George Brunnhoelzl III	Ford
11	Caraway Classic 150	Burt Myers	Andy Seuss	Andy Seuss	Dodge
12	Made In America Whelen 300	Ron Silk	Chris Pasteryak	Mike Stefanik	Pontiac
13	Lightning Fast 150	Burt Myers	George Brunnhoelzl III	George Brunnhoelzl III	Ford
14	Fall Classic 150	George Brunnhoelzl III	George Brunnhoelzl III	George Brunnhoelzl III	Ford

=== Drivers' championship ===
(key) Bold - Pole position awarded by time. Italics - Pole position set by final practice results or rainout. * – Most laps led.

Pos	Driver	CON	SBO	CRW	LAN	CRW	BGS	BRI	CRW	MYB	CRW	CRW	MAR	ACE	CRW	Points
1	George Brunnhoelzl III	3	**2**	**11***	**2**	1	2	4	**2**	**2**	1*	2	7	1*	**1***	2385
2	Andy Seuss	20	1*	2	1*	**3**	14	11	3	1	14	1*	21	2	6	2205
3	Burt Myers	**4**	3	10	9	9	12	9	7	11	**2**	**4**	5	**3**	5	2138
4	Brian Loftin	15	5	3	4	5	**9**	19	1*	6	15	3	29	4	8	2090
5	Frank Fleming	8	11	5	10	2	7	21	16	13	3	6	11	8	4	2044
6	Jason Myers	14	9	8	5	8	17	27	6	12	4	5	17	5	3	2016
7	John Smith	9	10	12	13	17	13*	23	5	7	5	7	24		2	1823
8	Gene Pack	19	8	16	12	10	3	29	10	5*	6	12	34	6		1762
9	Buddy Emory	12	15	20	6	7	18	38	8	3	8	9	27			1602
10	L. W. Miller	7	7	15	3	12*	4	13	4	4	16					1457
11	Rich Kuiken Jr.	13	12	14	14	13	16	24	11	8	12					1269
12	Bryan Dauzat		13	17		14	5	30	14		13	13	35		10	1266
13	J. R. Bertuccio	11	6	6	8	11						10	37	15		1075
14	Tommy Neal						15		15	10	11	14	39	11		866
15	Zach Brewer		16	21		6	19						38		7	735
16	Jay Mize	16				19			12			11		7		624
17	Jonathan Brown											8	25	13	9	550
18	Tim Brown	17	4	9	11								41			540
19	Ted Christopher	1*		1	7			2*^{1}					30^{1}			506
20	Ron Silk	10		4		4		33^{1}					**4**^{1}			454
21	Bobby Hutchens			13			10	18								413
22	Josh Nichols								9		9			12		403
23	Thomas Stinson					18					7			9		393
24	Dean Ward		14	22			6									368
25	Brandon Ward	6		23		16										359
26	Greg Butcher			19						9			40			356
27	Erick Rudolph	5		7				10^{1}					36^{1}			301
28	Rowan Pennink	2		24				7^{1}					16^{1}			261
29	Jim Willis								13		10					258
30	Mike Norman											15		10		252
31	Jay Foley			18									26			251
32	Scott Rigney					15	11									248
33	Lee Jeffreys											16			11	245
34	Luke Fleming						1									180
35	Randy Butner						8									142
36	Bradley Robbins												32			130
37	Tom McCann Jr.														12	127
38	Jay Hedgecock														13	124
39	Junior Miller													14		121
40	Jamie Tomaino	18						17^{1}					10^{1}			109
41	Jamie Tomaino Jr.												43			109
42	Brent Elliott						20									103
43	Jason Trinchere			25												88
Drivers ineligible for NWSMT points, because at the combined events they chose to drive for NWMT points
	Donny Lia							1					8			
	Mike Stefanik							25					1			
	Todd Szegedy							6					2			
	Ryan Preece							3					3			
	Woody Pitkat							5					20			
	Kevin Goodale												6			
	Ed Flemke Jr.							8					12			
	Eric Goodale							12					9			
	James Civali							40					13			
	Eric Beers							14					23			
	Jake Marosz							36					14			
	Chris Pasteryak							16					15*			
	Bobby Grigas III							15								
	Johnny Bush							22					18			
	Gary McDonald												19			
	Glen Reen							32					22			
	Ken Heagy							26					28			
	Kasey Kahne							28								
	Glenn Tyler							35					31			
	Jimmy Blewett							31								
	Wade Cole							34					33			
	Ryan Newman							37								
	Matt Hirschman							39								
	Jeremy Stoltz												42			
Pos	Driver	CON	SBO	CRW	LAN	CRW	BGS	BRI	CRW	MYB	CRW	CRW	MAR	ACE	CRW	Points

- ^{1} – Scored points towards the Whelen Modified Tour.

== See also ==
- 2009 NASCAR Sprint Cup Series
- 2009 NASCAR Nationwide Series
- 2009 NASCAR Camping World Truck Series
- 2009 NASCAR Camping World East Series
- 2009 NASCAR Camping World West Series
- 2009 ARCA Re/Max Series
- 2009 NASCAR Whelen Modified Tour
- 2009 NASCAR Canadian Tire Series
- 2009 NASCAR Mini Stock Series
- 2009 NASCAR Corona Series
