= 2011 NASCAR Whelen Modified Tour =

The 2011 NASCAR Whelen Modified Tour was the 27th season of the Whelen Modified Tour (WMT). It began with the Icebreaker 150 at Thompson Speedway Motorsports Park on April 10. It ended with the Sunoco World Series of Speedway Racing at Thompson again on October 16. Bobby Santos III entered the season as the defending Drivers' Champion. Ron Silk won the 2011 championship after 16 races, 76 points ahead of Todd Szegedy.

== Schedule ==
No.	Race title	Track	Date
1	Icebreaker 150	Thompson Speedway Motorsports Park, Thompson, Connecticut	April 10
2	Tech-Net Spring Sizzler Presented by CarQuest	Stafford Motor Speedway, Stafford, Connecticut	May 1
3	TSI Harley-Davidson 125	Stafford Motor Speedway, Stafford, Connecticut	May 27
4	Monadnock 200	Monadnock Speedway, Winchester, New Hampshire	June 26
5	Budweiser King of Beers 150	Thompson Speedway Motorsports Park, Thompson, Connecticut	June 30
6	F.W. Webb 100	New Hampshire Motor Speedway, Loudon, New Hampshire	July 16
7	Lighthouse Mission 200	Riverhead Raceway, Riverhead, New York	July 30
8	Town Fair Tire 150	Stafford Motor Speedway, Stafford, Connecticut	August 5
9	Granite State Classic	New Hampshire Motor Speedway, Loudon, New Hampshire	August 13
10	UNOH Perfect Storm 150 (Note: The UNOH Perfect Storm 150 was held as a combined event, with competitors from the Whelen Modified Tour competing along with competitors for the Whelen Southern Modified Tour. The race was run with a series-based point distribution, where drivers received points and statistical credit for their finish relative to other drivers in their series, not to the whole field in general.)	Bristol Motor Speedway, Bristol, Tennessee	August 24
11	Delaware 150	Delaware Speedway, Delaware, Ontario, Canada	September 4
12	Northern Thompson 125	Thompson Speedway Motorsports Park, Thompson, Connecticut	September 11
13	Whelen Modified 66/99 Pres. by Town Fair Tire	Lime Rock Park, Lakeville, Connecticut	September 17
14	New Hampshire 100	New Hampshire Motor Speedway, Loudon, New Hampshire	September 24
15	CarQuest Fall Final	Stafford Motor Speedway, Stafford, Connecticut	October 2
16	Sunoco World Series of Speedway Racing	Thompson Speedway Motorsports Park, Thompson, Connecticut	October 16

== Results and standings ==
=== Races ===
No.	Race	Pole position	Most laps led	Winning driver	Manufacturer
1	Icebreaker 150	Bobby Santos III	Ted Christopher	Ted Christopher	Chevrolet
2	Tech-Net Spring Sizzler Presented by CarQuest	Doug Coby	Bobby Santos III	Bobby Santos III	Dodge
3	TSI Harley-Davidson 125	Ron Silk	Ron Silk	Ron Silk	Chevrolet
4	Monadnock 200	Todd Szegedy	Todd Szegedy	Todd Szegedy	Ford
5	Budweiser King of Beers 150	Ted Christopher	Rowan Pennink	Ted Christopher	Chevrolet
6	F.W. Webb 100	Ryan Newman	Ryan Newman	Todd Szegedy (Note: Ryan Newman originally won the pole, led the most laps and won the race, he would to disqualified due a post race technical violation, and was omitted from the results entirely. Todd Szegedy, who originally finished second, was inherited the win.)	Ford
7	Lighthouse Mission 200	Howie Brode	Justin Bonsignore	Justin Bonsignore	Chevrolet
8	Town Fair Tire 150	Doug Coby	Doug Coby	Ted Christopher	Chevrolet
9	Granite State Classic	Bobby Santos III	Bobby Santos III	Mike Stefanik	Pontiac
10	UNOH Perfect Storm 150	Bobby Santos III	Ryan Newman	Ryan Newman	Chevrolet
11	Delaware 150	Erick Rudolph	Erick Rudolph	Ron Silk	Chevrolet
12	Northern Thompson 125	Ryan Preece	Doug Coby	Doug Coby	Chevrolet
13	Whelen Modified 66/99 Pres. by Town Fair Tire	Todd Szegedy	Todd Szegedy	Todd Szegedy	Ford
14	New Hampshire 100	Ron Silk	Ron Silk	Ron Silk	Chevrolet
15	CarQuest Fall Final	Justin Bonsignore	Justin Bonsignore	Ted Christopher	Chevrolet
16	Sunoco World Series of Speedway Racing	Ryan Preece	Doug Coby	Glen Reen	Chevrolet

=== Drivers' championship ===
(key) Bold - Pole position awarded by time. Italics - Pole position set by final practice results or rainout. * – Most laps led.

Pos	Driver	THO	STA	STA	MON	THO	NHA	RIV	STA	NHA	BRI	DEL	THO	LMP	NHA	STA	THO	Points
1	Ron Silk	23	3	**1***	4	2	2	3	7	11	7	1	9	15	**1***	7	16	2443
2	Todd Szegedy	22	24	6	**1****	6	1	2	14	3	3	3	5	**1***	2	21	25	2367
3	Eric Beers	6	4	11	12	8	11	11	4	5	6	5	17	8	5	4	7	2309
4	Rowan Pennink	2	2	2	10	3*	5	6	6	16	21	18	8	6	22	12	28	2219
5	Doug Coby	7	**29**	8	11	7	4	5	**9***	10	25	2	1*	18	16	9	15*	2214
6	Matt Hirschman	9	8	10	3	12	3	13	13	22	13	12	15	12	9	8	3	2163
7	Justin Bonsignore	5	28	17	2	24	31	1*	11	4	2	7	10	3	3	**10***	21	2141
8	Bobby Santos III	**33**	1*	3	15	4	12	9	3	**6***	**26**	11	13	17	18	27	2	2133
9	Ted Christopher	1*	7	4	6	**1**	10	17	1	28			4	5	4	1	22	2053
10	Erick Rudolph	20	6	5	9	15	16	24	8	9	31	**14***	25	7	6	5	14	2051
11	Mike Stefanik	3	5	15	7	26	27	22	2	1	24		19	2	8	30	9	1957
12	Eric Goodale	24	11	21	18	10	6	15	5	24	10	13	7	19	10	24	10	1955
13	Patrick Emerling	10	23	25	19	25	30	8	17	13	5	10	12	10	17	23	8	1859
14	Jamie Tomaino	30	14	20	14	17	18	7	16	14	20	9	16	14	21	15	17	1854
15	Ed Flemke Jr.	11	16	27	26	13	8	14	26	17	18	17	11	11	12	11	23	1851
16	James Civali	17	25	9	5	9	14	21	15	19	4	4	2	20	26		32	1826
17	Eric Berndt	28	20	12	16	5	13	16	23	27	11	6	24	13	23	26	27	1763
18	Wade Cole	16	22	23	28	20	24	DNQ	25	30	22	15	21	16	24	19	11	1594
19	Bryon Chew	29	12	18	24	27	17	25	12	12	30		23	21	20	25	30	1500
20	Richie Pallai Jr.	19	21	14	21	16	21	10	21	18				4	25	13		1357
21	Ken Heagy	13	13	19	25	21	20	20	28	31			22		19	14	24	1312
22	Ryan Preece	4	17	24			26	4		7			**3**		14	2	**26**	1310
23	Woody Pitkat	25	10	22		18	9		22	2	12		14		27		19	1286
24	Ron Yuhas Jr.	8	19	16	8	11	7	18	18	21	34							1193
25	Gary McDonald	21	27	29	27	23	25	DNQ	24	15	27					18	13	1140
26	Kevin Goodale	26	26	30			15	28		23			18	9		6	29	1007
27	Tom Rogers Jr.	27	9	28		14			19				6			17	5	948
28	Glenn Tyler	14	15	13	23		22			8					15	16		929
29	Jimmy Blewett	DNQ	18	31			29		10	29			20					629
30	Glen Reen				13		23		20							20	1	609
31	Chuck Hossfeld	12	30	7												28	4	585
32	Dave Etheridge	15	31	26	20	19												482
33	Rob Fuller	32					33								13		20	358
34	Donny Lia							26		25						3		338
35	Andy Seuss				17		19			20	9^{1}							321
36	Jake Marosz							DNQ	27	26					29			316
37	Rick Gentes	18				22											31	276
38	Ryan Newman						**DSQ***				1*				28			269
39	Andy Petree						32				33							164
40	Keith Rocco																6	150
41	Zane Zeiner														7			146
42	D. J. Kennington											8						142
43	Tony Ferrante Jr.	31															34	131
44	Ken Woolley Jr.														11			130
45	Dave Brigati							12										127
46	Jimmy Zacharias																12	127
47	Cole Powell											16						115
48	Daniel Hemric										32^{1}						18	109
49	Shawn Solomito							19										106
50	Howie Brode							**23**										99
51	Renee Dupuis				22													97
52	Glenn Griswold															22		97
53	George Brunnhoelzl III							27			29^{1}							82
54	Dale Quarterley						28											79
55	Chris Kopec															29		76
56	Chuck Steuer							DNQ^{2}										67
57	Timmy Solomito																33	64
Drivers ineligible for NWMT points, because at the combined event at Bristol they chose to drive for NWSMT points
	Frank Fleming										8							
	Jason Myers										14							
	Austin Pack										15							
	John Smith										16							
	Burt Myers										17							
	L. W. Miller										19							
	Tim Brown										23							
	Corey LaJoie										28							
Pos	Driver	THO	STA	STA	MON	THO	NHA	RIV	STA	NHA	BRI	DEL	THO	LMP	NHA	STA	THO	Points

Notes

- ^{1} – Scored points towards the Whelen Southern Modified Tour.
- ^{2} – Chuck Steuer received championship points, despite the fact that the driver did not qualify for the race.

== See also ==
- 2011 NASCAR Sprint Cup Series
- 2011 NASCAR Nationwide Series
- 2011 NASCAR Camping World Truck Series
- 2011 ARCA Racing Series
- 2011 NASCAR Whelen Southern Modified Tour
- 2011 NASCAR Canadian Tire Series
- 2011 NASCAR Stock V6 Series
- 2011 NASCAR Corona Series
