= 2008 NASCAR Whelen Modified Tour =

The 2008 NASCAR Whelen Modified Tour was the 24th season of the Whelen Modified Tour (WMT). It began with the Icebreaker 150 at Thompson Speedway Motorsports Park on April 6. It ended with the Xtra Mart World Series at Thompson again on October 19. Donny Lia entered the season as the defending Drivers' Champion. Ted Christopher won the 2008 championship after 16 races, 127 points ahead of Matt Hirschman.

== Schedule ==
No.	Race title	Track	Date
1	Icebreaker 150	Thompson Speedway Motorsports Park, Thompson, Connecticut	April 5
2	Spring Sizzler	Stafford Motor Speedway, Stafford, Connecticut	April 27
3	TSI Harley-Davidson 150	Stafford Motor Speedway, Stafford, Connecticut	May 23
4	New England Dodge Dealers 75	Thompson Speedway Motorsports Park, Thompson, Connecticut	June 19
5	New England 100	New Hampshire Motor Speedway, Loudon, New Hampshire	June 28
6	Mason Farms 100	Spencer Speedway, Williamson, New York	July 12
7	Miller Lite 140	Riverhead Raceway, Riverhead, New York	August 2
8	New England Dodge Dealers 150	Stafford Motor Speedway, Stafford, Connecticut	August 8
9	New England Dodge Dealers 150	Thompson Speedway Motorsports Park, Thompson, Connecticut	August 14
10	Whelen 150	Mansfield Motorsports Park, Mansfield, Ohio	August 23
11	Sunoco Modified Mania 150	Thompson Speedway Motorsports Park, Thompson, Connecticut	September 7
12	New Hampshire 100	New Hampshire Motor Speedway, Loudon, New Hampshire	September 13
13	Made In America Whelen 300 (Note: The Made In America Whelen 300 was held as a combined event, with competitors from the Whelen Modified Tour competing along with competitors for the Whelen Southern Modified Tour. The race was run with a series-based point distribution, where drivers received points and statistical credit for their finish relative to other drivers in their series, not to the whole field in general.)	Martinsville Speedway, Martinsville, Virginia	September 20
14	Chemung 120	Chemung Speedrome, Chemung, New York	October 5
15	CarQuest Fall Final	Stafford Motor Speedway, Stafford, Connecticut	October 12
16	Xtra Mart World Series	Thompson Speedway Motorsports Park, Thompson, Connecticut	October 19

== Results and standings ==
=== Races ===
No.	Race	Pole position	Most laps led	Winning driver	Manufacturer
1	Icebreaker 150	James Civali	James Civali	Ed Flemke Jr.	Chevrolet
2	Spring Sizzler	Ryan Preece	Ted Christopher	Ted Christopher	Chevrolet
3	TSI Harley-Davidson 150	Chuck Hossfeld	Chuck Hossfeld	Chuck Hossfeld	Dodge
4	New England Dodge Dealers 75	Bobby Grigas III	Ted Christopher	Ron Silk	Pontiac
5	New England 100	Chuck Hossfeld	Ted Christopher	Chuck Hossfeld	Dodge
6	Mason Farms 100	Jan Leaty	Matt Hirschman	Matt Hirschman	Chevrolet
7	Miller Lite 140	Bill Park	Jimmy Blewett	Jimmy Blewett	Chevrolet
8	New England Dodge Dealers 150	Eric Beers	Ryan Preece	Jimmy Blewett	Chevrolet
9	New England Dodge Dealers 150	Chuck Hossfeld	Todd Szegedy	Ron Silk	Pontiac
10	Whelen 150	Eric Beers	Ted Christopher	Ted Christopher	Chevrolet
11	Sunoco Modified Mania 150	Ted Christopher	Ted Christopher	Todd Szegedy	Ford
12	New Hampshire 100	Ryan Newman	Jimmy Blewett	Ted Christopher	Chevrolet
13	Made In America Whelen 300	Ryan Preece	Ryan Preece	Ryan Preece	Chevrolet
14	Chemung 120	Matt Hirschman	Matt Hirschman	Matt Hirschman	Chevrolet
15	CarQuest Fall Final	Mike Stefanik	Mike Stefanik	Mike Stefanik	Pontiac
16	Xtra Mart World Series	Eric Beers	Ron Silk	Ted Christopher	Chevrolet

=== Drivers' championship ===
(key) Bold - Pole position awarded by time. Italics - Pole position set by final practice results or rainout. * – Most laps led.

Pos	Driver	THO	STA	STA	THO	NHA	SPE	RIV	STA	THO	MFD	THO	NHA	MAR	CHE	STA	THO	Points
1	Ted Christopher	10	1*	3	2*	2*	19	4	28	4	1**	14*	1	4	7	6	1	2441
2	Matt Hirschman	16	14	10	7	12	1*	16	4	2	6	9	6	2	**1****	2	25	2314
3	Todd Szegedy	7	9	2	6	7	7	14	16	20*	23	1	13	5	2	4	8	2260
4	Chuck Hossfeld	2	3	**1***	4	1	3	17	15	16	28	15	29	19	4	3	2	2251
5	Ron Silk	21	28	25	1	10	2	2	27	1	5	2	19	24	5	15	3*	2158
6	Eric Beers	28	2	5	14	4	17	10	**5**	32	**4**	10	10	14	16	5	**10**	2115
7	Mike Stefanik	33	4	4	3	26	5	7	7	5	8	22	27	23	3	**1***	24	2102
8	Rowan Pennink	9	6	11	19	16	12	21	25	7	13	8	22	8	9	7	12	2016
9	Jimmy Blewett	12	23	31	29	13	4	1*	1	25	2	26	2*	25	21	13	15	1969
10	Ryan Preece	19	**29**	7	10	8	25	5	18*	24	3	27	3	**1***	18	28	14	1948
11	Ed Flemke Jr.	1	27	6	26	3	16	19	2	26	24	30	16	7	13	11	23	1911
12	Kevin Goodale	25	11	16	9	17	27	13	6	33	9	11	30	17	11	10	16	1847
13	Glenn Tyler	14	10	24	25	22	13	9	12	27	20	28	14	15	17	9	11	1812
14	Ken Heagy	15	12	18	15	31	18	6	21	17	16	18	12	29	14	22	13	1800
15	Danny Sammons	34	16	19	34	23	9	DNQ	8	8	18	12	5	22	23	16	29	1723
16	Jamie Tomaino	38	8	13	35	21	21	28	22	9	15	32	9	10	12	26	6	1710
17	Bobby Grigas III	3	30	15	**21**	36	10	26	23	10	22	13	18	26	8	18	31	1709
18	Glen Reen	27	13	20	23	35	6	12	24	6	10	25	35	34	24	20	22	1635
19	Joe Hartmann	4	31	22	24	24	14	18	19	29	17	17	31	18	15	24	DNQ	1591
20	Wade Cole	22	21	21	16	25	8	20	20	19	27	19	33	27	22	25	DNQ	1543
21	Tom Abele Jr.	5	17	DNQ	18	38	22	DNQ	DNQ	12	25	20	28	21	20	27	20	1520
22	Billy Pauch Jr.	18	22	14	31	20			13	14	11	7	15	31	19	17	DNQ	1506
23	Richard Savary	26	7	23	13	37	23		14	11		29	21	37		32	7	1317
24	Jake Marosz	23	35	DNQ	25	28	15	DNQ	DNQ	22	21	21	17	40	25	33	DNQ	1303
25	Rick Fuller	32	34	30	12	14			11	23	19	5	36	33		14	30	1271
26	Reggie Ruggiero	8	32	28	DNQ	5			DNQ	30		4	25	3		29	DNQ	1173
27	Anthony Sesely	11	15	27	27	30	11	22	30	13			26			8		1136
28	Erick Rudolph	29	24	9			24		17		7		7		6		5	1105
29	Renee Dupuis	17	26	DNQ	11	34			DNQ	28		24	23			23	26	959
30	Woody Pitkat			17						18	12		8	6	10		18	883
31	Bobby Santos III	35			8	6				3		6	38				32	781
32	James Civali	**6***	5	8	28	29	26	27										769
33	Gary McDonald	39		DNQ	DNQ	27		DNQ	DNQ	15		23	24				DNQ	703
34	Rob Summers		33	29		15			31				4			12	27	697
35	Doug Coby					DNQ			3			3	34			21	4	694
36	Charlie Pasteryak	13		12	20				10				37				28	619
37	Eric Berndt	31	18	26	32				29	31		31				31		617
38	Carl Pasteryak	20	25	DNQ	17				9								17	614
39	Tony Ferrante Jr.	30			5			11				16					9	611
40	Andy Seuss				33	18				21	14			30^{1}			21	494
41	Sean Patterson	24	19			33								DNQ				337
42	Eric Goodale													13		19	DNQ	304
43	Frank Ruocco		20	DNQ					DNQ							30		295
44	Tommy Farrell				30			DNQ					11					264
45	Donny Lia							3					32					232
46	Dan Jivanelli							8										142
47	Jeff Fuller					9												138
48	Kenny Horton					DNQ^{2}			26									131
49	Jimmy Storace	37					28											131
50	Brian Loftin					11								9^{1}				130
51	Dion Ciccarelli										29						DNQ^{2}	125
52	Bill Park							**15**										118
53	L. W. Miller					19								12^{1}				106
54	Keith Rocco																19	106
55	Bill Hebing						20											103
56	Ryan Newman												**20**					103
57	Wayne Anderson							23										94
58	Chuck Steuer							24										91
59	Mike Andrews							25										88
60	Jon McKennedy					DNQ^{2}							DNQ^{2}					86
61	Darrel Krentz										26							85
62	Mike Leaty						29											76
63	Buck Catalano						30											73
64	Jeremy Stoltz										30							73
65	Jan Leaty						**31**											70
66	Jamie Tomaino Jr.										31			DNQ				70
67	Dale Quarterley					32												67
68	Justin Bonsignore							DNQ^{2}										64
69	Gregg Shivers																DNQ^{2}	61
70	J. R. Bertuccio	36																55
71	Roy Seidell Jr.				DNQ^{2}													52
72	Ken Bouchard					DNQ^{2}												37
	Bradley Robbins													DNQ				
	Bryan Dauzat													DNQ				
Drivers ineligible for NWMT points, because at the combined event at Martinsville they chose to drive for NWSMT points
	Tim Brown													11				
	George Brunnhoelzl III													16				
	Rich Kuiken Jr.													20				
	Jason Myers													28				
	Jay Foley													32				
	John Smith													35				
	Frank Fleming													36				
	Bobby Hutchens													38				
	Zach Brewer													39				
	Sean Garter													41				
	Buddy Emory													42				
	Scott Rigney													DNQ				
Pos	Driver	THO	STA	STA	THO	NHA	SPE	RIV	STA	THO	MFD	THO	NHA	MAR	CHE	STA	THO	Points

- ^{1} – Scored points towards the Whelen Southern Modified Tour.
- ^{2} – Kenny Horton, Dion Ciccarelli, Jon McKennedy, Justin Bonsignore, Gregg Shivers, Roy Seidell Jr., and Ken Bouchard received championship points, despite the fact that the driver did not qualify for the race.

== See also ==
- 2008 NASCAR Sprint Cup Series
- 2008 NASCAR Nationwide Series
- 2008 NASCAR Craftsman Truck Series
- 2008 NASCAR Camping World East Series
- 2008 NASCAR Camping World West Series
- 2008 ARCA Re/Max Series
- 2008 NASCAR Whelen Southern Modified Tour
- 2008 NASCAR Canadian Tire Series
- 2008 NASCAR Corona Series
