= Bobby Grigas III =

American racing driver

- Nationality: American
- Born: October 6, 1981 (age 45) Marshfield, Massachusetts, U.S.

NASCAR Whelen Modified Tour career
- Debut season: 2006
- Years active: 2006–2010
- Starts: 42
- Championships: 0
- Wins: 0
- Poles: 1
- Best finish: 16th in 2007
- Statistics up to date as of August 30, 2024.

Bobby Grigas III (born October 6, 1981) is an American former professional stock car racing driver who competed in the NASCAR Whelen Modified Tour from 2006 to 2010.

Grigas III has also previously competed in series such as the now defunct NASCAR Whelen Southern Modified Tour, the PASS North Super Late Model Series, the ACT Late Model Tour, the Modified Racing Series, and the World Series of Asphalt Stock Car Racing.

== Motorsports results ==
=== NASCAR ===
(key) (Bold – Pole position awarded by qualifying time. Italics – Pole position earned by points standings or practice time. * – Most laps led.)

==== Whelen Modified Tour ====
NASCAR Whelen Modified Tour results
Year	Team	No.	Make	1	2	3	4	5	6	7	8	9	10	11	12	13	14	15	16	NWMTC	Pts	Ref
2006	Robert Grigas Jr.	09	Chevy	TMP	STA	JEN	TMP	STA	NHA	HOL	RIV	STA	TMP	MAR	TMP	NHA	WFD	TMP; 24	STA	62nd	91	
2007	Robert Grigas Jr.	09	Chevy	TMP; 9	STA; 11	WTO; 29	STA; 19	TMP; 32	NHA; 39		RIV; DNQ	STA; 23	TMP; 29	MAN; 10	MAR; 7	NHA; 10	TMP; 6	STA; 13	TMP; 25	16th	1670	
2007	Boehler Racing Enterprises	3	Chevy							TSA; 23										16th	1670	
2008	Robert Grigas Jr.	09	Chevy	TMP; 3	STA; 30	STA; 15	**TMP**; 21	NHA; 36	SPE; 10	RIV; 26	STA; 23	TMP; 10	MAN; 22	TMP; 13	NHA; 18	MAR; 21	CHE; 8	STA; 18	TMP; 31	17th	1709	
2009	Robert Grigas Jr.	09	Chevy	TMP; 10	STA; 15	STA; 25	NHA; 11	SPE; 11	RIV; 23	STA; 32	BRI; 11	TMP; 8	NHA; 40	MAR	STA	TMP				22nd	1076	
2010	Wayne Darling	52	Chevy	TMP	STA	STA	MAR	NHA	LIM	MND	RIV	STA; 8	TMP	BRI	NHA	STA	TMP			44th	142	

==== Whelen Southern Modified Tour ====
NASCAR Whelen Southern Modified Tour results
Year	Car owner	No.	Make	1	2	3	4	5	6	7	8	9	10	11	12	NSWMTC	Pts	Ref
2007	Bobby Grigas Jr.	09	Chevy	CRW; 14	FAI	GRE	CRW	CRW	BGS	MAR	ACE	CRW	SNM	CRW	CRW	40th	121	
2008	Robert Grigas	09	Chevy	CRW; 5	ACE	CRW	BGS	CRW	LAN	CRW	SNM	MAR	CRW	CRW		33rd	155	
