= Junior Miller (racing driver) =

American racing driver (born 1951)

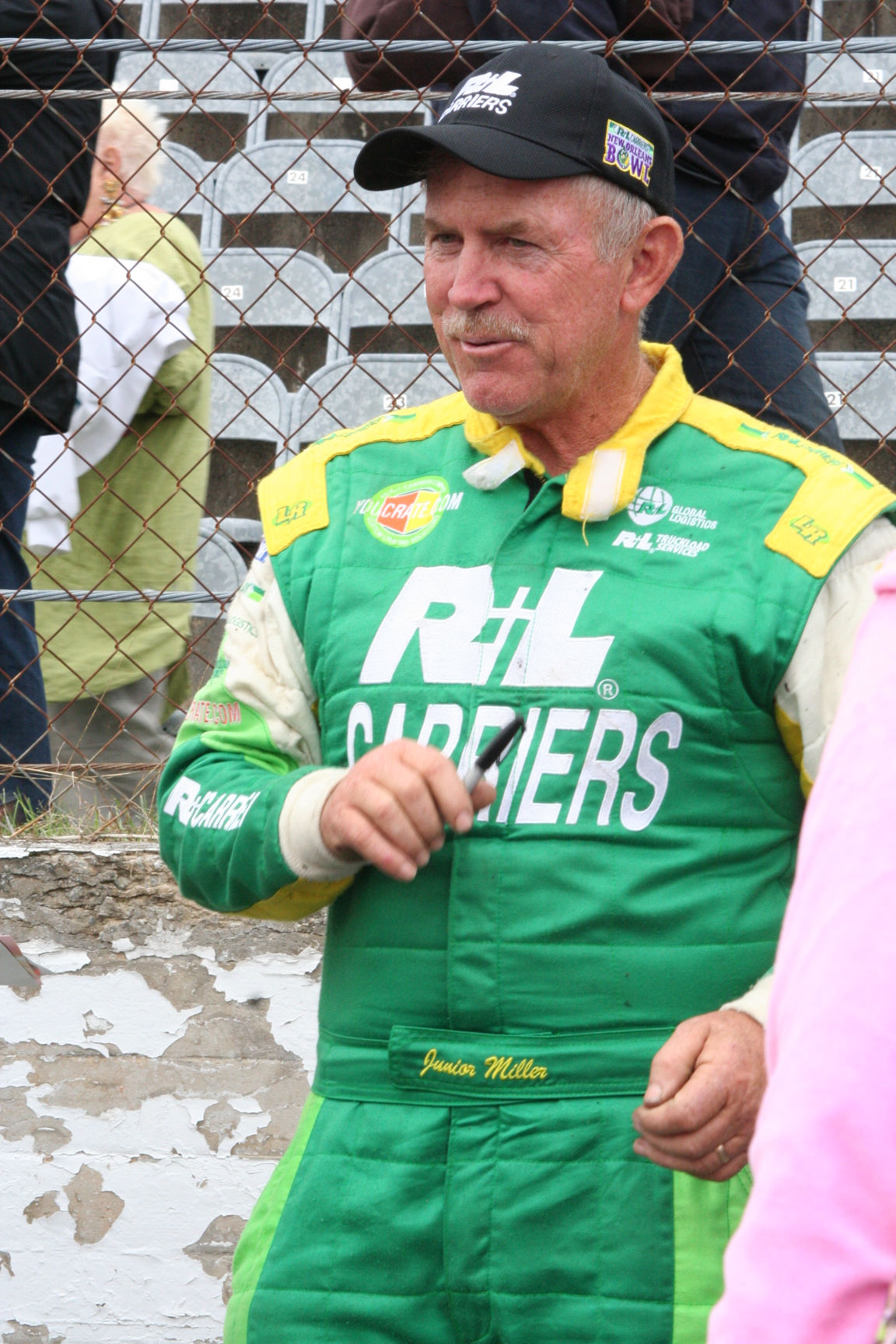
- Miller at North Wilkesboro Speedway in 2010
- Born: April 26, 1951 (age 75); Winston-Salem, North Carolina, U.S.
- Achievements: 1991, 1993, 1995, 1997–2000 SMART Modified Tour champion 2005, 2006 NASCAR Whelen Southern Modified Tour champion 2005, 2006 NASCAR Whelen Southern Modified Tour Most Popular Driver

NASCAR Cup Series career
- 27 races run over 6 years
- Best finish: 31st (1980)
- First race: 1976 Gwyn Staley 400 (North Wilkesboro)
- Last race: 1981 Holly Farms 400 (North Wilkesboro)
Wins	Top tens	Poles
0	0	0

NASCAR O'Reilly Auto Parts Series career
- 11 races run over 2 years
- Best finish: 26th (1983)
- First race: 1983 Coca-Cola 200 (Rockingham)
- Last race: 1983 Cardinal 250 (Martinsville)
Wins	Top tens	Poles
0	1	0

Junior Miller (born April 26, 1951) is an American professional stock car racing driver who has previously competed in the NASCAR Winston Cup Series, the NASCAR Busch Series, the NASCAR Whelen Modified Tour and the NASCAR Whelen Southern Modified Tour.

Miller competed in 27 Winston Cup races between 1976 and 1981, getting a best finish of thirteenth at North Wilkesboro Speedway in 1980, and competed in one NASCAR Budweiser Late Model Sportsman Series season, running eleven races in 1983 with a best finish of eighth at Orange County Speedway. Miller found a majority of his success in the modified ranks, winning the championship in the SMART Modified Tour seven times between 1991 and 2000, and the NASCAR Whelen Southern Modified Tour in 2005 and 2006, thus earning the nickname "King of the Southern Modifieds".

Miller was a frequent competitor at Bowman Gray Stadium, winning 74 races in the Modified division, which as of 2024 is the third most behind Burt Myers (91) and Tim Brown (94).

Miller was inducted into Caraway Speedway's Wall of Fame in 2023.

== Motorsports results ==
=== NASCAR ===
(key) (Bold – Pole position awarded by qualifying time. Italics – Pole position earned by points standings or practice time. * – Most laps led.)

==== Winston Cup Series ====
NASCAR Winston Cup Series results
Year	Team	No.	Make	1	2	3	4	5	6	7	8	9	10	11	12	13	14	15	16	17	18	19	20	21	22	23	24	25	26	27	28	29	30	31	NWCC	Pts	Ref
1976	Junior Miller	95	Chevy	RSD	DAY	CAR	RCH	BRI	ATL	NWS; 14	DAR	MAR	TAL	NSV	DOV	CLT	RSD	MCH	DAY	NSV	POC	TAL	MCH	BRI	DAR	RCH	DOV	MAR	NWS; 15	CLT	CAR	ATL	ONT		67th	239	
1977	Junior Miller	95	Chevy	RSD	DAY	RCH; 17			NWS; 18	DAR	BRI; 24	MAR	TAL	NSV	DOV	CLT	RSD	MCH	DAY	NSV	POC	TAL	MCH	BRI	DAR	RCH	DOV	MAR	NWS; 26	CLT	CAR	ATL	ONT		47th	467	
1977	Junior Miller	45	Chevy				CAR; 31	ATL																											47th	467	
1978	Gordon Racing	24	Chevy	RSD	DAY	RCH	CAR	ATL	BRI	DAR	NWS	MAR	TAL	DOV	CLT	NSV	RSD	MCH	DAY	NSV	POC	TAL	MCH	BRI	DAR	RCH	DOV	MAR	NWS; 15	CLT					72nd	197	
1978	Junior Miller	95	Chevy																												CAR; 28	ATL	ONT		72nd	197	
1979	Junior Miller	95	Chevy	RSD	DAY	CAR	RCH	ATL	NWS	BRI	DAR	MAR	TAL	NSV	DOV	CLT	TWS	RSD	MCH	DAY	NSV	POC	TAL	MCH	BRI	DAR	RCH	DOV	MAR; DNQ	CLT	NWS	CAR	ATL	ONT	N/A	0	
1980	Junior Miller	29	Chevy	RSD	DAY	RCH	CAR; 38	ATL	BRI; 25	DAR	NWS																								31st	1402	
1980	Frank Warren	79	Dodge									MAR; 14	TAL																						31st	1402	
1980	Junior Miller	79	Chevy											NSV; 16											BRI; 27	DAR	RCH; 23	DOV; 29	NWS; 13	MAR; 17	CLT; 26	CAR; 33	ATL; 35	ONT	31st	1402	
1980	Frank Warren	79	Chevy													DOV; 31	CLT	TWS	RSD	MCH; 34	DAY	NSV; 20	POC; 21	TAL	MCH										31st	1402	
1981	Junior Miller	79	Olds	RSD	DAY	RCH	CAR	ATL	BRI	NWS	DAR	MAR	TAL	NSV	DOV; 26	CLT; DNQ	TWS	RSD	MCH	DAY	NSV	POC	TAL	MCH	BRI	DAR	RCH	DOV	MAR	NWS; 20	CLT	CAR	ATL	RSD	68th	188	

==== Busch Series ====
NASCAR Busch Series results
Year	Team	No.	Make	1	2	3	4	5	6	7	8	9	10	11	12	13	14	15	16	17	18	19	20	21	22	23	24	25	26	27	28	29	30	31	32	33	34	35	NBSC	Pts	Ref
1983	Junior Miller	69	Buick	DAY; DNQ	RCH	CAR; 16	HCY	MAR; 13	NWS	SBO	GPS	LGY	DOV	BRI; 21	CLT	SBO	HCY	ROU	SBO	ROU; 8	CRW; 18	ROU	SBO	HCY	LGY	IRP	GPS	BRI	HCY		RCH; 23	NWS	SBO						26th	1205	
1983	Junior Miller	69	Pontiac																											DAR; 15				MAR; 28	ROU; 19	CLT	HCY; 21		26th	1205	
1983	Junior Miller	07	Pontiac																																			MAR; 15	26th	1205	
1994	N/A	?	N/A	DAY	CAR	RCH	ATL	MAR; DNQ	DAR	HCY; DNQ	BRI	ROU	NHA	NZH	CLT	DOV	MYB	GLN	MLW	SBO	TAL	HCY	IRP	MCH	BRI	DAR	RCH	DOV	CLT	MAR	CAR								N/A	0	

==== Goody's Dash Series ====
NASCAR Goody's Dash Series results
Year	Team	No.	Make	1	2	3	4	5	6	7	8	9	10	11	12	13	14	15	16	17	18	19	20	21	NGDS	Pts	Ref
1994	N/A	43	Pontiac	DAY	VOL	FLO; 13	SUM	CAR; 2	411; 21	HCY; 11	LAN; 17	BRI; 2			BGS; 17	MYB									15th	1531	
1994	N/A	43	Chevy										SUM; 13	FLO; 16						HCY; 3					15th	1531	
1994	N/A	69	Pontiac														NRV; 22	ASH; 17	VOL						15th	1531	
1995	N/A	69	Chevy	DAY; 32	FLO; 25	LAN	MYB	SUM	HCY	CAR	STH	BRI	SUM	GRE								HOM; 34			36th	463	
1995	N/A	69	Pontiac												BGS; 34	MYB	NSV	FLO	NWS; 9	VOL	HCY				36th	463	
1996	N/A	69	Pontiac	DAY; 20		MYB; 7	SUM; 6	NSV; 23	TRI; 8	CAR; 18	HCY; 12	FLO; 21	BRI; 6	SUM	GRE	SNM	BGS; 11	MYB	LAN	STH	FLO	NWS	VOL	HCY	20th	1285	
1996	N/A	69	Chevy		HOM; 29																				20th	1285	
1997	N/A	69	Pontiac	DAY; 30	HOM; 7	KIN; 22	MYB	LAN	CAR	TRI; 21			BRI; 11	GRE	SNM	CLT; 28	MYB; 24	LAN	SUM	STA	HCY				28th	922	
1997	N/A	3	N/A								FLO; 15	HCY													28th	922	
1997	N/A	17	Pontiac																			USA; 25	CON	HOM	28th	922	
1998	N/A	69	Pontiac	DAY; 8	MON	STA	JAC	CAR	CLT	SBO	ROU	LOU	SUM	GRE	SNM	MYB	BRI	HCY	JAC	USA	LAN				73rd	142	
1999	N/A	77	Pontiac	DAY; DNQ	HCY	CAR	CLT	BRI; 19	LOU	SUM	GRE	ROU	STA	MYB	HCY	LAN	USA	JAC	LAN						N/A	0	
2000	N/A	78	Mercury	DAY; DNQ	MON	STA	JAC	CAR	CLT	SBO	ROU	LOU	SUM	GRE	SNM	MYB									55th	165	
2000	N/A	77	Mercury														BRI; 29	HCY	JAC	USA	LAN				55th	165	
2002	N/A	77	Toyota	DAY; 16	HAR	ROU	LON	CLT; 32	KEN	MEM	GRE	SNM	SBO	MYB	BRI	MOT	ATL								52nd	182	
2003	N/A	77	Toyota	DAY	OGL	CLT	SBO	GRE	KEN	BRI; 28	ATL														58th	79	

==== Whelen Southern Modified Tour ====
NASCAR Whelen Southern Modified Tour results
Year	Car owner	No.	Make	1	2	3	4	5	6	7	8	9	10	11	12	13	14	NSWMTC	Pts	Ref
2005	David Riggs	69	Dodge	CRW; 4	CRW; 6	CRW; 1	CRW; 13	BGS; 3	MAR; 3	ACE; 9	ACE; 1	**CRW**; 1	CRW; 2	DUB; 6	ACE; 8			1st	1904	
2006	David Riggs	69	Dodge	CRW; 4	GRE; 1**	CRW; 1	DUB; 5		BGS; 4	MAR; 14			CRW; 11	HCY; 1	DUB; 8	SNM; 1		1st	2098	
2006	David Riggs	69	Chevy					CRW; 1**			CRW; 1	ACE; 6*						1st	2098	
2007	David Riggs	69	Dodge	CRW; 6	FAI; 4	GRE; 1	CRW; 4	CRW; 11	BGS; 3	MAR; 8	ACE; 20	CRW; 3*	SNM; 3	CRW; 10	CRW; 17			4th	1766	
2008	Kim Miller	69	Dodge	CRW; 24	ACE	CRW; 21	BGS; 15	CRW	LAN	CRW	SNM	MAR						23th	569	
2008	Kim Miller	69	Chevy										CRW; 11	CRW; 11				23th	569	
2009	Melvin Swisher	53	Chevy	CON	SBO	CRW	LAN	CRW	BGS	BRI	CRW	MBS	CRW	CRW	MAR	ACE; 14	CRW	39th	121	
