= Jamie Tomaino =

American racing driver (born 1956)

- Born: July 3, 1956 (age 70); Howell Township, New Jersey, U.S.

NASCAR O'Reilly Auto Parts Series career
- 7 races run over 2 years
- Best finish: 111th (1991)
- First race: 1991 NE Chevy 250 (New Hampshire)
Wins	Top tens	Poles
0	0	0

ARCA Menards Series East career
- 3 races run over 1 year
- Best finish: 45th (1991)
- First race: 1991 ADAP/Auto Palace NASCAR Doubleheader (New Hampshire)
- Last race: 1991 Chevy Dealers of New England 250 (New Hampshire)
Wins	Top tens	Poles
0	0	0
- Statistics up to date as of July 22, 2024.

Jamie Tomaino (born July 3, 1956) is an American professional stock car racing driver who has previously competed in the NASCAR Whelen Modified Tour, NASCAR Busch Series, and NASCAR Busch North Series. He has also competed in the now defunct NASCAR Whelen Southern Modified Tour, the SMART Modified Tour and the World Series of Asphalt Stock Car Racing.

Nicknamed The Jet, Tomaino is a long-time competitor in the Modified Tour, having competed in the series since its first season 1985, where he won the championship in 1990, as well as winning three races and five pole positions.

== Motorsports results ==
=== NASCAR ===
(key) (Bold – Pole position awarded by qualifying time. Italics – Pole position earned by points standings or practice time. * – Most laps led.)

==== Busch Series ====
NASCAR Busch Series results
Year	Team	No.	Make	1	2	3	4	5	6	7	8	9	10	11	12	13	14	15	16	17	18	19	20	21	22	23	24	25	26	27	28	29	30	31	NBSC	Pts	Ref
1991	Ling Racing	88	Pontiac	DAY	RCH	CAR	MAR	VOL	HCY	DAR	BRI	LAN	SBO	NZH	CLT	DOV	ROU	HCY	MYB	GLN	OXF	NHA	SBO	DUB	IRP	ROU	BRI	DAR	RCH	DOV	CLT	NHA; 41	CAR	MAR	111th	40	

==== Busch North Series ====
NASCAR Busch North Series results
Year	Team	No.	Make	1	2	3	4	5	6	7	8	9	10	11	12	13	14	15	16	17	18	19	20	21	22	23	24	NBNSC	Pts	Ref
1991	Ling Racing	6	Pontiac	DAY	RCH	CAR	NHA	OXF	NZH	MND	OXF	TMP	HOL	JEN	EPP	STA	OXF	NHA	FLE	OXF	TMP	NHA; 14	RPS	TMP; 13	DOV	EPP		45th	279	
1991	Ling Racing	88	Pontiac																								NHA; 41	45th	279	
1996	Rita Brunell	17	Chevy	DAY	LEE	JEN	NZH	HOL	NHA	TIO	BEE	TMP	NZH	NHA	STA	GLN	EPP	RPS	LEE	NHA	NHA; DNQ	BEE	TMP	LRP				N/A	0	

==== Whelen Modified Tour ====
NASCAR Whelen Modified Tour results
Year	Team	No.	Make	1	2	3	4	5	6	7	8	9	10	11	12	13	14	15	16	17	18	19	20	21	22	23	24	25	26	27	28	29	NWMTC	Pts	Ref
1985	Bill Potts	99	Chevy	TMP; 4	MAR; 5	STA; DNQ	MAR; 24	NEG; 7	WFD; 8	NEG; 20	SPE; 4	RIV; 6	CLA; 7	STA; 15	TMP; 6	NEG; 18	HOL; 4	HOL; 5	RIV; 6	CAT; 6	EPP; 6	TMP; 18	WFD; 2	**RIV**; 4*	STA; 28	TMP; 6	POC; 4	TIO; 20	OXF; 19	STA; 6	TMP; 18	MAR; 8	6th	3675	
1986	Bill Potts	99	Chevy	ROU; 5	MAR; 2*	**STA**; 3*	TMP; 20	MAR; 6	NEG; 2	MND; 3	EPP; 8	NEG; 8	WFD; 8	SPE; 20	RIV; 13	NEG; 3	TMP; 4	RIV; 6	TMP; 3	RIV; 22	STA; 25	TMP; 11	POC; 2	TIO; 3	OXF; 2								2nd	3655	
1986	Bill Potts	99	Pontiac																							STA; 1*	TMP; 4	MAR; 13					2nd	3655	
1987	Bill Potts	99	Chevy	ROU; 23			STA; 3	CNB; 10	STA; 9	MND; 17	WFD; 10		SPE; 5	RIV; 4	TMP; 15	RPS; 5				TMP; 2	RIV; 17	SEE; 14	STA; 13	POC; 25	TIO; 4	TMP; 12	OXF; 16	TMP; 22	ROU; 20	MAR; 2	STA; 29		8th	3512	
1987	Bill Potts	99	Pontiac		MAR; 22	TMP; 28						JEN; 8					EPP; 17	RIV; 12	STA; 12														8th	3512	
1988	Bill Potts	99	Pontiac	ROU; 17	MAR; 17	**TMP**; 30	MAR; 5	JEN; 8																									6th	3142	
1988	Bill Potts	99	Chevy						IRP; 22	MND; 2	OSW; 9	OSW; 3	RIV; 6	**JEN**; 9	RPS; 25	TMP; 9	RIV; 4	OSW; 19															6th	3142	
1988	N/A	3	N/A																TMP; 5	OXF; 4		TMP; 3		TIO; 9	TMP; 31								6th	3142	
1988	Bill Potts	99	N/A																		OSW; 3		POC; 46			ROU; 3	MAR; 5						6th	3142	
1989	Bill Potts	99	Pontiac	MAR; 23	TMP; 6	MAR; 27	JEN; 4	STA; 7	IRP; 21	OSW; 8	WFD; 5	MND; 3	RIV; 8	OSW; 11	JEN; 3	STA; 6	RPS; 11	RIV; 9	OSW; 5	TMP; 26	TMP; 23	RPS; 19	OSW; 7	TMP; 8	POC; 6								5th	3456	
1989	Danny Ust	U2	Pontiac																							STA; 7	TIO; 9	MAR; 14					5th	3456	
1989	Danny Ust	2	Pontiac																										TMP; 13				5th	3456	
1990	Danny Ust	U2	Pontiac	MAR; 3	TMP; 2	RCH; 4	STA; 6	MAR; 5	STA; 10	TMP; 20		HOL; 6	STA; 7	RIV; 15	JEN; 3	EPP; 7	RPS; 14	RIV; 17	TMP; 8	RPS; 15	NHA; 3	TMP; 6		STA; 4	TMP; 6	MAR; 5							1st	3382	
1990	Danny Ust	2	Pontiac								MND; 1																						1st	3382	
1990	Danny Ust	32	Pontiac																				POC; 2										1st	3382	
1991	Danny Ust	2	Pontiac	MAR; 27																													9th	2860	
1991	Danny Ust	42	Pontiac		**RCH**; 22																												9th	2860	
1991	Danny Ust	U2	Pontiac			TMP; 5	NHA; 27	MAR; 27	NZH; 2	STA; 9	TMP; 31	FLE; 12	OXF; 11	RIV; 18	JEN; 7	STA; 27	RPS; 22	RIV; 4	RCH; 25	TMP; 4	NHA; 11	TMP; 6	POC; 3	STA; 2	TMP; 13	MAR; 7							9th	2860	
1992	Danny Ust	U2	Pontiac	MAR; 24	TMP; 19	RCH; 32	STA; 7	MAR; 28	NHA; 30	NZH; 24	STA; 3		FLE; 12	RIV; 21	NHA; 8	STA; 5	RPS; 12	RIV; 20	TMP; 4	TMP; 5	NHA; 37	STA; 8	MAR; 6										17th	2386	
1992	Danny Ust	27	Pontiac									TMP; 27																					17th	2386	
1992	Danny Ust	99	Pontiac																					TMP; 30									17th	2386	
1993	Schwarzenberg Brothers	17	Pontiac	RCH; 10	STA; 6	TMP; 28	NHA; 11	NZH; 3	STA; 11	RIV; 20	NHA; 34	RPS; 15	HOL; 23	LEE; 27	RIV; 25	STA; 8	TMP; 21	TMP; 6	STA; 20	TMP; 5													14th	1984	
1994	Bill Potts	99	Pontiac	NHA; 8	STA; 10	TMP; 27	NZH; 8	STA; 9	LEE; 1	TMP; 3	RIV; 17	TIO; 20	NHA; 36	RPS; 9	HOL; 23	TMP; 29	RIV; 16	NHA; 25	STA; 28	SPE; 27	TMP; 20	NHA; 14	STA; 26	TMP; 15									16th	2352	
1995	Bill Potts	99	Pontiac	TMP; 25	NHA; 31	STA; 8	NZH; 7	STA; 8	LEE; 11	TMP; 14	RIV	BEE; 21	NHA; 14	JEN; 21	RPS	HOL; 4	RIV; 25	NHA; 14	STA; 26	TMP; 4	NHA; 24	STA; 3	TMP; 6	TMP; 31									14th	2378	
1996	Bill Potts	99	Pontiac	TMP; 22	STA; 28	NZH; 14	STA; 21	NHA; 17	JEN; 14	RIV; 18	LEE; 13	RPS; 19	HOL; 6	TMP; 8	RIV; 13	NHA; 8	GLN; 34	STA; 9	NHA; 20	NHA; 7	STA; 12	FLE; 9	TMP; 14										13th	2361	
1997	Bill Potts	99	Chevy	TMP; 6	MAR; 22	STA; 22	NZH; 3	STA; 6	NHA; 13	FLE; 19	JEN; 23	RIV; 7	GLN; 10	**NHA**; 16	RPS; 11	HOL; 7	TMP; 12	RIV; 13	NHA; 34	**GLN**; 20	STA; 27	NHA; 28	STA; 23	FLE; 6	TMP; 4	**RCH**; 16							13th	2749	
1998	Bill Potts	99	Chevy	RPS; 8	TMP; 16	MAR; 5	STA; 26	NZH; 5	STA; 9	GLN; 10	JEN; 10	RIV; 24	NHA; 12	NHA; 12	LEE; 5	HOL; 13	TMP; 28	NHA; 6	RIV; 4	STA; 6	NHA; 31	TMP; 3	STA; 21	TMP; 32	**FLE**; 6								9th	2773	
1999	Bill Potts	99	Chevy	TMP; 4	RPS; 11	STA; 12		STA; 11	RIV; 9	JEN; 22	NHA; 10	NZH; 6	HOL; 4	TMP; 26	NHA; 6	RIV; 17	GLN; 13	STA; 9	RPS; 14	TMP; 5	NHA; 9	STA; 6		TMP; 7									4th	2810	
1999	Bill Potts	99	Pontiac				RCH; 3																MAR; 21										4th	2810	
2000	Bill Potts	99	Chevy	STA; 4	RCH; 15	STA; 9	RIV; 8	SEE; 18	NHA; 13	NZH; 40	TMP; 8	RIV; 13	GLN; 26	TMP; 9	STA; 12	WFD; 11	NHA; 17	STA; 39	MAR; 26	TMP; 33													13th	1887	
2001	Bill Potts	99	Chevy	SBO; 21	TMP; 28	STA; 10	WFD; 6	NZH; 7	STA; 10	RIV; 16	SEE; 13	RCH; 14	NHA; 9	HOL; 12	RIV; 13	CHE; 16	TMP; 23	STA; 9	WFD; 16	TMP; 16	STA; 30	MAR; 18	TMP; 24										13th	2342	
2002	Bill Potts	99	Chevy	TMP; 35	STA; 27	WFD; 8	NZH; 12	RIV; 7	SEE; 9	RCH; 17	STA; 9	BEE; 12	NHA; 16	RIV; 8	TMP; 8	STA; 6	WFD; 30	TMP; 5	NHA; 20	STA; 8	MAR; 4	TMP; 15											10th	2370	
2003	Bill Potts	99	Chevy	TMP; 16	STA; 6	WFD; 15	NZH; 33	STA; 7	LER; 6	BLL; 5	BEE; 20	NHA; 37	ADI; 11	RIV; 5	TMP; 15	STA; 7	WFD; 22	TMP; 7	NHA; 28	STA; 11	TMP; 6												9th	2204	
2004	Bill Potts	99	Ford	TMP; 9		WFD; 9	NZH; 10	STA; 5	RIV; 26	LER; 13	WAL; 15	BEE; 5		SEE; 11	RIV; 6	STA; 5	TMP; 10	WFD; 9		NHA; 18	STA; 8	TMP; 13											6th	2466	
2004	Bill Potts	99	Chevy		STA; 10								NHA; 37						TMP; 7														6th	2466	
2005	Bill Potts	99	Ford	TMP; 27	STA; 7	RIV; 15	WFD; 27	STA; 4	JEN; 5	NHA; 31	BEE; 6	SEE; 21	RIV	STA; 10	TMP; 16	WFD; 8		TMP; 9		STA; 8	TMP; 23												11th	2145	
2005	Bill Potts	99	Chevy														MAR; 6		NHA; 20														11th	2145	
2006	Joseph Venezian	99	Ford	TMP; 8	STA; 19	JEN; 23	TMP; 13	STA; 13	NHA; 25	HOL; 17	RIV; 18	STA; 12	TMP; 29		TMP; 30	NHA; 26	WFD; 12	TMP; 22	STA; 16														16th	1693	
2006	Joseph Venezian	99	Chevy											MAR; 23																			16th	1693	
2007	Cheryl Tomaino	99	Ford	TMP; 28	STA; 10	WTO; 11	STA; 7	TMP; 11	NHA; 23	TSA; 11	RIV; 9	STA; 15	TMP; 7	MAN; 14				STA; 33	TMP; 15														9th	1872	
2007	Cheryl Tomaino	99	Chevy												MAR; 11	NHA; 19	TMP; 25																9th	1872	
2008	Joseph Martinelli	99	Chevy	TMP; 38	STA; 8	STA; 13	TMP; 35	NHA; 21	SPE; 21	RIV; 28	STA; 22	TMP; 9	MAN; 15	TMP; 32	NHA; 9	MAR; 9	CHE; 12	STA; 26	TMP; 6														16th	1710	
2009	Howard Harvey	99	Chevy	TMP; 13	STA; 12	STA; 14	NHA; 26	SPE; 27	RIV; 7	STA; 11	BRI; 13	TMP; 12	NHA; 32	MAR; 8	STA; 21	TMP; 23																	13th	1469	
2010	Trey Tamaino	99	Chevy	TMP; 34	STA; 28	STA; 14	MAR; 33	NHA; 18	LIM; 9	MND; 20	RIV; 8	STA; 28	TMP; 13	BRI; 16	NHA; 32	STA; 28	TMP; 17																19th	1398	
2011	Trey Tamaino	99	Chevy	TMP; 30	STA; 14	STA; 20	MND; 14	TMP; 17	NHA; 18	RIV; 7	STA; 16	NHA; 14	BRI; 13	DEL; 9	TMP; 16	LRP; 14	NHA; 21	STA; 15	TMP; 17														14th	1854	
2012	Trey Tamaino	99	Chevy	TMP; 6	STA; 19	MND; 11	STA; 25	WFD; 16	NHA; 34	STA; 21	TMP; 13	BRI; 10	TMP; 12	RIV; 19	NHA; 15	STA; 16	TMP; 20																16th	379	
2013	Trey Tamaino	99	Chevy	TMP; 17	STA; 12	STA; 17	WFD; 25	RIV; 13	NHA; 10	MND; 22	STA; 17	TMP; 8	BRI; 14	RIV; 13	NHA; 18	STA; 14	TMP; 19																14th	397	
2014	Brittany Tomaino	99	Chevy	TMP; 14	STA; 13	STA; 21	WFD; 11	RIV; 13	NHA; 14	MND; 19	STA; 18	TMP; 13	BRI; 18	NHA; 22	STA; 14	TMP; 13																	15th	369	
2015	Brittany Tomaino	99	Chevy	TMP; 16	STA; 9	WFD; 33	STA; 17	TMP; 22	RIV; 21	NHA; 16	MND; 11	STA; 19	TMP; 20	BRI; 17	RIV; 22	NHA; 14	STA; 8	TMP; 18															14th	397	
2016	Brittany Tomaino	99	Chevy	TMP; 17	STA; 16	WFD; 10	STA; 15	TMP; 26	RIV; 11	NHA; 24	MND; 15	STA; 11	TMP; 18	BRI; 15	RIV; 12	OSW; 16	SEE; 19	NHA; 17	STA; 15	TMP; 11													14th	481	
2017	Cheryl Tomaino	99	Chevy	MYR; 25	TMP	STA	LGY	TMP	RIV	NHA; 18	STA	TMP	BRI	SEE	OSW	RIV	NHA; 22	STA	TMP; 9														39th	102	
2018	Cheryl Tomaino	99	Chevy	MYR; 19	TMP	STA	SEE	TMP	LGY	RIV	NHA; 25	STA	TMP	BRI	OSW	RIV	NHA; 16	STA	TMP														39th	72	
2019	Cheryl Tomaino	99	Chevy	MYR; 29	SBO	TMP	STA																										56th	35	
2019	Cheryl Tomaino	99	Pontiac					WAL; 24	SEE	TMP	RIV	NHA	STA	TMP	OSW	RIV	NHA	STA	TMP														56th	35	
2020	Cheryl Tomaino	99	Pontiac	JEN	WMM	WMM	JEN	MND	TMP	NHA	STA	TMP; Wth																					N/A	0	
2021	Cheryl Tomaino	99	Chevy	MAR; 10	STA	RIV	JEN	OSW	RIV	NHA	NRP	STA	BEE	OSW	RCH; 21	RIV	STA																41st	57	
2022	Cheryl Tomaino	99	Chevy	NSM	RCH	RIV	LEE	JEN	MND	RIV	WAL	NHA	CLM	TMP	LGY; 14	OSW	RIV	TMP	MAR; 13														53rd	61	
2023	Cheryl Tomaino	99	Chevy	NSM	RCH	MON	RIV	LEE	SEE	RIV	WAL	NHA	LMP	THO	LGY	OSW	MON	RIV	NWS; 23	THO	MAR												78th	21	

==== Whelen Southern Modified Tour ====
NASCAR Whelen Southern Modified Tour results
Year	Car owner	No.	Make	1	2	3	4	5	6	7	8	9	10	11	12	13	14	NSWMTC	Pts	Ref
2005	Joseph Venezian	99	Chevy	CRW; 3	CRW	CRW	CRW	BGS	MAR	ACE	ACE	CRW	CRW	DUB	ACE			26th	165	
2006	Joseph Venezian	99	Ford	CRW; 5	GRE	CRW; 8	DUB	CRW	BGS	MAR	CRW	ACE	CRW	HCY	DUB	SNM		28th	447	
2007	Cheryl Tomaino	99	Chevy	CRW; 25	FAI	GRE	CRW	CRW	BGS	MAR	ACE	CRW	SNM	CRW	CRW			44th	88	
2009	Cheryl Tomaino	99	Chevy	CON; 18	SBO	CRW	LAN	CRW	BGS	BRI	CRW	MBS	CRW	CRW	MAR	ACE	CRW	40th	109	

=== SMART Modified Tour ===
SMART Modified Tour results
Year	Car owner	No.	Make	1	2	3	4	5	6	7	8	9	10	11	12	13	SMTC	Pts	Ref
2021	Cheryl Tomaino	99	PSR	CRW	FLO	SBO	FCS	CRW; 15	DIL	CAR	CRW	DOM	PUL; 14	HCY	ACE		30th	33	
2022	Cheryl Tomaino	99	PSR	FLO; 16	SNM; 16	CRW; 14	SBO; 25	FCS	CRW; 21	NWS; 19	NWS; 19	CAR	DOM	HCY	TRI	PUL	25th	63	

Sporting positions
Preceded by Mike Stefanik	NASCAR Winston Modified Tour Champion; 1990	Succeeded by Mike Stefanik
