= L. W. Miller =

American racing driver

Wayne L. W. Miller
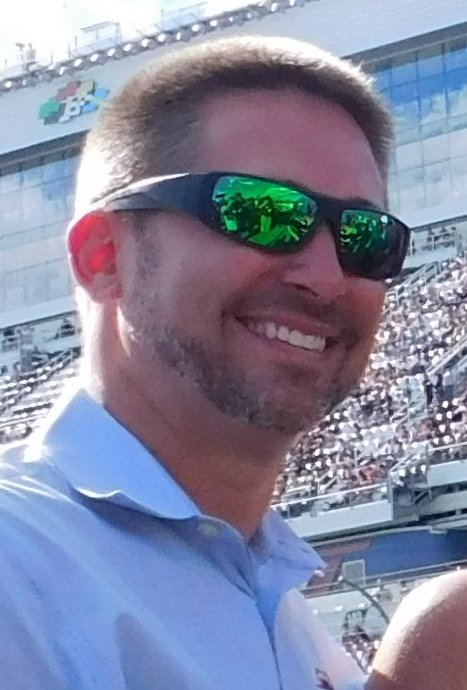
- Miller at Daytona International Speedway in 2017
- Born: L. W. Miller III; July 20, 1973 (age 53); Dushore, Pennsylvania, U.S.
- Achievements: 2003, 2004, 2007 NASCAR Whelen Southern Modified Tour champion

NASCAR O'Reilly Auto Parts Series career
- 13 races run over 3 years
- Best finish: 51st (1995)
- First race: 1995 Goody's 300 (Daytona)
- Last race: 1996 Dura Lube 200 (Darlington)
| Wins | Top tens | Poles |
|---|---|---|
| 0 | 0 | 0 |

NASCAR FedEx Freight Truck Series career
- 6 races run over 4 years
- Best finish: 43rd (2003)
- First race: 2003 Florida Dodge Dealers 250 (Daytona)
- Last race: 2003 O'Reilly 400K (Texas)
| Wins | Top tens | Poles |
|---|---|---|
| 0 | 0 | 0 |
- Statistics up to date as of July 28, 2020.

Wayne L. W. Miller III (born July 20, 1973) is an American professional stock car racing driver. He is a member of the Earnhardt family, as the husband of Kelley Earnhardt Miller. Miller is the 2008 NASCAR Whelen Southern Modified Tour champion and competed in that series full-time from 2006 to 2011 and part-time in 2012. He has also competed part-time in what is now the NASCAR O'Reilly Auto Parts Series, the NASCAR Craftsman Truck Series, what is now the ARCA Menards Series, what is now the ARCA Menards Series East, and the NASCAR Whelen Modified Tour in the past.

== Racing career ==
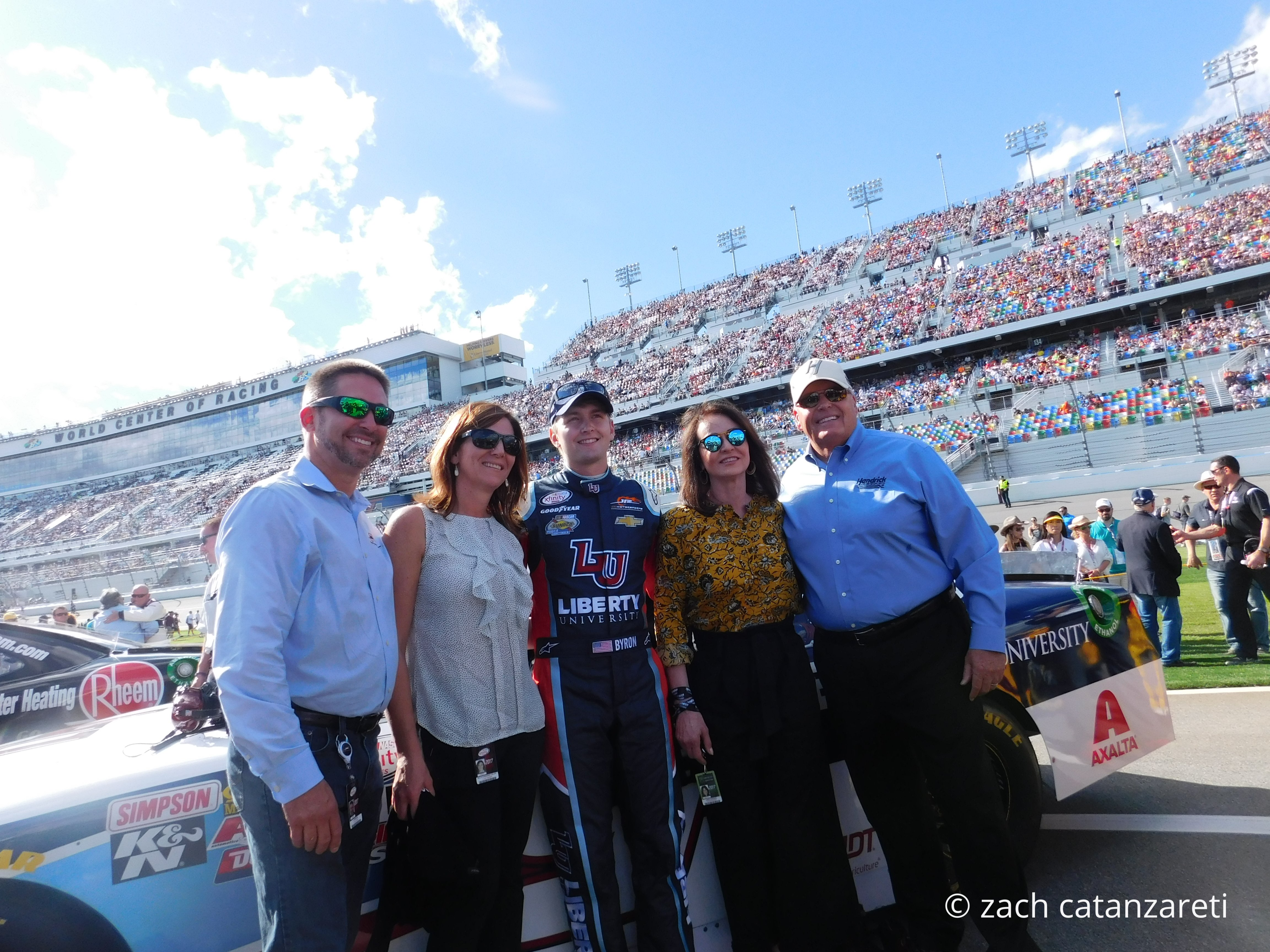
Miller (left) with his wife Kelley, Rick and Linda Hendrick, and William Byron on pit road before the Xfinity Series race at Daytona in February 2017

Miller has 13 NASCAR Busch Series starts. In his first start at Daytona International Speedway, he started 37th and finished 32nd after an oil leak. He also has six NASCAR Craftsman Truck Series starts, all coming in 2003. In his first start, he started 28th and finished 21st after a crash.

== Motorsports career results ==
=== NASCAR ===
(key) (Bold – Pole position awarded by qualifying time. Italics – Pole position earned by points standings or practice time. * – Most laps led.)

==== Busch Series ====
NASCAR Busch Series results
| Year | Team | No. | Make | 1 | 2 | 3 | 4 | 5 | 6 | 7 | 8 | 9 | 10 | 11 | 12 | 13 | 14 | 15 | 16 | 17 | 18 | 19 | 20 | 21 | 22 | 23 | 24 | 25 | 26 | 27 | 28 | 29 | 30 | NBSC | Pts | Ref |
|---|---|---|---|---|---|---|---|---|---|---|---|---|---|---|---|---|---|---|---|---|---|---|---|---|---|---|---|---|---|---|---|---|---|---|---|---|
| 1995 | Group III Racing | 18 | Ford | DAY; 32 | CAR; 42 | RCH; 31 | ATL; 21 | NSV; 27 | DAR; 41 | BRI; DNQ | HCY; 24 | NHA | NZH | CLT | DOV | MYB | GLN | MLW | TAL | SBO | IRP | MCH | BRI | DAR | RCH | DOV | CLT | | | | | | | 51st | 530 | |
| 1995 | L.W. Miller Sr. | 22 | Chevy | | | | | | | | | | | | | | | | | | | | | | | | | CAR; 40 | HOM | | | | | 51st | 530 | |
| 1996 | L.W. Miller Sr. | 21 | Chevy | DAY; DNQ | CAR | RCH | ATL; 16 | NSV | DAR | BRI | HCY | NZH | CLT; 29 | DOV; 41 | SBO | MYB | GLN | MLW | NHA | TAL | IRP | MCH; 36 | BRI | DAR; 39 | RCH | DOV | CLT; DNQ | CAR | HOM | | | | | 58th | 332 | |
| 1997 | Leslie Miller | 39 | Chevy | DAY | CAR | RCH | ATL | LVS | DAR | HCY | TEX | BRI | NSV | TAL | NHA | NZH | CLT | DOV | SBO | GLN | MLW | MYB | GTY | IRP | MCH | BRI | DAR | RCH | DOV | CLT; DNQ | CAL | CAR; DNQ | HOM | N/A | 0 | |

==== Camping World Truck Series ====
NASCAR Camping World Truck Series results
| Year | Team | No. | Make | 1 | 2 | 3 | 4 | 5 | 6 | 7 | 8 | 9 | 10 | 11 | 12 | 13 | 14 | 15 | 16 | 17 | 18 | 19 | 20 | 21 | 22 | 23 | 24 | 25 | NCWTC | Pts | Ref |
|---|---|---|---|---|---|---|---|---|---|---|---|---|---|---|---|---|---|---|---|---|---|---|---|---|---|---|---|---|---|---|---|
| 2002 | FDNY Racing | 28 | Chevy | DAY | DAR | MAR; DNQ | GTY | PPR | DOV | TEX | MEM | MLW | KAN | KEN | NHA | MCH | IRP | NSH | RCH | TEX | SBO | LVS | CAL | PHO | HOM | | | | N/A | 0 | |
| 2003 | FDNY Racing | 28 | Chevy | DAY; 21 | DAR; 16 | MMR | MAR; 27 | CLT; 20 | DOV; 24 | | | | | | | | | | | | | | | | | | | | 43rd | 558 | |
| 2003 | Pro Motion Motorsports | 35 | Ford | | | | | | | TEX; 32 | MEM | MLW | KAN | KEN | GTW | MCH | IRP | NSH | BRI | RCH | NHA | CAL | LVS | SBO | TEX | MAR | PHO | HOM | 43rd | 558 | |
| 2004 | FDNY Racing | 28 | Chevy | DAY; DNQ | ATL; DNQ | MAR | MFD | CLT | DOV | TEX | MEM | MLW | KAN | KEN | GTW | MCH | IRP | NSH | BRI | RCH | NHA | LVS | CAL | TEX | MAR | PHO | DAR | HOM | N/A | 0 | |
| 2010 | FDNY Racing | 28 | Chevy | DAY; DNQ | ATL | MAR | NSH | KAN | DOV | CLT | TEX | MCH | IOW | GTY | IRP | POC | NSH | DAR | BRI | CHI | KEN | NHA | LVS | MAR | TAL | TEX | PHO | HOM | N/A | 0 | |

==== Busch North Series ====
NASCAR Busch North Series results
| Year | Team | No. | Make | 1 | 2 | 3 | 4 | 5 | 6 | 7 | 8 | 9 | 10 | 11 | 12 | 13 | 14 | 15 | 16 | 17 | 18 | 19 | 20 | 21 | 22 | NBNSC | Pts | Ref |
|---|---|---|---|---|---|---|---|---|---|---|---|---|---|---|---|---|---|---|---|---|---|---|---|---|---|---|---|---|
| 1997 | Norm Lavigne | 83 | Ford | DAY | LEE; DNQ | JEN; 28 | NHA | NZH | HOL | NHA | STA | BEE | TMP | NZH | TIO | NHA | STA | THU | GLN | EPP | RPS | BEE | TMP | NHA | LRP | 77th | 141 | |

==== Whelen Modified Tour ====
NASCAR Whelen Modified Tour results
| Year | Team owner | No. | Make | 1 | 2 | 3 | 4 | 5 | 6 | 7 | 8 | 9 | 10 | 11 | 12 | 13 | 14 | 15 | 16 | 17 | 18 | 19 | 20 | 21 | 22 | NWMTC | Pts | Ref |
|---|---|---|---|---|---|---|---|---|---|---|---|---|---|---|---|---|---|---|---|---|---|---|---|---|---|---|---|---|
| 1998 | Info not available | 17 | Chevy | RPS | TMP | MAR | STA | NZH | STA | GLN | JEN; 26 | RIV | | | | | | | | | | | | | | 39th | 471 | |
| 1998 | Info not available | 18 | Chevy | | | | | | | | | | NHA; 28 | NHA | LEE | HOL | TMP | NHA | RIV | | | | | | | 39th | 471 | |
| 1998 | Kim Miller | 73 | Chevy | | | | | | | | | | | | | | | | | STA; 29 | NHA | TMP | STA; 36 | TMP | FLE | 39th | 471 | |
| 1999 | Kim Miller | 73 | Chevy | TMP; DNQ | RPS; DNQ | STA; 25 | RCH; DNQ | STA; DNQ | RIV | JEN; DNQ | NHA; 16 | NZH; 26 | HOL; 25 | TMP; DNQ | NHA; 20 | RIV; DNQ | GLN; 16 | STA; 22 | RPS; DNQ | TMP; 35 | NHA; 27 | STA; 14 | MAR; 28 | TMP; 35 | | 24th | 1514 | |
| 2000 | Kim Miller | 73 | Chevy | STA; 13 | RCH; 21 | STA; 4 | RIV; 11 | SEE; 12 | NHA; 15 | NZH; 27 | TMP; 15 | RIV; 21 | GLN; 23 | TMP; 16 | STA; 25 | WFD; 22 | NHA; 10 | STA; 20 | MAR; 21 | TMP; 22 | | | | | | 14th | 1887 | |
| 2001 | Kim Miller | 73 | Chevy | SBO; 17 | TMP; 13 | STA; 24 | WFD; 20 | NZH; 20 | STA; 9 | RIV; 10 | SEE; 16 | RCH; 17 | NHA; 14 | HOL; 23 | RIV; DNQ | CHE; 13 | TMP; 17 | STA; 12 | WFD; 30 | TMP; 20 | STA; 12 | MAR; 15 | TMP; 14 | | | 14th | 2201 | |
| 2002 | Kim Miller | 73 | Chevy | **TMP**; 6 | STA; 12 | WFD; 15 | NZH; 35 | RIV; 18 | SEE; 19 | RCH; 14 | STA; 21 | BEE; 13 | NHA; 10 | | | | | | | | | | | | | 14th | 2186 | |
| 2002 | Kim Miller | 73 | Pontiac | | | | | | | | | | | RIV; 16 | TMP; 22 | STA; 28 | WFD; 18 | TMP; 3 | NHA; 8 | STA; 27 | MAR; 1* | TMP; 31 | | | | 14th | 2186 | |
| 2003 | Info not available | 73 | Pontiac | TMP | STA | WFD | NZH | STA | LER | WAL | BEE | NHA; 6 | ADI; DNQ | RIV | TMP | STA | WFD | TMP | NHA | STA | TMP | | | | | 55th | 211 | |
| 2008 | Danny Baker | 38 | Pontiac | TMP | STA | STA | TMP | NHA; 19 | SPE | RIV | STA | TMP | MAN | TMP | NHA | MAR | CHE | STA | TMP | | | | | | | 53rd | 106 | |
| 2010 | Danny Baker | 30 | Pontiac | TMP | STA | STA | MAR; 21 | | | | | | | | | | | | | | | | | | | 41st | 191 | |
| 2010 | Roger Hill | 9 | Pontiac | | | | | NHA; 24 | LIM | MON | RIV | STA | TMP | BRI | NHA | STA | TMP | | | | | | | | | 41st | 191 | |

==== Whelen Southern Modified Tour ====
NASCAR Whelen Southern Modified Tour results
| Year | Team | No. | Make | 1 | 2 | 3 | 4 | 5 | 6 | 7 | 8 | 9 | 10 | 11 | 12 | 13 | 14 | NWSMTC | Pts | Ref |
|---|---|---|---|---|---|---|---|---|---|---|---|---|---|---|---|---|---|---|---|---|
| 2006 | Danny Baker | 36 | Pontiac | CRW; 19 | GRE; 3 | | | | | | CRW; 3 | ACE; 8 | CRW; 1 | HCY; 4 | DUB; 1* | **SNM**; 4 | | 3rd | 1924 | |
| 2006 | Danny Baker | 36 | Chevy | | | CRW; 2 | DUB; 1* | CRW | BGS; 2 | | | | | | | | | 3rd | 1924 | |
| 2006 | Danny Baker | 30 | Pontiac | | | | | | | MAR; 7 | | | | | | | | 3rd | 1924 | |
| 2007 | Danny Baker | 36 | Pontiac | CRW; 1* | FAI; 2 | GRE; 24 | CRW; 1 | CRW; 1* | BGS; 10 | MAR; 1 | ACE; 2 | CRW; 1 | SNM; 4 | CRW; 5 | CRW; 6 | | | 1st | 1930 | |
| 2008 | Danny Baker | 36 | Pontiac | CRW; 1* | **ACE**; 1* | CRW; 7 | BGS; 8 | CRW; 7 | LAN; 3 | CRW; 18* | **SNM**; 3* | MAR; 3 | CRW; 6* | CRW; 6 | | | | 3rd | 1698 | |
| 2009 | Danny Baker | 36 | Pontiac | CON; 7 | SBO; 7 | CRW; 15 | LAN; 3 | | BGS; 4 | | CRW; 4 | MBS; 4 | CRW; 16 | | | | | 10th | 1457 | |
| 2009 | Danny Baker | 36 | Toyota | | | | | CRW; 12* | | | | | | | | | | 10th | 1457 | |
| 2009 | Danny Baker | 38 | Pontiac | | | | | | | BRI; 4 | | | | | | | | 10th | 1457 | |
| 2010 | Danny Baker | 36 | Pontiac | ATL; 14 | CRW; 2 | SBO; 2 | CRW; 2* | BGS; 1 | BRI; 9 | CRW; 2 | LGY; 8 | TRI; 8 | CLT; 6 | | | | | 2nd | 1578 | |
| 2011 | Danny Baker | 36 | Chevy | CRW; 4 | HCY; 12 | SBO; 13 | CRW; 18 | CRW; 1* | BGS; 1* | | CRW; 6 | LGY; 9 | THO; 19 | TRI; 7 | CRW; 10 | CLT; 16 | CRW; 10 | 7th | 1984 | |
| 2011 | Danny Baker | 73 | Chevy | | | | | | | BRI; 7 | | | | | | | | 7th | 1984 | |
| 2012 | Danny Baker | 88 | Chevy | CRW; 3 | CRW; 2 | **SBO**; 5 | CRW; 2 | CRW; 19 | BGS; 13 | BRI | LGY | THO | CRW | CLT | | | | 16th | 221 | |

=== ARCA Re/Max Series ===
(key) (Bold – Pole position awarded by qualifying time. Italics – Pole position earned by points standings or practice time. * – Most laps led.)

ARCA Re/Max Series results
| Year | Team | No. | Make | 1 | 2 | 3 | 4 | 5 | 6 | 7 | 8 | 9 | 10 | 11 | 12 | 13 | 14 | 15 | 16 | 17 | 18 | 19 | 20 | 21 | 22 | 23 | 24 | 25 | ARMSC | Pts | Ref |
|---|---|---|---|---|---|---|---|---|---|---|---|---|---|---|---|---|---|---|---|---|---|---|---|---|---|---|---|---|---|---|---|
| 1993 | L.W. Miller Sr. | 70 | Chevy | DAY | FIF; 17 | TWS | TAL | KIL; 16 | CMS; 6 | FRS; 5 | TOL; 7 | POC | MCH | FRS; 24 | POC; 27 | KIL; 5 | ISF; 38 | DSF; 26 | TOL; 9 | SLM; 22 | WIN; 6 | ATL | | | | | | | 12th | 2620 | |
| 1994 | L.W. Miller Sr. | 5 | Chevy | DAY; 19 | TAL; 34 | FIF; 23 | LVL; 22 | KIL; 23 | TOL; 3 | FRS; 15 | MCH; 24 | DMS | POC; 13 | POC; 13 | KIL | FRS | INF | I70; 13 | ISF | DSF | **TOL**; 16 | SLM; 27 | WIN; 20 | ATL; 30 | | | | | 13th | 2620 | |
| 1995 | L.W. Miller Sr. | 38 | Ford | DAY | ATL | TAL | FIF | KIL | FRS | MCH | I80 | MCS | FRS | POC; 11 | POC | KIL | FRS | SBS | LVL | ISF | DSF | SLM | WIN | ATL; 27 | | | | | 83rd | N/A | |
| 1996 | Fast Track Racing | 88 | Ford | DAY | ATL | SLM | TAL | FIF | LVL | CLT | CLT; 39 | KIL | FRS | POC | MCH | FRS | TOL | POC | MCH | INF | SBS | ISF | DSF | KIL | SLM | WIN | CLT | ATL | 165th | N/A | |
| 2003 | KLM Motorsports | 19 | Chevy | DAY | ATL | NSH | SLM | TOL | KEN | CLT | BLN | KAN | MCH | LER | POC | POC | NSH | ISF | WIN | DSF | CHI | SLM | TAL | CLT | SBO; 5 | | | | 118th | 205 | |
| 2004 | KLM Motorsports | 19 | Chevy | DAY | NSH | SLM; 21 | KEN | TOL | CLT | KAN | POC | MCH | SBO | BLN | KEN | GTW | POC | LER | NSH | ISF | TOL | DSF | CHI | SLM | TAL | | | | 144th | 125 | |
