= Chuck Hossfeld =

American racing driver

Charles Hossfeld
- Born: January 4, 1977 (age 49); Ransomville, New York, U.S.

NASCAR FedEx Freight Truck Series career
- 10 races run over 2 years
- Best finish: 32nd (2001)
- First race: 2000 Motorola 200 (California)
- Last race: 2001 O'Reilly 400K (Texas)
| Wins | Top tens | Poles |
|---|---|---|
| 0 | 1 | 0 |

Chuck Hossfeld (born January 4, 1977) is an American race car driver and team owner. He is a former racer in the NASCAR Craftsman Truck Series, NASCAR Whelen Modified Tour, and NASCAR Whelen Southern Modified Tour.

Hossfeld began racing at the age of twelve in kart racing at Lancaster Speedway. Five years later, he began racing stock cars at local short tracks and moved to North Carolina, working for former modified drivers Brett Bodine and Randy LaJoie. After making several starts in the USAR Hooters ProCup Series for LaJoie, he auditioned for the Roush Racing Gong Show and was hired to replace reigning champion Greg Biffle in the No. 50 Ford F-150. He made his Truck debut at the 2000 season finale at California Speedway in the No. 49 Roush Performance Products Ford for Roush, starting 14th and finishing 31st after suffering engine failure.

Hossfeld began his full-time rookie campaign in 2001 without major sponsorship before Eldon came on board, and Hossfeld had a tenth-place run at Pikes Peak International Raceway. Hossfeld was released from the ride a few weeks later, along with rookie teammate Nathan Haseleu, who won the Gong Show competition with Hossfeld.

In 2002, Hossfeld began racing in the Featherlite Modified Series in the No. 4 Dodge for Bob Garbarino. He finished third, second, and seventh, respectively, in the standings over the next three seasons, amassing a total of five wins. He moved to Don Barker's team in 2005, gaining five top-fives and finishing third in the points. He competed in the 40th Annual Stock Car Racing at New Smyrna Speedway, finishing third in the championship. He last raced in the No. 4 asphalt modified for Garbarino in the 2016 Toyota Mod Classic 150 at Oswego Speedway, starting fourteenth and finishing sixth. In total, his Whelen Modified Tour statistics include seven wins, 47 top-fives, eighty top-tens, and nine poles in 140 starts. He also earned three top-fives and five top-tens in nine starts in the NASCAR Whelen Southern Modified Tour.

== Motorsports career results ==
=== NASCAR ===
(key) (Bold - Pole position awarded by qualifying time. Italics - Pole position earned by points standings or practice time. * – Most laps led.)

==== Craftsman Truck Series ====
NASCAR Craftsman Truck Series results
| Year | Team | No. | Make | 1 | 2 | 3 | 4 | 5 | 6 | 7 | 8 | 9 | 10 | 11 | 12 | 13 | 14 | 15 | 16 | 17 | 18 | 19 | 20 | 21 | 22 | 23 | 24 | NCTC | Pts | Ref |
|---|---|---|---|---|---|---|---|---|---|---|---|---|---|---|---|---|---|---|---|---|---|---|---|---|---|---|---|---|---|---|
| 2000 | Roush Racing | 49 | Ford | DAY | HOM | PHO | MMR | MAR | PIR | GTY | MEM | PPR | EVG | TEX | KEN | GLN | MLW | NHA | NZH | MCH | IRP | NSV | CIC | RCH | DOV | TEX | CAL; 31 | 106th | 70 | |
| 2001 | Roush Racing | 50 | Ford | DAY; 19 | HOM; 20 | MMR; 20 | MAR; 18 | GTY; 19 | DAR; 24 | PPR; 10 | DOV; 23 | TEX; 27 | MEM | MLW | KAN | KEN | NHA | IRP | NSH | CIC | NZH | RCH | SBO | TEX | LVS | PHO | CAL | 32nd | 933 | |

==== Whelen Modified Tour ====
NASCAR Whelen Modified Tour results
| Year | Car owner | No. | Make | 1 | 2 | 3 | 4 | 5 | 6 | 7 | 8 | 9 | 10 | 11 | 12 | 13 | 14 | 15 | 16 | 17 | 18 | 19 | 20 | 21 | NWMTC | Pts | Ref |
|---|---|---|---|---|---|---|---|---|---|---|---|---|---|---|---|---|---|---|---|---|---|---|---|---|---|---|---|
| 1999 | N/A | 89 | Chevy | TMP | RPS | STA | RCH | STA | RIV | JEN | NHA | NZH | HOL | TMP | NHA | RIV | GLN | STA | RPS | TMP | NHA | STA | MAR; 30 | TMP | N/A | 0 | |
| 2002 | Robert Garbarino | 4 | Dodge | TMP; 8 | STA; 7 | WFD; 19 | NZH; 8 | RIV; 4 | SEE; 24 | RCH; 5 | STA; 24 | BEE; 20 | NHA; 24 | RIV; 5 | TMP; 3 | STA; 4 | **WFD**; 2 | TMP; 9 | NHA; 1 | STA; 3 | MAR; 29 | TMP; 2 | | | 3rd | 2606 | |
| 2003 | Robert Garbarino | 4 | Dodge | TMP; 1* | STA; 4 | **WFD**; 6 | NZH; 19 | STA; 8 | LER; 4 | BLL; 29 | BEE; 3 | NHA; 1 | **ADI**; 4 | RIV; 6 | TMP; 4 | **STA**; 5 | WFD; 1** | TMP; 23 | NHA; 5 | STA; 3 | TMP; 7 | | | | 2nd | 2684 | |
| 2004 | Robert Garbarino | 4 | Dodge | TMP; 3 | STA; 12* | **WFD**; 12* | NZH; 12 | STA; 28 | RIV; 16 | LER; 9 | WAL; 21 | BEE; 14 | NHA; 24 | SEE; 1* | RIV; 27 | STA; 9 | TMP; 21 | WFD; 6 | TMP; 8 | NHA; 6 | STA; 5 | TMP; 2 | | | 7th | 2457 | |
| 2005 | N/A | 50 | Ford | **TMP**; 3 | STA; 6 | RIV; 12 | WFD; 6 | STA; 2 | JEN; 2 | NHA; 7 | BEE; 23 | SEE; 6 | RIV; 4 | STA; 5 | TMP; 5 | WFD; 20 | **MAR**; 14 | TMP; 6 | NHA; 3 | STA; 3 | TMP; 2 | | | | 3rd | 2666 | |
| 2006 | Hill Enterprises | 79 | Pontiac | TMP; 2 | STA; 15 | JEN; 7 | TMP; 26 | STA; 27 | NHA; 14 | HOL; 12 | RIV; 2 | STA; 19 | TMP; 18 | MAR; 21 | TMP; 16 | NHA; 14 | WFD; 20 | TMP; 31 | STA; 18 | | | | | | 12th | 1852 | |
| 2007 | Hill Enterprises | 79 | Pontiac | TMP; 2 | STA; 13 | WTO; 16 | STA; 31 | TMP | NHA | TSA | RIV | STA | TMP | MAN | MAR | NHA | TMP | STA | | | | | | | 41st | 543 | |
| 2007 | N/A | 18 | N/A | | | | | | | | | | | | | | | | TMP; DNQ | | | | | | 41st | 543 | |
| 2008 | Robert Garbarino | 4 | Dodge | TMP; 2 | STA; 3 | **STA**; 1* | TMP; 4 | NHA; 1 | SPE; 3 | RIV; 17 | STA; 15 | TMP; 16 | MAN; 28 | TMP; 15 | NHA; 29 | MAR; 15 | CHE; 4 | STA; 3 | TMP; 2 | | | | | | 4th | 2251 | |
| 2009 | Chuck Hossfeld | 22 | Chevy | TMP | STA | STA | NHA | SPE; 5 | RIV | STA | BRI | TMP | NHA; 10 | MAR | STA | TMP | | | | | | | | | 38th | 299 | |
| 2010 | Ed Bennett III | 59 | Chevy | TMP; 33 | STA; 6 | STA; 15 | MAR; 25 | NHA; 13 | LIM; 7 | MND; 17 | RIV; 21 | STA; 9 | TMP; 7 | BRI; 10 | NHA; 7 | STA; 18 | TMP; 13 | | | | | | | | 10th | 1704 | |
| 2011 | Ed Bennett III | 59 | Chevy | TMP; 12 | STA; 30 | STA; 7 | MND | TMP | NHA | RIV | STA | NHA | BRI | DEL | TMP | LRP | NHA | | | | | | | | 31st | 585 | |
| 2011 | Chuck Hossfeld | 22 | Chevy | | | | | | | | | | | | | | | STA; 28 | TMP; 4 | | | | | | 31st | 585 | |
| 2013 | Chuck Hossfeld | 72 | Chevy | TMP; 9 | STA; 25 | STA | WFD | RIV | NHA; 8 | MND | STA | TMP | BRI; 9 | RIV | NHA | STA; 8 | TMP; 12 | | | | | | | | 25th | 193 | |
| 2014 | Our Motorsports | 12 | Chevy | TMP | STA | STA | WFD | RIV | NHA; 10 | MND | STA | TMP | BRI | NHA | STA | TMP | | | | | | | | | 40th | 34 | |
| 2016 | Robert Garbarino | 4 | Dodge | TMP | STA | WFD | STA | TMP | RIV | NHA | MND | STA | TMP | BRI | RIV | OSW; 6 | SEE | NHA | STA | TMP | | | | | 43rd | 38 | |
| 2019 | Joseph Bertuccio | 21 | Chevy | MYR | SBO | TMP | STA | WAL | SEE | TMP | RIV | NHA | STA | TMP | OSW; 13 | RIV; 6 | NHA; 4 | STA; 4 | TMP; 20 | | | | | | 30th | 173 | |
| 2020 | Joe Bertuccio Sr. | 2 | Chevy | JEN | WMM | WMM | JEN | MND; 15 | TMP; 17 | NHA; 18 | STA; 8 | TMP; 25 | | | | | | | | | | | | | 24th | 138 | |
| 2021 | Joseph Bertuccio | 2 | Chevy | MAR | STA; 8 | RIV; 6 | JEN; Wth | OSW; 14 | RIV; 24 | NHA; 25 | NRP; 7 | STA; Wth | BEE | OSW; 13 | RCH | RIV; 13 | STA | | | | | | | | 19th | 242 | |
| 2022 | Joe Bertuccio Sr. | 2 | Chevy | NSM | RCH; 3 | RIV | LEE | JEN | MND | RIV | WAL | NHA | CLM | TMP | LGY | OSW; 2 | RIV | TMP | MAR; 18 | | | | | | 35th | 110 | |
| 2023 | Joe Stearns | 14 | Chevy | NSM | RCH | MON | RIV | LEE | SEE | RIV | WAL | NHA | LMP; 5 | THO | LGY | OSW | MON | RIV | NWS | THO | MAR | | | | 63rd | 39 | |

==== Whelen Southern Modified Tour ====
NASCAR Whelen Southern Modified Tour results
| Year | Car owner | No. | Make | 1 | 2 | 3 | 4 | 5 | 6 | 7 | 8 | 9 | 10 | 11 | 12 | 13 | NSWMTC | Pts | Ref |
|---|---|---|---|---|---|---|---|---|---|---|---|---|---|---|---|---|---|---|---|
| 2006 | Roger Hill | 19 | Pontiac | CRW; 2 | GRE | CRW; 25 | DUB; 11 | CRW; 3 | BGS | MAR | CRW | ACE | CRW | HCY | DUB | | 21st | 708 | |
| 2006 | Roger Hill | 79 | Ford | | | | | | | | | | | | | SNM; 5 | 21st | 708 | |
| 2007 | Roger Hill | 19 | Pontiac | CRW; 24 | | | | | | | | | | | | | 28th | 371 | |
| 2007 | Roger Hill | 79 | Pontiac | | FAI; 9 | | | | | | | | | | | | 28th | 371 | |
| 2007 | Roger Hill | 79 | Chevy | | | GRE; 8 | CRW | CRW | BGS | MAR | ACE | CRW | SNM | CRW | CRW | | 28th | 371 | |
| 2012 | Roger Hill | 79 | Pontiac | CRW | CRW | SBO; 14 | CRW | CRW | BGS | BRI | LGY | THO | CRW | CLT | | | 41st | 30 | |

=== SMART Modified Tour ===
SMART Modified Tour results
| Year | Car owner | No. | Make | 1 | 2 | 3 | 4 | 5 | 6 | 7 | 8 | 9 | 10 | 11 | 12 | SMTC | Pts | Ref |
|---|---|---|---|---|---|---|---|---|---|---|---|---|---|---|---|---|---|---|
| 2021 | N/A | 17 | N/A | CRW; 4 | FLO | **SBO**; 2 | FCS; 11 | CRW | DIL; 9 | CAR | CRW | DOM | PUL | HCY | ACE | 17th | 100 | |
