= Tommy Neal =

American racing driver

- Nationality: American
- Born: Walkertown, North Carolina, U.S.

NASCAR Whelen Southern Modified Tour career
- Debut season: 2009
- Years active: 2009
- Starts: 7
- Championships: 0
- Wins: 0
- Poles: 0
- Best finish: 14th in 2009
- Statistics up to date as of September 25, 2026.

Tommy "Tiger" Neal (birth date unknown) is an American professional stock car racing driver who competed in the now defunct NASCAR Whelen Southern Modified Tour and the SMART Modified Tour. He is the grandson of fellow racing driver Riley Neal.

Neal has previously competed in series such as the CARS Pro Late Model Tour, the Carolina Pro Late Model Series, the World Series of Asphalt Stock Car Racing, and the NASCAR Local Racing Series, and a regular competitor at Bowman Gray Stadium.

== Motorsports results ==
=== NASCAR ===
(key) (Bold – Pole position awarded by qualifying time. Italics – Pole position earned by points standings or practice time. * – Most laps led.)

==== Whelen Southern Modified Tour ====
NASCAR Whelen Southern Modified Tour results
Year	Car owner	No.	Make	1	2	3	4	5	6	7	8	9	10	11	12	13	14	NWSMTC	Pts	Ref
2009	T. J. Hunter	21	Chevy	CON	SBO	CRW	LAN	CRW	BGS; 15	BRI	CRW; 15	MBS; 10	CRW; 11	CRW; 14	MAR; 16	ACE; 11	CRW	14th	866	

=== CARS Pro Late Model Tour ===
(key)

CARS Pro Late Model Tour results
Year	Team	No.	Make	1	2	3	4	5	6	7	8	9	10	11	12	CPLMTC	Pts	Ref
2022	N/A	21	Chevy	CRW; 6	HCY	GPS	FCS	TCM	HCY	ACE	MMS	TCM; 10	ACE	SBO	CRW	21st	50	

=== SMART Modified Tour ===
SMART Modified Tour results
Year	Car owner	No.	Make	1	2	3	4	5	6	7	8	9	10	11	12	13	SMTC	Pts	Ref
2000	N/A	12	N/A	CRW	JAC; 12	AND	CRW	MYB	CRW	ACE	CRW	PUL	CRW	CRW			31st	297	
2004	N/A	21	N/A	CRW; 11	UMP; DNQ	CRW; 13	CRW; 12	UMP; 13	UMP; 13	CRW; 15	MYB; 19	CRW	CRW	PUL; 13	CON	UMP; 23	13th	1153	
2022	N/A	21N	N/A	FLO; 19	SNM		SBO; 15		CRW; 18	NWS	NWS	CAR	DOM	HCY	TRI	PUL	21st	75	
2022	N/A	21	N/A			CRW; 16		FCS; 12									21st	75	
