= Ron Silk =

American racing driver

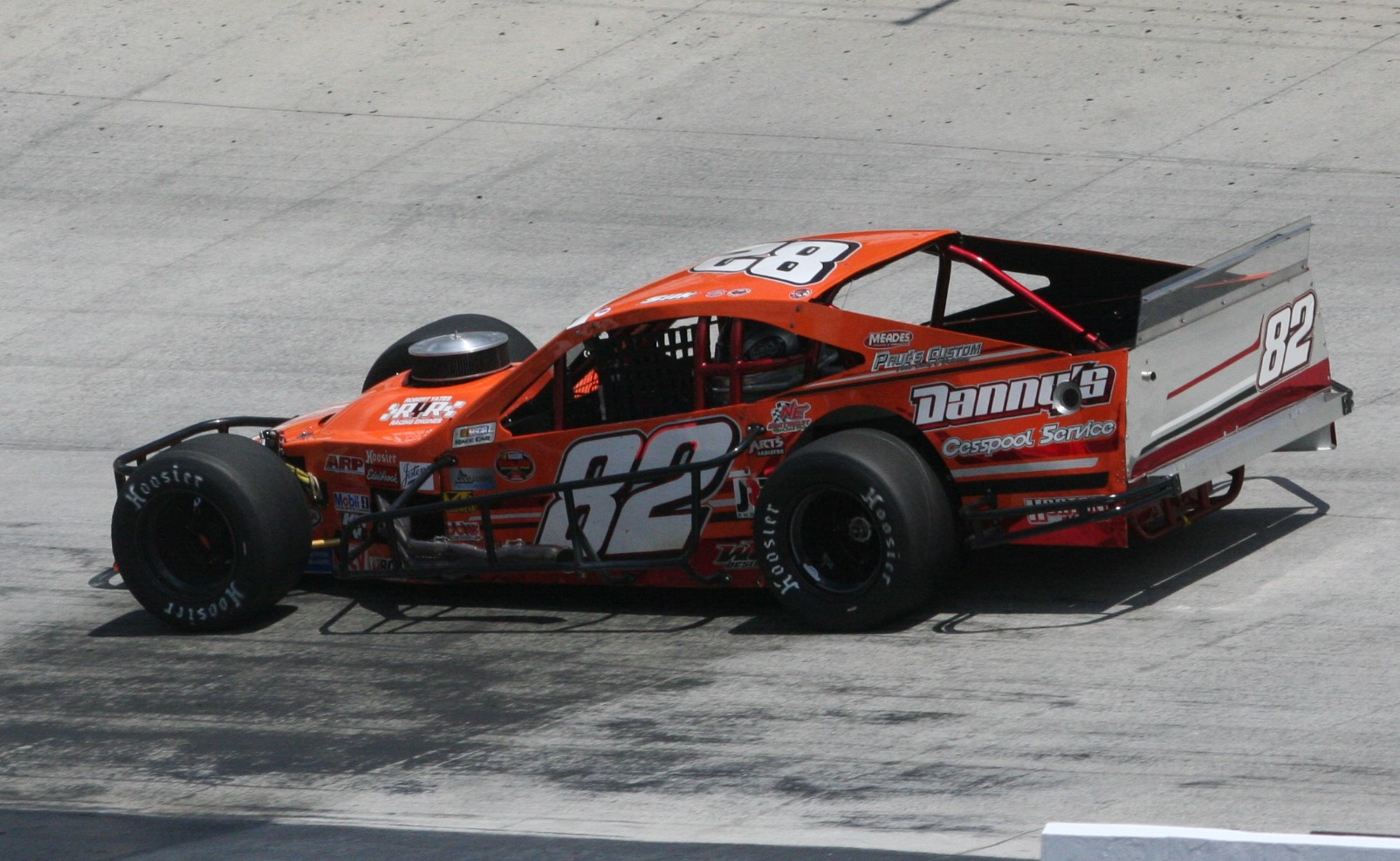
- Silk's No. 82 car at Bristol Motor Speedway in 2016
- Nationality: American
- Born: February 17, 1983 (age 43) Norwalk, Connecticut, U.S.

NASCAR Whelen Modified Tour career
- Debut season: 2003
- Current team: Haydt Yannone Racing
- Years active: 2003–present
- Car number: 16
- Crew chief: Phil Moran
- Starts: 282
- Championships: 2
- Wins: 30
- Poles: 14
- Best finish: 1st in 2011, 2023
- Finished last season: 24th (2026)
- Statistics up to date as of October 12, 2026.

Ron "Ronnie" Silk (born February 17, 1983) is an American professional stock car racing driver who competes part-time in the NASCAR Whelen Modified Tour, driving the No. 16 for Haydt Yannone Racing. Silk is the godson of two-time NASCAR O'Reilly Auto Parts Series champion Randy LaJoie.

Silk is long-time competitor of the series, having made his debut in 2003, and has since won two championships in 2011 and 2023.

Silk got his start in go karts before moving into the SK Modified division at Stafford Motor Speedway, Thompson Speedway Motorsports Park, and the Waterford Speedbowl, winning multiple races at all three tracks driving his family owned 83 car, as well as driving the 85 for Bob Horn.

Silk has also competed in the now defunct NASCAR Whelen Southern Modified Tour, as well as the Modified Racing Series, the Tri-Track Open Modified Series, and the World Series of Asphalt Stock Car Racing.

== Motorsports results ==
=== NASCAR ===
(key) (Bold – Pole position awarded by qualifying time. Italics – Pole position earned by points standings or practice time. * – Most laps led.)

==== Whelen Modified Tour ====
NASCAR Whelen Modified Tour results
Year	Car owner	No.	Make	1	2	3	4	5	6	7	8	9	10	11	12	13	14	15	16	17	18	19	NWMTC	Pts	Ref
2003	Scott Silk	83	Dodge	TMP	STA	WFD	NZH	STA	LER	BLL	BEE	NHA	ADI	RIV	TMP	STA; 27							47th	347	
2003	Scott Silk	83	Chevy														WFD; 24	TMP; 37	NHA; 22	STA; DNQ	TMP		47th	347	
2004	Scott Silk	83	Chevy	TMP	STA; 17	WFD	NZH	STA	RIV	LER	WAL	BEE	NHA; 30	SEE	RIV	STA				NHA; 33	STA; 23	TMP; DNQ	45th	590	
2004	Bear Motorsports	14	Dodge														TMP; 30	WFD; DNQ	TMP; 34				45th	590	
2005	N/A	N/A	N/A	TMP	STA	RIV	WFD	STA	JEN	NHA	BEE	SEE	RIV	STA	TMP	WFD	MAR	TMP	NHA; DNQ	STA	TMP		82nd	43	
2006	George Bierce Jr.	19	Chevy	TMP; 11	STA; DNQ	JEN; DNQ	TMP; 14	STA; 20	NHA; 10	HOL; 26	RIV; 22	STA; 25	TMP; 11	MAR; 20	TMP; 34	NHA; 12	WFD; 22	TMP; 7	STA; 8				19th	1599	
2007	George Bierce Jr.	19	Chevy	TMP; 3	STA; 25	WTO; 7	STA; 21	TMP; 6	NHA; 6	**TSA**; 3	RIV; 3	STA; 20	TMP; 25	MAN; 6	MAR; 12	NHA; 2	TMP; 1	STA; 5	TMP; 5				4th	2257	
2008	Hill Enterprises	79	Pontiac	TMP; 21	STA; 28	STA; 25	TMP; 1	NHA; 10	SPE; 2	RIV; 2	STA; 27	TMP; 1	MAN; 5	TMP; 2	NHA; 19	MAR; 19	CHE; 5	STA; 15	TMP; 3				5th	2158	
2009	Hill Enterprises	79	Pontiac	TMP; 6	STA; 8	STA; 24	NHA; 3	SPE; 9	RIV; 27	STA; 30	BRI; 21	TMP											16th	1419	
2009	TS Haulers Racing	6	Chevy										NHA; 1										16th	1419	
2009	TS Haulers Racing	12	Chevy											**MAR**; 4	STA								16th	1419	
2009	Ronald Berndt	54	Ford													TMP; 9							16th	1419	
2010	TS Haulers Racing	6	Chevy	TMP; 8	STA; 30	**STA**; 13	MAR; 15	NHA; 5	LIM; 3	MND; 3	RIV; 3	STA; 3	TMP; 2	BRI; 13	NHA; 5	STA; 2*	TMP; 5*						4th	2096	
2011	TS Haulers Racing	6	Chevy	TMP; 23	STA; 3	**STA**; 1**	MND; 4	TMP; 2	NHA; 2	RIV; 3	STA; 7	NHA; 11	BRI; 7	DEL; 1	TMP; 9	LRP; 15	**NHA**; 1*	STA; 7	TMP; 16				1st	2443	
2012	TS Haulers Racing	6	Chevy	TMP; 1	STA; 4	MND; 5	STA; 3	WFD; 11	NHA; 2*	STA; 22	TMP; 2	**BRI**; 1	TMP; 18	RIV; 9	NHA; 3	STA; 4	TMP; 11						3rd	533	
2013	TS Haulers Racing	6	Chevy	TMP; 4	STA; 17	STA; 2*	WFD; 9	**RIV**; 20	NHA; 30	MND; 6	STA; 5	TMP; 6	BRI; 10	RIV; 22	NHA; 8	STA; 10	TMP; 5						7th	466	
2014	TS Haulers Racing	6	Chevy	TMP; 7	STA; 10	STA; 6	WFD; 19	RIV; 7	NHA; 9	MND; 9	STA; 2	TMP; 5	BRI; 3	NHA; 11	STA; 3	TMP; 4							4th	483	
2015	Monica Fuller	40	Chevy	TMP; 9	STA	WFD	STA	TMP; 27															28th	199	
2015	Bill Park	20	Chevy						RIV; 27						RIV; 28								28th	199	
2015	Rob Fuller	15	Chevy							NHA; 5	MND	STA	TMP; 27			NHA; 4	STA	TMP					28th	199	
2015	Rob Fuller	05	Chevy											BRI; Wth									28th	199	
2016	Danny Watts Racing	82	Chevy	TMP; 5	STA; 26	WFD; 1*	STA; 7	TMP; 21	RIV; 19	**NHA**; 4	MND; 17	STA; 6	TMP; 7	BRI; 8	RIV; 14	OSW; 9	SEE; 16	NHA; 2	STA; 11	TMP; 18			8th	565	
2017	Danny Watts Racing	82	Chevy	MYR; 12	THO; 13	STA; 8	LGY	THO	RIV														22nd	231	
2017	Brady Bunch Racing	00	Chevy							NHA; 30	STA	THO	BRI	SEE	OSW	RIV							22nd	231	
2017	Robert Katon	85	Chevy														NHA; 7	STA; 3	THO; 3				22nd	231	
2018	Kevin Stuart	85	Chevy	MYR	TMP; 24	STA; 26	SEE; 5	TMP; Wth	LGY	RIV	NHA; 7	STA; 11	TMP; 27	BRI	OSW	RIV	NHA; 10	STA; 5	TMP; 3				24th	279	
2019	Kevin Stuart	85	Chevy	MYR; 25	SBO; 1	TMP; 2	STA; 3	WAL; 8	SEE; 4	TMP; 5	RIV; 4	NHA; 1	STA; 1	TMP; 19	OSW; 3	RIV; 16	NHA; 22	STA; 6	TMP; 2				3rd	599	
2020	Kevin Stuart	85	Chevy	JEN; 6	WMM; 27	WMM; 10	JEN; Wth	MND; 2*	TMP; 1	NHA; 3	STA; 1*	TMP; 3											5th	311	
2021	Kevin Stuart	85	Chevy	MAR; 21	STA; 14	RIV; 7	JEN; 19	OSW; 10	RIV; 4	NHA; 3	NRP; 12	STA; 5	BEE; 1	OSW; 1*	RCH; 19	RIV; 17	STA; 8						3rd	486	
2022	Haydt Yannone Racing	16	Chevy	NSM; 7	RCH; 10	RIV; 3	LEE; 4	JEN; 9	MND; 3*	**RIV**; 3	**WAL**; 5	NHA; 21	CLM; 2	TMP; 12	LGY; 2	OSW; 13	RIV; 3	TMP; 9	MAR; 11				2nd	591	
2023	Haydt Yannone Racing	16	Chevy	NSM; 1	RCH; 7	MON; 3	RIV; 2*	LEE; 5	SEE; 3	RIV; 1*	WAL; 1	NHA; 3	LMP; 3	THO; 2	LGY; 4	OSW; 1	MON; 12	RIV; 3*	NWS; 2	THO; 1	MAR; 6		1st	759	
2024	Haydt Yannone Racing	16	Chevy	NSM; 1*	**RCH**; 2	THO; 1*	MON; 10	RIV; 1*	SEE; 3	NHA; 10	MON; 2	LMP; 10	THO; 7	OSW; 4	RIV; 1	MON; 7	THO; 3	NWS; 11	MAR; 17				2nd	642	
2025	Haydt Yannone Racing	16	Chevy	NSM; 9	THO; 1*	NWS	SEE	RIV; 4	WMM; 13	LMP	MON; 15	MON; 1*	**THO**; 9*	RCH	OSW; 1	NHA; 24	RIV; 2	THO; 1*	MAR				11th	429	
2026	Haydt Yannone Racing	16	Chevy	NSM; 32	MAR; 2	THO; 2	SEE; 21	RIV; 6	OXF; Wth	SEE	CLM	WMM	MON	THO; Wth	NHA	STA	OSW	RIV	THO				24th	158	

==== Whelen Southern Modified Tour ====
NASCAR Whelen Southern Modified Tour results
Year	Car owner	No.	Make	1	2	3	4	5	6	7	8	9	10	11	12	13	14	NSWMTC	Pts	Ref
2008	Hill Enterprises	79	Pontiac	CRW; 6	ACE; 2	CRW; 6	BGS	CRW	LAN; 11	CRW	SNM	MAR	CRW	CRW				21st	600	
2009	Hill Enterprises	79	Pontiac	CON; 10	SBO	CRW; 4	LAN	CRW; 4	BGS	BRI	CRW	MBS	CRW	CRW	MAR	ACE	CRW	20th	454	
2015	Rob Fuller	05	Chevy	CRW	CRW	SBO	LGY	CRW	BGS	BRI; Wth	LGY	SBO	CLT					N/A	0	

=== SMART Modified Tour ===
SMART Modified Tour results
Year	Car owner	No.	Make	1	2	3	4	5	6	7	8	9	10	11	12	13	14	SMTC	Pts	Ref
2025	Haydt Yannone Racing	16	N/A	FLO	AND	SBO; 22	ROU	HCY	FCS	CRW	CPS	CAR	CRW	DOM	FCS	TRI	NWS	52nd	21	
2026	Haydt Yannone Racing	16	N/A	FLO	AND	SBO; 1*	DOM	HCY	WKS	FCR	CRW	PUL	CAR	ROU	TRI	NWS		41st	49	

Sporting positions
Preceded by Bobby Santos III	NASCAR Whelen Modified Tour Champion; 2011	Succeeded by Doug Coby
Preceded by Jon McKennedy	NASCAR Whelen Modified Tour Champion; 2023	Succeeded by Justin Bonsignore
