= Joe Hartmann =

American racing driver

- Nationality: American
- Born: April 26, 1970 (age 56) Calverton, New York, U.S.

NASCAR Whelen Modified Tour career
- Debut season: 1999
- Years active: 1999–2003, 2005–2010
- Starts: 46
- Championships: 0
- Wins: 0
- Poles: 0
- Best finish: 19th in 2008
- Statistics up to date as of September 16, 2024.

Joe Hartmann (born April 26, 1970) is an American former professional stock car racing driver who competed in the NASCAR Whelen Modified Tour from 1999 to 2010.

Hartmann has also previously competed in the Modified Racing Series.

== Motorsports results ==
=== NASCAR ===
(key) (Bold – Pole position awarded by qualifying time. Italics – Pole position earned by points standings or practice time. * – Most laps led.)

==== Whelen Modified Tour ====
NASCAR Whelen Modified Tour results
Year	Team	No.	Make	1	2	3	4	5	6	7	8	9	10	11	12	13	14	15	16	17	18	19	20	21	NWMTC	Pts	Ref
1999	N/A	N/A	N/A	TMP	RPS	STA	RCH	STA	RIV	JEN	NHA	NZH	HOL	TMP; DNQ	NHA	RIV	GLN	STA	RPS	TMP	NHA	STA	MAR; 29	TMP	N/A	0	
2000	Wayne Smith	05	Chevy	STA	RCH	STA	RIV	SEE	NHA	NZH	TMP	RIV; 25	GLN	TMP	STA	WFD	NHA	STA; DNQ	MAR	TMP; DNQ					74th	129	
2001	Wayne Smith	05	Chevy	SBO	TMP	STA	WFD	NZH	STA	RIV; 28	SEE	RCH	NHA	HOL	RIV; 24	CHE	TMP	STA	WFD	TMP	STA	MAR	TMP		73rd	170	
2002	Wayne Smith	05	Chevy	TMP	STA	WFD	NZH	RIV	SEE	RCH	STA	BEE	NHA	RIV; 15	TMP	STA	WFD	TMP	NHA	STA	MAR	TMP			71st	118	
2003	Wayne Smith	05	Chevy	TMP	STA	WFD	NZH	STA	LER	BLL	BEE	NHA	ADI	RIV; 21	TMP	STA	WFD; DNQ	TMP	NHA	STA	TMP				71st	100	
2005	Wayne Smith	05	Chevy	TMP	STA	RIV; DNQ	WFD	STA	JEN	NHA	BEE	SEE	RIV	STA	TMP; DNQ	WFD	MAR	TMP	NHA	STA	TMP; DNQ				N/A	0	
2006	Wayne Smith	05	Chevy	TMP; DNQ	STA; DNQ	JEN; DNQ	TMP; 20	STA; DNQ	NHA; 20	HOL; 28	RIV; 15	STA; DNQ	TMP	MAR	TMP	NHA	WFD	TMP	STA						41st	519	
2007	Wayne Smith	05	Chevy	TMP; DNQ	STA; DNQ	WTO; 12	STA; DNQ	TMP; 26	NHA; 40	TSA; 15	RIV; DNQ	STA; 31	TMP; 18	MAN; 19	MAR; 8	NHA; 18	TMP; 19	STA; 20	TMP; 29						22nd	1396	
2008	Wayne Smith	05	Chevy	TMP; 4	STA; 31	STA; 22	TMP; 24	NHA; 24	SPE; 14	RIV; 18	STA; 19	TMP; 29	MAN; 17	TMP; 17	NHA; 31	MAR; 14	CHE; 15	STA; 24	TMP; DNQ						19th	1591	
2009	Jim Hartmann	05	Chevy	TMP; 20	STA; 27	STA; DNQ	NHA	SPE	RIV	STA	BRI	TMP; 16	NHA; 16	MAR	STA; 28	TMP									33rd	494	
2010	Jim Hartmann	05	Chevy	TMP; 18	STA; 19	STA	MAR	NHA; 33	LIM	MND	RIV	STA	TMP	BRI	NHA; 9	STA; 26	TMP; DNQ								35th	554	
