= Glenn Tyler =

American racing driver

- Nationality: American
- Born: December 24, 1968 (age 57) Hampton Bays, New York, U.S.

NASCAR Whelen Modified Tour career
- Debut season: 1999
- Years active: 1999, 2001, 2006–2011
- Starts: 69
- Championships: 0
- Wins: 0
- Poles: 0
- Best finish: 13th in 2008
- Statistics up to date as of August 27, 2024.

Glenn Tyler (born December 24, 1968) is an American former professional stock car racing driver who competed in the NASCAR Whelen Modified Tour from 1999 to 2011.

Tyler has also previously competed in series such as the PASS North Super Late Model Series, the Tri-Track Open Modified Series, the Granite State Pro Stock Series, the Modified Racing Series, and the World Series of Asphalt Stock Car Racing.

== Motorsports results ==
=== NASCAR ===
(key) (Bold – Pole position awarded by qualifying time. Italics – Pole position earned by points standings or practice time. * – Most laps led.)

==== Whelen Modified Tour ====
NASCAR Whelen Modified Tour results
Year	Team	No.	Make	1	2	3	4	5	6	7	8	9	10	11	12	13	14	15	16	17	18	19	20	21	NWMTC	Pts	Ref
1999	Glenn Tyler	28	Chevy	TMP	RPS	STA	RCH	STA	RIV	JEN	NHA	NZH	HOL	TMP	NHA	RIV	GLN	STA	RPS	TMP; DNQ	NHA	STA; 33	MAR	TMP; DNQ	N/A	0	
2001	N/A	N/A	N/A	SBO	TMP	STA	WFD	NZH	STA	RIV; DNQ	SEE	RCH	NHA	HOL	RIV; DNQ	CHE	TMP	STA	WFD	TMP	STA	MAR	TMP		N/A	0	
2006	Mark Sypher	8	Chevy	TMP; 37	STA; DNQ	JEN; 27	TMP; 24	STA	NHA; 37	HOL; 25	RIV; 23	STA; DNQ	TMP	MAR	TMP; DNQ	NHA; 24	WFD; 29	TMP; DNQ	STA; DNQ						32nd	838	
2007	Mark Sypher	8	Chevy	TMP; DNQ	STA; DNQ	WTO; DNQ	STA; 16	TMP; 21	NHA; 36	TSA; 20	RIV; 24	STA; 24	TMP; 31	MAN; 23	MAR; 27	NHA; 16	TMP	STA; 27	TMP; 18						26th	1272	
2008	Mark Sypher	8	Chevy	TMP; 14	STA; 10	STA; 24	TMP; 25	NHA; 22	SPE; 13	RIV; 9	STA; 12	TMP; 27	MAN; 20	TMP; 28	NHA; 14	MAR; 12	CHE; 17	STA; 9	TMP; 11						13th	1812	
2009	Mark Sypher	8	Chevy	TMP; 28	STA; 17	STA; 18	NHA; 10	SPE; 12	RIV; 14	STA; 12	BRI; 23	TMP; 14	NHA; 27	MAR; 21	STA; 15	TMP; 15									15th	1442	
2010	Mark Sypher	8	Chevy	TMP; 20	STA; 13	STA; 21	MAR; 36	NHA; 16	LIM; 14	MND	RIV; 20	STA; 22	TMP	BRI	NHA; 11	STA; 16	TMP; 29								22nd	1139	
2011	Mark Sypher	8	Chevy	TMP; 14	STA; 15	STA; 13	MND; 23	TMP	NHA; 22	RIV	STA	NHA; 8	BRI	DEL	TMP	LRP	NHA; 15	STA; 16	TMP						28th	929	
