= Jake Marosz =

American racing driver (born 1952)

- Nationality: American
- Born: November 10, 1952 (age 73) Middletown, Connecticut, U.S.

NASCAR Whelen Modified Tour career
- Debut season: 1994
- Years active: 1994–2011
- Starts: 125
- Championships: 0
- Wins: 0
- Poles: 0
- Best finish: 24th in 2008, 2009, 2010
- Statistics up to date as of August 28, 2024.

Jake Marosz (born November 10, 1952) is an American former professional stock car racing driver who currently serves as the crew chief for Melissa Fifield in the NASCAR Whelen Modified Tour.

Marosz is a former competitor of the Modified Tour, having competed in the series from 1994 to 2011.

== Motorsports results ==
=== NASCAR ===
(key) (Bold – Pole position awarded by qualifying time. Italics – Pole position earned by points standings or practice time. * – Most laps led.)

==== Whelen Modified Tour ====
NASCAR Whelen Modified Tour results
| Year | Team | No. | Make | 1 | 2 | 3 | 4 | 5 | 6 | 7 | 8 | 9 | 10 | 11 | 12 | 13 | 14 | 15 | 16 | 17 | 18 | 19 | 20 | 21 | 22 | 23 | NWMTC | Pts | Ref |
|---|---|---|---|---|---|---|---|---|---|---|---|---|---|---|---|---|---|---|---|---|---|---|---|---|---|---|---|---|---|
| 1994 | Linda Rodenbaugh | 9 | Chevy | NHA | STA | TMP | NZH | STA | LEE | TMP | RIV | TIO | NHA | RPS | HOL | TMP | RIV | NHA | STA | SPE | TMP; 31 | NHA | STA | TMP | | | N/A | 0 | |
| 1995 | Linda Rodenbaugh | 9 | Chevy | TMP | NHA; 40 | STA | NZH; 39 | STA; 30 | LEE | TMP | RIV | BEE; 20 | NHA; 37 | JEN; 26 | RPS | HOL; 22 | RIV | NHA; 24 | STA | TMP | NHA; 38 | STA | TMP | TMP | | | 28th | 1284 | |
| 1996 | Linda Rodenbaugh | 9 | Chevy | TMP | STA | NZH | STA; 25 | NHA; 29 | JEN; 28 | RIV | LEE; 25 | RPS | HOL; 24 | TMP | RIV | NHA; 37 | GLN; 13 | STA; 30 | NHA; 32 | NHA; 18 | STA; 26 | FLE; 33 | TMP | | | | 25th | 1394 | |
| 1997 | Linda Rodenbaugh | 9 | Chevy | TMP; DNQ | MAR; DNQ | STA | NZH; 34 | STA | NHA; 37 | FLE | JEN; 15 | RIV | GLN; DNQ | NHA | RPS | HOL; 25 | TMP; 32 | RIV | NHA; 37 | GLN; 25 | STA | NHA | STA | FLE; DNQ | TMP | RCH | 29th | 1195 | |
| 1998 | Linda Rodenbaugh | 9 | Chevy | RPS | TMP | MAR | STA | NZH; 36 | STA | GLN | JEN; 16 | RIV | NHA; 24 | NHA; 31 | LEE; 17 | HOL; 24 | TMP; 18 | NHA; 35 | RIV | STA | NHA; 22 | TMP; 27 | STA | TMP; 21 | FLE; 25 | | 25th | 1435 | |
| 1999 | Linda Rodenbaugh | 9 | Chevy | TMP; 28 | RPS; DNQ | STA; DNQ | RCH; 17 | STA; 23 | RIV; DNQ | JEN; DNQ | NHA; 30 | NZH; 33 | HOL; 26 | TMP; DNQ | NHA; DNQ | RIV; DNQ | GLN; 24 | STA; DNQ | RPS; DNQ | TMP; 28 | NHA; 28 | STA; DNQ | MAR; DNQ | TMP; DNQ | | | 29th | 1122 | |
| 2000 | Linda Rodenbaugh | 9 | Chevy | STA; DNQ | RCH; DNQ | STA; DNQ | RIV; DNQ | SEE; DNQ | NHA; DNQ | NZH; DNQ | TMP; DNQ | RIV; DNQ | GLN; DNQ | TMP; DNQ | STA; DNQ | WFD; DNQ | NHA; DNQ | STA; 23 | MAR; DNQ | TMP; DNQ | | | | | | | 43rd | 530 | |
| 2001 | Linda Rodenbaugh | 9 | Chevy | SBO; DNQ | TMP; DNQ | STA; DNQ | WFD; DNQ | NZH; DNQ | STA; DNQ | RIV; DNQ | SEE; DNQ | RCH; 42 | NHA; DNQ | HOL; DNQ | RIV; DNQ | CHE; DNQ | TMP; DNQ | STA; DNQ | WFD; DNQ | TMP; DNQ | STA; DNQ | MAR; 24 | TMP; DNQ | | | | 34th | 851 | |
| 2002 | Linda Rodenbaugh | 9 | Chevy | TMP; DNQ | STA; DNQ | WFD; DNQ | NZH; 38 | RIV; DNQ | SEE; DNQ | RCH; 32 | STA; DNQ | BEE; DNQ | NHA; 34 | RIV; DNQ | TMP; DNQ | STA; DNQ | WFD; DNQ | TMP; DNQ | NHA; 29 | STA; DNQ | MAR; 19 | TMP; DNQ | | | | | 35th | 850 | |
| 2003 | Linda Rodenbaugh | 9 | Chevy | TMP; DNQ | STA; DNQ | WFD; DNQ | NZH; 28 | STA; DNQ | LER; DNQ | BLL; DNQ | BEE; DNQ | NHA; 34 | ADI; 31 | RIV; DNQ | TMP; DNQ | STA; DNQ | WFD; DNQ | TMP; 30 | NHA; 30 | STA; DNQ | TMP; DNQ | | | | | | 34th | 939 | |
| 2004 | Linda Rodenbaugh | 9 | Chevy | TMP; DNQ | STA; DNQ | WFD; DNQ | NZH; DNQ | STA; DNQ | RIV; DNQ | LER; DNQ | WAL; DNQ | BEE; DNQ | NHA; DNQ | SEE; DNQ | RIV; DNQ | STA; DNQ | TMP; DNQ | WFD; DNQ | TMP; 40 | NHA; 31 | STA; DNQ | TMP; DNQ | | | | | 41st | 709 | |
| 2005 | Linda Rodenbaugh | 9 | Chevy | TMP; DNQ | STA; DNQ | RIV; DNQ | WFD; DNQ | STA; DNQ | JEN; 28 | NHA; 27 | BEE; 22 | SEE; DNQ | RIV; DNQ | STA | TMP; 30 | WFD; 30 | MAR; DNQ | TMP; 25 | NHA; 24 | STA; DNQ | TMP; DNQ | | | | | | 27th | 1122 | |
| 2006 | Linda Rodenbaugh | 9 | Chevy | TMP; DNQ | STA; DNQ | JEN; 26 | TMP; DNQ | STA; DNQ | NHA; 22 | HOL; 20 | RIV; DNQ | STA; DNQ | TMP; DNQ | MAR; DNQ | TMP; 29 | NHA; 35 | WFD; 15 | TMP; DNQ | STA; DNQ | | | | | | | | 31st | 880 | |
| 2007 | Linda Rodenbaugh | 9 | Chevy | TMP; DNQ | STA; DNQ | WTO; DNQ | STA; DNQ | TMP; 27 | NHA; 32 | TSA; 21 | RIV; DNQ | STA; 29 | TMP; 37 | MAN; 26 | MAR; 28 | NHA; 29 | TMP; 32 | STA; 22 | TMP; DNQ | | | | | | | | 28th | 1063 | |
| 2008 | Linda Rodenbaugh | 9 | Chevy | TMP; 23 | STA; 35 | STA; DNQ | TMP; 22 | NHA; 28 | SPE; 15 | RIV; DNQ | STA; DNQ | TMP; 22 | MAN; 21 | TMP; 21 | NHA; 17 | MAR; 28 | CHE; 25 | STA; 33 | TMP; DNQ | | | | | | | | 24th | 1303 | |
| 2009 | Linda Rodenbaugh | 9 | Chevy | TMP; 35 | STA; 25 | STA; 26 | NHA; 27 | SPE | RIV; DNQ | STA; 31 | BRI; 24 | TMP; 23 | NHA; 25 | MAR; 11 | STA; 24 | TMP; 26 | | | | | | | | | | | 24th | 1029 | |
| 2010 | Linda Rodenbaugh | 38 | Chevy | TMP; 32 | STA; DNQ | STA; 31 | MAR; 14 | NHA; 32 | LIM; 15 | MND; 26 | RIV; DNQ | STA; 30 | TMP; 23 | BRI | NHA; 16 | STA; 31 | TMP; 28 | | | | | | | | | | 24th | 1084 | |
| 2011 | Linda Rodenbaugh | 38 | Chevy | TMP | STA | STA | MND | TMP | NHA | RIV; DNQ | STA; 27 | NHA; 26 | BRI | DEL | TMP | LRP | NHA; 29 | STA | TMP | | | | | | | | 36th | 316 | |

==== Whelen Southern Modified Tour ====
NASCAR Whelen Southern Modified Tour results
| Year | Car owner | No. | Make | 1 | 2 | 3 | 4 | 5 | 6 | 7 | 8 | 9 | 10 | 11 | 12 | 13 | NSWMTC | Pts | Ref |
|---|---|---|---|---|---|---|---|---|---|---|---|---|---|---|---|---|---|---|---|
| 2005 | N/A | 9 | N/A | CRW | CRW | CRW | CRW | BGS | MAR; DNQ | ACE | ACE | CRW | CRW | DUB | ACE | | N/A | 0 | |
| 2006 | N/A | 9 | N/A | CRW | GRE | CRW | DUB | CRW | BGS | MAR; DNQ | CRW | ACE | CRW | HCY | DUB | SNM | N/A | 0 | |
