= Spencer Speedway =

Motorsport venue in Williamson, New York

- Location: Williamson, New York
- Coordinates: 43.2274°N 77.2373°W
- Owner: John White
- Operator: Joe Scotnicki
- Opened: 1955
- Former names: Apple Valley Speedway; Williamson International Speedway
- Website: www.rocmodifiedseries.com/spencer-speedway/

Oval
- Surface: Asphalt
- Length: .8 km (.5 miles)
- Turns: 4

Dragway
- Surface: Concrete-asphalt
- Length: .4 km (.25 miles)

Spencer Speedway is a 0.5-mile (0.80 km) flat asphalt oval located in Williamson, New York. The complex also includes a quarter-mile dragway.

== Overview ==
Spencer Speedway was built by brothers Del, Walt and Merle Spencer, and opened in August 1955. The brothers operated the facility until 1993 when it was sold to Todd Hartman and rebranded the Apple Valley Speedway. Due to financial issues, Hartman transferred the property to his brother-in-law, Jeffrey Tome, but by 1996 the Spencer brothers resumed control.

It was purchased by John White in 2005, who also owned the Chemung Speedrome. Since 2018 the facility has been managed by Joe Scotnicki's Race of Champions organization.

The Race of Champions annually offers a six race schedule for modified race cars at the track.

== Major events held at Spencer Speedway ==
NASCAR Whelen All-American Series
NASCAR North Tour (1985)
NASCAR Busch North Series (1987 and 1994)
NASCAR Whelen Modified Tour (1985–1987, 1994, 2008–2009)
ISMA Supermodifieds
Race of Champions Modified Tour (2018-present)
SST Racing Series
NHRA Drag Racing
Super Six Series (NASCAR Sanctioned in 2007) Auto Value Scorpions
