= 2005 NASCAR Whelen Southern Modified Tour =

The 2005 NASCAR Whelen Southern Modified Tour was the inaugural season of the NASCAR Whelen Southern Modified Tour (WSMT) after NASCAR acquired the SMART Modified Tour. It began with the NASCAR Whelen Southern Modified Tour 150 at Caraway Speedway on March 26. It ended with the Whelen 150 at Ace Speedway on October 29. Junior Miller won his first championship in the series, 32 points ahead of series runner up Burt Myers.

== Schedule ==
| No. | Race title | Track | Date |
|---|---|---|---|
| 1 | NASCAR Whelen Southern Modified Tour 150 | Caraway Speedway, Asheboro, North Carolina | March 26 |
| 2 | NASCAR Whelen Southern Modified Tour 150 | Caraway Speedway, Asheboro, North Carolina | April 9 |
| 3 | NASCAR Whelen Southern Modified Tour 150 | Caraway Speedway, Asheboro, North Carolina | April 16 |
| 4 | NASCAR Whelen Southern Modified Tour 150 | Caraway Speedway, Asheboro, North Carolina | July 1 |
| 5 | Advance Auto Parts 199 | Bowman Gray Stadium, Winston-Salem, North Carolina | August 6 |
| 6 | Made In America Whelen 300 (Note: The Made In America Whelen 300 was held as a combined event, with competitors from the Whelen Modified Tour competing along with competitors for the Whelen Modified Tour. The race was run with a series-based point distribution, where drivers received points and statistical credit for their finish relative to other drivers in their series, not to the whole field in general.) | Martinsville Speedway, Martinsville, Virginia | September 3 |
| 7 | DMC Auto Exchange 100 | Ace Speedway, Altamahaw, North Carolina | September 5 |
| 8 | Crown Truck 'N' Stuff 100 | Ace Speedway, Altamahaw, North Carolina | September 5 |
| 9 | NASCAR Whelen Southern Modified Tour 150 | Caraway Speedway, Asheboro, North Carolina | September 10 |
| 10 | NASCAR Whelen Southern Modified Tour 150 | Caraway Speedway, Asheboro, North Carolina | September 24 |
| 11 | Adams Construction / Star Country 150 | Motor Mile Speedway, Radford, Virginia | October 1 |
| 12 | Whelen 150 | Ace Speedway, Altamahaw, North Carolina | October 29 |

== Results and standings ==
=== Races ===
| No. | Race | Pole position | Most laps led | Winning driver | Manufacturer |
|---|---|---|---|---|---|
| 1 | NASCAR Whelen Southern Modified Tour 150 | Burt Myers | Ted Christopher | Ted Christopher | Chevrolet |
| 2 | NASCAR Whelen Southern Modified Tour 150 | Jay Hedgecock | Jay Foley | Burt Myers | Chevrolet |
| 3 | NASCAR Whelen Southern Modified Tour 150 | Jay Hedgecock | Burt Myers | Junior Miller | Dodge |
| 4 | NASCAR Whelen Southern Modified Tour 150 | Jay Hedgecock | Jay Hedgecock | Brian Loftin | Chevrolet |
| 5 | Advance Auto Parts 199 | Burt Myers | Jay Hedgecock | Burt Myers | Chevrolet |
| 6 | Made In America Whelen 300 | Chuck Hossfeld | Ted Christopher | Ted Christopher | Chevrolet |
| 7 | DMC Auto Exchange 100 | Burt Myers | Burt Myers | Burt Myers | Chevrolet |
| 8 | Crown Truck 'N' Stuff 100 | Burt Myers | Burt Myers | Junior Miller | Dodge |
| 9 | NASCAR Whelen Southern Modified Tour 150 | Junior Miller | Michael Clifton | Junior Miller | Dodge |
| 10 | NASCAR Whelen Southern Modified Tour 150 | Jay Hedgecock | Jay Hedgecock | Brian Loftin | Chevrolet |
| 11 | Adams Construction / Star Country 150 | Brian Loftin | Michael Clifton | Brian Loftin | Chevrolet |
| 12 | Whelen 150 | Michael Clifton | Jay Hedgecock | Jay Hedgecock | Dodge |

=== Drivers' championship ===
(key) Bold - Pole position awarded by time. Italics - Pole position set by final practice results or rainout. * – Most laps led.

| Pos | Driver | CRW | CRW | CRW | CRW | BGS | MAR | ACE | ACE | CRW | CRW | SNM | ACE | Points |
|---|---|---|---|---|---|---|---|---|---|---|---|---|---|---|
| 1 | Junior Miller | 4 | 6 | 1 | 13 | 3 | 14 | 9 | 1 | **1** | 2 | 6 | 8 | 1904 |
| 2 | Burt Myers | **14** | 1 | 2* | 11 | **1** | 34 | **1**** | 2* | 3 | 3 | 7 | 9 | 1872 |
| 3 | Brian Loftin | 21 | 17 | 3 | 1 | 16 | 12 | 4 | 4 | 8 | 1 | **1** | 2 | 1844 |
| 4 | Tim Brown | DNQ | 12 | 5 | 2 | 2 | 17 | 8 | 8 | 2 | 12 | 3 | 12 | 1752 |
| 5 | Michael Clifton | 9 | 4 | 9 | 4 | 5 | 41 | 16 | 3 | 4* | 8 | 14* | **3** | 1740 |
| 6 | Jay Hedgecock | 17 | **13** | **4** | **8*** | 4* | 19 | 7 | 14 | 6 | **14*** | 18 | 1** | 1680 |
| 7 | Jay Foley | 2 | 2* | 7 | 17 | 18 | 13 | 13 | 7 | 11 | 7 | 17 | 10 | 1669 |
| 8 | Frank Fleming | 5 | 9 | 11 | 6 | 19 | 33 | 10 | 16 | 10 | 9 | 2 | 5 | 1655 |
| 9 | Brian Pack | 19 | 18 | 17 | 5 | 22 | 39 | 6 | 9 | 7 | 4 | 8 | 7 | 1585 |
| 10 | Bobby Hutchens | 8 | 5 | 8 | 12 | 17 | 31 | 15 | 11 | 12 | 11 | 9 | 13 | 1579 |
| 11 | Gene Pack | 11 | 11 | 13 | 10 | 11 | 25 | 14 | 12 | 9 | 10 | 11 | 11 | 1566 |
| 12 | Jason Myers | 20 | 16 | 12 | 9 | 6 | | 3 | 6 | 5 | 5 | 5 | 6 | 1563 |
| 13 | Alex Hoag | 6 | 14 | 6 | 3 | 21 | 23^{1} | 5 | 5 | 15 | | | | 1260 |
| 14 | Brian Cranmer | 13 | 3 | 18 | 7 | 7 | 43 | | | | 6 | 4 | 14 | 1239 |
| 15 | John Smith | 7 | 7 | 20 | | 14 | | | | | | 10 | 4 | 810 |
| 16 | Kevin Powell | 12 | | | 14 | 9 | DNQ | | | | | 15 | | 619 |
| 17 | Ted Christopher | 1* | | 10 | | | 1*^{1} | 2 | 15 | | | | | 602 |
| 18 | Lee Jeffreys | | | | | 20 | | 12 | 10 | | | 13 | 17 | 600 |
| 19 | Kevin Eckerich | 16 | 15 | 16 | 15 | | | | | 13 | | | | 590 |
| 20 | Danny Wyatt | DNQ | 8 | 14 | 16 | | | | | | | | 16 | 587 |
| 21 | Randy Butner | | | | | 8 | 20 | 11 | 13 | | | | | 546 |
| 22 | Jay Mize | | | | | 13 | | | | 14 | 13 | 12 | | 496 |
| 23 | Rupert Sink Jr. | 10 | | 19 | | 12 | | | | | | | | 367 |
| 24 | Corey Smith | 18 | 10 | 21 | | | | | | | | | | 343 |
| 25 | Daren Scherer | | | 15 | | | 26 | | | | | | | 260 |
| 26 | Jamie Tomaino | 3 | | | | | 6^{1} | | | | | | | 165 |
| 27 | J. R. Bertuccio | 15 | | | | | | | | | | | | 118 |
| 28 | Al Hill | | | | | 15 | | | | | | | | 118 |
| 29 | Joe Lucas | | | | | | | | | | | 16 | | 115 |
| 30 | Brent Elliott | | | | | 10 | | | | | | | | |
| 31 | Jonathan Brown | | | | | | | | | | | | 15 | |
| | Richie Coy | | | | | | 21 | | | | | | | |
| | Jamie Tomaino Jr. | | | | | | 42 | | | | | | | |
Drivers ineligible for NWSMT points, because at the combined event at Martinsville they chose to drive for NWMT points
| | Mike Stefanik | | | | | | 2 | | | | | | | |
| | John Blewett III | | | | | | 3 | | | | | | | |
| | Eric Beers | | | | | | 4 | | | | | | | |
| | Doug Coby | | | | | | 5 | | | | | | | |
| | Tony Hirschman Jr. | | | | | | 7 | | | | | | | |
| | Mike Christopher | | | | | | 8 | | | | | | | |
| | Steve Whitt | | | | | | 9 | | | | | | | |
| | Todd Szegedy | | | | | | 10 | | | | | | | |
| | Jerry Marquis | | | | | | 11 | | | | | | | |
| | Rick Fuller | | | | | | 15 | | | | | | | |
| | Anthony Sesely | | | | | | 16 | | | | | | | |
| | Chuck Hossfeld | | | | | | **18** | | | | | | | |
| | Renee Dupuis | | | | | | 22 | | | | | | | |
| | Zach Sylvester | | | | | | 24 | | | | | | | |
| | Gregg Shivers | | | | | | 27 | | | | | | | |
| | Dave Etheridge | | | | | | 28 | | | | | | | |
| | Donny Lia | | | | | | 29 | | | | | | | |
| | Kevin Konopka | | | | | | 30 | | | | | | | |
| | Ed Flemke Jr. | | | | | | 32 | | | | | | | |
| | Tyler Haydt | | | | | | 35 | | | | | | | |
| | Reggie Ruggiero | | | | | | 36 | | | | | | | |
| | Kevin Goodale | | | | | | 37 | | | | | | | |
| | Danny Knoll | | | | | | 38 | | | | | | | |
| | Wade Cole | | | | | | 40 | | | | | | | |
| | Jake Marosz | | | | | | DNQ | | | | | | | |
| | Jimmy Storace | | | | | | DNQ | | | | | | | |
| Pos | Driver | CRW | CRW | CRW | CRW | BGS | MAR | ACE | ACE | CRW | CRW | SNM | ACE | Points |

- ^{1} – Scored points towards the Whelen Modified Tour.

== See also ==
- 2005 NASCAR Nextel Cup Series
- 2005 NASCAR Busch Series
- 2005 NASCAR Craftsman Truck Series
- 2005 ARCA Re/Max Series
- 2005 NASCAR Whelen Modified Tour
