= Slate Myers =

American racing driver (born 2009 or 2010)

- Nationality: American
- Born: 2009 or 2010 (age 16–17) Walnut Cove, North Carolina, U.S.

SMART Modified Tour career
- Debut season: 2024
- Current team: Gary Myers
- Years active: 2024–present
- Car number: 4
- Starts: 23
- Championships: 0
- Wins: 0
- Poles: 0
- Best finish: 10th in 2025
- Statistics up to date as of September 7, 2026.

Slate Myers (born 2009 or 2010) is an American professional stock car racing driver who competes in the SMART Modified Tour, driving the No. 4 for his grandfather, Gary Myers. He is the son of fellow racing driver and multiple-time Bowman Gray Stadium track champion Burt Myers, and the nephew of fellow racing driver Jason Myers.

Myers has also competed in the Carolina Crate Modified Series and the NASCAR Weekly Series, and is a frequent competitor at Bowman Gray Stadium.

== Motorsports results ==
=== SMART Modified Tour ===
SMART Modified Tour results
Year	Car owner	No.	Make	1	2	3	4	5	6	7	8	9	10	11	12	13	14	SMTC	Pts	Ref
2024	N/A	6	N/A	FLO	CRW	SBO	TRI	ROU	HCY	FCS	CRW	JAC	CAR	CRW; 19	DOM	SBO; 12	NWS	39th	51	
2025	Gary Myers	4	N/A	FLO; 4	AND; 8	SBO; 26	ROU; 17	HCY; 20	FCS; 15	CRW; 23	CPS; 12	CAR; 12	CRW; 12	DOM; 5	FCS; 14	TRI; 13	NWS; 23	10th	370	
2026	Gary Myers	4	N/A	FLO; 7	AND; 20	SBO; 28	DOM; 19	HCY; 10	WKS; 8	FCR; Wth	CRW	PUL						19th	184	
2026	Kim Myers	6/4	N/A										CAR; 11	ROU				19th	184	
2026	Kim Myers	6	N/A												TRI; Wth	NWS		19th	184	
