= Bobby Hutchens =

American racing driver

- Born: April 15, 1960 (age 66) Winston-Salem, North Carolina, U.S.

NASCAR Whelen Modified Tour career
- Years active: 1985–1992, 1999
- Starts: 19
- Championships: 0
- Wins: 0
- Poles: 0
- Best finish: 37th in 1991
- Statistics up to date as of August 10, 2024.

Robert Hutchens Jr. (born April 15, 1960) is an American former professional stock car racing driver, team owner, chew chief, and race engineer. He is the father of Trey Hutchens, who has previously competed part-time in the NASCAR Craftsman Truck Series and whom he served as a crew chief for.

Hutchens is best known for his involvement in the development of the Hutchens device, which was named after him, that was in use in NASCAR from 2001 to 2004. The device was banned by NASCAR in January 2005, due to it failing SFI Foundation safety tests. He was also the general manager for Richard Childress Racing during the time, a position he held since 1989. He was also the senior vice president of competition for Dale Earnhardt Inc. until the end of 2008, where he joined the newly formed Stewart–Haas Racing, where he served as the competition director for the team until his release midway through the 2011 season. He then became the general manager for JTG Daugherty Racing the following year.

During his driving career, Hutchens competed in series such as the NASCAR Whelen Modified Tour, the now defunct NASCAR Whelen Southern Modified Tour, and the SMART Modified Tour.

== Motorsports results ==
=== NASCAR ===
(key) (Bold – Pole position awarded by qualifying time. Italics – Pole position earned by points standings or practice time. * – Most laps led.)

==== Featherlite Modified Tour ====
NASCAR Featherlite Modified Tour results
Year	Team	No.	Make	1	2	3	4	5	6	7	8	9	10	11	12	13	14	15	16	17	18	19	20	21	22	23	24	25	26	27	28	29	NFMTC	Pts	Ref
1985	N/A	15	N/A	TMP	MAR	STA	MAR; 13	NEG	WFD	NEG	SPE	RIV	CLA	STA	TMP	NEG	HOL	HOL	RIV	CAT	EPP	TMP	WFD	RIV	STA	TMP	POC	TIO	OXF	STA	TMP	MAR	N/A	0	
1986	Hutchens Racing	1	Chevy	ROU; 7	MAR	STA	TMP	MAR	NEG	MND	EPP	NEG	WFD	SPE	RIV	NEG	TMP	RIV	TMP	RIV	STA	TMP	POC	TIO	OXF	STA	TMP	MAR					N/A	0	
1987	N/A	16	Chevy	ROU; 9	MAR	TMP	STA	CNB	STA	MND	WFD	JEN	SPE	RIV	TMP	RPS	EPP	RIV	STA	TMP	RIV	SEE	STA	POC	TIO	TMP	OXF	TMP	ROU	MAR	STA		N/A	0	
1988	N/A	15	N/A	ROU; DNQ	MAR	TMP	MAR	JEN	IRP	MND	OSW	OSW	RIV	JEN	RPS	TMP	RIV	OSW	TMP	OXF	OSW	TMP	POC	TIO	TMP	ROU; 12							50th	312	
1988	N/A	5	Chevy																								MAR; 20						50th	312	
1989	N/A	35	Chevy	MAR; 14	TMP																												N/A	0	
1989	N/A	18	Chevy			MAR; 20	JEN	STA																				MAR; 22	TMP				N/A	0	
1989	N/A	5	Chevy						IRP; 17	OSW	WFD	MND	RIV	OSW	JEN	STA	RPS	RIV	OSW	TMP	TMP	RPS	OSW	TMP	POC	STA	TIO						N/A	0	
1990	N/A	16	Chevy	MAR; 29	TMP	RCH	STA																										49th	207	
1990	N/A	5	Chevy					MAR; 24	STA	TMP	MND	HOL	STA	RIV	JEN	EPP	RPS	RIV	TMP	RPS	NHA	TMP	POC	STA	TMP	MAR							49th	207	
1991	Kenneth Hutchens	14	Chevy	MAR; 13	RCH; 14	TMP	NHA	MAR; 20	NZH	STA	TMP	FLE	OXF	RIV	JEN	STA	RPS	RIV	RCH; 13	TMP													37th	524	
1991	Joe Norton	33	Chevy																		NHA; 37	TMP	POC	STA	TMP	MAR							37th	524	
1992	Robert Hutchens	14	Chevy	MAR; 14	TMP	RCH; 12	STA	MAR; 23	NHA	NZH	STA	TMP	FLE	RIV	NHA	STA	RPS	RIV	TMP	TMP	NHA	STA	MAR	TMP									45th	342	
1999	N/A	17	Chevy	TMP	RPS	STA	RCH	STA	RIV	JEN	NHA; DNQ	NZH	HOL	TMP	NHA	RIV	GLN	STA	RPS	TMP	NHA	STA	MAR	TMP									N/A	0	

==== Whelen Southern Modified Tour ====
NASCAR Whelen Southern Modified Tour results
Year	Car owner	No.	Make	1	2	3	4	5	6	7	8	9	10	11	12	13	14	NSWMTC	Pts	Ref
2005	Sharon Hutchens	14	Chevy	CRW; 8	CRW; 5	CRW; 8	CRW; 12	BGS; 17	MAR; 10	ACE; 15	ACE; 11	CRW; 12	CRW; 11	DUB; 9	ACE; 13			10th	1579	
2006	Sharon Hutchens	14	Chevy	CRW; 10	GRE; 5	CRW; 14	DUB; 20	CRW; 6	BGS; 3	MAR; 10	CRW; 11	ACE; 9	CRW; 12	HCY; 5	DUB; 14	SNM; 12		8th	1760	
2007	Sharon Hutchens	14	Chevy	CRW; 19	FAI; 10	GRE; 9	CRW; 7	CRW; 10	BGS; 12	MAR	ACE	CRW	SNM	CRW	CRW			19th	782	
2008	Sharon Hutchens	14	Chevy	CRW; 23	ACE; 18	CRW; 10	BGS; 4	CRW; 16	LAN	CRW; 12	SNM; 11	MAR; 11	CRW; 13	CRW; 18				12th	1232	
2009	Sharon Hutchens	14	Chevy	CON	SBO	CRW; 13	LAN	CRW	BGS; 10	BRI; 5	CRW	MBS	CRW	CRW	MAR	ACE	CRW	21st	413	
