= Brian Pack =

American racing driver

- Nationality: American
- Born: Christopher Brian Pack; April 19, 1974 Walkertown, North Carolina, U.S.
- Died: July 25, 2008 (aged 34)

NASCAR Whelen Southern Modified Tour career
- Debut season: 2005
- Years active: 2005–2008
- Starts: 38
- Championships: 0
- Wins: 0
- Poles: 2
- Best finish: 7th in 2006
- Statistics up to date as of October 25, 2024.

Christopher Brian Pack (born April 19, 1974 – July 25, 2008) was an American professional stock car racing driver who competed in the now defunct NASCAR Whelen Southern Modified Tour from 2005 to 2008.

Pack died on July 25, 2008, following a motorcycle accident.

Pack previously competed in series such as the SMART Modified Tour and the ASA Southern Modified Race Tour.

== Motorsports results ==
=== NASCAR ===
(key) (Bold – Pole position awarded by qualifying time. Italics – Pole position earned by points standings or practice time. * – Most laps led.)

==== Whelen Modified Tour ====
NASCAR Whelen Modified Tour results
Year	Car owner	No.	Make	1	2	3	4	5	6	7	8	9	10	11	12	13	14	15	16	NWMTC	Pts	Ref
2006	N/A	81	Chevy	TMP	STA	JEN	TMP	STA	NHA	HOL	RIV	STA	TMP	MAR; DNQ	TMP	NHA	WFD	TMP	STA	N/A	0	

==== Whelen Southern Modified Tour ====
NASCAR Whelen Southern Modified Tour results
Year	Car owner	No.	Make	1	2	3	4	5	6	7	8	9	10	11	12	13	NWSMTC	Pts	Ref
2005	Julie Pack	81	Pontiac	CRW; 19	CRW; 18	CRW; 17	CRW; 5	BGS; 22		ACE; 6	ACE; 9	CRW; 7	CRW; 4	DUB; 8	ACE; 7		9th	1585	
2005	Julie Pack	81	Chevy						MAR; 13								9th	1585	
2006	Julie Pack	81	Chevy	CRW; 6	GRE; 7	CRW; 20	DUB; 4	CRW; 17	BGS; 21	MAR; DNQ	CRW; 6	ACE; 5	CRW; 8	HCY; 11	DUB; 2	SNM; 8	7th	1778	
2007	Julie Pack	81	Chevy	CRW; 16	FAI; 18	GRE; 2	CRW; 8	CRW; 20	BGS; 5	MAR; 11	ACE; 18	CRW; 7	SNM; 9	CRW; 14	CRW; 5		9th	1593	
2008	Julie Pack	81	Chevy	CRW; DNQ	ACE; 11	CRW; 13	BGS	CRW	LAN	CRW	SNM	MAR	CRW	CRW			27th	333	
