= Carson Loftin =

American racing driver (born 2008)

- Nationality: American
- Born: March 28, 2008 (age 18) Lexington, North Carolina, U.S.

NASCAR Whelen Modified Tour career
- Debut season: 2023
- Current team: Paul Hartwig Jr.
- Years active: 2023–present
- Car number: 73
- Crew chief: Paul Hartwig Jr.
- Starts: 10
- Championships: 0
- Wins: 0
- Poles: 0
- Best finish: 30th in 2024
- Finished last season: 56th (2026)

Awards
- 2025 CARS Late Model Stock Tour Rookie of the Year
- Statistics up to date as of October 12, 2026.

Carson Loftin (born March 28, 2008) is an American professional stock car racing driver who competes part-time in the NASCAR Whelen Modified Tour, driving the No. 73 for Paul Hartwig Jr. He also competes in the CARS Late Model Stock Tour, driving the No. 20 Chevrolet for Mike Darne Racing, having previously driven the No. 22 for Nelson Motorsports, where he won Rookie of the Year honors in 2025.

Loftin is the son of fellow racing driver Brian Loftin, who has also competed in various modified series, having won the NASCAR Whelen Southern Modified Tour championship in 2008.

Loftin has previously competed in series such as the SMART Modified Tour, where he won five races and finished second in the point standings in 2024, the Carolina Crate Modified Series, and the Race of Champions Asphalt Modified Tour.

== Motorsports results ==
=== NASCAR ===
(key) (Bold – Pole position awarded by qualifying time. Italics – Pole position earned by points standings or practice time. * – Most laps led.)

==== Whelen Modified Tour ====
NASCAR Whelen Modified Tour results
Year	Car owner	No.	Make	1	2	3	4	5	6	7	8	9	10	11	12	13	14	15	16	17	18	NWMTC	Pts	Ref
2023	Brain Loftin	23	Chevy	NSM	RCH	MON	RIV	LEE	SEE	RIV	WAL	NHA	LMP	THO	LGY	OSW	MON	RIV	NWS; 25	THO	MAR; 16	56th	47	
2024	Brain Loftin	23	Chevy	NSM; 29	RCH; 9	THO	MON	RIV	SEE	NHA	MON	LMP	THO	OSW	RIV	MON	THO	NWS; 9	MAR; 12			30th	117	
2025	Brain Loftin	23	Chevy	NSM	THO	NWS; 27	SEE	RIV	WMM	LMP	MON	MON	THO	RCH; 21	OSW	NHA	RIV	THO	MAR; 26			49th	58	
2026	Paul Hartwig Jr.	73	N/A	NSM; 20	MAR	THO	SEE	RIV	OXF	SEE	CLM	WMM	MON	THO	NHA	STA	OSW	RIV	THO			56th	24	

=== CARS Late Model Stock Car Tour ===
(key) (Bold – Pole position awarded by qualifying time. Italics – Pole position earned by points standings or practice time. * – Most laps led. ** – All laps led.)

CARS Late Model Stock Car Tour results
Year	Team	No.	Make	1	2	3	4	5	6	7	8	9	10	11	12	13	14	15	CLMSCTC	Pts	Ref
2025	Nelson Motorsports	22	Toyota	AAS; 4	WCS; 23	CDL; 9	OCS; 23	ACE; 12	NWS; 5	LGY; 17	DOM; 24	CRW; 9	HCY; 24	AND; 15	FLC; 7	SBO; 3	TCM; 7	NWS; 10	7th	442	
2026	Nelson Motorsports	22	Toyota	SNM; 5	WCS; 18	NSV; 14	CRW; 23	ACE; 28	LGY; 6										6th	414	
2026	Mike Darne Racing	20	Chevy							DOM; 16	NWS; 9	HCY; 19	**AND**; 1*	FLC; 18	TCM; 2	NPS; 5	SBO; 17		6th	414	

=== SMART Modified Tour ===
SMART Modified Tour results
Year	Car owner	No.	Make	1	2	3	4	5	6	7	8	9	10	11	12	13	14	SMTC	Pts	Ref
2022	N/A	15CL	N/A	FLO	SNM	CRW	SBO	FCS	CRW	NWS	NWS	CAR	DOM; 9	HCY; 14	TRI; 12	PUL		27th	58	
2023	Brian Loftin	23	PSR	FLO; 11	CRW; 16	SBO; 14	HCY; 2	FCS; 8	CRW; 7	ACE; 5	CAR; 7	PUL; 5	TRI; 6	SBO; 2*	ROU; 21			3rd	407	
2024	Brian Loftin	23	PSR	FLO; 1	CRW; 1	SBO; 13	TRI; 4	ROU; 1	HCY; 1	FCS; 1	CRW; 15	JAC; 4	CAR; 5	CRW; 13	DOM; 6	SBO; 16	NWS; 7	2nd	534	
2025	Brian Loftin	23	PSR	FLO	AND; 3	SBO; 5	ROU; 11	HCY	FCS	CRW; 3	CPS	CAR						16th	268	
2025	Grady Jeffreys Jr.	15	N/A										**CRW**; DSQ*	DOM	FCS; 15	TRI; 1*	NWS; 16	16th	268	
2026	Grady Jeffreys Jr.	15	N/A	FLO	AND; 25	**SBO**; 8	DOM; 1*	HCY	WKS	FCR	**CRW**; 1**	PUL	**CAR**; 1*	ROU; 23	**TRI**; 1*	NWS		13th	268	
