= Chip Lain =

American racing driver

- Born: October 5, 1958 (age 68); Kernersville, North Carolina, U.S.

NASCAR O'Reilly Auto Parts Series career
- 19 races run over 2 years
- Best finish: 25th (1983)
- First race: 1982 Mountain Dew 300 (Hickory)
- Last race: 1983 Autumn 150 (Martinsville)
Wins	Top tens	Poles
0	0	0

Chip Lain (born October 5, 1958) is an American former stock car racing driver who competed in the NASCAR Late Model Sportsman Series (now the NASCAR O'Reilly Auto Parts Series) between 1982 and 1983. During this time, Lain competed in 19 races, failing to reach the top 10 and achieving a career best 12th at Hickory Motor Speedway in 1983. Lain owned Connie Saylor's car for four races in 1985. He was also crew chief for Frank Fleming in six races during the 1990 season. He currently is an instructor and the program director for the Richard Childress Race Car Technology program at Forsyth Technical Community College.

== Motorsports career results ==
=== NASCAR ===
(key) (Bold – Pole position awarded by qualifying time. Italics – Pole position earned by points standings or practice time. * – Most laps led.)

==== Budweiser Late Model Sportsman Series ====
NASCAR Budweiser Late Model Sportsman Series results
Year	Team	No.	Make	1	2	3	4	5	6	7	8	9	10	11	12	13	14	15	16	17	18	19	20	21	22	23	24	25	26	27	28	29	30	31	32	33	34	35	NBLMSSC	Pts	Ref
1982	Lain Racing	37	Pontiac	DAY	RCH	BRI	MAR	DAR	HCY; 15	SBO	CRW; 17	RCH	LGY	DOV	HCY	CLT	ASH	HCY	SBO	CAR; 31	CRW	SBO	HCY	LGY	IRP; 16	BRI; 29	HCY	RCH	MAR	CLT; 27	HCY	MAR; DNQ							40th	591	
1983	Lain Racing	37	Pontiac	DAY	RCH	CAR; 24	HCY; 17	MAR	NWS	SBO	GPS	LGY	DOV; 23	BRI	CLT; 41	SBO	HCY	ROU	SBO	ROU	CRW; 14	ROU; 16	SBO; 22	HCY; 12	LGY; 19	IRP; 19	GPS	BRI	HCY	DAR; 33	RCH	NWS; 17	SBO	MAR; 26	ROU	CLT	HCY	MAR	25th	1270	
