= Jason Myers (racing driver) =

American racing driver (born 1978)

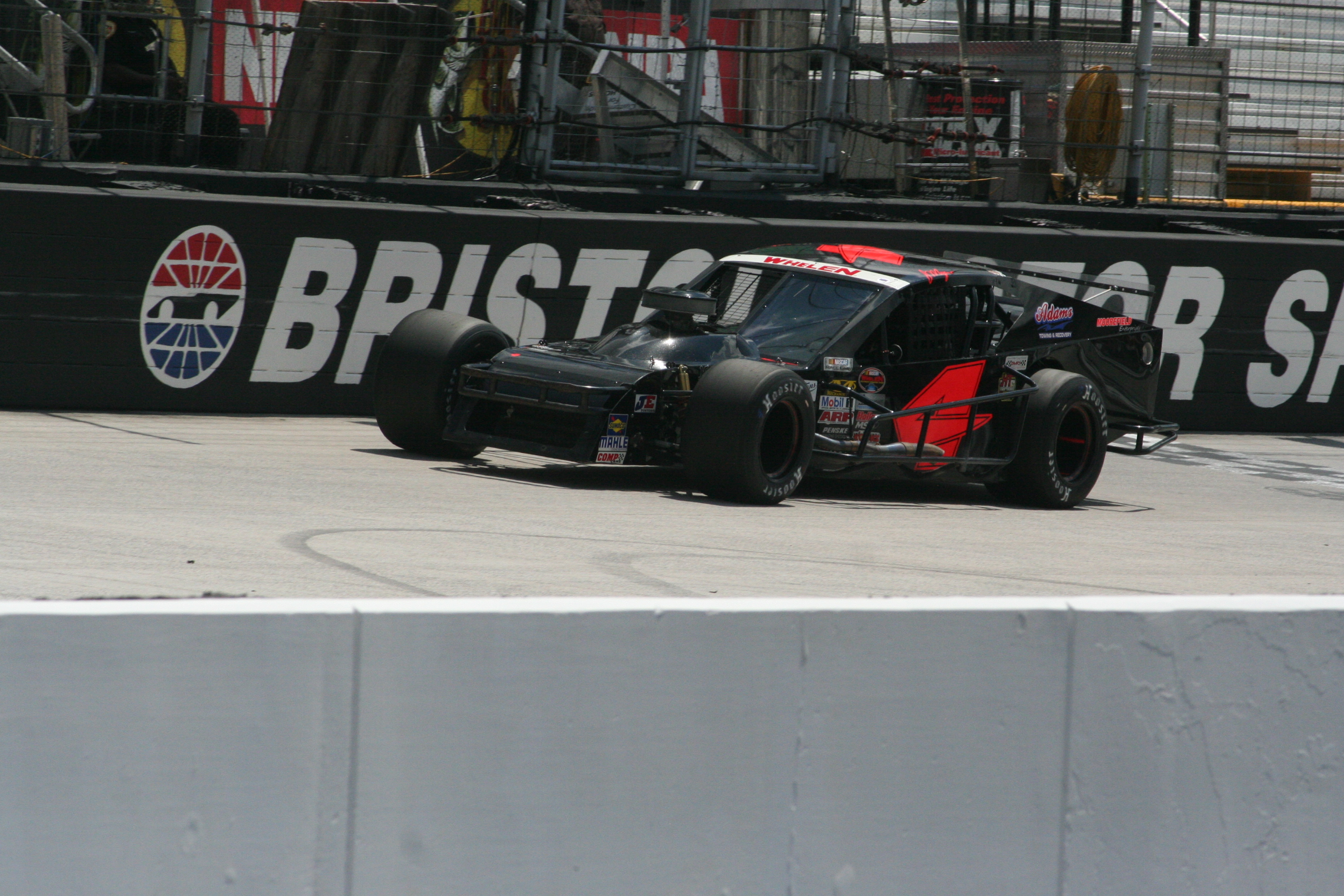
- Myers' No. 4 car at Bristol Motor Speedway in 2016
- Nationality: American
- Born: November 17, 1978 (age 47) Walnut Cove, North Carolina, U.S.
- Relatives: Burt Myers, Gary Myers, Bobby Myers, Billy Myers, Slate Myers

SMART Modified Tour, Bowman Gray Stadium Weekly Racing Series career
- Debut season: 1999
- Years active: 1999–present
- Car number: 4
- Former teams: Gary Myers
- Statistics up to date as of July 28, 2024.

Jason Myers (born November 17, 1978) is an American professional stock car racing driver who competes part-time in the SMART Modified Tour, driving the No. 4 for Gary Myers. He is the younger brother of multi-time Bowman Gray Stadium track champion Burt Myers.

Myers has also competed in the NASCAR Whelen Modified Tour, and now defunct NASCAR Whelen Southern Modified Tour, as well as the Southern Modified Racing Series, the ASA Southern Modified Race Tour, and the World Series of Asphalt Stock Car Racing.

== Motorsports results ==
=== NASCAR ===
(key) (Bold – Pole position awarded by qualifying time. Italics – Pole position earned by points standings or practice time. * – Most laps led.)

==== Whelen Modified Tour ====
NASCAR Whelen Modified Tour results
Year	Car owner	No.	Make	1	2	3	4	5	6	7	8	9	10	11	12	13	14	NWMTC	Pts	Ref
2010	Gary Myers	74	Chevy	TMP	STA	STA	MAR; 11	NHA	LIM	MND	RIV	STA	TMP	BRI	NHA	STA	TMP	45th	130	

==== Whelen Southern Modified Tour ====
NASCAR Whelen Southern Modified Tour results
Year	Car owner	No.	Make	1	2	3	4	5	6	7	8	9	10	11	12	13	14	NSWMTC	Pts	Ref
2005	Gary Myers	4	Chevy	CRW; 20	CRW; 16	CRW; 12	CRW; 9	BGS; 6	MAR	ACE; 3	ACE; 6							12th	1563	
2005	Gary Myers	4	Pontiac									CRW; 5	CRW; 5	SNM; 5	ACE; 6			12th	1563	
2006	Gary Myers	4	Chevy	CRW; 18	GRE; 6	CRW; 24	**DUB**; 3	CRW; 10	BGS; 1		CRW; 14	ACE; 7	CRW; 7	HCY; 13	**DUB**; 9	SNM; 7		6th	1788	
2006	Gary Myers	74	Chevy							MAR; 9								6th	1788	
2007	Gary Myers	4	Chevy	CRW; 20	FAI; 12	GRE; 7	**CRW**; 2*	CRW; 8	BGS; 9		ACE; 12	CRW; 6	SNM; 15	CRW; 4	**CRW**; 4			6th	1694	
2007	Gary Myers	41	Chevy							MAR; 6								6th	1694	
2008	Gary Myers	4	Chevy	CRW; 7	ACE; 4	CRW; 12												5th	1562	
2008	Gary Myers	4	Ford				CBGS; 18	**CRW**; 4	LAN; 8	CRW; 7	SNM; 6		CRW; 17	CRW; 4				5th	1562	
2008	Gary Myers	74	Ford									MAR; 6						5th	1562	
2009	Gary Myers	4	Ford	CON; 14	SBO; 9	**CRW**; 8	LAN; 5	CRW; 8	BGS; 17		CRW; 6		CRW; 4	CRW; 5		ACE; 5	CRW; 3	6th	2016	
2009	Gary Myers	6	Ford							BRI; 10					MAR; 4			6th	2016	
2009	Gary Myers	81	Chevy									MBS; 12						6th	2016	
2010	Gary Myers	4	Ford	ATL; 7	CRW; 18		CRW; 4	**BGS**; 4		CRW; 8	**LGY**; 6	TRI; 7	CLT; 17					7th	1427	
2010	Gary Myers	4	Chevy			SBO; 12												7th	1427	
2010	Gary Myers	14	Ford						BRI; 4									7th	1427	
2011	Gary Myers	4	Ford	CRW; 7	HCY; 7	SBO; 7	CRW; 6	CRW; 12	BGS; 4		CRW; 3	LGY; 5	THO; 12	TRI; 5	CRW; 7	CLT; 5	CRW; 6	3rd	2103	
2011	Gary Myers	41	Ford							BRI; 3								3rd	2103	
2012	Gary Myers	4	Ford	CRW; 2	CRW; 8	SBO; 20	CRW; 3	CRW; 5	BGS; 4	BRI; 8	LGY; 1	THO; 12	CRW; 4	CLT; 9				3rd	412	
2013	Gary Myers	4	Ford	CRW; 1	SNM; 12	SBO; 7	CRW; 9	CRW; 14	BGS; 12		LGY; 8	CRW; 10	CRW; 5	SNM; 6	CLT; 8			7th	428	
2013	Gary Myers	14	Ford							BRI; 11								7th	428	
2014	Gary Myers	4	Ford	CRW; 5	SNM; 11	SBO; 7	LGY; 9	CRW; 7	BGS; 13		LGY; 5	CRW; 16	SBO; 8	SNM; 9	CRW; 6	CRW; 17	CLT; 21	10th	465	
2014	Gary Myers	03	Chevy							BRI; 17								10th	465	
2015	Gary Myers	4	Ford	**CRW**; 2	CRW; 6	SBO; 10	LGY; 6	CRW; 2	BGS; 10	BRI; 5	LGY; 5	SBO; 7	CLT; 4					3rd	385	
2016	Gary Myers	4	Ford	CRW; 4	**CON**; 5	SBO; 9	CRW; 2	CRW; 11	BGS; 2		ECA; 4	SBO; 8	CRW; 3	CLT; 9				6th	418	
2016	Gary Myers	4S	Ford							BRI; 10								6th	418	

=== SMART Modified Tour ===
SMART Modified Tour results
Year	Car owner	No.	Make	1	2	3	4	5	6	7	8	9	10	11	12	13	14	SMTC	Pts	Ref
2000	N/A	N/A	N/A	CRW	JAC	AND	CRW	MYB	CRW	ACE; 12	CRW; 20	PUL; 14	CRW; 10	CRW; 17				23rd	593	
2001	N/A	7	N/A	CRW; 23	CRW; 20	AND; 13	LAN; 14	CRW; 20	MYB; 25	ACE; 21	CRW; 10	PUL; 12	CRW; 5	CRW; 18	CRW; 8	SBS; 11		10th	1615	
2002	N/A	7	N/A	SUM; 6	CRW; 4	LAN; 15	CRW; 20	ACE; 10	CRW; 19	PUL; 17	CRW; 19	CON; 9	CRW; 12					10th	1339	
2003	Gary Myers	14	N/A	CRW; 4	SUM; 11	CRW; 16	UMP	UMP; 11	CRW; 9		ACE; 15				UMP; 13			12th	1631	
2003	Gary Myers	74	N/A							MYB; 7		CRW; 14	UMP; 5	CON; 19				12th	1631	
2004	Gary Myers	74	N/A	CRW; 6		CRW; 15	CRW; 13											11th	1684	
2004	Gary Myers	14	N/A		UMP; 21													11th	1684	
2004	Gary Myers	4	N/A					UMP; 2	UMP; 8	CRW; 11	MYB; 15	CRW; 6	CRW; 21	**PUL**; 8	CON; 23	UMP; 7		11th	1684	
2021	Gary Myers	4	PSR	CRW; 12	FLO; 8	SBO; 5	FCS; 3	CRW; 10	DIL; 6	CAR; 9	CRW; 7	DOM; 3	PUL; 16	HCY; 8	ACE; 17			5th	264	
2022	Gary Myers	4	PSR	FLO; 9	SNM; 8	CRW; 11	SBO; 13	FCS; 8		NWS; 13	NWS; 29	CAR; 7	DOM; 7	HCY; 10	TRI; 6	PUL; 8		8th	230	
2022	Gary Myers	6A	PSR						CRW; 24									8th	230	
2023	Gary Myers	4	PSR	FLO; 8	CRW; 14	SBO; 10	HCY; 14	FCS; 15	CRW; 12	ACE; 10	CAR; 26	PUL; 15	**TRI**; 8	SBO; 8	**ROU**; 11			8th	341	
2024	Gary Myers	4	PSR	FLO; 10	CRW; 6	SBO; 14	TRI; 6	ROU; 11	HCY; 13	FCS; 8	CRW; 9	JAC; 20	CAR; 21	CRW; 11	DOM; 9	SBO; 14	NWS; 13	10th	406	
2026	Gary Myers	4	PSR	FLO	AND	SBO	DOM	HCY	WKS	FCR	CRW; 22	PUL				NWS; Wth		43rd	48	
2026	Gary Myers	4J	PSR										CAR; 12	ROU	TRI			43rd	48	
