= Jay Foley =

American racing driver

- Nationality: American
- Born: February 24, 1964 (age 62) Stuart, Virginia, U.S.

NASCAR Whelen Southern Modified Tour career
- Debut season: 2005
- Years active: 2005–2009
- Starts: 38
- Championships: 0
- Wins: 0
- Poles: 0
- Best finish: 7th in 2005
- Statistics up to date as of October 16, 2024.

Jay Foley (born February 24, 1964) is an American professional stock car racing driver who competed in the now defunct NASCAR Whelen Southern Modified Tour from 2005 to 2009.

Foley has previously competed in series such as the NASCAR Whelen Modified Tour, the SMART Modified Tour, and the ASA Southern Modified Race Tour.

== Motorsports results ==
=== NASCAR ===
(key) (Bold – Pole position awarded by qualifying time. Italics – Pole position earned by points standings or practice time. * – Most laps led.)

==== Featherlite Modified Tour ====
NASCAR Featherlite Modified Tour results
Year	Team	No.	Make	1	2	3	4	5	6	7	8	9	10	11	12	13	14	15	16	17	18	19	20	21	22	23	NFMTC	Pts	Ref
1992	N/A	54	Chevy	MAR	TMP	RCH	STA	MAR	NHA	NZH	STA	TMP	FLE	RIV	NHA	STA	RPS	RIV	TMP; 17	TMP	NHA	STA	MAR	TMP			N/A	0	
1997	N/A	57	Chevy	TMP	MAR; DNQ	STA	NZH	STA	NHA	FLE	JEN	RIV	GLN	NHA	RPS	HOL	TMP	RIV	NHA	GLN	STA	NHA	STA	FLE	TMP	RCH	N/A	0	
1999	N/A	57	Chevy	TMP	RPS	STA	RCH; 35	STA	RIV	JEN	NHA	NZH	HOL	TMP	NHA	RIV	GLN	STA	RPS	TMP	NHA	STA					N/A	0	
1999	N/A	51	Chevy																				MAR; 13	TMP			N/A	0	
2001	N/A	57	Chevy	SBO; 32	TMP	STA	WFD	NZH	STA	RIV	SEE	RCH	NHA	HOL	RIV	CHE	TMP	STA	WFD	TMP	STA	MAR	TMP				103rd	67	

==== Whelen Southern Modified Tour ====
NASCAR Whelen Southern Modified Tour results
Year	Car owner	No.	Make	1	2	3	4	5	6	7	8	9	10	11	12	13	14	NWSMTC	Pts	Ref
2005	Jay Foley	57	Chevy	CRW; 2	CRW; 2*	CRW; 7	CRW; 17	BGS; 18	MAR; 2	ACE; 13	ACE; 7	CRW; 11	CRW; 7	DUB; 17	ACE; 10			7th	1669	
2006	N/A	01	Chevy	CRW	GRE	CRW; 12		CRW; 11					CRW; 14			SNM; 13		11th	1492	
2006	Jay Foley	57	Chevy				DUB; 2*											11th	1492	
2006	Melvin Swisher	53	Chevy						BGS; 20									11th	1492	
2006	N/A	57	Chevy							MAR; 5				HCY; 15				11th	1492	
2006	N/A	01	Dodge								CRW; 10							11th	1492	
2006	N/A	57	Dodge									ACE; 4						11th	1492	
2006	Melvin Swisher	57	Chevy												DUB; 6			11th	1492	
2007	Al Baird	57	Chevy	CRW; 22	FAI	GRE	CRW; 14	CRW	BGS	MAR; 4	ACE; 11	CRW						17th	850	
2007	Al Baird	01	Chevy										SNM; 14	CRW; 15	CRW; 20			17th	850	
2008	Al Baird	01	Chevy	CRW; 21	ACE; 5	CRW	BGS	CRW; 14	LAN	CRW; 9	SNM	MAR; 8	CRW	CRW; 22				19th	753	
2009	Al Baird	01	Chevy	CON	SBO	CRW; 18	LAN	CRW	BGS	BRI	CRW	MBS	CRW	CRW	MAR; 8	ACE	CRW	31st	251	
