= Michael Clifton =

American racing driver

- Nationality: American
- Born: October 12, 1968 (age 58) Walkertown, North Carolina, U.S.

NASCAR Whelen Southern Modified Tour career
- Debut season: 2005
- Years active: 2005–2007
- Starts: 26
- Championships: 0
- Wins: 0
- Poles: 1
- Best finish: 5th in 2005
- Statistics up to date as of October 17, 2024.

Michael Clifton (born October 12, 1968) is an American professional stock car racing driver who competed in the now defunct NASCAR Whelen Southern Modified Tour from 2005 to 2007.

Foley has previously competed in series such as the SMART Modified Tour and the Southern Modified Racing Series, and is a frequent competitor at Bowman Gray Stadium in the modified ranks.

== Motorsports results ==
=== NASCAR ===
(key) (Bold – Pole position awarded by qualifying time. Italics – Pole position earned by points standings or practice time. * – Most laps led.)

==== Whelen Southern Modified Tour ====
NASCAR Whelen Southern Modified Tour results
Year	Car owner	No.	Make	1	2	3	4	5	6	7	8	9	10	11	12	13	NWSMTC	Pts	Ref
2005	Scott Widener	50	Chevy	CRW; 9	CRW; 4	CRW; 9	CRW; 4	BGS; 5	MAR; 14	ACE; 16	ACE; 3	CRW; 4*	CRW; 8	DUB; 14*	**ACE**; 3		5th	1740	
2006	Scott Widener	50	Chevy	CRW; 7	GRE; 21	CRW; 13	DUB; 12	CRW; 21	BGS; 6	MAR; 3	CRW; 8	ACE; 10	CRW	HCY; 23	DUB; 21	SNM	12th	1382	
2007	Lori Beth Clifton	50	Chevy	CRW; 11	FAI	GRE	CRW; 17	CRW	BGS	MAR	ACE	CRW; 19	SNM	CRW	CRW		26th	445	
