= Brian Loftin (racing driver) =

American racing driver (born 1977)

- Nationality: American
- Born: July 29, 1977 (age 49) Lexington, North Carolina, U.S.

NASCAR Whelen Southern Modified Tour career
- Debut season: 2005
- Years active: 2005–2014
- Starts: 86
- Championships: 1
- Wins: 12
- Poles: 11
- Best finish: 1st in 2008
- Statistics up to date as of August 22, 2024.

Brian Loftin (born July 29, 1977) is an American professional stock car racing driver who competed in the now defunct NASCAR Whelen Southern Modified Tour from 2005 to 2014. He is the father of Carson Loftin, who currently competes part-time in the NASCAR Whelen Modified Tour.

Loftin is a former champion of the Southern Modified Tour, having won the championship in 2008, where he won Three races and eleven pole positions.

Loftin has previously competed in series such as the NASCAR Whelen Modified Tour, the SMART Modified Tour, the NASCAR Goody's Dash Series, the Southern Modified Racing Series, the ASA Southern Modified Race Tour, and the 602 Modified Tour.

== Motorsports results ==
=== NASCAR ===
(key) (Bold – Pole position awarded by qualifying time. Italics – Pole position earned by points standings or practice time. * – Most laps led.)

==== Goody's Dash Series ====
NASCAR Goody's Dash Series results
Year	Team	No.	Make	1	2	3	4	5	6	7	8	9	10	11	12	13	14	15	16	17	18	NGDS	Pts	Ref
2001	N/A	23	Pontiac	DAY	ROU	DAR	CLT; 14	LOU	JAC	KEN; 21	SBO	DAY; 11	GRE	SNM	NRV	MYB	BRI; 9	ACE; 7	JAC	USA	NSH	34th	635	
2002	N/A	23	Pontiac	DAY; 9	HAR; 9	ROU; 25	LON; 7	CLT; 13	KEN; 21	MEM; 19	GRE; 16	SNM; 6	SBO; 24	MYB; 7	BRI; 16	MOT	ATL					13th	1457	
2003	N/A	23	Pontiac	DAY; 22	OGL	CLT; 25	SBO; 18	GRE	KEN	BRI; 16	ATL											29th	409	

==== Whelen Modified Tour ====
NASCAR Whelen Modified Tour results
Year	Car owner	No.	Make	1	2	3	4	5	6	7	8	9	10	11	12	13	14	15	16	17	18	19	20	21	NWMTC	Pts	Ref
1999	N/A	23	N/A	TMP	RPS	STA	RCH	STA	RIV	JEN	NHA	NZH	HOL	TMP	NHA	RIV	GLN	STA	RPS	TMP	NHA	STA	MAR; DNQ	TMP	N/A	0	
2005	N/A	2	Chevy	TMP	STA	RIV	WFD	STA	JEN	NHA; 12	BEE	SEE	RIV	STA	TMP	WFD	MAR	TMP	NHA	STA	TMP				70th	127	
2006	N/A	23	Chevy	TMP	STA	JEN	TMP	STA	NHA	HOL	RIV	STA	TMP	MAR	TMP	NHA; 29	WFD	TMP	STA						68th	76	
2008	Brian Loftin	23	Chevy	TMP	STA	STA	TMP	NHA; 11	SPE	RIV	STA	TMP	MAN	TMP	NHA	MAR	CHE	STA	TMP						50th	130	

==== Whelen Southern Modified Tour ====
NASCAR Whelen Southern Modified Tour results
Year	Car owner	No.	Make	1	2	3	4	5	6	7	8	9	10	11	12	13	14	NSWMTC	Pts	Ref
2005	Bobby Loftin	23	Chevy	CRW; 21	CRW; 17	CRW; 3	CRW; 1	BGS; 16	MAR; 1	ACE; 4	ACE; 4	CRW; 8	CRW; 1	**DUB**; 1	ACE; 2			3rd	1844	
2006	Bobby Loftin	23	Chevy	CRW; 13	GRE; 12	**CRW**; 15	**DUB**; 23	**CRW**; 7	BGS	MAR; 11	CRW; 4	ACE	CRW; 5	HCY; 9	DUB; 18	SNM		13th	1301	
2007	Bobby Loftin	23	Chevy	CRW; 3	FAI; 17	GRE	CRW	CRW; 17	BGS; 11	**MAR**; 13	ACE; 3	CRW; 18	SNM	**CRW**; 1*	**CRW**; 1*			12th	1277	
2008	Bobby Loftin	23	Chevy	CRW; 3	ACE; 17	CRW; 1	BGS; 1**	CRW; 1*	LAN; 4	CRW; 2	SNM; 15	MAR; 1	CRW; 2	CRW; 3				1st	1780	
2009	Bobby Loftin	23	Chevy	CON; 15	SBO; 5	CRW; 3	LAN; 4		**BGS**; 9	BRI; 6	CRW; 1*	MBS; 6	CRW; 15	CRW; 3	MAR; 10	ACE; 4	CRW; 8	4th	2090	
2009	Bobby Loftin	23	Pontiac					CRW; 5										4th	2090	
2010	Bobby Loftin	23	Chevy	ATL; 16	CRW; 4	SBO; 10	CRW; 16	BGS	BRI	CRW; 17	LGY	TRI; 6	CLT					15th	791	
2011	Bobby Loftin	23	Chevy	**CRW**; 18	HCY	SBO	CRW	**CRW**; 13	BGS	BRI	CRW	LGY	THO	TRI	CRW; 4	CLT	CRW; 5	20th	558	
2012	Bobby Loftin	23	Chevy	CRW; 7	CRW; 1*	SBO; 23	CRW; 12	CRW; 4	BGS; 22	BRI	LGY	THO	CRW; 2*	CLT				15th	245	
2013	Bobby Loftin	23	Chevy	CRW; 11	SNM; 23	SBO; 2	CRW; 5	CRW; 4	BGS; 20	BRI	LGY	CRW	CRW	SNM	CLT			16th	199	
2014	Bobby Loftin	23	Chevy	CRW; 7	SNM; 14	SBO	LGY; 16	CRW; 15	BGS	BRI	LGY	CRW	SBO; 13	**SNM**; 8	CRW; 2	CRW	CLT	17th	235	

=== SMART Modified Tour ===
SMART Modified Tour results
Year	Car owner	No.	Make	1	2	3	4	5	6	7	8	9	10	11	12	13	14	SMTC	Pts	Ref
2000	Bobby Loftin	23	N/A	CRW; 12	JAC; 2	AND; 5	CRW; 9	MYB; 13	CRW; 10	ACE; 10	CRW; 22	PUL; 18	CRW; 20	CRW; 13				8th	1515	
2001	Bobby Loftin	23	N/A	CRW; 21	CRW; 14	AND	LAN	CRW	MYB; 3	ACE; 3	CRW	PUL; 25	CRW	CRW; 14	CRW	SBS		24th	845	
2003	Bobby Loftin	23	N/A	CRW	SUM	CRW	UMP	UMP	CRW	MYB; 10	ACE; 15	CRW	UMP	CON	UMP			35th	252	
2004	Bobby Loftin	23	N/A	CRW; 21	UMP; 15	CRW; 2	CRW; 3	UMP; 19	UMP; 3	CRW; 5	**MYB**; 1	CRW; 1	CRW; 11	PUL; 1**	CON; 4	UMP; 1		2nd	1989	
2021	Grady Jeffreys Jr.	15	Troyer	CRW; 14	FLO; 3	SBO; 15	FCS; 6	CRW; 4	DIL; 7	CAR; 5	**CRW**; 6	DOM; 7	PUL; 4	HCY; 7	ACE; 3			3rd	277	
2022	Grady Jeffreys Jr.	15	Troyer	FLO; 7	SNM; 6	CRW; 5	SBO; 9	FCS; 9	CRW; 17	NWS; 9	NWS; 2	CAR; 1	DOM; 15	HCY; 19	**TRI**; 1	PUL; 3		4th	275	
2023	Grady Jeffreys Jr.	15	Troyer	FLO; 16	CRW; 8	SBO; 1*	HCY; 13	FCS; 7	CRW; 5	ACE; 17	CAR; 20	PUL; 13	TRI; 3	SBO; 15	ROU; 5			7th	385	
2024	Grady Jeffreys Jr.	15	Troyer	FLO; 11	CRW; 18	SBO; DNS	TRI; 19	ROU; 19	HCY	FCS; 17	CRW; 11	JAC; 6	CAR; 17	CRW; 2	DOM; 10	SBO; 13	NWS	13th	328	
