= Frank Fleming (racing driver) =

American auto racing driver

- Born: July 25, 1959 (age 67); Mount Airy, North Carolina, U.S.

NASCAR O'Reilly Auto Parts Series career
- 10 races run over 4 years
- Best finish: 51st (1990)
- First race: 1988 Gatorade 200 (Darlington)
- Last race: 1991 Roses Stores 300 (Rougemont)
Wins	Top tens	Poles
0	0	0

Frank Fleming (born July 25, 1959) is an American stock car racing driver. Fleming previously competed in the NASCAR Busch Series and the NASCAR Whelen Southern Modified Tour. Currently, he competes part-time in the NASCAR Whelen Modified Tour.

Fleming competed in ten NASCAR Busch Series races between 1988 and 1991. During the 1990 season, Fleming's crew chief was former NASCAR driver Chip Lain. His best career Busch Series finish was a twentieth at Daytona International Speedway in 1990.

Fleming competed in a total of 106 NASCAR Southern Modified Tour races between 2005 and 2015. During this span, Fleming achieved 66 top-tens, one pole position, and one win.

Between 1986 and 2025, Fleming competed in a total of 34 NASCAR Whelen Modified Tour races. He has four top-tens.

== Motorsports career results ==
=== NASCAR ===
(key) (Bold – Pole position awarded by qualifying time. Italics – Pole position earned by points standings or practice time. * – Most laps led.)

==== Busch Series ====
NASCAR Busch Series results
Year	Team	No.	Make	1	2	3	4	5	6	7	8	9	10	11	12	13	14	15	16	17	18	19	20	21	22	23	24	25	26	27	28	29	30	31	NBSC	Pts	Ref
1988		40	Buick	DAY	HCY	CAR	MAR	DAR	BRI	LNG	NZH	SBO	NSV	CLT	DOV	ROU	LAN	LVL	MYB	OXF	SBO	HCY	LNG	IRP	ROU	BRI	DAR; 28	RCH	DOV	MAR	CLT	CAR; 24	MAR		70th	170	
1989	Pharo Racing	33	Olds	DAY	CAR	MAR	HCY	DAR	BRI	NZH	SBO	LAN	NSV	CLT	DOV	ROU	LVL	VOL	MYB	SBO	HCY	DUB	IRP	ROU	BRI	DAR	RCH	DOV	MAR	CLT; 24	CAR	MAR			103rd	-	
1990	Pharo Racing	33	Olds	DAY; 20	RCH; DNQ	CAR	MAR	HCY; 21	DAR; 40	BRI	LAN	SBO; 21	NZH; 22	HCY; 28	CLT	DOV	ROU	VOL	MYB	OXF	NHA	SBO	DUB	IRP	ROU	BRI	DAR	RCH	DOV	MAR	CLT	NHA	CAR	MAR	51st	522	
1991	Thackston Racing	24	Ford	DAY	RCH	CAR	MAR	VOL	HCY	DAR	BRI	LAN	SBO	NZH	CLT	DOV	ROU; 26	HCY	MYB	GLN	OXF	NHA	SBO	DUB	IRP	ROU	BRI	DAR	RCH	DOV	CLT	NHA	CAR	MAR	99th	85	
