= SMART Modified Tour =

Stock car racing series

Southern Modified Auto Racing Teams (SMART) Tour
- Category: Stock cars
- Country: United States
- Inaugural season: 1989 (SMART); 2005 (NASCAR)
- Manufacturers: Chevrolet · Ford · Pontiac
- Tire suppliers: Hoosier
- Drivers' champion: Jake Crum
- Makes' champion: N/A
- Teams' champion: Jake Crum Racing
- Official website: SMART Modified Tour

The Southern Modified Auto Racing Teams (SMART) Tour is a modified stock car racing series held in the Southeastern region of the United States. The series began in 1989, NASCAR took over the series in 2005. During its time as a NASCAR sanctioned series it followed identical regulations to the Northern NASCAR Whelen Modified Tour.

The series merged with the Northern Modified Tour in 2017 bringing an end to the series after almost 30 years.

The series came back in late 2020 without NASCAR sanction under the SMART Tour name and ran its first full season since 2004, in 2021 with the likes of Bobby Labonte and Ryan Preece competing, after only 4 events in 2020.

All races are broadcast live on FloRacing.

== History ==
NASCAR itself has a long tradition of Modified racing in the Southeastern U.S., prior to the formation of today's Northeast-based Whelen Modified Tour in 1985. The evolution of Modified racing began in the late 1940s with the first NASCAR sanctioned race taking place at the Daytona Beach course in February, 1948. Coupes and sedans were the vehicles of choice and provided a new form of entertainment as tracks began to spring up all over the country. NASCAR Modified teams competed in championship events up and down the east coast, including stops at Bowman Gray Stadium in Winston-Salem, North Carolina, North Wilkesboro Speedway and Martinsville Speedway. Top drivers from North Carolina and Virginia, such as Ralph Brinkley, Ray Hendrick and Satch Worley, were regular NASCAR Modified competitors.

In the late 1980s, while modified racing was maintaining its popularity in the Northeast, Late Model Stock cars moved into the spotlight throughout the South. The downward slide suffered by the Southern Modifieds made many people feel that the division was fading, and quite possibly disappearing altogether from the region.

=== The S.M.A.R.T. TOUR Era ===
In September 1988, after a rain-out in Myrtle Beach, South Carolina, a group of dedicated car owners and drivers banded together and formed the Southern Modified Auto Racing Teams, or S.M.A.R.T., as they became known to race fans throughout the region. The group set as its goal to strive to return Modifieds to their previous state of popularity in the South. For the next 16 years, Modified racing through the S.M.A.R.T. Tour raced at tracks throughout the Carolinas and Virginia.

==== 1989 season ====
The inaugural season included a total of six races. The schedule had two races each at North Wilkesboro and Pulaski County, and one race each at Langley and Myrtle Beach. The first race in series history was on April 9, 1989, at Langley Speedway in Hampton, Virginia. Eighteen modifieds entered the inaugural event. Frank Fleming's pole-winning lap of 15.990 seconds (89.660 mph) for the event was the quickest in Langley's history. Robert Jeffreys earned the honor of being the first race winner by holding off Philip Smith. At the Lowes 150 on April 15 at North Wilkesboro Speedway, driver Don Smith had to be cut from his car after crashing on the second lap. Smith had a broken left shoulder from the crash. Northern Modified superstar Jimmy Spencer won in his only career S.M.A.R.T. start after recovering from a mid-race crash to finish two car-lengths ahead of Gary Myers. The season concluded at Pulaski County Speedway on October 15. Johnny Bush grabbed his only career series victory while Philip Smith was crowned the tour's inaugural champion. In the first season there were six different winners, with no driver winning more than one event.

#	Event	Date	Track	Pole-winner	Winner
1	Modified 150	April 9, 1989	Langley Speedway (Hampton, VA)	Frank Fleming	Robert Jeffreys
2	Lowe's 150	April 15, 1989	North Wilkesboro Speedway (North Wilkesboro, NC)		Jimmy Spencer
3		July 1, 1989	Pulaski County Speedway (Radford, VA)		Tony Jankowiak
4		September 9, 1989	Myrtle Beach Speedway (Myrtle Beach, SC)		Frank Fleming
5		September 17, 1989	North Wilkesboro Speedway (North Wilkesboro, NC)	Philip Smith	Philip Smith
6		October 15, 1989	Pulaski County Speedway (Radford, VA)		Johnny Bush

==== 1990 season ====
The second season grew to eight races. The season began at Hickory Motor Speedway on March 31, and ended on September 29 at Caraway Speedway. North Wilkesboro was the only track to hold more than one event (two races were held there). This was the first season that had a race held at Caraway Speedway, which would later hold the most races in series history. Junior Miller won his first career series win at the season opener at Hickory Motor Speedway. It wasn't until April 21 at North Wilkesboro Speedway (the third race of the year and the ninth race in series history) that a driver became a repeat winner in the series. Robert Jeffreys held off Jimmy Spencer to win his second career SMART race. Jay Hedgecock became the first repeat winner of the 1990 season at Pulaski County, holding off Johnny Bryant and Frank Fleming. The race was stopped on lap 73 because of an accident with the cleanup truck. After a blown engine, the track safety truck lost the Stay-Dry spreader, dumping the chemical all over the second turn and causing a red flag for 17 minutes. Jay Hedgecock ended the year at Caraway Speedway with his third consecutive victory and fifth triumph in the eight-race season. There were only three winners during the season: Jay Hedgecock, Junior Miller and Robert Jeffreys. Hedgecock dominated the season and won the season championship.

#	Event	Date	Track	Pole-winner	Winner
1		March 31, 1990	Hickory Motor Speedway (Hickory, NC)		Junior Miller
2		April 13, 1990	Tri-County Motor Speedway (Hudson, NC)	Jay Hedgecock	Jay Hedgecock
3	Lowe's 150	April 21, 1990	North Wilkesboro Speedway (North Wilkesboro, NC)		Robert Jeffreys
4		July 7, 1990	Pulaski County Speedway (Radford, VA)		Jay Hedgecock
5		August 26, 1990	Lonesome Pine International Raceway (Coeburn, VA)		Junior Miller
6		September 1, 1990	Myrtle Beach Speedway (Myrtle Beach, SC)		Jay Hedgecock
7		September 16, 1990	North Wilkesboro Speedway (North Wilkesboro, NC)	Billy Middleton	Jay Hedgecock
8		September 29, 1990	Caraway Speedway (Asheboro, NC)		Jay Hedgecock

==== 1991 season ====
The third season held seven races, starting off with the season opener on April 13 at Concord Motorsport Park, and ending on October 5 at Lanier Speedway. The event at Lanier Speedway, in Braselton, GA, was the first event held outside of Virginia and the Carolinas. Junior Miller dominated the Motor Mile Speedway event, leading all but 25 laps of the race and holding off pole winner Jay Hedgecock. Hedgecock had to be treated for exhaustion after driving the entire race without power steering. Philip Smith dominated the race at North Wilkesboro, leading the last 91 laps en route to his only 1991 victory. The only other leader of the race, pole sitter Gary Myers (son of late NASCAR driver Billy Myers and better known as the father of Jason Myers and Burt Myers), fell out with mechanical issues. Junior Miller claimed both his third victory of the season and his first S.M.A.R.T. season title at the season finale at Lanier Speedway. There were five winners during the season. Miller won the most races during the season with three wins.

#	Event	Date	Track	Pole-winner	Winner
1		April 13, 1991	Concord Motorsport Park (Concord, NC)		Gary Myers
2		April 20, 1991	Caraway Speedway (Asheboro, NC)		Junior Miller
3		July 6, 1991	Motor Mile Speedway (Radford, VA)	Jay Hedgecock	Junior Miller
4		August 31, 1991	Myrtle Beach Speedway (Myrtle Beach, SC)		Billy Middleton
5		September 8, 1991	Tri-County Motor Speedway (Hudson, NC)		Jay Hedgecock
6		September 15, 1991	North Wilkesboro Speedway (North Wilkesboro, NC)	Gary Myers	Philip Smith
7		October 5, 1991	Lanier Speedway (Braselton, GA)		Junior Miller

==== 1992 season ====
The 1992 season held thirteen races, nearly twice as many as any previous season. The season began on April 11 at North Wilkesboro Speedway, and ended on November 3 at Caraway Speedway. Tour races were held at Bowman Gray Stadium for the first time. In the season opener, Paul Spencer, brother of NASCAR's Jimmy Spencer, claimed his only series victory by holding off Jay Hedgecock. Bobby Hutchens was the pole winner for the race but fell out on the 13th lap due to a mechanical failure. There were six winners during the season. Frank Fleming won the most races during the season with four wins, but Jay Hedgecock would claim his second series championship at the end of the season, becoming the first multiple time championship winner of the series.

#	Event	Date	Track	Pole-winner	Winner
1	Lowe's 150	April 11, 1992	North Wilkesboro Speedway (North Wilkesboro, NC)	Bobby Hutchens	Paul Spencer
2		April 18, 1992	Caraway Speedway (Asheboro, NC)		Frank Fleming
3		May 2, 1992	Bowman Gray Stadium (Winston-Salem, NC)	Junior Miller	Ralph Brinkley
4		July 3, 1992	Tri-County Motor Speedway (Hudson, NC)		Jay Hedgecock
5		July 4, 1992	Caraway Speedway (Asheboro, NC)		Junior Miller
6		August 1, 1992	Bowman Gray Stadium (Winston-Salem, NC)		Gary Myers
7		September 7, 1992	Myrtle Beach Speedway (Myrtle Beach, SC)		Jay Hedgecock
8		September 14, 1992	Caraway Speedway (Asheboro, NC)		Gary Myers
9		September 18, 1992	Tri-County Motor Speedway (Hudson, NC)		Gary Myers
10		September 20, 1992	North Wilkesboro Speedway (North Wilkesboro, NC)		Frank Fleming
11		September 26, 1992	Caraway Speedway (Asheboro, NC)		Frank Fleming
12		October 3, 1992	South Boston Speedway (South Boston, VA)		Frank Fleming
13		November 3, 1992	Caraway Speedway (Asheboro, NC)		Jay Hedgecock

==== 1993 season ====
The 1993 season held ten races. The season began at Caraway Speedway on March 13, and also ended at Caraway Speedway on October 30. There were seven winners during the season, the most in a season for the series. Junior Miller won three races, the most wins by any driver during the season, and claimed his second series championship, beating Philip Smith by just 17 points.

#	Event	Date	Track	Pole-winner	Winner
1		March 13, 1993	Caraway Speedway (Asheboro, NC)	Gary Myers	Junior Miller
2		March 27, 1993	Summerville Speedway (Summerville, SC)	Al Hill	Robert Jeffreys
3		July 2, 1993	Tri-County Motor Speedway (Hudson, NC)		Billy Middleton
4		September 4, 1993	Caraway Speedway (Asheboro, NC)		Philip Smith
5		September 18, 1993	Myrtle Beach Speedway (Myrtle Beach, SC)	Gary Myers	Philip Smith
6		September 25, 1993	Southern National Motorsports Park (Kenly, NC)		Al Hill
7		October 2, 1993	Caraway Speedway (Asheboro, NC)	Junior Miller	Gary Myers
8		October 16, 1993	Tri-County Motor Speedway (Hudson, NC)	Frank Fleming	Junior Miller
9		October 23, 1993	South Boston Speedway (South Boston, VA)	Frank Fleming	Frank Fleming
10		October 30, 1993	Caraway Speedway (Asheboro, NC)	Philip Smith	Junior Miller

==== 1994 season ====
The 1994 season held nine races. The seasoneason began at Caraway Speedway on April 2, and again ended at Caraway Speedway on October 30. At the season opener, Tim Arre began his ascension, holding off early race leader Frank Fleming for his first S.M.A.R.T. victory. There were six winners during the season, with Tim Arre scoring the most wins with three. Arre would win the 1994 season championship.

#	Event	Date	Track	Pole-winner	Winner
1		April 2, 1994	Caraway Speedway (Asheboro, NC)		Tim Arre
2		April 23, 1994	Summerville Speedway (Summerville, SC)		Frank Fleming
3		July 1, 1994	Tri-County Motor Speedway (Hudson, NC)		Philip Smith
4		July 2, 1994	Caraway Speedway (Asheboro, NC)		Bobby Hutchens
5		September 3, 1994	Myrtle Beach Speedway (Myrtle Beach, SC)		Tim Arre
6		September 10, 1994	Caraway Speedway (Asheboro, NC)		Frank Fleming
7		September 24, 1994	Ace Speedway (Altamahaw, NC)		Tim Arre
8		October 8, 1994	Southern National Motorsports Park (Kenly, NC)		Roger Hill
9		October 30, 1994	Caraway Speedway (Asheboro, NC)		Junior Miller

==== 1995 season ====
The 1995 season held ten races. The season began at Summerville Speedway on April 1, and ended at Caraway Speedway on October 29. At the season opener, defending series champ Tim Arre started his title defense off well by winning the event. Tim Arre won his fifth and his final series race at Myrtle Beach Speedway on September 2, holding off Gary Myers after the duo swapped the lead multiple times during the event. At Franklin County Speedway on October 7, Jay Foley captured his first series victory, leading the last 69 laps. This race had a significance to Kenny Minter. Minter was racing in memory of his dad, winning the pole and leading the first 81 laps. However, a two-tire stop doomed Minter to fourteenth. Tragedy struck during the final season race at Caraway Speedway. On lap 87 of the 200 lap race, the cars of Kenny Minter and Brian King touched entering turn three, and Minter's car slammed the outer retaining wall before coming back across and coming to rest in Turn 4. Minter was taken to Randolph Memorial Hospital in Asheboro, where he was pronounced dead from his injuries. There were five different winners during the season. Junior Miller won the most races, with five, and his third season championship (by 145 points over runner-up Bobby Hutchens).

#	Event	Date	Track	Pole-winner	Winner
1	Azalea 150	April 1, 1995	Summerville Speedway (Summerville, SC)	Tim Brown	Tim Arre
2		April 8, 1995	Caraway Speedway (Asheboro, NC)	Junior Miller	Frank Fleming
3	Fairvalue 150	June 30, 1995	Tri-County Motor Speedway (Hudson, NC)		Al Hill
4		July 1, 1995	Caraway Speedway (Asheboro, NC)	Randy Butner	Junior Miller
5		September 2, 1995	Myrtle Beach Speedway (Myrtle Beach, SC)	Tim Arre	Tim Arre
6	Hayes Jewelers 150	September 9, 1995	Caraway Speedway (Asheboro, NC)		Junior Miller
7		September 30, 1995	Peach State Speedway (Jefferson, GA)	Tim Arre	Junior Miller
8		October 7, 1995	Franklin County Speedway (Callaway, VA)	Gary Myers	Jay Foley
9		October 14, 1995	Hickory Motor Speedway (Hickory, NC)	Junior Miller	Junior Miller
10	Mid-Atlantic 500	October 29, 1995	Caraway Speedway (Asheboro, NC)	Tim Brown	Junior Miller

===== 1995 top 10 points standings =====
Rank	Driver	Points	Diff	Starts	Wins	T5	T10	Poles
1	Junior Miller	1752		10	5	8	9	
2	Bobby Hutchens	1607	−145	10	0	6	8	
3	Jay Foley	1508	−244	10	1	2	6	
4	Tim Dwiggins	1497	−255	10	0	4	7	
5	Roger Hill	1398	−354	10	0	2	4	
6	Al Hill	1372	−380	10	1	3	3	
7	Billy Middleton	1368	−384	8	0	3	7	
8	Gary Myers	1356	−396	9	0	5	6	
9	Kenny Minter	1344	−408	10	0	1	5	
10	Tim Arre	1330	−422	8	2	5	6	

==== 1996 season ====
The 1996 season held twelve races. The season began on March 30 at Summerville Speedway, and ended at Caraway Speedway on October 27. Gary Myers avenged a heartbreaking loss in the 1995 Summerville race to claim victory in the 1996 season opener at Summerville. Frank Fleming won the final S.M.A.R.T. event at North Wilkesboro Speedway on September 14. There were five different winners during the season. Frank Fleming and Junior Miller tied for the most victories, with four each. Gary Myers won the season championship by just ten points over runner-up Frank Fleming, and by 74 points over third place finisher Jay Foley. Myers's car owner, 1989 champion Phillip Smith, had retired from regular competition in 1995 to become a car owner.

#	Event	Date	Track	Pole-winner	Winner
1		March 30, 1996	Summerville Speedway (Summerville, SC)		Gary Myers
2	Lowe's 150	April 13, 1996	North Wilkesboro Speedway (North Wilkesboro, NC)	Roger Hill	Junior Miller
3		April 13, 1996	Caraway Speedway (Asheboro, NC)	Roger Hill	Bobby Hutchens
4		April 20, 1996	Franklin County Speedway (Callaway, VA)	Frank Fleming	Frank Fleming
5		July 4, 1996	Franklin County Speedway (Callaway, VA)		Roger Hill
6		July 5, 1996	Tri-County Motor Speedway (Hudson, NC)		Frank Fleming
7		July 6, 1996	Caraway Speedway (Asheboro, NC)		Junior Miller
8		August 31, 1996	Myrtle Beach Speedway (Myrtle Beach, SC)		Junior Miller
9		September 7, 1996	Caraway Speedway (Asheboro, NC)		Frank Fleming
10		September 14, 1996	North Wilkesboro Speedway (North Wilkesboro, NC)		Frank Fleming
11		September 19, 1996	Franklin County Speedway (Callaway, VA)	Junior Miller	Gary Myers
12		October 27, 1996	Caraway Speedway (Asheboro, NC)	Junior Miller	Junior Miller

==== 1997 season ====
The 1997 season only held five races, four of which were at Caraway Speedway. The July 4th event at Tri-County Motor Speedway was the season opener, after rain canceled the April 12th scheduled season opener at Caraway Speedway. The season ended at Caraway Speedway on September 27. Jay Foley became the only driver other than Junior Miller to win a S.M.A.R.T. Modified race in 1997, winning the prestigious Myrtle Beach event on August 30. Miller won by making a decisive pass of Frank Fleming on the 121st lap at the September 6th race. At the season finale to the abbreviated season, Junior Miller went four-for-five, winning both the finale and the championship title. Miller was under severe pressure from Frank Fleming late in the race, but Fleming hit the wall late, setting up a three-lap dash for the checkered. This was Miller's fourth championship in the series.

#	Event	Date	Track	Pole-winner	Winner
1		July 4, 1997	Tri-County Motor Speedway (Hudson, NC)		Junior Miller
2		July 5, 1997	Caraway Speedway (Asheboro, NC)		Junior Miller
3		August 30, 1997	Caraway Speedway (Asheboro, NC)		Jay Foley
4		September 6, 1997	Caraway Speedway (Asheboro, NC)		Junior Miller
5		September 27, 1997	Caraway Speedway (Asheboro, NC)		Junior Miller

==== 1998 season ====
The 1998 season, the tenth season of the series, had an increase of events, to nine races. The season began on April 11 at Caraway Speedway, and ended at Caraway Speedway on October 11. Frank Fleming made it a season sweep at Tri-County Motor Speedway on September 19, by holding off Burt Myers. In the season finale, Jay Hedgecock won the race but it was Junior Miller who was crowned the 1998 champion. There were five different winners during the season. Miller won the most victories, with three. This was Miller's second straight year, and fifth time in series history, that he had won the championship.

#	Event	Date	Track	Pole-winner	Winner
1		April 11, 1998	Caraway Speedway (Asheboro, NC)	Junior Miller	Randy Butner
2		July 2, 1998	Concord Motorsport Park (Concord, NC)		Jay Hedgecock
3		July 3, 1998	Tri-County Motor Speedway (Hudson, NC)		Frank Fleming
4		July 4, 1998	Caraway Speedway (Asheboro, NC)		Junior Miller
5		August 29, 1998	Summerville Speedway (Summerville, SC)		Junior Miller
6		September 5, 1998	Myrtle Beach Speedway (Myrtle Beach, SC)		Junior Miller
7		September 19, 1998	Tri-County Motor Speedway (Hudson, NC)		Frank Fleming
8		September 26, 1998	Caraway Speedway (Asheboro, NC)		Gary Myers
9		October 11, 1998	Caraway Speedway (Asheboro, NC)		Jay Hedgecock

==== 1999 season ====
The 1999 season held thirteen races. The season began on March 27 at Summerville Speedway, and ended at Caraway Speedway on November 1. Frank Fleming claimed the season opener victory by holding off Junior Miller. Burt Myers won his first series race on September 4 at Myrtle Beach Speedway. Miller dominated the B-99 500, leading all 150 laps en route to victory over Jay Foley and points rival Gary Myers. Miller left the event 70 points ahead of Myers. Miller continued to dominate the circuit at the next event, rolling to his third consecutive victory. At the Kenny Minter Memorial 150, Jay Hedgecock won his second race of the year. Meanwhile, Miller headed into the championship finale with a 73-point cushion on Myers in the battle for the title. Hedgecock ended the year with his second consecutive victory, holding off pole winner Frank Fleming. Despite only finishing twelfth, Miller claimed the championship. There were six different winners during the season. Miller again won the most events with four wins during the season. The 1999 season Championship was Miller's third straight championship and the sixth of his career.

No.	Event	Date	Track	Pole-winner	Winner
1		March 27, 1999	Summerville Speedway (Summerville, SC)		Frank Fleming
2		April 3, 1999	Caraway Speedway (Asheboro, NC)		Gary Myers
3		April 10, 1999	Lonesome Pine International Raceway (Coeburn, VA)	Jay Hedgecock	Frank Fleming
4	Triad Clean Sweep 150	April 17, 1999	Caraway Speedway (Asheboro, NC)		Junior Miller
5		July 1, 1999	Concord Motorsport Park (Concord, NC)		Jay Hedgecock
6		July 3, 1999	Caraway Speedway (Asheboro, NC)		Gary Myers
7		July 16, 1999	Tri-County Motor Speedway (Hudson, NC)		Bobby Hutchens
8		September 4, 1999	Myrtle Beach Speedway (Myrtle Beach, SC)		Burt Myers
9		September 11, 1999	Caraway Speedway (Asheboro, NC)	Frank Fleming	Junior Miller
10	B-99 500	September 18, 1999	Franklin County Speedway (Callaway, VA)		Junior Miller
11		September 25, 1999	Caraway Speedway (Asheboro, NC)		Junior Miller
12	Kenny Minter Memorial 150	October 16, 1999	Caraway Speedway (Asheboro, NC)		Jay Hedgecock
13		November 1, 1999	Caraway Speedway (Asheboro, NC)	Frank Fleming	Jay Hedgecock

==== 2000 season ====
The 2000 season held eleven races. The season began on April 1 at Caraway Speedway, and ended at Caraway Speedway on October 29. At the season opener, rising Northern Modified star L. W. Miller claimed victory, holding off Junior Miller. Junior Miller won his first race of the year at the next event, at Coastal Plains Raceway, holding off a young Brian Loftin. Junior Miller won for the fourth time at the September 23rd event, holding off Burt Myers in a thrilling last-lap duel. Northern Modified star Ed Flemke Jr. won his only series race, holding off L. W. Miller at the Advance Auto Parts 150. At the Kenny Minter Memorial 150, Gary Myers won his second race of the season, holding off Frank Fleming. Junior Miller finished third to clinch the season championship with one race yet to go. There were six different divers to win a race during the season. Junior Miller led all drivers, with four wins. Miller won the season championship, making it his fourth straight championship (by 152 points over runner-up Frank Fleming). It was Miller's 7th S.M.A.R.T. championship of his career and the last under the S.M.A.R.T. name.

#	Event	Date	Track	Pole-winner	Winner
1		April 1, 2000	Caraway Speedway (Asheboro, NC)	Frank Fleming	L. W. Miller
2		May 19, 2000	Coastal Plains Raceway (Jacksonville, NC)	Jay Hedgecock	Junior Miller
3		June 30, 2000	Anderson Motor Speedway (Anderson, SC)	Jay Foley	Junior Miller
4		July 1, 2000	Caraway Speedway (Asheboro, NC)	Junior Miller	Jay Foley
5		September 2, 2000	Myrtle Beach Speedway (Myrtle Beach, SC)	Jay Foley	Gary Myers
6		September 9, 2000	Caraway Speedway (Asheboro, NC)	Bobby Hutchens	Junior Miller
7		September 15, 2000	Ace Speedway (Altamahaw, NC)	Junior Miller	Frank Fleming
8		September 23, 2000	Caraway Speedway (Asheboro, NC)	George Brunnhoelzl III	Junior Miller
9	Advance Auto Parts 150	September 29, 2000	Motor Mile Speedway (Radford, VA)	Ed Flemke Jr.	Ed Flemke Jr.
10	Kenny Minter Memorial 150	October 14, 2000	Caraway Speedway (Asheboro, NC)	George Brunnhoelzl III	Gary Myers
11		October 29, 2000	Caraway Speedway (Asheboro, NC)	Frank Fleming	Frank Fleming

===== 2000 top 10 points standings =====
Rank	Driver	Points	Diff	Starts	Wins	T5	T10	Poles
1	Junior Miller	1940		11	4	11	11	2
2	Frank Fleming	1788	−152	11	2	7	9	2
3	Jay Foley	1734	−206	11	1	5	9	2
4	Burt Myers	1675	−265	11	0	6	9	0
5	Earl Baker	1621	−319	11	0	4	7	0
6	Gary Myers	1577	−363	11	2	5	5	0
7	Puddin Swisher	1562	−378	11	0	1	7	0
8	Brian Loftin	1515	−425	11	0	2	6	0
9	Tim Dwiggins	1481	−459	11	0	0	5	0
10	Gene Pack	1456	−484	11	0	1	5	0

==== 2001 season ====
The 2001 season held thirteen races. The season began on April 7 at Caraway Speedway, and ended on November 10 at South Boston Speedway. Jay Foley started the year off by winning the first two events. Junior Miller, who had dominated the second Caraway event but was taken out in a late crash, would claim his first victory of the season at the next event, the Jockey Lot 150, by holding off ]Gary Myers. Doug Wolcott claimed his first series victory, by dominating the last third of the race at Langley Speedway en route to victory over Frank Fleming. At the Alco Yamaha of Asheboro 150, Burt Myers grabbed his first victory of the season in convincing fashion, dominating the second half of the race and holding off his father, Gary Myers. Jay Foley had late issues after leading most of the early part of the race, finishing in thieteenth. At the season closing Bailey's 150, Gary Myers won his second race of the year, passing Ed Flemke Jr. in the final ten laps. Jay Foley finished third to claim his first and only tour championship. Foley beat Burt Myers by 45 points for the championship. There were seven different divers to win a race during the season. Foley won the most events, with four wins. Foley's championship ended Junior Miller's streak of four straight championships.

#	Event	Date	Track	Pole-winner	Winner
1		April 7, 2001	Caraway Speedway (Asheboro, NC)	Gary Myers	Jay Foley
2		April 14, 2001	Caraway Speedway (Asheboro, NC)	Patrick DePonte	Jay Foley
3	Jockey Lot 150	June 15, 2001	Anderson Motor Speedway (Anderson, SC)	Junior Miller	Junior Miller
4		July 4, 2001	Langley Speedway (Hampton, VA)	Patrick DePonte	Doug Wolcott
5		July 6, 2001	Caraway Speedway (Asheboro, NC)	George Brunnhoelzl III	Frank Fleming
6	Myrtle Beach 150	September 1, 2001	Myrtle Beach Speedway (Myrtle Beach, SC)	Junior Miller	Jay Foley
7	Labor Day 150	September 3, 2001	Ace Speedway (Altamahaw, NC)	George Brunnhoelzl III	Gary Myers
8	3M 150	September 8, 2001	Caraway Speedway (Asheboro, NC)	George Brunnhoelzl III	Junior Miller
9	Advance Auto Parts 150	September 15, 2001	New River Valley Speedway (Radford, VA)	George Brunnhoelzl III	Jay Hedgecock
10		September 29, 2001	Caraway Speedway (Asheboro, NC)	George Brunnhoelzl III	Jay Foley
11	Alco Yamaha of Asheboro 150	October 13, 2001	Caraway Speedway (Asheboro, NC)	George Brunnhoelzl III	Burt Myers
12	Mid-Atlantic Championship 500	October 28, 2001	Caraway Speedway (Asheboro, NC)	George Brunnhoelzl Jr.	Burt Myers
13	Bailey's 150	November 10, 2001	South Boston Speedway (South Boston, VA)	Frank Fleming	Gary Myers

===== 2001 top 10 points standings =====
Rank	Driver	Points	Diff	Starts	Wins	T5	T10	Poles
1	Jay Foley	2201		13	4	11	12	0
2	Burt Myers	2156	−45	13	2	9	13	0
3	Gary Myers	1999	−202	13	2	7	9	1
4	Junior Miller	1821	−380	11	2	8	10	2
5	Frank Fleming	1819	−382	12	1	6	9	1
6	George Brunnhoelzl III	1757	−444	13	0	3	8	6
7	Gene Pack	1750	−451	13	0	0	7	0
8	John Smith	1714	−487	13	0	1	6	0
9	Earl Baker	1676	−525	13	0	2	6	0
10	Jason Myers	1615	−586	13	0	1	3	0

==== 2002 season ====
The 2002 season held ten races. The season opener was on April 6 at Summerville Speedway, after a race at Caraway Speedway the previous week was cancelled due to rain. The season ended on October 27 at Caraway Speedway. Burt Myers started the year on top, winning the season opener by holding off Frank Fleming. Bob Park won his only career S.M.A.R.T. race at the next event, the Triad Neat Sweep 150, holding off Burt Myers. Frank Fleming won his 21st & final S.M.A.R.T. race at the September 7th event at Caraway Speedway, holding off Jay Foley. Junior Miller ended the year with three consecutive victories, but Burt Myers would hold on to claim his only S.M.A.R.T. championship, by 86 points over Miller. There were six different winners during the season. Burt Myers and Junior Miller tied for the most wins with three each. Burt Myers joined his father, the 1996 Champion, as the first father-son champions in the series.

#	Event	Date	Track	Pole-winner	Winner
1	Azalea 150	April 6, 2002	Summerville Speedway (Summerville, SC)	Junior Miller	Burt Myers
2	Triad Neat Sweep 150	April 13, 2002	Caraway Speedway (Asheboro, NC)	Ed Flemke Jr.	Bob Park
3	WTKR TV 3 Firecracker 200	July 3, 2002	Langley Speedway (Hampton, VA)	Danny Baker	Doug Wolcott
4		July 5, 2002	Caraway Speedway (Asheboro, NC)	Burt Myers	Jay Hedgecock
5	Pepsi 150	September 2, 2002	Ace Speedway (Altamahaw, NC)	Doug Wolcott	Burt Myers
6		September 7, 2002	Caraway Speedway (Asheboro, NC)	Jay Hedgecock	Frank Fleming
7	Advance Auto Parts 150	September 21, 2002	New River Valley Speedway (Radford, VA)	George Brunnhoelzl III	Burt Myers
8		September 28, 2002	Caraway Speedway (Asheboro, NC)		Junior Miller
9		October 5, 2002	Concord Motorsport Park (Concord, NC)	George Brunnhoelzl III	Junior Miller
10		October 27, 2002	Caraway Speedway (Asheboro, NC)	George Brunnhoelzl III	Junior Miller

===== 2002 top 10 points standings =====
Rank	Driver	Points	Diff	Starts	Wins	T5	T10	Poles
1	Burt Myers	1702		10	3	8	9	1
2	Junior Miller	1616	−86	10	3	5	7	1
3	Jay Foley	1584	−118	10	0	4	10	0
4	Jay Hedgecock	1581	−121	10	1	7	7	1
5	Frank Fleming	1578	−124	10	1	6	7	0
6	Gary Myers	1511	−191	10	0	4	7	0
7	Puddin Swisher	1429	−273	10	0	1	6	0
8	Gene Pack	1385	−317	10	0	1	5	0
9	George Brunnhoelzl III	1343	−359	10	0	3	3	3
10	Jason Myers	1339	−363	10	0	1	4	0

==== 2003 season ====
The American Speed Association became the sanctioning body of the series in 2003, and the tour was renamed the ASA S.M.A.R.T. Tour. The 2003 season was the 15th season of the Tour. There were 10 races were held that season. The season began on March 29 at Caraway Speedway, and ended on October 12 at Friendship Motor Speedway. At the season opener, Jay Hedgecock took home the winner's trophy, dominating the second half of the race while holding off Jeff Fultz. A crash near the end of the race left driver Puddin Swisher injured, and he had to be airlifted from the event. John Smith was the surprise winner of the Summerville 150, holding off L. W. Miller for his only career S.M.A.R.T. era victory. L. W. Miller won an amazing six consecutive victories between April 12 and September 1, a series record for consecutive victories. At the Concord 150, Jay Hedgecock won for the third time of the season, slipping past the dominant car of Gary Myers in the waning laps. Hedgecock also used the win to slash two-thirds off L. W. Miller's points lead as they headed into the season finale. In the season finale, Jay Foley claimed his only victory of the season, holding off L. W. Miller. Miller couldn't be too upset with his efforts, however, as he was crowned S.M.A.R.T. champion for the first time in his career (by just 51 points over two-time champion Jay Hedgecock). There were only five different winners during the season.

#	Event	Date	Track	Pole-winner	Winner
1	Caraway 150	March 29, 2003	Caraway Speedway (Asheboro, NC)	Jay Hedgecock	Jay Hedgecock
2	Summerville 150	April 5, 2003	Summerville Speedway (Summerville, SC)	Burt Myers	John Smith
3	Caraway 150	April 12, 2003	Caraway Speedway (Asheboro, NC)	Jay Foley	L. W. Miller
4	Friendship 150	May 2, 2003	Friendship Motor Speedway (Elkin, NC)	(Rained Out)	L. W. Miller
5	Friendship 150	June 13, 2003	Friendship Motor Speedway (Elkin, NC)	L. W. Miller	L. W. Miller
6	Caraway 150	July 4, 2003	Caraway Speedway (Asheboro, NC)	L. W. Miller	L. W. Miller
7	Myrtle Beach 150	August 30, 2003	Myrtle Beach Speedway (Myrtle Beach, SC)	Junior Miller	L. W. Miller
8	Ace 150	September 1, 2003	Ace Speedway (Altamahaw, NC)	L. W. Miller	L. W. Miller
9	Caraway 150	September 6, 2003	Caraway Speedway (Asheboro, NC)	Jay Hedgecock	Jay Hedgecock
10	Grubbs Marine 150	September 13, 2003	Friendship Motor Speedway (Elkin, NC)	Tim Brown	Burt Myers
11	Concord 150	October 4, 2003	Concord Motorsport Park (Concord, NC)	L. W. Miller	Jay Hedgecock
12	Friendship 500	October 12, 2003	Friendship Motor Speedway (Elkin, NC)	Frank Fleming	Jay Foley

===== 2003 top 10 points standings =====
Rank	Driver	Points	Diff	Starts	Wins	T5	T10	Poles
1	L. W. Miller	2053		12	6	9	10	4
2	Jay Hedgecock	2002	−51	12	3	10	11	2
3	Jay Foley	1953	−100	12	1	8	10	1
4	Junior Miller	1879	−174	12	0	7	10	1
5	Earl Baker	1841	−212	12	0	4	10	0
6	Burt Myers	1835	−218	12	1	6	9	1
7	Gary Myers	1783	−270	12	0	4	8	0
8	Brian Pack	1691	−362	12	0	4	9	0
9	Gene Pack	1690	−363	12	0	1	6	0
10	Frank Fleming	1661	−392	12	0	2	6	1

==== 2004 season ====
The 2004 season held thirteen races. The season began on March 27 at Caraway Speedway, and ended on October 17 at Friendship Motor Speedway. At the season opener, Michael Clifton won his only career series race, holding off Junior Miller in the waning laps. L. W. Miller won his second consecutive race at the Caraway 150 (April 10), moving the dominant car of Jay Hedgecock out of the way on a green-white-checkered. Insult would later be added to injury for Hedgecock, as his car was disqualified for a technical violation discovered in post-race inspection. Hedgecock overcame the disappointment of the previous week, holding off L. W. Miller for the victory in the Caraway 150 (April 17). Burt Myers won his only race of the year at the Friendship 150 (May), holding off his brother Jason. Jay Foley captured a dominating victory at the Friends of Friendship 150, leading all but the first two laps en route to a wide margin of victory over runner-up Burt Myers. At the Caraway 150 (July), L. W. Miller grabbed yet another victory at his favorite track, sneaking into the lead with just a dozen laps to go and holding off Jay Hedgecock for the trophy. Brian Loftin began a hot streak at the ASA/S.M.A.R.T. 150, going on to win four of the final six races of the season. Lofton held off Junior Miller for the victory at historic Myrtle Beach. The race was certainly competitive, as a season-high seven lead changes punctuated the event. Loftin would slip by the dominant Jay Hedgecock with just thirteen laps to go, and never looked back. Ironically, Hedgecock would lose the next race, at Caraway, with the deciding pass on exactly the same lap as at the Caraway 150 (July). Loftin won the Star Country/Old Milwaukee 150 after a green-white-checkered extended the event by ten laps. Northern Modified star Ted Christopher captured his only career series race at the North vs. South Shootout Qualifier, holding off Tim Brown on a green-white-checkered. At the season finale, and ultimately the final race of the S.M.A.R.T. era, Brian Loftin captured the victory by edging out L. W. Miller. However, Miller would beat Loftin by 116 points to win his second straight season championship. There were six different winners during the season. L. W. Miller and Loftin each won four races, tying to lead all drivers in wins.

#	Event	Date	Track	Pole-winner	Winner
1	Caraway 150	March 27, 2004	Caraway Speedway (Asheboro, NC)	(Rained Out)	Michael Clifton
2	Friendship 150	April 4, 2004	Friendship Motor Speedway (Elkin, NC)	L. W. Miller	L. W. Miller
3	Caraway 150	April 10, 2004	Caraway Speedway (Asheboro, NC)	Jay Hedgecock	L. W. Miller
4	Caraway 150	April 17, 2004	Caraway Speedway (Asheboro, NC)	Bobby Hutchens	Jay Hedgecock
5	Friendship 150	May 21, 2004	Friendship Motor Speedway (Elkin, NC)	L. W. Miller	Burt Myers
6	Friends of Friendship 150	June 11, 2004	Friendship Motor Speedway (Elkin, NC)	L. W. Miller	Jay Foley
7	Caraway 150	July 2, 2004	Caraway Speedway (Asheboro, NC)	Burt Myers	L. W. Miller
8	ASA/S.M.A.R.T. 150	September 4, 2004	Myrtle Beach Speedway (Myrtle Beach, SC)	Brian Loftin	Brian Loftin
9	Caraway 150	September 11, 2004	Caraway Speedway (Asheboro, NC)	L. W. Miller	Brian Loftin
10	Caraway 150	September 25, 2004	Caraway Speedway (Asheboro, NC)	Jay Hedgecock	L. W. Miller
11	Star Country/Old Milwaukee 150	October 2, 2004	Motor Mile Speedway (Radford, VA)	Jason Myers	Brian Loftin
12	North vs. South Shootout Qualifier	October 9, 2004	Concord Motorsport Park (Concord, NC)	Jay Foley	Ted Christopher
13	Championship 200	October 17, 2004	Friendship Motor Speedway (Elkin, NC)	L. W. Miller	Brian Loftin

===== 2004 top 10 points standings =====
Rank	Driver	Points	Diff	Starts	Wins	T5	T10	Poles
1	L. W. Miller	2105		13	4	10	12	4
2	Brian Loftin	1989	−116	13	4	9	9	1
3	Junior Miller	1973	−132	13	0	8	11	0
4	John Smith	1932	−173	13	0	6	11	0
5	Burt Myers	1885	−220	13	1	6	11	1
6	Frank Fleming	1842	−263	13	0	3	10	0
7	Jay Foley	1830	−275	13	2	5	7	0
8	Earl Baker	1828	−277	13	0	4	9	0
9	Brian Pack	1801	−304	13	0	2	9	0
10	Jay Hedgecock	1579	−325	12	1	5	7	2

In late 2004, NASCAR announced it was taking over the S.M.A.R.T. Tour and bringing it under the NASCAR banner.

=== NASCAR Tour era ===
The NASCAR Whelen Southern Modified Tour was established in 2005, taking over what had formerly been the Southern Modified Auto Racing Tour (SMART) after the collapse of the organization as part of the breakup of the American Speed Association in late 2004. Whelen Industries, who sponsors the NASCAR Whelen Modified Tour agreed to sponsor the Southern Tour series, which became the Whelen Southern Modified Tour.

==== 2005 season ====
The inaugural NASCAR era season held twelve events, beginning on March 26 at Caraway Speedway and ended on October 29 at Ace Speedway. The inaugural event for the NASCAR Whelen Southern Modified Tour was the Southern Modified Tour 150 at Caraway Speedway on March 26. Burt Myers won the first pole for the NASCAR era of the southern-based Modified Tour. While leading the event Jay Hedgecock had to pulled his car into the pits on the 65th lap with an engine problem. Ted Christopher, a star driver on the northeastern-based NASCAR Whelen Modified Tour, inherited the lead from Hedgecock and paced the field for the remaining laps on his way to the victory. In the April 16 race at Caraway, the tour's 3rd race under NASCAR sanction, Burt Myers led the first 145 laps but fellow rival Junior Miller stayed on his back bumper for most of the race. Miller and Myers bumped and banged and racing each other hard lap after lap. Miller made the pass for the lead on Myers with only 5 laps remaining to score the victory. At the July 1 event at Caraway Bud Pole winner Jay Hedgecock was on point. Hedgecock had lapping all but the top eight cars, but Brian Crammer was coming as he had worked his way from his eleventh place starting spot to 2nd by the halfway point. Crammer had been chasing down Hedgecock during the second half and caught Hedgecock with twenty laps to go. Crammer began putting hard pressure on Hedgecock with ten to go and with five to go made a move on Hedgecock coming off of turn two. Hedgecock and Crammer bumped wheels resulting in Crammer being sent spinning while Hedgecock kept the lead. Crammer retaliated under the caution by hitting Hedgecock's car but Hedgecock was able to continue. A crash during the green-white-checker attempt sent the race over its scheduled distance. Hedgecock's car ran out of gas before the race was red flagged during track clean up. Brian Loftin inherited the lead for the next another green-white-checkered attempt and held off Tim Brown for the win. Burt Myers was the fastest in qualifying for the Advance Auto Parts 199 at Bowman Gray Stadium, but drew the fifth starting position. This was the tour's first visit to Bowman Gray Stadium, the track many tour drivers call home, since 1992. Hedgecock led the first 71 laps until a spinning car hit the infield and shot dirt onto the track coming out of the fourth turn. Hedgecock's car skidded in the dirt and careened into the outside guardrail as Tim Brown zipped past into the lead. Brown stayed there until the lap 137 when Myers squeezed inside and completed a pass. Myers held off the win-hungry Brown in the end. The Made in America Whelen 300 at Martinsville Speedway was a combination race for both Modified Tours. The event was the first NASCAR Modified Tour event held at the track since 2002 and the first night race held at the historic .526-mile track. Ted Christopher won the overall event as Brian Loftin was the top-finishing driver from the Southern Tour, finishing twelfth, but credited as first-place towards the Southern Modified Tour. A special Twin 100-lap event was held at Ace Speedway as a Labor Day doubleheader. Burt Myers won the first 100-lap race while Junior Miller got the win in the second 100-lap race. Jay Hedgecock won his fourth Pole of the season at the sixth and final season visit to Caraway Speedway. Hedgecock lead 115 of the first 133 laps and looked to be closing in on his first win of the season. Hedgecock's season of bad luck continued as during a caution period on lap 134, Hedgecock came into the pits with engine trouble ending his night. Brian Loftin held off a hard-charging Junior Miller over the final laps to win. Jay Hedgecock finally avoided any bad luck at the season finale, Whelen 150, at Ace Speedway. Hedgecock lead all 150 lap and won easily over second place Loftin. Junior Miller, by finishing eighth, won the inaugural NASCAR Whelen Southern Modified Tour Championship. There were five different winners during the season with Brian Loftin winning the most with 4. Junior Miller was voted the most popular driver during the season.

#	Event	Date	Track	Pole-winner	Winner
1	Southern Modified 150	March 26, 2005	Caraway Speedway (Asheboro, NC)	Burt Myers	Ted Christopher
2	Southern Modified Tour 150	April 9, 2005	Caraway Speedway (Asheboro, NC)	Jay Hedgecock	Burt Myers
3	Southern Modified Tour 150	April 16, 2005	Caraway Speedway (Asheboro, NC)	Jay Hedgecock	Junior Miller
4	Southern Modified Tour 150	July 1, 2005	Caraway Speedway (Asheboro, NC)	Jay Hedgecock	Brian Loftin
5	Advance Auto Parts 199	August 6, 2005	Bowman Gray Stadium (Winston-Salem, NC)	Burt Myers	Burt Myers
6	Made In America Whelen 300	September 3, 2005	Martinsville Speedway (Ridgeway, VA)	Brian Loftin*	Brian Loftin*
7	DMC Auto Exchange 100	September 5, 2005	Ace Speedway (Altamahaw, NC)	Burt Myers	Burt Myers
8	Crown Truck N Stuff 100	September 5, 2005	Ace Speedway (Altamahaw, NC)	(Random Draw)	Junior Miller
9	Southern Modified Tour 150	September 10, 2005	Caraway Speedway (Asheboro, NC)	Junior Miller	Junior Miller
10	Southern Modified Tour 150	September 24, 2005	Caraway Speedway (Asheboro, NC)	Jay Hedgecock	Brian Loftin
11	Adams Construction Star Country 150	October 1, 2005	Motor Mile Speedway (Radford, VA)	Brian Loftin	Brian Loftin
12	Whelen 150	October 29, 2005	Ace Speedway (Altamahaw, NC)	Michael Clifton	Jay Hedgecock

* Martinsville WMT and WSMT combo race. Highest finishing WSMT driver credited a win.

===== 2005 Top 10 points standings =====
Rank	Driver	Points	Diff	Starts	Wins	T5	T10	Poles
1	Junior Miller	1904		12	3	7	11	1
2	Burt Myers	1872	−32	12	3	7	9	3
3	Brian Loftin	1844	−60	12	4	8	9	2
4	Tim Brown	1752	−152	11	0	6	8	0
5	Michael Clifton	1740	−164	12	0	6	9	1
6	Jay Hedgecock	1680	−224	12	1	4	7	4
7	Jay Foley	1669	−235	12	0	3	7	0
8	Frank Fleming	1655	−249	12	0	3	8	0
9	Brian Pack	1585	−319	12	0	2	7	0
10	Bobby Hutchens	1579	−325	12	0	1	5	0

==== 2006 season ====
The 2006 season held thirteenth events, beginning on March 25 at Caraway Speedway and ended on October 21 at Southern National Motorsports Park. Northern tour driver Ted Christopher won the season opener at Caraway for the second year in a row. Junior Miller would win the next two races before L. W. Miller won the forth race of the season at Motor Mile Speedway. It was L. W. Miller's first win in the series under the NASCAR banner. Junior Miller won his third win of the year at the next event. At the Bowman Gray event Burt Myers won the pole and started fourth after an inversion, but crashed on the second lap of the race dropping him from contention. Lee Jeffreys led the first 157 laps before dropping out with brake issues opening the door for Burt's brother, Jason Myers, to take over the lead. Jason Myers would lead the final 42 laps to win his first Southern Modified Tour event. Tim Brown would claim the southern tour win in the Martinsville combo race. Rookie Brian King won his first tour race at Ace Speedway on August 15. in the season final race at Southern National Junior Miller won the race and his second straight championship by 6 points over Brown. There were six different winners during the season with Junior Miller winning the most with six. Junior Miller also was voted the most popular driver for the second straight year. Brian King was the Rookie of the Year.

#	Event	Date	Track	Pole-winner	Winner
1	Southern Modified Tour 150	March 25, 2006	Caraway Speedway (Asheboro, NC)	Burt Myers	Ted Christopher
2	Kevin Whitaker Chevrolet 150	April 8, 2006	Greenville-Pickens Speedway (Greenville, SC)	(Rained Out)	Junior Miller
3	Southern Modified Tour 150	April 15, 2006	Caraway Speedway (Asheboro, NC)	Brian Loftin	Junior Miller
4	94.9 Star Country 200	April 23, 2006	Motor Mile Speedway (Radford, VA)	Brian Loftin	L. W. Miller
5	Southern Modified Tour 150	June 30, 2006	Caraway Speedway (Asheboro, NC)	Brian Loftin	Junior Miller
6	Advance Auto Parts 199	August 5, 2006	Bowman Gray Stadium (Winston-Salem, NC)	Burt Myers	Jason Myers
7	Made In America Whelen 300	September 2, 2006	Martinsville Speedway (Ridgeway, VA)	Tim Brown*	Tim Brown*
8	Southern Modified Tour 150	September 9, 2006	Caraway Speedway (Asheboro, NC)	Tim Brown	Junior Miller
9	Southern Modified Tour 150	September 15, 2006	Ace Speedway (Altamahaw, NC)	Tim Brown	Brian King
10	Southern Modified Tour 150	September 23, 2006	Caraway Speedway (Asheboro, NC)	Tim Brown	L. W. Miller
11	Hickory 150	September 30, 2006	Hickory Motor Speedway (Hickory, NC)	Burt Myers	Junior Miller
12	Star Country 94.9 / Adams Construction 150	October 14, 2006	Motor Mile Speedway (Radford, VA)	Burt Myers	L. W. Miller
13	Night of the Modifieds 100	October 21, 2006	Southern National Motorsports Park (Kenly, NC)	L. W. Miller	Junior Miller

- Martinsville WMT & WSMT combo race. Highest finishing WSMT driver credited a win.

===== 2006 top 10 points standings =====
Rank	Driver	Points	Diff	Starts	Wins	T5	T10	Poles
1	Junior Miller	2098		13	6	9	11	0
2	Tim Brown	2092	−6	13	1	10	13	4
3	L. W. Miller	1924	−174	12	3	9	11	1
4	Burt Myers	1913	−185	13	0	7	11	4
5	Brian King	1824	−274	13	1	4	9	0
6	Jason Myers	1788	−310	12	1	2	9	0
7	Brian Pack	1778	−320	12	0	3	8	0
8	Bobby Hutchens	1760	−338	13	0	3	7	0
9	Gene Pack	1705	−393	13	0	1	6	0
10	Frank Fleming	1534	−564	12	0	2	6	0

==== 2007 season ====
The 2007 season had twelve events, beginning on March 24 at Caraway Speedway and ended on October 6 also at Caraway Speedway. L. W. Miller won the season opener. At the second event of the year Andy Seuss won his first tour win and the first Southern Modified Tour event at the Music City Motorplex (Nashville Speedway). At the Bowman Gray event after a crash took out Frank Fleming, who had led the first 194 laps, Burt Myers passed John Smith on the last lap to pick up his only Southern Mod victory of the season. It was Myers' first victory on the tour in over a year. L. W. Miller won the championship over Tim Brown by 25 points. There were six different winners in the season with L. W. Miller winning the most with five victories. L. W. Miller also was the most popular driver for the season and Wesley Swartout was the Rookie of the Year.

#	Event	Date	Track	Pole-winner	Winner
1	Southern Modified Tour 150	March 24, 2007	Caraway Speedway (Asheboro, NC)	Burt Myers	L. W. Miller
2	Whelen 150	April 1, 2007	Nashville Speedway (Nashville, TN)	Burt Myers	Andy Seuss
3	American Revolution 150	April 7, 2007	Greenville-Pickens Speedway (Greenville, SC)	Burt Myers	Junior Miller
4	Night of the Southern Modifieds 150	April 21, 2007	Caraway Speedway (Asheboro, NC)	Burt Myers	L. W. Miller
5	Southern Modified Tour 150	July 7, 2007	Caraway Speedway (Asheboro, NC)	Burt Myers	L. W. Miller
6	Advance Auto Parts 199	August 4, 2007	Bowman Gray Stadium (Winston-Salem, NC)	Tim Brown	Burt Myers
7	Made In America Whelen 300	September 1, 2007	Martinsville Speedway (Ridgeway, VA)	Brian Loftin*	L. W. Miller*
8	DMC Auto Exchange 150	September 3, 2007	Ace Speedway (Altamahaw, NC)	Tim Brown	Tim Brown
9	Southern Modified Tour 150	September 8, 2007	Caraway Speedway (Asheboro, NC)	Burt Myers	L. W. Miller
10	Southern National Raceway Park 150	September 15, 2007	Southern National Motorsports Park (Kenly, NC)	Frank Fleming	Tim Brown
11	Southern Modified Tour 150	September 22, 2007	Caraway Speedway (Asheboro, NC)	Brian Loftin	Brian Loftin
12	Southern Modified Tour 150	October 6, 2007	Caraway Speedway (Asheboro, NC)	Brian Loftin	Brian Loftin

- Martinsville WMT & WSMT combo race. Highest finishing WSMT driver credited a win.

===== 2007 top 10 points standings =====
Rank	Driver	Points	Diff	Starts	Wins	T5	T10	Poles
1	L. W. Miller	1930		12	5	9	11	0
2	Tim Brown	1905	−25	12	2	8	11	2
3	Burt Myers	1798	−132	12	1	5	10	6
4	Junior Miller	1766	−164	12	1	6	9	0
5	Brian King	1718	−212	12	0	4	10	0
6	Jason Myers	1694	−236	12	0	3	8	0
7	Frank Fleming	1692	−238	12	0	6	7	1
8	George Brunnhoelzl III	1609	−321	12	0	1	7	0
9	Brian Pack	1593	−337	12	0	3	6	0
10	Gene Pack	1475	−455	11	0	0	3	0

==== 2008 season ====
The 2008 season had eleven events, beginning on March 22 at Caraway Speedway and ended on October 4 at Caraway Speedway. L. W. Miller opened the season by winning the first two events before Brian Loftin won the next three events. At the next event at Lanier Speedway, the series' first race there, George Brunnhoelzl III won his first tour victory. Burt Myers scores his lone tour race of the season at Southern National Raceway Park. Loftin won the championship by 30 points over Tim Brown. It was Brown's third straight season finishing runner-up in points to three different champions. There were six different winners in the season with Loftin's four victories leading the tour. Bobby Hutchens was the most popular driver for the season and Buddy Emory was the Rookie of the Year.

#	Event	Date	Track	Pole-winner	Winner
1	Southern Modified Tour 150	March 22, 2008	Caraway Speedway (Asheboro, NC)	Tim Brown	L. W. Miller
2	Southern Modified Tour 150	April 11, 2008	Ace Speedway (Altamahaw, NC)	L. W. Miller	L. W. Miller
3	Southern Modified Tour 150	April 12, 2008	Caraway Speedway (Asheboro, NC)	Burt Myers	Brian Loftin
4	Advance Auto Parts 199	August 2, 2008	Bowman Gray Stadium (Winston-Salem, NC)	Burt Myers	Brian Loftin
5	Southern Modified Tour 150	August 22, 2008	Caraway Speedway (Asheboro, NC)	Andy Seuss	Brian Loftin
6	Lanier 150	August 30, 2008	Lanier Speedway (Gainesville GA)	George Brunnhoelzl III	George Brunnhoelzl III
7	Whelen 150	September 6, 2008	Caraway Speedway (Asheboro, NC)	Burt Myers	Tim Brown
8	Night of the Modifieds 150	September 13, 2008	Southern National Motorsports Park (Kenly, NC)	L. W. Miller	Burt Myers
9	Made In America Whelen 300	September 20, 2008	Martinsville Speedway (Ridgeway, VA)	George Brunnhoelzl III	Brian Loftin*
10	Southern Modified Tour 150	September 27, 2008	Caraway Speedway (Asheboro, NC)	Tim Brown	Tim Brown
11	Whelen 150	October 4, 2008	Caraway Speedway (Asheboro, NC)	Tim Brown	Andy Seuss

- Martinsville WMT & WSMT combo race. Highest finishing WSMT driver credited a win.

===== 2008 top 10 points standings =====
Rank	Driver	Points	Diff	Starts	Wins	T5	T10	Poles
1	Brian Loftin	1780		11	4	9	9	0
2	Tim Brown	1750	−30	11	2	8	10	3
3	L. W. Miller	1698	−82	11	2	5	10	2
4	Andy Seuss	1617	−163	11	1	6	9	1
5	Jason Myers	1562	−218	11	0	3	8	0
6	Frank Fleming	1552	−228	11	0	3	9	0
7	George Brunnhoelzl III	1540	−240	11	1	6	7	2
8	John Smith	1398	−382	11	0	0	5	0
9	Burt Myers	1355	−425	9	1	6	7	3
10	Rich Kuiken Jr.	1256	−524	10	0	1	1	0

==== 2009 season ====
The 2009 season had fourteenth events, beginning on March 21 at Concord Motorsport Park and ended on October 24 at Caraway Speedway. Ted Christopher won the season opener. Christopher and Andy Seuss would alternate victories in the first four events. George Brunnhoelzl III won his first race of the season in the fifth event of the season at Caraway Speedway. At the Advance Auto Parts 199 at Bowman Gray, Brunnhoelzl III and John Smith would trade the lead back and forth for most of the race. Smith lead 105 laps and Brunnhoelzl 60 laps with Burt Myers the only other driver to lead a lap until a crash on lap 167 took out most of the cars remaining in the race. L. W. Miller made it back to the line first to lead a lap after the accident but was forced to immediately make a pit stop for the damage his had from the wreck. Luke Fleming who was making his Tour debut driving in his father's car, avoided the crash and took over the race with 32 laps to go. Fleming would lead the rest of the event to claim the upset victory in his only start of the season. Brunnhoelzl who had major suspension damage from the big crash would finish second. Only eight cars were running at the finish, only three on the lead lap. Gene Pack finished third, L. W. Miller was fourth (two laps down), and Bryan Dauzat was fifth (seven laps down). Brunnhoelzl III won the last two races and the championship. There were six different winners in the season with Brunnhoelzl's five victories the most on the tour. Andy Seuss was the most popular driver for the season. No Rookie of the Year award was given out as no rookies ran for the award.

#	Event	Date	Track	Pole-winner	Winner
1	Capitol Bank 150	March 21, 2009	Concord Motorsport Park (Concord, NC)	Burt Myers	Ted Christopher
2	Southern Modified Tour 150	April 4, 2009	South Boston Speedway (South Boston, VA)	George Brunnhoelzl III	Andy Seuss
3	Caraway Speedway 150	April 11, 2009	Caraway Speedway (Asheboro, NC)	George Brunnhoelzl III	Ted Christopher
4	Lanier 150	April 18, 2009	Lanier Speedway (Gainesville GA)	George Brunnhoelzl III	Andy Seuss
5	Firecracker 150	July 3, 2009	Caraway Speedway (Asheboro, NC)	Andy Seuss	George Brunnhoelzl III
6	Advance Auto Parts 199	August 1, 2009	Bowman Gray Stadium (Winston-Salem, NC)	Brian Loftin	Luke Fleming
7	UNOH Perfect Storm 150	August 19, 2009	Bristol Motor Speedway (Bristol, TN)	(Rain Out)	George Brunnhoelzl III*
8	Caraway 150	August 29, 2009	Caraway Speedway (Asheboro, NC)	George Brunnhoelzl III	Brian Loftin
9	Myrtle Beach 150	September 5, 2009	Myrtle Beach Speedway (Myrtle Beach, SC)	George Brunnhoelzl III	Andy Seuss
10	Caraway 150	September 12, 2009	Caraway Speedway (Asheboro, NC)	Burt Myers	George Brunnhoelzl III
11	Caraway Classic 150	September 19, 2009	Caraway Speedway (Asheboro, NC)	Burt Myers	Andy Seuss
12	Made In America Whelen 300	September 27, 2009	Martinsville Speedway (Ridgeway, VA)	Brian Loftin*	Burt Myers*
13	Lightning Fast 150	October 4, 2008	Ace Speedway (Altamahaw, NC)	Burt Myers	George Brunnhoelzl III
14	Fall Classic 150	October 24, 2009	Caraway Speedway (Asheboro, NC)	George Brunnhoelzl III	George Brunnhoelzl III

- Martinsville & Bristol WMT & WSMT combo races. Highest finishing WSMT driver credited a win.

===== 2009 top 10 points standings =====
Rank	Driver	Points	Diff	Starts	Wins	T5	T10	Poles
1	George Brunnhoelzl III	2385		14	5	13	13	6
2	Andy Seuss	2205	−180	14	4	10	11	1
3	Burt Myers	2138	−247	14	1	8	12	4
4	Brian Loftin	2090	−295	14	1	7	12	2
5	Frank Fleming	2044	−341	14	0	5	11	0
6	Jason Myers	2016	−369	14	0	6	11	0
7	John Smith	1823	−562	13	0	3	9	0
8	Gene Pack	1762	−623	13	0	2	7	0
9	Buddy Emory	1602	−783	12	0	1	7	0
10	L. W. Miller	1457	−928	10	0	5	7	0

==== 2010 season ====
The 2010 season had 10 events, beginning on March 5 at Atlanta Motor Speedway's infield oval track and ended on October 14 at Charlotte Motor Speedway's infield oval track. Corey LaJoie, son of two-time Nationwide Series Champion Randy LaJoie, passed Tim Brown with six laps to go and won his first win in his first start in the Series. Five different drivers won the first five races of the season. In the ninth event of the season at Tri-County Motor Speedway, Burt Myers made a dive-bomb pass against the infield wall down the backstretch on leader John Smith that stuck and won Myers his first victory of the season. In the season ending race, James Civali came into the event with the points lead but during the race was parked by NASCAR officials for an incident involving him retaliated at L. W. Miller while the race was under cation laps. Burt Myers had a dominant race, leading all but one lap, to win his second victory in a row. The victory moved Myers from fourth in points to win the title by 31 points over L. W. Miller. There were seven different winners in the ten race season with Burt Myers, James Civali and Andy Seuss each winning two races as the most on the tour. Burt Myers was the most popular driver for the season and Greg Butcher was the Rookie of the Year.

#	Event	Date	Track	Pole-winner	Winner
1	Atlanta 150	March 5, 2010	Atlanta Motor Speedway (Hampton, GA)	James Civali	Corey LaJoie
2	Spring Classic 150	March 14, 2010	Caraway Speedway (Asheboro, NC)	Burt Myers	Andy Seuss
3	South Boston 150	April 3, 2010	South Boston Speedway (South Boston, VA)	Zach Brewer	James Civali
4	Firecracker 150	July 2, 2010	Caraway Speedway (Asheboro, NC)	Burt Myers	John Smith
5	Strutmasters.com 199	August 7, 2010	Bowman Gray Stadium (Winston-Salem, NC)	Zach Brewer	L. W. Miller
6	UNOH Perfect Storm	August 18, 2010	Bristol Motor Speedway (Bristol, TN)	James Civali*	James Civali*
7	Triad Commercial Property Services 150	August 28, 2010	Caraway Speedway (Asheboro, NC)	Andy Seuss	Andy Seuss
8	Visit Hampton 150	September 4, 2010	Langley Speedway (Hampton, VA)	James Civali	Tim Brown
9	Tri-County 150	September 25, 2010	Tri-County Motor Speedway (Hudson, NC)	George Brunnhoelzl III	Burt Myers
10	UNOH Southern Slam 150	October 14, 2010	Charlotte Motor Speedway (Concord, NC)	Andy Seuss	Burt Myers

- Bristol WMT & WSMT combo races. Highest finishing WSMT driver credited a win.

===== 2010 top 10 points standings =====
Rank	Driver	Points	Diff	Starts	Wins	T5	T10	Poles
1	Burt Myers	1609		10	2	7	9	2
2	L. W. Miller	1578	−31	10	1	5	9	0
3	James Civali	1575	−34	10	2	6	8	3
4	Andy Seuss	1566	−43	10	2	6	8	2
5	John Smith	1555	−54	10	1	6	9	0
6	Zach Brewer	1429	−180	10	0	4	7	2
7	Jason Myers	1427	−182	10	0	3	7	0
8	Frank Fleming	1365	−244	10	0	2	5	0
9	Brandon Hire	1354	−255	10	0	2	5	0
10	Gene Pack	1293	−316	10	0	0	5	0

==== 2011 season ====
#	Event	Date	Track	Pole-winner	Winner
1	Spring Classic 150	March 13, 2011	Caraway Speedway (Asheboro, NC)	Brian Loftin	George Brunnhoelzl III
2	Hickory 150	April 2, 2011	Hickory Motor Speedway (Hickory, NC)	Patrick Emerling	George Brunnhoelzl III
3	South Boston 150	April 17, 2011	South Boston Speedway (South Boston, VA)	(Rained Out)	Ted Christopher
4	Caraway 150	April 23, 2011	Caraway Speedway (Asheboro, NC)	George Brunnhoelzl III	Ted Christopher
5	Firecracker 150	July 1, 2011	Caraway Speedway (Asheboro, NC)	Brian Loftin	L. W. Miller
6	Strutmasters.com 199	August 6, 2011	Bowman Gray Stadium (Winston-Salem, NC)	George Brunnhoelzl III	L. W. Miller
7	UNOH Perfect Storm 150	August 24, 2011	Bristol Motor Speedway (Bristol, TN)	Tim Brown*	Frank Fleming*
8	Caraway 150	August 26, 2011	Caraway Speedway (Asheboro, NC)	Andy Seuss	Andy Seuss
9	Newport News Shipbuilding 150	September 3, 2011	Langley Speedway (Hampton, VA)	Burt Myers	Andy Seuss
10	Southern Thompson 125	September 11, 2011	Thompson Speedway (Thompson, CT)	Andy Seuss	George Brunnhoelzl III
11	Tri-County 150	September 24, 2011	Tri-County Motor Speedway (Hudson, NC)	George Brunnhoelzl III	George Brunnhoelzl III
12	Caraway 150	October 1, 2011	Caraway Speedway (Asheboro, NC)	George Brunnhoelzl III	Andy Seuss
13	UNOH Southern Slam 150	October 13, 2011	Charlotte Motor Speedway (Concord, NC)	George Brunnhoelzl III	Tim Brown
14	Caraway 150	October 22, 2011	Caraway Speedway (Asheboro, NC)	Andy Seuss	George Brunnhoelzl III

- Bristol WMT & WSMT combo races. Highest finishing WSMT driver credited a win.

===== 2011 top 10 points standings =====
Rank	Driver	Points	Diff	Starts	Wins	T5	T10	Poles
1	George Brunnhoelzl III	2411		14	5	12	14	5
2	Andy Seuss	2231	−180	14	3	9	12	3
3	Jason Myers	2103	−308	14	0	6	12	0
4	Tim Brown	2067	−344	13	1	5	11	1
5	John Smith	2043	−368	14	0	7	9	0
6	Frank Fleming	1988	−423	14	1	3	9	0
7	L. W. Miller	1984	−427	14	2	3	9	0
8	Austin Pack	1875	−536	13	0	1	9	0
9	Burt Myers	1854	−557	12	0	7	11	1
10	Thomas Stinson	1570	−841	10	0	4	8	0

==== 2012 season ====
#	Event	Date	Track	Pole-winner	Winner
1	Spring Classic 150	March 31, 2012	Caraway Speedway (Asheboro, NC)	George Brunnhoelzl III	George Brunnhoelzl III
2	Farm Bureau Insurance 150	April 7, 2012	Caraway Speedway (Asheboro, NC)	Tim Brown	Brian Loftin
3	South Boston 150	April 14, 2012	South Boston Speedway (South Boston, VA)	L. W. Miller	Brandon Ward
4	Parking Lot Maintenance Headquarters 150	April 21, 2012	Caraway Speedway (Asheboro, NC)	George Brunnhoelzl III	George Brunnhoelzl III
5	Firecracker 150	July 6, 2012	Caraway Speedway (Asheboro, NC)	George Brunnhoelzl III	George Brunnhoelzl III
6	Strutmasters.com 199	August 4, 2012	Bowman Gray Stadium (Winston-Salem, NC)	Burt Myers	George Brunnhoelzl III
7	UNOH Perfect Storm 150	August 22, 2012	Bristol Motor Speedway (Bristol, TN)	Ryan Newman*	George Brunnhoelzl III*
8	Newport News Shipbuilding 150	September 1, 2012	Langley Speedway (Hampton, VA)	Danny Bohn	Jason Myers
9	GreenPointe Energy 75	September 9, 2012	Thompson Speedway (Thompson, CT)	Rob Fuller	Andy Seuss
10	Mid-Atlantic Shoot Out 150	October 6, 2012	Caraway Speedway (Asheboro, NC)	George Brunnhoelzl III	Danny Bohn
11	UNOH Southern Slam 150	October 11, 2012	Charlotte Motor Speedway (Concord, NC)	George Brunnhoelzl III	George Brunnhoelzl III

- Bristol WMT & WSMT combo races. Highest finishing WSMT driver credited a win.

===== 2012 top 10 points standings =====
Rank	Driver	Points	Diff	Starts	Wins	T5	T10	Poles
1	George Brunnhoelzl III	468		11	6	6	11	5
2	Danny Bohn	415	−53	11	1	6	8	1
3	Jason Myers	412	−56	11	1	6	9	0
4	Tim Brown	393	−75	11	0	5	6	1
5	Andy Seuss	388	−80	11	1	5	8	0
6	Kyle Ebersole	381	−87	11	0	3	7	0
7	Frank Fleming	366	−102	11	0	1	4	0
8	Thomas Stinson	357	−111	11	0	1	5	0
9	John Smith	357	−111	11	0	2	6	0
10	Burt Myers	353	−115	10	0	2	7	1

==== 2013 season ====
#	Event	Date	Track	Pole-winner	Winner
1	Charles Kepley Memorial 150	March 16, 2013	Caraway Speedway (Asheboro, NC)	Tim Brown	Jason Myers
2	KOMA Unwind Relaxation Drink 150	March 23, 2013	Southern National Motorsports Park (Kenly, NC)	Ryan Preece	Burt Myers
3	South Boston 150	April 13, 2013	South Boston Speedway (South Boston, VA)	George Brunnhoelzl III	George Brunnhoelzl III
4	Spring Fling 150	April 20, 2013	Caraway Speedway (Asheboro, NC)	George Brunnhoelzl III	George Brunnhoelzl III
5	Daggett Schuler / Rusty Harpe Memorial 150	July 5, 2013	Caraway Speedway (Asheboro, NC)	(Rained Out)	George Brunnhoelzl III
6	Kevin Powell Motorsports 199	August 3, 2013	Bowman Gray Stadium (Winston-Salem, NC)	Ryan Preece	Ryan Preece
7	Titan Roof 150	August 21, 2013	Bristol Motor Speedway (Bristol, TN)	Tim Brown*	Burt Myers*
8	Newport News Shipbuilding 150	August 31, 2013	Langley Speedway (Hampton, VA)	Andy Seuss	Kyle Ebersole
9	Caraway 150	September 8, 2013	Caraway Speedway (Asheboro, NC)	Andy Seuss	Andy Seuss
10	Zooland 150	September 28, 2013	Caraway Speedway (Asheboro, NC)	Burt Myers	Andy Seuss
11	G-Oil 150	October 5, 2013	Southern National Motorsports Park (Kenly, NC)	Burt Myers	Andy Seuss
12	UNOH Southern Slam 150	October 10, 2013	Charlotte Motor Speedway (Concord, NC)	Ryan Preece	Burt Myers

- Bristol WMT & WSMT combo races. Highest finishing WSMT driver credited a win.

===== 2013 top 10 points standings =====
Rank	Driver	Points	Diff	Starts	Wins	T5	T10	Poles
1	George Brunnhoelzl III	506		12	3	11	11	2
2	Kyle Ebersole	475	−31	12	1	8	10	0
3	Burt Myers	465	−41	12	3	5	10	2
4	Andy Seuss	464	−42	12	3	6	9	2
5	Tim Brown	438	−68	11	0	7	8	2
6	John Smith	435	−71	12	0	5	9	0
7	Jason Myers	428	−78	12	1	2	8	0
8	Luke Fleming	402	−104	12	0	1	5	0
9	Danny Bohn	395	−111	11	0	4	9	0
10	J. R. Bertuccio	392	−114	12	0	2	4	0

==== 2014 season ====
#	Event	Date	Track	Pole-winner	Winner
1	Whelen Season Opener 150	March 9, 2014	Caraway Speedway (Asheboro, NC)	Andy Seuss	Andy Seuss
2	Southern National 150	March 15, 2014	Southern National Motorsports Park (Kenly, NC)	George Brunnhoelzl III	J. R. Bertuccio
3	South Boston 150	April 5, 2014	South Boston Speedway (South Boston, VA)	Danny Bohn	Andy Seuss
4	Courtyard by Marriott / Pepsi 150	April 12, 2014	Langley Speedway (Hampton, VA)	Ryan Preece	George Brunnhoelzl III
5	Daggett Schuler Attorneys at Law 150	July 4, 2014	Caraway Speedway (Asheboro, NC)	Andy Seuss	Andy Seuss
6	Strutmasters.com 199	August 2, 2014	Bowman Gray Stadium (Winston-Salem, NC)	Danny Bohn	Danny Bohn
7	Bush's Beans 150	August 20, 2014	Bristol Motor Speedway (Bristol, TN)	Burt Myers*	J. R. Bertuccio*
8	Bayport Credit Union 150	August 30, 2014	Langley Speedway (Hampton, VA)	Ryan Preece	Burt Myers
9	Southern Pride 150	September 5, 2014	Caraway Speedway (Asheboro, NC)	George Brunnhoelzl III	Burt Myers
10	South Boston 150	September 13, 2014	South Boston Speedway (South Boston, VA)	Danny Bohn	Kyle Ebersole
11	Southern National 150	September 20, 2014	Southern National Motorsports Park (Kenly, NC)	Burt Myers	Burt Myers
12	Zooland 150	September 27, 2014	Caraway Speedway (Asheboro, NC)	Brian Loftin	George Brunnhoelzl III
13	Prestoria Farms 150	October 4, 2014	Caraway Speedway (Asheboro, NC)	Danny Bohn	Danny Bohn
14	Southern Slam 150	October 9, 2014	Charlotte Motor Speedway (Concord, NC)	Ryan Preece	Burt Myers

- Bristol WMT & WSMT combo races. Highest finishing WSMT driver credited a win.

===== 2014 top 10 points standings =====
Rank	Driver	Points	Diff	Starts	Wins	T5	T10	Poles
1	Andy Seuss	583		14	3	12	14	1
2	George Brunnhoelzl III	569	−14	14	2	11	11	2
3	Burt Myers	560	−23	14	4	9	12	2
4	J. R. Bertuccio	548	−35	14	2	9	12	0
5	Danny Bohn	542	−41	14	2	6	12	4
6	Kyle Ebersole	520	−63	13	1	7	10	0
7	Luke Fleming	511	−72	14	0	5	11	0
8	Gary Putnam	477	−106	14	0	0	7	0
9	Spencer Davis	475	−108	14	0	2	7	0
10	Jason Myers	465	−118	14	0	2	8	0

==== 2015 season ====
#	Event	Date	Track	Pole-winner	Winner
1	Spring Classic 150	March 15, 2015	Caraway Speedway (Asheboro, NC)	Jason Myers	Eric Goodale
2	Charles Kepley Memorial 150	March 28, 2015	Caraway Speedway (Asheboro, NC)	Ryan Preece	Andy Seuss
3	South Boston 150	April 4, 2015	South Boston Speedway (South Boston, VA)	Ryan Preece	Ryan Preece
4	Pepsi 150	April 11, 2015	Langley Speedway (Hampton, VA)	George Brunnhoelzl III	Burt Myers
5	Rusty Harpe Memorial 150	July 4, 2015	Caraway Speedway (Asheboro, NC)	Andy Seuss	George Brunnhoelzl III
6	Strutmasters.com 199	August 1, 2015	Bowman Gray Stadium (Winston-Salem, NC)	Ryan Preece	Danny Bohn
7	Bush's Beans 150	August 19, 2015	Bristol Motor Speedway (Bristol, TN)	Gary Putnam*	Andy Seuss*
8	Bayport Credit Union 150	September 5, 2015	Langley Speedway (Hampton, VA)	George Brunnhoelzl III	George Brunnhoelzl III
9	South Boston 150	September 19, 2015	South Boston Speedway (South Boston, VA)	Bobby Measmer Jr.	Andy Seuss
10	Southern Slam 150	October 8, 2015	Charlotte Motor Speedway (Concord, NC)	George Brunnhoelzl III	George Brunnhoelzl III

- Bristol WMT & WSMT combo races. Highest finishing WSMT driver credited a win.

===== 2015 top 10 points standings =====
Rank	Driver	Points	Diff	Starts	Wins	T5	T10	Poles
1	Andy Seuss	392		10	3	5	8	1
2	George Brunnhoelzl III	390	−2	10	3	6	6	3
3	Jason Myers	385	−7	10	0	5	10	1
4	Burt Myers	384	−8	10	1	6	8	0
5	Kyle Ebersole	371	−21	10	0	3	8	0
6	Frank Fleming	360	−32	10	0	3	7	0
7	Bobby Measmer Jr.	358	−34	10	0	3	8	1
8	Gary Putnam	343	−49	10	0	0	6	1
9	Jeremy Gerstner	342	−50	10	0	2	6	0
10	David Calabrese	324	−68	10	0	1	4	0

==== 2016 season ====
#	Event	Date	Track	Pole-winner	Winner
1	Davis Roofing 150	March 12, 2016	Caraway Speedway (Asheboro, NC)	Danny Bohn	Burt Myers
2	Spring Explosion 150	April 2, 2016	Concord Motorsport Park (Concord, NC)	Jason Myers	George Brunnhoelzl III
3	South Boston 150	April 9, 2016	South Boston Speedway (South Boston, VA)	Burt Myers	George Brunnhoelzl III
4	Dogwood 150	April 16, 2016	Caraway Speedway (Asheboro, NC)	Danny Bohn	Burt Myers
5	Davis Roofing 150	July 1, 2016	Caraway Speedway (Asheboro, NC)	J. R. Bertuccio	Andy Seuss
6	Strutmasters.com 199	August 6, 2016	Bowman Gray Stadium (Winston-Salem, NC)	Kyle Ebersole	Burt Myers
7	Bush's Beans 150	August 17, 2016	Bristol Motor Speedway (Bristol, TN)	Kyle Bonsignore*	Kyle Ebersole*
8	Visit Martin County 150	September 11, 2016	East Carolina Motor Speedway (Robersonville, NC)	Burt Myers	Bobby Measmer Jr.
9	South Boston 150	September 17, 2016	South Boston Speedway (South Boston, VA)	Danny Bohn	James Civali
10	Caraway 150	September 24, 2016	Caraway Speedway (Asheboro, NC)	Andy Seuss	George Brunnhoelzl III
11	Bad Boy Off Road Southern Slam 150	October 6, 2016	Charlotte Motor Speedway (Concord, NC)	George Brunnhoelzl III	Ryan Preece

- Bristol WMT and WSMT combo races. Highest finishing WSMT driver credited a win.

===== 2016 Top 10 points standings =====
Rank	Driver	Points	Diff	Starts	Wins	T5	T10	Poles
1	Burt Myers	465		11	3	9	11	2
2	George Brunnhoelzl III	445	−20	11	3	7	9	1
3	Andy Seuss	442	−23	11	1	8	11	1
4	Danny Bohn	432	−33	11	0	8	10	3
5	Bobby Measmer Jr.	426	−39	11	1	6	10	0
6	Jason Myers	418	−47	11	0	6	10	1
7	Kyle Bonsignore	401	−64	11	0	2	9	1
8	Jeremy Gerstner	379	−86	10	0	1	6	0
9	Kyle Ebersole	310	−155	8	1	1	5	1
10	Gary Putnam	310	−155	8	0	2	5	0

=== Merger with the Modified Tour ===
In 2016, after 12 years as a NASCAR series, NASCAR decided to drop the Southern Modified Tour and combine them with the northern tour starting in 2017.

== Champions ==
Year	Driver	Team Owner	Wins	Number	Make	Sponsor	Chassis
SMART Modified Tour
1989	Philip Smith	Philip Smith	1	#1	Oldsmobile		
1990	Jay Hedgecock (1)		5	#41	Pontiac	Wilson-Inman Racing	
1991	Junior Miller (1)		3	#69	Pontiac	Miller Motorsports	
1992	Jay Hedgecock (2)		3	#41	Pontiac	Wilson-Inman Racing	
1993	Junior Miller (2)		3	#69	Pontiac	A & J Salvage	
1994	Tim Arre	Riggs Racing	3	#56	Chevrolet		
1995	Junior Miller (3)		5	#69	Pontiac		
1996	Gary Myers	Phillip Smith	2	#1	Oldsmobile/Chevrolet	Doug Jones Enterprises	
1997	Junior Miller (4)	Riggs Racing	4	#69	Chevrolet	Miller Brick	
1998	Junior Miller (5)	Riggs Racing	3	#69	Chevrolet	Miller Brick	
1999	Junior Miller (6)	Riggs Racing	4	#69	Chevrolet	Advance Auto Parts	
2000	Junior Miller (7)	Riggs Racing	4	#69	Chevrolet	Advance Auto Parts	
2001	Jay Foley		4	#57	Chevrolet	Packaging Products	
2002	Burt Myers (1)	Gary Myers	3	#4	Chevrolet		
2003	L. W. Miller (1)	Miller Motorsports	4	#73	Chevrolet	Miller Auto Transport	Chassis Dynamics
2004	L. W. Miller (2)	Miller Motorsports	5	#73	Chevrolet		Chassis Dynamics
NASCAR Whelen Southern Modified Tour
2005	Junior Miller (8)	Riggs Racing	3	#69	Dodge	Advance Auto Parts	Troyer
2006	Junior Miller (9)	Riggs Racing	6	#69	Dodge	Advance Auto Parts	Troyer
2007	L. W. Miller (3)	Baker Motorsports	5	#36	Pontiac	John Baker Plumbing & Utilities	Chassis Dynamics
2008	Brian Loftin	Loftin Racing	4	#23	Chevrolet	L&R Transmission	Troyer
2009	George Brunnhoelzl III (1)	George Brunnhoelzl Jr.	5	#28	Ford	Fibrwrap	Troyer
2010	Burt Myers (2)	Phillip Smith	2	#1	Ford	Capital Bank	Troyer
2011	George Brunnhoelzl III (2)	Howard Harvey	5	#09	Chevrolet	Phoenix Pre-owned / Triad Auto Sales	Troyer
2012	George Brunnhoelzl III (3)	Howard Harvey	6	#09	Chevrolet	Phoenix Pre-Owned / Triad Auto Sales	Troyer
2013	George Brunnhoelzl III (4)	George Brunnhoelzl Jr.	3	#28	Chevrolet	Epox-Z	Troyer
2014	Andy Seuss (1)	Eddie Harvey	3	#11	Chevrolet	Ideal Finance	Troyer
2015	Andy Seuss (2)	Eddie Harvey	2	#11	Chevrolet	Northeast Race Cars/Ideal Finance	Troyer
2016	Burt Myers (3)	Burt Myers	3	#1	Ford	Remington SCT/Citrusafe/Speedway Auto Auction	LFR
SMART Modified Tour
2021	Burt Myers (4)	Burt Myers	0	#1	Chevrolet	Backyard Leisure	PSR
2022	Caleb Heady	Tommy Baldwin Racing	1	#7NY	Chevrolet	Baldwin Automotive	PSR
2023	Burt Myers (5)	Burt Myers	3	#1	Chevrolet	Backyard Leisure	PSR
2024	Luke Baldwin (1)	Sadler–Stanley Racing	2	#7VA	Chevrolet	Pace-O-Matic	PSR
2025	Luke Baldwin (2)	Sadler–Stanley Racing	4	#7VA	Chevrolet	Pace-O-Matic	PSR
2026	Jake Crum	Jake Crum	3	#1JC	N/A	Mount Airy Toyota	

=== Multi-time champions ===
==== SMART Modified Tour ====
Driver	Total	Seasons
Junior Miller	7	1991, 1993, 1995, 1997–2000
Burt Myers	3	2002, 2021, 2023
Jay Hedgecock	2	1990, 1992
L. W. Miller	2	2003–2004
Luke Baldwin	2	2024–2025
Jake Crum	1	2026

==== NASCAR Whelen Southern Modified Tour ====
Driver	Total	Seasons
George Brunnhoelzl III	4	2009, 2011–2013
Junior Miller	2	2005–2006
Burt Myers	2	2010, 2016
Andy Seuss	2	2014–2015

==== Overall ====
Driver	Total	Seasons
Junior Miller	9	1991, 1993, 1995, 1997–2000, 2005–2006
Burt Myers	5	2002, 2010, 2016, 2021, 2023
George Brunnhoelzl III	4	2009, 2011–2013
L. W. Miller	3	2003–2004, 2007
Jay Hedgecock	2	1990, 1992
Andy Seuss	2	2014–2015
Luke Baldwin	2	2024–2025

== Cars and rules ==
The tour features 600 horsepower open-wheeled modified's which run 15" wide Hoosier tires to give the cars added traction to attain speeds of up to 125 mph on some of the fastest short tracks in the South. Rules are similar to those used by the NASCAR Modified Tour. Cars must have a minimum weight of 2,900 pounds, maintain a wheelbase between 101 and 105 inches, and using 350 to 358 cubic-inch engines.

As the S.M.A.R.T. tour, the series added a Challenge to each event by allowing each competitor two laps of qualifying to determine their starting positions. Once these positions are established, the six fastest qualifiers draw numbers between 1 and 6. This shake up of the front runners adds to the action by letting the top six determine who is fastest competitor versus the fastest qualifier. Another exciting feature of the S.M.A.R.T. tour was that while all laps run under caution are counted, each race must end under green flag conditions insuring the fans will witness a Great down-to-the-wire finish at each event.

== Tracks ==
=== Current venues (2026) ===
- Anderson Motor Speedway – Anderson, SC (0.375 Mile Oval) – (2000–2001, 2025–present)
- Caraway Speedway – Asheboro, NC (0.455 Mile Oval) – (1990–2016, 2020–present)
- Carteret County Speedway – Swansboro, NC (0.400 Mile Oval) – (2021–present)
- Dominion Raceway – Thornburg, VA (0.400 Mile Oval) – (2021–2022, 2024–present)
- Florence Motor Speedway – Timmonsville, SC (0.400 Mile Oval) – (2020–2026)
- Franklin County Raceway – Callaway, VA (0.333 Mile Oval) – (1995–1996, 1999, 2021–present)
- Hickory Motor Speedway – Newton, NC (0.333 Mile Oval) – (1990, 1995, 2006, 2011, 2021–present)
- Pulaski County Motorsports Park – Radford, VA (0.416 Mile Oval) – (1989–1991, 2000–2002, 2004–2006, 2021–2023, 2026)
- North Wilkesboro Speedway – North Wilkesboro, NC (0.625 Mile Oval) – (1989–1992, 1996, 2024–2026)
- Orange County Speedway – Rougemont, NC (0.375 Mile Oval) – (2022–present)
- South Boston Speedway – South Boston, VA (0.400 Mile Oval) – (1992–1993, 2001, 2009–2016, 2021–present)
- Tri-County Motor Speedway – Hudson, NC (0.400 Mile Oval) – (1990–1999, 2010–2011, 2022–present)
- Wake County Speedway – Raleigh, NC (0.250 Mile Oval) – (2026)

=== Future and returning venues ===
- Ace Speedway – Altamahaw, NC (0.400 Mile Oval) – (1994, 2000–2003, 2005–2009, 2023, 2027)
- New Smyrna Speedway - Samsula, FL (0.500 Mile Oval) - (2027)

=== Former venues ===
- Bowman Gray Stadium – Winston-Salem, NC (0.250 Mile Oval) – (1992, 2005–2016)
- Bristol Motor Speedway – Bristol, TN (0.500 Mile Oval) – (2009–2016)
- Charlotte Motor Speedway Legends Track – Concord, NC (0.250 Mile Oval) – (2010–2016)
- Concord Speedway – Midland, NC (0.500 Mile Oval) – (1991, 1998–1999, 2002–2004, 2009, 2016)
- Dillon Motor Speedway – Dillon, SC (0.400 Mile Oval) – (2021)
- East Carolina Motor Speedway – Robersonville, NC (0.400 Mile Oval) – (2016)
- Friendship Motor Speedway – Elkin, NC (0.400 Mile Oval) – (2003–2004)
- Greenville-Pickens Speedway – Greenville, SC (0.500 Mile Oval) – (2006–2007)
- Gresham Motorsports Park – Jefferson, GA (0.500 Mile Oval) – (1995)
- Langley Speedway – Hampton, VA (0.395 Mile Oval) – (1989, 2001–2002, 2010–2015)
- Lonesome Pine Raceway – Coeburn, VA (0.375 Mile Oval) – (1990, 1999)
- Lanier Raceplex – Braselton, GA (0.375 Mile Oval) – (1991, 2008–2009)
- Martinsville Speedway – Ridgeway, VA (0.500 Mile Oval) – (2005–2009)
- Myrtle Beach Speedway – Myrtle Beach, SC (0.530 Mile Oval) – (1989–1996, 1998–2001, 2003–2004, 2009)
- Nashville Fairgrounds Speedway – Nashville, TN (0.590 Mile Oval) – (2007)
- New River All-American Speedway – Jacksonville, NC (0.400 Mile Oval) – (2000, 2024)
- Southern National Motorsports Park – Kenly, NC (0.400 Mile Oval) – (1993–1994, 2006–2008, 2013–2014, 2022)
- Summerville Speedway – Summerville, SC (0.500 Mile Oval) – (1993–1996, 1998–1999, 2002–2003)
- Thompson Speedway Motorsports Park – Thompson, CT (0.625 Mile Oval) – (2011–2012)
- Thunder Ring at Atlanta Motor Speedway – Hampton, GA (0.250 Mile Oval) – (2010)

== Winners table ==
Through 4/21/2026.

Driver	Original SMART Era (1989–2004)	NASCAR Era (2005–2016)	Current SMART Era (2020–present)	Total (1989–2016, 2020–present)
Junior Miller	39	10	0	49
Burt Myers	8	19	3	30
George Brunnhoelzl III	0	28	0	28
L. W. Miller	11	13	0	24
Frank Fleming	21	1	0	22
Andy Seuss	0	22	0	22
Jay Hedgecock	20	1	0	21
Brian Loftin	4	12	5	21
Gary Myers	14	0	0	14
Matt Hirschman	0	0	10	10
Jay Foley	9	0	0	9
Danny Bohn	0	4	4	8
Tim Brown	0	7	0	7
Ted Christopher	1	6	0	7
Carson Loftin	0	0	7	7
Brandon Ward	0	1	6	7
Luke Baldwin	0	0	6	6
Tim Arre	5	0	0	5
Ryan Newman	0	0	5	5
Philip Smith	5	0	0	5
Bobby Labonte	0	0	4	4
Ryan Preece	0	3	1	4
Jonathan Brown	0	0	3	3
James Civali	0	3	0	3
Kyle Ebersole	0	3	0	3
Caleb Heady	0	0	3	3
Bobby Hutchens	3	0	0	3
Robert Jeffreys	3	0	0	3
Jason Myers	0	3	0	3
John Smith	1	1	1	3
J. R. Bertuccio	0	2	0	2
Joey Coulter	0	0	2	2
Alfred Hill	2	0	0	2
Roger Hill	2	0	0	2
Billy Middleton	2	0	0	2
Doug Wolcott	2	0	0	2
Blake Barney	0	0	1	1
Ralph Brinkley	1	0	0	1
Johnny Bush	1	0	0	1
Randy Butner	1	0	0	1
Jonathan Cash	0	0	1	1
Michael Clifton	1	0	0	1
Luke Fleming	0	1	0	1
Ed Flemke Jr.	1	0	0	1
Eric Goodale	0	1	0	1
Paulie Hartwig III	0	0	1	1
Andy Jankowiak	0	0	1	1
Tony Jankowiak	1	0	0	1
Brian King	0	1	0	1
Corey LaJoie	0	1	0	1
Bobby Measmer Jr.	0	1	0	1
Bob Park	1	0	0	1
Gary Putnam	0	0	1	1
Sam Rameau	0	0	1	1
Ron Silk	0	0	1	1
Jimmy Spencer	1	0	0	1
Paul Spencer	1	0	0	1

=== Current tracks ===
Track	Driver	Wins
Caraway Speedway	Junior Miller	28
Carteret County Speedway	Bobby Labonte, Brian Loftin, Brandon Ward	1
Florence Motor Speedway	Matt Hirschman	2
Franklin County Speedway	John Smith, Jonathan Brown, Burt Myers	1
Hickory Motor Speedway	Junior Miller	3
North Wilkesboro Speedway	Phillip Smith & Frank Fleming	2
South Boston Speedway	Andy Seuss	3
Tri-County Motor Speedway	Frank Fleming	4

=== Former tracks ===
Track	Driver	Wins
Ace Speedway	Burt Myers & L. W. Miller	2
Anderson Speedway	Junior Miller	2
Bowman Gray Stadium	Burt Myers	3
Charlotte Motor Speedway	Burt Myers	3
Concord Speedway	Jay Hedgecock	3
Friendship Motor Speedway	L. W. Miller	3
Greenville-Pickens Speedway	Junior Miller	2
Langley Speedway	Doug Wolcott, Burt Myers & George Brunnhoelzl III	2
Motor Mile Speedway	Jay Hedgecock, Brian Loftin & L. W. Miller	2
Myrtle Beach Speedway	Jay Hedgecock, Tim Arre, Jay Foley & Junior Miller	2
Southern National Motorsports Park	Burt Myers	3
Summerville Speedway	Frank Fleming	2

== Rookie of the Year Award ==
Year	Driver
1990	
2003	Brad Smith
2004	Tommy Neal
2005	No award (first year under NASCAR banner)
2006	Brian King
2007	Wesley Swartout
2008	Buddy Emory
2009	None
2010	Greg Butcher
2011	Austin Pack
2012	Danny Bohn
2013	Luke Fleming
2014	Spencer Davis
2015	Trey Hutchens
2016	Kyle Bonsignore

== Most Popular Driver Award ==
Year	Driver
2005	Junior Miller
2006	Junior Miller
2007	L. W. Miller
2008	Bobby Hutchens
2009	Andy Seuss
2010	Burt Myers
2011	Jason Myers
2012	Danny Bohn
2013	Andy Seuss
2014	Andy Seuss
2015	Trey Hutchens
2016	Trey Hutchens

== See also ==
- NASCAR
- Whelen Modified Tour
- NASCAR Home Tracks
- PASS
