= Jimmy Wallace (racing driver) =

American racing driver

- Nationality: American
- Born: Lexington, North Carolina, U.S.

SMART Modified Tour career
- Debut season: 2021
- Current team: Jason Tutterow
- Years active: 2021–present
- Car number: 21
- Starts: 72
- Championships: 0
- Wins: 0
- Poles: 0
- Best finish: 8th in 2021
- Finished last season: 12th (2025)
- Statistics up to date as of October 17, 2026.

Jimmy Wallace (birth date unknown) is an American professional stock car racing driver who currently competes in the SMART Modified Tour, driving the No. 21 for Jason Tutterow. Wallace works at ECR Engines as chief engine builder.

Wallace has also competed in series such as the Southern Modified Racing Series, the Carolina Crate Modified Series, the Southern Modified Race Tour, and the NASCAR Weekly Series.

== Motorsports results ==
=== SMART Modified Tour ===
SMART Modified Tour results
Year	Car owner	No.	Make	1	2	3	4	5	6	7	8	9	10	11	12	13	14	SMTC	Pts	Ref
2021	N/A	22	N/A	CRW; 13	FLO; DNS	SBO; 8	FCS	CRW; 5	DIL; 10	CAR; 6	CRW; 9	DOM	PUL; 19	HCY; 17				8th	191	
2021	N/A	22W	N/A												ACE; 7			8th	191	
2022	Jason Tutterow	21W	Fury	FLO; 8		CRW; 19	SBO; 18	FCS	CRW; DNS	NWS	NWS							11th	157	
2022	Jason Tutterow	21	Fury		SNM; 10							CAR; 16	DOM; 10	HCY; 27	TRI; 11	PUL; 6		11th	157	
2023	Jason Tutterow	21	Fury	FLO; 24	CRW; 13	SBO; 20	HCY; 27	FCS	CRW; 9	ACE; 18	CAR; 24	PUL; 21	TRI; 15	SBO; 16	ROU; 16			15th	248	
2024	Jason Tutterow	21	Fury	FLO; 23	CRW; 15	SBO; 8	TRI; 12	ROU; 15	HCY; 22	FCS; 19	CRW; 19			CRW; 21	DOM; 14	SBO; 15	NWS; 11	12th	350	
2024	Jason Tutterow	21W	Fury									JAC; 16						12th	350	
2024	Jason Tutterow	21X	Fury										CAR; 14					12th	350	
2025	Jason Tutterow	21	Fury	FLO; 20	AND; 13	SBO; 20	ROU; 12	HCY; 13	FCS; 16	CRW; 15	CPS; 14	CAR; 15	CRW; 15	DOM; 14	FCS; 13	TRI; 15	NWS; 15	12th	364	
2026	Jason Tutterow	21	Fury	FLO; 16	AND; 15	SBO; 29	DOM; 20	HCY	WKS; 9	FCR; 19	CRW; 25	PUL; 17	CAR; 19	ROU; 21	TRI; 22	NWS; 26		14th	254	
