= 2021 Southern Modified Auto Racing Teams season =

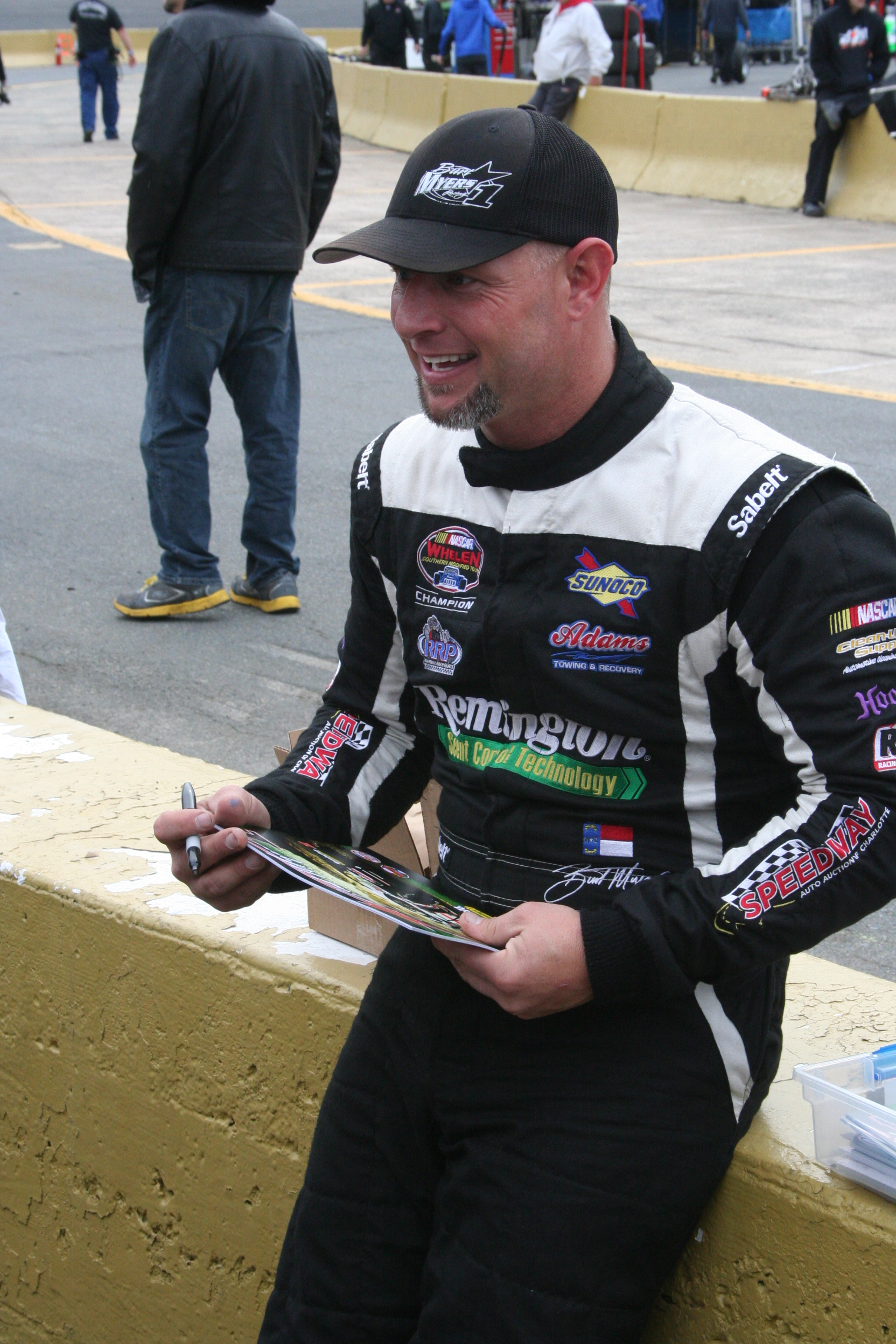
Burt Myers, the 2021 SMART Modified Tour champion.

The 2021 Southern Modified Auto Racing Teams was the 17th season of the SMART Modified Tour, and the first full season since 2004 (there were four races held by the series in 2020 due to the COVID-19 pandemic). It began with the Smart Chevrolet 99 at Caraway Speedway on March 14. It ended with the Rodney Cook Classic at Ace Speedway on October 23. Burt Myers won his second championship in the series, 23 points ahead of series runner up John Smith.

== Schedule ==
No.	Race title	Track	Date
1	Smart Chevrolet 99	Caraway Speedway, Asheboro, North Carolina	March 14
2	Smart Chevrolet 75	Florence Motor Speedway, Timmonsville, South Carolina	March 20
3	N/A	South Boston Speedway, South Boston, Virginia	April 3
4	Kenny Minter Classic	Franklin County Speedway, Callaway, Virginia	May 8
5	Rusty Harpe Memorial	Caraway Speedway, Asheboro, North Carolina	July 3
6	N/A	Dillon Motor Speedway, Dillon, South Carolina	August 28
7	Bobby Watson Memorial	Carteret Motor Speedway, Swansboro, North Carolina	September 5
8	N/A	Caraway Speedway, Asheboro, North Carolina	September 11
9	Craig Murto Memorial 99	Dominion Raceway, Thornburg, Virginia	September 18
10	N/A	Pulaski County Motorsports Park, Radford, Virginia	October 2
11	Smart Chevrolet 99 presented by Hayes Jewelers of Lexington	Hickory Motor Speedway, Hickory, North Carolina	October 9
12	Rodney Cook Classic	Ace Speedway, Altamahaw, North Carolina	October 23

== Results and standings ==
=== Races ===
No.	Race	Pole position	Most laps led	Winning driver
1	Smart Chevrolet 99	Matt Hirschman	Matt Hirschman	Matt Hirschman
2	Smart Chevrolet 75	Caleb Heady	Caleb Heady	Caleb Heady
3	N/A	Chuck Hossfeld	Ryan Preece	Ryan Preece
4	Kenny Minter Classic	Burt Myers	Frank Fleming	John Smith
5	Rusty Harpe Memorial	Gary Putnam	James Civali	Gary Putnam
6	N/A	Bobby Labonte	Jeremy Gerstner	Bobby Labonte
7	Bobby Watson Memorial	Brandon Ward	Bobby Labonte	Bobby Labonte
8	N/A	Brian Loftin	Jonathan Brown	Jonathan Brown
9	Craig Murto Memorial 99	Matt Hirschman	Matt Hirschman	Matt Hirschman
10	N/A	Burt Myers	Max Zachem	Brandon Ward
11	Smart Chevrolet 99 presented by Hayes Jewelers of Lexington	Burt Myers	Brandon Ward	Brandon Ward
12	Rodney Cook Classic	Gary Young Jr.	James Civali	Jonathan Brown

=== Drivers' championship ===
(key) Bold - Pole position awarded by time. Italics - Pole position set by final practice results or rainout. * – Most laps led.

Pos	Driver	CRW	FLO	SBO	FCS	CRW	DIL	CAR	CRW	DOM	PUL	HCY	ACE	Points
1	Burt Myers	2	5	3	**8**	11	13	8	3	2	**3**	**4**	15	305
2	John Smith	3	6	10	1	16	4	**7***	8	6	9	10		282
3	Brian Loftin	14	3	15	6	4	7	5	**6**	7	4	7	3	277
4	Bobby Labonte	9	2	17	7		**1**	1*	2	13	6	2		267
5	Jason Myers	12	8	5	3	10	6	9	7	3	16	8	17	264
6	Jeremy Gerstner	16	11	16	14	8	5*	2	5	8	5	14		246
7	Dennis Holdren	17	9	4	13	9	12	10	10	10	15	13	13	219
8	Jimmy Wallace	13	DNS	7		5	10	6	9		19	17	7	191
9	James Civali		DNS	9	2	6*	14	12	15		17	9	5*	183
10	Brandon Ward		7	19	16		2	**3**			1	1*	2	179
11	Brian Weber		16	13	10	17	16	11	16	12	20	20		159
12	Gary Putnam	11	4		15	**1**	11		14		8			158
13	Daniel Yates	21	14	11	9	12	15		11		25	12	21	149
14	Caleb Heady	5	**1***			2			4		2		4	146
15	Danny Bohn					7	3			5		5		106
16	Mike Norman	19	13			13			12		10	18	8	101
17	Chuck Hossfeld	4		**2**	11		9							100
18	Tom Buzze	8		14						4	18	15		96
19	Jonathan Brown							4	1*		7		1	86
20	Matt Hirschman	**1***								**1***				73
21	Ryan Preece			1*	12									58
22	Chris Finocchario			20			8			15	24			57
23	Frank Fleming	18		22	4*									49
24	Darin Redmon				DNS	14			13					48
25	Brody Jones	15	15	DNS										40
26	Tim Brown	22	10	21										40
27	Zach Brewer			6								16		40
28	Chris Fleming				5						21		16	36
29	Jonathan Kievman	10		18		DNS								34
30	Jamie Tomaino					15					14			33
31	Joey Coulter					3								28
32	Andy Seuss											3		28
33	Jeff Fultz	6												25
34	Danny Propst	25		12										25
35	Bobby Measmer Jr.											6		25
36	Jared Fryar	7												24
37	J. R. Bertuccio			8										24
38	Rusty Skewes									9	22		12	22
39	Daniel Beeson	24			17								10	21
40	Wes Gilbert									11				20
41	Max Zachem										11*			20
42	Dylan Ward											11	19	20
43	Bryan Dauzat		12											19
44	Paul Hall										12		14	19
45	Marty Edwards							13						18
46	Troy Young										13		9	18
47	Bobby McCarty									14				17
48	Buzzy Beavers										27	19		16
49	Jason Clark						17							14
50	Ronnie Williams	20												11
51	Michael Clifton	23												8
52	Hermie Sadler										23			8
53	Craig Young										26			5
54	Luke Fleming										28			3
	Chad Hodges												11	0
	Josh Nichols												6	0
	Dean Ward												20	0
	Gary Young Jr.												**18**	0
Pos	Driver	CRW	FLO	SBO	FCS	CRW	DIL	CAR	CRW	DOM	PUL	HCY	ACE	Points

== See also ==
- 2021 NASCAR Cup Series
- 2021 NASCAR Xfinity Series
- 2021 NASCAR Camping World Truck Series
- 2021 ARCA Menards Series
- 2021 ARCA Menards Series East
- 2021 ARCA Menards Series West
- 2021 NASCAR Whelen Modified Tour
- 2021 NASCAR Pinty's Series
- 2021 NASCAR Whelen Euro Series
- 2021 eNASCAR iRacing Pro Invitational Series
- 2021 SRX Series
- 2021 CARS Tour
