= Tom Buzze =

American racing driver

- Born: February 3, 1982 (age 44); Maiden, North Carolina, U.S.

ARCA Menards Series career
- 3 races run over 2 years
- Best finish: 107th (2014)
- First race: 2002 Jasper Engines & Transmissions 200 (Toledo)
- Last race: 2014 Lucas Oil 200 (Daytona)
Wins	Top tens	Poles
0	0	0
- Statistics up to date as of October 24, 2024.

Thomas Buzze Jr. (born February 3, 1982) is an American professional stock car racing driver who has competed in the ARCA Racing Series and the SMART Modified Tour.

Buzze has also competed in series such as the Hooters Pro Cup Series, the Southern Modified Racing Series, the Southern Modified Race Tour, and the CCS Modified Series.

== Motorsports results ==
=== ARCA Racing Series ===
(key) (Bold – Pole position awarded by qualifying time. Italics – Pole position earned by points standings or practice time. * – Most laps led.)

ARCA Racing Series results
Year	Team	No.	Make	1	2	3	4	5	6	7	8	9	10	11	12	13	14	15	16	17	18	19	20	21	22	ARSC	Pts	Ref
2002	Thomas Buzze Racing	35	Chevy	DAY	ATL	NSH	SLM	KEN	CLT	KAN	POC	MCH	TOL; 20	SBO	KEN	BLN	POC	NSH	ISF	WIN	DSF	CHI	SLM	TAL	CLT	141st	130	
2003	Capital City Motorsports	83	Chevy	DAY	ATL	NSH	SLM	TOL	KEN	CLT	BLN	KAN	MCH	LER	POC	POC	NSH	ISF	WIN	DSF	CHI	SLM	TAL	CLT; 33	SBO	179th	65	
2014	RACE 101	3	Chevy	DAY; 17	MOB	SLM	TAL	TOL	NJE	POC	MCH	ELK	WIN	CHI	IRP	POC	BLN	ISF	MAD	DSF	SLM	KEN	KAN			107th	145	

=== SMART Modified Tour ===
SMART Modified Tour results
Year	Car owner	No.	Make	1	2	3	4	5	6	7	8	9	10	11	12	13	14	SMTC	Pts	Ref
2021	Tom Buzze Sr.	5	LFR	CRW; 8	FLO	SBO; 14	FCS	CRW	DIL	CAR	CRW	DOM; 4	PUL; 18	HCY; 15	ACE			18th	96	
2022	Tom Buzze Sr.	5	LFR	FLO	SNM; 22	CRW				NWS; 6	NWS; 27	CAR	DOM; 20	HCY	TRI	PUL		29th	47	
2022	Tom Buzze Sr.	5B	LFR				SBO; 5	FCS	CRW									29th	47	
2023	Tom Buzze Sr.	5	LFR	FLO	CRW	SBO; 2	HCY; 23	FCS	CRW; 10	ACE; 11	CAR	PUL; DNS	TRI; 7	SBO; 4	ROU			16th	206	
2024	Michael Smith	25	N/A	FLO; 14	CRW; 21	SBO; 18	TRI; 3	ROU; 6	HCY; 10	FCS; 6	CRW; 6	JAC; 11	CAR; 7	CRW; 9	DOM; 8	SBO; 22	NWS; 23	7th	416	
2025	Tom Buzze	5	LFR	FLO	AND	SBO; 24	ROU	HCY; 9	FCS	CRW; 24	CPS	CAR	CRW	DOM; Wth	FCS	TRI; 16	NWS; 19	23rd	109	
2026	Tom Buzze	5	LFR	FLO	AND	SBO	DOM	HCY; 16	WKS	FCR	CRW; 23	PUL	CAR	ROU; 7	TRI; 15	NWS; 27		23rd	117	
