= Joey Coulter =

American stock car racing driver

- Coulter at Anderson Motor Speedway in 2026
- Born: Joseph Richard Coulter IV; June 8, 1990 (age 36); Miami Springs, Florida, U.S.
- Awards: 2011 NASCAR Truck Series Rookie of the Year

NASCAR O'Reilly Auto Parts Series career
- 5 races run over 2 years
- 2013 position: 113th
- Best finish: 113th (2013)
- First race: 2012 History 300 (Charlotte)
- Last race: 2013 Kentucky 300 (Kentucky)
Wins	Top tens	Poles
0	1	0

NASCAR FedEx Freight Truck Series career
- 91 races run over 4 years
- 2014 position: 7th
- Best finish: 3rd (2012)
- First race: 2011 NextEra Energy Resources 250 (Daytona)
- Last race: 2014 Ford EcoBoost 200 (Homestead)
- First win: 2012 Pocono Mountains 125 (Pocono)
Wins	Top tens	Poles
1	43	3
- Statistics up to date as of June 19, 2020.

Joseph Richard Coulter IV (born June 8, 1990) is an American motorsports driver development coach and racing driver. He is currently the owner of driver development program DriveRefine Performance Management and a racer in the SMART Modified Tour, driving the No. 02 for his family-owned team. Coulter has also previously raced full-time in the NASCAR Truck Series and the ARCA Racing Series.

Born and raised in Miami Springs, Florida, Coulter began racing go-karts in his local state of Florida in 1998. After seven years racing go-karts, Coulter transitioned to oval track racing in 2005, racing in FASTRUCK. After two years in the series, Coulter moved up to the regional Pro Cup Series in 2007. In 2009, Coulter advanced to the nationally touring ARCA Racing Series, winning one race in his two full-time seasons in the series. In 2011, Coulter advanced to the NASCAR Truck Series. Racing for a variety of teams in the span of four years, Coulter earned one win, Rookie of the Year honors in 2011, and a best driver's standings finish of third in 2012. After his stint in the NASCAR Truck Series, Coulter transitioned to roles in driver development starting in 2015, including creating his own driver development program, while racing in regional racing series.

== Early life and family background ==
Coulter was born on June 8, 1990, in Miami Springs, Florida, where he was raised. He is the son of Joe and Susan Coulter. He was educated at Palmer Trinity School, graduating in 2008. While attending Palmer Trinity, Coulter participated in various sports, including baseball and soccer, which he enjoyed but admitted that "I wasn't very good at it because I'm not a particularly good runner".

After high school, Coulter attended University of North Carolina at Charlotte (UNCC), initially majoring in engineering to join the university's motorsports program. Midway through his university studies, he switched majors to business management in supply chain management and logistics, delaying his graduation to 2016. According to Coulter, he switched majors due to various issues in the engineering program, primarily a lack of flexibility in taking courses and exams.

== Racing career ==
=== Early racing career ===
Coulter was introduced to motorsports by his family, with Coulter often watching races at the now-demolished Hialeah Speedway and the Speedvision Channel (now known as Speed) while at his grandmother's house. He began his racing career in go-karts in 1998 at the age of seven, racing in various locations in his home state of Florida for seven years. In 2005, Coulter moved to the FASTRUCK Racing Series, a pickup truck developmental motorsports series in Florida, racing in the series for two years. In 2007, Coulter moved up to the USAR Pro Cup (now known as the CARS Tour), racing for his family team, Coulter Motorsports. For his stint in Pro Cup, Coulter was coached by racing driver Randy Renfrow. In later interviews, Coulter stated that moving to Pro Cup was akin to "throw[ing] you into the deep end" of motorsports. In his first attempt for a Pro Cup race at USA International Speedway, Coulter failed to qualify for the event; despite this, Pro Cup officials allowed him to run the event. Coulter struggled throughout 2007 and 2008, and later stated that he considered quitting motorsports but opted to continue racing in 2009 with new and eventual longtime crew chief throughout Coulter's career, Harold Holly.

=== NASCAR career ===
==== ARCA Racing Series (2009–2010) ====
In 2009, Coulter committed to a full-time season in the ARCA Racing Series. To prepare for the season, Coulter's family bought equipment from Justin Allgaier, who had won the ARCA Racing Series championship the previous year. He made his debut in the series at the season-opener in Daytona using rented equipment from ARCA Racing Series champion Bobby Gerhart, finishing in 23rd after being involved in a crash. At the tenth round at Iowa Speedway, Coulter earned his first pole in the ARCA Racing Series. Coulter ended the 2009 season fourth in the driver's standings, earning seven top-fives and two poles with an average finish of 10.6. He additionally earned second in the rookie of the year standings, being beat out for the award by Parker Kligerman.

Coulter continued racing full-time in the ARCA Racing Series in 2010. Season-wise, Coulter experienced a slight statistical drop in results, earning six top-fives and an average finish of 11.1. In the first ten races of the season, Coulter did not finish in two races at Texas and Mansfield, both of which were due to accidents. At the 12th race of the season at Berlin Raceway, Coulter won his first and only ARCA Racing Series event, leading 55 laps. Coulter finished the season eighth in the points, earning one pole. Coulter described his stint in the ARCA Racing Series as crucial for his professional development, stating that in ARCA, "I learned about earning respect on the national stage, learned how to talk to a camera, do a radio interview, learning how to tuck your shirt in... I was learning how to do it in the middle of [the media landscape] changing".

==== NASCAR Truck Series (2011–2014) ====
In 2011, Coulter moved up to the NASCAR Truck Series, signing a full-time contract with Richard Childress Racing (RCR), owned by motorsports businessman Richard Childress. Prior to 2011, Coulter first met Childress during a Pro Cup race, which Coulter later described in an interview as a "one of those light bulb moments in my career." According to Coulter, he originally was planning to race another season in the ARCA Racing Series before Childress offered a Truck Series ride. Coulter made his Truck Series debut at the opener at Daytona, where he finished in 34th after sustaining an incident early in the race due to a flat tire, finishing 38 laps down. Coulter struggled in the first five races of the season, finishing outside of the top-15 four times. At the eighth round of the season at Kansas, Coulter was involved in an after-race incident with driver Kyle Busch, which led to a fight between Busch and Coulter's owner, Richard Childress. In the later races of the season, Coulter improved statistically, earning five top-fives. At season's end, Coulter finished seventh in the driver's standings, winning Rookie of the Year against several drivers, including Nelson Piquet Jr., Cole Whitt, Parker Kligerman, and Miguel Paludo.

For the 2012 season, Coulter remained at RCR for the full-time season. In the season-opener at Daytona, Coulter was involved in a major crash on the final lap of the event, with his truck crashing into the catchfence after going airborne on the track's frontstretch; Coulter was not injured from the crash. After a second-straight poor finish due to damage from an early flat tire at Martinsville, Coulter finished within the top 15 in every race for the rest of the season. At the 11th race of the season at Pocono, Coulter won his first and only career Truck Series race, leading seven laps. At the next race in Michigan, Coulter obtained his first career pole. Coulter earned two more poles during the season at Kentucky and Las Vegas. Coulter ended the season third in the driver's standings, finishing with seven top five finishes. During 2012, Coulter made his debut in the NASCAR Nationwide Series (now known as the NASCAR O'Reilly Auto Parts Series), finishing 14th at the 11th race of the Nationwide Series season at Charlotte in a RCR entry.

For 2013, Coulter moved to Kyle Busch Motorsports (KBM), owned by racing driver Kyle Busch, to drive the organization's No. 18 entry full-time for that year's Truck Series season. According to Coulter, he moved from RCR to KBM due to KBM offering more stabilized and concrete sponsorship opportunities than RCR. As part of the move, Coulter, who was a scouted as a potential prospect for a Nationwide Series ride for RCR in 2013, was replaced by Brian Scott. Coulter described his 2013 season as "dismal", with a noticeable drop in statistical results from Coulter's 2012 season. At the fourth round of the season at Kansas, Coulter had his best finish of the season with a second-place finish, having competed for the victory with Matt Crafton. Coulter ended the season 15th in the driver's standings, with three top-fives and two DNFs due to crashes at Iowa and Las Vegas. Coulter left KBM at the end of the 2013 season; despite leaving the organization, Coulter stated that driving for Busch was "really great" and that if given the chance, "I'd race for [KBM] again in a heartbeat".

Starting in December 2013, Coulter was rumored to move from KBM to Las Vegas-based team GMS Racing, owned by Allegiant Air chairman Maury Gallagher, for the 2014 Truck Series season by NASCAR sportscaster Dave Moody. Coulter's move was officially announced the following month, becoming a full-time driver in the team's first full-time season in the Truck Series. In the season-opener at Daytona, Coulter was involved in a 17-truck crash that led to a DNF result of 32nd. During the season, Coulter earned three top-fives and seven additional top-tens. In the penultimate race of the season at Phoenix, Coulter had his second DNF of the season after his truck blew a tire and crashed into the outside wall early in the event. At the end of the season, Coulter finished seventh in the driver's standings, with an average finish of 13.1. Following the 2014 season, Coulter left driving duties for GMS Racing due to a lack of sponsorship for the 2015 season. He later stated that he additionally lost motivation to race in the Truck Series due to rule changes regarding the engineering of Truck Series vehicles.

=== Post-NASCAR career ===
In 2014, during his time at GMS Racing, Coulter alongside longtime crew chief Harold Holly created Rum Runner Racing. According to Coulter, the name came from a light-hearted joke that the team's employees were "all a bunch of amateur alcoholics from the Keys". The following year, Coulter made a return to racing in dirt late models. Coulter had previously bought dirt late model cars alongside crate and super late model engines in 2012, making his dirt racing debut within the year and winning his first dirt late model race in his second career start. For the following year, Coulter raced his first full-time season in the World of Outlaws Late Model Series. Coulter described the beginning of his stint in the series as "really rough", failing to qualify for numerous features. He continued to race in the series for the following year. Beginning in 2019, Coulter only raced dirt late models on a part-time basis, focusing more on ownership of Rum Runner Racing and its dirt late model driver, Brandon Overton.

Sometime in 2020, Coulter was asked by racing driver Randy Renfrow, who coached Coulter since his stint in Pro Cup, to race a paved modified car owned by Renfrow. After a shakedown test at Hickory Motor Speedway, Coulter made his debut in the SMART Modified Tour on October 16, 2020, at Florence Motor Speedway. In his debut attempt, Coulter broke the track record for modifieds and won the feature event. Over the following two years, Coulter made periodical starts in the SMART Modified Tour, including a feature win at Caraway Speedway in 2022. For the 2023 season, Coulter ran a full-time season in SMART Modified Tour. In his first full-time season, Coulter earned six top-fives and fifth in the driver's standings. In December 2025, Coulter was elected as a Hoosier Hero, an award given out by tire company Hoosier Racing Tire for "celebrat[ing] racers who live out Hoosier's spirit of passion, pride and success both on and off the track".

== Motorsports driver management ventures ==
Prior to 2015, Coulter had various stints performing various driver management duties. From 2011 to 2012, Coulter managed drivers who raced for Coulter Motorsports' ARCA Racing Series team. After the 2014 NASCAR Truck Series season, Coulter was hired as team relations coordinator for GMS Racing in January 2015. He later worked on managing GMS Racing driver Brandon Jones for the 2015 season.

Also in 2015, Coulter created CIV Driver Optimization, a driver development program, initially working with racing driver Howie DiSavino III. Four years later, Coulter alongside fellow racer Austin Theriault formed DriveRefine, a driver development program which Coulter described as an evolution of CIV Driver Optimization. DriveRefine in the following years collaborated with numerous racing organizations, including the Candice Hornaday-founded Team Hornaday Development and motorsports marketing firm Scott Lynch Media, with the organization eventually evolving to become DriveRefine Performance Management. Throughout DriveRefine's existence, Coulter has worked with various drivers both on a regional and national level, including drivers in NASCAR national touring series.

== Personal life ==
Coulter married Jessica Green on January 24, 2015. Joey met Jessica while he was racing in FASTRACK sometime in 2006 and began dating during Coulter's stint in the Pro Cup Series. With Jessica, they have two daughters: Charlie (born June 2, 2015) and Adaline. In his spare time, Coulter is a softball coach for a softball team where his daughters play on. Coulter is affiliated with the Darrell Gwynn Foundation, a charity founded by drag racer Darrell Gwynn focusing on spinal cord injury awareness.

== Motorsports career results ==
=== NASCAR ===
(key) (Bold – Pole position awarded by qualifying time. Italics – Pole position earned by points standings or practice time. * – Most laps led.)

==== Nationwide Series ====
NASCAR Nationwide Series results
Year	Team	No.	Make	1	2	3	4	5	6	7	8	9	10	11	12	13	14	15	16	17	18	19	20	21	22	23	24	25	26	27	28	29	30	31	32	33	NNSC	Pts	Ref
2012	Richard Childress Racing	21	Chevy	DAY	PHO	LVS	BRI	CAL	TEX	RCH	TAL	DAR	IOW	CLT; 10	DOV	MCH	ROA	KEN	DAY	NHA	CHI	IND	IOW	GLN	CGV	BRI	ATL	RCH	CHI	KEN	DOV	CLT	KAN	TEX	PHO	HOM; 14	123rd	0^{1}	
2013	Joe Gibbs Racing	54	Toyota	DAY	PHO	LVS	BRI	CAL	TEX	RCH	TAL; 21	DAR	CLT	DOV	IOW	MCH	ROA	KEN	DAY	NHA	CHI; 14	IND	IOW	GLN	MOH	BRI	ATL	RCH	CHI								113th	0^{1}	
2013	Joe Gibbs Racing	18	Toyota																											KEN; 18	DOV	KAN	CLT	TEX	PHO	HOM	113th	0^{1}	

==== Camping World Truck Series ====
NASCAR Camping World Truck Series results
Year	Team	No.	Make	1	2	3	4	5	6	7	8	9	10	11	12	13	14	15	16	17	18	19	20	21	22	23	24	25	NCWTC	Pts	Ref
2011	Richard Childress Racing	22	Chevy	DAY; 34	PHO; 9	DAR; 28	MAR; 17	NSH; 24	DOV; 6	CLT; 16	KAN; 5	TEX; 5	KEN; 7	IOW; 5	NSH; 10	IRP; 7	POC; 6	MCH; 18	BRI; 6	ATL; 13	CHI; 12	NHA; 11	KEN; 13	LVS; 22	TAL; 20	MAR; 5	TEX; 6	HOM; 5	7th	796	
2012	Richard Childress Racing	22	Chevy	DAY; 18	MAR; 30	CAR; 6	KAN; 14	CLT; 7	DOV; 11	TEX; 3	KEN; 7	IOW; 8	CHI; 15	POC; 1	**MCH**; 7	BRI; 4	ATL; 7	IOW; 13	**KEN**; 4	**LVS**; 3*	TAL; 14	MAR; 3	TEX; 7	PHO; 3	HOM; 3				3rd	789	
2013	Kyle Busch Motorsports	18	Toyota	DAY; 22	MAR; 15	CAR; 13	KAN; 2	CLT; 32	DOV; 8	TEX; 25	KEN; 16	IOW; 9	ELD; 4	POC; 4	MCH; 14	BRI; 11	MSP; 26	IOW; 25	CHI; 23	LVS; 13	TAL; 27	MAR; 12	TEX; 12	PHO; 26	HOM; 27				15th	605	
2014	GMS Racing	21	Chevy	DAY; 32	MAR; 17	KAN; 12	CLT; 12	DOV; 5	TEX; 9	GTW; 11	KEN; 12	IOW; 4	ELD; 14	POC; 3	MCH; 9	BRI; 7	MSP; 13	CHI; 8	NHA; 9	LVS; 10	TAL; 13	MAR; 30	TEX; 6	PHO; 30	HOM; 23				7th	680	

==== Whelen Modified Tour ====
NASCAR Whelen Modified Tour results
Year	Car owner	No.	Make	1	2	3	4	5	6	7	8	9	10	11	12	13	14	15	16	17	18	NWMTC	Pts	Ref
2022	Joey Coulter	02	Chevy	NSM; 25	RCH	RIV; 29	LEE	JEN	MND	RIV	WAL	NHA	CLM	TMP	LGY	OSW	RIV	TMP	MAR; 15			51st	63	
2023	Joey Coulter	02	Chevy	NSM; 14	RCH	MON	RIV	LEE	SEE	RIV	WAL	NHA	LMP	THO	LGY	OSW	MON	RIV	NWS	THO	MAR; 13	48th	61	
2024	Joey Coulter	02	Chevy	NSM; 18	RCH	THO	MON	RIV	SEE	NHA	MON	LMP	THO	OSW	RIV	MON	THO	NWS; 15	MAR; 15			42nd	84	
2025	Joey Coulter	02	Chevy	NSM	THO	NWS; 20	SEE	RIV	WMM	LMP	MON	MON	THO	RCH	OSW	NHA	RIV	THO	MAR; 4			48th	64	
2026	Joey Coulter	02	Chevy	NSM; 15	MAR	THO	SEE	RIV	OXF	SEE	CLM	WMM	MON	THO	NHA	STA	OSW	RIV	THO			51st	29	

=== ARCA Racing Series ===
(key) (Bold – Pole position awarded by qualifying time. Italics – Pole position earned by points standings or practice time. * – Most laps led.)

ARCA Racing Series results
Year	Team	No.	Make	1	2	3	4	5	6	7	8	9	10	11	12	13	14	15	16	17	18	19	20	21	ARSC	Pts	Ref
2009	Coulter Motorsports	16	Chevy	DAY; 23	SLM; 16	CAR; 30	TAL; 8	KEN; 28	TOL; 7	POC; 4	MCH; 5	MFD; 2	**IOW**; 3	KEN; 7	BLN; 5	POC; 12	ISF; 21	CHI; 6	**TOL**; 2	DSF; 3	NJM; 11	SLM; 15	KAN; 7	CAR; 9	4th	5020	
2010	Coulter Motorsports	16	Chevy	DAY; 26	PBE; 6	SLM; 14	TEX; 23	TAL; 15	TOL; 2	POC; 26	MCH; 2	IOW; 14	MFD; 22	POC; 11	BLN; 1	NJM; 2	ISF; 4	CHI; 8	DSF; 16	**TOL**; 5	SLM; 2	KAN; 8	CAR; 15		8th	4535	
2011	Coulter Motorsports	16	Chevy	DAY; 21	TAL; 11	SLM	TOL	NJE	CHI	POC	MCH; 7	WIN	BLN	IOW	IRP; 29	POC	ISF	MAD	DSF	SLM	KAN	TOL			40th	585	
2012	Coulter Motorsports	61	Chevy	DAY; DNQ	MOB	SLM	TAL; 40	TOL; 14	ELK	POC	**MCH**; 9	WIN	NJE	IOW	CHI	IRP	POC	BLN	ISF	MAD	SLM	DSF	KAN		51st	415	

=== CARS Super Late Model Tour ===
(key)

CARS Super Late Model Tour results
Year	Team	No.	Make	1	2	3	4	5	6	7	8	9	10	CSLMTC	Pts	Ref
2015	Coulter Motorsports	2	Ford	SNM	ROU	HCY	SNM	TCM	MMS; 22	ROU	CON	MYB	HCY	61st	11	

=== SMART Modified Tour ===
SMART Modified Tour results
Year	Team	No.	Make	1	2	3	4	5	6	7	8	9	10	11	12	13	14	SMTC	Pts	Ref
2021	Coulter Motorsports	2	N/A	CRW	FLO	SBO	FCS	CRW; 3	DIL	CAR	CRW	DOM	PUL	HCY	ACE			31st	28	
2022	Rum Runner Racing	02NC	Fury	FLO	SNM; 12*	CRW	SBO	FCS	CRW; 1	NWS; 14	NWS; 26	CAR			TRI; 5	PUL		14th	147	
2022	Rum Runner Racing	02	Fury										DOM; 6	HCY; 5				14th	147	
2023	Rum Runner Racing	02	Fury	FLO; 14	CRW; 2	SBO; 5	HCY; 11	FCS; 2	CRW; 4	ACE; 20	CAR; 17	PUL; 9		SBO; 3	ROU; 4			5th	388	
2023	Rum Runner Racing	02C	Fury										TRI; 22					5th	388	
2024	Rum Runner Racing	02	Fury	FLO; 4	CRW; 10	SBO; 12		ROU; 18	HCY; 4	FCS; 4		JAC; 13	CAR; 10	CRW; 15	DOM; 17	SBO; 6	NWS; 9	6th	437	
2024	Rum Runner Racing	2	Fury				TRI; 7				CRW; 10							6th	437	
2025	Rum Runner Racing	02	Fury	FLO; 6	AND; 14	SBO; 19	ROU; 4	HCY; 7	FCS; 12	CRW; 2	CPS; 2	CAR; 4	CRW; 7	DOM; 8	FCS; 8	TRI; 5	**NWS**; 4	5th	480	
2026	Rum Runner Racing	02	Fury	FLO; 12	AND; 19	SBO; 13	DOM; 10	HCY; 7	WKS; 3	FCR; 14	CRW; 18	PUL; 10	CAR; 8	ROU; 10	TRI; 9	NWS; 7		8th	393	

^{1} Ineligible for series points

Achievements
Preceded by Austin Dillon	NASCAR Camping World Truck Series Rookie of the Year; 2011	Succeeded by Ty Dillon
