= Gary Putnam =

American racing driver

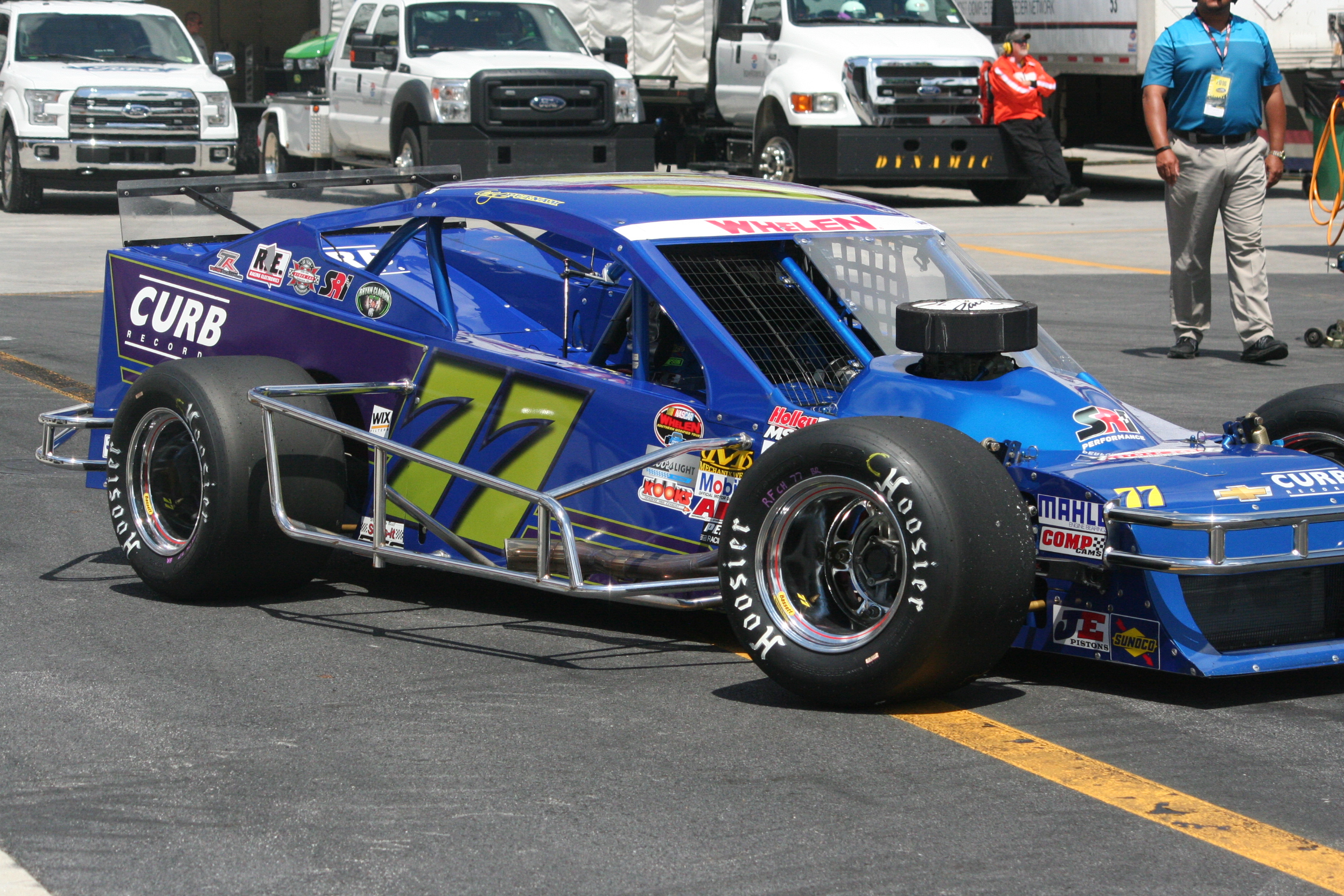
- Putnam's No. 77 car at Bristol Motor Speedway in 2016
- Nationality: American
- Born: February 10, 1970 (age 56) Vernon, Connecticut, U.S.

NASCAR Whelen Modified Tour career
- Debut season: 2014
- Current team: 77
- Years active: 2014–2023, 2025
- Teams: Mike Curb
- Starts: 34
- Championships: 0
- Wins: 0
- Poles: 0
- Best finish: 25th in 2017
- Finished last season: 63rd (2025)
- Statistics up to date as of October 24, 2025.

Gary Putnam (born February 10, 1970) is an American former professional stock car racing driver and crew chief who last competed part-time in the NASCAR Whelen Modified Tour, driving the No. 77 for Mike Curb.

Putnam is a long time crew member in the NASCAR Cup Series, having worked for teams such as Petty Enterprises, PPI Motorsports, Dale Earnhardt Inc, Chip Ganassi Racing, and Trackhouse Racing. He moved to North Carolina from Connecticut with Kevin Manion after starting his career working on the modifieds of Carl and Charlie Pasteryak. In addition to his own driving, he has had drivers such as Ryan Newman, Ryan Preece, Corey LaJoie, Jon McKennedy, Max McLaughlin, and Mike Christopher Jr. pilot his No. 77 modified.

After the 2025 season, Putnam retired from driving to become the series director for the NASCAR Whelen Modified Tour.

Putnam has also competed in series such as the now defunct NASCAR Whelen Southern Modified Tour, the SMART Modified Tour, the Southern Modified Racing Series, the Southern Modified Race Tour, and the World Series of Asphalt Stock Car Racing.

== Motorsports results ==
=== NASCAR ===
(key) (Bold – Pole position awarded by qualifying time. Italics – Pole position earned by points standings or practice time. * – Most laps led.)

==== Whelen Modified Tour ====
NASCAR Whelen Modified Tour results
| Year | Car owner | No. | Make | 1 | 2 | 3 | 4 | 5 | 6 | 7 | 8 | 9 | 10 | 11 | 12 | 13 | 14 | 15 | 16 | 17 | 18 | NWMTC | Pts | Ref |
|---|---|---|---|---|---|---|---|---|---|---|---|---|---|---|---|---|---|---|---|---|---|---|---|---|
| 2014 | Mike Curb | 77 | Chevy | TMP | STA; 23 | STA | WFD | RIV | NHA | MND | STA | TMP | BRI | NHA | STA | TMP | | | | | | 46th | 21 | |
| 2015 | Mike Curb | 77 | Chevy | TMP | STA; 13 | WAT | STA | TMP | RIV | NHA; 28 | MON | STA | TMP | BRI | RIV | NHA | STA | TMP | | | | 44th | 47 | |
| 2016 | Mike Curb | 77 | Chevy | TMP | STA; 20 | WFD | STA | TMP | RIV | | | | | | | | | | | | | 41st | 43 | |
| 2016 | Mike Curb | 7 | Chevy | | | | | | | NHA; 25 | MND | STA | TMP | BRI | RIV | OSW | SEE | NHA | STA | TMP | | 41st | 43 | |
| 2017 | Mike Curb | 77 | Chevy | MYR; 14 | THO | | LGY; 17 | THO; 13 | RIV | NHA | STA; 9 | THO | BRI | SEE | OSW; 14 | RIV | NHA | STA | THO; 11 | | | 25th | 215 | |
| 2017 | Mike Curb | 04 | Chevy | | | STA; 15 | | | | | | | | | | | | | | | | 25th | 215 | |
| 2018 | Mike Curb | 77 | Chevy | MYR; 15 | TMP | STA; 13 | SEE; 17 | TMP | LGY; 14 | RIV | NHA | STA; 16 | TMP; 15 | BRI; 14 | OSW; Wth | RIV | NHA; QL^{†} | STA | TMP; 21 | | | 26th | 228 | |
| 2019 | Mike Curb | 77 | Chevy | MYR; 30 | SBO | TMP; Wth | STA; 14 | WAL | SEE; 20 | TMP | RIV | NHA | STA; 28 | TMP; Wth | OSW; 16 | RIV | NHA; 9 | STA | TMP; 39 | | | 32nd | 152 | |
| 2020 | Mike Curb | 77 | Chevy | JEN | WMM | WMM | JEN; 21 | MND | TMP | NHA; 14 | STA | TMP | | | | | | | | | | 33rd | 53 | |
| 2021 | Mike Curb | 77 | Chevy | MAR | STA | RIV | JEN | OSW | RIV | NHA | NRP | STA | BEE | OSW; 11 | RCH | RIV | STA; 21 | | | | | 42nd | 56 | |
| 2022 | Mike Curb | 77 | Chevy | NSM | RCH | RIV | LEE | JEN | MND | RIV | WAL | NHA | CLM | TMP | LGY; 15 | OSW | RIV | TMP | MAR | | | 61st | 29 | |
| 2023 | Mike Curb | 77 | Chevy | NSM | RCH | MON | RIV | LEE | SEE | RIV | WAL | NHA | LMP | THO | LGY | OSW | MON | RIV | NWS; 31 | THO | MAR | 82nd | 13 | |
| 2025 | Mike Curb | 77 | Chevy | NSM | THO | NWS | SEE | RIV | WMM | LMP | MON | MON | THO | RCH | OSW | NHA; 23 | RIV | THO | MAR | | | 63rd | 21 | |
^{†} - Qualified for Ryan Preece

==== Whelen Southern Modified Tour ====
NASCAR Whelen Southern Modified Tour results
| Year | Car owner | No. | Make | 1 | 2 | 3 | 4 | 5 | 6 | 7 | 8 | 9 | 10 | 11 | 12 | 13 | 14 | NWSMTC | Pts | Ref |
|---|---|---|---|---|---|---|---|---|---|---|---|---|---|---|---|---|---|---|---|---|
| 2010 | Gary Putnam | 7 | Chevy | ATL; 19 | CRW; 13 | | | | | | | | | | | | | 18th | 688 | |
| 2010 | Gary Putnam | 77 | Chevy | | | SBO; 18 | CRW; 10 | BGS | BRI | CRW; 18 | LGY | TRI | CLT; 19 | | | | | 18th | 688 | |
| 2011 | Gary Putnam | 77 | Chevy | CRW; 11 | HCY | SBO | CRW; 11 | CRW | BGS | BRI | CRW | LGY | THO; 16 | TRI | CRW | CLT; 13 | CRW | 21st | 499 | |
| 2012 | Gary Putnam | 77 | Chevy | CRW; 21 | CRW; 18 | SBO; 15 | CRW; 15 | CRW; 12 | BGS; 21 | BRI | LGY; 8 | THO; 14 | CRW; 12 | CLT; 10 | | | | 13th | 294 | |
| 2013 | Gary Putnam | 77 | Chevy | CRW; 6 | SNM; 18 | SBO; 8 | CRW; 10 | CRW; 5 | BGS; 9 | BRI; 8 | LGY; 10 | CRW; 8 | CRW; 9 | SNM | CLT; 21 | | | 12th | 372 | |
| 2014 | Mike Curb | 77 | Chevy | CRW; 12 | SNM; 7 | SBO; 8 | LGY; 10 | CRW; 6 | BGS; 7 | BRI; 11 | LGY; 8 | CRW; 10 | SBO; 11 | SNM; 13 | CRW; 14 | CRW; 11 | CLT; 12 | 8th | 477 | |
| 2015 | Mike Curb | 77 | Chevy | CRW; 7 | CRW; 9 | SBO; 9 | LGY; 9 | CRW; 6 | BGS; 11 | **BRI**; 6 | LGY; 12 | SBO; 14 | CLT; 14 | | | | | 8th | 343 | |
| 2016 | Mike Curb | 77 | Chevy | CRW; 14 | CON; 9 | SBO; 6 | CRW; 11 | CRW; 9 | BGS; 5 | | ECA; 12 | SBO; 16 | CRW | CLT | | | | 10th | 310 | |
| 2016 | Mike Curb | 77S | Chevy | | | | | | | BRI; 5 | | | | | | | | 10th | 310 | |

=== SMART Modified Tour ===
SMART Modified Tour results
| Year | Car owner | No. | Make | 1 | 2 | 3 | 4 | 5 | 6 | 7 | 8 | 9 | 10 | 11 | 12 | 13 | 14 | SMTC | Pts | Ref |
|---|---|---|---|---|---|---|---|---|---|---|---|---|---|---|---|---|---|---|---|---|
| 2021 | Mike Curb | 77 | N/A | CRW; 11 | FLO; 4 | SBO | FCS; 15 | **CRW**; 1 | DIL; 11 | CAR | CRW; 14 | DOM | PUL; 8 | HCY | ACE | | | 12th | 158 | |
| 2022 | Mike Curb | 77 | N/A | FLO | SNM | CRW; 7 | SBO | FCS; 10 | CRW; 9 | NWS | NWS | CAR; 3 | DOM; 17 | HCY; 9 | TRI; 7 | PUL | | 12th | 157 | |
| 2023 | Mike Curb | 77 | N/A | FLO; 7 | CRW | SBO | HCY; 9 | FCS | CRW | ACE | CAR | PUL | TRI; 13 | SBO | ROU | | | 31st | 94 | |
| 2024 | Mike Curb | 77 | N/A | FLO; 22 | | | | ROU; 13 | HCY | FCS | CRW; 16 | JAC | CAR | CRW | DOM | SBO | NWS | 27th | 94 | |
| 2024 | Mike Curb | 77P | N/A | | CRW; 19 | SBO | TRI | | | | | | | | | | | 27th | 94 | |
| 2025 | Mike Curb | 77 | N/A | FLO | AND | SBO | ROU | HCY; 16 | FCS | CRW; 20 | CPS | CAR | CRW | DOM | FCS | TRI; 17 | NWS | 30th | 70 | |
