= Jonathan Brown (racing driver) =

American racing driver

- Nationality: American
- Born: August 30, 1982 (age 44) Winston-Salem, North Carolina, U.S.

NASCAR Whelen Southern Modified Tour career
- Debut season: 2005
- Years active: 2005–2009
- Starts: 12
- Championships: 0
- Wins: 0
- Poles: 0
- Best finish: 17th in 2009
- Statistics up to date as of September 20, 2026.

Jonathan "JonBoy" Brown (born August 30, 1982) is an American professional stock car racing driver who competed in the now defunct NASCAR Whelen Southern Modified Tour from 2005 to 2009.

Brown has previously competed in series such as the SMART Modified Tour, where he is a multi-time race winner, the 602 Modified Tour, the ASA Southern Modified Race Tour, and the NASCAR Local Racing Series, and a regular competitor at Bowman Gray Stadium, where has won multiple times in the modified division.

== Motorsports results ==
=== NASCAR ===
(key) (Bold – Pole position awarded by qualifying time. Italics – Pole position earned by points standings or practice time. * – Most laps led.)

==== Whelen Southern Modified Tour ====
NASCAR Whelen Southern Modified Tour results
Year	Car owner	No.	Make	1	2	3	4	5	6	7	8	9	10	11	12	13	14	NWSMTC	Pts	Ref
2005	N/A	68	Chevy	CRW	CRW	CRW	CRW	BGS	MAR	ACE	ACE	CRW	CRW	SNM	ACE; 15			N/A	0	
2006	Jonathan Brown	00	Chevy	CRW; 17	GRE	CRW	DUB	CRW	BGS; 13	MAR	CRW	ACE	CRW					30th	357	
2006	Melvin Swisher	53	Chevy											HCY; 14	DUB	SNM		30th	357	
2007	Melvin Swisher	53	Dodge	CRW	FAI	GRE; 23	CRW	CRW	BGS; 21	MAR	ACE	CRW	SNM	CRW	CRW			37th	194	
2008	Melvin Swisher	53	Dodge	CRW	ACE; 16	CRW	BGS; 20	CRW	LAN	CRW	SNM	MAR	CRW	CRW				30th	218	
2009	Bryan Fishel	44	Chevy	CON	SBO	CRW	LAN	CRW	BGS	BRI	CRW	MBS	CRW	CRW; 8	MAR; 25	ACE; 13	CRW; 9	17th	550	

=== SMART Modified Tour ===
SMART Modified Tour results
Year	Car owner	No.	Make	1	2	3	4	5	6	7	8	9	10	11	12	13	SMTC	Pts	Ref
2021	N/A	24	N/A	CRW	FLO	SBO	FCS	CRW	DIL	CAR; 4	CRW; 1*	DOM	PUL; 7	HCY			19th	86	
2021	N/A	22B	N/A												ACE; 1		19th	86	
2022	Sadler-Stanley Racing	22	N/A	FLO; 5	**SNM**; 11	**CRW**; 10	SBO; 2	FCS; 1*	CRW; 25	NWS		CAR; 5	DOM; 16	HCY; 7	TRI; 16	PUL; 2	6th	266	
2022	Sadler-Stanley Racing	39	N/A								NWS; 10						6th	266	
2023	N/A	24	PSR	FLO; 5	CRW; 6	SBO; 24	HCY; 4	FCS; 19	CRW; 21	ACE	CAR	PUL	TRI	SBO	ROU		21st	168	
2026	Buddy Ellis	24	N/A	FLO	AND	SBO	DOM	HCY	WKS	FCR	CRW	PUL	CAR	ROU; 12	TRI; 11	NWS; 9	27th	91	
