= Timmy Catalano =

American racing driver (born 2000)

- Nationality: American
- Born: March 2, 2000 (age 26) Ontario, New York, U.S.

NASCAR Whelen Modified Tour career
- Years active: 2019–2021, 2026–present
- Starts: 24
- Championships: 0
- Wins: 0
- Poles: 1
- Best finish: 17th in 2019
- Finished last season: 49th (2026)
- Statistics up to date as of October 12, 2026.

Timmy Catalano (born March 2, 2000) is an American professional stock car racing driver who currently competes part-time in the NASCAR Whelen Modified Tour, driving the No. 45 for Catalano Motorsports. He is the younger brother of Tommy Catalano and the older brother of Trevor Catalano and Tyler Catalano, who all currently compete in the Modified Tour.

Catalano has previously competed in series such as the Race of Champions Super Stocks Series, the New York Super Stocks Race Series, the Race of Champions Asphalt Modified Tour, the Indoor Auto Racing Championship, and the World Series of Asphalt Stock Car Racing.

== Motorsports results ==
=== NASCAR ===
(key) (Bold – Pole position awarded by qualifying time. Italics – Pole position earned by points standings or practice time. * – Most laps led.)

==== Whelen Modified Tour ====
NASCAR Whelen Modified Tour results
Year	Car owner	No.	Make	1	2	3	4	5	6	7	8	9	10	11	12	13	14	15	16	NWMTC	Pts	Ref
2019	Amy Catalano	45	Chevy	MYR; 24	SBO; 27	TMP; 22													TMP; 34	17th	360	
2019	Dave Catalano	45	Chevy				STA; 13	WAL; 4	SEE; 21	TMP; 22	RIV; 24	NHA; 32	STA; 19	TMP; 17	OSW; 27	RIV; 14	NHA; 15	STA; 30		17th	360	
2020	David Catalano	45	Ford	JEN; 30																25th	137	
2020	David Catalano	45	Chevy		WMM; 19	WMM; 16	JEN; 14	MND; 26	TMP	NHA; 20	STA	TMP								25th	137	
2021	David Catalano	45	Chevy	MAR	STA	RIV	JEN; 14	OSW	RIV	NHA	NRP	STA	BEE	OSW	RCH	RIV	STA			52nd	30	
2026	Tyler Catalano	45	Chevy	NSM	MAR	THO	SEE	RIV	OXF	SEE	CLM	WMM	MON	THO	NHA	STA	OSW; 13	RIV	THO	49th	31	
