= Jonathan Cash =

American racing driver

- Born: December 19, 1980 (age 45); Oxford, North Carolina, U.S.

ARCA Menards Series East career
- 1 race run over 1 year
- Best finish: 65th (2007)
- First race: 2007 South Boston 150 (South Boston)
Wins	Top tens	Poles
0	0	0
- Statistics up to date as of April 22, 2025.

Jonathan Cash (born December 19, 1980) is an American professional stock car racing driver who competes in the SMART Modified Tour, driving for Hill Enterprises, having previously driven for Sadler-Stanley Racing. He previously competed in the NASCAR Busch East Series.

Before the 2026 season, Cash competed in Kaulig Racing's "Race For the Seat", competing against 14 other drivers to try to win a full-season ride in the team's No. 14 truck.

Cash has also competed in the now defunct X-1R Pro Cup Series, the Southeast Limited Late Model Series, the Virginia Late Model Triple Crown Series, and the Dirty Dozen Series.

== Motorsports results ==
=== NASCAR ===
(key) (Bold – Pole position awarded by qualifying time. Italics – Pole position earned by points standings or practice time. * – Most laps led.)

==== Camping World East Series ====
NASCAR Busch East Series results
Year	Team	No.	Make	1	2	3	4	5	6	7	8	9	10	11	12	13	NBEC	Pts	Ref
2007	Chip Lofton	59	Ford	GRE; DNQ	ELK	IOW	SBO; 29	STA	NHA	TMP	NSH	ADI	LRP	MFD	NHA	DOV	65th	107	

=== SMART Modified Tour ===
SMART Modified Tour results
Year	Car owner	No.	Make	1	2	3	4	5	6	7	8	9	10	11	12	13	14	SMTC	Pts	Ref
2022	N/A	39	PSR	FLO	SNM	CRW	SBO	FCS	CRW	NWS	NWS	CAR	DOM	HCY; 17	TRI	PUL		49th	14	
2023	N/A	39VA	PSR	FLO	CRW; 10				CRW; 15	ACE	CAR	PUL						18th	186	
2023	N/A	39V	PSR			SBO; 4	HCY	FCS										18th	186	
2023	N/A	39	PSR										TRI; 9	SBO; 11				18th	186	
2023	N/A	16	N/A												ROU; 12			18th	186	
2024	Sadler-Stanley Racing	16VA	N/A	FLO; 16		SBO; 4	TRI; 15		HCY; 9	FCS; 14		JAC; 10	CAR; 2				NWS; 28	9th	408	
2024	Sadler-Stanley Racing	16	N/A		CRW; 14			ROU; 3			CRW; 12			CRW; 12	DOM; 7			9th	408	
2024	Sadler-Stanley Racing	11VA	N/A													SBO; 24		9th	408	
2025	Sadler-Stanley Racing	16VA	N/A	FLO; 10	AND; 10			HCY; 10	FCS; 10	CRW; 25	CPS; 1	CAR; 11	CRW; 2	DOM; 13	FCS; 10	TRI; 20	NWS; 25	9th	399	
2025	Sadler-Stanley Racing	16V	N/A			SBO; 29												9th	399	
2025	Sadler-Stanley Racing	16	N/A				ROU; 6											9th	399	
2026	Hill Enterprises	79	N/A	FLO; 19	AND; 10	SBO; DNS	DOM; 14	HCY; 15	WKS; 10	FCR; 20	CRW	PUL	CAR					17th	200	
2026	Sadler-Stanley Racing	16VA	N/A											ROU; 8	TRI	NWS		17th	200	
