= Jonathan Kievman =

American racing driver

- Nationality: American
- Born: January 12, 1961 (age 65) Deerfield Beach, Florida, U.S.

NASCAR Whelen Southern Modified Tour career
- Debut season: 2010
- Years active: 2010–2012
- Starts: 19
- Championships: 0
- Wins: 0
- Poles: 0
- Best finish: 13th in 2011
- Statistics up to date as of April 22, 2025.

Jonathan "Jonny Kay" Kievman (born January 12, 1961) is an American professional stock car racing driver who competed in the now defunct NASCAR Whelen Southern Modified Tour from 2010 to 2012.

Kievman has previously competed in series such as the SMART Modified Tour, the FASCAR Sunbelt Super Late Model Series, the Carolina Pro Late Model Series, and the Florida Pro Series.

== Motorsports results ==
=== NASCAR ===
(key) (Bold – Pole position awarded by qualifying time. Italics – Pole position earned by points standings or practice time. * – Most laps led.)

==== Whelen Modified Tour ====
NASCAR Whelen Modified Tour results
Year	Car owner	No.	Make	1	2	3	4	5	6	7	8	9	10	11	12	13	14	NWMTC	Pts	Ref
2010	Jonathan Kievman	08	Chevy	TMP	STA	STA	MAR; 35	NHA	LIM	MND	RIV	STA	TMP	BRI	NHA	STA	TMP	57th	58	

==== Whelen Southern Modified Tour ====
NASCAR Whelen Southern Modified Tour results
Year	Car owner	No.	Make	1	2	3	4	5	6	7	8	9	10	11	12	13	14	NWSMTC	Pts	Ref
2010	Jonathan Kievman	18	Chevy	ATL; 15	CRW													17th	696	
2010	Jonathan Kievman	8	Chevy			SBO; 22	CRW; 20	BGS	BRI	CRW; 10	LGY	TRI; 19	CLT; 9					17th	696	
2011	Jonathan Kievman	8	Chevy	CRW; 15	HCY; 17	SBO	CRW; 17	CRW; 10	BGS; 14	BRI	CRW	LGY; 10	THO	TRI; 14	CRW	CLT; 18	CRW	13th	966	
2012	Jonathan Kievman	48	Chevy	CRW; 18	CRW													20th	154	
2012	Jonathan Kievman	48	Pontiac			SBO; 13	CRW	CRW										20th	154	
2012	Tammi North	48	Chevy						BGS; 18	BRI; 5	LGY	THO	CRW	CLT; 12				20th	154	

=== SMART Modified Tour ===
SMART Modified Tour results
Year	Car owner	No.	Make	1	2	3	4	5	6	7	8	9	10	11	12	13	14	SMTC	Pts	Ref
2021	Jonathan Kievman	48	Troyer	CRW; 10	FLO	SBO; 18	FCS	CRW; DNS	DIL	CAR	CRW	DOM	PUL	HCY	ACE			29th	34	
2022	Jonathan Kievman	48	Troyer	FLO; 14	SNM; 17	CRW; 22	SBO	FCS; 19	CRW; 12	NWS	NWS	CAR	DOM	HCY	TRI; 9	PUL		18th	93	
2023	Jonathan Kievman	48	Troyer	FLO	CRW	SBO; 22	HCY; 12	FCS; 9	CRW; 17	ACE; 19	CAR; 14	PUL	TRI; 17	SBO	ROU; 14			17th	204	
2024	Jonathan Kievman	48	Troyer	FLO	CRW; 25	SBO	TRI; 17	ROU; 16	HCY; 17	FCS; 20	CRW	JAC; 24	CAR; 6	CRW	DOM	SBO; 23	NWS; 12	18th	209	
2025	Jonathan Kievman	48	Troyer	FLO; 17	AND; 12	SBO; 27	ROU; 16	HCY; 18	FCS; 11	CRW	CPS; 17	CAR; 18	CRW	DOM	FCS	TRI	NWS	17th	196	
2026	Jonathan Kievman	48	Troyer	FLO	AND	SBO	DOM	HCY	WKS	FCR	CRW	PUL	CAR; 20	ROU; 25	TRI; 24	NWS; 8		28th	87	
