= 2023 SMART Modified Tour =

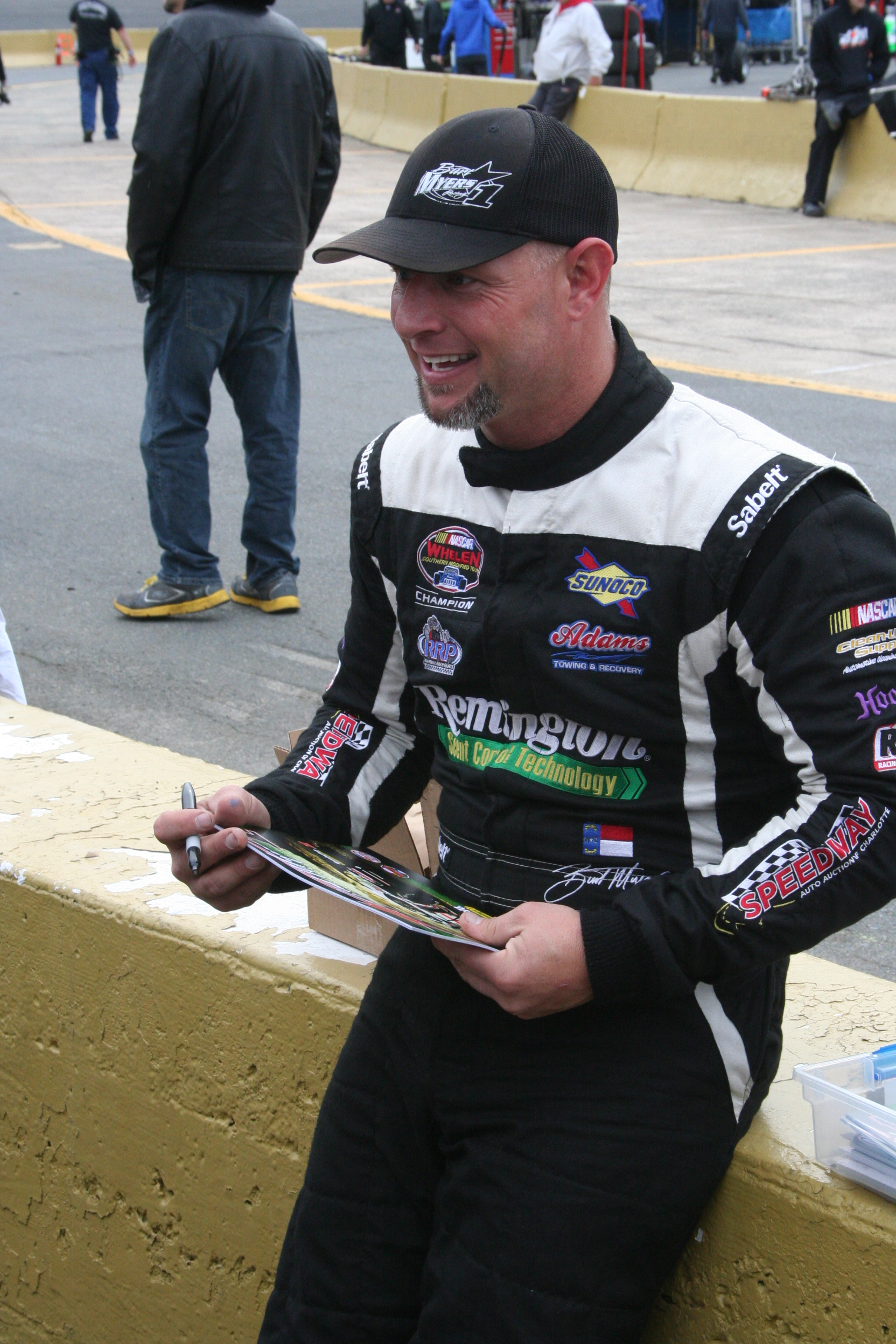
Burt Myers, the 2023 SMART Modified Tour champion.

The 2023 SMART Modified Tour was the 19th season of the SMART Modified Tour. It began with the Low Country 99 at Florence Motor Speedway on March 4. It ended with the Rumble at Rougemont at Orange County Speedway on October 28. Burt Myers won his third championship in the series, 54 points ahead of series runner up Brandon Ward.

== Schedule ==
No.	Race title	Track	Date
1	Low Country 99	Florence Motor Speedway, Timmonsville, South Carolina	March 4
2	Warrior 100	Caraway Speedway, Asheboro, North Carolina	March 25
3	Flying VA Classic	South Boston Speedway, South Boston, Virginia	April 1
4	Hickory Hundred	Hickory Motor Speedway, Hickory, North Carolina	April 15
5	Kenny Minter Classic	Franklin County Speedway, Callaway, Virginia	May 26
6	Revolutionary 99	Caraway Speedway, Asheboro, North Carolina	July 1
7	Robert Jeffreys Memorial	Ace Speedway, Altamahaw, North Carolina	August 25
8	Carteret Clash	Carteret Motor Speedway, Swansboro, North Carolina	September 2
9	Radford Race	Pulaski County Motorsports Park, Radford, Virginia	October 1
10	Cardinal 99	Tri-County Motor Speedway, Hudson, North Carolina	October 7
11	Pace-O-Matic 99	South Boston Speedway, South Boston, Virginia	October 15
12	Rumble at Rougemont	Orange County Speedway, Rougemont, North Carolina	October 28

== Results and standings ==
=== Races ===
No.	Race	Pole position	Most laps led	Winning driver
1	Low Country 99	Caleb Heady	Caleb Heady	Matt Hirschman
2	Warrior 100	Bobby Measmer Jr.	Burt Myers	Brandon Ward
3	Flying VA Classic	Caleb Heady	Brian Loftin	Brian Loftin
4	Hickory Hundred	Spencer Davis	Caleb Heady	Caleb Heady
5	Kenny Minter Classic	Tim Brown	N/A	Burt Myers
6	Revolutionary 99	Burt Myers	Burt Myers	Burt Myers
7	Robert Jeffreys Memorial	Ryan Newman	N/A	Burt Myers
8	Carteret Clash	Tim Brown	N/A	Brandon Ward
9	Radford Race	Matt Hirschman	N/A	Sam Rameau
10	Cardinal 99	Jason Myers	Bobby Labonte	Bobby Labonte
11	Pace-O-Matic 99	Andy Jankowiak	Carson Loftin	Andy Jankowiak
12	Rumble at Rougemont	Jason Myers	N/A	Bobby Labonte

=== Drivers' championship ===
(key) Bold - Pole position awarded by time. Italics - Pole position set by final practice results or rainout. * – Most laps led.

Pos	Driver	FLO	CRW	SBO	HCY	FCS	CRW	ACE	CAR	PUL	TRI	SBO	ROU	Points
1	Burt Myers	3	7*	3	3	1	1*	1	5	7	5	7	10	502
2	Brandon Ward	4	1	6	8	3	16	4	1	4	12	18	3	448
3	Carson Loftin	11	16	14	2	8	7	5	7	5	6	2*	21	407
4	Bobby Labonte	9	11	21	7	4	6	6	4	18	1*	6	1	412
5	Joey Coulter	14	2	5	11	2	4	20	17	9	22	3	4	388
6	Tim Brown	13	4	9	24	**13**	2	12	**8**	8	10	5	8	387
7	Brian Loftin	16	8	1*	13	7	5	17	20	13	3	15	5	385
8	Jason Myers	8	14	10	14	15	12	10	26	15	**8**	8	**11**	341
9	Caleb Heady	**2***	15	**12**	1*	6	23	16	3	16	11	21		340
10	Jeremy Gerstner	18	17	8	20	11	18	9	11	10	19	12	13	334
11	Bobby Measmer Jr.	15	**3**	11	15	14	8	3	21		2	9		313
12	Daniel Yates		9	13	17	18	14	25	12	12	16	17	20	278
13	Dennis Holdren	17	19	16	19	10	22	13	9	24	21	20		263
14	Ryan Newman	6			5	5		**2**	2	17			2	254
15	Jimmy Wallace	24	13	20	27		9	18	24	21	15	16	16	248
16	Tom Buzze			2	23		10	11		DNS	7	4		206
17	Jonathan Kievman			22	12	9	17	19	14		17		14	204
18	Jonathan Cash		10	4			15				9	11	12	186
19	Gary Young Jr.	10	18	23				21	15	14	24	19		184
20	Brian Weber	22	23	17	29	20		22	16		23		15	182
21	Jonathan Brown	5	6	24	4	19	21							168
22	Zach Brewer	12	5	27			24	8	19					147
23	Jason Tutterow	20	21	26	22		25		22				18	133
24	Michael Ritch	19		7	16			23		20				123
25	Matt Hirschman	1		15						**2**				114
26	Jake Crum				25		13				4	10		112
27	Riley Neal	23	12	25	18				18					110
28	Danny Bohn								6		14		6	101
29	Chris Finocchario			19						11		14	19	101
30	Wes Gilbert			18	26	12			25	23				101
31	Gary Putnam	7			9						13			94
32	Cody Norman		24		21			14	13					92
33	John Smith				6	21	11							85
34	Dwight Sauls	21	22			16			23					82
35	Spencer Davis				**10**			7						65
36	Jason Poole		20		28		19							56
37	Sam Rameau									1				50
38	Bussy Beavers						20	15						47
39	Andy Jankowiak											**1**		46
40	Andrew Krause									3				38
41	Ronnie Williams						3							38
42	Cayden Lapcevich												7	36
43	Stephen Kopcik									6				35
44	Tommy Catalano												9	32
45	Justin Gumley								10					31
46	Tyler Barry											13		28
47	James Civali					17								25
48	Trevor Catalano												17	24
49	Spencer Martin										18			23
50	Paul Hall									19				22
51	Eric Zeh										20			21
52	Tim Connolly									22				19
53	Lee Jeffreys							24						17
54	Brittney Zamora						26							15
Pos	Driver	FLO	CRW	SBO	HCY	FCS	CRW	ACE	CAR	PUL	TRI	SBO	ROU	Points

== See also ==
- 2023 NASCAR Cup Series
- 2023 NASCAR Xfinity Series
- 2023 NASCAR Craftsman Truck Series
- 2023 ARCA Menards Series
- 2023 ARCA Menards Series East
- 2023 ARCA Menards Series West
- 2023 NASCAR Whelen Modified Tour
- 2023 NASCAR Pinty's Series
- 2023 NASCAR Mexico Series
- 2023 NASCAR Whelen Euro Series
- 2023 NASCAR Brasil Sprint Race
- 2023 SRX Series
- 2023 CARS Tour
- 2023 ASA STARS National Tour
