= Dennis Holdren =

American racing driver (born 1965)

- Nationality: American
- Born: August 16, 1965 (age 61) Roanoke, Virginia, U.S.

SMART Modified Tour career
- Debut season: 2021
- Years active: 2021–2023
- Starts: 35
- Championships: 0
- Wins: 0
- Poles: 0
- Best finish: 7th in 2021
- Finished last season: 13th (2023)
- Statistics up to date as of April 26, 2025.

Dennis Holdren (born August 16, 1965) is an American professional stock car racing driver who has previously competed in the SMART Modified Tour.

Holdren has also competed in series such as the Dirty Dozen Series, the Virginia Late Model Triple Crown Series, the Carolina Mini Stock Challenge, and the NASCAR Weekly Series.

== Motorsports results ==
=== SMART Modified Tour ===
SMART Modified Tour results
Year	Car owner	No.	Make	1	2	3	4	5	6	7	8	9	10	11	12	13	SMTC	Pts	Ref
2021	N/A	07	LFR	CRW; 17	FLO; 9	SBO; 4	FCS; 13	CRW; 9	DIL; 12	CAR; 10	CRW; 10	DOM; 10	PUL; 15	HCY; 13			7th	219	
2021	N/A	07VA	LFR												ACE; 13		7th	219	
2022	N/A	07H	LFR	FLO; 12													9th	208	
2022	N/A	07	LFR		SNM; 20		SBO; 14										9th	208	
2022	N/A	07VA	LFR			CRW; 9		FCS; 6	CRW; 3	NWS	NWS	CAR; 13	DOM; 11	HCY; 25	TRI; 10	PUL; 15	9th	208	
2023	N/A	07VA	LFR	FLO; 17	CRW; 19	SBO; 16	HCY; 19	FCS; 10	CRW; 22	ACE; 13	CAR; 9		TRI; 21				13th	263	
2023	N/A	07V	LFR									PUL; 24					13th	263	
2023	N/A	07	LFR											SBO; 20	ROU		13th	263	
