= Tyler Catalano =

American racing driver (born 2004)

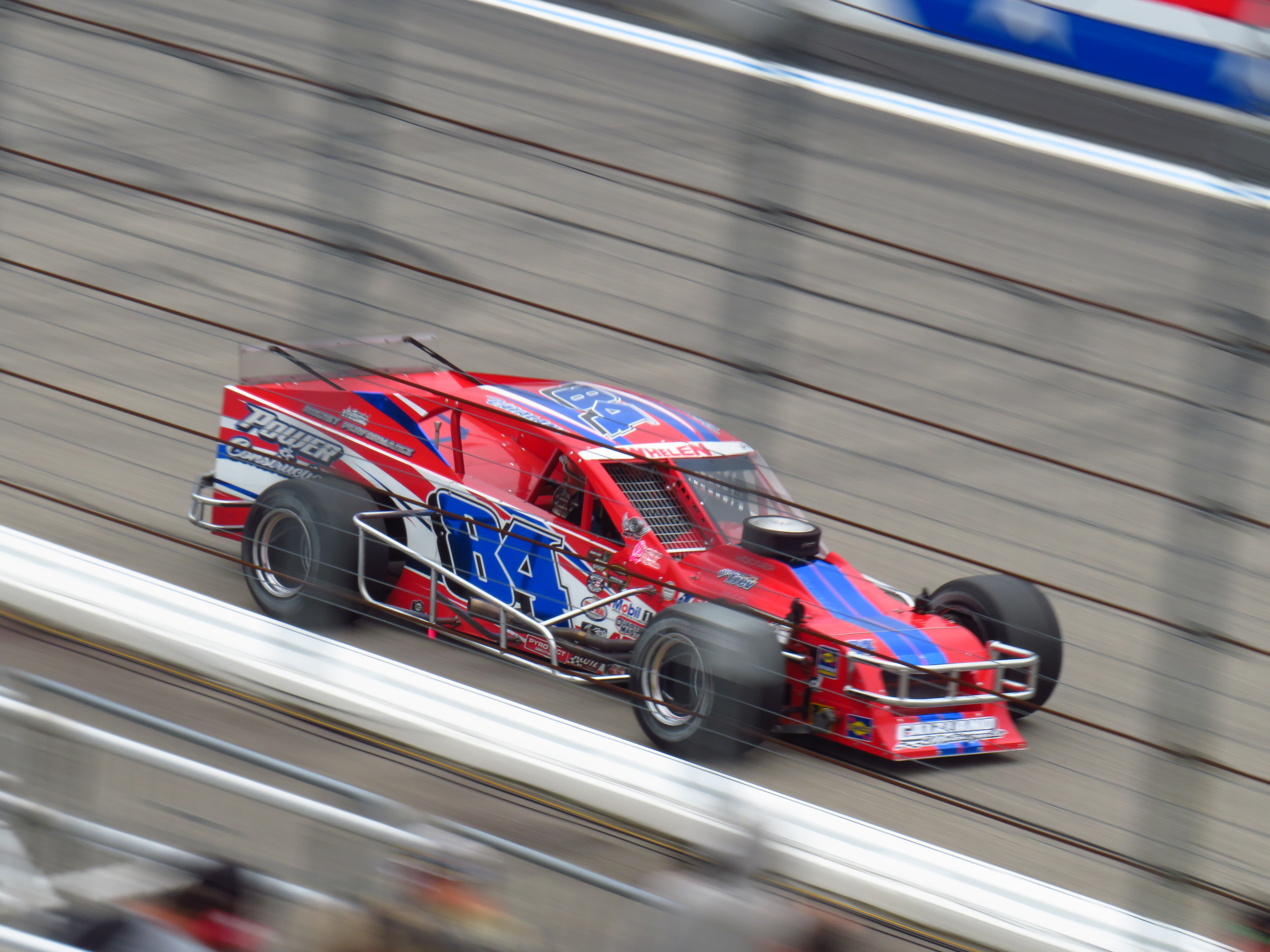
- Catalano's No. 84 car at New Hampshire Motor Speedway in 2024
- Nationality: American
- Born: May 18, 2004 (age 22) Ontario, New York, U.S.

NASCAR Whelen Modified Tour career
- Debut season: 2023
- Years active: 2023–present
- Starts: 20
- Championships: 0
- Wins: 0
- Poles: 0
- Best finish: 13th in 2024
- Finished last season: 55th (2026)
- Statistics up to date as of October 12, 2026.

Tyler Catalano (born May 18, 2004) is an American professional stock car racing driver who currently competes part-time in the NASCAR Whelen Modified Tour, driving the No. 84 for Allie Catalano. He is the older brother of Trevor Catalano and the younger brother of Tommy Catalano, who also compete in the Modified Tour.

Catalano has previously competed in series such as the Race of Champions Four Cylinder Dash Series, the Race of Champions Asphalt Modified Tour, the Race of Champions Asphalt Sportsman Modified Series, and the World Series of Asphalt Stock Car Racing.

In December 2023, it was revealed that Catalano would compete full-time in the NASCAR Whelen Modified Tour in 2024, driving alongside brothers Trevor and Tommy, thus becoming the second time where at least two members of the Catalano family have raced full-time in the series since 2019, where Tommy and Timmy competed full-time.

== Motorsports results ==
=== NASCAR ===
(key) (Bold – Pole position awarded by qualifying time. Italics – Pole position earned by points standings or practice time. * – Most laps led.)

==== Whelen Modified Tour ====
NASCAR Whelen Modified Tour results
Year	Car owner	No.	Make	1	2	3	4	5	6	7	8	9	10	11	12	13	14	15	16	17	18	NWMTC	Pts	Ref
2023	Amy Catalano	84	Chevy	NSM	RCH	MON	RIV	LEE	SEE	RIV	WAL	NHA	LMP	THO	LGY	OSW; 10	MON	RIV	NWS	THO	MAR	68th	34	
2024	David Catalano	84	Chevy	NSM; 27	RCH; 15	THO; 17	MON; 14	RIV; 14	SEE; 21	NHA; 18	MON; 15	LMP; 19	THO; 19	OSW; 18	RIV; 12	MON; 19	THO; 17	NWS	MAR; 20			13th	395	
2025	Allie Catalano	84	Chevy	NSM; 18	THO	NWS	SEE	RIV	WMM	LMP; 12	MON	MON	THO	RCH	OSW; 17	NHA	RIV	THO	MAR			38th	85	
2026	Allie Catalano	84	Chevy	NSM	MAR	THO	SEE	RIV	OXF; 18	SEE	CLM	WMM	MON	THO	NHA; Wth	STA	OSW	RIV	THO			55th	26	
