= Tommy Catalano =

American racing driver (born 1998)

- Born: March 13, 1998 (age 28) Ontario, New York, U.S.

NASCAR Whelen Modified Tour career
- Debut season: 2018
- Current team: Catalano Motorsports
- Years active: 2018–present
- Car number: 54
- Crew chief: Rick Kluth
- Starts: 119
- Championships: 0
- Wins: 1
- Poles: 1
- Best finish: 7th in 2022
- Finished last season: 12th (2026)
- Statistics up to date as of October 12, 2026.

Tommy Catalano (born March 13, 1998) is an American professional stock car racing driver who competes part-time in the NASCAR Whelen Modified Tour, driving the No. 54 for Catalano Motorsports. He is the older brother of Trevor Catalano and Tyler Catalano, who also compete in the Modified Tour.

In 2025, Catalano got his first career win in the Whelen Modified Tour at Monadnock Speedway.

Catalano has previously competed in series such as the Race of Champions Late Model Series, the SMART Modified Tour, the Indoor Auto Racing Championship, and the World Series of Asphalt Stock Car Racing.

== Motorsports results ==
=== NASCAR ===
(key) (Bold – Pole position awarded by qualifying time. Italics – Pole position earned by points standings or practice time. * – Most laps led.)

==== Whelen Modified Tour ====
NASCAR Whelen Modified Tour results
Year	Car owner	No.	Make	1	2	3	4	5	6	7	8	9	10	11	12	13	14	15	16	17	18	NWMTC	Pts	Ref
2018	Amy Catalano	54	Chevy	MYR; Wth	TMP; 15		SEE; 8	TMP; 22	LGY; 23	RIV; 12	NHA; 18	STA; 19	TMP; 20	BRI; 12	OSW; 10	RIV; 12	NHA; 15	STA; 15	TMP; 19			11th	424	
2018	David Catalano	54	Chevy			STA; 16																11th	424	
2019	Amy Catalano	54	Chevy	MYR; 26	**SBO**; 17	TMP; 18	STA; 17	WAL; 9	SEE; 14	TMP; 11	RIV; 10	NHA; 9	STA; 17	TMP; 26	OSW; 10	RIV; 12	NHA; 29	STA; 15	TMP; 11			11th	457	
2020	Zachary Reissner	54	Chevy	JEN; 32	WMM; 4		JEN; 23	MND; 16	TMP	NHA; 24	STA	TMP; 23										21st	162	
2020	David Catalano	54	Chevy			WMM; 24																21st	162	
2021	David Catalano	54	Chevy	MAR; 7	STA; 3	RIV; 11	JEN; 9	OSW; 15	RIV; 6	NHA; 22	NRP; 17	STA; 10	BEE; 18	OSW; 21	RCH; Wth	RIV	STA					12th	345	
2022	David Catalano	54	Chevy	NSM; 8	RCH; 2	RIV; 12	LEE; 11	JEN; 5	MND; 9	RIV; 14	WAL; 12	NHA; 20	CLM; 7	TMP; 15	LGY; 6	OSW; 17	RIV; 12	TMP; 15	MAR; 9			7th	534	
2023	David Catalano	54	Chevy	NSM; 10	RCH; 23	MON; 18	RIV	LEE; 10	SEE	RIV	WAL	NHA; 21	LMP; 6	THO	LGY	OSW; 9	MON	RIV	NWS; 20	THO	MAR; 12	18th	270	
2024	Timmy Catalano	54	Chevy	NSM; 30	RCH; 10	THO; 13	MON; 12	RIV; 22	SEE; 13	NHA; 6	MON; 9	LMP; 5	THO; 5	OSW; 7	RIV; 10	MON; 9	THO; 15	NWS	MAR; 23			9th	472	
2025	David Catalano	54	Chevy	NSM; 14	THO; 9	NWS; 7	SEE; 23	RIV; 7	WMM; 20	LMP; 11	MON; 1	MON; 10	THO; 17	RCH; 22	OSW; 16	NHA; 22	RIV; 10	THO; 17	MAR; 20			10th	484	
2026	David Catalano	54	Chevy	NSM; 17	MAR; 8	THO; 19	SEE; 5	RIV; 4	OXF; 13	SEE; 15	CLM; 12	WMM; 13	MON; 5	THO; 11	NHA; 2	STA; 18	OSW; 17	RIV	THO			12th	459	

=== SMART Modified Tour ===
SMART Modified Tour results
Year	Car owner	No.	Make	1	2	3	4	5	6	7	8	9	10	11	12	SMTC	Pts	Ref
2023	N/A	54	N/A	FLO	CRW	SBO	HCY	FCS	CRW	ACE	CAR	PUL	TRI	SBO	ROU; 8	44th	32	

=== ASA STARS National Tour ===
(key) (Bold – Pole position awarded by qualifying time. Italics – Pole position earned by points standings or practice time. * – Most laps led. ** – All laps led.)

ASA STARS National Tour results
Year	Team	No.	Make	1	2	3	4	5	6	7	8	9	10	ASNTC	Pts	Ref
2024	Joe Brainard	54T	N/A	NSM; DNQ	FIF	HCY	MAD	MLW	AND	OWO	TOL	WIN	NSV	101st	20	
