= Amy Catalano =

American racing driver (born 1972)

- Born: July 14, 1972 (age 54) Ontario, New York, United States

NASCAR Whelen Modified Tour career
- Years active: 2019–2020
- Starts: 8
- Championships: 0
- Wins: 0
- Poles: 1
- Best finish: 29th in 2020
- Statistics up to date as of May 23, 2025.

Amy Catalano (born July 14, 1972) is an American professional stock car racing driver who competed in the NASCAR Whelen Modified Tour from 2019 to 2020. She is the mother of Tommy, Trevor, Tyler, and Timmy Catalano, who have all competed in the Modified Tour.

Catalano has previously competed in series such as the Modified Racing Series, the Race of Champions Asphalt Modified Tour, the Race of Champions Asphalt Sportsman Modified Series, and the World Series of Asphalt Stock Car Racing.

== Motorsports results ==
=== NASCAR ===
(key) (Bold – Pole position awarded by qualifying time. Italics – Pole position earned by points standings or practice time. * – Most laps led.)

==== Whelen Modified Tour ====
NASCAR Whelen Modified Tour results
Year	Car owner	No.	Make	1	2	3	4	5	6	7	8	9	10	11	12	13	14	15	16	NWMTC	Pts	Ref
2019	Allie Brainard	84	Chevy	MYR	SBO	TMP	STA	WAL	SEE	TMP	RIV	NHA	STA; DNQ	TMP	OSW; 17	RIV	NHA; 30	STA	TMP	52nd	52	
2020	Allie Brainard	56	Ford	JEN; 29																29th	118	
2020	Allie Brainard	56	Chevy		WMM; 23	WMM; 18	JEN; 22	MND; 27	TMP	NHA; 27	STA	TMP								29th	118	
