= Caleb Heady =

American racing driver (born 2004)

- Nationality: American
- Born: November 3, 2004 (age 22) Shelbyville, Kentucky, U.S.

SMART Modified Tour career
- Debut season: 2021
- Years active: 2021–2024
- Starts: 31
- Championships: 1
- Wins: 3
- Poles: 2
- Best finish: 1st in 2022
- Finished last season: 56th (2024)
- Statistics up to date as of April 24, 2025.

Caleb Heady (born November 3, 2004) is an American professional stock car racing driver who has previously competed in the SMART Modified Tour, where he won the championship in 2022 while driving for Tommy Baldwin Racing.

Heady has also competed in the SEST Limited Late Models, the Race of Champions Asphalt Modified Tour, the World Series of Asphalt Stock Car Racing, the INEX Summer Shootout Series, and the INEX Winter Heat Series.

== Motorsports results ==
=== SMART Modified Tour ===
SMART Modified Tour results
| Year | Car owner | No. | Make | 1 | 2 | 3 | 4 | 5 | 6 | 7 | 8 | 9 | 10 | 11 | 12 | 13 | 14 | SMTC | Pts | Ref |
|---|---|---|---|---|---|---|---|---|---|---|---|---|---|---|---|---|---|---|---|---|
| 2021 | Tommy Baldwin Racing | 7NY | PSR | CRW; 5 | FLO; 1* | SBO | FCS | CRW; 2 | DIL | CAR | | | PUL; 2 | HCY | ACE; 4 | | | 14th | 146 | |
| 2021 | Tommy Baldwin Racing | 7 | PSR | | | | | | | | CRW; 4 | DOM | | | | | | 14th | 146 | |
| 2022 | Tommy Baldwin Racing | 7NY | PSR | FLO; 2 | SNM; 7 | CRW; 1* | | FCS; 16 | CRW; 2 | | | CAR; 4 | DOM; 2 | HCY; 6 | TRI; 3 | | | 1st | 334 | |
| 2022 | Tommy Baldwin Racing | 7 | PSR | | | | SBO; 3 | | | | | | | | | PUL; 16 | | 1st | 334 | |
| 2022 | Tommy Baldwin Racing | 7NYH | PSR | | | | | | | NWS; 11 | NWS; 12 | | | | | | | 1st | 334 | |
| 2023 | Tommy Baldwin Racing | 7NY | PSR | FLO; 2* | CRW; 15 | SBO; 12 | HCY; 1* | FCS; 6 | CRW; 23 | ACE; 16 | CAR; 3 | PUL; 16 | TRI; 11 | SBO; 21 | ROU | | | 9th | 340 | |
| 2024 | Jamie Tomaino | 99 | N/A | FLO | CRW | SBO; 20 | TRI | ROU | HCY | FCS | CRW | JAC | CAR | CRW | DOM | SBO | NWS | 56th | 21 | |
