= Dean Ward (racing driver) =

American racing driver (born 1966)

- Nationality: American
- Born: February 21, 1966 (age 60) Winston-Salem, North Carolina, U.S.

NASCAR Whelen Southern Modified Tour career
- Debut season: 2007
- Years active: 2007–2009, 2011
- Starts: 13
- Championships: 0
- Wins: 0
- Poles: 0
- Best finish: 24th in 2009
- Statistics up to date as of September 25, 2026.

Dean Ward (born February 21, 1966) is an American professional stock car racing driver who competed in the now defunct NASCAR Whelen Southern Modified Tour from 2007 to 2011. He is the father of fellow racing driver Trevor Ward.

Ward has previously competed in series such as the SMART Modified Tour, the CARS Tour in both the Late Model Stock Tour and the now defunct Super Late Model Tour, the IHRA Stock Car Series, and the NASCAR Local Racing Series.

== Motorsports results ==
=== NASCAR ===
(key) (Bold – Pole position awarded by qualifying time. Italics – Pole position earned by points standings or practice time. * – Most laps led.)

==== Whelen Southern Modified Tour ====
NASCAR Whelen Southern Modified Tour results
Year	Car owner	No.	Make	1	2	3	4	5	6	7	8	9	10	11	12	13	14	NWSMTC	Pts	Ref
2007	Chip Harpe	71	Chevy	CRW	FAI	GRE	CRW	CRW; 21	BGS	MAR	ACE	CRW; 15	SNM	CRW; 18	CRW; 7			25th	473	
2008	Chip Harpe	71	Chevy	CRW	ACE	CRW	BGS; 24	CRW; 17	LAN	CRW; 19	SNM	MAR	CRW	CRW; 21				25th	409	
2009	John Holloway	71	Chevy	CON	SBO; 14	CRW; 22	LAN	CRW	BGS; 6	BRI	CRW	MBS	CRW	CRW	MAR	ACE	CRW	24th	368	
2011	Glenn Ryerson	71	Chevy	CRW	HCY	SBO	CRW	CRW	BGS; 16	BRI	CRW	LGY	THO	TRI; 15	CRW	CLT	CRW	29th	233	

=== CARS Late Model Stock Car Tour ===
(key) (Bold – Pole position awarded by qualifying time. Italics – Pole position earned by points standings or practice time. * – Most laps led. ** – All laps led.)

CARS Late Model Stock Car Tour results
Year	Team	No.	Make	1	2	3	4	5	6	7	8	9	10	11	12	13	14	15	16	17	CLMSCTC	Pts	Ref
2024	MK Racing	12W	N/A	SNM	HCY	AAS	OCS	ACE	TCM	LGY	DOM	CRW	HCY	NWS	ACE; 20	WCS	FLC	SBO	TCM	NWS	N/A	0	

=== CARS Super Late Model Tour ===
(key)

CARS Super Late Model Tour results
Year	Team	No.	Make	1	2	3	4	5	6	7	8	9	CSLMTC	Pts	Ref
2018	Dean Ward	12	Chevy	MYB	NSH	ROU; 23	HCY	BRI	AND	HCY	ROU; 15	SBO; 15	25th	46	

=== SMART Modified Tour ===
SMART Modified Tour results
Year	Car owner	No.	Make	1	2	3	4	5	6	7	8	9	10	11	12	13	SMTC	Pts	Ref
2021	Dean Ward Performance	12	N/A	CRW	FLO	SBO	FCS	CRW	DIL	CAR	CRW	DOM	PUL	HCY	ACE; 20		N/A	0	
2022	Dean Ward Performance	12	N/A	FLO; 11	SNM; 24	CRW	SBO; 22	FCS	CRW	NWS	NWS	CAR	DOM	HCY	TRI	PUL	31st	39	

=== IHRA Late Model Sportsman Series ===
(key) (Bold – Pole position awarded by qualifying time. Italics – Pole position earned by points standings or practice time. * – Most laps led. ** – All laps led.)

IHRA Late Model Sportsman Series
Year	Team	No.	Make	1	2	3	ISCSS	Pts	Ref
2026	Dean Ward Performance	12	Chevy	DUB; 34	CDL	AND	N/A	0	
