= Brody Jones =

American racing driver

- Jones' No. 92 car at Bowman Gray Stadium in 2014
- Nationality: American
- Born: Winston-Salem, North Carolina, U.S.

SMART Modified Tour career
- Debut season: 2021
- Years active: 2021, 2025–present
- Starts: 6
- Championships: 0
- Wins: 0
- Poles: 0
- Best finish: 25th in 2021
- Statistics up to date as of October 17, 2026.

Brody Jones (birth date unknown) is an American professional stock car racing driver who currently competes in the SMART Modified Tour, driving the No. 92 for his own team.

Jones has also competed in the ASA Southern Modified Race Tour and the NASCAR Local Racing Series, where he competed in the modified division at Bowman Gray Stadium.

== Motorsports results ==
=== SMART Modified Tour ===
SMART Modified Tour results
Year	Car owner	No.	Make	1	2	3	4	5	6	7	8	9	10	11	12	13	14	SMTC	Pts	Ref
2021	N/A	92	N/A	CRW; 15	FLO; 15	SBO; DNS	FCS	CRW	DIL	CAR	CRW	DOM	PUL	HCY	ACE			25th	40	
2025	Brody Jones	92	N/A	FLO	AND	SBO	ROU	HCY	FCS	CRW	CPS	CAR	CRW	DOM	FCS	TRI; 28	NWS; 13	38th	41	
2026	Brody Jones	92	N/A	FLO	AND	SBO	DOM	HCY	WKS	FCR	CRW	PUL	CAR	ROU	TRI	NWS; 20		58th	21	
