= Gary Young Jr. =

American racing driver

- Nationality: American
- Born: Burlington, North Carolina, U.S.

SMART Modified Tour career
- Debut season: 2021
- Current team: Gary & Melissa Young
- Years active: 2021–present
- Car number: 45
- Starts: 24
- Championships: 0
- Wins: 0
- Poles: 0
- Best finish: 19th in 2023
- Finished last season: 55th (2025)
- Statistics up to date as of October 24, 2025.

Gary Young Jr. (birth date unknown) is an American professional stock car racing driver and team owner who currently competes in the SMART Modified Tour, driving the No. 45 for his own team.

Young has also competed in series such as the Southeast Limited Late Model Series, the 602 Modified Tour, the Southern Modified Race Tour, and the ASA Southern Modified Race Tour.

== Motorsports results ==
=== SMART Modified Tour ===
SMART Modified Tour results
Year	Car owner	No.	Make	1	2	3	4	5	6	7	8	9	10	11	12	13	14	SMTC	Pts	Ref
2021	Gary & Melissa Young	45	N/A	CRW	FLO	SBO	FCS	CRW	DIL	CAR	CRW	DOM	PUL	HCY	ACE; 18			N/A	0	
2022	Gary & Melissa Young	45	N/A	FLO; 22	SNM; 13	CRW	SBO; 19	FCS	CRW	NWS; DNS	NWS	CAR	DOM	HCY; 20	TRI	PUL; 13		23rd	68	
2023	Gary & Melissa Young	45	N/A	FLO; 10	CRW; 18	SBO; 23	HCY	FCS	CRW	ACE; 21	CAR; 15	PUL; 14	TRI; 24	SBO; 19	ROU			19th	184	
2024	Gary & Melissa Young	45	N/A	FLO; 19	CRW; 26	SBO; 26	TRI	ROU; 17	HCY	FCS; 21	CRW	JAC; 14	CAR; 15	CRW	DOM	SBO; 25	NWS; 15	20th	194	
2025	Gary & Melissa Young	45	N/A	FLO	AND	SBO; 23	ROU	HCY	FCS	CRW	CPS	CAR	CRW	DOM	FCS	TRI	NWS	55th	18	
