= Trevor Catalano =

American racing driver (born 2006)

- Born: August 1, 2006 (age 20) Ontario, New York, U.S.

NASCAR Whelen Modified Tour career
- Debut season: 2024
- Current team: Catalano Motorsports
- Years active: 2024–present
- Car number: 56
- Crew chief: David Catalano
- Starts: 45
- Championships: 0
- Wins: 1
- Poles: 0
- Best finish: 8th in 2024, 2025
- Finished last season: 13th (2026)
- Statistics up to date as of October 12, 2026.

Trevor Catalano (born August 1, 2006) is an American professional stock car racing driver who competes part-time in the NASCAR Whelen Modified Tour, driving the No. 56 for Catalano Motorsports. He is the younger brother of Tyler Catalano and Tommy Catalano, who also compete in the Modified Tour.

Catalano has previously competed in series such as the SMART Modified Tour, the DIRTcar Sportsman Series, the Race of Champions Super Stocks, and the Indoor Auto Racing Championship.

In December 2023, it was revealed that Catalano would compete full-time in the NASCAR Whelen Modified Tour in 2024, driving alongside brothers Tyler and Tommy, thus becoming the second time where at least two members of the Catalano family have raced full-time in the series since 2019, where Tommy and Timmy competed full-time. On July 20, 2024, Catalano won his first career race at Monadnock Speedway after holding off defending series champion Ron Silk.

== Motorsports results ==
=== NASCAR ===
(key) (Bold – Pole position awarded by qualifying time. Italics – Pole position earned by points standings or practice time. * – Most laps led.)

==== Whelen Modified Tour ====
NASCAR Whelen Modified Tour results
Year	Car owner	No.	Make	1	2	3	4	5	6	7	8	9	10	11	12	13	14	15	16	NWMTC	Pts	Ref
2024	Amy Catalano	56	Chevy	NSM; 5	RCH; 3	THO; 19	MON; 17	RIV; 24	SEE; 12	NHA; 12	MON; 1	LMP; 13	THO; 9	OSW; 14	RIV; 13	MON; 12	THO; 18	NWS	MAR; 18	8th	475	
2025	Amy Catalano	56	Chevy	NSM; 13	THO; 3	NWS; 15	SEE; 5	RIV; 12	WMM; 8	LMP; 13	MON; 13	MON; 5	THO; 14	RCH; 4	OSW; 9	NHA; 21	RIV; 8	THO; 13	MAR; 15	8th	536	
2026	Amy Catalano	56	Chevy	NSM; 9	MAR; 11	THO; 29	SEE; 14	RIV; 13	OXF; 6	SEE; 16	CLM; 13	WMM; 18	MON; 15	THO; 17	NHA; 5	STA; 24	OSW; 12	RIV	THO	13th	414	

=== SMART Modified Tour ===
SMART Modified Tour results
Year	Car owner	No.	Make	1	2	3	4	5	6	7	8	9	10	11	12	13	SMTC	Pts	Ref
2023	N/A	54N	N/A	FLO	CRW	SBO	HCY	FCS	CRW	ACE	CAR	PUL	TRI	SBO	ROU; 17		48th	24	
2026	N/A	56	N/A	FLO	AND	SBO; 24	DOM	HCY	WKS	FCR	CRW	PUL	CAR	ROU	TRI	NWS	72nd	17	
