= Daniel Yates =

American racing driver

- Nationality: American
- Born: Lexington, North Carolina, U.S.

SMART Modified Tour career
- Debut season: 2021
- Current team: Todd Yates
- Years active: 2021–present
- Car number: 18
- Starts: 59
- Championships: 0
- Wins: 0
- Poles: 0
- Best finish: 11th in 2025
- Statistics up to date as of October 17, 2026.

Daniel Yates (birth date unknown) is an American professional stock car racing driver who currently competes in the SMART Modified Tour, driving the No. 18 for Todd Yates.

Yates has also competed in the Southern Modified Racing Series, the Southern Modified Race Tour, and the NASCAR Weekly Series.

== Motorsports results ==
=== SMART Modified Tour ===
SMART Modified Tour results
Year	Car owner	No.	Make	1	2	3	4	5	6	7	8	9	10	11	12	13	14	SMTC	Pts	Ref
2021	Todd Yates	18	LFR	CRW; 21	FLO; 14	SBO; 11	FCS; 9	CRW; 12	DIL; 15	CAR	CRW; 11	DOM		HCY; 12	ACE; 21			13th	149	
2021	Todd Yates	18N	LFR										PUL; 25					13th	149	
2022	Todd Yates	18	LFR	FLO	SNM	CRW	SBO	FCS	CRW	NWS	NWS	CAR; 9	DOM	HCY; 8	TRI	PUL; 9		24th	67	
2023	Todd Yates	18	LFR	FLO	CRW; 9		HCY; 17	FCS; 18	CRW; 14	ACE; 25	CAR; 12	PUL; 12		SBO; 17				12th	278	
2023	Todd Yates	18D	LFR			SBO; 13												12th	278	
2023	Todd Yates	18X	LFR										TRI; 16					12th	278	
2023	Todd Yates	18Y	LFR												ROU; 20			12th	278	
2024	Todd Yates	18	LFR	FLO	CRW; 20	SBO; 21	TRI	ROU; 8	HCY; 11	FCS; 11	CRW; 17	JAC; 15	CAR; 23	CRW; 17	DOM	SBO; 10	NWS; 14	14th	285	
2025	Todd Yates	18	LFR	FLO; 8	AND; 11	SBO; 14	ROU; 15	HCY; 17	FCS; 14	CRW; 16	CPS; 16	CAR; 13	CRW; 10	DOM; 12	FCS	TRI; 12	NWS; 10	11th	365	
2026	Todd Yates	18	LFR	FLO; 17	AND; 17	SBO; Wth	DOM; 12	HCY; 19	WKS; 17	FCR	CRW; 16	PUL; Wth	CAR; Wth	ROU; 17	TRI; Wth	NWS; 29		18th	184	
