= 2022 SMART Modified Tour =

The 2022 SMART Modified Tour was the 18th season of the SMART Modified Tour. It began with the Low Country 99 at Florence Motor Speedway on March 5. It ended with The Radford Race at Ace Speedway on October 22. Caleb Heady won his first championship in the series, 14 points ahead of series runner up Brandon Ward.

== Schedule ==
No.	Race title	Track	Date
1	Low Country 99	Florence Motor Speedway, Timmonsville, South Carolina	March 5
2	Lucky Charms 99	Southern National Motorsports Park, Kenly, North Carolina	March 19
3	Warrior 99	Caraway Speedway, Asheboro, North Carolina	March 26
4	Flying VA 99 Ray Hendrick Tribute Race	South Boston Speedway, South Boston, Virginia	April 2
5	Kenny Minter Classic 110	Franklin County Speedway, Callaway, Virginia	April 10
6	Revolutionary 99	Caraway Speedway, Asheboro, North Carolina	June 29
7	The Uncatchable 50	North Wilkesboro Speedway, North Wilkesboro, North Carolina	August 2
8	The Reverend 50	North Wilkesboro Speedway, North Wilkesboro, North Carolina	August 3
9	Carteret Clash	Carteret Motor Speedway, Swansboro, North Carolina	September 3
10	Old Dominion Classic 99 presented by The Stanley Law Group	Dominion Raceway, Thornburg, Virginia	September 17
11	Hickory Hundred	Hickory Motor Speedway, Hickory, North Carolina	October 8
12	Cardinal 99	Tri-County Motor Speedway, Hudson, North Carolina	October 15
13	The Radford Race	Pulaski County Motorsports Park, Radford, Virginia	October 22

== Results and standings ==
=== Races ===
No.	Race	Pole position	Most laps led	Winning driver
1	Low Country 99	Bobby Measmer Jr.	Matt Hirschman	Matt Hirschman
2	Lucky Charms 99	Jonathan Brown	Joey Coulter	Matt Hirschman
3	Warrior 99	Jonathan Brown	Caleb Heady	Caleb Heady
4	Flying VA 99 Ray Hendrick Tribute Race	Matt Hirschman	Matt Hirschman	Matt Hirschman
5	Kenny Minter Classic 110	Brandon Ward	Jonathan Brown	Jonathan Brown
6	Revolutionary 99	Brian Loftin	Brandon Ward	Joey Coulter
7	The Uncatchable 50	Matt Hirschman	Spencer Davis	Ryan Newman
8	The Reverend 50	Matt Hirschman	Matt Hirschman	Matt Hirschman
9	Carteret Clash	Burt Myers	Bobby Labonte	Brian Loftin
10	Old Dominion Classic 99 presented by The Stanley Law Group	Matt Hirschman	Matt Hirschman	Matt Hirschman
11	Hickory Hundred	Matt Hirschman	Matt Hirschman	Matt Hirschman
12	Cardinal 99	Brian Loftin	Brandon Ward	Brian Loftin
13	The Radford Race	Brandon Ward	Brandon Ward	Brandon Ward

=== Drivers' championship ===
(key) Bold - Pole position awarded by time. Italics - Pole position set by final practice results or rainout. * – Most laps led.

Pos	Driver	FLO	SNM	CRW	SBO	FCS	CRW	NWS	NWS	CAR	DOM	HCY	TRI	PUL	Points
1	Caleb Heady	2	7	1*	3	16	2	11	12	4	2	6	3	16	334
2	Brandon Ward	3	4	8	8	**7**	14*	8	13	15	3	3	2*	**1***	320
3	Bobby Labonte	6	5	3	4	5	13	17	3	11*	4	4	4	4	309
4	Brian Loftin	7	6	5	9	9	**17**	9	2	1	15	19	**1**	3	275
5	Burt Myers	4	3	2	6	4	20	5	5	**2**	5	2	DSQ	5	267
6	Jonathan Brown	5	**11**	**10**	2	1*	25		10	5	16	7	16	2	266
7	Matt Hirschman	1*	1	4	**1***			**3**	**1***		**1***	**1***			256
8	Jason Myers	9	8	11	13	8	24	13	29	7	7	10	6	8	230
9	Dennis Holdren	12	20	9	14	6	3			13	11	25	10	15	208
10	Bobby Measmer Jr.	**10**	9	6	12	3	27	20	16	6	8	18			181
11	Jimmy Wallace	8	10	19	18		DNS			16	10	27	11	6	157
12	Gary Putnam			7		10	9			3	17	9	7		157
13	Jeremy Gerstner	15	18	25	16	2	5	27	20	8	12				155
14	Joey Coulter		12*				1	14	26		6	5	5		147
15	Brian Weber	20	23	20	20	15	22	33	24	12		16	15	14	133
16	Greg Butcher	23	15	18	26	13				10	13	23	14		123
17	Troy Young	18	25	17	11	18	7	16		14	22				116
18	Jonathan Kievman	14	17	22		19	12						9		93
19	Kevin Orlando	17	26	24		17	4					15			83
20	Wes Gilbert		19		24		16	28	23	18	14	13			82
21	Tommy Neal	19		16	15	12	18								75
22	Craig Young	21	27	23		21		23		17	21			DNS	70
23	Gary Young Jr.	22	13		19			DNS				20		13	68
24	Daniel Yates									9		8		9	67
25	Jamie Tomaino	16	16	14	25		21	19	19						63
26	Chris Finocchario		14		29			32	17		18	28		7	59
27	Carson Loftin										9	14	12		58
28	Bussy Beavers			15		14	6								58
29	Tom Buzze		22		5			6	27		20				47
30	John Smith											11	8		43
31	Dean Ward	11	24		22										39
32	Spencer Martin											12	13		37
33	Danny Bohn				7						19				36
34	Anthony Bello			12			15	12	11						35
35	Michael Ritch						26					24		11	32
36	Max McLaughlin		2					29	8						30
37	Dan Speeney			26	17	20									30
38	Jason Poole			13			19								30
39	Cody Kohler	13			21			22	21						28
40	Paulie Hartwig III						8								23
41	Zach Brewer											22	17		22
42	J. B. Fortin				10										22
43	Randy Butner													10	21
44	Josh Williams						10								21
45	Bryan Dauzat						11								20
46	Paul Hall					11									20
47	Chris Fleming													12	19
48	Luke Fleming			21	27										15
49	Jonathan Cash											17			14
50	Austin Kochenash											21			11
51	Mason Diaz		21												10
52	Spencer Davis						23	2*	6						9
53	Kyle Ebersole				23										9
54	Andrew Harrah											26			5
55	Cory Lovette						28								3
56	Jeff Fultz				28										3
57	Dawn Gerstner				30										1
	Jimmy Blewett							7	9						
	Tim Connolly							24	14						
	Chase Cook							18	25						
	Andy Jankowiak							15	28						
	Devin O'Connell							30	18						
	Ryan Preece							4	4						
	Danny Propst							25	22						
	Kevin Timmerman							21	15						
	Max Zachem							10	7						
	Doug Patton							26							
	Ryan Newman							1							
	Brian Sones							31							
Pos	Driver	FLO	SNM	CRW	SBO	FCS	CRW	NWS	NWS	CAR	DOM	HCY	TRI	PUL	Points

== See also ==
- 2022 NASCAR Cup Series
- 2022 NASCAR Xfinity Series
- 2022 NASCAR Camping World Truck Series
- 2022 ARCA Menards Series
- 2022 ARCA Menards Series East
- 2022 ARCA Menards Series West
- 2022 NASCAR Whelen Modified Tour
- 2022 NASCAR Pinty's Series
- 2022 NASCAR Mexico Series
- 2022 NASCAR Whelen Euro Series
- 2022 CARS Tour
- 2022 SRX Series
