= Chris Fleming (racing driver) =

American racing driver

- Nationality: American
- Born: July 12, 1963 (age 63) Mount Airy, North Carolina, U.S.

NASCAR Whelen Southern Modified Tour career
- Debut season: 2007
- Years active: 2007, 2014
- Starts: 3
- Championships: 0
- Wins: 0
- Poles: 0
- Best finish: 26th in 2014
- Statistics up to date as of September 25, 2026.

Christopher Fleming (born July 12, 1963) is an American professional stock car racing driver who competed in the now defunct NASCAR Whelen Southern Modified Tour from 2007 to 2014. He is the brother and uncle of Frank Fleming and Luke Fleming respectively.

Fleming has previously competed in series such as the SMART Modified Tour, the ASA CRA Super Series, the CRA JEGS All-Stars Tour, and the NASCAR Local Racing Series, and a regular competitor at Bowman Gray Stadium, where has won multiple times in the modified division.

== Motorsports results ==
=== NASCAR ===
(key) (Bold – Pole position awarded by qualifying time. Italics – Pole position earned by points standings or practice time. * – Most laps led.)

==== Whelen Southern Modified Tour ====
NASCAR Whelen Southern Modified Tour results
Year	Car owner	No.	Make	1	2	3	4	5	6	7	8	9	10	11	12	13	14	NWSMTC	Pts	Ref
2007	Luke Fleming	13	Chevy	CRW	FAI	GRE	CRW; 10	CRW	BGS	MAR	ACE	CRW	SNM	CRW	CRW; 15			35th	252	
2014	Amy Fleming	13	Chevy	CRW	SNM	SBO	LGY	CRW	BGS	BRI	LGY	CRW	SBO	SNM	CRW	CRW	CLT; 11	26th	33	

=== SMART Modified Tour ===
SMART Modified Tour results
Year	Car owner	No.	Make	1	2	3	4	5	6	7	8	9	10	11	12	13	SMTC	Pts	Ref
1993	N/A	27	Buick	CRW; 9	SUM; 10	TRI; 11	CRW; 13	MYB; 12	SNM; 4	CRW; 16	TRI; 20	SBO; 4	CRW				17th	1045	
1994	N/A	28	Buick	CRW; 5	NWS; 8	SUM; 18	TRI; 15	CRW; N/A^{†}	MYB; 26	CRW; 8	ACE; N/A^{†}	SNM	CRW; 2				N/A	0	
1995	N/A	13	N/A	SUM	CRW	TRI	CRW	MYB	CRW	NWS; 15							30th	301	
1995	N/A	16	N/A								PSS; 9	FCR	HCY; 9	CRW			30th	301	
1996	N/A	15	Chevy	SUM	CRW	NWS; 18	FCR	FCR	TRI	CRW	MYB	CRW	NWS	FCR	CRW		N/A	0	
2000	N/A	13	N/A	CRW	JAC	AND; 6	CRW	MYB; 21	CRW	ACE; DNQ	CRW	PUL; 13	CRW; 22	CRW; 23			24th	556	
2001	N/A	13	N/A	CRW	CRW	AND	LAN	CRW	MYB; 17	ACE	CRW	PUL	CRW	CRW	CRW	SBS	52nd	112	
2002	N/A	13	N/A	SUM; 10	CRW; 17	LAN; 13	CRW; 8	ACE; 8	CRW; 22	PUL; 3	CRW; 24	CON; 10	CRW; 23				13th	1320	
2003	N/A	11	N/A	CRW; 8	SUM		UMP; 4	UMP; DNQ	CRW	MYB							20th	699	
2003	N/A	13	N/A			CRW; 23									UMP; 18		20th	699	
2003	N/A	3	N/A								ACE; 23	CRW	UMP; 21	CON			20th	699	
2004	N/A	u2	N/A	CRW	UMP; 9	CRW	CRW	UMP	UMP								32nd	350	
2004	N/A	2	N/A							CRW; 14	MYB	CRW	CRW; 24	PUL	CON	UMP	32nd	350	
2021	N/A	13	N/A	CRW	FLO	SBO	FCS; 5	CRW	DIL	CAR	CRW	DOM	PUL; 21	HCY	ACE; 16		28th	36	
2022	N/A	13	N/A	FLO	SNM	CRW	SBO	FCS	CRW	NWS	NWS	CAR	DOM	HCY	TRI	PUL; 12	47th	19	
^{†} - Results/participation unknown
