= Brandon Ward (racing driver) =

American racing driver (born 1980)

- Nationality: American
- Born: October 11, 1980 (age 46) Winston-Salem, North Carolina, U.S.

NASCAR Whelen Southern Modified Tour career
- Debut season: 2006
- Years active: 2006–2009, 2011–2014
- Starts: 23
- Championships: 0
- Wins: 1
- Poles: 0
- Best finish: 18th in 2011
- Statistics up to date as of August 20, 2024.

Brandon Ward (born October 11, 1980) is an American professional stock car racing driver who currently competes full-time in the SMART Modified Tour, driving the No. 04 for Kevin Powell Motorsports.

Ward has previously competed in series such as the now defunct NASCAR Whelen Southern Modified Tour, the NASCAR Whelen Modified Tour, what is now known as the ARCA Menards Series East, the NASCAR Goody's Dash Series, the X-1R Pro Cup Series, the PASS South Super Late Model Series, the PASS National Championship Super Late Model Series, and the World Series of Asphalt Stock Car Racing.

== Motorsports results ==
=== NASCAR ===
(key) (Bold – Pole position awarded by qualifying time. Italics – Pole position earned by points standings or practice time. * – Most laps led.)

==== K&N Pro Series East ====
NASCAR K&N Pro Series East results
Year	Team	No.	Make	1	2	3	4	5	6	7	8	9	10	NKNPSEC	Pts	Ref
2010	Mike Laughlin	7	Chevy	GRE	SBO	IOW	MAR	NHA	LRP	LEE	JFC	NHA; 31	DOV; 7	38th	221	

==== Goody's Dash Series ====
NASCAR Goody's Dash Series results
Year	Team	No.	Make	1	2	3	4	5	6	7	8	9	10	11	12	13	14	15	16	17	18	19	20	NGDS	Pts	Ref
1998	N/A	62	Pontiac	DAY	HCY	CAR; DNQ	CLT	TRI; 26	LAN	BRI	SUM	GRE	ROU; 15	SNM	MYB	CON; 25	HCY; 8	LAN	STA	LOU	VOL	USA		32nd	659	
1998	N/A	11	Pontiac																				HOM; 6	32nd	659	
2000	N/A	56	Pontiac	DAY; 23	MON	STA	JAC	CAR																32nd	543	
2000	N/A	11	Mercury						CLT; 5	SBO; 24	ROU	LOU	SUM	GRE	SNM	MYB; 28	BRI; 13	HCY	JAC	USA	LAN			32nd	543	
2001	N/A	11	Mercury	DAY; 42	ROU	DAR										MYB; 13	BRI; 1	ACE	JAC	USA	NSH			33rd	638	
2001	N/A	11	Pontiac				CLT; 4	LOU	JAC	KEN	SBO	DAY; 40	GRE	SNM	NRV; 23									33rd	638	
2002	N/A	11	Mercury	DAY; 7																				10th	1755	
2002	N/A	11	Toyota		HAR; 23	ROU; 16	LON; 24	CLT; 23	KEN; 8	MEM; 6	GRE; 23	SNM; 18	SBO; 8	MYB; 25	BRI; 3	MOT; 4	ATL; 3							10th	1755	
2003	N/A	11	Toyota	DAY; 5	OGL; 7	CLT; 26	SBO; 3	GRE; 3	KEN; 27	BRI; 21	ATL; 6													5th	1048	

==== Whelen Modified Tour ====
NASCAR Whelen Modified Tour results
Year	Car owner	No.	Make	1	2	3	4	5	6	7	8	9	10	11	12	13	14	15	16	17	18	NWMTC	Pts	Ref
2023	Jeff Day	04	Chevy	NSM	RCH	MON	RIV	LEE	SEE	RIV	WAL	NHA	LMP	THO	LGY	OSW	MON	RIV	NWS; 24	THO	MAR; 15	53rd	49	

==== Whelen Southern Modified Tour ====
NASCAR Whelen Southern Modified Tour results
Year	Car owner	No.	Make	1	2	3	4	5	6	7	8	9	10	11	12	13	14	NWSMTC	Pts	Ref
2006	Mark Woodruff	42	Chevy	CRW	GRE	CRW	DUB	CRW	BGS	MAR	CRW	ACE	CRW	HCY; 6	DUB; 3	SNM		32nd	315	
2007	David Pinnix	42	Chevy	CRW; 24	FAI; 9	GRE; 8	CRW	CRW	BGS	MAR	ACE	CRW	SNM	CRW	CRW			27th	402	
2008	Johnny Hemric	93	Chevy	CRW	ACE	CRW	BGS	CRW; 3	LAN	CRW; 10	SNM	MAR	CRW; 5	CRW; 14				22nd	575	
2009	Johnny Hemric	93	Chevy	CON; 6	SBO	CRW; 23	LAN	CRW; 16	BGS	BRI	CRW	MBS	CRW	CRW	MAR	ACE	CRW	25th	359	
2011	Bryan Fishel	44	Chevy	CRW	HCY	SBO	CRW	CRW	BGS	BRI	CRW; 13	LGY	THO	TRI; 4	CRW; 5	CLT	CRW; 9	18th	577	
2012	Bryan Fishel	44	Chevy	CRW; 4	CRW	SBO; 1	CRW	CRW; 2	BGS; 25	BRI	LGY	THO	CRW	CLT				21st	148	
2013	Bryan Fishel	44	Chevy	CRW	SNM; 9	SBO	CRW; 16	CRW; 15	BGS	BRI	LGY	CRW; 9	CRW	SNM	CLT			19th	127	
2014	Bryan Fishel	44	Chevy	CRW	SNM	SBO	LGY	CRW	BGS	BRI	LGY	CRW	SBO	SNM	CRW; 19	CRW	CLT	31st	25	

=== CARS Late Model Stock Car Tour ===
(key) (Bold – Pole position awarded by qualifying time. Italics – Pole position earned by points standings or practice time. * – Most laps led. ** – All laps led.)

CARS Late Model Stock Car Tour results
Year	Team	No.	Make	1	2	3	4	5	6	7	8	9	10	11	12	13	14	15	CLMSCTC	Pts	Ref
2025	KP Speed Motorsports	12	N/A	AAS	WCS	CDL	OCS	ACE	NWS	LGY	DOM	CRW; 10	HCY	AND	FLC	SBO	TCM	NWS	60th	32	

=== SMART Modified Tour ===
SMART Modified Tour results
Year	Car owner	No.	Make	1	2	3	4	5	6	7	8	9	10	11	12	13	14	SMTC	Pts	Ref
2021	N/A	2	N/A	CRW	FLO; 7	SBO; 19			DIL; 2	**CAR**; 3	CRW	DOM	PUL; 1	HCY; 1*	ACE; 2			10th	179	
2021	N/A	04	N/A				FCS; 16	CRW										10th	179	
2022	Randy Renfrow	2	LFR	FLO; 3	SNM; 4	CRW; 8	SBO; 8	FCS; 7	CRW; 14*	NWS; 8	NWS; 13	CAR; 15	DOM; 3	HCY; 3	TRI; 2*	**PUL**; 1*		2nd	320	
2023	Randy Renfrow	2	LFR	FLO; 4	CRW; 1	SBO; 6	HCY; 8	FCS; 3	CRW; 16	ACE; 4	CAR; 1	PUL; 4	TRI; 12	SBO; 18	ROU; 3			2nd	448	
2024	Kevin Powell	04	N/A	FLO; 9	CRW; 16	SBO; 7	TRI	ROU; 10	HCY	FCS; 7				CRW; 1	DOM	SBO; 8	NWS	16th	275	
2024	Kevin Powell	4	N/A									**CRW**; 3	JAC	CAR				16th	275	
2025	Kevin Powell	04	N/A	FLO; 19	AND	SBO; 4	ROU; 18	HCY	FCS	CRW; 26	CPS	CAR	CRW	DOM	FCS	TRI	NWS; 2*	20th	138	
2026	Kevin Powell	04	N/A	FLO; 1*	AND; 6	SBO; 31	**DOM**; 9	HCY; 2	**WKS**; 18	FCR; 2*	CRW; 20	PUL; 7	CAR; 4	ROU; 4	TRI; 12	NWS; 11		4th	616	
