= Jason Tutterow =

American racing driver

- Nationality: American
- Born: Advance, North Carolina, U.S.

SMART Modified Tour career
- Debut season: 2023
- Current team: Jason Tutterow
- Years active: 2023–present
- Car number: 22
- Starts: 24
- Championships: 0
- Wins: 0
- Poles: 0
- Best finish: 17th in 2024
- Finished last season: 24th (2026)
- Statistics up to date as of October 20, 2026.

Jason Tutterow (birth date unknown) is an American professional stock car racing driver and team owner who currently competes in the SMART Modified Tour, driving the No. 22 for his own team.

Tutterow has also competed in series such as the Southeast Limited Late Model Series, the Southern Modified Racing Series, the Southern Modified Race Tour, and the NASCAR Weekly Series.

== Motorsports results ==
=== SMART Modified Tour ===
SMART Modified Tour results
Year	Car owner	No.	Make	1	2	3	4	5	6	7	8	9	10	11	12	13	14	SMTC	Pts	Ref
2023	Jason Tutterow	22	Fury	FLO; 20	CRW; 21	SBO; 26	HCY; 22	FCS	CRW; 25	ACE	CAR; 22	PUL	TRI	SBO	ROU; 18			23rd	133	
2024	Jason Tutterow	22	Fury	FLO; 20	CRW; 23	SBO; 9	TRI	ROU	HCY; 20	FCS	CRW; 20	JAC; 17	CAR; 18	CRW	DOM	SBO; 19	NWS; 20	17th	222	
2025	Jason Tutterow	22	Fury	FLO; Wth	AND	SBO; 31	ROU	HCY	FCS	CRW; 18	CPS; Wth	CAR; Wth	CRW; 19	DOM	FCS	TRI	NWS; DNS	36th	55	
2026	Jason Tutterow	22	Fury	FLO; 23	AND; 16	SBO	DOM; 16	HCY	WKS; 20	FCR; 16	CRW	PUL	CAR; Wth	ROU	TRI	NWS		24th	114	
