= Stephen Kopcik =

American racing driver

- Born: March 24, 1998 (age 28) Newtown, Connecticut, U.S.

NASCAR Whelen Modified Tour career
- Debut season: 2021
- Current team: Wanick Motorsports
- Years active: 2021, 2024–present
- Car number: 21
- Crew chief: Nick Kopcik
- Starts: 37
- Championships: 0
- Wins: 2
- Poles: 0
- Best finish: 5th in 2026
- Finished last season: 5th (2026)
- Statistics up to date as of October 12, 2026.

Stephen Kopcik (born March 24, 1998) is an American professional stock car racing driver who competes part-time in the NASCAR Whelen Modified Tour, driving the No. 21 for Wanick Motorsports. Kopcik was the 2015 SK Light Modified champion at Stafford Motor Speedway, where he also has numerous SK Modified wins.

On February 29, 2024, Kopcik was indefinitely suspended by NASCAR due to Kopcik being arrested six days prior at a minor league hockey game in Danbury, Connecticut, in which he was charged with two counts of assault in the third degree with physical injury and one count of reach of peace in the second degree. He was later reinstated two months later on April 30, 2024.

In 2026, Kopcik got his first career win in the Whelen Modified Tour at Martinsville Speedway.

Kopcik has previously competed in series such as the SMART Modified Tour, the Tri-Track Open Modified Series, and the World Series of Asphalt Stock Car Racing.

== Motorsports results ==
=== NASCAR ===
(key) (Bold – Pole position awarded by qualifying time. Italics – Pole position earned by points standings or practice time. * – Most laps led.)

==== Whelen Modified Tour ====
NASCAR Whelen Modified Tour results
Year	Car owner	No.	Make	1	2	3	4	5	6	7	8	9	10	11	12	13	14	15	16	NWMTC	Pts	Ref
2021	Joseph Bertuccio	2	Chevy	MAR	STA	RIV	JEN	OSW	RIV	NHA	NRP	STA	BEE	OSW	RCH	RIV	STA; 14			55th	30	
2024	Tommy Wanick	21	Chevy	NSM	RCH	THO	MON	RIV	SEE; 4	NHA	MON; 13	LMP	THO; 23	OSW	RIV	MON; 11	THO	NWS	MAR	28th	125	
2025	Tommy Wanick	21	Chevy	NSM; 6	THO; 7	NWS; 6	SEE; 2	RIV; 15	WMM; 2	LMP; 16	MON; 8	MON; 19	THO; 11	RCH; 10	OSW; 7	NHA; 19	RIV; 7	THO; 10	MAR; 3	6th	557	
2026	Tommy Wanick	21	Chevy	NSM; 13	MAR; 1*	THO; 1	SEE; 2*	RIV; 9	OXF; 14	SEE; 4*	CLM; 19	WMM; 11	MON; 10	THO; 8	NHA; 17	STA; 7*	OSW; 10	RIV; 20	THO; 9	5th	566	

=== SMART Modified Tour ===
SMART Modified Tour results
Year	Car owner	No.	Make	1	2	3	4	5	6	7	8	9	10	11	12	13	14	SMTC	Pts	Ref
2023	Stephen Kopcik	1CT	N/A	FLO	CRW	SBO	HCY	FCS	CRW	ACE	CAR	PUL; 6	TRI	SBO	ROU			43rd	35	
2024	Stephen Kopcik	1NY	N/A	FLO	CRW	SBO; 27	TRI	ROU	HCY	FCS	CRW	JAC	CAR	CRW	DOM	SBO	NWS	62nd	14	
2025	Tommy Wanick Jr.	1NY	N/A	FLO	AND	SBO; 2	ROU	HCY	FCS	CRW	CPS	CAR	CRW	DOM	FCS	TRI	NWS	40th	39	
2026	Tommy Wanick Jr.	1CT	N/A	FLO	AND	SBO; 2	DOM	HCY	WKS	FCR	CRW	PUL	CAR	ROU	TRI	NWS		46th	39	
