= Cory DiMatteo =

American racing driver (born 1997)

- Nationality: American
- Born: November 13, 1997 (age 28) Farmington, Connecticut, U.S.

NASCAR Whelen Modified Tour career
- Debut season: 2023
- Current team: Justin Manafort
- Years active: 2023, 2026–present
- Car number: 6
- Crew chief: John Lowinski
- Starts: 4
- Championships: 0
- Wins: 0
- Poles: 0
- Best finish: 36th in 2026
- Finished last season: 36th (2026)
- Statistics up to date as of October 12, 2026.

Cory DiMatteo (born November 13, 1997) is an American professional stock car racing driver who currently competes part-time in the NASCAR Whelen Modified Tour, driving the No. 6 for Justin Manafort.

DiMatteo has also previously competed in series such as the Monaco Modified Tri-Track Series, the ACT Late Model Tour, the Indoor Auto Racing Championship, and the NASCAR Local Racing Series, and is a frequent competitor at Stafford Motor Speedway, where he is a multiple time winner in the SK Modified division.

== Motorsports results ==
=== NASCAR ===
(key) (Bold – Pole position awarded by qualifying time. Italics – Pole position earned by points standings or practice time. * – Most laps led.)

==== Whelen Modified Tour ====
NASCAR Whelen Modified Tour results
Year	Car owner	No.	Make	1	2	3	4	5	6	7	8	9	10	11	12	13	14	15	16	17	18	NWMTC	Pts	Ref
2023	Michele Davini	17	N/A	NSM	RCH; 21	MON	RIV	LEE	SEE	RIV	WAL	NHA	LMP	THO	LGY	OSW	MON	RIV	NWS	THO	MAR	77th	23	
2026	Justin Manafort	6	N/A	NSM	MAR	THO	SEE	RIV	OXF	SEE	CLM	WMM	MON	THO; 20	NHA; 21	STA; 20	OSW	RIV	THO			36th	71	
