= 2026 NASCAR Whelen Modified Tour =

41st season of the NASCAR Whelen Modified Tour

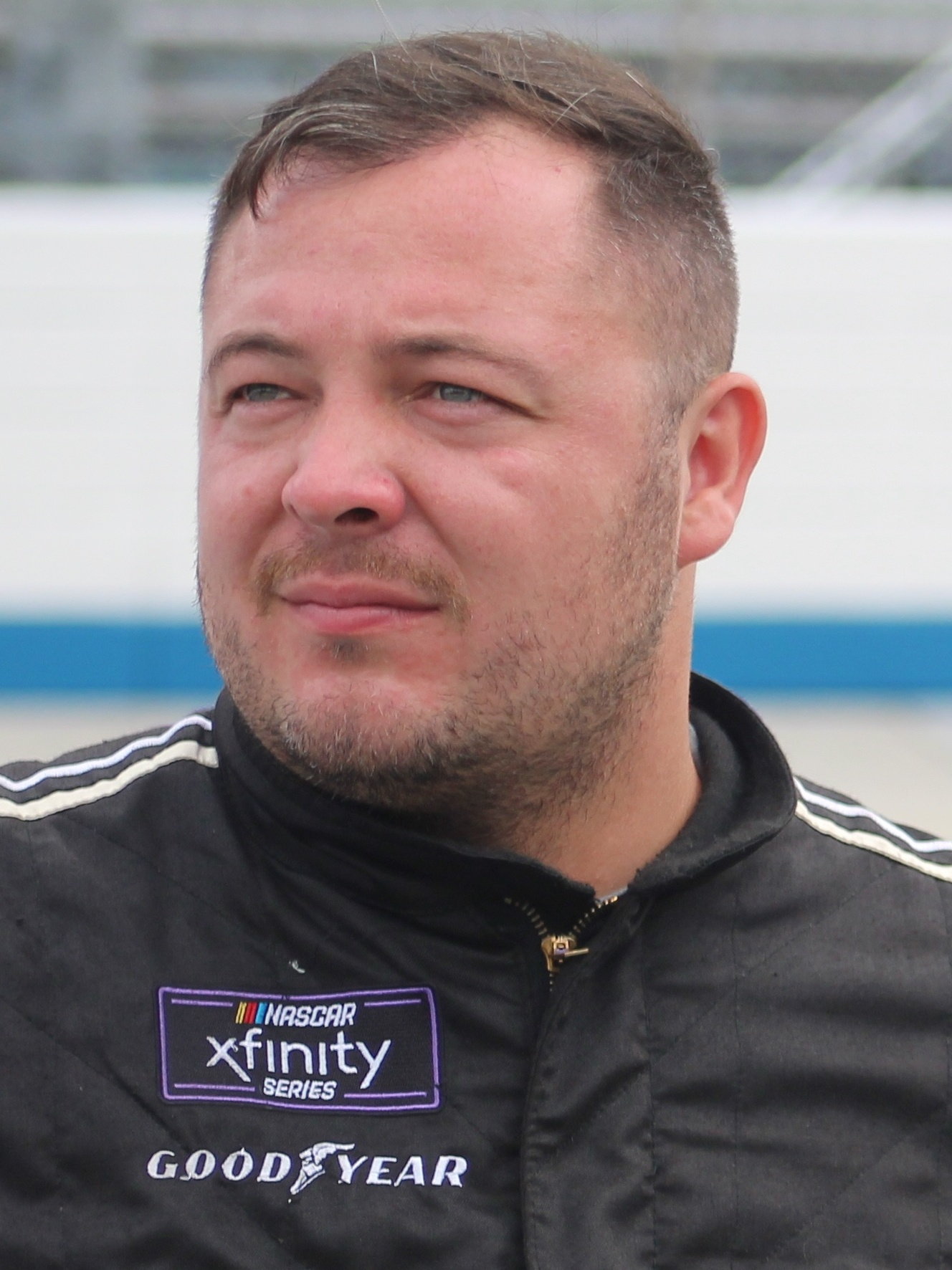
Patrick Emerling, the 2026 NASCAR Whelen Modified Tour champion.

The 2026 NASCAR Whelen Modified Tour was the 42nd season of the NASCAR Whelen Modified Tour, a stock car racing series sanctioned by NASCAR. It started with the New Smyrna Beach Area Visitors Bureau 200 at New Smyrna Speedway on February 7 and ended with the World Series 150 at Thompson Speedway Motorsports Park on October 11.

Austin Beers entered the season as the defending champion. Patrick Emerling won his first series title by taking the green flag in the season finale at Thompson.

On November 10, 2025, it was announced that former driver and crew chief Gary Putnam would take over as the series director, replacing Jimmy Wilson, who was promoted to Senior Technical Director of the NASCAR Regional department.

During the off season, NASCAR conducted multiple tire tests with American Racer tires in order to gauge the feasibility of switching away from Hoosier Racing Tire, who has been the sole supplier of tires for the series since 1999. The first test was held at Jennerstown Speedway, while the second test was conducted at New Smyrna Speedway. On December 24, 2025, it was announced that for the 2026 season, American Racer tires would be the official tire provider for the WMT. This marked the first time since 1998 where Hoosier would not be the tire provider for the series.

== Teams and drivers ==
=== Full-time teams ===
Chassis manufacturer	Team	No.	Driver	Crew chief	References
Boehler Racing	Boehler Racing Enterprises	3	Tyler Rypkema	Greg Fournier	
FURY	Goodie Racing	58	Eric Goodale	Rob Hyer	
FURY	Hartwig Racing	73	Carson Loftin 1	Paul Hartwig Jr. 1 Bobby Geiger Jr. 15	
FURY	Hartwig Racing	73	Paulie Hartwig III 15	Paul Hartwig Jr. 1 Bobby Geiger Jr. 15	
FURY	Heagy Motorsports	18	Ken Heagy	Greg Gorman	
FURY	Jon McKennedy Racing	79	Jon McKennedy	Patrick Walsh	
LFR	Eighty-Two Autosport	8	John-Michael Shenette	Scott Morin 11; George Bessette Jr. 5	
LFR	Elite Racing	31	Mike Christopher Jr. 15	Eugene Orlando	
LFR	Elite Racing	31	Craig Lutz 1	Eugene Orlando	
LFR	Teddy Hodgdon Racing	05	Teddy Hodgdon	Ted Hodgdon	
LFR	USNEPower Motorsports	1	Patrick Emerling	Dale Hedquist	
Troyer	KLM Motorsports	64	Austin Beers	Ron Yuhas Jr.	
Troyer	PeeDee Motorsports	60	Matt Hirschman	Mike Stein	
Troyer	Wanick Motorsports	21	Stephen Kopcik	Nick Kopcik	

=== Part-time teams ===
Chassis manufacturer	Team	No.	Driver	Crew chief	Races	References
Apex Race Cars	Apex Racing	95	Cory Plummer	Bill Barnett Jr. 1 Jonah Gosnell 9 Cory Plummer 1	10	
Apex Race Cars	Apex Racing	95	Matt Kimball	Bill Barnett Jr. 1 Jonah Gosnell 9 Cory Plummer 1	1	
FURY	Connolly Racing	4	Ryan Newman	Tim Connolly 1 Ricky Boyer 1	1	
FURY	Connolly Racing	4	Tim Connolly	Tim Connolly 1 Ricky Boyer 1	1	
FURY	Coulter Motorsports	02	Joey Coulter	Harold Holly	1	
FURY	Fueled Up Motorsports	15	Joey Cipriano III	Ryan Plourde	4	
FURY	Goodie Racing	46	Craig Lutz	Douglas Ogiejko	5	
FURY	Haydt Yannone Racing	16	Ron Silk	Phil Moran	6	
FURY	Highmark Racing Team	4	Joey Braun	Douglas Ogiejko	2	
FURY	Kenneth Massa Motorsports	51	Justin Bonsignore	Ryan Stone	9	
FURY	Kyle Bonsignore	22	Kyle Bonsignore	Cam McDermott	4	
FURY	Matt Swanson	89	Matt Swanson	John Swanson	6	
FURY	Perry Racing	2	Jacob Perry	Michael Dayton	2	
FURY	Ryan Preece Racing	40	Ryan Preece	Jeff Preece	2	
FURY	Team 25 LLC	25	Danny Bohn	Terry Hall	1	
FURY	Turbush Racing	81	Mark Stewart	Chris Turbush	2	
FURY	Turbush Racing	88	Roger Turbush	Dan Hansen	3	
LFR	Danny Watts Racing	82	Andrew Molleur	Michael Molleur	15	
LFR	Dave Brigati	00	Chris Rogers Jr.	Brian Schwarz	2	
LFR	Elite Racing	12	Craig Lutz	Joey Mucciacciaro	2	
LFR	Ferguson Motorsports	11	Eric Berndt	Chuck Madigan Jr.	1	
LFR	Gershow Motorsports	2	Jimmy Blewett	Mike Bologna	1	
LFR	Gershow Motorsports	2	Chase Grennan	Mike Bologna	2	
LFR	Glenn Styres Racing	0	Ryan Newman	Randy Renfrow 1 Max Zachem 1	2	
LFR	Jerry Solomito Sr.	66	Timmy Solomito	Jerry Solomito Sr. 3 Shawn Solomito 1	4	
LFR	Jett Motorsports	28	Doug Coby	John McKenna	9	
LFR	Michele Davini	17	Anthony Nocella	Chris McTaggart	5	
LFR	Mike Christopher	13	Mike Christopher Jr.	Joey Mucciacciaro	1	
LFR	Newman Motorsports	11	Norman Newman	Norman Newman	1	
LFR	SS Motorsports	70	Andy Seuss	Jon Marlott	2	
LFR	Supreme Racing	24	Andrew Krause	Steven Reed	4	
LFR	Tinio Racing	44	Chase Dowling	Danny Gamache	7	
LFR	Kimball Motorsports	43	Matt Kimball	Angelo Evans	1	
LFR	Zacharias Motorsports	71	Jimmy Zacharias	Austin Kochenash	3	
PSR Products	Frank Fleming Motorsports	40	Luke Fleming	Chris Fleming 1 Frank Fleming 1	1	
PSR Products	PSR Racing	38	Bobby Labonte	Phil Stefanelli 1 Neal Cantor 1	1	
PSR Products	PSR Racing	38	Jack Baldwin	Phil Stefanelli 1 Neal Cantor 1	1	
PSR Products	PSR Racing	39	Conner Jones	Eddie Harvey	1	
PSR Products	Tommy Baldwin Racing	7	Luke Baldwin	Tommy Baldwin Jr.	3	
Troyer	Catalano Motorsports	45	Timmy Catalano	Tyler Catalano	1	
Troyer	Catalano Motorsports	54	Tommy Catalano	Rick Kluth	14	
Troyer	Catalano Motorsports	56	Trevor Catalano	David Catalano	14	
Troyer	Catalano Motorsports	84	Tyler Catalano	Tom Fuchs	2	
Troyer	Chase Grennan	38	Owen Grennan	Andrew Farnhan	1	
Troyer	GSR Motorsports	55	Jeremy Gerstner	Keith Wheeler	3	
Troyer	Jody Lauzon	59	Andy Jankowiak	Steve Mendoza	1	
Troyer	John Morgan	20	Max Zachem	Ryan Morgan	5	
Troyer	JT Motorsports	99	Sam Rameau	Charlie Barham	1	
Troyer	Peter Clark Motorsports	96	Matt Brode	Marty Condit	2	
Troyer	Ronnie Williams	50	Ronnie Williams	Adam Skowyra	8	
Troyer	TJS Holdings	6	Cory DiMatteo	John Lowinski	3	
Troyer	TLC Performance	29	Mike Marshall	Doug Tisdell	1	
Troyer	Wanick Motorsports	9	Jayden Harman	Mark Harman	4	
Troyer	Wanick Motorsports	19	Tommy Wanick	Mike Odwanzy	2	
FURY 10 Troyer 3	Sapienza Racing	36	Dave Sapienza	Greg Kleila	12	
FURY 10 Troyer 3	Sapienza Racing	36	Mark Stewart	Greg Kleila	1	

== Schedule ==
No.	Race title	Track	Date
1	New Smyrna Beach Area Visitors Bureau 200	New Smyrna Speedway, New Smyrna Beach, Florida	February 7
2	Virginia is for Racing Lovers 200	Martinsville Speedway, Martinsville, Virginia	March 28 (Note: NASCAR postponed the race from its March 27 date to March 28 due to inclement weather.)
3	Icebreaker 150	Thompson Speedway Motorsports Park, Thompson, Connecticut	April 12
4	J&R Precast 150	Seekonk Speedway, Seekonk, Massachusetts	May 16
5	Miller Lite Salutes Don Howe 200	Riverhead Raceway, Riverhead, New York	May 30
6	All States Materials Group 150	Oxford Plains Speedway, Oxford, Maine	June 6 (Note: NASCAR postponed the race from its May 2 date to June 6 due to inclement weather.)
7	Firecracker 150 presented by the Bethesda Leadership Group	Seekonk Speedway, Seekonk, Massachusetts	July 1
8	Clash at Claremont	Claremont Motorsports Park, Claremont, New Hampshire	July 10
9	Thunder in the Mountains 200	White Mountain Motorsports Park, North Woodstock, New Hampshire	July 19 (Note: NASCAR postponed the race from its June 20 date to July 18 due to inclement weather. It was then later postponed to July 19 because of similar conditions.)
10	Duel at the Dog 200 powered by USNE	Monadnock Speedway, Winchester, New Hampshire	July 25
11	Thompson 150 presented by FloSports.com	Thompson Speedway Motorsports Park, Thompson, Connecticut	August 5
12	Mohegan Sun 100	New Hampshire Motor Speedway, Loudon, New Hampshire	August 22
13	GAF 150	Stafford Motor Speedway, Stafford, Connecticut	August 28
14	Toyota Mod Classic 150	Oswego Speedway, Oswego, New York	September 5
15	Eddie Partridge 206	Riverhead Raceway, Riverhead, New York	September 19
16	World Series 150	Thompson Speedway Motorsports Park, Thompson, Connecticut	October 10 (Note: NASCAR moved the race from its October 11 date to October 10 due to inclement weather.)

=== Schedule changes ===
- The races at Richmond, North Wilkesboro and Lancaster were all dropped.
- Martinsville moves from the season finale in October to March.
- Oxford Plains and Stafford return to the series for the first time since 1991 & 2021, respectively.
- The fall race at Riverhead moves from 256 to 206 laps.

== Results and standings ==
=== Race results ===
No.	Race	Pole position	Most laps led	Winning driver
1	New Smyrna Beach Visitors Bureau 200	Justin Bonsignore	Justin Bonsignore	Justin Bonsignore
2	Virginia is for Racing Lovers 200	Patrick Emerling	Stephen Kopcik	Stephen Kopcik
3	Icebreaker 150	Matt Hirschman	Jon McKennedy	Stephen Kopcik
4	J&R Precast 150	Justin Bonsignore	Stephen Kopcik	Jon McKennedy
5	Miller Lite Salutes Don Howe 200	Roger Turbush	Mark Stewart	Mark Stewart
6	All States Materials Group 150	Stephen Kopcik	Jon McKennedy	Jon McKennedy
7	Firecracker 150 presented by the Bethesda Leadership Group	Austin Beers	Stephen Kopcik	Matt Hirschman
8	Clash at Claremont	Matt Hirschman	Patrick Emerling	Patrick Emerling
9	Thunder in the Mountains 200	Matt Hirschman	Patrick Emerling	Patrick Emerling
10	Duel at the Dog 200 powered by USNE	Matt Hirschman	Patrick Emerling	Patrick Emerling
11	Thompson 150 presented by FloSports.com	Austin Beers	Matt Hirschman	Matt Hirschman
12	Mohegan Sun 100	Austin Beers	Chase Dowling; Austin Beers (Note: Dowling and Beers both led 33 laps.)	Jon McKennedy
13	GAF 150	Justin Bonsignore	Stephen Kopcik	Teddy Hodgdon
14	Toyota Mod Classic 150	Austin Beers	Patrick Emerling	Patrick Emerling
15	Eddie Partridge 206	Justin Bonsignore	Patrick Emerling	Patrick Emerling
16	World Series 150	Paulie Hartwig III	Paulie Hartwig III	Teddy Hodgdon

=== Drivers' championship ===
(key) Bold – Pole position awarded by time. Italics – Pole position set by final practice results or rainout. * – Most laps led. ** – All laps led.

Pos	Driver	NSM	MAR	THO	SEE	RIV	OXF	SEE	CLM	WMM	MON	THO	NHA	STA	OSW	RIV	THO	Points
1	Patrick Emerling	4	**6**	13	6	5	7	3	1*	1*	1*	3	30	5	1*	1*	3	643
2	Austin Beers	3	5	6	4	7	11	5	4	2	3	**2**	**19***	15	**6**	8	7	607
3	Jon McKennedy	6	27	4*	1	8	1*	9	3	12	8	24	1	6	2	12	12	585
4	Matt Hirschman	12	12	**5**	20	17	16	1	**2**	**5**	**12**	1*	11	2	8	23	2	571
5	Stephen Kopcik	13	1*	1	2*	9	14	4*	19	11	10	8	17	7*	10	20	9	566
6	Tyler Rypkema	2	3	10	22	24	2	13	11	4	2	10	4	12	3	4	13	566
7	Eric Goodale	10	4	12	18	10	3	6	9	7	7	6	23	9	7	5	6	562
8	Teddy Hodgdon	11	28	11	7	16	9	7	7	10	6	13	9	1	4	21	1	551
9	Mike Christopher Jr.	19	15	3	16	19	12	11	8	6	21	12	6	8	5	15	4	525
10	Paulie Hartwig III		29	28	15	12	5	10	5	3	4	7	13	10	9	2	**11***	502
11	Andrew Molleur		13	17	10	14	8	8	10	9	14	14	10	11	11	11	10	491
12	Tommy Catalano	17	8	19	5	4	13	15	12	13	5	11	2	18	17			459
13	Trevor Catalano	9	11	29	14	13	6	16	13	18	15	17	5	24	12			414
14	John-Michael Shenette	18	20	23	25	20	10	19	16	17	17	18	20	23	14	19	21	404
15	Ken Heagy	22	25	25	26	18	17	18	18	15	20	16	22	22	15	16	18	391
16	Justin Bonsignore	**1***	24	7	**11**	2							24	**4**		**3**	Wth	289
17	Doug Coby			18	9			14		8	9	9	14	13			14	288
18	Chase Dowling			9	3			2				4	7*	3			8	275
19	Craig Lutz	5	14	8	12	23	Wth				19		12			10		249
20	Dave Sapienza	DNQ	31	16	23		Wth	17		Wth	Wth	15	8	25		18	15	228
21	Cory Plummer	DNQ	22	26	24	21	Wth		17	16	18	19	25	Wth				216
22	Matt Swanson			15	13			12				5		17			5	197
23	Ronnie Williams			27			4			Wth	11	21	15	19			Wth	167
24	Ron Silk	32	2	2	21	6	Wth					Wth						158
25	Max Zachem	16		24					6			23		16				136
26	Jayden Harman				8				15	14	16							123
27	Joey Cipriano III			21	17				14					14				110
28	Anthony Nocella						15			Wth	13		26				16	106
29	Mark Stewart	21				1*										13		102
30	Kyle Bonsignore	27	7	22	19		Wth											101
31	Ryan Newman	8	10										18					96
32	Timmy Solomito	26	9			Wth										7		90
33	Roger Turbush					**15**										9	20	89
34	Ryan Preece	7											3					79
35	Andrew Krause	28	30	20								22						77
36	Cory DiMatteo											20	21	20				71
37	Joey Braun															6	19	63
38	Chase Grennan					11										14		63
39	Luke Baldwin	23	23										28					58
40	Jimmy Zacharias	14	18	Wth														56
41	Jacob Perry												16				17	55
42	Chris Rogers Jr.					25										17		46
43	Jeremy Gerstner	24	19	Wth														45
44	Matt Brode					22										22		44
45	Owen Grennan					3												41
46	Matt Kimball												27	21				40
47	Andy Seuss		26										29					33
48	Luke Fleming	DNQ	21															32
49	Timmy Catalano														13			31
50	Eric Berndt			14														30
51	Joey Coulter	15																29
52	Danny Bohn		16															28
53	Tim Connolly														16			28
54	Jack Baldwin		17															27
55	Tyler Catalano						18						Wth					26
56	Carson Loftin	20																24
57	Jimmy Blewett	25	Wth															19
58	Sam Rameau	29																15
59	Mike Marshall	30																14
60	Bobby Labonte	31																13
	Conner Jones	DNQ																
	Norman Newman	DNQ																
	Andy Jankowiak	Wth																
	Tommy Wanick							Wth		Wth								

== See also ==
- 2026 NASCAR Cup Series
- 2026 NASCAR O'Reilly Auto Parts Series
- 2026 NASCAR Craftsman Truck Series
- 2026 ARCA Menards Series
- 2026 ARCA Menards Series East
- 2026 ARCA Menards Series West
- 2026 NASCAR Euro Series
- 2026 NASCAR Canada Series
- 2026 NASCAR Brasil Series
- 2026 CARS Tour
- 2026 SMART Modified Tour
