= Matt Hirschman =

American racing driver

- Born: November 29, 1982 (age 43) Northampton, Pennsylvania, U.S.

NASCAR Whelen Modified Tour career
- Debut season: 2005
- Current team: PeeDee Motorsports
- Years active: 2005–present
- Car number: 60
- Crew chief: Mike Stein
- Starts: 168
- Championships: 0
- Wins: 12
- Poles: 23
- Best finish: 2nd in 2008
- Finished last season: 4th (2026)
- Statistics up to date as of October 12, 2026.

Matt Hirschman (born November 29, 1982) is an American professional stock car racing driver who competes full-time in the NASCAR Whelen Modified Tour, driving the No. 60 for PeeDee Motorsports. He is the son of former series champion Tony Hirschman Jr., and the brother of current NASCAR Cup Series spotter Tony Hirschman III.

Hirschman has also competed in series such as what is now known as the ARCA Menards Series East, SMART Modified Tour, the now defunct NASCAR Whelen Southern Modified Tour and SRX Series, the Modified Racing Series, the Tri-Track Open Modified Series, the Race of Champions Asphalt Modified Tour, and the World Series of Asphalt Stock Car Racing.

== Motorsports results ==
=== NASCAR ===
(key) (Bold – Pole position awarded by qualifying time. Italics – Pole position earned by points standings or practice time. * – Most laps led.)

==== Camping World East Series ====
NASCAR Camping World East Series results
Year	Team	No.	Make	1	2	3	4	5	6	7	8	9	10	11	12	13	NCWESC	Pts	Ref
2008	Dave Davis w/ Gillett Evernham Motorsports	9	Dodge	GRE	IOW	SBO	GLN	NHA	TMP	NSH	ADI	LRP	MFD	NHA; 4	DOV; 6	STA	37th	315	

==== Whelen Modified Tour ====
NASCAR Whelen Modified Tour results
Year	Car owner	No.	Make	1	2	3	4	5	6	7	8	9	10	11	12	13	14	15	16	17	18	NWMTC	Pts	Ref
2005	Ed Bennett III	59	Dodge	TMP	STA	RIV	WFD; 8	STA	JEN; 10	NHA	BEE	SEE; 27	RIV	STA; 17	TMP; 28	WFD; 22	MAR	TMP	NHA	STA	TMP; 24	36th	737	
2006	Ed Bennett III	59	Dodge	TMP; 35	STA; 8	JEN; 14	TMP; 33	STA; 9	NHA; 24	HOL; 16	RIV; 13	STA; 4	TMP; 26	MAR; 7	TMP; 8*	NHA; 13	WFD; 16	TMP; 14	STA; 12			11th	1873	
2007	Ed Bennett III	59	Dodge	TMP; 5	STA; 8	WTO; 6	STA; 6	TMP; 13	NHA; 4	**TSA**; 2		STA; 6	TMP; 12	MAN; 7				STA; 4	TMP; 3			3rd	2260	
2007	Ed Bennett III	59	Chevy								RIV; 7				MAR; 16	NHA; 31	TMP; 11					3rd	2260	
2008	Ed Bennett III	59	Chevy	TMP; 16	STA; 14	STA; 10	TMP; 7	NHA; 12	SPE; 1*	RIV; 16	STA; 4	TMP; 2	MAN; 6	TMP; 9	NHA; 6	MAR; 2	**CHE**; 1**	STA; 2	TMP; 25			2nd	2314	
2009	Matt Hirschman	60	Chevy	TMP	STA; 21	STA	NHA	SPE	RIV	STA												43rd	185	
2009	Nancy Goodale	50	Chevy								BRI; 26	TMP	NHA	MAR	STA	TMP						43rd	185	
2011	Boehler Racing Enterprises	3	Chevy	TMP; 9	STA; 8	STA; 10	MND; 3	TMP; 12	NHA; 3	RIV; 13	STA; 13	NHA; 22	BRI; 11	DEL; 12	TMP; 15	LRP; 12	NHA; 9	STA; 8	TMP; 3			6th	2163	
2012	Nancy Goodale	50	Chevy	TMP	STA	MND	STA	WFD	NHA	STA	TMP	BRI	TMP	RIV	NHA; 8	STA; 10	TMP					31st	70	
2013	Mike Curb	44	Chevy	TMP	STA	STA	WFD	RIV; 12	NHA	MND	STA	TMP	BRI	RIV	NHA	STA						34th	70	
2013	Matt Hirschman	60	Chevy														TMP; 7					34th	70	
2014	Wayne Darling	52	Chevy	TMP; 11	STA; 9	STA; 14	WFD; 24	RIV; 3	NHA; 12	MND; 6	STA; 10	TMP; 2	BRI; 17	NHA; 26	STA	TMP; 6						13th	388	
2016	PeeDee Motorsports	60	Chevy	TMP	STA	WFD	STA	TMP	RIV	NHA	MND	STA	TMP	BRI	RIV	OSW	SEE; 4	NHA	STA	TMP		42nd	40	
2017	PeeDee Motorsports	60	Chevy	MYR; 17	TMP	STA	LGY	TMP	RIV	NHA	STA	TMP	BRI	**SEE**; 7	**OSW**; 2*	RIV	NHA	STA	TMP			38th	109	
2018	PeeDee Motorsports	60	Chevy	**MYR**; 3*	TMP	STA	SEE; 3	TMP	LGY; 3	RIV	NHA	STA	TMP	BRI	**OSW**; 1*	RIV	NHA	STA	TMP			32nd	175	
2019	PeeDee Motorsports	60	Chevy	MYR; 11	SBO	TMP	STA	WAL	SEE; 12	TMP	RIV	NHA	STA	TMP	OSW; 3	RIV	NHA	STA	TMP			36th	108	
2020	PeeDee Motorsports	60	Chevy	JEN; 4	**WMM**; 2*	WMM	JEN	MND; 6	TMP	NHA	STA	TMP										26th	122	
2021	PeeDee Motorsports	60	Chevy	MAR	STA	RIV	JEN	OSW; 1*	RIV	NHA	NRP	STA	**BEE**; 2*	OSW; 2	RCH	RIV	STA					27th	134	
2022	PeeDee Motorsports	60	Chevy	**NSM**; 1*	RCH	RIV	LEE; 3*	JEN	MND; 2	RIV	WAL; 2	NHA	CLM; 4	TMP	LGY	**OSW**; 5	RIV	TMP	**MAR**; 2			17th	300	
2023	PeeDee Motorsports	60	Chevy	NSM; 3	RCH; 18	MON; 9	RIV	LEE; 1*	**SEE**; 1**	RIV; 15	WAL; 7	NHA	LMP; 2	THO; 20	LGY	OSW	MON	RIV	NWS; 1*	THO	MAR; 4	10th	420	
2024	PeeDee Motorsports	60	Chevy	NSM; 10	RCH	THO; 9	**MON**; 5	RIV	**SEE**; 1	NHA	MON; 4	LMP; 4	THO; 22	**OSW**; 2*	RIV	MON; 3*	THO; 5	NWS; 2	MAR; 2			7th	485	
2025	PeeDee Motorsports	60	Chevy	NSM; 15	THO; 11	NWS; 22	**SEE**; 1*	RIV; 2	WMM; 4	**LMP**; 3*	MON; 17	MON; 3	THO; 2	RCH; 6	**OSW**; 5*	NHA; 5	RIV; 15	THO; 4	MAR; 9			4th	597	
2026	PeeDee Motorsports	60	Chevy	NSM; 12	MAR; 12	**THO**; 5	SEE; 20	RIV; 17	OXF; 16	SEE; 1	**CLM**; 2	**WMM**; 5	**MON**; 12	THO; 1*	NHA; 11	STA; 2	OSW; 8	RIV; 23	THO; 2			4th	571	

==== Whelen Southern Modified Tour ====
NASCAR Whelen Southern Modified Tour results
Year	Car owner	No.	Make	1	2	3	4	5	6	7	8	9	10	11	12	NWSMTC	Pts	Ref
2007	Pat Bennett	59	Chevy	CRW; 4	FAI	GRE; 11*	CRW	CRW	BGS	MAR	ACE	CRW	SNM	CRW	CRW	31st	290	
2008	Jillian Leonard	59	Chevy	CRW; 8	ACE	CRW	BGS	CRW	LAN	CRW	SNM	MAR	CRW	CRW		34th	142	
2012	Nancy Goodale	50	Chevy	CRW	CRW	SBO	CRW	CRW	BGS	BRI	LGY	THO; 2	CRW	CLT		34th	42	

=== Superstar Racing Experience ===
(key) * – Most laps led. ^{1} – Heat 1 winner. ^{2} – Heat 2 winner.

Superstar Racing Experience results
Year	No.	1	2	3	4	5	6	SRXC	Pts
2022	60	FIF	SBO	STA; 8	NSV	I55	SHA	23rd	0^{1}

=== SMART Modified Tour ===
SMART Modified Tour results
Year	Car owner	No.	Make	1	2	3	4	5	6	7	8	9	10	11	12	13	14	SMTC	Pts	Ref
2021	Roy Hall	60	N/A	**CRW**; 1*	FLO	SBO	FCS	CRW	DIL	CAR	CRW	**DOM**; 1*	PUL	HCY	ACE			20th	73	
2022	Roy Hall	60	N/A	FLO; 1*	SNM; 1	CRW; 4	**SBO**; 1*	FCS	CRW	**NWS**; 3	**NWS**; 1*	CAR	DOM; 1*	HCY; 1*	TRI	PUL		7th	256	
2023	Roy Hall	60	N/A	FLO; 1	CRW	SBO; 15	HCY	FCS	CRW	ACE	CAR	**PUL**; 2	TRI	SBO	ROU			25th	114	
2024	Roy Hall	60	N/A	**FLO**; 12*	CRW; 9	SBO; 2*	TRI	ROU	**HCY**; 3*	FCS	CRW	JAC	CAR	CRW	DOM	SBO	**NWS**; 2	19th	195	
2025	Roy Hall	60	N/A	FLO	AND	**SBO**; 1*	ROU	HCY; 4	FCS	CRW	CPS	CAR	CRW	DOM	FCS	TRI	NWS	27th	86	
