= Ken Heagy =

American racing driver (born 1967)

- Born: June 13, 1967 (age 59) Calverton, New York, U.S.

NASCAR Whelen Modified Tour career
- Debut season: 1987
- Current team: Heagy Motorsports
- Years active: 1987, 1989, 1991, 1997–present
- Car number: 18
- Crew chief: Greg Gorman
- Starts: 239
- Championships: 0
- Wins: 0
- Poles: 0
- Best finish: 8th in 2023
- Finished last season: 15th (2026)
- Statistics up to date as of October 12, 2026.

Kenneth Heagy (born June 13, 1967) is an American professional stock car racing driver who competes full-time in the NASCAR Whelen Modified Tour, driving the No. 18 for Heagy Motorsports. His home track is Riverhead Raceway, where he has eight career wins in the modified division.

Heagy is a long-time competitor of the tour, having made his debut at Thompson Speedway Motorsports Park in 1987.

Heagy has previously competed in the Modified Racing Series.

== Motorsports results ==
=== NASCAR ===
(key) (Bold – Pole position awarded by qualifying time. Italics – Pole position earned by points standings or practice time. * – Most laps led.)

==== Whelen Modified Tour ====
NASCAR Whelen Modified Tour results
Year	Team	No.	Make	1	2	3	4	5	6	7	8	9	10	11	12	13	14	15	16	17	18	19	20	21	22	23	24	25	26	27	28	NWMTC	Pts	Ref
1987	N/A	41	N/A	ROU	MAR	TMP	STA	CNB	STA	MND	WFD	JEN	SPE	RIV	TMP	RPS	EPP	RIV	STA	TMP	RIV	SEE	STA	POC	TIO	TMP; 41	OXF	TMP	ROU	MAR	STA	N/A	0	
1989	Exxon Racing	33	Chevy	MAR	TMP	MAR	JEN	STA	IRP	OSW	WFD	MND	RIV	OSW	JEN	STA	RPS	RIV	OSW	TMP; 22	TMP	RPS	OSW	TMP								N/A	0	
1989	Exxon Racing	38	Chevy																						POC; 51	STA	TIO	MAR	TMP			N/A	0	
1991	Ken Heagy	33	Chevy	MAR	RCH	TMP	NHA	MAR	NZH	STA	TMP	FLE	OXF	RIV	JEN	STA	RPS	RIV	RCH	TMP	NHA	TMP	POC; 47	STA	TMP	MAR						N/A	0	
1997	N/A	N/A	N/A	TMP	MAR	STA	NZH	STA	NHA	FLE	JEN	RIV	GLN	NHA	RPS	HOL	TMP	RIV	NHA	GLN	STA	NHA	STA	FLE; DNQ	TMP	RCH						N/A	0	
1998	N/A	83	Pontiac	RPS	TMP	MAR	STA	NZH	STA	GLN	JEN	RIV	NHA	NHA	LEE	HOL	TMP	NHA	RIV; 25	STA	NHA	TMP	STA	TMP	FLE							N/A	0	
1999	N/A	38	Pontiac	TMP	RPS	STA	RCH	STA	RIV; 24	JEN	NHA	NZH	HOL	TMP	NHA	RIV; 27	GLN	STA	RPS	TMP	NHA	STA	MAR	TMP; DNQ								N/A	0	
2000	N/A	08	Pontiac	STA	RCH; DNQ	STA	RIV; 26	SEE	NHA	NZH	TMP	RIV; DNQ	GLN	TMP	STA	WFD	NHA	STA	MAR	TMP; DNQ												90th	49	
2001	N/A	08	Pontiac	SBO	TMP	STA	WFD	NZH	STA	RIV; 27	SEE	RCH	NHA	HOL	RIV; 12	CHE	TMP	STA	WFD	TMP	STA	MAR; DNQ	TMP									56th	264	
2002	N/A	45	N/A	TMP	STA	WFD	NZH	RIV	SEE	RCH	STA	BEE	NHA	RIV; DNQ	TMP	STA	WFD	TMP	NHA	STA	MAR; DNQ	TMP; DNQ										N/A	0	
2003	N/A	38	N/A	TMP	STA	WFD	NZH	STA	LER	BLL	BEE	NHA	ADI	RIV; DNQ	TMP	STA	WFD	TMP	NHA	STA	TMP											N/A	0	
2004	Donnie Fleming	38	Chevy	TMP	STA	WFD	NZH	STA	RIV	LER	WAL	BEE	NHA	SEE	RIV; 15	STA	TMP	WFD	TMP	NHA	STA	TMP										76th	118	
2006	Donnie Fleming	38	Chevy	TMP; DNQ	STA; DNQ	JEN; DNQ	TMP; DNQ	STA	NHA	HOL	RIV; 26	STA	TMP	MAR; DNQ	TMP	NHA	WFD	TMP	STA													47th	225	
2007	Donnie Fleming	38	Chevy	TMP; DNQ	STA	WTO	STA	TMP	NHA	TSA	RIV	STA	TMP; 20	MAN	MAR	NHA	TMP; 30	STA	TMP													50th	198	
2008	Ed Partridge	12	Chevy	TMP; 15	STA; 12	STA; 18								TMP; 18	NHA; 12	MAR; 23	CHE; 14															14th	1800	
2008	Ed Partridge	12	Ford				TMP; 15	NHA; 31	SPE; 18	RIV; 6	STA; 21	TMP; 17	MAN; 16					STA; 22	TMP; 13													14th	1800	
2009	Robert Pollifrone	18	Chevy	TMP; 22	STA; 19	STA; 22	NHA; 13	SPE; 18	RIV; 21	STA; 25	BRI; 17	TMP; 19	NHA; 21		STA; 12	TMP; 22																17th	1369	
2009	Robert Pollifrone	13	Chevy											MAR; 19																		17th	1369	
2010	Robert Pollifrone	18	Chevy	TMP; 35	STA; 31	STA	MAR																									30th	889	
2010	Robert Pollifrone	18	Ford					NHA; 17	LIM	MND	RIV	STA; 14	TMP; 26	BRI	NHA; 12	STA; 10	TMP; 18															30th	889	
2011	Robert Pollifrone	18	Ford	TMP; 13	STA; 13	STA; 19			NHA; 20		STA; 28	NHA; 31	BRI	DEL																		21st	1312	
2011	Robert Pollifrone	18	Chevy				MND; 25	TMP; 21		RIV; 20					TMP; 22	LRP	NHA; 19	STA; 14	TMP; 24													21st	1312	
2012	Robert Pollifrone	18	Chevy	TMP; 28	STA; 21	MND; 15		WFD; 18				BRI; 6	TMP; 24	RIV; 23	NHA; 27	STA																22nd	298	
2012	Robert Pollifrone	18	Ford				STA; 21		NHA; 31	STA; 17	TMP; 16						TMP; 27															22nd	298	
2013	Robert Pollifrone	18	Ford	TMP; 15	STA; 13	STA; 28			NHA; 13		STA; 23		BRI; 12		NHA; 20	STA; 12	TMP; 24															15th	368	
2013	Robert Pollifrone	18	Chevy				WFD; 18	RIV; 7		MND; 21		TMP; 24		RIV; 20																		15th	368	
2014	Robert Pollifrone	18	Ford	TMP; 12	STA; 21	STA; 23	WFD; 14		NHA; 26																							22nd	246	
2014	Robert Pollifrone	18	Chevy					RIV; 11		MND; 14	STA	TMP	BRI	NHA; 27	STA; 16	TMP; 30																22nd	246	
2015	Robert Pollifrone	18	Chevy	TMP; 30	STA; 15	WAT; 26	STA; 21	TMP	RIV; 24	NHA; 21	MON; 19	STA; 24	TMP; 21	BRI; 16	RIV; 14	NHA; 13	STA; 9	TMP; 19														19th	344	
2016	Robert Pollifrone	18	Chevy	TMP; Wth	STA; 18	WFD; 13	STA; 18	TMP; 10	RIV; 14	NHA; 30	MND; Wth	STA; 24	TMP; Wth	BRI; Wth	RIV; 25	OSW; Wth	SEE; Wth	NHA	STA; 22	TMP; Wth												26th	222	
2017	Greg Gorman	18	Chevy	MYR	TMP	STA	LGY	TMP	RIV	NHA	STA	TMP	BRI	SEE	OSW	RIV	NHA	STA; 18	TMP; 34													55th	36	
2018	Robert Pollifrone	18	Chevy	MYR; 26	TMP; Wth	STA; 15	SEE; 16	TMP; 23		RIV; 21																						19th	354	
2018	Robert Pollifrone	18	Ford						LGY; 18		NHA; 24	STA; 18	TMP; 25	BRI; 20	OSW; 13	RIV; 21	NHA; 24	STA; 20	TMP; 22													19th	354	
2019	Robert Pollifrone	18	Ford	MYR; 16	SBO; 19	TMP; 23	STA; 29	WAL; 7	SEE; 24	TMP; 20	RIV; 27	NHA; Wth	STA; Wth	TMP; 21	OSW; Wth	RIV; 27	NHA; 25	STA; 20	TMP; 37													22nd	278	
2020	Robert Pollifrone	18	Chevy	JEN	WMM	WMM; Wth	JEN	MND	TMP	NHA	STA	TMP; 16																				42nd	28	
2021	Robert Pollifrone	18	Chevy	MAR; Wth		RIV; Wth	JEN	OSW	RIV		NRP; 13	STA; 18	BEE; Wth	OSW	RCH	RIV; 21	STA; 23															24th	153	
2021	Robert Pollifrone	18	Ford		STA; 21					NHA; 15																						24th	153	
2022	Robert Pollifrone	18	Chevy	NSM; 22	RCH; Wth	RIV; 19	LEE	JEN	MND; 17	RIV; 24	WAL	NHA; 15	CLM; 17	TMP; 11	LGY; 10	OSW; 18	RIV; 15	TMP; 13	MAR; 27													16th	320	
2023	Robert Pollifrone	18	Chevy	NSM; 21	RCH; 17	MON; 20	RIV; 25	LEE; 18	SEE; 16	RIV; 21	WAL; 13	NHA; 25	LMP; 19	THO; 14	LGY; 13	OSW; 11	MON; 17	RIV; 10	NWS; 32	THO; 19	MAR; 20											8th	461	
2024	Robert Pollifrone	18	Chevy	NSM; 20	RCH; 18	THO; 14	MON; 18	RIV; 17	SEE; 22	NHA; 19	MON; 18	LMP; 12	THO; 20	OSW; 16	RIV; 14	MON; 18	THO; 19	NWS; 17	MAR; 19													11th	423	
2025	Christopher Fleming	18	Chevy	NSM; 19	THO; 23	NWS; 11	SEE; 20	RIV; 18	WMM; 14	LMP; 18	MON; 23	MON; 23	THO; 21	RCH; 12	OSW; 14	NHA; 13	RIV; 12	THO; 18	MAR; 19													12th	427	
2026	Heagy Motorsports	18	Chevy	NSM; 22	MAR; 25	THO; 25	SEE; 26	RIV; 18	OXF; 17	SEE; 18	CLM; 18	WMM; 15	MON; 20	THO; 16	NHA; 22	STA; 22	OSW; 15	RIV; 16	THO; 18													15th	391	

==== Whelen Southern Modified Tour ====
NASCAR Whelen Southern Modified Tour results
Year	Car owner	No.	Make	1	2	3	4	5	6	7	8	9	10	11	12	13	NSWMTC	Pts	Ref
2006	N/A	38	N/A	CRW	GRE	CRW	DUB	CRW	BGS	MAR; DNQ	CRW	ACE	CRW	HCY	DUB	SNM	N/A	0	
