= Brian Sones =

American racing driver (born 1989)

- Nationality: American
- Born: July 16, 1989 (age 37) Sandy Valley, Pennsylvania, U.S.

NASCAR Whelen Modified Tour career
- Debut season: 2025
- Years active: 2025
- Starts: 6
- Championships: 0
- Wins: 0
- Poles: 0
- Best finish: 30th in 2025
- Finished last season: 30th (2025)
- Statistics up to date as of October 24, 2025.

Brian Sones (born July 16, 1989) is an American professional stock car racing driver who last competed part-time in the NASCAR Whelen Modified Tour, driving the No. 12 for Dennis Wenner.

Sones has also previously competed in the SMART Modified Tour, the New York Super Stocks Race Series, the Race of Champions Asphalt Modified Tour, and the World Series of Asphalt Stock Car Racing.

== Motorsports results ==
=== NASCAR ===
(key) (Bold – Pole position awarded by qualifying time. Italics – Pole position earned by points standings or practice time. * – Most laps led.)

==== Whelen Modified Tour ====
NASCAR Whelen Modified Tour results
| Year | Car owner | No. | Make | 1 | 2 | 3 | 4 | 5 | 6 | 7 | 8 | 9 | 10 | 11 | 12 | 13 | 14 | 15 | 16 | NWMTC | Pts | Ref |
|---|---|---|---|---|---|---|---|---|---|---|---|---|---|---|---|---|---|---|---|---|---|---|
| 2025 | Dennis Wenner | 12 | Chevy | NSM; 30 | THO; 24 | NWS; 26 | SEE | RIV | WMM | LMP | MON; Wth | MON; Wth | THO; 24 | RCH | OSW; 15 | NHA | RIV | THO; 24 | MAR | 30th | 121 | |

=== SMART Modified Tour ===
SMART Modified Tour results
| Year | Car owner | No. | Make | 1 | 2 | 3 | 4 | 5 | 6 | 7 | 8 | 9 | 10 | 11 | 12 | 13 | SMTC | Pts | Ref |
|---|---|---|---|---|---|---|---|---|---|---|---|---|---|---|---|---|---|---|---|
| 2022 | Dennis Wenner | 12 | N/A | FLO | SNM | CRW | SBO | FCS | CRW | NWS; 31 | NWS | CAR | DOM | HCY | TRI | PUL | N/A | 0 | |
