= Norman Newman =

Canadian racing driver (born 1985)

- Born: March 11, 1985 (age 41) Kincardine, Ontario, Canada

NASCAR Whelen Modified Tour career
- Debut season: 2025
- Current team: Percy Newman
- Years active: 2025–present
- Car number: 11
- Crew chief: Norman Newman
- Starts: 2
- Championships: 0
- Wins: 0
- Poles: 0
- Best finish: 52nd in 2025
- Finished last season: 52nd (2025)
- Statistics up to date as of October 24, 2025.

Norman Howard Newman (born March 11, 1985) is a Canadian professional stock car racing driver who currently competes part-time in the NASCAR Whelen Modified Tour, driving the No. 11 for Percy Newman.

Newman has also previously competed in the SMART Modified Tour, the OSCAAR Modified Series, the OSCAAR Pro Sprint Series, and the World Series of Asphalt Stock Car Racing.

== Motorsports results ==
=== NASCAR ===
(key) (Bold – Pole position awarded by qualifying time. Italics – Pole position earned by points standings or practice time. * – Most laps led.)

==== Whelen Modified Tour ====
NASCAR Whelen Modified Tour results
| Year | Car owner | No. | Make | 1 | 2 | 3 | 4 | 5 | 6 | 7 | 8 | 9 | 10 | 11 | 12 | 13 | 14 | 15 | 16 | NWMTC | Pts | Ref |
|---|---|---|---|---|---|---|---|---|---|---|---|---|---|---|---|---|---|---|---|---|---|---|
| 2025 | Percy Newman | 11 | Chevy | NSM; 23 | THO | NWS | SEE | RIV | WMM | LMP | MON | MON | THO | RCH | OSW | NHA | RIV | THO | MAR; 27 | 52nd | 38 | |
| 2026 | Percy Newman | 11 | Chevy | NSM; DNQ | MAR | THO | SEE | RIV | OXF | SEE | CLM | WMM | MON | THO | NHA | STA | OSW | RIV | THO | N/A | 0 | |

=== SMART Modified Tour ===
SMART Modified Tour results
| Year | Car owner | No. | Make | 1 | 2 | 3 | 4 | 5 | 6 | 7 | 8 | 9 | 10 | 11 | 12 | 13 | 14 | SMTC | Pts | Ref |
|---|---|---|---|---|---|---|---|---|---|---|---|---|---|---|---|---|---|---|---|---|
| 2024 | Percy Newman | 11 | N/A | FLO | CRW | SBO | TRI | ROU | HCY | FCS | CRW | JAC | CAR | CRW | DOM | SBO | NWS; 19 | 54th | 22 | |
| 2025 | Percy Newman | 11 | N/A | FLO | AND | SBO | ROU | HCY | FCS | CRW | CPS | CAR | CRW | DOM | FCS | TRI | NWS; 22 | 53rd | 19 | |
