= Mark Stewart (racing driver) =

American racing driver (born 1997)

- Nationality: American
- Born: December 27, 1997 (age 28) Riverhead, New York, U.S.

NASCAR Whelen Modified Tour career
- Debut season: 2023
- Current team: Christopher Turbash
- Years active: 2023–present
- Car number: 36
- Crew chief: Chris Turbash
- Starts: 9
- Championships: 0
- Wins: 1
- Poles: 0
- Best finish: 29th in 2026
- Finished last season: 29th (2026)
- Statistics up to date as of October 12, 2026.

Mark Stewart (born December 27, 1997) is an American professional stock car racing driver who currently competes part-time in the NASCAR Whelen Modified Tour, driving the No. 81 for Christopher Turbush. He is the nephew of Chris and Roger Turbush, the latter of which also competes part-time in the series.

In 2026, Stewart got his first career win in the Whelen Modified Tour at Riverhead Raceway.

Stewart has also previously competed in the SMART Modified Tour, EXIT Realty ProTruck Challenge, the Monaco Modified Tri-Track Series, and the NASCAR Weekly Series, and is a frequent competitor at his home track of Riverhead Raceway.

== Motorsports results ==
=== NASCAR ===
(key) (Bold – Pole position awarded by qualifying time. Italics – Pole position earned by points standings or practice time. * – Most laps led.)

==== Whelen Modified Tour ====
NASCAR Whelen Modified Tour results
Year	Car owner	No.	Make	1	2	3	4	5	6	7	8	9	10	11	12	13	14	15	16	17	18	NWMTC	Pts	Ref
2023	Heather Turbush	81	Chevy	NSM	RCH	MON	RIV	LEE	SEE	RIV; 13	WAL	NHA	LMP	THO	LGY	OSW	MON	RIV; 2	NWS	THO	MAR	44th	73	
2024	Heather Turbush	81	Chevy	NSM	RCH	THO	MON	RIV; 10	SEE	NHA	MON	LMP	THO	OSW	RIV; 16	MON	THO	NWS	MAR			49th	62	
2025	Christopher Turbush	81	Chevy	NSM; 17	THO; 17	NWS	SEE	RIV; Wth	WMM	LMP	MON	MON	THO; Wth	RCH	OSW	NHA	RIV; 19	THO	MAR			42nd	79	
2026	Christopher Turbush	81	Chevy	NSM; 21	MAR	THO	SEE											RIV; 13	THO			29th	102	
2026	Sapienza Racing	36	N/A					RIV; 1*	OXF	SEE	CLM	WMM	MON	THO	NHA	STA	OSW					29th	102	

=== SMART Modified Tour ===
SMART Modified Tour results
Year	Car owner	No.	Make	1	2	3	4	5	6	7	8	9	10	11	12	13	SMTC	Pts	Ref
2026	Chris Turbush	81	N/A	FLO	AND	SBO	DOM; 26	HCY	WKS	FCR	CRW	PUL	CAR	ROU	TRI	NWS	73rd	15	
