= Cory Plummer =

American racing driver (born 1991)

- Nationality: American
- Born: February 12, 1991 (age 35) Swanzey, New Hampshire, U.S.

NASCAR Whelen Modified Tour career
- Debut season: 2023
- Current team: Apex Racing
- Years active: 2023, 2026–present
- Car number: 95
- Crew chief: Bill Barnett Jr., Jonah Gosnell
- Starts: 11
- Championships: 0
- Wins: 0
- Poles: 0
- Best finish: 21st in 2026
- Finished last season: 21st (2026)
- Statistics up to date as of October 12, 2026.

Cory Plummer (born February 12, 1991) is an American professional stock car racing driver and team owner who currently competes part-time in the NASCAR Whelen Modified Tour, driving the No. 95 for his own team, Apex Racing.

Plummer has previously competed in series such as the NHSTRA Modified Battle for the Cup, the NHSTRA Mini Stock Battle for the Belt, the Monaco Modified Tri-Track Series, and the NASCAR Local Racing Series.

== Motorsports results ==
=== NASCAR ===
(key) (Bold – Pole position awarded by qualifying time. Italics – Pole position earned by points standings or practice time. * – Most laps led.)

==== Whelen Modified Tour ====
NASCAR Whelen Modified Tour results
Year	Car owner	No.	Make	1	2	3	4	5	6	7	8	9	10	11	12	13	14	15	16	17	18	NWMTC	Pts	Ref
2023	Cory Plummer	1	N/A	NSM	RCH	MON; 29	RIV	LEE	SEE	RIV	WAL	NHA	LMP	THO	LGY	OSW	MON; 19	RIV	NWS	THO	MAR	77th	23	
2026	Apex Racing	95	N/A	NSM; DNQ	MAR; 22	THO; 26	SEE; 24	RIV; 21	OXF; Wth	SEE	CLM; 17	WMM; 16	MON; 18	THO; 19	NHA; 25	STA; Wth	OSW	RIV	THO			21st	216	
