= Matt Kimball =

American racing driver

- Nationality: American
- Born: August 16, 2002 (age 24) Bennington, New Hampshire, U.S.

NASCAR Whelen Modified Tour career
- Debut season: 2022
- Years active: 2022–present
- Starts: 17
- Championships: 0
- Wins: 0
- Poles: 0
- Best finish: 27th in 2024
- Finished last season: 46th (2026)
- Statistics up to date as of October 12, 2026.

Matthew Kimball (born August 16, 2002) is an American professional stock car racing driver who currently competes part-time in the NASCAR Whelen Modified Tour, driving the No. 43 for William Kimball Jr.

Kimball has also competed in series such as the Modified Racing Series, the Tri-Track Open Modified Series, the North East Mini Stock Tour, the NHSTRA Mini Stock Battle for the Belt, the NHSTRA Modified Battle for the Cup, and the Whitcomb 5 Series. He has also competed in various modified events at Monadnock Speedway.

== Motorsports results ==
=== NASCAR ===
(key) (Bold – Pole position awarded by qualifying time. Italics – Pole position earned by points standings or practice time. * – Most laps led.)

==== Whelen Modified Tour ====
NASCAR Whelen Modified Tour results
Year	Car owner	No.	Make	1	2	3	4	5	6	7	8	9	10	11	12	13	14	15	16	17	18	NWMTC	Pts	Ref
2022	Jody Lauzon	59	Dodge	NSM; 19	RCH	RIV	LEE	JEN														36th	106	
2022	Jerel Gomarlo	76	Chevy						MND; 24	RIV	WAL; 17	NHA	CLM; 10	TMP	LGY	OSW	RIV	TMP	MAR			36th	106	
2023	William Kimball Jr.	43	Chevy	NSM; 32	RCH	MON; 15	RIV	LEE; 16	SEE	RIV	WAL	NHA; 23	LMP	THO	LGY	OSW	MON; 10	RIV	NWS	THO	MAR	33rd	124	
2024	William Kimball Jr.	43	Chevy	NSM	RCH	THO	MON; 15	RIV	SEE	NHA; 15	MON; 8	LMP	THO	OSW	RIV	MON; 6	THO	NWS	MAR			27th	132	
2025	William Kimball Jr.	43	Chevy	NSM	THO	NWS	SEE	RIV	WMM	LMP	MON; 26	MON; Wth	THO	RCH	OSW	NHA; 11	RIV	THO	MAR			51st	51	
2026	William Kimball Jr.	43	Chevy	NSM	MAR	THO	SEE	RIV	OXF	SEE	CLM	WMM	MON	THO	NHA; 27							46th	40	
2026	Apex Racing	95	N/A													STA; 21	OSW	RIV	THO			46th	40	

=== SMART Modified Tour ===
SMART Modified Tour results
Year	Car owner	No.	Make	1	2	3	4	5	6	7	8	9	10	11	12	13	14	SMTC	Pts	Ref
2024	William Kimball Jr.	43	N/A	FLO	CRW	SBO	TRI	ROU	HCY	FCS	CRW	JAC	CAR	CRW	DOM	SBO	NWS; 18	52nd	23	
