= Joey Cipriano III =

American racing driver

- Nationality: American
- Born: November 23, 1994 (age 31) Waterbury, Connecticut, U.S.

NASCAR Whelen Modified Tour career
- Debut season: 2019
- Current team: Ed Noble/Glenn Noble
- Years active: 2019–2021, 2024–present
- Car number: 15
- Crew chief: Ryan Plourde
- Starts: 18
- Championships: 0
- Wins: 0
- Poles: 0
- Best finish: 26th in 2025
- Finished last season: 27th (2026)
- Statistics up to date as of October 12, 2026.

Joseph Cipriano III (born November 23, 1994) is an American professional stock car racing driver who competes part-time in the NASCAR Whelen Modified Tour, driving the No. 15 for Ed and Glenn Noble. He started his racing career at the Stafford Motor Speedway, where he has won in both the SK Lite and SK Modified divisions. He is also a crew member on the Haydt Yannone Racing No. 16 driven by Ron Silk.

Cipriano has previously competed in series such as the Modified Racing Series, the Tri-Track Open Modified Series, and the NEMA Lites Series.

== Motorsports results ==
=== NASCAR ===
(key) (Bold – Pole position awarded by qualifying time. Italics – Pole position earned by points standings or practice time. * – Most laps led.)

==== Whelen Modified Tour ====
NASCAR Whelen Modified Tour results
Year	Team	No.	Make	1	2	3	4	5	6	7	8	9	10	11	12	13	14	15	16	NWMTC	Pts	Ref
2019	Steve Greer	19	Chevy	MYR	SBO	TMP	STA; 32	WAL	SEE	TMP	RIV	NHA	STA; 29	TMP	OSW	RIV	NHA	STA; 22	TMP	54th	49	
2020	Kevin Stuart	88	Chevy	JEN	WMM	WMM	JEN	MND	TMP	NHA; 25	STA	TMP								49th	19	
2021	Robert Katon Jr.	88	Chevy	MAR	STA	RIV	JEN	OSW	RIV	NHA	NRP	STA	BEE	OSW	RCH	RIV	STA; 15			57th	29	
2024	Ed Noble	15	Chevy	NSM	RCH	THO	MON; 8	RIV	SEE							MON; 14	THO; 16	NWS	MAR	33rd	107	
2024	Glenn Noble	15	Chevy							NHA; 31	MON	LMP	THO	OSW	RIV					33rd	107	
2025	Glenn Noble	15	Chevy	NSM	THO	NWS; 23	SEE; 19	RIV	WMM; Wth	LMP	MON; 11	MON; 6	THO	RCH	OSW	NHA; 25	RIV	THO; Wth	MAR	26th	136	
2026	Glenn Noble	15	Chevy	NSM	MAR	THO; 21	SEE; 17	RIV	OXF	SEE	CLM; 14	WMM	MON	THO	NHA	STA; 14	OSW	RIV	THO	27th	110	
