= John-Michael Shenette =

American racing driver

- Born: May 20, 1986 (age 40) Worcester, Massachusetts, U.S.

NASCAR Whelen Modified Tour career
- Debut season: 2023
- Current team: Eighty-Two Autosport
- Years active: 2023–present
- Car number: 8
- Crew chief: Scott Morin
- Starts: 32
- Championships: 0
- Wins: 0
- Poles: 0
- Best finish: 14th in 2026
- Finished last season: 14th (2026)
- Statistics up to date as of October 12, 2026.

John-Michael Shenette (born May 20, 1986) is an American professional stock car racing driver and team owner who competes full-time in the NASCAR Whelen Modified Tour, driving and fielding the No. 8 for his own team, Eighty-Two Autosport.

Shenette has previously competed in series such as the SMART Modified Tour, the PASS National Championship Super Late Model Series, the PASS South Super Late Model Series, and the Granite State Pro Stock Series.

== Motorsports results ==
=== NASCAR ===
(key) (Bold – Pole position awarded by qualifying time. Italics – Pole position earned by points standings or practice time. * – Most laps led.)

==== Whelen Modified Tour ====
NASCAR Whelen Modified Tour results
Year	Team	No.	Make	1	2	3	4	5	6	7	8	9	10	11	12	13	14	15	16	17	18	NWMTC	Pts	Ref
2023	Eighty-Two Autosport	28	Chevy	NSM	RCH	MON	RIV	LEE	SEE	RIV	WAL	NHA	LMP	THO	LGY; 12	OSW	MON	RIV	NWS; 37	THO	MAR; 34	52nd	49	
2024	Eighty-Two Autosport	8	Chevy	NSM; 33	RCH	THO	MON	RIV	SEE	NHA; 17	MON; 20	LMP	THO	OSW	RIV	MON	THO	NWS	MAR			50th	62	
2025	Eighty-Two Autosport	8	Chevy	NSM	THO; Wth	NWS; 16	SEE; 22	RIV; 20	WMM	LMP; 19	MON; 25	MON; 22	THO	RCH; 23	OSW	NHA; 14	RIV	THO; 19	MAR; 12			17th	248	
2026	Eighty-Two Autosport	8	Chevy	NSM; 18	MAR; 20	THO; 23	SEE; 25	RIV; 20	OXF; 10	SEE; 19	CLM; 16	WMM; 17	MON; 17	THO; 18	NHA; 20	STA; 23	OSW; 14	RIV; 19	THO; 21			14th	404	

=== SMART Modified Tour ===
SMART Modified Tour results
Year	Car owner	No.	Make	1	2	3	4	5	6	7	8	9	10	11	12	13	14	SMTC	Pts	Ref
2024	Eighty-Two Autosport	82	N/A	FLO	CRW	SBO	TRI; DNS	ROU	HCY	FCS	CRW							25th	101	
2024	Eighty-Two Autosport	8	N/A									JAC; 19	CAR; DNS	CRW			NWS; 29	25th	101	
2024	Eighty-Two Autosport	8S	N/A												DOM; 15	SBO		25th	101	
2025	Eighty-Two Autosport	8	N/A	FLO; 11	AND	SBO	ROU; 20	HCY	FCS	CRW	CPS	CAR	CRW	DOM	FCS	TRI	NWS	37th	51	
2026	Eighty-Two Autosport	8	N/A	FLO; 20	AND; 18	SBO	DOM	HCY	WKS	FCR	CRW; 14	PUL	CAR	ROU	TRI	NWS		31st	71	
