= 2025 NASCAR Whelen Modified Tour =

American motorsport season

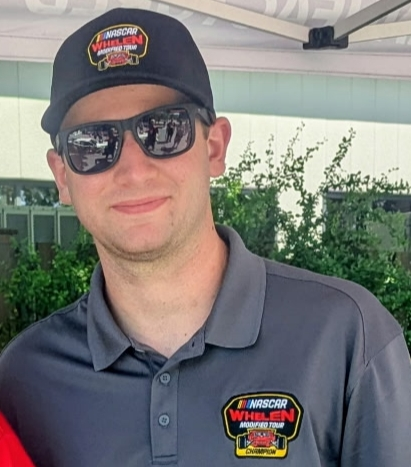
Austin Beers, the 2025 NASCAR Whelen Modified Tour champion.

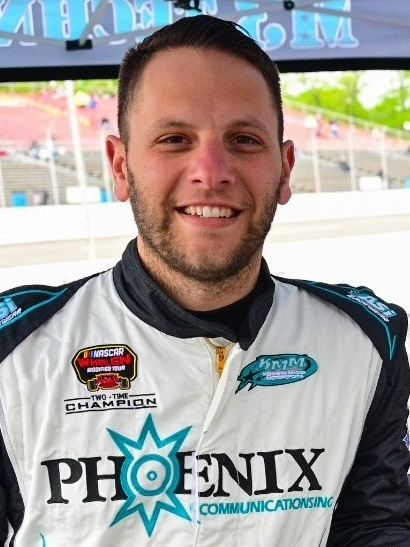
Justin Bonsignore, the defending series champion, finished second behind Beers in the championship by eight points.

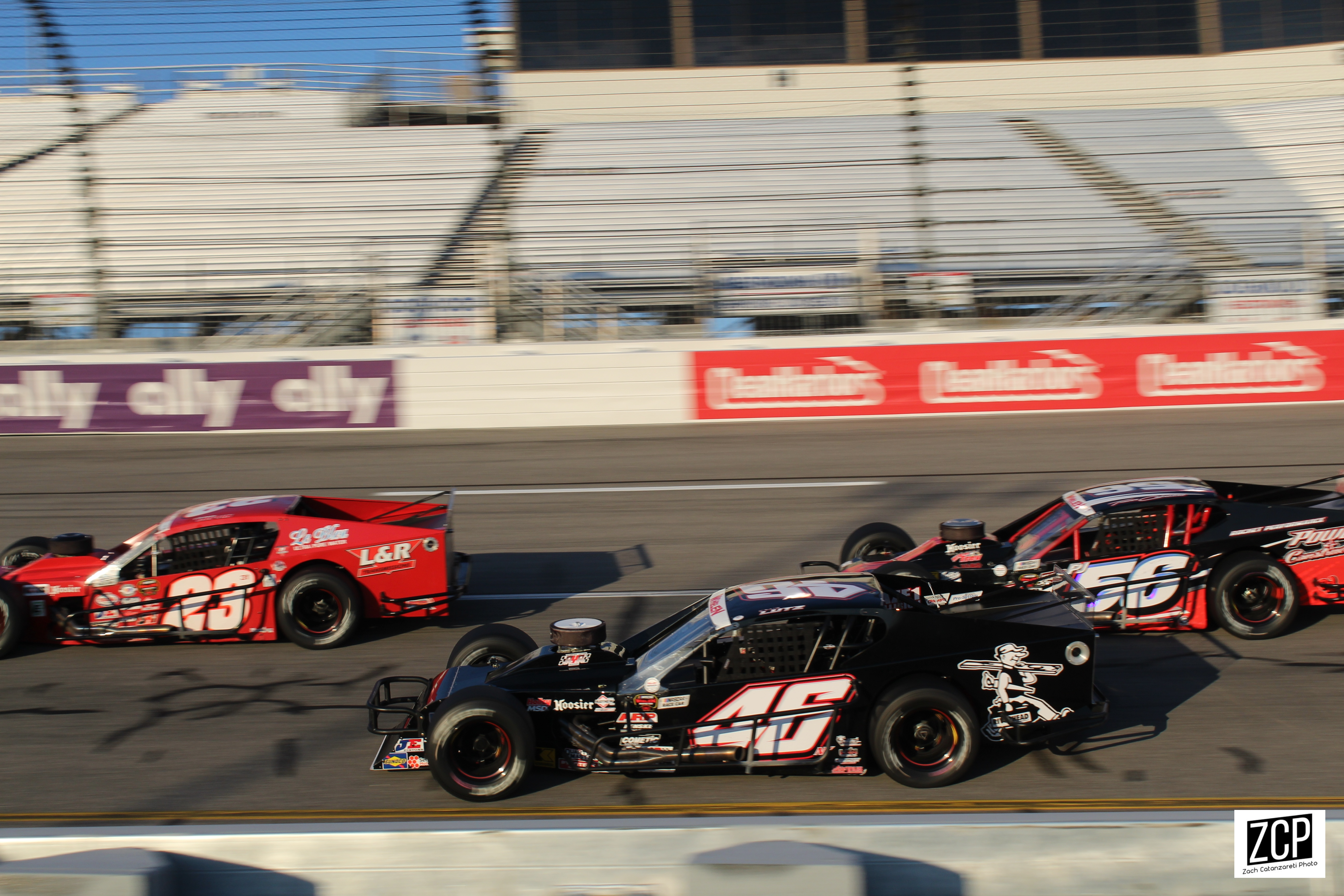
Craig Lutz (car No. 46) finished third in the championship by 37 points.

The 2025 NASCAR Whelen Modified Tour was the 41st season of the NASCAR Whelen Modified Tour, a stock car racing series sanctioned by NASCAR. It began with the New Smyrna Beach Area Visitors Bureau 200 at New Smyrna Speedway on February 8 and ended with the Virginia is for Racing Lovers 200 at Martinsville Speedway on October 23.

Justin Bonsignore entered the season as the defending series champion. Austin Beers won his first series title after finishing second the season finale at Martinsville.

== Schedule ==
No.	Race title	Track	Date
1	New Smyrna Beach Area Visitors Bureau 200	New Smyrna Speedway, New Smyrna Beach, Florida	February 8
2	Icebreaker 150	Thompson Speedway, Thompson, Connecticut	April 16 (Note: Thompson Speedway postponed the race from its March 30 date to April 5 due to "forecasted rain and cold temperatures." It was then postponed to April 16 due to similar conditions.)
3	FaithFest Evangelistic Ministries 150	North Wilkesboro Speedway, North Wilkesboro, North Carolina	May 18
4	J&R Precast 150	Seekonk Speedway, Seekonk, Massachusetts	June 1 (Note: Seekonk Speedway postponed the race from its May 31 date to June 1 due to "forecasted inclement weather.")
5	Miller Lite Salutes Steve Park 200	Riverhead Raceway, Riverhead, New York	June 15 (Note: Riverhead Raceway postponed the race from its June 14 date to June 15 due to "forecasted inclement weather".)
6	Thunder in the Mountains 200	White Mountain Motorsports Park, North Woodstock, New Hampshire	June 29 (Note: White Mountain Motorsports Park postponed the race from its June 28 date to June 29 due to "forecasted inclement weather".)
7	Nu-Way Auto Parts 150	Lancaster Motorplex, Lancaster, New York	July 12
8	Duel at the Dog 200 presented by USNE Power	Monadnock Speedway, Winchester, New Hampshire	July 19
9	Cheshire County Clash 200	Monadnock Speedway, Winchester, New Hampshire	July 20 (Note: NASCAR, JDV Productions and Monadnock Speedway postponed the race from its May 3 date due to inclement weather. It was eventually rescheduled to July 20.)
10	Thompson 150 presented by FloSports.com	Thompson Speedway, Thompson, Connecticut	August 6
11	Virginia is for Racing Lovers 150	Richmond Raceway, Richmond, Virginia	August 14
12	Toyota Mod Classic 150	Oswego Speedway, Oswego, New York	August 30
13	Mohegan Sun 100	New Hampshire Motor Speedway, Loudon, New Hampshire	September 20
14	Eddie Partridge 256	Riverhead Raceway, Riverhead, New York	October 4 (Note: NASCAR and Riverhead Raceway postponed the race from its September 6 date to October 4 due to inclement weather.)
15	World Series 150	Thompson Speedway, Thompson, Connecticut	October 12
16	Virginia is for Racing Lovers 200	Martinsville Speedway, Martinsville, Virginia	October 23

=== Schedule changes ===
- The race at Richmond moves from March to August after the track went down to having one Cup Series race weekend instead of two with the spring race being removed and the summer race being kept.
- The race at North Wilkesboro, which was held in October in 2024, moves to May on the afternoon of the Cup Series' All-Star Race at the track.
- The first race at Riverhead was moved from May to June.
- The race at New Hampshire moves from June to September along with the track's Cup Series race date.
- The race at Lancaster Motorplex was moved from August to July.
- The third race at Monadnock in September was removed and replaced by a race at White Mountain Motorsports Park in June.
- The race at Martinsville, which was scheduled to be held on October 18 was moved to October 23 as the same weekend as the Cup Series' weekend race at the track.

== Results and standings ==
=== Race results ===
No.	Race	Pole position	Most laps led	Winning driver
1	New Smyrna Beach Visitors Bureau 200	Luke Baldwin	Luke Baldwin	Patrick Emerling
2	Icebreaker 150	Jon McKennedy	Ron Silk	Ron Silk
3	FaithFest Evangelistic Ministries 150	Luke Baldwin	Craig Lutz	Craig Lutz
4	J&R Precast 150	Matt Hirschman	Matt Hirschman	Matt Hirschman
5	Miller Lite Salutes Steve Park 200	Justin Bonsignore	Justin Bonsignore	Justin Bonsignore
6	Thunder in the Mountains 200	Jake Johnson	Kyle Bonsignore	Kyle Bonsignore
7	Nu-Way Auto Parts 150	Matt Hirschman	Matt Hirschman	Austin Beers
8	Duel at the Dog 200 presented by USNE Power	Patrick Emerling	Patrick Emerling	Tommy Catalano
9	Cheshire County Clash 200	Austin Beers	Ron Silk	Ron Silk
10	Thompson 150 presented by FloSports.com	Ron Silk	Ron Silk	Patrick Emerling
11	Virginia is for Racing Lovers 150	Justin Bonsignore	Austin Beers	Craig Lutz
12	Toyota Mod Classic 150	Matt Hirschman	Matt Hirschman	Ron Silk
13	Mohegan Sun 100	Justin Bonsignore	Justin Bonsignore	Tyler Rypkema
14	Eddie Partridge 256	Matt Brode	Austin Beers	Austin Beers
15	World Series 150	Justin Bonsignore	Ron Silk	Ron Silk
16	Virginia is for Racing Lovers 200	Justin Bonsignore	Justin Bonsignore	Justin Bonsignore

=== Drivers' championship ===
(key) Bold – Pole position awarded by time. Italics – Pole position set by final practice results or rainout. * – Most laps led. ** – All laps led.

Pos	Driver	NSM	THO	NWS	SEE	RIV	WMM	LMP	MON	MON	THO	RCH	OSW	NHA	RIV	THO	MAR	Points
1	Austin Beers	5	4	5	3	8	5	1	5	**9**	7	2*	4	9	1*	3	2	649
2	Justin Bonsignore	3	5	3	11	**1***	10	8	4	2	8	**7**	10	**2***	3	**6**	**1***	641
3	Craig Lutz	2	13	1*	13	5	6	9	9	12	12	1	2	3	4	5	5	612
4	Matt Hirschman	15	11	22	**1***	2	4	**3***	17	3	2	6	**5***	5	15	4	9	597
5	Patrick Emerling	1	2	28	14	3	16	2	**2***	8	1	3	3	17	13	8	17	584
6	Stephen Kopcik	6	7	6	2	15	2	16	8	19	11	10	7	19	7	10	3	557
7	Kyle Bonsignore	27	12	24	6	6	1*	4	3	11	3	14	8	20	5	7	16	546
8	Trevor Catalano	13	3	15	5	12	8	13	13	5	14	4	9	21	8	13	15	536
9	Tyler Rypkema	11	15	19	21	9	11	6	6	21	13	13	11	1	11	9	6	526
10	Tommy Catalano	14	9	7	23	7	20	11	1	10	17	22	16	22	10	17	20	484
11	Ron Silk	9	1*			4	13		15	1*	**9***		1	24	2	1*		429
12	Ken Heagy	19	23	11	20	18	14	18	23	23	21	12	14	13	12	18	19	427
13	Luke Baldwin	**4***	14	**2**	12	10	7	7	7	7	25	17					21	402
14	Eric Goodale	7	25	31	10	14	Wth				5	9		8	6	23	7	339
15	Tyler Barry	22	16	18	7	19	15	17	20	16	20	20						294
16	Mike Marshall	21	28	17			18		22	17	22	15		15	16	21	23	293
17	John-Michael Shenette		Wth	16	22	20		19	25	22		23		14		19	12	248
18	Jacob Lutz	31	Wth	4				5			10		6	26			25	201
19	Chase Dowling	29	6		8						16			12		12		181
20	Max Zachem	16	22	Wth	16				16	20	15					25		178
21	Anthony Nocella		Wth				17		10	4				7		11		171
22	Jon McKennedy		**8**		15		9			Wth	23			10				159
23	Brian Robie	12			18		12		14	13								151
24	Ryan Newman	8		13				15	Wth	Wth		16					24	146
25	Jake Johnson		26		4		**3**				4							143
26	Joey Cipriano III			23	19		Wth		11	6				25		Wth		136
27	Teddy Hodgdon		27	12							18					15	18	130
28	Mike Christopher Jr.							14					12	16			10	124
29	Andrew Krause	10	18								19	24				26	Wth	123
30	Brian Sones	30	24	26					Wth	Wth	24		15			24		121
31	Dave Sapienza	20	Wth	30	17		Wth		19	14								120
32	Woody Pitkat		19				19			Wth				6		14		118
33	Matt Swanson		10								6					2		114
34	Gary McDonald	24	Wth			21		20	24	Wth					17			114
35	Kyle Ebersole			25	9				18	15								109
36	Andy Seuss											18		4			13	97
37	Dylan Slepian		29			11					26					20		90
38	Tyler Catalano	18						12					17					85
39	Sam Rameau								12	18				18				85
40	Jeremy Gerstner	26		9													14	83
41	Roger Turbush		20			13									18			81
42	Mark Stewart	17	17			Wth					Wth				19			79
43	Conner Jones			32								19					8	73
44	Corey LaJoie			14								5						70
45	Eric Berndt		21								27					16		68
46	Danny Bohn											11					11	67
47	Matt Brode					16									**9**			65
48	Joey Coulter			20													4	64
49	Carson Loftin			27								21					26	58
50	Luke Fleming			10													22	56
51	Matt Kimball								26	Wth				11				51
52	Norman Newman	23															27	38
53	Ryan Preece											8						37
54	Joey Braun			8														36
55	George Skora III							10										34
56	Andy Lewis Jr.												13					31
57	Bobby Labonte			29													28	31
58	Chris Rogers														14			30
59	Chris Young Jr.					18												26
60	Jake Crum			21													Wth	23
61	Nathan Wenzel								21	Wth								23
62	Timmy Solomito															22		22
63	Gary Putnam													23				21
64	Chris Hatton Jr.	25																19
65	Doug Coby													27				17
66	Frank Fleming	28																16
	Tommy Wanick				Wth													

== See also ==
- 2025 NASCAR Cup Series
- 2025 NASCAR Xfinity Series
- 2025 NASCAR Craftsman Truck Series
- 2025 ARCA Menards Series
- 2025 ARCA Menards Series East
- 2025 ARCA Menards Series West
- 2025 NASCAR Canada Series
- 2025 NASCAR Mexico Series
- 2025 NASCAR Euro Series
- 2025 NASCAR Brasil Series
- 2025 CARS Tour
- 2025 SMART Modified Tour
