= Mike Marshall (racing driver) =

American racing driver (born 1979)

- Nationality: American
- Born: December 22, 1979 (age 46) Hudson, New Hampshire, U.S.

NASCAR Whelen Modified Tour career
- Debut season: 2024
- Current team: Taylor Charbonnier
- Years active: 2024–present
- Car number: 29
- Crew chief: Doug Tisdell
- Starts: 16
- Championships: 0
- Wins: 0
- Poles: 0
- Best finish: 16th in 2025
- Finished last season: 59th (2026)
- Statistics up to date as of October 12, 2026.

Mike Marshall (born December 22, 1979) is an American professional stock car racing driver who currently competes part-time in the NASCAR Whelen Modified Tour, driving the No. 29 for Taylor Charbonnier.

Marshall has also previously competed in the NHSTRA Modified Battle for the Cup and the NASCAR Weekly Series, and is a frequent competitor at his home track of Hudson Speedway.

== Motorsports results ==
=== NASCAR ===
(key) (Bold – Pole position awarded by qualifying time. Italics – Pole position earned by points standings or practice time. * – Most laps led.)

==== Whelen Modified Tour ====
NASCAR Whelen Modified Tour results
Year	Car owner	No.	Make	1	2	3	4	5	6	7	8	9	10	11	12	13	14	15	16	NWMTC	Pts	Ref
2024	Taylor Charbonnier	29	Chevy	NSM	RCH	THO; 15	MON	RIV	SEE	NHA; 30	MON	LMP	THO	OSW	RIV	MON	THO; 21	NWS	MAR	47th	56	
2025	Taylor Charbonnier	29	Chevy	NSM; 21	THO; 28	NWS; 17	SEE	RIV	WMM; 18	LMP	MON; 22	MON; 17	THO; 22	RCH; 15	OSW	NHA; 15	RIV; 16	THO; 21	MAR; 23	16th	293	
2026	Taylor Charbonnier	29	Chevy	NSM; 30	MAR	THO	SEE	RIV	OXF	SEE	CLM	WMM	MON	THO	NHA	STA	OSW	RIV	THO	59th	14	
