= Tim Connolly (racing driver) =

American racing driver (born 1961)

- Born: January 15, 1961 (age 65); Endicott, New York, U.S.

NASCAR O'Reilly Auto Parts Series career
- 1 race run over 1 year
- Best finish: 80th (2012)
- First race: 2012 Zippo 200 at The Glen (Watkins Glen)
Wins	Top tens	Poles
0	0	0
- Statistics up to date as of July 29, 2024.

Tim Connolly (born January 15, 1961) is an American professional stock car racing driver who currently competes part-time in the NASCAR Whelen Modified Tour, driving the No. 4 for his own team.

In 2012, Connolly made his NASCAR Nationwide Series debut at Watkins Glen International, driving the No. 24 Chevrolet for SR² Motorsports, where he started 39th and finished one lap down in 25th.

Connolly has also competed in the SMART Modified Tour, the Race of Champions Asphalt Modified Tour, and the World Series of Asphalt Stock Car Racing.

== Motorsports results ==
=== NASCAR ===
(key) (Bold – Pole position awarded by qualifying time. Italics – Pole position earned by points standings or practice time. * – Most laps led.)

==== Nationwide Series ====
NASCAR Nationwide Series results
Year	Team	No.	Make	1	2	3	4	5	6	7	8	9	10	11	12	13	14	15	16	17	18	19	20	21	22	23	24	25	26	27	28	29	30	31	32	33	NNSC	Pts	Ref
2012	SR² Motorsports	24	Chevy	DAY	PHO	LVS	BRI	CAL	TEX	RCH	TAL	DAR	IOW	CLT	DOV	MCH	ROA	KEN	DAY	NHA	CHI	IND	IOW	GLN; 25	CGV	BRI	ATL	RCH	CHI	KEN	DOV	CLT	KAN	TEX	PHO	HOM	80th	19	

==== Whelen Modified Tour ====
NASCAR Whelen Modified Tour results
Year	Team	No.	Make	1	2	3	4	5	6	7	8	9	10	11	12	13	14	15	16	17	18	19	20	21	22	23	24	25	26	NWMTC	Pts	Ref
1988	Lew Parks	42	Chevy	ROU; DNQ	MAR; DNQ	TMP; 19	MAR; DNQ	JEN	IRP; 31	MND	OSW; 21	OSW; DNQ	RIV	JEN	RPS	TMP	RIV	OSW	TMP	OXF	OSW; 34	TMP	POC; 18	TIO; 19	TMP	ROU	MAR			45th	395	
1989	Lew Parks	42	Chevy	MAR	TMP	MAR	JEN	STA	IRP	OSW	WFD	MND	RIV	OSW	JEN	STA	RPS	RIV	OSW	TMP	TMP	RPS	OSW	TMP	POC; 14	STA	TIO; 15	MAR	TMP	N/A	0	
1990	Tim Connolly	42	Chevy	MAR	RCH	TMP	STA	MAR	STA	TMP	MND	HOL	STA	RIV	JEN	EPP	RPS	RIV	TMP	RPS	NHA	TMP	POC; 17	STA	TMP	MAR				N/A	0	
1991	Lew Parks	47	Chevy	MAR	RCH	TMP	NHA	MAR	NZH	STA	TMP	FLE	OXF	RIV	JEN	STA	RPS	RIV	RCH	TMP	NHA	TMP	POC; 36	STA	TMP	MAR				N/A	0	
1992	Lew Parks	42	Chevy	MAR	TMP; 7	RCH; 25	STA	MAR; 32	NHA; 28	NZH; 16	STA; 21	TMP	FLE	RIV	NHA	STA; 23	RPS; 14	RIV	TMP; 13	TMP; 31	NHA; 20	STA	MAR; 26	TMP; 18						24th	1514	
1993	Lew Parks	42	Chevy	RCH; 24	STA; 5	TMP; 15	NHA; 30	NZH; 1	STA; 7	RIV; 15	NHA; 9	RPS; 8	HOL; 16	LEE; 7	RIV; 12	STA; 16	TMP; 19	TMP; 29	STA; 11	TMP; 28										12th	2055	
1994	Lew Parks	42	Chevy	NHA; 11	STA; 24	TMP; 19	NZH; 14	STA; 12	LEE; 27	TMP; 17	RIV; 25	TIO; 10	NHA; 32	RPS	HOL; 22	TMP; 13	RIV; 22	NHA; 20	STA; 17	SPE; 10	TMP; 26	NHA; 20								17th	2272	
1994	N/A	94	Chevy																				STA; 9	TMP; 4						17th	2272	
1995	N/A	17	Chevy	TMP; 29	NHA; 18	STA; 27	NZH; 2	STA; 10	**LEE**; 1	TMP; 5	RIV; 3	BEE; 18	NHA; 3	**JEN**; 7	RPS; 23	HOL; 8	RIV; 22	NHA; 25	STA; 28	TMP; 8	NHA; 34	STA; 15	TMP; 9	TMP; 22						11th	2547	
1996	Robert Garbarino	4	Dodge	TMP; 13	STA; 14	NZH; 34	STA; 10	NHA; 6	JEN; 5	**RIV**; 8	LEE; 3	RPS; 5	HOL; 15	TMP; 4	RIV; 2	NHA; 12	GLN; 23	STA; 18	NHA; 3	NHA; 3	STA; 2	FLE; 24	TMP; 25							6th	2664	
1997	Robert Garbarino	4	Dodge	TMP; 12	MAR; 6	STA; 14	NZH; 23	**STA**; 10	NHA; 4	**FLE**; 3	**JEN**; 26	RIV; 4	**GLN**; 1*	NHA; 1*	**RPS**; 23	**HOL**; 1*	TMP; 5	RIV; 4	NHA; 6	GLN; 6	STA; 3	**NHA**; 7	STA; 1	**FLE**; 29	**TMP**; 3	RCH; 11				2nd	3307	
1998	Robert Garbarino	4	Dodge	RPS; 14	TMP; 23	MAR; 3	STA; 2	**NZH**; 28	STA; 7	GLN; 1	**JEN**; 4	RIV; 8	NHA; 6	NHA; 40	LEE; 3	**HOL**; 3	TMP; 2	**NHA**; 24	RIV; 9	**STA**; 26	NHA; 16	**TMP**; 21	STA; 8	TMP; 5	FLE; 7					5th	2922	
1999	Robert Garbarino	4	Dodge	TMP; 10	RPS; 9	STA; 7	RCH; 36	STA; 1	RIV; 2	JEN; 2	**NHA**; 27	NZH; 18	HOL; 8	TMP; 1*	NHA; 10	RIV; 4	GLN; 3	STA; 31	RPS; 7	TMP; 12	NHA; 8	STA; 3	MAR; 7	TMP; 2						3rd	2931	
2000	Robert Garbarino	4	Dodge	STA; 5	RCH; 14	STA; 2	RIV; 3	SEE; 4	NHA; 3	NZH; 7	**TMP**; 10	RIV; 6	GLN; 18	TMP; 10	STA; 6	WFD; 14	NHA; 20	STA; 7	MAR; 17	TMP; 25										4th	2329	
2002	PBM Motorsports	6	Chevy	TMP	STA; 15	WFD	NZH	RIV	SEE		STA; 7	BEE	NHA	RIV	TMP	STA	WFD	TMP	NHA	STA	MAR	TMP								56th	307	
2002	PBM Motorsports	46	Pontiac							RCH; 40																				56th	307	
2023	Tim Connolly	4	Chevy	NSM	RCH; 25	MON; 24	RIV	LEE	SEE	RIV	WAL	NHA; 22	LMP; 18	THO	LGY; 11	OSW; 14	MON	RIV	NWS; 36	THO	MAR; 22									27th	180	
2024	Tim Connolly	4	Chevy	NSM; 19	RCH; 22	THO; 20	MON; 16	RIV; 18	SEE; 20	NHA; 13	MON; 21	LMP; 11	THO; 14	OSW; 12	RIV; 18	MON; Wth	THO; 14	NWS; 14	MAR; 22											12th	408	
2026	Tim Connolly	4	Chevy	NSM	MAR	THO	SEE	RIV	OXF	SEE	CLM	WMM	MON	THO	NHA	STA	OSW; 16	RIV	THO											53rd	28	

=== SMART Modified Tour ===
SMART Modified Tour results
Year	Car owner	No.	Make	1	2	3	4	5	6	7	8	9	10	11	12	13	14	SMTC	Pts	Ref
2022	Tim Connolly	V4	N/A	FLO	SNM	CRW	SBO	FCS	CRW	NWS; 24	NWS; 14	CAR	DOM	HCY	TRI	PUL		N/A	0	
2023	Tim Connolly	V4	N/A	FLO	CRW	SBO	HCY	FCS	CRW	ACE	CAR	PUL; 22	TRI	SBO	ROU			52nd	19	
2024	Tim Connolly	V4	N/A	FLO	CRW	SBO	TRI	ROU	HCY	FCS	CRW	JAC	CAR	CRW	DOM	SBO	NWS; 26	61st	15	
