= 2024 NASCAR Whelen Modified Tour =

40th season of the NASCAR Whelen Modified Tour

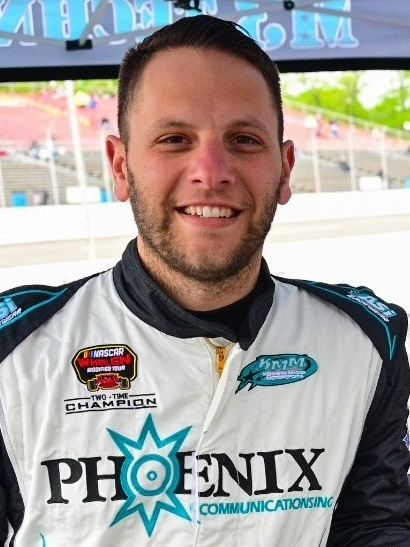
Justin Bonsignore, the 2024 Whelen Modified Tour champion.

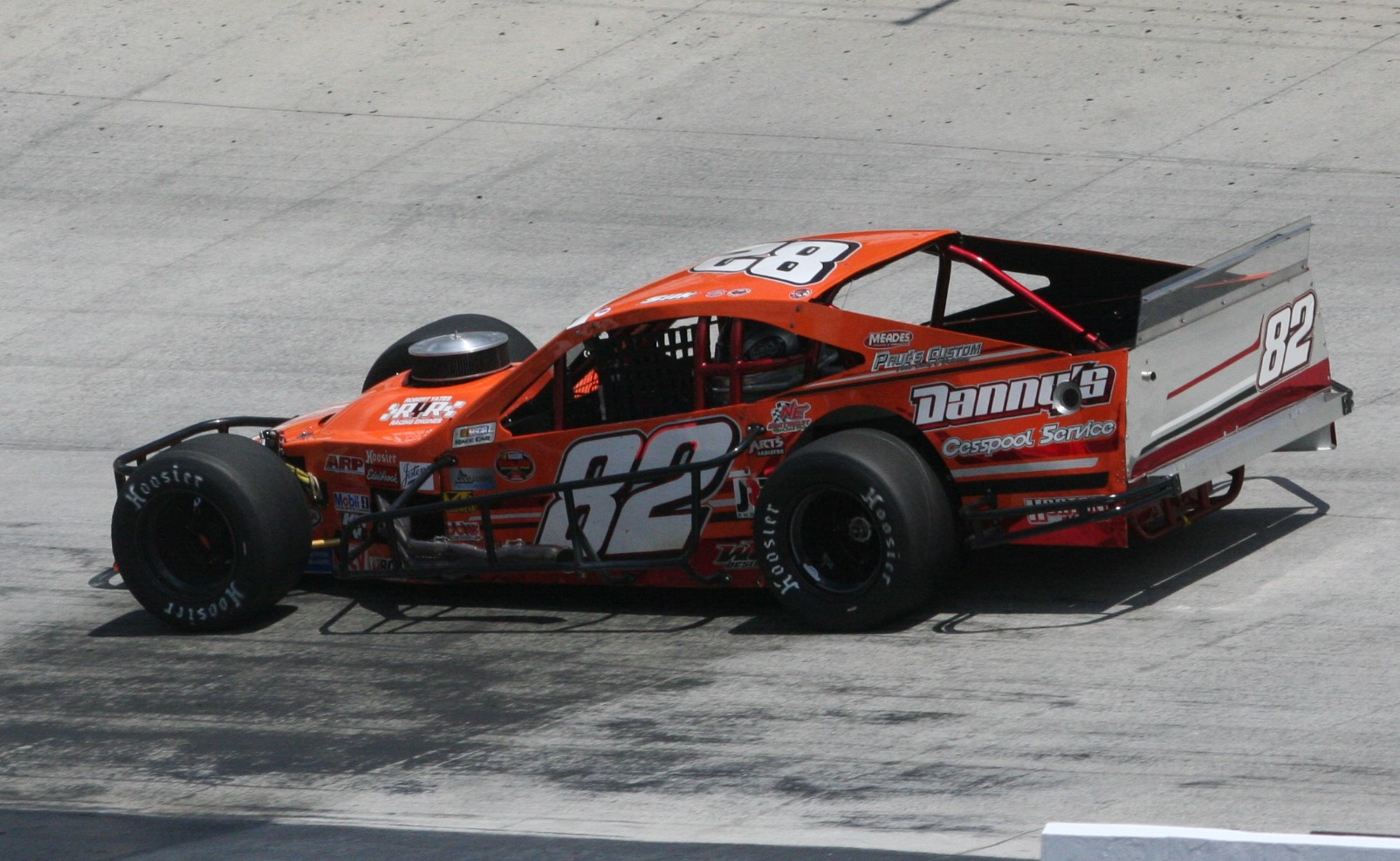
Ron Silk, the defending series champion, finished second behind Bonsignore in the championship by 30 points.

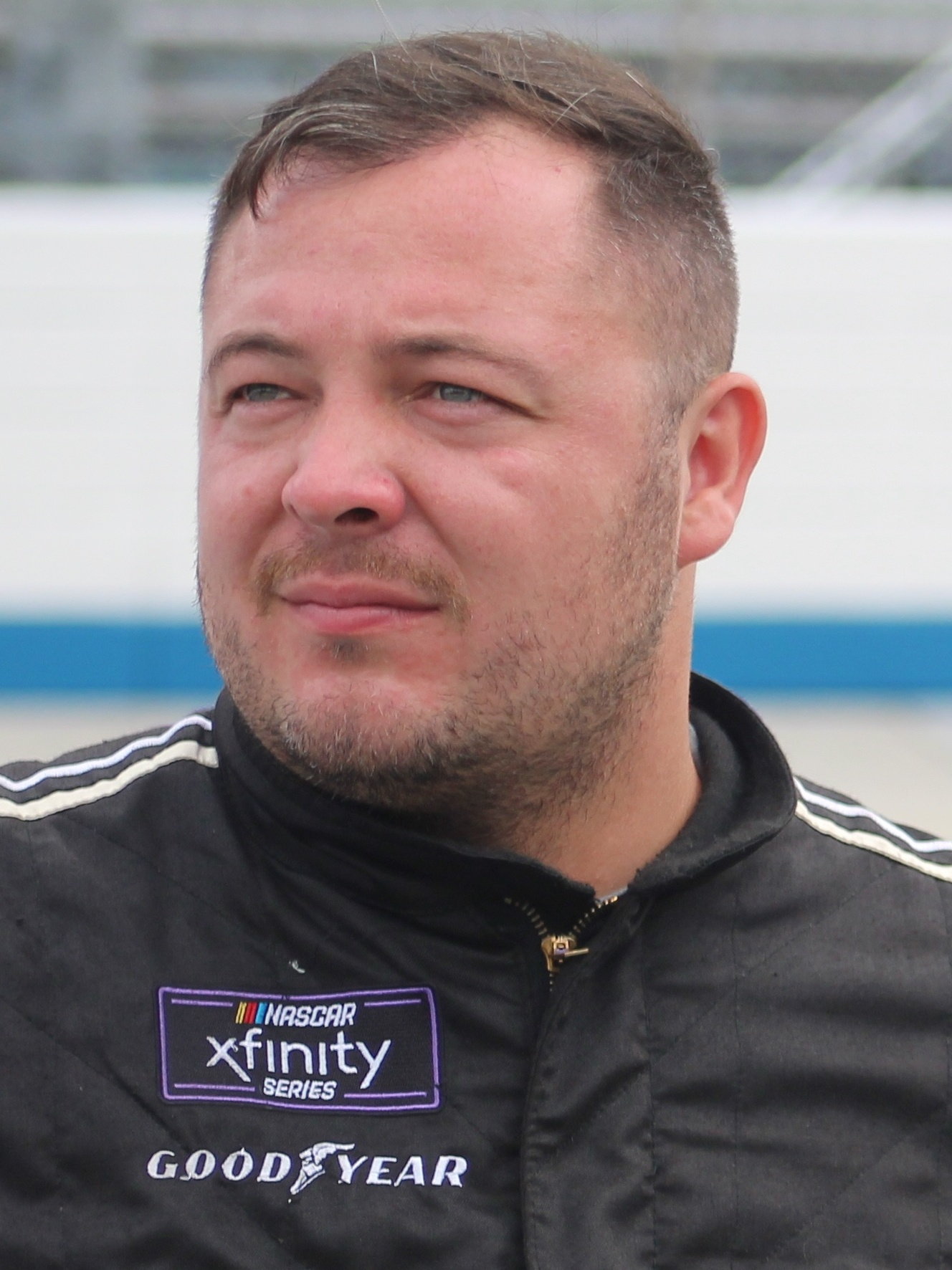
Patrick Emerling finished third behind Bonsignore in the championship by 37 points.

The 2024 NASCAR Whelen Modified Tour was the fortieth season of the NASCAR Whelen Modified Tour, a stock car racing tour sanctioned by NASCAR. It began with the New Smyrna Beach Visitors Bureau 200 at New Smyrna Speedway on February 10 and ended with the Virginia is for Racing Lovers 300 at Martinsville Speedway on October 26.

Ron Silk entered the season as the defending series champion. Justin Bonsignore won his fourth series title after winning the season finale at Martinsville.

== Schedule ==
No.	Race title	Track	Date
1	New Smyrna Beach Visitors Bureau 200	New Smyrna Speedway, New Smyrna Beach, Florida	February 10
2	Virginia is for Racing Lovers 150	Richmond Raceway, Richmond, Virginia	March 29
3	Icebreaker 150	Thompson Speedway, Thompson, Connecticut	April 7
4	Granite State Derby 175	Monadnock Speedway, Winchester, New Hampshire	May 4
5	Miller Lite Salutes Wayne Anderson 200	Riverhead Raceway, Riverhead, New York	May 19
6	J&R Precast 150	Seekonk Speedway, Seekonk, Massachusetts	June 1
7	Mohegan Sun 100	New Hampshire Motor Speedway, Loudon, New Hampshire	June 22
8	Duel at the Dog 250	Monadnock Speedway, Winchester, New Hampshire	July 20
9	Nu-Way Auto Parts 150	Lancaster Motorplex, Lancaster, New York	August 3
10	Thompson 150 presented by FloSports.com	Thompson Speedway, Thompson, Connecticut	August 14
11	Toyota Mod Classic 150	Oswego Speedway, Oswego, New York	August 31
12	Eddie Partridge 256	Riverhead Raceway, Riverhead, New York	September 14
13	Winchester Fair 200 presented by USNE	Monadnock Speedway, Winchester, New Hampshire	September 21
14	World Series 150	Thompson Speedway, Thompson, Connecticut	October 13
15	Brushy Mountain Powersports 150	North Wilkesboro Speedway, North Wilkesboro, North Carolina	October 20 (Note: North Wilkesboro Speedway postponed the race from its October 5 date to October 20 because of Hurricane Helene cleanup. The circuit was being used as a staging area for recovery crews.)
16	Virginia is for Racing Lovers 300	Martinsville Speedway, Martinsville, Virginia	October 26

== Results and standings ==
=== Race results ===
No.	Race	Pole position	Most laps led	Winning driver
1	New Smyrna Beach Visitors Bureau 200	Craig Lutz	Ron Silk	Ron Silk
2	Virginia is for Racing Lovers 150	Ron Silk	Justin Bonsignore	Justin Bonsignore
3	Icebreaker 150	Justin Bonsignore	Ron Silk	Ron Silk
4	Granite State Derby	Matt Hirschman	Ron Silk	Jake Johnson
5	Miller Lite Salutes Wayne Anderson 200	Trevor Catalano	Ron Silk	Ron Silk
6	J&R Precast 150	Matt Hirschman	Austin Beers	Matt Hirschman
7	Mohegan Sun 100	Ron Silk	Justin Bonsignore	Justin Bonsignore
8	Duel at the Dog 250	Austin Beers	Craig Lutz	Trevor Catalano
9	Nu-Way Auto Parts 150	Ron Silk	Austin Beers	Austin Beers
10	Thompson 150 presented by FloSports.com	Patrick Emerling	Patrick Emerling	Patrick Emerling
11	Toyota Mod Classic 150	Matt Hirschman	Matt Hirschman	Patrick Emerling
12	Eddie Partridge 256	Justin Bonsignore	Justin Bonsignore	Ron Silk
13	Winchester Fair presented by USNE	Austin Beers	Matt Hirschman	Patrick Emerling
14	World Series 150	Ron Silk (Note: Qualifying was cancelled due to the threat of rain and the lineup was set by owners points.)	Justin Bonsignore	Justin Bonsignore
15	Brushy Mountain Powersports 150	Austin Beers	Justin Bonsignore	Justin Bonsignore
16	Virginia is for Racing Lovers 300	Justin Bonsignore	Justin Bonsignore	Justin Bonsignore

=== Drivers' championship ===
(key) Bold – Pole position awarded by time. Italics – Pole position set by final practice results or rainout. * – Most laps led. ** – All laps led.

Pos	Driver	NSM	RCH	THO	MON	RIV	SEE	NHA	MON	LMP	THO	OSW	RIV	MON	THO	NWS	MAR	Points
1	Justin Bonsignore	2	1*	**4**	6	3	5	1*	7	3	2	3	**15***	8	1*	1*	**1***	672
2	Ron Silk	1*	**2**	1*	10*	1*	3	10	2	10	7	4	1	7	3	11	17	642
3	Patrick Emerling	4	24	3	3	9	8	4	3	2	**1****	1	4	1	7	4	10	635
4	Austin Beers	6	26	7	2	2	2*	9	**10**	1*	8	5	5	**10**	4	**3**	4	611
5	Craig Lutz	**12**	7	6	4	7	19	22	12*	6	3	9	2	4	8	12	6	575
6	Kyle Bonsignore	11	8	8	22	13	7	2	5	16	24	8	7	15	10	10	11	530
7	Matt Hirschman	10		9	**5**		**1**		4	4	22	**2***		3*	5	2	2	485
8	Trevor Catalano	5	3	19	17	24	12	12	1	13	9	14	13	12	18		18	475
9	Tommy Catalano	30	10	13	12	22	13	6	9	5	5	7	10	9	15		23	472
10	Tyler Rypkema	7	17	5	21	26		11		17	12	10	3	13	13	5	16	440
11	Ken Heagy	20	18	14	18	17	22	19	18	12	20	16	14	18	19	17	19	423
12	Tim Connolly	19	22	20	16	18	20	13	21	11	14	12	18	Wth	14	14	22	408
13	Tyler Catalano	27	15	17	14	14	21	18	15	19	19	18	12	19	17		20	395
14	Jake Johnson	9	5	2	1	6	9	8	14	9	26							355
15	Melissa Fifield	25	20	16	20	29	23	29	19	15	27	20	19			18		292
16	Anthony Sesely	28	12	11	13	23	16		Wth		13			17				220
17	Andrew Krause	8	13	22							11	17				20	9	209
18	Doug Coby	3	6			15	14	28			16							184
19	Jacob Lutz						6	25		8		6					3	172
20	Woody Pitkat								6		15	11		5	12			171
21	Eric Goodale	26	21	24				7			10		9					169
22	Matt Swanson			10			10	16			6				11			167
23	Brian Robie	17	16	12	7				11									157
24	Anthony Nocella				9			14						2	2			149
25	Chase Dowling							3			25				6	6		136
26	Ryan Newman	14	11													13	5	133
27	Matt Kimball				15			15	8					6				132
28	Stephen Kopcik						4		13		23			11				125
29	Timmy Solomito				11	25	15						6					119
30	Carson Loftin	29	9													9	12	117
31	J. R. Bertuccio	32		18		5							8					113
32	Andy Jankowiak							27		7	17	15						110
33	Joey Cipriano III				8			31						14	16			107
34	Dave Sapienza	16		23							21				9			107
35	Jon McKennedy				23			23			4			21	Wth			105
36	Sam Rameau						11	5								16		100
37	Luke Baldwin							20								7	7	98
38	Bob Reis									18		19		20	22			97
39	Bobby Santos III		4	21								13						94
40	Bobby Labonte		23													8	8	93
41	Gary McDonald	22	19			20		24										91
42	Joey Coulter	18														15	15	84
43	Roger Turbush					16					18		17					81
44	Kyle Ebersole				19		17		16									80
45	Nathan Wenzel				24				17					16				75
46	Andy Seuss		25					21								Wth	14	72
47	Mike Marshall			15				30							21			66
48	J. B. Fortin	21				4												63
49	Mark Stewart					10							16					62
50	John-Michael Shenette	33						17	20									62
51	Jack Handley Jr.					19							11					58
52	Ryan Preece	13						26										49
53	Tom Rogers Jr.					21	18											49
54	Chris Hatton Jr.	31														19		38
55	John Beatty Jr.					8												36
56	Chris Young Jr.					11												33
57	Justin Brown					12												32
58	Jake Crum																13	31
59	Marcello Rufrano		14															30
60	Andrew Spurback									14								30
61	Ronnie Williams	15																29
62	Tyler Barry														20			24
63	Bryan Dauzat																21	23
64	Brett Meservey	23																21
65	Spencer Davis	24																20
66	Matt Brode					27												17
67	Allan Pederson					28												16
68	Eddie McCarthy	34																10
69	Jeremy Gerstner	35																9

== See also ==
- 2024 NASCAR Cup Series
- 2024 NASCAR Xfinity Series
- 2024 NASCAR Craftsman Truck Series
- 2024 ARCA Menards Series
- 2024 ARCA Menards Series East
- 2024 ARCA Menards Series West
- 2024 NASCAR Canada Series
- 2024 NASCAR Mexico Series
- 2024 NASCAR Whelen Euro Series
- 2024 NASCAR Brasil Sprint Race
- 2024 CARS Tour
- 2024 SMART Modified Tour
