= Teddy Hodgdon =

American racing driver (born 2001)

- Nationality: American
- Born: January 13, 2001 (age 25) Danbury, Connecticut, U.S.

NASCAR Whelen Modified Tour career
- Debut season: 2025
- Current team: Teddy Hodgdon Racing
- Years active: 2025–present
- Car number: 05
- Crew chief: Ted Hodgdon
- Starts: 21
- Championships: 0
- Wins: 2
- Poles: 0
- Best finish: 8th in 2026
- Finished last season: 8th (2026)
- Statistics up to date as of October 12, 2026.

Teddy Hodgdon IV (born January 13, 2001) is an American professional stock car racing driver who currently competes full-time in the NASCAR Whelen Modified Tour, driving the No. 05 for Teddy Hodgdon Racing, having previously made his debut in the series in 2025.

In 2026, Hodgdon got his first career win in the Whelen Modified Tour at Stafford Motor Speedway.

Hodgdon has also previously competed in the Monaco Modified Tri-Track Series, the Modified Racing Series, the World Series of Asphalt Stock Car Racing, and the NASCAR Weekly Series, and is a former SK Light Modified Tour champion at Stafford Motor Speedway.

== Motorsports results ==
=== NASCAR ===
(key) (Bold – Pole position awarded by qualifying time. Italics – Pole position earned by points standings or practice time. * – Most laps led.)

==== Whelen Modified Tour ====
NASCAR Whelen Modified Tour results
Year	Car owner	No.	Make	1	2	3	4	5	6	7	8	9	10	11	12	13	14	15	16	NWMTC	Pts	Ref
2025	Ted Hodgdon	55	Chevy	NSM	THO; 27								THO; 18	RCH	OSW	NHA	RIV	THO; 15		27th	130	
2025	Ted Hodgdon	05	Chevy			NWS; 12	SEE	RIV	WMM	LMP	MON	MON							MAR; 18	27th	130	
2026	Teddy Hodgdon Racing	05	Chevy	NSM; 11	MAR; 28	THO; 11	SEE; 7	RIV; 16	OXF; 9	SEE; 7	CLM; 7	WMM; 10	MON; 6	THO; 13	NHA; 9	STA; 1	OSW; 4	RIV; 21	THO; 1	8th	551	
