= Sam Rameau =

American racing driver

- Nationality: American
- Born: June 15, 2002 (age 24) Westminster, Massachusetts, U.S.

NASCAR Whelen Modified Tour career
- Debut season: 2018
- Current team: Jamie Tomaino
- Years active: 2018–present
- Car number: 99
- Crew chief: Charlie Barham
- Starts: 43
- Championships: 0
- Wins: 0
- Poles: 0
- Best finish: 12th in 2020
- Finished last season: 58th (2026)
- Statistics up to date as of October 12, 2026.

Samuel Rameau (born June 15, 2002) is an American professional stock car racing driver who competes part-time in the NASCAR Whelen Modified Tour, driving the No. 99 for Jamie Tomaino.

In October 2023, Rameau was indefinitely suspended from all NASCAR and Tri-Track Open Modified events after attacking another driver following a crash at Thompson Speedway, but was reinstated in May of the following year with a probation period through December 31, 2024.

Rameau has previously competed in series such as the Modified Racing Series, the Tri-Track Open Modified Series, and the Whitcomb 5 Series.

== Motorsports results ==
=== NASCAR ===
(key) (Bold – Pole position awarded by qualifying time. Italics – Pole position earned by points standings or practice time. * – Most laps led.)

==== Whelen Modified Tour ====
NASCAR Whelen Modified Tour results
Year	Car owner	No.	Make	1	2	3	4	5	6	7	8	9	10	11	12	13	14	15	16	17	18	NWMTC	Pts	Ref
2018	Randy Rameau	06	Chevy	MYR	TMP	STA	SEE	TMP	LGY	RIV	NHA	STA	TMP	BRI	OSW	RIV	NHA	STA	TMP; 17			54th	27	
2019	Randy Rameau	06	Chevy	MYR; 31	SBO; 15	TMP; 11	STA; 8	WAL; 22	SEE; 18	TMP; 8	RIV; 23	NHA; 13	STA; 9	TMP; 20	OSW; 15	RIV; 28	NHA; 18	STA; 32	TMP; 14			14th	419	
2020	Randy Rameau	06	Chevy	JEN; 11	WMM; 12	WMM; 21	JEN; 11	MND; 8	TMP; 23	NHA; 12	STA; 12	TMP; 6										12th	281	
2021	Randy Rameau	06	Chevy	MAR; 31	STA	RIV	JEN	OSW	RIV	NHA; 12	NRP	STA	BEE	OSW	RCH	RIV	STA					47th	45	
2022	Sam Rameau	06	Chevy	NSM	RCH	RIV	LEE; 12	JEN	MND; 4	RIV	WAL	NHA	CLM; 22	TMP	LGY	OSW	RIV	TMP	MAR			38th	94	
2023	Sam Rameau	06	Chevy	NSM	RCH	MON; 6	RIV	LEE; 4	SEE	RIV	WAL	NHA	LMP	THO	LGY	OSW	MON; 3	RIV	NWS; 17			29th	169	
2023	Randy Rameau	06	Chevy																	THO; 21	MAR	29th	169	
2024	Randy Rameau	06	Chevy	NSM	RCH	THO	MON	RIV	SEE; 11													36th	100	
2024	Sam Rameau	06	Chevy							NHA; 5	MON	LMP	THO	OSW	RIV	MON	THO	NWS; 16	MAR			36th	100	
2025	Randy Rameau	06	Chevy	NSM	THO	NWS	SEE	RIV	WMM	LMP	MON; 12	MON; 18	THO	RCH	OSW	NHA; 18	RIV	THO	MAR			39th	85	
2026	Jamie Tomaino	99	N/A	NSM; 29	MAR	THO	SEE	RIV	OXF	SEE	CLM	WMM	MON	THO	NHA	STA	OSW	RIV	THO			58th	15	

=== SMART Modified Tour ===
SMART Modified Tour results
Year	Car owner	No.	Make	1	2	3	4	5	6	7	8	9	10	11	12	13	14	SMTC	Pts	Ref
2023	Randy Rameau	06M	N/A	FLO	CRW	SBO	HCY	FCS	CRW	ACE	CAR	PUL; 1	TRI	SBO	ROU			37th	50	
2024	Randy Rameau	06M	N/A	FLO	CRW	SBO	TRI	ROU	HCY	FCS; 10	CRW	JAC	CAR	CRW				26th	99	
2024	Randy Rameau	06	N/A												DOM; 5	SBO		26th	99	
2024	Randy Rameau	6MA	N/A														NWS; 10	26th	99	
2025	Randy Rameau	06MA	N/A	FLO	AND	SBO; 17	ROU; 10	HCY	FCS	CRW	CPS	CAR	CRW	DOM; 10	FCS	TRI	NWS	26th	89	
