= Jack Baldwin (racing driver, born 2003) =

American racing driver (born 2003)

- Nationality: American
- Born: Jack Harris Baldwin; August 4, 2003 (age 23) Mooresville, North Carolina, U.S.

SMART Modified Tour career
- Debut season: 2024
- Current team: Tommy Baldwin Racing
- Years active: 2024–present
- Car number: 7NY
- Starts: 28
- Championships: 0
- Wins: 0
- Poles: 0
- Best finish: 6th in 2025
- Statistics up to date as of October 10, 2026.

Jack Harris Baldwin (born August 4, 2003) is an American professional stock car racing driver. He competes full-time in the SMART Modified Tour, driving the No. 7NY for Tommy Baldwin Racing. He is the son of former NASCAR Cup Series crew chief and owner of TBR, Tommy Baldwin Jr., and the grandson of the late Tom Baldwin, who competed in the NASCAR Whelen Modified Tour. His younger brother, Luke, also competes in modified racing as well as the NASCAR Craftsman Truck Series.

Baldwin has also competed in series such as the Carolina Crate Modified Series, the World Series of Asphalt Stock Car Racing, the INEX Summer Shootout Series, and the INEX Winter Heat Series.

== Motorsports results ==
=== NASCAR ===
(key) (Bold – Pole position awarded by qualifying time. Italics – Pole position earned by points standings or practice time. * – Most laps led.)

==== Whelen Modified Tour ====
NASCAR Whelen Modified Tour results
Year	Car owner	No.	Make	1	2	3	4	5	6	7	8	9	10	11	12	13	14	15	16	NWMTC	Pts	Ref
2026	PSR Racing	38	Chevy	NSM	MAR; 17	THO	SEE	RIV	OXF	SEE	CLM	WMM	MON	THO	NHA	STA	OSW	RIV	THO	54th	27	

=== CARS Pro Late Model Tour ===
(key)

CARS Pro Late Model Tour results
Year	Team	No.	Make	1	2	3	4	5	6	7	8	9	10	11	CPLMTC	Pts	Ref
2026	LRT Motorsports	11	Chevy	SNM	NSV	CRW; 22	ACE	NWS; 15		AND; 9	FLC; 13	TCM; 20	NPS; 8	SBO; 8	11th	227	
2026	LRT Motorsports	33	Chevy						HCY; 14						11th	227	

=== SMART Modified Tour ===
SMART Modified Tour results
Year	Car owner	No.	Make	1	2	3	4	5	6	7	8	9	10	11	12	13	14	SMTC	Pts	Ref
2024	Tommy Baldwin Racing	7NY	PSR	FLO	CRW	SBO	TRI	ROU	HCY	FCS	CRW	JAC; 5	CAR; 8	CRW	DOM	SBO	NWS	32nd	69	
2025	Tommy Baldwin Racing	7NY	PSR	FLO; 7	AND; 16	SBO; 16	ROU; 13	HCY; 15	FCS; 8	CRW; 9	CPS; 5	CAR; 2	CRW; 6	DOM; 4	FCS; 11	TRI; 10	NWS; 9	6th	444	
2026	Tommy Baldwin Racing	7NY	PSR	FLO; 2	AND; 11	SBO; 4	DOM; 3	HCY; 13	WKS; 15	FCR; 8	CRW; 27	PUL; 19	CAR; 9	ROU; 5	TRI; 10	NWS; Wth		9th	371	
