= Andrew Molleur =

American racing driver (born 2003)

- Nationality: American
- Born: March 15, 2003 (age 23) Shelton, Connecticut, U.S.

NASCAR Whelen Modified Tour career
- Debut season: 2018
- Current team: Danny Watts Racing
- Years active: 2018–2019, 2021, 2026–present
- Car number: 82
- Starts: 21
- Championships: 0
- Wins: 0
- Poles: 0
- Best finish: 11th in 2026
- Finished last season: 11th (2026)
- Statistics up to date as of October 12, 2026.

Andrew Molleur (born March 15, 2003) is an American professional stock car racing driver who currently competes full-time in the NASCAR Whelen Modified Tour, driving the No. 82 for Danny Watts Racing.

Molleur has also previously competed in series such as the ACT Late Model Tour, the Modified Racing Series, the Indoor Auto Racing Championship, the EXIT Realty Modified Touring Series, and the NASCAR Weekly Series, and is a regular competitor at Stafford Motor Speedway.

== Motorsports results ==
=== NASCAR ===
(key) (Bold – Pole position awarded by qualifying time. Italics – Pole position earned by points standings or practice time. * – Most laps led.)

==== Whelen Modified Tour ====
NASCAR Whelen Modified Tour results
Year	Car owner	No.	Make	1	2	3	4	5	6	7	8	9	10	11	12	13	14	15	16	NWMTC	Pts	Ref
2018	Mike Molleur	35	Ford	MYR	TMP	STA	SEE	TMP	LGY	RIV	NHA	STA	TMP	BRI	OSW	RIV	NHA	STA; 19	TMP	56th	25	
2019	Mike Molleur	35	Chevy	MYR	SBO	TMP	STA	WAL	SEE	TMP; Wth	RIV	NHA; 33	STA; DNQ							39th	98	
2019	Mike Molleur	35	Toyota											TMP; 18	OSW	RIV	NHA	STA; 18	TMP; 21	39th	98	
2021	Mike Molleur	35	Chevy	MAR	STA	RIV	JEN	OSW	RIV	NHA	NRP	STA	BEE	OSW	RCH	RIV	STA; 16			59th	28	
2026	Danny Watts Racing	82	Chevy	NSM	MAR; 13	THO; 17	SEE; 10	RIV; 14	OXF; 8	SEE; 8	CLM; 10	WMM; 9	MON; 14	THO; 14	NHA; 10	STA; 11	OSW; 11	RIV; 11	THO; 10	11th	491	
