= Tom Baldwin (racing driver) =

American racing driver (1947–2004)

"Tiger" Tom Baldwin
- Born: March 14, 1947 East Patchogue, New York, U.S.
- Died: August 19, 2004 (aged 57) Thompson, Connecticut, U.S.
- Relatives: Tommy Baldwin Jr. Luke Baldwin; Jack Baldwin

NASCAR Whelen Modified Tour
- Years active: 1985–2004
- Car number: No. 7NY
- Starts: 373
- Wins: 6
- Poles: 7
- Best finish: 3rd in 1992

Thomas S. Baldwin Sr. (March 14, 1947 – August 19, 2004) was an American NASCAR Modified race driver. Originally taught racing in East Patchogue by Michael Andreano (“Patchogue Flash”), Baldwin would go on to compete for forty seasons, winning six modified races as well as numerous other races. His eleven wins at Riverhead Raceway spanned from June 30, 1978 to June 6, 1992. He was given the "Most Popular Driver" award on the Modified tour for 2003. He died in an accident on lap ten of the New England Dodge Dealers 150 at the Thompson International Speedway on August 19, 2004. He spun into the infield to miss another competitor's car and struck a concrete block protecting a light pole driver's side first.

Baldwin had a daughter, Tammy, and a son, Tommy Baldwin Jr., who was a crew chief and a car owner in the NASCAR Cup Series.

A memorial golf outing and a 77-lap memorial race (at Riverhead Raceway) are run in his honor Tommy Baldwin Racing (run by his son) also switched when available to No. 7 (with a "7NY" design) to honor his father.

== Motorsports career results ==
=== NASCAR ===
(key) (Bold – Pole position awarded by qualifying time. Italics – Pole position earned by points standings or practice time. * – Most laps led.)

==== Winston Cup Series ====
NASCAR Winston Cup Series results
Year	Team	No.	Make	1	2	3	4	5	6	7	8	9	10	11	12	13	14	15	16	17	18	19	20	21	22	23	24	25	26	27	28	29	30	31	32	33	34	NWCC	Pts	Ref
1999	LJ Racing	91	Chevy	DAY	CAR	LVS	ATL	DAR	TEX	BRI	MAR	TAL	CAL	RCH	CLT	DOV	MCH	POC	SON	DAY	NHA	POC	IND	GLN	MCH	BRI	DAR	RCH; DNQ	NHA	DOV	MAR	CLT	TAL	CAR	PHO	HOM	ATL	NA	-	

==== Craftsman Truck Series ====
NASCAR Craftsman Truck Series results
Year	Team	No.	Make	1	2	3	4	5	6	7	8	9	10	11	12	13	14	15	16	17	18	19	20	21	22	23	24	25	26	27	NCTC	Pts	Ref
1997	Thompson Racing	22	Ford	WDW	TUS	HOM	PHO	POR	EVG	I70	NHA	TEX	BRI	NZH	MLW	LVL	CNS	HPT	IRP	FLM	NSV	GLN	RCH; DNQ	MAR; DNQ	SON	MMR	CAL	PHO	LVS		134th	56	
1998	Hess Racing	48	Chevy	WDW	HOM	PHO	POR	EVG	I70	GLN	TEX	BRI	MLW	NZH	CAL	PPR	IRP	NHA	FLM	NSV	HPT	LVL	RCH; DNQ	MEM	GTY	MAR	SON	MMR	PHO	LVS	129th	22	
