= 2024 SMART Modified Tour =

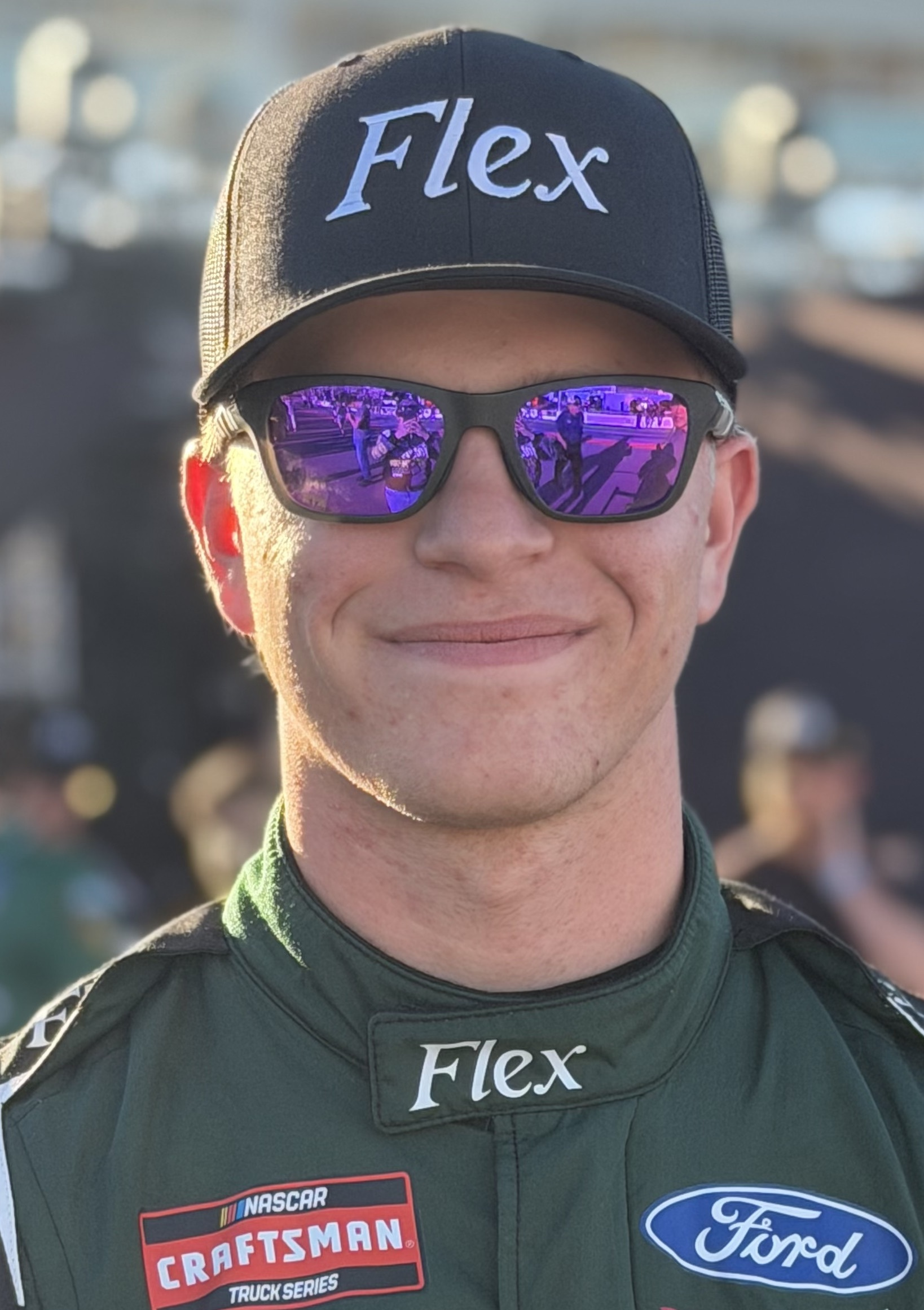
Luke Baldwin, 2024 SMART Modified Tour champion.

The 2024 SMART Modified Tour was the 20th season of the SMART Modified Tour. It began with the Peanut Patch 99 at Florence Motor Speedway on March 2. It ended with the Season Finale 99 at North Wilkesboro Speedway on October 20.

This was the first season where the tour implemented a playoff format, beginning at Dominion Raceway on September 14, where the top five in the standings would advance to the first round of the playoffs. After the race at South Boston Speedway on October 12, there were originally meant to be the top-three drivers advancing to the final round, the number was increased to five after the car of Burt Myers, who had won that race, was found to have an illegal but permitted carburetor package in inspection. This led to a five-way fight between Myers, Luke Baldwin, Carson Loftin, Ryan Newman, and Danny Bohn at the season finale at North Wilkesboro, where Baldwin won his first title, ahead of Loftin, Newman, Myers, and Bohn respectively.

== Schedule ==
No.	Race title	Track	Date
1	Peanut Patch 99	Florence Motor Speedway, Timmonsville, South Carolina	March 2
2	Warrior 100	Caraway Speedway, Asheboro, North Carolina	March 10
3	Pace-O-Matic King of the Modifieds	South Boston Speedway, South Boston, Virginia	March 24
4	Cardinal 99	Tri-County Motor Speedway, Hudson, North Carolina	March 30
5	Rumble in Rougemont	Orange County Speedway, Rougemont, North Carolina	April 6
6	Hickory Hundred	Hickory Motor Speedway, Hickory, North Carolina	April 13
7	Kenny Minter Classic	Franklin County Speedway, Callaway, Virginia	May 24
8	Revolutionary 99	Caraway Speedway, Asheboro, North Carolina	July 6
9	Pace-O-Matic 99	New River All-American Speedway, Jacksonville, North Carolina	August 31
10	Carteret Clash	Carteret Motor Speedway, Swansboro, North Carolina	August 31
11	Robert Jeffreys Memorial	Caraway Speedway, Asheboro, North Carolina	September 7
12	Flying VA Classic	Dominion Raceway, Thornburg, Virginia	September 14
13	The Battle of SoBo	South Boston Speedway, South Boston, Virginia	October 12
14	Season-Finale 99	North Wilkesboro Speedway, North Wilkesboro, North Carolina	October 20

== Results and standings ==
=== Races ===
No.	Race	Fastest qualifier	Most laps led	Winning driver
1	Peanut Patch 99	Matt Hirschman	Matt Hirschman	Carson Loftin
2	Warrior 100	Jake Crum	N/A	Carson Loftin
3	Pace-O-Matic King of the Modifieds	Luke Baldwin	Matt Hirschman	Luke Baldwin
4	Cardinal 99	Burt Myers	Jimmy Blewett	Ryan Newman
5	Rumble in Rougemont	Burt Myers	Blake Barney	Carson Loftin (Note: Blake Barney originally won the race, but was disqualified due a post race technical violation. Carson Loftin, who originally finished second, was inherited the win.)
6	Hickory Hundred	Matt Hirschman	Matt Hirschman	Carson Loftin
7	Kenny Minter Classic	Luke Baldwin	N/A	Carson Loftin
8	Revolutionary 99	Brandon Ward	N/A	Bobby Labonte
9	Pace-O-Matic 99	Danny Bohn	Danny Bohn	Ryan Newman
10	Carteret Clash	Bobby Labonte	Luke Baldwin	Danny Bohn
11	Robert Jeffreys Memorial	Luke Baldwin	N/A	Brandon Ward
12	Flying VA Classic	N/A	Luke Baldwin	Luke Baldwin
13	The Battle of SoBo	Patrick Staropoli	N/A	Burt Myers
14	Season Finale 99	Matt Hirschman	Justin Bonsignore	Justin Bonsignore

=== Drivers' championship ===
(key) Bold - Pole position awarded by time. Italics - Pole position set by final practice results or rainout. * – Most laps led.

Pos	Driver	FLO	CRW	SBO	TRI	ROU	HCY	FCS	CRW	JAC	CAR	CRW	DOM	SBO	NWS	Points
1	Luke Baldwin	5	7	**1**	5	5	6	**2**	21	3	4	**6**	1*	4	3	540
2	Carson Loftin	1	1	13	4	1	1	1	15	4	5	13	6	16	7	534
3	Ryan Newman	3	2	23	1	9	7	5	13	1	3	10	18	2	8	533
4	Burt Myers	2	17	6	**14**	**4**	2	13	4	9	20	4	4	1	24	517
5	Danny Bohn	7	5	19	10	12	12	3	2	**2**	1	5	3	5	25	516
SMART Modified Tour playoff cutoff
6	Joey Coulter	4	10	12	7	18	4	4	10	13	10	15	17	6	9	437
7	Tom Buzze	14	21	18	3	6	10	6	6	11	7	9	8	22	23	416
8	Anthony Bello	13	12	5	11	7	14	16	8	23	12	3	16	9	17	410
9	Jonathan Cash	16	14	4	15	3	9	14	12	10	2	12	7	24	28	408
10	Jason Myers	10	6	14	6	11	13	8	9	20	21	11	9	14	13	406
11	Jimmy Blewett	6	4	DNS	2*	2	8	15	14	18	13	7	2	18		404
12	Jimmy Wallace	23	15	8	12	15	22	19	19	16	14	21	14	15	11	350
13	Brian Loftin	11	18	DNS	19	19		17	11	6	17	2	10	13		328
14	Daniel Yates		20	21		8	11	11	17	15	23	17		10	14	285
15	Jake Crum	DNS	**22**	15	9		5	12		8	11			3	4	282
16	Brandon Ward	9	16	7		10		7	**3**			1		8		275
17	Jason Tutterow	20	23	9			20		20	17	18			19	20	222
18	Jonathan Kievman		25		17	16	17	20		24	6			23	12	209
19	Matt Hirschman	**12***	9	2*			**3***								**2**	195
20	Gary Young Jr.	19	26	26		17		21		14	15			25	15	194
21	Bobby Labonte		3						1		9		11		6	186
22	Blake Barney	15	8	22	16	DSQ*				12	19					175
23	Cody Norman		24		13		18		7		16	18		21		170
24	William Lambros	8	11	17	8											121
25	John-Michael Shenette				DNS					19	DNS		15		29	101
26	Sam Rameau							10					5		10	99
27	Gary Putnam	22	19			13			16							94
28	Frank Fleming	17										8		17		81
29	Chris Finocchario				18		15						13			78
30	Michael Ritch								5			14		28		76
31	Josh Lowder								18	7		22				76
32	Jack Baldwin									5	8					69
33	Patrick Staropoli							9						**7**		66
34	Ethan Truell											20		20	22	61
35	Jayden Harman			10		14										58
36	Landon Huffman												12	27		54
37	Dwight Sauls								22	21				26		54
38	Bryce Bailey	21		30			19									53
39	Slate Myers											19		12		51
40	Justin Bonsignore														1*	50
41	John Holleman IV											16			16	50
42	Austin Kochenash		13	24												44
43	Carsten DiGiantomasso									22	22					38
44	Doug Coby			3												38
45	Austin Beers														5	36
46	Chris Pasteryak			DNS			16									34
47	Mike Speeney													11		31
48	Tyler Barry			11												30
49	Andrew Krause			25											27	29
50	Ryan Preece							17								27
51	Woody Pitkat			16												24
52	Matt Kimball														18	23
53	Randall Richard	18														23
54	Norman Newman														19	22
55	Bobby Measmer Jr.				DNS											21
56	Caleb Heady			20												21
57	Chris Hatton Jr.														21	20
58	Daniel Beeson						21									20
59	Spencer Martin											23				18
60	Brian Weber						23									18
61	Tim Connolly														26	15
62	Stephen Kopcik			27												14
63	Jim Gavek			28												13
64	Andrew Harrah													DNS		12
65	Paul Hartwig Jr.			29												12
	David Pletcher	24														0
Pos	Driver	FLO	CRW	SBO	TRI	ROU	HCY	FCS	CRW	JAC	CAR	CRW	DOM	SBO	NWS	Points

== See also ==
- 2024 NASCAR Cup Series
- 2024 NASCAR Xfinity Series
- 2024 NASCAR Craftsman Truck Series
- 2024 ARCA Menards Series
- 2024 ARCA Menards Series East
- 2024 ARCA Menards Series West
- 2024 NASCAR Whelen Modified Tour
- 2024 NASCAR Canada Series
- 2024 NASCAR Mexico Series
- 2024 NASCAR Whelen Euro Series
- 2024 NASCAR Brasil Sprint Race
- 2024 CARS Tour
- 2024 ASA STARS National Tour
