= Jayden Harman =

American racing driver (born 2008)

- Nationality: American
- Born: November 18, 2008 (age 17) Rock Glen, Pennsylvania, U.S.

NASCAR Whelen Modified Tour career
- Debut season: 2026
- Current team: Tommy Wanick
- Years active: 2026–present
- Car number: 9
- Crew chief: Mark Harman
- Starts: 4
- Championships: 0
- Wins: 0
- Poles: 0
- Best finish: 26th in 2026
- Finished last season: 26th (2026)
- Statistics up to date as of October 12, 2026.

Jayden Harman (born November 18, 2008) is an American professional stock car racing driver who currently competes part-time in the NASCAR Whelen Modified Tour, driving the No. 9 for Wanick Motorsports.

Harman first started racing at the age of four, where he competed in go karts. He then went on to compete in Micro Sprints before moving on to race in street stocks and crate modifieds.

In 2026, Harman made his debut in the NASCAR Whelen Modified Tour at Seekonk Speedway, driving the No. 9 for Wanick Motorsports, where he started in 21st and finished in the top-ten in eighth.

Harman has also previously competed in the SMART Modified Tour and the Race of Champions Asphalt Modified Tour, and is a frequent competitor at Evergreen Raceway.

== Motorsports results ==
=== NASCAR ===
(key) (Bold – Pole position awarded by qualifying time. Italics – Pole position earned by points standings or practice time. * – Most laps led.)

==== Whelen Modified Tour ====
NASCAR Whelen Modified Tour results
Year	Car owner	No.	Make	1	2	3	4	5	6	7	8	9	10	11	12	13	14	15	16	NWMTC	Pts	Ref
2026	Tommy Wanick	9	N/A	NSM	MAR	THO	SEE; 8	RIV	OXF	SEE	CLM; 15	WMM; 14	MON; 16	THO	NHA	STA	OSW	RIV	THO	26th	123	

=== SMART Modified Tour ===
SMART Modified Tour results
Year	Car owner	No.	Make	1	2	3	4	5	6	7	8	9	10	11	12	13	14	SMTC	Pts	Ref
2024	Mark Harman	51	N/A	FLO	CRW	SBO; 10	TRI	ROU; 14	HCY	FCS	CRW	JAC	CAR	CRW	DOM	SBO	NWS	35th	58	
2025	Mark Harman	51	N/A	FLO	AND	SBO; 10	ROU	HCY	FCS	CRW	CPS	CAR	CRW	DOM	FCS	TRI	NWS	44th	31	
2026	Mark Harman	51	N/A	FLO	AND	SBO; 20	DOM	HCY	WKS	FCR	CRW	PUL	CAR	ROU	TRI	NWS		61st	21	
