= Tommy Baldwin Jr. =

American racing team owner (born 1966)

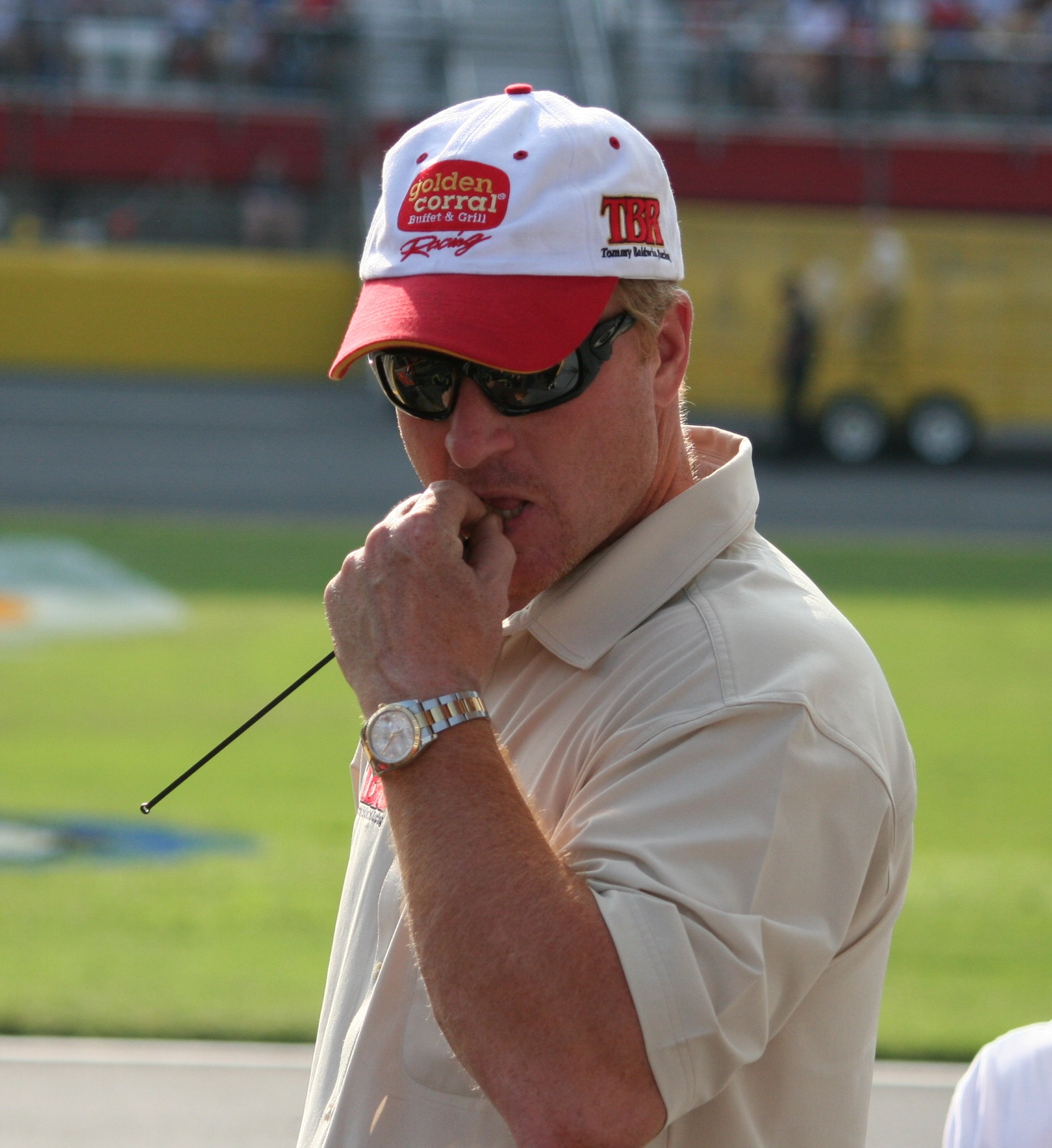
- Baldwin in 2011
- Born: Thomas S. Baldwin Jr. October 27, 1966 (age 60); Bellport, New York, U.S.
- Occupations: Podcast host of Door, Bumper, Clear (DBC) with Dirty Mo Media
- Known for: NASCAR crew chief Owner of Tommy Baldwin Racing
- Spouse: Beth Bruce (m. 2002)

Thomas S. Baldwin Jr. (born October 27, 1966) is an American team majority owner of Tommy Baldwin Racing. He is also the competition director of Nitro Motorsports in the ARCA Menards Series. His father, Tom Baldwin, was a champion modified driver. Baldwin himself briefly pursued a racing career before becoming a mechanic.

== Mechanic career ==
Baldwin started as a crew chief in 1997 for the No. 20 Hardee's Ford for Ranier-Walsh Racing. After Hardee's was acquired by CKE Restaurants early in the year, the chain's new parent company pulled their sponsorship, forcing the team to shut down. Baldwin soon became the crew chief for car owner Junie Donlavey and driver Dick Trickle. After a little over a year with the team, during which the pairing of Trickle & Baldwin garnered the team its first top-five finishes in three seasons, he moved to Bill Davis Racing as the crew chief for Ward Burton in the fall of 1998. Burton and Baldwin won four races together, including the 2002 Daytona 500, until his departure late that season. In 2003, Baldwin became the crew chief of the No. 7 Dodge Intrepid for Ultra Motorsports driven by Jimmy Spencer.

After Sirius' departure from the team, Baldwin joined Evernham Motorsports as the crew chief for Kasey Kahne. Kahne won NASCAR Rookie of the Year honors in 2004 with Baldwin, and won his first race with him at Richmond International Raceway the following season. Between 2003 and 2004, Baldwin fielded a Busch Series team with Eddie D'Hondt driven by a variety of drivers, including Wally Dallenbach Jr., Damon Lusk, Tracy Hines, and Paul Wolfe. He sold the team to Evernham following 2004.

After 2005, Baldwin joined Robert Yates Racing to work with Elliott Sadler midway through the season, he left to return with BDR.

== NASCAR owner ==
Baldwin announced on January 6, 2009 that he started his own Sprint Cup Series team named Tommy Baldwin Racing, running Toyotas. Scott Riggs was named to pilot the car for the 2009 season. Baldwin's cars for the Daytona 500 were mainly built and assembled by volunteer crew members who were laid off by other race teams affected by the economic crisis. The No. 36 qualified for the race and earned a three-race sponsorship from Red Bank Outfitters and a one-race deal with Mahindra Tractors (which jumped aboard after Mike Skinner failed to qualify). During much of Speedweeks, the car was unsponsored and white.

On May 25, 2009, Riggs announced that he would leave TBR following the Coca-Cola 600 at Lowe's Motor Speedway. Riggs was 42nd in the point standings, with eight starts in the first 12 Sprint Cup races this season. His best finish was 25th, which came at the Daytona 500.

Baldwin immediately announced that Skinner, Patrick Carpentier and Brian Simo would be sharing driving duties in the No. 36 Toyota for the remainder of the 2009 season. Carpentier filled in for Skinner when Camping World Truck Series commitments prevented him from driving in the Cup Series. Simo failed to qualify for both road course events. In September Michael McDowell replaced Carpentier and Robert Richardson ran the November Talladega race. For much of the 2009 season, TBR was a start and park operation, the reason Riggs left the team.

In 2010, Tommy Baldwin Racing hired Mike Bliss to drive car No. 36. Wave Energy Drink returned as sponsor and the team also switched to Chevrolet in 2010. The team later used a number of drivers after Bliss left, including Geoff Bodine, Steve Park, Johnny Sauter, Ron Fellows, Casey Mears, J. J. Yeley, and Dave Blaney. TBR also ran a No. 35 for a handful of races.

For 2011, Baldwin retained Blaney for a full season in the No. 36. The team once again went to Daytona with an unsponsored vehicle, but earned sponsorship from Golden Corral at Daytona after the team made the race. Accell Construction, All Sport, and Big Red also supported the team throughout the season. Blaney led at Daytona and Talladega and nearly pulled off upset victories at both tracks before being involved in late race incidents just laps before the finish. After a 13th-place finish at Richmond, the team moved into the Top 35 in owner's points for the first time in its three-year history. Ron Fellows drove the car at Watkins Glen, Stephen Leicht piloted the No. 36 at Richmond, and Mike Skinner at Atlanta after medical issues forced Blaney from the car. The No. 36 team finished 33rd in owner's points, which guaranteed the team a starting spot in the 2012 Daytona 500. In January 2012, Baldwin sold the owner's points from the No. 36 to Stewart–Haas Racing to allow the No. 10, driven by Danica Patrick, to be locked into the Daytona 500. Baldwin also ran the No. 35 with Park, Bodine, and Blaney on a part-time basis.

TBR's best finish is third, which they've done twice. Blaney drove the 36 to third at the October 2011 Talladega race and Regan Smith drove the No. 7 Chevrolet to third-place finish at the August 2016 rain-shortened Pocono race. TBR shut down their Cup team after the 2016 season, though it was revived for the 2017 Daytona 500 with Elliott Sadler.

In 2017, Baldwin joined the newly-formed Halmar Friesen Racing Truck team as a team manager. In August, Baldwin left the team, with HFR co-owner Chris Larsen citing a lack of progress as why the two decided to split. Baldwin later become the Competition Director at Premium Motorsports, while also serving as crew chief of the team's No. 15 Cup car.

In 2019, Baldwin joined back into the Monster Energy NASCAR Cup Series with a part time car starting with Daytona.

Baldwin joined Rick Ware Racing in 2023 as their competition director in the Cup Series, until he left in 2026. Several months later, it was revealed that he had moved to Nitro Motorsports in a competition role.

== Personal life ==
Baldwin's sons, Jack and Luke, compete in lower-tier NASCAR racing as well as modified racing.

Baldwin revealed that he was diagnosed with a treatable cancer in August 2023. His modified team was put on a hiatus as a result.

Since 2025, he has also been a podcast host of Door, Bumper, Clear (DBC) with Freddie Kraft and Karsyn Elledge on Dirty Mo Media.
