= Lancaster Motorplex =

- Location: Lancaster, New York
- Coordinates: 42°57′02″N 78°37′38″W
- Owner: Mike Swinarski, Scott Nurmi
- Opened: 1959
- Former names: New York International Raceway Park, Lancaster Raceway Park, Lancaster Motorsports Park, Lancaster Speedway, Lancaster National Speedway; Elegant Builders Raceway Park; Dunn Tire Raceway Park
- Major events: Future: NASCAR Whelen Modified Tour (2021, 2023–2025, 2027)

Oval
- Surface: Asphalt
- Length: 0.625 mi (1.006 km)
- Turns: 4
- Banking: 6° (turns 1–2), 9° (turns 3–4)

Dragway
- Surface: Asphalt
- Length: 0.125 mi (0.201 km)

Inner Oval
- Surface: Asphalt
- Length: 0.250 mi (0.402 km)
- Turns: 4

Lancaster Motorplex is an automotive racing facility in the Buffalo-Niagara Region of Western New York which features a 0.625 mi (1.006 km) slightly banked D-shaped asphalt oval. The complex also includes a quarter-mile inner oval and an eighth-mile dragway.

== Overview ==
The Lancaster Motorplex opened by Roy Milligan a contractor from Rochester, NY with the backing of investors Ed Serwacki and 10 partners in 1959 as the Lancaster Speedway. The campus originally included a dirt oval track, a half-mile drag strip, sports car course and clubhouse complete with showers, but the surface was paved in 1963. By 1971 Serwacki had bought out most of his partners, and sold the complex to Jim Vollertsen, former promoter of the Spencer Speedway in Williamson, New York. Vollersten owned the property until 1984, and his upgrades included incorporating the drag strip into the oval in 1976.

In 1989 Alex Friesen, whose family also owned the Ransomville Speedway, purchased the facility from Alan Moore and Bob Fedder. Following Friesen's death in late 1996 the family continued to manage the racetrack until selling it to Gordon Reger, who then operated the venue for the next 20 years.

In 2019 Reger leased the facility to a group of investors who renamed the complex the New York International Raceway Park. Headed by drag racer Mike Swinarski and stock car driver Scott Nurmi, the investor group reorganized in 2022 to purchase the facility outright, rebranding it the Lancaster Motorplex.

== Events ==
On most Tuesday, Wednesday and Friday nights throughout the racing season, the Motorplex hosts a variety of Junior Dragsters, Trophy Class, Senior Nostalgia and other classes competing on the drag strip.

Saturday nights feature oval track racing, with weekly racing by the Sportsman, Street Stocks, and 4 Cylinders, supplemented by special appearances by the NASCAR Whelen Modified Tour and Race of Champions Asphalt Modified Series, Asphalt Super Late Models, Supermodifieds, and TQ Midgets.
