= 2014 NASCAR Whelen Southern Modified Tour =

The 2014 NASCAR Whelen Southern Modified Tour was the tenth season of the NASCAR Whelen Southern Modified Tour (WSMT). It began with the UNOH Battle at the Beach at Daytona International Speedway on February 18, which did not count towards the championship. The first race for the championship was the Whelen Season Opener 150 at Caraway Speedway on March 9. It ended with the Southern Slam 150 at Charlotte Motor Speedway on October 9. George Brunnhoelzl III entered the season as the defending Drivers' Champion.

A previous two-time series runner-up, Andy Seuss won his first championship title, after a fifth-place finish at the final race in Charlotte. Seuss, who won a trio of races in the opening half of the season – two at Caraway Speedway and one at South Boston Speedway – finished 14 points clear of Brunnhoelzl III, who won a pair of races at Langley Speedway and also at Caraway Speedway. Third place in the championship went to Burt Myers, who won the most races during the season, with four, all of which came during the second half of the season. Aside from the lead trio, other drivers to take race victories were J. R. Bertuccio, who won at Southern National Motorsports Park, Danny Bohn was a winner at Bowman Gray Stadium and Kyle Ebersole won the season's second race at South Boston Speedway. A combination race was also held during the season, the Bush's Beans 150 at Bristol Motor Speedway, with competitors from the Whelen Southern Modified Tour competing along with competitors for the Whelen Modified Tour. The race was won by Tommy Barrett Jr. and the best Southern Modified Tour competitor was Bertuccio in 13th position.

== Drivers ==
No.	Manufacturer	Car Owner	Race Driver	Crew Chief
1	Ford	Kim Myers	Burt Myers	Ronnie Holbrook
2	Chevrolet	Joe Bertuccio Sr.	J. R. Bertuccio (Note: At the Bush's Beans 150 at Bristol, a number of drivers drove with different numbers than normal: J. R. Bertuccio drove car number 21, instead of his regular car number 2, while Jason Myers drove car number 03, instead of his regular car number 4. Bobby Measmer Jr. drove car number 76, instead of his regular car number 51.)	Joe Bertuccio Sr.
4	Ford	Gary Myers	Jason Myers	Mike Queen
5	Ford	Bob Ebersole	Kyle Ebersole	Bob Ebersole
7	Chevrolet	Mark Hunter	Thomas Stinson10	Mark Hunter
8	Chevrolet	Bobby Baldwin	Dalton Baldwin4 (R)	TBA
09	Chevrolet	Eddie Harvey	Zach Brewer1	TBA
11	Chevrolet	Eddie Harvey	Andy Seuss	Eddie Harvey
12	Chevrolet	Donna Norman	Mike Norman13	T. J. Moran
12	Chevrolet	Donna Norman	Jeremy Gerstner1	T. J. Moran
13	Chevrolet	Amy Fleming	Chris Fleming1 (R)	TBA
15	Chevrolet	Grady Jeffreys Jr.	Joe Ryan Osborne13 (R)	Grady Jeffreys Jr.
15	Chevrolet	Grady Jeffreys Jr.	Austin Pack1	Grady Jeffreys Jr.
23	Chevrolet	Bobby Loftin	Brian Loftin7	Scott Widener
28	Chevrolet	George Brunnhoelzl Jr.	George Brunnhoelzl III	George Brunnhoelzl Jr.
31	Chevrolet	Michael Speeney	Cody Ware1 (R)	Mack Kanupp
40	Ford13	Gina Fleming	Luke Fleming	Frank Fleming
40	Chevrolet1	Gina Fleming	Luke Fleming	Frank Fleming
41	Chevrolet	Jodie Preece	Ryan Preece2	TBA
43	Chevrolet	Michael Calabrese	David Calabrese	Bobby Foley
44	Chevrolet	Bryan Fishel	Brandon Ward1	TBA
51	Chevrolet	Bob Dillner	Bobby Measmer Jr. (R)	Ernie Mayo
54	Chevrolet	Connie Lythgoe	Jeff Fultz1	TBA
65	Chevrolet	Eddie Bohn	Danny Bohn	Eddie Bohn
70	Chevrolet	Dawn Gerstner	Jeremy Gerstner2	TBA
72	Chevrolet	Bud McIntyre	Bud McIntyre2 (R)	TBA
72	Chevrolet	Bud McIntyre	Justin Taylor1 (R)	TBA
73	Chevrolet	Todd Powell	Cole Powell4	TBA
77	Chevrolet	Mike Curb	Gary Putnam	Donald Tarantino
79	Pontiac	Susan Hill	Spencer Davis (R)	Jason Shephard
80	Chevrolet	Michael Speeney	Daniel Speeney4	TBA
95	Chevrolet	Bubba Gale	Cale Gale1	TBA
97	Chevrolet	Bryan Dauzat	Bryan Dauzat10	Todd Cooper
98	Chevrolet	Mike Curb	Ryan Preece1	TBA
99	Chevrolet	Susanne Winstead	A. J. Winstead7 (R)	Neil Culley Jr.

== Schedule ==
The UNOH Battle at the Beach did not count towards the championship.

No.	Race title	Track	Date	TV
	UNOH Battle at the Beach	Daytona International Speedway, Daytona Beach, Florida	February 18	FS2
1	Whelen Season Opener 150	Caraway Speedway, Asheboro, North Carolina	March 9	
2	Southern National 150	Southern National Motorsports Park, Kenly, North Carolina	March 15	
3	South Boston 150	South Boston Speedway, South Boston, Virginia	April 5	FansChoice.TV
4	Courtyard by Marriott/Pepsi 150	Langley Speedway, Hampton, Virginia	April 12	FansChoice.TV
5	Daggett Schuler Attorneys at Law 150	Caraway Speedway, Asheboro, North Carolina	July 4	
6	Strutmasters.com 199	Bowman Gray Stadium, Winston-Salem, North Carolina	August 2	
7	Bush's Beans 150 (Note: The Bush's Beans 150 was held as a combined event, with competitors from the Whelen Southern Modified Tour competing along with competitors for the Whelen Modified Tour. The race was run with a series-based point distribution, where drivers received points and statistical credit for their finish relative to other drivers in their series, not to the whole field in general.)	Bristol Motor Speedway, Bristol, Tennessee	August 20	FS1
8	Bayport 150	Langley Speedway, Hampton, Virginia	August 30	FansChoice.TV
9	Southern Pride 150	Caraway Speedway, Asheboro, North Carolina	September 5	
10	South Boston 150	South Boston Speedway, South Boston, Virginia	September 13	
11	Southern National 150	Southern National Motorsports Park, Kenly, North Carolina	September 20	
12	Zooland 150	Caraway Speedway, Asheboro, North Carolina	September 27	
13	Prestoria Farms 150	Caraway Speedway, Asheboro, North Carolina	October 4^{1}	
14	Southern Slam 150	Charlotte Motor Speedway, Concord, North Carolina	October 9	FansChoice.TV

Notes

- ^{1} – The Prestoria Farms 150 was originally scheduled for March 29, but was postponed to October 4 due to heavy rain.
- The Bunny Hop 150 was originally scheduled to be held at Caraway Speedway on April 19, but was postponed due to heavy rain. On May 7, it was announced that the race would not be rescheduled.

== Results and standings ==
=== Races ===
No.	Race	Pole position	Most laps led	Winning driver	Manufacturer
	UNOH Battle at the Beach	Ryan Preece	Ryan Preece	Doug Coby	Ford
1	Whelen Season Opener 150	Andy Seuss	Andy Seuss	Andy Seuss	Chevrolet
2	Southern National 150	George Brunnhoelzl III	J. R. Bertuccio	J. R. Bertuccio	Chevrolet
3	South Boston 150	Danny Bohn	Andy Seuss	Andy Seuss	Chevrolet
4	Courtyard by Marriott/Pepsi 150	Ryan Preece	George Brunnhoelzl III	George Brunnhoelzl III	Chevrolet
5	Daggett Schuler Attorneys at Law 150	Andy Seuss	Andy Seuss	Andy Seuss	Chevrolet
6	Strutmasters.com 199	Danny Bohn	Danny Bohn	Danny Bohn	Chevrolet
7	Bush's Beans 150	Burt Myers	Bobby Santos III	J. R. Bertuccio	Chevrolet
8	Bayport 150	Ryan Preece	Ryan Preece	Burt Myers	Ford
9	Southern Pride 150	George Brunnhoelzl III	George Brunnhoelzl III	Burt Myers	Ford
10	South Boston 150	Danny Bohn	Danny Bohn	Kyle Ebersole	Ford
11	Southern National 150	Burt Myers	Burt Myers	Burt Myers	Ford
12	Zooland 150	Brian Loftin	George Brunnhoelzl III	George Brunnhoelzl III	Chevrolet
13	Prestoria Farms 150	Danny Bohn	Burt Myers	Danny Bohn	Chevrolet
14	Southern Slam 150	Ryan Preece	Burt Myers	Burt Myers	Ford

=== Drivers' championship ===
(key) Bold - Pole position awarded by time. Italics - Pole position set by final practice results or rainout. * – Most laps led.

Pos	Driver	DAY‡	CRW	SNM	SBO	LGY	CRW	BGS	BRI	LGY	CRW	SBO	SNM	CRW	CRW	CLT	Points
1	Andy Seuss		**1***	4	1*	2	**1***	4	27	3	2	2	8	5	4	5	583
2	George Brunnhoelzl III		2	**3**	2	1*	2	16	14	2	**12***	3	2	1*	12	3	569
3	Burt Myers	5	4	5	6	6	17	10	15	1	1	4	**1***	2	16*	1*	560
4	J. R. Bertuccio	10	3	1*	5	12	3	14	13	4	7	5	6	3	7	2	552
5	Danny Bohn		6	12	**3**	15	4	**1***	20	7	5	**6***	7	4	**1**	9	542
6	Kyle Ebersole		14	2	10	DNQ	5	6	36	6	3	1	3	11	3	4	520
7	Luke Fleming	3	8	6	4	4	13	3	16	10	6	14	11	7	5	10	511
8	Gary Putnam		12	7	8	10	6	7	29	8	10	11	13	14	11	12	477
9	Spencer Davis **(R)**		11	9	13	11	9	5	18	14	15	7	10	13	6	14	475
10	Jason Myers	2	5	11	7	9	7	13	39	5	16	8	9	6	17	21	465
11	David Calabrese		19	18	14	3	10	17	24	11	4	17	4	12	14	16	452
12	Joe Ryan Osborne **(R)**		10	8	9	8	18	8	25	17	DNS^{2}	9	5	10	15		430
13	Bobby Measmer Jr. **(R)**		17	16	17	7	12	19	31	12	14	15	12	9	10	22	421
14	Mike Norman		16	13	12	13	14	16		16	11	12	15	15	9	8	400
15	Bryan Dauzat	DNQ	15	10	11	DNQ	8	11	28		8	18				17	315
16	Thomas Stinson		9	15	16	14	11	15		13		10	DNS^{2}			23	298
17	Brian Loftin		7	14		16	15					13		**8**	2		235
18	A. J. Winstead **(R)**	22		17	15			9		15		19	14			15	204
19	Cole Powell	19	18					2	17^{1}						13	7	136
20	Daniel Speeney										9	16		18	8		125
21	Dalton Baldwin **(R)**	21					16				13			16		18	113
22	Ryan Preece	**4***				**5**			11^{1}	**9***						**20**	102
23	Jeremy Gerstner	23						12	38							13	91
24	Bud McIntyre **(R)**	DNQ					19									24	45
25	Zach Brewer															6	38
26	Chris Fleming **(R)**															11	33
27	Jeff Fultz								30								32
28	Cody Ware **(R)**	7	13														31
29	Cale Gale								32								30
30	Justin Taylor													17			27
31	Brandon Ward													DNS^{2}			25
32	Austin Pack															19	25
Drivers ineligible for NWSMT points, because they only drove the non-championship round
	John Beatty Jr. **(R)**	14															
	Rob Fuller	16															
	Dave Sapienza **(R)**	17															
	Kyle Benjamin **(R)**	20															
	Johnny Kievman	25															
	Dave Brigati	26															
	Gary Fountain Sr. **(R)**	DNQ															
	Matt Montineri **(R)**	DNQ															
Drivers ineligible for NWSMT points, because at the combined event at Bristol they chose to drive for NWMT points
	Tommy Barrett Jr. **(R)**	6							1								
	Bobby Santos III								2*								
	Ron Silk	8							3								
	Doug Coby	1							4								
	Ryan Newman								5								
	Justin Bonsignore	18							**6**								
	Eric Goodale	9							7								
	Timmy Solomito **(R)**	15							8								
	Patrick Emerling	12							9								
	Jimmy Zacharias **(R)**	24							10								
	Ron Yuhas Jr.								12								
	Woody Pitkat								19								
	Glen Reen								21								
	Ted Christopher								22								
	Matt Hirschman								23								
	Jamie Tomaino	13							26								
	Gary McDonald								33								
	Todd Szegedy								34								
	Donny Lia	11							35								
	Wade Cole								37								
Pos	Driver	DAY‡	CRW	SNM	SBO	LGY	CRW	BGS	BRI	LGY	CRW	SBO	SNM	CRW	CRW	CLT	Points

Notes

- ^{‡} – Non-championship round
- ^{1} – Scored points towards the Whelen Modified Tour.
- ^{2} – Joe Ryan Osborne, Thomas Stinson and Brandon Ward received championship points, despite the fact that they did not start the race.

== See also ==
- 2014 NASCAR Sprint Cup Series
- 2014 NASCAR Nationwide Series
- 2014 NASCAR Camping World Truck Series
- 2014 NASCAR K&N Pro Series East
- 2014 NASCAR K&N Pro Series West
- 2014 NASCAR Whelen Modified Tour
- 2014 NASCAR Canadian Tire Series
- 2014 NASCAR Toyota Series
- 2014 NASCAR Whelen Euro Series
