= 2013 NASCAR Whelen Southern Modified Tour =

The 2013 NASCAR Whelen Southern Modified Tour was the ninth season of the NASCAR Whelen Southern Modified Tour (WSMT). It began with the UNOH Battle at the Beach at Daytona International Speedway on February 19, which did not count towards the championship. The first race for the championship was the Charles Kepley Memorial 150 at Caraway Speedway on March 16. It ended with the Southern Slam 150 at Charlotte Motor Speedway on October 10. George Brunnhoelzl III, who entered the season as the defending Drivers' Champion, would win his fourth and final championship in the series, thirty-one points ahead of series runner up Kyle Ebersole.

== Schedule ==
The UNOH Battle at the Beach did not count towards the championship.

No.	Race title	Track	Date
	UNOH Battle at the Beach	Daytona International Speedway, Daytona Beach, Florida	February 19
1	Charles Kepley Memorial 150	Caraway Speedway, Asheboro, North Carolina	March 16
2	KOMA Unwind Relaxation Drink 150	Southern National Motorsports Park, Kenly, North Carolina	March 23
3	South Boston 150	South Boston Speedway, South Boston, Virginia	April 13
4	Spring Fling 150	Caraway Speedway, Asheboro, North Carolina	April 20
5	Daggett Schuler / Rusty Harpe Memorial 150	Caraway Speedway, Asheboro, North Carolina	July 5
6	Kevin Powell Motorsports 199	Bowman Gray Stadium, Winston-Salem, North Carolina	August 3
7	Titan Roof 150 (Note: The Titan Roof 150 was held as a combined event, with competitors from the Whelen Southern Modified Tour competing along with competitors for the Whelen Modified Tour. The race was run with a series-based point distribution, where drivers received points and statistical credit for their finish relative to other drivers in their series, not to the whole field in general.)	Bristol Motor Speedway, Bristol, Tennessee	August 21
8	Newport News Shipbuilding 150	Langley Speedway, Hampton, Virginia	August 31
9	Caraway 150	Caraway Speedway, Asheboro, North Carolina	September 8
10	Zooland 150	Caraway Speedway, Asheboro, North Carolina	September 28
11	G-Oil 150	Southern National Motorsports Park, Kenly, North Carolina	October 5
12	Southern Slam 150	Charlotte Motor Speedway, Concord, North Carolina	October 10

== Results and standings ==
=== Races ===
No.	Race	Pole position	Most laps led	Winning driver	Manufacturer
	UNOH Battle at the Beach	Todd Szegedy	Todd Szegedy	Steve Park	Ford
1	Charles Kepley Memorial 150	Tim Brown	Tim Brown	Jason Myers	Ford
2	KOMA Unwind Relaxation Drink 150	Ryan Preece	Ryan Preece	Burt Myers	Ford
3	South Boston 150	George Brunnhoelzl III	George Brunnhoelzl III	George Brunnhoelzl III	Chevrolet
4	Spring Fling 150	George Brunnhoelzl III	Tim Brown	George Brunnhoelzl III	Chevrolet
5	Daggett Schuler / Rusty Harpe Memorial 150	George Brunnhoelzl III	George Brunnhoelzl III	George Brunnhoelzl III	Chevrolet
6	Kevin Powell Motorsports 199	Ryan Preece	Ryan Preece	Ryan Preece	Chevrolet
7	Titan Roof 150	Donny Lia	Donny Lia	Mike Stefanik	Ford
8	Newport News Shipbuilding 150	Andy Seuss	Andy Seuss	Kyle Ebersole	Ford
9	Caraway 150	Andy Seuss	Andy Seuss	Andy Seuss	Chevrolet
10	Zooland 150	Burt Myers	Andy Seuss	Andy Seuss	Chevrolet
11	G-Oil 150	Burt Myers	Andy Seuss	Andy Seuss	Chevrolet
12	Southern Slam 150	Ryan Preece	Ryan Preece	Burt Myers	Ford

=== Drivers' championship ===
(key) Bold - Pole position awarded by time. Italics - Pole position set by final practice results or rainout. * – Most laps led.

Pos	Driver	DAY‡	CRW	SNM	SBO	CRW	CRW	BGS	BRI	LGY	CRW	CRW	SNM	CLT	Points
1	George Brunnhoelzl III		2	4	**1****	**1**	1**	14	14	2	2	2	2	3	506
2	Kyle Ebersole		3	7	3	3	2	11	13	1	6	12	4	2	475
3	Burt Myers	15	17	1	6	7	6	2	9	7	16	**8**	**3**	1	465
4	Andy Seuss	31	5	5	12	8	3	10	25	**14***	**1***	1*	1**	12	464
5	Tim Brown		**13***	3	5	2*	17	5	16	3	4	14	14	4	438
6	John Smith	27	9	16	4	12	16	6	15	4	3	3	8	7	435
7	Jason Myers	20	1	12	7	9	14	12	34	8	10	5	6	8	428
8	Luke Fleming	19	15	13	11	6	7	8	29	15	11	15	5	9	402
9	Danny Bohn	25	20	8	13	4	8	4		5	7	6	9	5	395
10	J. R. Bertuccio	14	14	15	15	11	9	16	35	13	5	4	7	14	392
11	Bryan Dauzat	18	10	14	16	13	11	17	19	11	13	7	17	19	373
12	Gary Putnam		6	18	8	10	5	9	20	10	8	9		21	372
13	Jeremy Gerstner	22	18	21	9	15	12	7	27	17	12	13	13	17	364
14	David Calabrese		19	24	19	14	13	18	DNQ^{1}	18	18	16	11	11	330
15	Mike Norman		12	19	17	17	10	15		19	14	10	12	13	326
16	Brian Loftin	7	11	23	2	5	4	20							199
17	A. J. Winstead									12	17	11	15	6	159
18	Thomas Stinson		8							9			10	10	139
19	Brandon Ward	30		9		16	15				9				127
20	Ryan Preece	26		**2***				**1****	4^{2}					**15***	123
21	Cole Powell	8	7					3	31^{2}					18	104
22	Renee Dupuis			22	10					16					84
23	Ted Christopher	3	4	6					17^{2}						78
24	Mike Speeney		16	20	18										78
25	Jimmy Zacharias	33		11					10						75
26	Dalton Baldwin	10		25					DNQ^{1}					16	75
27	Woody Pitkat	12		10				19	6^{2}						59
28	Jeff Fultz								DNQ^{1}		15				58
29	Cody Ware							13						20	55
30	Patrick Emerling	5							DNQ^{2}	6					38
31	Donnie Lacks				14										30
32	Steve Park	1							DNQ^{1}						30
33	Daryl Lacks												16		28
34	Eric Goodale	2		17					7^{2}						27
35	Danny Watts Jr.													22	22
Drivers ineligible for NWSMT points, because they only drove the non-championship rounds
	Kyle Larson	16													
	Gary Fountain Sr.	17													
	Matt Hirschman	28													
	Dave Brigati	32													
Drivers ineligible for NWSMT points, because at the combined event at Bristol they chose to drive for NWMT points
	Mike Stefanik	13							1						
	Todd Szegedy	**21***							2						
	Ron Yuhas Jr.								3						
	Ryan Newman								5						
	Justin Bonsignore	6							8						
	Chuck Hossfeld								11						
	Ron Silk	11							12						
	Ken Heagy	9							18						
	Ed Flemke Jr.								21						
	Jamie Tomaino	29							22						
	Doug Coby	4							23						
	Eric Berndt								24						
	Wade Cole								26						
	Rob Fuller								28						
	Donny Lia	23							**30***						
	Bobby Santos III	24							32						
	Rowan Pennink								33						
	Bryon Chew								36						
Pos	Driver	DAY‡	CRW	SNM	SBO	CRW	CRW	BGS	BRI	LGY	CRW	CRW	SNM	CLT	Points

Notes

- ^{‡} – Non-championship round
- ^{1} – David Calabrese, Dalton Baldwin, Steve Park and Jeff Fultz received championship points, despite the fact that the driver did not qualify for the race.
- ^{2} – Scored points towards the Whelen Modified Tour.

== See also ==
- 2013 NASCAR Sprint Cup Series
- 2013 NASCAR Nationwide Series
- 2013 NASCAR Camping World Truck Series
- 2013 ARCA Racing Series
- 2013 NASCAR Whelen Modified Tour
- 2013 NASCAR K&N Pro Series East
- 2013 NASCAR K&N Pro Series West
- 2013 NASCAR Canadian Tire Series
- 2013 NASCAR Toyota Series
- 2013 NASCAR Whelen Euro Series
