= 2014 NASCAR Whelen Modified Tour =

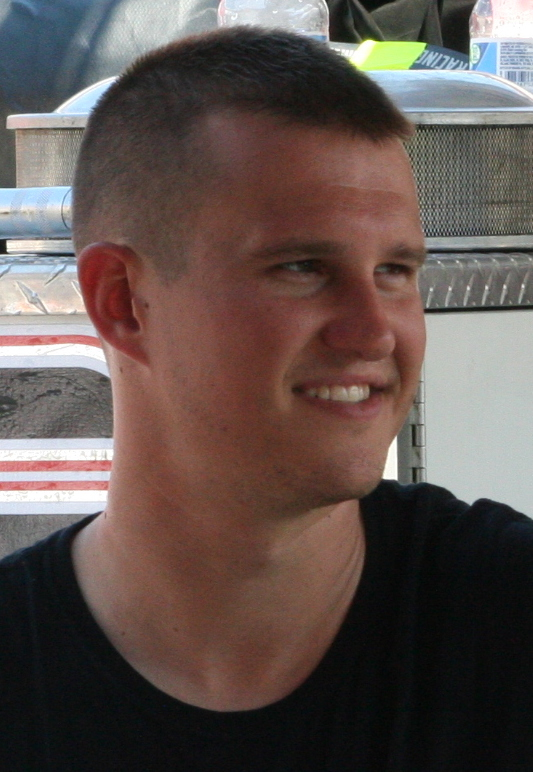
Ryan Preece finished second behind Coby in the championship by 22 points.

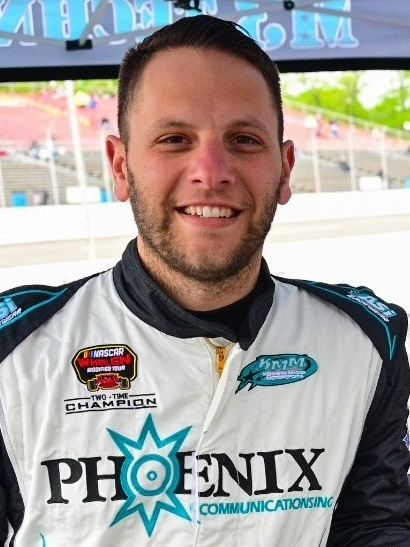
Justin Bonsignore finished third in the championship.

The 2014 NASCAR Whelen Modified Tour is the 30th season of the Whelen Modified Tour (WMT). It began with the UNOH Battle at the Beach at Daytona International Speedway on February 18, which did not count towards the championship. The first race for the championship was the Icebreaker 150 presented by Town Fair Tire at Thompson Speedway Motorsports Park on April 6. It ended with the Sunoco World Series 150 at Thompson again on October 19. Ryan Preece entered the season as the defending Drivers' Champion. 2012 champion Doug Coby won the 2014 championship after 13 races, 22 points ahead of Preece. Preece won the last race, which meant he went from sixth to second in the championship.

== Drivers ==
| No. | Manufacturer | Car Owner | Race Driver | Crew Chief(s) |
|---|---|---|---|---|
| 0 | Chevrolet | Joe Ambrose | Tom Rogers Jr.1 | TBA |
| 01 | Chevrolet | Kenneth Fifield | Melissa Fifield12 (R) | Kenneth Fifield |
| 1 | Chevrolet | Ed Marceau | Mike Stefanik4 | Ed Marceau |
| 2 | Chevrolet12 | Mike Smeriglio III | Doug Coby | Phil Moran |
| 2 | Ford1 | Mike Smeriglio III | Doug Coby | Phil Moran |
| 3 | Chevrolet | Jan Boehler | Jimmy Zacharias8 (R) | TBA |
| 3 | Chevrolet | Jan Boehler | Keith Rocco1 | TBA |
| 3 | Chevrolet | Jan Boehler | Max Zachem1 (R) | TBA |
| 3 | Chevrolet | Jan Boehler | Troy Talman1 (R) | TBA |
| 4 | Dodge | Robert Garbarino | Donny Lia | Dan Laferriere |
| 5 | Chevrolet | Jarod Zeltmann | Frank Vigliarolo1 | TBA |
| 5 | Chevrolet | Jarod Zeltmann | Dave Sapienza1 (R) | TBA |
| 6 | Chevrolet | Ed Partridge | Ron Silk | Ryan Stone |
| 07 | Chevrolet | Jennifer Emerling | Patrick Emerling | Jan Leaty/Don Ryerse |
| 7 | Chevrolet | Mike Curb | Ryan Newman3 | Gary Putnam |
| 8 | Chevrolet | Mark Sypher | Glen Reen | TBA |
| 12 | Chevrolet | Janet Our | Chuck Hossfeld1 | Brad Lafontaine |
| 13 | Chevrolet | Robert Katon Jr. | Ted Christopher | Robert Katon Jr. |
| 14 | Chevrolet | William Deakin | John Beatty Jr.3 (R) | Glenn Dixon |
| 15 | Chevrolet | Rob Fuller | Rob Fuller1 | Jeff DeMinck |
| 15 | Chevrolet | Rob Fuller | Todd Szegedy5 (Note: At the Bush's Beans 150 at Bristol, Todd Szegedy drove with a different number than normal: he drove car number 05, instead of his regular car number 15.) | Jeff DeMinck |
| 16 | Ford | Eric Sanderson | Ryan Preece | Sly Szaban |
| 17 | Chevrolet | John Ellwood Jr. | Kyle Ellwood2 | TBA |
| 18 | Ford5 | Robert Pollifrone | Ken Heagy10 | Greg Gorman |
| 18 | Chevrolet5 | Robert Pollifrone | Ken Heagy10 | Greg Gorman |
| 20 | Chevrolet | Barbara Park | Todd Szegedy1 | TBA |
| 20 | Chevrolet | Michael Grimaldi | Max Zachem1 (R) | TBA |
| 21 | Chevrolet | Joe Bertuccio Sr. | J. R. Bertuccio1 | TBA |
| 22 | Chevrolet | Christopher Our | Tommy Barrett Jr. (R) | Brad Lafontaine |
| 26 | Pontiac12 | Sean McDonald | Gary McDonald | Chad McDonald |
| 26 | Chevrolet1 | Sean McDonald | Gary McDonald | Chad McDonald |
| 29 | Pontiac | Sandra Hill | James Civali1 | TBA |
| 33 | Chevrolet | Beth Cole | Wade Cole | Rick Rodenbaugh |
| 35 | Chevrolet | Richard Ramstrom | Derek Ramstrom2 (R) | TBA |
| 36 | Chevrolet | Jarod Zeltmann | Frank Vigliarolo1 | TBA |
| 38 | Chevrolet | Linda Rodenbaugh | Dave Salzarulo11 (R) | TBA |
| 39 | Chevrolet | Rich Pallai | Richie Pallai Jr.2 | Rich Pallai |
| 43 | Chevrolet | Michael Calabrese | David Calabrese1 | TBA |
| 44 | Chevrolet | Mike Curb | Bobby Santos III | Steve Lemay |
| 48 | Chevrolet | John Rufrano | Keith Rocco6 | Junior Woods |
| 51 | Chevrolet | Ken Massa | Justin Bonsignore | Bill Michael |
| 52 | Chevrolet | Wayne Darling | Matt Hirschman12 | Frank Gasper/John McKenna |
| 52 | Chevrolet | Wayne Darling | Keith Rocco1 | Frank Gasper/John McKenna |
| 58 | Chevrolet | Edgar Goodale | Eric Goodale | Jason Shephard |
| 64 | Chevrolet | Mike Murphy | Ron Yuhas Jr.12 | P. J. Fearns |
| 64 | Chevrolet | Mike Murphy | Shawn Solomito1 (R) | P. J. Fearns |
| 69 | Chevrolet | Fred Bolk | Jason Agugliaro1 (R) | TBA |
| 70 | Chevrolet | Steve Seuss | Andy Seuss2 | TBA |
| 71 | Chevrolet | Terry Zacharias | T. J. Zacharias2 (R) | TBA |
| 71 | Chevrolet | Terry Zacharias | Craig Lutz1 (R) | TBA |
| 71 | Chevrolet | Terry Zacharias | Dave Brigati1 (R) | TBA |
| 73 | Chevrolet | Todd Powell | Cole Powell3 | Todd Powell |
| 75 | Chevrolet | Wayne Anderson | Timmy Solomito11 (R) | Jerry Solomito |
| 77 | Chevrolet | Mike Curb | Gary Putnam2 | Donald Tarantino |
| 79 | Pontiac | Susan Hill | Spencer Davis4 (R) | TBA |
| 82 | Chevrolet | Pamla Hulse | Danny Watts Jr.2 | TBA |
| 88 | Chevrolet | Buzz Chew | Woody Pitkat | Ronald Ste-Marie |
| 89 | Chevrolet | Jerry Solomito | Timmy Solomito2 (R) | Jerry Solomito/Ed Bennett III |
| 89 | Chevrolet | Jerry Solomito | Shawn Solomito3 (R) | Jerry Solomito/Ed Bennett III |
| 93 | Chevrolet | Mark Pennink | Rowan Pennink11 | Don Barker |
| 99 | Chevrolet | Brittany Tomaino | Jamie Tomaino | George Ratajczak |

== Schedule ==
The UNOH Battle at the Beach and the Whelen All-Star Shootout did not count towards the championship.

| No. | Race title | Track | Date | TV |
|---|---|---|---|---|
| | UNOH Battle at the Beach | Daytona International Speedway, Daytona Beach, Florida | February 18 | FS2 |
| 1 | Icebreaker 150 presented by Town Fair Tire | Thompson Speedway Motorsports Park, Thompson, Connecticut | April 6 | FansChoice.TV |
| 2 | NAPA Spring Sizzler 200 | Stafford Motor Speedway, Stafford, Connecticut | April 27 | |
| 3 | TSI Harley-Davidson 125 | Stafford Motor Speedway, Stafford, Connecticut | June 6 (Note: The TSI Harley-Davidson 125 was originally scheduled for May 23, but was postponed to May 30 due to heavy rain. The second attempt to run the race was also postponed for similar reasons, and was postponed to June 6.) | |
| 4 | Mr. Rooter 161 | Waterford Speedbowl, Waterford, Connecticut | June 21 | |
| 5 | Hoosier Tire 200 | Riverhead Raceway, Riverhead, New York | June 28 | |
| | Whelen All-Star Shootout | New Hampshire Motor Speedway, Loudon, New Hampshire | July 11 | FS1 |
| 6 | Sunoco 100 | New Hampshire Motor Speedway, Loudon, New Hampshire | July 12 | FS1 |
| 7 | O'Reilly Auto Parts 200 | Monadnock Speedway, Winchester, New Hampshire | July 19 | |
| 8 | Call Before You Dig 811 150 | Stafford Motor Speedway, Stafford, Connecticut | August 8 | |
| 9 | Budweiser King of Beers 150 | Thompson Speedway Motorsports Park, Thompson, Connecticut | August 13 | |
| 10 | Bush's Beans 150 (Note: The Bush's Beans 150 was held as a combined event, with competitors from the Whelen Modified Tour competing along with competitors for the Whelen Southern Modified Tour. The race was run with a series-based point distribution, where drivers received points and statistical credit for their finish relative to other drivers in their series, not to the whole field in general.) | Bristol Motor Speedway, Bristol, Tennessee | August 20 | FS1 |
| 11 | F. W. Webb 100 | New Hampshire Motor Speedway, Loudon, New Hampshire | September 20 | FS1 |
| 12 | NAPA Fall Final 150 | Stafford Motor Speedway, Stafford, Connecticut | September 28 | |
| 13 | Sunoco World Series 150 presented by Xtra Mart | Thompson Speedway Motorsports Park, Thompson, Connecticut | October 19 | FS1 |

Notes

- The Riverhead 200 was originally scheduled to be held at Riverhead Raceway on September 13, but the event was rained out. With the track unable to hold racing after September due to licensing regulations and the lack of an available weekend to hold racing, the event was not rescheduled.

== Results and standings ==
=== Races ===
| No. | Race | Pole position | Most laps led | Winning driver | Manufacturer |
|---|---|---|---|---|---|
| | UNOH Battle at the Beach | Ryan Preece | Ryan Preece | Doug Coby | Ford |
| 1 | Icebreaker 150 presented by Town Fair Tire | Woody Pitkat | Rowan Pennink | Justin Bonsignore | Chevrolet |
| 2 | NAPA Spring Sizzler 200 | Tommy Barrett Jr. | Bobby Santos III | Bobby Santos III | Chevrolet |
| 3 | TSI Harley-Davidson 125 | Bobby Santos III | Doug Coby | Doug Coby | Chevrolet |
| 4 | Mr. Rooter 161 | Donny Lia | Donny Lia | Bobby Santos III | Chevrolet |
| 5 | Hoosier Tire 200 | John Beatty Jr. | John Beatty Jr. | Eric Goodale | Chevrolet |
| | Whelen All-Star Shootout | J. R. Bertuccio^{1} | Ryan Newman/Ron Silk^{2} | Ryan Newman | Chevrolet |
| 6 | Sunoco 100 | Ron Silk | Ron Silk | Bobby Santos III | Chevrolet |
| 7 | O'Reilly Auto Parts 200 | Justin Bonsignore | Ryan Preece | Justin Bonsignore | Chevrolet |
| 8 | Call Before You Dig 811 150 | Bobby Santos III | Woody Pitkat | Woody Pitkat | Chevrolet |
| 9 | Budweiser King of Beers 150 | Donny Lia | Donny Lia | Justin Bonsignore | Chevrolet |
| 10 | Bush's Beans 150 | Justin Bonsignore | Bobby Santos III | Tommy Barrett Jr. | Chevrolet |
| 11 | F. W. Webb 100 | Ryan Newman | Woody Pitkat | Woody Pitkat | Chevrolet |
| 12 | NAPA Fall Final 150 | Bobby Santos III | Ryan Preece | Ryan Preece | Ford |
| 13 | Sunoco World Series 150 presented by Xtra Mart | Woody Pitkat | Ryan Preece | Ryan Preece | Ford |

Notes

- ^{1} – There was no qualifying session for the Whelen All-Star Shootout. The starting grid was decided with a random draw.
- ^{2} – Ryan Newman and Ron Silk both led 16 laps.

=== Drivers' championship ===
(key) Bold - Pole position awarded by time. Italics - Pole position set by final practice results or rainout. * – Most laps led.

| Pos | Driver | DAY‡ | THO | STA | STA | WAT | RIV | NHA‡ | NHA | MON | STA | THO | BRI | NHA | STA | THO | Points |
|---|---|---|---|---|---|---|---|---|---|---|---|---|---|---|---|---|---|
| 1 | Doug Coby | 1 | 3 | 2 | 1* | 10 | 6 | 12 | 2 | 5 | 4 | 3 | 4 | 3 | 8 | 17 | 511 |
| 2 | Ryan Preece | **4*** | 9 | 24 | 9 | 6 | 4 | 6 | 5 | 2* | 9 | 4 | 11 | 12 | 1* | 1* | 489 |
| 3 | Justin Bonsignore | 18 | 1 | 5 | 2 | 4 | 16 | 2 | 6 | **1** | 8 | 1 | **6** | 25 | 21 | 5 | 484 |
| 4 | Ron Silk | 8 | 7 | 10 | 6 | 19 | 7 | 4* | **9*** | 9 | 2 | 5 | 3 | 11 | 3 | 4 | 483 |
| 5 | Ted Christopher | | 8 | 6 | 8 | 3 | 2 | 9 | 3 | 8 | 7 | 7 | 22 | 4 | 2 | 20 | 480 |
| 6 | Bobby Santos III | | 18 | 1* | **3** | 1 | 10 | 5 | 1 | 11 | **12** | 25 | 2* | 8 | **12** | 28 | 458 |
| 7 | Eric Goodale | 9 | 5 | 14 | 11 | 25 | 1 | | 19 | 3 | 5 | 18 | 7 | 13 | 7 | 8 | 440 |
| 8 | Timmy Solomito **(R)** | 15 | 4 | 8 | 13 | 21 | 5 | | 11 | 13 | 11 | 6 | 8 | 17 | 13 | 10 | 433 |
| 9 | Woody Pitkat | | **2** | 4 | 5 | 7 | 20 | | 25 | 20 | 1* | 16 | 19 | 1* | 6 | **35** | 429 |
| 10 | Patrick Emerling | 12 | 17 | 12 | 7 | 5 | 15 | 16 | 20 | 7 | 19 | 20 | 9 | 6 | 5 | 11 | 419 |
| 11 | Donny Lia | 11 | 21 | 7 | 15 | **2*** | 21 | 17 | 18 | 18 | 3 | **22*** | 35 | 7 | 9 | 2 | 413 |
| 12 | Tommy Barrett Jr. **(R)** | 6 | 23 | **11** | 20 | 23 | 27 | | 7 | 4 | 15 | 23 | 1 | 9 | 4 | 12 | 400 |
| 13 | Matt Hirschman | | 11 | 9 | 14 | 24 | 3 | 15 | 12 | 6 | 10 | 2 | 23 | 26 | | 6 | 388 |
| 14 | Glen Reen | | 15 | 25 | 10 | 12 | 14 | 19 | 23 | 12 | 16 | 9 | 21 | 21 | 11 | 18 | 372 |
| 15 | Jamie Tomaino | 13 | 14 | 13 | 21 | 11 | 13 | 20 | 14 | 19 | 18 | 13 | 26 | 22 | 14 | 13 | 369 |
| 16 | Rowan Pennink | | 22* | 3 | 4 | 16 | 22 | 14 | 17 | | 6 | 21 | | 5 | 10 | 3 | 359 |
| 17 | Wade Cole | | 16 | 15 | 19 | 15 | 18 | | 15 | 21 | 21 | 15 | 37 | 23 | 18 | 16 | 338 |
| 18 | Gary McDonald | | DNQ^{1} | 17 | 18 | 18 | 25 | | 21 | 15 | 20 | 12 | 33 | 14 | 17 | 31 | 318 |
| 19 | Ron Yuhas Jr. | | 6 | 16 | 12 | 9 | 23 | | 27 | 10 | 17 | 19 | 12 | 18 | | | 315 |
| 20 | Dave Salzarulo **(R)** | | DNQ^{1} | 18 | 17 | 13 | 29 | | 16 | 16 | 23 | | | 15 | 19 | 25 | 267 |
| 21 | Melissa Fifield **(R)** | | 19 | 20 | 22 | 27 | 30 | | 29 | 23 | 22 | 24 | | 19 | 20 | 22 | 251 |
| 22 | Ken Heagy | | 12 | 21 | 23 | 14 | 11 | 18 | 26 | 14 | | | | 27 | 16 | 30 | 246 |
| 23 | Jimmy Zacharias **(R)** | 24 | 10 | 22 | | 17 | 17 | | 13 | 22 | | 14 | 10 | | | | 227 |
| 24 | Keith Rocco | | 20 | 26 | 24 | 8 | | | | | 13 | 11 | | | 15 | 33 | 202 |
| 25 | Todd Szegedy | | | | | | 28 | 8 | 22 | | | 8 | 34 | 2 | | 24 | 162 |
| 26 | Spencer Davis **(R)** | | | | | 26 | | | 28 | | | 10 | 18^{2} | | | 7 | 105 |
| 27 | Ryan Newman | | | | | | | 1* | 4 | | | | 5 | **20** | | | 103 |
| 28 | Mike Stefanik | | 24 | | | | | 3 | 30 | | 14 | | | 10 | | | 98 |
| 29 | Shawn Solomito **(R)** | | | | 16 | 22 | 9 | | | | | | | | | 36 | 93 |
| 30 | John Beatty Jr. **(R)** | 14 | | | | | **12*** | | | | | 17 | | | | 15 | 90 |
| 31 | Cole Powell | 19 | | | | | | 11 | DNQ^{1} | | | | 17 | 24 | | | 64 |
| 32 | Andy Seuss | | | | | | | 13 | 8 | 17 | | | 27^{2} | | | | 63 |
| 33 | Max Zachem **(R)** | | | | | | | | | | | | | | 22 | 9 | 57 |
| 34 | Danny Watts Jr. | | | | | | | | | | | | | 16 | | 23 | 49 |
| 35 | T. J. Zacharias **(R)** | | 25 | 19 | | | | | | | | | | | | | 44 |
| 36 | Kyle Ellwood **(R)** | | | | | | 26 | | | | | | | | | 19 | 43 |
| 37 | Derek Ramstrom **(R)** | | | | | 20 | | | | | | | | | | 27 | 41 |
| 38 | Tom Rogers Jr. | | | | | | 8 | | | | | | | | | | 36 |
| 39 | Richie Pallai Jr. | | | 27 | DNQ^{1} | | | | | | | | | | | | 36 |
| 40 | Chuck Hossfeld | | | | | | | 7 | 10 | | | | | | | | 34 |
| 41 | Rob Fuller | 16 | 13 | | | | | | | | | | | | | | 31 |
| 42 | David Calabrese | | | | | | | | | | | | 24^{2} | | | 14 | 30 |
| 43 | Frank Vigliarolo | | | | | | 24 | | | | | | | | | 34 | 30 |
| 44 | Dave Brigati | 26 | | | | | 19 | | | | | | | | | | 25 |
| 45 | Troy Talman **(R)** | | | | | | | | | | | | | | | 21 | 23 |
| 46 | Gary Putnam | | | 23 | | | | | | | | | 29^{2} | | | | 21 |
| 47 | J. R. Bertuccio | 10 | | | | | | 10 | 24 | | | | 13^{2} | | | | 20 |
| 48 | James Civali | | | | | | | | | | | | | | | 26 | 18 |
| 49 | Craig Lutz **(R)** | | | | | 28 | | | | | | | | | | | 16 |
| 50 | Dave Sapienza **(R)** | 17 | | | | | | | | | | | | | | 29 | 15 |
| 51 | Jason Agugliaro **(R)** | | | | | | | | | | | | | | | 32 | 12 |
Drivers ineligible for NWMT points, because they only drove the non-championship rounds
| | Cody Ware **(R)** | 7 | | | | | | | | | | | | | | | |
| | Kyle Benjamin **(R)** | 20 | | | | | | | | | | | | | | | |
| | Dalton Baldwin **(R)** | 21 | | | | | | | | | | | | | | | |
| | A. J. Winstead | 22 | | | | | | | | | | | | | | | |
| | Johnny Kievman | 25 | | | | | | | | | | | | | | | |
Drivers ineligible for NWMT points, because at the combined event at Bristol they chose to drive for NWSMT points
| | George Brunnhoelzl III | | | | | | | | | | | | 14 | | | | |
| | Burt Myers | 5 | | | | | | | | | | | 15 | | | | |
| | Luke Fleming | 3 | | | | | | | | | | | 16 | | | | |
| | Danny Bohn | | | | | | | | | | | | 20 | | | | |
| | Joe Ryan Osborne **(R)** | | | | | | | | | | | | 25 | | | | |
| | Bryan Dauzat | | | | | | | | | | | | 28 | | | | |
| | Jeff Fultz | | | | | | | | | | | | 30 | | | | |
| | Bobby Measmer Jr. **(R)** | | | | | | | | | | | | 31 | | | | |
| | Cale Gale | | | | | | | | | | | | 32 | | | | |
| | Kyle Ebersole | | | | | | | | | | | | 36 | | | | |
| | Jeremy Gerstner | 23 | | | | | | | | | | | 38 | | | | |
| | Jason Myers | 2 | | | | | | | | | | | 39 | | | | |
| Pos | Driver | DAY‡ | THO | STA | STA | WAT | RIV | NHA‡ | NHA | MON | STA | THO | BRI | NHA | STA | THO | Points |

Notes

- ^{‡} – Non-championship round
- ^{1} – Dave Salzarulo, Gary McDonald, Richie Pallai Jr. and Cole Powell received championship points, despite the fact that the driver did not qualify for the race.
- ^{2} – Scored points towards the Whelen Southern Modified Tour.

== See also ==
- 2014 NASCAR Sprint Cup Series
- 2014 NASCAR Nationwide Series
- 2014 NASCAR Camping World Truck Series
- 2014 NASCAR K&N Pro Series East
- 2014 NASCAR K&N Pro Series West
- 2014 NASCAR Whelen Southern Modified Tour
- 2014 NASCAR Canadian Tire Series
- 2014 NASCAR Toyota Series
- 2014 NASCAR Whelen Euro Series
