= 2013 NASCAR Whelen Modified Tour =

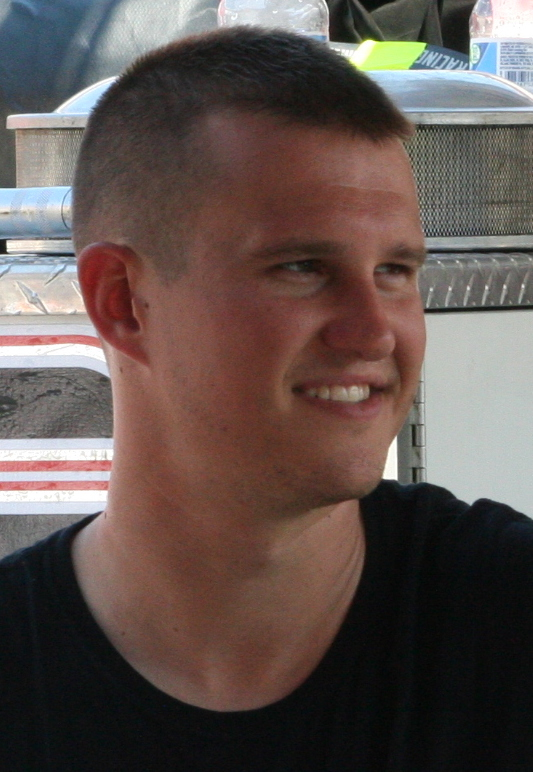
Ryan Preece won the championship by 32 points.

The 2013 NASCAR Whelen Modified Tour was the 29th season of the Whelen Modified Tour (WMT). It began with the UNOH Battle at the Beach at Daytona International Speedway on February 19, which did not count towards the championship. The first race for the championship was the Icebreaker 150 presented by Town Fair Tire at Thompson Speedway Motorsports Park on April 14. It ended with the Sunoco World Series 150 at Thompson again on October 19. Doug Coby entered the season as the defending Drivers' Champion. Ryan Preece won the 2013 championship after 14 races, 32 points ahead of Coby.

== Schedule ==
The UNOH Battle at the Beach did not count towards the championship.

No.	Race title	Track	Date
	UNOH Battle at the Beach	Daytona International Speedway, Daytona Beach, Florida	February 19
1	Icebreaker 150 presented by Town Fair Tire	Thompson Speedway Motorsports Park, Thompson, Connecticut	April 14
2	CarQuest Tech-Net Sizzler 200	Stafford Motor Speedway, Stafford, Connecticut	April 28
3	TSI Harley-Davidson 125	Stafford Motor Speedway, Stafford, Connecticut	June 14
4	Mr. Rooter 161	Waterford Speedbowl, Waterford, Connecticut	June 22
5	Hoosier Tire 200	Riverhead Raceway, Riverhead, New York	June 29
6	Town Fair Tire 100	New Hampshire Motor Speedway, Loudon, New Hampshire	July 13
7	Town Fair Tire Whitcomb 200	Monadnock Speedway, Winchester, New Hampshire	July 27
8	CarQuest 150	Stafford Motor Speedway, Stafford, Connecticut	August 2
9	Budweiser King of Beers 150	Thompson Speedway Motorsports Park, Thompson, Connecticut	August 15
10	Titan Roof 150 (Note: The Titan Roof 150 was held as a combined event, with competitors from the Whelen Modified Tour competing along with competitors for the Whelen Southern Modified Tour. The race was run with a series-based point distribution, where drivers received points and statistical credit for their finish relative to other drivers in their series, not to the whole field in general.)	Bristol Motor Speedway, Bristol, Tennessee	August 21
11	Green Earth Technologies 200	Riverhead Raceway, Riverhead, New York	September 14
12	F. W. Webb 100	New Hampshire Motor Speedway, Loudon, New Hampshire	September 21
13	NAPA Fall Final 150	Stafford Motor Speedway, Stafford, Connecticut	September 29
14	Sunoco World Series 150	Thompson Speedway Motorsports Park, Thompson, Connecticut	October 20

== Results and standings ==
=== Races ===
No.	Race	Pole position	Most laps led	Winning driver	Manufacturer
	UNOH Battle at the Beach	Todd Szegedy	Todd Szegedy	Steve Park	Ford
1	Icebreaker 150 presented by Town Fair Tire	Mike Stefanik	Rowan Pennink	Mike Stefanik	Ford
2	CarQuest Tech-Net Sizzler 200	Bobby Santos III	Bobby Santos III	Bobby Santos III	Chevrolet
3	TSI Harley-Davidson 125	Bobby Santos III	Ron Silk	Ryan Preece	Ford
4	Mr. Rooter 161	Todd Szegedy	Todd Szegedy	Ryan Preece	Ford
5	Hoosier Tire 200	Ron Silk	Ryan Preece	Ryan Preece	Ford
6	Town Fair Tire 100	Jimmy Blewett	Ted Christopher	Doug Coby	Chevrolet
7	Town Fair Tire Whitcomb 200	Eric Goodale	Justin Bonsignore	Justin Bonsignore	Chevrolet
8	CarQuest 150	Bobby Santos III	Doug Coby	Doug Coby	Chevrolet
9	Budweiser King of Beers 150	Bobby Santos III	Bobby Santos III	Bobby Santos III	Chevrolet
10	Titan Roof 150	Donny Lia	Donny Lia	Mike Stefanik	Ford
11	Green Earth Technologies 200	Timmy Solomito	Timmy Solomito	Ryan Preece	Ford
12	F. W. Webb 100	Ryan Newman	Ryan Newman	Todd Szegedy	Chevy
13	NAPA Fall Final 150	Donny Lia	Donny Lia	Donny Lia	Dodge
14	Sunoco World Series 150	Bobby Santos III	Bobby Santos III	Rowan Pennink	Chevrolet

=== Drivers' championship ===
(key) Bold - Pole position awarded by time. Italics - Pole position set by final practice results or rainout. * – Most laps led.

Pos	Driver	DAY‡	THO	STA	STA	WAT	RIV	NHA	MON	STA	THO	BRI	RIV	NHA	STA	THO	Points
1	Ryan Preece	26	3	4	1	1	1*	3	5	16	13	4	1	12	17	3	549
2	Doug Coby	4	7	6	6	2	28	1	2	1*	4	23	14	13	2	8	517
3	Donny Lia	23	23	10	4	3	15	19	15	2	2	**30***	11	3	**1***	2	496
4	Rowan Pennink		2*	5	3	8	11	15	3	13	18	33	7	25	3	1	487
5	Mike Stefanik	13	**1**	9	8	11	5	22	14	8	11	1	26	6	6	16	480
6	Todd Szegedy	**21***	16	18	13	**6***	19	14	16	11	9	2	9	1	4	9	477
7	Ron Silk	11	4	17	2*	9	**20**	30	6	5	6	12	22	8	10	5	466
8	Justin Bonsignore	6	8	2	7	4	24	32	1*	15	20	8	2	14	5	10	464
9	Woody Pitkat	12	11	26	10	22	6	6	9	7	5	6	4	9	24	14	457
10	Ted Christopher	3	5	3	14	23	18	2*	11	3	22	17	8	24	7	23	445
11	Eric Goodale	2	12	20	23	7	2	25	**20**	6	3	7	6	7	18	26	435
12	Ron Yuhas Jr.		27	7	11	15	21	18	13	10	10	3	16	17	11	13	424
13	Bobby Santos III	24	18	**1***	**5**	5		24		**4**	**1***	32	25	4	9	**4***	421
14	Jamie Tomaino	29	17	12	17	25	13	10	22	17	8	22	13	18	14	19	397
15	Ken Heagy	9	15	13	26	18	7	13	21	23	24	18	20	20	12	24	368
16	Cole Powell	8	19	19	20	13	14	11	12	9	16	31	28	15	23	29	368
17	Bryon Chew		25	22	12	10	9	26	4	20	26	36	21	11	13	27	367
18	Ed Flemke Jr.		14	16	22	21	10	28	17	25	12	21	17	10	21	25	365
19	Eric Berndt		29	14	16	14	16	7	10	18	14	24	27	26	20		345
20	Wade Cole		26	21	19	20	17	17	23	21	15	26	15	23	22	22	338
21	Patrick Emerling	5	13	11	24	17	26	20	19	14		DNQ	10	5	19		327
22	Gary McDonald		24	23	18	19	22	31	18	24	19		19	22	15		274
23	Richie Pallai Jr.		22	15	21	26		9	8	12	21			16	25		265
24	Jimmy Blewett		6	8	9	12		**21**			7						201
25	Chuck Hossfeld		9	25				8				11			8	12	193
26	Timmy Solomito		10		27		23			19			**3***			11	173
27	Brian Schofield		20	24	25	24		16		22	27						150
28	Ryan Newman							5				5		**2***			122
29	Rob Fuller		28					23			25	28		21		28	121
30	John Beatty Jr.						3				17		24			20	113
31	Shawn Solomito					16	4						12				100
32	Andy Seuss	31						4	7			25^{1}					77
33	Glen Reen										23		18			17	74
34	Matt Hirschman	28					12									7	70
35	Frank Vigliarolo Jr.						8						23				57
36	Jacob Dore							12						19			57
37	Dave Salzarulo														16	21	51
38	Jimmy Zacharias	33	21									10^{1}				18	49
39	Howie Brode												5				39
40	Max Zachem															6	38
41	Dave Brigati	32					25										41
42	Zane Zeiner				15												29
43	Keith Rocco															15	29
44	Renee Dupuis									26							18
45	Rob Summers					27											17
46	David Roys						27										17
47	Bryan Dauzat	18						27				19^{1}					17
48	Kyle Ebersole							29				13^{1}					15
	Jeff Fultz											DNQ					
	Dalton Baldwin	10										DNQ					
Drivers ineligible for NWMT points, because they only drove the non-championship rounds
	Brian Loftin	7															
	Kyle Larson	16															
	Gary Fountain Sr.	17															
	Danny Bohn	25															
	Brandon Ward	30															
Drivers ineligible for NWMT points, because at the combined event at Bristol they chose to drive for NWSMT points
	Burt Myers	15										9					
	George Brunnhoelzl III											14					
	John Smith	27										15					
	Tim Brown											16					
	Gary Putnam											20					
	Jeremy Gerstner	22										27					
	Luke Fleming	19										29					
	Jason Myers	20										34					
	J. R. Bertuccio	14										35					
	Steve Park	1										DNQ					
	David Calabrese											DNQ					
Pos	Driver	DAY‡	THO	STA	STA	WAT	RIV	NHA	MON	STA	THO	BRI	RIV	NHA	STA	THO	Points

Notes

- ^{‡} – Non-championship round
- ^{1} – Scored points towards the Whelen Southern Modified Tour.

== See also ==
- 2013 NASCAR Sprint Cup Series
- 2013 NASCAR Nationwide Series
- 2013 NASCAR Camping World Truck Series
- 2013 ARCA Racing Series
- 2013 NASCAR K&N Pro Series East
- 2013 NASCAR K&N Pro Series West
- 2013 NASCAR Whelen Southern Modified Tour
- 2013 NASCAR Canadian Tire Series
- 2013 NASCAR Toyota Series
- 2013 NASCAR Whelen Euro Series
