= 2012 NASCAR Whelen Modified Tour =

The 2012 NASCAR Whelen Modified Tour was the 28th season of the Whelen Modified Tour (WMT). It began with the Icebreaker 150 at Thompson Speedway Motorsports Park on April 15. It ended with the Sunoco World Series 150 at Thompson again on October 14. Ron Silk entered the season as the defending Drivers' Champion. Doug Coby won the 2012 championship after 14 races, 11 points ahead of Ryan Preece.

== Schedule ==
No.	Race title	Track	Date
1	Icebreaker 150	Thompson Speedway Motorsports Park, Thompson, Connecticut	April 15
2	CarQuest Tech-Net Sizzler 200	Stafford Motor Speedway, Stafford, Connecticut	April 29
3	Whitcomb 200 Pres. by Mobix & Town Fair Tire	Monadnock Speedway, Winchester, New Hampshire	May 12
4	TSI Harley-Davidson 125	Stafford Motor Speedway, Stafford, Connecticut	May 25
5	Mr. Rooter 161	Waterford Speedbowl, Waterford, Connecticut	June 23
6	Town Fair Tire 100	New Hampshire Motor Speedway, Loudon, New Hampshire	July 14
7	Stafford 150	Stafford Motor Speedway, Stafford, Connecticut	August 3
8	Budweiser King of Beers 150	Thompson Speedway Motorsports Park, Thompson, Connecticut	August 9
9	UNOH Perfect Storm 150 (Note: The UNOH Perfect Storm 150 was held as a combined event, with competitors from the Whelen Modified Tour competing along with competitors for the Whelen Southern Modified Tour. The race was run with a series-based point distribution, where drivers received points and statistical credit for their finish relative to other drivers in their series, not to the whole field in general.)	Bristol Motor Speedway, Bristol, Tennessee	August 22
10	Town Fair Tire 75	Thompson Speedway Motorsports Park, Thompson, Connecticut	September 9
11	Riverhead 200	Riverhead Raceway, Riverhead, New York	September 15
12	F. W. Webb 100	New Hampshire Motor Speedway, Loudon, New Hampshire	September 22
13	CarQuest Fall Final	Stafford Motor Speedway, Stafford, Connecticut	September 29
14	Sunoco-Town Fair Tire World Series 150	Thompson Speedway Motorsports Park, Thompson, Connecticut	October 14

== Results and standings ==
=== Races ===
No.	Race	Pole position	Most laps led	Winning driver	Manufacturer
1	Icebreaker 150 presented by Town Fair Tire	Ryan Preece	Ryan Preece	Ron Silk	Chevrolet
2	CarQuest Tech-Net Sizzler 200	Ryan Preece	Ryan Preece	Doug Coby	Chevrolet
3	Whitcomb 200 Pres. by Mobix & Town Fair Tire	Ryan Preece	Ryan Preece	Ryan Preece	Ford
4	TSI Harley-Davidson 125	Bobby Santos III	Bobby Santos III	Doug Coby	Chevrolet
5	Mr. Rooter 161	Ted Christopher	Doug Coby	Doug Coby	Chevrolet
6	Town Fair Tire 100	Ron Silk	Ron Silk	Mike Stefanik	Ford
7	Stafford 150	Ryan Preece	Doug Coby	Doug Coby	Chevrolet
8	Budweiser King of Beers 150	Mike Stefanik	Mike Stefanik	Donny Lia	Dodge
9	UNOH Perfect Storm 150	Ron Silk	Todd Szegedy	Ron Silk	Chevrolet
10	Town Fair Tire 75	Ryan Preece	Ryan Preece	Justin Bonsignore	Chevrolet
11	Riverhead 200	Ryan Preece	Ryan Preece	Ryan Preece	Ford
12	F. W. Webb 100	Donny Lia	Donny Lia	Doug Coby	Chevrolet
13	CarQuest Fall Final	Jimmy Blewett	Woody Pitkat	Bobby Santos III	Chevrolet
14	Sunoco-Town Fair Tire World Series 150	Eric Berndt	Ryan Preece	Bobby Santos III	Chevrolet

=== Drivers' championship ===
(key) Bold - Pole position awarded by time. Italics - Pole position set by final practice results or rainout. * – Most laps led.

Pos	Driver	THO	STA	MON	STA	WAT	NHA	STA	THO	BRI	THO	RIV	NHA	STA	THO	Points
1	Doug Coby	8	1	2	1	1*	3	1*	3	17	13	22	1	9	6	556
2	Ryan Preece	**16***	**2***	**1****	11	3	12	**6**	17	3	**3***	**1***	10	5	2*	545
3	Ron Silk	1	4	5	3	11	**2***	22	2	**1**	18	9	3	4	11	533
4	Donny Lia	5	14	6	20	5	8	16	1	23	7	8	**2***	7	18	493
5	Todd Szegedy	27	12	3	4	19	5	3	10	2*	4	3	26	23	3	476
6	Eric Beers	21	24	8	13	7	4	4	11	21	8	11	6	13	5	469
7	Justin Bonsignore	13	6	4	10	2	28	10	25	4	1	2	25	11	19	460
8	Jimmy Blewett	4	5	13	9	13	16	2	7	24	20	12	23	**3**	16	459
9	Ted Christopher	2	22	12	7	**9**	29	5	4	26	5	5	17	20	13	452
10	Ron Yuhas Jr.	18	7	16	12	4	25	11	9	5	14	18	9	12	17	439
11	Mike Stefanik	3	9	7	26	22	1	19	**5***	33	6		29	6	4	421
12	Rowan Pennink	10	13		5	6	6	12	6	34	19	14	5	15	29	412
13	Eric Berndt	24	15	21	15	12	15	20	19	18	9	10	11	21	**15**	399
14	Patrick Emerling	7	20	20	17	21	13	13	12	25	15	20	12	25	8	398
15	Ed Flemke Jr.	11	17	9	14	20	18	18	20	27	21	17	13	18	22	380
16	Jamie Tomaino	6	19	11	25	16	34	21	13	16	12	19	15	16	20	379
17	Eric Goodale	23	18	24	16	24	21	9	24	13	11	7	18	17	23	374
18	Bryon Chew	19	10	17	19	14	14	24	21	15	17		22	8	14	364
19	Wade Cole	9	26	25	23	15	19	15	23	31	16	15	19	22	21	349
20	Bobby Santos III	17			**2***		11	27	8		2		28	1	1	310
21	Woody Pitkat	15	8		8		10	8	22				14	2*	10	301
22	Ken Heagy	28	21	15	21	18	31	17	16	8	24	23	27		27	298
23	Jon McKennedy			23	18	10	26	7	14	12	22	21				248
24	Keith Rocco	22	3	10	6	8	22							26	9	246
25	Richie Pallai Jr.	14	16		24		27	26			10		7	14		214
26	Johnny Bush					17	20	14	18				21		25	149
27	Gary McDonald		25	19	22	23	24	25								126
28	Rob Fuller	25					17		15				31		26	106
29	Andy Seuss			14			7			28^{1}			24		32	99
30	Steve Dickey						23						30	24	28	71
31	Matt Hirschman												8	10		70
32	Tom Rogers Jr.											6			12	70
33	Tommy Barrett Jr.													19	7	62
34	Kevin Goodale	12	28												30	62
35	Daniel Hemric	20	11													57
36	Ryan Newman						30			19^{1}			4			54
37	Cole Powell									22^{1}			16		31	41
38	Howie Brode											4				40
39	Mike Christopher						32						20			36
40	John Jensen	29	23													36
41	Zane Zeiner						9									35
42	Frank Vigliarolo Jr.											13				31
43	Eddie Brunnhoelzl III											16				28
44	Renee Dupuis			18												26
45	Jerry Marquis			22												22
46	Steve Masse							23								21
47	Brian Schofield										23					21
48	Shawn Solomito														24	20
49	Tony Ferrante Jr.	26														18
50	Kyle Spencer			26												18
51	Corey LaJoie		27													17
52	Ryan Blaney						33									11
	Carl Long									DNQ						
Drivers ineligible for NWMT points, because at the combined event at Bristol they chose to drive for NWSMT points
	George Brunnhoelzl III									6						
	Danny Bohn									7						
	Thomas Stinson									9						
	Mike Speeney									10						
	Jonathan Kievman									11						
	Kyle Ebersole									14						
	Jason Myers									20						
	Frank Fleming									29						
	Gary Fountain Sr.									30						
	Burt Myers									32						
	John Smith									35						
	Tim Brown									36						
	Joe Scarbrough									DNQ						
	Bryan Dauzat									DNQ						
Pos	Driver	THO	STA	MON	STA	WAT	NHA	STA	THO	BRI	THO	RIV	NHA	STA	THO	Points

Notes

- ^{1} – Scored points towards the Whelen Southern Modified Tour.

== See also ==
- 2012 NASCAR Sprint Cup Series
- 2012 NASCAR Nationwide Series
- 2012 NASCAR Camping World Truck Series
- 2012 ARCA Racing Series
- 2012 NASCAR K&N Pro Series East
- 2012 NASCAR Whelen Southern Modified Tour
- 2012 NASCAR Canadian Tire Series
- 2012 NASCAR Toyota Series
- 2012 NASCAR Whelen Euro Series
