= Mike Norman =

American racing driver

- Nationality: American
- Born: March 29, 1958 (age 68) Fayetteville, Tennessee, U.S.

NASCAR Whelen Southern Modified Tour career
- Debut season: 2009
- Years active: 2009–2015
- Starts: 58
- Championships: 0
- Wins: 0
- Poles: 0
- Best finish: 11th in 2011
- Statistics up to date as of October 24, 2024.

Mike Norman (born March 29, 1958) is an American professional stock car racing driver who competed in the now defunct NASCAR Whelen Southern Modified Tour from 2009 to 2015. He is the father of Cody Norman, a competitor in 602 and Tour Type modifieds.

Norman previously competed in series such as the SMART Modified Tour, the Southern Modified Racing Series, the Southern Modified Race Tour, the ASA Southern Modified Race Tour, and the Carolina Crate Modified Series.

== Motorsports results ==
=== NASCAR ===
(key) (Bold – Pole position awarded by qualifying time. Italics – Pole position earned by points standings or practice time. * – Most laps led.)

==== Whelen Southern Modified Tour ====
NASCAR Whelen Southern Modified Tour results
Year	Car owner	No.	Make	1	2	3	4	5	6	7	8	9	10	11	12	13	14	NWSMTC	Pts	Ref
2009	Gary Myers	12	Ford	CON	SBO	CRW	LAN	CRW	BGS	BRI	CRW	MBS	CRW	CRW; 15	MAR	ACE; 10	CRW	30th	252	
2010	Gary Myers	12	Ford	ATL; 18	CRW; 19	SBO; 19	CRW; 18	BGS; 16	BRI	CRW; 20	LGY	TRI; 16	CLT; 14					14th	884	
2011	Gary Myers	12	Chevy	CRW; 20		SBO; 17												11th	1336	
2011	Gary Myers	12	Ford		HCY; 11		CRW; 20	CRW; 11	BGS; 6	BRI	CRW	LGY; 11	THO	TRI; 16	CRW; DNQ	CLT; 17	CRW; 11	11th	1336	
2012	Mike Norman	12	Chevy	CRW; 20			CRW; 18											17th	221	
2012	Mike Norman	12	Ford		CRW; 16	SBO; 17		CRW; 20	BGS; 8	BRI	LGY; 14	THO	CRW; DNQ	CLT				17th	221	
2013	Mike Norman	12	Ford	CRW; 12	SNM; 19													15th	326	
2013	Mike Norman	12	Chevy			SBO; 17	CRW; 17	CRW; 10	BGS; 15	BRI	LGY; 19	CRW; 14	CRW; 10	SNM; 12	CLT; 13			15th	326	
2014	Mike Norman	12	Chevy	CRW; 16	SNM; 13	SBO; 12	LGY; 13	CRW; 14	BGS; 18	BRI	LGY; 16	CRW; 11	SBO; 12	SNM; 15	CRW; 15	CRW; 9	CLT; 8	14th	400	
2015	Mike Norman	12	Chevy	CRW; 17	CRW; 15	SBO; 19	LGY	CRW	BGS; 13	BRI	LGY; 14	SBO	CLT; 17					16th	169	

=== SMART Modified Tour ===
SMART Modified Tour results
Year	Car owner	No.	Make	1	2	3	4	5	6	7	8	9	10	11	12	SMTC	Pts	Ref
2021	Mike Norman	12	N/A	CRW; 19	FLO; 13	SBO	FCS	CRW; 13	DIL	CAR	CRW; 12	DOM	PUL; 10	HCY; 18		16th	101	
2021	Mike Norman	12N	N/A												ACE; 8	16th	101	
