= Richie Pallai Jr. =

American racing driver

- Nationality: American
- Born: January 12, 1990 (age 36) Yorktown Heights, New York, U.S.

NASCAR Whelen Modified Tour career
- Debut season: 2009
- Years active: 2009–2014
- Starts: 46
- Championships: 0
- Wins: 0
- Poles: 0
- Best finish: 12th in 2010
- Statistics up to date as of August 20, 2024.

Richie Pallai Jr. (born January 12, 1990) is an American former professional stock car racing driver who competed in the NASCAR Whelen Modified Tour from 2009 to 2014.

Pallai Jr. has also previously competed in the SMART Modified Tour, the now defunct NASCAR Whelen Southern Modified Tour, the Modified Racing Series, and the World Series of Asphalt Stock Car Racing.

== Motorsports results ==
=== NASCAR ===
(key) (Bold – Pole position awarded by qualifying time. Italics – Pole position earned by points standings or practice time. * – Most laps led.)

==== Whelen Modified Tour ====
NASCAR Whelen Modified Tour results
Year	Team	No.	Make	1	2	3	4	5	6	7	8	9	10	11	12	13	14	15	16	NWMTC	Pts	Ref
2009	Rich Pallai	39	Chevy	TMP	STA	STA; DNQ	NHA	SPE	RIV	STA	BRI	TMP	NHA	MAR	STA; 17	TMP				44th	179	
2010	Rich Pallai	39	Chevy	TMP; 21	STA; 12	STA; 16	MAR; 9	NHA; 14	LIM; 23	MND; 23	RIV; 23	STA; 11	TMP; 14	BRI; 21	NHA; 10	STA; 23	TMP; 11			12th	1592	
2011	Rich Pallai	39	Chevy	TMP; 19	STA; 21	STA; 14	MND; 21	TMP; 16	NHA; 21	RIV; 10	STA; 21	NHA; 18	BRI	DEL	TMP	LRP; 4	NHA; 25	STA; 13	TMP	20th	1357	
2012	Rich Pallai	39	Chevy	TMP; 14	STA; 16	MND	STA; 24	WFD	NHA; 27	STA; 26	TMP	BRI	TMP; 10	RIV	NHA; 7	STA; 14	TMP			25th	214	
2013	Rich Pallai	39	Chevy	TMP; 22	STA; 15	STA; 21	WFD; 26	RIV	NHA; 9	MND; 8	STA; 12	TMP; 21	BRI	RIV	NHA; 16	STA; 25	TMP			23rd	265	
2014	Rich Pallai	39	Chevy	TMP	STA; 27	STA; Wth	WFD	RIV	NHA	MND	STA	TMP	BRI	NHA	STA	TMP				39th	36	

==== Whelen Southern Modified Tour ====
NASCAR Whelen Southern Modified Tour results
Year	Car owner	No.	Make	1	2	3	4	5	6	7	8	9	10	11	NSWMTC	Pts	Ref
2016	Hill Enterprises	79	Pontiac	CRW; 9	CON; 14	SBO; 10	CRW; 12	CRW	BGS	BRI	ECA	SBO	CRW	CLT	16th	131	
