= Keith Rocco (racing driver) =

American racing driver

- Born: January 3, 1985 (age 41) Wallingford, Connecticut, U.S.

NASCAR Whelen Modified Tour career
- Debut season: 2008
- Years active: 2008–2009, 2011–2015
- Starts: 30
- Championships: 0
- Wins: 0
- Poles: 0
- Best finish: 23rd in 2015
- Statistics up to date as of August 2, 2024.

Keith Rocco (born January 3, 1985) is an American professional stock car racing driver who competed in the NASCAR Whelen Modified Tour from 2008 to 2015. He was the 2010 NASCAR Advance Auto Parts Weekly Series National champion. Rocco is known as one of the most successful weekly drivers of all time, garnering multiple track championships across all three Connecticut tracks in multiple types of race cars, including Modifieds and late models. His father Ronnie Rocco was a successful modified driver, and is the twin brother to Jeff Rocco, who also races.

Rocco has previously competed in series such as the ARCA Menards Series West, the ACT Late Model Tour, the Race of Champions Asphalt Modified Tour, the PASS North Super Late Model Series, the Modified Racing Series, the Tri-Track Open Modified Series, and the World Series of Asphalt Stock Car Racing.

== Motorsports results ==
=== NASCAR ===
(key) (Bold – Pole position awarded by qualifying time. Italics – Pole position earned by points standings or practice time. * – Most laps led.)

==== Whelen Modified Tour ====
NASCAR Whelen Modified Tour results
Year	Car owner	No.	Make	1	2	3	4	5	6	7	8	9	10	11	12	13	14	15	16	NWMTC	Pts	Ref
2008	Joe Brady	00	Chevy	TMP	STA	STA	TMP	NHA	SPE	RIV	STA	TMP	MAN	TMP	NHA	MAR	CHE	STA	TMP; 19	54th	106	
2009	Ed Partridge	12	Chevy	TMP	STA	STA	NHA	SPE	RIV	STA	BRI	TMP; 5	NHA; 33	MAR	STA; 26	TMP				37th	304	
2011	Mark Pane	57	Chevy	TMP	STA	STA	MND	TMP	NHA	RIV	STA	NHA	BRI	DEL	TMP	LRP	NHA	STA	TMP; 6	40th	150	
2012	Boehler Racing Enterprises	3	Chevy	TMP; 22	STA; 3	MND; 10	STA; 6	WFD; 8	NHA; 22	STA	TMP	BRI	TMP	RIV	NHA		TMP; 9			24th	246	
2012	John Lukosavage	11	Ford													STA; 26				24th	246	
2013	Robert Katon Jr.	46	Chevy	TMP	STA	STA	WFD	RIV	NHA	MND	STA	TMP	BRI	RIV	NHA	STA	TMP; 15			43rd	29	
2014	John Rufano	48	Chevy	TMP; 20	STA; 26	STA; 24	WFD; 8	RIV	NHA	MND		TMP; 11	BRI	NHA		TMP; 33				24th	202	
2014	Boehler Racing Enterprises	3	Chevy								STA; 13									24th	202	
2014	Wayne Darling	52	Chevy												STA; 15					24th	202	
2015	Christopher Our	22	Chevy	TMP	STA; 12	WAT; 10	STA; 8	TMP; 4	RIV; 15	NHA; 9	MON; 28	STA	TMP	BRI	RIV	NHA	STA			23rd	254	
2015	Mark Pane	57	Chevy															TMP; 12		23rd	254	

=== ARCA Menards Series West ===
(key) (Bold – Pole position awarded by qualifying time. Italics – Pole position earned by points standings or practice time. * – Most laps led.)

ARCA Menards Series West results
Year	Team	No.	Make	1	2	3	4	5	6	7	8	9	10	11	AMSWC	Pts	Ref
2020	Venturini Motorsports	25	Toyota	LVS	UMC	UMC	IRW	EVG	DCS	CNS	LVS	AAS	KCR	PHO; 10	24th	34	
