= Jimmy Zacharias =

American racing driver (born 1991)

- Nationality: American
- Born: May 6, 1991 (age 35) Candor, New York, U.S.

NASCAR Whelen Modified Tour career
- Debut season: 2011
- Current team: Zacharias Motorsports
- Years active: 2011, 2013–2014, 2016, 2023, 2026–present
- Car number: 71
- Crew chief: Austin Kochenash
- Starts: 16
- Championships: 0
- Wins: 0
- Poles: 0
- Best finish: 23rd in 2014
- Finished last season: 40th (2026)
- Statistics up to date as of October 12, 2026.

Jimmy Zacharias (born May 6, 1991) is an American professional stock car racing driver who currently competes part-time in the NASCAR Whelen Modified Tour, driving the No. 71 for Zacharias Motorsports. He is the cousin of fellow racing driver Garrett Zacharias, who has competed in the ARCA Menards Series West.

Zacharias has also competed in series such as the NASCAR K&N Pro Series East, the NASCAR Whelen Southern Modified Tour, the Modified Racing Series, the Race of Champions Asphalt Modified Tour, and the World Series of Asphalt Stock Car Racing.

== Motorsports results ==
=== NASCAR ===
(key) (Bold – Pole position awarded by qualifying time. Italics – Pole position earned by points standings or practice time. * – Most laps led.)

==== K&N Pro Series East ====
NASCAR K&N Pro Series East results
Year	Team	No.	Make	1	2	3	4	5	6	7	8	9	10	11	12	13	14	NKNPSEC	Pts	Ref
2018	Marsh Racing	31	Chevy	NSM; 17	BRI; Wth	LGY	SBO	SBO	MEM	NJM	THO	NHA	IOW	GLN	GTW	NHA	DOV	55th	27	

==== Whelen Modified Tour ====
NASCAR Whelen Modified Tour results
Year	Car owner	No.	Make	1	2	3	4	5	6	7	8	9	10	11	12	13	14	15	16	17	18	NWMTC	Pts	Ref
2011	Ed Bennett III	59	Chevy	TMP	STA	STA	MND	TMP	NHA	RIV	STA	NHA	BRI	DEL	TMP	LRP	NHA	STA	TMP; 12			46th	127	
2013	Dave DeLange	45	Chevy	TMP; 21	STA	STA	WFD	RIV	NHA	MND	STA	TMP	BRI	RIV	NHA	STA						38th	49	
2013	Michael Odwanzy	71	Chevy														TMP; 18					38th	49	
2014	Boehler Racing Enterprises	3	Chevy	TMP; 10	STA; 22	STA; Wth	WFD; 17	RIV; 17	NHA; 13	MND; 22	STA	TMP; 14	BRI; 10	NHA	STA	TMP						23rd	227	
2016	Danny Watts Jr.	71	Chevy	TMP	STA	WFD	STA	TMP	RIV	NHA	MND	STA	TMP	BRI	RIV	OSW; 11	SEE	NHA; 14	STA	TMP		33rd	63	
2023	Pam Hulse	71	Chevy	NSM	RCH	MON	RIV	LEE	SEE	RIV	WAL	NHA	LMP	THO	LGY	OSW; 6	MON	RIV	NWS	THO	MAR	64th	38	
2026	Zacharias Motorsports	71	N/A	NSM; 14	MAR; 18	THO; Wth	SEE	RIV	OXF	SEE	CLM	WMM	MON	THO	NHA	STA	OSW	RIV	THO			40th	56	

==== Whelen Southern Modified Tour ====
NASCAR Whelen Southern Modified Tour results
Year	Car owner	No.	Make	1	2	3	4	5	6	7	8	9	10	11	12	NWSMTC	Pts	Ref
2012	Tommy Wanick	76	Chevy	CRW	CRW	SBO	CRW	CRW	BGS	BRI	LGY	THO; 11	CRW	CLT		40th	33	
2013	Michael Odwanzy	71	Chevy	CRW	SNM; 11	SBO	CRW	CRW	BGS	BRI; 2	LGY	CRW	CRW	SNM	CLT	25th	75	
