= Mike Speeney =

American racing driver

- Nationality: American
- Born: February 27, 1991 (age 35) Newtown, Pennsylvania, U.S.

NASCAR Whelen Southern Modified Tour career
- Debut season: 2011
- Years active: 2011–2013
- Starts: 18
- Championships: 0
- Wins: 0
- Poles: 0
- Best finish: 12th in 2012
- Statistics up to date as of October 17, 2025.

Mike Speeney (born February 27, 1991) is an American professional stock car racing driver who competed in the now defunct NASCAR Whelen Southern Modified Tour from 2011 to 2013.

Speeney has previously competed in series such as the NASCAR Whelen Modified Tour, SMART Modified Tour, the CARS Super Late Model Tour, the Carolina Pro Late Model Series, and NASCAR Weekly Series, and is a frequent competitor at Bowman Gray Stadium.

== Motorsports results ==
=== NASCAR ===
(key) (Bold – Pole position awarded by qualifying time. Italics – Pole position earned by points standings or practice time. * – Most laps led.)

==== Whelen Modified Tour ====
NASCAR Whelen Modified Tour results
Year	Car owner	No.	Make	1	2	3	4	5	6	7	8	9	10	11	12	13	14	NWMTC	Pts	Ref
2010	Mike Speeney	80	Chevy	TMP	STA	STA	MAR	NHA	LIM	MND	RIV	STA; 19	TMP	BRI	NHA	STA	TMP	49th	106	

==== Whelen Southern Modified Tour ====
NASCAR Whelen Southern Modified Tour results
Year	Car owner	No.	Make	1	2	3	4	5	6	7	8	9	10	11	12	13	14	NWSMTC	Pts	Ref
2011	Mike Speeney	80	Chevy	CRW; 16	HCY; 13	SBO; 18	CRW; 16	CRW; 14	BGS	BRI	CRW	LGY	THO	TRI	CRW	CLT	CRW	15th	584	
2012	Mike Speeney	80	Chevy	CRW; 16	CRW; 13	SBO; 25	CRW; 5	CRW; 8	BGS; 14	BRI; 4	LGY; 13	THO; 17	CRW; 16	CLT				12th	309	
2013	Mike Speeney	80	Chevy	CRW; 16	SNM; 20	SBO; 18	CRW	CRW	BGS	BRI	LGY	CRW	CRW	SNM	CLT			24th	78	

=== CARS Super Late Model Tour ===
(key)

CARS Super Late Model Tour results
Year	Team	No.	Make	1	2	3	4	5	6	7	8	9	10	11	12	13	CSLMTC	Pts	Ref
2017	MRI Motorsports	37M	Chevy	CON	DOM; 8	DOM; 5											6th	187	
2017	MRI Motorsports	37	Chevy				HCY; 7	HCY; 10	BRI	AND	ROU	TCM; 10	ROU; 13			SBO; 4	6th	187	
2017	MRI Motorsports	17	Toyota											HCY; 10	CON		6th	187	
2018	Mike Speeney	17	Toyota	MYB	NSH	ROU; 17	HCY	BRI	AND	HCY; 14	ROU; 6	SBO; 14					14th	81	
2019	Mike Speeney	17	Toyota	SNM; 6	HCY; 11	NSH	MMS; 19	BRI	HCY								14th	77	
2019	Mike Speeney	17	Chevy							ROU; 19	SBO						14th	77	
2020	Mike Speeney	17	Chevy	SNM; 9	HCY	JEN	HCY	FCS	BRI	FLC	NSH						24th	24	

=== SMART Modified Tour ===
SMART Modified Tour results
Year	Car owner	No.	Make	1	2	3	4	5	6	7	8	9	10	11	12	13	14	SMTC	Pts	Ref
2024	Mike Speeney	10	N/A	FLO	CRW	SBO	TRI	ROU	HCY	FCS	CRW	JAC	CAR	CRW	DOM	SBO; 11	NWS	47th	31	
2025	Mike Speeney	10	N/A	FLO	AND	SBO	ROU	HCY	FCS	CRW	CPS	CAR; DNS	CRW	DOM	FCS	TRI	NWS	51st	22	
2026	N/A	71	N/A	FLO	AND	SBO	DOM	HCY	WKS	FCR	CRW	PUL	CAR	ROU	TRI; 19	NWS		56th	22	
