= John Beatty Jr. =

American racing driver

- Born: November 15, 1975 (age 50) Merrick, New York, U.S.

NASCAR Whelen Modified Tour career
- Debut season: 2013
- Years active: 2013–2015, 2018–2020, 2022–2024
- Starts: 22
- Championships: 0
- Wins: 0
- Poles: 1
- Best finish: 30th in 2013, 2014
- Finished last season: 55th (2024)
- Statistics up to date as of April 16, 2025.

John Beatty Jr. (born November 15, 1975) is an American professional stock car racing driver who last competed part-time in the NASCAR Whelen Modified Tour, driving the No. 5 for Mark Mina. He was the 2023, 2024, and 2025 champion in the modified division at his home track of Riverhead Raceway.

Beatty has previously competed in the Tri-Track Open Modified Series and the World Series of Asphalt Stock Car Racing.

== Motorsports results ==
=== NASCAR ===
(key) (Bold – Pole position awarded by qualifying time. Italics – Pole position earned by points standings or practice time. * – Most laps led.)

==== Whelen Modified Tour ====
NASCAR Whelen Modified Tour results
Year	Car owner	No.	Make	1	2	3	4	5	6	7	8	9	10	11	12	13	14	15	16	17	18	NWMTC	Pts	Ref
2013	William Deakin	14	Chevy	TMP	STA	STA	WFD	RIV; 3	NHA	MND	STA											30th	113	
2013	William Deakin	11	Ford									TMP; 17	BRI									30th	113	
2013	William Deakin	11	Chevy											RIV; 23	NHA	STA	TMP; 20					30th	113	
2014	William Deakin	14	Chevy	TMP	STA	STA	WFD	**RIV**; 12*	NHA	MND	STA	TMP; 17	BRI	NHA	STA	TMP; 15						30th	90	
2015	William Deakin	11	Chevy	TMP	STA	WAT	STA	TMP	RIV	NHA	MON	STA	TMP	BRI	RIV	NHA	STA	TMP; 22				52nd	22	
2018	Mark Mina	5	Chevy	MYR	TMP	STA	SEE	TMP	LGY	RIV; 15	NHA	STA	TMP	BRI	OSW	RIV; 7	NHA	STA	TMP			41st	66	
2019	Mark Mina	5	Chevy	MYR	SBO	TMP	STA	WAL	SEE	TMP	RIV; 2	NHA	STA	TMP	OSW	RIV; 10	NHA	STA	TMP; 25			40th	96	
2020	Mark Mina	5	Chevy	JEN; 24	WMM	WMM	JEN	MND	TMP; 18	NHA	STA	TMP; Wth										36th	46	
2022	Mark Mina	5	Chevy	NSM	RCH	RIV; 8	LEE	JEN	MND	RIV; 7	WAL	NHA	CLM	TMP	LGY	OSW	RIV; 16	TMP	MAR			37th	101	
2023	Mark Mina	5	Chevy	NSM	RCH	MON	RIV; 15	LEE	SEE	RIV; 8	WAL	NHA	LMP	THO	LGY	OSW	MON	RIV; 15	NWS	THO	MAR	38th	94	
2024	Mark Mina	5	Chevy	NSM	RCH	THO	MON	RIV; 8	SEE	NHA	MON	LMP	THO	OSW	RIV	MON	THO	NWS	MAR			55th	36	
