= Tommy Barrett Jr. =

American racing driver (born 1995)

- Born: April 29, 1995 (age 31) Millis, Massachusetts, U.S.

NASCAR Whelen Modified Tour career
- Debut season: 2012
- Years active: 2012, 2014–2015
- Former teams: Gary Teto, Our Motorsports
- Starts: 16
- Championships: 0
- Wins: 1
- Poles: 1
- Best finish: 12th in 2014
- Statistics up to date as of July 23, 2024.

Tommy Barrett Jr. (born April 29, 1995) is an American former professional stock car racing driver who has previously competed in the NASCAR Whelen Modified Tour, driving for Our Motorsports.

Barrett made his debut in the tour in 2012 at the age of seventeen at Stafford Motor Speedway, where he finished in nineteenth. In 2014, he ran the full schedule with Our Motorsports, where he won at Bristol Motor Speedway and earned five top-ten finishes on his way to finish thirteenth in the final points standings. He was due to run another full season with the team the following year, however those plans fell through after the first race of the year after he was arrested in Willimantic, Connecticut in April for driving under the influence, and he has not competed in the tour since then.

Barrett has also competed in series such as the Modified Racing Series, the EXIT Realty Modified Touring Series, the Tri-Track Open Modified Series, and the World Series of Asphalt Stock Car Racing.

== Motorsports results ==
=== NASCAR ===
(key) (Bold – Pole position awarded by qualifying time. Italics – Pole position earned by points standings or practice time. * – Most laps led.)

==== Whelen Modified Tour ====
NASCAR Whelen Modified Tour results
| Year | Car owner | No. | Make | 1 | 2 | 3 | 4 | 5 | 6 | 7 | 8 | 9 | 10 | 11 | 12 | 13 | 14 | 15 | NWMTC | Pts | Ref |
|---|---|---|---|---|---|---|---|---|---|---|---|---|---|---|---|---|---|---|---|---|---|
| 2012 | Gary Teto | 10 | Chevy | TMP | STA | MND | STA | WFD | NHA | STA | TMP | BRI | TMP | RIV | NHA | STA; 19 | TMP; 7 | | 33rd | 62 | |
| 2014 | Christpher Our | 22 | Chevy | TMP; 23 | **STA**; 11 | STA; 20 | WFD; 23 | RIV; 27 | NHA; 23 | MND; 7 | STA; 4 | TMP; 15 | BRI; 1 | NHA; 9 | STA; 4 | TMP; 12 | | | 12th | 400 | |
| 2015 | Christpher Our | 22 | Chevy | TMP; 19 | STA | WAT | STA | TMP | RIV | NHA | MON | STA | TMP | BRI | RIV | NHA | STA | TMP | 50th | 25 | |

=== ARCA Racing Series ===
(key) (Bold – Pole position awarded by qualifying time. Italics – Pole position earned by points standings or practice time. * – Most laps led.)

ARCA Racing Series results
| Year | Team | No. | Make | 1 | 2 | 3 | 4 | 5 | 6 | 7 | 8 | 9 | 10 | 11 | 12 | 13 | 14 | 15 | 16 | 17 | 18 | 19 | 20 | ARSC | Pts | Ref |
|---|---|---|---|---|---|---|---|---|---|---|---|---|---|---|---|---|---|---|---|---|---|---|---|---|---|---|
| 2015 | Our Motorsports | 7 | Chevy | DAY; DNQ | MOB | NSH | SLM | TAL | TOL | NJE | POC | MCH | CHI | WIN | IOW | IRP | POC | BLN | ISF | DSF | SLM | KEN | KAN | N/A | 0 | |
