= Danny Watts Jr. =

American racing driver

- Nationality: American
- Born: March 14, 1961 (age 65) Wading River, New York, U.S.

NASCAR Whelen Modified Tour career
- Debut season: 1988
- Years active: 1988–1992, 1995–1998, 2014–2015
- Starts: 199
- Championships: 0
- Wins: 0
- Poles: 0
- Best finish: 24th in 1990
- Statistics up to date as of August 8, 2024.

Danny Watts Jr. (born March 14, 1961) is an American former professional stock car racing driver who currently fields the No. 82 part-time in the NASCAR Whelen Modified Tour.

Watts was previously a competitor of the tour, having made his debut at Thompson Speedway Motorsports Park in 1989. After retiring after the 2015 season, he fielded his own team in the Tour, and ran full-time until the end of 2023.

As a car owner, Watts has three career wins on the NWMT, one each with Ron Silk, Woody Pitkat, and Craig Lutz. Ted Christopher was his driver when he lost his life in a plane crash in 2017.

Watts has also previously competed in the SMART Modified Tour, the now defunct NASCAR Whelen Southern Modified Tour, the Southern Modified Race Tour, and the World Series of Asphalt Stock Car Racing.

== Motorsports results ==
=== NASCAR ===
(key) (Bold – Pole position awarded by qualifying time. Italics – Pole position earned by points standings or practice time. * – Most laps led.)

==== Whelen Modified Tour ====
NASCAR Whelen Modified Tour results
Year	Team	No.	Make	1	2	3	4	5	6	7	8	9	10	11	12	13	14	15	16	17	18	19	20	21	22	23	24	25	26	NWMTC	Pts	Ref
1988	N/A	N/A	N/A	ROU	MAR	TMP	MAR	JEN	IRP	MND	OSW	OSW	RIV; DNQ	JEN	RPS	TMP	RIV	OSW	TMP	OXF	OSW	TMP	POC	TIO	TMP	ROU	MAR			N/A	0	
1989	Danny Watts	82	Chevy	MAR	TMP	MAR	JEN	STA	IRP	OSW	WFD	MND	RIV	OSW	JEN	STA	RPS	RIV	OSW	TMP; 23	TMP	RPS	OSW	TMP	POC	STA	TIO	MAR	TMP	N/A	0	
1990	Danny Watts	82	Chevy	MAR	TMP	RCH	STA; DNQ	MAR	STA; 23	TMP; 15	MND; DNQ	HOL	STA; 23	RIV; DNQ	JEN	EPP; 18	RPS; DNQ	RIV; DNQ	TMP; 35	RPS	NHA; 21	TMP; 31	POC; 33	STA; 17	TMP; 15	MAR; 23				24th	1345	
1991	Danny Watts	82	Chevy	MAR	RCH	TMP; 18	NHA; 15	MAR; 18	NZH	STA; 26	TMP; 20	FLE; 21	OXF	RIV	JEN	STA	RPS	RIV	RCH; 20	TMP; 26	NHA; 33	TMP; 33	POC; 45	STA	TMP; 18	MAR				25th	1397	
1992	N/A	24	Chevy	MAR	TMP	RCH	STA	MAR	NHA	NZH	STA	TMP	FLE	RIV	NHA	STA	RPS	RIV	TMP; 17	TMP	NHA	STA								N/A	0	
1992	N/A	24	Buick																				MAR; 25	TMP; 25						N/A	0	
1995	N/A	82	Chevy	TMP	NHA	STA	NZH	STA	LEE	TMP	RIV	BEE	NHA	JEN	RPS	HOL	RIV	NHA	STA	TMP; 33	NHA	STA	TMP	TMP						N/A	0	
1996	N/A	82	Chevy	TMP	STA	NZH	STA	NHA	JEN	RIV; 23	LEE	RPS	HOL	TMP	RIV; 27	NHA	GLN	STA	NHA	NHA	STA	FLE	TMP							N/A	0	
1997	N/A	82	Chevy	TMP	MAR; 23	STA	NZH	STA	NHA; 32	FLE	JEN; 10	RIV	GLN	NHA; 28	RPS	HOL	TMP	RIV; 15	NHA	GLN	STA	NHA; 23	STA	FLE	TMP	RCH; 33				33rd	827	
1998	N/A	82	Chevy	RPS	TMP; 28	MAR	STA	NZH	STA	GLN	JEN	RIV	NHA	NHA	LEE	HOL	TMP	NHA	RIV	STA	NHA	TMP	STA	TMP	FLE					N/A	0	
2014	Pamela Hulse	82	Chevy	TMP	STA	STA	WFD	RIV	NHA	MND	STA	TMP	BRI	NHA; 16	STA	TMP; 23														34th	49	
2015	Pamela Hulse	82	Chevy	TMP; 35	STA	WAT	STA	TMP	RIV; DNQ	NHA	MON	STA	TMP	BRI	RIV; DNQ	NHA; 22	STA	TMP; 24												40th	74	

==== Whelen Southern Modified Tour ====
NASCAR Whelen Southern Modified Tour results
Year	Car owner	No.	Make	1	2	3	4	5	6	7	8	9	10	11	12	NSWMTC	Pts	Ref
2013	Danny Watts	82	Chevy	CRW	SNM	SBO	CRW	CRW	BGS	BRI	LGY	CRW	CRW	SNM	CLT; 22	35th	22	
