= Dave Brigati =

American racing driver

- Nationality: American
- Born: April 5, 1971 (age 55) Calverton, New York, U.S.

NASCAR Whelen Modified Tour career
- Debut season: 2007
- Years active: 2007, 2009–2011, 2013–2014, 2021
- Starts: 6
- Championships: 0
- Wins: 0
- Poles: 0
- Best finish: 41st in 2013
- Statistics up to date as of October 1, 2024.

Dave Brigati (born April 5, 1971) is an American professional stock car racing driver who has previously competed in the NASCAR Whelen Modified Tour and the now defunct NASCAR Whelen Southern Modified Tour.

Brigati is a frequent competitor in the modified divisions at Riverhead Raceway, where he has gained multiple wins since 2007.

== Motorsports results ==
=== NASCAR ===
(key) (Bold – Pole position awarded by qualifying time. Italics – Pole position earned by points standings or practice time. * – Most laps led.)

==== Whelen Modified Tour ====
NASCAR Whelen Modified Tour results
Year	Team	No.	Make	1	2	3	4	5	6	7	8	9	10	11	12	13	14	15	16	NWMTC	Pts	Ref
2007	N/A	3	Chevy	TMP	STA	WTO	STA	TMP	NHA	TSA	RIV; DNQ	STA	TMP	MAN	MAR	NHA	TMP	STA	TMP	65th	70	
2009	Brian Schwarz	98	Chevy	TMP	STA	STA	NHA	SPE	RIV; 2	STA	BRI	TMP	NHA	MAR	STA	TMP				47th	170	
2010	Brian Schwarz	88	Chevy	TMP	STA	STA	MAR	NHA	LIM	MND	RIV; 11	STA	TMP	BRI	NHA	STA	TMP			46th	130	
2011	Brian Schwarz	90	Chevy	TMP	STA	STA	MND	TMP	NHA	RIV; 12	STA	NHA	BRI	DEL	TMP	LRP	NHA	STA	TMP	45th	127	
2013	Brian Schwarz	98	Chevy	TMP	STA	STA	WFD	RIV; 25	NHA	MND	STA	TMP	BRI	RIV	NHA	STA	TMP			41st	41	
2014	Terry Zacharias	71	Chevy	TMP	STA	STA	WFD	RIV; 19	NHA	MND	STA	TMP	BRI	NHA	STA	TMP				44th	25	
2021	N/A	98	Chevy	MAR	STA	RIV	JEN	OSW	RIV	NHA	NRP	STA	BEE	OSW	RCH	RIV; 22	STA			62nd	23	

==== Whelen Southern Modified Tour ====
NASCAR Whelen Southern Modified Tour results
Year	Car owner	No.	Make	1	2	3	4	5	6	7	8	9	10	NSWMTC	Pts	Ref
2010	Brian Schwarz	98	Chevy	ATL; 4	CRW	SBO; 13	CRW	BGS	BRI	CRW	LGY	TRI	CLT	25th	284	
