= Glen Reen =

American racing driver

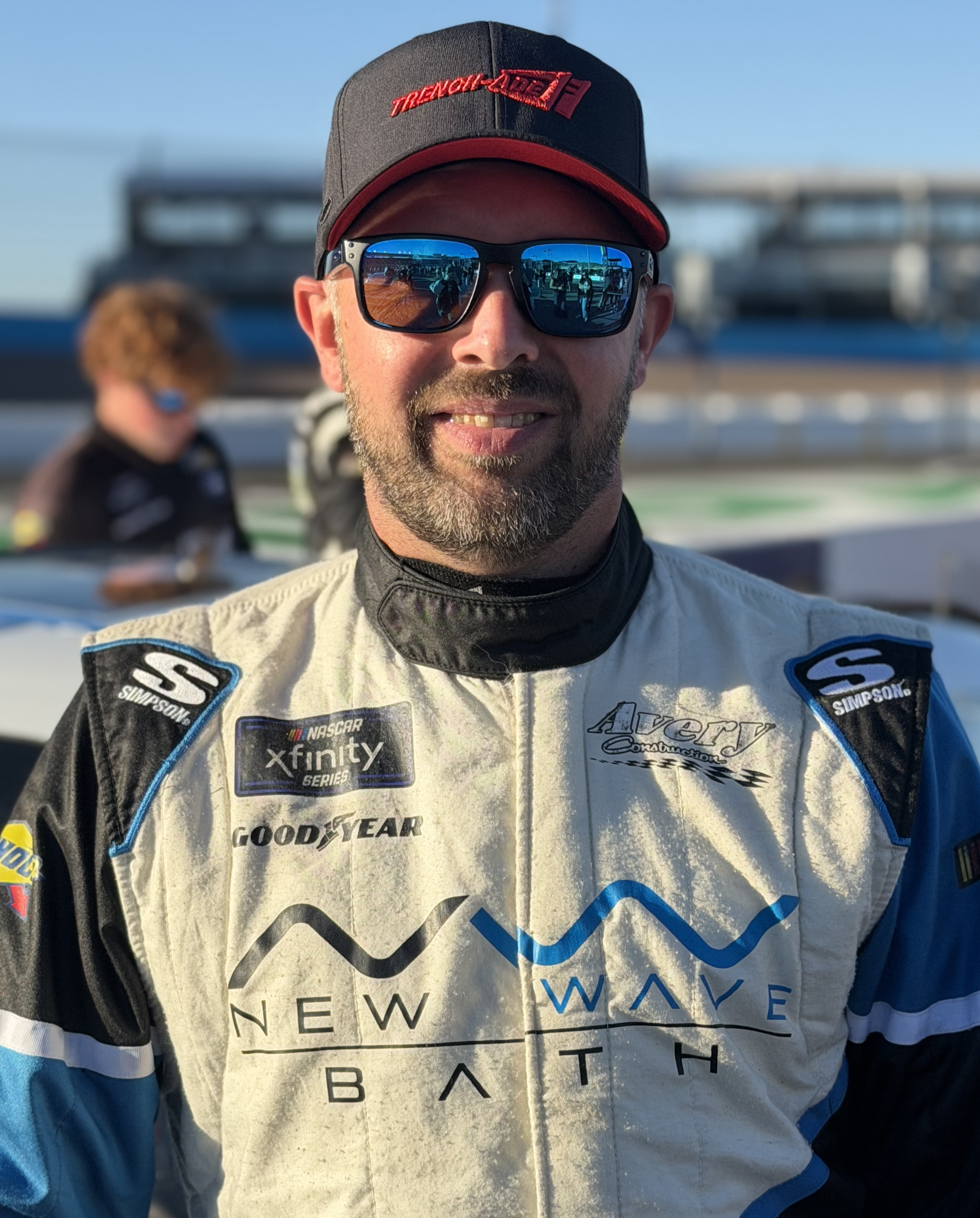
- Reen at Phoenix Raceway in 2025
- Born: June 9, 1985 (age 41); Wilbraham, Massachusetts, U.S.

NASCAR O'Reilly Auto Parts Series career
- 8 races run over 3 years
- 2026 position: 50th
- Best finish: 50th (2026)
- First race: 2024 Hy-Vee PERKS 250 (Iowa)
- Last race: 2026 Fleetio 200 (Darlington)
Wins	Top tens	Poles
0	0	0

ARCA Menards Series career
- 3 races run over 2 years
- ARCA no., team: No. 07 (KLAS Motorsports)
- Best finish: 70th (2025)
- First race: 2025 Lime Rock Park 100 (Lime Rock)
- Last race: 2026 General Tire 200 (Daytona)
Wins	Top tens	Poles
0	2	0

ARCA Menards Series East career
- 1 race run over 1 year
- Best finish: 54th (2016)
- First race: 2016 Bully Hill Vineyards 100 (Watkins Glen)
Wins	Top tens	Poles
0	0	0
- Statistics up to date as of November 7, 2026.

Glen Reen (born June 9, 1985) is an American professional stock car racing driver. He last competed part-time in the NASCAR O'Reilly Auto Parts Series, driving the No. 53/55 Chevrolet Camaro SS/Toyota GR Supra for Joey Gase Motorsports with Scott Osteen, as well as part-time in the ARCA Menards Series, driving the No. 07 for KLAS Motorsports. He has also previously competed in the NASCAR Whelen Modified Tour and what is now the ARCA Menards Series East.

== Racing career ==
Reen is a longtime competitor in the modified ranks, having previously competed in the NASCAR Whelen Modified Tour from 2008 to 2014, where he won one race in 2011 at Thompson Speedway. In 2016, he competed in the NASCAR K&N Pro Series East race at Watkins Glen International for Marsh Racing, where he finished in nineteenth.

In 2024, Reen made his debut in the NASCAR Xfinity Series at Iowa Speedway, driving the No. 53 Chevrolet for Joey Gase Motorsports, where he finished 38th due to a carburetor issue. His debut was originally going to come in the following week's race at New Hampshire Motor Speedway but was moved up a week after the team settled on him as the driver of that car at the last minute (the driver of the No. 53 car had been listed as "TBA" so long that it was still listed on the qualifying order sheet from NASCAR). At New Hampshire, Reen would finish 28th driving the team's full-time entry, the No. 35 car.

In 2025, Reen attempted to qualify for the Xfinity Series at Nashville Superspeedway, once again driving the No. 35 for Joey Gase Motorsports with Scott Osteen, but failed to qualify. Several weeks later, it was revealed that Reen would make his debut in the ARCA Menards Series at Lime Rock Park, driving the No. 73 Chevrolet for KLAS Motorsports.

== Motorsports results ==
=== NASCAR ===
(key) (Bold – Pole position awarded by qualifying time. Italics – Pole position earned by points standings or practice time. * – Most laps led.)

==== O'Reilly Auto Parts Series ====
NASCAR O'Reilly Auto Parts Series results
Year	Team	No.	Make	1	2	3	4	5	6	7	8	9	10	11	12	13	14	15	16	17	18	19	20	21	22	23	24	25	26	27	28	29	30	31	32	33	NOAPSC	Pts	Ref
2024	Joey Gase Motorsports	53	Chevy	DAY	ATL	LVS	PHO	COA	RCH	MAR	TEX	TAL	DOV	DAR	CLT	PIR	SON	IOW; 38																			69th	10	
2024	Joey Gase Motorsports	35	Chevy																NHA; 28	NSH	CSC	POC	IND	MCH	DAY	DAR	ATL	GLN	BRI	KAN	TAL	ROV	LVS	HOM	MAR	PHO	69th	10	
2025	Joey Gase Motorsports with Scott Osteen	35	Chevy	DAY	ATL	COA	PHO	LVS	HOM	MAR	DAR	BRI	CAR	TAL	TEX	CLT	NSH; DNQ	MXC	POC	ATL	CSC	SON															55th	25	
2025	Joey Gase Motorsports with Scott Osteen	35	Toyota																				DOV; DNQ	IND	IOW	GLN; 21	DAY	PIR	GTW; 31	BRI							55th	25	
2025	Joey Gase Motorsports with Scott Osteen	35	Ford																												KAN; DNQ	ROV	LVS	TAL	MAR		55th	25	
2025	Alpha Prime Racing	5	Ford																																	PHO; 34	55th	25	
2026	Joey Gase Motorsports with Scott Osteen	55	Toyota	DAY	ATL	COA	PHO	LVS	DAR	MAR	CAR	BRI	KAN	TAL	TEX	GLN; 30	DOV	CLT	NSH	POC	COR	SON	CHI														50th	32	
2026	Joey Gase Motorsports with Scott Osteen	53	Chevy																					ATL; 15	IND	IOW	DAY										50th	32	
2026	Joey Gase Motorsports with Scott Osteen	53	Toyota																									DAR; 34	GTW	BRI	LVS	CLT	PHO	TAL	MAR	HOM	50th	32	

==== K&N Pro Series East ====
NASCAR K&N Pro Series East results
Year	Team	No.	Make	1	2	3	4	5	6	7	8	9	10	11	12	13	14	NKNPSEC	Pts	Ref
2016	Marsh Racing	31	Chevy	NSM	MOB	GRE	BRI	VIR	DOM	STA	COL	NHA	IOW	GLN; 19	GRE	NJM	DOV	54th	25	

==== Whelen Modified Tour ====
NASCAR Whelen Modified Tour results
Year	Car owner	No.	Make	1	2	3	4	5	6	7	8	9	10	11	12	13	14	15	16	NWMTC	Pts	Ref
2008	Thomas Reen	17	Chevy	TMP; 27	STA; 13		TMP; 23	NHA; 35	SPE; 6	RIV; 12	STA; 24	TMP; 6	MAN; 10	TMP; 25	NHA; 35		CHE; 24	STA; 20	TMP; 22	18th	1635	
2008	Thomas Reen	17	Pontiac			STA; 20														18th	1635	
2008	Thomas Reen	7	Chevy													MAR; 26				18th	1635	
2009	Thomas Reen	17	Chevy	TMP; 12	STA; 18	STA; 13	NHA; 19	SPE; 17	RIV; 5	STA; 26	BRI; 20	TMP; 9	NHA; 31	MAR; 17	STA; 22	TMP; 16				14th	1453	
2010	Ralph Ridgeway	17	Chevy	TMP	STA; 25	STA; 17	MAR	NHA; 34	LIM	MND; 8	RIV	STA; 15	TMP; 10	BRI	NHA; 21	STA; 7	TMP; 16			26th	1016	
2011	Ralph Ridgeway	17	Chevy	TMP	STA	STA	MND; 13	TMP			STA; 20	NHA	BRI	DEL	TMP	LRP	NHA	STA; 20	TMP; 1	30th	609	
2011	Linda Rodenbaugh	38	Chevy						NHA; 23	RIV										30th	609	
2013	Mark Sypher	8	Chevy	TMP	STA	STA	WFD	RIV	NHA	MND	STA	TMP; 23	BRI	RIV; 18	NHA	STA	TMP; 17			33rd	74	
2014	Mark Sypher	8	Chevy	TMP; 15	STA; 25	STA; 10	WFD; 12	RIV; 14	NHA; 23	MND; 12	STA; 16	TMP; 9	BRI; 15	NHA; 21	STA; 11	TMP; 18				14th	372	

=== ARCA Menards Series ===
(key) (Bold – Pole position awarded by qualifying time. Italics – Pole position earned by points standings or practice time. * – Most laps led.)

ARCA Menards Series results
Year	Team	No.	Make	1	2	3	4	5	6	7	8	9	10	11	12	13	14	15	16	17	18	19	20	AMSC	Pts	Ref
2025	KLAS Motorsports	73	Chevy	DAY	PHO	TAL	KAN	CLT	MCH	BLN	ELK	LRP; 21	DOV	IRP	IOW									70th	63	
2025	KLAS Motorsports	71	Chevy													GLN; 4	ISF	MAD	DSF	BRI	SLM	KAN	TOL	70th	63	
2026	KLAS Motorsports	07	Ford	DAY; 5	PHO	KAN	TAL	GLN	TOL	MCH	POC	BER	ELK	CHI	LRP	IRP	IOW	ISF	MAD	DSF	SLM	BRI	KAN	81st	39	
