= Woody Pitkat =

American racing driver

- Nationality: American
- Born: July 7, 1979 (age 47) Stafford, Connecticut, U.S.

NASCAR Whelen Modified Tour career
- Debut season: 2007
- Years active: 2007–2025
- Starts: 197
- Championships: 0
- Wins: 4
- Poles: 4
- Best finish: 3rd in 2015
- Finished last season: 32nd (2025)
- Statistics up to date as of October 24, 2025.

Woody Pitkat (born July 7, 1979) is an American professional stock car racing driver who last competed part-time in the NASCAR Whelen Modified Tour, driving the No. 82 for Danny Watts Racing. Pitkat is long-time competitor of the series, having made his debut in 2007, and has since won four races and four pole positions. Pitkat's brother in law is Bobby Santos III, the 2010 Whelen Modified Tour Champion.

Pitkat's home town track is the well known Stafford Motor Speedway, where he ranks in the top-five on the all time wins list, having won in four different divisions, as well as scoring three track championships (2006 & 2012 in Late Models, 2013 in SK Modifieds).

Pitkat has also competed in what is now known as the ARCA Menards Series East and the now defunct NASCAR Whelen Southern Modified Tour, as well as the SMART Modified Tour, the ACT Late Model Tour, the Modified Racing Series (where he was the 2015 & 2018 series champion), the Tri-Track Open Modified Series, and the World Series of Asphalt Stock Car Racing.

== Motorsports results ==
=== NASCAR ===
(key) (Bold – Pole position awarded by qualifying time. Italics – Pole position earned by points standings or practice time. * – Most laps led.)

==== K&N Pro Series East ====
NASCAR K&N Pro Series East results
Year	Team	No.	Make	1	2	3	4	5	6	7	8	9	10	11	12	13	14	NKNPSEC	Pts	Ref
2008	Mike Olsen	61	Chevy	GRE	IOW	SBO	GLN	NHA	TMP	NSH	ADI	LRP	MFD	NHA	DOV	STA; 6		57th	150	
2017	NextGen Motorsports	9	Ford	NSM	GRE	BRI	SBO	SBO	MEM	BLN	TMP	NHA; DNQ	IOW	GLN	LGY	NJM	DOV	70th	22	

==== Whelen Modified Tour ====
NASCAR Whelen Modified Tour results
Year	Car owner	No.	Make	1	2	3	4	5	6	7	8	9	10	11	12	13	14	15	16	17	18	NWMTC	Pts	Ref
2007	Hill Enterprises	79	Pontiac	TMP	STA	WTO	STA	TMP; 10	NHA; 14	TSA	RIV; DNQ	STA; 10	TMP; 17	MAN; 3	MAR; 23	NHA; 24	TMP; 7	STA; 28	TMP; 31			27th	1219	
2008	Don King	88	Chevy	TMP	STA	STA; 17	TMP	NHA	SPE	RIV	STA				NHA; 8	MAR; 6			TMP; 18			30th	883	
2008	Don King	28	Chevy									TMP; 18	MAN; 12	TMP			CHE; 10	STA				30th	883	
2009	Don King	28	Chevy	TMP; 19	STA; 7	STA; 8	NHA; 9	SPE; 13	RIV; 15	STA; 9		TMP; 21	NHA; 26		STA; 16	TMP; 10						9th	1621	
2009	Don King	88	Chevy								BRI; 4			MAR; 16								9th	1621	
2010	Don King	28	Chevy	TMP; 12	STA; 24	STA; 23	MAR; 8	NHA; 9	LIM; 11	MND; 13	RIV; 16	STA; 21	TMP; 25	BRI; 11	NHA; 22	STA; 30	TMP; 30					16th	1527	
2011	Don King	28	Chevy	TMP; 25	STA; 10	STA; 22	MND	TMP; 18	NHA; 9	RIV	STA; 22	NHA; 2	BRI; 10	DEL	TMP; 14	LRP	NHA; 27	STA				23rd	1286	
2011	Linda Rodenbaugh	38	Chevy																TMP; 19			23rd	1286	
2012	John Lukosavage	11	Chevy	TMP; 15	STA; 8	MND																21st	301	
2012	John Lukosavage	11	Ford				STA; 8	WFD	NHA; 10	STA; 8	TMP; 22	BRI	TMP	RIV								21st	301	
2012	Hill Enterprises	79	Pontiac												NHA; 14	STA; 2*	TMP; 10					21st	301	
2013	Hill Enterprises	79	Pontiac	TMP; 11	STA; 26	STA; 10	WFD; 22	RIV; 6	NHA; 6	MND; 9	STA; 7	TMP; 5	BRI; 6	RIV; 4	NHA; 9		TMP; 14					9th	457	
2013	Hill Enterprises	79	Chevy													STA; 24						9th	457	
2014	Buzz Chew	88	Chevy	**TMP**; 2	STA; 4	STA; 5	WFD; 7	RIV; 20	NHA; 25	MND; 20	STA; 1*	TMP; 16	BRI; 14	NHA; 1*	STA; 6	**TMP**; 35						9th	429	
2015	Buzz Chew	88	Chevy	TMP; 2	STA; 1	WFD; 5	STA; 2	**TMP**; 5	RIV; 5	NHA; 7	MND; 2	STA; 3	TMP; 2	**BRI**; 2	RIV; 7		STA; 12	TMP; 5				3rd	600	
2015	Buzz Chew	38	Chevy													NHA; 10						3rd	600	
2016	Kevin Stuart	85	Chevy	TMP; 10	STA; 25	WFD; 19	STA; 29	TMP; 25	RIV	NHA; 7	MND; 8	STA; 9	TMP; 4	BRI	RIV	OSW	SEE; 20	NHA; 24	STA; 9	TMP; 7		20th	377	
2017	Russell Goodale	46	Chevy	MYR; 8	THO; 8	STA; 12	LGY; 16	THO; 11	RIV; 17	NHA; 13												13th	375	
2017	Tommy Baldwin Racing	7	Chevy								STA; 18											13th	375	
2017	Erika Pitkat	52	Chevy									THO; 10	BRI	SEE	OSW	RIV						13th	375	
2017	Danny Watts Racing	82	Chevy														NHA; 8	STA; 25	THO; 7			13th	375	
2018	Danny Watts Racing	82	Chevy	MYR; 27	TMP; 12	STA; 25	SEE; 26	TMP; 15	LGY	RIV	NHA; 14	STA; 2	TMP; 6	BRI; 19	OSW; 4	RIV	NHA; 14	STA; 18	TMP; 13			14th	379	
2019	Danny Watts Racing	82	Chevy	MYR; 19	SBO; 12	TMP; 8	STA; 11	WAL; 1	SEE; 11	TMP; 10	RIV; 13	NHA; 34	STA; 15	TMP; 10	OSW	RIV						12th	451	
2019	Eddie Harvey	1	Chevy														NHA; 12	STA; 8	TMP; 5			12th	451	
2020	Eddie Harvey	1	Chevy	JEN; 16		WMM; 23	JEN; 16		TMP; 21	NHA; 29												13th	254	
2020	Eddie Harvey	1	Ford		WMM; 5			MND; 7			STA; 19	TMP; 7										13th	254	
2021	Eddie Harvey	1	Chevy	MAR; 9		RIV; 5	JEN; 4	OSW; 6	RIV; 17	NHA; 11	NRP; 23	STA; 6	BEE; 12	OSW; 8	RCH; 10	RIV; 6	STA; 19					7th	466	
2021	Eddie Harvey	1	Ford		STA; 15																	7th	466	
2023	Stan Mertz	6	Chevy	NSM	RCH	MON; 16	RIV	LEE; 17	SEE; 20	RIV	WAL	NHA; 19	LMP	THO; 11	LGY	OSW	MON; 14	RIV	NWS	THO; 9	MAR	23rd	202	
2024	Danny Watts Racing	82	Chevy	NSM	RCH	THO	MON	RIV	SEE	NHA	MON; 6	LMP	THO; 15	OSW; 11	RIV	MON; 5	THO; 12	NWS	MAR			20th	171	
2025	Danny Watts Racing	82	Chevy	NSM	THO; 19	NWS	SEE	RIV	WMM; 19	LMP	MON	MON; Wth	THO	RCH	OSW	NHA; 6	RIV	THO; 14	MAR			32nd	118	

==== Whelen Southern Modified Tour ====
NASCAR Whelen Southern Modified Tour results
Year	Car owner	No.	Make	1	2	3	4	5	6	7	8	9	10	11	12	NWSMTC	Pts	Ref
2007	Hill Enterprises	79	Pontiac	CRW	FAI	GRE	CRW	CRW	BGS	MAR	ACE; 5	CRW	SNM	CRW	CRW; 14	33rd	276	
2013	Hill Enterprises	79	Pontiac	CRW	SNM; 10	SBO	CRW	CRW	BGS; 19	BRI	LGY	CRW	CRW	SNM	CLT	27th	59	

=== SMART Modified Tour ===
SMART Modified Tour results
Year	Car owner	No.	Make	1	2	3	4	5	6	7	8	9	10	11	12	13	14	SMTC	Pts	Ref
2024	Doug Dunleavy	88	N/A	FLO	CRW	SBO; 16	TRI	ROU	HCY	FCS	CRW	JAC	CAR	CRW	DOM	SBO	NWS	51st	24	
