= Ron Yuhas Jr. =

American racing driver

- Nationality: American
- Born: June 27, 1977 (age 49) Groton, Connecticut, U.S.

NASCAR Whelen Modified Tour career
- Debut season: 2006
- Years active: 2006–2007, 2010–2014
- Starts: 74
- Championships: 0
- Wins: 0
- Poles: 0
- Best finish: 10th in 2012
- Statistics up to date as of August 2, 2024.

Ron Yuhas Jr. (born June 27, 1977) is an American former professional stock car racing driver and crew chief who competed in the NASCAR Whelen Modified Tour from 2006 to 2014.

On September 20, 2014, Yuhas was involved in a violent crash during a Modified Tour race at New Hampshire Motor Speedway, where his car launched over the car of Timmy Solomito and landed on its roof during a green-white checkered restart. Yuhas was able to exit his car under his own power but was placed on a stretcher to a hospital in Concord, New Hampshire. He was released a week later, but sat out the two remaining races of the year and would not race again afterwards.

Yuhas also competed in series such as the ACT Late Model Tour and the Northeastern Midget Association. He was the 2009 SK Modified track champion at the Waterford Speedbowl.

== Motorsports results ==
=== NASCAR ===
(key) (Bold – Pole position awarded by qualifying time. Italics – Pole position earned by points standings or practice time. * – Most laps led.)

==== Whelen Modified Tour ====
NASCAR Whelen Modified Tour results
Year	Car owner	No.	Make	1	2	3	4	5	6	7	8	9	10	11	12	13	14	15	16	NWMTC	Pts	Ref
2006	Richard Marquardt	6	Chevy	TMP; 23	STA; 14	JEN; DNQ	TMP; 9	STA; 29	NHA; 15	HOL; 29	RIV; DNQ	STA; 15	TMP; 8	MAR; 6	TMP; 24	NHA; 37	WFD; 7	TMP; 17	STA; 21	18th	1614	
2007	Richard Marquardt	6	Chevy	TMP; 22	STA; 27	WTO; 19	STA; 15	TMP; 25	NHA; 8	TSA	RIV	STA	TMP; 3	MAN	MAR	NHA; 35	TMP; 14	STA	TMP; 30	29th	1050	
2010	Ralph Solhem	0	Chevy	TMP	STA	STA	MAR	NHA	LIM	MND	RIV	STA	TMP	BRI	NHA	STA	TMP; 21			50th	100	
2011	Mike Murphy	64	Chevy	TMP; 8	STA; 19	STA; 16	MND; 8	TMP; 11	NHA; 7	RIV; 18	STA; 18	NHA; 21	BRI; 23	DEL	TMP	LRP	NHA	STA	TMP	24th	1193	
2012	Mike Murphy	64	Chevy	TMP; 18	STA; 7	MND; 16	STA; 12	WFD; 4	NHA; 25	STA; 11	TMP; 9	BRI; 5	TMP; 14	RIV; 18	NHA; 9	STA; 12	TMP; 17			10th	439	
2013	Mike Murphy	64	Chevy	TMP; 27	STA; 7	STA; 11	WFD; 15	RIV; 21	NHA; 18	MND; 13	STA; 10	TMP; 10	BRI; 3	RIV; 16	NHA; 17	STA; 11	TMP; 13			12th	424	
2014	Mike Murphy	64	Chevy	TMP; 6	STA; 16	STA; 12	WFD; 9	RIV; 23	NHA; 27	MND; 10	STA; 17	TMP; 19	BRI; 12	NHA; 18	STA	TMP				19th	315	
