= Luke Fleming =

American racing driver

- Nationality: American
- Born: June 17, 1987 (age 39) Mount Airy, North Carolina, U.S.

NASCAR Whelen Southern Modified Tour career
- Debut season: 2010
- Years active: 2009–2010, 2013–2015
- Starts: 29
- Championships: 0
- Wins: 1
- Poles: 0
- Best finish: 7th in 2014
- Statistics up to date as of May 19, 2025.

Luke Fleming (born June 17, 1987) is an American professional stock car racing driver who competed in the now defunct NASCAR Whelen Southern Modified Tour from 2009 to 2015. He is the son and nephew of fellow racing drivers Chris Fleming and Frank Fleming respectively.

Fleming has previously competed in series such as the SMART Modified Tour, the NASCAR Whelen Modified Tour, the Mid-East Modified Tour, and the World Series of Asphalt Stock Car Racing.

== Motorsports results ==
=== NASCAR ===
(key) (Bold – Pole position awarded by qualifying time. Italics – Pole position earned by points standings or practice time. * – Most laps led.)

==== Whelen Modified Tour ====
NASCAR Whelen Modified Tour results
Year	Car owner	No.	Make	1	2	3	4	5	6	7	8	9	10	11	12	13	14	15	16	NWMTC	Pts	Ref
2025	Chris Fleming	40	Chevy	NSM	THO	NWS; 10	SEE	RIV	WMM	LMP	MON	MON	THO	RCH	OSW	NHA	RIV	THO	MAR; 22	50th	56	
2026	Frank Fleming	48	Chevy	NSM; DNQ																48th	32	
2026	Frank Fleming	40	Chevy		MAR; 21	THO	SEE	RIV	OXF	SEE	CLM	WMM	MON	THO	NHA	STA	OSW	RIV	THO	48th	32	

==== Whelen Southern Modified Tour ====
NASCAR Whelen Southern Modified Tour results
Year	Car owner	No.	Make	1	2	3	4	5	6	7	8	9	10	11	12	13	14	NWSMTC	Pts	Ref
2009	Amy Fleming	13	Chevy	CON	SBO	CRW	LAN	CRW	BGS; 1	BRI	CRW	MBS	CRW	CRW	MAR	ACE	CRW	34th	180	
2010	Amy Fleming	29	Chevy	ATL	CRW	SBO	CRW	BGS; 12	BRI	CRW	LGY	TRI	CLT					33rd	127	
2013	Frank Fleming	40	Chevy	CRW; 15														8th	402	
2013	Frank Fleming	40	Ford		SNM; 13	SBO; 11	CRW; 6	CRW; 7	BGS; 8	BRI; 29	LGY; 15	CRW; 11	CRW; 15	SNM; 5	CLT; 9			8th	402	
2014	Frank Fleming	40	Ford	CRW; 8	SNM; 6	SBO; 4	LGY; 4	CRW; 13	BGS; 3	BRI; 4	LGY; 10	CRW; 6	SBO; 14	SNM; 11		CRW; 5	CLT; 10	7th	511	
2014	Frank Fleming	40	Chevy												CRW; 7			7th	511	
2015	Howard Harvey	10	Chevy	CRW	CRW	SBO	LGY	CRW; 11	BGS	BRI	LGY	SBO	CLT					26th	33	

=== SMART Modified Tour ===
SMART Modified Tour results
Year	Car owner	No.	Make	1	2	3	4	5	6	7	8	9	10	11	12	13	14	SMTC	Pts	Ref
2004	N/A	13	N/A	CRW	UMP	CRW	CRW	UMP	UMP	CRW	MYB	CRW	CRW	PUL	CON	UMP; 20		44th	103	
2021	N/A	40	N/A	CRW	FLO	SBO	FCS	CRW	DIL	CAR	CRW	DOM	PUL; 28	HCY	ACE			54th	3	
2022	N/A	40	N/A	FLO	SNM	CRW; 21	SBO; 27	FCS	CRW	NWS	NWS	CAR	DOM	HCY	TRI	PUL		48th	15	
2025	Luke Fleming	13	N/A	FLO	AND	SBO	ROU	HCY	FCS	CRW	CPS	CAR	CRW	DOM	FCS	TRI; 19	NWS	50th	22	
2026	N/A	40F	N/A	FLO	AND	SBO	DOM	HCY	WKS	FCR	CRW	PUL	CAR	ROU	TRI; 21	NWS; Wth		63rd	20	
