= Jeff Fultz =

American racing driver (born 1968)

- Born: December 14, 1968 (age 57); Blue Ash, Ohio, U.S.
- Achievements: 2002, 2004, 2005 NASCAR Southeast Series Champion

NASCAR O'Reilly Auto Parts Series career
- 7 races run over 3 years
- 2003 position: 77th
- Best finish: 77th (2003)
- First race: 2001 Sam's Club 200 (Rockingham)
- Last race: 2003 Little Trees 300 (Charlotte)
Wins	Top tens	Poles
0	0	0

ARCA Menards Series career
- 8 races run over 3 years
- Best finish: 42nd (2003)
- First race: 2000 EasyCare Vehicle Services Contracts 100 (Charlotte)
- Last race: 2004 EasyCare Vehicle Services Contracts 150 (Charlotte)
- First win: 2002 EasyCare Vehicle Services Contracts 100 (Charlotte)
Wins	Top tens	Poles
1	4	0

ARCA Menards Series East career
- 1 race run over 1 year
- Best finish: 64th (2004)
- First race: 2004 Siemens 125 (New Hampshire)
Wins	Top tens	Poles
0	0	0
- Statistics up to date as of April 16, 2026.

Jeff Fultz (December 14, 1968) is an American professional stock car racing driver and team owner. He is a three-time champion of the now-defunct NASCAR Southeast Series, having won it in 2002, 2004, and 2005, and has the most wins in the category with 26. He has also raced in the NASCAR Busch Series and the ARCA Racing Series.

Fultz is also the co-founder of FURY Race Cars, and has previously worked for Port City Racecars.

== Racing career ==
Fultz first raced in the NASCAR Southeast Series in 1996, driving in fourteen of the twenty-three races on the schedule with a win at Caraway Speedway in Asheboro, North Carolina, finishing seventeenth in points. The following year, he would run the full schedule and finish second in the point standings behind Hal Goodson, with one win at St. Augustine Speedway. Fultz would spit his schedule the following year driving in the Southeast Series, winning two poles and a best finish of third at Louisville Motor Speedway in just ten starts, and in the ASA National Tour, running the first ten races on the schedule with a top-ten finish at Tri-County Motor Speedway with a seventh place finish.

Fultz would solely focus on the Southeast Series for the next two seasons, finishing fifth in the points in 1999, and second behind Billy Bigley in 2000. It was in the latter year that Fultz would make his ARCA debut, running both Charlotte races with a best finish of thirteenth in his first start. In 2001, he would finish third in the Southeast Series standings with four wins and two poles. Fultz also made his NASCAR Busch Series debut at North Carolina Speedway, driving the No. 86 Chevrolet for Jimmy Craig, finishing 39th due to an engine problem. He would also attempt to make his Winston Cup Series debut at Charlotte for the Coca-Cola 600 driving for Gene DeHart and Mike Clark, ultimately failing to qualify. It was during this time that he also served as a fabricator for Jasper Motorsports.

In 2002, Fultz would win his first Southeast Series title with three wins at Myrtle Beach, Nashville and Memphis. He would also win his first ARCA race that year at Charlotte, as well as making three Busch Series races that year with a best finish of 26th at Nashville. Although Fultz would win the most races in the Southeast season in 2003, he would ultimately finish second in the standings behind Charlie Bradberry. He would run four races in the ARCA Series, three races in the Busch Series, and would attempt two Winston Cup races, failing to qualify at both Atlanta and Charlotte.

Fultz would win the Southeast championship again in 2004 ahead of J. R. Norris with five wins and two poles. He attempted again to make his debut in the now Nextel Cup Series at Charlotte for the Coca-Cola 600, driving the No. 78 Ford for Harrah Racing, failing to qualify for the event. In 2005, he would win the Southeast championship again ahead of Jason Hogan with four wins. He would run one more race in the series the following year before the series folded at the end of the season. He also ran in the Hooters Pro Cup Series that year, running in fourteen races with a pole at Lakeland and a best finish of fifth at Myrtle Beach.

Since the folding of the Southeast Series, Fultz has competed sporadically in various late-model events like the Snowball Derby, the Winchester 400 and in various other late-model and modified series. He also acts as the driver and owner of his late-model team Jeff Fultz Racing, which has fielded drivers such as Jordan Anderson, Kodie Conner, and William Byron.

== Motorsports career results ==
=== NASCAR ===
(key) (Bold – Pole position awarded by qualifying time. Italics – Pole position earned by points standings or practice time. * – Most laps led.)

==== Nextel Cup Series ====
NASCAR Nextel Cup Series results
Year	Team	No.	Make	1	2	3	4	5	6	7	8	9	10	11	12	13	14	15	16	17	18	19	20	21	22	23	24	25	26	27	28	29	30	31	32	33	34	35	36	NNCC	Pts	Ref
2001	DeHart Racing	54	Ford	DAY	CAR	LVS	ATL	DAR	BRI	TEX	MAR	TAL	CAL	RCH	CLT; DNQ	DOV	MCH	POC	SON	DAY	CHI	NHA	POC	IND	GLN	MCH	BRI	DAR	RCH	DOV	KAN	CLT	MAR	TAL	PHO	CAR	HOM	ATL	NHA	N/A	-	
2003	CLR Racing	57	Ford	DAY	CAR	LVS	ATL; DNQ	DAR	BRI	TEX	TAL	MAR	CAL	RCH	CLT	DOV	POC	MCH	SON	DAY	CHI	NHA	POC	IND	GLN	MCH	BRI	DAR	RCH	NHA	DOV	TAL	KAN							N/A	-	
2003	Harrah Racing	55	Ford																															CLT; DNQ	MAR	ATL	PHO	CAR	HOM	N/A	-	
2004	Harrah Racing	78	Ford	DAY	CAR	LVS	ATL	DAR	BRI	TEX	MAR	TAL	CAL	RCH	CLT; DNQ	DOV	POC	MCH	SON	DAY	CHI	NHA	POC	IND	GLN	MCH	BRI	CAL	RCH	NHA	DOV	TAL	KAN	CLT	MAR	ATL	PHO	DAR	HOM	NA	-	

==== Busch Series ====
NASCAR Busch Series results
Year	Team	No.	Make	1	2	3	4	5	6	7	8	9	10	11	12	13	14	15	16	17	18	19	20	21	22	23	24	25	26	27	28	29	30	31	32	33	34	NBSC	Pts	Ref
2001	Jimmy Craig	86	Chevy	DAY	CAR	LVS	ATL	DAR	BRI	TEX	NSH	TAL	CAL	RCH	NHA	NZH	CLT	DOV	KEN	MLW	GLN	CHI	GTY	PPR	IRP	MCH	BRI	DAR	RCH	DOV	KAN	CLT; DNQ	MEM	PHO	CAR; 39	HOM; DNQ		140th	46	
2002	Jimmy Craig	86	Chevy	DAY; 29	CAR	LVS	DAR	BRI	TEX	NSH; 26	TAL	CAL	RCH	NHA	NZH	CLT; 42	DOV	NSH; DNQ	KEN; DNQ	MLW	DAY	CHI	GTY	PPR	IRP	MCH	BRI	DAR	RCH	DOV	KAN	CLT; DNQ	MEM	ATL	CAR; DNQ	PHO	HOM	83rd	198	
2003	Jimmy Craig	86	Chevy	DAY; 19	CAR; DNQ	LVS	DAR	BRI	TEX	TAL	NSH	CAL	RCH	GTY	NZH	CLT; 16	DOV	NSH	KEN	MLW	DAY	CHI	NHA	PPR	IRP	MCH	BRI	DAR	RCH	DOV	KAN	CLT; 22	MEM	ATL	PHO	CAR	HOM	77th	318	

=== ARCA Re/Max Series ===
(key) (Bold – Pole position awarded by qualifying time. Italics – Pole position earned by points standings or practice time. * – Most laps led.)

ARCA Re/Max Series results
Year	Team	No.	Make	1	2	3	4	5	6	7	8	9	10	11	12	13	14	15	16	17	18	19	20	21	22	ARMC	Pts	Ref
2000	Harrah Racing	55	Ford	DAY	SLM	AND	CLT; 13	KIL	FRS	MCH	POC	TOL	KEN	BLN	POC	WIN	ISF	KEN	DSF	SLM						80th	245	
2000	Jimmy Craig	55	Ford																		CLT; 30	TAL	ATL			80th	245	
2002	Jimmy Craig	55	Ford	DAY	ATL	NSH	SLM	KEN	CLT; 1	KAN	POC	MCH	TOL	SBO	KEN	BLN	POC	NSH	ISF	WIN	DSF	CHI	SLM	TAL	CLT; 8	72nd	425	
2003	Jimmy Craig	55	Ford	DAY	ATL; 36	NSH; 4	SLM	TOL	KEN	CLT; 2	BLN	KAN	MCH	LER	POC	POC	NSH	ISF	WIN	DSF	CHI	SLM	TAL	CLT; 11	SBO	42nd	675	

=== CARS Super Late Model Tour ===
(key)

CARS Super Late Model Tour results
Year	Team	No.	Make	1	2	3	4	5	6	7	8	9	10	CSLMTC	Pts	Ref
2016	LFR Development Group	40	Chevy	SNM; 9	ROU	HCY	TCM	GRE	ROU	CON	MYB	HCY	SNM	45th	24	
2018	Chris Walker	54F	Toyota	MYB; 1*	NSH	ROU	HCY	BRI	AND	HCY	ROU	SBO		29th	35	
2020	Chris Walker	15F	Toyota	SNM	HCY	JEN	HCY; 12	FCS	BRI	FLC	NSH			30th	22	
2021	Chris Walker	32	Toyota	HCY	GPS; 7	NSH	JEN	HCY	MMS	TCM	SBO			25th	26	

=== CARS Pro Late Model Tour ===
(key)

CARS Pro Late Model Tour results
Year	Team	No.	Make	1	2	3	4	5	6	7	8	9	10	11	12	13	CPLMTC	Pts	Ref
2023	Walker Motorsports	4	Chevy	SNM	HCY	ACE	NWS	TCM	DIL	CRW	WKS	HCY	TCM	SBO; 15	TCM	CRW	61st	18	

=== SMART Modified Tour ===
SMART Modified Tour results
Year	Car owner	No.	Make	1	2	3	4	5	6	7	8	9	10	11	12	13	SMTC	Pts	Ref
2003	N/A	00	N/A	CRW; 2	SUM	CRW	UMP; 11	UMP	CRW	MYB	ACE	CRW	UMP	CON	UMP		32nd	300	
2021	N/A	00	N/A	CRW; 6	FLO	SBO	FCS	CRW	DIL	CAR	CRW	DOM	PUL	HCY	ACE		33rd	25	
2022	N/A	03	N/A	FLO	SNM	CRW	SBO; 28	FCS	CRW	NWS	NWS	CAR	DOM	HCY	TRI	PUL	56th	3	
