= Donny Lia =

American racing driver

- Born: Domenick Anthony Lia; November 8, 1978 (age 48); Brooklyn, New York, U.S.
- Achievements: 2004, 2005, 2006, 2007 Race of Champions winner 2007, 2009 Whelen Modified Tour Champion

NASCAR O'Reilly Auto Parts Series career
- 1 race run over 1 year
- Best finish: 150th (2009)
- First race: 2009 Carquest Auto Parts 300 (Charlotte)
Wins	Top tens	Poles
0	0	0

NASCAR FedEx Freight Truck Series career
- 39 races run over 3 years
- Best finish: 18th (2008)
- First race: 2007 New Hampshire 200 (New Hampshire)
- Last race: 2010 Smith's 350 (Las Vegas)
- First win: 2008 Ohio 250 (Mansfield)
Wins	Top tens	Poles
1	4	0
- Statistics up to date as of September 20, 2022.

Domenick “Donny” Anthony Lia (born November 8, 1978) is an American stock car racing driver. He won the 2007 and 2009 NASCAR Whelen Modified Tour championships. He also won the Race of Champions Modified Tour races in 2004, 2005, 2006, and 2007. He has raced on the national level in the ARCA Re/Max Series (now ARCA Racing Series), Camping World Truck Series, and the Nationwide Series.

== Early and personal life ==
Lia owns several car dealerships in the Long Island area. Before he began his racing career, Lia competed in Sim-Racing against competitors all over the world, before the start of his career in 1999. He is also an eighteen-time national and international champion in the Radio-Controlled Model Racing Industry, and owns the largest RC On-Road Indoor Racetrack in the United States which he enjoys with his two sons, Michael and Domenick Jr. After retiring in 2017, Lia took a five year hiatus from racing until he returned to the NASCAR Whelen Modified Series in 2022.

== Racing career ==
In 1999, Lia began racing a Legends car at Wall Stadium (Wall, New Jersey). He won several times including the track's biggest event, the prestigious Turkey Derby. In 2000, Lia continued racing his Legends car with success all over the eastern United States, scoring over twenty wins. He competed in the NASCAR Modified division at Riverhead Raceway (Riverhead, New York) and he won Rookie of the Year honors in 2001. He also made his NASCAR Modified Tour debut at Martinsville Speedway. The 2002 season was spent gaining experience for a full-time move to the NASCAR Modified Tour in 2003.

He placed in the top ten in NASCAR Featherlite Modified Series (previous name of the Whelen Modified Tour) points in 2003 on his way to another Rookie of the Year award. He claimed five poles in 2004, more than any other competitor, which earned him the Bud Pole Award. He also competed on the Race of Champions Modified Tour, taking a big victory in the second-annual North-South Shootout at Concord Motorsport Park in North Carolina. Lia continued racing his Modifieds in 2005, winning two Whelen Modified Tour races and finishing sixth in WMT season points.

In 2006, he was given his first opportunity to race in a non-modified stock car. He practiced and qualified for the Nashville Superspeedway event in the ARCA series. He won one event on the Whelen Modified Tour and two pole positions, and he won three unsanctioned events.

The next season (2007), he was signed by legendary Nascar team owner Bob Garbarino, to drive the iconic Mystic Missile out of Mystic, Ct. They went on to have one of the most dominant seasons in NASCAR’s modern era (to that point)- winning six Whelen Modified Tour races including the events at Martinsville, two at Stafford, Thompson, New Hampshire, and Riverhead. He clinched the season points championship before the final race. On September 15, 2007, he made his first appearance in the NASCAR Craftsman Truck Series. He raced in the Bill Davis Racing No. 36 Toyota at New Hampshire, finishing twentieth.

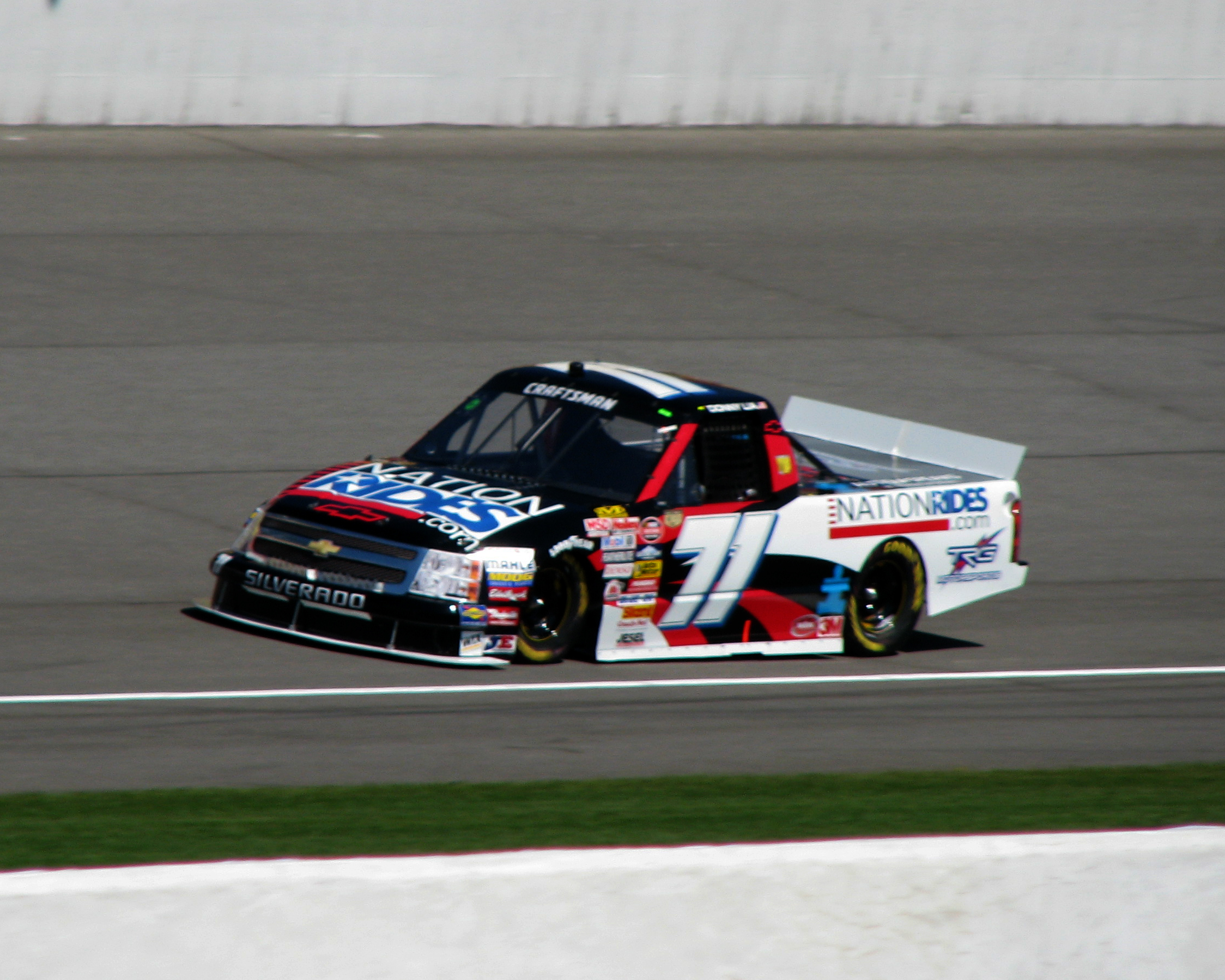
2008 truck

Lia had been set to drive for HT Motorsports in the No. 59 Toyota in late 2007, and drove at Homestead hoping for a full 2008 season. However, sponsorship did not pan out, and instead joined The Racer's Group (TRG) for the 2008 season, driving Kevin Buckler's No. 71 The Racer's Group/Nationrides.com/Zurich North America Chevrolet Silverado starting at Auto Club Speedway (he was ineligible to race at Daytona because of minimum driver proficiency rules, with Mike Bliss running the race). He had his first top-ten finish at Martinsville Speedway when he finished ninth. He scored his first Craftsman Truck Series win at Mansfield in the Ohio 250 on May 24, 2008 by nudging race leader David Starr out of the way on the final lap. He was the first rookie to win a Truck Series event since Carl Edwards in the 2003 season. He was the also the first driver from Riverhead, New York to win a NASCAR national series race since Steve Park's final Cup Series win in 2001. Late in the season, Lia resigned from TRG, and signed to drive for Randy Moss Motorsports for seven of the final eight races of the season.

Lia returned to the Mystic Missile in the Whelen Modified Tour in 2009, winning four times and winning his second championship. He drove a part-time schedule in the No. 07 and No. 21 Chevrolet Silverados for SS-Green Light Racing in the Truck Series in 2010. He then ran three truck races for Stringer Motorsports near the end of the season.

== Motorsports career results ==
=== NASCAR ===
(key) (Bold – Pole position awarded by qualifying time. Italics – Pole position earned by points standings or practice time. * – Most laps led.)

==== Nationwide Series ====
NASCAR Nationwide Series results
Year	Team	No.	Make	1	2	3	4	5	6	7	8	9	10	11	12	13	14	15	16	17	18	19	20	21	22	23	24	25	26	27	28	29	30	31	32	33	34	35	NNSC	Pts	Ref
2009	SK Motorsports	07	Toyota	DAY	CAL	LVS	BRI	TEX	NSH	PHO	TAL	RCH	DAR	CLT; 43	DOV	NSH	KEN	MLW	NHA	DAY	CHI	GTY	IRP	IOW	GLN	MCH	BRI	CGV	ATL	RCH	DOV	KAN	CAL	CLT	MEM	TEX	PHO	HOM	150th	34	

==== Camping World Truck Series ====
NASCAR Camping World Truck Series results
Year	Team	No.	Make	1	2	3	4	5	6	7	8	9	10	11	12	13	14	15	16	17	18	19	20	21	22	23	24	25	NCWTC	Pts	Ref
2007	Bill Davis Racing	36	Toyota	DAY	CAL	ATL	MAR	KAN	CLT	MFD	DOV	TEX	MCH	MLW	MEM	KEN	IRP	NSH	BRI	GTW	NHA; 20	LVS	TAL	MAR	ATL	TEX	PHO		75th	191	
2007	HT Motorsports	59	Toyota																									HOM; 25	75th	191	
2008	TRG Motorsports	71	Chevy	DAY	CAL; 26	ATL; 20	MAR; 9	KAN; 12	CLT; 34	MFD; 1	DOV; 17	TEX; 19	MCH; 12	MLW; 22	MEM; 26	KEN; 20	IRP; 9	NSH; 16	BRI; 12	GTW									18th	2466	
2008	Randy Moss Motorsports	81	Chevy																		NHA; 29	LVS; 10	TAL	MAR; 28	ATL; 17	TEX; 14	PHO; 16	HOM; 16	18th	2466	
2010	SS-Green Light Racing	21	Dodge	DAY; 30																									21st	1500	
2010	SS-Green Light Racing	07	Chevy		ATL; 16	MAR	NSH; 22	KAN	DOV; 19	CLT; 26	TEX		IOW; 26	GTY	IRP			DAR; 25											21st	1500	
2010	SS-Green Light Racing	07	Dodge									MCH; 13																	21st	1500	
2010	SS-Green Light Racing	21	Chevy													POC; 22	NSH; 12												21st	1500	
2010	SS-Green Light Racing	07	Toyota																BRI; 30	CHI									21st	1500	
2010	Stringer Motorsports	90	Toyota																		KEN; 18	NHA; 12	LVS; 28	MAR	TAL	TEX	PHO	HOM	21st	1500	

==== Busch North Series ====
NASCAR Busch North Series results
Year	Team	No.	Make	1	2	3	4	5	6	7	8	9	10	11	12	13	NBNSC	Pts	Ref
2005	Solhem Racing	00	Chevy	STA	HOL	ERI	NHA	WFD	ADI	STA	DUB	OXF	NHA; 28	DOV	LRP	TMP	59th	79	

==== Whelen Southern Modified Tour ====
NASCAR Whelen Southern Modified Tour results
Year	Car owner	No.	Make	1	2	3	4	5	6	7	8	9	10	11	12	13	14	NSWMTC	Pts	Ref
2011	John Lukosavage	01	Chevy	CRW	HCY	SBO	CRW	CRW	BGS	BRI	CRW	LGY	THO; 8	TRI	CRW	CLT	CRW	31st	147	

=== ARCA Racing Series ===
(key) (Bold – Pole position awarded by qualifying time. Italics – Pole position earned by points standings or practice time. * – Most laps led.)

ARCA Racing Series results
Year	Team	No.	Make	1	2	3	4	5	6	7	8	9	10	11	12	13	14	15	16	17	18	19	20	21	22	23	ARSC	Pts	Ref
2006	Hagans Racing	9	Dodge	DAY	NSH; 37	SLM	WIN	KEN; 41	TOL	POC	MCH	KAN	KEN	BLN	POC	GTW	NSH	MCH	ISF	MIL	TOL	DSF	CHI	SLM	TAL	IOW	155th	75	
2010	Venturini Motorsports	55	Toyota	DAY	PBE	SLM	TEX	TAL	TOL	POC	MCH	IOW	MFD	POC; 39	BLN	NJE	ISF	CHI	DSF	TOL	SLM	KAN	CAR				138th	35	

Sporting positions
Preceded by Ted Christopher	NASCAR Whelen Modified Tour Champion; 2009	Succeeded by Bobby Santos III
Preceded by Mike Stefanik	NASCAR Whelen Modified Tour Champion; 2007	Succeeded by Ted Christopher
