= J. B. Fortin =

American racing driver

- Nationality: American
- Born: December 7, 1993 (age 32) Holtsville, New York, U.S.

NASCAR Whelen Modified Tour career
- Debut season: 2018
- Current team: Nicole Fortin
- Years active: 2018–2024
- Car number: 34
- Crew chief: Ken Lecher
- Starts: 67
- Championships: 0
- Wins: 0
- Poles: 0
- Best finish: 10th in 2022
- Finished last season: 48th (2024)
- Statistics up to date as of April 16, 2025.

John "J. B." Fortin Jr. (born December 7, 1993) is an American professional stock car racing driver who last competed part-time in the NASCAR Whelen Modified Tour, driving the No. 34 for Nicole Fortin.

On July 12, 2023, Fortin was suspended by NASCAR after he physically fought a NASCAR official after the race at Wall Stadium. He was reinstated by NASCAR on September 15.

Fortin has previously competed in series such as the SMART Modified Tour, and the Tri-Track Open Modified Series.

== Motorsports results ==
=== NASCAR ===
(key) (Bold – Pole position awarded by qualifying time. Italics – Pole position earned by points standings or practice time. * – Most laps led.)

==== Whelen Modified Tour ====
NASCAR Whelen Modified Tour results
Year	Car owner	No.	Make	1	2	3	4	5	6	7	8	9	10	11	12	13	14	15	16	17	18	NWMTC	Pts	Ref
2018	Nicole Fortin	34	Chevy	MYR	TMP	STA	SEE	TMP	LGY	RIV; 19	NHA	STA	TMP	BRI	OSW	RIV	NHA	STA	TMP			55th	25	
2019	Nicole Fortin	34	Chevy	MYR	SBO; 21	TMP; 21	STA; 12	WAL; 20	SEE; 16	TMP; 21	RIV; 19	NHA; 29	STA; 24	TMP; 25	OSW; 21	RIV; 7	NHA; 20	STA; 17	TMP; 16			15th	371	
2020	Nicole Fortin	34	Chevy	JEN; 23	WMM; 17	WMM; 12	JEN; 19	MND; 24	TMP; 13	NHA; 16	STA; 25	TMP										18th	203	
2021	Nicole Fortin	34	Chevy	MAR; 34	STA; 16	RIV; 20	JEN; 8	OSW; 18	RIV; 13	NHA; 19	NRP; 8	STA; 17	BEE; 10	OSW; 17	RCH; 16	RIV; 16	STA; 18					11th	386	
2022	Nicole Fortin	34	Chevy	NSM; 14	RCH; 14	RIV	LEE; 8	JEN; 3	MND; 14	RIV; 25	WAL; 22	NHA; 16	CLM; 16	TMP; 24	LGY; 11	OSW; 22	RIV; 23	TMP; 20	MAR; 10			10th	418	
2023	Nicole Fortin	34	Chevy	NSM; 16	RCH; 2	MON; 12	RIV; 6	LEE; 14	SEE; 6	RIV; 12	WAL; 19	NHA	LMP	THO	LGY	OSW	MON	RIV; 17	NWS; 13	THO; 20	MAR; 7	15th	384	
2024	Nicole Fortin	34	Chevy	NSM; 21	RCH	THO	MON	RIV; 4	SEE	NHA	MON	LMP	THO	OSW	RIV	MON	THO	NWS	MAR			48th	63	

=== SMART Modified Tour ===
SMART Modified Tour results
Year	Car owner	No.	Make	1	2	3	4	5	6	7	8	9	10	11	12	13	SMTC	Pts	Ref
2022	Nicole Fortin	34	N/A	FLO	SNM	CRW	SBO; 10	FCS	CRW	NWS	NWS	CAR	DOM	HCY	TRI	PUL	42nd	22	
