= Justin Bonsignore =

American auto racing driver (born 1988)

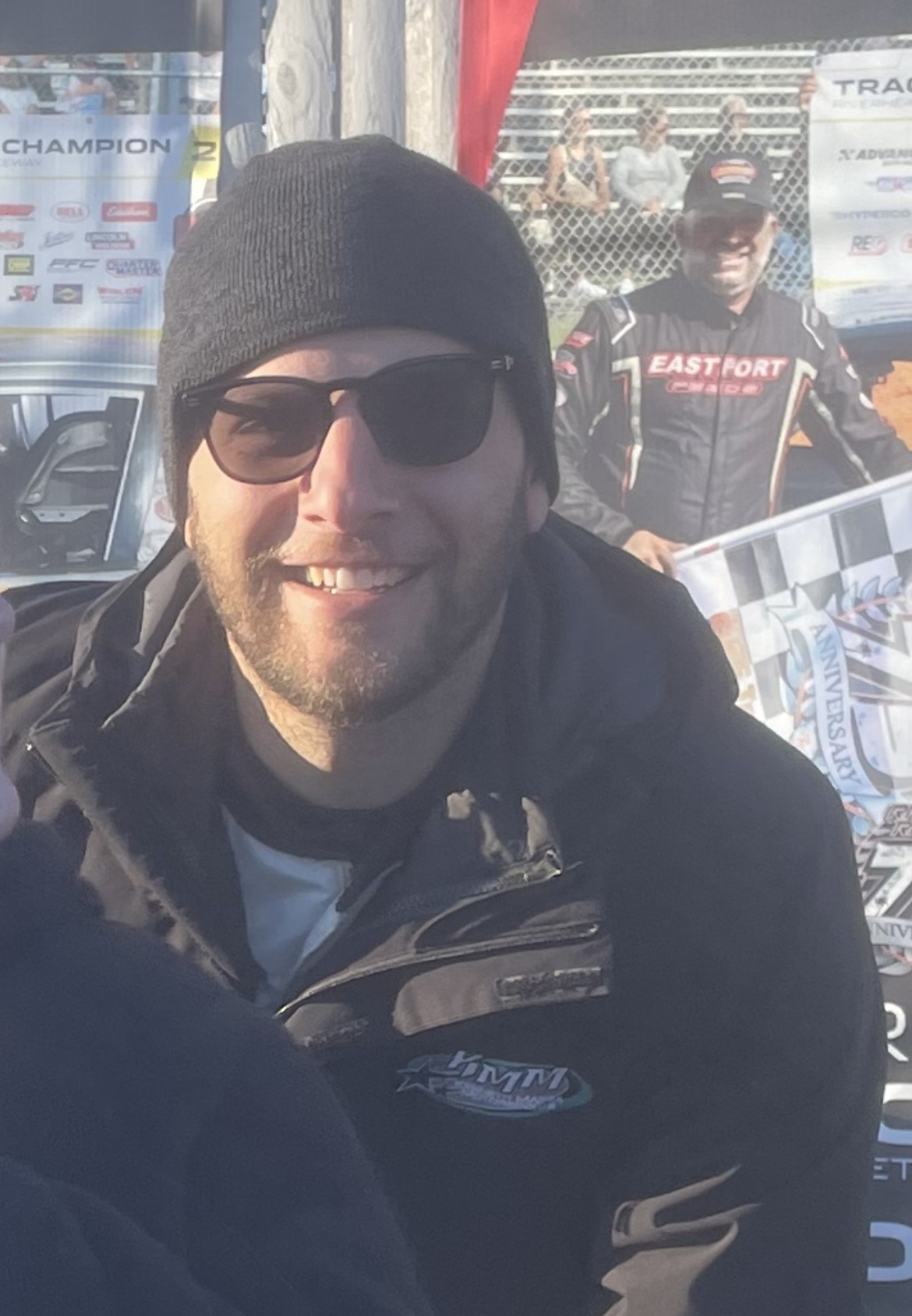
- Bonsignore at Riverhead Raceway in 2026
- Born: Justin R. Bonsignore; February 3, 1988 (age 38) Holtsville, New York, U.S.

NASCAR Whelen Modified Tour career
- Debut season: 2007
- Current team: Kenneth Massa Motorsports
- Years active: 2007–present
- Car number: 51
- Crew chief: Ryan Stone
- Starts: 249
- Championships: 4
- Wins: 48
- Poles: 42
- Best finish: 1st in 2018, 2020, 2021 and 2024
- Finished last season: 16th (2026)

Championship titles
- 2018, 2020, 2021, 2024 NASCAR Whelen Modified Tour Champion

NASCAR O'Reilly Auto Parts Series career
- 10 races run over 2 years
- 2025 position: 36th
- Best finish: 36th (2025)
- First race: 2024 SciAps 200 (New Hampshire)
- Last race: 2025 NASCAR Xfinity Series Championship Race (Phoenix)
Wins	Top tens	Poles
0	2	0

ARCA Menards Series career
- 1 race run over 1 year
- Best finish: 114th (2024)
- First race: 2024 Hard Rock Bet 200 (Daytona)
Wins	Top tens	Poles
0	0	0
- Statistics up to date as of October 12, 2026.

Justin R. Bonsignore (born February 3, 1988) is an American professional stock car racing driver. He competes part-time in the NASCAR Whelen Modified Tour, driving the No. 51 Chevrolet for Kenneth Massa Motorsports He has also competed in the NASCAR Xfinity Series, having previously driven the Nos. 18/19 Toyota GR Supras for Joe Gibbs Racing.

== Early career and go-karts ==
Bonsignore began his racing career with go-karts at the age of eight. His family has long owned and operated a Kart Racing Shop, and this early exposure to the racing circuit paved the way for a career in racing.

In 1997, Bonsignore competed for his first national event at the Rockingham Speedway, in North Carolina, where he finished thirteenth. During his go-kart career, Bonsignore has secured eighteen national event wins, thirteen poles, and 45 top-five finishes in 81 national starts. Highlights include wins at Len Sammon's Indoor Kart Race at the Dunkin' Donuts Center in Providence, Rhode Island and the East End Shootout at Riverhead Raceway.

== Chargers and modified ==
In 2005, Bonsignore began racing stock cars. Competing in Riverhead Raceway's Charger Division, and NASCAR Dodge Weekly Racing Series, Bonsignore finished third in the series standings, was awarded Rookie of the Year, and secured the best rookie finish on record.

In 2006, Bonsignore joined the NASCAR Modified Division, where he scored three top-fives and nine top-ten finishes. For the second year in a row, Bonsignore received honors from NASCAR, taking home the Rookie of the Year title for the Modified Division and claiming a seventh-place finish overall, a new best for a rookie driver.

Hopes for a higher finish in 2007 were cut short due to a wrist injury.

2008 saw Bonsignore's first stock car win in 2008 and the division's most top-five and top-five finishes en route to an 8th-place points finish.

2009 proved a very successful season performance wise, but bad luck kept overall results below expectations. During the season, Bonsignore broke a long winless streak and won the Cromarty Cup 50 Lap race, qualifying on the pole and leading every lap.

In the NASCAR Whelen Modified Tour race at Riverhead, Bonsignore was able to match a career-best fourth-place finish.

== M3 Technology Racing ==
2009 also marked the first collaboration between Bonsignore and local business owner Ken Massa. During the summer, the two discussed and formed a team with the intention of competing full-time on the NASCAR Whelen Modified Tour. In the team's first race together, they scored a second-place finish at the Sundance Vacations Speedway in St. John's, PA (the former and later Mountain Speedway; to be called Evergreen Raceway Park starting in 2014) in the King of the Mountain 150.

The 2010 season showed the promise of the new team, as Bonsignore was named the 2010 Sunoco Rookie of the Year. Finishing a strong thirteenth in the standings, a series of mechanical accidents and bad luck ruined a potential top-ten run. Bonsignore became the first NASCAR Whelen Modified Tour driver to earn a Coors Light Pole Award at Bristol Motor Speedway and Stafford Motor Speedway. 2010 saw the M3 Racing team take home two top-five finishes, and four top-ten finishes.

M3 Technology and Bonsignore returned to the Tour for the 2011 season, and once again competed throughout the year at Riverhead Raceway. On July 30, 2011, Bonsignore won his first Whelen Modified Tour race at his local track, Riverhead Raceway. He started on the outside pole and led the final 158 laps in dominating fashion. Bonsignore also won the NASCAR Weekly Series Modified championship at Riverhead Raceway, clinching that on September 10, 2011.

In 2012 and 2013, Bonsignore finished seventh and eighth in the points respectively, picking up two more wins at Thompson Speedway Motorsports Park and Monadnock Speedway.

2014 saw a change for Bonsignore and the M3 Technology team as they would switch from Troyer to Spafco Chassis and Robert Yates Racing Spec engines. Performance improved as Bonsignore won three races on the way to a third-place finish in points. In addition to running the WMT, Bonsignore also raced on the Modified Racing Series for the legendary Art Barry in the #21 car, winning the series championship. Winning speed returned in 2015, with two more race wins, however, the team lacked consistency on the way to a tenth-place finish in points.

The 2016 season proved to be a career year at the time for Bonsignore, scoring four wins and thirteen top-fives on the way to a runner-up points finish to Doug Coby. 2017 was not as kind, with Bonsignore going winless for the first time since 2010, only leading four laps all season.

2018 was another year of change for the No. 51 team. The team switched chassis manufacturers again to the potent FURY Chassis, bringing in Ryan Stone as crew chief. These changes paid off as Bonsignore won the 2018 NASCAR Whelen Modified Tour championship on the strength of eight wins, five poles, twelve top-fives, fifteen top-tens, and 695 laps led, leading every category.

=== ARCA Menards Series ===
On February 5, 2024, it was announced that Bonsignore would make his ARCA Menards Series debut at Daytona International Speedway, driving the No. 30 car for Rette Jones Racing. Bonsignore had competed in the ARCA testing session for Fast Track Racing earlier in the year.

=== NASCAR Xfinity Series ===
On May 16, 2024, it was announced that Bonsignore will compete in the NASCAR Xfinity Series race at New Hampshire in June, driving the No. 19 for Joe Gibbs Racing. After qualifying was rained out, Bonsignore lead three laps and ran in the top-five before a late incident relegated him to a 22nd-place finish. In January 2025, it was revealed that Bonsignore would compete in five Xfinity Series races for Joe Gibbs Racing during the 2025 season. The following month, the team announced an expansion of his schedule to nine races. Bonsignore also ran the No. 18 car in the final two races at Martinsville and Phoenix when William Sawalich was sidelined after post-concussion symptoms from the previous race.

== Motorsports career results ==
=== NASCAR ===
(key) (Bold – Pole position awarded by qualifying time. Italics – Pole position earned by points standings or practice time. * – Most laps led.)

==== Xfinity Series ====
NASCAR Xfinity Series results
Year	Team	No.	Make	1	2	3	4	5	6	7	8	9	10	11	12	13	14	15	16	17	18	19	20	21	22	23	24	25	26	27	28	29	30	31	32	33	NXSC	Pts	Ref
2024	Joe Gibbs Racing	19	Toyota	DAY	ATL	LVS	PHO	COA	RCH	MAR	TEX	TAL	DOV	DAR	CLT	PIR	SON	IOW	NHA; 22	NSH	CSC	POC	IND	MCH	DAY	DAR	ATL	GLN	BRI	KAN	TAL	ROV	LVS	HOM	MAR	PHO	59th	25	
2025	Joe Gibbs Racing	19	Toyota	DAY; 25	ATL	COA	PHO	LVS	HOM; 16	MAR	DAR	BRI; 17	CAR; 38	TAL	TEX	CLT	NSH	MXC	POC; 38	ATL	CSC	SON	DOV	IND	IOW; 12	GLN	DAY	PIR	GTW	BRI	KAN; 37	ROV	LVS	TAL			36th	136	
2025	Joe Gibbs Racing	18	Toyota																																MAR; 10	PHO; 10	36th	136	

==== Whelen Modified Tour ====
NASCAR Whelen Modified Tour results
Year	Car owner	No.	Make	1	2	3	4	5	6	7	8	9	10	11	12	13	14	15	16	17	18	NWMTC	Pts	Ref
2007	Thomas Bonsignore	23	Chevy	TMP	STA	WTO	STA	TMP	NHA	TSA	RIV; 4	STA	TMP	MAN	MAR	NHA	TMP	STA	TMP			53rd	160	
2008	Thomas Bonsignore	23		TMP	STA	STA	TMP	NHA	SPE	RIV; DNQ	STA	TMP	MAN	TMP	NHA	MAR	CHE	STA	TMP			N/A	0	
2009	Thomas Bonsignore	51	Chevy	TMP	STA	STA	NHA	SPE	RIV; 4	STA	BRI	TMP	NHA	MAR	STA	TMP						49th	160	
2010	Kenneth Massa	51	Chevy	TMP; 27	STA; 10	STA; 11	MAR; 2	NHA; 12	LIM; 21	MND; 9	RIV; 17	STA; 25	**TMP**; 24	**BRI**; 5	NHA; 27	STA; 29	TMP; 22					13th	1587	
2011	Kenneth Massa	51	Chevy	TMP; 5	STA; 28	STA; 17	MND; 2	TMP; 24	NHA; 31	RIV; 1*	STA; 11	NHA; 4	BRI; 2	DEL; 7	TMP; 10	LRP; 3	NHA; 3	**STA**; 10*	TMP; 21			7th	2141	
2012	Kenneth Massa	51	Chevy	TMP; 13		MND; 4	STA; 10	WFD; 2	NHA; 28	STA; 10	TMP; 25	BRI; 4	TMP; 1	RIV; 2	NHA; 25	STA; 11	TMP; 19					7th	460	
2012	Kenneth Massa	51	Ford		STA; 6																	7th	460	
2013	Kenneth Massa	51	Chevy	TMP; 8	STA; 2	STA; 7	WFD; 4	RIV; 24	NHA; 32	MND; 1*	STA; 15	TMP; 20	BRI; 8	RIV; 2	NHA; 14	STA; 5	TMP; 10					8th	464	
2014	Kenneth Massa	51	Chevy	TMP; 1	STA; 5	STA; 2	WFD; 4	RIV; 16	NHA; 6	**MND**; 1	STA; 8	TMP; 1	**BRI**; 6	NHA; 25	STA; 21	TMP; 5						3rd	484	
2015	Kenneth Massa	51	Chevy	TMP; 27	STA; 20	WFD; 25	STA; 28	TMP; 2	RIV; 1*	NHA; 22	MND; 3	STA; 5	TMP; 8	BRI; 24	RIV; 1*	NHA; 5	STA; 21	TMP; 2				10th	478	
2016	Kenneth Massa	51	Chevy	TMP; 3	STA; 5	WFD; 17	STA; 5	TMP; 20	RIV; 2	NHA; 8	MND; 5	STA; 2	TMP; 1*	BRI; 22	RIV; 1*	OSW; 3	SEE; 2	NHA; 1*	STA; 2	TMP; 1		2nd	672	
2017	Kenneth Massa	51	Chevy	MYR; 6	TMP; 9	STA; 9	LGY; 5	TMP; 14	RIV; 5	NHA; 17	STA; 3	TMP; 11	BRI; 3	SEE; 6	OSW; 6	RIV; 5	NHA; 5	STA; 6	TMP; 10			3rd	588	
2018	Kenneth Massa	51	Chevy	MYR; 5	TMP; 1	STA; 8	**SEE**; 1*	TMP; 1	LGY; 2	**RIV**; 1	NHA; 4*	STA; 7	**TMP**; 1*	**BRI**; 1*	OSW; 2	RIV; 1	NHA; 6*	STA; 12	TMP; 1			1st	693	
2019	Kenneth Massa	51	Chevy	MYR; 12	SBO; 25	TMP; 1	**STA**; 6*	**WAL**; 13	SEE; 2	TMP; 1	RIV; 1	NHA; 7	STA; 6	TMP; 2	OSW; 1*	RIV; 1	NHA; 5	STA; 2*	TMP; 1			2nd	653	
2020	Kenneth Massa	51	Chevy	**JEN**; 1*	WMM; 1	WMM; 5	**JEN**; 5*	MND; 1	TMP; 2	NHA; 2*	STA; 3	TMP; 3										1st	392	
2021	Kenneth Massa	51	Chevy	MAR; 3	STA; 13	**RIV**; 3*	**JEN**; 1*	OSW; 4	**RIV**; 3	**NHA**; 2*	NRP; 2	STA; 2	BEE; 8	OSW; 3	**RCH**; 24	RIV; 2	STA; 1					1st	565	
2022	Kenneth Massa	51	Chevy	NSM; 31	RCH; 1	RIV; 25	LEE; 10	JEN; 8	MND; 1	RIV; 2	WAL; 6	NHA; 12	CLM; 6	TMP; 5	LGY; 5	OSW; 1	**RIV**; 1*	TMP; 14	MAR; 29			4th	568	
2023	Kenneth Massa	51	Chevy	NSM; 2	RCH; 4	**MON**; 5	**RIV**; 1	LEE; 9	SEE; 4	RIV; 2	WAL; 2	**NHA**; 1*	**LMP**; 4	THO; 1*	LGY; 3	**OSW**; 15*	**MON**; 1*	**RIV**; 1	NWS; 3	THO; 13	MAR; 2	2nd	750	
2024	Kenneth Massa	51	Chevy	NSM; 2	RCH; 1*	**THO**; 4	MON; 6	RIV; 3	SEE; 5	NHA; 1*	MON; 7	LMP; 3	THO; 2	OSW; 3	**RIV**; 15*	MON; 8	THO; 1*	NWS; 1*	**MAR**; 1*			1st	672	
2025	Kenneth Massa	51	Chevy	NSM; 3	THO; 5	NWS; 3	SEE; 11	**RIV**; 1*	WMM; 10	LMP; 8	MON; 4	MON; 2	THO; 8	**RCH**; 7	OSW; 10	**NHA**; 2*	RIV; 3	**THO**; 6	**MAR**; 1*			2nd	641	
2026	Kenneth Massa	51	Chevy	**NSM**; 1*	MAR; 24	THO; 7	**SEE**; 11	RIV; 2	OXF; Wth	SEE	CLM	WMM	MON	THO	NHA; 24	**STA**; 4	OSW	**RIV**; 3	THO; Wth			16th	289	

^{*} Season still in progress
^{1} Ineligible for series points

=== ARCA Menards Series ===
(key) (Bold – Pole position awarded by qualifying time. Italics – Pole position earned by points standings or practice time. * – Most laps led.)

ARCA Menards Series results
Year	Team	No.	Make	1	2	3	4	5	6	7	8	9	10	11	12	13	14	15	16	17	18	19	20	AMSC	Pts	Ref
2024	Rette Jones Racing	30	Ford	DAY; 32	PHO	TAL	DOV	KAN	CLT	IOW	MOH	BLN	IRP	SLM	ELK	MCH	ISF	MLW	DSF	GLN	BRI	KAN	TOL	114th	12	

=== SMART Modified Tour ===
SMART Modified Tour results
Year	Car owner	No.	Make	1	2	3	4	5	6	7	8	9	10	11	12	13	14	SMTC	Pts	Ref
2024	Kenneth Massa	51	N/A	FLO	CRW	SBO	TRI	ROU	HCY	FCS	CRW	JAC	CAR	CRW	DOM	SBO	NWS; 1*	40th	50	
2026	Kenneth Massa	51	N/A	FLO	AND	SBO	DOM	HCY	WKS	FCR	CRW	PUL; 20	CAR	ROU	TRI	**NWS**; 14		42nd	48	

Sporting positions
Preceded by Doug Coby	NASCAR Whelen Modified Tour Champion; 2018	Succeeded by Doug Coby
Preceded by Doug Coby	NASCAR Whelen Modified Tour Champion; 2020	Succeeded by Justin Bonsignore
Preceded by Justin Bonsignore	NASCAR Whelen Modified Tour Champion; 2021	Succeeded by Jon McKennedy
Preceded by Ron Silk	NASCAR Whelen Modified Tour Champion; 2024	Succeeded by Austin Beers
