= 2019 NASCAR Whelen Modified Tour =

Auto racing season

The 2019 NASCAR Whelen Modified Tour was the thirty-fifth season of the Whelen Modified Tour (WMT), a stock car racing tour sanctioned by NASCAR. It began with the Performance Plus 150 presented by Safety-Kleen at Myrtle Beach Speedway on March 16 and concluded with the Sunoco World Series 150 at Thompson Speedway Motorsports Park on October 13. Justin Bonsignore entered the season as the defending drivers' champion. 2019 marked the third season of the unification of the Whelen (Northern) Modified Tour and the Whelen Southern Modified Tour. Doug Coby won the championship, his sixth, eight points ahead of Bonsignore.

== Drivers ==
No.	Manufacturer	Car Owner	Race Driver	Crew Chief
01	Chevrolet	Kenneth Fifield	Melissa Fifield	Kenneth Fifield 2
01	Chevrolet	Kenneth Fifield	Melissa Fifield	Jesse Prince 14
1	Chevrolet	Eddie Harvey	Burt Myers 4	Eddie Harvey
1	Chevrolet	Eddie Harvey	Jeff Rocco (R) 3	Eddie Harvey
1	Chevrolet	Eddie Harvey	Danny Bohn 1	Eddie Harvey
1	Chevrolet	Eddie Harvey	George Brunnhoelzl III 3	Eddie Harvey
1	Chevrolet	Eddie Harvey	Woody Pitkat 3	Eddie Harvey
2	Chevrolet	Mike Smeriglio III	Doug Coby	Phil Moran
3	Chevrolet	Jan Boehler	Matt Swanson	Greg Fournier
4	Chevrolet	Marty Edwards	Burt Myers 2	Tony Eury Jr. 1
4	Chevrolet	Marty Edwards	Burt Myers 2	Unknown 1
5	Chevrolet	Bob Ebersole 3	Kyle Ebersole 3	Bob Ebersole 3
5	Chevrolet	Mark Mina 3	John Beatty Jr. 3	Unknown 2
5	Chevrolet	Mark Mina 3	John Beatty Jr. 3	Ray Grewan 1
06	Chevrolet	Randy Rameau	Sam Rameau (R)	Danny Stebbins
6	Chevrolet	Ed Partridge	Ryan Preece 2	Jeff Preece
07	Chevrolet	Jennifer Emerling	Patrick Emerling	Jan Leaty
7	Chevrolet	Tommy Baldwin Jr.	Jon McKennedy 8	Tommy Baldwin Jr.
8	Toyota	Pat Kennedy	Roger Turbush (R) 2	Unknown 1
8	Toyota	Pat Kennedy	Roger Turbush (R) 2	Raymond Bouchard 1
9	Chevrolet	Sean Corsetti	Tom Rogers Jr. 1	Sean Corsetti
11	Chevrolet	Joe Yannone	Anthony Sesely 1	Unknown
12	Chevrolet	Stash Butova	J. R. Bertuccio 4	Stash Butova
14	Chevrolet	Richard Barney	Blake Barney	Robert Barney
15	Chevrolet	Rob Fuller	Kyle Benjamin 1	Steven Kopcik
16	Ford	Eric Sanderson	Timmy Solomito (Note: Timmy Solomito drove in the Musket 250 presented by Whelen and in the NAPA Fall Final 150 with car number x6, honoring Mike Stefanik who died in a plane crash on September 15.)	Sly Szaban
18	Ford	Robert Pollifrone	Ken Heagy	Greg Gorman 2
18	Ford	Robert Pollifrone	Ken Heagy	Desmond Gorman 14
19	Chevrolet	Steve Greer	Joey Cipriano III (R) 3	Earl Pelletier
20	Chevrolet	Bruce Bachta	Max Zachem 6	Max Zachem
21	Chevrolet	Joe Bertuccio Sr.	Jimmy Blewett 11	Stash Butova 3 Joe Bertuccio Sr. 13
21	Chevrolet	Joe Bertuccio Sr.	Chuck Hossfeld 5	Stash Butova 3 Joe Bertuccio Sr. 13
22	Chevrolet 1	Kyle Bonsignore	Kyle Bonsignore 8	Bobby Foley
22	Toyota 7	Kyle Bonsignore	Kyle Bonsignore 8	Bobby Foley
23	Chevrolet	Jason Sechrist	John Montesanto (R) 1	Jason Sechrist 1
23	Chevrolet	Jason Sechrist	Jacob Perry (R) 1	Dennis Perry 1
24	Chevrolet 1	Diane Krause	Andrew Krause 7	John Cooke 5
24	Toyota 6	Diane Krause	Andrew Krause 7	Robert Hyer 2
25	Chevrolet	Joe Carroll	Calvin Carroll	Joe Carroll
26	Chevrolet	Sean McDonald	Gary McDonald 7	Chad McDonald 4
26	Chevrolet	Sean McDonald	Gary McDonald 7	Unknown 3
32	Chevrolet	Dean Rypkema	Tyler Rypkema (R) 5	Unknown 2
32	Chevrolet	Dean Rypkema	Tyler Rypkema (R) 5	Zach Truesdail 3
33	Ford	Wade Cole	Wade Cole	Brian Crunden 2
33	Ford	Wade Cole	Wade Cole	Rick Rodenbaugh 14
34	Chevrolet	Nicole Fortin	J. B. Fortin (R) 15	Jason Blatz
35	Chevrolet 3	Mike Molleur	Andrew Molleur (R) 6	Unknown 2
35	Toyota 3	Mike Molleur	Andrew Molleur (R) 6	Ken Barry 4
36	Chevrolet 7 Dodge 9	Judy Thilberg	Dave Sapienza 6	Tommy Grasso
36	Chevrolet 7 Dodge 9	Judy Thilberg	Burt Myers 2	Tommy Grasso
36	Chevrolet 7 Dodge 9	Judy Thilberg	Frank Vigliarolo Jr. 1	Tommy Grasso
36	Chevrolet 7 Dodge 9	Judy Thilberg	Bobby Santos III 7	Tommy Grasso
38	Chevrolet	Linda Rodenbaugh	Kyle Ellwood 11	Bobby Bourne
38	Chevrolet	Linda Rodenbaugh	Dave Salzarulo 1	Bobby Bourne
38	Chevrolet	Linda Rodenbaugh	Mike Willis (R) 1	Bobby Bourne
40	Chevrolet	Frank Fleming	Frank Fleming 2	Talmage Thomas
41	Chevrolet	Kevin Shea	Kevin Shea (R) 2	Unknown 1
41	Chevrolet	Kevin Shea	Kevin Shea (R) 2	Brad Caddick 1
45	Chevrolet	Amy Catalano 3	Timmy Catalano (R)	Dave Catalano 3
45	Chevrolet	Dave Catalano 13	Timmy Catalano (R)	Zach Reissner 13
46	Chevrolet	Russell Goodale	Craig Lutz	Doug Ogiejko
47	Chevrolet	Frank Mucciacciaro	Joey Mucciacciaro (R) 8	Unknown 6
47	Chevrolet	Frank Mucciacciaro	Joey Mucciacciaro (R) 8	Joey Mucciacciaro 1
47	Chevrolet	Frank Mucciacciaro	Joey Mucciacciaro (R) 8	Kevin Crider 1
49	Chevrolet	Chris Young	Chris Young Jr. (R) 2	Chris Young
51	Chevrolet	Ken Massa	Justin Bonsignore	Ryan Stone
52	Chevrolet	Jason Nogiec	Mark Bakaj (R) 4	Unknown 1
52	Chevrolet	Jason Nogiec	Mark Bakaj (R) 4	Paul French 2
52	Chevrolet	Jason Nogiec	Mark Bakaj (R) 4	Jason Nogiec 1
54	Chevrolet	Amy Catalano	Tommy Catalano	Dave Catalano
55	Chevrolet 4 Dodge 1	Dawn Gerstner 2	Jeremy Gerstner 2	Grady Jeffreys Jr. 2
55	Chevrolet 4 Dodge 1	Susanne Lewis 3	Andy Jankowiak (Note: Andy Jankowiak entered the Musket 250 presented by Whelen with car number 41.) (R) 2	Steve Mendoza 3
55	Chevrolet 4 Dodge 1	Susanne Lewis 3	Matt Galko (R) 1	Steve Mendoza 3
57	Chevrolet	Bryan Dauzat	Todd Cooper (R) 2	Steve Mendoza
58	Chevrolet	Edgar Goodale	Eric Goodale	Jason Shephard
60	Chevrolet	Roy Hall	Matt Hirschman 3	Matt Hirschman 2
60	Chevrolet	Roy Hall	Matt Hirschman 3	Mike Stew 1
64	Chevrolet	Mike Murphy	Rob Summers	Steve Lemay 8
64	Chevrolet	Mike Murphy	Rob Summers	Russell Montgomery 8
70	Chevrolet	Steve Seuss 1	Andy Seuss 1	Steve Seuss 1
70	Chevrolet	Robert Pelis 1	Dylan Slepian (R) 1	Brian Magee 1
75	Chevrolet	Charles Pasteryak	Chris Pasteryak	Keith McDermott 4
75	Chevrolet	Charles Pasteryak	Chris Pasteryak	Cam McDermott 12
77	Chevrolet	Mike Curb	Gary Putnam 9	Teddy Musgrave Jr.
77	Chevrolet	Mike Curb	Jon McKennedy 1	Teddy Musgrave Jr.
77	Chevrolet	Mike Curb	Ryan Newman 1	Teddy Musgrave Jr.
78	Chevrolet	Steven Sutcliffe	Walter Sutcliffe Jr. 15	Unknown 1
78	Chevrolet	Steven Sutcliffe	Walter Sutcliffe Jr. 15	Kenneth Woodward 2
78	Chevrolet	Steven Sutcliffe	Walter Sutcliffe Jr. 15	Kevin Anderson 12
79	Chevrolet	Susan Hill	James Civali 1	David Hill
80	Chevrolet	Pamela Hulse	Tom Rogers Jr. 1	Unknown
82	Chevrolet	Danny Watts Jr.	Woody Pitkat 11	Jarod Zeltmann
82	Chevrolet	Danny Watts Jr.	Chase Dowling 3	Jarod Zeltmann
82	Chevrolet	Danny Watts Jr.	Tom Rogers Jr. 1	Jarod Zeltmann
82	Chevrolet	Danny Watts Jr.	Andy Seuss 1	Jarod Zeltmann
83	Chevrolet	Rick Rodenbaugh	Dave Salzarulo 2	John Blake 1
83	Chevrolet	Rick Rodenbaugh	Dave Salzarulo 2	Rick Rodenbaugh 1
84	Chevrolet	Nicole Fortin 2	John Fortin 2	Unknown 2
84	Chevrolet	Allie Brainard 3	Amy Catalano (R) 3	Dave Catalano 3
85	Chevrolet	Kevin Stuart	Ron Silk	Kenny Stuart
87	Chevrolet	Darryl Baker	John Baker (R) 1	Unknown
88	Chevrolet	Buzz Chew	Mike Rutkoski (R) 4	Aaron Clifford
92	Chevrolet	Anthony Nocella	Anthony Nocella 10	Steve Murphy
95	Chevrolet	Wayne Anderson	Kyle Soper (Note: Kyle Soper drove in the Miller Lite 200 with car number 15.) 2	Tom Soper
97	Chevrolet	Bryan Dauzat	Andy Seuss 1	Todd Cooper
97	Chevrolet	Bryan Dauzat	Bryan Dauzat 1	Todd Cooper
99	Chevrolet 3 Pontiac 6	Cheryl Tomaino	Jamie Tomaino 2	Cheryl Tomaino 1 George Ratajczak 5 Trey Tomaino 3
99	Chevrolet 3 Pontiac 6	Cheryl Tomaino	Chase Dowling 7	Cheryl Tomaino 1 George Ratajczak 5 Trey Tomaino 3

== Schedule ==
On November 21, 2018, NASCAR announced the 2019 schedule. Langley and Bristol were dropped from the schedule in favor of South Boston and Wall Stadium. The All-Star Shootout, held at New Hampshire, did not count towards the championship. Twelve of the seventeen races in the season were televised on NBCSN on a tape delay basis. All races in the season were shown live on FansChoice.tv.

No.	Race title	Track	Date
1	Performance Plus 150 presented by Safety-Kleen	Myrtle Beach Speedway, Myrtle Beach, South Carolina	March 16
2	South Boston 150	South Boston Speedway, South Boston, Virginia	March 30
3	Icebreaker 150	Thompson Speedway Motorsports Park, Thompson, Connecticut	April 7
4	NAPA Auto Parts Spring Sizzler 200	Stafford Motor Speedway, Stafford, Connecticut	May 11 (Note: The NAPA Auto Parts Spring Sizzler 200, which was originally scheduled for 28 April, was postponed three times due to expected heavy rain.)
5	Jersey Shore 150	Wall Stadium, Wall Township, New Jersey	May 18
6	Seekonk 150	Seekonk Speedway, Seekonk, Massachusetts	June 1
7	Thompson 125	Thompson Speedway Motorsports Park, Thompson, Connecticut	June 5
8	Buzz Chew Chevrolet Cadillac 200	Riverhead Raceway, Riverhead, New York	July 6
	All-Star Shootout	New Hampshire Motor Speedway, Loudon, New Hampshire	July 19
9	Eastern Propane & Oil 100	New Hampshire Motor Speedway, Loudon, New Hampshire	July 20
10	Stafford 150	Stafford Motor Speedway, Stafford, Connecticut	August 2
11	Bud 'King of Beers' 150	Thompson Speedway Motorsports Park, Thompson, Connecticut	August 14
12	Toyota Mod Classic 150 presented by McDonald's	Oswego Speedway, Oswego, New York	August 31
13	Miller Lite 200	Riverhead Raceway, Riverhead, New York	September 7
14	Musket 250 presented by Whelen	New Hampshire Motor Speedway, Loudon, New Hampshire	September 21
15	NAPA Fall Final 150	Stafford Motor Speedway, Stafford, Connecticut	September 29
16	Sunoco World Series 150	Thompson Speedway Motorsports Park, Thompson, Connecticut	October 13

== Results and standings ==
=== Races ===
No.	Race	Pole position	Most laps led	Winning driver	Manufacturer
1	Performance Plus 150 presented by Safety-Kleen	Doug Coby	Jon McKennedy	Doug Coby	Chevrolet
2	South Boston 150	Tommy Catalano	Burt Myers	Ron Silk	Chevrolet
3	Icebreaker 150	Doug Coby	Doug Coby	Justin Bonsignore	Chevrolet
4	NAPA Auto Parts Spring Sizzler 200	Justin Bonsignore	Chase Dowling	Doug Coby	Chevrolet
5	Jersey Shore 150	Justin Bonsignore	Doug Coby	Woody Pitkat	Chevrolet
6	Seekonk 150	Doug Coby	Doug Coby	Doug Coby	Chevrolet
7	Thompson 125	Doug Coby	Craig Lutz	Justin Bonsignore	Chevrolet
8	Buzz Chew Chevrolet Cadillac 200	Doug Coby	Doug Coby	Justin Bonsignore	Chevrolet
	All-Star Shootout	Craig Lutz^{1}	Craig Lutz	Patrick Emerling	Chevrolet
9	Eastern Propane & Oil 100	Jon McKennedy	Doug Coby	Ron Silk	Chevrolet
10	Stafford 150	Doug Coby	Doug Coby	Ron Silk	Chevrolet
11	Bud 'King of Beers' 150	Doug Coby	Doug Coby	Doug Coby	Chevrolet
12	Toyota Mod Classic 150 presented by McDonald's	Rob Summers	Justin Bonsignore	Justin Bonsignore	Chevrolet
13	Miller Lite 200	Craig Lutz	Tom Rogers Jr.	Justin Bonsignore	Chevrolet
14	Musket 250 presented by Whelen	Doug Coby	Jon McKennedy	Bobby Santos III	Dodge
15	NAPA Fall Final 150	Chris Pasteryak	Justin Bonsignore	Craig Lutz	Chevrolet
16	Sunoco World Series 150	Andrew Krause	Justin Bonsignore	Justin Bonsignore	Chevrolet

Notes

- ^{1} – There was no qualifying session for the All-Star Shootout. The starting grid was decided with a random draw.

=== Drivers' championship ===
(key) Bold – Pole position awarded by time. Italics – Pole position set by final practice results or Owners' points. * – Most laps led.

Pos.	Driver	MYR	SBO	THO	STA	WAL	SEE	THO	RIV	NHA‡	NHA	STA	THO	OSW	RIV	NHA	STA	THO	Points
1	Doug Coby	**1**	8	**5***	1	10*	**1***	**2**	**6***	12	2*	**3***	**1***	6	15	**3**	3	7	661
2	Justin Bonsignore	12	25	1	**6**	**13**	2	1	1	3	7	6	2	1*	1	5	2*	1*	653
3	Ron Silk	25	1	2	3	8	4	5	4	5	1	1	19	3	16	22	6	2	599
4	Craig Lutz	20	10	13	2	26	3	3*	5	6*	10	5	3	4	**3**	10	1	12	585
5	Matt Swanson	18	11	7	34	14	8	7	18	16	5	4	9	25	11	6	5	3	522
6	Eric Goodale	9	26	3	5	6	25	6	8	11	6	13	13	7	13	21	21	6	518
7	Timmy Solomito	28	9	15	9	25	5	13	3	8	11	25	5	8	2	13	13	10	513
8	Patrick Emerling	4	7	4	7	23	9	27	7	1	28	10	8	14	5	23	10	36	484
9	Chris Pasteryak	5	6	9	26	18	6	12	12		21	11	12	12	22	8	**11**	32	483
10	Blake Barney	13	13	16	10	2	15	19	20		14	18	14	19	20	17	14	17	463
11	Tommy Catalano	26	**17**	18	17	9	14	11	10	10	9	17	26	10	12	29	15	11	457
12	Woody Pitkat	19	12	8	11	1	11	10	13	17	34	15	10			12	8	5	451
13	Rob Summers	22	28	28	31	3	28	16	26		8	14	15	**11**	19	7	16	9	425
14	Sam Rameau **(R)**	31	15	11	8	22	18	8	23		13	9	20	28	18	32	15	14	419
15	J. B. Fortin **(R)**		21	21	12	20	16	21	19		29	24	25	21	7	20	17	16	371
16	Wade Cole	23	23	25	16	11	23	26	17	20	20	27	22	23	18	16	24	26	363
17	Timmy Catalano **(R)**	24	27	22	13	4	21	22	24		32	19	17	27	14	15	30	34	360
18	Jimmy Blewett	3	3	10	15	12	19	30	11	9	22	7	6						346
19	Calvin Carroll	21	32	19	19	16	22	25	28	14	36	30	16	24	24	11	28	30	323
20	Jon McKennedy	2*	16	17	Wth			17		4	**4**	2	4			2*			295
21	Chase Dowling		2	Wth	24*		17			18		12		9		26	9	8	289
22	Ken Heagy	16	19	23	29	7	24	20	27		Wth	Wth	21	Wth	27	25	20	37	278
23	Melissa Fifield	27	24	26	33	15	27	29	DNQ^{1}		26	31	30	26	29	31	31	29	261
24	Bobby Santos III									2	24	8	23	5		1	7	4	241
25	Kyle Bonsignore	17	4	14	21							21	11				29	15	220
26	Anthony Nocella	6	14	24	27		7	28			30					27	27	35	215
27	Kyle Ellwood				18	19	DNQ^{1}	24	16		16	22	31	Wth			34	23	208
28	Burt Myers	7	5*	6			Wth	4					Wth			19		Wth	181
29	Andrew Krause			27		17	10	18			18		7					**33**	180
30	Chuck Hossfeld													13	6	4	4	20	173
31	Dave Sapienza	15	18	20	30	5	INJ	INJ	INJ	INJ	INJ	INJ	INJ	INJ	23				153
32	Gary Putnam	30		Wth	14		20					28	Wth	16		9		39	152
33	Joey Mucciacciaro **(R)**				25	28		31			31	23	27	Wth		32	26	22	151
34	Walter Sutcliffe Jr.	32	20	Wth	22	Wth	DNQ^{1}	23	Wth		37	DNQ	29	22	Wth	33	Wth		148
35	Max Zachem				4		13	9			25	Wth	Wth					QL^{4}	125
36	Matt Hirschman	11					12							2					108
37	Andy Seuss	8								15	12					14			98
38	Tom Rogers Jr.								9						9*			18	98
39	Andrew Molleur **(R)**							Wth			33	DNQ^{1}	18				18	21	98
40	John Beatty Jr.								2						10			25	96
41	Tyler Rypkema **(R)**				23						23			20			33	27	94
42	George Brunnhoelzl III							15	15			16							86
43	Mike Rutkoski **(R)**								21			26	24		21				84
44	Mark Bakaj **(R)**				20							20					19	40	77
45	Kyle Soper														4			13	71
46	Kyle Ebersole	14	31											18					70
47	Jeff Rocco **(R)**				28		26				15								63
48	J. R. Bertuccio														8	DNS^{2}	Wth	28	62
49	Ryan Preece							14		13	19								55
50	Gary McDonald	Wth	Wth						Wth		Wth				30		23	24	55
51	Dave Salzarulo														26	28	25		53
52	Amy Catalano **(R)**											DNQ^{1}		17		30			52
53	Chris Young Jr. **(R)**								22						17				49
54	Joey Cipriano III **(R)**				32							29					22		49
55	Frank Fleming	10	30																48
56	Jamie Tomaino	29				24													35
57	Roger Turbush **(R)**								DNQ^{1}						25				33
58	Kyle Benjamin			12															32
59	Matt Galko **(R)**																12		32
60	Frank Vigliarolo Jr.								14										30
61	Kevin Shea **(R)**												28					31	29
62	Ryan Newman									7	17								28
63	Dylan Slepian **(R)**																	19	25
64	Anthony Sesely					21													23
65	James Civali		22																22
66	Mike Willis **(R)**															24			20
67	John Fortin								25						Wth				19
68	Danny Bohn					27													17
69	Bryan Dauzat									19	27								17
70	Jeremy Gerstner **(R)**	Wth	29																15
71	John Baker **(R)**								DNQ^{1}										13
72	Todd Cooper **(R)**										35	Wth							9
73	Jacob Perry **(R)**										38								6
74	Andy Jankowiak **(R)**															Wth		38	6
	John Montesanto **(R)**							Wth											
	Ronnie Williams																QL^{3}		
Pos.	Driver	MYR	SBO	THO	STA	WAL	SEE	THO	RIV	NHA‡	NHA	STA	THO	OSW	RIV	NHA	STA	THO	Points

Notes

- ^{‡} – Non-championship round.
- ^{1} – John Baker, Amy Catalano, Kyle Ellwood, Melissa Fifield, Andrew Molleur, Walter Sutcliffe Jr. and Roger Turbush received championship points, despite the fact that they did not qualify for the race.
- ^{2} – J. R. Bertuccio received championship points, despite the fact that he did not start the race.
- ^{3} – Ronnie Williams qualified in the No. 07 for Patrick Emerling.
- ^{4} – Max Zachem qualified in the No. 26 for Gary McDonald.

== See also ==
- 2019 Monster Energy NASCAR Cup Series
- 2019 NASCAR Xfinity Series
- 2019 NASCAR Gander Outdoors Truck Series
- 2019 ARCA Menards Series
- 2019 NASCAR K&N Pro Series East
- 2019 NASCAR K&N Pro Series West
- 2019 NASCAR Pinty's Series
- 2019 NASCAR PEAK Mexico Series
- 2019 NASCAR Whelen Euro Series
- 2019 CARS Tour
