= Chase Dowling =

American racing driver

- Nationality: American
- Born: January 15, 1998 (age 28) Roxbury, Connecticut, U.S.

NASCAR Whelen Modified Tour career
- Debut season: 2015
- Current team: Lawney Tinio
- Years active: 2015–2021, 2023–present
- Car number: 44
- Crew chief: Daniel Gamache
- Starts: 90
- Championships: 0
- Wins: 1
- Poles: 4
- Best finish: 2nd in 2018
- Finished last season: 18th (2026)
- Statistics up to date as of October 12, 2026.

Chase Dowling (born January 15, 1998) is an American professional stock car racing driver who competes part-time in the NASCAR Whelen Modified Tour, driving the No. 44 for Lawney Tinio.

Dowling has previously competed in series such as what is now known as the ARCA Menards Series East, the Modified Racing Series, the Tri-Track Open Modified Series, the EXIT Realty Modified Touring Series, and the Northeastern Midget Association.

== Motorsports results ==
=== NASCAR ===
(key) (Bold – Pole position awarded by qualifying time. Italics – Pole position earned by points standings or practice time. * – Most laps led.)

==== K&N Pro Series East ====
NASCAR K&N Pro Series East results
Year	Team	No.	Make	1	2	3	4	5	6	7	8	9	10	11	12	13	14	NKNPSEC	Pts	Ref
2016	Marsh Racing	31	Chevy	NSM	MOB	GRE	BRI	VIR	DOM	STA	COL	NHA	IOW	GLN	GRE	NJE	DOV; 9	48th	35	
2018	Marsh Racing	31	Chevy	NSM	BRI	LGY	SBO	SBO	MEM	NJM	TMP; 8	NHA	IOW	GLN	GTW	NHA	DOV	44th	36	

==== Whelen Modified Tour ====
NASCAR Whelen Modified Tour results
Year	Car owner	No.	Make	1	2	3	4	5	6	7	8	9	10	11	12	13	14	15	16	17	18	NWMTC	Pts	Ref
2015	Cheryl Tomaino	9	Chevy	TMP; 17	STA; 32	WFD; 16	STA; 12	TMP; 17	RIV; 13	NHA; 10	MND; 9	STA; 10	TMP; 11	BRI; 7	RIV; 3	NHA; 8	STA; 6	TMP; 9				9th	481	
2016	Robert Katon Jr.	9	Chevy	TMP; 11	STA; 8	**WFD**; 24	STA; 16	TMP; 25	RIV; 8	NHA; 11	MND; 16	STA; 4	TMP; 11	BRI; 13	RIV; 5	OSW; 8	SEE; 9	NHA; 11	STA; 5	TMP; 22		10th	543	
2017	Grady Jeffreys	15	Chevy	MYR	TMP; 25	STA; 3	LGY	TMP; 21	RIV			TMP; 14										17th	304	
2017	Rob Fuller	15	Chevy							NHA; 5	STA						NHA; 15	STA; 4	**TMP**; 2			17th	304	
2017	Eddie Harvey	11	Chevy										BRI; 4	SEE	OSW	RIV						17th	304	
2018	Rob Fuller	15	Chevy	MYR; 4	TMP; 8*	**STA**; 2	SEE; 2	TMP; 9	LGY; 6	RIV; 7	NHA; 2	**STA**; 25	TMP; 4	BRI; 2	OSW; 12	RIV; 3	**NHA**; 1	STA; 4*	TMP; 30			2nd	596	
2019	Cheryl Tomaino	99	Pontiac	MYR	SBO; 2		STA; 24	WAL	SEE; 17	TMP	RIV		STA; 12	TMP			NHA; 26					21st	289	
2019	Cheryl Tomaino	99	Chevy			TMP; Wth						NHA; 3						STA; Wth	TMP; Wth			21st	289	
2019	Danny Watts Racing	82	Chevy												OSW; 9	RIV		STA; 9	TMP; 8			21st	289	
2020	Danny Watts Racing	82	Chevy	JEN; 26	WMM; 10	WMM	JEN	MND	TMP													27th	122	
2020	Ben Dodge	9	Chevy							NHA; 15	STA; 5	TMP										27th	122	
2021	Philip Moran	10	Chevy	MAR	STA	RIV	JEN	OSW; 8	RIV	NHA	NRP	STA	BEE	OSW	RCH	RIV	STA					49th	36	
2023	Michele Davini	17	Chevy	NSM	RCH	MON	RIV	LEE	SEE	RIV	WAL	NHA; 11	LMP	THO	LGY	OSW	MON	RIV	NWS; 35	THO	MAR	59th	42	
2024	Lawney Tinio	44	Chevy	NSM	RCH	THO	MON	RIV	SEE	NHA; 3	MON	LMP	THO; 25	OSW	RIV	MON	THO; 6	NWS; 6	MAR			25th	136	
2025	Lawney Tinio	44	Chevy	NSM; 29	THO; 6	NWS	SEE; 8	RIV	WMM	LMP	MON	MON	THO; 16	RCH	OSW	NHA; 12	RIV	THO; 12	MAR			19th	181	
2026	Lawney Tinio	44	Chevy	NSM	MAR	THO; 9	SEE; 3	RIV	OXF	SEE; 2	CLM	WMM	MON	THO; 4	NHA; 7*	STA; 3	OSW	RIV	THO; 8			18th	275	
