= Andy Seuss =

American racing driver (born 1987)

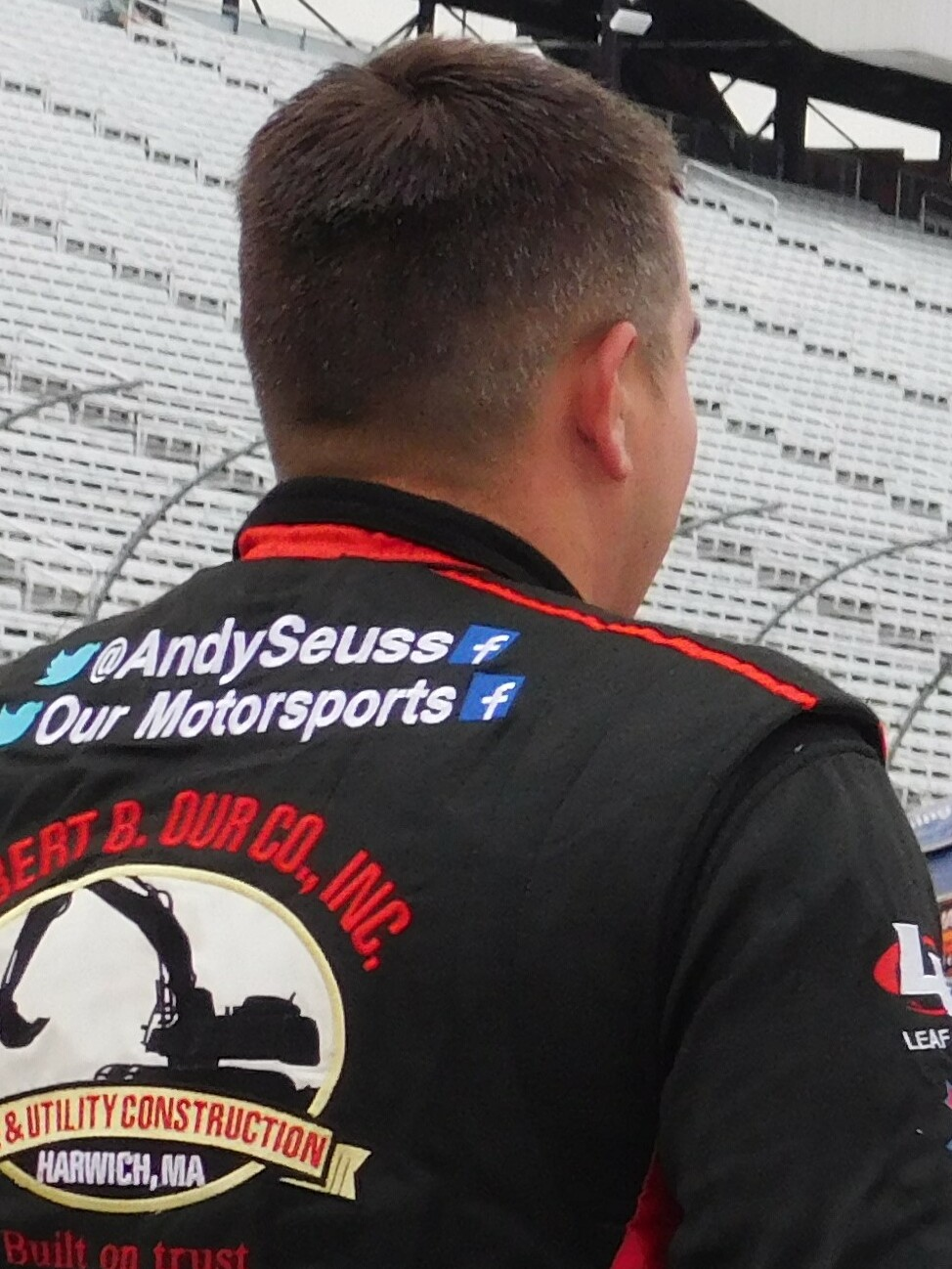
- Seuss at New Hampshire Motor Speedway in 2017
- Born: Andrew T. Seuss; March 15, 1987 (age 39) Hampstead, New Hampshire, U.S.

Whelen Modified Tour career
- Debut season: 2006
- Current team: Steve Seuss
- Car number: 70
- Engine: Chevrolet
- Crew chief: Steve Seuss
- Former teams: Steve Seuss, Brother-In-Law Racing, Eddie Harvey Racing, Danny Watts Racing
- Starts: 68
- Championships: 0
- Wins: 0
- Poles: 1
- Best finish: 26th in 2017
- Finished last season: 47th (2026)

Previous series
- 2015–2019 2006–2016: ARCA Racing Series; Whelen Southern Modified Tour

Championship titles
- 2014–2015: Whelen Southern Modified Tour

NASCAR Cup Series career
- 1 race run over 1 year
- 2019 position: 36th
- Best finish: 36th (2019)
- First race: 2019 Foxwoods Resort Casino 301 (Loudon)
Wins	Top tens	Poles
0	0	0

NASCAR FedEx Freight Truck Series career
- 1 race run over 1 year
- 2016 position: 78th
- Best finish: 78th (2016)
- First race: 2016 North Carolina Education Lottery 200 (Charlotte)
Wins	Top tens	Poles
0	0	0
- Statistics up to date as of August 22, 2026.

Andrew T. Seuss (born March 15, 1987) is an American professional stock car racing driver and team owner. As a driver, he won two consecutive championships in 2014 and 2015 in the NASCAR Whelen Southern Modified Tour, and also competed in the NASCAR Cup Series, NASCAR Truck Series, Whelen Modified Tour, ARCA Menards Series and what is now the ARCA Menards Series East. As an owner, he owns KLAS Motorsports, which fields the No. 71 car part-time in the ARCA Menards Series for Andy Jankowiak.

== Racing career ==
=== Early years ===
Seuss started in go-kart racing, running at Sugar Hill Speedway in Weare, New Hampshire. He later moved up to late model racing.

=== Whelen Southern Modified Tour ===
==== Early years ====
Seuss started competing in 2006, at the age of nineteen. He ran four races in that season, finishing half of them and recording the best finish of fourth in his final start of the season at Motor Mile Speedway. In 2007, Seuss ran four more races, leading 116 of 157 laps and recording his first win at Music City Motorplex. However, he recorded two last place finishes, one because of withdrawal and one because of shock problems.

==== Full-time ====
In 2008, Seuss went full-time, grabbing his first pole in the second race of the season. However, he crashed out of that race en route to the last place finish. He won the final race of the season to cap off his first season with longtime team owner David Riggs, and his first season with Advance Auto Parts as a sponsor. In 2009, Seuss stayed with Riggs, scoring wins from the pole at Myrtle Beach Speedway and Caraway Speedway, as well as non-pole wins at South Boston Speedway and Lanier Speedway. He finished second in the series' point standings. In 2010, Advance Auto Parts departed as a sponsor, but Seuss and Riggs picked up Q Racing Oil as a primary sponsor. Seuss scored two wins, both at Caraway Speedway, but a last-race crash sent him from second to fourth in the point standings. In 2011, Seuss did not return to Riggs' team, instead of running the first four races with Brian Fishel and the final ten races with Eddie Harvey. Those final ten races included three poles and four wins, and Seuss once again finished as the series' runner-up in the point standings. For 2012, Seuss stayed with Harvey's team, but was plagued by inconsistency, scoring only one win and finishing fifth in points. With no full-season sponsor in 2013, Seuss soldiered on, not scoring his first win until the ninth race but then winning that one and the two after it to rally to third in the point standings.

==== Championship seasons ====
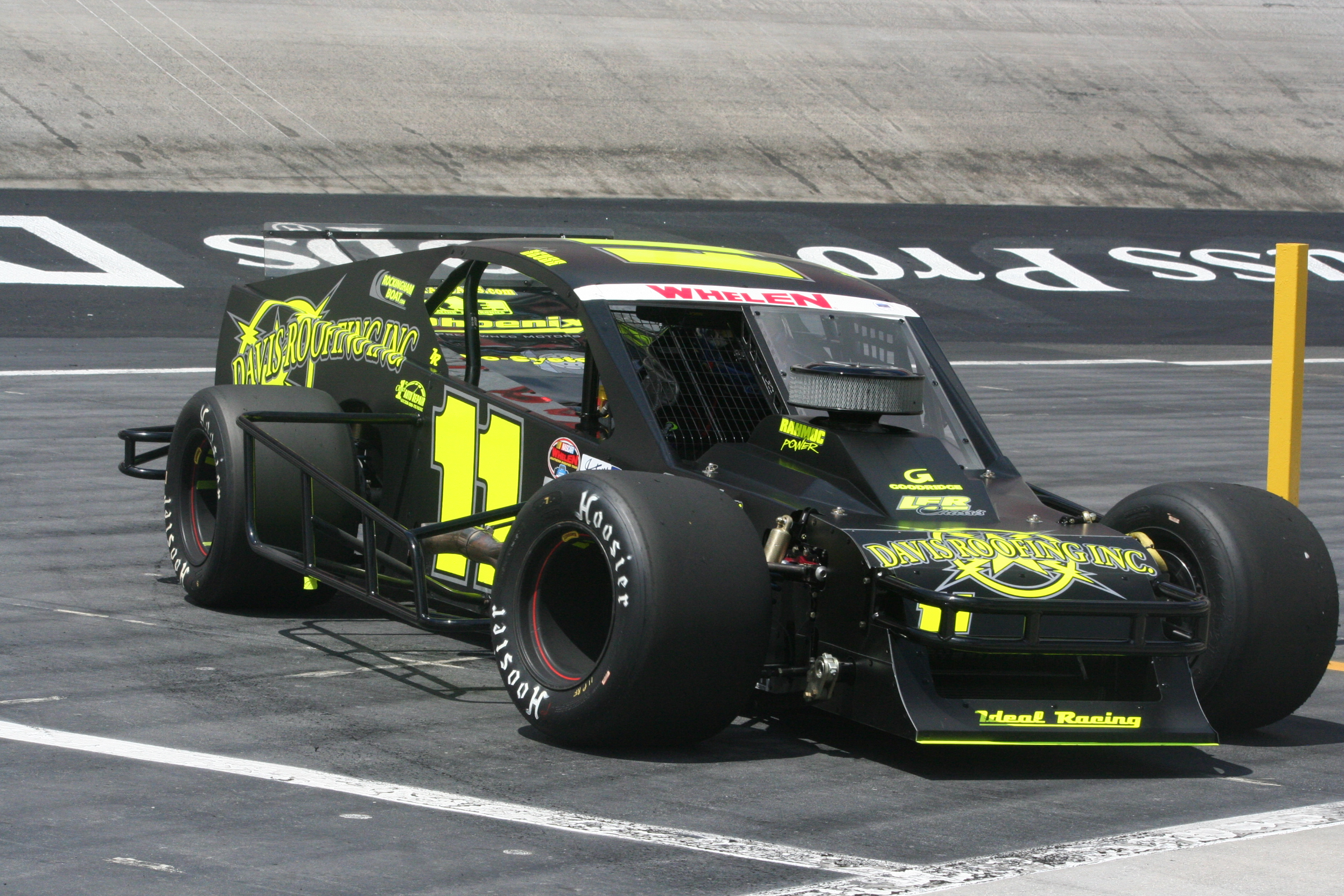
Seuss' Southern Modified Tour car at Bristol in 2015

Ideal Finance signed on to sponsor Seuss in 2014, and Seuss responded with a first-race win, and not holding the top spot in the standings for only one race. He won his first championship that season on the back of a season in which he never finished a race outside of the top ten. In 2015, Seuss started with an opening-race crash, but rebounded by winning the race after that. He moved into the lead in the point standings after a win in the penultimate race at South Boston. A sixth-place finish in the final race of the season secured another championship for Seuss.

==== After the championships ====
Coming off back-to-back championships was no easy task, as new sponsors signed on for the beginning of the season. Seuss led over forty laps in that opening race but finished fifth. The 2016 season included a pole and a win, as well as finishing in the top ten in every race and completing every lap of the season save for one at South Boston. However, a third consecutive title was not in the cards, as Seuss finished the season third in points, losing by about twenty to winner Burt Myers.

=== Whelen Modified Tour ===
Seuss has been a part-time competitor in the series since 2006, never running more than six races a season. His first top five in the series came at New Hampshire Motor Speedway in 2013 driving for Eddie Harvey. In 2017, when the Southern Modified Tour disbanded, Seuss ran a partial schedule with Harvey and others while also running some ARCA Racing Series events.

=== ARCA Menards Series ===
Seuss debuted in the ARCA Racing Series in 2015, driving the No. 76 for Bryan Dauzat at Talladega Superspeedway. Seuss finished 21st, two laps down. His second start came five races later, driving the No. 40 for Roger Carter, and he finished two positions higher than in his debut, recording a nineteenth at Chicagoland Speedway. In 2016, Seuss returned to Talladega, this time driving for Chris Our. However, brake issues hampered his efforts and he finished 31st. Seuss continued his superspeedway efforts with Our in 2017, running Daytona and Talladega, finishing second at Talladega just behind Justin Haley. The car Seuss ran at Daytona was originally from Diamond Ridge Motorsports and the 1997 NASCAR Busch Series.

Seuss returned to ARCA in 2023, this time as a team owner. He and Kevin Lapierre purchased driver Andy Jankowiak's team, Jankowiak Motorsports, on January 19, 2023, allowing Jankowiak to focus on the driver role. The team was renamed KLAS Motorsports (the initials of the two new owners). KLAS would win its first race in the 2026 Alabama Manufactured Housing 200 at Talladega Superspeedway with Jankowiak as the driver.

==== K&N Pro Series East ====
Seuss made his debut K&N Pro Series East at New Hampshire Motor Speedway in 2017 behind the wheel of No. 31 Chevrolet SS for Marsh Racing. He started fifteenth and finished thirteenth.

=== Truck Series ===
In 2013, Seuss attempted to make his Camping World Truck Series debut at Rockingham Speedway for FDNY Racing, but failed to qualify. Two years later, he failed to qualify at Talladega Superspeedway. Seuss broke through in 2016, failing to qualify at Charlotte Motor Speedway with FDNY Racing's No. 28, but then got into the race when MAKE Motorsports sold the ride in their No. 1 entry to Seuss and FDNY Racing. Seuss completed only twenty laps until a crash sent him home in last place.

=== Cup Series ===
On June 28, 2019, it was announced that Seuss would make his Monster Energy NASCAR Cup Series debut at New Hampshire Motor Speedway in July, driving the team's No. 51 entry.

=== Xfinity Series ===
In October 2019, Seuss and Our Motorsports partnered to run the full 2020 NASCAR Xfinity Series schedule in the No. 02, with Seuss also working as the team's director of operations. However, after sixteen races with Brett Moffitt primarily driving the car, Seuss left the team on July 22, 2020.

== Personal life ==
Seuss attended Pinkerton Academy and New Hampshire Technical Institute. In 2014, after finishing fifth in the season finale at Charlotte Motor Speedway to clinch the Southern Modified Tour championship, Seuss proposed to his girlfriend Jen. The two married in June 2015. Their first son Lyle was born in fall 2016. Seuss owns a boat repair business in Lake Norman when he is not racing.

== Motorsports career results ==
=== NASCAR ===
(key) (Bold – Pole position awarded by qualifying time. Italics – Pole position earned by points standings or practice time. * – Most laps led. ** – All laps led.)

==== Monster Energy Cup Series ====
Monster Energy NASCAR Cup Series results
Year	Team	No.	Make	1	2	3	4	5	6	7	8	9	10	11	12	13	14	15	16	17	18	19	20	21	22	23	24	25	26	27	28	29	30	31	32	33	34	35	36	MENCC	Pts	Ref
2019	Rick Ware Racing	51	Ford	DAY	ATL	LVS	PHO	CAL	MAR	TEX	BRI	RCH	TAL	DOV	KAN	CLT	POC	MCH	SON	CHI	DAY	KEN	NHA; 28	POC	GLN	MCH	BRI	DAR	IND	LVS	RCH	CLT	DOV	TAL	KAN	MAR	TEX	PHO	HOM	36th	9	

==== Camping World Truck Series ====
NASCAR Camping World Truck Series results
Year	Team	No.	Make	1	2	3	4	5	6	7	8	9	10	11	12	13	14	15	16	17	18	19	20	21	22	23	NCWTC	Pts	Ref
2013	FDNY Racing	28	Chevy	DAY	MAR	CAR; DNQ	KAN	CLT	DOV	TEX	KEN	IOW	ELD	POC	MCH	BRI	MSP	IOW	CHI	LVS	TAL	MAR	TEX	PHO	HOM		NA	-	
2015	FDNY Racing	28	Chevy	DAY	ATL	MAR	KAN	CLT	DOV	TEX	GTW	IOW	KEN	ELD	POC	MCH	BRI	MSP	CHI	NHA	LVS	TAL; DNQ	MAR	TEX	PHO	HOM	NA	-	
2016	FDNY Racing	1	Chevy	DAY	ATL	MAR	KAN	DOV	CLT; 32	TEX	IOW	GTW	KEN	ELD	POC	BRI	MCH	MSP	CHI	NHA	LVS	TAL	MAR	TEX	PHO	HOM	78th	1	

==== K&N Pro Series East ====
NASCAR K&N Pro Series East results
Year	Team	No.	Make	1	2	3	4	5	6	7	8	9	10	11	12	13	14	NKNPSEC	Pts	Ref
2017	Marsh Racing	31	Chevy	NSM	GRE	BRI	SBO	SBO	MEM	BLN	TMP	NHA; 13	IOW	GLN	LGY	NJM	DOV	57th	31	

==== Whelen Modified Tour ====
NASCAR Whelen Modified Tour results
Year	Car owner	No.	Make	1	2	3	4	5	6	7	8	9	10	11	12	13	14	15	16	17	18	NWMTC	Pts	Ref
2006	Steve Seuss	70	Chevy	TMP	STA	JEN	TMP	STA	NHA; DNQ	HOL	RIV	STA	TMP	MAR	TMP	NHA; 39	WFD	TMP	STA			64th	80	
2007	Steve Seuss	70	Chevy	TMP	STA	WTO	STA	TMP	NHA; 19	TSA	RIV	STA	TMP; 9	MAN; 24	MAR	NHA; 8	TMP	STA	TMP			42nd	477	
2008	Steve Seuss	70	Chevy	TMP	STA	STA	TMP; 33	NHA; 18	SPE	RIV	STA	TMP; 21	MAN; 14	TMP	NHA	MAR	CHE	STA	TMP; 21			40th	494	
2009	Steve Seuss	70	Chevy	TMP; 17	STA; DNQ	STA; 16	NHA; 21	SPE	RIV	STA; 21	BRI	TMP; 15	NHA	MAR	STA	TMP						32nd	606	
2010	Steve Seuss	70	Chevy	TMP; 36	STA; 26	STA; 10	MAR; 20	NHA; 23	LIM	MON	RIV	STA	TMP	BRI	NHA; 34	STA	TMP					36th	532	
2011	Steve Seuss	70	Chevy	TMP	STA	STA	MND; 17	TMP	NHA; 19	RIV	STA	NHA; 20	BRI	DEL	TMP	LRP	NHA	STA	TMP			35th	321	
2012	Steve Seuss	70	Chevy	TMP	STA	MND; 14	STA	WFD	NHA; 7	STA	TMP	BRI	TMP	RIV	NHA; 24	STA						29th	99	
2012	John Lukosavage	11	Chevy														TMP; 32					29th	99	
2013	Eddie Harvey Racing	11	Chevy	TMP	STA	STA	WFD	RIV	NHA; 4													32nd	77	
2013	Steve Seuss	70	Chevy							MND; 7	STA	TMP	BRI	RIV	NHA	STA	TMP					32nd	77	
2014	Steve Seuss	70	Chevy	TMP	STA	STA	WFD	RIV	NHA; 8	MND; 17	STA	TMP	BRI	NHA	STA	TMP						32nd	63	
2015	Steve Seuss	70	Chevy	TMP	STA	WFD	STA	TMP	RIV	NHA; 27						NHA; 15	STA	TMP				36th	113	
2015	Robert Katon Jr.	13	Chevy								MND; 8	STA	TMP; 13	BRI	RIV							36th	113	
2016	Steve Seuss	70	Chevy	TMP	STA	WFD	STA	TMP	RIV	NHA; 16	MND	STA	TMP	BRI	RIV	OSW	SEE	NHA	STA	TMP		46th	28	
2017	Eddie Harvey Racing	11	Chevy	MYR; 3	TMP; 17	STA	LGY; 22	TMP; 28	RIV													26th	213	
2017	Steve Seuss	70	Chevy							NHA; 6	STA	TMP	BRI; 6	SEE	OSW	RIV	NHA; 25	STA				26th	213	
2017	Brady Bunch Racing	00	Chevy																TMP; 33			26th	213	
2018	Brother-In-Law Racing	97	Chevy	MYR; 13																		35th	138	
2018	Brother-In-Law Racing	57	Chevy		TMP; 26	STA	SEE	TMP	LGY	RIV	NHA; 27	STA	TMP	BRI; 13	OSW	RIV	NHA; 4	STA	TMP			35th	138	
2019	Brother-In-Law Racing	97	Chevy	MYR; 8	SBO	TMP	STA	WAL	SEE	TMP	RIV											37th	98	
2019	Steve Seuss	70	Chevy									NHA; 12	STA	TMP	OSW	RIV						37th	98	
2019	Danny Watts Racing	82	Chevy														NHA; 14	STA	TMP			37th	98	
2020	Steve Seuss	70	Chevy	JEN	WMM	WMM	JEN	MND	TMP	**NHA**; 6	STA	TMP										40th	39	
2021	Steve Seuss	70	Chevy	MAR; 17	STA	RIV	JEN	OSW	RIV	NHA; 6	NRP	STA	BEE	OSW	RCH	RIV	STA					39th	65	
2022	Steve Seuss	70	Chevy	NSM	RCH	RIV	LEE	JEN	MND	RIV	WAL	NHA; 22	CLM	TMP	LGY	OSW	RIV	TMP	MAR			64th	22	
2023	Steve Seuss	70	Chevy	NSM	RCH	MON	RIV	LEE	SEE	RIV	WAL	NHA; 9	LMP	THO	LGY	OSW	MON	RIV	NWS; 22	THO	MAR; 27	43rd	74	
2024	Steve Seuss	70	Chevy	NSM	RCH; 25	THO	MON	RIV	SEE	NHA; 21	MON	LMP	THO	OSW	RIV	MON	THO	NWS; Wth	MAR; 14			46th	72	
2025	Steve Seuss	70	Chevy	NSM	THO	NWS	SEE	RIV	WMM	LMP	MON	MON	THO	RCH; 18	OSW	NHA; 4	RIV	THO	MAR; 13			36th	97	
2026	Steve Seuss	70	Chevy	NSM	MAR; 26	THO	SEE	RIV	OXF	SEE	CLM	WMM	MON	THO	NHA; 29	STA	OSW	RIV	THO			47th	33	

==== Whelen Southern Modified Tour ====
NASCAR Whelen Southern Modified Tour results
Year	Car owner	No.	Make	1	2	3	4	5	6	7	8	9	10	11	12	13	14	NSWMTC	Pts	Ref
2006	Steve Seuss	70	Chevy	CRW; 22	GRE	CRW	DUB; 14	CRW	BGS	MAR	CRW	ACE	CRW; 19	HCY	DUB; 4	SNM		26th	484	
2007	Steve Seuss	70	Chevy	CRW	FAI; 1*	GRE; 4	CRW; 19	CRW; 19	BGS	MAR	ACE	CRW	SNM	CRW	CRW			22nd	552	
2008	David Riggs	47	Dodge	CRW; 10	ACE; 21	CRW; 2*	BGS; 5	**CRW**; 18	LAN; 9	CRW; 3	SNM; 4	MAR; 7	CRW; 4	CRW; 1*				4th	1617	
2009	David Riggs	47	Dodge	CON; 20	SBO; 1*	CRW; 2	LAN; 1*	**CRW**; 3	BGS; 14	BRI; 3	CRW; 3	MBS; 1	CRW; 14	CRW; 1*	MAR; 5	ACE; 2	CRW; 6	2nd	2205	
2010	David Riggs	47	Dodge	ATL; 12	CRW; 1**	SBO; 3	CRW; 6	BGS; 5	BRI; 6	**CRW**; 1**	LGY; 5	TRI; 3	**CLT**; 18					4th	1566	
2011	Bryan Fishel	44	Chevy	CRW; 8	HCY; 6	SBO; 15	CRW; 13											2nd	2231	
2011	Eddie Harvey Racing	11	Chevy					CRW; 3	BGS; 8	BRI; 2		LGY; 1	**THO**; 4	TRI; 2	CRW; 1**	CLT; 4	**CRW**; 4	2nd	2231	
2011	Eddie Harvey Racing	11	Dodge								**CRW**; 1*							2nd	2231	
2012	Eddie Harvey Racing	11	Chevy	CRW; 17	CRW; 10	SBO; 2	CRW; 22	CRW; 18	BGS; 5	BRI; 10	LGY; 3	THO; 1*	CRW; 8	CLT; 5				5th	388	
2013	Eddie Harvey Racing	11	Dodge	CRW; 5		SBO; 12												4th	464	
2013	Eddie Harvey Racing	11	Chevy		SNM; 5		CRW; 8	CRW; 3	BGS; 10	BRI; 9	**LGY**; 14*	**CRW**; 1*	CRW; 1*	SNM; 1**	CLT; 12			4th	464	
2014	Eddie Harvey Racing	11	Chevy	**CRW**; 1**	SNM; 4	SBO; 1*	LGY; 2	**CRW**; 1**	BGS; 4	BRI; 9	LGY; 3	CRW; 2	SBO; 2	SNM; 8	CRW; 5	CRW; 4	CLT; 5	1st	583	
2015	Eddie Harvey Racing	11	Chevy	CRW; 19	CRW; 1	SBO; 16	LGY; 4	**CRW**; 7*	BGS; 6	BRI; 1	LGY; 3	SBO; 1*	CLT; 6					1st	392	
2016	Eddie Harvey Racing	11	Chevy	CRW; 5	CON; 4	SBO; 3	CRW; 4	CRW; 1	BGS; 3	BRI; 2	ECA; 7	SBO; 10	**CRW**; 4	CLT; 7				3rd	442	

=== ARCA Menards Series ===
(key) (Bold – Pole position awarded by qualifying time. Italics – Pole position earned by points standings or practice time. * – Most laps led.)

ARCA Menards Series results
Year	Team	No.	Make	1	2	3	4	5	6	7	8	9	10	11	12	13	14	15	16	17	18	19	20	AMSC	Pts	Ref
2015	Brother-In-Law Racing	76	Chevy	DAY; DNQ	MOB	NSH	SLM	TAL; 21	TOL	NJE	POC	MCH												81st	285	
2015	Carter 2 Motorsports	40	Dodge										CHI; 19	WIN	IOW	IRP	POC	BLN	ISF	DSF	SLM	KEN	KAN	81st	285	
2016	Our Motorsports	02	Chevy	DAY	NSH	SLM	TAL; 31	TOL	NJE	POC	MCH	MAD	WIN	IOW	IRP	POC	BLN	ISF	DSF	SLM	CHI	KEN	KAN	130th	75	
2017	Our Motorsports	02	Chevy	DAY; 20	NSH	SLM	TAL; 2	TOL	ELK	POC	MCH	MAD	IOW	IRP	POC	WIN	ISF	ROA	DSF	SLM	CHI; 24	KEN	KAN	44th	460	
2018	Our Motorsports	02	Chevy	DAY; 19	NSH	SLM	TAL; 10	TOL	CLT; 16	POC	MCH	MAD	GTW	CHI	IOW	ELK	POC	ISF	BLN	DSF	SLM	IRP	KAN	44th	465	
2019	Our Motorsports	02	Chevy	DAY; 9	FIF	SLM	TAL; 8	NSH	TOL															30th	550	
2019	Our Motorsports	02	Ford							CLT; 11	POC	MCH	MAD	GTW	CHI	ELK	IOW	POC	ISF	DSF	SLM	IRP	KAN	30th	550	
2020	Our Motorsports	02	Chevy	DAY; 28	PHO	TAL	POC	IRP	KEN	IOW	KAN	TOL	TOL	MCH	DAY	GTW	L44	TOL	BRI	WIN	MEM	ISF	KAN	88th	16	

=== SMART Modified Tour ===
SMART Modified Tour results
Year	Car owner	No.	Make	1	2	3	4	5	6	7	8	9	10	11	12	SMTC	Pts	Ref
2021	Steve Seuss	70	N/A	CRW	FLO	SBO	FCS	CRW	DIL	CAR	CRW	DOM	PUL	HCY; 3	ACE	32nd	28	

^{*} Season still in progress
^{1} Ineligible for series points
