= Matt Swanson =

American racing driver (born 2000)

- Nationality: American
- Born: February 16, 2000 (age 26) Acton, Massachusetts, U.S.

NASCAR Whelen Modified Tour career
- Debut season: 2015
- Current team: Matt Swanson
- Years active: 2015–2021, 2023–present
- Car number: 89
- Starts: 96
- Championships: 0
- Wins: 0
- Poles: 1
- Best finish: 5th in 2019
- Finished last season: 22nd (2026)
- Statistics up to date as of October 12, 2026.

Matthew Swanson (born February 16, 2000) is an American professional stock car racing driver who competes part-time in the NASCAR Whelen Modified Tour, driving the No. 89 for his own team. He is the son of former NASCAR Busch North Series driver John Swanson.

Swanson has previously competed in series such as the Race of Champions Late Model Series, the PASS North Super Late Model Series, the Modified Racing Series (where he was the 2020 & 2024 series champion), the Tri-Track Open Modified Series, and the Indoor Auto Racing Championship.

== Motorsports results ==
=== NASCAR ===
(key) (Bold – Pole position awarded by qualifying time. Italics – Pole position earned by points standings or practice time. * – Most laps led.)

==== Whelen Modified Tour ====
NASCAR Whelen Modified Tour results
Year	Car owner	No.	Make	1	2	3	4	5	6	7	8	9	10	11	12	13	14	15	16	17	18	NWMTC	Pts	Ref
2015	John Swanson	89	Chevy	TMP	STA	WAT	STA	TMP	RIV	NHA	MON	STA; 15	TMP; 15	BRI	RIV	NHA; 24	STA; 7	TMP; 27				31st	132	
2016	John Swanson	89	Chevy	TMP; 15	STA; 11	**WFD**; 7	STA; 17	TMP; 3	RIV; 9	NHA; 13	MND; 12	STA; 21	TMP; 16	BRI; 10	RIV; 18	OSW; 21	SEE; 12	NHA; 4	STA; 8	TMP; 9		9th	543	
2017	John Swanson	89	Ford	MYR; 11	THO; 7	STA; 14	LGY; 10	THO; 12	RIV; 13	NHA; 28	STA; 10	THO; 17	BRI; 10	SEE; 4	OSW; 12	RIV; 19	NHA; 12	STA; 27	THO; 14			8th	484	
2018	John Swanson	89	Ford	MYR	TMP; 5	STA; 7	SEE; 30	TMP; 10	LGY	RIV	NHA; 8	STA	TMP; Wth									21st	341	
2018	Boehler Racing Enterprises	3	Chevy										TMP; 2	BRI	OSW; 6	RIV; 23	NHA; 30	STA; 29	TMP; 7			21st	341	
2019	Boehler Racing Enterprises	3	Chevy	MYR; 18	SBO; 11	TMP; 7	STA; 34	WAL; 14	SEE; 8	TMP; 7	RIV; 18	NHA; 5	STA; 4	TMP; 9	OSW; 25	RIV; 11	NHA; 6	STA; 5	TMP; 3			5th	522	
2020	Boehler Racing Enterprises	3	Chevy	JEN; 9	WMM; 28	WMM; 3	JEN; 7	MND; 13	TMP; 9	NHA; 7	STA; 9	TMP; 11										6th	301	
2021	Boehler Racing Enterprises	3	Chevy	MAR	**STA**; 20*	RIV	JEN	OSW	RIV	NHA; 31	NRP	STA; 13	BEE; 4	OSW	RCH	RIV	STA; 17					26th	137	
2023	John Swanson	89	Chevy	NSM	RCH	MON	RIV	LEE	SEE	RIV	WAL	NHA; 8	LMP	THO; 23	LGY	OSW	MON	RIV	NWS	THO; 11	MAR	39th	90	
2024	John Swanson	89	Chevy	NSM	RCH	THO; 10	MON	RIV	SEE; 10	NHA; 16	MON	LMP	THO; 6	OSW	RIV	MON	THO; 11	NWS	MAR			22nd	167	
2025	Roscoe Racing	25	Chevy	NSM	THO; 10	NWS	SEE	RIV	WMM	LMP	MON	MON	THO; 6	RCH	OSW	NHA	RIV	THO; 2	MAR			33rd	114	
2026	Matt Swanson	89	N/A	NSM	MAR	THO; 15	SEE; 13	RIV	OXF	SEE; 12	CLM	WMM	MON	THO; 5	NHA	STA; 17	OSW	RIV	THO; 5			22nd	197	
