= Rob Summers =

American racing driver

- Nationality: American
- Born: February 19, 1972 (age 54) Manchester, Connecticut, U.S.

NASCAR Whelen Modified Tour career
- Debut season: 1998
- Years active: 1998–2010, 2013, 2016–2021
- Starts: 207
- Championships: 0
- Wins: 0
- Poles: 9
- Best finish: 6th in 2018
- Statistics up to date as of August 6, 2024.

Rob Summers (born February 19, 1972) is an American professional stock car racing driver who competed in the NASCAR Whelen Modified Tour from 1997 to 2021. Summers is the owner of Hoosier Tire East, the main racing tire distributor for New England. In 2005, he won the SK Modified track championship at the Waterford Speedbowl.

Summers has also competed in series such as the Tri-Track Open Modified Series, the Modified Racing Series, the USAC Silver Crown Series, and the World Series of Asphalt Stock Car Racing.

== Motorsports results ==
=== NASCAR ===
(key) (Bold – Pole position awarded by qualifying time. Italics – Pole position earned by points standings or practice time. * – Most laps led.)

==== Whelen Modified Tour ====
NASCAR Whelen Modified Tour results
Year	Car owner	No.	Make	1	2	3	4	5	6	7	8	9	10	11	12	13	14	15	16	17	18	19	20	21	22	NWMTC	Pts	Ref
1998	Bear Motorsports	14	Chevy	RPS	TMP	MAR	STA	NZH	STA	GLN	JEN	RIV	NHA	NHA	LEE	HOL	TMP	NHA	RIV	STA; 22	NHA	TMP	STA			N/A	0	
1998	N/A	55	Chevy																					TMP; 27	FLE	N/A	0	
1999	N/A	14	Dodge	TMP; DNQ	RPS; DNQ	STA; DNQ	RCH	STA; 12	RIV; 24	JEN													**MAR**; 11	TMP; DNQ		28th	1126	
1999	N/A	55	Dodge								NHA; DNQ	NZH	HOL	TMP; 17												28th	1126	
1999	N/A	55	Chevy												NHA; 38	RIV	GLN; DNQ	STA; 6		TMP; 23	NHA; 23	STA; 32				28th	1126	
1999	N/A	42	Dodge																RPS; 23							28th	1126	
2000	Gaydosh Family	55	Chevy	**STA**; 23	**RCH**; 35	**STA**; 22	RIV; DNQ	SEE; 27	NHA; 31	NZH; 24	TMP; 20	RIV; 16	GLN; 34	TMP; DNQ	STA; 5	WFD; 3*	NHA; 19	**STA**; 12	MAR; 13	TMP; 14						18th	1610	
2001	Robert Garbarino	4	Dodge	SBO; 28	TMP; 17	STA; 7	**WFD**; 4	NZH; 21	STA; 29	RIV; 15	SEE; 18	RCH; 38	NHA; 3	HOL; 7	RIV; 10	CHE; 4	TMP; 7	STA; 25	WFD; 6	TMP; 14	STA; 18	MAR; 11	TMP; 27			12th	2380	
2002	Bear Motorsports	14	Pontiac	TMP; 2	STA; 17	WFD; 4	NZH; 4	RIV; 20	SEE; 5	RCH; 36	STA; 20	BEE; 7														13th	2222	
2002	N/A	30	Chevy										NHA; 21	RIV; 6												13th	2222	
2002	Bear Motorsports	14	Chevy												TMP; 30											13th	2222	
2002	N/A	10	Chevy													STA; 20	WFD; 13	TMP; 24	NHA; 33	STA; 14	MAR; 6	TMP; 27				13th	2222	
2003	N/A	11	Dodge	TMP; 17	STA; 24	WFD; 5	NZH; 26	STA; 11	LER; 28	BLL; 19	BEE; 30	NHA			TMP; DNQ	STA	WFD	TMP; DNQ	NHA; 39	STA; DNQ	TMP					28th	1291	
2003	N/A	11	Chevy										ADI; 12													28th	1291	
2003	N/A	34	N/A											RIV; DNQ												28th	1291	
2004	N/A	16	Chevy	TMP	STA; DNQ		NZH; 9	STA; 12	RIV	LER; 6	WAL; DNQ	BEE; 7		SEE; 28	RIV	STA	TMP	WFD	TMP							32nd	1040	
2004	N/A	14	Dodge			WFD; 10																				32nd	1040	
2004	N/A	11	Chevy										NHA; 19							NHA; 35	STA	TMP; DNQ				32nd	1040	
2005	N/A	11	Chevy	TMP	STA	RIV	WFD	STA	JEN	NHA; 19	BEE	SEE	RIV	STA	TMP											61st	194	
2005	N/A	16	Chevy													WFD; 25	MAR	TMP								61st	194	
2005	N/A	60	Ford																NHA; 35	STA	TMP					61st	194	
2006	Guy Ronzoni	1	Pontiac	TMP; 24	STA; 5	JEN; 21	TMP; 35	STA; 19	NHA; 30	HOL; 13	RIV; 5	STA; 26	TMP; 25			NHA; 32	WFD; 26	TMP; 11	STA; 28							22nd	1475	
2006	Guy Ronzoni	01	Pontiac											MAR; 28	TMP											22nd	1475	
2007	Guy Ronzoni	1	Pontiac	TMP; 24	STA; 31	WTO; 17	STA; DNQ	TMP	NHA; 31	TSA	RIV	STA					TMP; 31	STA	TMP							40th	544	
2007	Guy Ronzoni	1	Chevy										TMP; 32	MAN	MAR	NHA										40th	544	
2008	Bill Frasco	1	Chevy	TMP	STA; 33	STA; 29	TMP	NHA; 15	SPE	RIV	STA; 31	TMP	MAN	TMP	NHA; 4	MAR	CHE	STA; 12	TMP; 27							34th	697	
2009	Bill Frasco	1	Chevy	TMP; 34	STA; 29	STA; 17	NHA; 12	SPE	RIV	STA	BRI	TMP; 27	NHA; 15	MAR	STA; 27	TMP; 11										29th	788	
2010	Bill Frasco	1	Chevy	TMP; 28	STA; 32	STA; 5	MAR	NHA; 31	LIM	MND	RIV	STA	TMP		NHA; 33	STA; 27	TMP; 32									32nd	690	
2010	Bill Frasco	71	Chevy											BRI; 19												32nd	690	
2013	Kelly Iverson	5	Chevy	TMP	STA	STA	WFD; 27	RIV	NHA	MND	STA	TMP	BRI	RIV	NHA	STA	TMP									45th	17	
2016	Mike Murphy	64	Chevy	TMP; 18	STA; 12	WFD; 5	STA; 24	TMP; 22	RIV; 20	NHA; 19	MND; 9	STA; 14	TMP; 17	BRI; 20	RIV; 26	OSW; 4	SEE; 17	NHA; 15	STA; Wth	TMP; 21						15th	441	
2017	Mike Murphy	64	Chevy	**MYR**; 2*	TMP; 27	STA; 13	LGY; 6	TMP; 15	RIV; 16	NHA; 21	STA; 6	TMP; 18	BRI; 25	SEE; 11	OSW; 11	RIV; 10	NHA; 21	STA; 19	TMP; 12							9th	474	
2018	Mike Murphy	64	Chevy	MYR; 10	TMP; 7	STA; 11	SEE; 11	TMP; 8	LGY; 13	RIV; 22	NHA; 12	STA; 13	TMP; 16	BRI; 3	OSW; 18	RIV; 10	NHA; 11	STA; 6	TMP; 18							6th	515	
2019	Mike Murphy	64	Chevy	MYR; 22	SBO; 28	TMP; 28	STA; 31	WAL; 3	SEE; 28	TMP; 16	RIV; 26	NHA; 8	STA; 14	TMP; 15	**OSW**; 11	RIV; 19	NHA; 7	STA; 16	TMP; 9							13th	425	
2020	Mike Murphy	64	Chevy	JEN; 10	WMM; 26	WMM; 14	JEN; 17	MND; 22	TMP; 15	NHA; 26	STA; 24	TMP; 14														17th	228	
2021	Mike Murphy	64	Toyota	MAR; 19																						46th	47	
2021	Mike Murphy	64	Chevy		STA; 22	RIV	JEN	OSW	RIV	NHA	NRP	STA	BEE	OSW	RCH	RIV	STA									46th	47	
