= Tyler Barry =

American racing driver

- Born: December 17, 2005 (age 20) Griswold, Connecticut, U.S.

NASCAR Whelen Modified Tour career
- Debut season: 2024
- Years active: 2024–2025
- Starts: 12
- Championships: 0
- Wins: 0
- Poles: 0
- Best finish: 15th in 2025
- Finished last season: 15th (2025)
- Statistics up to date as of October 24, 2025.

Tyler Barry (born December 17, 2005) is an American professional stock car racing driver who last competed part-time in the NASCAR Whelen Modified Tour, driving the No. 59 for Jody Lauzon. He is the son of former driver Ken Barry, who has also competed in the Modified Tour. His grandfather was the legendary Art Barry, who founded Spearpoint Automotive and SPAFCO Race Chassis, who fielded the No. 21 car that was piloted to many victories and championships across New England.

Barry has previously competed in series such as the SMART Modified Tour, the Modified Racing Series, the Tri-Track Open Modified Series, and the NELCAR Legends Tour. He was the 2022 SK Lite Modified Champion at Stafford Motor Speedway.

== Motorsports results ==
=== NASCAR ===
(key) (Bold – Pole position awarded by qualifying time. Italics – Pole position earned by points standings or practice time. * – Most laps led.)

==== Whelen Modified Tour ====
NASCAR Whelen Modified Tour results
Year	Team	No.	Make	1	2	3	4	5	6	7	8	9	10	11	12	13	14	15	16	NWMTC	Pts	Ref
2024	Jody Lauzon	00	Chevy	NSM	RCH	THO	MON	RIV	SEE	NHA	MON	LMP	THO	OSW	RIV	MON	THO; 20	NWS	MAR	62nd	24	
2025	Jody Lauzon	59	Chevy	NSM; 22	THO; 16	NWS; 18	SEE; 7	RIV; 19	WMM; 15	LMP; 17	MON; 20	MON; 16	THO; 20	RCH; 20	OSW	NHA	RIV	THO	MAR	15th	294	

=== SMART Modified Tour ===
SMART Modified Tour results
Year	Car owner	No.	Make	1	2	3	4	5	6	7	8	9	10	11	12	13	14	SMTC	Pts	Ref
2023	N/A	8NY	N/A	FLO	CRW	SBO	HCY	FCS	CRW	ACE	CAR	PUL	TRI	SBO; 13	ROU			46th	28	
2024	N/A	8NY	N/A	FLO	CRW	SBO; 11	TRI	ROU	HCY	FCS	CRW	JAC	CAR	CRW	DOM	SBO	NWS	48th	30	
