= Ronnie Williams (racing driver) =

American racing driver (born 1996)

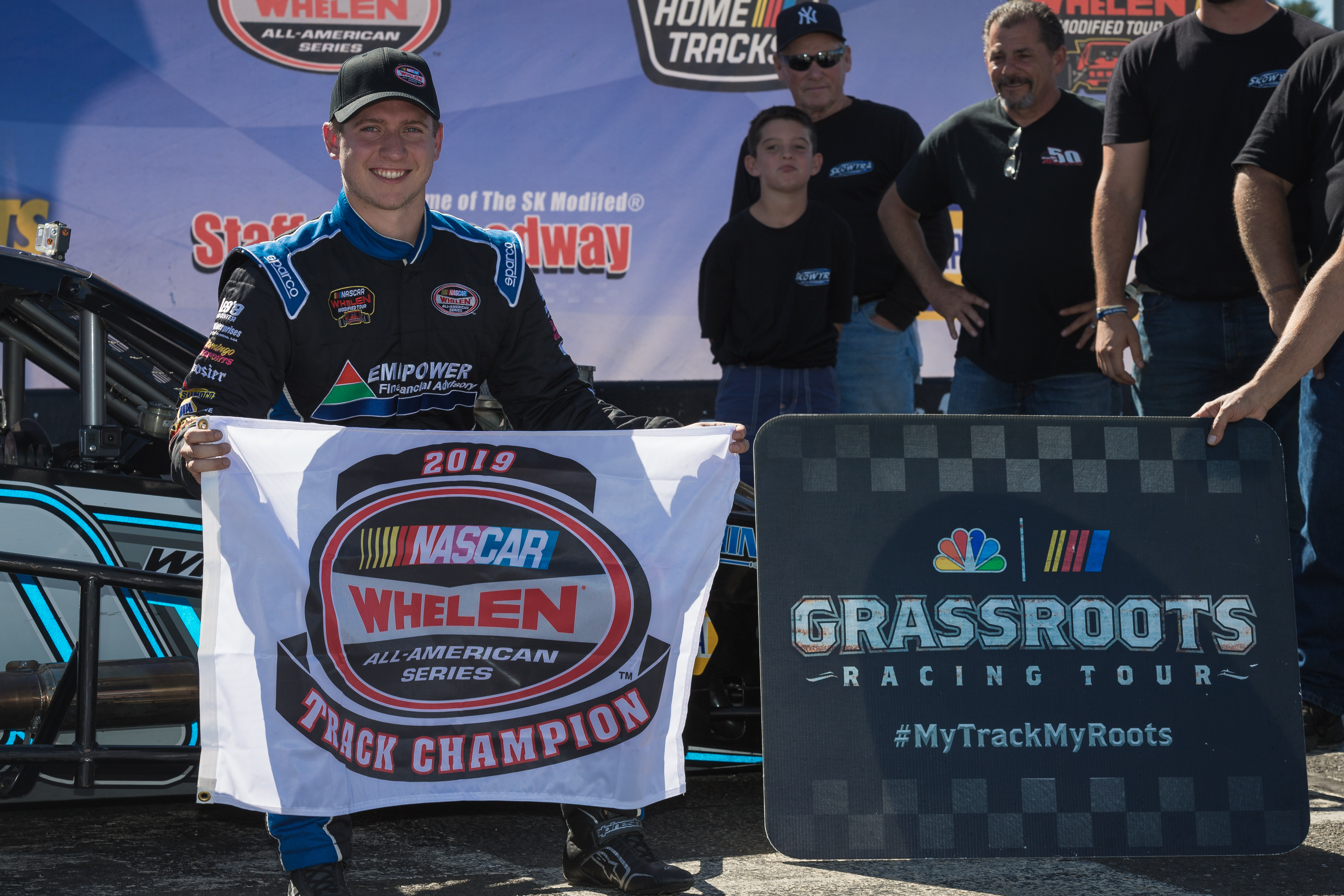
- Williams at Stafford Motor Speedway in 2019
- Nationality: American
- Born: October 8, 1996 (age 30) Ellington, Connecticut, U.S.

NASCAR Whelen Modified Tour career
- Debut season: 2015
- Current team: Ronnie Williams
- Years active: 2015, 2017–2018, 2020–2024, 2026–present
- Car number: 50
- Crew chief: Adam Skowyra
- Starts: 54
- Championships: 0
- Wins: 0
- Poles: 3
- Best finish: 9th in 2018
- Finished last season: 23rd (2026)
- Statistics up to date as of October 12, 2026.

Ronnie Williams (born October 8, 1996) is an American professional stock car racing driver who currently competes part-time in the NASCAR Whelen Modified Tour, driving the No. 50 for his own team. Williams is a two-time SK Modified track champion at Stafford Motor Speedway, winning back to back titles in 2018 and 2019.

Williams has also competed in series such as the Tri-Track Open Modified Series, the Modified Racing Series, the SMART Modified Tour, and the World Series of Asphalt Stock Car Racing.

== Motorsports results ==
=== NASCAR ===
(key) (Bold – Pole position awarded by qualifying time. Italics – Pole position earned by points standings or practice time. * – Most laps led.)

==== Whelen Modified Tour ====
NASCAR Whelen Modified Tour results
Year	Car owner	No.	Make	1	2	3	4	5	6	7	8	9	10	11	12	13	14	15	16	17	18	NWMTC	Pts	Ref
2015	Ted Christopher	59	Chevy	TMP	STA	WAT	STA	TMP	RIV	NHA	MON	STA	TMP	BRI	RIV	NHA	STA; 24	TMP				53rd	20	
2017	Joseph Bertuccio	21	Chevy	MYR	THO	STA	LGY	THO	RIV; 21	NHA; 12	STA; 15	THO	BRI; 8	SEE; 16	OSW; 13	RIV; 11	NHA; 13	STA; 24	THO; 25			21st	283	
2018	Joseph Bertuccio	21	Chevy	MYR; 21	**TMP**; 19	STA; 14	SEE; 6	TMP; 20	LGY; 7	RIV; 10	NHA; 10	STA; 24	TMP; 28	BRI; 6	OSW; 16	RIV; 11	NHA; 26	STA; 11	**TMP**; 14			9th	461	
2020	Paul Les	50	Ford	JEN; 28	WMM	WMM	JEN				STA; 7	TMP; 17										20th	172	
2020	Paul Les	50	Chevy					MND; 5	TMP; 7													20th	172	
2020	Cheryl Tomaino	99	Pontiac							NHA; 28												20th	172	
2021	Paul Les	50	Ford	MAR; 13	STA; 9	RIV	JEN	OSW	RIV			STA; 8	BEE	OSW	RCH; 3	RIV	STA; 10					20th	218	
2021	Cheryl Tomaino	99	Chevy							NHA; 4	NRP											20th	218	
2022	Paul Les	50	Ford	NSM; 12	RCH	RIV; 14	LEE	JEN	MND; 12	RIV	WAL	NHA	CLM	TMP; 20	LGY	OSW	RIV	**TMP**; 16	MAR; 19			23rd	173	
2023	Trey Tomaino	99	Chevy	NSM; 23	RCH	MON	RIV	LEE	SEE	RIV	WAL											42nd	80	
2023	Cheryl Tomaino	99	Chevy									NHA; 12	LMP	THO	LGY	OSW	MON	RIV	NWS			42nd	80	
2023	Paul Les	50	Chevy																	THO; 17	MAR	42nd	80	
2024	Jamie Tomaino	99	Chevy	NSM; 15	RCH	THO	MON	RIV	SEE	NHA	MON	LMP	THO	OSW	RIV	MON	THO	NWS	MAR			61st	29	
2026	Ronnie Williams	50	N/A	NSM	MAR	THO; 27	SEE	RIV	OXF; 4	SEE	CLM	WMM; Wth	MON; 11	THO; 21	NHA; 15	STA; 19	OSW	RIV	THO; Wth			23rd	167	

=== SMART Modified Tour ===
SMART Modified Tour results
Year	Car owner	No.	Make	1	2	3	4	5	6	7	8	9	10	11	12	SMTC	Pts	Ref
2021	Jamie Tomaino	99	N/A	CRW; 20	FLO	SBO	FCS	CRW	DIL	CAR	CRW	DOM	PUL	HCY	ACE	50th	11	
2023	Jamie Tomaino	99NC	PNR	FLO	CRW	SBO	HCY	FCS	CRW; 3	ACE	CAR	PUL	TRI	SBO	ROU	41st	38	
