= 2018 NASCAR Whelen Modified Tour =

The 2018 NASCAR Whelen Modified Tour was the thirty-fourth season of the Whelen Modified Tour (WMT), a stock car racing tour sanctioned by NASCAR. It began with the Performance Plus 150 presented by Safety-Kleen at Myrtle Beach Speedway on 17 March and concluded with the Sunoco World Series 150 at Thompson Speedway Motorsports Park on 14 October. Doug Coby entered the season as the defending Drivers' champion. 2018 marked the second season of the unification of the Whelen (Northern) Modified Tour and the Whelen Southern Modified Tour. Justin Bonsignore won the championship, 97 points ahead of Chase Dowling.

== Drivers ==
No.	Manufacturer	Car Owner	Race Driver	Crew Chief
01	Chevrolet	Kenneth Fifield	Melissa Fifield	Kenneth Fifield 4
01	Chevrolet	Kenneth Fifield	Melissa Fifield	Chad Dow 12
1	Ford 1 Chevrolet 11	Eddie Harvey	Burt Myers 8	Eddie Harvey 9 Jeff Rocco 1 Don Barker 1 Unknown 1
1	Ford 1 Chevrolet 11	Eddie Harvey	Jimmy Blewett 1	Eddie Harvey 9 Jeff Rocco 1 Don Barker 1 Unknown 1
1	Ford 1 Chevrolet 11	Eddie Harvey	Jeff Rocco (R) 3	Eddie Harvey 9 Jeff Rocco 1 Don Barker 1 Unknown 1
2	Chevrolet	Mike Smeriglio III	Doug Coby	Phil Moran
3	Chevrolet	Jan Boehler	Rowan Pennink 10	Greg Fournier
3	Chevrolet	Jan Boehler	Matt Swanson 6	Greg Fournier
04	Chevrolet 2	Brian Midgett	Cory Osland (R) 3	Unknown
04	Ford 1	Brian Midgett	Cory Osland (R) 3	Unknown
5	Chevrolet	Bob Ebersole 2	Kyle Ebersole 2	Bob Ebersole 1
5	Chevrolet	Bob Ebersole 2	Kyle Ebersole 2	Unknown 1
5	Chevrolet	Mark Mina 2	John Beatty Jr. 2	Unknown 2
06	Chevrolet	Randy Rameau	Sam Rameau (R) 1	Danny Stebbins
6	Chevrolet	Ed Partridge	Jimmy Blewett 1	Jeff Preece
6	Chevrolet	Ed Partridge	Ryan Preece 10	Jeff Preece
07	Chevrolet	Jennifer Emerling	Patrick Emerling 6	Jan Leaty
7	Chevrolet	Tommy Baldwin Jr.	Jon McKennedy 14	Tommy Baldwin Jr. 13
7	Chevrolet	Tommy Baldwin Jr.	Jon McKennedy 14	Glenn Dixon 1
11	Chevrolet	Eddie Harvey	Burt Myers 1	Eddie Harvey
14	Chevrolet	Richard Barney	Blake Barney (R) 15	Robert Barney
15	Chevrolet	Rob Fuller	Chase Dowling	Steven Kopcik
16	Ford	Eric Sanderson	Timmy Solomito	Sly Szaban
17	Chevrolet	John Ellwood Jr.	Kyle Ellwood 1	Unknown
18	Chevrolet 6	Robert Pollifrone	Ken Heagy	Desmond Gorman
18	Ford 10	Robert Pollifrone	Ken Heagy	Desmond Gorman
20	Chevrolet	Ken Zachem	Max Zachem 6	Ken Zachem 3
20	Chevrolet	Ken Zachem	Max Zachem 6	Max Zachem 1
20	Chevrolet	Ken Zachem	Max Zachem 6	Timothy Armbruster 2
21	Chevrolet	Joe Bertuccio Sr.	Ronnie Williams	Joe Bertuccio Sr. 1
21	Chevrolet	Joe Bertuccio Sr.	Ronnie Williams	Michael Bologna 15
22	Chevrolet	Kyle Bonsignore	Kyle Bonsignore 7	Bobby Foley
23	Chevrolet	Paul DeGracia	Joe DeGracia (R) 12	Paul DeGracia 3
23	Chevrolet	Paul DeGracia	Joe DeGracia (R) 12	Jimmy Zacharias 9
24	Toyota 7	Diane Krause	Andrew Krause 8	John Cooke 7
24	Chevrolet 1	Diane Krause	Andrew Krause 8	Brian Hendrickson 1
25	Chevrolet	Joe Carroll	Calvin Carroll	Stash Butova 9
25	Chevrolet	Joe Carroll	Calvin Carroll	Joe Carroll 7
26	Chevrolet	Sean McDonald	Gary McDonald	Chad McDonald 14
26	Chevrolet	Sean McDonald	Gary McDonald	Gary McDonald 2
32	Chevrolet	Dean Rypkema	Tyler Rypkema (R) 1	Unknown
33	Chevrolet	Wade Cole	Wade Cole	Rick Rodenbaugh
34	Chevrolet	Nicole Fortin	J. B. Fortin (R) 1	Unknown
35	Ford	Mike Molleur	Andrew Molleur (R) 1	Rob Fuller
36	Chevrolet	Judy Thilberg	Dave Sapienza	Tommy Grasso
38	Chevrolet	Linda Rodenbaugh 5 Rick Rodenbaugh 2	Manny Dias (R) 1	Bobby Bourne
38	Chevrolet	Linda Rodenbaugh 5 Rick Rodenbaugh 2	Dave Salzarulo 5	Bobby Bourne
38	Chevrolet	Linda Rodenbaugh 5 Rick Rodenbaugh 2	Kyle Ellwood 1	Bobby Bourne
40	Chevrolet	Gina Fleming	Frank Fleming 1	Talmage Thomas
44	Chevrolet	Sully Tinio	Bobby Santos III 9	Bob Santos
46	Chevrolet	Russell Goodale	Craig Lutz	Doug Ogiejko
51	Chevrolet	Ken Massa	Justin Bonsignore	Ryan Stone
54	Chevrolet	Amy Catalano	Tommy Catalano (R)	Dave Catalano
57	Chevrolet	Bryan Dauzat	Andy Seuss 4	Todd Cooper 3
57	Chevrolet	Bryan Dauzat	Andy Seuss 4	Steve Seuss 1
58	Chevrolet	Edgar Goodale	Eric Goodale	Jason Shephard
60	Chevrolet	Roy Hall	Matt Hirschman 4	Mike Stein 1
60	Chevrolet	Roy Hall	Matt Hirschman 4	Matt Hirschman 3
63	Chevrolet	Steve Pickens	Austin Pickens 4	Jeff DeMinck 4 Unknown 1
63	Chevrolet	Steve Pickens	Ray Parent (R) 1	Jeff DeMinck 4 Unknown 1
64	Chevrolet	Mike Murphy	Rob Summers	Steve Lemay
66	Chevrolet	Jerry Solomito Sr.	Shawn Solomito 4	Unknown 3
66	Chevrolet	Jerry Solomito Sr.	Shawn Solomito 4	Jerry Solomito Sr. 1
75	Chevrolet	Charles Pasteryak	Chris Pasteryak 14	Cam McDermott 4
75	Chevrolet	Charles Pasteryak	Chris Pasteryak 14	Nick Walsh 10
76	Chevrolet	John Blewett Sr.	Jimmy Blewett 6	Rob Ormsbee
77	Chevrolet	Mike Curb	Gary Putnam 9	Teddy Musgrave Jr.
77	Chevrolet	Mike Curb	Ryan Newman 1	Teddy Musgrave Jr.
77	Chevrolet	Mike Curb	Ryan Preece 1	Teddy Musgrave Jr.
78	Chevrolet	Steven Sutcliffe	Walter Sutcliffe Jr. 14	Kevin Anderson 13
78	Chevrolet	Steven Sutcliffe	Walter Sutcliffe Jr. 14	Steven Sutcliffe 1
82	Chevrolet	Danny Watts Jr. 8 Pamela Hulse 8	Woody Pitkat 13	Jarod Zeltmann
82	Chevrolet	Danny Watts Jr. 8 Pamela Hulse 8	Spencer Davis 1	Jarod Zeltmann
82	Chevrolet	Danny Watts Jr. 8 Pamela Hulse 8	Tom Rogers Jr. 2	Jarod Zeltmann
84	Chevrolet	Nicole Fortin	John Fortin 2	Unknown
85	Chevrolet	Kevin Stuart	Ron Silk 10	Kenny Stuart
88	Chevrolet	Pat Kennedy	Roger Turbush (R) 2	Raymond Bouchard 1
88	Chevrolet	Pat Kennedy	Roger Turbush (R) 2	Unknown 1
89	Ford	John Swanson	Matt Swanson 6	John Swanson
91	Chevrolet	Steven Booker	Kyle Ellwood 1	Unknown
92	Chevrolet	Anthony Nocella	Anthony Nocella 5	Unknown 1
92	Chevrolet	Anthony Nocella	Anthony Nocella 5	Steve Murphy 3
92	Chevrolet	Anthony Nocella	Anthony Nocella 5	Jesse Vasconcellos 1
95	Chevrolet	Wayne Anderson	Kyle Soper (R) 3	Tom Soper
97	Chevrolet	Bryan Dauzat	Andy Seuss 1	Todd Cooper
97	Chevrolet	Bryan Dauzat	Bryan Dauzat 2	Todd Cooper
97	Chevrolet	Bryan Dauzat	Todd Cooper (R) 1	Todd Cooper
98	Chevrolet	Don Parsons	Ray Parent (R) 3	Scott Allen
99	Chevrolet	Cheryl Tomaino	Jamie Tomaino 3	Cheryl Tomaino

== Schedule ==
On 22 November 2017, NASCAR announced the 2018 schedule. Charlotte was dropped from the schedule. The All-Star Shootout did not count towards the championship. The Icebreaker 150, the Thompson 125 and the Musket 250 were broadcast live on FansChoice.tv. Eleven of the seventeen races in the season were televised on NBCSN on a tape delay basis.

No.	Race title	Track	Date	TV
1	Performance Plus 150 presented by Safety-Kleen	Myrtle Beach Speedway, Myrtle Beach, South Carolina	17 March	NBCSN
2	Icebreaker 150	Thompson Speedway Motorsports Park, Thompson, Connecticut	8 April	FansChoice.tv
3	NAPA Auto Parts Spring Sizzler 200	Stafford Motor Speedway, Stafford, Connecticut	29 April	
4	Seekonk 150	Seekonk Speedway, Seekonk, Massachusetts	2 June	NBCSN
5	Thompson 125	Thompson Speedway Motorsports Park, Thompson, Connecticut	14 June (Note: The Thompson 125 was postponed a day because of impending weather.)	FansChoice.tv
6	WhosYourDriver.org 150	Langley Speedway, Hampton, Virginia	23 June	NBCSN
7	Buzz Chew Auto Group 200	Riverhead Raceway, Riverhead, New York	7 July	
	All-Star Shootout	New Hampshire Motor Speedway, Loudon, New Hampshire	20 July	NBCSN
8	Eastern Propane & Oil 100	New Hampshire Motor Speedway, Loudon, New Hampshire	21 July	NBCSN
9	Starrett 150	Stafford Motor Speedway, Stafford, Connecticut	3 August	
10	Bud 'King of Beers' 150	Thompson Speedway Motorsports Park, Thompson, Connecticut	8 August	NBCSN
11	Bush's Beans 150	Bristol Motor Speedway, Bristol, Tennessee	15 August	NBCSN
12	Toyota Mod Classic 150	Oswego Speedway, Oswego, New York	1 September	NBCSN
13	Miller Lite 200	Riverhead Raceway, Riverhead, New York	8 September	NBCSN
14	Musket 250	New Hampshire Motor Speedway, Loudon, New Hampshire	22 September	FansChoice.tv; NBCSN
15	NAPA Fall Final 150	Stafford Motor Speedway, Stafford, Connecticut	30 September	NBCSN
16	Sunoco World Series 150	Thompson Speedway Motorsports Park, Thompson, Connecticut	14 October	NBCSN

== Results and standings ==
=== Races ===
No.	Race	Pole position	Most laps led	Winning driver	Manufacturer
1	Performance Plus 150 presented by Safety-Kleen	Matt Hirschman	Matt Hirschman	Jon McKennedy	Chevrolet
2	Icebreaker 150	Ronnie Williams	Chase Dowling	Justin Bonsignore	Chevrolet
3	NAPA Auto Parts Spring Sizzler 200	Chase Dowling	Ryan Preece	Ryan Preece	Chevrolet
4	Seekonk 150	Justin Bonsignore	Justin Bonsignore	Justin Bonsignore	Chevrolet
5	Thompson 125	Doug Coby	Doug Coby	Justin Bonsignore	Chevrolet
6	WhosYourDriver.org 150	Ryan Preece	Ryan Preece	Ryan Preece	Chevrolet
7	Buzz Chew Auto Group 200	Justin Bonsignore	Ryan Preece	Justin Bonsignore	Chevrolet
	All-Star Shootout	Rob Summers^{1}	Justin Bonsignore	Justin Bonsignore	Chevrolet
8	Eastern Propane & Oil 100	Ryan Newman	Justin Bonsignore	Bobby Santos III	Chevrolet
9	Starrett 150	Chase Dowling	Rowan Pennink	Doug Coby	Chevrolet
10	Bud 'King of Beers' 150	Justin Bonsignore	Justin Bonsignore	Justin Bonsignore	Chevrolet
11	Bush's Beans 150	Justin Bonsignore	Justin Bonsignore	Justin Bonsignore	Chevrolet
12	Toyota Mod Classic 150	Matt Hirschman	Matt Hirschman	Matt Hirschman	Chevrolet
13	Miller Lite 200	Doug Coby^{2}	Timmy Solomito	Justin Bonsignore	Chevrolet
14	Musket 250	Chase Dowling	Justin Bonsignore	Chase Dowling	Chevrolet
15	NAPA Fall Final 150	Justin Bonsignore	Chase Dowling	Kyle Bonsignore	Chevrolet
16	Sunoco World Series 150	Ronnie Williams	Ryan Preece	Justin Bonsignore	Chevrolet

Notes

- ^{1} – There was no qualifying session for the All-Star Shootout. The starting grid was decided with a random draw.
- ^{2} – The qualifying session for the Miller Lite 200 was cancelled due to weather. The starting line-up was decided by Practice results.

=== Drivers' championship ===
(key) Bold – Pole position awarded by time. Italics – Pole position set by final practice results or Owners' points. * – Most laps led.

Pos.	Driver	MYR	THO	STA	SEE	THO	LGY	RIV	NHA‡	NHA	STA	THO	BRI	OSW	RIV	NHA	STA	THO	Points
1	Justin Bonsignore	5	1	8	**1***	1	2	**1**	1*	4*	7	**1***	**1***	2	1	6*	**12**	1	693
2	Chase Dowling	4	8*	**2**	2	9	6	7		2	**25**	4	2	12	3	**1**	4*	30	596
3	Doug Coby	14	6	21	12	**3***	24	3	2	26	1	3	5	3	4	7	3	6	575
4	Timmy Solomito	12	10	9	7	6	4	5	11	17	5	10	15	8	2*	18	9	28	545
5	Craig Lutz	9	2	5	10	7	27	6	16	19	6	8	11	11	13	17	2	12	541
6	Rob Summers	10	7	11	11	8	13	22	15	12	13	16	3	18	10	11	6	18	515
7	Eric Goodale	7	27	30	19	11	5	18	3	5	3	11	10	5	14	9	25	10	495
8	Dave Sapienza	6	25	24	9	5	19	4	20	13	29	14	7	22	5	13	7	26	477
9	Ronnie Williams	21	**19**	14	6	20	7	10		10	24	DNS^{1}	6	16	11	26	11	**14**	461
10	Chris Pasteryak	18	11	18	15	13	9	11			10	9		25	9	20	8	9	431
11	Tommy Catalano **(R)**	Wth	15	16	8	22	23	12		18	19	20	12	10	12	15	15	19	424
12	Blake Barney **(R)**	11	31	27	14	17	10	16		31	14	13		9	15	21	17	16	398
13	Ryan Preece		4	1*	27	4	**1***	2*	6	28		23		19		5		4*	381
14	Woody Pitkat	27	12	25	26	15			9	14	2	6	19	4		14	18	13	379
15	Calvin Carroll	8	16	29	24	21	16	23	13	34	12	19	DNS^{1}	24	18	31	16	23	368
16	Gary McDonald	17	17	23	18	24	17	27		21	17	22	16	21	19	27	21	33	364
17	Wade Cole	24	18	17	23	27	21	26		22	21	21	17	23	17	23	22	24	358
18	Jon McKennedy	1	20	6	25	29	Wth		4	11	23	12	Wth	15		8	26	2	357
19	Ken Heagy	26	Wth	15	16	23	18	21		24	18	25	20	13	21	24	20	22	354
20	Rowan Pennink	INJ	3	3	4	2	8	20	14	6	4*		8						341
21	Matt Swanson		5	7	30	10			10	8	DNS^{1}	2		6	23	30	29	7	341
22	Melissa Fifield	25	30	20	22	28	22	30		30	28	26	21	20	20	25	24	31	302
23	Burt Myers	16	13			19		14			26		9			3	10	5	282
24	Ron Silk		24	26	5	Wth			18	7	11	27				10	5	3	279
25	Bobby Santos III		9	12		Wth			5	1	22	5				22	23	8	256
26	Gary Putnam	15		13	17		14				16	15	14	Wth		QL^{2}		21	228
27	Joe DeGracia **(R)**	20	22	19	21	26	25	28		23	20	24		Wth				Wth	213
28	Patrick Emerling		33	4					19	9			4	7		2		Wth	207
29	Kyle Bonsignore	23	34	31			11				9						1	15	189
30	Andrew Krause		14	Wth	13	18				16		7					28	27	185
31	Walter Sutcliffe Jr.	Wth	35	22	DNS^{1}	25	26	24		33	27	DNS^{1}	Wth	Wth			30	25	177
32	Matt Hirschman	**3***			3		3							**1***					175
33	Jimmy Blewett	2	28	32		14					8	Wth					14	Wth	168
34	Anthony Nocella				20					15						12	13	11	149
35	Andy Seuss	13	26						7	27			13			4			138
36	Shawn Solomito			10		12									8			20	126
37	Ray Parent **(R)**					16					15	17	Wth						84
38	Dave Salzarulo			28						32						19	31	32	78
39	Jamie Tomaino	19							17	25						16			72
40	Austin Pickens		29	Wth								18	18						67
41	John Beatty Jr.							15							7				66
42	John Fortin							17							6				65
43	Jeff Rocco **(R)**				28		15									29			60
44	Kyle Ebersole						12							17					59
45	Tom Rogers Jr.							8							22				58
46	Cory Osland **(R)**							29							24			29	50
47	Kyle Soper **(R)**		32					9							Wth				47
48	Roger Turbush **(R)**							25							16				47
49	Kyle Ellwood				29			13							Wth				46
50	Bryan Dauzat		23						12	20									45
51	Ryan Newman								8	**3**									42
52	Max Zachem		36	Wth		Wth				29							27	Wth	40
53	Tyler Rypkema **(R)**													14					30
54	Sam Rameau **(R)**																	17	27
55	J. B. Fortin **(R)**							19											25
56	Andrew Molleur **(R)**																19		25
57	Spencer Davis						20												24
58	Manny Dias **(R)**		21																23
59	Frank Fleming	22																	22
60	Todd Cooper **(R)**															28			16
Pos.	Driver	MYR	THO	STA	SEE	THO	LGY	RIV	NHA‡	NHA	STA	THO	BRI	OSW	RIV	NHA	STA	THO	Points

Notes

- ^{‡} – Non-championship round.
- ^{1} – Calvin Carroll, Walter Sutcliffe Jr., Matt Swanson and Ronnie Williams received championship points, despite the fact that they did not start the race.
- ^{2} – Gary Putnam qualified in the No. 77 for Ryan Preece.

== See also ==
- 2018 Monster Energy NASCAR Cup Series
- 2018 NASCAR Xfinity Series
- 2018 NASCAR Camping World Truck Series
- 2018 NASCAR K&N Pro Series East
- 2018 NASCAR K&N Pro Series West
- 2018 NASCAR Pinty's Series
- 2018 NASCAR PEAK Mexico Series
- 2018 NASCAR Whelen Euro Series
