= Ken Barry =

American racing driver

- Nationality: American
- Born: May 3, 1970 (age 56) Preston, Connecticut, U.S.

NASCAR Whelen Modified Tour career
- Debut season: 1997
- Years active: 1997–1998, 2003–2006
- Starts: 53
- Championships: 0
- Wins: 0
- Poles: 0
- Best finish: 9th in 2004
- Statistics up to date as of September 17, 2024.

Ken Barry (born May 3, 1970) is an American former professional stock car racing driver who competed in the NASCAR Whelen Modified Tour from 1999 to 2010. His father was the legendary Art Barry, who founded Spearpoint Automotive and SPAFCO Race Chassis, who fielded the No. 21 car that was piloted to many victories and championships across New England.

Barry has a son named Tyler, who also competes in various modified divisions.

Barry has also previously competed in the Modified Racing Series and the Race of Champions Asphalt Modified Tour.

== Motorsports results ==
=== NASCAR ===
(key) (Bold – Pole position awarded by qualifying time. Italics – Pole position earned by points standings or practice time. * – Most laps led.)

==== Whelen Modified Tour ====
NASCAR Whelen Modified Tour results
Year	Team	No.	Make	1	2	3	4	5	6	7	8	9	10	11	12	13	14	15	16	17	18	19	20	21	22	23	NWMTC	Pts	Ref
1997	N/A	2	Chevy	TMP	MAR	STA	NZH	STA	NHA	FLE	JEN	RIV	GLN	NHA	RPS	HOL	TMP	RIV	NHA	GLN	STA	NHA	STA; 34	FLE	TMP	RCH	N/A	0	
1998	N/A	12	Chevy	RPS	TMP	MAR	STA	NZH	STA	GLN	JEN	RIV	NHA; 39	NHA	LEE	HOL	TMP	NHA	RIV	STA	NHA; 36	TMP	STA	TMP	FLE		N/A	0	
2003	Art Barry	21	Chevy	TMP	STA; 11	WFD					BEE; 9	NHA	ADI; 28	RIV	TMP	STA; DNQ	WFD; DNQ	TMP	NHA	STA	TMP						45th	454	
2003	Art Barry	22	Chevy				NZH; 37	STA	LER	BLL																	45th	454	
2004	Art Barry	20	Chevy	TMP; 16	STA; 13	WFD; 16	NZH; 2	STA; 18	RIV; 24	LER; 29	WAL; 8	BEE; 13	NHA; 9	SEE; 16	RIV; 20	STA; 7	TMP; 14	WFD; 8	TMP; 12	NHA; 9	STA; 7	TMP; 5					9th	2397	
2005	Art Barry	21	Chevy	TMP; 12	STA; 28	RIV; 10	WFD; 30	STA; 29	JEN; 11	NHA; 21	BEE; 26	SEE; 20	RIV	STA	TMP	WFD	MAR	TMP; 14	NHA	STA; 12	TMP; 9						25th	1293	
2006	Art Barry	21	Chevy	TMP; 29	STA; 16	JEN; 18	TMP; 10	STA; 31	NHA; 35	HOL; 11	RIV; DNQ	STA; 2	TMP; 24	MAR; 22	TMP; 21	NHA; 15	WFD; 30	TMP; 32	STA; 2								17th	1642	
