= Jennerstown Speedway Complex =

Auto racing venue

- Location: Jennerstown, Pennsylvania
- Coordinates: 40.1588°N 79.0721°W
- Capacity: 7,500
- Owner: John Morocco, Larry Hemminger, and Richard Pologruto
- Opened: 1920s (original); May 10, 2014 (reopening)
- Former names: Jennerstown Speedway
- Major events: UARA National Tour; International Supermodified Association; ROC Modifieds; Super Late Model

Oval
- Surface: Asphalt
- Length: 0.522 mi (0.840 km)
- Turns: 4
- Banking: Straights: 6°; Turns: 9°

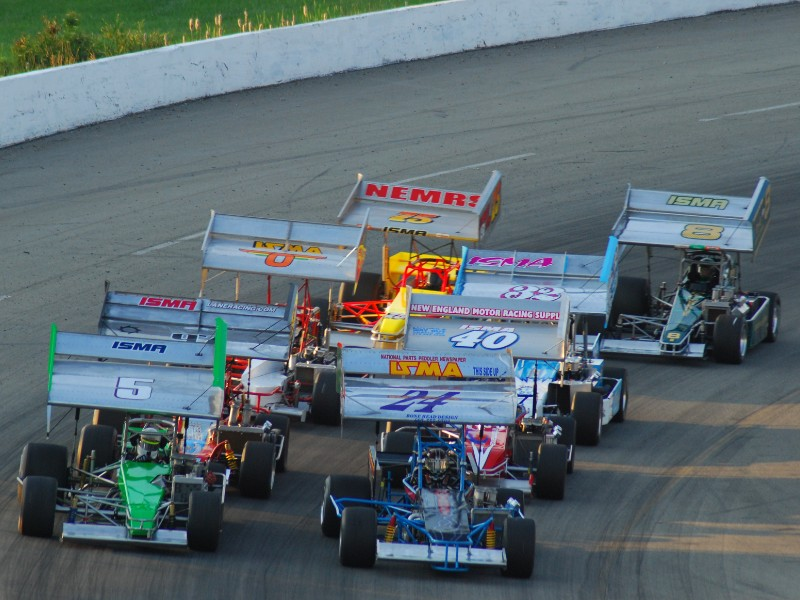
ISMA Super Modifieds in Turn 4 at Jennerstown Speedway, 2007

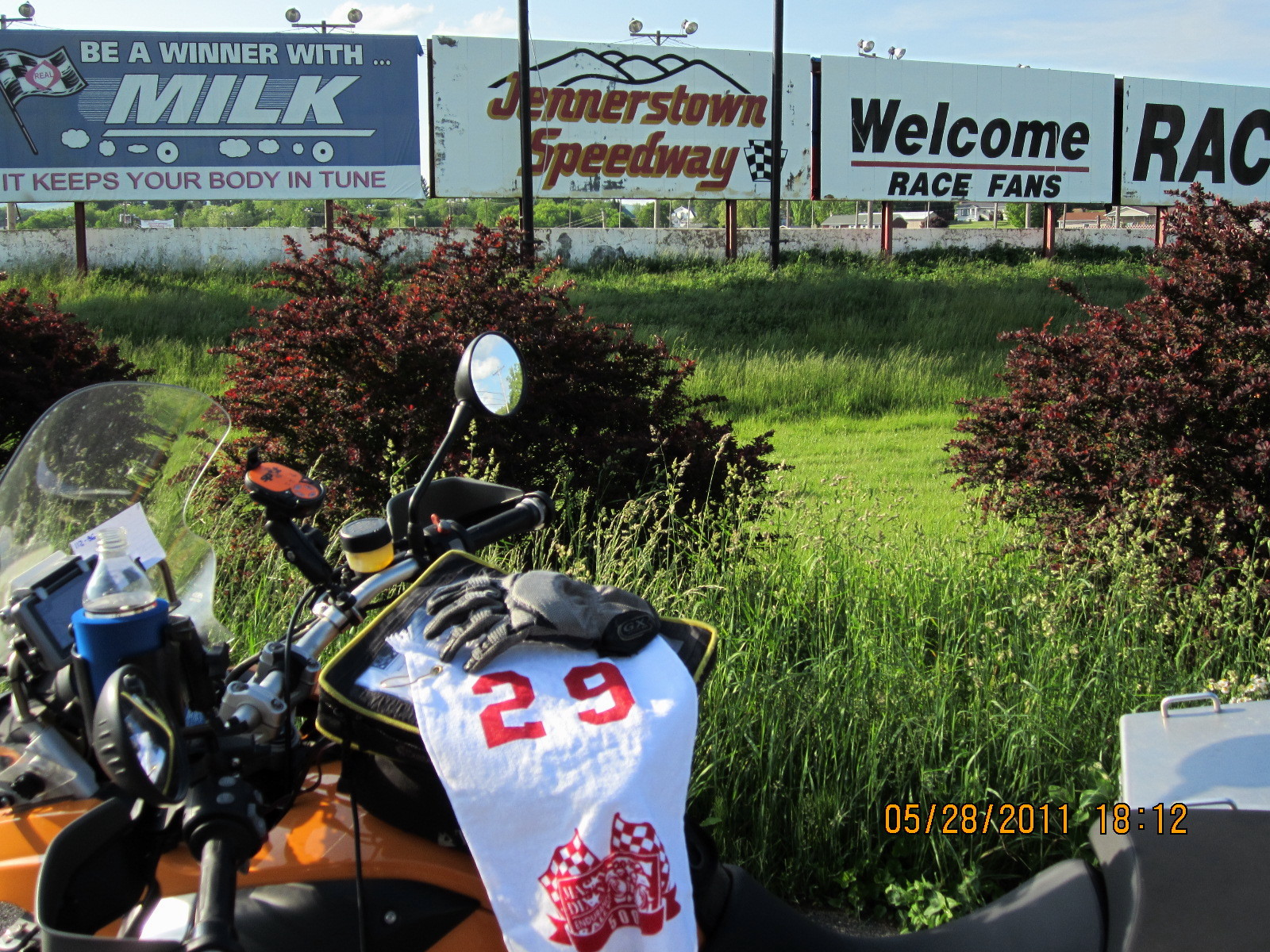
Jennerstown Speedway

Jennerstown Speedway Complex is a racetrack in Jennerstown, Pennsylvania. Built on land that was once home to the Jenners Fair the track had its start in the 1920s as a flat, half-mile dirt track. After several changes, advancements and owners the track closed in 2009 until early 2014 when it was reopened. It is a NASCAR certified track, racing greats such as Dale Earnhardt, Sterling Marlin, Ken Schrader, and Darrell Waltrip.

Jennerstown Speedway, one of the oldest short-track facilities in the United States, has undergone a number of transformations leading up to today’s state-of-the-art motorsports complex.

== Track history ==
Constructed in the late 1920s as a flat half-mile dirt oval, the Jenners Fairgrounds, as the speedway was then known, played host to ‘big car’ racing (forerunners to the sprint cars of today) during the 1930s. Among the leading local drivers of that era were Butch Gardner and the ‘Pennsylvania coal miner’, Mike (Little) Serokman.

Following World War II a smaller, lighted dirt quarter mile track was built in the infield in 1953. Laird Brunner became the first weekly promoter to present stock car racing, which had replaced the midgets as the post-war entertainment craze sweeping the nation. At that time the half-mile was abandoned. The half mile track was again rebuilt in 1967 and was used briefly. Brunner was followed by the successful promotional team of Carmen Amica/Dick Basserman, who guided the speedway during the early 1960s. Other promoters during the quarter mile era included Lou Smith and George Kittey. The half-mile was restored and briefly used in the mid-1960s, but was quickly closed again due to poor track conditions. During this early era, drivers such as Fuzzy Rubritz, Blackie Watt, Jimmy Burns, Joe Viglione and Johnny Grum thrilled motorsports enthusiasts at the track which featured outlaw and Penn Western Racing Association-sanctioned contests.

In 1967, local businessmen John Frambaugh, Sam Turrillo, Bill Philson, John Philson, Doc Whiney, Harry Horne and Piney Lasky purchased the grounds and completely rebuilt the track into one of the fastest half-mile dirt ovals in the nation and immediately began a major modernization project. Over time Lasky became the sole owner of the facility, and in 1987 made the decision to move Jennerstown to the next level by paving the track and bringing asphalt racing back to Western PA for the first time since the Heidelberg Raceway closed in 1973. Lasky upgraded the grandstand and concession areas, as well as affiliated the track with NASCAR, and brought major sanctioned events to the Somerset County speedplant.

Jennerstown Speedway Complex hosted 16 NASCAR Busch North Series events between 1987 and 2000, one NASCAR Southeast Series event in 1992 and 14 NASCAR Whelen Modified Tour between 1990 and 2006. The Modified Tour returned to the track in 2020, after a 14 year absence.

After Lasky died unexpectedly in 1994, his son, Stanley Jr. took over and ran the operation for the next five seasons, before selling to former speedway late model champion Steve Peles and Hooters Restaurants founder, Bob Brooks, in 2000. After three seasons, Peles and Brooks sold the track to Dave Wheeler, who initiated an immediate upgrade in operations. Wheeler repaved the oval in 2004 with a $350,000 polymer-based racing surface.

=== 2009 closure ===
At the end of the 2008 season, it was rumored that the track wouldn't reopen for the 2009 season. In February 2009, Wheeler said in an interview that the speedway won't open this season and is listed for sale. Claiming he wouldn't be able to continue his full-time job and run a speedway.

=== 2014 reopening ===
Race enthusiasts and racers themselves, new owners Bryan Smith, Rob Beck and John Taylor held a meeting at a local fire hall to discuss the details of the former raceway. After a larger than expected crowd made up of mostly drivers and owners, it was decided the track would reopen in May 2014. In addition to local divisions, the track also hosts series such as the International Supermodified Association and ROC Modifieds. Aside from the usual races, also planned were events such as swap meets, car shows and educational classes.

== Asphalt Late Model Track Champions ==
- 1987 Steve Peles
- 1988 Steve Peles
- 1989 Steve Peles
- 1990 Steve Peles
- 1991 Glenn Gault
- 1992 Glenn Gault
- 1993 Charlie Cragan
- 1994 Charlie Cragan
- 1995 Jeff Dunmyer
- 1996 Jeff Dunmyer
- 1997 Jeff Dunmyer
- 1998 Mark Cottone
- 1999 Richard Mitchell
- 2000 Barry Awtey
- 2001 Neil Brown
- 2002 Neil Brown
- 2003 Barry Awtey
- 2004 Garry Wiltrout
- 2005 Tommy Beck
- 2006 Mark Smith
- 2007 Barry Awtey
- 2008 Jason Mignogna
- 2009–2013 closed
- 2014 Barry Awtey
- 2015 Matt Sever
- 2016 Barry Awtey
- 2017 Jeremiah Kuntz
- 2018 Garry Wiltrout
- 2019 Teddy Gibala
- 2020 Albert Francis
- 2021 Barry Awtey
- 2022 Barry Awtey
- 2023 Barry Awtey
- 2024 Barry Awtey

== Career Asphalt Late Model Wins 1987-2024 ==
- 84 Barry Awtey
- 46 Steve Peles
- 42 Mark Smith
- 37 Charlie Cragan
- 36 Glenn Gault
- 36 Garry Wiltrout
- 30 Jeff Dunmyer
- 23 Bobby Henry
- 21 Neil Brown
- 19 Mark Cottone
- 17 Richard Mitchell
- 15 Bob Arsenberger
- 14 Teddy Gibala
- 12 Matt Sever
- 10 Tom Eriksen
- 10 Tim Ice
- 10 Rick Miller
- 9 Dave Houpt
- 9 Jeremiah Kuntz
- 9 Kyle Martel
- 9 Jason Mignogna
- 9 Bryan Shipp
- 8 Clate Husted
- 7 Joe Maruca
- 6 Jarred Barclay
- 6 Mike Hemminger
- 5 Albert Francis
- 4 Shawn Beam
- 4 Tommy Beck
- 4 Mark Poole
- 3 Brad Cole
- 3 Owen Houpt
- 3 Kenny Imler
- 3 Will Hemminger
- 2 Ed Ferree
- 2 Travis Fisher
- 2 Chuck Kennedy
- 2 Chuck Keslar
- 2 Robby Marhefka
- 2 Bob Sibila
- 2 Evan Shotko
- 2 Mike Sweeney
- 2 Dan White
- 1 Doug Alexander
- 1 Tim Bainey, Jr.
- 1 Jayme Beck
- 1 Cory Casagrande
- 1 Eric Corbett
- 1 Brad Creighton
- 1 Alkie Cunningham
- 1 Butch Derkas
- 1 Mike Eddy
- 1 Zane Ferrell
- 1 Cale Gale
- 1 Derek Griffith
- 1 Mike Hopkins
- 1 Brandan Marhefka
- 1 Ethan Myers
- 1 Pete Orr
- 1 Cody Quarrick
- 1 Dave Russell
- 1 Jeremy Shaffer
- 1 Brad Smales
- 1 Todd Stone
- 1 Will Thomas
- 1 Brett Tressler
