= Oswego Speedway =

Asphalt race track in Oswego, New York

The Steel Palace
- Location: 300 East Albany Street, Oswego, NY 13126
- Coordinates: 43°27′25″N 76°29′04″W
- Opened: 1951
- Former names: Wine Creek Horse Track
- Major events: Current: NASCAR Whelen Modified Tour (1988–1989, 2016–2019, 2021–2026)
- Website: www.oswegospeedway.com

Paved Oval (1961–present)
- Surface: Asphalt
- Length: 0.625 mi (1.006 km)
- Banking: 13°

Paved Oval (1952–1960)
- Surface: Asphalt
- Length: 0.604 km (0.375 mi)

Dirt Oval (1952–1960)
- Surface: Dirt
- Length: 0.604 km (0.375 mi)

The Oswego Speedway is a 0.625 mi (1.006 km) mile race track in Oswego, New York. It was built in 1951 and was paved with asphalt since 1952. The track has held dates on several national tours - the NASCAR Whelen Modified Tour, ASA National Tour, and USAC Silver Crown Series. It is temporarily covered with dirt every year when it holds Super Dirt Week in October. The track is the Labor Day Weekend home of the 200-lap, non-wing, big-block supermodified Budweiser Classic and Race of Champions (a modified touring series event).

== History ==
Oswego Speedway began as a horse racing track. The track was converted to a 0.375 mi (0.604 km) mile dirt track in 1951. The track was paved in 1952. The track was lengthened from 0.375 to 0.625 mi (0.604 to 1.006 km) pavement track in 1962.

Owned and operated for more than four decades by the Caruso family, the "Big O" is now owned and operated by Eric and John Torrese.

In 2016 Oswego Speedway hosted the 45th edition of World Racing Group's Super DIRTcar Series Super DIRT Week. The track received the date on the schedule after construction of Central New York Raceway Park was delayed. The speedway was covered by approximately 6,900 cubic feet of clay for DIRTcar modified drivers to compete in the NAPA 300, the richest dirt modified race in the world. The event took place on October 5 to 9, 2016. It was the first time that the track had a dirt surface since 1952. The state of New York spent $1.1 million in renovations to the speedway that year. It received a new scoreboard and bleachers; the campgrounds got plumbing and electricity upgrades. The 2020 season was cancelled due to the COVID-19 pandemic.

The speedway signed an online streaming agreement in 2021 for FloRacing to broadcast weekly Oswego Speedway races.

== Contact information ==
The track is located at 300 East Albany Street, Oswego, NY 13126, about 35 miles northwest of Syracuse near State Highway 481 just off Rt. 104; telephone 315-342-0646. The facility has covered and uncovered grandstands on the north side, as well as uncovered grandstands the south. Total seating is =/- 10,000.

Unpaved, open-field parking is available on both sides of Albany Street to the north and east of the "oval" track surface. (It is not truly an oval, but is more of a "four-corner" track. Banking is about thirteen degrees.)

== Annual events ==
Greg Furlong has won the Labor Day Weekend Classic event six times since 1999, and has finished on the podium on two other occasions. Famed Indianapolis 500 drivers Davey Hamilton, Bentley Warren and Joe Gosek are all Budweiser Classic winners. Warren won the Budweiser Classic six times from 1969 through 1998, as well as winning the ISMA Supernationals winged supermodified event in 1994 and 2006 (at the age of 66).

Some Race of Champions winners have participated in NASCAR events. These include Brett Bodine, 1986 Daytona 500 winner Geoff Bodine, NASCAR Hall of Famer and modified legend Richie Evans, Brian Ross, Greg Sacks, Frankie Schneider,Jimmy Spencer and current Cup Series driver Ryan Preece

== Racing vehicles ==
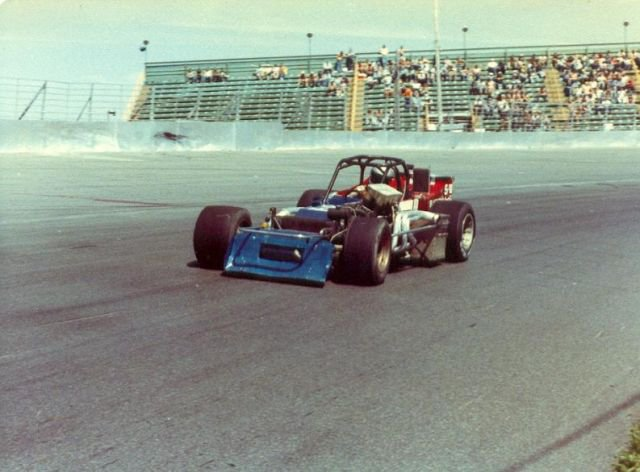
Oswego supermodified in 1978

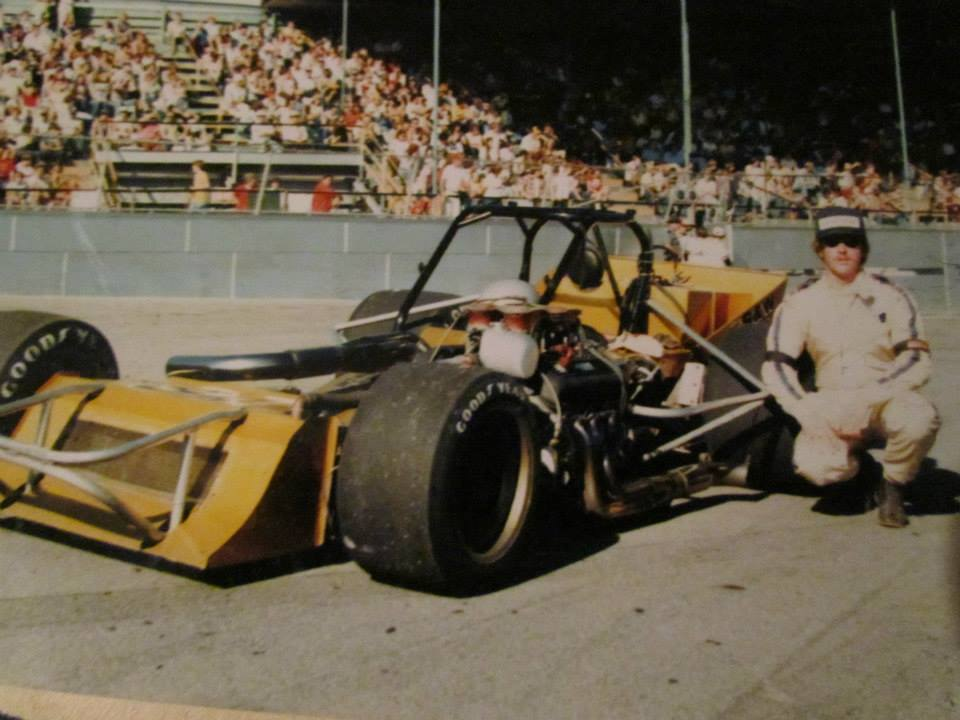
Oswego supermodified in 1979

Oswego is the last track in the world to utilize supermodifieds in its weekly programs. The modern supermodified car is a front-engine / rear-drive vehicle with a big block Chevrolet engine mounted on the left side of the chassis to maximize kinetic force for left turns on the 5/8-mile, asphalt track. The normally aspirated, fuel-injected engines make 900 or more horsepower, or one horsepower or more for each two pounds of weight (1800-lb. minimum). Up to and including the 2018 season, Oswego supermodifieds were unwinged, having wedge-shaped bodywork to provide downforce. The fastest non-wing supermodifieds were capable of circling the track in less than 16.5 seconds, averaging better than 136 miles per hour in the process. For the 2019 season, Oswego supermodifieds will utilize fixed rear-wings for downforce.

Oswego Speedway supermodified class track champions have included multi-time champs Otto Sitterly (nine times, 2006-2014, 2018, 2019), Nolan Swift (eight times, 1953–71), Bentley Warren (seven times, 1983–93), Jim Shampine (seven times, 1967–79), Greg Furlong (four times, 2000–07), Eddie Bellinger, Sr. (three times, 1957–60), Doug Didero (three times, 1994–96) and Mike Muldoon (three times, 1997-1999).

Other classes running regularly at Oswego Speedway during the season that extends from April through September include the Oswego Speedway Small Block Supermodifieds and 350 Winged Supermodifieds. It has featured DART Asphalt Modified Tour cars and Buckeye Super (winged asphalt) Sprint Cars. The track also hosts the International Supermodified Association (ISMA) and Midwest Supermodified Association (MSA) supermodifieds (both having air-strut adjustable top wings). Some Whelen Modified drivers occasionally race at Oswego including Matt Hirschman, his father Tony, Zane Zeiner, and Bryon Chew.

The fastest winged supermodifieds are capable of lapping the track in the low 15-second range at average speeds of 150 miles per hour, generating gravity forces of 4.0 and up.

== Track Records ==
As of July 2025, track records on the 5/8 mile (1.006 km) oval are followed as:

Category	Time	Driver	Date
Paved Oval (1961–present): 1.006 km
Winged ISMA / MSS Big Block Supermodified	0:14.611	Mike Ordway Jr.	July 9th, 2022
Oswego Big Block Supermodified Rear Wing	0:15.394	Michael Barnes	September 2nd, 2022
Oswego Big Block Supermodified Tail Section	0:15.802	Joey Payne	August 29th, 2014
350 Winged Small Block Supermodified	0:16.561	Jeffrey Battle	May 29th, 2021
NASCAR Whelen Modified Tour	0:17.550	Rob Summers	August 31st, 2019
Small Block/Limited Supermodified	0:18.431	Russ Brown	August 31st, 2018
