= Christopher Hatton (disambiguation) =

Christopher Hatton (1540–1591) was Lord Chancellor of England.

Christopher Hatton may also refer to:

- Christopher Hatton (died 1619) (1581–1619), MP for Buckingham, Bedford and Huntingdon
- Christopher Hatton, 1st Baron Hatton (1605–1670), MP and prominent Royalist during the English Civil War
- Christopher Hatton, 1st Viscount Hatton (1632–1706), English aristocrat and diplomat
- Chris Hatton (born 1957), Australian politician
- Chris Hatton Jr., American stock car racing driver
