= Austin Beers =

American racing driver

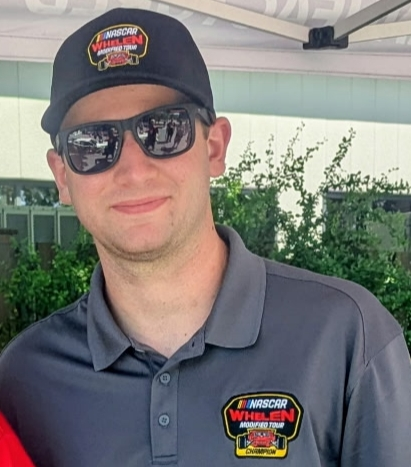
- Beers in 2026
- Born: March 23, 2003 (age 23) Northampton, Pennsylvania, U.S.

NASCAR Whelen Modified Tour career
- Debut season: 2021
- Current team: KLM Motorsports
- Years active: 2021–present
- Car number: 64
- Crew chief: Ron Yuhas
- Starts: 86
- Championships: 1
- Wins: 5
- Poles: 14
- Best finish: 1st in 2025
- Finished last season: 2nd (2026)
- Statistics up to date as of October 12, 2026.

Austin Beers (born March 23, 2003) is an American professional stock car racing driver who competes full-time in the NASCAR Whelen Modified Tour, driving the No. 64 for KLM Motorsports. He is the 2025 NASCAR Whelen Modified Tour champion.

Beers is the son of Eric Beers, who competed in the series from 1997 to 2012.

Beers made his debut in the series in 2021, driving the No. 64 for Mike Murphy and KLM Motorsports while driving a partial schedule, where he earned one top-ten finish at Richmond Raceway. He then ran the full-schedule with Murphy in 2022, where he finished fifth in the points with seven top-ten finishes and won rookie of the year honors.

Before the 2026 season, Beers competed in Kaulig Racing's "Race For the Seat", competing against 14 other drivers to try to win a full-season ride in the teams No. 14 truck.

Beers has also competed in series such as the Modified Racing Series, the Tri-Track Open Modified Series, the Race of Champions Asphalt Modified Tour, and the World Series of Asphalt Stock Car Racing. He has driven for his family owned team, Dave Delange, Jimmy Zacharias, Prestige Motorsports, BRE Racing with Michael Boehler, and Jimmy Paige among others. He made his debut in SK Modifieds at Stafford Motor Speedway in 2024 driving for former competitor Tom Bolles.

== Motorsports results ==
=== NASCAR ===
(key) (Bold – Pole position awarded by qualifying time. Italics – Pole position earned by points standings or practice time. * – Most laps led.)

==== Whelen Modified Tour ====
NASCAR Whelen Modified Tour Results
Year	Car Owner	No.	Make	1	2	3	4	5	6	7	8	9	10	11	12	13	14	15	16	17	18	NWMTC	Pts	Ref
2021	KLM Motorsports	64	Chevy	MAR	STA	RIV	JEN	OSW	RIV	NHA	NRP	STA	BEE	OSW; 20	RCH; 7	RIV; 15	STA; 13					28th	121	
2022	KLM Motorsports	64	Chevy	NSM; 11	RCH; 11	RIV; 13	LEE; 7	JEN; 12	MND; 8	RIV; 9	WAL; 7	NHA; 11	CLM; 11	TMP; 16	LGY; 3	OSW; 12	RIV; 6	TMP; 11	MAR; 8			5th	548	
2023	KLM Motorsports	64	Chevy	NSM; 8	**RCH**; 1*	MON; 4	RIV; 17	LEE; 3	SEE; 8	**RIV**; 10	**WAL**; 9*	NHA; 4	LMP; 1*	**THO**; 4	**LGY**; 2*	OSW; 2	MON; 2	RIV; 4	**NWS**; 14	THO; 10*	MAR; 31	3rd	677	
2024	KLM Motorsports	64	Chevy	NSM; 6	RCH; 26	THO; 7	MON; 2	RIV; 2	SEE; 2*	NHA; 9	**MON**; 10	LMP; 1*	THO; 8	OSW; 5	RIV; 5	**MON**; 10	THO; 4	**NWS**; 3	MAR; 4			4th	611	
2025	KLM Motorsports	64	Chevy	NSM; 5	THO; 4	NWS; 5	SEE; 3	RIV; 8	WMM; 5	LMP; 1	MON; 5	**MON**; 9	THO; 7	RCH; 2*	OSW; 4	NHA; 9	RIV; 1	THO; 3	MAR; 2			1st	649	
2026	KLM Motorsports	64	Chevy	NSM; 3	MAR; 5	THO; 6	SEE; 4	RIV; 7	OXF; 11	**SEE**; 5	CLM; 4	WMM; 2	MON; 3	**THO**; 2	**NHA**; 19*	STA; 15	**OSW**; 6	RIV; 8	THO; 7			2nd	607	

=== SMART Modified Tour ===
SMART Modified Tour Results
Year	Car Owner	No.	Make	1	2	3	4	5	6	7	8	9	10	11	12	13	14	SMTC	Pts	Ref
2024	Jensen Motorsports	179	N/A	FLO	CRW	SBO	TRI	ROU	HCY	FCS	CRW	JAC	CAR	CRW	DOM	SBO	NWS; 5	45th	36	

=== Race of Champions Modified Series ===
Race of Champions Modified Series Results
Year	Car Owner	No.	Make	1	2	3	4	5	6	7	8	9	10	11	Standings	Pts	Ref
2018	Beers Motorsports	19	N/A	LMP	LKE	LMP	JUK	HOL	LMP	CHE	LMP	SPN	LMP	LKE; 23	39th	62	
2019	Beers Motorsports	19	N/A	CHE; 16	SPN; 19	LMP; 14	JUK; 18	SPN; 14	CHE; 17	LMP; 18	SPN; 12	LMP; 18	LKE; 5		12th	601	
2020	DeLange Racing	45	N/A	LKE; 9	LKE; 4	LKE; 3	MAH; 2								2nd	448	
2021	DeLange Racing	45	N/A	MAH; 2	CHE; 3	SPN; 10	CHE; 2	HOL; 9	SPN; 5	LKE; 6					1st	664	
2022	DeLange Racing	45	N/A	SPN; 5	LMP; 7	SPN; 23	HOL; 4	LMP; 2	CHE; 3	SPN; 4	LMP; 3				2nd	731	
2023	DeLange Racing Beers Motorsports Zacharias Racing	45 9 71	N/A	MAH; 9	CHE; 1	LOR; 7	SPN; 20	LMP	SPN	LMP; 4	CHE; 1	SPN; 11	LKE; 6	LMP; 7	5th	854	
2024	DeLange Racing Beers Motorsports Zacharias Racing	45 9 71	N/A	MAH; 9	MAH	CHE; 2	LMP	EVA	HOL; 5	CHE; 15	SPN	LKE; 3			11th	481	
2025	DeLange Racing Beers Motorsports Zacharias Racing	45 9 71	N/A	MAH; 1	CHE; 2	LMP; 8	EVA; 2	SPN; 15	HOL; 5	CHE; 3	LMP; 4	SPN; 25	LKE; 7	THO; 8	2nd	1004	

Sporting positions
Preceded by Justin Bonsignore	NASCAR Whelen Modified Tour Champion; 2025	Succeeded by Patrick Emerling
