= Joey Braun =

American racing driver (born 2002)

- Nationality: American
- Born: April 20, 2002 (age 24) Manorville, New York, U.S.

SMART Modified Tour career
- Debut season: 2025
- Years active: 2025–present
- Teams: Buddy Ellis
- Car number: 24
- Starts: 25
- Championships: 0
- Wins: 0
- Poles: 1
- Best finish: 8th in 2025
- Statistics up to date as of October 17, 2026.

Joey Braun (born April 20, 2002) is an American professional stock car racing driver who currently competes in the SMART Modified Tour, driving the No. 24 for Buddy Ellis, having previously driven the No. 79 for David & Susan Hill. Braun grew up running legends at his home track of Riverhead Raceway, before moving up to the tracks crate modified division.

Braun has also competed in the NASCAR Whelen Modified Tour, the SEST Limited Late Models Series, the Southeast Legends Tour, and the NASCAR Weekly Series.

== Motorsports results ==
=== NASCAR ===
(key) (Bold – Pole position awarded by qualifying time. Italics – Pole position earned by points standings or practice time. * – Most laps led.)

==== Whelen Modified Tour ====
NASCAR Whelen Modified Tour results
Year	Car owner	No.	Make	1	2	3	4	5	6	7	8	9	10	11	12	13	14	15	16	NWMTC	Pts	Ref
2025	Hill Enterprises	79	Chevy	NSM	THO	NWS; 8	SEE	RIV	WMM	LMP	MON	MON	THO	RCH	OSW	NHA	RIV	THO	MAR	54th	36	
2026	Highmark Racing Team	4	N/A	NSM	MAR	THO	SEE	RIV	OXF	SEE	CLM	WMM	MON	THO	NHA	STA	OSW	RIV; 6	THO; 19	37th	63	

=== SMART Modified Tour ===
SMART Modified Tour results
Year	Car owner	No.	Make	1	2	3	4	5	6	7	8	9	10	11	12	13	14	SMTC	Pts	Ref
2025	Hill Enterprises	79	PSR	FLO; 3	AND; 15	SBO; 7	ROU; 9	HCY; 5	FCS; 5*	CRW; 21	CPS; 18	CAR; 8	CRW; 17	DOM; 16	**FCS**; 4	TRI; 8	NWS; 26	8th	425	
2026	Buddy Ellis	24	N/A	FLO; 4	AND; 8	SBO; 9	DOM; 2	HCY; 21	WKS; 14	FCR; 9	CRW; 9	PUL; 13	CAR; 14	ROU				11th	339	
2026	Factory 39 Racing	39	N/A												TRI; Wth	NWS; 16		11th	339	
