= Bryce Bailey =

American racing driver (born 2005 or 2006)

- Nationality: American
- Born: 2005 or 2006 (age 20–21) Cedar Rapids, Iowa, U.S.

SMART Modified Tour career
- Debut season: 2024
- Years active: 2024–present
- Starts: 19
- Championships: 0
- Wins: 0
- Poles: 3
- Best finish: 15th in 2025
- Statistics up to date as of October 10, 2026.

Bryce Bailey (born 2005 or 2006) is an American professional stock car racing driver who currently competes part-time in the SMART Modified Tour, driving the No. 39 for Factory 39 Racing, having previously driven the No. 15 for Grady Jeffreys Jr., and the No. 17 for PSR Racing.

Bailey has also competed in series such as the GRIT Racing Series, the Race of Champions Asphalt Modified Tour, the INEX Summer Shootout Series, and the World Series of Asphalt Stock Car Racing.

== Motorsports results ==
=== SMART Modified Tour ===
SMART Modified Tour results
Year	Car owner	No.	Make	1	2	3	4	5	6	7	8	9	10	11	12	13	14	SMTC	Pts	Ref
2024	N/A	23NY	N/A	FLO; 21	CRW	SBO; 30	TRI	ROU	HCY; 19	FCS	CRW	JAC	CAR	CRW	DOM	SBO	NWS	38th	53	
2025	Grady Jeffreys Jr.	15	N/A	FLO; 14	AND; 17	SBO; 24	ROU; 8	HCY; 3	FCS; 18	CRW; 14								15th	287	
2025	PSR Racing	17	N/A								CPS; 8	CAR; 14	CRW	DOM	FCS			15th	287	
2025	James French	12PA	N/A													TRI; 24		15th	287	
2025	Jamie Tomaino	99	N/A														NWS; 24	15th	287	
2026	Factory 39 Racing	39	N/A	FLO	AND; 24	SBO		HCY; 23	WKS; Wth	FCR	CRW; 19	PUL	CAR					22nd	123	
2026	Paul French	12	N/A				DOM; Wth							ROU; 3				22nd	123	
2026	Jamie Tomaino	99	N/A												TRI; 13	NWS		22nd	123	
