= Jacob Lutz =

American racing driver

- Nationality: American
- Born: February 12, 1999 (age 27) Hamburg, New York, U.S.

NASCAR Whelen Modified Tour career
- Debut season: 2024
- Years active: 2024–2025
- Starts: 12
- Championships: 0
- Wins: 0
- Poles: 0
- Best finish: 18th in 2025
- Finished last season: 18th (2025)
- Statistics up to date as of October 24, 2025.

Jacob "Jake" Lutz (born February 12, 1999) is an American professional stock car racing driver who last competed part-time in the NASCAR Whelen Modified Tour, driving the No. 14 for Joe Stearns.

Lutz is not related to fellow driver Craig Lutz, who also competes in the Modified Tour, despite sharing the same last name.

Lutz has previously competed in series such as the Race of Champions Asphalt Modified Tour and the Race of Champions Asphalt Sportsman Modified Series. In 2025, Lutz won the prestigious Race of Champions 250 at Lake Erie Speedway, his biggest career win to date.

== Motorsports results ==
=== NASCAR ===
(key) (Bold – Pole position awarded by qualifying time. Italics – Pole position earned by points standings or practice time. * – Most laps led.)

==== Whelen Modified Tour ====
NASCAR Whelen Modified Tour results
Year	Car owner	No.	Make	1	2	3	4	5	6	7	8	9	10	11	12	13	14	15	16	NWMTC	Pts	Ref
2024	Joe Stearns	14	Chevy	NSM	RCH	THO	MON	RIV	SEE; 6	NHA; 25	MON	LMP; 8	THO	OSW; 6	RIV	MON	THO	NWS	MAR; 3	19th	172	
2025	Joe Stearns	14	Chevy	NSM; 31	THO; Wth	NWS; 4	SEE	RIV	WMM	LMP; 5	MON	MON	THO; 10	RCH	OSW; 6	NHA; 26	RIV	THO	MAR; 25	18th	201	

=== SMART Modified Tour ===
SMART Modified Tour results
Year	Car owner	No.	Make	1	2	3	4	5	6	7	8	9	10	11	12	13	14	SMTC	Pts	Ref
2025	Joe Stearns	14	N/A	FLO	AND	SBO	ROU	HCY; 11	FCS	CRW	CPS	CAR	CRW	DOM	FCS	TRI	NWS	46th	30	
2026	Joe Stearns	14NY	N/A	FLO	AND	SBO; DNS	DOM	HCY	WKS	FCR	CRW	PUL	CAR	ROU	TRI	NWS		79th	8	
