= Justin Brown (racing driver) =

American racing driver

- Nationality: American
- Born: August 24, 2002 (age 24) Manorville, New York, U.S.

NASCAR Whelen Modified Tour career
- Debut season: 2023
- Years active: 2023–2024
- Starts: 8
- Championships: 0
- Wins: 0
- Poles: 0
- Best finish: 25th in 2023
- Finished last season: 57th (2024)
- Statistics up to date as of April 16, 2025.

Justin Brown (born August 24, 2002) is an American professional stock car racing driver who last competed part-time in the NASCAR Whelen Modified Tour, driving the No. 24 for Fred Brown.

Brown's father is the owner of FB Performance Transmissions, a transmission shop in Bay Shore, New York.

Brown has previously competed in series such as the Advance Auto Parts Weekly Series, and has primarily competed in various modified events and Riverhead Raceway.

== Motorsports results ==
=== NASCAR ===
(key) (Bold – Pole position awarded by qualifying time. Italics – Pole position earned by points standings or practice time. * – Most laps led.)

==== Whelen Modified Tour ====
NASCAR Whelen Modified Tour results
Year	Car owner	No.	Make	1	2	3	4	5	6	7	8	9	10	11	12	13	14	15	16	17	18	NWMTC	Pts	Ref
2023	Russell Goodale	46	Chevy	NSM; 15	RCH; 15	MON; 19	RIV; 18	LEE; 13	SEE; 14	RIV; 18	WAL	NHA	LMP	THO	LGY	OSW	MON	RIV	NWS	THO	MAR	25th	196	
2024	Fred Brown	24	Chevy	NSM	RCH	THO	MON	RIV; 12	SEE	NHA	MON	LMP	THO	OSW	RIV	MON	THO	NWS	MAR			57th	32	
