= 2025 Boys & Girls Club of the Blue Ridge 200 =

5th race of the 2025 NASCAR Craftsman Truck Series

Race details
- Race 5 of 25 of the 2025 NASCAR Craftsman Truck Series
- Date: March 28, 2025
- Location: Martinsville Speedway in Ridgeway, Virginia
- Course: Permanent racing facility
- Course length: 0.526 miles (0.847 km)
- Distance: 200 laps, 105 mi (169 km)
- Scheduled distance: 200 laps, 105 mi (169 km)
- Average speed: 57.364 mph (92.318 km/h)

Pole position
Driver	Corey Heim	Tricon Garage
- Time: 19.654

Most laps led
Driver	Corey Heim	Tricon Garage
- Laps: 149

Winner
No. 19	Daniel Hemric	McAnally-Hilgemann Racing

Television in the United States
- Network: FS1
- Announcers: Jamie Little, Joey Logano, and Michael Waltrip

Radio in the United States
- Radio: NRN

The 2025 Boys & Girls Club of the Blue Ridge 200 was the 5th stock car race of the 2025 NASCAR Craftsman Truck Series, and the 27th iteration of the event. The race was held on Friday, March 28, 2025, at Martinsville Speedway in Ridgeway, Virginia, a 0.526 miles (0.847 km) permanent asphalt paperclip-shaped short track. The race took the scheduled 200 laps to complete.

In an action-packed race, Daniel Hemric, driving for McAnally-Hilgemann Racing, would make a late race pass on teammate Tyler Ankrum, and led the final four laps to earn his first career NASCAR Craftsman Truck Series win in his 55th start. Corey Heim continued to have a dominating performance, winning both stages and leading a race-high 149 laps, before being spun late in the race, rebounding to finish 6th. To fill out the podium, Jake Garcia, driving for ThorSport Racing, would finish in 3rd, respectively.

This was also the first race of the Triple Truck Challenge. Hemric won the race and was granted the $50K bonus cash.

== Report ==
=== Background ===
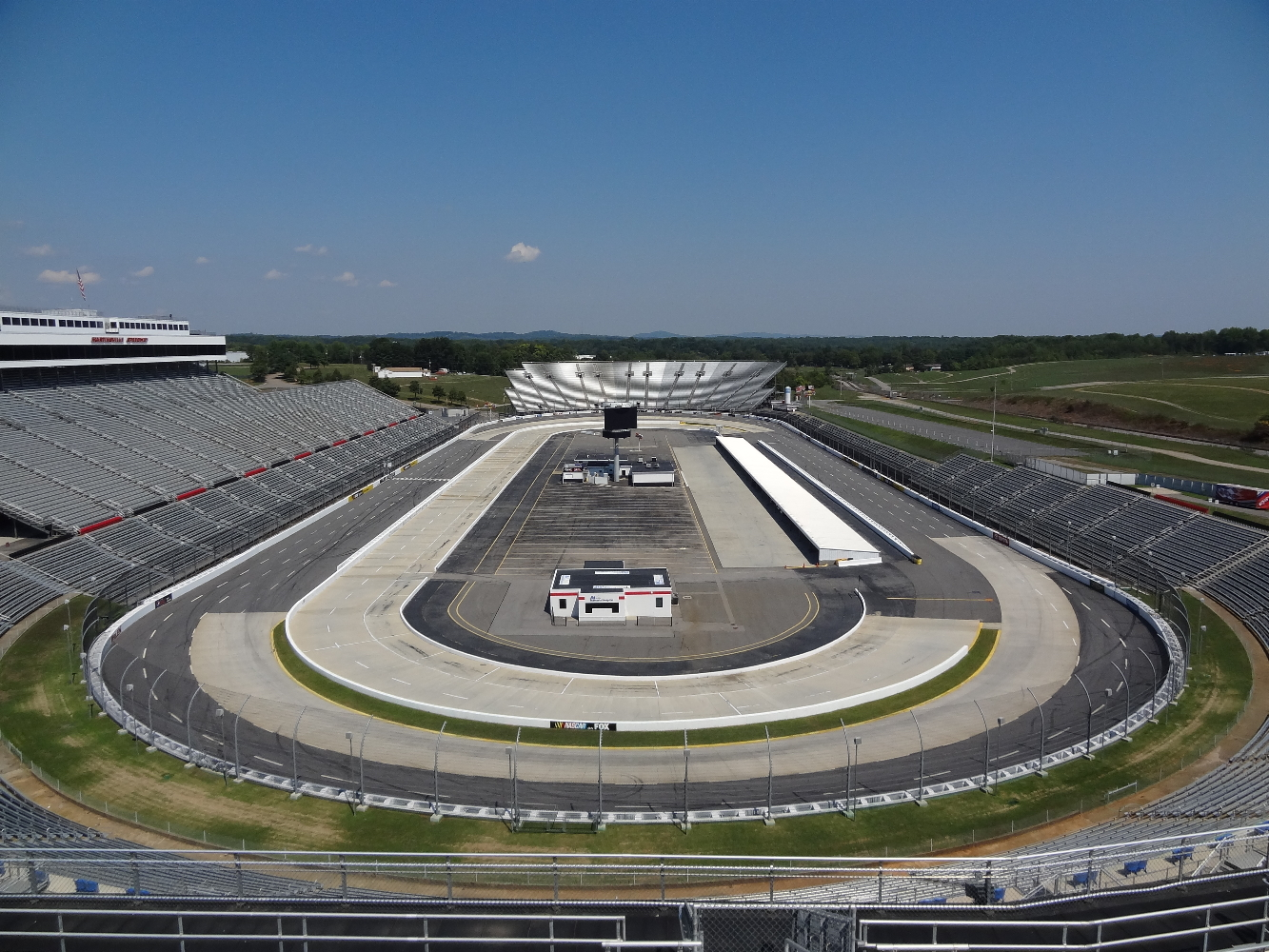
Martinsville Speedway, the track where the race was held.

Martinsville Speedway is a NASCAR-owned stock car racing track located in Henry County, in Ridgeway, Virginia, just to the south of Martinsville. At 0.526 miles (0.847 km) in length, it is the shortest track in the NASCAR Cup Series. The track was also one of the first paved oval tracks in NASCAR, being built in 1947 by H. Clay Earles. It is also the only remaining race track on the NASCAR circuit since its beginning in 1948.

==== Entry list ====
- (R) denotes rookie driver.
- (i) denotes driver who is ineligible for series driver points.

#	Driver	Team	Make
1	Lawless Alan	Tricon Garage	Toyota
02	Nathan Byrd	Young's Motorsports	Chevrolet
2	Cody Dennison	Reaume Brothers Racing	Ford
5	Toni Breidinger (R)	Tricon Garage	Toyota
6	Norm Benning	Norm Benning Racing	Chevrolet
07	William Byron (i)	Spire Motorsports	Chevrolet
7	Corey Day (i)	Spire Motorsports	Chevrolet
9	Grant Enfinger	CR7 Motorsports	Chevrolet
11	Corey Heim	Tricon Garage	Toyota
13	Jake Garcia	ThorSport Racing	Ford
15	Tanner Gray	Tricon Garage	Toyota
17	Gio Ruggiero (R)	Tricon Garage	Toyota
18	Tyler Ankrum	McAnally-Hilgemann Racing	Chevrolet
19	Daniel Hemric	McAnally-Hilgemann Racing	Chevrolet
22	A. J. Waller	Reaume Brothers Racing	Ford
26	Dawson Sutton (R)	Rackley W.A.R.	Chevrolet
33	Frankie Muniz (R)	Reaume Brothers Racing	Ford
34	Layne Riggs	Front Row Motorsports	Ford
38	Chandler Smith	Front Row Motorsports	Ford
42	Matt Mills	Niece Motorsports	Chevrolet
44	Matt Gould	Niece Motorsports	Chevrolet
45	Kaden Honeycutt	Niece Motorsports	Chevrolet
52	Stewart Friesen	Halmar Friesen Racing	Toyota
66	Luke Baldwin	ThorSport Racing	Ford
67	Ryan Roulette	Freedom Racing Enterprises	Chevrolet
71	Rajah Caruth	Spire Motorsports	Chevrolet
76	Spencer Boyd	Freedom Racing Enterprises	Chevrolet
77	Andrés Pérez de Lara (R)	Spire Motorsports	Chevrolet
81	Connor Mosack (R)	McAnally-Hilgemann Racing	Chevrolet
84	Patrick Staropoli (i)	Cook Racing Technologies	Toyota
88	Matt Crafton	ThorSport Racing	Ford
90	Justin Carroll	TC Motorsports	Toyota
91	Jack Wood	McAnally-Hilgemann Racing	Chevrolet
98	Ty Majeski	ThorSport Racing	Ford
99	Ben Rhodes	ThorSport Racing	Ford
Official entry list

== Practice ==
For practice, drivers would be split into two groups, A and B, with both sessions being 25 minutes long, and was held on Friday, March 28, at 2:05 PM EST. Luke Baldwin, driving for ThorSport Racing, would set the fastest time between both sessions, with a lap of 20.270, and a speed of 94.419 mph (151.953 km/h).

Pos.	#	Driver	Team	Make	Time	Speed
1	66	Luke Baldwin	ThorSport Racing	Ford	20.270	93.419
2	99	Ben Rhodes	ThorSport Racing	Ford	20.302	93.272
3	11	Corey Heim	Tricon Garage	Toyota	20.311	93.230
Full practice results

== Qualifying ==
Qualifying was held on Friday, March 28, at 3:10 PM EST. Since Martinsville Speedway is a short track, the qualifying system used is a single-car, two-lap system with one round. Drivers will be on track by themselves and will have two laps to post a qualifying time, and whoever sets the fastest time will win the pole.

Corey Heim, driving for Tricon Garage, would score the pole for the race, with a lap of 19.654, and a speed of 96.347 mph (155.055 km/h).

No drivers would fail to qualify.

=== Qualifying results ===
Pos.	#	Driver	Team	Make	Time	Speed
1	11	Corey Heim	Tricon Garage	Toyota	19.654	96.347
2	98	Ty Majeski	ThorSport Racing	Ford	19.711	96.068
3	45	Kaden Honeycutt	Niece Motorsports	Chevrolet	19.730	95.976
4	38	Chandler Smith	Front Row Motorsports	Ford	19.733	95.961
5	19	Daniel Hemric	McAnally-Hilgemann Racing	Chevrolet	19.763	95.815
6	15	Tanner Gray	Tricon Garage	Toyota	19.819	95.545
7	34	Layne Riggs	Front Row Motorsports	Ford	19.845	95.420
8	13	Jake Garcia	ThorSport Racing	Ford	19.855	95.371
9	1	Lawless Alan	Tricon Garage	Toyota	19.859	95.352
10	71	Rajah Caruth	Spire Motorsports	Chevrolet	19.884	95.232
11	81	Connor Mosack (R)	McAnally-Hilgemann Racing	Chevrolet	19.886	95.223
12	52	Stewart Friesen	Halmar Friesen Racing	Toyota	19.928	95.022
13	07	William Byron (i)	Spire Motorsports	Chevrolet	19.939	94.970
14	88	Matt Crafton	ThorSport Racing	Ford	19.941	94.960
15	7	Corey Day (i)	Spire Motorsports	Chevrolet	19.950	94.917
16	17	Gio Ruggiero (R)	Tricon Garage	Toyota	19.951	94.913
17	91	Jack Wood	McAnally-Hilgemann Racing	Chevrolet	19.960	94.870
18	44	Matt Gould	Niece Motorsports	Chevrolet	19.996	94.699
19	9	Grant Enfinger	CR7 Motorsports	Chevrolet	20.000	94.680
20	99	Ben Rhodes	ThorSport Racing	Ford	20.003	94.666
21	77	Andrés Pérez de Lara (R)	Spire Motorsports	Chevrolet	20.055	94.420
22	26	Dawson Sutton (R)	Rackley W.A.R.	Chevrolet	20.058	94.406
23	42	Matt Mills	Niece Motorsports	Chevrolet	20.063	94.383
24	18	Tyler Ankrum	McAnally-Hilgemann Racing	Chevrolet	20.099	94.214
25	5	Toni Breidinger (R)	Tricon Garage	Toyota	20.164	93.910
26	76	Spencer Boyd	Freedom Racing Enterprises	Chevrolet	20.372	92.951
27	66	Luke Baldwin	ThorSport Racing	Ford	20.459	92.556
28	22	A. J. Waller	Reaume Brothers Racing	Ford	20.515	92.303
29	90	Justin Carroll	TC Motorsports	Toyota	20.521	92.276
30	02	Nathan Byrd	Young's Motorsports	Chevrolet	20.562	92.092
31	33	Frankie Muniz (R)	Reaume Brothers Racing	Ford	20.603	91.909
Qualified by owner's points
32	2	Cody Dennison	Reaume Brothers Racing	Ford	20.617	91.847
33	6	Norm Benning	Norm Benning Racing	Chevrolet	21.152	89.523
34	67	Ryan Roulette	Freedom Racing Enterprises	Chevrolet	21.158	89.498
35	84	Patrick Staropoli (i)	Cook Racing Technologies	Toyota	21.159	89.494
Official qualifying results
Official starting lineup

== Race results ==
Stage 1 Laps: 50

Pos.	#	Driver	Team	Make	Pts
1	11	Corey Heim	Tricon Garage	Toyota	10
2	45	Kaden Honeycutt	Niece Motorsports	Chevrolet	9
3	98	Ty Majeski	ThorSport Racing	Ford	8
4	81	Connor Mosack (R)	McAnally-Hilgemann Racing	Chevrolet	7
5	15	Tanner Gray	Tricon Garage	Toyota	6
6	38	Chandler Smith	Front Row Motorsports	Ford	5
7	19	Daniel Hemric	McAnally-Hilgemann Racing	Chevrolet	4
8	1	Lawless Alan	Tricon Garage	Toyota	3
9	07	William Byron (i)	Spire Motorsports	Chevrolet	0
10	52	Stewart Friesen	Halmar Friesen Racing	Toyota	1

Stage 2 Laps: 50

Pos.	#	Driver	Team	Make	Pts
1	11	Corey Heim	Tricon Garage	Toyota	10
2	45	Kaden Honeycutt	Niece Motorsports	Chevrolet	9
3	98	Ty Majeski	ThorSport Racing	Ford	8
4	81	Connor Mosack (R)	McAnally-Hilgemann Racing	Chevrolet	7
5	19	Daniel Hemric	McAnally-Hilgemann Racing	Chevrolet	6
6	38	Chandler Smith	Front Row Motorsports	Ford	5
7	15	Tanner Gray	Tricon Garage	Toyota	4
8	07	William Byron (i)	Spire Motorsports	Chevrolet	0
9	18	Tyler Ankrum	McAnally-Hilgemann Racing	Chevrolet	2
10	1	Lawless Alan	Tricon Garage	Toyota	1

Stage 3 Laps: 100

Fin	St	#	Driver	Team	Make	Laps	Led	Status	Pts
1	5	19	Daniel Hemric	McAnally-Hilgemann Racing	Chevrolet	200	4	Running	50
2	24	18	Tyler Ankrum	McAnally-Hilgemann Racing	Chevrolet	200	10	Running	37
3	8	13	Jake Garcia	ThorSport Racing	Ford	200	0	Running	34
4	4	38	Chandler Smith	Front Row Motorsports	Ford	200	0	Running	43
5	20	99	Ben Rhodes	ThorSport Racing	Ford	200	0	Running	32
6	1	11	Corey Heim	Tricon Garage	Toyota	200	149	Running	52
7	21	77	Andrés Pérez de Lara (R)	Spire Motorsports	Chevrolet	200	0	Running	30
8	10	71	Rajah Caruth	Spire Motorsports	Chevrolet	200	17	Running	29
9	12	52	Stewart Friesen	Halmar Friesen Racing	Toyota	200	0	Running	29
10	9	1	Lawless Alan	Tricon Garage	Toyota	200	0	Running	31
11	7	34	Layne Riggs	Front Row Motorsports	Ford	200	0	Running	26
12	16	17	Gio Ruggiero (R)	Tricon Garage	Toyota	200	0	Running	25
13	2	98	Ty Majeski	ThorSport Racing	Ford	200	0	Running	40
14	13	07	William Byron (i)	Spire Motorsports	Chevrolet	200	0	Running	0
15	23	42	Matt Mills	Niece Motorsports	Chevrolet	200	0	Running	22
16	22	26	Dawson Sutton (R)	Rackley W.A.R.	Chevrolet	200	0	Running	21
17	26	76	Spencer Boyd	Freedom Racing Enterprises	Chevrolet	200	0	Running	20
18	29	90	Justin Carroll	TC Motorsports	Toyota	200	0	Running	19
19	17	91	Jack Wood	McAnally-Hilgemann Racing	Chevrolet	200	0	Running	18
20	35	84	Patrick Staropoli (i)	Cook Racing Technologies	Toyota	200	0	Running	0
21	6	15	Tanner Gray	Tricon Garage	Toyota	200	0	Running	26
22	27	66	Luke Baldwin	ThorSport Racing	Ford	200	0	Running	15
23	18	44	Matt Gould	Niece Motorsports	Chevrolet	200	0	Running	14
24	25	5	Toni Breidinger (R)	Tricon Garage	Toyota	199	0	Running	13
25	11	81	Connor Mosack (R)	McAnally-Hilgemann Racing	Chevrolet	198	0	Running	26
26	3	45	Kaden Honeycutt	Niece Motorsports	Chevrolet	198	20	Running	29
27	14	88	Matt Crafton	ThorSport Racing	Ford	197	0	Running	10
28	30	02	Nathan Byrd	Young's Motorsports	Chevrolet	196	0	Running	9
29	19	9	Grant Enfinger	CR7 Motorsports	Chevrolet	195	0	DVP	8
30	32	2	Cody Dennison	Reaume Brothers Racing	Ford	195	0	Running	7
31	28	22	A. J. Waller (Note: Due to overheating and nauseousness, Josh Reaume relieved A. J. Waller in the No. 22 truck mid-race. Since Waller started the race, he is credited with the 31st place finish.)	Reaume Brothers Racing	Ford	174	0	Running	6
32	15	7	Corey Day (i)	Spire Motorsports	Chevrolet	158	0	Suspension	0
33	31	33	Frankie Muniz (R)	Reaume Brothers Racing	Ford	133	0	Rear End	4
34	33	6	Norm Benning	Norm Benning Racing	Chevrolet	89	0	Brakes	3
35	34	67	Ryan Roulette	Freedom Racing Enterprises	Chevrolet	73	0	Handling	2
Official race results

== Standings after the race ==
Drivers' Championship standings

	Pos	Driver	Points
	1	Corey Heim	229
	2	Ty Majeski	209 (-20)
	3	Chandler Smith	193 (–36)
3	4	Daniel Hemric	175 (–54)
	5	Stewart Friesen	167 (–62)
	6	Tyler Ankrum	164 (–65)
3	7	Grant Enfinger	157 (–72)
	8	Layne Riggs	148 (–81)
	9	Jake Garcia	137 (–92)
1	10	Ben Rhodes	131 (–98)
Official driver's standings

Manufacturers' Championship standings

	Pos	Manufacturer	Points
1	1	Chevrolet	188
1	2	Toyota	180 (-8)
	3	Ford	168 (–20)

- Note: Only the first 10 positions are included for the driver standings.

Previous race: 2025 Baptist Health 200	NASCAR Craftsman Truck Series; 2025 season	Next race: 2025 Weather Guard Truck Race
