= Luke Baldwin =

American racing driver (born 2006)

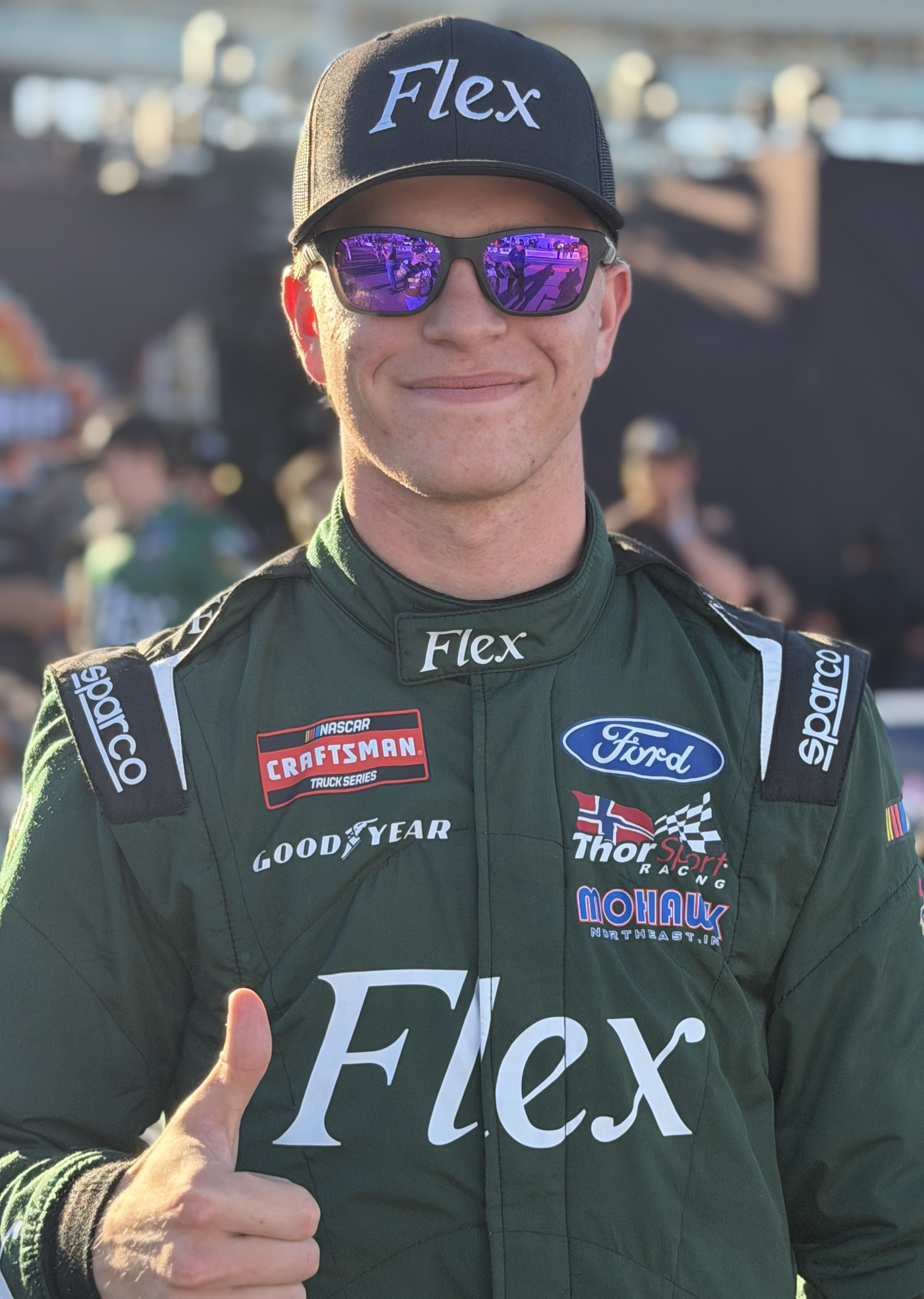
- Baldwin at Phoenix Raceway in 2025
- Born: Lucas Graham Baldwin; June 23, 2006 (age 20) Mooresville, North Carolina, U.S.

NASCAR Whelen Modified Tour career
- Debut season: 2024
- Current team: Tommy Baldwin Racing
- Years active: 2024–present
- Car number: 7
- Crew chief: Tommy Baldwin Jr.
- Starts: 18
- Championships: 0
- Wins: 0
- Poles: 2
- Best finish: 13th in 2025
- Finished last season: 39th (2026)

NASCAR O'Reilly Auto Parts Series career
- 2 races run over 1 year
- 2026 position: 95th
- Best finish: 95th (2026)
- First race: 2026 NFPA 250 (Martinsville)
- Last race: 2026 Kansas Lottery 300 (Kansas)
Wins	Top tens	Poles
0	0	0

NASCAR FedEx Freight Truck Series career
- 13 races run over 2 years
- 2026 position: 39th
- Best finish: 33rd (2025)
- First race: 2025 Boys & Girls Club of the Blue Ridge 200 (Martinsville)
- Last race: 2026 Ecosave 200 (Charlotte)
Wins	Top tens	Poles
0	0	0
- Statistics up to date as of November 7, 2026.

Lucas Graham Baldwin (born June 23, 2006) is an American professional stock car racing driver. He last competed part-time in the NASCAR Craftsman Truck Series, driving the No. 2/33 Ford F-150 for Team Reaume, part-time in the NASCAR O'Reilly Auto Parts Series, driving the No. 5 Ford Mustang Dark Horse for Hettinger Racing, and part-time in the NASCAR Whelen Modified Tour, driving the No. 7 for Tommy Baldwin Racing.

== Racing career ==
Baldwin has previously competed in series such as the SMART Modified Tour, where he won the championship in 2024 and 2025, the CARS Pro Late Model Tour, the Carolina Pro Late Model Tour, and the World Series of Asphalt Stock Car Racing.

=== NASCAR Whelen Modified Tour ===
In 2024, Baldwin made his debut in the NASCAR Whelen Modified Tour at New Hampshire Motor Speedway, driving the No. 38 for Sadler-Stanley Racing.

In 2025, Baldwin ran a partial schedule for Tommy Baldwin Racing, where he won two poles and earned seven top-ten finishes. He finished 13th in the final points standings.

=== NASCAR Craftsman Truck Series ===
On March 5, 2025, it was announced that Baldwin would drive a partial schedule in the NASCAR Craftsman Truck Series, driving the No. 66 Ford for ThorSport Racing in three races, which was expanded to five races later in the year.

On January 13, 2026, it was announced that Baldwin will drive the No. 2 Ford for Team Reaume for select races for the 2026 season. After failing to qualify for the race at New Hampshire, teammate Frankie Muniz would drop out, letting Baldwin into his seat in the No. 33.

=== NASCAR O'Reilly Auto Parts Series ===
On March 23, 2026, it was announced that Baldwin will attempt to make his debut in the NASCAR O'Reilly Auto Parts Series at Martinsville, driving the No. 5 Ford for Hettinger Racing.

== Personal life ==
Baldwin is the son of former NASCAR Cup Series crew chief and owner of TBR, Tommy Baldwin Jr., and the grandson of the late Tom Baldwin, who also competed in the Modified Tour. His older brother, Jack, also competes in modified racing.

== Motorsports career results ==
=== Stock car career summary ===
Season	Series	Team	Races	Wins	Top 5	Top 10	Points	Position
2023	CARS Pro Late Model Tour	Walker Motorsports	4	0	0	2	71	26th
2024	SMART Modified Tour	Sadler-Stanley Racing	14	2	10	13	540	**1st**
2024	CARS Pro Late Model Tour	Walker Motorsports	3	0	1	1	69	25th
2024	CARS Pro Late Model Tour	Tommy Baldwin Racing	1	0	0	0	69	25th
2024	NASCAR Whelen Modified Tour	SS Racing	1	0	0	0	98	37th
2024	NASCAR Whelen Modified Tour	Tommy Baldwin Racing	2	0	0	2	98	37th
2025	SMART Modified Tour	Sadler-Stanley Racing	14	4	10	12	541	**1st**
2025	CARS Pro Late Model Tour	Rick Ware Racing	5	2	5	4	243	10th
2025	CARS Pro Late Model Tour	Tommy Baldwin Racing	1	0	0	0	243	10th
2025	NASCAR Whelen Modified Tour	Tommy Baldwin Racing	12	0	2	7	402	13th
2025	NASCAR Craftsman Truck Series	ThorSport Racing	5	0	0	0	92	33rd
2026	SMART Modified Tour	Sadler-Stanley Racing	13	0	4	8	422	6th
2026	CARS Pro Late Model Tour	Bryson Lopez Racing	3	0	2	3	107	21st
2026	NASCAR Whelen Modified Tour	Tommy Baldwin Racing	3	0	0	0	58	39th
2026	NASCAR Craftsman Truck Series	Team Reaume	8	0	0	0	70	39th
2026	NASCAR O'Reilly Auto Parts Series	Hettinger Racing	2	0	0	0	0	NC†

^{†} As Baldwin was a guest driver, he was ineligible for championship points.

=== NASCAR ===
(key) (Bold – Pole position awarded by qualifying time. Italics – Pole position earned by points standings or practice time. * – Most laps led.)

==== O'Reilly Auto Parts Series ====
NASCAR O'Reilly Auto Parts Series results
Year	Team	No.	Make	1	2	3	4	5	6	7	8	9	10	11	12	13	14	15	16	17	18	19	20	21	22	23	24	25	26	27	28	29	30	31	32	33	NOAPSC	Pts	Ref
2026	Hettinger Racing	5	Ford	DAY	ATL	COA	PHO	LVS	DAR	MAR; 38	ROC	BRI	KAN; 35	TAL	TEX	GLN	DOV	CLT	NSH	POC	COR	SON	CHI	ATL	IND	IOW	DAY	DAR	GTW	BRI	LVS	CLT	PHO	TAL	MAR	HOM	95th	0^{1}	

==== Craftsman Truck Series ====
NASCAR Craftsman Truck Series results
Year	Team	No.	Make	1	2	3	4	5	6	7	8	9	10	11	12	13	14	15	16	17	18	19	20	21	22	23	24	25	NCTC	Pts	Ref
2025	ThorSport Racing	66	Ford	DAY	ATL	LVS	HOM	MAR; 22	BRI	CAR	TEX	KAN; 30	NWS; 13	CLT	NSH	MCH	POC; 12	LRP	IRP	GLN	RCH	DAR	BRI	NHA	ROV	TAL	MAR	PHO; 16	33rd	92	
2026	Team Reaume	2	Ford	DAY	ATL	STP	DAR	CAR; 21	BRI; 32	TEX	GLN	DOV; 32	CLT; 36	NSH	MCH	COR	LRP	NWS; 33	IRP	RCH	NHA; DNQ	BRI; 19	KAN	CLT; 22	PHO	TAL	MAR	HOM	39th	70	
2026	Team Reaume	33	Ford																		NHA; 31								39th	70	

^{*} Season still in progress
^{1} Ineligible for series points

==== Whelen Modified Tour ====
NASCAR Whelen Modified Tour results
Year	Team	No.	Make	1	2	3	4	5	6	7	8	9	10	11	12	13	14	15	16	NWMTC	Pts	Ref
2024	SS Racing	38	Chevy	NSM	RCH	THO	MON	RIV	SEE	NHA; 20	MON	LMP	THO	OSW	RIV	MON	THO			37th	98	
2024	Tommy Baldwin Racing	7	Chevy															NWS; 7	MAR; 7	37th	98	
2025	Tommy Baldwin Racing	7	Chevy	**NSM**; 4*	THO; 14	**NWS**; 2	SEE; 12	RIV; 10	WMM; 7	LMP; 7	MON; 7	MON; 7	THO; 25	RCH; 17	OSW	NHA	RIV	THO	MAR; 21	13th	402	
2026	Tommy Baldwin Racing	7	Chevy	NSM; 23	MAR; 23	THO	SEE	RIV	OXF	SEE	CLM	WMM	MON	THO	NHA; 28	STA	OSW	RIV	THO	39th	58	

=== CARS Pro Late Model Tour ===
(key)

CARS Pro Late Model Tour results
Year	Team	No.	Make	1	2	3	4	5	6	7	8	9	10	11	12	13	CPLMTC	Pts	Ref
2023	Walker Motorsports	15B	Toyota	SNM	HCY; 7		NWS; 24	TCM	DIL	CRW	WKS	HCY; 8	TCM	SBO	TCM	CRW	26th	71	
2023	Walker Motorsports	15B	Chevy			ACE; 22											26th	71	
2024	Walker Motorsports	15	Toyota	SNM	HCY	**OCS**; 5	ACE; 18	TCM	CRW	HCY		ACE; 14	FLC	SBO	TCM	NWS	25th	69	
2024	Tommy Baldwin Racing	7NY	N/A								NWS; 26						25th	69	
2025	Rick Ware Racing	51	Ford	AAS	CDL	**OCS**; 1	ACE	NWS; 7	CRW	HCY	HCY; 2	AND; 1*	FLC	SBO		**NWS**; 2*	10th	243	
2025	Tommy Baldwin Racing	7NY	N/A												TCM; 13		10th	243	
2026	Bryson Lopez Racing	47	Ford	SNM	NSV	CRW	ACE; 9	**NWS**; 4*	HCY; 10	AND	FLC	TCM	NPS	SBO			21st	107	

=== SMART Modified Tour ===
SMART Modified Tour results
Year	Car owner	No.	Make	1	2	3	4	5	6	7	8	9	10	11	12	13	14	SMTC	Pts	Ref
2024	Sadler-Stanley Racing	7VA	N/A	FLO; 5		**SBO**; 1	TRI; 5	ROU; 5	HCY; 6	**FCS**; 2	CRW; 21	JAC; 3	CAR; 4		DOM; 1*	SBO; 4	NWS; 3	1st	540	
2024	Sadler-Stanley Racing	7	N/A		CRW; 7									**CRW**; 6				1st	540	
2025	Sadler-Stanley Racing	7VA	N/A	FLO; 9	**AND**; 1*	SBO; 3	ROU; 5	HCY; 2*	**FCS**; 2	CRW; 5	CPS; 15	CAR; 1	CRW; 1	**DOM**; 6	FCS; 2	TRI; 23	NWS; 1	1st	541	
2026	Sadler-Stanley Racing	7VA	N/A	FLO; 24	**AND**; 2	SBO; 21	DOM; 13	HCY; 9	WKS; 7	FCR; 6	CRW; 12	PUL; 4	CAR; 2	ROU; 6	TRI; 3	NWS; 12*		6th	422	
