= Blake Barney =

American racing driver

- Born: December 12, 1999 (age 26) Jackson, New Jersey, U.S.

NASCAR Whelen Modified Tour career
- Debut season: 2018
- Years active: 2018–2019, 2022–2023
- Starts: 33
- Championships: 0
- Wins: 0
- Poles: 0
- Best finish: 10th in 2019
- Finished last season: 67th (2023)
- Statistics up to date as of August 10, 2024.

Blake Barney (born December 12, 1999) is an American professional stock car racing driver who last competed part-time in the NASCAR Whelen Modified Tour, driving the No. 14 for Richard Barney. He is the grandson of Dick Barney, a legendary car owner who is well known for his red No. 14, piloted by drivers such as Tony Siscone, John Blewett III, Reggie Ruggiero, and Jimmy Blewett.

Barney has also competed in series such as the SMART Modified Tour, the Tri-Track Open Modified Series, the Modified Racing Series, the Valenti Modified Racing Series, and the World Series of Asphalt Stock Car Racing.

== Motorsports results ==
=== NASCAR ===
(key) (Bold – Pole position awarded by qualifying time. Italics – Pole position earned by points standings or practice time. * – Most laps led.)

==== Whelen Modified Tour ====
NASCAR Whelen Modified Tour results
Year	Car owner	No.	Make	1	2	3	4	5	6	7	8	9	10	11	12	13	14	15	16	17	18	NWMTC	Pts	Ref
2018	Richard Barney	14	Chevy	MYR; 11	TMP; 31	STA; 27	SEE; 14	TMP; 17	LGY; 10	RIV; 16	NHA; 31	STA; 14	TMP; 13	BRI	OSW; 9	RIV; 15	NHA; 21	STA; 17	TMP; 16			12th	398	
2019	Richard Barney	14	Chevy	MYR; 13	SBO; 13	TMP; 16	STA; 10	WAL; 2	SEE; 15	TMP; 19	RIV; 20	NHA; 14	STA; 18	TMP; 14	OSW; 19	RIV; 20	NHA; 17	STA; 14	TMP; 17			10th	463	
2022	Richard Barney	14	Chevy	NSM	RCH	RIV	LEE	JEN	MND	RIV	WAL; 9	NHA	CLM	TMP	LGY	OSW	RIV	TMP	MAR			57th	35	
2023	Richard Barney	14	Chevy	NSM	RCH	MON	RIV	LEE	SEE	RIV	WAL; 8	NHA	LMP	THO	LGY	OSW	MON	RIV	NWS	THO	MAR	67th	36	

=== SMART Modified Tour ===
SMART Modified Tour results
Year	Car owner	No.	Make	1	2	3	4	5	6	7	8	9	10	11	12	13	14	SMTC	Pts	Ref
2024	Justin Gumley	27	N/A	FLO; 15	CRW; 8	SBO; 22	TRI; 16	ROU; DSQ*	HCY	FCS	CRW	JAC; 12	CAR; 19	CRW	DOM	SBO	NWS	22nd	175	
2025	Justin Gumley	27	N/A	FLO; 1	AND	SBO	ROU	HCY	FCS; 3	CRW	CPS	CAR	CRW	DOM; 3	FCS	TRI	NWS	21st	122	
2026	Justin Gumley	27	N/A	FLO	AND	SBO; 11	DOM	HCY	WKS	FCR	CRW	PUL	CAR	ROU	TRI	NWS		50th	30	
