= 2023 NASCAR Whelen Modified Tour =

39th season of the NASCAR Whelen Modified Tour

The 2023 NASCAR Whelen Modified Tour was the thirty-ninth season of the NASCAR Whelen Modified Tour, a stock car racing tour sanctioned by NASCAR. It began with the New Smyrna Beach Visitors Bureau 200 at New Smyrna Speedway on February 11 and ended with the Virginia is for Racing Lovers 200 at Martinsville Speedway on October 26.

Jon McKennedy entered the season as the defending series champion. McKennedy did not defend his title as the result of his race team folding partway through the season, which caused him to only run a part-time schedule. Ron Silk won his second series championship in 2023, previously winning the 2011 championship. Silk became the seventh driver to win multiple championships in the series.

On July 12, 2023, driver J. B. Fortin was suspended by NASCAR after he physically fought a NASCAR official after the race at Wall Stadium. He was reinstated by NASCAR on September 15.

== Schedule ==
No.	Race title	Track	Date
1	New Smyrna Beach Visitors Bureau 200	New Smyrna Speedway, New Smyrna Beach, Florida	February 11
2	Virginia is for Racing Lovers 150	Richmond Raceway, Richmond, Virginia	April 1
3	Duel at the Dog 200	Monadnock Speedway, Winchester, New Hampshire	May 6
4	Buzz Chew Chevrolet Cadillac 200	Riverhead Raceway, Riverhead, New York	May 21
5	Granite State Derby	Lee USA Speedway, Lee, New Hampshire	May 27
6	Seekonk 150	Seekonk Speedway, Seekonk, Massachusetts	June 10
7	Miller Lite Salutes Mike Ewanitsko 200	Riverhead Raceway, Riverhead, New York	June 24
8	Jersey Shore 150	Wall Stadium, Wall Township, New Jersey	July 8
9	Mohegan Sun 100	New Hampshire Motor Speedway, Loudon, New Hampshire	July 15
10	Nu-Way Auto Parts 150	Lancaster Motorplex, Lancaster, New York	August 5
11	Thompson 150 presented by FloSports.com	Thompson Speedway, Thompson, Connecticut	August 16
12	CheckeredFlag.com 150	Langley Speedway, Hampton, Virginia	August 26
13	Toyota Mod Classic 150	Oswego Speedway, Oswego, New York	September 2
14	Winchester Fair	Monadnock Speedway, Winchester, New Hampshire	September 9
15	Eddie Partridge 256	Riverhead Raceway, Riverhead, New York	September 16
16	Brushy Mountain Powersports 150	North Wilkesboro Speedway, North Wilkesboro, North Carolina	September 30
17	World Series 150 presented by FloSports.com	Thompson Speedway, Thompson, Connecticut	October 8
18	Virginia is for Racing Lovers 200	Martinsville Speedway, Martinsville, Virginia	October 26

=== Schedule changes ===
- The Duel at the Dog 200 at Monadnock Speedway was moved from June to May.
- The May races at Lee USA Speedway and Riverhead Raceway both moved back a week from where they were on the schedule in 2022.
- Seekonk Speedway in Massachusetts returned to the schedule for the first time since 2019. It replaced the race at Jennerstown Speedway in Pennsylvania.
- Lancaster Motorplex in New York returned to the schedule for the first time since 2021.
- A race at Claremont Speedway in New Hampshire was originally scheduled for July 29. It was canceled due to rain, and not rescheduled.
- A second race at Monadnock Speedway in New Hampshire was added in September.
- A race at the reopened North Wilkesboro Speedway in North Carolina was added in September.

== Results and standings ==
=== Race results ===
No.	Race	Pole position	Most laps led	Winning driver
1	New Smyrna Beach Visitors Bureau 200	Doug Coby	Doug Coby	Ron Silk
2	Virginia is for Racing Lovers 150	Austin Beers	Austin Beers	Austin Beers
3	Duel at the Dog 200	Justin Bonsignore	Doug Coby	Doug Coby
4	Buzz Chew Chevrolet Cadillac 200	Justin Bonsignore	Ron Silk	Justin Bonsignore
5	Granite State Derby	Doug Coby	Matt Hirschman	Matt Hirschman
6	Seekonk 150	Matt Hirschman	Matt Hirschman	Matt Hirschman
7	Miller Lite Salutes Mike Ewanitsko 200	Austin Beers	Ron Silk	Ron Silk
8	Jersey Shore 150	Austin Beers	Austin Beers	Ron Silk
9	Mohegan Sun 100	Justin Bonsignore	Justin Bonsignore	Justin Bonsignore
10	Nu-Way Auto Parts 150	Justin Bonsignore	Austin Beers	Austin Beers
11	Thompson 150 presented by FloSports.com	Austin Beers	Justin Bonsignore	Justin Bonsignore
12	CheckeredFlag.com 150	Austin Beers	Austin Beers	Kyle Bonsignore
13	Toyota Mod Classic 150	Justin Bonsignore	Justin Bonsignore	Ron Silk
14	Winchester Fair	Justin Bonsignore	Justin Bonsignore	Justin Bonsignore
15	Eddie Partridge 256	Justin Bonsignore	Ron Silk	Justin Bonsignore
16	Brushy Mountain Powersports 150	Austin Beers	Austin Beers	Matt Hirschman
17	World Series 150 presented by FloSports.com	Justin Bonsignore	Austin Beers	Ron Silk
18	Virginia is for Racing Lovers 200	Tyler Rypkema	Ryan Preece	Ryan Preece

=== Drivers' championship ===
(key) Bold – Pole position awarded by time. Italics – Pole position set by final practice results or rainout. * – Most laps led. ** – All laps led.

Pos	Driver	NSM	RCH	MON	RIV	LEE	SEE	RIV	WAL	NHA	LMP	THO	LGY	OSW	MON	RIV	NWS	THO	MAR	Points
1	Ron Silk	1	7	3	2*	5	3	1*	1	3	3	2	4	1	12	3*	2	1	6	759
2	Justin Bonsignore	2	4	**5**	**1**	9	4	2	2	**1***	**4**	1*	3	**15***	**1****	**1**	3	13	2	750
3	Austin Beers	8	**1***	4	17	3	8	**10**	**9***	4	1*	**4**	**2***	2	2	4	**14**	10*	31	677
4	Tyler Rypkema	11	19	11	4	15	13	7	14	15	12	10	6	8	11	9	12	16	**5**	595
5	Kyle Bonsignore	19	11	8	10	8	9	4	11	18	9	19	1	5	4	11	21	4	30	594
6	Doug Coby	5*	13	1*	19	**6**	2	3	6	2	7	8			5		10			496
7	Craig Lutz	18	28	17	9	12	11	14	23	30		5	9	16	9	8	34	8	26	471
8	Ken Heagy	21	17	20	25	18	16	21	13	25	19	14	13	11	17	10	32	19	20	461
9	Jake Johnson	6		14	8	7	19		18	10		12	7		7	14	16	2		433
10	Matt Hirschman	3	18	9		1*	**1****	15	7		2	20					1*		4	420
11	Melissa Fifield	33	20	26	21	20	17	22	16	28	16	15	15	18	18	12	28	22	35	410
12	Anthony Nocella	9		27	16	21	10		12	16	13	17	10		6		19	6		391
13	Anthony Sesely	4	26	25			5		4	6	17	9		4			11	15	14	389
14	Eric Goodale	27	10	7	5			11	21	13		3				16	4	3	23	387
15	J. B. Fortin	16	2	12	6	14	6	12	19							17	13	20	7	384
16	Dave Sapienza	7	14	30	27		12	19	10	14		16					15	14	25	325
17	Patrick Emerling	34	5	10	7					5		7					5		3	277
18	Tommy Catalano	10	23	18		10				21	6			9			20		12	270
19	Jon McKennedy	24	9	2	3	2	7							7						254
20	Andrew Krause	25	16	22					5			18					7	7	9	243
21	Gary McDonald	22	22	23	20						15		14	12		13	29			226
22	Kyle Ebersole	12	12	21							10		5				8		36	204
23	Woody Pitkat			16		17	20			19		11			14			9		202
24	Max Zachem					19	18	16	20	29		13						18		199
25	Justin Brown	15	15	19	18	13	14	18												196
26	Bobby Santos III									27		6		3			9	5	28	186
27	Tim Connolly		25	24						22	18		11	14			36		22	180
28	Max McLaughlin		3							17	11		8						8	174
29	Sam Rameau			6		4									3		17	21		169
30	Bryan Narducci		8					20			8			17					19	148
31	Brian Robie	26		13		11	15								8					147
32	Eddie McCarthy	29	27						3	20							38		17	130
33	Matt Kimball	32		15		16				23					10					124
34	Anthony Bello	31								24		22						12	21	110
35	J. R. Bertuccio	30						23								5		25		108
36	Timmy Solomito				11			9								6				106
37	Roger Turbush				24			6								7				95
38	John Beatty Jr.				15			8								15				94
39	Matt Swanson									8		23						11		90
40	Ryan Newman		29														6		11	87
41	Bobby Labonte		6														33		10	83
42	Ronnie Williams	23								12								17		80
43	Andy Seuss									9							22		27	74
44	Mark Stewart							13								2				73
45	Jack Handley Jr.				14			5												69
46	Brett Meservey														15		26	24		68
47	Jacob Perry			28											13		27			64
48	Joey Coulter	14																	13	61
49	Chris Young Jr.				12			17												59
50	Tommy Wanick								15		14									59
51	Eric Berndt											21						23	32	57
52	John-Michael Shenette												12				37		34	49
53	Brandon Ward																24		15	49
54	Ryan Preece																		1*	48
55	Matt Brode				22											18				48
56	Carson Loftin																25		16	47
57	Dylan Slepian				23														18	47
58	Chris Hatton Jr.	35															30		24	43
59	Chase Dowling									11							35			42
60	Andy Jankowiak													13					33	42
61	Burt Myers																18		29	41
62	Cory Plummer			29											19					40
63	Chuck Hossfeld										5									39
64	Jimmy Zacharias													6						38
65	Jimmy Blewett	28							22											38
66	Corey LaJoie									7										37
67	Blake Barney								8											36
68	Tyler Catalano													10						34
69	Bryan Dauzat									26										32
70	Spencer Davis	13																		31
71	Kyle Soper				13															31
72	Nathan Wenzel														16					28
73	Jeremy Gerstner	17																		27
74	Tom Martino Jr.								17											27
75	James Pritchard Jr.	20																		24
76	Mike Leaty										20									24
77	Cory DiMatteo		21																	23
78	Jamie Tomaino																23			21
79	Walter Sutcliffe Jr.		24																	20
80	Eddie Brunnhoelzl III				26															18
81	Chris Turbush				28															16
82	Gary Putnam																31			13

== See also ==
- 2023 NASCAR Cup Series
- 2023 NASCAR Xfinity Series
- 2023 NASCAR Craftsman Truck Series
- 2023 ARCA Menards Series
- 2023 ARCA Menards Series East
- 2023 ARCA Menards Series West
- 2023 NASCAR Pinty's Series
- 2023 NASCAR Mexico Series
- 2023 NASCAR Whelen Euro Series
- 2023 SRX Series
- 2023 CARS Tour
- 2023 SMART Modified Tour
