= Nathan Wenzel =

American racing driver (born 2003)

- Born: June 24, 2003 (age 23) Granby, Massachusetts, U.S.

NASCAR Whelen Modified Tour career
- Debut season: 2023
- Years active: 2023–2025
- Starts: 5
- Championships: 0
- Wins: 0
- Poles: 0
- Best finish: 45th in 2024
- Finished last season: 61st (2025)
- Statistics up to date as of October 24, 2025.

Nathan Wenzel (born June 24, 2003) is an American professional stock car racing driver who last competed part-time in the NASCAR Whelen Modified Tour, driving the No. 81 for Keri-Ann Wenzel.

Wenzel is a champion in the Sportsman Modified division at Claremont Motorsports Park, and has previously competed in series such as the Modified Racing Series, the Tri-Track Open Modified Series, the NHSTRA Modified Battle for the Cup, and the Whitcomb 5 Series.

== Motorsports results ==
=== NASCAR ===
(key) (Bold – Pole position awarded by qualifying time. Italics – Pole position earned by points standings or practice time. * – Most laps led.)

==== Whelen Modified Tour ====
NASCAR Whelen Modified Tour results
Year	Team	No.	Make	1	2	3	4	5	6	7	8	9	10	11	12	13	14	15	16	17	18	NWMTC	Pts	Ref
2023	Keri-Ann Wenzel	81	Chevy	NSM	RCH	MON	RIV	LEE	SEE	RIV	WAL	NHA	LMP	THO	LGY	OSW	MON; 16	RIV	NWS	THO	MAR	72nd	28	
2024	Keri-Ann Wenzel	81	Chevy	NSM	RCH	THO	MON; 24	RIV	SEE	NHA	MON; 17	LMP	THO	OSW	RIV	MON; 16	THO	NWS	MAR			45th	75	
2025	Keri-Ann Wenzel	81	Chevy	NSM	THO	NWS	SEE	RIV	WMM	LMP	MON; 21	MON; Wth	THO	RCH	OSW	NHA	RIV	THO	MAR			61st	23	
