= 2025 SMART Modified Tour =

American motorsport season

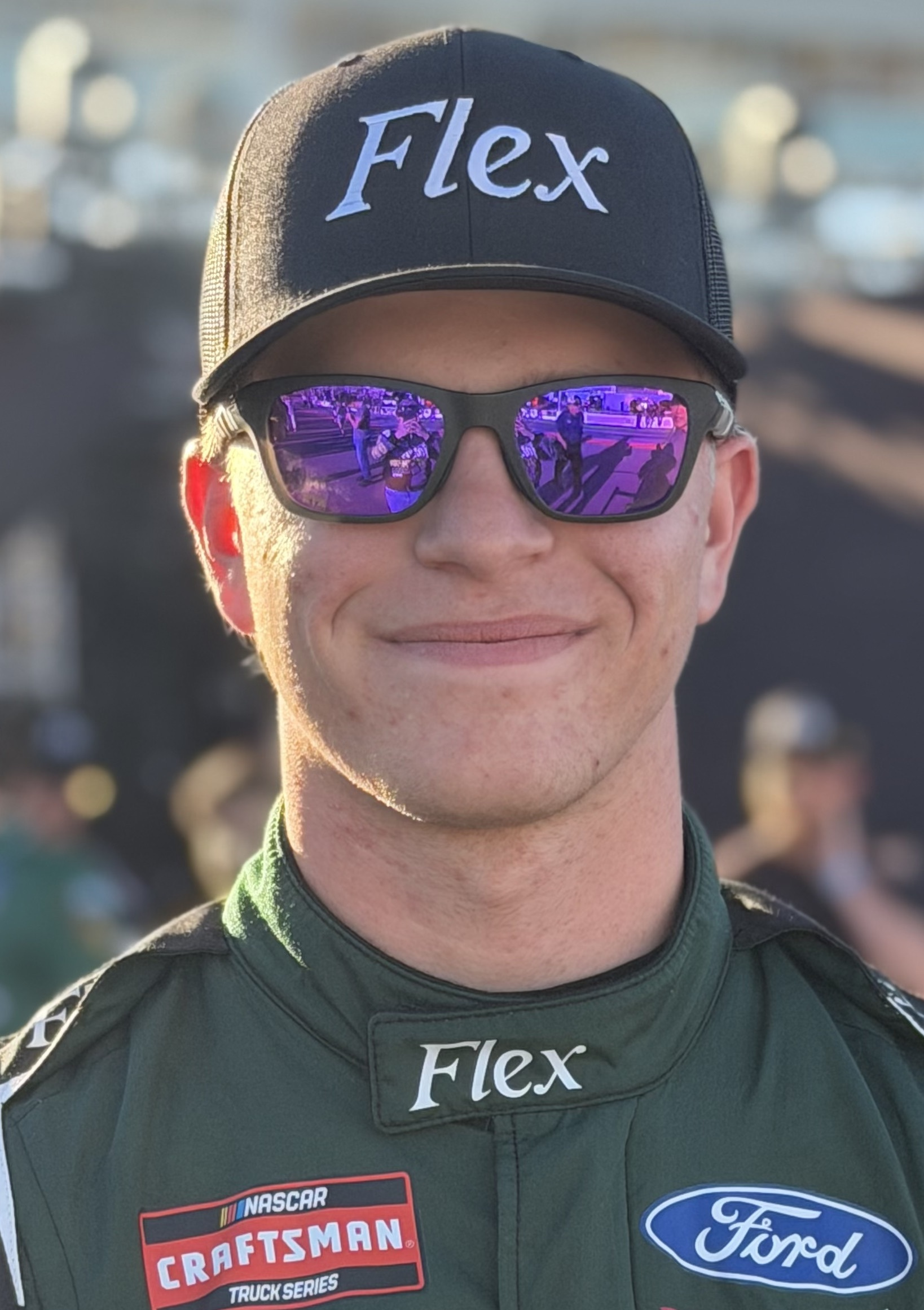
Luke Baldwin, the 2025 SMART Modified Tour champion.

The 2025 SMART Modified Tour was the 21st season of the SMART Modified Tour. It began with the Zach Brewer Memorial at Florence Motor Speedway on March 1 and ended with the Frontier Natural Gas 99 at North Wilkesboro Speedway on October 18.

Luke Baldwin, who entered the season as the defending champion, won his second straight championship after winning the season finale at North Wilkesboro.

== Schedule ==
No.	Race title	Track	Date
1	Zach Brewer Memorial	Florence Motor Speedway, Timmonsville, South Carolina	March 1
2	Pace-O-Matic 99 at Anderson	Anderson Motor Speedway, Anderson, South Carolina	March 8
3	King of the Modifieds	South Boston Speedway, South Boston, Virginia	March 22
4	Rumble In Rougemont	Orange County Speedway, Rougemont, North Carolina	April 5
5	Hickory Hundred	Hickory Motor Speedway, Hickory, North Carolina	April 12
6	Kenny Minter Classic at Franklin County	Franklin County Raceway, Callaway, Virginia	May 23
7	Revolutionary 99	Caraway Speedway, Asheboro, North Carolina	July 5
8	Cardinal 99	Coastal Plains Speedway, Jacksonville, North Carolina	August 29
9	Islander Carteret Clash	Carteret County Speedway, Swansboro, North Carolina	August 30
10	Robert Jeffreys Memorial	Caraway Speedway, Asheboro, North Carolina	September 7
11	The Flying VA Classic	Dominion Raceway, Thornburg, Virginia	September 13
12	Mod Squad Nationals	Franklin County Raceway, Callaway, Virginia	September 20
13	Freeman Hoosier 99	Tri-County Motor Speedway, Hudson, North Carolina	October 11
14	Frontier Natural Gas 99	North Wilkesboro Speedway, North Wilkesboro, North Carolina	October 18

- The race at the New River All American Speedway on August 29 was temporarily removed from the schedule after the track announced that it would shut down on May 28. Florence Motor Speedway acquired promotional rights for the track, now renamed Coastal Plains Raceway, and the event was held as scheduled.
- The Mod Squad Nationals was originally scheduled to be held at Lonesome Pine Motorsports Park, but due to an impending sale of the track set to be completed in September, the race was instead moved to Franklin County Raceway. This gave Franklin County a second date in 2025.

== Results and standings ==
=== Races ===
No.	Race	Fastest qualifier	Most laps led	Winning driver
1	Zach Brewer Memorial	Bryce Bailey	Jake Crum	Blake Barney
2	Pace-O-Matic 99	Luke Baldwin	Luke Baldwin	Luke Baldwin
3	King of the Modifieds	Matt Hirschman	Matt Hirschman	Matt Hirschman
4	Rumble in Rougemont	Bryce Bailey	Ryan Newman	Ryan Newman
5	Hickory Hundred	Bryce Bailey	Luke Baldwin	Paulie Hartwig III
6	Kenny Minter Classic at Franklin County	Luke Baldwin	Joey Braun	Ryan Newman
7	Revolutionary 99	Kyle Scisco	Danny Bohn	Danny Bohn
8	Cardinal 99	Ryan Newman	Ryan Newman	Jonathan Cash
9	Islander Carteret Clash	Paulie Hartwig III	Danny Bohn	Luke Baldwin
10	Robert Jeffreys Memorial	Carson Loftin	Carson Loftin	Luke Baldwin (Note: Carson Loftin originally won the race, but was disqualified due a post race engine violation. Luke Baldwin, who originally finished second, was inherited the win.)
11	The Flying VA Classic	Luke Baldwin	Ryan Newman	Ryan Newman
12	Mod Squad Nationals	Joey Braun	Danny Bohn	Danny Bohn
13	Freeman Hoosier 99	Burt Myers	Carson Loftin	Carson Loftin
14	Frontier Natural Gas 99	Joey Coulter	Brandon Ward	Luke Baldwin

=== Drivers' championship ===
(key) Bold - Pole position awarded by time. Italics - Pole position set by final practice results or rainout. * – Most laps led.

Pos	Driver	FLO	AND	SBO	ROU	HCY	FCR	CRW	CPS	CAR	CRW	DOM	FCR	TRI	NWS	Points
1	Luke Baldwin	9	**1***	3	5	2*	**2**	5	15	1	1	**6**	2	23	1	541
2	Ryan Newman	15	7	8	1*	14	1	4	**3***	10	9	1*	5	18	3	505
3	Paulie Hartwig III	16	2	6	2	1	6	22	6	**3**	3	9	9	3	8	491
SMART Modified Tour playoff cutoff
4	Jake Crum	2*	5	15	7	6	9	13	10	7	11	7	3	26	21	443
5	Joey Coulter	6	14	19	4	7	12	2	2	4	7	8	8	5	**4**	480
6	Jack Baldwin	7	16	16	13	15	8	9	5	2	6	4	11	10	9	444
7	Burt Myers	13	4	13	21	19	7	10	9	9	4	11	6	**2**	18	429
8	Joey Braun	3	15	7	9	5	5*	21	18	8	17	16	**4**	8	26	425
9	Jonathan Cash	10	10	29	6	10	10	25	1	11	2	13	10	20	25	399
10	Slate Myers	4	8	26	17	20	15	23	12	12	12	5	14	13	23	370
11	Daniel Yates	8	11	14	15	17	14	16	16	13	10	12		12	10	365
12	Jimmy Wallace	20	13	20	12	13	16	15	14	15	15	14	13	15	15	364
13	Danny Bohn						4	1**	4	5*	5	15	1*	4	28	328
14	Carter McMurray	5	9	25	19	12	13	8			8		7	11	27	307
15	Bryce Bailey	**14**	17	24	**8**	**3**	18	14	8	14				24	24	287
16	Carson Loftin		3	5	11			3			**DSQ***		15	1*	16	268
17	Jonathan Kievman	17	12	27	16	18	11		17	18						196
18	Jeremy Gerstner			21				12	13	16	20	17			12	176
19	Carsten DiGiantomasso			18				17	7	6					11	150
20	Brandon Ward	19		4	18			26							2*	138
21	Blake Barney	1					3					3				122
22	Landon Huffman		6	11			17							14	Wth	116
23	Tom Buzze			28		9		24				Wth		16	19	109
24	Anthony Bello			30				7				2			20	105
25	Cayden Lapcevich										14			6	14	93
26	Sam Rameau			17	10							10				89
27	Matt Hirschman			**1***		4										86
28	Melissa Fifield							19			16			27	17	85
29	William Lambros													7	5	70
30	Gary Putnam					16		20						17		70
31	Max Handley								11	17				25		70
32	Kyle Scisco							**6**			13					67
33	Eddie McCarthy			9											7	66
34	Cody Norman							27					12	21		63
35	Chris Pasteryak	12		12												58
36	Jason Tutterow	Wth		31				18	Wth	Wth	19				DNS	55
37	John-Michael Shenette	11			20											51
38	Brody Jones													28	13	41
39	Mike Christopher Jr.				3											39
40	Stephen Kopcik			2												39
41	Bobby Labonte														6	36
42	Jacob Perry					8										33
43	Austin McDaniel													9		32
44	Jayden Harman			10												31
45	Jack Handley Jr.							11								30
46	Jacob Lutz					11										30
47	Frank Fleming				14											27
48	Joel Belanger										18					23
49	Josh Lowder	18														23
50	Luke Fleming													19		22
51	Mike Speeney									DNS						22
52	Ron Silk			22												21
53	Norman Newman														22	19
54	Jordan Fleming													22		19
55	Gary Young Jr.			23												18
56	Tony Hanbury			32												9
57	Tom Martino Jr.			33												8
	Jarrett DiGiantomasso								Wth	Wth						
	Troy Young												Wth			
	Chris Hatton Jr.														Wth	
Pos	Driver	FLO	AND	SBO	ROU	HCY	FCS	CRW	CPS	CAR	CRW	DOM	FCR	TRI	NWS	Points

== See also ==
- 2025 NASCAR Cup Series
- 2025 NASCAR Xfinity Series
- 2025 NASCAR Craftsman Truck Series
- 2025 ARCA Menards Series
- 2025 ARCA Menards Series East
- 2025 ARCA Menards Series West
- 2025 NASCAR Whelen Modified Tour
- 2025 NASCAR Canada Series
- 2025 NASCAR Mexico Series
- 2025 NASCAR Euro Series
- 2025 NASCAR Brasil Series
- 2025 CARS Tour
- 2025 ASA STARS National Tour
