= Carsten DiGiantomasso =

American racing driver

- Nationality: American
- Born: 2002 or 2003 (age 23–24) Jackson Township, New Jersey, U.S.

SMART Modified Tour career
- Debut season: 2024
- Years active: 2024–present
- Starts: 10
- Championships: 0
- Wins: 0
- Poles: 0
- Best finish: 19th in 2025
- Statistics up to date as of August 8, 2026.

Carsten DiGiantomasso (born 2002 or 2003) is an American professional stock car racing driver who currently competes in the SMART Modified Tour, driving the No. 33 for Charlie DiGiantomasso. He is also a fabricator for JR Motorsports.

DiGiantomasso currently resides in Mooresville, North Carolina.

DiGiantomasso has also competed in the Carolina Crate Modified Series, the Aqua Duck 602 Speedweek Series, the World Series of Asphalt Stock Car Racing, and the NASCAR Weekly Series, and is a regular competitor at Wall Stadium.

== Motorsports results ==
=== SMART Modified Tour ===
SMART Modified Tour results
Year	Car owner	No.	Make	1	2	3	4	5	6	7	8	9	10	11	12	13	14	SMTC	Pts	Ref
2024	N/A	24X	N/A	FLO	CRW	SBO	TRI	ROU	HCY	FCS	CRW	JAC; 22	CAR; 22	CRW	DOM	SBO	NWS	43rd	38	
2025	Charlie DiGiantomasso	33	N/A	FLO	AND	SBO; 18	ROU	HCY	FCS	CRW; 17	CPS; 6	CAR; 6	CRW	DOM	FCS	TRI	NWS; 11	19th	150	
2026	Charlie DiGiantomasso	33	N/A	FLO	AND	SBO; 7	DOM; 4	HCY	WKS	FCR	CRW	PUL; 18	CAR	ROU	TRI	NWS		25th	94	
