= Michael Boehler =

American racing driver

- Nationality: American
- Born: 1972 (age 53–54) East Freetown, Massachusetts, U.S.

NASCAR Featherlite Modified Tour career
- Debut season: 1999
- Years active: 1999–2001
- Starts: 14
- Championships: 0
- Wins: 0
- Poles: 0
- Best finish: 21st in 2000
- Statistics up to date as of October 17, 2024.

Michael Boehler (born 1972) is an American former professional stock car racing driver and team owner who currently fields the No. 3 for Boehler Racing Enterprises in the NASCAR Whelen Modified Tour. He is the son of Len Boehler, who previously owned the team until his death in 2001.

Boehler has previously competed in the Modified Tour, having run from 1999 to 2001, where he won rookie of the year honors in 2000.

== Motorsports results ==
=== NASCAR ===
(key) (Bold – Pole position awarded by qualifying time. Italics – Pole position earned by points standings or practice time. * – Most laps led.)

==== Featherlite Modified Tour ====
NASCAR Featherlite Modified Tour results
Year	Team	No.	Make	1	2	3	4	5	6	7	8	9	10	11	12	13	14	15	16	17	18	19	20	21	NFMTC	Pts	Ref
1999	Boehler Racing Enterprises	34	Chevy	TMP; DNQ	RPS	STA; DNQ	RCH	STA; DNQ	RIV	JEN	NHA; DNQ	NZH	HOL; DNQ	TMP; DNQ	NHA; DNQ	RIV	GLN; DNQ	STA	RPS	TMP; DNQ	NHA; DNQ	STA; DNQ	MAR; DNQ	TMP; 34	N/A	0	
2000	Boehler Racing Enterprises	03	Chevy	STA; DNQ	RCH; 29	STA; 14	RIV; DNQ	SEE; DNQ	NHA; 27	NZH; 22	TMP; 21	RIV; DNQ	GLN; 20	TMP; 25		WFD; DNQ	NHA; 30	STA; 24	MAR; 15	TMP; DNQ					21st	1340	
2000	N/A	72	Chevy												STA; 22										21st	1340	
2001	Boehler Racing Enterprises	34	Chevy	SBO; 8	TMP	STA	WFD; DNQ	NZH	STA	RIV	SEE	RCH	NHA; 25	HOL	RIV	CHE	TMP	STA	WFD	TMP	STA	MAR	TMP		55th	276	
