= Chris Hatton Jr. =

American racing driver (born 1995)

- Nationality: American
- Born: October 24, 1995 (age 31) Ormond Beach, Florida, U.S.

NASCAR Whelen Modified Tour career
- Debut season: 2023
- Years active: 2023–2025
- Starts: 6
- Championships: 0
- Wins: 0
- Poles: 0
- Best finish: 54th in 2024
- Finished last season: 64th (2025)
- Statistics up to date as of October 24, 2025.

Christopher Hatton Jr. (born October 24, 1995) is an American professional stock car racing driver who last competed part-time in the NASCAR Whelen Modified Tour, driving the No. 09 for Chris Hatton.

Hatton has also previously competed in the SMART Modified Tour, the NASCAR Weekly Series, and the World Series of Asphalt Stock Car Racing.

== Motorsports results ==
=== NASCAR ===
(key) (Bold – Pole position awarded by qualifying time. Italics – Pole position earned by points standings or practice time. * – Most laps led.)

==== Whelen Modified Tour ====
NASCAR Whelen Modified Tour results
Year	Car owner	No.	Make	1	2	3	4	5	6	7	8	9	10	11	12	13	14	15	16	17	18	NWMTC	Pts	Ref
2023	Chris Hatton	09	Chevy	NSM; 35	RCH	MON	RIV	LEE	SEE	RIV	WAL	NHA	LMP	THO	LGY	OSW	MON	RIV	NWS; 30	THO	MAR; 24	58th	43	
2024	Chris Hatton	09	Chevy	NSM; 31	RCH	THO	MON	RIV	SEE	NHA	MON	LMP	THO	OSW	RIV	MON	THO	NWS; 19	MAR			54th	38	
2025	Chris Hatton	09	Chevy	NSM; 25	THO	NWS	SEE	RIV	WMM	LMP	MON	MON	THO	RCH	OSW	NHA	RIV	THO	MAR			64th	19	

=== SMART Modified Tour ===
SMART Modified Tour results
Year	Car owner	No.	Make	1	2	3	4	5	6	7	8	9	10	11	12	13	14	SMTC	Pts	Ref
2024	Chris Hatton	09	N/A	FLO	CRW	SBO	TRI	ROU	HCY	FCS	CRW	JAC	CAR	CRW	DOM	SBO	NWS; 21	57th	20	
2025	Chris Hatton	09	N/A	FLO	AND	SBO	ROU	HCY	FCS	CRW	CPS	CAR	CRW	DOM	FCS	TRI	NWS; Wth	N/A	0	
